= 1995 NBA expansion draft =

Player selection draft

General information
- Sport: Basketball
- Date: June 24, 1995

Overview
- League: NBA
- Expansion teams: Toronto Raptors; Vancouver Grizzlies
- Expansion season: 1995–96 NBA season
- First selection: B. J. Armstrong

The 1995 NBA expansion draft was the tenth expansion draft in the history of the National Basketball Association (NBA). The draft was held on June 24, 1995, so that the newly founded Toronto Raptors and Vancouver Grizzlies could acquire players for the upcoming 1995–96 season. Toronto was awarded an expansion team on September 30, 1993, while Vancouver was awarded the league's 29th franchise on April 27, 1994. They were the first NBA teams based in Canada since the 1946–47 season Toronto Huskies.

In an NBA expansion draft, new NBA teams are allowed to acquire players from the previously established teams in the league. Not all players on a given team are available during an expansion draft, since each team can protect a certain number of players from being selected. In this draft, each of the twenty-seven other NBA teams had protected eight players from their roster, and the Raptors and the Grizzlies selected fourteen and thirteen unprotected players respectively, one from each team.

Prior to the draft, the league conducted a coin flip between the Raptors and the Grizzlies to decide their draft order in this expansion draft and in the 1995 NBA draft. The Grizzlies won the coin flip and chose to have the higher pick in the 1995 Draft, allowing the Raptors to receive the first selection and the right to select fourteen players in the expansion draft.

The Raptors were formed and owned by a group headed by Toronto businessman John Bitove. Brendan Malone was hired as the franchise's first head coach. The Raptors used their first pick to select three-time NBA champion B. J. Armstrong from the Chicago Bulls. However, Armstrong refused to report for training and was traded to the Golden State Warriors for five other players. The Raptors' other selections included four-time NBA champion John Salley and six other former first-round picks, Doug Smith, Willie Anderson, Ed Pinckney, Acie Earl, B. J. Tyler and Oliver Miller. Seven players from the expansion draft joined the Raptors for their inaugural season, but only Miller, Earl and Žan Tabak played more than one season for the team. Tabak and Andrés Guibert were the only international players in the draft.

The Grizzlies were formed and owned by Vancouver sports magnate Arthur Griffiths. Former Atlanta Hawks assistant coach Brian Winters was hired as the franchise's first head coach. The Grizzlies used their first pick to select former first-round pick Greg Anthony from the New York Knicks. The Grizzlies' other selections included three-time NBA champion Byron Scott and three other former first-round picks, Benoit Benjamin, Doug Edwards and Blue Edwards. On draft day, the Grizzlies acquired a second-round draft pick from the Orlando Magic in exchange for selecting Rodney Dent, who had never played in the NBA. Eight players from the expansion draft joined the Grizzlies for their inaugural season, but only Anthony and Blue Edwards played more than one season for the team.

== Key ==
Pos.	G	F	C
Position	Guard	Forward	Center

^{+}	Denotes player who has been selected for at least one All-Star Game
^{#}	Denotes player who has never appeared in an NBA regular-season or playoff game

== Selections ==
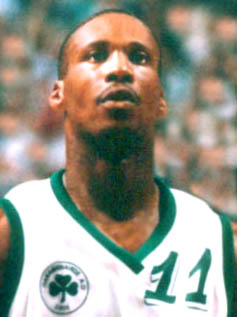
Byron Scott was selected by the Vancouver Grizzlies from the Indiana Pacers with the 18th pick.

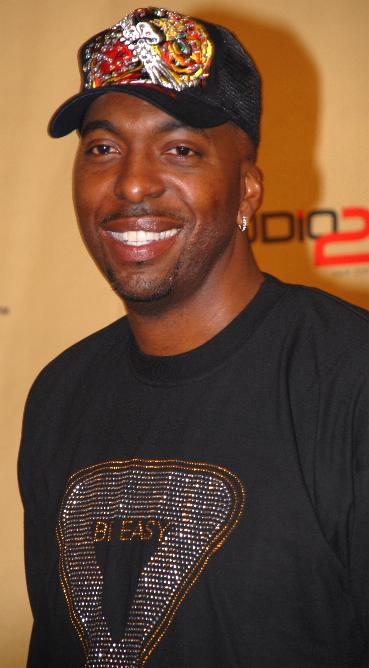
John Salley was selected by the Toronto Raptors from the Miami Heat with the 25th pick.

Pick	Player	Pos.	Nationality	Team	Previous team	NBA years^{[a]}	Career with the franchise^{[b]}	Ref.
1	B. J. Armstrong^{+}	G	United States	Toronto Raptors	Chicago Bulls	6	—^{[c]}	
2	Greg Anthony	G	United States	Vancouver Grizzlies	New York Knicks	4	1995–1997	
3	Tony Massenburg	F	United States	Toronto Raptors	Los Angeles Clippers	3	1995–1996	
4	Rodney Dent^{#}^{[A]}	F	United States	Vancouver Grizzlies	Orlando Magic	0^{[d]}	—^{[c]}	
5	Andrés Guibert	F/C	Cuba^{[e]}	Toronto Raptors	Minnesota Timberwolves	2	—^{[c]}	
6	Antonio Harvey	F/C	United States	Vancouver Grizzlies	Los Angeles Lakers	2	1995	
7	Keith Jennings	G	United States	Toronto Raptors	Golden State Warriors	3	—^{[c]}	
8	Reggie Slater	F	United States	Vancouver Grizzlies	Denver Nuggets	1	—^{[c]}	
9	Dontonio Wingfield	F	United States	Toronto Raptors	Seattle SuperSonics	1	—^{[c]}	
10	Trevor Ruffin	G	United States	Vancouver Grizzlies	Phoenix Suns	1	—^{[c]}	
11	Doug Smith	F	United States	Toronto Raptors	Dallas Mavericks	4	—^{[c]}	
12	Derrick Phelps	G	United States	Vancouver Grizzlies	Sacramento Kings	1	—^{[c]}	
13	Jerome Kersey	F	United States	Toronto Raptors	Portland Trail Blazers	11	—^{[c]}	
14	Larry Stewart	F	United States	Vancouver Grizzlies	Washington Bullets	4	—^{[c]}	
15	Žan Tabak	C	Croatia^{[f]}	Toronto Raptors	Houston Rockets	1	1995–1998	
16	Kenny Gattison	F/C	United States	Vancouver Grizzlies	Charlotte Hornets	8	1995–1996	
17	Willie Anderson	G/F	United States	Toronto Raptors	San Antonio Spurs	7	1995–1996	
18	Byron Scott	G	United States	Vancouver Grizzlies	Indiana Pacers	12	1995–1996	
19	Ed Pinckney	F	United States	Toronto Raptors	Milwaukee Bucks	10	1995–1996	
20	Gerald Wilkins	G/F	United States	Vancouver Grizzlies	Cleveland Cavaliers	9	1995–1996	
21	Acie Earl	F/C	United States	Toronto Raptors	Boston Celtics	2	1995–1997	
22	Benoit Benjamin	C	United States	Vancouver Grizzlies	New Jersey Nets	10	1995	
23	B. J. Tyler	G	United States	Toronto Raptors	Philadelphia 76ers	1	—^{[c]}	
24	Doug Edwards	F	United States	Vancouver Grizzlies	Atlanta Hawks	2	1995–1996	
25	John Salley	F/C	United States	Toronto Raptors	Miami Heat	9	1995–1996	
26	Blue Edwards	G/F	United States	Vancouver Grizzlies	Utah Jazz	6	1995–1998	
27	Oliver Miller	C	United States	Toronto Raptors	Detroit Pistons	3	1995–1996; 1997–1998	

== Notes ==
- ^{a} Number of years played in the NBA prior to the draft
- ^{b} Career with the expansion franchise that drafted the player
- ^{c} Never played a game for the franchise
- ^{d} Never played in the NBA prior to the expansion draft
- ^{e} Andrés Guibert defected from Cuba to Puerto Rico in 1993.
- ^{f} Žan Tabak represented SFR Yugoslavia national team prior to the dissolution of SFR Yugoslavia in 1992.

== Trades ==
Prior to the day of the draft, the following trades were made and resulted in exchanges of future draft picks between the teams, along with a particular agreement in the expansion draft.

- ^{A} The Vancouver Grizzlies agreed to select Rodney Dent from the Orlando Magic in exchange for a future second-round pick.
