= 1995–96 Toronto Raptors season =

NBA basketball season

- Head coach: Brendan Malone
- General manager: Isiah Thomas
- Owner: John Bitove
- Arena: SkyDome; Copps Coliseum

Results
- Record: 21–61 (.256)
- Place: Division: 8th (Central); Conference: 14th (Eastern)
- Playoff finish: Did not qualify
- Stats at Basketball Reference

Local media
- Television: TSN; CKVR; Citytv; CTV
- Radio: CFRB

The 1995–96 Toronto Raptors season was the inaugural season for the Toronto Raptors in the National Basketball Association. The Raptors, along with the Vancouver Grizzlies, became expansion teams in the NBA during the 1995–96 season, and were the first teams in the league (or its predecessor the Basketball Association of America), to play in Canada since the 1946–47 Toronto Huskies.

== Season summary ==
=== Off-season ===
The Raptors revealed their new primary logo, adding purple, red, black, white and silver to their color scheme; the team's primary logo featured a red dinosaur with silver eyes in a white uniform with a purple letter "R" on its jersey, dribbling a silver basketball in front of a black and purple circle featuring the city and team name in silver letters. The team also revealed new white home uniforms, and new purple road uniforms, which featured black and silver zig-zag pinstripes, the team's primary logo of a red dinosaur on the front of their jerseys, and a zig-zag shaped black side panel with a red outline on the left leg of their shorts. The home uniforms featured a purple, red and black trim, while the road uniforms featured a black and red trim.

The Raptors' new primary logo would remain in use until 2008, where the team changed the background of the circle from purple to red, while the original logo with the dinosaur would last until 2015; the new pinstriped uniforms would remain in use until 1999. Retired All-Star point guard, and former Detroit Pistons legend Isiah Thomas became the team's General Manager. The Raptors played their home games at the SkyDome in Toronto, Ontario, Canada, which was also home to the MLB's Toronto Blue Jays.

In the 1995 NBA expansion draft, the Raptors selected veteran players like B.J. Armstrong, Oliver Miller, Willie Anderson, Tony Massenburg, Ed Pinckney, Žan Tabak, Acie Earl and John Salley. However, Armstrong refused to play for the Raptors, and was traded to the Golden State Warriors in exchange for second-year forward Carlos Rogers and Victor Alexander. The team also signed free agents, former All-Star guard Alvin Robertson, and three-point specialist Tracy Murray. The Raptors received the seventh overall pick in the 1995 NBA draft, and selected point guard Damon Stoudamire from the University of Arizona, and also hired Brendan Malone as their first ever head coach.

=== Regular season ===
The Raptors made their NBA regular season debut on November 3, 1995, in which the team defeated the New Jersey Nets at the SkyDome by a score of 94–79; Robertson led the Raptors with 30 points, 7 rebounds and 5 steals. However, the team posted a seven-game losing streak afterwards, and later on held a 13–34 record at the All-Star break. At mid-season, the Raptors traded Anderson, and Alexander to the New York Knicks in exchange for Doug Christie, and then traded Massenburg, and Pinckney to the Philadelphia 76ers in exchange for second-year forward Sharone Wright. Meanwhile, Salley was released to free agency, and later on signed with the Chicago Bulls. The team posted another seven-game losing streak in February, and lost 12 of their final 15 games of the season. The Raptors finished their inaugural season in last place in the Central Division with a record of 21 wins and 61 losses.

Stoudamire averaged 19.0 points, 9.3 assists and 1.4 steals per game, contributed 133 three-point field goals, and was named the NBA Rookie of the Year, and was also named to the NBA All-Rookie First Team. In addition, Wright averaged 16.5 points and 5.2 rebounds per game in eleven games after the trade, while Murray contributed 16.2 points per game, and led the Raptors with 151 three-point field goals, Miller provided the team with 12.9 points, 7.4 rebounds, 1.4 steals and 1.9 blocks per game, Christie contributed 10.1 points and 1.8 steals per game in 32 games, and Robertson averaged 9.3 points, 4.4 rebounds, 4.2 assists and 2.2 steals per game. Off the bench, Tabak averaged 7.7 points and 4.8 rebounds per game, while Rogers provided with 7.7 points and 3.0 rebounds per game, and Earl contributed 7.5 points and 3.1 rebounds per game.

During the NBA All-Star weekend at the Alamodome in San Antonio, Texas, Stoudamire was selected for the NBA Rookie Game, as a member of the Eastern Conference Rookie team. Stoudamire scored 19 points along with 11 assists and 4 steals, and was named the Rookie Game's Most Valuable Player, as the Eastern Conference defeated the Western Conference, 94–92. Meanwhile, before the mid-season trade, Christie participated in the NBA Slam Dunk Contest while playing for the Knicks. Murray finished tied in fifth place in Most Improved Player voting.

The Raptors finished third in the NBA in home-game attendance, with an attendance of 950,330 at the SkyDome during the regular season.

=== Notable highlights ===
One notable highlight of the inaugural season occurred on March 24, 1996, in which the Raptors defeated the Bulls at the SkyDome by a score of 109–108, in front of 36,131 fans in attendance. Three players posted double-doubles, as Stoudamire finished with 30 points and 11 assists, and also made 6 out of 8 three-point field-goal attempts, while Murray added 23 points and 12 rebounds, and Miller contributed 14 points and 12 rebounds. All-Star guard Michael Jordan led the Bulls with 36 points; the Bulls went on to finish with a league-best 72–10 record.

=== Aftermath ===
Following the season, Malone was fired as head coach after only one season with the Raptors, while Murray signed as a free agent with the Washington Bullets, Miller signed with the Dallas Mavericks, and Robertson retired after ten seasons in the NBA.

== Offseason ==
=== Expansion draft ===
The team's roster was then filled as a result of an expansion draft in 1995. Following a coin flip, Toronto was given first choice and selected Chicago Bulls point guard and three-point specialist B. J. Armstrong. Armstrong refused to report for training, and Thomas promptly traded him to the Golden State Warriors for power forwards Carlos Rogers and Victor Alexander. Thomas then selected a wide range of players in the expansion draft.

Pick	Player	Position	Nationality	Former Team
1	B. J. Armstrong	Point guard	United States	Chicago Bulls
3	Tony Massenburg	Forward	United States	Los Angeles Clippers
5	Andrés Guibert	Forward-Centre	Cuba	Minnesota Timberwolves
7	Keith Jennings	Point guard	United States	Golden State Warriors
9	Dontonio Wingfield	Forward	United States	Seattle SuperSonics
11	Doug Smith	Forward	United States	Dallas Mavericks
13	Jerome Kersey	Small forward	United States	Portland Trail Blazers
15	Žan Tabak	Centre	Croatia	Houston Rockets
17	Willie Anderson	Guard-Forward	United States	San Antonio Spurs
19	Ed Pinckney	Forward	United States	Milwaukee Bucks
21	Acie Earl	Centre	United States	Boston Celtics
23	B. J. Tyler	Point guard	United States	Philadelphia 76ers
25	John Salley	Power forward	United States	Miami Heat
27	Oliver Miller	Centre	United States	Detroit Pistons

=== NBA draft ===
Subsequent to the expansion draft, the Raptors were given the seventh overall pick, after the Vancouver Grizzlies, in the 1995 NBA draft. They selected Damon Stoudamire, a point guard from the University of Arizona, around whom Thomas chose to base the franchise. The selection of Stoudamire was met with boos from fans at the 1995 NBA draft at the SkyDome in Toronto, Ontario, many of whom wanted 1995 NCAA Tournament Most Outstanding Player, Ed O'Bannon from the University of California, Los Angeles, who was taken with the ninth overall pick by the New Jersey Nets (and, unlike Stoudamire, would not have success and be out of the league after two seasons), The Raptors' second selection with the 35th overall pick was shooting guard Jimmy King from the University of Michigan, a senior and part of the recruiting class of 1991 that became known as The Fab Five.

Round	Pick	Player	Position	Nationality	College
1	7	Damon Stoudamire	Point Guard	United States	Arizona
2	35	Jimmy King	Shooting Guard	United States	Michigan

== Roster ==
1995–96 Toronto Raptors roster
Players

Pos.	No.	Player	Height	Weight	DOB	From
F	13	Doug Christie	6 ft 6 in (1.98 m)	200 lb (91 kg)	1970–05–09	Pepperdine
C	55	Acie Earl	6 ft 10 in (2.08 m)	240 lb (109 kg)	1970–06–23	Iowa
G	4	Vincenzo Esposito	6 ft 3 in (1.91 m)	198 lb (90 kg)	1969–03–01	Italy
G	24	Jimmy King	6 ft 5 in (1.96 m)	210 lb (95 kg)	1973–08–09	Michigan
F	44	Martin Lewis	6 ft 5 in (1.96 m)	210 lb (95 kg)	1975–04–28	Seward County CC
F	30	Oliver Miller	6 ft 9 in (2.06 m)	280 lb (127 kg)	1970–04–06	Arkansas
F	35	Tracy Murray	6 ft 7 in (2.01 m)	225 lb (102 kg)	1971–07–25	UCLA
C	52	Dan O'Sullivan	6 ft 10 in (2.08 m)	250 lb (113 kg)	1968–03–03	Fordham
G	7	Alvin Robertson	6 ft 3 in (1.91 m)	185 lb (84 kg)	1962–07–22	Arkansas
F	34	Carlos Rogers	6 ft 11 in (2.11 m)	220 lb (100 kg)	1971–02–06	Tennessee State
G	20	Damon Stoudamire (injured)	5 ft 10 in (1.78 m)	171 lb (78 kg)	1973–09–03	Arizona
C	3	Žan Tabak	7 ft 0 in (2.13 m)	245 lb (111 kg)	1970–06–15	Croatia
F	23	Dwayne Whitfield	6 ft 9 in (2.06 m)	240 lb (109 kg)	1972–08–21	Jackson State
C	9	Sharone Wright (injured)	6 ft 11 in (2.11 m)	260 lb (118 kg)	1973–01–30	Clemson

Coaches
Head coach
- Brendan Malone
Assistant(s)
- John Shumate
- Darrell Walker
- Bob Zuffelato

Legend
- (DP) Unsigned draft pick
- (FA) Free agent
- (S) Suspended
- Injured

Roster
Updated: April 18, 1996

=== Roster notes ===
- Point guard Keith Jennings was on the injured reserve list due to a preseason knee injury, and missed the entire regular season.
- Point guard B.J. Tyler was on the injured reserve list due to permanent nerve damage, after accidentally falling asleep with an ice pack on his ankle, missed the entire regular season, and never played for the Raptors.

== The first game ==
The Raptors' first ever regular season game was played on November 3, 1995, against the New Jersey Nets at the SkyDome in front of 33,306 fans. Alvin Robertson scored the first points in Raptors history, as he hit a three pointer to give Toronto an early 3–0 lead. The Raptors were led by Robertson, who scored a team high 30 points, as well as Damon Stoudamire, who had a double double in his first career game, scoring 10 points and adding 10 assists, as the Raptors defeated the Nets 94–79.

== Regular season ==
The team played its first season in the Central Division, and before the inaugural season began, sales of Raptors merchandise ranked seventh in the league, marking a successful return of basketball to Canada. As GM, Isiah Thomas quickly staffed the management positions with his own personnel, naming long-time Detroit Pistons assistant Brendan Malone as the Raptors' head coach.

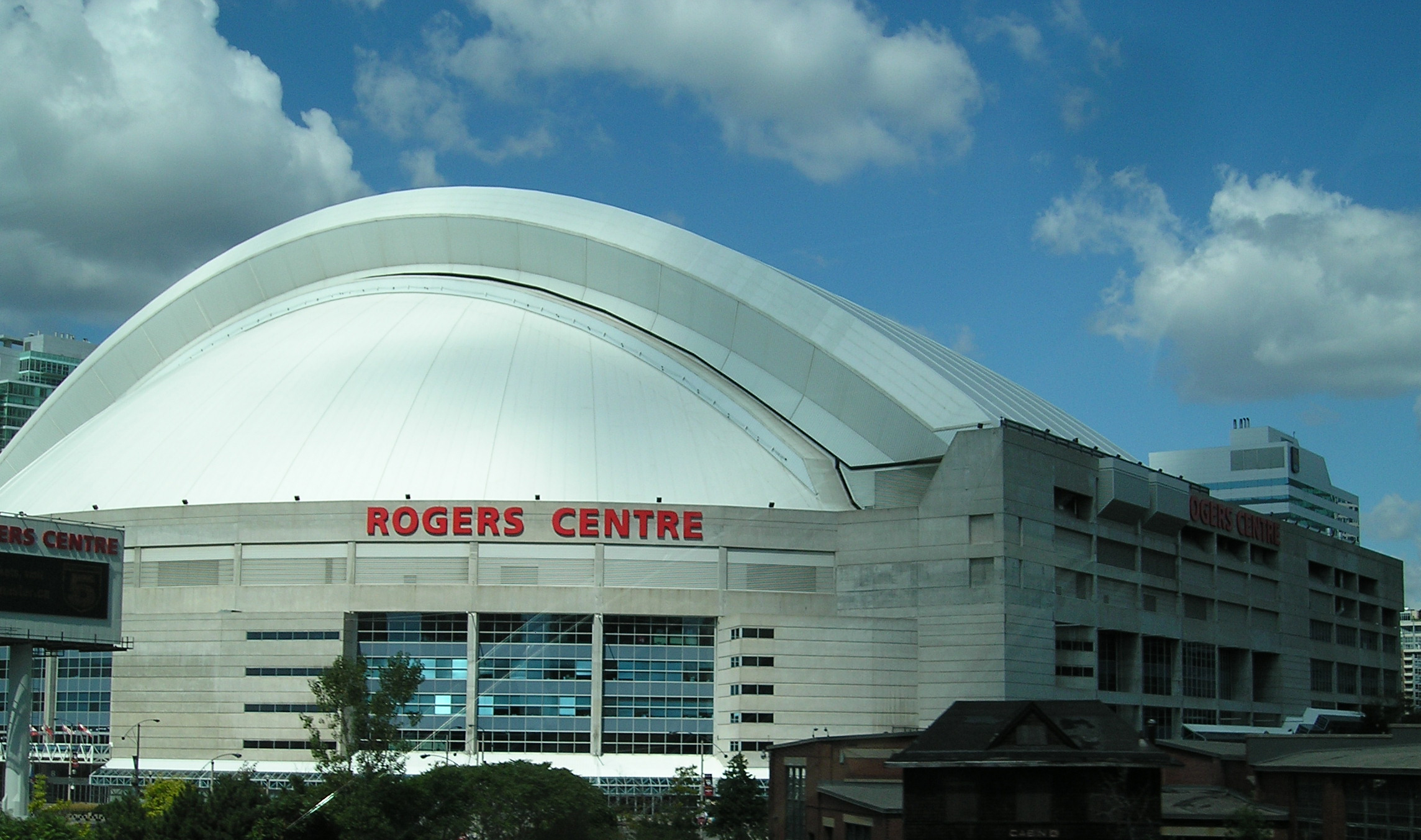
The Skydome — now the Rogers Centre — was the original arena for the Raptors between 1995 and 1999.

The Raptors concluded their inaugural season with a 21–61 win–loss record, although they were one of the nine teams to defeat the 1995–96 Chicago Bulls, who set an NBA best 72–10 win–loss regular season record. With averages of 19.0 points and 9.3 assists per game, Stoudamire also won the 1995–96 Rookie of the Year Award.

=== Highs ===
- December 10, 1995, The Raptors play the Vancouver Grizzlies for the first time. The game is held at General Motors Place in Vancouver. The Raptors win the game by a score of 93–81.
- March 24, 1996 – The Raptors beat the eventual NBA Champion Chicago Bulls by a score of 109–108, one of only ten losses the Bulls would suffer that season. Michael Jordan attempted to win the game on the final shot. Though the ball went in, it did not count because the ball left his hand after the final buzzer.
- March 31, 1996 – The legendary Magic Johnson played his only game against the Toronto Raptors in Toronto. The Los Angeles Lakers won the game by a score of 111–106.

==== Stoudamire's breakout year ====
Stoudamire had a noteworthy rookie season with the Toronto Raptors averaging 9.3 assists and 19 points. He earned the nickname "Mighty Mouse" due to the fact he stands only 5'10" (1.77 m), and that he had a Mighty Mouse tattoo on his right arm going into his rookie season. Damon currently holds the record of having the third-highest assist average ever by a rookie, and rookie record setter for 3-pointers with 133, breaking the 3-point record previously held by Dennis Scott. Stoudamire was ranked second in scoring among all rookies in his rookie season, and led all rookies in minutes played and assists. He received the Shick Rookie of the Month Award twice and unanimously made the Shick All Rookie First Team. That same year Stoudamire was also awarded the Rookie of the Year Award for the 1995–1996 season, receiving 76 of the 113 possible votes and the Most Valuable Player of the All-Star Rookie Game. Stoudamire holds the record for being the second-lowest draft pick (seventh overall) to ever win the Rookie of the Year Award, the lowest being Mark Jackson (eighteenth overall). Damon is also known as the shortest player at 5'10" to ever win this award. He did not play the last 10 games of his rookie season due to an injury, Tendinitis in his left knee. The Raptors went 2–8 without him and finished 21–61 in his and the Raptors' rookie season.

=== Lows ===
- November 15, 1995 – The Raptors lose to the Houston Rockets by a score of 96 – 93. The loss culminates in a seven-game losing streak for the Raptors, the longest losing streak of the season.
- February 29, 1996 – The seven-game losing streak was duplicated. In a loss to the San Antonio Spurs, the final score was 120 – 95.
- March 29, 1996 – The Raptors suffer their worst loss of the season. The score was 126–86 in favour of the Orlando Magic. Prior to the game, Isiah Thomas and Brendan Malone got into an argument regarding playing time for rookies.

=== Season standings ===
Central Division	W	L	PCT	GB	Home	Road	Div	GP
z–Chicago Bulls	72	10	.878	–	39‍–‍2	33‍–‍8	24–4	82
x–Indiana Pacers	52	30	.634	20.0	32‍–‍9	20‍–‍21	19–9	82
x–Cleveland Cavaliers	47	35	.573	25.0	26‍–‍15	21‍–‍20	13–15	82
x–Atlanta Hawks	46	36	.561	26.0	26‍–‍15	20‍–‍21	15–13	82
x–Detroit Pistons	46	36	.561	26.0	30‍–‍11	16‍–‍25	15–13	82
Charlotte Hornets	41	41	.500	31.0	25‍–‍16	16‍–‍25	13–15	82
Milwaukee Bucks	25	57	.305	47.0	14‍–‍27	11‍–‍30	8–20	82
Toronto Raptors	21	61	.256	51.0	15‍–‍26	6‍–‍35	5–23	82

Eastern Conference
#	Team	W	L	PCT	GB	GP
1	z–Chicago Bulls	72	10	.878	–	82
2	y–Orlando Magic	60	22	.732	12.0	82
3	x–Indiana Pacers	52	30	.634	20.0	82
4	x–Cleveland Cavaliers	47	35	.573	25.0	82
5	x–New York Knicks	47	35	.573	25.0	82
6	x–Atlanta Hawks	46	36	.561	26.0	82
7	x–Detroit Pistons	46	36	.561	26.0	82
8	x–Miami Heat	42	40	.512	30.0	82
9	Charlotte Hornets	41	41	.500	31.0	82
10	Washington Bullets	39	43	.476	33.0	82
11	Boston Celtics	33	49	.402	39.0	82
12	New Jersey Nets	30	52	.366	42.0	82
13	Milwaukee Bucks	25	57	.305	47.0	82
14	Toronto Raptors	21	61	.256	51.0	82
15	Philadelphia 76ers	18	64	.220	54.0	82

=== Game log ===
1995–96 game log
November: 5–10 (home: 4–4; road: 1–6)

Game	Date	Team	Score	High points	High rebounds	High assists	Location Attendance	Record
1	November 3	New Jersey	W 94–79	Alvin Robertson (30)	Alvin Robertson (7)	Damon Stoudamire (10)	SkyDome; 33,306	1–0
2	November 4	@ Indiana	L 89–97	Damon Stoudamire (26)	John Salley (9)	Damon Stoudamire (11)	Market Square Arena; 16,640	1-1
3	November 7	@ Chicago	L 108–117	Willie Anderson (23)	Oliver Miller (9)	Damon Stoudamire (10)	United Center; 23,102	1–2
4	November 8	Sacramento	L 90–109	Tracy Murray (22)	Oliver Miller (11)	Willie Anderson (4)	SkyDome; 16,793	1–3
5	November 10	Phoenix	L 108–112	Tracy Murray (23)	John Salley (11)	Damon Stoudamire (7)	SkyDome; 25,207	1–4
6	November 11	@ Charlotte	L 117–123 (OT)	Willie Anderson (24)	Willie Anderson (9)	Alvin Robertson (7)	Charlotte Coliseum; 24,042	1–5
7	November 13	Utah	L 100–103	Willie Anderson, Alvin Robertson (22)	Ed Pinckney (10)	Damon Stoudamire (9)	SkyDome; 18,351	1–6
8	November 15	Houston	L 93–96	Damon Stoudamire, Žan Tabak (20)	Žan Tabak (15)	Alvin Robertson (10)	SkyDome; 20,831	1–7
9	November 17	Minnesota	W 114–96	Damon Stoudamire (20)	Oliver Miller, Damon Stoudamire (7)	Damon Stoudamire (13)	SkyDome; 18,401	2–7
10	November 18	@ Washington	W 103–102	Damon Stoudamire (23)	Willie Anderson (9)	Damon Stoudamire (10)	USAir Arena; 18,756	3–7
11	November 21	Seattle	W 102–97	Oliver Miller (23)	Damon Stoudamire (12)	Damon Stoudamire (11)	SkyDome; 21,836	4–7
12	November 22	@ Milwaukee	L 86–96	Alvin Robertson (18)	Ed Pinckney (8)	Damon Stoudamire (9)	Bradley Center; 14,959	4–8
13	November 25	@ Atlanta	L 102–114	Tracy Murray (22)	Ed Pinckney (13)	Damon Stoudamire (9)	Omni Coliseum; 10,253	4–9
14	November 27	Golden State	W 101–98	Willie Anderson (26)	John Salley (9)	Damon Stoudamire (10)	SkyDome; 19,563	5–9
15	November 28	@ Cleveland	L 89–93	Damon Stoudamire (18)	Žan Tabak (8)	Willie Anderson (5)	Gund Arena; 15,188	5–10

December: 4–11 (home: 3–4; road: 1–7)

Game	Date	Team	Score	High points	High rebounds	High assists	Location Attendance	Record
16	December 1	Philadelphia	W 105–102	Willie Anderson (23)	Ed Pinckney (16)	Damon Stoudamire (10)	SkyDome; 19,789	6–10
17	December 3	Miami	L 94–112	Oliver Miller (29)	Ed Pinckney (12)	Damon Stoudamire (15)	SkyDome; 21,238	6–11
18	December 5	@ Seattle	L 89–119	Tracy Murray (23)	Oliver Miller, Alvin Robertson, Žan Tabak (5)	Alvin Robertson, Damon Stoudamire (5)	KeyArena; 17,072	6–12
19	December 7	@ Portland	L 88–96	Tracy Murray (28)	Ed Pinckney (15)	Damon Stoudamire (10)	Rose Garden; 20,039	6–13
20	December 8	@ L.A. Lakers	L 103–120	Damon Stoudamire (20)	Ed Pinckney (8)	Damon Stoudamire (10)	Great Western Forum; 12,982	6–14
21	December 10	@ Vancouver	W 93–81	Damon Stoudamire (24)	Ed Pinckney (16)	Damon Stoudamire (8)	General Motors Place; 17,438	7–14
22	December 12	Boston	L 96–116	Damon Stoudamire (18)	Ed Pinckney (8)	Damon Stoudamire (9)	SkyDome; 21,875	7–15
23	December 14	Indiana	L 100–102	Oliver Miller (22)	Oliver Miller (12)	Damon Stoudamire (13)	SkyDome; 19,763	7–16
24	December 15	@ Boston	L 103–122	Žan Tabak (18)	Žan Tabak (8)	Alvin Robertson, Damon Stoudamire (7)	FleetCenter; 17,580	7–17
25	December 17	Orlando	W 110–93	Damon Stoudamire (21)	Ed Pinckney (11)	Damon Stoudamire (10)	SkyDome; 25,820	8–17
26	December 19	Detroit	L 82–94	Damon Stoudamire (19)	Oliver Miller (11)	Damon Stoudamire (8)	SkyDome; 21,128	8–18
27	December 22	@ Chicago	L 104–113	Žan Tabak (24)	Damon Stoudamire, Žan Tabak (8)	Damon Stoudamire (13)	United Center; 22,987	8–19
28	December 23	@ New York	L 91–103	Damon Stoudamire (25)	Ed Pinckney (10)	Damon Stoudamire (8)	Madison Square Garden; 19,763	8-20
29	December 26	Milwaukee	W 93–87	Damon Stoudamire (21)	Ed Pinckney (9)	Damon Stoudamire (11)	Copps Coliseum; 17,242	9-20
30	December 28	@ Detroit	L 91–113	Damon Stoudamire (27)	Oliver Miller (7)	Damon Stoudamire (7)	The Palace of Auburn Hills; 21,454	9–21

January: 3–10 (home: 3–5; road: 0–5)

Game	Date	Team	Score	High points	High rebounds	High assists	Location Attendance	Record
31	January 3	@ Orlando	L 110–121	Alvin Robertson (27)	Oliver Miller (12)	Damon Stoudamire (13)	Orlando Arena; 17,248	9-22
32	January 4	@ Atlanta	L 101–104 (OT)	Alvin Robertson (21)	Willie Anderson, Ed Pinckney (7)	Damon Stoudamire (10)	Omni Coliseum; 7,194	9-23
33	January 9	Charlotte	L 91–92	Tracy Murray (25)	Tony Massenburg (8)	Alvin Robertson, Damon Stoudamire (8)	SkyDome; 20,326	9-24
34	January 11	Atlanta	L 79–87	Damon Stoudamire (18)	Tony Massenburg, Carlos Rogers, Žan Tabak (7)	Damon Stoudamire (9)	SkyDome; 19,868	9-25
35	January 13	Washington	W 106–100	Damon Stoudamire (29)	Tony Massenburg (11)	Damon Stoudamire (11)	SkyDome; 25,432	10–25
36	January 15	@ New Jersey	L 83–108	Damon Stoudamire (18)	Oliver Miller (9)	Damon Stoudamire (11)	Continental Airlines Arena; 10,034	10–26
37	January 16	Indiana	L 102–110	Damon Stoudamire (29)	Tony Massenburg (14)	Damon Stoudamire (10)	SkyDome; 19,868	10–27
38	January 18	Chicago	L 89–92	Damon Stoudamire (26)	Tony Massenburg (8)	Damon Stoudamire (12)	SkyDome; 36,118	10–28
39	January 21	Boston	W 97–95	Damon Stoudamire (23)	Tony Massenburg (14)	Damon Stoudamire (9)	SkyDome; 24,334	11–28
40	January 23	New Jersey	W 86–79	Tracy Murray (16)	Tony Massenburg (8)	Damon Stoudamire (11)	SkyDome; 20,915	12–28
41	January 25	Vancouver	L 101–106 (OT)	Damon Stoudamire (22)	Oliver Miller (13)	Damon Stoudamire (12)	SkyDome; 21,378	12–29
42	January 27	@ Denver	L 82–93	Damon Stoudamire (23)	Tony Massenburg (11)	Damon Stoudamire (5)	McNichols Sports Arena; 16,635	12–30
43	January 30	@ Sacramento	L 75–102	Oliver Miller (18)	Tony Massenburg (5)	Damon Stoudamire (6)	ARCO Arena; 17,317	12–31

February: 2–10 (home: 0–3; road: 2–7)

Game	Date	Team	Score	High points	High rebounds	High assists	Location Attendance	Record
44	February 2	@ Golden State	L 111–114	Damon Stoudamire (25)	Oliver Miller (7)	Damon Stoudamire (11)	Oakland Coliseum; 15,025	12–32
45	February 3	@ L.A. Clippers	W 119–113 (OT)	Damon Stoudamire (25)	Oliver Miller (11)	Damon Stoudamire (6)	Los Angeles Memorial Sports Arena; 5,846	13–32
46	February 5	Portland	L 87–90	Tracy Murray, Damon Stoudamire (16)	Tony Massenburg (10)	Damon Stoudamire (7)	SkyDome; 20,832	13–33
47	February 7	Milwaukee	L 88–93	Oliver Miller (21)	Oliver Miller (12)	Damon Stoudamire (6)	SkyDome; 21,335	13–34
48	February 13	@ Miami	W 98–87	Damon Stoudamire (29)	Alvin Robertson (12)	Damon Stoudamire (7)	Miami Arena; 14,286	14–34
49	February 15	Cleveland	L 76–95	Willie Anderson (17)	Oliver Miller (8)	Damon Stoudamire (7)	Copps Coliseum; 17,242	14–35
50	February 17	@ Detroit	L 95–108	Oliver Miller (25)	Tracy Murray (7)	Damon Stoudamire (9)	The Palace of Auburn Hills; 21,454	14–36
51	February 22	@ Utah	L 86–102	Damon Stoudamire (23)	Herb Williams (8)	Damon Stoudamire (6)	Delta Center; 19,911	14–37
52	February 23	@ Phoenix	L 105–110	Damon Stoudamire (29)	Oliver Miller (8)	Damon Stoudamire (10)	America West Arena; 19,023	14–38
53	February 25	@ Dallas	L 98–105	Damon Stoudamire (23)	Žan Tabak (16)	Damon Stoudamire (10)	Reunion Arena; 16,618	14–39
54	February 27	@ Houston	L 100–105	Tracy Murray (22)	Žan Tabak (10)	Damon Stoudamire (19)	The Summit; 16,200	14–40
55	February 29	@ San Antonio	L 95–120	Oliver Miller, Oliver Miller (13)	Oliver Miller (8)	Damon Stoudamire (5)	Alamodome; 18,083	14–41

March: 4–12 (home: 3–7; road: 1–5)

Game	Date	Team	Score	High points	High rebounds	High assists	Location Attendance	Record
56	March 3	@ Cleveland	W 100–89	Tracy Murray (29)	Doug Christie, Oliver Miller (5)	Doug Christie (6)	Gund Arena; 18,409	15–41
57	March 5	Detroit	L 84–105	Sharone Wright (25)	Oliver Miller (8)	Damon Stoudamire (6)	SkyDome; 22,968	15–42
58	March 6	New York	L 82–89	Sharone Wright (18)	Oliver Miller, Sharone Wright (8)	Damon Stoudamire (15)	SkyDome; 21,998	15–43
59	March 8	@ Miami	L 79–109	Vincenzo Esposito (12)	Oliver Miller (10)	Damon Stoudamire (5)	Miami Arena; 14,319	15–44
60	March 10	Dallas	W 128–112	Damon Stoudamire (25)	Žan Tabak (14)	Damon Stoudamire (9)	SkyDome; 21,873	16–44
61	March 12	@ Philadelphia	L 110–118	Tracy Murray (31)	Oliver Miller (11)	Doug Christie, Alvin Robertson (8)	CoreStates Spectrum; 8,806	16–45
62	March 15	@ Charlotte	L 101–113	Oliver Miller, Damon Stoudamire, Sharone Wright (20)	Oliver Miller (10)	Damon Stoudamire (11)	Charlotte Coliseum; 24,042	16–46
63	March 17	@ Indiana	L 96–105	Damon Stoudamire (23)	Tracy Murray (9)	Damon Stoudamire (12)	Market Square Arena; 16,579	16–47
64	March 18	Denver	L 114–122	Tracy Murray (40)	Oliver Miller (9)	Damon Stoudamire (16)	SkyDome; 20,324	16–48
65	March 20	Charlotte	W 107–89	Carlos Rogers, Damon Stoudamire (24)	Oliver Miller (15)	Damon Stoudamire (10)	SkyDome; 22,033	17–48
66	March 22	San Antonio	L 108–120	Tracy Murray (29)	Oliver Miller (12)	Damon Stoudamire (13)	SkyDome; 25,964	17–49
67	March 24	Chicago	W 109–108	Damon Stoudamire (30)	Oliver Miller, Tracy Murray (12)	Damon Stoudamire (11)	SkyDome; 36,131	18–49
68	March 26	Atlanta	L 111–114	Tracy Murray, Damon Stoudamire (30)	Oliver Miller, Tracy Murray (9)	Damon Stoudamire (12)	SkyDome; 21,473	18–50
69	March 27	@ Philadelphia	L 94–103	Žan Tabak (26)	Žan Tabak (11)	Alvin Robertson (6)	CoreStates Spectrum; 7,411	18–51
70	March 29	Orlando	L 86–126	Damon Stoudamire (15)	Carlos Rogers (9)	Damon Stoudamire (5)	SkyDome; 35,681	18–52
71	March 31	L.A. Lakers	L 106–111	Tracy Murray (32)	Tracy Murray (10)	Damon Stoudamire (15)	SkyDome; 36,046	18–53

April: 3–8 (home: 2–3; road: 1–5)

Game	Date	Team	Score	High points	High rebounds	High assists	Location Attendance	Record
72	April 2	L.A. Clippers	W 104–103 (OT)	Tracy Murray (30)	Oliver Miller (15)	Damon Stoudamire (12)	SkyDome; 21,135	19–53
73	April 4	Cleveland	L 77–98	Dwayne Whitfield (16)	Dwayne Whitfield (12)	Jimmy King (6)	SkyDome; 21,173	19–54
74	April 6	New York	L 106–139	Tracy Murray (23)	Tracy Murray (8)	Doug Christie, Oliver Miller (5)	SkyDome; 23,168	19–55
75	April 8	@ Minnesota	L 101–115	Doug Christie, Tracy Murray (21)	Oliver Miller, Alvin Robertson (10)	Alvin Robertson (7)	Target Center; 13,011	19–56
76	April 9	@ Milwaukee	W 102–96	Alvin Robertson (25)	Alvin Robertson (10)	Doug Christie, Alvin Robertson (6)	Bradley Center; 15,935	20–56
77	April 12	@ Boston	L 108–136	Acie Earl (40)	Acie Earl (12)	Jimmy King (6)	FleetCenter; 17,930	20–57
78	April 14	@ Washington	L 97–110	Acie Earl (26)	Oliver Miller (17)	Oliver Miller (5)	USAir Arena; 18,756	20–58
79	April 15	@ New York	L 79–125	Acie Earl (25)	Acie Earl (11)	Jimmy King (8)	Madison Square Garden; 19,763	20–59
80	April 17	@ New Jersey	L 95–107	Acie Earl (28)	Alvin Robertson (13)	Alvin Robertson (8)	Continental Airlines Arena; 14,688	20–60
81	April 19	Washington	W 107–103	Doug Christie (30)	Oliver Miller (13)	Oliver Miller (9)	SkyDome; 24,454	21–60
82	April 21	Philadelphia	L 105–109 (OT)	Oliver Miller (35)	Oliver Miller (12)	Oliver Miller, Alvin Robertson (9)	SkyDome; 27,118	21–61

1995–96 season schedule

== Player statistics ==
= Indicates team leader

=== Regular season ===
Player	POS	GP	GS	MP	REB	AST	STL	BLK	PTS	MPG	RPG	APG	SPG	BPG	PPG
Tracy Murray	SF	82	37	2,458	352	131	87	40	1,325	30.0	4.3	1.6	1.1	.5	16.2
Alvin Robertson	SG	77	69	2,478	342	323	166	36	718	32.2	4.4	4.2	2.2	.5	9.3
Oliver Miller	PF	76	72	2,516	562	219	108	143	982	33.1	7.4	2.9	1.4	1.9	12.9
Damon Stoudamire	PG	70	70	2,865	281	653	98	19	1,331	40.9	4.0	9.3	1.4	.3	19.0
Žan Tabak	C	67	18	1,332	320	62	24	31	514	19.9	4.8	.9	.4	.5	7.7
Jimmy King	SG	62	1	868	110	88	21	13	279	14.0	1.8	1.4	.3	.2	4.5
Carlos Rogers	PF	56	18	1,043	170	35	25	48	430	18.6	3.0	.6	.4	.9	7.7
Willie Anderson^{†}	SG	49	42	1,564	186	149	58	51	606	31.9	3.8	3.0	1.2	1.0	12.4
Ed Pinckney^{†}	PF	47	24	1,031	282	50	31	17	328	21.9	6.0	1.1	.7	.4	7.0
Acie Earl	C	42	7	655	129	27	18	37	316	15.6	3.1	.6	.4	.9	7.5
Doug Christie^{†}	SF	32	17	818	120	92	58	16	322	25.6	3.8	2.9	1.8	.5	10.1
Vincenzo Esposito	PG	30	0	282	16	23	7	0	116	9.4	.5	.8	.2	.0	3.9
John Salley^{†}	PF	25	6	482	97	39	11	12	149	19.3	3.9	1.6	.4	.5	6.0
Tony Massenburg^{†}	PF	24	20	659	166	18	13	9	243	27.5	6.9	.8	.5	.4	10.1
Martin Lewis	SF	16	0	189	29	3	8	3	75	11.8	1.8	.2	.5	.2	4.7
Sharone Wright^{†}	C	11	6	298	57	11	6	10	181	27.1	5.2	1.0	.5	.9	16.5
Dwayne Whitfield	PF	8	1	122	25	2	3	2	40	15.3	3.1	.3	.4	.3	5.0
Dan O'Sullivan	C	5	2	139	32	2	2	4	33	27.8	6.4	.4	.4	.8	6.6
Herb Williams^{†}	C	1	0	31	8	0	1	2	6	31.0	8.0	.0	1.0	2.0	6.0

- ^{†} Denotes player spent time with another team in the season. Stats reflect time with the Raptors only.

== Franchise firsts ==
Point: Alvin Robertson

== Award winners ==
- Damon Stoudamire, First Team, NBA All-Rookie Team
- Damon Stoudamire, NBA Rookie of the Year Award
- Damon Stoudamire, NBA Schick Rookie Game, MVP

== Transactions ==
=== Trades ===
September 18, 1995	To Toronto Raptors Victor Alexander; Martin Lewis; Michael McDonald; Carlos Rogers; Dwayne Whitfield	To Golden State Warriors B. J. Armstrong

February 18, 1996	To Toronto Raptors Doug Christie; Herb Williams; Cash	To New York Knicks Victor Alexander; Willie Anderson

February 22, 1996	To Toronto Raptors Sharone Wright	To Philadelphia 76ers Tony Massenburg; Ed Pinckney; 1996 second-round pick 1997 second-round pick

=== Free agents ===
Additions
Player	Date signed	Former team
Alvin Robertson	October 5	Detroit Pistons
Thomas Hamilton	October 6	none
Tracy Murray	November 1	Houston Rockets
Dwayne Whitfield	February 23	Golden State Warriors
Dan O'Sullivan (10-day)	April 9	Shreveport Storm (CBA)

Subtractions
Player	Date signed	New Team
Doug Smith	October 4	Boston Celtics
Jerome Kersey	October 4	Golden State Warriors
Thomas Hamilton	October 18	Boston Celtics
Dwayne Whitfield	November 2	Toronto Raptors
John Salley	February 2	Chicago Bulls
Herb Williams	February 23	New York Knicks
Dan O'Sullivan	April 18	Scavolini Pesaro (Italy)

Player transactions citation:
