= Doug Christie =

American basketball player and coach (born 1970)

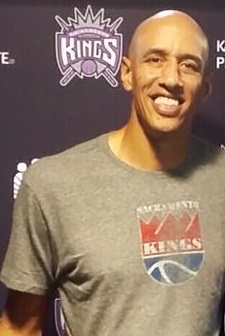
- Christie in 2015

Sacramento Kings
- Title: Head coach
- League: NBA

Personal information
- Born: May 9, 1970 (age 56) Seattle, Washington, U.S.
- Listed height: 6 ft 6 in (1.98 m)
- Listed weight: 205 lb (93 kg)

Career information
- High school: Mark Morris (Longview, Washington); Rainier Beach (Seattle, Washington)
- College: Pepperdine (1989–1992)
- NBA draft: 1992: 1st round, 17th overall pick
- Drafted by: Seattle SuperSonics
- Playing career: 1992–2007
- Position: Shooting guard
- Number: 35, 8, 7, 13, 1, 21
- Coaching career: 2021–present

Career history

Playing
- 1993–1994: Los Angeles Lakers
- 1994–1996: New York Knicks
- 1996–2000: Toronto Raptors
- 2000–2005: Sacramento Kings
- 2005: Orlando Magic
- 2005: Dallas Mavericks
- 2007: Los Angeles Clippers

Coaching
- 2021–2024: Sacramento Kings (assistant)
- 2024–present: Sacramento Kings

Career highlights
- NBA All-Defensive First Team (2003); 3× NBA All-Defensive Second Team (2001, 2002, 2004); 2× WCC Player of the Year (1991, 1992); 2× First-team All-WCC (1991, 1992)

Career NBA statistics
- Points: 9,301 (11.2 ppg)
- Rebounds: 3,382 (4.1 rpg)
- Steals: 1,555 (1.9 spg)
- Stats at NBA.com
- Stats at Basketball Reference

Douglas Dale Christie (born May 9, 1970) is an American professional basketball coach and former player who is the head coach for the Sacramento Kings of the National Basketball Association (NBA).

Standing at 6 ft 6 in (1.98 m), Christie played the shooting guard position. He played college basketball for the Pepperdine Waves. After being selected with the 17th overall pick in the 1992 NBA draft, Christie played for seven teams in a 15-season NBA career. He was a starter for the Sacramento Kings during the early 2000s and played for the Kings in the NBA playoffs in four consecutive years. Known for his defense, Christie made the NBA All-Defensive First Team once and made the NBA All-Defensive Second Team three times during his Kings tenure.

Christie became an assistant coach for the Kings in 2021.

== Early life and college career ==
Born in Seattle, Washington, Christie is the son of John Malone and Norma Christie. He was raised in Seattle by his mother. Christie is biracial; his father is black and his mother is white.

Christie played basketball in seventh & eighth grade at Cascade Middle School and for Mark Morris High School in Longview, WA during his freshman and sophomore years. He had moved to Longview to live with his father, former Mark Morris track star John Malone. He later attended Seattle's Rainier Beach High School. In his senior year at Rainier Beach High, Christie led the school's varsity boys' basketball team to their first-ever Washington state championship. He also was named the high school player of the year in the state of Washington.

Christie graduated from Rainier Beach High in 1988. He then went on to Pepperdine University, studying sociology. Christie led Pepperdine to the NCAA Tournament twice, averaging over 19 points per game during his final two seasons. He was twice named WCC Player of the Year.

== Professional career ==
=== Los Angeles Lakers (1993–1994) ===
Christie was selected 17th overall in the 1992 NBA draft by the Seattle SuperSonics. However, Christie and the Sonics failed to agree upon a contract, and he did not play for the team. On February 22, 1993, Christie and Benoit Benjamin were traded to the Los Angeles Lakers in exchange for Sam Perkins. The Lakers signed Christie several days after acquiring him, and he made his NBA debut on March 12, 1993. In his first Lakers game, Christie's jersey bore the incorrect name "Chrisite". He was used sparingly in Los Angeles his rookie year.

Christie's usage went up his second season, as he started 34 of 65 games and averaged 10.3 points per game. He played with Vlade Divac in LA, who he would eventually team with in Sacramento to challenge the Lakers in multiple playoff series.

=== New York Knicks (1994–1996) ===
Just prior to the start of the 1994–95 season, the Lakers traded Christie to the New York Knicks for two second-round draft picks. Christie only played twelve games that season because of an ankle injury.

Christie competed in the 1996 Slam Dunk Contest. Despite this, he was unable to crack new coach Don Nelson's rotation for the 1995–96 season, and requested a trade.

=== Toronto Raptors (1996–2000) ===
On February 18, 1996, Christie was traded alongside Herb Williams to the expansion Toronto Raptors in exchange for Willie Anderson and Victor Alexander (Williams would be released by Toronto and re-signed by the Knicks following the trade). On March 24, 1996, Christie helped the 17–49 Raptors defeat the 60–9 record-breaking Chicago Bulls in one of the bigger upsets in NBA history. In Jordan’s 12 games against the Raptors from 1996–98, he averaged 24.7 points on 47.4 percent shooting—both numbers were below his averages against the rest of the league over that time—a credit to Christie's defense.

In his first full season in Toronto, Christie started 81 games, averaging 14.5 points, 5.3 rebounds and 2.5 steals per game, finishing second in Most Improved Player of the Year voting.

The following season, he averaged 16.5 points, 5.2 rebounds and 2.4 steals per game. In the 1999–00 season, alongside Tracy McGrady, Charles Oakley and Vince Carter, Christie helped Toronto to their first ever playoff appearance.

=== Sacramento Kings (2000–2005) ===
In August 2000, Christie was traded to the Sacramento Kings in exchange for forward Corliss Williamson. In Sacramento, Christie became the Kings' popular starting shooting guard and developed into one of the league's best defenders. While in Sacramento, Christie was named to the NBA All-Defensive First Team once and to the All-Defensive Second Team three times. During the 2000–01 season, Sports Illustrated dubbed the Kings' starting five of Jason Williams, Peja Stojaković, Chris Webber, Vlade Divac, and Christie "The Greatest Show on Court". Christie's defense helped the Kings rise in the NBA ranks, becoming a perennial playoff contender and eventually a championship contender. The Kings led the league in wins in the 2001–02 NBA season and made the playoffs in each of Christie's seasons with the team.

=== Orlando Magic (2005) ===
In 2005, Christie was traded to the Orlando Magic for Cuttino Mobley and Michael Bradley. He left the Kings as second all-time in total steals. He was unhappy about the trade and played only a few games before being sidelined with bone spurs. Following Christie's ankle surgery, the Orlando Magic released him on August 11, 2005, under the new NBA collective bargaining agreement one-time amnesty clause.

=== Dallas Mavericks (2005) ===
Christie signed a one-year contract with the Dallas Mavericks shortly thereafter.

Due to a slow healing surgically repaired left ankle, Christie was waived by the Dallas Mavericks on November 25, 2005, signaling his impending retirement. He had left the team the week prior to have his surgically repaired left ankle examined by his personal physician. In seven games with the Dallas Mavericks as a starter, Christie averaged 3.7 points and 2.0 assists.

=== Los Angeles Clippers (2007) ===
In January 2007, Christie attempted a comeback when he signed a 10-day contract with the Los Angeles Clippers. After the All-Star break, Christie, on his second 10-day contract, decided to part ways with the team.

== Other endeavors ==
In 2014, Christie was named to a team assembled by Dennis Rodman as part of his "basketball diplomacy" effort in North Korea with the job of playing an exhibition match against the North Korean Senior National Team to celebrate the birthday of Kim Jong-un.

Christie began working as a color commentator for Sacramento Kings games on NBC Sports in the 2018–19 season.

== Coaching career ==
Christie left NBC to become an assistant coach for the Sacramento Kings in August 2021. He was named interim head coach of the Kings on December 27, 2024, after Mike Brown was fired. On May 1, 2025, the interim tag was removed, and Christie was named as the head coach of the Kings.

== Personal life ==
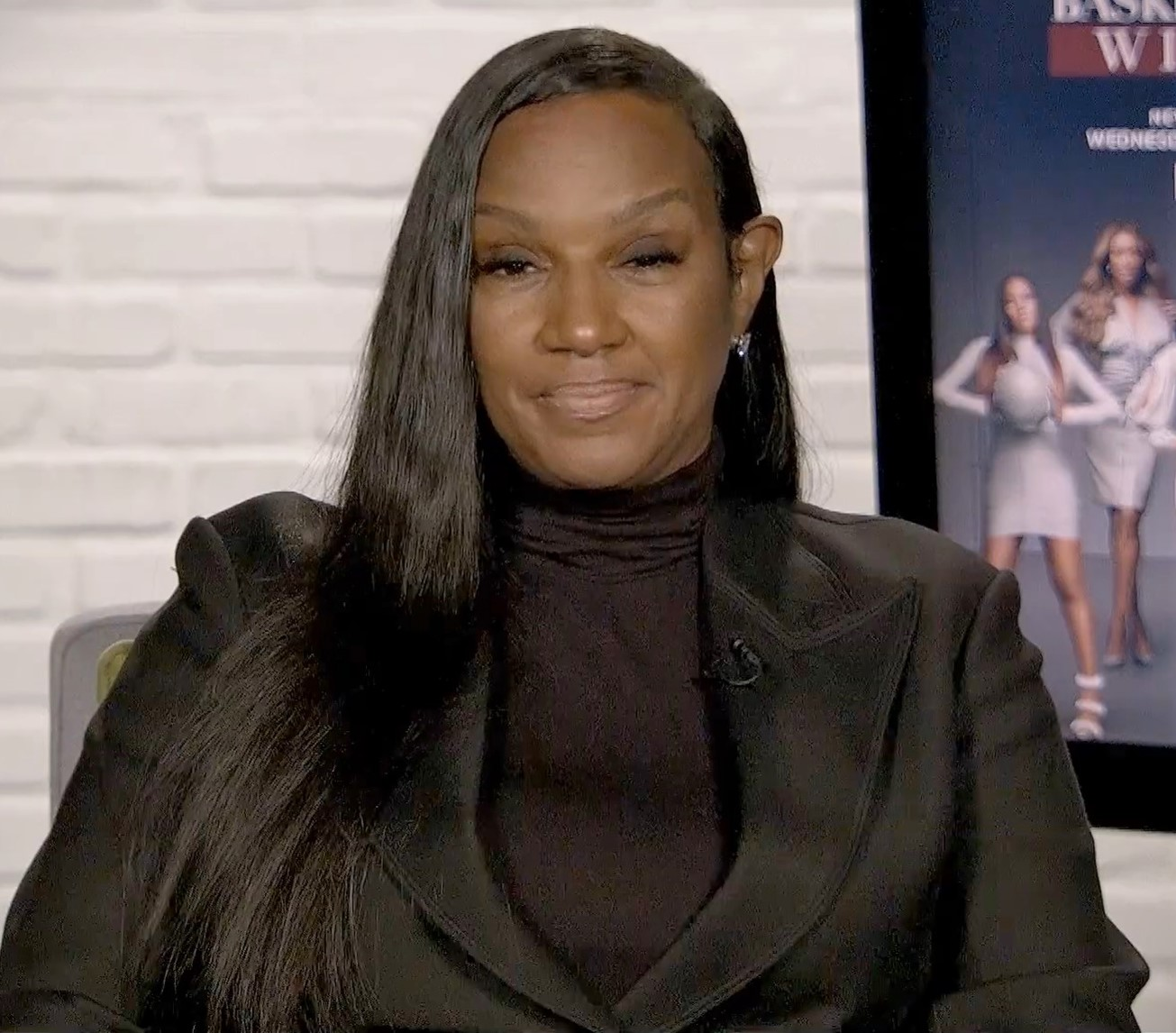
Jackie Christie in 2019

Christie and his wife Jackie were married on July 8, 1996. They have two children. In 2002, The New York Times published a feature story in which the Christies spoke about their marriage and committed lifestyle. As of 2002, the Christies renewed their wedding vows every year on their wedding anniversary.

Christie is a devout Christian.

In 2006, BET's BET J launched the reality show The Christies Committed, featuring the Christies' struggle to balance family and celebrity life. Christie has also appeared alongside his wife on the long running VH1 show Basketball Wives. In 2007, Christie sold 1,800 copies of The Christie’s Un-Cut, a self-made comedy which features the Christies in numerous satirical sketches.

== Career statistics ==
Legend
GP	Games played	GS	Games started	MPG	Minutes per game
FG%	Field goal percentage	3P%	3-point field goal percentage	FT%	Free throw percentage
RPG	Rebounds per game	APG	Assists per game	SPG	Steals per game
BPG	Blocks per game	PPG	Points per game	**Bold**	Career high

=== NBA ===
==== Regular season ====
Year	Team	GP	GS	MPG	FG%	3P%	FT%	RPG	APG	SPG	BPG	PPG
1992–93	L.A. Lakers	23	0	14.4	.425	.167	.758	2.2	2.3	1.0	.2	6.2
1993–94	L.A. Lakers	65	34	23.3	.434	.328	.697	3.6	2.1	1.4	.4	10.3
1994–95	New York	12	0	6.6	.227	.143	.800	1.1	.7	.2	.1	1.3
1995–96	New York	23	0	9.5	**.479**	**.526**	.591	1.5	1.1	.5	.1	4.0
1995–96	Toronto	32	17	25.6	.436	.414	.789	3.8	2.9	1.8	.5	10.1
1996–97	Toronto	81	81	**38.6**	.417	.384	.775	5.3	3.9	**2.5**	.3	14.5
1997–98	Toronto	78	78	37.7	.428	.326	.829	**5.2**	3.6	2.4	**.7**	**16.5**
1998–99	Toronto	50	50	35.4	.388	.304	.841	4.1	3.7	2.3	.5	15.2
1999–00	Toronto	73	73	31.0	.407	.360	.843	3.9	4.4	1.4	.6	12.4
2000–01	Sacramento	81	81	36.3	.395	.376	.897	4.4	3.6	2.3	.6	12.3
2001–02	Sacramento	81	81	34.5	.460	.352	.851	4.6	4.2	2.0	.3	12.0
2002–03	Sacramento	80	80	33.9	.479	.395	.810	4.3	4.7	2.3	.5	9.4
2003–04	Sacramento	**82**	**82**	33.9	.461	.345	.860	4.0	4.2	1.8	.5	10.1
2004–05	Sacramento	31	31	32.1	.407	.256	.893	4.0	**4.9**	1.4	.4	7.3
2004–05	Orlando	21	13	25.2	.367	.217	**.909**	2.6	2.2	1.8	.2	5.7
2005–06	Dallas	7	7	26.4	.346	.000	.667	1.9	2.0	1.3	.1	3.7
2006–07	L.A. Clippers	7	0	11.7	.294	.167	.667	1.6	1.1	.4	.1	1.9
Career		827	708	31.5	.426	.354	.821	4.1	3.6	1.9	.5	11.2

==== Playoffs ====
Year	Team	GP	GS	MPG	FG%	3P%	FT%	RPG	APG	SPG	BPG	PPG
1993	L.A. Lakers	5	0	7.8	.364	.333	—	.8	1.2	.4	.4	1.8
1995	New York	2	0	3.0	.000	—	—	.0	.0	.0	.0	0.0
2000	Toronto	3	1	20.3	.231	.375	.500	1.7	2.0	1.3	.3	4.0
2001	Sacramento	8	8	38.0	.368	.294	.828	4.4	3.3	**2.5**	**1.1**	9.9
2002	Sacramento	**16**	**16**	**40.3**	**.409**	.266	.800	5.8	**4.9**	2.1	.6	11.1
2003	Sacramento	12	12	31.8	.374	.250	**.935**	**6.2**	4.6	1.0	.3	9.1
2004	Sacramento	12	12	38.4	.397	**.394**	.854	**6.2**	3.9	1.8	.4	**13.8**
Career		58	49	32.7	.382	.302	.832	4.9	3.8	1.6	.5	9.5

== Head coaching record ==
Legend
Regular season	G	Games coached	W	Games won	L	Games lost	W–L %	Win–loss %
Playoffs	PG	Playoff games	PW	Playoff wins	PL	Playoff losses	PW–L %	Playoff win–loss %

Team	Year	G	W	L	W–L%	Finish	PG	PW	PL	PW–L%	Result
Sacramento	2024–25	51	27	24	.529	4th in Pacific	—	—	—	—	Missed playoffs
Sacramento	2025–26	82	22	60	.268	5th in Pacific	—	—	—	—	Missed playoffs
Career		133	49	84	.368		0	0	0	–	

== See also ==
- List of National Basketball Association career steals leaders
- List of National Basketball Association single-game steals leaders
