= 2004–05 Cleveland Cavaliers season =

NBA professional basketball team season

- Head coach: Paul Silas (fired); Brendan Malone (interim)
- President: Jim Paxson
- General manager: Jim Paxson
- Owners: Gordon Gund; George Gund III
- Arena: Gund Arena

Results
- Record: 42–40 (.512)
- Place: Division: 4th (Central); Conference: 9th (Eastern)
- Playoff finish: Did not qualify
- Stats at Basketball Reference

Local media
- Television: FSN Ohio; WUAB
- Radio: WTAM

The 2004–05 Cleveland Cavaliers season was the 35th season of the franchise in the National Basketball Association (NBA) in Cleveland, Ohio. During the offseason, the Cavaliers acquired Drew Gooden from the Orlando Magic, and Eric Snow from the Philadelphia 76ers. In his second season, expectations were high for LeBron James as the Cavaliers hoped for a playoff berth. Through the first half of the season, the Cavs held a 30–21 record at the All-Star Break as James was selected to his first All-Star selection in the 2005 NBA All-Star Game along with Zydrunas Ilgauskas. However, as March began, the Cavaliers were unable to upgrade at the trading deadline as the team went on a six-game losing streak. Head coach Paul Silas was fired and replaced by interim Brendan Malone. LeBron was named to the All-NBA Second Team, and finished in sixth place in MVP voting.

The Cavaliers finished the season with a 42–40 record, a fourth-place finish in the Central Division, and barely missed out of the playoffs, losing a tiebreaker for the #8 seed in the Eastern Conference to the New Jersey Nets. This was the seventh straight year that the Cavs missed the playoffs. Despite their collapse, James had an outstanding sophomore season averaging 27.2 points, 7.4 rebounds and 7.2 assists per game. This was the last time that LeBron missed the playoffs until his first season with the Los Angeles Lakers in 2019.

Key dates:

- On June 24, the 2004 NBA draft, took place in New York City, New York.
- In July, the free agency period began.
- On September 15, the Cavaliers named Brendan Malone assistant coach.
- On October 14, the Cavaliers' preseason began with a 94–102 loss to Memphis.
- On November 3, the Cavaliers' regular season began with a 104–109 2OT loss to Indiana.
- On March 21, head coach Paul Silas was fired and Brendan Malone was named interim head coach. Mike Bratz and Wes Wilcox were added to Malone's staff as assistants.
- On April 20, the Cavaliers' season ended in a 104–95 win over the Toronto Raptors.
- On April 21, Jim Paxson was fired as President of Basketball Operations and general manager.

== Offseason ==
=== Free agents ===
Additions
Player	Date	Former team
Robert Traylor	August 5	New Orleans Hornets
Anderson Varejão	August 19	Cleveland Cavaliers
Scott Williams	September 28	Dallas Mavericks
Lucious Harris	October 1	New Jersey Nets

Subtractions
Player	Date	New team
Jason Kapono^{*}	June 22	Charlotte Bobcats
Carlos Boozer	July 29	Utah Jazz
Lee Nailon	September 30	New Orleans Hornets

^{*}Selected in expansion draft

=== Trades ===
June 23, 2004	To Cleveland Cavaliers Sasha Pavlović	To Charlotte Bobcats Future 1st round pick

July 20, 2004	To Cleveland Cavaliers Eric Snow	To Philadelphia 76ers Kedrick Brown and Kevin Ollie

July 23, 2004	To Cleveland Cavaliers Drew Gooden, Anderson Varejão, and Steven Hunter	To Orlando Magic Tony Battie and two future 2nd round picks

== Draft picks ==
Round	Pick	Player	Position	Nationality	School/Club team
1	10	Luke Jackson	Guard	United States	Oregon

- 2nd round pick (#39) traded to Toronto in Michael Stewart deal. Used to draft Albert Miralles who was then traded to Miami.

== Roster ==
2004–05 Cleveland Cavaliers roster
Players

Pos.	No.	Player	Height	Weight	DOB	From
C	52	DeSagana Diop	7 ft 0 in (2.13 m)	300 lb (136 kg)	1982-01-30	Oak Hill Academy
F	90	Drew Gooden	6 ft 10 in (2.08 m)	250 lb (113 kg)	1981-09-24	Kansas
G	12	Lucious Harris	6 ft 5 in (1.96 m)	190 lb (86 kg)	1970-12-18	Long Beach State
C	11	Zydrunas Ilgauskas	7 ft 3 in (2.21 m)	260 lb (118 kg)	1975-06-05	Lithuania
G	33	Luke Jackson	6 ft 7 in (2.01 m)	215 lb (98 kg)	1981-11-06	Oregon
F	23	LeBron James	6 ft 8 in (2.03 m)	240 lb (109 kg)	1984-12-30	St. Vincent-St. Mary HS (OH)
G	0	Jeff McInnis	6 ft 4 in (1.93 m)	179 lb (81 kg)	1974-10-22	North Carolina
F	14	Ira Newble	6 ft 7 in (2.01 m)	220 lb (100 kg)	1975-01-20	Miami (OH)
G	3	Sasha Pavlović	6 ft 7 in (2.01 m)	210 lb (95 kg)	1983-11-15	Serbia
G	20	Eric Snow	6 ft 3 in (1.91 m)	205 lb (93 kg)	1973-04-24	Michigan State
F/C	32	Robert Traylor	6 ft 8 in (2.03 m)	290 lb (132 kg)	1977-02-01	Michigan
F/C	17	Anderson Varejão	6 ft 10 in (2.08 m)	240 lb (109 kg)	1982-09-28	Brazil
G	2	Dajuan Wagner	6 ft 2 in (1.88 m)	200 lb (91 kg)	1983-02-04	Memphis
G/F	44	Jiří Welsch	6 ft 7 in (2.01 m)	210 lb (95 kg)	1980-01-27	Czech Republic
F/C	47	Scott Williams	6 ft 10 in (2.08 m)	230 lb (104 kg)	1968-03-21	North Carolina

Coaches
Head coach
- Paul Silas
- Brendan Malone
Assistant(s)
- Mike Bratz
- Brendan Malone
- Kenny Natt
- Stephen Silas
- Wes Wilcox

Legend
- (DP) Unsigned draft pick
- (FA) Free agent
- (S) Suspended
- Injured

Roster
Updated: February 24, 2005

== Regular season ==
=== Season standings ===
Central Division	W	L	PCT	GB	Home	Road	Div
y-Detroit Pistons	54	28	.659	–	32–9	22–19	8–8
x-Chicago Bulls	47	35	.573	7	27–14	20–21	8–8
x-Indiana Pacers	44	38	.537	10	25–16	19–22	9–7
e-Cleveland Cavaliers	42	40	.512	12	29–12	13–28	7–9
e-Milwaukee Bucks	30	52	.366	24	23–18	7–34	8–8

Eastern Conference
#	Team	W	L	PCT	GB
1	c-Miami Heat	59	23	.720	–
2	y-Detroit Pistons	54	28	.659	5
3	y-Boston Celtics	45	37	.549	14
4	x-Chicago Bulls	47	35	.573	12
5	x-Washington Wizards	45	37	.549	14
6	x-Indiana Pacers	44	38	.537	15
7	x-Philadelphia 76ers	43	39	.524	16
8	x-New Jersey Nets	42	40	.512	17
9	e-Cleveland Cavaliers	42	40	.512	17
10	e-Orlando Magic	36	46	.439	23
11	e-New York Knicks	33	49	.402	26
12	e-Toronto Raptors	33	49	.402	26
13	e-Milwaukee Bucks	30	52	.366	29
14	e-Charlotte Bobcats	18	64	.220	41
15	e-Atlanta Hawks	13	69	.159	46

== Game log ==
2004–05 game log
Total: 42–40 (Home: 29–12; Road: 13–28)
November: 9–5 (home: 6–1; road: 3–4)

Game	Date	Team	Score	High points	High rebounds	High assists	Location Attendance	Record

December : 8–7 (home: 5–2; road: 3–5)

Game	Date	Team	Score	High points	High rebounds	High assists	Location Attendance	Record

January : 9–5 (home: 5–1; road: 4–4)

Game	Date	Team	Score	High points	High rebounds	High assists	Location Attendance	Record

February : 5–7 (home: 5–2; road: 0–5)

Game	Date	Team	Score	High points	High rebounds	High assists	Location Attendance	Record

March : 6–9 (home: 5–3; road: 1–6)

Game	Date	Team	Score	High points	High rebounds	High assists	Location Attendance	Record

April : 5–7 (home: 3–3; road: 2–4)

Game	Date	Team	Score	High points	High rebounds	High assists	Location Attendance	Record

2004–05 schedule

== Player stats ==
Legend
GP	Games played	GS	Games started	MPG	Minutes per game
FG%	Field-goal percentage	3P%	3-point field-goal percentage	FT%	Free-throw percentage
RPG	Rebounds per game	APG	Assists per game	SPG	Steals per game
BPG	Blocks per game	PPG	Points per game

=== Regular season ===
Player	GP	GS	MPG	FG%	3P%	FT%	RPG	APG	SPG	BPG	PPG
DeSagana Diop	39	0	7.8	.290	.000	.000	1.8	.4	.21	.69	1.0
Drew Gooden	82	80	30.8	.492	.179	.810	9.2	1.6	.94	.93	14.4
Lucious Harris	73	4	15.5	.395	.323	.812	1.7	.7	.37	.08	4.3
Žydrūnas Ilgauskas	78	78	33.5	.468	.286	.799	8.6	1.3	.68	2.12	16.9
Luke Jackson	10	0	4.3	.370	.667	.833	.6	.3	.00	.00	2.9
LeBron James	80	80	42.4	.472	.351	.750	7.4	7.2	2.21	.65	27.2
Jeff McInnis	76	69	34.9	.412	.345	.813	2.1	5.1	.74	.01	12.8
Jérôme Moïso*	4	0	6.8	.600	.000	.000	1.8	.3	.25	.50	1.5
Ira Newble	74	69	24.8	.429	.358	.797	3.0	1.2	.68	.24	5.9
Aleksandar Pavlović	65	9	13.3	.435	.385	.688	1.1	.8	.45	.06	4.8
Eric Snow	81	15	22.8	.382	.289	.738	1.9	3.9	.83	.20	4.0
Robert Traylor	74	6	17.9	.444	.000	.539	4.5	.8	.73	.68	5.5
Anderson Varejão	54	0	16.0	.513	.000	.535	4.8	.5	.76	.70	4.9
Dajuan Wagner	11	0	9.3	.327	.192	.750	.2	1.2	.45	.00	4.0
Jiří Welsch*	16	0	12.0	.235	.182	.714	1.8	1.2	.31	.00	2.9
Scott Williams	19	0	8.0	.293	.000	.818	1.6	.4	.21	.32	1.7

* Statistics include only games with the Cavaliers

== Awards and records ==
=== All-Star ===
LeBron James voted as a starter for the 2005 NBA All-Star Game. He appeared for the first time in the All-Star Game.

Zydrunas Ilgauskas - 2005 NBA All-Star Game
