= Marcus Webb =

American basketball player (born 1970)

Personal information
- Born: May 9, 1970 (age 56) Montgomery, Alabama, U.S.
- Listed height: 6 ft 9 in (2.06 m)
- Listed weight: 255 lb (116 kg)

Career information
- High school: Sidney Lanier (Montgomery, Alabama)
- College: Alabama (1988–1992)
- NBA draft: 1992: undrafted
- Playing career: 1992–2005
- Position: Power forward
- Number: 41

Career history
- 1992: Atlanta Eagles
- 1992–1993: Boston Celtics
- 1993: Tainos de Cabo Rojo
- 1993–1994: Pau-Orthez
- 1994–1995: Tofaş Bursa
- 1995–1996: Chicago Rockers
- 1996: Piratas de Quebradillas
- 1996–1998: CSKA Moscow
- 1998–1999: Beşiktaş
- 1999–2000: APOEL Nicosia
- 2000: Pınar Karşıyaka
- 2001: Lokomotiv Novosibirsk
- 2004–2005: Obras Sanitarias

Career highlights
- 2× Russian Superleague Champion (1997, 1998)
- Stats at NBA.com
- Stats at Basketball Reference

Marcus Lataives Webb (born May 9, 1970) is an American former professional basketball player who played briefly in the National Basketball Association (NBA).

== High school ==
Born and raised in Montgomery, Alabama, Webb played at basketball at Sidney Lanier High School.

== College career ==
Webb played college basketball at the University of Alabama, with the Alabama Crimson Tide.

== Professional career ==
Webb was selected with the 28th overall selection, of the 1992 Continental Basketball Association (CBA) Draft. He played in nine games with the NBA's Boston Celtics, during the 1992–93 season, averaging 4.3 points and 1.1 rebounds per game.

He last played professionally in Argentina in 2005.
