= 1992 NBA draft =

Basketball player selection

General information
- Sport: Basketball
- Date: June 24, 1992
- Location: Memorial Coliseum (Portland, Oregon)
- Network: TNT

Overview
- 54 total selections in 2 rounds
- League: NBA
- First selection: Shaquille O'Neal (Orlando Magic)
- Hall of Famers: 2: C Shaquille O'Neal; C Alonzo Mourning

The 1992 NBA draft took place on June 24, 1992, at Memorial Coliseum in Portland, Oregon. The top three picks (Shaquille O'Neal, Alonzo Mourning, Christian Laettner) were considered can't-miss prospects. All three are Hall of Famers (Naismith & FIBA); O'Neal and Mourning are (individual) player-inducted, whereas Laettner is team-inducted. Laettner made one All-Star game in his career and was an Olympic Gold Medalist on the 1992 Dream Team, but did not live up to the lofty expectations set for him. The trio would end up playing together on the 2005 Miami Heat. Two other players went on to become All-Stars (Tom Gugliotta once, Latrell Sprewell four times) and several others had solid careers (Jimmy Jackson, Robert Horry, Doug Christie, P.J. Brown, LaPhonso Ellis, Jon Barry, Walt Williams, Anthony Peeler, and Clarence Weatherspoon). Harold Miner, who was given the nickname "Baby Jordan" because of his similarities to Michael Jordan, slipped to number 12 and, other than winning two slam dunk contests, only had a brief, uneventful, and injury prone four-year career.

This was the first time the NBA draft was held outside of New York.

== Draft selections ==
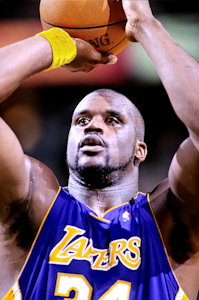
Shaquille O'Neal, the 1st pick to the Orlando Magic

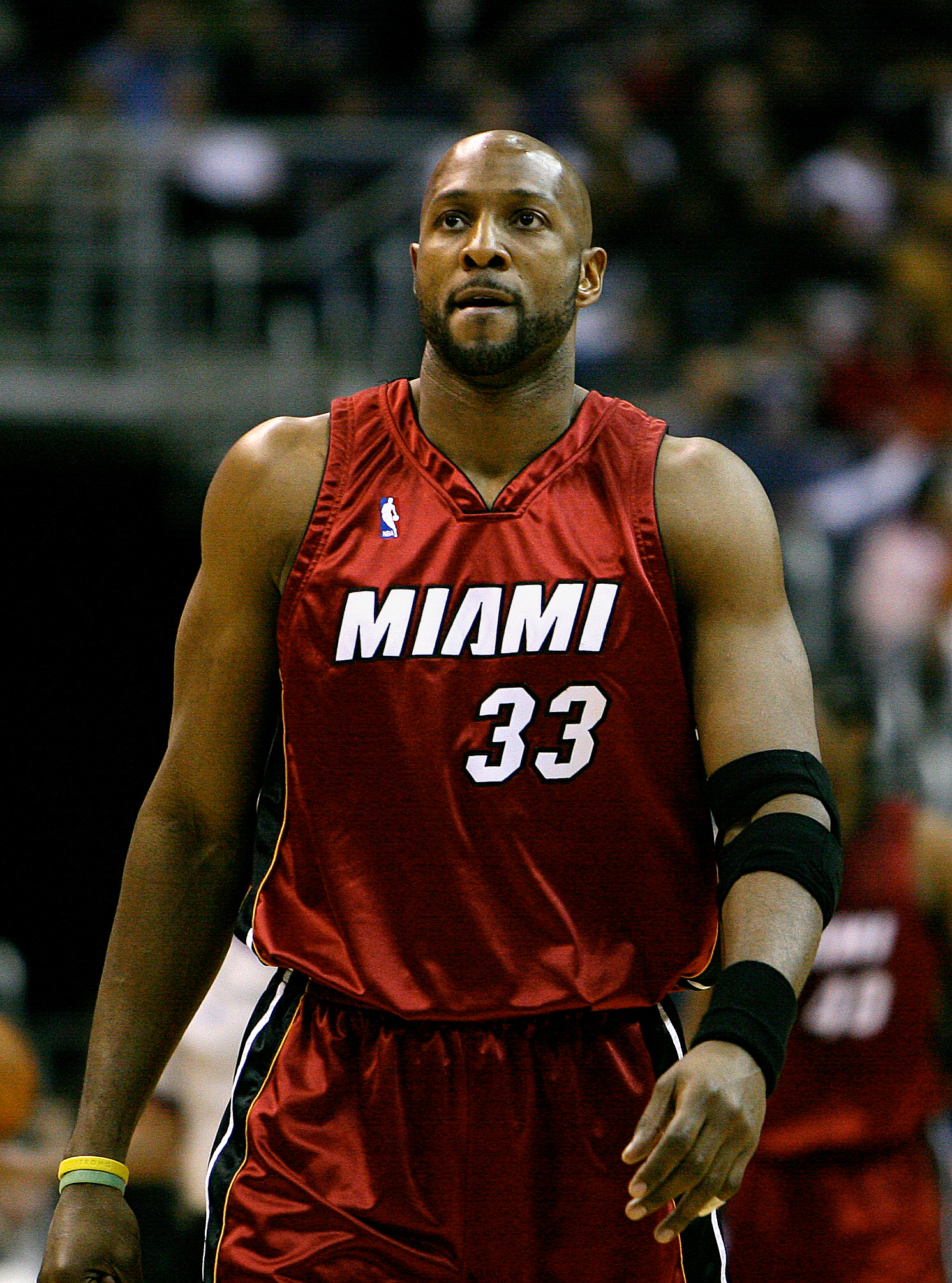
Alonzo Mourning, the 2nd pick to the Charlotte Hornets

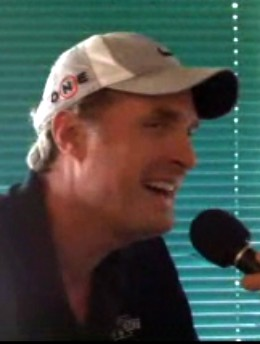
Christian Laettner, the 3rd pick to the Minnesota Timberwolves

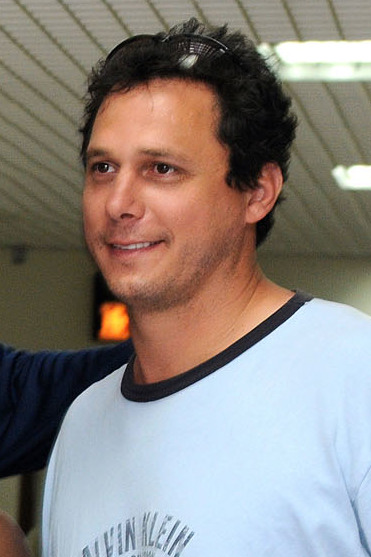
Tom Gugliotta, the 6th pick to the Washington Bullets

G	Guard	PG	Point guard	SG	Shooting guard	F	Forward	SF	Small forward	PF	Power forward	C	Center

^	Denotes player who has been inducted to the Naismith Memorial Basketball Hall of Fame
*	Denotes player who has been selected for at least one All-Star Game and All-NBA Team
^{+}	Denotes player who has been selected for at least one All-Star Game
^{x}	Denotes player who has been selected for at least one All-NBA Team
^{#}	Denotes player who has never appeared in an NBA regular-season or playoff game
^{~}	Denotes player who has been selected as Rookie of the Year

Round	Pick	Player	Pos.	Nationality (Note: Nationality indicates the player's national team or representative nationality. If a player has not competed at the international level, then the nationality indicates the national team which the player is eligible to represent according to FIBA rules.)	Team	School / club team
1	1	Shaquille O'Neal^~	C	United States	Orlando Magic	LSU (Jr.)
1	2	Alonzo Mourning^	C	United States	Charlotte Hornets	Georgetown (Sr.)
1	3	Christian Laettner^{+}	PF	United States	Minnesota Timberwolves	Duke (Sr.)
1	4	Jimmy Jackson	SG	United States	Dallas Mavericks	Ohio State (Jr.)
1	5	LaPhonso Ellis	PF	United States	Denver Nuggets	Notre Dame (Sr.)
1	6	Tom Gugliotta^{+}	PF	United States	Washington Bullets	NC State (Sr.)
1	7	Walt Williams	SF	United States	Sacramento Kings	Maryland (Sr.)
1	8	Todd Day	SG	United States	Milwaukee Bucks	Arkansas (Sr.)
1	9	Clarence Weatherspoon	PF	United States	Philadelphia 76ers	Southern Miss (Sr.)
1	10	Adam Keefe	PF	United States	Atlanta Hawks	Stanford (Sr.)
1	11	Robert Horry	SF	United States	Houston Rockets	Alabama (Sr.)
1	12	Harold Miner	SG	United States	Miami Heat	USC (Jr.)
1	13	Bryant Stith	SG	United States	Denver Nuggets (from New Jersey)	Virginia (Sr.)
1	14	Malik Sealy	SF	United States	Indiana Pacers	St. John's (Sr.)
1	15	Anthony Peeler	SG	United States	Los Angeles Lakers	Missouri (Sr.)
1	16	Randy Woods	PG	United States	Los Angeles Clippers	La Salle (Sr.)
1	17	Doug Christie	SG	United States	Seattle SuperSonics	Pepperdine (Sr.)
1	18	Tracy Murray	SF	United States	San Antonio Spurs	UCLA (Jr.)
1	19	Don MacLean	PF	United States	Detroit Pistons (traded to Washington via L.A. Clippers)	UCLA (Sr.)
1	20	Hubert Davis	SG	United States	New York Knicks	North Carolina (Sr.)
1	21	Jon Barry	SG	United States	Boston Celtics	Georgia Tech (Sr.)
1	22	Oliver Miller	C	United States	Phoenix Suns	Arkansas (Sr.)
1	23	Lee Mayberry	PG	United States	Milwaukee Bucks (from Utah)	Arkansas (Sr.)
1	24	Latrell Sprewell*	SG	United States	Golden State Warriors	Alabama (Sr.)
1	25	Elmore Spencer	C	United States	Los Angeles Clippers (from Cleveland)	UNLV (Sr.)
1	26	Dave Johnson	SF	United States	Portland Trail Blazers	Syracuse (Sr.)
1	27	Byron Houston	PF	United States	Chicago Bulls	Oklahoma State (Sr.)
2	28	Marlon Maxey	PF	United States	Minnesota Timberwolves	UTEP
2	29	P. J. Brown	PF	United States	New Jersey Nets	Louisiana Tech
2	30	Sean Rooks	PF/C	United States	Dallas Mavericks	Arizona
2	31	Reggie Smith	C	United States	Portland Trail Blazers	TCU
2	32	Brent Price	G	United States	Washington Bullets	Oklahoma
2	33	Corey Williams	G	United States	Chicago Bulls	Oklahoma State
2	34	Chris Smith	G	United States	Minnesota Timberwolves	Connecticut
2	35	Tony Bennett	G	United States	Charlotte Hornets	Wisconsin–Green Bay
2	36	Duane Cooper	G	United States	Los Angeles Lakers	USC
2	37	Isaiah Morris	F	United States	Miami Heat	Arkansas
2	38	Elmer Bennett	G	United States	Atlanta Hawks	Notre Dame
2	39	Litterial Green	G	United States	Chicago Bulls	Georgia
2	40	Steve Rogers^{#}	SG/SF	United States	New Jersey Nets	Alabama State
2	41	Popeye Jones	F	United States	Houston Rockets	Murray State
2	42	Matt Geiger	C	United States	Miami Heat	Georgia Tech
2	43	Predrag Danilović	SG	FR Yugoslavia	Golden State Warriors	KK Partizan (Yugoslavia)
2	44	Henry Williams^{#}	G	United States	San Antonio Spurs	UNC-Charlotte
2	45	Chris King	F	United States	Seattle SuperSonics	Wake Forest
2	46	Robert Werdann	C	United States	Denver Nuggets	St. John's
2	47	Darren Morningstar	C	United States	Boston Celtics	Pittsburgh
2	48	Brian Davis	F/G	United States	Phoenix Suns	Duke
2	49	Ron Ellis^{#}	PF	United States	Phoenix Suns	Louisiana Tech
2	50	Matt Fish	F	United States	Golden State Warriors	UNC-Wilmington
2	51	Tim Burroughs^{#}	PF	United States	Minnesota Timberwolves	Jacksonville
2	52	Matt Steigenga	F	United States	Chicago Bulls	Michigan State
2	53	Curtis Blair^{#}	PG	United States	Houston Rockets	Richmond
2	54	Brett Roberts^{#}	SF	United States	Sacramento Kings	Morehead State

== Notable undrafted players ==
These players were not selected in the 1992 NBA draft but have played at least one game in the NBA.

Player	Pos.	Nationality	School/club team
Gary Alexander	F	United States	South Florida (Sr.)
Eric Anderson	PF	United States	Indiana (Sr.)
Mark Baker	PG	United States	Ohio State (Sr.)
Alex Blackwell	SF	United States	Monmouth (Sr.)
Marques Bragg	PF	United States	Providence (Sr.)
Tim Breaux	SF	United States	Wyoming (Sr.)
Dexter Cambridge	PF	The Bahamas	Texas (Sr.)
Joe Courtney	PF	United States	Southern Miss (Sr.)
Rastko Cvetković	C	FR Yugoslavia; Serbia	Crvena zvezda (Yugoslavia)
Dell Demps	PG/SG	United States	Pacific (Sr.)
Harold Ellis	SG	United States	Morehouse (Sr.)
Jo Jo English	SG	United States	South Carolina (Sr.)
Shane Heal	PG	Australia	Brisbane Bullets (Australia)
Stephen Howard	SF	United States	DePaul (Sr.)
Chris Jent	SG/SF	United States	Ohio State (Sr.)
Sam Mack	SF	United States	Houston (Sr.)
Gerald Madkins	PG	United States	UCLA (Sr.)
Bob Martin	C	United States	Minnesota (Sr.)
Darrick Martin	PG	United States	UCLA (Sr.)
Matt Othick	PG	United States	Arizona (Sr.)
Reggie Slater	PF	United States	Wyoming (Sr.)
Mark Strickland	SF/PF	United States	Temple (Sr.)
Keith Tower	C	United States	Notre Dame (Sr.)
Anthony Tucker	SF	United States	Wake Forest (Sr.)
Marcus Webb	PF	United States	Alabama (Jr.)
David Wesley	PG	United States	Baylor (Sr.)

== Early entrants ==
=== College underclassmen ===
For the tenth year in a row and the fourteenth time in fifteen years, no college underclassman would withdraw their entry into the NBA draft. Not only that, but this would also be the first year since 1985 where no underclassmen playing overseas would enter the NBA draft and would be the first draft since 1986 with no foreign-born underclassmen as well. This year would see a total of sixteen college underclassmen entering the draft. The following college basketball players successfully applied for early draft entrance.

- (United States) Ameer Aziz – F, Saint Paul's (Virginia) (junior)
- (United States) John Beauford – C, Southern Poly (junior)
- (United States) Anthony Cade – F, Seminole JC (sophomore)
- (United States) Mark Chappell – G, Iowa State (junior)
- (United States) Dallas Lee Cothrum – G, Austin (junior)
- (United States) Jim Jackson – G, Ohio State (junior)
- (United States) Troy King – F, Beaver County CC (sophomore)
- (United States) Benny Maxwell – G, Western New Mexico (junior)
- (United States) Harold Miner – G, USC (junior)
- (United States) Tracy Murray – F, UCLA (junior)
- (United States) Shaquille O'Neal – C, LSU (junior)
- (United States) Melvin Robinson – C, Arizona State (junior)
- (United States) Tony Scott – F, Texas A&M (junior)
- (United States) Jeff Theiler – F, La Verne (junior)
- (United States) Mike Wawrzyniak – G, Cleveland State (junior)
- (United States) Marcus Webb – F, Alabama (junior)

== Invited attendees ==
The 1992 NBA draft is considered to be the fifteenth NBA draft to have utilized what's properly considered the "green room" experience for NBA prospects. The NBA's green room is a staging area where anticipated draftees often sit with their families and representatives, waiting for their names to be called on draft night. Often being positioned either in front of or to the side of the podium (in this case, being positioned somewhere within the Veterans Memorial Coliseum building in Portland, Oregon), once a player heard his name, he would walk to the podium to shake hands and take promotional photos with the NBA commissioner. From there, the players often conducted interviews with various media outlets while backstage. From there, the players often conducted interviews with various media outlets while backstage. However, once the NBA draft started to air nationally on TV starting with the 1980 NBA draft, the green room evolved from players waiting to hear their name called and then shaking hands with these select players who were often called to the hotel to take promotional pictures with the NBA commissioner a day or two after the draft concluded to having players in real-time waiting to hear their names called up and then shaking hands with David Stern, the NBA's commissioner at the time. The NBA compiled its list of green room invites through collective voting by the NBA's team presidents and general managers alike, which in this year's case belonged to only what they believed were the top 14 prospects at the time. Despite the large amount of invites and them successfully avoiding any inviting prospects waiting into the second round (to the point where four errors were in mind from getting a perfectly ordered invited attendees line-up this time around), the only notable absence from this group would be (the controversial) Latrell Sprewell from the University of Alabama. With that in mind, the following players were invited to attend this year's draft festivities live and in person.

- (United States) Doug Christie – SG, Pepperdine
- (United States) Todd Day – SG, Arkansas
- (United States) LaPhonso Ellis – PF, Notre Dame
- (United States) Tom Gugliotta – PF, North Carolina State
- (United States) Robert Horry – SF, Alabama
- (United States) Jimmy Jackson – SG, Ohio State
- (United States) Harold Miner – SG, USC
- (United States) Alonzo Mourning – C, Georgetown
- (United States) Tracy Murray – SF, UCLA
- (United States) Shaquille O'Neal – C, LSU
- (United States) Malik Sealy – SF, St. John's
- (United States) Bryant Stith – SG, Virginia
- (United States) Clarence Weatherspoon – PF, Southern Mississippi
- (United States) Walt Williams – SF, Maryland

== See also ==
- List of first overall NBA draft picks
