= Tracy Murray =

American basketball player (born 1971)

Personal information
- Born: July 25, 1971 (age 55) Los Angeles, California, U.S.
- Listed height: 6 ft 7 in (2.01 m)
- Listed weight: 230 lb (104 kg)

Career information
- High school: Glendora (Glendora, California)
- College: UCLA (1989–1992)
- NBA draft: 1992: 1st round, 18th overall pick
- Drafted by: San Antonio Spurs
- Playing career: 1992–2007
- Position: Small forward
- Number: 31, 35, 30, 3
- Coaching career: 2007–2016

Career history

Playing
- 1992–1995: Portland Trail Blazers
- 1995: Houston Rockets
- 1995–1996: Toronto Raptors
- 1996–2000: Washington Bullets / Wizards
- 2000–2001: Denver Nuggets
- 2001–2002: Toronto Raptors
- 2002–2003: Los Angeles Lakers
- 2003: Portland Trail Blazers
- 2004–2005: Panathinaikos
- 2005–2006: P.A.O.K.
- 2006–2007: Élan Chalon

Coaching
- 2007–2009: Bakersfield Jam (assistant)
- 2011: Tulsa Shock (assistant)
- 2015: Los Angeles Lakers (assistant)

Career highlights
- NBA champion (1995); 2× First-team All-Pac-10 (1991, 1992); Pac-10 All-Freshman team (1990); McDonald's All-American (1989); California Mr. Basketball (1989)

Career NBA statistics
- Points: 5,943 (9.0 ppg)
- Rebounds: 1,649 (2.5 rpg)
- Assists: 508 (0.8 apg)
- Stats at NBA.com
- Stats at Basketball Reference
Medals
Men's basketball
Representing United States
Pan American Games
Bronze medal – third place	1991 Havana	Team competition

Tracy Lamont Murray (born July 25, 1971) is an American former professional basketball player who works as an analyst with the UCLA Sports Network for all of the games during the UCLA Bruins' basketball season. Tracy is also a part-time analyst on the Slam Dunk Show on ABC7 Los Angeles. He worked as an assistant coach for the Los Angeles Lakers of the National Basketball Association (NBA) for the 2015–16 NBA season.

== High school and college career ==
Murray played competitively at Glendora High School in California. As a senior, he led the nation with his 44.3 scoring average. Murray scored 3,053 points in high school, the highest total ever in the state at that time in 3 years. Murray holds the California state record for the most points in a CIF championship game, scoring 64 points. Murray missed his Freshman year due to injury. Murray played on the 1989 McDonald's All-American Boys Game for the West roster.

Murray played college basketball for the UCLA Bruins. In 98 games at UCLA, Murray averaged 18.3 PPG, 6.4 RPG, and 1.5 APG and made the Pac-10 all-conference team twice. As a junior, he averaged 21.4 points and 7.0 rebounds and led the Pac-10 in three-point shooting at 50%, helping to lead the team to the Elite Eight. After his junior season of college, Murray declared for the 1992 NBA draft. Murray left UCLA in the #5 spot on The Bruins All-Time Leading Scoring List.

Murray was inducted into the UCLA Athletics Hall of Fame as a member of the 2021 class.

== Professional career ==
=== Spurs, Bucks and Blazers ===
Murray was selected by the San Antonio Spurs in the first round of the 1992 NBA draft with the 18th overall selection. Just seven days after being drafted, on July 1, 1992, Murray was dealt twice in the same day. He was first traded to the Milwaukee Bucks for guard/forward Dale Ellis and then dealt by the Bucks to the Portland Trail Blazers for forward Alaa Abdelnaby. During the 93–94 season, he led the NBA in three point average at 45.9%. Murray spent two-and-a-half seasons with Portland before being dealt to the Houston Rockets on February 14, 1995, with guard Clyde Drexler in exchange for forward Otis Thorpe, the rights to Argentinian forward Marcelo Nicola and a 1995 first-round draft choice.

=== Rockets and Raptors ===
Tracy Murray played in just 25 games for the Rockets where he averaged 3.5 PPG and combined with his 5.9 PPG average in the 29 games he played as a Trail Blazer before the deal finished the campaign with a total PPG average of 4.8. On November 1, 1995, he signed a contract with the expansion Toronto Raptors and played the best NBA season of his career averaging 16.2 PPG, 1.6 APG and 4.3 RPG. Murray then decided to sign a contract with the Washington Bullets (now Washington Wizards) on July 15, 1996.

=== Washington Wizards ===
He spent four seasons with the Washington Wizards and in his first season with the Bullets, qualified for the post-season. It was only the second time in his career that he had been able to participate in the playoffs, with the first time being the 1993–94 season. Tracy saw action in three playoff games where he posted numbers of 18.3 PPG, 0.7 APG and 3.0 RPG. Those numbers were far better than the ones he had when he played in his first playoff series in 1993–94 with Portland where in 2 games played he averaged 3.0 PPG, 0.5 APG, and 1.5 RPG. He most notably scored 50 points against the Golden State Warriors on February 10, 1998. Only seven other Washington players have scored 50 or more points in a game, including Michael Jordan, Bradley Beal, and Gilbert Arenas, who are the only players to have since accomplished the feat.

=== Nuggets, Raptors and Lakers ===
After his tenure with Washington concluded he joined the Denver Nuggets through a transaction which had him going from the Wizards to Denver for forward Popeye Jones and a future second-round draft choice on September 25, 2000. After appearing in 13 games with the Nuggets he was dealt on January 12, 2001, to the Raptors with center/forward Keon Clark and center Mamadou N'diaye for centers Kevin Willis, Aleksandar Radojević, Garth Joseph and a 2001 or 2002 second-round draft choice. Murray played in 38 games with the Raptors following the deal. That season the Raptors qualified for the NBA playoffs and Murray participated in 2 games for his team. He averaged 1.0 PPG and had 1 steal in 2.5 MPG.

In the next year Tracy played in 40 games for Toronto but after the season Murray was dealt again, this time to the Los Angeles Lakers along with the draft rights to guard Kareem Rush for guard Lindsey Hunter and the draft rights to forward Chris Jefferies on June 26, 2002.

=== Back with the Trail Blazers ===
After playing one season at the Staples Center for the Los Angeles Lakers he signed with the Portland Trail Blazers on September 15, 2003, and played his last 7 games of his NBA career with the same team for whom he played the first game of his NBA career.

In those 7 NBA contests Murray averaged in 5.0 MPG, 0.1 APG, 1.1 PPG and 0.7 RPG.

Then on October 4, 2004, he signed as a free agent with the New York Knicks, where he hoped he could continue playing in the National Basketball Association. However, on October 27, 2004, he was waived by New York and has not seen game action in the NBA since.

=== Panathinaikos Athens, P.A.O.K., Élan Chalon ===
In 2004, he signed with former European Champions Panathinaikos. He played there for one season and then he was transferred to P.A.O.K. BC where he played for another year. He left P.A.O.K. in January 2006. He retired from the NBA in 2004, proceeding to play the 2004–05 season in Greece with Panathinaikos. Then he played the following season with P.A.O.K. also of Greece. Played one more year in Élan Chalon in Chalon-sur-Saône, France.

The year 2006–07 was his final season of professional basketball. "I have a (22-month-old) son of my own and it's time to concentrate on him and my family", said Murray. "For the last 15 years, I haven't been able to spend time with them. My parents spend the whole year preparing for one week ...Fifteen years is a long time; it was a good run. We all sat down and talked about it and decided this was the last year. It takes a lot out of me. None of us are getting any younger. It's time to do some family stuff."

== NBA career statistics ==
Legend
GP	Games played	GS	Games started	MPG	Minutes per game
FG%	Field goal percentage	3P%	3-point field goal percentage	FT%	Free throw percentage
RPG	Rebounds per game	APG	Assists per game	SPG	Steals per game
BPG	Blocks per game	PPG	Points per game	**Bold**	Career high
†	Won an NBA championship	*	Led the league

=== Regular season ===
Year	Team	GP	GS	MPG	FG%	3P%	FT%	RPG	APG	SPG	BPG	PPG
1992–93	Portland	48	14	10.3	.415	.300	.875	1.7	.2	.2	.1	5.7
1993–94	Portland	66	1	12.4	**.470**	**.459***	.694	1.7	.5	.3	.3	6.6
1994–95	Portland	29	3	10.8	.412	.390	.824	1.3	.5	.2	.0	5.9
1994–95†	Houston	25	0	8.1	.400	.422	.625	.9	.2	.3	.1	3.5
1995–96	Toronto	**82**	**37**	**30.0**	.454	.422	.831	**4.3**	**1.6**	**1.1**	**.5**	**16.2**
1996–97	Washington	**82**	1	22.2	.425	.353	.839	3.1	1.0	.8	.2	10.0
1997–98	Washington	**82***	12	27.2	.446	.392	.871	3.4	1.0	.8	.3	15.1
1998–99	Washington	36	0	18.1	.350	.320	.810	2.3	.8	.6	.2	6.5
1999–00	Washington	80	8	22.9	.433	.430	.851	3.4	.9	.6	.3	10.2
2000–01	Denver	13	0	10.4	.309	.304	**.900**	1.7	.7	.3	.1	3.8
2000–01	Toronto	38	1	11.9	.399	.363	.750	1.6	.4	.2	.2	5.4
2001–02	Toronto	40	3	11.8	.411	.385	.810	1.3	.5	.3	.2	5.7
2002–03	L.A. Lakers	31	0	6.1	.324	.211	.778	.7	.4	.2	.1	2.0
2003–04	Portland	7	0	5.0	.250	.400	.000	.7	.1	.1	.0	1.1
Career		659	80	18.4	.430	.388	.829	2.5	.8	.5	.2	9.0

=== Playoffs ===
Year	Team	GP	GS	MPG	FG%	3P%	FT%	RPG	APG	SPG	BPG	PPG
1994	Portland	2	0	5.5	.500	.000	–	1.5	.5	.5	.0	3.0
1997	Washington	**3**	0	**29.0**	**.567**	**.500**	.941	**3.0**	**.7**	**1.3**	**.2**	**18.3**
2001	Toronto	2	0	2.5	.333	.000	–	.0	.0	.5	.0	1.0
Career		7	0	14.7	.538	.385	.941	1.7	.4	.9	.3	9.0

== Coaching career ==
After expressing an interest in coaching at the collegiate level, Murray served three years (2007–2009) as an assistant coach and player mentor for the Bakersfield Jam of the NBA Development League and one year (2011) as an assistant coach for the Tulsa Shock of the Women's National Basketball Association (WNBA).

On October 15, 2015, Murray was hired by the Los Angeles Lakers as an assistant coach/shooting coach. Head coach Byron Scott describes Murray as "one of the purest shooters I’ve ever seen."

== Personal life ==
Tracy Murray grew up in Pasadena, California. He is a cousin of former Los Angeles Clippers small forward Lamond Murray and former New York Knicks shooting guard Allan Houston. Murray now helps in his brother's Prodigy Athletic Institute Program, an AAU program in California where he coaches young people to be student-athletes.
