= Acie Earl =

American basketball player (born 1970)

Personal information
- Born: June 23, 1970 (age 56) Peoria, Illinois, U.S.
- Listed height: 6 ft 10 in (2.08 m)
- Listed weight: 240 lb (109 kg)

Career information
- High school: Moline (Moline, Illinois)
- College: Iowa (1989–1993)
- NBA draft: 1993: 1st round, 19th overall pick
- Drafted by: Boston Celtics
- Playing career: 1993–2004
- Position: Power forward / center
- Number: 55

Career history

Playing
- 1993–1995: Boston Celtics
- 1995–1997: Toronto Raptors
- 1997: Milwaukee Bucks
- 1997–1998: La Crosse Bobcats
- 1998: Paris Basket Racing
- 1998–1999: Sydney Kings
- 1999: Qianwei Aoshen
- 1999: Sydney Kings
- 1999–2000: Tuborg Pilsener
- 2000–2001: Türk Telekom
- 2001: Avtodor Saratov
- 2001–2002: UNICS Kazan
- 2002: Darüşşafaka
- 2003: Śląsk Wrocław
- 2003: Arkadia Traiskirchen Lions
- 2004: Budućnost Podgorica
- 2004: KB Dukagjini
- 2004: Waterloo Revolution

Coaching
- 2004–2005: Tijuana Dragons
- 2006–2007: Cleveland Magic

Career highlights
- All-NBL Third Team (1999); First-team All-Big Ten (1992); 2× Second-team All-Big Ten (1991, 1993); Big Ten Defensive Player of the Year (1992)

Career NBA statistics
- Points: 980 (5.1 ppg)
- Rebounds: 517 (2.7 rpg)
- Blocks: 126 (0.7 bpg)
- Stats at NBA.com
- Stats at Basketball Reference

Acie Boyd Earl (born June 23, 1970) is an American former professional basketball player, who appeared in four National Basketball Association (NBA) seasons, as a 6 ft 10 in (2.08 m), 240 lb (110 kg) center. He also played many seasons in Europe.

== High school/college ==
Born in Peoria, Illinois, Earl was a star basketball player from Moline High School playing varsity-level basketball for three seasons. He led the Maroons to a 23–4 record in 1988, along with future NFL All-Pro Brad Hopkins. Earl is currently the seventh leading all-time scorer in Moline basketball history.

Earl played college basketball at the University of Iowa, being a key recruit for Tom Davis' Hawkeyes. He appeared in 22 games in his first-year season, with an average of 6 points in 16 minutes, but still managed 50 blocked shots in limited playing time.

In his second season, Earl became a key force in the Big Ten Conference, averaging 16.3 points and 6.7 rebounds per game, with 106 total blocked shots. Iowa made it to the 1991 NCAA Tournament, where they were defeated by eventual champions Duke Blue Devils in the second round.

In his junior year, Earl slightly improved his numbers (managing to block an average of four shots a game), while the college made it to the 1992 NCAA Tournament, only to lose, again in the second round and against Duke (also the eventual winners), 75–62, with Earl blocking eight shot attempts, one shy of the all-time tournament record held by David Robinson.

With Earl still putting up strong numbers in 1992–93, Iowa again lost in the second round of the NCAA Tournament, this time to Wake Forest.

Earl graduated as the 1992 Big Ten Defensive Player of the Year, and upon graduation held the Iowa career record with 358 blocked shots, and was second in total points scored with 1779 (after Roy Marble). He received his undergraduate degree in the fall of 1992 with a degree in Leisure studies.

Earl now lives near his alma mater, in Iowa City.

== Professional career ==
Earl was selected in the first round of the 1993 NBA draft by the Boston Celtics with the 19th pick, in a year which included Chris Webber, Jamal Mashburn and Penny Hardaway. He played 74 games in his rookie season, averaging 5.5 points and 3.3 rebounds per game.

Earl's statistics declined in his second year, as he played in only 30 games, and was subsequently selected by the Toronto Raptors in the 1995 NBA expansion draft after the Celtics left him unprotected. With the Raptors, he posted his best statistical season, scoring 7.5 points per game, adding 3.1 rebounds. On April 12, 1996, against the team that drafted him—the Celtics—Earl posted a double-double, with 40 points and 12 rebounds in a 136–108 loss. Midway through 1996–97, he was traded to the Milwaukee Bucks, appearing in nine games in his final NBA season.

Subsequently, Earl took his game overseas, first appearing for Paris Basket Racing (France), also playing 21 games in Australia for the National Basketball League's Sydney Kings in 1998–99. In 1998, he also played with the CBA's La Crosse Bobcats.

Earl then represented Türk Telekom Ankara and Darussafaka Istanbul Spor Kulubu (Turkey), Unics Kazan and Saratov Autodor (Russia), Śląsk Wrocław (Poland), Traiskirchen Arkadia Lions (Austria) and KK Budućnost Podgorica (Montenegro), retiring in 2004. He also had a small stint for KB Peja, in Kosovo, helping the team become state champions.

Moving into coaching, Earl managed, during 2005, the Tijuana Dragons, an American Basketball Association (ABA) team based in Tijuana, Mexico.

== NBA career statistics ==
Legend
GP	Games played	GS	Games started	MPG	Minutes per game
FG%	Field goal percentage	3P%	3-point field goal percentage	FT%	Free throw percentage
RPG	Rebounds per game	APG	Assists per game	SPG	Steals per game
BPG	Blocks per game	PPG	Points per game	**Bold**	Career high

=== Regular season ===
Year	Team	GP	GS	MPG	FG%	3P%	FT%	RPG	APG	SPG	BPG	PPG
1993–94	Boston	**74**	**8**	15.5	.406	.000	.675	**3.3**	0.2	0.3	0.7	5.5
1994–95	Boston	30	3	6.9	.382	.000	.483	1.5	0.1	0.2	0.3	2.2
1995–96	Toronto	42	7	**15.6**	**.424**	.000	**.719**	3.1	**0.6**	**0.4**	**0.9**	**7.5**
1996–97	Toronto	38	0	12.0	.376	.000	.629	2.2	0.5	0.3	0.7	4.3
1996–97	Milwaukee	9	0	4.8	.348	.000	.714	1.2	0.2	0.3	0.1	2.9
Career		193	18	13.0	.403	.000	.667	2.7	0.3	0.3	0.7	5.1

=== Playoffs ===
Year	Team	GP	GS	MPG	FG%	3P%	FT%	RPG	APG	SPG	BPG	PPG
1994–95	Boston	1	0	10.0	.333	.000	.000	2.0	0.0	0.0	1.0	2.0
