= Dan O'Sullivan (basketball) =

American basketball player (born 1968)

Personal information
- Born: March 3, 1968 (age 58) The Bronx, New York, U.S.
- Listed height: 6 ft 10 in (2.08 m)
- Listed weight: 250 lb (113 kg)

Career information
- High school: Bayonne (Bayonne, New Jersey)
- College: Fordham (1986–1990)
- NBA draft: 1990: undrafted
- Playing career: 1990–2000
- Position: Center
- Number: 45, 54, 53, 52

Career history
- 1990: Omaha Racers
- 1990–1991: Utah Jazz
- 1991–1992: Louisville Shooters
- 1992: New Jersey Jammers
- 1992–1993: New Jersey Nets
- 1993: Milwaukee Bucks
- 1993: Gallitos de Isabela
- 1993–1994: Detroit Pistons
- 1994–1995: Rapid City Thrillers
- 1995: Jersey Turnpikes
- 1995: Jackson Jackals
- 1995: TAU Cerámica
- 1995–1995: Shreveport Storm
- 1996: Toronto Raptors
- 1996: Pesaro
- 1997–1998: Fortitudo Bologna
- 1998–1999: Virtus Bologna
- 1999–2000: AEK Athens
- Stats at NBA.com
- Stats at Basketball Reference

Daniel James O'Sullivan (born March 3, 1968) is an American former professional basketball player.

A 6′10″ (2.08 m), 250 lb (114 kg) center born in The Bronx, New York, O'Sullivan attended Fordham University. He played with the Omaha Racers of the Continental Basketball Association, and from the 1990–91 NBA season until 1996, he played with five different NBA teams: Utah Jazz (1990–91), New Jersey Nets (1992–93), Milwaukee Bucks (1992–93), Detroit Pistons (1993–94) and Toronto Raptors (1995–96). He has played for Washington Bullets during the 1993 pre-season (but not in the regular season). He also played with Kinder Bologna, Teamsystem Bologna and Scavolini in the Italian league, and also in Greece for AEK (1999–2000).

== Career statistics ==
Legend
GP	Games played	GS	Games started	MPG	Minutes per game
FG%	Field goal percentage	3P%	3-point field goal percentage	FT%	Free throw percentage
RPG	Rebounds per game	APG	Assists per game	SPG	Steals per game
BPG	Blocks per game	PPG	Points per game	**Bold**	Career high

=== NBA ===
Year	Team	GP	GS	MPG	FG%	3P%	FT%	RPG	APG	SPG	BPG	PPG
1990–91	Utah	**21**	0	4.0	.438	.000	.636	0.8	0.2	0.0	0.0	1.0
1992–93	New Jersey	3	0	3.3	**.667**	.000	.000	1.3	0.0	0.0	0.0	1.3
1992–93	Milwaukee	3	0	2.3	.500	.000	.750	0.7	0.3	0.3	0.0	1.7
1993–94	Detroit	13	0	4.3	.333	.000	.750	0.8	0.2	0.0	0.0	1.3
1995–96	Toronto	5	**2**	**27.8**	.371	.000	**.875**	**6.4**	**0.4**	**0.4**	**0.8**	**6.6**
Career		45	2	6.6	.397	.000	.743	1.4	0.2	0.1	0.1	1.8

=== College ===
Year	Team	GP	GS	MPG	FG%	3P%	FT%	RPG	APG	SPG	BPG	PPG
1986–87	Fordham	18	-	6.2	.524	-	.462	1.4	0.1	-	-	1.6
1987–88	Fordham	**33**	-	28.5	**.568**	-	.667	5.8	0.7	-	-	9.8
1988–89	Fordham	29	-	30.9	.454	.000	**.686**	7.4	1.4	-	-	10.8
1989–90	Fordham	**33**	-	**32.2**	.489	.000	.578	**7.5**	**2.0**	-	-	**12.5**
Career		113	-	26.6	.501	.000	.634	6.0	1.2	-	-	9.5
