= Dwayne Whitfield =

American basketball player

Personal information
- Born: August 22, 1971 (age 54) Aberdeen, Mississippi, U.S.
- Listed height: 6 ft 9 in (2.06 m)
- Listed weight: 240 lb (109 kg)

Career information
- High school: Aberdeen (Aberdeen, Mississippi)
- College: Jackson State (1992–1995)
- NBA draft: 1995: 2nd round, 40th overall pick
- Drafted by: Golden State Warriors
- Position: Power forward
- Number: 23

Career history
- 1996: Toronto Raptors
- Stats at NBA.com
- Stats at Basketball Reference

Dwayne Whitfield (born August 22, 1972) is an American former professional basketball player. A 6'9" and 240 lb power forward, he played college basketball for the Jackson State Tigers and had a brief stint in the National Basketball Association (NBA) with the Toronto Raptors.

Whitfield was selected 40th overall by the Golden State Warriors in the 1995 NBA draft. He played 8 games in the inaugural season for the Toronto Raptors in early 1996 after he was acquired in a multi-player trade for B. J. Armstrong. He also played professionally abroad in Italy, Spain, China, Hungary, Mexico, Venezuela and Chile. He also played with the Rockford Lightning of the CBA, The Brooklyn Kings of the USBL and The NBA Ambassadors under head coach Nate "Tiny" Archibald.
