= Oliver Miller =

American basketball player (1970-2025)

Oliver J. Miller
Personal information
- Born: April 6, 1970 Fort Worth, Texas, U.S.
- Died: March 12, 2025 (aged 54) Phoenix, Arizona, U.S.
- Listed height: 6 ft 9 in (2.06 m)
- Listed weight: 315 lb (143 kg)

Career information
- High school: Southwest (Fort Worth, Texas)
- College: Arkansas (1988–1992)
- NBA draft: 1992: 1st round, 22nd overall pick
- Drafted by: Phoenix Suns
- Playing career: 1992–2010
- Position: Center
- Number: 25, 30, 2, 8, 3, 48

Career history
- 1992–1994: Phoenix Suns
- 1994–1995: Detroit Pistons
- 1995–1996: Toronto Raptors
- 1996–1997: Dallas Mavericks
- 1997–1998: Toronto Raptors
- 1998–1999: Iraklio
- 1999: Sacramento Kings
- 1999–2000: Phoenix Suns
- 2000–2001: Znicz Pruszków
- 2002: Southern California Surf
- 2002: Gary Steelheads
- 2002: Dodge City Legend
- 2002–2003: Gary Steelheads
- 2003: Dakota Wizards
- 2003: Indios de Mayagüez
- 2003: Fujian Xunxing
- 2003–2004: Minnesota Timberwolves
- 2004: Dakota Wizards
- 2004–2005: Texas Tycoons
- 2005: Arkansas RimRockers
- 2006–2007: Arkansas Rivercatz
- 2010: Lawton-Fort Sill Cavalry

Career highlights
- CBA All-Star (2003); All-CBA Second Team (2003); CBA blocks leader (2003); SWC Player of the Year (1991); First-team All-SWC (1991)

Career NBA statistics
- Points: 3,625 (7.4 ppg)
- Rebounds: 2,893 (5.9 rpg)
- Blocks: 758 (1.5 bpg)
- Stats at NBA.com
- Stats at Basketball Reference

Oliver J. Miller (April 6, 1970 – March 12, 2025) was an American professional basketball player in the National Basketball Association (NBA). He was nicknamed "the Big O" because of his large size (6 ft 9 in (2.06 m) and sometimes over 300 lb (136 kg)). Miller played college basketball for the Arkansas Razorbacks and was selected by the Phoenix Suns in the 1992 NBA draft. After his initial stint in the NBA from 1992 to 1998, Miller played overseas and for semi-professional American teams. He returned to the NBA for the 2003–04 season, but later transitioned back to minor-league and semi-professional play. Miller's basketball career ended in 2010.

== Background ==
Oliver Miller was born on April 6, 1970, in Fort Worth, Texas, where he was raised and attended Southwest High School. He was a star athlete.

== College career ==
Miller was one of the top high school basketball players in the nation as a senior, and he signed with the University of Arkansas and played for its Razorbacks basketball team under head coach Nolan Richardson. Miller played for teams that won the Southwest Conference regular season championship and the SWC Tournament championship three consecutive years from 1989 to 1991. The 1990 Arkansas team also made it to the Final Four. Miller was named the SWC Player of the Year by league coaches, and was the SWC Tournament MVP, in 1991. His senior season, Arkansas moved to the Southeastern Conference, and Miller helped the team win the SEC West Division championship and the SEC overall regular season title in their inaugural year in the conference. During his four years at Arkansas, the Razorbacks posted a record of 115-24. Miller still holds the school record for career blocked shots and highest scoring percentage. He graduated from the university in 1992. Miller is considered one of the best players in school history.

== Career ==
Miller was selected by the Phoenix Suns with the 22nd overall pick of the 1992 NBA draft. He played for six NBA teams during his career, including the Suns (1992–94, 1999–2000), the Detroit Pistons (1994–95), the Toronto Raptors (1995–96 and 1997–98), the Dallas Mavericks (1996–97), the Sacramento Kings (1998–99), and the Minnesota Timberwolves (2003–04). He was signed by the Indiana Pacers during the 2002 preseason, but was waived before the regular season began.

Miller was a member of the 1993 Phoenix Suns team that reached the NBA Finals.

Chosen by the Toronto Raptors in the 1995 expansion draft, Miller played for the Raptors during the franchise's first NBA season (1995-96). Statistically, this season was Miller's best NBA season; he averaged 12.9 points and 7.4 rebounds per game.

Miller was known as a talented center with good passing skills. However, he was also notorious for his weight problems. He fluctuated from 270 lb (120 kg) to 380 lb (170 kg) during his career.

Following his initial stint in the NBA, Miller moved overseas, joining Iraklio BC in Greece for the 1998–99 season. However, in February 1999, he signed with the Kings to play in four games. He spent the next season back with the Suns, playing in 51 games. After the season, Miller became a bit of a basketball vagabond, joining the Harlem Globetrotters for the first of two stints with the team, then Pruszkow in Poland and back to the Globetrotters. In December 2001, after another brief term with the Globetrotters, Miller was released for showing "no appreciation for what it takes mentally and physically to be a Harlem Globetrotter." In January 2002 he signed with the Roseto Sharks in Italy, but he did not play there. He then joined the Continental Basketball Association with the Gary Steelheads in Gary, Indiana, before moving to the competing American Basketball Association's Southern California Surf and the USBL's Dodge City Legend. He returned to the Steelheads in October 2002, and was traded to the Dakota Wizards in February 2003. He earned All-CBA Second Team honors with the Wizards at the end of the 2002–03 season.

In the 2003–04 season, Miller made a comeback with the Minnesota Timberwolves. Despite being listed at 315 lb (143 kg), he was still able to play an average of 10 minutes a game off the bench in his last NBA season. After a stint in Puerto Rico, Miller returned to the Wizards in October 2004 and next played with the Texas Tycoons in the ABA until February 2005. He then played in 2005 for the Arkansas RimRockers in the ABA. Miller was next signed to the Lawton-Fort Sill Cavalry of the Premier Basketball League on March 15, 2010, but he was released in December.

=== Career after athletics ===
Miller reportedly relocated to Mesa, Arizona in August 2012 and was a car salesman, working for former basketball player Alvin Heggs. He has also spent time participating in basketball camps.

== Honors and awards ==
Miller was inducted into the University of Arkansas Sports Hall of Honor in September 2016 and was selected as an SEC Basketball Legend in January 2017.

In 2024, Miller was elected to the Southwest Conference Hall of Fame.

== Legal troubles ==
In April 2011, Miller was accused of pistol-whipping a man during an altercation at a barbecue cookout in Arnold, Maryland. He was arrested and charged with first- and second-degree assault, reckless endangerment, possessing a handgun, using a handgun in a violent crime, possessing a handgun in a vehicle and disorderly conduct, among other charges. On November 1, 2011, Miller pleaded guilty in Anne Arundel County to first-degree assault and possessing a handgun. He was sentenced on February 3, 2012, to a year in the Anne Arundel County jail (a five-year sentence with four years suspended), followed by five years of probation.

== Personal life ==
Miller had two sons and a daughter. In September 2020, Miller was reported to be retired and living in Phoenix, with a claimed weight of 278 lb (126 kg), spending his time participating in basketball camps and playing with his grandchildren.

Miller died from cancer in Phoenix on March 12, 2025, at the age of 54.

== NBA career statistics ==
Legend
GP	Games played	GS	Games started	MPG	Minutes per game
FG%	Field goal percentage	3P%	3-point field goal percentage	FT%	Free throw percentage
RPG	Rebounds per game	APG	Assists per game	SPG	Steals per game
BPG	Blocks per game	PPG	Points per game	**Bold**	Career high
*	Led the league

=== Regular season ===
Year	Team	GP	GS	MPG	FG%	3P%	FT%	RPG	APG	SPG	BPG	PPG
1992–93	Phoenix	56	1	19.1	.475	.000	.710	4.9	2.1	.7	1.8	5.6
1993–94	Phoenix	69	30	25.9	**.609**	.222	.584	6.9	**3.5**	1.2	**2.3**	9.2
1994–95	Detroit	64	22	24.3	.555	**.231**	.629	**7.4**	1.5	.9	1.8	8.5
1995–96	Toronto	**76**	**72**	**33.1**	.526	.000	.661	7.4	2.9	**1.4**	1.9	**12.9**
1996–97	Dallas	42	0	19.9	.494	.000	.528	5.5	1.4	.8	1.2	4.3
1996–97	Toronto	19	8	16.6	.560	.000	**.769**	3.8	1.5	.7	.7	6.0
1997–98	Toronto	64	53	25.4	.461	.000	.604	6.3	3.1	.9	1.1	6.3
1998–99	Sacramento	4	0	8.8	.455	—	—	2.0	.0	.0	.5	2.5
1999–00	Phoenix	51	9	21.3	.588	—	.671	5.1	1.3	.8	1.6	6.3
2003–04	Minnesota	48	1	10.5	.530	.000	.652	2.7	.8	.4	.5	2.5
Career		493	196	23.0	.534	.116	.639	5.9	2.2	.9	1.5	7.4

=== Playoffs ===
Year	Team	GP	GS	MPG	FG%	3P%	FT%	RPG	APG	SPG	BPG	PPG
1993	Phoenix	**24***	0	**21.4**	.587	.000	**.564**	**5.2**	**2.1**	**.9**	**2.5**	**7.2**
1994	Phoenix	10	**4**	14.6	**.593**	—	.429	4.4	1.3	.6	1.2	3.5
2000	Phoenix	7	0	5.3	.222	.000	.500	1.1	.1	.0	.3	.9
2004	Minnesota	8	0	3.9	.250	—	.500	.6	.1	.0	.4	.4
Career		49	4	14.8	.559	.000	.544	3.7	1.3	.6	1.6	4.4
