= Tony Massenburg =

American basketball player (born 1967)

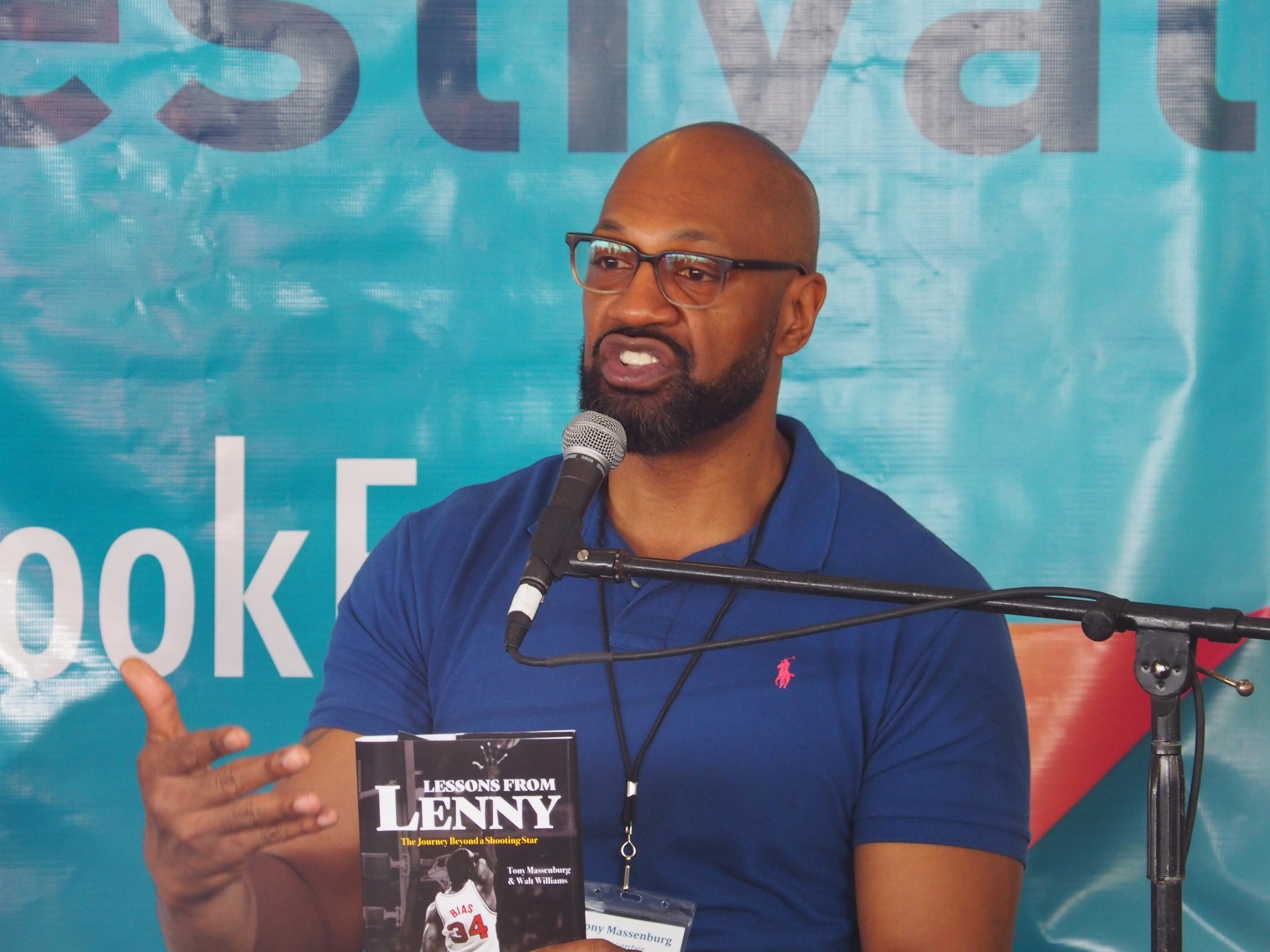

Personal information
- Born: July 31, 1967 (age 59) Sussex, Virginia, U.S.
- Listed height: 6 ft 9 in (2.06 m)
- Listed weight: 250 lb (113 kg)

Career information
- High school: Sussex Central (Sussex, Virginia)
- College: Maryland (1986–1990)
- NBA draft: 1990: 2nd round, 43rd overall pick
- Drafted by: San Antonio Spurs
- Playing career: 1990–2008
- Position: Power forward / center
- Number: 45, 32, 41, 9, 30, 44, 34

Career history
- 1990–1991: San Antonio Spurs
- 1991–1992: Charlotte Hornets
- 1992: Boston Celtics
- 1992: Golden State Warriors
- 1992: Pallacanestro Reggiana
- 1992–1993: Unicaja Málaga
- 1993–1994: Barcelona
- 1994–1995: Los Angeles Clippers
- 1995–1996: Toronto Raptors
- 1996: Philadelphia 76ers
- 1996–1997: New Jersey Nets
- 1997–1999: Vancouver Grizzlies
- 1999: Houston Rockets
- 1999–2002: Vancouver / Memphis Grizzlies
- 2002–2003: Utah Jazz
- 2003–2004: Sacramento Kings
- 2004–2005: San Antonio Spurs
- 2008: Capitanes de Arecibo

Career highlights
- NBA champion (2005); Second-team All-ACC (1990)
- Stats at NBA.com
- Stats at Basketball Reference

Tony Arnel Massenburg (born July 31, 1967) is an American former professional basketball player. Massenburg was on the active roster of 12 different teams, which was an NBA record shared with Joe Smith, Jim Jackson, Chucky Brown, and Ish Smith; until Ish played with the Denver Nuggets, his 13th team, in the 2022–23 season. In 2005, while on the San Antonio Spurs, Massenburg became the first player in NBA history to win a championship after playing for at least 12 different franchises.

== College career ==
Massenburg played in college for the University of Maryland from 1986 to 1990, playing under three different head coaches: Lefty Driesell, Bob Wade, and Gary Williams. He had a career field goal shooting percentage of 52.3% and averaged 12.1 points per game in his four-year career with the Terrapins. In his senior season, in which he was featured on the cover of the team's handbook on an aircraft carrier, he averaged 18 points and 10.1 rebounds per game. He was one of only two players in the Atlantic Coast Conference to average double figures in both categories that season. His efforts in his senior season earned him a spot on the All-ACC Second Team.

== Professional career ==
=== Early career and move to Italy (1990–1991) ===
Massenburg was selected with the 43rd pick in the second round of the 1990 NBA draft by the San Antonio Spurs. During his first stint with the Spurs, he was able to play alongside NBA legend David Robinson. He played in 35 games with the Spurs during the 1990–91 NBA season.

As part of his first career NBA injury's rehabilitation program, Massenburg went to the Italian League in 1991, where he averaged almost 23 points and 10 rebounds per game in four games with the Italian club Pallacanestro Reggiana.

=== Return to NBA (1991–1992) ===
Massenburg returned to the NBA and his former team the Spurs, however he only played one game for the franchise as he was waived on November 2, 1991, in the beginning of the 1991–1992 season.

On December 11, 1991, Massenburg signed with the Charlotte Hornets where he played for three games before being waived again on January 7, 1992.

On January 10, 1992, Massenburg signed a 10-day contract with the Boston Celtics for seven games.

On February 13, 1992, he signed another 10-day contract with the Golden State Warriors for another seven games; ending his season with a total of 18 games and 90 minutes played with four franchises that season.

=== Move to Spain (1992–1994) ===
Massenburg played in the Spanish League with Unicaja-Mayoral for the 1992–1993 season.

He also played for another Spanish team FC Barcelona during the 1993–94 season. He won both the Spanish King's Cup championship and the Catalan League championship with Barcelona in 1994.

=== Second return to NBA (1994–2004) ===
Massenburg returned to the NBA again in the 1994 offseason when he was signed by the Los Angeles Clippers on June 27, 1994. Massenburg came just short of playing an entire NBA season for the first time in his career during the 1994–95 season for 80 games. Massenburg was taken in the NBA expansion draft in 1995 by the Toronto Raptors. After 24 games there, he was shipped to the Philadelphia 76ers, where he played 30 games.

During the 1996–97 season, Massenburg once again came very close to playing an entire NBA season, seeing action in 79 games with yet another team, the New Jersey Nets. Massenburg returned to Canada for the 1997–98 season, playing with the Brian Winters-coached Vancouver Grizzlies. In Vancouver, Massenburg backed up center Bryant Reeves. He played two seasons in Vancouver before being traded before the 1999–2000 season to the Houston Rockets. With the Rockets, he played in ten games, then was promptly returned to the Grizzlies before the 2000–2001 campaign. When the franchise relocated to Memphis in 2001, so did Massenburg. During the Grizzlies' first season on U.S. soil, Massenburg played in 73 games, averaging 5.5 points per game. In successive years, he was a member of the Utah Jazz and the Sacramento Kings.

=== NBA championship and retirement ===
Massenburg returned to the Spurs for the 2004–05 season and with them he won an NBA championship ring that year, when the Spurs defeated the Detroit Pistons four games to three in the 2005 NBA Finals. During the series Massenburg mainly observed from the bench as his teammates clinched the Spurs' third NBA title in seven years. However, six weeks after the finals ended, a late-night auto accident badly damaged Massenburg's ankle, leaving him unable to play the following two seasons.

After being out with the ankle injury for two seasons, Massenburg attempted an NBA comeback in the year 2007 with the Washington Wizards, but he was waived by the team before the season started. He then signed with the Arecibo Captains, a Puerto Rican team, but was released shortly after. In his NBA career, Massenburg participated in 683 NBA games over 15 seasons. He scored 4,238 points in his career for a career average of 6.2 points per game. He collected 2,964 rebounds in his career for a career average of 4.3 rebounds per game. He had 266 assists in his career, for a career average 0.4 assists per game.

== Later life ==
In 2010, Massenburg started a sports bar in the Kentlands area of Gaithersburg, Maryland, called 44 Sports Bar, which reflected Massenburg's jersey number.

In December 2013, Tony Massenburg's jersey number was retired at Sussex Central High School (VA), along with that of Reginald Givens (a former NFL linebacker). These two men were the only two athletes from the school ever to play a sport professionally.

Massenburg now contributes to CSN Mid-Atlantic's Washington Wizards coverage.

== Works ==
- Tony Massenburg, Walt Williams, Lessons from Lenny: The Journey Beyond a Shooting Star, Whyde Range Productions, 2018. ISBN 9780999532003

== NBA career statistics ==
Legend
GP	Games played	GS	Games started	MPG	Minutes per game
FG%	Field goal percentage	3P%	3-point field goal percentage	FT%	Free throw percentage
RPG	Rebounds per game	APG	Assists per game	SPG	Steals per game
BPG	Blocks per game	PPG	Points per game	**Bold**	Career high
†	Won an NBA championship

=== Regular season ===
Year	Team	GP	GS	MPG	FG%	3P%	FT%	RPG	APG	SPG	BPG	PPG
1990–91	San Antonio	35	0	4.6	.450	—	.622	1.7	.1	.1	.3	2.3
1991–92	San Antonio	1	0	9.0	.200	—	—	.0	.0	.0	.0	2.0
1991–92	Charlotte	3	0	4.3	.000	—	.500	1.3	.0	.3	.0	.3
1991–92	Boston	7	0	6.6	.444	—	.500	1.3	.0	.0	.1	1.4
1991–92	Golden State	7	0	3.1	**.625**	—	.667	1.7	.0	.0	.0	2.3
1994–95	L.A. Clippers	**80**	**50**	26.6	.469	.000	.753	5.7	**.8**	**.6**	.7	9.3
1995–96	Toronto	24	20	**27.5**	.510	—	.662	**6.9**	**.8**	.5	.4	10.1
1995–96	Philadelphia	30	8	26.8	.483	.000	.739	6.2	.4	.5	.4	9.9
1996–97	New Jersey	79	49	24.7	.485	.000	.631	6.5	.3	.5	.6	7.2
1997–98	Vancouver	61	13	14.7	.479	—	.730	3.8	.3	.4	.4	6.5
1998–99	Vancouver	43	35	26.6	.487	.000	.665	6.0	.5	**.6**	**.9**	**11.2**
1999–2000	Houston	10	0	10.9	.444	—	**.875**	2.7	.3	.2	.5	4.6
2000–01	Vancouver	52	20	15.8	.462	—	.700	4.0	.2	.2	.5	4.5
2001–02	Memphis	73	31	17.1	.456	**1.000**	.718	4.4	.4	.4	.4	5.5
2002–03	Utah	58	1	13.7	.448	—	.774	2.7	.3	.3	.3	4.7
2003–04	Sacramento	59	0	13.4	.475	.000	.683	3.2	.5	.2	.3	4.3
2004–05†	San Antonio	61	6	11.5	.407	—	.762	2.7	.2	.3	.3	3.2
Career		683	233	18.0	.470	.091	.705	4.3	.4	.4	.5	6.2

=== Playoffs ===
Year	Team	GP	GS	MPG	FG%	3P%	FT%	RPG	APG	SPG	BPG	PPG
1991	San Antonio	1	0	1.0	—	—	—	.0	.0	.0	.0	.0
2003	Utah	5	0	**14.0**	**.476**	—	**.556**	**4.2**	**.4**	.0	**.8**	**5.0**
2005†	San Antonio	**9**	0	3.1	.167	—	.500	1.2	.0	.0	.0	.3
Career		15	0	6.6	.407	—	.545	2.1	.1	.0	.3	1.9
