= Brendan Malone =

American basketball coach (1935–2023)

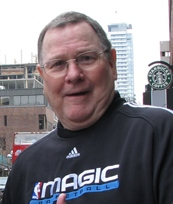
- Malone in 2008 as Orlando Magic assistant coach

Personal information
- Born: April 21, 1935 New York City, New York, U.S.
- Died: October 10, 2023 (aged 88)

Career information
- High school: Rice (Harlem, New York)
- College: Iona (1958–1962)
- Coaching career: 1967–2016

Career history

Coaching
- 1967–1970: Power Memorial Academy (JV)
- 1970–1976: Power Memorial Academy
- 1976–1977: Fordham (assistant)
- 1977–1978: Yale (assistant)
- 1978–1984: Syracuse (assistant)
- 1984–1986: Rhode Island
- 1986–1988: New York Knicks (assistant)
- 1988–1995: Detroit Pistons (assistant)
- 1995–1996: Toronto Raptors
- 1996–2000: New York Knicks (assistant)
- 2000–2003: Indiana Pacers (assistant)
- 2003–2004: New York Knicks (assistant)
- 2004–2005: Cleveland Cavaliers (assistant)
- 2005: Cleveland Cavaliers (interim)
- 2007–2012: Orlando Magic (assistant)
- 2014–2016: Detroit Pistons (assistant)

Career highlights
- As assistant coach: 2× NBA champion (1989, 1990); Big East tournament champion (1981)

Career coaching record
- NBA: 29–71 (.290)
- Record at Basketball Reference

Brendan Thomas Malone (April 21, 1935 – October 10, 2023) was an American professional basketball coach in the National Basketball Association (NBA).

== Early life ==
Brendan Thomas Malone was born on April 21, 1935. He grew up in Astoria, Queens in New York City and graduated from Rice High School. Malone's father, also named Brendan, unloaded freight cars for the Railway Express Agency. Malone then attended Iona College. He played only one game in 1960 for the Iona Gaels men's basketball team and graduated with a bachelor's degree in 1962.

He was the father of former Denver Nuggets head coach Michael Malone.

== Coaching career ==
After graduating from Iona, Malone then became a Catholic Youth Organization basketball coach for the Church of the Most Precious Blood in Astoria, Queens, then became junior varsity basketball coach at Power Memorial Academy in 1967. Malone also enrolled at New York University and graduated with a master's degree in physical education in 1968. From 1970 to 1976, Malone was varsity basketball coach at Power Memorial and led Power Memorial to two city championships. During his six-season stint, Malone earned three "Coach of the Year" honors.

Malone was named an assistant coach at Fordham on April 5, 1976. He also served in a similar capacity at the collegiate level with Yale (1977–1978), and Syracuse (1978–1984 under Jim Boeheim) before becoming head coach at Rhode Island from 1984 to 1986.

Malone then got his first NBA coaching job as an assistant for the New York Knicks in 1986 and served two seasons in the staffs of head coaches Hubie Brown, Bob Hill, and Rick Pitino. In 1988, Malone joined the Detroit Pistons as an assistant coach under Chuck Daly. Malone stayed in Detroit until 1995 and also coached under Ron Rothstein in the 1992–93 season and Don Chaney from 1993 to 1995. Malone helped coach the Pistons to the 1989 and 1990 NBA championship titles.

Malone was named as the first head coach (1995–96) of the Toronto Raptors, one of two 1995 NBA expansion teams in Canada. Malone was appointed the job by the Raptors' general manager of the time, Isiah Thomas. Malone was long considered the NBA's leading authority on defending Michael Jordan, particularly after orchestrating Detroit Piston defenses that kept Jordan's Bulls out of the NBA Finals for some time. Malone only lasted one season as head coach of the Raptors, going 21–61, but handed the championship Bulls one of their few losses that season. Following his time with the Raptors, Malone served as an assistant coach with the Indiana Pacers, New York Knicks, Detroit Pistons and as a consultant with the Seattle SuperSonics. He was the interim head coach of the Cleveland Cavaliers in 2004–05.

On July 3, 2007, Malone was one of four assistants hired to serve under new Orlando Magic head coach Stan Van Gundy. On June 25, 2013, he was hired as an assistant coach for the Sacramento Kings, under new head coach Michael Malone, his son, who himself was hired earlier that month. However, on October 23, 2013, his resignation was announced, with the "rigors of coaching in the NBA" cited as the reason. On May 30, 2014, Malone was one of three assistants hired to serve under new Detroit Pistons head coach Stan Van Gundy. On June 15, 2016, Malone became a scout in the New York region for the Pistons, giving up his assistant job in the process.

== Death ==
Brendan Malone died on October 10, 2023, at the age of 88.

== Head coaching record ==
=== College ===
Record table
Season	Team	Overall	Conference	Standing	Postseason
Rhode Island Rams (Atlantic 10 Conference) (1984–1986)
1984–85	Rhode Island	8–20	2–16	10th	
1985–86	Rhode Island	9–19	5–13	T–8th	
Rhode Island:		17–39	7–29		
Total:		17–39			

=== NBA ===
Legend
Regular season	G	Games coached	W	Games won	L	Games lost	W–L %	Win–loss %
Playoffs	PG	Playoff games	PW	Playoff wins	PL	Playoff losses	PW–L %	Playoff win–loss %

Team	Year	G	W	L	W–L%	Finish	PG	PW	PL	PW–L%	Result
Toronto	1995–96	82	21	61	.256	8th in Central	—	—	—	—	Missed Playoffs
Cleveland	2004–05	18	8	10	.444	4th in Central	—	—	—	—	Missed Playoffs
Career		100	29	71	.290		—	—	—	—	
