= Willie Anderson (basketball) =

American basketball player (born 1966)

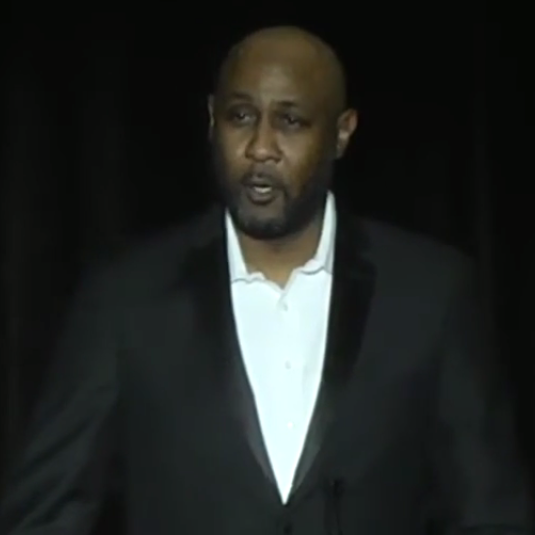
- Anderson at the Georgia Sports Hall of Fame in 2020

Personal information
- Born: January 8, 1967 (age 59) Greenville, South Carolina, U.S.
- Listed height: 6 ft 7 in (2.01 m)
- Listed weight: 190 lb (86 kg)

Career information
- High school: East Atlanta (Atlanta, Georgia)
- College: Georgia (1984–1988)
- NBA draft: 1988: 1st round, 10th overall pick
- Drafted by: San Antonio Spurs
- Playing career: 1988–1998
- Position: Small forward
- Number: 40, 35

Career history
- 1988–1995: San Antonio Spurs
- 1995–1996: Toronto Raptors
- 1996: New York Knicks
- 1996: Olympiacos
- 1997: Miami Heat
- 1997–1998: AEK Athens
- 1998: Maccabi Tel Aviv

Career highlights
- NBA All-Rookie First Team (1989); Greek League All-Star (1997); First-team All-SEC (1988)

Career NBA statistics
- Points: 6,771 (12.2 ppg)
- Rebounds: 2,082 (3.8 rpg)
- Assists: 2,105 (3.8 apg)
- Stats at NBA.com
- Stats at Basketball Reference
Medals
Men's basketball
Representing United States
Pan American Games
Silver medal – second place	1987 Indianapolis	Team competition
Olympic Games
Bronze medal – third place	1988 Seoul	Team competition

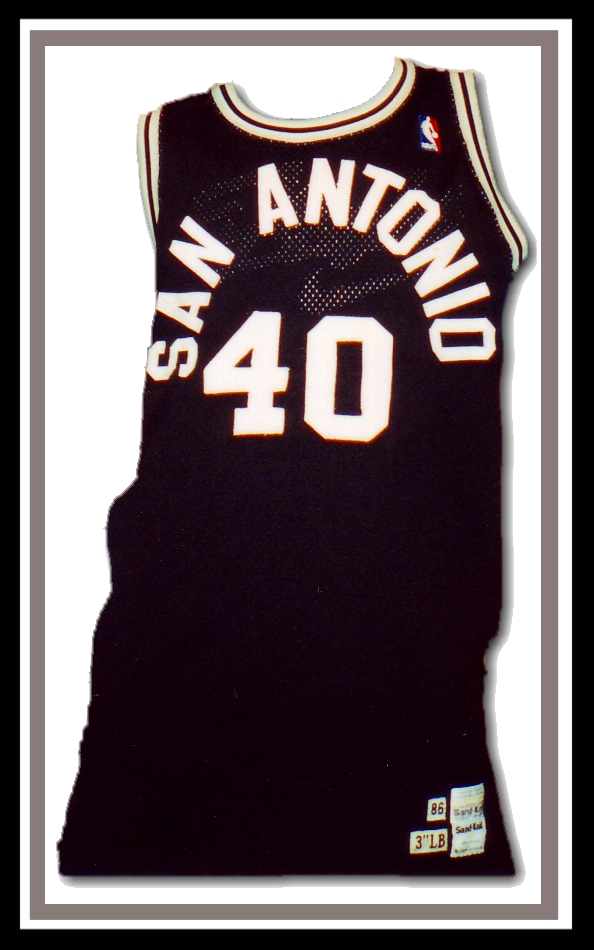
Anderson wore #40 for nearly his entire career, including his seven-season run with the Spurs.

Willie Lloyd Anderson Jr. (born January 8, 1967) is an American former professional basketball player. During his professional career, Anderson played nine seasons in the National Basketball Association (NBA) and three seasons in the EuroLeague. He was named to the 1988–89 NBA season's All-Rookie First Team. While he was a member of the Greek Basket League club AEK Athens, he played in the 1998 EuroLeague Final. Anderson won an Olympic bronze medal as a member of the United States national team in 1988.

== College career ==
After playing high school basketball at East Atlanta High, Anderson played college basketball at the University of Georgia, with the Georgia Bulldogs, from 1984 to 1988. In his junior season, Anderson averaged 15.9 points, 4.1 rebounds, 5.0 assists, 1.4 steals, and 1.6 blocks per game, in 30 games played. During his senior season, Anderson averaged 16.7 points, 5.1 rebounds, 4.0 assists, 1.9 steals, and 1.4 blocks per game, in 35 games played, and he was named to the SEC's All-Conference Team.

== Professional career ==
After attending and playing college basketball at the University of Georgia, Anderson was selected by the San Antonio Spurs, with the 10th overall pick of the 1988 NBA draft. Anderson was selected to the 1989 NBA All-Rookie Team. During the 1990 NBA Playoffs, Anderson averaged playoff-career-highs of 20.5 points, 5.4 rebounds, and 5.2 assists per game respectively. The Spurs advanced past the Denver Nuggets in the first round, before losing to the eventual Western Conference champion Portland Trail Blazers, in a hard-fought seven game playoff series.

Anderson played for the Spurs until the 1994–95 season. He spent 1995–96 season with the Toronto Raptors, after he was selected in the 1995 expansion draft. He also played with the New York Knicks that season. Anderson spent the 1996–97 season playing in Greece, where he played with the Greek Basket League club Olympiacos Piraeus, and with the NBA's Miami Heat.

He moved to the Greek club AEK Athens, for the 1997–98 season. He helped AEK make it to the EuroLeague's 1998 Final, which they lost to the Italian League club Virtus Bologna, by a score of 58–44. Anderson signed with the Israeli Super League club Maccabi Tel Aviv, for the 1998–99 season. However, he was waived by the club at the beginning of the season. After signing with the club, he declared that season would be his last season in professional basketball, and after he was waived by the club, he did in fact retire from playing pro club basketball.

== National team career ==
Anderson won a silver medal with Team USA at the 1987 Pan American Games. He also won a bronze medal at the 1988 Summer Olympics.

== Personal life ==
Anderson is the older brother of former NBA player Shandon Anderson, and the father of former University of Tennessee at Chattanooga Lady Mocs player Alex Anderson.

== NBA career statistics ==
Legend
GP	Games played	GS	Games started	MPG	Minutes per game
FG%	Field goal percentage	3P%	3-point field goal percentage	FT%	Free throw percentage
RPG	Rebounds per game	APG	Assists per game	SPG	Steals per game
BPG	Blocks per game	PPG	Points per game	**Bold**	Career high

=== Regular season ===
Year	Team	GP	GS	MPG	FG%	3P%	FT%	RPG	APG	SPG	BPG	PPG
1988–89	San Antonio	81	79	33.8	**.498**	.190	.775	5.1	4.6	**1.9**	0.8	**18.6**
1989–90	San Antonio	**82**	**81**	34.0	.492	.269	.748	4.5	4.4	1.4	0.7	15.7
1990–91	San Antonio	75	75	**34.6**	.457	.200	.798	4.7	4.8	1.1	0.8	14.4
1991–92	San Antonio	57	55	33.1	.455	.232	.775	**5.3**	**5.3**	0.9	0.9	13.1
1992–93	San Antonio	38	7	14.7	.430	.125	.786	1.5	2.1	0.4	0.2	4.8
1993–94	San Antonio	80	79	31.1	.471	.324	.848	3.0	4.3	0.9	0.6	11.9
1994–95	San Antonio	38	11	14.6	.469	.158	.732	1.4	1.4	0.7	0.3	4.9
1995–96	Toronto	49	42	31.9	.440	.305	**.856**	3.8	3.0	1.2	**1.0**	12.4
1995–96	New York	27	2	18.4	.421	.200	.613	2.2	1.8	0.6	0.3	5.0
1996–97	Miami	28	1	10.8	.453	**.421**	.850	1.5	1.2	0.5	0.1	3.0
Career		555	432	28.8	.471	.266	.786	3.8	3.8	1.1	0.6	12.2

=== Playoffs ===
Year	Team	GP	GS	MPG	FG%	3P%	FT%	RPG	APG	SPG	BPG	PPG
1990	San Antonio	10	**10**	37.5	**.518**	.400	.806	**5.4**	**5.2**	0.9	0.4	**20.5**
1991	San Antonio	4	4	**39.8**	.485	.200	.615	4.3	4.8	**1.5**	**0.5**	19.0
1993	San Antonio	10	0	21.9	.451	.545	.882	2.3	2.8	0.9	0.2	9.5
1994	San Antonio	4	4	26.5	.378	**1.000**	.571	2.0	3.0	1.3	**0.5**	8.3
1995	San Antonio	**11**	0	8.8	.450	.000	.667	1.1	0.9	0.5	0.0	1.8
1996	New York	4	0	16.0	.318	.167	.857	2.3	0.3	1.0	0.0	5.3
1997	Miami	9	0	13.3	.367	.250	**.900**	1.9	0.6	0.4	0.2	3.7
Career		52	18	21.9	.464	.333	.785	2.7	2.4	0.8	0.2	9.3
