= Toronto Raptors all-time roster =

The following is a list of players, both past and current, who appeared on the roster for the Toronto Raptors NBA franchise.

== Players ==
Note: Statistics are correct through the end of the 2025–26 season.

G	Guard	G/F	Guard-forward	F	Forward	F/C	Forward-center	C	Center

legend
^	Denotes player who has been inducted to the Naismith Memorial Basketball Hall of Fame
*	Denotes player who has been selected for at least one All-Star Game with the Toronto Raptors and is currently on the team roster
^{+}	Denotes player who has been selected for at least one All-Star Game with the Toronto Raptors
^{x}	Denotes player who is currently on the Toronto Raptors roster
0.0	Denotes the Toronto Raptors statistics leader (min. 100 games played for the team for per-game statistics)

=== A to B ===
All-time roster
Player	Pos.	Pre-draft team	Yrs	Seasons	Statistics									Ref.
Player	Pos.	Pre-draft team	Yrs	Seasons	GP	MP	REB	AST	PTS	MPG	RPG	APG	PPG	Ref.
Precious Achiuwa	F/C	Memphis	3	2021–2024	153	3,302	937	176	1,365	21.6	6.1	1.2	8.9	
Quincy Acy	F	Baylor	2	2012–2014	36	403	92	15	135	11.2	2.6	0.4	3.8	
Hassan Adams	G	Arizona	1	2008–2009	12	52	7	1	11	4.3	0.6	0.1	0.9	
Ochai Agbaji	G	Kansas	3	2023–2026	133	3,027	427	164	1,029	22.8	3.2	1.2	7.7	
Alexis Ajinça	C	(France) HTV	1	2010–2011	24	265	61	8	114	11.0	2.5	0.3	4.8	
Solomon Alabi	C	Florida State	2	2010–2012	26	181	61	5	39	7.0	2.3	0.2	1.5	
Rafer Alston	G	Fresno State	2	2002–2003; 2004–2005	127	3,697	386	706	1,502	29.1	3.0	5.6	11.8	
David Andersen	C	(Italy) Virtus Bologna	1	2010–2011	11	150	34	7	56	13.6	3.1	0.6	5.1	
Alan Anderson	G/F	Michigan State	2	2011–2013	82	1,956	182	129	856	23.9	2.2	1.6	10.4	
Willie Anderson	G/F	Georgia	1	1995–1996	49	1,564	186	149	606	31.9	3.8	3.0	12.4	
OG Anunoby	F	Indiana	7	2017–2024	395	11,346	1,684	632	4,676	28.7	4.3	1.6	11.8	
Rafael Araújo	C	BYU	2	2004–2006	111	1,337	329	31	317	12.0	3.0	0.3	2.9	
Robert Archibald	F	Illinois	1	2003–2004	30	246	50	12	29	8.2	1.7	0.4	1.0	
Carlos Arroyo	G	FIU	1	2001–2002	17	96	12	21	30	5.6	0.7	1.2	1.8	
D. J. Augustin	G	Texas	1	2013–2014	10	82	4	10	21	8.2	0.4	1.0	2.1	
Mark Baker	G	Ohio State	1	1998–1999	1	2	0	0	0	2.0	0.0	0.0	0.0	
Mo Bamba	C	Texas	1	2025–2026	2	6	2	0	0	3.0	1.0	0.0	0.0	
Marcus Banks	G	UNLV	3	2008–2011	31	306	27	35	129	9.9	0.9	1.1	4.2	
Dalano Banton	G	Nebraska	2	2021–2023	95	975	169	135	347	10.3	1.8	1.4	3.7	
Leandro Barbosa	G	(Brazil) Bauru Basket	2	2010–2012	100	2,341	178	182	1,281	23.4	1.8	1.8	12.8	
Andrea Bargnani	F/C	(Italy) Benetton Treviso	7	2006–2013	433	13,130	2,095	544	6,581	30.3	4.8	1.3	15.2	
Scottie Barnes*	G/F	Florida State	5	2021–2026	356	12,204	2,665	1,842	6,204	34.3	7.5	5.2	17.4	
Andre Barrett	G	Seton Hall	1	2005–2006	17	261	22	50	78	15.4	1.3	2.9	4.6	
RJ Barrett^{x}	G/F	Duke	3	2023–2026	147	4,667	870	633	3,017	31.7	5.9	4.3	20.5	
Will Barton	G	Memphis	1	2022–2023	16	211	26	17	72	13.2	1.6	1.1	4.5	
Maceo Baston	F	Michigan	2	2002–2003; 2007–2008	31	209	49	3	81	6.7	1.6	0.1	2.6	
Mengke Bateer	C	(China) Beijing Ducks	1	2003–2004	7	40	8	1	8	5.7	1.1	0.1	1.1	
Jamison Battle^{x}	F	Ohio State	2	2024–2026	120	1,559	247	77	611	13.0	2.1	0.6	5.1	
Lonny Baxter	F	Maryland	1	2003–2004	36	487	121	10	150	13.5	3.4	0.3	4.2	
Jerryd Bayless	G	Arizona	2	2010–2012	91	2,052	216	356	954	22.5	2.4	3.9	10.5	
Aron Baynes	C	Washington State	1	2020–2021	53	980	273	47	324	18.5	5.2	0.9	6.1	
Marco Belinelli	G/F	(Italy) Fortitudo Bologna	1	2009–2010	66	1,121	95	89	469	17.0	1.4	1.3	7.1	
DeAndre' Bembry	F	Saint Joseph's	1	2020–2021	51	972	146	107	293	19.1	2.9	2.1	5.7	
Benoit Benjamin	C	Creighton	1	1996–1997	4	44	9	1	13	11.0	2.3	0.3	3.3	
Anthony Bennett	F	UNLV	1	2015–2016	19	84	23	0	28	4.4	1.2	0.0	1.5	
Chauncey Billups^	G	Colorado	1	1997–1998	29	920	77	97	328	31.7	2.7	3.3	11.3	
Khem Birch	C	UNLV	3	2020–2023	94	1,730	408	99	517	18.4	4.3	1.1	5.5	
Bismack Biyombo	C	(Spain) Fuenlabrada	1	2015–2016	82	1,808	655	29	454	22.0	8.0	0.4	5.5	
Corie Blount	F	Cincinnati	1	2003–2004	16	294	69	10	38	18.4	4.3	0.6	2.4	
Muggsy Bogues	G	Wake Forest	2	1999–2001	83	1,765	138	304	410	21.3	1.7	3.7	4.9	
Isaac Bonga	G	(Germany) Skyliners Frankfurt	1	2021–2022	15	69	7	4	12	4.6	0.5	0.3	0.8	
Matt Bonner	F	Florida	2	2004–2006	160	3,263	569	104	1,172	20.4	3.6	0.7	7.3	
Chris Bosh^	F/C	Georgia Tech	7	2003–2010	509	18,815	4,776	1,115	10,275	37.0	9.4	2.2	20.2	
Chris Boucher	F/C	Oregon	7	2018–2025	406	7,215	2,083	201	3,612	17.8	5.1	0.5	8.9	
Michael Bradley	F/C	Villanova	3	2001–2004	98	1,470	444	71	371	15.0	4.5	0.7	3.8	
Primož Brezec	C	(Slovenia) Olimpija	1	2007–2008	13	110	18	1	48	8.5	1.4	0.1	3.7	
Oshae Brissett	F	Syracuse	1	2019–2020	19	135	26	7	37	7.1	1.4	0.4	1.9	
Armoni Brooks	G	Houston	1	2021–2022	13	154	22	13	34	11.8	1.7	1.0	2.6	
Bruce Brown	G	Miami (FL)	2	2023–2025	52	1,238	198	120	479	23.8	3.8	2.3	9.2	
Damone Brown	F	Syracuse	1	2002–2003	5	115	15	3	28	23.0	3.0	0.6	5.6	
Dee Brown	G	Jacksonville	3	1997–2000	118	2,958	247	330	1,191	25.1	2.1	2.8	10.1	
Lorenzo Brown	G	NC State	2	2017–2019	40	351	46	41	87	8.8	1.2	1.0	2.2	
Rick Brunson	G	Temple	1	2003–2004	3	10	0	2	4	3.3	0.0	0.7	1.3	
Rasual Butler	G/F	La Salle	1	2011–2012	34	453	66	19	110	13.3	1.9	0.6	3.2	
Dwight Buycks	G	Marquette	1	2013–2014	14	146	23	10	43	10.4	1.6	0.7	3.1	

=== C to D ===
All-time roster
Player	Pos.	Pre-draft team	Yrs	Seasons	Statistics									Ref.
Player	Pos.	Pre-draft team	Yrs	Seasons	GP	MP	REB	AST	PTS	MPG	RPG	APG	PPG	Ref.
Bruno Caboclo	F	(Brazil) Pinheiros Basquete	4	2014–2018	25	113	15	6	27	4.5	0.6	0.2	1.1	
José Calderón	G	(Spain) Saski Baskonia	8	2005–2013	525	14,909	1,315	3,770	5,235	28.4	2.5	7.2	10.0	
Marcus Camby	F/C	UMass	2	1996–1998	126	3,899	860	208	1,700	30.9	6.8	1.7	13.5	
DeMarre Carroll	F	Missouri	2	2015–2017	98	2,668	397	101	924	27.2	4.1	1.0	9.4	
Anthony Carter	G	Hawaii	1	2011–2012	24	209	33	34	47	8.7	1.4	1.4	2.0	
Vince Carter^ (#15)	G/F	North Carolina	7	1998–2005	403	15,114	2,091	1,553	9,420	37.5	5.2	3.9	23.4	
D.J. Carton	G	Marquette	2	2023–2025	8	69	8	6	14	8.6	1.0	0.8	1.8	
Colin Castleton	C	Florida	1	2024–2025	11	288	76	18	79	26.2	6.9	1.6	7.2	
Justin Champagnie	F	Pittsburgh	2	2021–2023	39	292	76	12	87	7.5	1.9	0.3	2.2	
Ulrich Chomche	F	(Rwanda) APR BBC	1	2024–2025	7	32	8	2	5	4.6	1.1	0.3	0.7	
Chris Childs	G	Boise State	2	2000–2002	95	2,126	218	470	402	22.4	2.3	4.9	4.2	
Doug Christie	G/F	Pepperdine	5	1995–2000	314	10,916	1,448	1,197	4,448	34.8	4.6	3.8	14.2	
Keon Clark	F/C	UNLV	2	2000–2002	127	3,153	851	126	1,328	24.8	6.7	1.0	10.5	
Omar Cook	G	St. John's	1	2004–2005	5	74	7	22	23	14.8	1.4	4.4	4.6	
Tyrone Corbin	G/F	DePaul	1	2000–2001	15	117	13	4	20	7.8	0.9	0.3	1.3	
William Cunningham	C	Temple	1	1998–1999	1	1	0	0	0	1.0	0.0	0.0	0.0	
Earl Cureton	F/C	Detroit Mercy	1	1996–1997	9	46	9	4	7	5.1	1.0	0.4	0.8	
Dell Curry	G	Virginia Tech	3	1999–2002	194	2,937	266	225	1,296	15.1	1.4	1.2	6.7	
Michael Curry	G/F	Georgia Southern	1	2003–2004	70	1,229	87	53	204	17.6	1.2	0.8	2.9	
Lloyd Daniels	G	Mt. SAC	1	1997–1998	6	82	7	4	34	13.7	1.2	0.7	5.7	
Kornél Dávid	F	(Hungary) Budapesti Honvéd	1	2000–2001	17	140	33	4	42	8.2	1.9	0.2	2.5	
Antonio Davis^{+}	F/C	UTEP	6	1999–2004; 2005–2006	310	10,809	2,839	518	3,994	34.9	9.2	1.7	12.9	
Ed Davis	F	North Carolina	3	2010–2013	176	4,223	1,200	155	1,354	24.0	6.8	0.9	7.7	
Hubert Davis	G	North Carolina	1	1996–1997	36	623	40	34	181	17.3	1.1	0.9	5.0	
Terence Davis	G	Ole Miss	2	2019–2021	106	1,702	303	152	777	16.1	2.9	1.4	7.3	
Austin Daye	F	Gonzaga	1	2013–2014	8	33	7	2	8	4.1	0.9	0.3	1.0	
Nando de Colo	G	(France) Cholet Basket	1	2013–2014	21	193	28	33	65	9.2	1.3	1.6	3.1	
Sam Dekker	F	Wisconsin	1	2021–2022	1	1	0	0	0	1.0	0.0	0.0	0.0	
Carlos Delfino	G	(Italy) Fortitudo Bologna	1	2007–2008	82	1,928	359	145	738	23.5	4.4	1.8	9.0	
Justin Dentmon	G	Washington	1	2011–2012	4	72	7	9	22	18.0	1.8	2.3	5.5	
DeMar DeRozan^{+}	G/F	USC	9	2009–2018	675	22,986	2,739	2,078	13,296	34.1	4.1	3.1	19.7	
Derrick Dial	G	Eastern Michigan	1	2001–2002	7	50	11	4	28	7.1	1.6	0.6	4.0	
Gradey Dick^{x}	G	Kansas	3	2023–2026	190	3,922	472	217	1,742	20.6	2.5	1.1	9.2	
Juan Dixon	G	Maryland	2	2006–2008	62	1,107	120	106	441	17.9	1.9	1.7	7.1	
Joey Dorsey	F	Memphis	1	2010–2011	43	522	190	27	135	12.1	4.4	0.6	3.1	
Quincy Douby	G	Rutgers	1	2008–2009	7	73	7	12	31	10.4	1.0	1.7	4.4	
Jeff Dowtin	G	Rhode Island	1	2022–2023	25	259	23	31	61	10.4	0.9	1.2	2.4	
Goran Dragić	G	(Slovenia) Olimpija	1	2021–2022	5	90	14	9	40	18.0	2.8	1.8	8.0	
Ronald Dupree	F	LSU	1	2010–2011	3	13	3	1	2	4.3	1.0	0.3	0.7	

=== E to G ===
All-time roster
Player	Pos.	Pre-draft team	Yrs	Seasons	Statistics									Ref.
Player	Pos.	Pre-draft team	Yrs	Seasons	GP	MP	REB	AST	PTS	MPG	RPG	APG	PPG	Ref.
Acie Earl	F/C	Iowa	2	1995–1997	80	1,112	214	45	478	13.9	2.7	0.6	6.0	
Henry Ellenson	F	Marquette	1	2020–2021	2	38	12	5	15	19.0	6.0	2.5	7.5	
Vincenzo Esposito	G	(Italy) JuveCaserta Basket	1	1995–1996	30	282	16	23	116	9.4	0.5	0.8	3.9	
Reggie Evans	F	Iowa	2	2009–2011	58	1,109	450	46	227	19.1	7.8	0.8	3.9	
Bruno Fernando	C	Maryland	1	2024–2025	17	147	51	18	58	8.6	3.0	1.1	3.4	
Landry Fields	F	Stanford	3	2012–2015	107	1,575	293	95	354	14.7	2.7	0.9	3.3	
Malachi Flynn	G	Washington State	4	2020–2024	175	2,630	320	350	945	15.0	1.8	2.0	5.4	
Gary Forbes	F	UMass	1	2011–2012	48	713	102	54	319	14.9	2.1	1.1	6.6	
T. J. Ford	G	Texas	2	2006–2008	126	3,442	336	908	1,664	27.3	2.7	7.2	13.2	
Greg Foster	F/C	UTEP	1	2002–2003	29	539	102	13	121	18.6	3.5	0.4	4.2	
Javon Freeman-Liberty	G	DePaul	1	2023–2024	22	403	70	40	153	18.3	3.2	1.8	7.0	
Markelle Fultz	G	Washington	1	2025–2026	5	36	1	8	4	7.2	0.2	1.6	0.8	
Sundiata Gaines	G	Georgia	1	2010–2011	6	90	8	11	35	15.0	1.3	1.8	5.8	
Jorge Garbajosa	F	(Spain) Saski Baskonia	2	2006–2008	74	1,983	345	128	589	26.8	4.7	1.7	8.0	
Chris Garner	G	Memphis	1	1997–1998	38	293	24	45	53	7.7	0.6	1.2	1.4	
Marc Gasol	C	(Spain) CB Sant Josep	2	2018–2020	70	1,809	447	248	568	25.8	6.4	3.5	8.1	
Rudy Gay	F	UConn	2	2012–2014	51	1,785	345	134	993	35.0	6.8	2.6	19.5	
Freddie Gillespie	F	Baylor	1	2020–2021	20	392	97	9	111	19.6	4.9	0.5	5.6	
Dion Glover	G	Georgia Tech	1	2003–2004	14	178	29	15	64	12.7	2.1	1.1	4.6	
Joey Graham	F	Oklahoma State	4	2005–2009	275	4,772	851	167	1,771	17.4	3.1	0.6	6.4	
Aaron Gray	C	Pittsburgh	3	2011–2014	95	1,346	422	63	315	14.2	4.4	0.7	3.3	
Danny Green	G/F	North Carolina	1	2018–2019	80	2,216	317	126	821	27.7	4.0	1.6	10.3	
Mouhamadou Gueye	F	Pittsburgh	1	2023–2024	11	120	23	5	26	10.9	2.1	0.5	2.4	

=== H to J ===
All-time roster
Player	Pos.	Pre-draft team	Yrs	Seasons	Statistics									Ref.
Player	Pos.	Pre-draft team	Yrs	Seasons	GP	MP	REB	AST	PTS	MPG	RPG	APG	PPG	Ref.
Zendon Hamilton	F/C	St. John's	1	2002–2003	3	12	4	0	6	4.0	1.3	0.0	2.0	
Tyler Hansbrough	F	North Carolina	2	2013–2015	138	2,036	552	38	582	14.8	4.0	0.3	4.2	
Ron Harper Jr.	F	Rutgers	2	2022–2024	10	52	7	5	20	5.2	0.7	0.5	2.0	
Jalen Harris	G	Nevada	1	2020–2021	13	172	18	17	96	13.2	1.4	1.3	7.4	
Chuck Hayes	F/C	Kentucky	2	2013–2015	74	830	214	49	149	11.2	2.9	0.7	2.0	
Nigel Hayes-Davis	F	Wisconsin	1	2017–2018	2	6	0	0	6	3.0	0.0	0.0	3.0	
Chucky Hepburn^{x}	G	Louisville	1	2025–2026	2	13	1	2	0	6.5	0.5	1.0	0.0	
Dewan Hernandez	C	Miami (FL)	1	2019–2020	6	28	14	3	14	4.7	2.3	0.5	2.3	
Juancho Hernangómez	F	(Spain) Estudiantes	1	2022–2023	42	614	123	25	122	14.6	2.9	0.6	2.9	
Rondae Hollis-Jefferson	F	Arizona	1	2019–2020	60	1,122	283	106	418	18.7	4.7	1.8	7.0	
Rodney Hood	G/F	Duke	1	2020–2021	17	216	30	6	66	12.7	1.8	0.4	3.9	
Nate Huffman	C	Central Michigan	1	2002–2003	7	76	23	5	23	10.9	3.3	0.7	3.3	
Kris Humphries	F/C	Minnesota	3	2006–2009	159	1,860	516	56	738	11.7	3.2	0.4	4.6	
Lindsey Hunter	G	Jackson State	1	2002–2003	29	673	59	71	280	23.2	2.0	2.4	9.7	
Serge Ibaka	F/C	(Spain) CB L'Hospitalet	4	2016–2020	228	6,300	1,687	253	3,243	27.6	7.4	1.1	14.2	
Brandon Ingram*	F	Duke	1	2025–2026	77	2,604	430	284	1,655	33.8	5.6	3.7	21.5	
Jarrett Jack	G	Georgia Tech	2	2009–2011	95	2,590	264	472	1,071	27.3	2.8	5.0	11.3	
Jermaine Jackson	G	Detroit Mercy	2	2001–2003	48	566	52	96	123	11.8	1.1	2.0	2.6	
Luke Jackson	F	Oregon	1	2006–2007	10	122	9	9	45	12.2	0.9	0.9	4.5	
Mark Jackson	G	St. John's	1	2000–2001	54	1,802	185	498	461	33.4	3.4	9.2	8.5	
Trayce Jackson-Davis^{x}	C	Indiana	1	2025–2026	17	85	33	7	31	5.0	1.9	0.4	1.8	
Mike James	G	Duquesne	1	2005–2006	79	2,925	262	460	1,604	37.0	3.3	5.8	20.3	
Nathan Jawai	F/C	Midland College	1	2008–2009	6	19	2	0	2	3.2	0.3	0.0	0.3	
Chris Jefferies	G/F	Fresno State	2	2002–2004	53	674	60	23	205	12.7	1.1	0.4	3.9	
Amir Johnson	F/C	Westchester HS (CA)	6	2009–2015	451	11,377	2,836	562	3,957	25.2	6.3	1.2	8.8	
David Johnson	G	Louisville	1	2021–2022	2	2	0	0	0	1.0	0.0	0.0	0.0	
James Johnson	F	Wake Forest	4	2010–2012; 2014–2016	214	4,556	793	359	1,636	21.3	3.7	1.7	7.6	
Linton Johnson	F	Tulane	1	2007–2008	2	10	1	1	6	5.0	0.5	0.5	3.0	
Stanley Johnson	F	Arizona	2	2019–2021	86	1,156	190	109	327	13.4	2.2	1.3	3.8	
Trey Johnson	G	Jackson State	1	2010–2011	7	81	7	11	28	11.6	1.0	1.6	4.0	
Fred Jones	G/F	Oregon	1	2006–2007	39	870	82	55	297	22.3	2.1	1.4	7.6	
Popeye Jones	F	Murray State	2	1996–1998	93	2,773	782	102	736	29.8	8.4	1.1	7.9	
Cory Joseph	G	Texas	2	2015–2017	160	4,049	445	515	1,417	25.3	2.8	3.2	8.9	
Garth Joseph	C	Saint Rose	1	2000–2001	2	8	2	1	2	4.0	1.0	0.5	1.0	

=== K to M ===
All-time roster
Player	Pos.	Pre-draft team	Yrs	Seasons	Statistics									Ref.
Player	Pos.	Pre-draft team	Yrs	Seasons	GP	MP	REB	AST	PTS	MPG	RPG	APG	PPG	Ref.
Jason Kapono	F	UCLA	2	2007–2009	161	3,361	283	170	1,234	20.9	1.8	1.1	7.7	
Tim Kempton	F/C	Notre Dame	1	1997–1998	5	32	5	2	4	6.4	1.0	0.4	0.8	
Jimmy King	G	Michigan	1	1995–1996	62	868	110	88	279	14.0	1.8	1.4	4.5	
Linas Kleiza	F	Missouri	3	2010–2013	108	2,465	428	102	1,057	22.8	4.0	0.9	9.8	
Negele Knight	G	Dayton	1	1998–1999	6	56	6	8	8	9.3	1.0	1.3	1.3	
Christian Koloko	C	Arizona	1	2022–2023	58	802	171	31	182	13.8	2.9	0.5	3.1	
Antonio Lang	G/F	Duke	1	1999–2000	7	32	5	1	3	4.6	0.7	0.1	0.4	
A.J. Lawson^{x}	G	South Carolina	2	2024–2026	50	712	129	38	337	14.2	2.6	0.8	6.7	
Alex Len	C	Maryland	1	2020–2021	7	76	11	3	16	10.9	1.6	0.4	2.3	
Voshon Lenard	G	Minnesota	1	2002–2003	63	1,929	212	144	898	30.6	3.4	2.3	14.3	
Kawhi Leonard^{+}	F	San Diego State	1	2018–2019	60	2,040	439	199	1,596	34.0	7.3	3.3	26.6	
Martin Lewis	F	Seward County CC	2	1995–1997	25	239	35	7	89	9.6	1.4	0.3	3.6	
Kira Lewis Jr.	G	Alabama	1	2023–2024	1	2	0	0	0	2.0	0.0	0.0	0.0	
Jeremy Lin	G	Harvard	1	2018–2019	23	433	60	50	161	18.8	2.6	2.2	7.0	
Brad Lohaus	F/C	Iowa	1	1996–1997	6	45	7	1	10	7.5	1.2	0.2	1.7	
Art Long	F	Cincinnati	1	2002–2003	7	80	20	4	20	11.4	2.9	0.6	2.9	
John Long	G/F	Detroit Mercy	1	1996–1997	32	370	40	21	129	11.6	1.3	0.7	4.0	
Kyle Lowry^{+}	G	Villanova	9	2012–2021	601	20,813	2,954	4,277	10,540	34.6	4.9	7.1	17.5	
Jordan Loyd	G	Indianapolis	1	2018–2019	12	55	9	6	29	4.6	0.8	0.5	2.4	
John Lucas III	G	Oklahoma State	1	2012–2013	63	827	65	105	333	13.1	1.0	1.7	5.3	
Jamaal Magloire	C	Kentucky	1	2011–2012	34	374	113	6	41	11.0	3.3	0.2	1.2	
Sandro Mamukelashvili^{x}	C	Seton Hall	1	2025–2026	80	1,751	395	151	893	21.9	4.9	1.9	11.2	
Shawn Marion	F	UNLV	1	2008–2009	27	954	224	62	386	35.3	8.3	2.3	14.3	
Sean Marks	F/C	California	2	1998–2000	13	40	3	0	19	3.1	0.2	0.0	1.5	
Donyell Marshall	F	UConn	2	2003–2005	131	4,225	1,137	175	1,813	32.3	8.7	1.3	13.8	
Alijah Martin^{x}	G	Florida	1	2025–2026	23	146	21	12	51	6.3	0.9	0.5	2.2	
Darrick Martin	G	UCLA	3	2005–2008	88	700	39	121	223	8.0	0.4	1.4	2.5	
Roger Mason Jr.	G	Virginia	1	2003–2004	23	285	28	23	93	12.4	1.2	1.0	4.0	
Tony Massenburg	F	Maryland	1	1995–1996	24	659	166	18	243	27.5	6.9	0.8	10.1	
Bob McCann	F	Morehead State	1	1997–1998	1	5	1	0	0	5.0	1.0	0.0	0.0	
Patrick McCaw	G	UNLV	3	2018–2021	68	1,285	134	110	244	18.9	2.0	1.6	3.6	
Jelani McCoy	C	UCLA	1	2002–2003	67	1,367	355	43	457	20.4	5.3	0.6	6.8	
Jalen McDaniels	F	San Diego State	1	2023–2024	50	538	79	37	169	10.8	1.6	0.7	3.4	
Tracy McGrady^	G/F	MZCA (NC)	3	1997–2000	192	4,747	1,048	474	2,122	24.7	5.5	2.5	11.1	
Dominic McGuire	F	Fresno State	1	2012–2013	15	230	48	10	32	15.3	3.2	0.7	2.1	
Alfonzo McKinnie	F	Green Bay	1	2017–2018	14	53	7	1	21	3.8	0.5	0.1	1.5	
Jodie Meeks	G	Kentucky	1	2018–2019	8	104	12	8	51	13.0	1.5	1.0	6.4	
Pops Mensah-Bonsu	F	George Washington	2	2008–2010	35	370	134	8	130	10.6	3.8	0.2	3.7	
C. J. Miles	G/F	Skyline HS (TX)	2	2017–2019	110	1,899	220	77	917	17.3	2.0	0.7	8.3	
Malcolm Miller	F	Holy Cross	3	2017–2020	53	355	36	15	108	6.7	0.7	0.3	2.0	
Oliver Miller	C	Arkansas	3	1995–1998	159	4,460	1,035	444	1,497	28.1	6.5	2.8	9.4	
Davion Mitchell	G	Baylor	1	2024–2025	44	1,080	85	203	279	24.5	1.9	4.6	6.3	
Jonathan Mogbo^{x}	F	San Francisco	2	2024–2026	103	1,535	379	171	450	14.9	3.7	1.7	4.4	
Jérôme Moïso	F/C	UCLA	2	2003–2005	43	486	136	8	116	11.3	3.2	0.2	2.7	
Greg Monroe	F/C	Georgetown	1	2018–2019	38	423	156	16	183	11.1	4.1	0.4	4.8	
Eric Montross	C	North Carolina	2	2000–2002	61	736	169	20	129	12.1	2.8	0.3	2.1	
Jamario Moon	F	Meridian CC	2	2007–2009	132	3,545	733	160	1,054	26.9	5.6	1.2	8.0	
Eric Moreland	F/C	Oregon State	1	2018–2019	4	38	17	4	7	9.5	4.3	1.0	1.8	
Juwan Morgan	F	Indiana	1	2021–2022	1	27	4	1	5	27.0	4.0	1.0	5.0	
Lamond Murray	F	California	2	2003–2005	95	1,436	254	75	568	15.1	2.7	0.8	6.0	
Tracy Murray	F	UCLA	3	1995–1996; 2000–2002	160	3,384	464	164	1,759	21.2	2.9	1.0	11.0	
Collin Murray-Boyles^{x}	F	South Carolina	1	2025–2026	57	1,246	285	106	484	21.9	5.0	1.9	8.5	
Svi Mykhailiuk	F	Kansas	1	2021–2022	56	716	92	45	255	12.8	1.6	0.8	4.6	

=== N to P ===
All-time roster
Player	Pos.	Pre-draft team	Yrs	Seasons	Statistics									Ref.
Player	Pos.	Pre-draft team	Yrs	Seasons	GP	MP	REB	AST	PTS	MPG	RPG	APG	PPG	Ref.
Mamadou N'Diaye	C	Auburn	3	2000–2003	30	420	95	7	144	14.0	3.2	0.2	4.8	
Rasho Nesterović	C	(Italy) Virtus Bologna	3	2006–2008; 2009–2010	193	3,575	791	181	1,209	18.5	4.1	0.9	6.3	
Lucas Nogueira	C	(Spain) Estudiantes	4	2014–2018	141	1,754	388	72	446	12.4	2.8	0.5	3.2	
Steve Novak	F	Marquette	1	2013–2014	54	540	58	13	178	10.0	1.1	0.2	3.3	
Markquis Nowell	G	Kansas State	1	2023–2024	1	4	2	2	2	4.0	2.0	2.0	2.0	
Jordan Nwora	F	Louisville	1	2023–2024	34	529	116	44	270	15.6	3.4	1.3	7.9	
Charles Oakley	F	Virginia Union	3	1998–2001	208	6,831	1,655	685	1,644	32.8	8.0	3.3	7.9	
Patrick O'Bryant	C	Bradley	2	2008–2010	24	198	43	4	80	8.3	1.8	0.2	3.3	
Hakeem Olajuwon^	C	Houston	1	2001–2002	61	1,378	366	66	435	22.6	6.0	1.1	7.1	
Jimmy Oliver	G/F	Purdue	1	1996–1997	4	43	5	1	11	10.8	1.3	0.3	2.8	
Kelly Olynyk	C	Gonzaga	2	2023–2025	52	1,123	246	184	527	21.6	4.7	3.5	10.1	
Jermaine O'Neal	F/C	Eau Claire HS (SC)	1	2008–2009	41	1,216	288	67	555	29.7	7.0	1.6	13.5	
Dan O'Sullivan	C	Fordham	1	1995–1996	5	139	32	2	33	27.8	6.4	0.4	6.6	
Daniel Oturu	C	Minnesota	1	2021–2022	3	27	5	0	9	9.0	1.7	0.0	3.0	
Milt Palacio	G	Colorado State	2	2003–2005	139	2,744	236	463	724	19.7	1.7	3.3	5.2	
Jannero Pargo	G	Arkansas	1	2003–2004	5	71	4	12	18	14.2	0.8	2.4	3.6	
Anthony Parker	G	Bradley	3	2006–2009	235	7,708	934	605	2,785	32.8	4.0	2.6	11.9	
Patrick Patterson	F	Kentucky	4	2013–2017	273	6,893	1,311	388	2,073	25.2	4.8	1.4	7.6	
Morris Peterson	F	Michigan State	7	2000–2007	542	16,059	2,064	965	6,498	29.6	3.8	1.8	12.0	
Mickaël Piétrus	G/F	(France) Élan Béarnais	1	2012–2013	19	386	36	9	100	20.3	1.9	0.5	5.3	
Ed Pinckney	F	Villanova	1	1995–1996	47	1,031	282	50	328	21.9	6.0	1.1	7.0	
Jakob Poeltl^{x}	C	Utah	6	2016–2018; 2022–2026	315	7,011	2,094	503	2,945	22.3	6.6	1.6	9.3	
Shamorie Ponds	G	St. John's	1	2019–2020	4	11	1	2	9	2.8	0.3	0.5	2.3	
Jontay Porter	F	Missouri	1	2023–2024	26	360	82	60	115	13.8	3.2	2.3	4.4	
Otto Porter Jr.	F	Georgetown	2	2022–2024	23	320	48	16	83	13.9	2.1	0.7	3.6	
Norman Powell	G	UCLA	6	2015–2021	349	7,037	854	477	3,463	20.2	2.4	1.4	9.9	

=== Q to S ===
All-time roster
Player	Pos.	Pre-draft team	Yrs	Seasons	Statistics									Ref.
Player	Pos.	Pre-draft team	Yrs	Seasons	GP	MP	REB	AST	PTS	MPG	RPG	APG	PPG	Ref.
Immanuel Quickley^{x}	G	Kentucky	3	2023–2026	141	4,414	581	863	2,420	31.3	4.1	6.1	17.2	
Aleksandar Radojević	C	Barton CC	1	1999–2000	3	24	8	1	7	8.0	2.7	0.3	2.3	
Jahmi'us Ramsey	G	Texas Tech	1	2023–2024	7	121	22	8	47	17.3	3.1	1.1	6.7	
Shawn Respert	G	Michigan State	2	1996–1998	74	1,108	105	76	409	15.0	1.4	1.0	5.5	
Jared Rhoden	G	Seton Hall	1	2024–2025	10	215	38	14	114	21.5	3.8	1.4	11.4	
Malachi Richardson	G	Syracuse	2	2017–2019	23	108	14	0	32	4.7	0.6	0.0	1.4	
Alvin Robertson	G	Arkansas	1	1995–1996	77	2,478	342	323	718	32.2	4.4	4.2	9.3	
Orlando Robinson	C	Fresno State	1	2024–2025	35	713	206	68	284	20.4	5.9	1.9	8.1	
Carlos Rogers	F/C	Tennessee State	3	1995–1998	130	2,791	539	88	1,089	21.5	4.1	0.7	8.4	
Roy Rogers	F	Alabama	1	1997–1998	6	69	12	1	13	11.5	2.0	0.2	2.2	
Jalen Rose	G/F	Michigan	3	2003–2006	177	5,914	607	595	2,862	33.4	3.4	3.4	16.2	
Terrence Ross	G/F	Washington	5	2012–2017	363	8,444	945	319	3,432	23.3	2.6	0.9	9.5	
Clifford Rozier	F/C	Louisville	1	1996–1997	41	732	234	31	189	17.9	5.7	0.8	4.6	
John Salley	F/C	Georgia Tech	1	1995–1996	25	482	97	39	149	19.3	3.9	1.6	6.0	
John Salmons	G	Miami (FL)	1	2013–2014	60	1,281	117	103	298	21.4	2.0	1.7	5.0	
Dennis Schröder	G	(Germany) Löwen Braunschweig	1	2023–2024	51	1,559	140	313	698	30.6	2.7	6.1	13.7	
Luis Scola	F	(Spain) Saski Baskonia	1	2015–2016	76	1,636	360	66	664	21.5	4.7	0.9	8.7	
Jamal Shead^{x}	G	Houston	2	2024–2026	157	3,319	358	760	1,078	21.1	1.6	4.8	6.9	
Pascal Siakam^{+}	F	New Mexico State	8	2016–2024	510	15,786	3,324	1,846	8,875	31.0	6.5	3.6	17.4	
Kobi Simmons	G	Arizona	1	2023–2024	4	67	7	12	20	16.8	1.8	3.0	5.0	
Reggie Slater	F	Wyoming	3	1996–1999	134	2,331	470	100	943	17.4	3.5	0.7	7.0	
Uroš Slokar	F	(Italy) Benetton Treviso	1	2006–2007	20	72	14	1	38	3.6	0.7	0.1	1.9	
Will Solomon	G	Clemson	1	2008–2009	39	544	43	123	193	13.9	1.1	3.2	4.9	
Pape Sow	F	Cal State Fullerton	3	2004–2007	76	879	214	12	219	11.6	2.8	0.2	2.9	
Michael Stewart	C	California	4	1998–2002	121	999	247	16	174	8.3	2.0	0.1	1.4	
Greg Stiemsma	C	Wisconsin	1	2014–2015	17	66	15	3	14	3.9	0.9	0.2	0.8	
Peja Stojaković	G/F	(Greece) PAOK	1	2010–2011	2	22	3	1	20	11.0	1.5	0.5	10.0	
Ed Stokes	C	Arizona	1	1997–1998	4	17	4	1	3	4.3	1.0	0.3	0.8	
Julyan Stone	G	UTEP	1	2013–2014	21	120	20	12	18	5.7	1.0	0.6	0.9	
Damon Stoudamire	G	Arizona	3	1995–1998	200	8,209	828	1,761	3,917	41.0	4.1	8.8	19.6	
Rod Strickland	G	DePaul	1	2003–2004	15	282	37	59	71	18.8	2.5	3.9	4.7	
Jared Sullinger	F	Ohio State	1	2016–2017	11	118	27	3	37	10.7	2.5	0.3	3.4	
Cole Swider	F	Syracuse	1	2024–2025	8	156	25	2	59	19.5	3.1	0.3	7.4	

=== T to Y ===
All-time roster
Player	Pos.	Pre-draft team	Yrs	Seasons	Statistics									Ref.
Player	Pos.	Pre-draft team	Yrs	Seasons	GP	MP	REB	AST	PTS	MPG	RPG	APG	PPG	Ref.
Žan Tabak	C	(Croatia) Split	3	1995–1998	119	2,302	523	112	846	19.3	4.4	0.9	7.1	
Sebastian Telfair	G	Abraham Lincoln HS (NY)	1	2012–2013	13	185	16	39	56	14.2	1.2	3.0	4.3	
Garrett Temple^{x}	G	LSU	3	2023–2026	77	589	83	68	158	7.6	1.1	0.9	2.1	
John Thomas	F	Minnesota	3	1997–2000	115	1,237	245	28	326	10.8	2.1	0.2	2.8	
Matt Thomas	G	Iowa State	2	2019–2021	67	632	82	31	273	9.4	1.2	0.5	4.1	
Jason Thompson	F/C	Rider	1	2015–2016	19	292	80	10	87	15.4	4.2	0.5	4.6	
Gary Trent	F	Ohio	1	1997–1998	13	355	104	14	159	27.3	8.0	1.1	12.2	
Gary Trent Jr.	G	Duke	4	2020–2024	224	7,100	613	388	3,680	31.7	2.7	1.7	16.4	
P. J. Tucker	F	Texas	2	2006–2007; 2016–2017	41	692	152	29	169	16.9	3.7	0.7	4.1	
Hedo Türkoğlu	F	(Turkey) Anadolu Efes	1	2009–2010	74	2,272	343	304	835	30.7	4.6	4.1	11.3	
Roko Ukić	G	(Croatia) Split	1	2008–2009	72	890	75	153	301	12.4	1.0	2.1	4.2	
Ben Uzoh	G	Tulsa	1	2011–2012	16	357	63	59	77	22.3	3.9	3.7	4.8	
Jonas Valančiūnas	C	(Lithuania) Rytas	7	2012–2019	470	11,774	3,961	350	5,524	25.1	8.4	0.7	11.8	
Fred VanVleet^{+}	G	Wichita State	7	2016–2023	417	12,398	1,385	2,199	6,090	29.7	3.3	5.3	14.6	
Greivis Vásquez	G	Maryland	2	2013–2015	143	3,305	355	530	1,357	23.1	2.5	3.7	9.5	
Charlie Villanueva	F	UConn	1	2005–2006	81	2,361	521	88	1,053	29.1	6.4	1.1	13.0	
Jake Voskuhl	C	UConn	1	2008–2009	38	240	59	8	35	6.3	1.6	0.2	0.9	
John Wallace	F	Syracuse	2	1997–1999	130	3,173	544	156	1,558	24.4	4.2	1.2	12.0	
Ja'Kobe Walter^{x}	G	Baylor	2	2024–2026	124	2,577	345	167	990	20.8	2.8	1.3	8.0	
Yuta Watanabe	F	George Washington	2	2020–2022	88	1,168	251	61	381	13.3	2.9	0.7	4.3	
Tremont Waters	G	LSU	1	2021–2022	2	42	4	7	8	21.0	2.0	3.5	4.0	
Paul Watson	F	Fresno State	2	2019–2021	35	367	60	22	142	10.5	1.7	0.6	4.1	
Sonny Weems	G/F	Arkansas	2	2009–2011	128	2,781	345	205	1,063	21.7	2.7	1.6	8.3	
Donald Whiteside	G	Northern Illinois	1	1996–1997	27	259	12	36	59	9.6	0.4	1.3	2.2	
Dwayne Whitfield	F	Jackson State	1	1995–1996	8	122	25	2	40	15.3	3.1	0.3	5.0	
Joe Wieskamp	G/F	Iowa	1	2022–2023	9	50	4	3	9	5.6	0.4	0.3	1.0	
Aaron Williams	F/C	Xavier	2	2004–2006	37	264	44	3	61	7.1	1.2	0.1	1.6	
Alvin Williams	G	Villanova	8	1997–2004; 2005–2006	417	11,736	1,079	1,791	3,876	28.1	2.6	4.3	9.3	
Eric Williams	F	Providence	2	2004–2006	62	935	127	65	250	15.1	2.0	1.0	4.0	
Herb Williams	F/C	Ohio State	1	1995–1996	1	31	8	0	6	31.0	8.0	0.0	6.0	
Jerome Williams	F	Georgetown	4	2000–2004	180	4,772	1,268	194	1,417	26.5	7.0	1.1	7.9	
Lou Williams	G	South Gwinnett HS (GA)	1	2014–2015	80	2,016	151	164	1,242	25.2	1.9	2.1	15.5	
Malik Williams	C	Louisville	1	2023–2024	7	107	38	2	19	15.3	5.4	0.3	2.7	
Micheal Williams	G	Baylor	1	1998–1999	2	15	1	0	2	7.5	0.5	0.0	1.0	
Walt Williams	F	Maryland	2	1996–1998	101	3,523	485	266	1,547	34.9	4.8	2.6	15.3	
Corliss Williamson	F	Arkansas	1	2000–2001	42	886	153	33	390	21.1	3.6	0.8	9.3	
Kevin Willis	F/C	Michigan State	3	1998–2001	156	3,666	1,055	137	1,417	23.5	6.8	0.9	9.1	
D. J. Wilson	F	Michigan	1	2021–2022	4	54	16	5	30	13.5	4.0	1.3	7.5	
Loren Woods	F/C	Arizona	2	2004–2006	72	1,036	330	21	238	14.4	4.6	0.3	3.3	
Haywoode Workman	G	Oral Roberts	1	1999–2000	13	102	9	17	20	7.8	0.7	1.3	1.5	
Antoine Wright	G/F	Texas A&M	1	2009–2010	67	1,392	190	71	435	20.8	2.8	1.1	6.5	
Delon Wright	G	Utah	4	2015–2019	172	3,005	408	398	1,145	17.5	2.4	2.3	6.7	
Julian Wright	F	Kansas	1	2010–2011	52	766	118	58	188	14.7	2.3	1.1	3.6	
Sharone Wright	C	Clemson	3	1995–1998	78	1,351	252	43	587	17.3	3.2	0.6	7.5	
Thaddeus Young	F	Georgia Tech	3	2021–2024	103	1,620	356	170	518	15.7	3.5	1.7	5.0	
