= Liberal High School =

Liberal High School is the name of more than one educational institution.

== United States ==
- Liberal High School (Kansas) in Liberal, Kansas
- Liberal High School (Missouri) in Liberal, Missouri
