= Melvin Sanders =

American basketball player (born 1981)

Personal information
- Born: January 3, 1981 (age 45) Liberal, Kansas, U.S.
- Listed height: 6 ft 5 in (1.96 m)
- Listed weight: 206 lb (93 kg)

Career information
- High school: Liberal (Liberal, Kansas)
- College: Seward County CC (1999–2000); Oklahoma State (2000–2003)
- NBA draft: 2003: undrafted
- Playing career: 2003–2014
- Position: Shooting guard / small forward
- Number: 34

Career history
- 2003–2005: Dakota Wizards
- 2004: Metis Varese
- 2005: Oostende
- 2005–2006: San Antonio Spurs
- 2006: Fayetteville Patriots
- 2006–2007: Pau-Orthez
- 2007: Panellinios
- 2007–2008: Unicaja Málaga
- 2008–2010: Gran Canaria
- 2010–2011: Minsk-2006
- 2011: Menorca Bàsquet
- 2011–2012: Hacettepe Üniversitesi
- 2012–2013: Basket Barcellona
- 2013: Pınar Karşıyaka
- 2013–2014: Valladolid

Career highlights
- French Cup winner (2007); CBA champion (2004); All-CBA Second Team (2005); CBA All-Defensive Team (2005)
- Stats at NBA.com
- Stats at Basketball Reference

Melvin Ray Sanders (born January 3, 1981) is an American former professional basketball player. He played for the National Basketball Association's San Antonio Spurs.

== Professional career ==
A graduate of Oklahoma State University, Sanders, a guard and forward, played for Varese in the Italian league and Telindus Oostende in Belgium, the Dakota Wizards of the Continental Basketball Association (CBA), and the NBA Development League's Fayetteville Patriots. He earned All-CBA Second Team and All-Defensive Team honors with the Wizards in 2005. During the 2005-06 NBA season, he signed 10-day contract stints with the San Antonio Spurs. After his fourth such contract (including training camp) expired, on March 26, 2006, the Spurs signed Sanders for the remainder of the season.

On January 9, 2007, he signed a contract with Pau-Orthez of the French League. He averaged 10.5 points, 3.3 rebounds and 1.2 steals in 10 Euroleague games, and also helped Pau win the French Cup. On July 20, 2007, Sanders signed with Panellinios of the Greek League. However, in mid-December 2007 he was brought out of his contract by one of the top clubs in the ACB Unicaja Malaga after seeing limited action due to a broken collarbone sustained in a car accident during the preseason.

On December 25, 2007, he signed with Unicaja of the Spanish ACB. On July 10, 2008, Sanders was signed by Kalise Gran Canaria of the ACB.

He signed with BC Minsk-2006 in September 2010. In February 2011, he signed with Menorca Bàsquet. Later that year, he signed with Hacettepe Üniversitesi of the Turkish Basketball League.

In August 2012, he signed with Basket Barcellona of the Italian Second League. On March 6, 2013, he signed a contract with Pınar Karşıyaka for the remainder of that season.

In December 2013, Sanders signed with CB Valladolid and left the team on 21 January 2014 because of non-payment from the club.
