= Liberal, Kansas =

City in Seward County, Kansas

- City and county seat
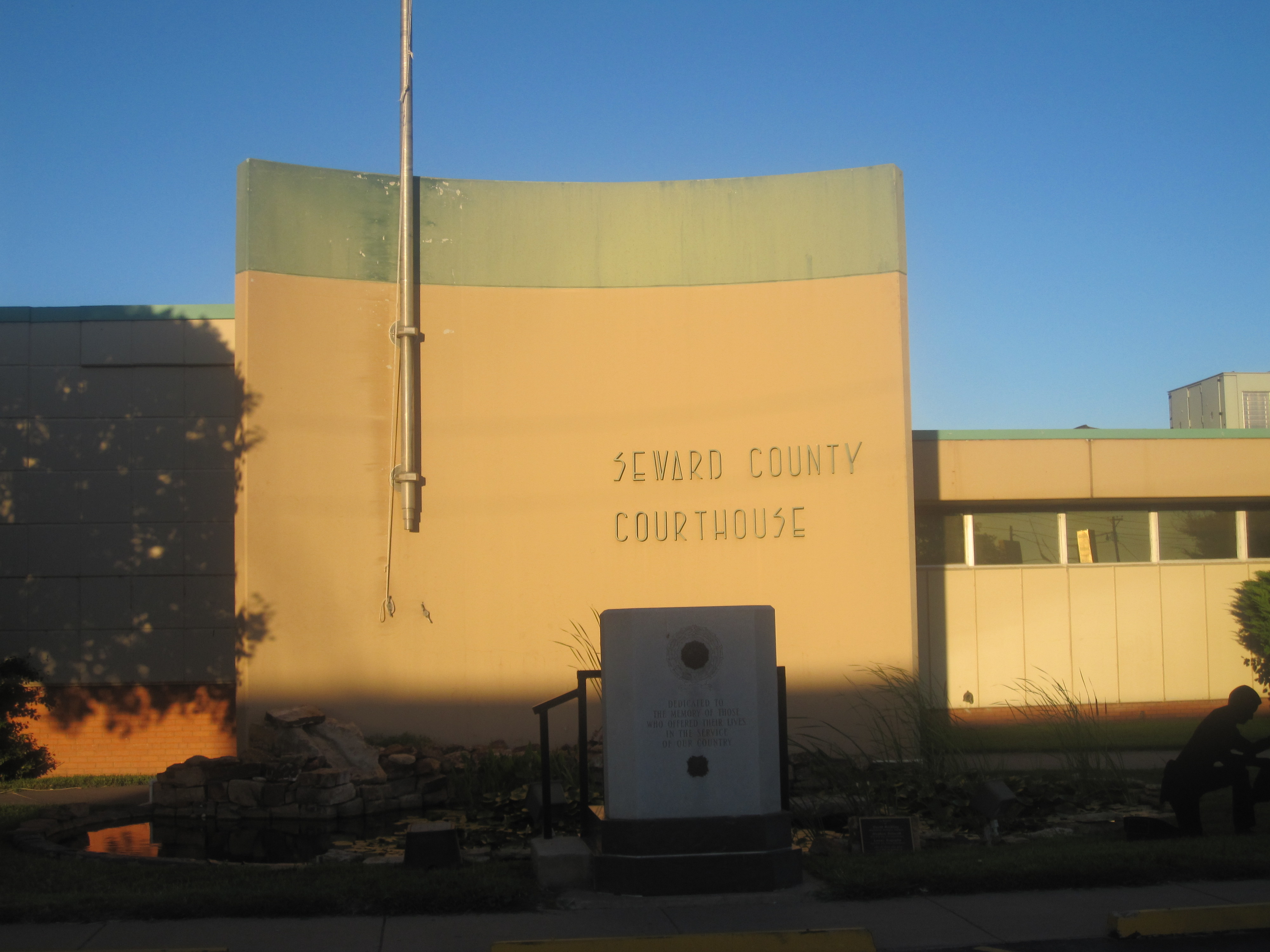
- Seward County Courthouse

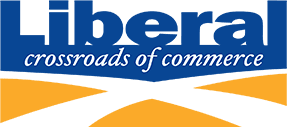
- Logo
- Motto: "Crossroads of Commerce"
- Location within Seward County and Kansas

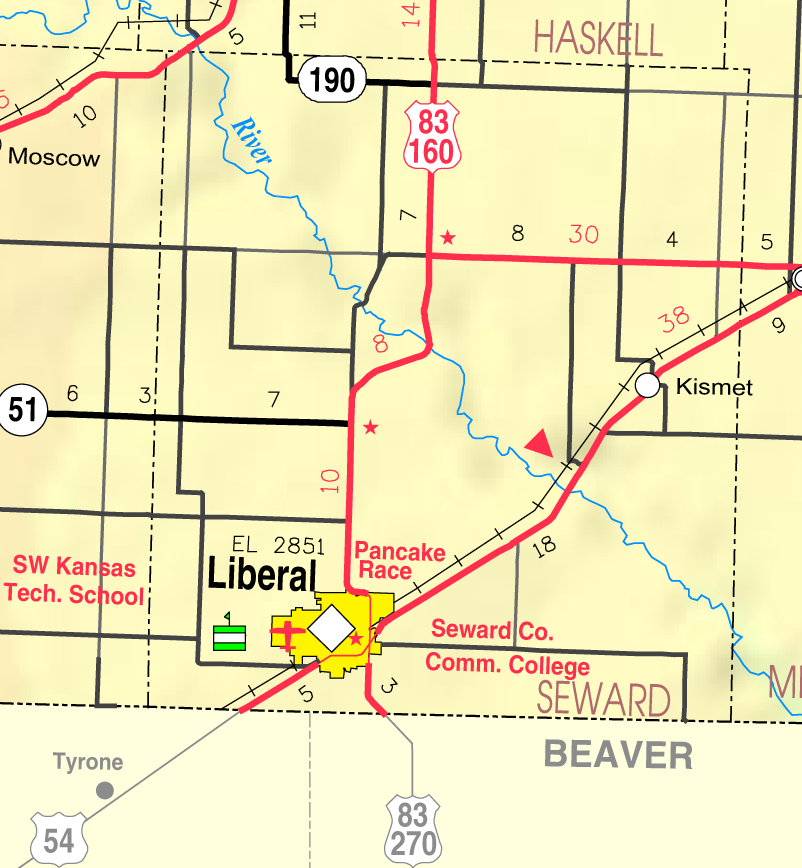
- KDOT map of Seward County (legend)
- Coordinates: 37°02′48″N 100°55′40″W
- Country: United States
- State: Kansas
- County: Seward
- Founded: 1888
- Incorporated: 1888

Government
  - Mayor: Jeff Parsons
  - City Manager: Scarlette Diseker

Area
  - Total: 11.65 sq mi (30.18 km^{2})
  - Land: 11.43 sq mi (29.60 km^{2})
  - Water: 0.22 sq mi (0.57 km^{2})
- Elevation: 2,848 ft (868 m)

Population (2020)
  - Total: 19,825
  - Density: 1,735/sq mi (669.8/km^{2})
- Time zone: UTC-6 (CST)
  - Summer (DST): UTC-5 (CDT)
- ZIP Codes: 67901, 67905
- Area code: 620
- FIPS code: 20-39825
- GNIS ID: 485613
- Website: cityofliberal.org

Liberal is a city in and the county seat of Seward County, Kansas, United States. As of 2024, the population of the city was 18,743. It is located in southwestern Kansas, along U.S. Route 54 highway, near the Kansas-Oklahoma state line. Liberal is the home of Seward County Community College.

== History ==
Early settler Seymour S. Rogers built the first house in what would become Liberal in 1872. Rogers became famous in the region for giving free water to thirsty travelers. Reportedly, Liberal gained its name from the common response to his acts of kindness, "That's very liberal of you." In 1885 Rogers built a general store, and with it came an official U.S. Post Office. Rogers named the post office 'Liberal'. After the railroad was built close by, a plan for the town site was created in 1888. A year later the population was around 800.

Drought caused some farmers to give up and look for more fertile territory; however, when the nearby Indian Territory was opened, more settlers headed to the cheap land that would become Oklahoma.

Natural gas was discovered west of town, in what would become part of the massive Panhandle-Hugoton Gas Field, in 1920. Oil was discovered southwest of town in 1951. In 1963 the largest helium plant in the world, National Helium, was opened.

== Geography ==
Liberal is located in southwestern Kansas at the intersection of U.S. routes 54 and 83. Liberal is 140 miles (225 km) north-northeast of Amarillo, Texas, 202 mi (325 km) west-southwest of Wichita, and 288 mi (463 km) southeast of Denver, Colorado.

The city lies approximately 10 miles (16 km) southwest of the Cimarron River in the High Plains region of the Great Plains.

According to the United States Census Bureau, the city has a total area of 11.75 square miles (30.43 km^{2}), of which 11.61 square miles (30.07 km^{2}) is land and 0.14 square miles (0.36 km^{2}) is water.

=== Climate ===
Liberal has a semi-arid steppe climate (Köppen BSk) characterized by hot, dry summers, cool, dry winters, and large diurnal temperature variation year-round; relative humidity averages 63%. On average, January is the coldest month, July is the hottest month, February is the driest month and June is the wettest month.

The high temperature reaches or exceeds 90 °F (32 °C) an average of 80.1 days a year and 100 °F (38 °C) an average of 16.5 days. The minimum temperature falls to or below 0 °F (−17.8 °C) on an average of 1.6 days a year. The highest temperature recorded in Liberal was 114 °F (45.6 °C) on June 10, 1981; the coldest temperature recorded was −20 °F (−28.9 °C) on February 27, 1930.

Climate data for Liberal, Kansas, 1991–2020 normals, extremes 1893–present
Month	Jan	Feb	Mar	Apr	May	Jun	Jul	Aug	Sep	Oct	Nov	Dec	Year
Record high °F (°C)	85 (29)	90 (32)	102 (39)	103 (39)	106 (41)	114 (46)	113 (45)	111 (44)	108 (42)	99 (37)	90 (32)	85 (29)	114 (46)
Mean maximum °F (°C)	71.2 (21.8)	77.2 (25.1)	85.2 (29.6)	90.8 (32.7)	96.6 (35.9)	101.7 (38.7)	104.5 (40.3)	101.8 (38.8)	99.2 (37.3)	93.0 (33.9)	79.8 (26.6)	70.6 (21.4)	105.6 (40.9)
Mean daily maximum °F (°C)	47.6 (8.7)	51.0 (10.6)	60.7 (15.9)	69.6 (20.9)	78.7 (25.9)	88.8 (31.6)	93.2 (34.0)	91.2 (32.9)	83.9 (28.8)	71.5 (21.9)	58.3 (14.6)	47.4 (8.6)	70.2 (21.2)
Daily mean °F (°C)	33.7 (0.9)	36.6 (2.6)	45.5 (7.5)	54.2 (12.3)	64.2 (17.9)	74.6 (23.7)	79.1 (26.2)	77.4 (25.2)	69.5 (20.8)	56.8 (13.8)	43.4 (6.3)	34.1 (1.2)	55.8 (13.2)
Mean daily minimum °F (°C)	19.7 (−6.8)	22.2 (−5.4)	30.3 (−0.9)	38.7 (3.7)	49.8 (9.9)	60.3 (15.7)	65.1 (18.4)	63.6 (17.6)	55.0 (12.8)	42.2 (5.7)	28.6 (−1.9)	20.8 (−6.2)	41.4 (5.2)
Mean minimum °F (°C)	5.5 (−14.7)	9.0 (−12.8)	14.7 (−9.6)	26.0 (−3.3)	37.7 (3.2)	50.9 (10.5)	57.9 (14.4)	57.0 (13.9)	42.3 (5.7)	27.5 (−2.5)	14.1 (−9.9)	6.4 (−14.2)	0.1 (−17.7)
Record low °F (°C)	−19 (−28)	−20 (−29)	−12 (−24)	10 (−12)	20 (−7)	38 (3)	48 (9)	40 (4)	29 (−2)	8 (−13)	−2 (−19)	−15 (−26)	−20 (−29)
Average precipitation inches (mm)	0.47 (12)	0.40 (10)	1.20 (30)	1.80 (46)	2.66 (68)	3.31 (84)	3.20 (81)	2.72 (69)	1.53 (39)	2.29 (58)	0.73 (19)	0.80 (20)	21.11 (536)
Average snowfall inches (cm)	3.5 (8.9)	1.8 (4.6)	2.3 (5.8)	0.4 (1.0)	0.1 (0.25)	0.0 (0.0)	0.0 (0.0)	0.0 (0.0)	0.0 (0.0)	0.7 (1.8)	1.0 (2.5)	4.6 (12)	14.4 (36.85)
Average precipitation days (≥ 0.01 in)	2.2	2.3	3.8	5.1	6.1	6.8	7.0	6.5	4.1	3.8	2.7	2.8	53.2
Average snowy days (≥ 0.1 in)	1.7	1.4	1.1	0.2	0.0	0.0	0.0	0.0	0.0	0.3	0.5	1.6	6.8
Source 1: NOAA
Source 2: National Weather Service

== Demographics ==
Historical population
Census	Pop.	Note	%±
1900	426		—
1910	1,716		302.8%
1920	3,613		110.5%
1930	5,294		46.5%
1940	4,410		−16.7%
1950	7,134		61.8%
1960	13,813		93.6%
1970	13,862		0.4%
1980	14,911		7.6%
1990	16,573		11.1%
2000	19,666		18.7%
2010	20,525		4.4%
2020	19,825		−3.4%
2025 (est.)	19,010		−4.1%
U.S. Decennial Census; 2010–2020

=== 2020 census ===
As of the 2020 census, Liberal had a population of 19,825 with 6,618 households and 4,771 families. The population density was 1,734.5 per square mile (669.7/km^{2}). There were 7,389 housing units at an average density of 646.5 per square mile (249.6/km^{2}).

30.9% of residents were under the age of 18, 11.2% were from 18 to 24, 27.0% were from 25 to 44, 21.0% were from 45 to 64, and 9.9% were 65 years of age or older. The median age was 30.3 years. For every 100 females there were 98.3 males, and for every 100 females age 18 and over there were 101.8 males.

Of the 6,618 households, 44.7% had children under the age of 18 living in them. Of all households, 48.4% were married-couple households, 19.1% were households with a male householder and no spouse or partner present, and 25.5% were households with a female householder and no spouse or partner present. About 23.2% of households were made up of individuals and 8.1% had someone living alone who was 65 years of age or older. The average household size was 2.9 and the average family size was 3.5.

There were 7,389 housing units, of which 10.4% were vacant. The homeowner vacancy rate was 1.9% and the rental vacancy rate was 11.6%.

99.9% of residents lived in urban areas, while 0.1% lived in rural areas.

Racial composition as of the 2020 census
Race	Number	Percent
White	7,690	38.8%
Black or African American	657	3.3%
American Indian and Alaska Native	489	2.5%
Asian	514	2.6%
Native Hawaiian and Other Pacific Islander	6	0.0%
Some other race	5,714	28.8%
Two or more races	4,755	24.0%
Hispanic or Latino (of any race)	13,499	68.1%

2016–2020 American Community Survey estimates

An estimated 6.6% of residents had a bachelor's degree or higher. The 2016–2020 5-year American Community Survey estimates show that the median household income was $48,434 (with a margin of error of +/- $3,385) and the median family income was $54,167 (+/- $9,562). Males had a median income of $34,371 (+/- $2,664) versus $26,005 (+/- $1,722) for females, and the median income for those above 16 years old was $30,586 (+/- $1,873). Approximately 10.1% of families and 13.8% of the population were below the poverty line, including 18.5% of those under the age of 18 and 9.2% of those ages 65 or over.

=== 2010 census ===
As of the 2010 census, there were 20,525 people, 6,623 households, and 4,838 families residing in the city. The population density was 1,832.6 inhabitants per square mile (707.6/km^{2}). There were 7,118 housing units at an average density of 641.3 per square mile (247.6/km^{2}). The racial makeup of the city was 68.6% White, 3.7% African American, 2.9% Asian, 0.8% American Indian, 0.2% Pacific Islander, 20.6% from other races, and 3.2% from two or more races. Hispanics and Latinos of any race made up 58.7% of the population.

There were 6,623 households, of which 42.3% had children under the age of 18 living with them, 52.7% were married couples living together, 7.1% had a male householder with no wife present, 13.2% had a female householder with no husband present, and 27.0% were non-families. 21.7% of all households were made up of individuals, and 7.5% had someone living alone who was 65 years of age or older. The average household size was 3.03, and the average family size was 3.54.

The median age was 28.4 years. 32.1% of residents were under the age of 18; 12.4% were between the ages of 18 and 24; 27.8% were from 25 to 44; 19.4% were from 45 to 64; and 8.3% were 65 years of age or older. The gender makeup of the city population was 51.4% male and 48.6% female.

The median income for a household in the city was $40,247, and the median income for a family was $44,167. Males had a median income of $31,435 versus $25,208 for females. The per capita income for the city was $17,668. About 15.3% of families and 17.8% of the population were below the poverty line, including 23.6% of those under age 18 and 8.2% of those age 65 or over.

== Economy ==
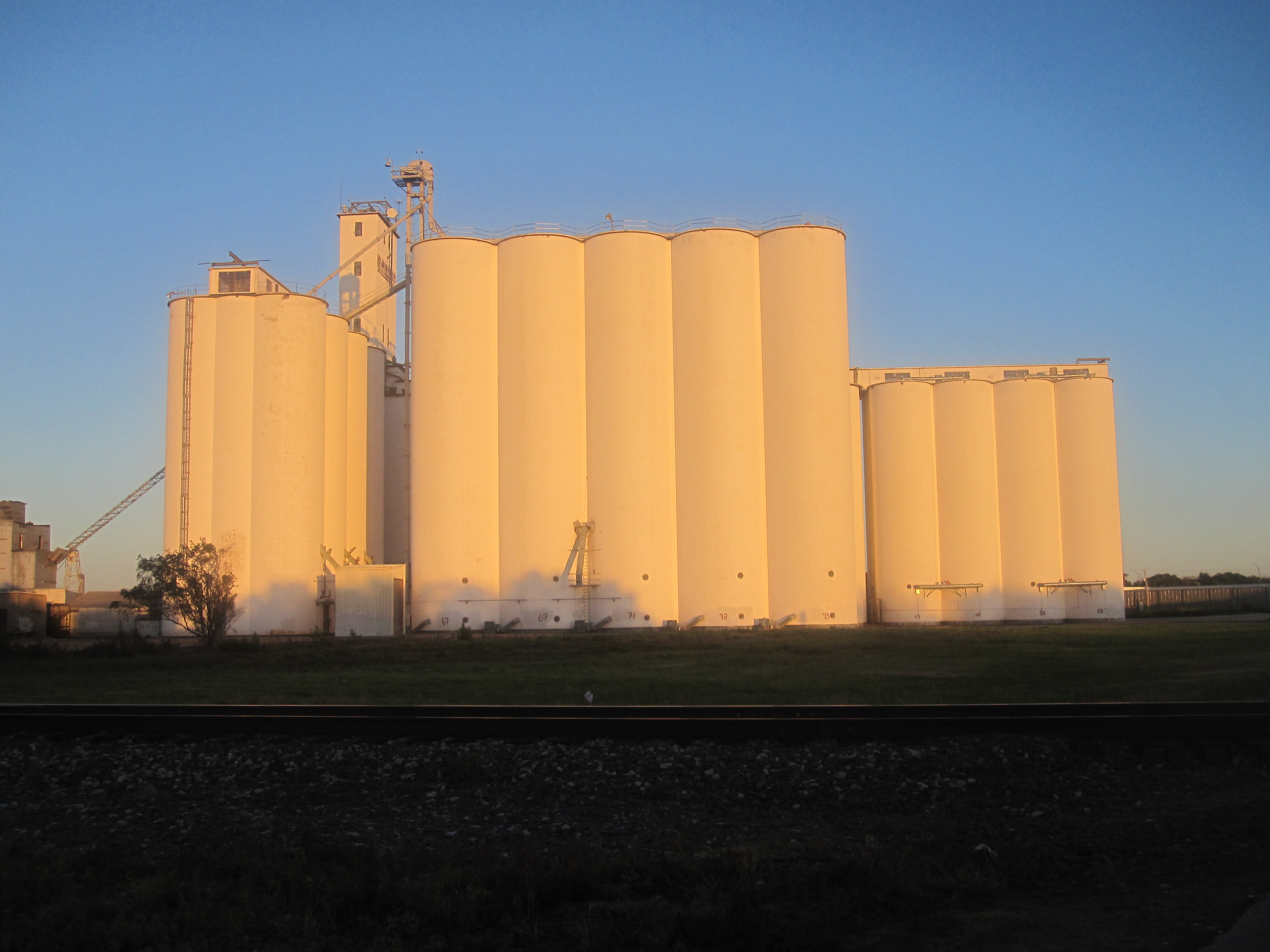
Grain elevator in Liberal (2010)

Energy and agriculture are the main economic drivers of the area. Natural resources include oil, natural gas, water, gravel and sand. The beef industry (ranches, feed lots and packing plants) is Liberal's largest source of employment. Hard winter wheat, corn, milo, alfalfa and cotton are common crops. Trucking is a major industry. Dairies and pork processors are a growing business.

As of 2012, 70.2% of the population over the age of 16 was in the labor force. 0.0% was in the armed forces, and 70.2% was in the civilian labor force with 63.4% being employed and 6.9% unemployed. The composition, by occupation, of the employed civilian labor force was: 28.5% in production, transportation, and material moving; 20.0% in natural resources, construction, and maintenance; 19.9% in sales and office occupations; 18.9% in management, business, science, and arts; and 12.6% in service occupations. The three industries employing the largest percentages of the working civilian labor force were: manufacturing (24.4%); educational services, health care, and social assistance (19.4%); and retail trade (10.5%).

The cost of living in Liberal is relatively low; compared to a U.S. average of 100, the cost of living index for the city is 80.8. As of 2012, the median home value in the city was $85,600, the median selected monthly owner cost was $961 for housing units with a mortgage and $383 for those without, and the median gross rent was $648.

=== Top employers ===
According to Liberal's 2011 Comprehensive Annual Financial Report, the top 10 employers in the city are:

#	Employer	Employees
1	National Beef Packing Company	3,500
2	Liberal USD 480	800
3	Seward County Community College	450
4	Southwest Medical Center	425
5	Walmart Stores	350
6	Seaboard Foods	275
7	Seward County	200
8	City of Liberal	200
9	National Carriers	200
10	Panhandle Oilfield Services	175

== Arts and culture ==
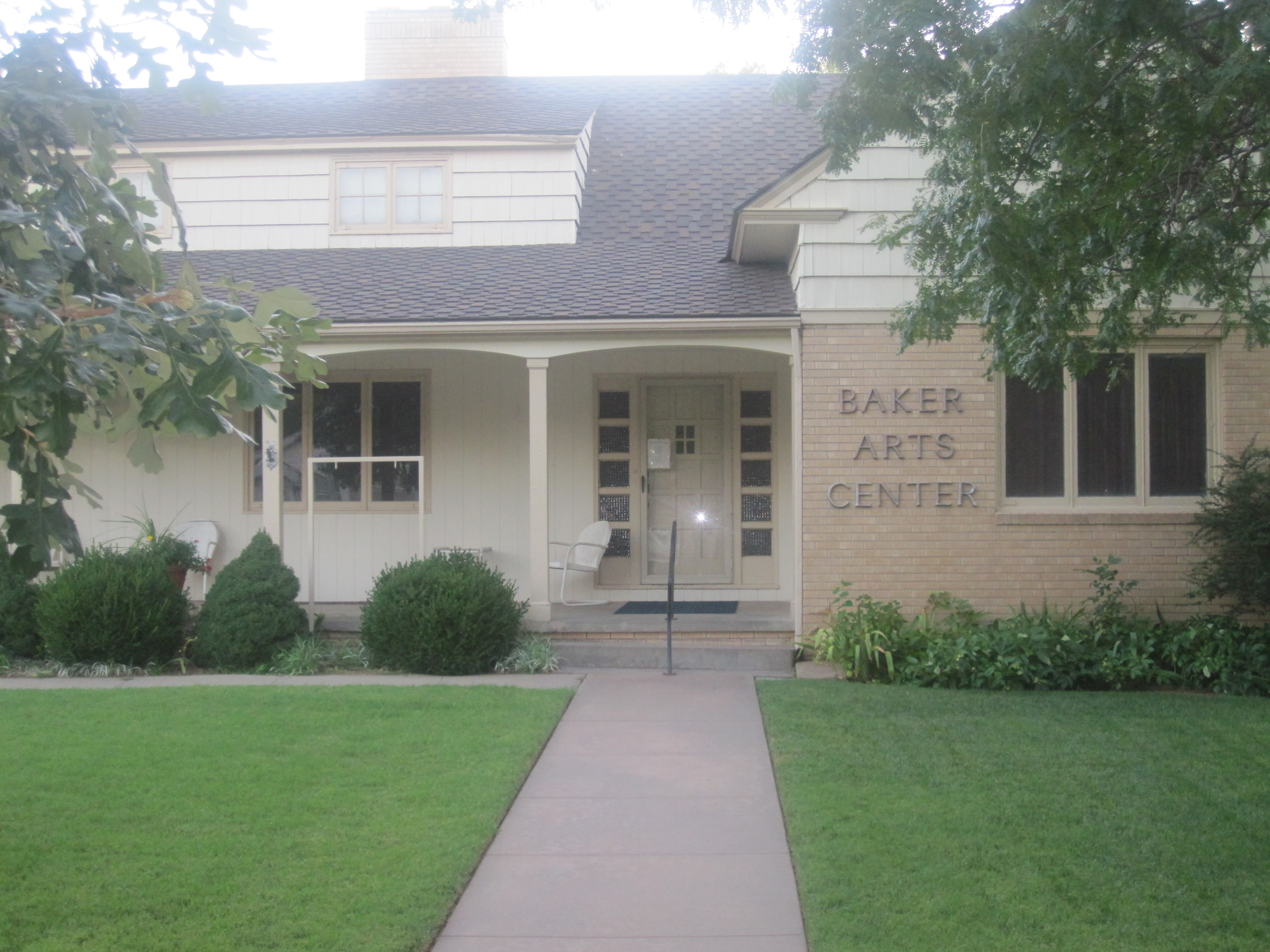
Baker Arts Center

=== Events ===
Liberal is famous for its annual Pancake Day race that is held in competition with the town of Olney, United Kingdom for the fastest time between both cities.

=== Points of interest ===
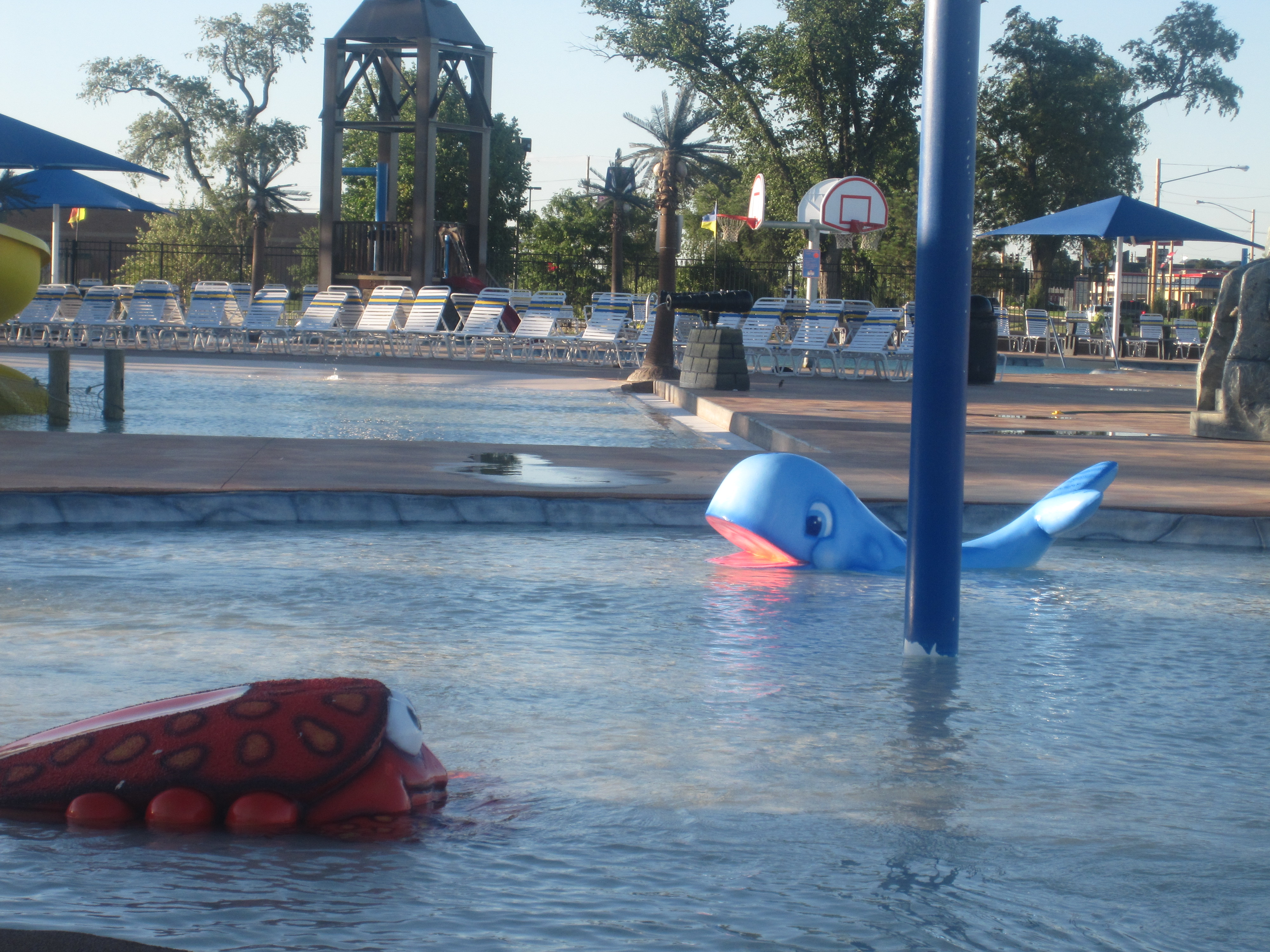
Liberal's Adventure Bay water park in 2010

Liberal has a water park known as Adventure Bay.

The fifth largest collection of civilian and military aircraft in the United States is located at the Mid-America Air Museum. Started with a gift of fifty planes by General Tom (Thomas) Welch Jr., the museum has more than one hundred aircraft.

The Coronado Museum has items from the Native Americans that lived in the area, as well as items from Francisco Vásquez de Coronado's expedition to the area in 1541, and the history of farming and ranching in the county in more recent times.

Liberal is home to "The Land of Oz" exhibit from The Wizard of Oz, a recreation of Dorothy Gale's house and the famed Yellow Brick Road, featuring donated bricks bearing the names of former U.S. Senator Bob Dole, Ronald and Nancy Reagan, and Liza Minnelli (Judy Garland's daughter). This exhibit was originally designed and displayed for Topeka in 1981, but relocated here eleven years later by its creator Linda Windler.

Liberal Memorial Library is located on North Kansas Avenue between Fifth and Sixth Streets in Cooper Park. The Book Front entrance was completed in April 1955 and designed by the building's architect George L. Pitcher. Wheeler Williams, a sculptor from New York, signed an agreement in October 1960 to mold the "Pioneer Mother of Kansas." This six foot statue, sponsored by Mr. and Mrs. D. K. Baty, was to be erected in Cooper Park on Memorial Day, May 30, 1961. It was placed opposite of the "Statue of Liberty," which was donated and placed in Cooper Park by the Boy Scouts of America.

== Sports ==
The Liberal Bee Jays, a semi-professional baseball team, have won five national championships and 13 state championships. The Bee Jays have been coached by three major league managers and have sent 165 players to the major leagues.

== Government ==
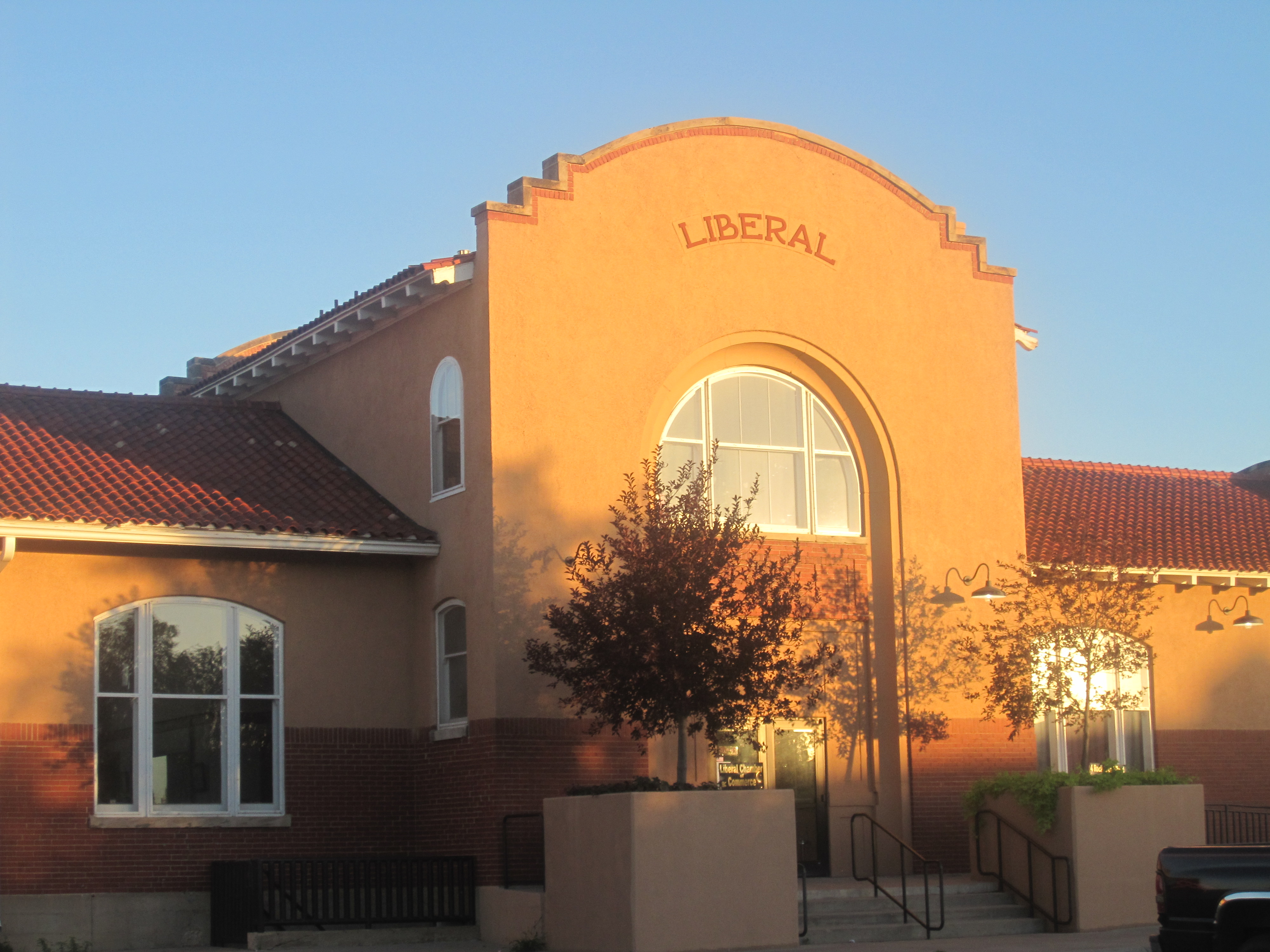
Chamber of Commerce

Liberal has a commission-manager government with a city commission consisting of five members elected at-large. Elections occur every two years in the odd numbered year, and commissioners serve two-year or four-year terms depending on the number of votes they receive. Each year, the commission appoints a member to serve as mayor and another to serve as vice-mayor. The city manager heads the city administration.

== Education ==
=== Colleges ===
- Seward County Community College

=== Primary and secondary ===
The community is served by Liberal USD 480 public school district, which operates twelve schools in the city:

- Bright Start Pre-K Center (Pre-K)
- Cottonwood Elementary School (K–5)
- MacArthur Elementary School (K–5)
- Meadowlark Elementary School (K–5)
- Prairie View Elementary School (K–5)
- Sunflower Intermediate School (K–5)
- Eisenhower Middle School (6–8)
- Seymour Rogers Middle School (6–8)
- Liberal High School (9–12)

There is also a Christian school in Liberal: Fellowship Baptist School (K–12).

== Media ==
Four newspapers are published in Liberal. The Leader & Times is the city's main daily newspaper, published six days a week. It is the result of the merger between the city's two previous dailies, the High Plains Daily Leader and the Southwest Daily Times. The publisher of the Leader & Times also prints a weekly Spanish language paper, El Lider. Seward County Community College publishes a bi-weekly student newspaper, the Crusader. The fourth paper is the Liberal Light, published weekly.

Liberal is a center of broadcast media for southwest Kansas and the Oklahoma Panhandle. Two AM and seven FM radio stations are licensed to and broadcast from the city. Liberal is in the Wichita-Hutchinson, Kansas television market, and one television station broadcasts from the city: KSWE-LD, a sister station of KDGL-LD in Sublette, Kansas.

On cable, viewers can receive stations from the Wichita/Hutchinson market (via semi-satellite stations in Garden City/Ensign), PBS' Tulsa affiliate, KOED, as well as Amarillo, Texas's CBS affiliate, KFDA-TV.

== Infrastructure ==
=== Transportation ===
U.S. Route 83 runs north–south along the east side of the city, intersecting U.S. Route 54 which runs northeast–southwest. In addition, Liberal is the western terminus of U.S. Route 270 which runs concurrently with U.S. 83 south from the city.

Liberal Mid-America Regional Airport is immediately west of the city. Publicly owned, it has two operative paved runways and is used primarily for general aviation. United Express provides airline service with daily flights to Denver.

The Tucumcari Line of the Union Pacific Railroad runs parallel to U.S. 54 northeast–southwest through the city.

The City Bus provides fixed-route and dial-a-ride transit services Monday through Friday.

== Notable people ==
Notable individuals who were born in and/or have lived in Liberal include:

- Wayne Angell (1940–2025), economist
- Chris Brown (born 1974), college football coach
- Lamar Chapman (born 1976), NFL and CFL player
- Wantha Davis (1917–2012), horse racing jockey
- Kasey Hayes (born 1985), professional bull rider
- Kristin Key (born 1980), comedian
- Shalee Lehning (born 1986), Women's National Basketball Association guard
- M. C. Leist (1942–2022), Oklahoma state legislator
- Martin Lewis (born 1975), National Basketball Association forward
- Kelli McCarty (born 1969), 1991 Miss Kansas USA and Miss USA, actress
- Jerrod Niemann (born 1979), country music singer/songwriter
- Kelly Overton, animal rights activist and author
- Melvin Sanders (born 1981), professional basketball guard/forward
- William Stafford (1914–1993), poet
- Doug Terry (born 1968), National Football League defensive back
- Dallas Trahern (born 1985), Major League Baseball pitcher
- Jerame Tuman (born 1976), National Football League tight end
- Larry D. Welch (born 1934), U.S. Air Force General

== In popular culture ==
- B. H. Fairchild wrote the poem, "At the Excavation of Liberal, Kansas" (in: The Art of the Lathe, Alice James Books, 1998), in memory of William Stafford; it contains Stafford's poem, "What I Heard Whispered at the Edge of Liberal, Kansas" (from: Stories That Could Be True: New and Collected Poems, Harper and Row, 1977).
- In the film National Lampoon's Vacation, Clark W. Griswold suggests altering the family's route of travel in order to visit Liberal so they can see the world's largest house of mud. The idea is rejected by his wife, Ellen, in favor of getting to her cousin Eddie's home.
- Season 4, Episode 9 of Fargo is set in Liberal.
