= Liberal City Bus =

Provider of mass transportation in Seward County, Kansas

- Headquarters: 324 N Kansas Avenue
- Locale: Liberal, Kansas
- Service area: Seward County, Kansas
- Service type: Bus service, paratransit
- Routes: 3
- Hubs: City Hall
- Fleet: 3 buses
- Annual ridership: 29,637 (2019)
- Website: Liberal City Bus

City Bus is the primary provider of mass transportation in Liberal, Kansas with three routes serving the region. As of 2019, the system provided 29,637 rides over 11,133 annual vehicle revenue hours with 3 buses and 2 paratransit vehicles.

== History ==
Fixed route transit service in Liberal began on September 17, 2012, with the inauguration of the City Bus. Within 12 days, the service reached 1,000 passengers and the 10,000 ride was provided on March 29, 2013.

== Service ==
City Bus operates three regular weekday bus routes on a pulse system with all routes departing City Hall on the hour.

Hours of operation for the system are Monday through Friday from 6:00 A.M. to 6:00 P.M. There is no service on Saturdays and Sundays. Regular fares are $1.00.

=== Routes ===
- Blue Route
- Red Route
- Orange Route

== Fixed route ridership ==
The ridership statistics shown here are of fixed route services only and do not include demand response services.

== See also ==
- List of bus transit systems in the United States
- Finney County Transit
