= Liberal USD 480 =

Public school district in Liberal, Kansas

Address
- 7 W Parkway Blvd. Liberal, Seward, Kansas, 67901; United States
- Coordinates: 37.0419°N 100.9220°W

District information
- Type: Public
- Grades: PK to 12
- Superintendent: Dane Richardson
- Asst. superintendent(s): Jarod Bellar; Maria Gomez-Rocque
- School board: Jesus Baeza; Mike Brack; Nick Hatcher; Kaylee Lopez; Luz Riggs
- Chair of the board: Bradley Carr
- Schools: 9
- NCES District ID: 2008730
- District ID: KS-D0480

Students and staff
- Students: 4,654 students as of 2026
- Teachers: 333.83 (FTE)
- Student–teacher ratio: 13.94
- Athletic conference: Western Athletic Conference
- Colors: Red; Black

Other information
- Website: usd480.net

Liberal USD 480 is a public unified school district headquartered in Liberal, Kansas, United States. The district includes the communities of Liberal and nearby rural areas.

== Schools ==
The school district operates the following schools:

- Liberal High School
- Eisenhower Middle School
- Seymour Rogers Middle School
- Cottonwood Elementary School
- MacArthur Elementary School
- Meadowlark Elementary School
- Prairie View Elementary School
- Sunflower Elementary School
- Bright Start PreK Center

== See also ==
- Kansas State Department of Education
- Kansas State High School Activities Association
- List of high schools in Kansas
- List of unified school districts in Kansas
