= 1995 NBA draft =

Basketball player selection

General information
- Sport: Basketball
- Date: June 28, 1995
- Location: SkyDome (Toronto, Ontario)
- Networks: TNT, YTV

Overview
- 58 total selections in 2 rounds
- League: NBA
- First selection: Joe Smith (Golden State Warriors)
- Hall of Famers: 1: PF Kevin Garnett

The 1995 NBA draft took place on June 28, 1995, at SkyDome in Toronto, Ontario, Canada. It marked the first NBA draft to be held outside the United States and was the first draft for the two Canadian expansion teams that were added for 1995–96 season, the Toronto Raptors and Vancouver Grizzlies (who relocated to Memphis in 2001). Kevin Garnett, who was taken fifth in this draft, is notable for being the first player in two decades to be selected straight out of high school (which would become more common over the next ten drafts until the age requirement was increased to 19 years old in 2005 creating the one-and-done player). Garnett ultimately gathered fifteen All Star selections (Garnett was the first Minnesota Timberwolf to play in an NBA All-Star Game), nine All-NBA selections (four of those being First-Teams), one NBA MVP award, and multiple other accolades. Rasheed Wallace and Jerry Stackhouse also had successful careers, being four-time and two-time All-Stars respectively. Wallace won an NBA championship in 2004 with the Detroit Pistons, while Stackhouse scored the most total points in the league in 2000, also with the Pistons.

The other remaining top selections had relatively productive careers, but were considered to have never reached their full potential. Joe Smith put up solid, but unspectacular numbers throughout his career and is generally considered a disappointment for a first overall selection. He was also involved in a salary cap scandal with the Minnesota Timberwolves. Antonio McDyess was a one-time All-Star, but serious and continuing knee injuries decreased much of his effectiveness in the prime of his career. Damon Stoudamire was the 1995–96 NBA Rookie of the Year and had a solid career although he was arrested, suspended and fined several times for marijuana possession. Bryant Reeves impressed early in his career but a season after being granted a six-year, $61.8 million contract extension, his numbers went down due to weight and back problems and he retired after only playing six NBA seasons, all with the Vancouver Grizzlies.

This draft was also notable for two storied NCAA players who failed to meet lofty expectations in the NBA, Ed O'Bannon and Shawn Respert. O'Bannon had received national accolades for leading the UCLA Bruins to the NCAA Championship, but only played two years in the NBA. Respert played only four seasons in the NBA, while secretly hiding that he was suffering from stomach cancer.

The Vancouver Grizzlies and the Toronto Raptors were not able to win the NBA draft lottery, due to pre-negotiated rules. This was extended into the 1997–1998 season.

== Draft ==
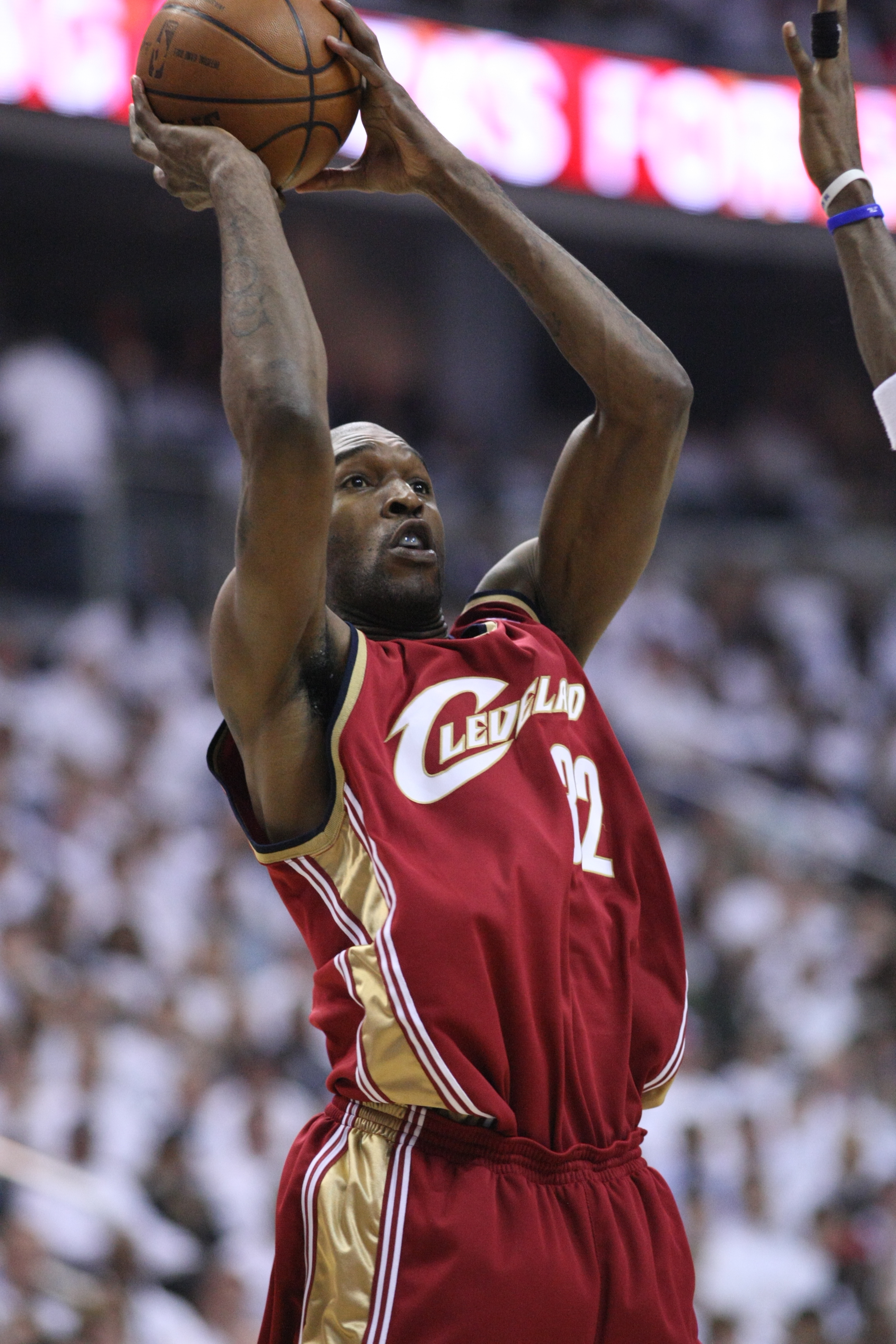
Joe Smith was selected first overall by the Golden State Warriors

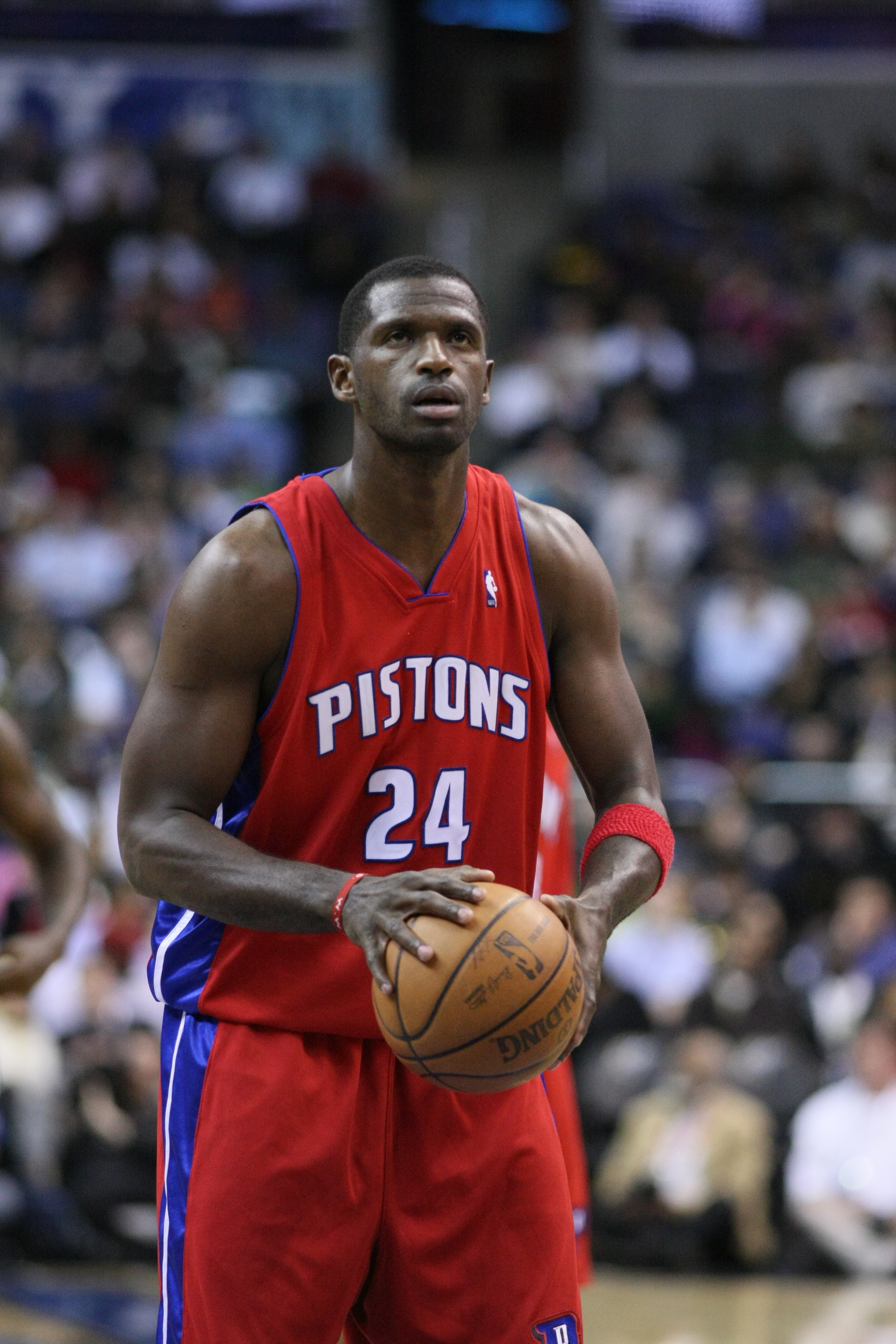
Antonio McDyess was selected 2nd overall by the Los Angeles Clippers (traded to the Denver Nuggets).

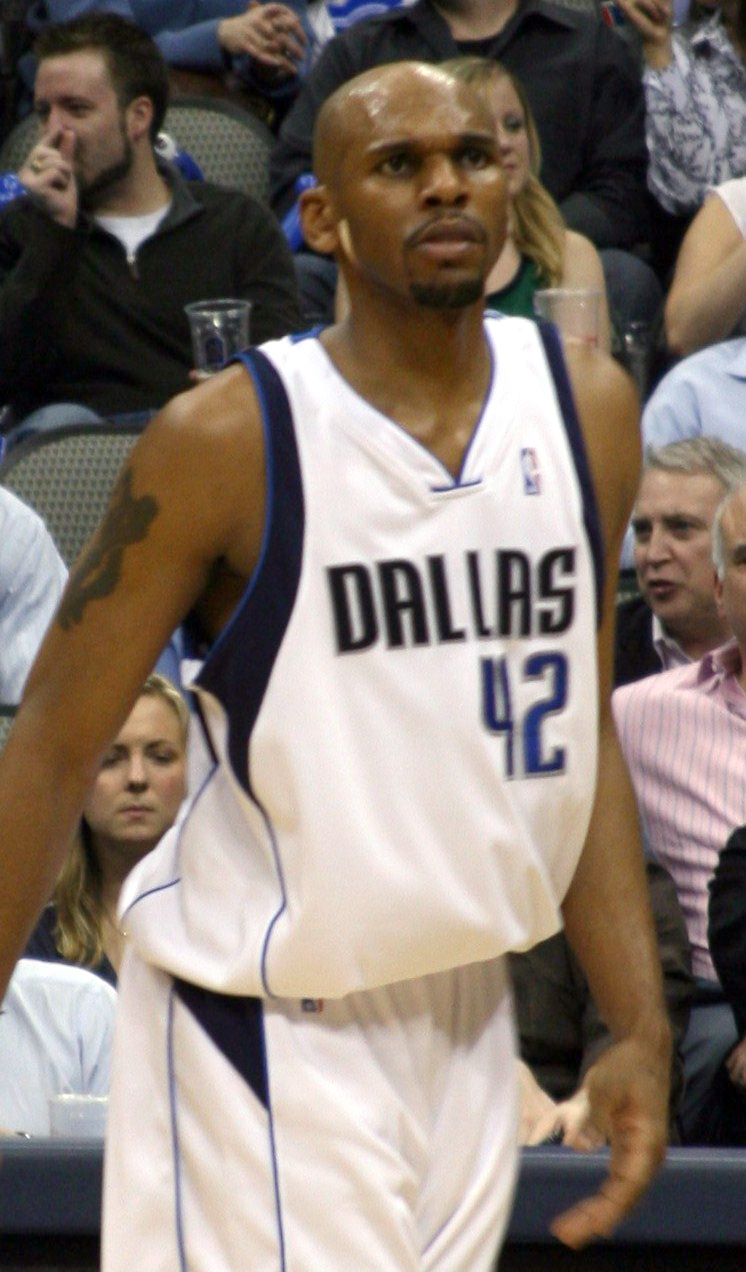
Jerry Stackhouse was selected 3rd overall by the Philadelphia 76ers.

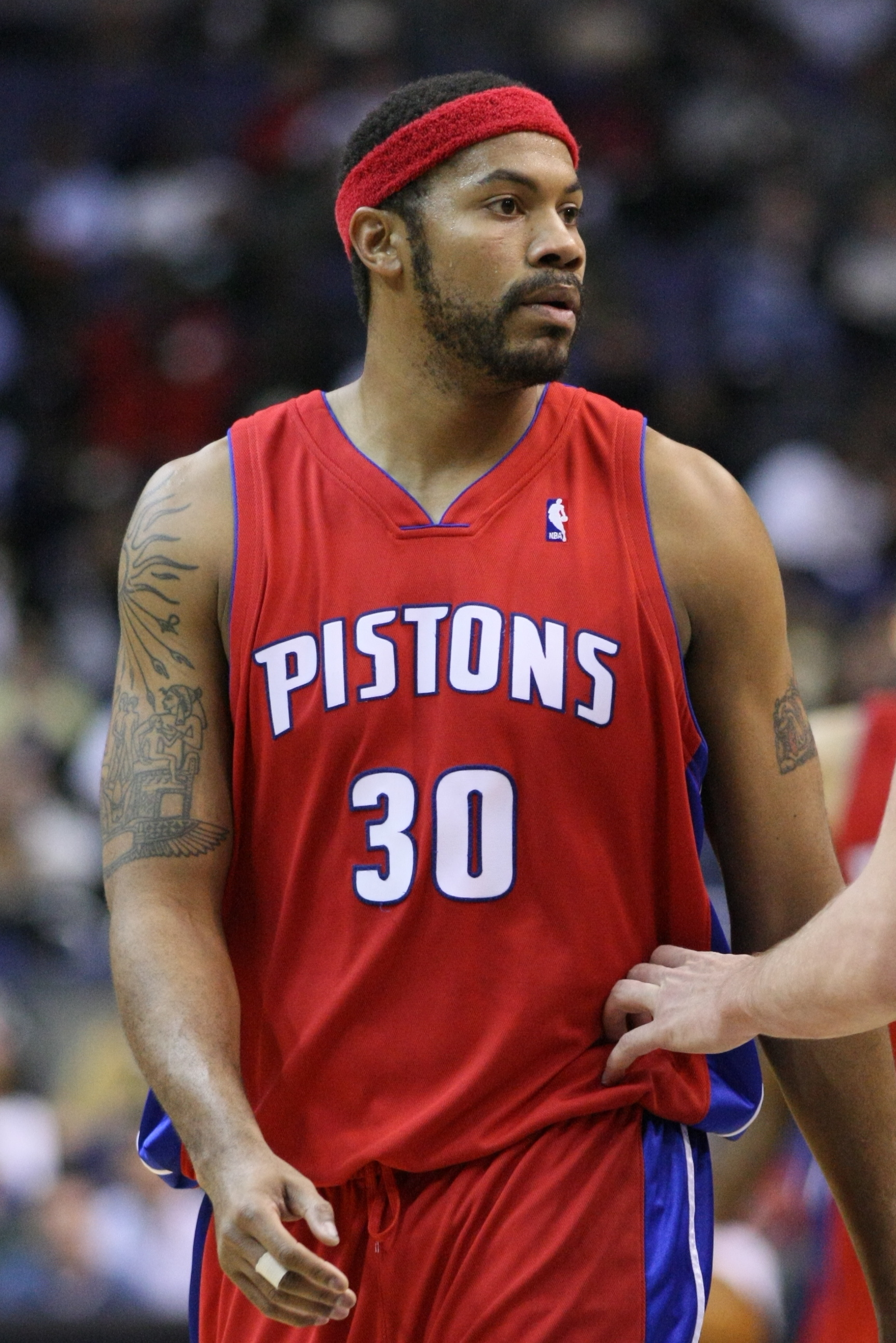
Rasheed Wallace was selected 4th overall by the Washington Bullets.

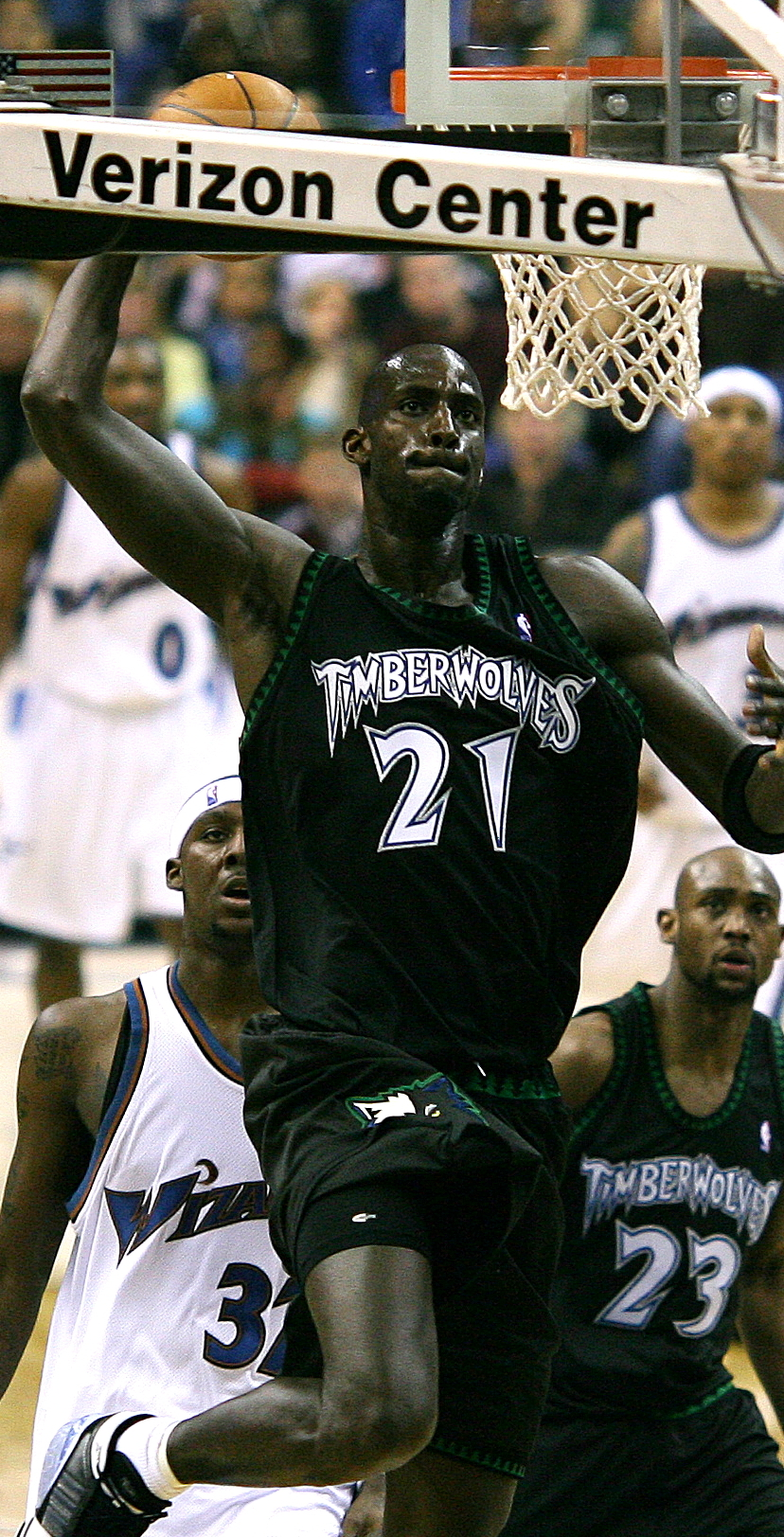
Kevin Garnett was selected 5th overall by the Minnesota Timberwolves.

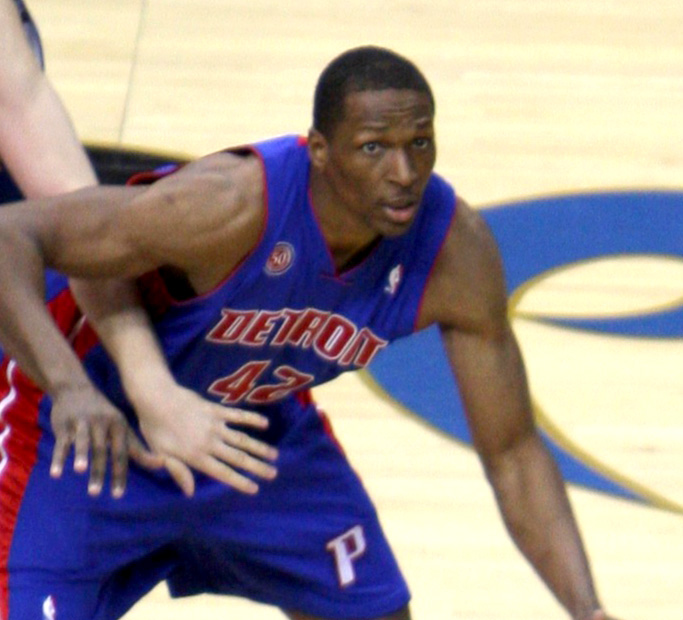
Theo Ratliff was selected 18th overall by the Detroit Pistons.

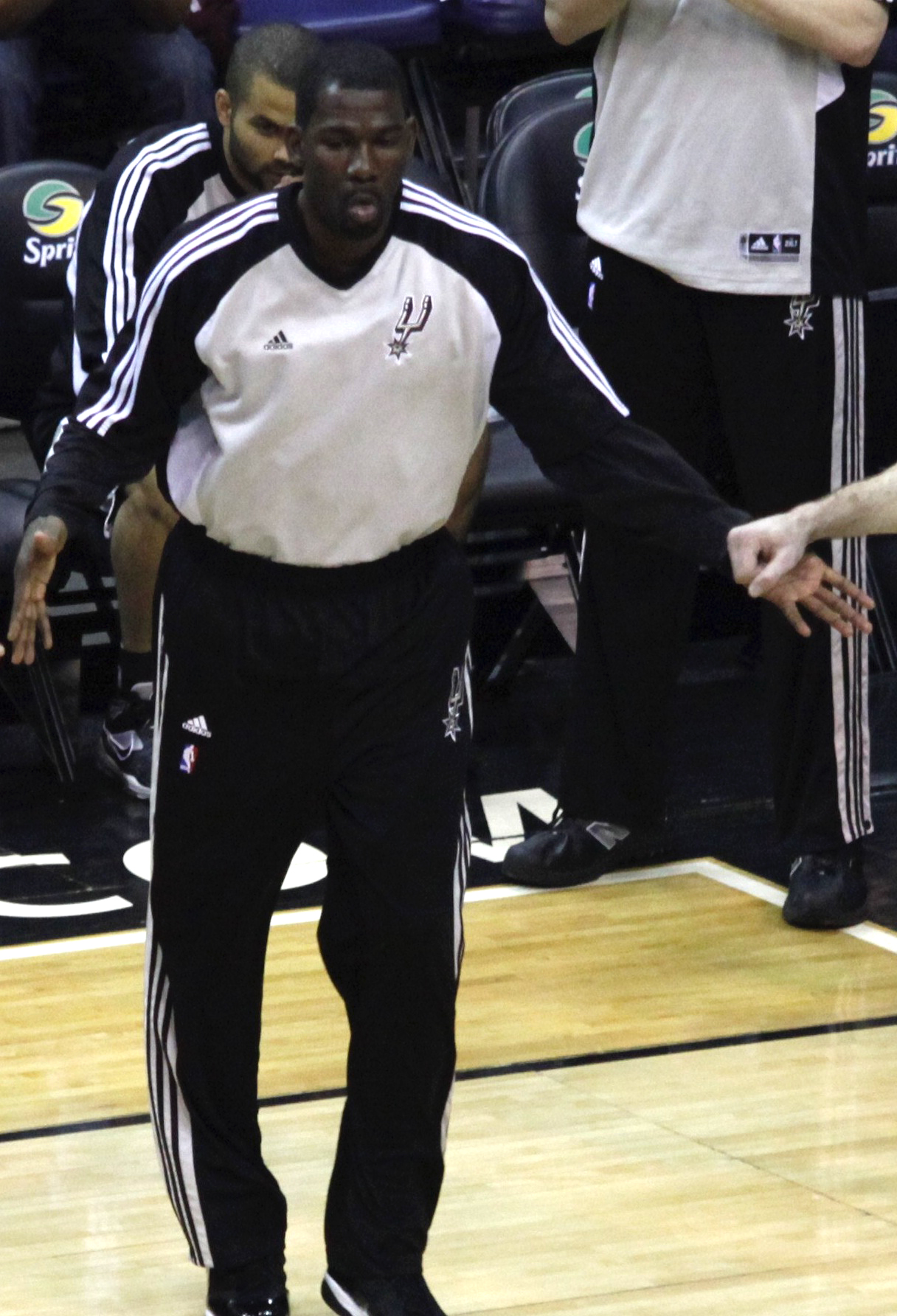
Michael Finley was selected 21st overall by the Phoenix Suns.

G	Guard	PG	Point guard	SG	Shooting guard	F	Forward	SF	Small forward	PF	Power forward	C	Center

^	Denotes player who has been inducted to the Naismith Memorial Basketball Hall of Fame
*	Denotes player who has been selected for at least one All-Star Game and All-NBA Team
^{+}	Denotes player who has been selected for at least one All-Star Game
^{#}	Denotes player who has never appeared in an NBA regular-season or playoff game
^{~}	Denotes player who has been selected as Rookie of the Year

Round	Pick	Player	Position	Nationality (Note: Nationality indicates the player's national team or representative nationality. If a player has not competed at the international level, then the nationality indicates the national team which the player is eligible to represent according to FIBA rules.)	NBA Team	School/Club team
1	1	Joe Smith	PF	United States	Golden State Warriors	Maryland (So.)
1	2	Antonio McDyess*	PF	United States	Los Angeles Clippers (traded to Denver)^{[a]}	Alabama (So.)
1	3	Jerry Stackhouse^{+}	SF/SG	United States	Philadelphia 76ers	North Carolina (So.)
1	4	Rasheed Wallace^{+}	PF/C	United States	Washington Bullets	North Carolina (So.)
1	5	Kevin Garnett^	PF	United States	Minnesota Timberwolves	Farragut Academy HS (Chicago)
1	6	Bryant Reeves	C	United States	Vancouver Grizzlies	Oklahoma State (Sr.)
1	7	Damon Stoudamire~	PG	United States	Toronto Raptors	Arizona (Sr.)
1	8	Shawn Respert	SG	United States	Portland Trail Blazers (from Detroit, traded to Milwaukee)	Michigan State (Sr.)
1	9	Ed O'Bannon	SF	United States	New Jersey Nets	UCLA (Sr.)
1	10	Kurt Thomas	PF/C	United States	Miami Heat	TCU (Sr.)
1	11	Gary Trent	PF	United States	Milwaukee Bucks (traded to Portland)	Ohio (Jr.)
1	12	Cherokee Parks	C	United States	Dallas Mavericks	Duke (Sr.)
1	13	Corliss Williamson	PF	United States	Sacramento Kings	Arkansas (Jr.)
1	14	Eric Williams	SF	United States	Boston Celtics	Providence (Sr.)
1	15	Brent Barry	SG	United States	Denver Nuggets (traded to L.A. Clippers)^{[a]}	Oregon State (Sr.)
1	16	Alan Henderson	PF	United States	Atlanta Hawks	Indiana (Sr.)
1	17	Bob Sura	SG	United States	Cleveland Cavaliers	Florida State (Sr.)
1	18	Theo Ratliff^{+}	PF/C	United States	Detroit Pistons (from Portland)	Wyoming (Sr.)
1	19	Randolph Childress	PG	United States	Detroit Pistons (from Houston via Portland)	Wake Forest (Sr.)
1	20	Jason Caffey	PF	United States	Chicago Bulls	Alabama (Sr.)
1	21	Michael Finley^{+}	SF/SG	United States	Phoenix Suns (from L.A. Lakers)	Wisconsin (Sr.)
1	22	George Zidek	C	Czech Republic	Charlotte Hornets	UCLA (Sr.)
1	23	Travis Best	PG	United States	Indiana Pacers	Georgia Tech (Sr.)
1	24	Loren Meyer	PF	United States	Dallas Mavericks (from New York)	Iowa State (Sr.)
1	25	David Vaughn	PF/C	United States	Orlando Magic	Memphis (Jr.)
1	26	Sherell Ford	PF	United States	Seattle SuperSonics	UIC (Sr.)
1	27	Mario Bennett	PF	United States	Phoenix Suns	Arizona State (Jr.)
1	28	Greg Ostertag	C	United States	Utah Jazz	Kansas (Sr.)
1	29	Cory Alexander	PG	United States	San Antonio Spurs	Virginia (Jr.)
2	30	Lou Roe	F	United States	Detroit Pistons	UMass (Sr.)
2	31	Dragan Tarlać	C	FR Yugoslavia; Greece	Chicago Bulls	Olympiakos (Greece)
2	32	Terrence Rencher	G	United States	Washington Bullets	Texas (Sr.)
2	33	Junior Burrough	F	United States	Boston Celtics	Virginia (Sr.)
2	34	Andrew DeClercq	PF/C	United States	Golden State Warriors	Florida (Sr.)
2	35	Jimmy King	G	United States	Toronto Raptors	Michigan (Sr.)
2	36	Lawrence Moten	G	United States	Vancouver Grizzlies	Syracuse (Sr.)
2	37	Frankie King	G	United States	Los Angeles Lakers	Western Carolina (Sr.)
2	38	Rashard Griffith ^{#}	C	United States	Milwaukee Bucks	Wisconsin (So.)
2	39	Donny Marshall	F	United States	Cleveland Cavaliers	Connecticut (Sr.)
2	40	Dwayne Whitfield	F	United States	Golden State Warriors	Jackson State (Sr.)
2	41	Erik Meek^{#}	C	United States	Houston Rockets	Duke (Sr.)
2	42	Donnie Boyce	G	United States	Atlanta Hawks	Colorado (Sr.)
2	43	Eric Snow	PG	United States	Milwaukee Bucks	Michigan State (Sr.)
2	44	Anthony Pelle^{#}	C	United States	Denver Nuggets	Fresno State (Sr.)
2	45	Troy Brown^{#}	F/C	United States	Atlanta Hawks	Providence (Sr.)
2	46	George Banks^{#}	F	United States	Miami Heat	UTEP (Sr.)
2	47	Tyus Edney	PG	United States	Sacramento Kings	UCLA (Sr.)
2	48	Mark Davis	G/F	United States	Minnesota Timberwolves	Texas Tech (Sr.)
2	49	Jerome Allen	G	United States	Minnesota Timberwolves	Pennsylvania (Sr.)
2	50	Martin Lewis	F	United States	Golden State Warriors	Seward County (So.)
2	51	Dejan Bodiroga^{#}	SF	FR Yugoslavia	Sacramento Kings	Olimpia (Stefanel) Milano (Italy)
2	52	Fred Hoiberg	SG	United States	Indiana Pacers	Iowa State (Sr.)
2	53	Constantin Popa^{#}	C	Romania	Los Angeles Clippers	Miami (Florida) (Sr.)
2	54	Eurelijus Žukauskas ^{#}	C	Lithuania	Seattle SuperSonics	Neptūnas Klaipėda (Lithuania)
2	55	Michael McDonald	C	United States	Golden State Warriors	New Orleans (Sr.)
2	56	Chris Carr	G	United States	Phoenix Suns	Southern Illinois (Jr.)
2	57	Cuonzo Martin	G/F	United States	Atlanta Hawks	Purdue (Sr.)
2	58	Don Reid	F	United States	Detroit Pistons	Georgetown (Sr.)

== Notable undrafted players ==
The following players went undrafted in the 1995 NBA Draft, but later played at least one game in the NBA.

Player	Pos.	Nationality	School/Club team
John Amaechi	C	United Kingdom	Penn State (Sr.)
Corey Beck	PG	United States	Arkansas (Sr.)
Rick Brunson	G	United States	Temple (Sr.)
John Coker	C	United States	Boise State (Sr.)
Nate Driggers	SG	United States	Montevallo (Sr.)
Devin Gray	SF	United States	Clemson (Sr.)
Michael Hawkins	PG	United States	Xavier (Sr.)
Gerard King	SF	United States	Nicholls State (Sr.)
Matt Maloney	G	United States	Penn (Sr.)
Clint McDaniel	SG	United States	Arkansas (Sr.)
Howard Nathan	PG	United States	Northwest Arkansas CC (Sr.)
Ruben Nembhard	PG/SG	United States	Weber State (Sr.)
Kevin Ollie	G	United States	Connecticut (Sr.)
Ray Owes	PF	United States	Arizona (Sr.)
James Scott	SF	United States	St. John's (Sr.)
Larry Sykes	PF	United States	Xavier (Sr.)
David Vanterpool	SG	United States	St. Bonaventure (Sr.)
Rubén Wolkowyski	C	Argentina	Estudiantes de Olavarría (Argentina)

== Trades involving Draft picks ==
=== Draft-day trades ===
The following trades involving drafted players were made on the day of the draft.

- ^{a} The Los Angeles Clippers traded Randy Woods and the draft rights of Antonio McDyess to the Denver Nuggets for Rodney Rogers and the draft rights to Brent Barry.

== Early entrants ==
=== College underclassmen ===
For the first time since 1982, the NBA would officially see college underclassmen players withdraw their entry into the NBA draft. Originally, nineteen underclassmen (including one player that was playing overseas at the time and one high schooler) had declared their entry for this year's draft, but the Lithuanian born Zydrunas Ilgauskas from Lithuania's Atletas Kaunas alongside Rodrick Rhodes from the University of Kentucky and John Wallace from the University of Syracuse would all officially withdraw their names from this year's draft before it began, which left only fifteen total underclassmen directly from college. However, this year would also be the first time since 1975 where high schoolers would be declared as eligible underclassmen for the NBA. As such, the official underclassmen count would increase from fifteen to sixteen total players with the inclusion of Farragut Academy standout phenom power forward Kevin Garnett, which started an eleven-year long trend of high school players declaring their eligibility for the NBA. Even so, the following college basketball players successfully applied for early draft entrance.

- (United States) Cory Alexander – G, Virginia (junior)
- (United States) Mario Bennett – F, Arizona State (junior)
- (United States) Chris Carr – G/F, Southern Illinois (junior)
- (United States) Michael Evans – Norfolk State (junior)
- (United States) Rashard Griffith – C, Wisconsin (sophomore)
- (United States) Martin Lewis – Seward CC (sophomore)
- (United States) Antonio McDyess – F, Alabama (sophomore)
- (United States) Joe Smith – F, Maryland (sophomore)
- (United States) Jerry Stackhouse – G, North Carolina (sophomore)
- (United States) Scotty Thurman – F, Arkansas (junior)
- (United States) Gary Trent – F, Ohio (junior)
- (United States) David Vaughn III – F, Memphis (junior)
- (United States) Rasheed Wallace – F, North Carolina (sophomore)
- (United States) Corliss Williamson – F, Arkansas (junior)
- (United States) Darroll Wright – G, Missouri Western (junior)

=== High school players ===
This year marked the first year since 1975 where high school players would be allowed entry into the NBA directly from high school. However, only one player during this year would go and take that route for this year. The following high school player successfully applied for early draft entrance.

- (United States) Kevin Garnett – F, Farragut Academy (Chicago, Illinois)

== Invited attendees ==
The 1995 NBA draft is considered to be the eighteenth NBA draft to have utilized what's properly considered the "green room" experience for NBA prospects. The NBA's green room is a staging area where anticipated draftees often sit with their families and representatives, waiting for their names to be called on draft night. Often being positioned either in front of or to the side of the podium (in this case, being positioned somewhere within the SkyDome in Toronto, Canada), once a player heard his name, he would walk to the podium to shake hands and take promotional photos with the NBA commissioner. From there, the players often conducted interviews with various media outlets while backstage. From there, the players often conducted interviews with various media outlets while backstage. However, once the NBA draft started to air nationally on TV starting with the 1980 NBA draft, the green room evolved from players waiting to hear their name called and then shaking hands with these select players who were often called to the hotel to take promotional pictures with the NBA commissioner a day or two after the draft concluded to having players in real-time waiting to hear their names called up and then shaking hands with David Stern, the NBA's commissioner at the time. The NBA compiled its list of green room invites through collective voting by the NBA's team presidents and general managers alike, which in this year's case belonged to only what they believed were the top 17 prospects at the time. Despite the high number of invites, the only notable absence for this year's draft was Theo Ratliff from the University of Wyoming. Even so, the following players were invited to attend this year's draft festivities live and in person.

- (United States) Michael Finley – SG/SF, Wisconsin
- (United States) Sherell Ford – SF/PF, UIC
- (United States) Kevin Garnett – PF, Farragut Academy (Chicago, Illinois)
- (United States) Alan Henderson – PF, Indiana
- (United States) Antonio McDyess – PF, Alabama
- (United States) Ed O'Bannon – SF, UCLA
- (United States) Cherokee Parks – C, Duke
- (United States) Bryant Reeves – C, Oklahoma State
- (United States) Shawn Respert – SG, Michigan State
- (United States) Joe Smith – PF, Maryland
- (United States) Jerry Stackhouse – SG/SF, North Carolina
- (United States) Damon Stoudamire – PG, Arizona
- (United States) Bob Sura – SG, Florida State
- (United States) Kurt Thomas – PF/C, Texas Christian
- (United States) Gary Trent – PF, Ohio
- (United States) Rasheed Wallace – PF/C, North Carolina
- (United States) Corliss Williamson – PF, Arkansas

== See also ==
- List of first overall NBA draft picks
