= Shawn Respert =

American basketball player and coach (born 1972)

Personal information
- Born: February 6, 1972 (age 54) Detroit, Michigan, U.S.
- Listed height: 6 ft 1 in (1.85 m)^{[a]}
- Listed weight: 195 lb (88 kg)

Career information
- High school: Bishop Borgess (Redford, Michigan)
- College: Michigan State (1990–1995)
- NBA draft: 1995: 1st round, 8th overall pick
- Drafted by: Portland Trail Blazers
- Playing career: 1995–2003
- Position: Point guard
- Number: 3, 31, 24, 21, 2
- Coaching career: 2011–2016

Career history

Playing
- 1995–1997: Milwaukee Bucks
- 1997–1998: Toronto Raptors
- 1998: Dallas Mavericks
- 1999: Phoenix Suns
- 1999–2000: Adecco Milano
- 2000–2001: Near East
- 2001–2002: Fillattice Imola
- 2002–2003: Spójnia Stargard Szczeciński

Coaching
- 2013–2016: Memphis Grizzlies (assistant)

Career highlights
- NABC Player of the Year (1995); Sporting News College Player of the Year (1995); Consensus first-team All-American (1995); Third-team All-American – UPI (1994); Big Ten Player of the Year (1995); No. 24 retired by Michigan State Spartans

Career NBA statistics
- Points: 851 (4.9 ppg)
- Rebounds: 226 (1.3 rpg)
- Assists: 177 (1.0 apg)
- Stats at NBA.com
- Stats at Basketball Reference
Medals
Men's basketball
Representing United States
Goodwill Games
| Bronze medal – third place | 1994 St. Petersburg | National team |
Summer Universiade
| Gold medal – first place | 1993 Buffalo | National team |

Shawn Christopher Respert (born February 6, 1972) is an American former professional basketball player and coach. He attended Bishop Borgess High School, and he came to prominence while playing college basketball for the Michigan State Spartans. He played professionally in the National Basketball Association (NBA) for four seasons from 1995 to 1999. He was inducted into the Michigan Sports Hall of Fame in October 2024.

== College career ==
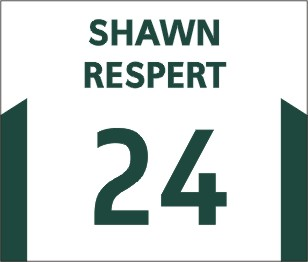
Respert's #24 was retired by Michigan State University in 1998

Respert was known by some to "stand out" at Michigan State. He and point guard Eric Snow combined to form a prolific tandem for head coach Jud Heathcote's Spartans. Respert was the team's leading scorer all four seasons at Michigan State and finished his career second all-time in scoring among Big Ten players with 2,531 points (trailing only Calbert Cheaney). He was named a unanimous first team All-American and Big Ten Player of the Year and Sporting News and NABC National Player of the Year with a 25.6 scoring average during his 1994–95 senior season. He left East Lansing as the Spartans all-time leading scorer.

=== College statistics ===
Legend
| GP | Games played | GS | Games started | MPG | Minutes per game |
| FG% | Field goal percentage | 3P% | 3-point field goal percentage | FT% | Free throw percentage |
| RPG | Rebounds per game | APG | Assists per game | SPG | Steals per game |
| BPG | Blocks per game | PPG | Points per game | **Bold** | Career high |

| Year | Team | GP | GS | MPG | FG% | 3P% | FT% | RPG | APG | SPG | BPG | PPG |
|---|---|---|---|---|---|---|---|---|---|---|---|---|
| 1990–91 | Michigan State | 1 | - | 3.0 | .000 | .000 | .000 | 0.0 | 0.0 | 0.0 | 0.0 | 0.0 |
| 1991–92 | Michigan State | 30 | 30 | 31.8 | **.503** | .455 | **.872** | 2.1 | 2.1 | 1.1 | 0.1 | 15.8 |
| 1992–93 | Michigan State | 28 | 28 | **34.3** | .481 | .429 | .856 | **4.0** | 2.6 | 0.9 | **0.2** | 20.1 |
| 1993–94 | Michigan State | **32** | **32** | 33.6 | .484 | .449 | .840 | **4.0** | 2.5 | 1.3 | **0.2** | 24.3 |
| 1994–95 | Michigan State | 28 | 28 | 33.6 | .473 | **.474** | .869 | **4.0** | **3.0** | **1.4** | 0.0 | **25.6** |
| Career | | 119 | 118 | 33.0 | .484 | .454 | .857 | 3.5 | 2.5 | 1.2 | 0.1 | 21.3 |

== Professional career ==
Respert was selected by the Portland Trail Blazers in the 1st round, with the 8th overall pick, of the 1995 NBA draft. The Blazers traded his NBA rights to the Milwaukee Bucks for the rights to Gary Trent and a first-round pick. Respert was traded to Toronto in his second year, where he scored 5.6 points a game. He next played briefly in Dallas the next season and then had a second stint with the Raptors. Respert finished his career in Phoenix during the 1998–99 season. He was under contract with Los Angeles Lakers for a brief period in October 2000 but was waived before playing in any NBA games for them. In his NBA career, Respert played in 172 games and scored a total of 851 points on averages of 4.9 points in 13.7 minutes per game.

He played professionally in Italy for Adecco Milano (1999–2000) and Fillattice Imola (2001–2002). He also played in Poland for Spójnia Stargard Szczeciński (2002–2003).

Respert had stomach cancer but did not admit it until 2005. He started being bothered with stomach cramps towards the end of his rookie season. He noticed a lump below his belly button even after changing his diet. Respert was diagnosed with cancer after undergoing a series of tests at Milwaukee's St. Joseph Regional Medical Center in May 1996. After confirmation through a second opinion, he underwent daily radiation therapy for three consecutive months, losing twenty pounds in the process. The only people who knew about this treatment were the Bucks' trainers, doctors, his coach Mike Dunleavy, Sr. and Michigan State backcourt partner Eric Snow. He only told a select few; not even his family and girlfriend knew, because "people don't want to hear excuses in pro sports, even if the excuse is cancer."

== NBA career statistics ==
Legend
| GP | Games played | GS | Games started | MPG | Minutes per game |
| FG% | Field goal percentage | 3P% | 3-point field goal percentage | FT% | Free throw percentage |
| RPG | Rebounds per game | APG | Assists per game | SPG | Steals per game |
| BPG | Blocks per game | PPG | Points per game | **Bold** | Career high |

| Year | Team | GP | GS | MPG | FG% | 3P% | FT% | RPG | APG | SPG | BPG | PPG |
|---|---|---|---|---|---|---|---|---|---|---|---|---|
| 1995–96 | Milwaukee | **62** | 0 | 13.6 | .387 | .344 | .833 | 1.2 | 1.1 | 0.5 | **0.1** | 4.9 |
| 1996–97 | Milwaukee | 14 | 0 | 5.9 | .316 | .111 | **1.000** | 0.5 | 0.6 | 0.0 | 0.0 | 1.4 |
| 1996–97 | Toronto | 27 | 0 | 15.3 | .442 | **.396** | .844 | 1.2 | 1.2 | **0.7** | **0.1** | 5.6 |
| 1997–98 | Toronto | 47 | **4** | 14.8 | **.450** | .373 | .815 | 1.6 | 0.9 | 0.6 | 0.0 | 5.5 |
| 1997–98 | Dallas | 10 | 0 | **21.5** | .429 | .231 | .571 | **2.7** | **1.7** | 0.5 | 0.0 | **8.2** |
| 1998–99 | Phoenix | 12 | 1 | 8.3 | .361 | .308 | .700 | 1.1 | 0.7 | 0.4 | 0.0 | 3.1 |
| Career | | 172 | 5 | 13.7 | .414 | .340 | .816 | 1.3 | 1.0 | 0.5 | 0.0 | 4.9 |

== Coaching career ==
Respert became a volunteer coach at Prairie View A&M in Texas in 2004. In early 2005, he was hired to be director of basketball operations at Rice University for 2 1/2 years. He then spent two years as the director of player development of the NBA's minor league, the NBA Development League. In September 2008, he was hired by the Houston Rockets as the director of player programs. On December 6, 2011, Respert was hired by the Minnesota Timberwolves as a player development coach. He was named an assistant coach by the Memphis Grizzlies in September 2013. Respert then moved to the Chicago Bulls as a director of player development in 2018. His tenure with the Bulls lasted until the end of the 2019–20 season when his contract expired.

== Notes ==
- **^{a}** Respert's listed height has ranged from 6 ft 1 in (1.85 m) to 6 ft 3 in (1.91 m).
