= Doug Terry =

American football player (born 1968)

No. 32, 25, 24, 28
- Position: Safety

Personal information
- Born: December 12, 1969 (age 56); Dumas, Arkansas, U.S.
- Listed height: 5 ft 11 in (1.80 m)
- Listed weight: 204 lb (93 kg)

Career information
- High school: Liberal (KS)
- College: Kansas (1988–1991)
- NFL draft: 1992: undrafted

Career history
- Kansas City Chiefs (1992–1995); Scottish Claymores (1997)

Career NFL statistics
- Tackles: 107
- Sacks: 1
- Interceptions: 2
- Fumble recoveries: 3
- Stats at Pro Football Reference

Douglas Maurice Terry (born February 10, 1968) is an American former professional football player who was a defensive back for four seasons with the Kansas City Chiefs of the National Football League (NFL). He played college football for the Kansas Jayhawks.
