= Liberal High School (Kansas) =

Location
- 1611 West 2nd Street; Liberal, Kansas 67901; United States; 37°02′30″N 100°56′36″W

Information
- School type: Public, High School
- School board: Board Website
- School district: Liberal USD 480
- CEEB code: 171770
- Principal: Darla Forney
- Teaching staff: 91.16 (FTE)
- Grades: 9 to 12
- Enrollment: 1,421 (as of 2025-2026)
- Student to teacher ratio: 15.59
- Campus type: Rural
- Colors: Red; Black
- Athletics: KHSAA 6A
- Athletics conference: Western Athletic Conference
- Team name: Liberal Redskins; Lady Red
- Rival: Dodge City Red Demons; Garden City Buffaloes; Great Bend Panthers
- Newspaper: Angry Red News
- Website: Liberal High School

Liberal High School is a public high school (spanning grades 9–12) that is located in Liberal, Kansas, United States. It is operated by Liberal USD 480. The school colors are red and black. The enrollment for the 2025-2026 school year was approximately 1,421 students. Liberal High School is a member of the Kansas State High School Activities Association and offers a variety of sports programs. Athletic teams compete in the 6A division and are known as the "Redskins". Extracurricular activities are also offered in the form of performing arts, school publications, and clubs.

== Extracurricular activities ==
The Redskins compete in the Western Athletic Conference and are classified as a 6A school, the largest classification in Kansas according to the Kansas State High School Activities Association. Liberal has won 35 state championships in various sports.

=== Athletics ===
Many sports are offered at Liberal High School. The boys' track and field program set a state record of 14 consecutive state titles between 1991 and 2004. The girls' track and field program won 12 state titles, including 8 in a row between 1994 and 2001.

=== State championships ===
State Championships
Season	Sport	Number of Championships	Year
Fall	Football	5	1980, 1992, 1994, 1995, 1997
Fall	Cross Country, Girls	2	2002, 2016
Fall	Soccer, Boys	1	2011
Winter	Basketball, Boys	1	1986
Winter	Basketball, Girls	1	1976
Spring	Track and Field, Boys	14	1991, 1992, 1993, 1994, 1995, 1996, 1997, 1998, 1999, 2000, 2001, 2002, 2003, 2004
Spring	Track and Field, Girls	12	1984, 1985, 1994, 1995, 1996, 1997, 1998, 1999, 2000, 2001, 2003, 2004
Total		35	

Liberal High School offers the following sports:

=== Fall ===
- Football
- Volleyball
- Boys Cross-Country
- Girls Cross-Country
- Girls Golf
- Boys Soccer
- Girls Tennis
- Dance Team
- Cheerleading

=== Winter ===
- Boys Swim
- Boys Basketball
- Girls Basketball
- Wrestling
- Boys Bowling
- Girls Bowling
- Dance Team
- Winter Cheerleading

=== Spring ===
- Baseball
- Boys Golf
- Boys Tennis
- Girls Soccer
- Girls Swimming/Diving
- Softball
- Boys Track and Field
- Girls Track and Field

== Notable alumni ==
- Lamar Chapman, former NFL and CFL player
- Martin Lewis, former NBA player for the Toronto Raptors
- Kelli McCarty, Miss USA 1991
- Jerrod Niemann, country musician
- Melvin Sanders, former NBA player for the San Antonio Spurs
- William Stafford, poet, appointed as the 20th Consultant in Poetry to the Library of Congress, awarded the National Book Award for Poetry, Guggenheim Fellowship, Western States Book Award, Robert Frost Medal
- Doug Terry, former NFL player for the Kansas City Chiefs
- Jerame Tuman, former NFL player for the Pittsburgh Steelers and Arizona Cardinals
- Larry Welch, retired General and 12th Chief of Staff of the United States Air Force

== See also ==
- List of high schools in Kansas
- List of unified school districts in Kansas
