= Gary Trent =

American basketball player (born 1974)

Personal information
- Born: September 22, 1974 (age 52) Columbus, Ohio, U.S.
- Listed height: 6 ft 8 in (2.03 m)
- Listed weight: 250 lb (113 kg)

Career information
- High school: Hamilton Township (Columbus, Ohio)
- College: Ohio (1992–1995)
- NBA draft: 1995: 1st round, 11th overall pick
- Drafted by: Milwaukee Bucks
- Playing career: 1995–2007
- Position: Power forward / small forward
- Number: 33, 20

Career history
- 1995–1998: Portland Trail Blazers
- 1998: Toronto Raptors
- 1999–2001: Dallas Mavericks
- 2001–2004: Minnesota Timberwolves
- 2004–2005: Panellinios
- 2005: Lottomatica Roma
- 2006–2007: Panellinios

Career highlights
- All-Greek League Second Team (2005); Greek League All-Star (2005); 3× MAC Player of the Year (1993–1995); 3× First-team All-MAC (1993–1995); No. 20 retired by Ohio Bobcats

Career NBA statistics
- Points: 4,366 (8.6 ppg)
- Rebounds: 2,276 (4.5 rpg)
- Assists: 504 (1.0 apg)
- Stats at NBA.com
- Stats at Basketball Reference

Gary Dajaun Trent Sr. (born September 22, 1974) is an American former professional basketball player. He is the father of current basketball player Gary Trent Jr.

== Early life ==
Born and raised in Columbus, Ohio, Trent played his high school basketball at Hamilton Township High School. In his senior season, he shot 81.4 percent from the field, a national high school record.

He played college basketball at Ohio University in the Mid-American Conference (MAC), where his size and powerful play earned him the nickname "The Shaq of the MAC". Trent was named MAC Player of the Year all three years that he played in Athens (1993–95). Trent's no. 20 Bobcat jersey was retired on January 21, 2012, during halftime of an Ohio vs. Miami University game that the Bobcats won, 69–65. Trent was inducted into the MAC Hall of Fame in 2013.

== Professional career ==
After college, Trent was selected by the Milwaukee Bucks with the 11th pick in the 1995 NBA draft. He was immediately traded to the Portland Trail Blazers in exchange for their selection, Shawn Respert. During his NBA career from 1995 to 2004, he played with the Portland Trail Blazers, Toronto Raptors, Dallas Mavericks and Minnesota Timberwolves.

Trent re-established his career overseas, first appearing with the Greek club Panellinios B.C. during the 2004–05 season, then briefly suiting up with the Pallacanestro Virtus Roma club of Italy in late 2005, and returning to Greece to rejoin Panellinios BC for the 2006–07 season.

== Personal life ==
His son, Gary Trent Jr., played college basketball for the Duke Blue Devils. With the 37th pick in the second round of the 2018 NBA draft, Trent Jr. was drafted by the Sacramento Kings. He was immediately traded to the Portland Trail Blazers in exchange for two future second-round draft picks. Trent Jr. was a highly regarded recruit and was listed as a top ten recruit by websites such as ESPN and 24/7 Sports. In 2021, Trent Jr. was traded to the Toronto Raptors.

== See also ==
- List of NCAA Division I men's basketball players with 2000 points and 1000 rebounds
