= Martin Lewis (basketball) =

American basketball player

Personal information
- Born: April 28, 1975 (age 51) Liberal, Kansas, U.S.
- Listed height: 6 ft 5 in (1.96 m)
- Listed weight: 210 lb (95 kg)

Career information
- High school: Liberal (Liberal, Kansas)
- College: Butler County CC (1993–1994); Seward County CC (1994–1995)
- NBA draft: 1995: 2nd round, 50th overall pick
- Drafted by: Golden State Warriors
- Playing career: 1995–2002
- Position: Shooting guard / small forward
- Number: 44, 32

Career history
- 1995–1997: Toronto Raptors
- 1997–1998: Winnipeg Cyclone
- 1999–2000: La Crosse Bobcats
- 2000–2001: Kansas Cagerz
- 2000–2001: Cincinnati Stuff
- 2001: Mobile Revelers
- 2002: Roanoke Dazzle
- Stats at NBA.com
- Stats at Basketball Reference

Martin Lewis (born April 28, 1975) is an American former professional basketball player for the Toronto Raptors of the National Basketball Association (NBA).

Lewis, a 6-foot-5-inch (1.96 m) and 210 pounds (95 kg) small forward, played competitively with Seward County Community College and Butler County Community College (both located in Kansas).

Lewis was selected 50th overall in the 1995 NBA draft by the Golden State Warriors and played briefly with the Toronto Raptors from 1996–1997. He later played in the International Basketball Association Continental Basketball Association, International basketball League, United States Basketball League and NBA Development League.
