= Seward County Community College =

Community college in Liberal, Kansas, US

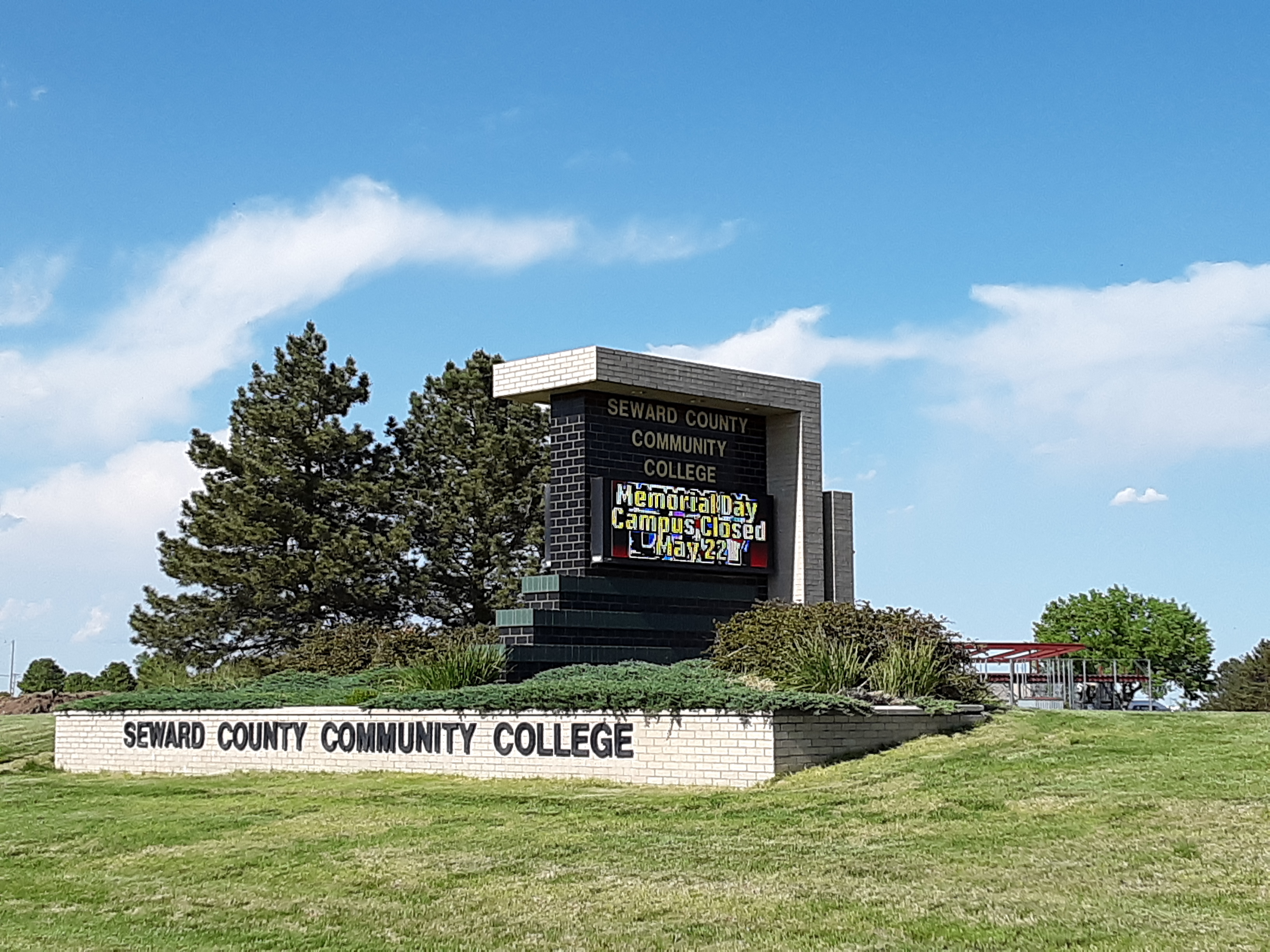
- Main entrance to the college, 2019
- Type: Public community college
- Established: December 29, 1967
- President: Brad Bennett
- Students: 1,787 (Fall 2023)
- Location: Liberal, Kansas, United States; 37°03′35″N 100°55′05″W
- Colors: Green and White
- Nickname: Saints
- Sporting affiliations: Kansas Jayhawk Community College Conference
- Mascot: Louie the Saint
- Website: sccc.edu
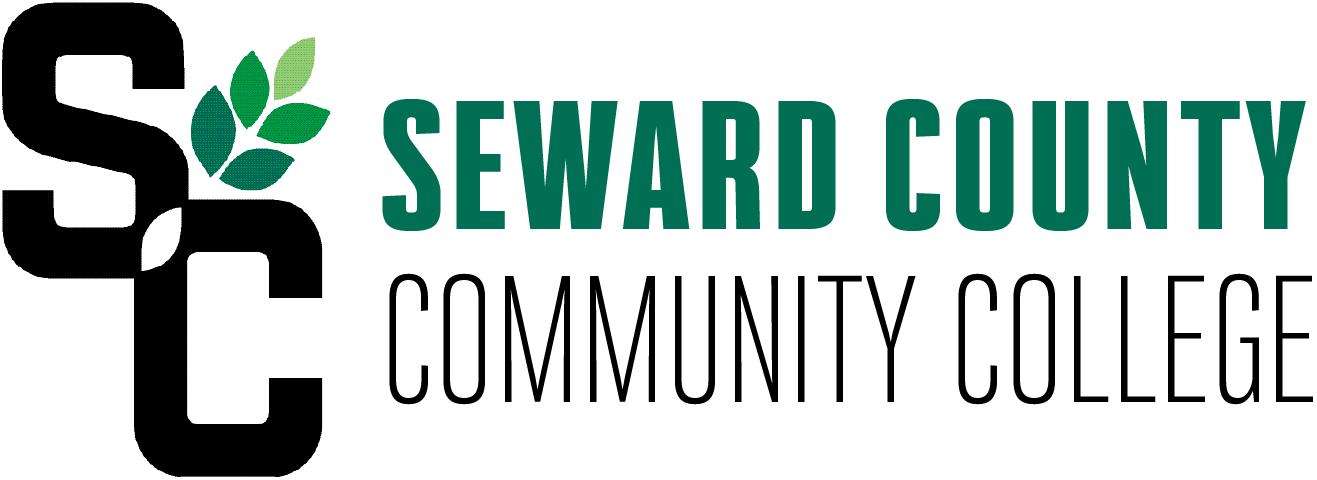

Seward County Community College (SCCC) is a public community college in Liberal, Kansas. It offers a variety of programs and degrees, including associate degrees, technical certificates, and continuing education opportunities. The college offers training that prepares students for the workforce or for transfer to a four-year institution.

== History ==
Established on December 29, 1967, its classes officially started on September 2, 1969. For the 2008–2009 academic year, Seward County Community College merged with Southwest Technical School to become Seward County Community College/Area Technical School. The name changed again in 2016 when the institution once again became Seward County Community College. The college retained the technical school programs and facilities as an academic division of the larger organization.

== Academics ==
Seward County Community College academics are currently divided into five academic divisions: Allied Health; Industrial Technology; Agriculture, Business & Personal Services; Humanities and Social Sciences; and Science, Math and PE. The academic divisions collectively offer 40 majors. The Allied Health division provides programs in nursing, surgical technology, lab technology and respiratory therapy, which is a major supply point for medical personnel in the area.

== Athletics ==
Seward County Community College athletics participates in men's and women's sports in the Kansas Jayhawk Community College Conference. Women's sports include: basketball, softball, volleyball, and tennis. Men's sports include: baseball, basketball, and tennis. Additionally, the Saints boast a co-ed cheerleading team. The two primary sporting arenas for the Saints are "The Greenhouse" which is the college gymnasium, and Brent Gould Field, the baseball field. On April 25, 2019, the college broke ground on the new Sharp Family Champions Center, which will serve as an indoor practice facility, and clubhouse for Saints baseball, softball, and tennis.

The center was opened February 9, 2024. Lead donor JoAnn Sharp did the honors.

== Notable alumni ==
- Tegan Cunningham, former professional women's basketball player in the Women's National Basketball League (WNBL) and current Australian Rules footballer in the AFLW
- Martin Lewis, former guard/forward drafted in the second round of the 1995 NBA draft
- Marcus Pollard, former professional football player for the Indianapolis Colts, Detroit Lions, Seattle Seahawks, and Atlanta Falcons
- Kelby Tomlinson, former infielder for the San Francisco Giants
