= Kobe Bryant's 81-point game =

2006 NBA game

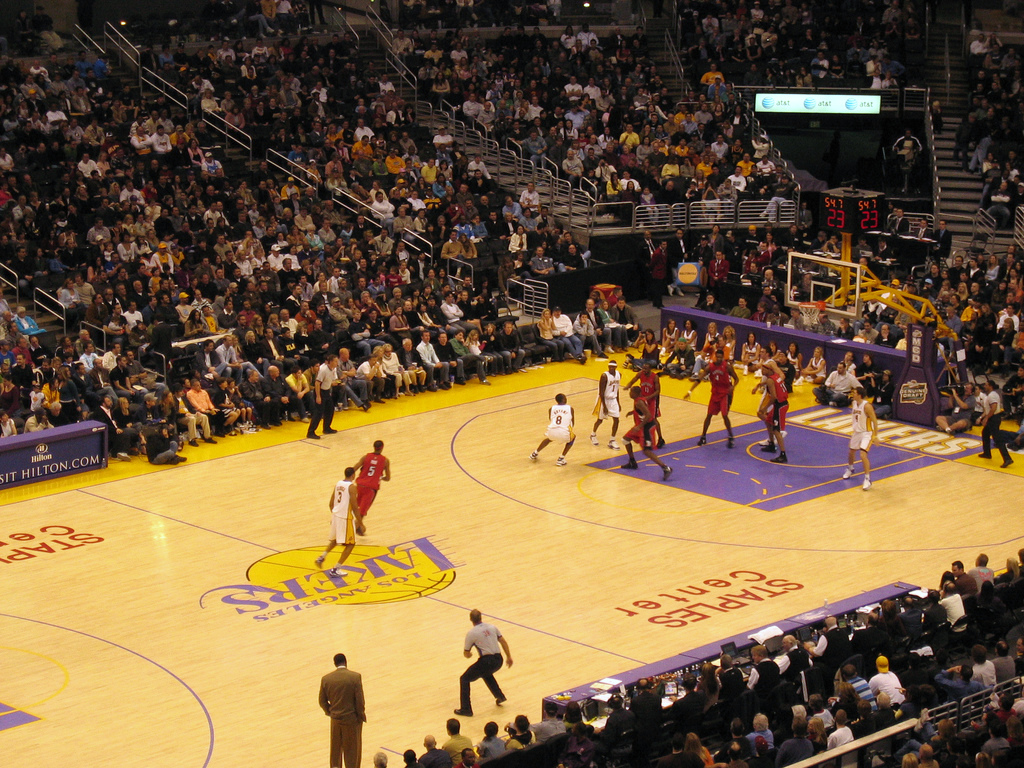
- Photo midway through Bryant's 81-point game against the Raptors on January 22, 2006
Toronto Raptors	Los Angeles Lakers
104	122
Head coach: Sam Mitchell	Head coach: Phil Jackson
	1	2	3	4	Total
Toronto Raptors	36	27	22	19	104
Los Angeles Lakers	29	20	42	31	122
- Date: January 22, 2006
- Venue: Staples Center, Los Angeles, California
- Attendance: 18,997

On January 22, 2006, Kobe Bryant scored a career-high 81 points for the Los Angeles Lakers in a 122–104 win over the Toronto Raptors. Bryant scored what was at the time the most points scored since the NBA–ABA merger and second-most points in a single-game in NBA history (since surpassed by Bam Adebayo's 83-point game in 2026 against the Washington Wizards).

The game, which the Lakers trailed 63–49 at halftime and 71–53 in the third quarter, saw Bryant play 42 minutes, shooting 28-of-46 from the field, including 7-of-13 on three-pointers, with 55 points in the second half. The game occurred during Bryant's extraordinary scoring season in 2005–06, which not only included scoring 81 points, but outscoring the entire Dallas Mavericks team (62–61) through three quarters on December 20, 2005, 40 points or more in 27 games, and six games of 50 points or more. As such, he led the league with 35.4 points per game (PPG) that season, the highest PPG total since Michael Jordan’s 37.09 in 1986–87.

Unlike Chamberlain's 100-point game, the game was televised locally in Los Angeles and the surrounding Southern California areas on FSN West (Fox Sports Net West). Bill Macdonald (play-by-play, filling in for Joel Meyers who was calling that year's NFC Championship Game for CBS Radio), Stu Lantz (analyst), and Patrick O'Neal (sideline) were the FSN West television broadcasters. The game was also available in Canada on theScore and on NBA League Pass in North America through a cable provider.

== Background ==
Kobe Bryant and the Lakers had won three consecutive championships from 2000–2002 and Bryant had been marketed as potentially the league's next Michael Jordan. However, his image took a hit after he was accused of sexual assault in 2003, and was seen as a contributing factor for his public feud and eventual break-up with co-star Shaquille O'Neal, which led to O'Neal being traded to Miami after the 2003–04 season. Adding more fuel to the fire was when ex-coach Phil Jackson, who had just stepped down after the Lakers upset defeat to the Detroit Pistons in the NBA Finals, called Bryant "uncoachable" and "selfish" in his book, The Last Season: A Team in Search of Its Soul. In 2004–05, without O'Neal, Jackson, or Bryant's best friend on the team Derek Fisher, the Lakers failed to make the playoffs for the first time since 1993–94, with Bryant missing 16 games due to various injuries.

Entering the 2005–06 season, Bryant was at a career crossroads. He was still recognized as one of the best players in the NBA, but he was on a team that had a little chance at competing for a championship. Jackson had returned to the team as coach, citing a desire to wanting to work with a more mature Bryant. Despite dipping below .500 during the November, the team recovered and finished 2005 with a 15–14 record. The early season highlight was a December 20 game against the Dallas Mavericks, which saw Bryant score 62 points in three quarters in a blowout win. The feat included Bryant outscoring the Mavericks through three quarters by himself (62–61). Phil Jackson allowed Kobe to rest in the fourth quarter because the game was a blowout. Kobe declined to re-enter, saying he would "get it another time". Jeanie Buss, Jackson's girlfriend, owner's Jerry Buss daughter, and Lakers vice president of player personnel, was self-admittedly mad at Jackson for not allowing Bryant to play the fourth quarter.

The Lakers had entered their January 22 home game against the Toronto Raptors with a 21–19 record. After starting the year 0–9 and 1–15, the Raptors had played much better, largely due to the emergence of third-year power forward Chris Bosh, but were still 14–26 on the season.

== Game report ==
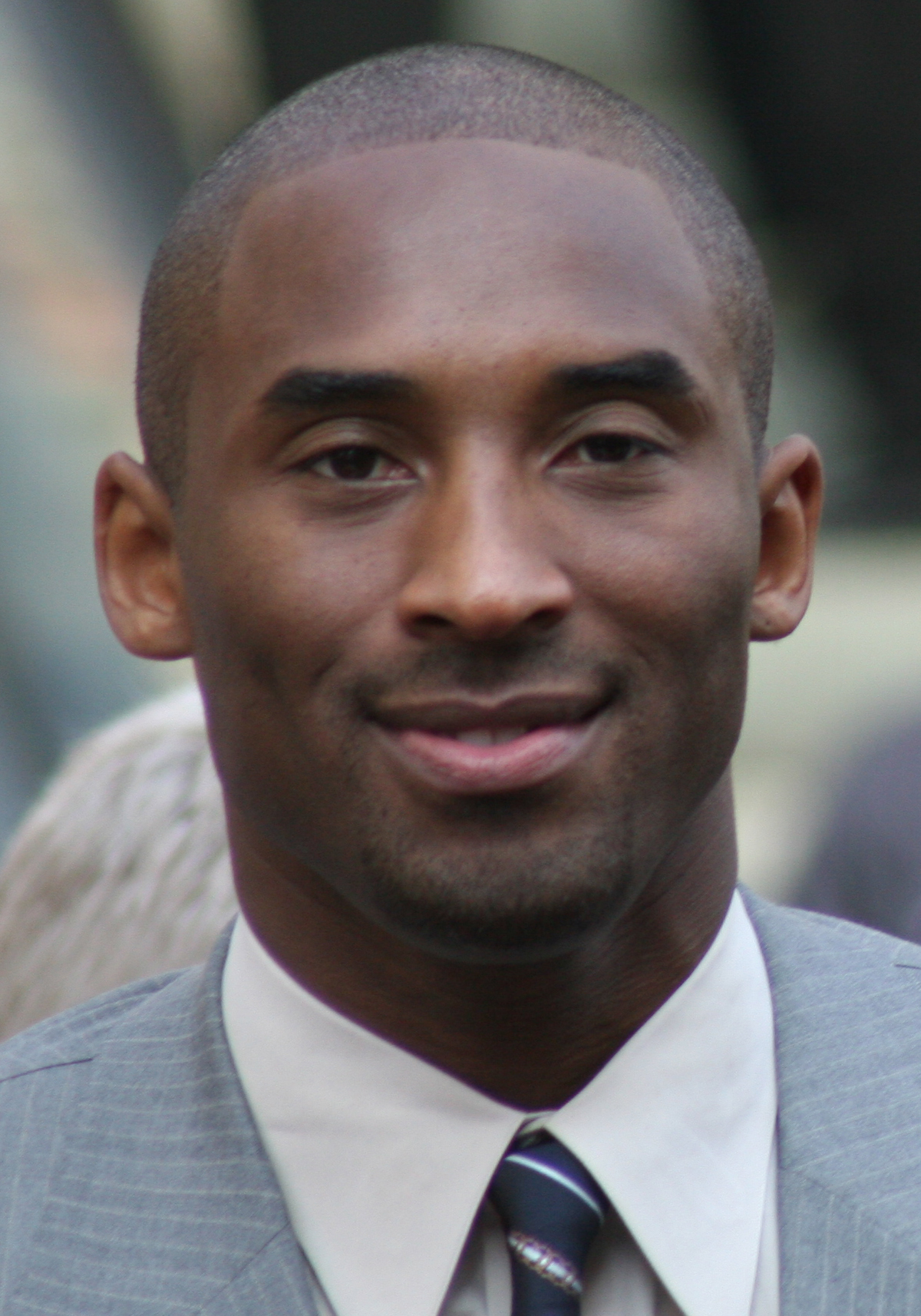
Bryant in 2006.

On January 22, 2006, much of the sporting world's attention in America was placed on the NFL's AFC and NFC Championship Games. Earlier in the day, the Pittsburgh Steelers punched their ticket to Super Bowl XL and the Seattle Seahawks and Carolina Panthers game was kicking off just as the Lakers and Raptors game was starting. For the Lakers broadcast team, there was a scheduling conflict as the team's #1 play-by-play man, Joel Meyers, had a contractual duty to call the NFC Championship Game in Seattle for CBS radio. Filling in for Meyers, calling his first NBA game ever, was the FSN West pre-and-post studio host, Bill Macdonald. (Note: Macdonald later would become the Lakers #1 TV play-by-play announcer in 2011, a position he still has to date.) Calling the game on the radio for Los Angeles was Spero Dedes, his first year in the role as play-by-play man, and former Laker Mychal Thompson, on KLAC 570. The Lakers were coming off two consecutive losses: an overtime road loss to the Sacramento Kings, a 51-point effort from Bryant, and a blowout defeat to the rival Phoenix Suns, also on the road. Prior to that, the Lakers had been a season-high four games over .500, after a home win against former star Laker Shaquille O'Neal and Miami Heat on January 16. It was Kobe and the Lakers' first win against Shaq after losing both games the previous season and on Christmas 2005 to the Heat. This was the second game at the Staples Center on January 22, as the Los Angeles Clippers had defeated the Golden State Warriors, 105–92, in a matinee tipoff. A few days following this game, the Lakers would embark on their annual Grammy roadtrip, playing seven games on the road in 12 days.

Starting for the Lakers was their usual line-up of Smush Parker (PG), Kobe Bryant (SG), Lamar Odom (SF), Kwame Brown (PF), and Chris Mihm (C). The Raptors started Mike James (PG), Jalen Rose (SG), Morris Peterson (SF), Chris Bosh (PF), and Matt Bonner (C). Being in Los Angeles, there were a few celebrities seating courtside, including Andy Dick, Joe Walsh, and Chris Rock, the latter who was interviewed by the Lakers telecast in the second quarter. During the first Lakers versus Raptors meeting this season on December 7, Bryant had a season-low 11 points. The Lakers won that game, 102–91.

=== First half ===
At 10:55 in the first quarter, Smush Parker scored the first points of the game after a Jalen Rose turnover led to an open breakaway dunk. Roughly a minute later, Bryant scored his first points on a reverse layup over Bonner. A few seconds later, Bryant scored a mid-range fadeaway jump-shot over Rose. The Raptors started the game off with hot shooting, making 3-of-4 three-point shots and shooting 72% from the field, as they led by 10 midway through the first quarter. After Jackson took a timeout, the Raptors came out in a zone defense, which is what they stayed in for most of the game. The first possession out of the timeout, Bryant scored his third basket on a wide-open long two-point shot. In the first quarter, the Raptors led 36–29. Mike James and Charlie Villanueva led the way for Toronto with 11 and 10 points, respectively. Bryant had 14 points, including his 61st consecutive free-throw make on the season.

In the second quarter, the Lakers encountered some trouble. With Kobe out of the game at the start of the quarter, the Lakers offense became stagnant. They were even booed by the home crowd before Jackson took a timeout with 8:47 left in the quarter. Their first points of the quarter did not come until 8:07 when Sasha Vujačić made a three. Bryant did not check back into the game until six minutes left in the quarter and his first shot was a three-point make over Pape Sow, with Toronto still in a zone defense. With 51.2 left in the half, Bryant missed his first free-throw after 62 consecutive makes, although after the miss, he got the rebound and banked in a two-point shot. Going into halftime, the Raptors led after a James three to put them up 63–49 and the Lakers were once again booed by the crowd. Toronto shot 62% from the field compared to 40% from Los Angeles. At this point, Kobe had just 26 points.

=== Second half ===
In the third quarter, the game would get more interesting, as the Lakers and Bryant picked up the effort following their lethargic first half. Bryant actually missed his first two shots of the third quarter, a wide open three and contested two-pointer, with the Raptors still in a zone. A few moments later, Bryant made a driving reverse finger roll. He then made three consecutive baskets, a mid-range jump-shot and two threes, as the Lakers now trailed 73–61. Until an Odom free throw make with at 6:53 in the third quarter, Bryant had made 19 straight points for the Lakers. Raptors coach Sam Mitchell called a timeout in the wake of a Kobe three at 6:20 to put him at 41 points. Out of the timeout, Bosh made a pair of free throws, and Bryant made a contested jumper over Rose, and was fouled in the process. On the next possession, Bryant stole the ball, but committed a charge on the fast break layup attempt. At 4:42, Mitchell called another timeout following another Kobe three that cut the Raptors lead to five; Bryant was at 47 points at this point. Kobe crossed the 50-point barrier with a steal and emphatic dunk to put the Lakers in the lead at 87–85 and bring the Staples Center crowd to their feet. With the Raptors mostly playing man defense at this point, Kobe missed his final shot of the third quarter, but not before scoring 27 points in the quarter, going 11-for-15 from the field, and bringing his point total to 53. The Lakers, who were booed off the court at halftime, were given a standing ovation, with Bryant's historical quarter at an end.

This was already Bryant's ninth 50+ point game entering the fourth quarter, only behind Elgin Baylor's seventeen 50-point games in Lakers history. He was hit in the face by Morris Peterson early in the quarter following a drive to the basket, but no foul was called; he then picked up a technical arguing the non-call. His first points of the quarter did not come until 9:47 into fourth, which were a pair of free throw makes. While at the line, the Staples Center crowd chanted, "MVP! MVP!". Despite playing for a mediocre team, Bryant was looked at as one of the MVP frontrunners due to his historic scoring season. He reached the 60-point barrier after a nifty drive to the basket in between defenders that ended in a layup. He surpassed his Lakers career-high from earlier in the season on two free throws at 6:01; he was now at 64. As Bryant was at the line, most of the Staples Center crowd were on their feet, applauding his already extraordinary scoring night.

At 5:30 in the fourth, Bryant hit another three over the outstretched arms of Rose. A Kwame Brown screen allowed Bryant to get off a wide open three for his 70th point. He was just the fifth player to score 70 points in an NBA game, joining Wilt Chamberlain (who did it six times), Elgin Baylor, David Thompson, and David Robinson. Kobe made his 72nd point a few seconds later at 4:23, and thus surpassing Baylor for most in Lakers history. He then surpassed Thompson (73 points in 1978) with a running shot inside the key, giving him 74 points. These points gave him the second highest point total in NBA history. Bosh fouled out the game on a Bryant attempted layup; he would hit the free throws to give him 76. At 1:47 left in the game, Bryant was fouled on a three-point attempt by Joey Graham. He would make all three free throws to give him 79. By this point, the Lakers had taken full control of the game with a 120–102 score, but no one had left at the Staples Center due to Bryant's night. Bryant's 80th and 81st points came in the last seconds of the game after he was fouled on a drive to the hoop. He hit both and was taken out of the game and given a long standing ovation. In the second half, Kobe outscored the entire Raptors team 55–41.

=== Post-game and immediate reaction ===
Whereas Chamberlain was fed repeatedly by teammates for inside shots in a blowout win, Bryant created his own shots—mostly from the outside—in a game which the Lakers trailed at halftime by 14 and did not pull away until the fourth quarter. Chamberlain, playing in an era when the games were paced faster and scoring opportunities were more plentiful, accounted for 59 percent of his team's points in Philadelphia's 169–147 victory, compared to Bryant scoring 66 percent of the Lakers' 122 points.

Kobe Bryant's post-game interview with Patrick O'Neal:

"Not even in my dreams. That was something that just happened. It's tough to explain. It's just one of those things. It really hasn't, like, set in for me. It's about the `W,' that's why I turned it on. It turned into something special. To sit here and say I grasp what happened, that would be lying."

The last words spoken at the Staples Center that night were by Lawrence Tanter, the Lakers public address announcer, imploring fans to save their ticket.

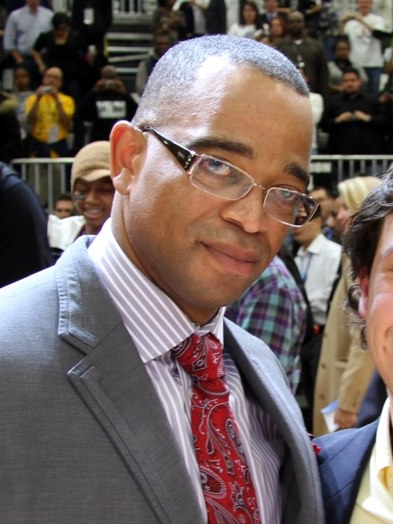
Despite the NFL playoff games, Kobe's 81-point performance led the primetime edition of SportsCenter, hosted by Stuart Scott (pictured) and Steve Levy.

Despite the NFL playoff games, Bryant's historic night quickly became the story in the sports world. It led the primetime edition of SportsCenter. Anchor Stuart Scott stated, "I don't believe the box score that I'm reading to you" after highlighting the game. Largely overshadowed by Bryant's game, the SuperSonics defeated the Suns 152–149 later that night in double overtime, which was the highest-scoring NBA game in 11 years at that time. Ray Allen led the Sonics with 42 points and hit the game-winning 3-pointer at the buzzer.

Raptors coach Sam Mitchell received some criticism for his coaching decisions, most specifically for waiting deep into the game to start doubling Bryant. The Raptors were up by 14 at halftime and by 18 in the third quarter. Mitchell felt that changing the defensive approach while winning would be unnecessary so he kept the team in a zone as Bryant was heating up. In the third quarter, Mitchell did not completely ignore trying to double Bryant; he tried various strategies, including a "triangle and two" "box-and-one" and zone defenses, along with trying different defenders (Jalen Rose, Morris Peterson, and Jose Calderon). He had since reflected, stating, when a player of Kobe's caliber is in "the zone", traditional double-teams would not have mattered. Years later, Jalen Rose stated he suggested to the coaching staff to start doubling Bryant earlier in the game, but they declined.

== Legacy ==
External videos
- Compilation of NBA players reaction to Bryant's 81-point game

Three years later, Kobe Bryant would have another historic scoring night. On February 2, 2009, he set a record for the most points at Madison Square Garden, scoring 61 points in a 126-117 Los Angeles Lakers win over the New York Knicks. He surpassed his boyhood icon, Michael Jordan, who held the record for a cumulative twenty-two years and ten months. Jordan originally set the record in 1986 with 50 points and broke his own record when he scored 55 points in his fifth game back from retirement in 1995. Bryant's MSG record would later be broken when Knicks' forward Carmelo Anthony scored 62 points on January 24, 2014, against the Charlotte Bobcats.

As requested by Bryant himself, his holding up one finger to salute the crowd as he was being taken out of the game was sculpted into a statue in Star Plaza outside of Crypto.com Arena, unveiled on February 8, 2024. Accompanying the statue was a sculpted box score of the game. Bryant was the sixth Lakers player and seventh team employee to be honored with a statue in Star Plaza, joining Shaquille O'Neal, Kareem Abdul-Jabbar, Magic Johnson, Jerry West, Elgin Baylor and Lakers announcer Chick Hearn. Kobe was not present during the statue unveiling, as he passed away four years earlier on January 26, 2020, in a helicopter accident along with eight others, including Bryant's daughter Gianna Bryant. On August 2, 2024, the Lakers unveiled a statue of Kobe and Gianna outside Crypto.com Arena. Both statues were sculpted by Julie Rotblatt-Amrany.

On the game's twentieth anniversary in 2026, Nike reissued the shoes Bryant wore during his 81-point game.

On March 10, 2026, Miami Heat center Bam Adebayo surpassed Bryant's 81 points with 83 for most points scored in a game since the NBA–ABA merger in 1976.

== Kobe Bryant's box score ==
Statistics by quarter
Quarter	Min	FGM	FGA	FTM	FTA	3P	3PA	PTS
1st	12	5	10	4	4	0	1	14
2nd	6	5	8	1	2	1	1	12
3rd	12	11	15	1	1	4	5	27
4th	12	7	13	12	13	2	6	28
Total	42	28	46	18	20	7	13	81

== See also ==
- Wilt Chamberlain's 100-point game
- Bam Adebayo's 83-point game
- List of career achievements by Kobe Bryant
