= List of career achievements by Kobe Bryant =

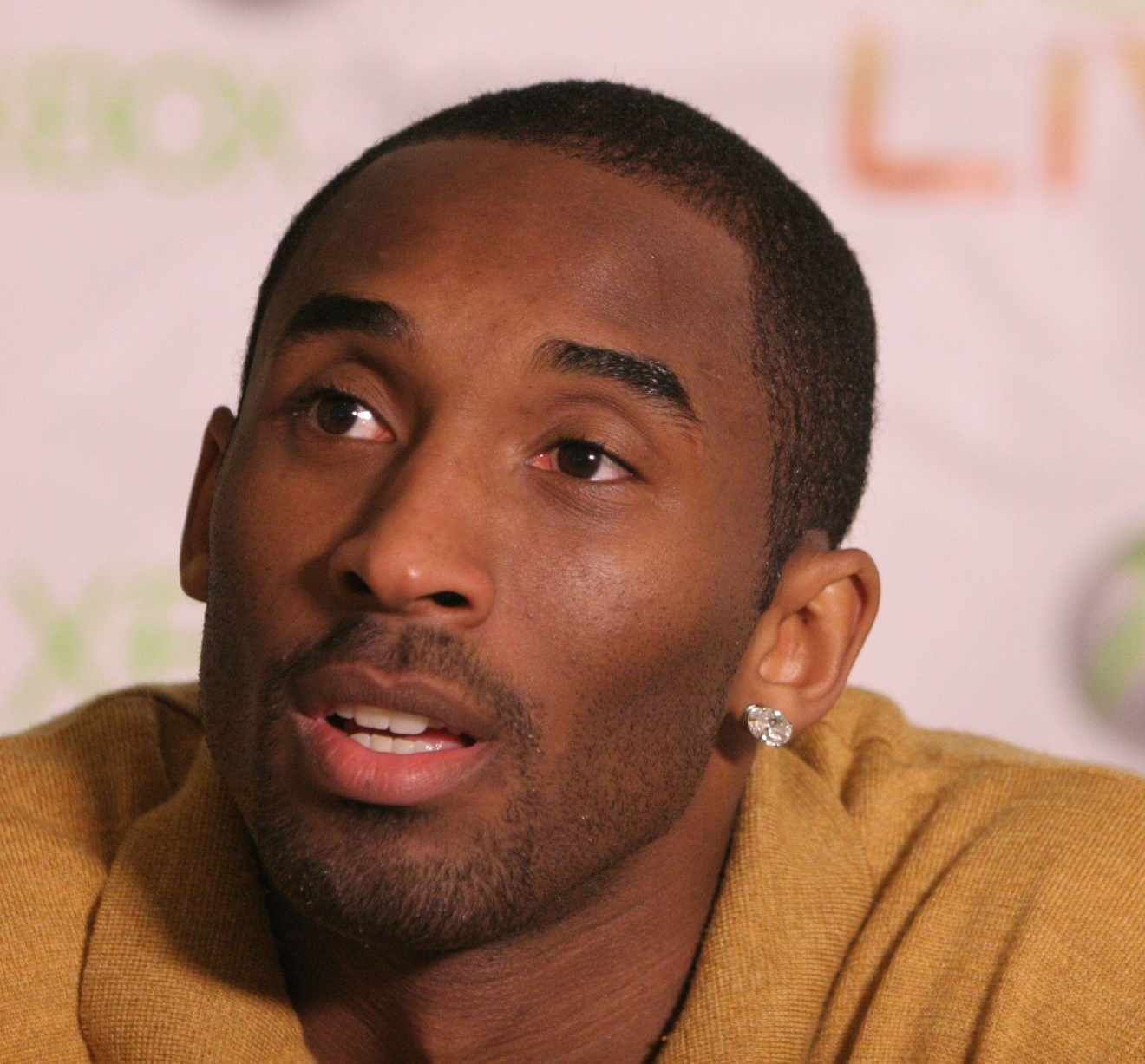
Kobe Bryant in 2006

Kobe Bryant was a shooting guard for the Los Angeles Lakers of the National Basketball Association (NBA) for his entire 20-year career. Selected 13th overall by the Charlotte Hornets in the 1996 NBA draft, Bryant was traded to the Los Angeles Lakers for Vlade Divac a month later. He and then-teammate Shaquille O'Neal led the Lakers to three consecutive NBA championships from 2000 to 2002. After O'Neal was traded to the Miami Heat following the 2003–04 season, Bryant became the cornerstone of the Lakers franchise. He led the NBA in scoring during the 2005–06 and 2006–07 seasons. In 2006, Bryant scored a career-high 81 points against the Toronto Raptors, the third-highest number of points scored in a game in NBA history, behind only Wilt Chamberlain's 100 point performance and Bam Adebayo's 83 points. It was the highest output for a guard ever. Bryant was awarded the regular season's Most Valuable Player Award (MVP) in the 2007–08 season and led his team to the 2008 NBA Finals as the first seed in the Western Conference. As a member of the U.S. men's basketball team, Bryant was a two-time Olympic gold medalist starting with the 2008 Summer Olympics ("The Redeem Team") and following with the 2012 Summer Olympics team. He led the Lakers to two more championships in 2009 and 2010, winning the Finals MVP award on both occasions.

Bryant currently ranks fourth both on the league's all-time post-season scoring and all-time regular-season scoring lists. He has been selected to 15 All-NBA Team (eleven times to the All-NBA First Team) and 12 All-Defensive Team (nine times to the All-Defensive First Team). He was selected to play in the NBA All-Star Game on 18 occasions, winning All-Star MVP Awards in 2002, 2007, 2009, and 2011 (he shared the 2009 award with Shaquille O'Neal). The award would be named after him in 2020. He also won the NBA Slam Dunk Contest as well as the Rookie Game scoring title in 1997. He has had 1 eighty-point game, 6 sixty-point games (including his final game), 26 fifty-point games, and 134 forty-point games in his career. Kobe had been also in a three-way tie with Stephen Curry and Donyell Marshall for most three-pointers with 12 in a game until November 8, 2016, when Curry set a new record with 13. In his final game on April 13, 2016, at 37 years old, he became the oldest player to score 60 points in a single game and set the highest point total in the 2015–16 regular season.

== NBA career statistics ==
†	Denotes seasons in which the Lakers won an NBA Championship
*	Denotes seasons in which the Lakers reached the NBA Finals
^	Denotes seasons in which Bryant led the league
**Bold**	Denotes career-highs

=== Regular season ===
Season	Team	Games played	Games started	Minutes per game	Field goal percentage	3-point field goal percentage	Free throw percentage	Rebounds per game	Assists per game	Steals per game	Blocks per game	Points per game
1996–97	L.A. Lakers	71	6	15.5	.417	.375	.819	1.9	1.3	.7	.3	7.9
1997–98	L.A. Lakers	79	1	26.0	.428	.341	.794	3.1	2.5	.9	.5	15.4
1998–99	L.A. Lakers	50^	50	37.9	.465	.267	.839	5.3	3.8	1.4	**1.0**	19.9
1999–2000†	L.A. Lakers†	66	62	38.2	.468	.319	.821	6.3	4.9	1.6	.9	22.5
2000–01†	L.A. Lakers†	68	68	40.9	.464	.305	.853	5.9	5.0	1.7	.6	28.5
2001–02†	L.A. Lakers†	80	80	38.3	**.469**	.250	.829	5.5	5.5	1.5	.4	25.2
2002–03	L.A. Lakers	**82**^	**82**	**41.5**	.451	**.383**	.843	**6.9**	5.9	**2.2**	.8	30.0
2003–04*	L.A. Lakers*	65	64	37.6	.438	.327	.852	5.5	5.1	1.7	.4	24.0
2004–05	L.A. Lakers	66	66	40.7	.433	.339	.816	5.9	6.0	1.3	.8	27.6
2005–06	L.A. Lakers	80	80	41.0	.450	.347	.850	5.3	4.5	1.8	.4	**35.4**^
2006–07	L.A. Lakers	77	77	40.8	.463	.344	**.868**	5.7	5.4	1.4	.5	31.6^
2007–08*	L.A. Lakers*	**82**^	**82**	38.9	.459	.361	.840	6.3	5.4	1.8	.5	28.3
2008–09†	L.A. Lakers†	**82**^	**82**	36.1	.467	.351	.856	5.2	4.9	1.5	.5	26.8
2009–10†	L.A. Lakers†	73	73	38.8	.456	.329	.811	5.4	5.0	1.5	.3	27.0
2010–11	L.A. Lakers	**82**	**82**	33.9	.451	.323	.828	5.1	4.7	1.2	.1	25.3
2011–12	L.A. Lakers	58	58	38.5	.430	.303	.845	5.4	4.6	1.2	.3	27.9
2012–13	L.A. Lakers	78	78	38.6	.463	.324	.839	5.6	6.0	1.4	.3	27.3
2013–14	L.A. Lakers	6	6	29.5	.425	.188	.857	4.3	**6.3**	1.2	.2	13.8
2014–15	L.A. Lakers	35	35	34.5	.373	.293	.813	5.7	5.6	1.3	.2	22.3
2015–16	L.A. Lakers	66	66	28.2	.358	.285	.826	3.7	2.8	.9	.2	17.6
Career		1,346	1,198	36.1	.447	.329	.837	5.2	4.7	1.4	.5	25.0
All-Star		14	14	27.8	.507	.333	.806	4.9	4.5	2.6	.4	20.0

=== Playoffs ===
Season	Team	Games played	Games started	Minutes per g	Field goal percentage	3-point field goal percentage	Free throw percentage	Rebounds per game	Assists per game	Steals per game	Blocks per game	Points per game
1996–97	L.A. Lakers	9	0	14.8	.382	.261	.867	1.2	1.2	.3	.2	8.2
1997–98	L.A. Lakers	11	0	20.0	.408	.214	.689	1.9	1.5	.3	.7	8.7
1998–99	L.A. Lakers	8	8	39.4	.430	.348	.800	6.9	4.6	**1.9**	1.2	19.8
1999–2000†	L.A. Lakers†	22	22	39.0	.442	.344	.754	4.5	4.4	1.5	**1.5**	21.1
2000–01†	L.A. Lakers†	16	16	43.4	.469	.324	.821	**7.3**	**6.1**	1.6	.8	29.4
2001–02†	L.A. Lakers†	19	19	43.8	.434	.379	.759	5.8	4.6	1.4	.9	26.6
2002–03	L.A. Lakers	12	12	44.3	.432	**.403**	.827	5.1	5.2	1.2	.1	32.1^
2003–04*	L.A. Lakers*	22	22	44.2	.413	.247	.813	4.7	5.5	**1.9**	.3	24.5
2005–06	L.A. Lakers	7	7	**44.9**	**.497**	.400	.771	6.3	5.1	1.1	.4	27.9
2006–07	L.A. Lakers	5	5	43.0	.462	.357	**.919**	5.2	4.4	1.0	.4	**32.8**^
2007–08*	L.A. Lakers*	21	21	41.1	.479	.302	.809	5.7	5.6	1.7	.4	30.1^
2008–09†	L.A. Lakers†	**23**	**23**	40.9	.457	.349	.883	5.3	5.5	1.7	.9	30.2
2009–10†	L.A. Lakers†	**23**	**23**	40.1	.458	.374	.842	6.0	5.5	1.4	.7	29.2
2010–11	L.A. Lakers	10	10	35.4	.446	.293	.820	3.4	3.3	1.6	.3	22.8
2011–12	L.A. Lakers	12	12	39.7	.439	.283	.832	4.8	4.3	1.3	.2	30.0
Career		220	200	39.3	.448	.331	.816	5.1	4.7	1.4	.6	25.6

=== Career ranking ===
Career – season

- Points – 4th (33,643)
- Field goal attempts – 3rd (26,200)
- Field goals made – 5th (11,719)
- Field goals missed – 2nd (14,481)
- Free throws made – 3rd (8,378)
- Free throw attempts – 5th (10,011)
- Points per game – 12th (25.00)
- 3-point field goal attempts – 6th (5,546)
- Turnovers – 3rd (4,010)
- 40-point games - 3rd (135)
- 50-point games - 3rd (26)
- 60-point games - 2nd (6)
- 3-point field goals made – 12th (1,827)
- Steals – 14th (1,944)
- Minutes played – 6th (48,637)
- Steals per game – 92nd (1.44)
- Minutes per game – 41st (36.13)
- Games played – 11th – (1,346)
- Assists – 29th (6,306)
- Free throw % – 84th (.8369)
- Personal fouls – 39th (3,353)
- Defensive rebounds – 46th (5,548)
- Assists per game – 134th (4.69)
- Rebounds – 100th (7,047)
- Blocks – 180th (640)
- Offensive rebounds – 190th (1,499)

Career – playoffs

- 3-point field goal attempts – 3rd (882)
- 3-point field goals made – 6th (292)
- Field goal attempts – 3rd (4,499)
- Free throws made – 3rd (1,320)
- Points – 4th (5,640)
- Minutes played – 3rd (8,641)
- Turnovers – 3rd (647)
- Field goals made – 5th (66,014)

== NBA awards and accomplishments ==
Bryant in February 2007

- 5-time NBA champion: 2000, 2001, 2002, 2009, 2010

- 7 NBA Finals appearances: 2000, 2001, 2002, 2004, 2008, 2009, 2010

- 2-time NBA Finals MVP: 2009, 2010
- NBA Most Valuable Player: 2008
- 2-time scoring champion: 2006, 2007
- 18-time NBA All-Star: 1998, 2000, 2001, 2002, 2003, 2004, 2005, 2006, 2007, 2008, 2009, 2010, 2011, 2012, 2013, 2014, 2015, 2016

- 18 consecutive selections, 13 consecutive appearances (No All-Star game in 1999 due to a league-wide lockout)
- Missed the 2010, 2014 and 2015 games due to injury

- 4-time NBA All-Star Game MVP: 2002, 2007, 2009, 2011 (shared the 2009 award with Shaquille O'Neal)
- 15-time All-NBA Team selection:

- First team: 2002, 2003, 2004, 2006, 2007, 2008, 2009, 2010, 2011, 2012, 2013
- Second team: 2000, 2001
- Third team: 1999, 2005

- 12-time All-Defensive Team selection:

- First team: 2000, 2003, 2004, 2006, 2007, 2008, 2009, 2010, 2011
- Second team: 2001, 2002, 2012

- NBA All-Rookie Team selection:

- Second team: 1997

- NBA Slam Dunk Contest champion: 1997
- 17-time Player of the Month: December 2000, November 2001, January 2003, March 2004, January 2006, April 2006, December 2006, March 2007, April 2007, February 2008, April 2008, December 2008, January 2009, December 2009, March 2011, December/January 2012, February 2013

- Player of the Month was awarded separately to Eastern and Western Conference starting from the 2001–02 season.

- NBA regular season leader:

- games played: 1998–99 (50), 2007–08 (82), 2008–09 (82)
- usage percentage: 2005–06 (38.7), 2010–11 (35.1), 2011–12 (35.7)
- points: 2002–03 (2,461), 2005–06 (2,832, 7th in NBA history), 2006–07 (2,430), 2007–08 (2,323)
- points per game: 2005–06 (35.4, 8th in NBA history), 2006–07 (31.6)
- field goals attempted: 2005–06 (2,173), 2006–07 (1,757), 2007–08 (1,690), 2010–11 (1,639), 2011–12 (1336)
- field goals made: 2002–03 (868), 2005–06 (978), 2006–07 (813)

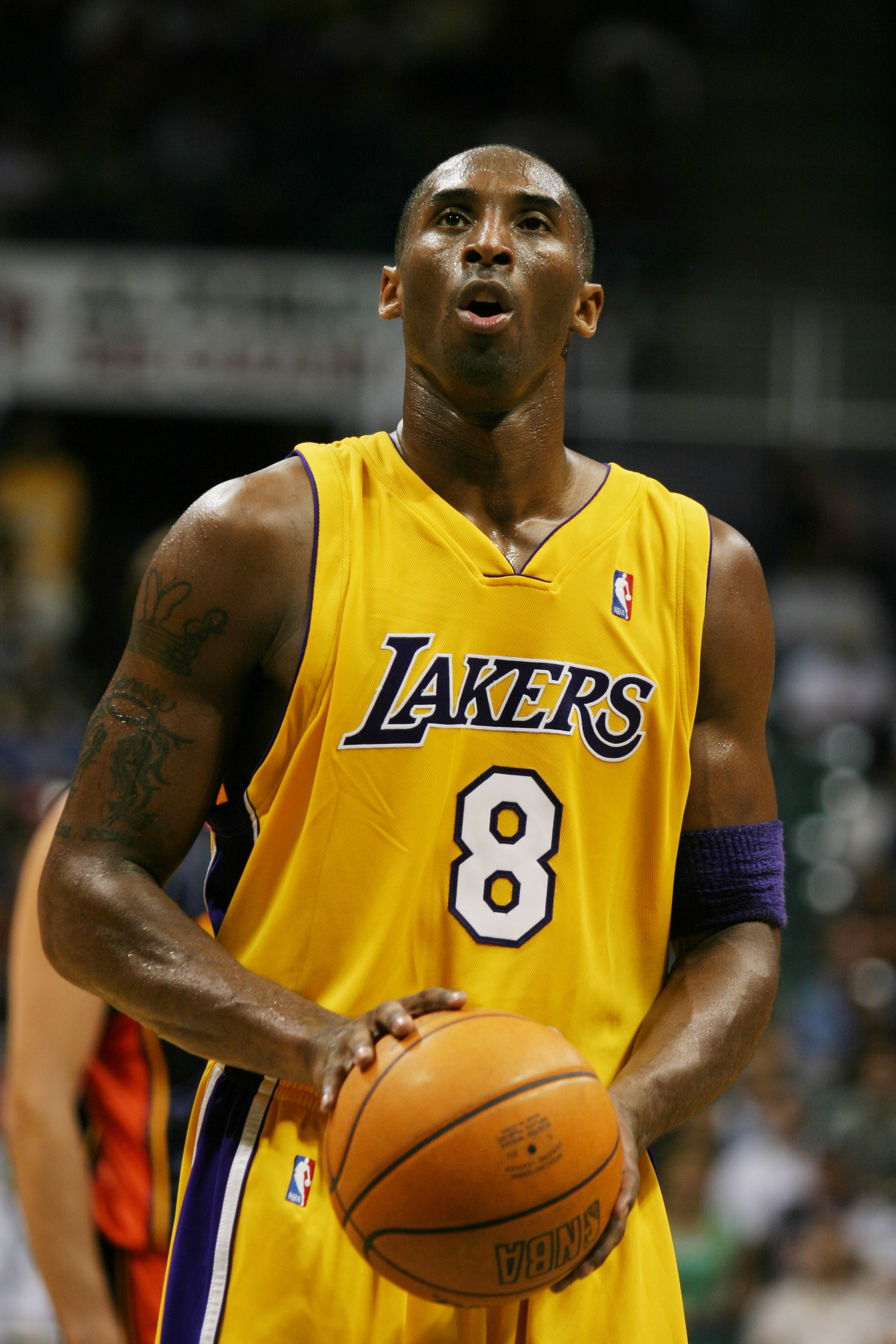
Bryant shooting a free throw vs. the Golden State Warriors, October 2005

- free throws attempted: 2006–07 (768)
- free throws made: 2005–06 (696), 2006–07 (667)

- 3rd most points in a game: 81 (on January 22, 2006, vs. the Toronto Raptors)
- 2nd most points in a half: 55 (On January 22, 2006, vs. the Toronto Raptors)
- 3rd most 40 point games: 135
- 3rd most 50 point games: 26
- 2nd most 60 point games: 6
- 2× Best NBA Player ESPY Award winner: 2008, 2010
- NBA playoffs leader:

- win shares: 2001 (3.8)
- points: 2004 (539), 2008 (633), 2009 (695), 2010 (671)
- points per game: 2003 (32.1), 2007 (32.8), 2008 (30.1)
- minutes played: 2002 (833), 2004 (973)
- field goals made: 2004 (190), 2008 (222), 2009 (242), 2010 (234)
- field goals attempted: 2002 (431), 2004 (460), 2008 (463), 2009 (530), 2010 (511)
- free throws made: 2004 (135), 2008 (157), 2009 (174), 2010 (154)
- free throws attempted: 2008 (194), 2010 (183)
- steals: 2000 (32), 2009 (38)
- turnovers: 2010 (79)
- personal fouls: 2000 (89)

== Game-winning shots ==
Number	Time left (seconds)	Score	Opponent	Date
1 (Playoffs)	0.0	101–100	Houston Rockets	May 9, 1999
2	10.0	108–106	Dallas Mavericks	December 27, 1999
3 (Playoffs)	2.6	97–95	Indiana Pacers	May 10, 2000
4 (Finals)	5.9	120–118	Indiana Pacers	June 14, 2000
5	(Reg) 2.3, (OT) 24.1	112–110	Sacramento Kings	November 16, 2000
6	2.8	85–83	Phoenix Suns	February 7, 2001
7	4.8	113–110	New Jersey Nets	February 13, 2001
8	5.5	87–86	Denver Nuggets	January 2, 2002
9	0.0	96–94	Charlotte Hornets	February 22, 2002
10	5.1	87–85	San Antonio Spurs	May 12, 2002
11	8.4	105–103	Dallas Mavericks	December 6, 2002
12	0.0	92–91	Denver Nuggets	December 22, 2002
13	0.0	102–101	Memphis Grizzlies	April 4, 2003
14	2.5	108–107	Denver Nuggets	December 19, 2003
15	31.0	101–100	Houston Rockets	March 3, 2004
16	0.0	105–104	Portland Trail Blazers	April 14, 2004
17	0.9	99–98	Memphis Grizzlies	December 4, 2005
18	11.4	100–99	Los Angeles Clippers	January 7, 2006
19	8.6	99–98	Cleveland Cavaliers	January 12, 2006
20 (Playoffs)	0.0	99–98	Phoenix Suns	April 30, 2006
21	1.0	103–101	Seattle SuperSonics	January 14, 2008
22 (Playoffs)	23.9	91–85	San Antonio Spurs	May 21, 2008
23	3.0	121–119	Indiana Pacers	January 9, 2009
24	27.0	105–100	Houston Rockets	January 13, 2009
25	0.0	108–107	Miami Heat	December 4, 2009
26	0.0	107–106	Milwaukee Bucks	December 16, 2009
27	0.0	109–108	Sacramento Kings	January 1, 2010
28	7.3	90–89	Boston Celtics	January 31, 2010
29	4.3	99–98	Memphis Grizzlies	February 23, 2010
30	1.9	109–107	Toronto Raptors	March 9, 2010
31	4.4	103–101	Portland Trail Blazers	March 21, 2010
32	12.4	88–87	Indiana Pacers	December 15, 2010
33	5.0	102–100	New Orleans Hornets	February 1, 2011
34	4.2	94–92	Toronto Raptors	February 12, 2012
35	1.0	91–90	New Orleans Hornets	March 14, 2012
36	20.2	88–85	New Orleans Hornets	March 31, 2012
37	9.0	99–98	Atlanta Hawks	March 3, 2013
38	10.6	118–116	Toronto Raptors	March 18, 2013
39	12.4	88–87	Indiana Pacers	January 4, 2015
40	31.0	101–96	Utah Jazz	April 13, 2016

== NBA records ==
=== Currently holds ===
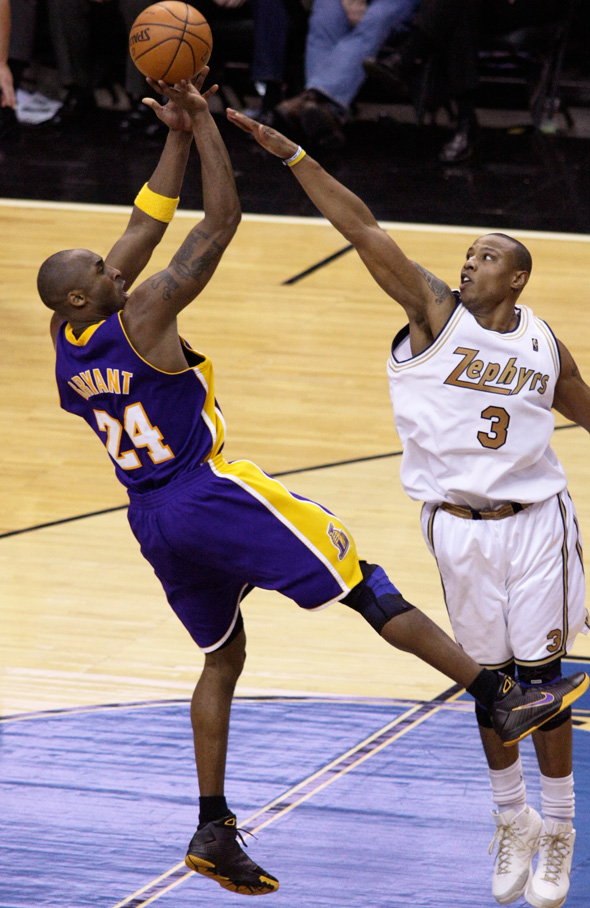
Bryant scored 50 points or more in four consecutive games in 2007.

Bryant holds or shares numerous NBA records:

- Most All-Star Game MVP awards won, career: 4 (tied with Bob Pettit)
- Most offensive rebounds in an All-Star Game: 10
- 2nd most All-NBA Team honors won, career: 15
- 2nd most All-NBA First Team honors won, career: 11 (tied with Karl Malone)
- Most All-NBA Team honors won by a guard, career: 15
- Most All-NBA First Team honors won by a guard, career: 11
- 2nd most All-Defensive Team honors won, career: 12
- Most All-Defensive First Team honors won, career: 9 (tied with Michael Jordan, Gary Payton, and Kevin Garnett)
- Most free throws made, four-game playoff series: 51 (second round vs. Sacramento Kings, 2001)
- 3rd most points scored in a game in NBA history (81 points)
- 2nd most points scored in a game in modern era of basketball (81 points)
- 3rd most points scored as an opponent at Madison Square Garden (61 points)
- Most points scored as an opponent at the current Madison Square Garden (61 points)
- Most points scored in one arena, career: 16,161 (as of April 14, 2016, at Staples Center, Los Angeles)
- Most games played at one arena, career: 599 (as of April 14, 2016, at Staples Center, Los Angeles
- Most career points for a guard: 33,643
- Highest Score against rest of teams in the league above 40 (share with Bob Pettit)

- Surpassed Hakeem Olajuwon, the previous holder of the record

- Youngest player to be named to the NBA All-Rookie Team: (1996–97)
- 2nd youngest player to be named to the NBA All-Defensive Team: (1999–2000 season)
- Youngest player to be named to the NBA All-Defensive First Team
- Youngest player to start a game: (18 years, 158 days)
- Youngest player to win the NBA Slam Dunk Championship: (18 years, 169 days)
- Youngest player to start an All-Star game: (19 years, 169 days)
- Youngest player to score in an All-Star game
- Youngest player to score in a Playoff game
- Youngest player to score a 3-pointer in a Playoff game
- Youngest player to score 30+ points in a game as a reserve
- Youngest player to win 3 championships
- Youngest player to appear in 1,000 NBA games (31 yrs, 177 days)
- Only player in NBA history to score at least 600 points in the postseason for three consecutive years.

- 633 (2008), 695 (2009), 671 (2010)

- Only player in NBA history to retire two jersey numbers in a single franchise team (8 and 24)
- Only player to outscore a team in three quarters since the introduction of shot clock
- Only player to record a triple-double with at least 30 points at age 36 or older
- Only player in NBA history to record 47 points, 8 rebounds, 5 assists, 4 blocks, and 3 steals in an NBA game
- Only player to lead an All-Star game in votes during his final career season
- Oldest player to score 60+ points, one game: (37 years, 234 days)
- Oldest player to record back-to-back games of 40+ points and 10+ assists (34 yrs, 197 days)
- Oldest player to put up a 30-point triple-double (36 yrs, 99 days)
- Oldest player to score 30 or more points in 10+ consecutive games (34 yrs)

=== Previously held ===
Most All-NBA Total Selections won, career: 15 (tied with Kareem Abdul-Jabbar and Tim Duncan) - Surpassed by LeBron James (16), 2020

- Most three-point field goals made, one game: 12 (on January 7, 2003, vs. Seattle SuperSonics; shared with Donyell Marshall and Stephen Curry)
  - Surpassed by Stephen Curry (13) on November 7, 2016
  - Surpassed by Klay Thompson (14) on October 29, 2018.
- Most three-point field goals made, one half: 8 (on March 28, 2003, vs. Washington Wizards; shared with 5 other players)

- Broken by Deron Williams on March 8, 2013.

- Youngest player to score 23,000 points: (30 years, 171 days)
  - Surpassed by LeBron James (29 years, 95 days) on April 4, 2014
- Youngest player to score 22,000 points: (30 years, 99 days)

- Surpassed by LeBron James (29 years, 11 days) on January 10, 2014.

- Youngest player to score 20,000 points: (29 years, 122 days)

- Surpassed by LeBron James (28 years, 17 days) on January 16, 2013.
- Chamberlain (29 years, 134 days), Jordan (29 years, 326 days), Kevin Durant (29 years, 103 days), Bryant, and James are the only five players to reach the milestone before reaching the age of 30.

- Youngest player to score 18,000 points: (28 years, 156 days)

- Surpassed by LeBron James (27 years, 35 days) on February 3, 2012.

- Youngest player to score 15,000 points: (27 years, 136 days)

- Surpassed by LeBron James (25 years, 79 days) on March 19, 2010

- Youngest player to score 10,000 points: (24 years, 193 days) on March 4, 2003

- Surpassed by LeBron James (23 years, 59 days) on February 27, 2008

- Youngest player to appear in an NBA game: (18 years, 72 days) on November 3, 1996

- Surpassed by Jermaine O'Neal (18 years, 53 days) on December 5, 1996
- Then surpassed by Andrew Bynum (18 years, 9 days) on November 2, 2005

== Los Angeles Lakers franchise records ==
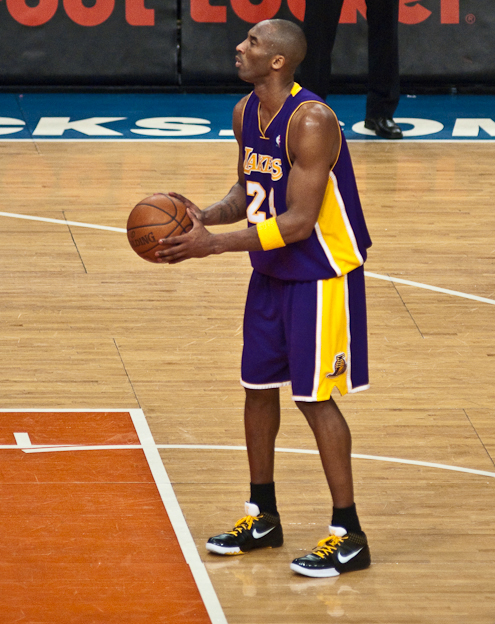
Bryant sets a modern Madison Square Garden record with 61 points in February 2, 2009. Later surpassed by New York Knicks Hall of Famer Carmelo Anthony in 2014

Bryant holds or shares numerous Lakers franchise records:

- Most seasons played

- 20 (1996–1997 to 2015–2016)

- Most playoff seasons played

- 15 (1997 – 2004, 2006 – 2012)

- Most All-Star Game Selections

- 18 (1998, 2000 – 2016)

- Most All-NBA First Team

- 11 (2002 – 2004, 2006 – 2013)

- Most All-Defensive First Team

- 9 (2000, 2003 – 2004, 2006 – 2011)

- Games

- Most career regular-season games played: 1,346
- Most career playoff games played: 220

- Points

- Career: 33,643
  - Surpassed Jerry West, the previous holder of the record, on February 1, 2010
- Career, playoffs: 5,640
  - Surpassed Jerry West, the previous holder of the record, on April 23, 2010)
- Season: 2,832 (2005–06)
- Game: 81 (on January 22, 2006 vs. Toronto Raptors)
- Half: 55 (2nd half, on January 22, 2006 vs. Toronto Raptors)
- Quarter: 30 (twice, most recently on November 30, 2006 in 3rd quarter vs. Utah Jazz)
- Games scoring 60 points or more, career: 6
- Games scoring 50 points or more, career: 26
- Games scoring 50 points or more, season: 10 (2006–07)
- Games scoring 40 points or more, career: 134
- Games scoring 40 points or more, season: 27 (2005–06)

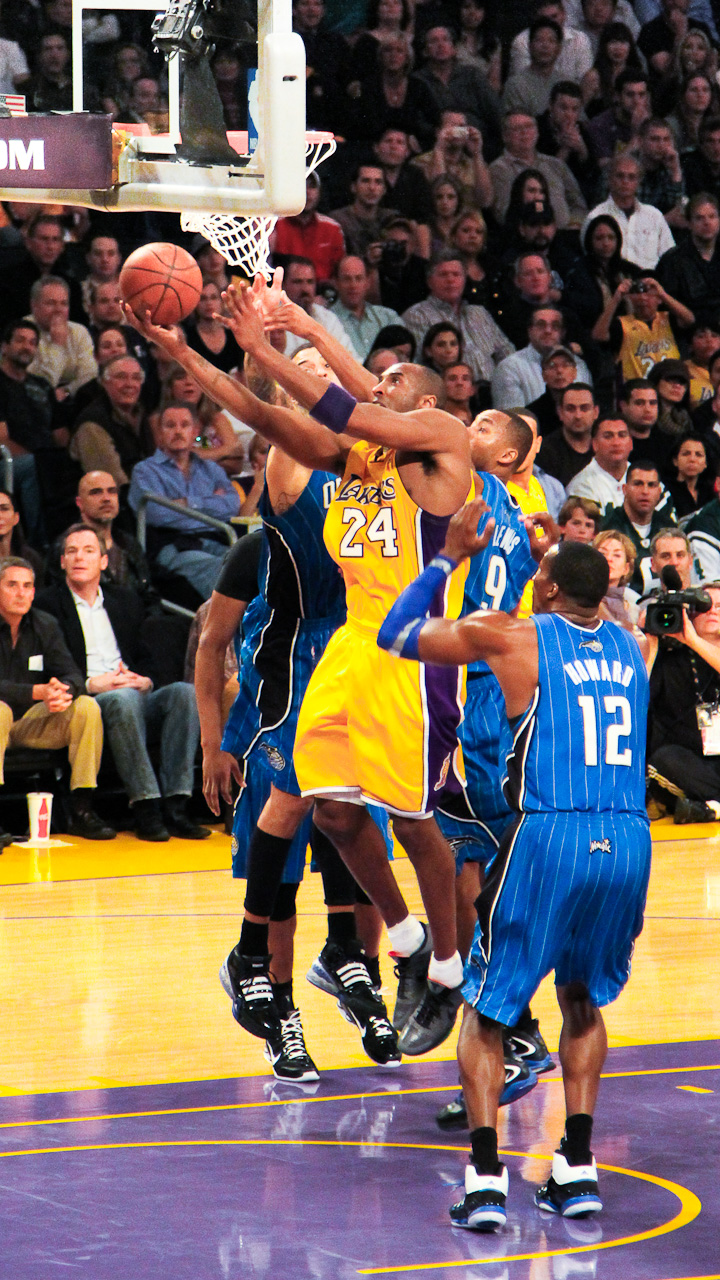
Bryant goes in for a layup in a 2010 game against the Magic.

- Consecutive games of 50 points or more: 4 (March 16–23, 2007)
  - Behind Wilt Chamberlain (7 consecutive games five times in 1961–62)
- Consecutive games of 40 points or more: 9 (February 6–23, 2003)
  - Tied with Michael Jordan (1986–87) and behind Wilt Chamberlain (14 consecutive games twice in 1961–62 and 10 consecutive games in 1962–63)

- Field goals made and attempted

- Career attempts: 26,200
- Career: 11,719
- Career, playoffs: 2,014
- Career attempts, playoffs: 4,499
- Half: 18 (2nd half, on January 22, 2006 vs. Toronto Raptors)
- Half attempts: 28 (tied with Elgin Baylor; on November 17, 2002 at Boston Celtics)
- Half, playoffs: 12 (tied with Elgin Baylor; on April 20, 2003 at Minnesota Timberwolves)
- Quarter: 11 (twice, most recently on January 22, 2006 vs. Toronto Raptors)
- Quarter attempts, playoffs: 13 (tied with 3 players; on May 13, 2003 at San Antonio Spurs)

- Free throws made and attempted

- Career: 8,378
- Career attempts: 10,011
- Career, playoffs: 1,320
- Career attempts, playoffs: 1,617
- Game, playoffs: 21 (on May 4, 2008 vs. Utah Jazz)
- Quarter, playoffs: 11 (tied with 3 players; on May 8, 1997 vs. Utah Jazz)
- Most free throws in a game without a miss, playoffs: 18 (May 18, 2012)
- Consecutive: 62 (January 11–22, 2006)

- Three-point field goals made and attempted

- Career: 1,827
- Career, playoffs: 292
- Game: 12 (on January 7, 2003 vs. Seattle SuperSonics)
- Half: 8 (1st half, on March 28, 2003 vs. Washington Wizards)
- Consecutive: 9 (on January 7, 2003 vs. Seattle SuperSonics)
- Career attempts: 5,546
- Career attempts, playoffs: 882
- Season attempts: 518 (2005–06)
- Game attempts: 18 (on January 7, 2003 vs. Seattle SuperSonics)

- Steals

- Career: 1,944
- Half: 6 (tied with 3 players; on February 13, 2006 vs. Utah Jazz)
- Quarter, playoffs: 3 (five times, tied with 9 players; most recently on June 15, 2008 vs. Boston Celtics)

- Minutes played

- Career: 48,637
- Career, playoffs: 8,641

- Personal Fouls

- Career: 3,353
- Career, playoffs: 660

- Turnovers

- Career: 4,010

== Miscellaneous records ==
- Most points scored as an opponent at the modern Madison Square Garden (IV): 61 (on February 2, 2009, vs. New York Knicks)
- Most points scored in Christmas Day games: 395 (as of December 25, 2015)

- Surpassed Oscar Robertson

- Most points scored in final career game: 60 (on April 13, 2016, vs. Utah Jazz)

== Others ==
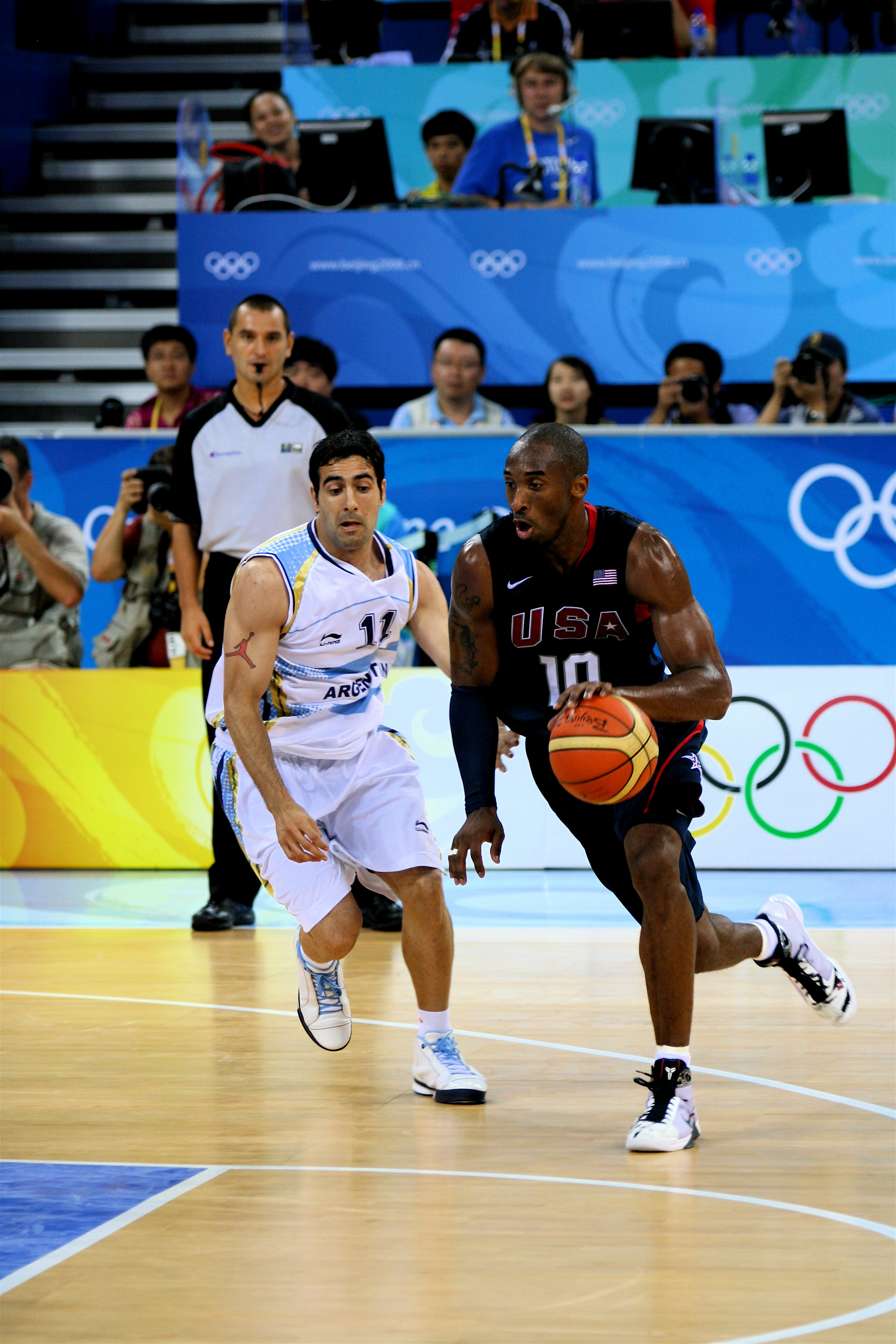
Bryant playing at the 2008 Summer Olympics

- 1995 Adidas Academic Betterment and Career Development (ABCD) Summer Camp Senior MVP
- 1996 Naismith High School Player of the Year
- 1996 Gatorade Circle of Champions High School Player of the Year
- 1996 McDonald's High School All-American
- 1996 USA Today All-USA First Team
- 1996 Associated Press Pennsylvania Big School Player of the Year
- USA Today and PARADE's 1996 National High School Player of the Year with a seasonal average of 30.8 points, 12.0 rebounds, 6.5 assists, 4.0 steals and 3.8 blocks per game.
- Named Most Outstanding Player at the Beach Ball Classic in Myrtle Beach, South Carolina in his senior year
- All-time leading scorer in Southeastern Pennsylvania school history with 2,883 points
- Led Lower Merion High School to a 31–3 record, including 27 straight wins, and the Pennsylvania Interscholastic Athletic Association (PIAA) Class AAAA state title as a senior in 1996.
- #33 retired at Lower Merion High School in 2002
- Five-time ESPY Award winner:

- 2002 Outstanding Team Award (Los Angeles Lakers)
- 2006 Under Armour Undeniable Performance Award (Kobe Bryant's 81 points)
- 2008 Best NBA Player Award (Kobe Bryant, Los Angeles Lakers)
- 2009 Best Team Award (Los Angeles Lakers)
- 2010 Best NBA Player Award (Kobe Bryant, Los Angeles Lakers)

- Gold medal with Team USA, 2007 FIBA Americas Championship (Tournament of Americas)
- Gold medal with Team USA, 2008 Summer Olympics
- Gold medal with Team USA, 2012 Summer Olympics
- Sporting News NBA Athlete of the Decade (2000s)
- TNT NBA Player of the Decade (2000s)
- Ranked #1 in Dime Magazine's 2012 List: The 10 Best NBA Players Since 2000 (published in the February 2011 issue)
- Ranked #5 in SLAM Magazine's 2018 revision of the top 100 greatest players of all time (published in the January 2018 issue)
- 2018 Academy Award - Best Animated Short Film (as a producer of Dear Basketball)
- Inducted into the inaugural Orange County Hall of Fame

Bryant signed No. 8 jersey and basketball on display at a 2022 NBA All-Star Game event in Cleveland, Ohio

== See also ==
- List of National Basketball Association career games played leaders
- List of National Basketball Association career scoring leaders
- List of National Basketball Association career assists leaders
- List of National Basketball Association career steals leaders
- List of National Basketball Association career turnovers leaders
- List of National Basketball Association career 3-point scoring leaders
- List of National Basketball Association career free throw scoring leaders
- List of National Basketball Association career minutes played leaders
- List of National Basketball Association career triple-double leaders
- List of National Basketball Association career playoff scoring leaders
- List of National Basketball Association career playoff assists leaders
- List of National Basketball Association career playoff steals leaders
- List of National Basketball Association career playoff turnovers leaders
- List of National Basketball Association career playoff 3-point scoring leaders
- List of National Basketball Association career playoff free throw scoring leaders
- List of National Basketball Association single-game playoff scoring leaders
- List of National Basketball Association players with most points in a game
- List of National Basketball Association franchise career scoring leaders
- List of National Basketball Association seasons played leaders
- List of NBA players who have spent their entire career with one franchise
- List of NBA players with most championships
