= 2005–06 Toronto Raptors season =

NBA professional basketball team season

- Head coach: Sam Mitchell
- Owners: Maple Leaf Sports & Entertainment
- Arena: Air Canada Centre

Results
- Record: 27–55 (.329)
- Place: Division: 4th (Atlantic); Conference: 12th (Eastern)
- Playoff finish: Did not qualify
- Stats at Basketball Reference

Local media
- Television: Rogers Sportsnet; Raptors NBA TV; TSN; The Score; Global; Sun TV
- Radio: CJCL

The 2005-2006 NBA season was the Raptors' eleventh season in the National Basketball Association. In the 2005 offseason, the Raptors selected Charlie Villanueva and Joey Graham with the seventh and sixteenth pick, respectively, in the first found of the 2005 NBA draft. After the draft, the Raptors signed an undrafted José Calderón as a free agent. The Raptors started the regular season 1–15, and the team struggled the remainder of the season, playing sub .500 basketball. On January 26, 2006, the Raptors fired general manager Rob Babcock. Wayne Embry was named interim general manager, until the February 28, 2006 hiring of Phoenix Suns president and general manager Bryan Colangelo as the Raptors' new general manager. On February 3, 2006, the Raptors traded Jalen Rose, a first-round draft pick, and an undisclosed amount of cash to the New York Knicks in exchange for Antonio Davis, a move likely made to clear Jalen Rose's annual 16 million dollar salary from the team salary cap. Antonio Davis would play eight games for the Raptors before missing the next twelve games with a back injury. On March 23, 2006, the Raptors released Antonio Davis when team doctors diagnosed Davis' back injury as being season-ending.

The Raptors had the fifth best team offensive rating in the NBA.

In a game against the Los Angeles Lakers on January 22, 2006, L.A.'s Kobe Bryant scored 81 points against the Raptors, which was the second-most points scored in NBA history at the time until it was broken by Bam Adebayo's 83-point performance against the Washington Wizards in 2026.

== NBA draft ==
Round	Pick	Player	Position	Nationality	School/Club team
1	7	Charlie Villanueva	Power Forward	United States	UConn
1	16	Joey Graham	Small Forward	United States	Oklahoma State
2	41	Roko Ukić	Point Guard	Croatia	KK Split (Croatia and Adriatic League)
2	58	Uroš Slokar	Small Forward	Slovenia	Snaidero Udine (Italy)

== Roster ==
Toronto Raptors roster
Players

Pos.	No.	Player	Height	Weight	DOB	From
C	55	Rafael Araújo	6 ft 11 in (2.11 m)	275 lb (125 kg)	1980-08-12	BYU
G	12	Andre Barrett	5 ft 10 in (1.78 m)	172 lb (78 kg)	1982-02-21	Seton Hall
F	16	Matt Bonner	6 ft 10 in (2.08 m)	235 lb (107 kg)	1980-04-05	Florida
C	4	Chris Bosh	6 ft 11 in (2.11 m)	235 lb (107 kg)	1984-03-24	Georgia Tech
G	8	José Calderón	6 ft 3 in (1.91 m)	200 lb (91 kg)	1981-09-28	Spain
C	33	Antonio Davis	6 ft 9 in (2.06 m)	215 lb (98 kg)	1968-10-31	UTEP
F	14	Joey Graham	6 ft 7 in (2.01 m)	230 lb (104 kg)	1982-06-11	Oklahoma State
G	13	Mike James	6 ft 2 in (1.88 m)	188 lb (85 kg)	1975-06-23	Duquesne
G	2	Darrick Martin	5 ft 11 in (1.80 m)	170 lb (77 kg)	1971-03-06	UCLA
G	24	Morris Peterson	6 ft 7 in (2.01 m)	220 lb (100 kg)	1977-08-26	Michigan State
C	9	Pape Sow (DL)	6 ft 10 in (2.08 m)	250 lb (113 kg)	1981-11-22	Cal State Fullerton
F	31	Charlie Villanueva	6 ft 11 in (2.11 m)	232 lb (105 kg)	1984-08-24	Connecticut
G	20	Alvin Williams	6 ft 5 in (1.96 m)	185 lb (84 kg)	1974-08-06	Villanova
F	17	Eric Williams	6 ft 8 in (2.03 m)	220 lb (100 kg)	1972-07-17	Providence
C	3	Loren Woods	7 ft 2 in (2.18 m)	260 lb (118 kg)	1978-06-21	Arizona

Coaches
Head coach
- Sam Mitchell
Assistant(s)
- Alex English
- Gene Keady
- Jim Todd
- Jay Triano

Legend
- (DP) Unsigned draft pick
- (FA) Free agent
- (S) Suspended
- (DL) On assignment to D-League affiliate
- Injured

Roster
Updated: March 27, 2006

== Regular season ==
=== Standings ===
Atlantic Division	W	L	PCT	GB	Home	Road	Div
y-New Jersey Nets	49	33	.598	-	29–12	20–21	10–6
Philadelphia 76ers	38	44	.463	11	23–18	15–26	10–6
Boston Celtics	33	49	.402	16	21–20	12–29	10–6
Toronto Raptors	27	55	.329	22	15–26	12–29	6–10
New York Knicks	23	59	.280	26	15–26	8–33	4–12

Eastern Conference
#	Team	W	L	PCT	GB
1	z-Detroit Pistons	64	18	.780	-
2	y-Miami Heat	52	30	.634	12
3	y-New Jersey Nets	49	33	.598	15
4	x-Cleveland Cavaliers	50	32	.610	14
5	x-Washington Wizards	42	40	.512	22
6	x-Indiana Pacers	41	41	.500	23
7	x-Chicago Bulls	41	41	.500	23
8	x-Milwaukee Bucks	40	42	.488	24
9	Philadelphia 76ers	38	44	.463	26
10	Orlando Magic	36	46	.439	28
11	Boston Celtics	33	49	.402	31
12	Toronto Raptors	27	55	.329	37
13	Charlotte Bobcats	26	56	.317	38
14	Atlanta Hawks	26	56	.317	38
15	New York Knicks	23	59	.280	41

=== Game log ===
2005–06 game log
November: 1–15 (home: 1–8; road: 0–7)

Game	Date	Team	Score	High points	High rebounds	High assists	Location Attendance	Record
1	November 2	Washington	L 96–99	Jalen Rose (20)	Chris Bosh (14)	Mike James (7)	Air Canada Centre; 18,106	0–1
2	November 4	New Jersey	L 92–102	José Calderón, Morris Peterson (20)	Morris Peterson (8)	José Calderón (7)	Air Canada Centre; 18,586	0–2
3	November 5	@ Detroit	L 84–117	Jalen Rose (25)	Chris Bosh, Jalen Rose (7)	José Calderón (10)	The Palace of Auburn Hills; 22,076	0–3
4	November 7	Cleveland	L 93–105	Chris Bosh (26)	Chris Bosh (12)	José Calderón (7)	Air Canada Centre; 18,281	0–4
5	November 11	Utah	L 84–99	Chris Bosh (19)	Chris Bosh (10)	José Calderón, Mike James (4)	Air Canada Centre; 15,617	0–5
6	November 13	Seattle	L 121–126 (OT)	Mike James (36)	Charlie Villanueva (12)	José Calderón (12)	Air Canada Centre; 15,033	0–6
7	November 15	@ Philadelphia	L 92–104	Charlie Villanueva (27)	Chris Bosh (17)	Jalen Rose (5)	Wachovia Center; 12,211	0–7
8	November 16	Philadelphia	L 115–121	Mike James (38)	Chris Bosh (10)	Mike James (9)	Air Canada Centre; 16,490	0–8
9	November 18	@ Boston	L 93–100	Chris Bosh (24)	Chris Bosh (14)	Mike James (7)	TD Banknorth Garden; 17,002	0–9
10	November 20	Miami	W 107–94	Chris Bosh (27)	Chris Bosh, Charlie Villanueva (12)	José Calderón (9)	Air Canada Centre; 17,594	1–9
11	November 22	@ Phoenix	L 82–90	Chris Bosh (23)	Chris Bosh, Charlie Villanueva (8)	Mike James (6)	America West Arena; 16,259	1–10
12	November 23	@ L.A. Clippers	L 100–103	Chris Bosh (24)	Chris Bosh (9)	Mike James (8)	Staples Center; 15,927	1–11
13	November 25	@ Sacramento	L 104–106	Chris Bosh (22)	Morris Peterson (9)	José Calderón, Jalen Rose (6)	ARCO Arena; 17,317	1–12
14	November 26	@ Golden State	L 91–117	Chris Bosh, Morris Peterson (21)	Morris Peterson (8)	José Calderón (6)	The Arena in Oakland; 17,119	1–13
15	November 28	Dallas	L 91–93	Chris Bosh (26)	Chris Bosh (10)	José Calderón (8)	Air Canada Centre; 15,789	1–14
16	November 30	Memphis	L 66–92	Chris Bosh (15)	Chris Bosh (8)	José Calderón (7)	Air Canada Centre; 14,993	1–15

December: 7–7 (home: 1–4; road: 6–3)

Game	Date	Team	Score	High points	High rebounds	High assists	Location Attendance	Record
17	December 2	@ Atlanta	W 102–101	Chris Bosh (23)	Charlie Villanueva (10)	Mike James (7)	Philips Arena; 12,261	2–15
18	December 3	@ New Jersey	W 95–82	Chris Bosh (29)	Chris Bosh (13)	José Calderón (8)	Continental Airlines Arena; 14,613	3–15
19	December 6	@ Washington	L 111–119 (OT)	Chris Bosh (27)	Chris Bosh, José Calderón (9)	José Calderón (13)	MCI Center; 12,401	3–16
20	December 7	L.A. Lakers	L 91–102	Chris Bosh (22)	Chris Bosh (10)	Chris Bosh (6)	Air Canada Centre; 18,821	3–17
21	December 10	@ Charlotte	W 111–103	Chris Bosh (30)	Chris Bosh (11)	Mike James (6)	Charlotte Bobcats Arena; 15,163	4–17
22	December 14	Chicago	L 94–105	Chris Bosh (25)	Morris Peterson (7)	José Calderón, Mike James (6)	Air Canada Centre; 16,169	4–18
23	December 16	Golden State	L 98–108	Chris Bosh (27)	Charlie Villanueva (9)	José Calderón (11)	Air Canada Centre; 15,829	4–19
24	December 18	Philadelphia	L 80–107	Chris Bosh (22)	Rafael Araújo, Chris Bosh, Morris Peterson, Charlie Villanueva (7)	Morris Peterson (4)	Air Canada Centre; 18,918	4–20
25	December 19	@ Orlando	W 92–90	Chris Bosh, Morris Peterson (19)	Chris Bosh (12)	Darrick Martin (7)	TD Waterhouse Centre; 12,511	5–20
26	December 21	@ Houston	W 94–81	Mike James (19)	Chris Bosh (8)	José Calderón, Morris Peterson (7)	Toyota Center; 14,901	6–20
27	December 23	@ San Antonio	L 90–95	Jalen Rose (19)	Morris Peterson (11)	José Calderón (5)	SBC Center; 18,797	6–21
28	December 27	@ Detroit	L 106–113	Chris Bosh (37)	Chris Bosh (11)	Chris Bosh (5)	The Palace of Auburn Hills; 22,076	6–22
29	December 28	Atlanta	W 108–102	Mike James (28)	Chris Bosh, Mike James (6)	Mike James (9)	Air Canada Centre; 18,326	7–22
30	December 30	@ Indiana	W 99–97	Charlie Villanueva (25)	Chris Bosh (12)	Mike James (10)	Conseco Fieldhouse; 18,345	8–22

January: 7–8 (home: 5–2; road: 2–6)

Game	Date	Team	Score	High points	High rebounds	High assists	Location Attendance	Record
31	January 3	@ Atlanta	W 108–97	Mike James (28)	Chris Bosh (10)	Mike James (6)	Philips Arena; 10,048	9–22
32	January 4	Orlando	W 121–97	Charlie Villanueva (24)	Rafael Araújo (9)	Mike James (7)	Air Canada Centre; 14,085	10–22
33	January 6	Houston	W 112–92	Mike James (30)	Chris Bosh (16)	Mike James (8)	Air Canada Centre; 17,460	11–22
34	January 8	New Jersey	L 104–105	Chris Bosh (27)	Matt Bonner (8)	Mike James (7)	Air Canada Centre; 18,935	11–23
35	January 9	@ Chicago	L 104–113	Chris Bosh (26)	Matt Bonner (9)	Mike James (13)	United Center; 21,103	11–24
36	January 11	Charlotte	W 95–86	Chris Bosh (29)	Morris Peterson (11)	Mike James (7)	Air Canada Centre; 14,098	12–24
37	January 15	New York	W 129–103	Jalen Rose (31)	Chris Bosh, Charlie Villanueva (6)	José Calderón (10)	Air Canada Centre; 17,393	13–24
38	January 17	@ Utah	L 98–111	Chris Bosh (27)	Matt Bonner, Chris Bosh (6)	José Calderón, Mike James (3)	Delta Center; 17,831	13–25
39	January 18	@ Portland	L 94–96	Jalen Rose (23)	Chris Bosh (9)	Mike James (7)	Rose Garden; 12,315	13–26
40	January 20	@ Seattle	W 121–113	Chris Bosh (29)	Chris Bosh (13)	Jalen Rose (7)	KeyArena; 15,261	14–26
41	January 22	@ L.A. Lakers	L 104–122	Mike James (26)	Chris Bosh (8)	Mike James (10)	Staples Center; 18,997	14–27
42	January 23	@ Denver	L 101–107	Mike James (22)	Matt Bonner (9)	Chris Bosh, Mike James (4)	Pepsi Center; 14,826	14–28
43	January 25	Chicago	L 88–104	Chris Bosh (20)	Chris Bosh (7)	Mike James (7)	Air Canada Centre; 14,198	14–29
44	January 27	@ Milwaukee	L 87–108	Chris Bosh (21)	Charlie Villanueva (6)	José Calderón (7)	Bradley Center; 14,867	14–30
45	January 29	Sacramento	W 124–123 (OT)	Morris Peterson (23)	Morris Peterson (10)	José Calderón (5)	Air Canada Centre; 16,573	15–30

February: 5–6 (home: 3–2; road: 2–4)

Game	Date	Team	Score	High points	High rebounds	High assists	Location Attendance	Record
46	February 1	Washington	W 117–112	Chris Bosh (33)	Chris Bosh (13)	Chris Bosh, José Calderón, Mike James, Jalen Rose (4)	Air Canada Centre; 13,640	16–30
47	February 3	New York	W 104–90	Chris Bosh (29)	Charlie Villanueva (9)	Mike James (10)	Air Canada Centre; 15,858	17–30
48	February 5	L.A. Clippers	L 113–115 (OT)	Chris Bosh (29)	Chris Bosh (16)	Mike James (7)	Air Canada Centre; 15,541	17–31
49	February 8	San Antonio	L 118–125 (OT)	Mike James (36)	Chris Bosh (14)	Mike James (7)	Air Canada Centre; 19,284	17–32
50	February 10	@ Charlotte	W 88–73	Charlie Villanueva (24)	Chris Bosh, Morris Peterson (10)	Mike James (8)	Charlotte Bobcats Arena; 17,472	18–32
51	February 12	Portland	W 114–81	Morris Peterson (22)	Chris Bosh, Charlie Villanueva (9)	Mike James (6)	Air Canada Centre; 15,014	19–32
52	February 13	@ Minnesota	W 98–94	Mike James (27)	José Calderón, Antonio Davis (5)	Mike James (6)	Target Center; 14,911	20–32
53	February 15	@ New York	L 96–98	Chris Bosh (25)	Chris Bosh, Morris Peterson (7)	Mike James (9)	Madison Square Garden; 18,901	20–33
54	February 21	@ Memphis	L 88–94	Chris Bosh (26)	Charlie Villanueva (10)	José Calderón (7)	FedExForum; 15,385	20–34
55	February 25	@ Dallas	L 113–115 (OT)	Chris Bosh (29)	Chris Bosh (13)	Mike James (7)	American Airlines Center; 19,791	20–35
56	February 27	@ Miami	L 94–101	Mike James (26)	Charlie Villanueva (11)	Chris Bosh, José Calderón, Antonio Davis, Mike James, Morris Peterson (3)	American Airlines Arena; 19,600	20–36

March: 6–10 (home: 4–6; road: 2–4)

Game	Date	Team	Score	High points	High rebounds	High assists	Location Attendance	Record
57	March 1	Atlanta	L 111–113 (OT)	Chris Bosh (27)	Charlie Villanueva (11)	Chris Bosh (5)	Air Canada Centre; 15,137	20–37
58	March 4	@ New Jersey	L 100–105 (OT)	Morris Peterson (25)	Chris Bosh, Charlie Villanueva (11)	Mike James (7)	Continental Airlines Arena; 16,215	20–38
59	March 5	Boston	W 111–105	Morris Peterson (27)	Chris Bosh (10)	Mike James (6)	Air Canada Centre; 16,623	21–38
60	March 7	@ Cleveland	L 99–106	Mike James (31)	Charlie Villanueva (11)	Mike James (8)	Quicken Loans Arena; 18,077	21–39
61	March 8	Cleveland	L 97–98	Morris Peterson (31)	Chris Bosh (14)	Mike James (7)	Air Canada Centre; 19,800	21–40
62	March 10	Denver	L 97–108	Mike James (26)	Chris Bosh (15)	José Calderón (5)	Air Canada Centre; 17,806	21–41
63	March 12	Indiana	W 93–89	Morris Peterson (25)	Chris Bosh (8)	Mike James (4)	Air Canada Centre; 17,573	22–41
64	March 14	@ Philadelphia	W 111–97	Chris Bosh (31)	Charlie Villanueva (10)	Darrick Martin (12)	Wachovia Center; 14,917	23–41
65	March 15	Detroit	L 98–105	Mike James (24)	Chris Bosh (11)	Mike James (11)	Air Canada Centre; 19,800	23–42
66	March 17	Milwaukee	W 97–96	Chris Bosh (27)	Chris Bosh (10)	Mike James (6)	Air Canada Centre; 17,273	24–42
67	March 21	@ New York	W 114–109	Mike James (37)	Mike James, Charlie Villanueva (8)	Mike James (5)	Madison Square Garden; 18,131	25–42
68	March 22	@ Boston	L 96–110	Mike James (31)	Chris Bosh (11)	Chris Bosh (8)	TD Banknorth Garden; 18,624	25–43
69	March 24	Minnesota	W 97–77	Morris Peterson (21)	Chris Bosh (15)	Mike James (5)	Air Canada Centre; 17,493	26–43
70	March 26	@ Milwaukee	L 116–125 (OT)	Charlie Villanueva (48)	Charlie Villanueva (9)	Mike James (10)	Bradley Center; 16,317	26–44
71	March 29	Miami	L 94–98	Morris Peterson (28)	Charlie Villanueva (13)	Mike James (12)	Air Canada Centre; 19,973	26–45
72	March 31	Phoenix	L 126–140	Morris Peterson (38)	Pape Sow (15)	Mike James (10)	Air Canada Centre; 19,800	26–46

April: 1–9 (home: 1–4; road: 0–5)

Game	Date	Team	Score	High points	High rebounds	High assists	Location Attendance	Record
73	April 2	New Orleans/Oklahoma City	L 113–120 (2OT)	Morris Peterson (27)	Charlie Villanueva (18)	Mike James (10)	Air Canada Centre; 15,079	26–47
74	April 4	Boston	L 120–124	Morris Peterson (32)	Matt Bonner (13)	Andre Barrett, Morris Peterson (6)	Air Canada Centre; 16,598	26–48
75	April 5	@ Indiana	L 103–111	Mike James (34)	Mike James, Charlie Villanueva (11)	Mike James (8)	Conseco Fieldhouse; 14,037	26–49
76	April 7	@ New Orleans/Oklahoma City	L 89–95	Mike James (36)	Loren Woods (10)	Mike James (4)	Ford Center; 18,854	26–50
77	April 9	Charlotte	L 88–94	Mike James (32)	Joey Graham (9)	Mike James (10)	Air Canada Centre; 17,679	26–51
78	April 11	@ Miami	L 97–106	Mike James (32)	Darrick Martin, Charlie Villanueva (5)	Mike James (6)	American Airlines Arena; 19,600	26–52
79	April 12	@ Orlando	L 96–103	Morris Peterson (23)	Morris Peterson (8)	Mike James, Morris Peterson (5)	TD Waterhouse Centre; 15,009	26–53
80	April 14	Detroit	W 108–103	Mike James (39)	Loren Woods (11)	José Calderón (9)	Air Canada Centre; 19,800	27–53
81	April 17	Indiana	L 95–120	Morris Peterson (27)	Loren Woods (14)	José Calderón (8)	Air Canada Centre; 18,267	27–54
82	April 19	@ Chicago	L 106–127	Morris Peterson, Charlie Villanueva (29)	Charlie Villanueva (10)	José Calderón (5)	United Center; 20,364	27–55

2005–06 season schedule

== Player statistics ==
=== Regular season ===
Player	POS	GP	GS	MP	REB	AST	STL	BLK	PTS	MPG	RPG	APG	SPG	BPG	PPG
Morris Peterson	SG	82	77	3,140	381	190	104	15	1,374	38.3	4.6	2.3	1.3	.2	16.8
Charlie Villanueva	PF	81	36	2,361	521	88	60	63	1,053	29.1	6.4	1.1	.7	.8	13.0
Joey Graham	SF	80	24	1,581	244	60	37	13	533	19.8	3.1	.8	.5	.2	6.7
Mike James	PG	79	79	2,925	262	460	72	3	1,604	37.0	3.3	5.8	.9	.0	20.3
Matt Bonner	PF	78	6	1,710	284	56	49	31	583	21.9	3.6	.7	.6	.4	7.5
Chris Bosh	C	70	70	2,751	647	181	50	79	1,572	39.3	9.2	2.6	.7	1.1	22.5
José Calderón	SG	64	11	1,487	141	288	42	4	349	23.2	2.2	4.5	.7	.1	5.5
Rafael Araújo	C	52	34	601	144	15	24	6	121	11.6	2.8	.3	.5	.1	2.3
Jalen Rose^{†}	SF	46	22	1,236	129	113	20	10	557	26.9	2.8	2.5	.4	.2	12.1
Pape Sow	C	42	25	590	146	8	21	19	147	14.0	3.5	.2	.5	.5	3.5
Darrick Martin	PG	40	0	339	20	57	17	0	102	8.5	.5	1.4	.4	.0	2.6
Eric Williams	SF	28	11	352	50	15	7	2	91	12.6	1.8	.5	.3	.1	3.3
Loren Woods	C	27	4	324	110	4	9	23	62	12.0	4.1	.1	.3	.9	2.3
Andre Barrett^{†}	PG	17	0	261	22	50	10	0	78	15.4	1.3	2.9	.6	.0	4.6
Aaron Williams^{†}	C	14	3	99	15	1	4	3	25	7.1	1.1	.1	.3	.2	1.8
Antonio Davis^{†}	C	8	8	191	36	7	3	1	35	23.9	4.5	.9	.4	.1	4.4
Alvin Williams	PG	1	0	10	3	0	0	0	1	10.0	3.0	.0	.0	.0	1.0

- ^{†} Denotes player spent time with another team in the season. Stats reflect time with the Raptors only.

== Award winners ==
- Chris Bosh, NBA All-Star Game Appearance
- Charlie Villanueva, NBA All-Star Rookie-Sophomore Game Appearance (Rookie)
- Charlie Villanueva, NBA All-NBA Rookie First Team
