= Charlie Villanueva =

American basketball player (born 1984)

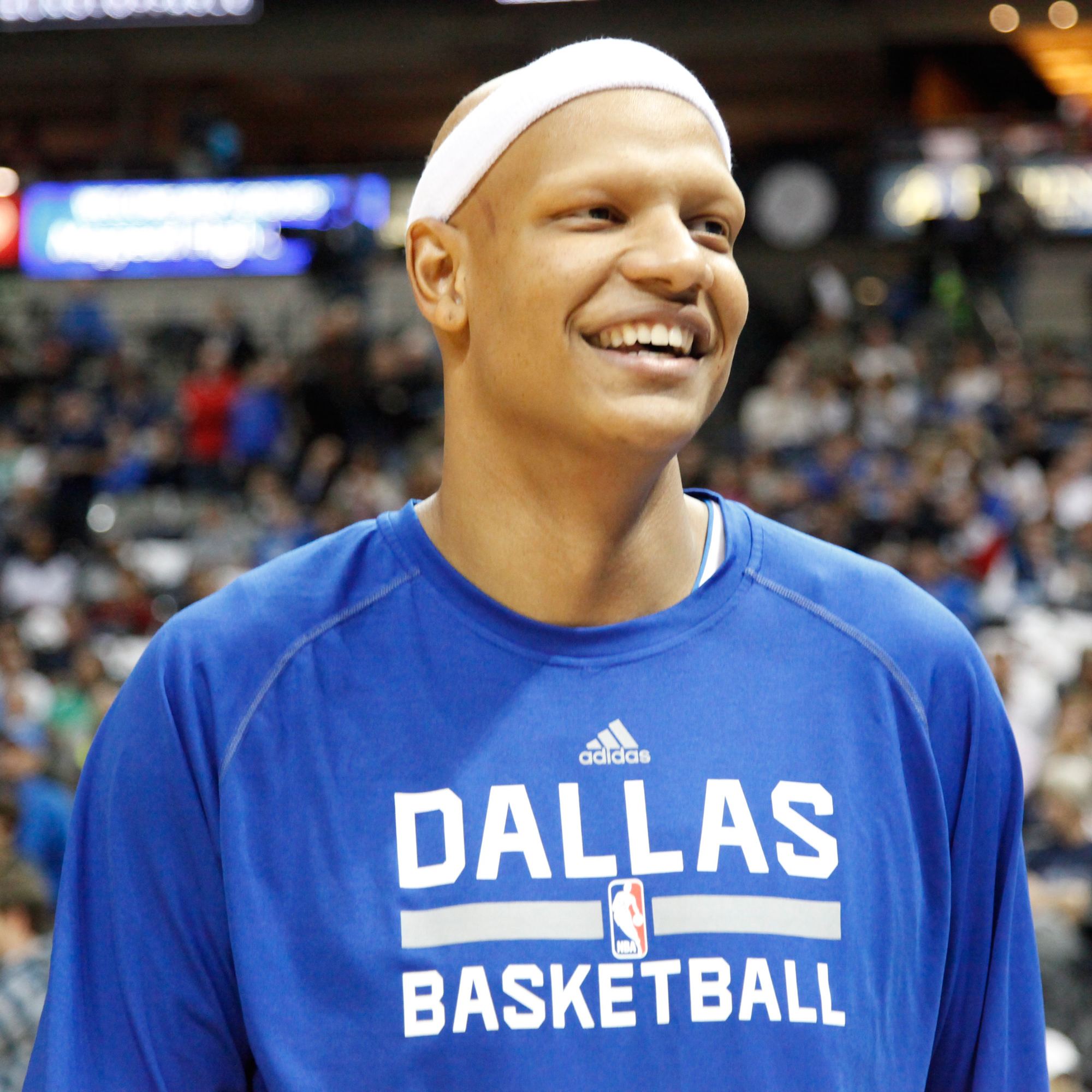
- Villanueva with the Dallas Mavericks in 2015

Personal information
- Born: August 24, 1984 (age 42) Queens, New York, U.S.
- Listed height: 6 ft 11 in (2.11 m)
- Listed weight: 232 lb (105 kg)

Career information
- High school: Newtown (Queens, New York); Blair Academy (Blairstown, New Jersey)
- College: UConn (2003–2005)
- NBA draft: 2005: 1st round, 7th overall pick
- Drafted by: Toronto Raptors
- Playing career: 2005–2016
- Position: Power forward
- Number: 31, 3

Career history
- 2005–2006: Toronto Raptors
- 2006–2009: Milwaukee Bucks
- 2009–2014: Detroit Pistons
- 2014–2016: Dallas Mavericks

Career highlights
- NBA All-Rookie First Team (2006); NCAA champion (2004); Second-team All-Big East (2005); Big East All-Rookie Team (2004); McDonald's All-American (2003)
- Stats at NBA.com
- Stats at Basketball Reference
Medals
Men's basketball
Representing Dominican Republic
FIBA AmeriCup
| Bronze medal – third place | 2011 Mar del Plata |
Centrobasket
| Silver medal – second place | 2010 Santo Domingo |
Representing the United States
FIBA Americas U20 Championship
| Gold medal – first place | 2004 Halifax |

Charlie Alexander Villanueva Mejia (born August 24, 1984) is an American-Dominican former professional basketball player who played for the Toronto Raptors, Milwaukee Bucks, Detroit Pistons and Dallas Mavericks of the National Basketball Association (NBA).

The son of immigrants from the Dominican Republic, Villanueva was raised in Elmhurst, Queens, New York City. He was drafted at the age of 20 with the seventh overall pick in the 2005 NBA draft by the Toronto Raptors. He also holds Dominican citizenship and has represented the Dominican Republic national team in international competitions.

== Personal life ==
Villanueva has an autoimmune skin disease known as alopecia universalis, a variation of alopecia areata. This prevents the growth of hair on the scalp and/or elsewhere on the body, but otherwise is not physically painful, dangerous, or life-threatening. Villanueva is a spokesman for the NAAF (National Alopecia Areata Foundation), and received the February 2006 Community Assist Award from the NBA for his work with the organization.

A first-generation Dominican-American, Villanueva is fluent in Spanish, as it is the language he speaks with his family.

Villanueva has three brothers, all named Roberto, a.k.a. Rob, after their father's name: Rob Antonio, Rob Elia, Rob Carlos. Announced in September 2015, Villanueva is working with two of the three brothers on a documentary titled "What is Alopecia", in order to continue his advocacy efforts to educate, create awareness and support the alopecia community.

Villanueva has two children from a first marriage.

Villanueva tied the knot a second time on July 24, 2021, in Dallas, Texas, after Villanueva proposed to Lala Alvarez on New Year’s Eve 2020 at Nick & Sam’s, a steakhouse where they had their very first date.

== High school career ==
During his freshman year, Villanueva attended Newtown High School in Queens, New York, where he was a teammate of future NBA player Smush Parker. He spent his next three years at Blair Academy in Blairstown, New Jersey, where he played with another future NBA player, Luol Deng. Villanueva received All-American honors as a senior and was named New Jersey Co-Player of the Year. He entered the 2003 NBA draft, but withdrew his eligibility so he could play college basketball for the University of Connecticut.

Considered a five-star recruit by Rivals.com, Villanueva was listed as the No. 2 power forward and the No. 5 player in the nation in 2003.

== College career ==
Villanueva originally gave a verbal commitment to play for the University of Illinois, but after Bill Self left the Illini for the University of Kansas, Villanueva withdrew his commitment. He considered following Self to the Jayhawks, but instead opted to play for the University of Connecticut.

In his freshman year at UConn, Villanueva earned Big East All-Rookie Team honors and was a key reserve member of the 2004 NCAA National Championship team. As a sophomore at UConn, he averaged 13.6 points and 8.3 rebounds, leading the team in scoring and receiving team MVP and second-team All-Big East honors. Villanueva declared for the 2005 NBA draft following his sophomore season, thus forgoing his final two years of college eligibility.

== Professional career ==
=== Toronto Raptors (2005–2006) ===
Villanueva was selected by the Toronto Raptors with the seventh overall pick in the 2005 NBA draft. Despite being panned by critics as soon as his name was called in the draft, Villanueva responded with a solid rookie season. He averaged 13.0 points and 6.4 rebounds in 81 games. He finished second among rookies in points and rebounds, and third in minutes and blocked shots. He also tallied 12 double-doubles and set the Raptors' rookie records for points (48) and rebounds (18) in a game. He also appeared in the Rookie Challenge and was named to the All-NBA Rookie first team.

=== Milwaukee Bucks (2006–2009) ===
On June 30, 2006, Villanueva was traded to the Milwaukee Bucks in exchange for T. J. Ford. (In 2026, Villanueva revealed that a girlfriend of one of his brothers at the time had shared advanced knowledge of the trade.) On April 9, 2008, Villanueva scored a season-high 38 points and made a career-high seven 3-point shots during a loss against his former team, the Raptors.

In March 2009, Villanueva was reprimanded by Bucks coach Scott Skiles for posting a message on his Twitter account during halftime of the Bucks–Celtics game. Despite the mishap, Villanueva's 2008–09 season turned out to be a career-best season for him as he averaged 16.2 points and 6.7 rebounds per game. On March 3, 2009, Villanueva scored 24 points and grabbed 15 rebounds during a loss to the New Jersey Nets.

=== Detroit Pistons (2009–2014) ===
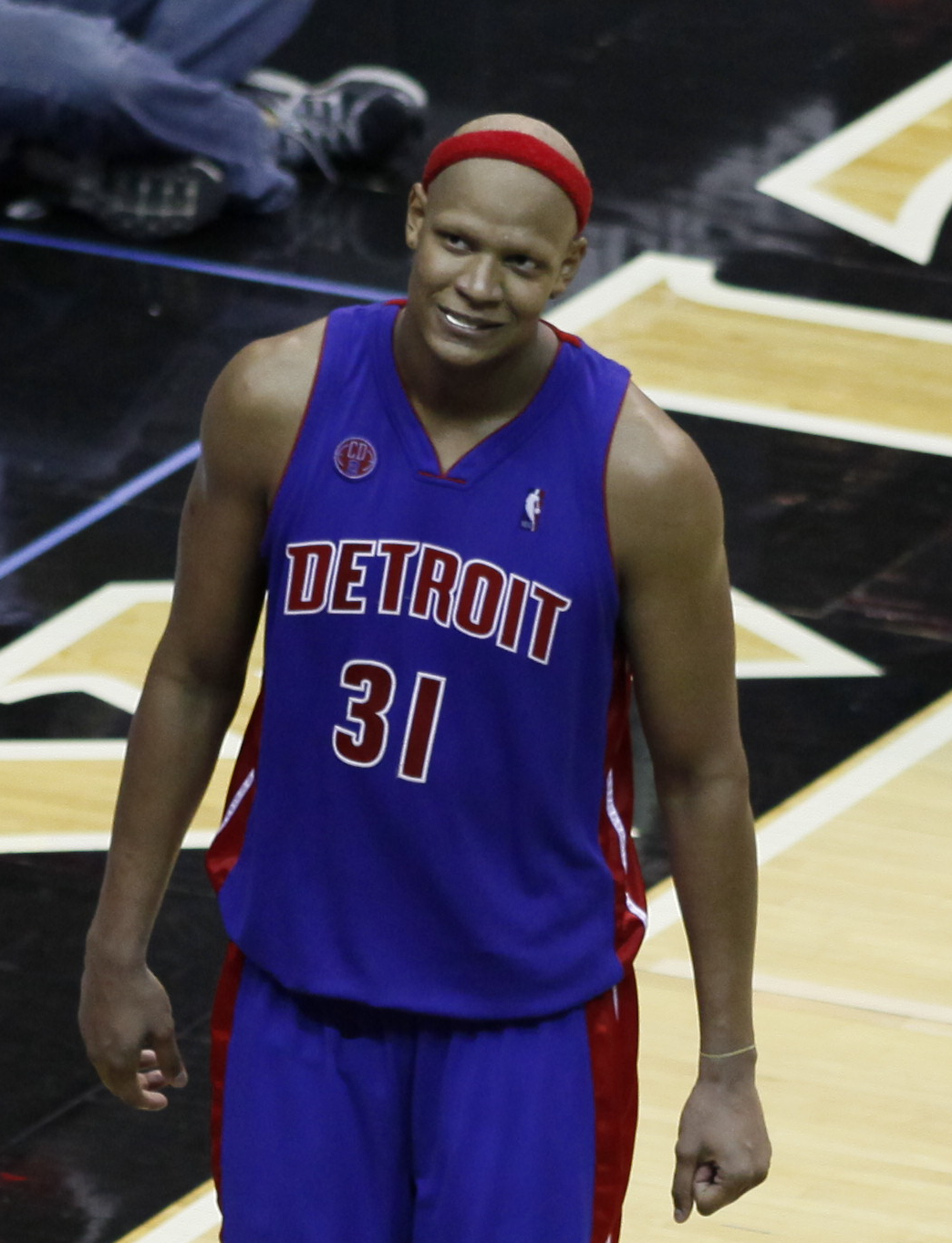
Villanueva with the Pistons in 2009

On July 8, 2009, Villanueva signed a five-year, $40 million contract with the Detroit Pistons. Villanueva had scored a career high 16.7 points per game with Milwaukee the previous season. He was described by Pistons President of Basketball Operations Joe Dumars as "a versatile big man who can play in the post and score from the perimeter as well." He and fellow Pistons signee Ben Gordon were described as "key pieces to our roster next season."

In November 2010, Villanueva tweeted that Boston Celtics forward Kevin Garnett, a known trash-talker, called him a "cancer patient" during a Celtics blowout win over Detroit. In response, Garnett insisted that "My comment to Charlie Villanueva was in fact 'You are cancerous to your team and our league,'" and that he meant no insult to those afflicted with cancer. Celtics coach Doc Rivers backed up Garnett's correction.

On January 2, 2013, Villanueva was fined $25,000 by the NBA for delivering a flagrant foul to Sacramento Kings guard Isaiah Thomas the previous night. Villanueva had been ejected from the game for elbowing Thomas as Thomas drove to the basket. The NBA league office added the fine after reviewing the play.

=== Dallas Mavericks (2014–2016) ===
On September 23, 2014, Villanueva signed with the Dallas Mavericks. On February 9, 2015, he scored a season-high 26 points in a loss to the Los Angeles Clippers.

On August 6, 2015, Villanueva re-signed with the Mavericks to a one-year deal.

== Career statistics ==
Legend
| GP | Games played | GS | Games started | MPG | Minutes per game |
| FG% | Field goal percentage | 3P% | 3-point field goal percentage | FT% | Free throw percentage |
| RPG | Rebounds per game | APG | Assists per game | SPG | Steals per game |
| BPG | Blocks per game | PPG | Points per game | **Bold** | Career high |

=== NBA ===
==== Regular season ====
| Year | Team | GP | GS | MPG | FG% | 3P% | FT% | RPG | APG | SPG | BPG | PPG |
|---|---|---|---|---|---|---|---|---|---|---|---|---|
| 2005–06 | Toronto | **81** | 36 | **29.1** | .463 | .327 | .706 | 6.4 | 1.1 | **.7** | **.8** | 13.0 |
| 2006–07 | Milwaukee | 39 | 17 | 25.2 | **.470** | .337 | .820 | 5.8 | .9 | .6 | .3 | 11.8 |
| 2007–08 | Milwaukee | 76 | 31 | 24.1 | .435 | .297 | .783 | 6.1 | 1.0 | .4 | .5 | 11.7 |
| 2008–09 | Milwaukee | 78 | **47** | 26.9 | .447 | .345 | .838 | **6.7** | **1.8** | .6 | .7 | **16.2** |
| 2009–10 | Detroit | 78 | 16 | 23.7 | .439 | .351 | .815 | 4.7 | .7 | .6 | .7 | 11.9 |
| 2010–11 | Detroit | 76 | 11 | 21.9 | .442 | **.387** | .767 | 3.9 | .6 | .6 | .6 | 11.1 |
| 2011–12 | Detroit | 13 | 0 | 13.8 | .385 | .333 | .857 | 3.7 | .5 | .5 | .4 | 7.0 |
| 2012–13 | Detroit | 69 | 0 | 15.8 | .377 | .347 | .551 | 3.5 | .8 | .4 | .6 | 6.8 |
| 2013–14 | Detroit | 20 | 0 | 9.0 | .380 | .250 | .571 | 1.7 | .3 | .2 | .3 | 4.6 |
| 2014–15 | Dallas | 64 | 1 | 10.6 | .414 | .376 | .571 | 2.3 | .3 | .2 | .3 | 6.3 |
| 2015–16 | Dallas | 62 | 4 | 10.7 | .382 | .273 | **.917** | 2.5 | .4 | .3 | .2 | 5.1 |
| Career | | 656 | 163 | 20.7 | .435 | .341 | .772 | 4.6 | .8 | .5 | .5 | 10.4 |

==== Playoffs ====
| Year | Team | GP | GS | MPG | FG% | 3P% | FT% | RPG | APG | SPG | BPG | PPG |
|---|---|---|---|---|---|---|---|---|---|---|---|---|
| 2015 | Dallas | **5** | 0 | **8.7** | **.440** | **.421** | .000 | **2.6** | **.6** | .2 | .2 | **6.0** |
| 2016 | Dallas | 4 | 0 | 5.3 | .250 | .333 | **1.000** | 0.5 | .2 | .2 | .2 | 2.3 |
| Career | | 9 | 0 | 7.0 | .345 | .377 | 1.000 | 1.6 | .4 | .2 | .2 | 4.3 |

=== College ===
| Year | Team | GP | GS | MPG | FG% | 3P% | FT% | RPG | APG | SPG | BPG | PPG |
|---|---|---|---|---|---|---|---|---|---|---|---|---|
| 2003–04 | Connecticut | **32** | 4 | 19.0 | .514 | .367 | .667 | 5.3 | .7 | .2 | 1.5 | 8.9 |
| 2004–05 | Connecticut | 31 | **31** | **25.7** | **.521** | **.500** | **.688** | **8.3** | **1.3** | **.6** | **1.8** | **13.6** |
| Career | | 63 | 35 | 22.3 | .518 | .393 | .681 | 6.7 | 1.0 | .4 | 1.7 | 11.2 |

== National team career ==
The son of immigrants from the Dominican Republic, Villanueva was raised in Elmhurst, Queens, New York City. Villanueva represented the United States at youth levels but in 2009, he switched sports citizenship to the Dominican Republic. He played for the Dominican Republic national basketball team in the 2009 FIBA Americas Championship.
