= Mike James (basketball, born 1975) =

American basketball player

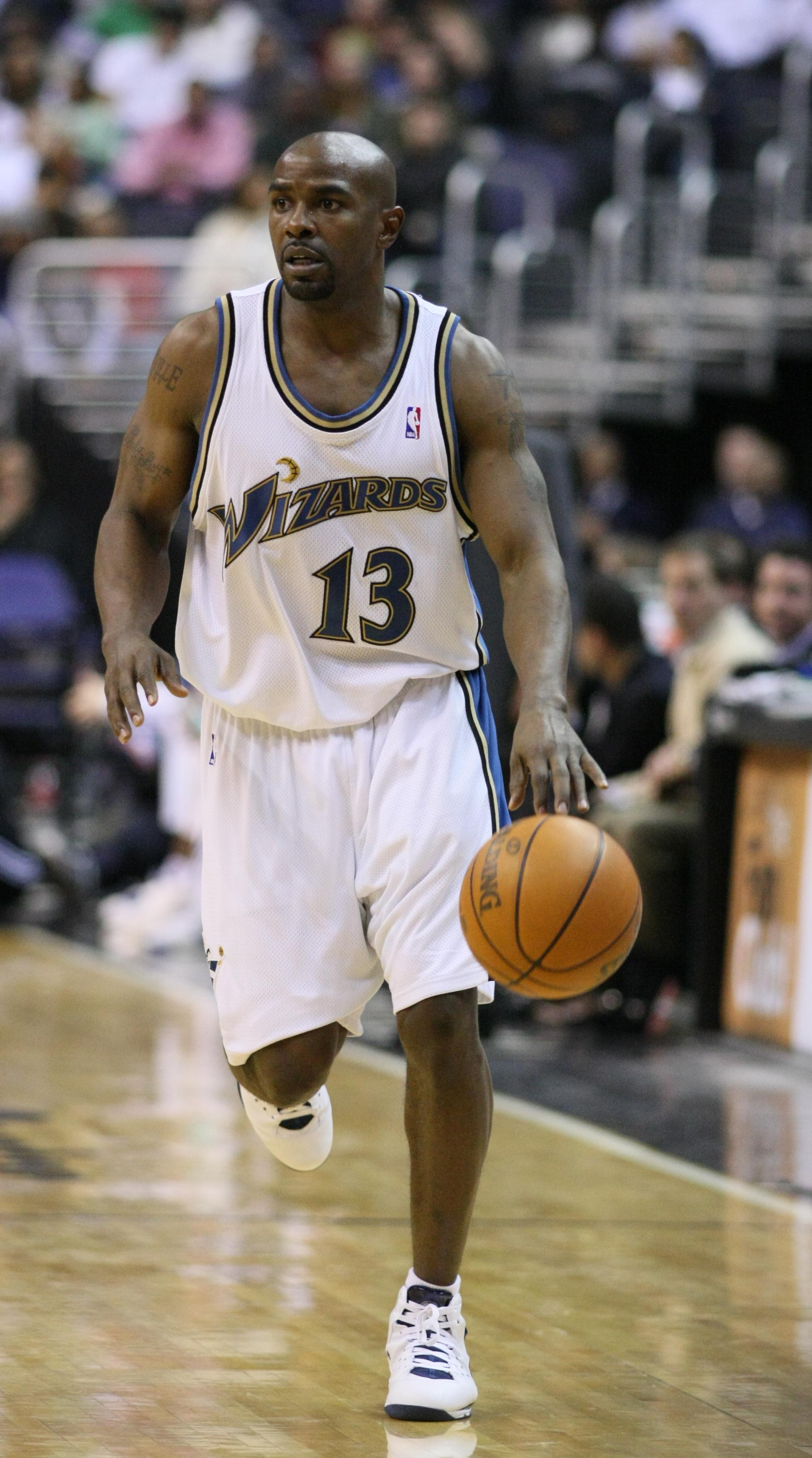
- James with the Washington Wizards in 2009

Personal information
- Born: June 23, 1975 (age 51) Amityville, New York, U.S.
- Listed height: 6 ft 2 in (1.88 m)
- Listed weight: 188 lb (85 kg)

Career information
- High school: Amityville (Amityville, New York)
- College: Duquesne (1994–1998)
- NBA draft: 1998: undrafted
- Playing career: 1998–2015
- Position: Point guard
- Number: 12, 7, 13, 5, 8

Career history
- 1998: Long Island Surf
- 1998–1999: UBC St. Pölten
- 1999–2000: ESPE Châlons-en-Champagne
- 2000–2001: SLUC Nancy Basket
- 2001: Rockford Lightning
- 2001–2003: Miami Heat
- 2003–2004: Boston Celtics
- 2004: Detroit Pistons
- 2004–2005: Milwaukee Bucks
- 2005: Houston Rockets
- 2005–2006: Toronto Raptors
- 2006–2007: Minnesota Timberwolves
- 2007–2008: Houston Rockets
- 2008: New Orleans Hornets
- 2008–2010: Washington Wizards
- 2010: Zhejiang Golden Bulls
- 2011: Aliağa Petkim
- 2011–2012: Erie BayHawks
- 2012: Chicago Bulls
- 2013: Texas Legends
- 2013: Dallas Mavericks
- 2013–2014: Chicago Bulls
- 2014–2015: Texas Legends

Career highlights
- NBA champion (2004); Austrian League Champion (1999); Austrian League All-Star (1999); No. 13 retired by Duquesne Dukes

Career statistics
- Points: 5,863 (9.9 ppg)
- Rebounds: 1,324 (2.2 rpg)
- Assists: 2,075 (3.5 apg)
- Stats at NBA.com
- Stats at Basketball Reference

Michael Lamont James (born June 23, 1975) is an American former professional basketball player. A point guard, James played college basketball for Duquesne. James spent 13 seasons in the NBA and played for 11 different teams, winning an NBA championship with the Detroit Pistons in 2004.

== College career ==
James played college basketball at Duquesne University. He finished his college career as Duquesne's all-time leader in steals (201) and was fifth in assists (348) and 10th in points (1,411). James was named to the all-Atlantic 10 Conference first team in his senior year at the university.

James's number 13 was retired by Duquesne in a February 2017 ceremony.

== Professional career ==
=== Career in Europe ===
James was not drafted by an NBA team in 1998. He began his professional basketball career in Europe. James enjoyed several seasons as an integral player with both French and Austrian teams.

In February 2011, following several NBA seasons, James signed with Aliağa Petkim in Turkey.

=== NBA career ===
James began his NBA career when he signed as a free agent with the Miami Heat during the 2001–02 season. He went on to play for the Boston Celtics, the Detroit Pistons, the Milwaukee Bucks, the Houston Rockets, the Toronto Raptors Where he was an All-Star in 2006 averaging 20.3 ppg, the Minnesota Timberwolves, the New Orleans Hornets, the Washington Wizards, the Chicago Bulls, and the Dallas Mavericks, averaging 10.0 points per game for his career.

==== Detroit Pistons ====
James was a member of the Pistons' 2004 NBA championship team as a reserve. He and fellow reserve guard Lindsey Hunter formed a formidable defensive guard combination nicknamed the "Pit Bulls" by Rasheed Wallace because of their aggressive nature on defense.

==== Toronto Raptors ====
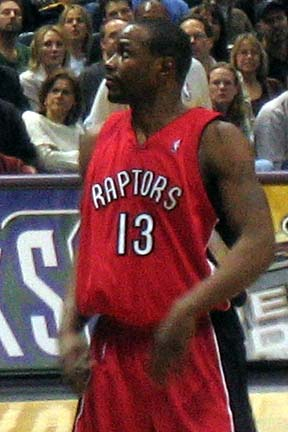
James with the Raptors in 2006

As a starter for the Raptors during the 2005–06 season, James averaged career highs of 20.3 points, 5.8 assists and 3.3 rebounds per game and shot 47% from the field including 44.2% from 3-point range.

Despite being an above-average shooter from the point guard spot, James's playmaking abilities and commitment to defense were called into question, in stark contrast to his "pit bull" days with the Pistons. The Minneapolis Star-Tribune wrote of his big 2005–06 season: "Previously, James had started only 68 games, so some scouts wondered if those numbers were an aberration. Others felt his impending free agency affected his play, prompting him to seek stats at the expense of play-making duties".

While playing for Toronto in the 2005–06 season, he reached a career high of 39 points in a win against the Detroit Pistons. On April 11, 2006, James became the first Raptor to score 30 or more points in four consecutive games.

==== Minnesota Timberwolves ====
James averaged a career-high 20.3 points and 5.8 assists for the Raptors, making him a coveted free agent. On July 11, 2006, James signed a four-year $23.5 million contract with the Minnesota Timberwolves. However, much of the 2006–07 season was marred by mediocre play, which limited his minutes to 25 per game (down from the 37 per game that he averaged during his career year in Toronto).

==== Houston Rockets ====
On June 14, 2007, it was announced that James and teammate Justin Reed would be traded to the Houston Rockets for Juwan Howard.

==== Later career ====
On February 21, 2008, it was announced that James and teammate Bonzi Wells would be traded to the New Orleans Hornets for Bobby Jackson, and Adam Haluska. This ended his second short tenure as a Houston Rocket.

James was traded on December 10, 2008, in a three-team trade between the New Orleans Hornets, Memphis Grizzlies, and Washington Wizards. The trade sent James and Javaris Crittenton to the Wizards and Antonio Daniels to the Hornets. The Grizzlies received a conditional first-round draft pick from the Wizards.

On March 1, 2010, it was announced that the Washington Wizards had reached a buy-out agreement with James and waived him. James averaged 9.3 points per game during his stint with the Wizards, in which he played 57 games.

After joining the Erie Bayhawks in the NBA Development League, James was called up by the Chicago Bulls on January 11, 2012, but released on January 28. On February 14, James was re-signed by the Bulls on a 10-day contract to provide support while Derrick Rose was injured. He was re-signed on a second 10-day contract on March 14. On April 4, 2012, James signed with the Bulls for the rest of the season.

After playing with the Texas Legends of the D-League, James was signed to a 10-day contract by the Dallas Mavericks on January 8, 2013. The Mavs signed him to a second 10-day contract on January 18, 2013. He was then signed for the remainder of the season on January 28, after his second 10-day contract was up.

In September 2013, James signed with the Chicago Bulls. On December 16, 2013, James was waived by the Bulls, after appearing in just seven games. On January 22, 2014, he signed a 10-day contract with the Bulls, returning yet again for another stint. On February 1, 2014, the Bulls decided not to sign James to a second 10-day contract after his first 10-day contract expired. On April 10, 2014, he signed with the Bulls for the rest of the 2013–14 season. On July 15, 2014, he was waived by the Bulls.

=== Post-NBA career ===
On November 3, 2014, James was reacquired by the Texas Legends. On January 25, 2015, he recorded the Legends first triple-double of the season with 21 points, 14 assists and 10 rebounds in the 115–111 win over the Delaware 87ers.

== NBA career statistics ==
Legend
GP	Games played	GS	Games started	MPG	Minutes per game
FG%	Field goal percentage	3P%	3-point field goal percentage	FT%	Free throw percentage
RPG	Rebounds per game	APG	Assists per game	SPG	Steals per game
BPG	Blocks per game	PPG	Points per game	**Bold**	Career high
†	Won an NBA championship	*	Led the league

=== Regular season ===
Year	Team	GP	GS	MPG	FG%	3P%	FT%	RPG	APG	SPG	BPG	PPG
2001–02	Miami	15	0	7.9	.349	.381	.571	.9	1.3	.4	.1	2.8
2002–03	Miami	78	8	22.1	.373	.294	.732	1.9	3.2	.8	.1	7.8
2003–04†	Boston	55	55	30.6	.418	.381	.800	3.2	4.4	**1.3**	.0	10.7
2003–04†	Detroit	26	0	19.7	.401	.364	.844	2.2	3.7	1.0	.0	6.3
2004–05	Milwaukee	47	0	24.8	.446	.382	.744	2.6	3.9	.9	.1	11.4
2004–05	Houston	27	5	25.6	.433	.393	.764	3.2	2.9	.9	.1	12.4
2005–06	Toronto	79	**79**	**37.0**	**.469**	.442	.837	**3.3**	**5.8**	.9	.0	**20.3**
2006–07	Minnesota	**82***	65	25.2	.422	.372	.837	2.0	3.6	.7	.1	10.1
2007–08	Houston	33	1	16.3	.350	.324	.786	1.6	1.6	.5	.1	6.5
2007–08	New Orleans	21	0	8.7	.344	.304	**1.000**	.8	.3	.2	.0	2.7
2008–09	New Orleans	8	0	9.3	.320	**.750**	.500	.9	1.0	.3	.0	2.5
2008–09	Washington	53	50	29.7	.387	.367	.838	2.4	3.6	.8	.1	9.6
2009–10	Washington	4	0	11.5	.300	.333	.500	.8	1.3	.8	.0	4.5
2011–12	Chicago	11	0	10.9	.408	.600	.875	.9	2.6	.4	.2	4.8
2012–13	Dallas	45	23	19.2	.373	.384	.793	1.6	3.1	.6	.1	6.1
2013–14	Chicago	11	0	7.0	.238	.200	.000	.6	1.5	.2	.0	1.0
Career		595	286	24.1	.417	.379	.802	2.2	3.5	.8	.1	9.9

=== Playoffs ===
Year	Team	GP	GS	MPG	FG%	3P%	FT%	RPG	APG	SPG	BPG	PPG
2004†	Detroit	**22**	0	8.9	.396	**.429**	.563	1.2	1.1	.2	.0	2.6
2005	Houston	7	0	**24.4**	**.468**	.000	.958	**1.9**	**2.3**	**.9**	**.3**	**11.6**
2008	New Orleans	4	0	7.0	.333	.400	**1.000**	.3	.3	.5	.0	3.0
Career		33	0	11.9	.425	.286	.810	1.2	1.2	.4	.1	4.5

== See also ==
- List of National Basketball Association undrafted players

== Personal life ==
James and his wife, Angela, have four daughters: Jadon Miciah (b. 2000), Amaya Noel (b. 2003), Michal Mikayla (b. 2007), and McKinley Joel (b. 2008). The family appeared in a 2008 episode of ABC's Supernanny.
