= Morris Peterson =

American professional basketball player (born 1977)

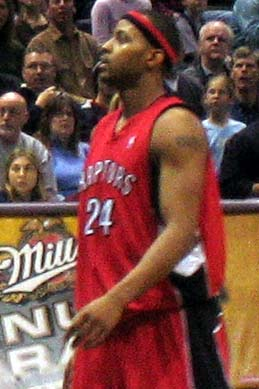
- Peterson with the Raptors in 2006

Personal information
- Born: August 26, 1977 (age 49) Flint, Michigan, U.S.
- Listed height: 6 ft 7 in (2.01 m)
- Listed weight: 220 lb (100 kg)

Career information
- High school: Flint Northwestern (Flint, Michigan)
- College: Michigan State (1995–2000)
- NBA draft: 2000: 1st round, 21st overall pick
- Drafted by: Toronto Raptors
- Playing career: 2000–2011
- Position: Shooting guard / small forward
- Number: 24, 9, 42

Career history
- 2000–2007: Toronto Raptors
- 2007–2010: New Orleans Hornets
- 2010–2011: Oklahoma City Thunder

Career highlights
- NBA All-Rookie First Team (2001); NCAA champion (2000); Consensus second-team All-American (2000); Big Ten Player of the Year (2000); Big Ten tournament MOP (2000); No. 42 retired by Michigan State Spartans
- Stats at NBA.com
- Stats at Basketball Reference

Morris Russell Peterson Jr. (born August 26, 1977) is an American former professional basketball player who played 11 seasons in the National Basketball Association (NBA). He played college basketball for the Michigan State Spartans, earning Big Ten Player of the Year honors and leading the team to a national title in 2000.

== College career ==
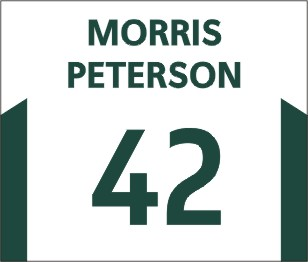
Peterson's #42 was retired by Michigan State University in 2009

Born in Flint, Michigan, Peterson played for the Michigan State and helped lead them to the 2000 NCAA title.

In his senior year at MSU, Peterson led the team in scoring, field goal percentage, and free throw percentage. He had a team-high 30 double-digit scoring efforts. He was voted Big Ten Player of the Year and First Team All-Big Ten, and he placed as first or second team All-American on five different polls.

He was selected 21st overall by the Raptors in the 2000 NBA draft, and was a starter in the majority of their games during his first three seasons. On January 17, 2009, MSU retired his number 42 with MSU's other all-time greats before their game against the Illinois Fighting Illini.

== NBA career ==
=== Toronto Raptors ===
Drafted in the first round by the Raptors in 2000, Peterson was a fan favorite from the moment he stepped on the floor. While enjoying some early success in his professional career, Peterson's production faced a steady decline, before stepping up in the wake of the new era of Raptor youngsters being ushered in, taking on a more expansive leadership role and transforming himself into an elite perimeter defender, a clutch performer and consistent scorer. He is known for his three-point shooting, acrobatic shots, defense, and fearless driving to the basket.

On December 28, 2005, Peterson set a record for career games played as a Raptor, surpassing Alvin Williams with 418 games played. Peterson also leads the NBA in longest consecutive games played, appearing in 371 straight until November 22, 2006, when he missed his first game in over four years.

Peterson posted career highs in points and rebounds averaging 16.8 points and 4.6 rebounds and threw in 2.3 assists per game through 82 games played in the 2005–06 season.

Perhaps the biggest highlight of his career occurred against the Washington Wizards on March 30, 2007, in a game that helped determine the two teams' playoff seeding. The Raptors trailed 109–106 with only 3.8 seconds left and no timeouts remaining. The Wizards' Michael Ruffin intercepted the full-court pass and tried to toss the ball high into the air so that the clock would run out. But the ball slipped from his hands and was not thrown high enough. There was still enough time on the clock as Peterson caught the ball and launched a "Hail Mary" three-pointer and sank it to send the game into overtime. Peterson only played 55 seconds in the game, with his first shift beginning with only 9.3 seconds left in the fourth quarter. The Raptors went on to defeat the Wizards, 123–118.

After signing Bryan Colangelo, it became apparent that the re-building process of the Raptors would not include Peterson. It was only a matter of time before his contract expired in the summer of 2007 that he would be gone.

=== New Orleans Hornets ===
On July 13, 2007, the New Orleans Hornets signed Peterson to a four-year contract, worth $23 million.

=== Oklahoma City Thunder ===
On July 8, 2010, the Hornets traded Peterson along with #11 overall pick in the 2010 draft, Cole Aldrich, to the Oklahoma City Thunder for two 2010 first-round draft picks (#21, Craig Brackins and #26, Quincy Pondexter).

=== Charlotte Bobcats ===
On February 24, 2011, Peterson was traded to the Charlotte Bobcats along with D.J. White in exchange for Nazr Mohammed. He was waived four days later when his contract was bought out by the Bobcats. Peterson's final NBA game was played on December 12, 2010, in a 106 - 77 win over the Cleveland Cavaliers where he recorded 2 points.

== Broadcasting career ==
On January 14, 2015, TSN announced that Peterson would join their broadcast team as an analyst. For the network's package of Toronto Raptors games, Peterson joined TSN's broadcast team of Jack Armstrong, Leo Rautins, Matt Devlin, and Rod Black both in the TSN Studio and on-site at the Air Canada Centre in Toronto, Ontario. Peterson will also deliver analysis for SportsCentre and appear throughout the network's expanded NCAA coverage, including TSN's wall-to-wall coverage of NCAA March Madness. As of 2017, Peterson is no longer an analyst on TSN.

== Restaurant ==
On January 23, 2018, Peterson, in a partnership with Viktor Palushaj, opened "MoPetes Sports Retreat" just outside his hometown of Flint in neighboring Flint Township, Michigan. The menu features Michigan inspired dishes such as The Flintstones Combos, Flint-Town Reuben sandwich, the Izzo sub, and The National Champ Philly cheesesteak sandwich.

== Accolades ==
- Career-high: March 31, 2006 Peterson scored a career-best 38 points vs. the Phoenix Suns.
- First-round draft choice (21st overall) by Toronto in 2000.
- Recorded his 800th career three-point field goal April 3, 2005 vs. the Detroit Pistons.
- Had a career-high 14 rebounds April 8, 2005.
- Held the longest active streak of games played, with 371, ending in 2006.
- Held Raptors career records for games played (542) and 3-point field goals (801).

== NBA career statistics ==
Legend
GP	Games played	GS	Games started	MPG	Minutes per game
FG%	Field goal percentage	3P%	3-point field goal percentage	FT%	Free throw percentage
RPG	Rebounds per game	APG	Assists per game	SPG	Steals per game
BPG	Blocks per game	PPG	Points per game	**Bold**	Career high
*	Led the league

=== Regular season ===
Year	Team	GP	GS	MPG	FG%	3P%	FT%	RPG	APG	SPG	BPG	PPG
2000–01	Toronto	80	49	22.6	.431	.382	.717	3.2	1.3	.8	.2	9.3
2001–02	Toronto	63	56	31.6	**.438**	.364	.751	3.5	**2.4**	1.2	.2	14.0
2002–03	Toronto	**82**	**80**	36.0	.392	.337	.789	4.4	2.3	1.1	**.4**	14.1
2003–04	Toronto	**82**	29	26.2	.405	.371	.809	3.2	1.4	1.1	.2	8.3
2004–05	Toronto	**82**	61	30.6	.420	.385	**.832**	4.1	2.1	1.1	.2	12.5
2005–06	Toronto	**82***	77	**38.3**	.436	**.395**	.820	**4.6**	2.3	**1.3**	.2	**16.8**
2006–07	Toronto	71	12	21.3	.429	.359	.683	3.3	.7	.6	.2	8.9
2007–08	New Orleans	76	76	23.6	.417	.394	.765	2.7	.9	.6	.1	8.0
2008–09	New Orleans	43	9	12.0	.399	.388	.632	2.0	.4	.3	.1	4.4
2009–10	New Orleans	46	39	21.2	.385	.363	.611	2.7	.9	.5	.1	7.1
2010–11	Oklahoma City	4	0	5.8	.400	.000	.000	.8	.3	.0	.0	1.0
Career		711	488	27.2	.418	.373	.773	3.5	1.5	.9	.2	10.7

=== Playoffs ===
Year	Team	GP	GS	MPG	FG%	3P%	FT%	RPG	APG	SPG	BPG	PPG
2001	Toronto	8	3	13.8	.514	.444	.750	1.5	1.9	.8	.0	5.4
2002	Toronto	5	5	**30.8**	.367	.118	.800	2.8	**2.2**	**1.0**	**.6**	**9.2**
2007	Toronto	6	2	30.5	**.517**	**.500**	**.833**	**4.5**	.3	.3	.3	6.8
2008	New Orleans	**12**	**12**	23.1	.485	.471	.667	2.6	.6	.5	.2	7.2
2009	New Orleans	2	0	10.5	.200	.333	.750	1.5	.5	.5	.0	3.0
Career		33	22	22.6	.457	.387	.767	2.6	1.1	.6	.2	6.7
