= Under Armour Undeniable Performance ESPY Award =

Athletic award in 2006

The Under Armour Undeniable Performance ESPY Award was only awarded once, in 2006, on the player, irrespective of gender or nationality, adjudged to have made, in a given calendar year, the most significant, remarkable, and undeniable performance in a single regular season or playoff game contested professionally under the auspices of one of the four major North American leagues or collegiately under the auspices of the National Collegiate Athletic Association. The award was one of two corporate-sponsored ESPYs; the titular sponsor designates criteria for selection consistent with its advertising campaigns.

Balloting for the award was conducted over the Internet by fans from amongst between three and five choices selected by the ESPN Select Nominating Committee. At the time, the ESPY Awards ceremony was conducted in June (it is now held in July) and awards conferred reflect performance and achievement over the twelve months preceding presentation.

== List of winners ==
Year of award	Date	Game or event	Venue	Competition, governing body, or league	Competing teams	Sport	Player and performance
2006	22 January 2006	2005-06 regular season game	Staples Center Los Angeles, California, United States	National Basketball Association	Los Angeles Lakers Toronto Raptors	Basketball	In his side's 122-104 victory, Lakers shooting guard Kobe Bryant converts 21 of 33 two-point field goals, 7 of 13 three-point field goals, and 18 of 20 free throws attempted to score 81 points, more in a single game than any player save Wilt Chamberlain (100 in the 1961-62 season)

== See also ==
- Best Moment ESPY Award
- Best Play ESPY Award
- Best Record-Breaking Performance ESPY Award
