= Bam Adebayo's 83-point game =

2026 NBA game

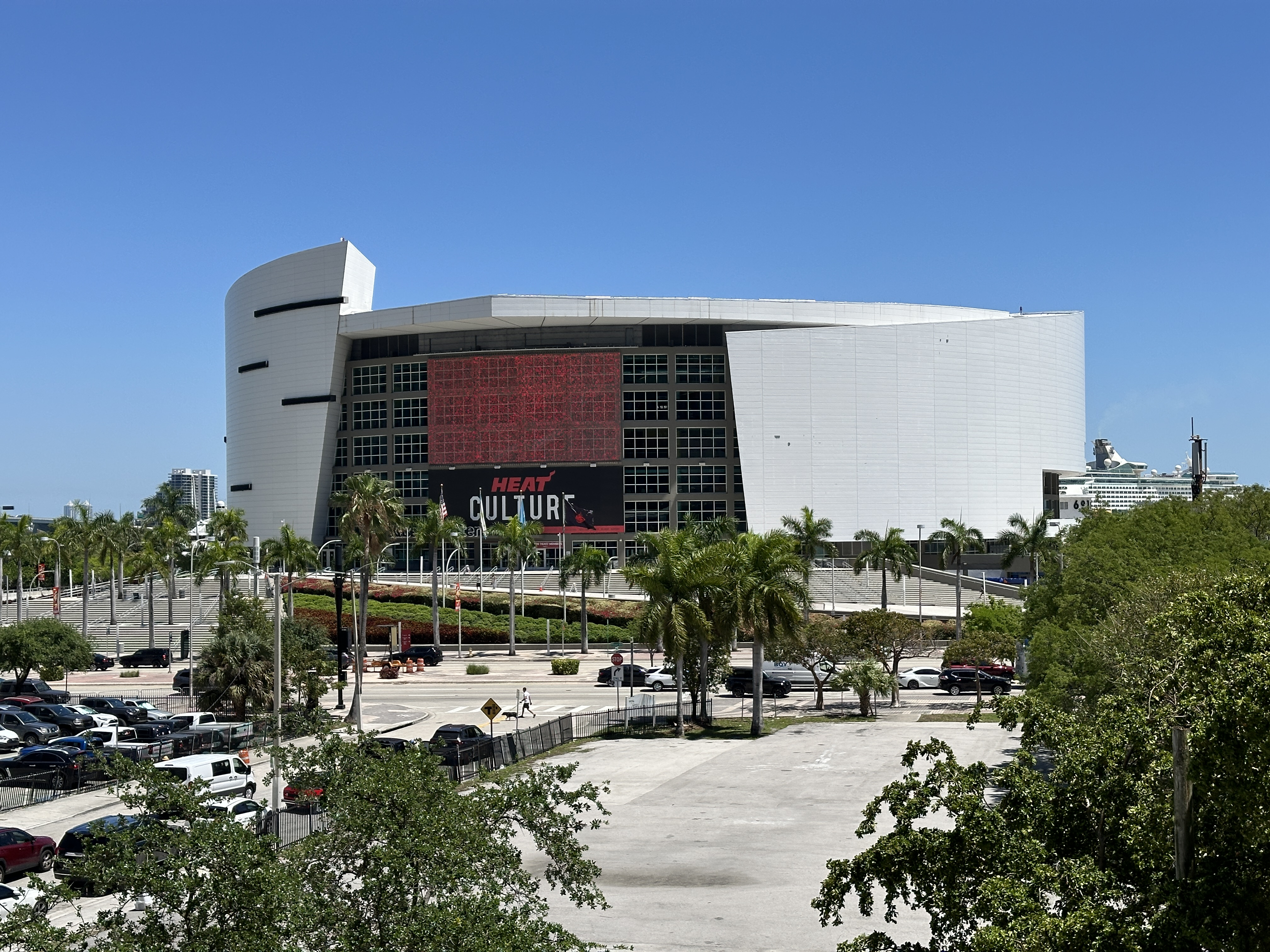
- The Kaseya Center in Miami, where the game took place.
Washington Wizards	Miami Heat
129	150
Head coach: Brian Keefe	Head coach: Erik Spoelstra
	1	2	3	4	Total
Washington Wizards	29	33	35	32	129
Miami Heat	40	36	37	37	150
- Date: March 10, 2026
- Venue: Kaseya Center, Miami, Florida
- Referees: Ben Taylor; Pat Fraher; Dedric Taylor
- Attendance: 19,700
- Network: FanDuel Sports Network Sun (Heat); Monumental Sports Network (Wizards)

On March 10, 2026, at Kaseya Center in Miami, Florida, Bam Adebayo scored 83 points for the Miami Heat in a 150–129 win over the Washington Wizards. The performance is the second-highest single-game scoring total in NBA history, behind only Wilt Chamberlain's 100-point game in 1962, and moved Adebayo past Kobe Bryant's 81-point game from 2006 to set a mark for the most points scored since the NBA–ABA merger. Adebayo also set a record for the most free throws made and attempted in NBA history, with 36 made out of a possible 43.

== Background ==
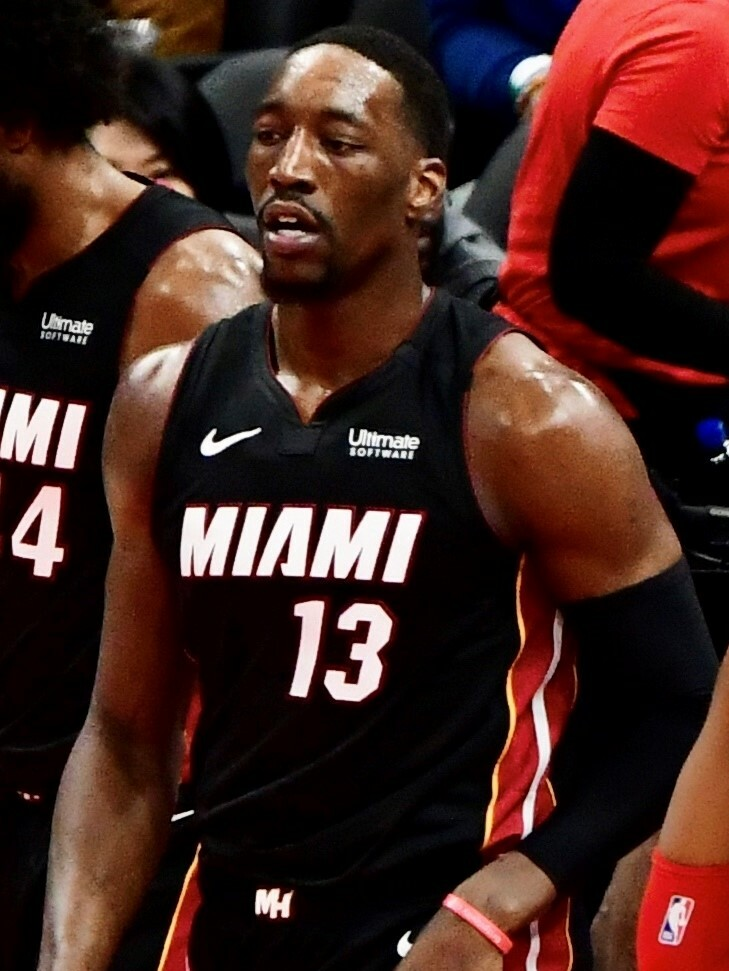
Adebayo in 2020

Heading into the game, Bam Adebayo was in his ninth season in the NBA, and had garnered praise mostly for his role as the Heat's secondary offensive weapon and one of the best defenders in the NBA. He had earned three All-Star appearances, one All-Defensive First Team, and four All-Defensive Second Teams. Prior to this game, Adebayo was averaging 18.9 points per game and only held a career average of 15.8 points per game, with his previous career high in points being 41.

The Heat came into the game with a record of 36–29, which put them at 7th in the Eastern Conference standings. They entered the game with a five-game winning streak, and sought to reach the six-seed, which would keep them out of the NBA play-in tournament. The Wizards entered the game with a 16–47 record, which placed them at 14th in the Eastern Conference.

== Game report ==
=== First half ===
The Heat won the tip to start the game and Adebayo immediately got off to a hot start, scoring the Heat's first seven points over the course of the first three minutes of the game. After two free throws from Pelle Larsson, Adebayo then scored 18 of the Heat's next 20 points, with the only other scorer during that period being Davion Mitchell. By the end of the first quarter, Adebayo had scored 31 of the Heat's 40 points and had outscored the Wizards 31–29.

Adebayo was on the bench for the first seven minutes of the second quarter, but continued his high volume scoring once he re-entered the game. He made his 7th free throw of the game with under six minutes left in the 2nd quarter, which was followed by a combined three layups and five free throws. With 41 seconds left in the first half, Adebayo had 40 points and made a layup while being fouled by Wizards small forward Will Riley to pass his prior career high of 41 points. He would make the ensuing free throw to reach 43 points before halftime.

=== Second half ===
After halftime, Adebayo scored 19 points in the 3rd quarter, bringing his total to 62. He started his scoring with a dunk in the first 90 seconds of the second half, followed by a three pointer seven minutes remaining in the third quarter. With less than four minutes left in the third, Adebayo was fouled by Tristan Vukčević and scored on both free throws, bringing his total to 57 points, surpassing the season high of 56 that was set by Nikola Jokić on Christmas. In the final minute of the third quarter, Dru Smith got a steal off of guard Sharife Cooper Adebayo made another dunk which put him at 62 points, giving him the all-time Heat record for points in a game, previously held by LeBron James, who had scored 61.

In the fourth quarter, the game devolved into what Wizards coach Brian Keefe called "not a real basketball game." Once Adebayo reached 70 points with nine minutes remaining in the fourth after an and-one foul from Bub Carrington, Heat coach Erik Spoelstra made a concerted effort to get the ball to Adebayo to get him past Kobe Bryant's 81 point game, with Spoelstra stating two days later that they "[had] to go for it." Adebayo scored his 77th point with 3:26 remaining in the game after Spoelstra used a coach's challenge to reverse a charging foul call on Adebayo. With 2:05 left in the game, Adebayo was fouled by Anthony Gill, which was challenged by Keefe. The call on the court stood and Adebayo hit both free throws to reach 79 points.

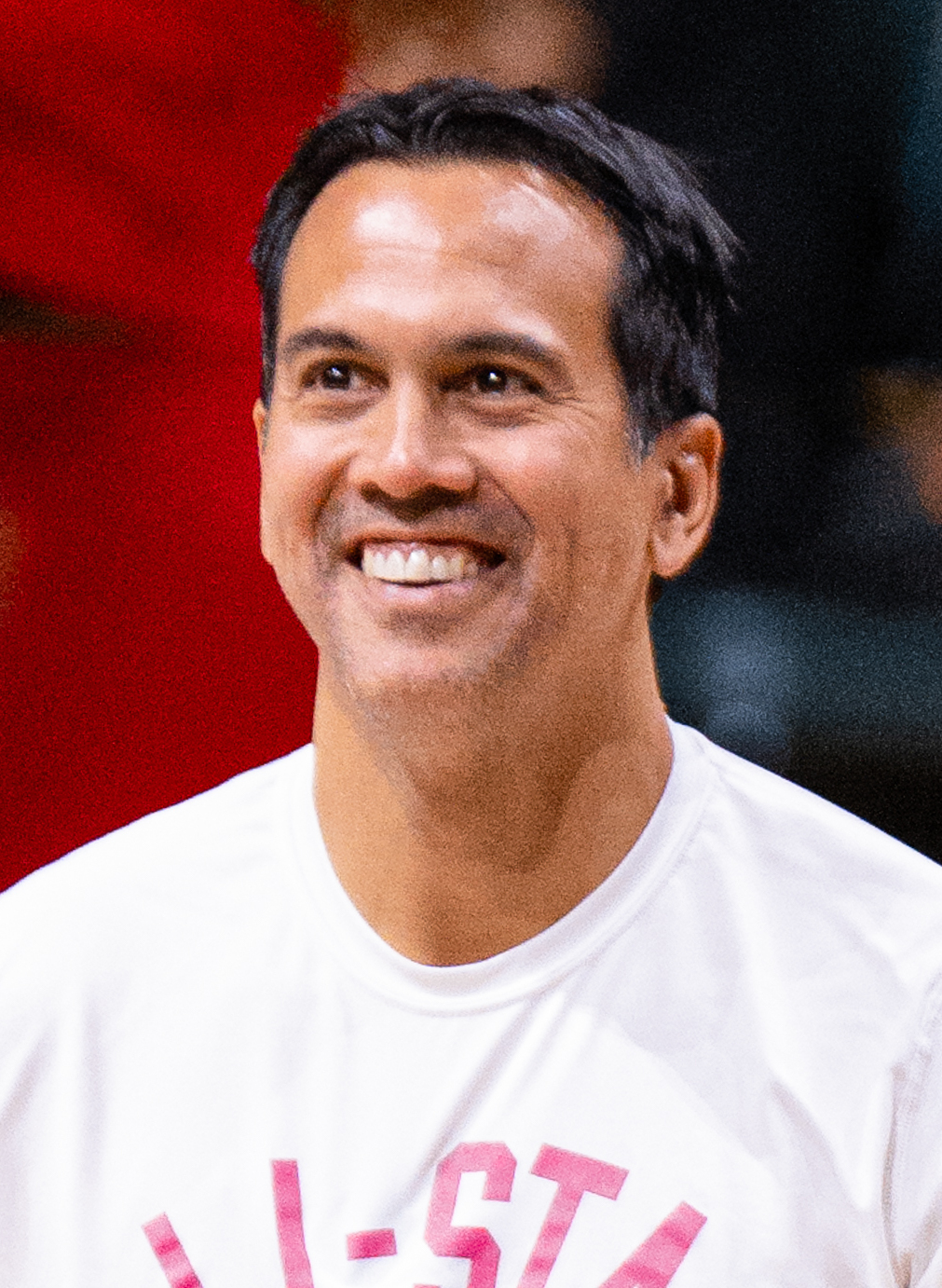
Head coach Erik Spoelstra made a concerted effort to help Adebayo score in the fourth quarter

Despite being up by 27 points, Heat players began intentionally fouling the Wizards to stop the clock and regain possession, with the first intentional foul occurring with 1:40 left in the game. To prevent Adebayo from attempting more free throws, the Wizards began fouling other players. Heat players funneled Adebayo the ball, with the Wizards countering by double-teaming, triple-teaming, and sometimes quadruple-teaming him in order to prevent him from scoring. With 1:37 left in the game, Adebayo was fouled by Jaden Hardy and scored his 80th and 81st points at the line, tying Kobe Bryant's mark for a game. With 1:25 remaining in the game, the Heat's Keshad Johnson was fouled and intentionally missed his second free throw off the front of the rim in an attempt to gain another possession for Adebayo, though the rebound was secured by the Wizards' Bilal Coulibaly. Then, with 1:16 left, Adebayo was fouled by Anthony Gill and made both his free throws to reach 83 points and take sole possession of the second highest single-game scoring effort. After an intentional foul by Kasparas Jakučionis, Adebayo was subbed out of the game to a standing ovation.

After the game, Adebayo was showered with water bottles by his teammates during his post-game interview. Norman Powell then requested the microphone from reporter Kelly Saco, and asked Adebayo how it felt to be in company with Wilt Chamberlain and Kobe Bryant.

== Reaction ==
=== Players ===
Former Heat teammate Dwyane Wade congratulated Adebayo after the game and said, "That's my little brother, man. I'm proud of him." Rockets forward Kevin Durant commented, "I looked at the stat sheet and it was pretty crazy. [He had] 40 shots, 40 free throws, 20 3s—that takes a lot of stamina, man. ... Huge accomplishment. It will be something we talk about forever." Bucks forward Giannis Antetokounmpo, speaking with a reporter, said, "It doesn't matter how you get [to 83 points]; all that matters is that you got it. Like, in 10, 20, 30 years from now, nobody's going to remember how many free throws he shot. I don't think I remember how many shots Kobe shot or how many free throws he made or threes. All you remember is 81. Wilt, 100. You don't remember [how]. So, at the end of the day, he got 83 points, and did they win?"

76ers forward Kelly Oubre Jr. discredited the accomplishment by comparing it to similar high-scoring games, such as Joel Embiid's 70-point game. Former Lakers player and Kobe Bryant teammate Robert Horry stated, "83 points is impressive. But it gets to a point where you have to respect the game. And I think there were moments in this game where it was not respected." Former NBA All-Star Gordon Hayward stated that Adebayo's performance would reflect poorly on the league, "I don't think it's great for the league. I think it kind of highlights how they're already struggling. It kind of feels like a pickup game when you're watching. And for him to shoot 43 free throws and 22 threes, when that's not what he does, it almost feels like... and again, the Wizards too. With all these teams tanking, it kind of makes it feel not legit, I guess, is what I would say."

=== Coaches ===
After the game, Heat head coach Erik Spoelstra stated it was "an absolutely surreal night." Former Celtics coach and current head coach of the Rockets, Ime Udoka commented, "First thing you think is 'how?' — not because of him, but because of the way he plays. And I saw he only made six threes but 40 free throws or something like that? Tells the story right there. And the Washington Wizards." Former Heat head coach and current team president Pat Riley came across Adebayo in the tunnel following the game, telling him, "I would've taken you out at 70. Goddamn it! You did it!"

=== Media ===
Adebayo's performance garnered a mixed to positive reaction from sportswriters and fans, but a negative reaction from those supporting the Lakers and Kobe Bryant. ESPN writer Tim MacMahon heavily criticized Adebayo, stating, "He's jacking up threes while being triple-teamed. I mean, it honestly was just awful, hideous, disgusting basketball down the stretch that I admit I was cracking up laughing while watching." Commentator Doris Burke said, "Was I slightly uncomfortable with the 6 minute mark and down with some of the intentional fouling and free throws? A little bit, but I am taking nothing away from Bam Adebayo." Television personality Stephen A. Smith lambasted the Wizards, claiming, "They actually looked like they were helping Bam Adebayo capture the record", referring to Wizards players fouling Adebayo near the end of the game. Sam Amick of The Athletic suggested that Adebayo should have stopped scoring after reaching 81 points, matching Kobe Bryant's total, saying, "That gesture alone — Adebayo calling it quits right as he hit 81 — would have masked all the messiness of this stat-chasing moment."

=== Bam Adebayo ===
Adebayo, after the game, said to reporters, "I wish I could relive it twice...so this is a special moment. Wilt, me and then Kobe—which sounds crazy." Days later, he reflected further on the game:

First of all, y’all are blaming me. You should be blaming that head coach. Get that first. I was not the one that let me go one-on-one the whole game until I had 70 (points) and then started to send a double (team). At that point, I had 70 with, what, nine minutes left to go in the game? You think I’m not going for it?” That’s the thing that’s crazy when they talk about the unethical part of basketball. I’m like, ‘I had 70 with nine minutes to go. Who would just be like, ‘You know, coach? Just take me out.’ Yeah, right. … A minute? All right. Nine? Yeah, I’m going for it. You can’t be mad at that. If you are mad, I don’t care. Because a lot of people, they’re upset because if they did play, they never had a chance to get that close to chasing greatness. And if you get that close to chasing greatness, that’s the point of chasing it, so you can surpass it. … If you’ve been in the backyard, and you and a couple of your homies are playing 21, and you got 19, you’re not gonna get an easy look off. They’re gonna talk about the free throws. It’s not like I shoot 15 free throws a game. It’s not like I average 10 free throws a game. You can watch the film. I was legitimately getting fouled every time, so I went to the free-throw line. Some people going crazy, because they’re like, ’83 is 83, no matter how you get it. And some people are gonna say, ‘It wasn’t the way Kobe did it.’ And you start throwing that around, and I’m like, ‘Listen, I’m a Kobe fan.’ I got close to his record. What do you think I’m gonna do? Try to break it. I’m pretty sure if I had 81 and Kobe was on his way (to breaking it), he would not be like, ‘You know what? I’m gonna check myself out with nine minutes left when I got 70.’ Be serious. Like Kobe said, you gotta be in shape. You gotta have great endurance and be in shape to really catch that, and I understand it now.

== Adebayo's box score ==
Statistics by quarter:

Quarter	Min	FGM	FGA	FTM	FTA	3PM	3PA	PTS
1st	12	10	16	6	7	5	8	31
2nd	7	3	8	6	7	0	3	12
3rd	12	4	11	10	13	1	5	19
4th	11	3	8	14	16	1	6	21
Total	42	20	43	36	43	7	22	83

== See also ==
- Wilt Chamberlain's 100-point game
- Kobe Bryant's 81-point game
