= Damon Stoudamire =

American basketball player and coach (born 1973)

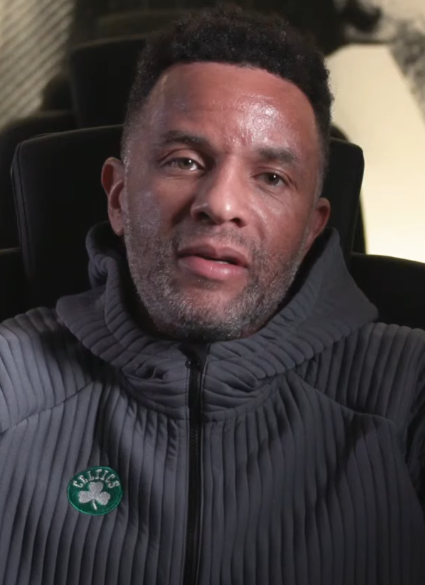
- Stoudamire in 2021 as a Celtics assistant coach

LSU Tigers
- Title: Assistant coach
- League: Southeastern Conference

Personal information
- Born: September 3, 1973 (age 53) Portland, Oregon, U.S.
- Listed height: 5 ft 10 in (1.78 m)
- Listed weight: 171 lb (78 kg)

Career information
- High school: Woodrow Wilson (Portland, Oregon)
- College: Arizona (1991–1995)
- NBA draft: 1995: 1st round, 7th overall pick
- Drafted by: Toronto Raptors
- Playing career: 1995–2008
- Position: Point guard
- Number: 20, 3
- Coaching career: 2009–present

Career history

Playing
- 1995–1998: Toronto Raptors
- 1998–2005: Portland Trail Blazers
- 2005–2008: Memphis Grizzlies
- 2008: San Antonio Spurs

Career highlights
- As player: NBA Rookie of the Year (1996); NBA All-Rookie First Team (1996); Consensus first-team All-American (1995); Pac-10 Player of the Year (1995); 3× First-team All-Pac-10 (1993–1995); As coach: Ben Jobe Award (2020); WCC Coach of the Year (2020)

Career NBA statistics
- Points: 11,763 (13.4 ppg)
- Assists: 5,371 (6.1 apg)
- Steals: 953 (1.1 spg)
- Stats at NBA.com
- Stats at Basketball Reference
Medals
Men's basketball
Representing United States
Goodwill Games
Bronze medal – third place	1994 St. Petersburg	National team
Summer Universiade
Gold medal – first place	1993 Buffalo	National team

Damon Lamon Stoudamire (born September 3, 1973) is an American college basketball coach and former player, who currently is an assistant coach for LSU. He also was the head coach for the Georgia Tech Yellow Jackets of the Atlantic Coast Conference, finishing last in the ACC in his final season (ACC). The 5 ft 10 in (1.78 m), 171 lb (78 kg) point guard was selected with the 7th overall pick by the Toronto Raptors in the 1995 NBA draft and won the 1995–96 NBA Rookie of the Year Award. He played collegiately at the University of Arizona, and professionally for the Toronto Raptors, Portland Trail Blazers, Memphis Grizzlies and San Antonio Spurs. He has been nicknamed “Mighty Mouse.”

== Early life ==
Stoudamire was born to Willie Stoudamire and Liz Washington in Portland, Oregon; he was an only child with three stepsisters; his parents never married. Willie Stoudamire moved away to Milwaukee, Wisconsin, to work in a brewery when Damon was seven years old. Stoudamire was raised by his mother, Liz, and his grandmother, Wanda Stoudamire-Matthews.

While Stoudamire was growing up, his uncles, Charles and Anthony Stoudamire, got him involved in sports, mainly basketball and football. They acted as fathers and personal coaches to Stoudamire in his younger years, as he grew up watching his favorite player, Nate Archibald, and attempted to pattern his game after his childhood hero. As he grew older, Stoudamire began to play basketball at Irving Park in the Portland–Irvington neighborhood and at the Matt Dishman Community Center in Portland.

Stoudamire attended Holy Redeemer grade school (a Catholic school) and Harriet Tubman Middle School, then attended Woodrow Wilson High School. During his junior year in high school, his grandmother Wanda died of cancer. He would later tattoo Wanda's face and her address on his left arm in remembrance. He was expected to attend and play basketball at Oregon, but chose to attend Arizona instead.

== High school career ==
Stoudamire attended Wilson High School (now Ida B. Wells-Barnett High School). Playing basketball for the Trojans, he led his team to a 74–4 record and state championships in 1989 and 1991.

For his career, he averaged 26.1 points, 9.2 assists, and 3.6 rebounds per game. He earned two Oregon Player of the Year awards and one Converse High School All-America Team selection during his senior year.

== College career ==
Stoudamire played point guard for the Arizona Wildcats and coach, Lute Olson. He was a first-team All-American and finalist for College Player of the Year. He teamed with Khalid Reeves his junior year to lead the team to the Final Four. During his senior year he earned the All-American honors for his 22.8 points per game. He also finished his college career first on the Wildcats' all-time list in three-pointers made (272), second in points (1,849), fourth in assists (663), and was the only player in Arizona history to have two 40-point games. Stoudamire scored his career-high 45 points at Stanford University on January 14, 1995. He was named a 1995 Wooden Award finalist after sharing the Pac-10 Player of the Year award with Ed O'Bannon.

Despite being the youngest player on the roster of the United States men's national basketball team, Stoudamire led the team in assists and steals en route to a gold medal at the 1993 Summer Universiade.

== Professional career ==
=== Toronto Raptors (1995–1998) ===
Stoudamire made an impact with the Raptors before he ever set foot on the court for them. At the 1995 NBA draft held in Toronto, the fans in attendance chanted loudly for the Raptors to select UCLA standout Ed O'Bannon with their first ever draft pick, loudly booing when the team announced their first pick would be Stoudamire instead. Years later, Stoudamire would tell Maclean's that the boos did not bother him, serving as being extra motivation for him, as he believed that the fans would change their mind once they saw him play for the first time. Stoudamire would go on to a noteworthy rookie season with the Raptors, averaging 9.3 assists and 19 points per game. He earned the nickname "Mighty Mouse" because he stands only 5 ft 10 in (1.78 m), and because he had a Mighty Mouse tattoo on his right arm going into his rookie season. He set the record for three-point field goals made by a rookie with 133, breaking the record at the time held by Dennis Scott. This record has been broken several times over since Stoudamire's 133 mark. It is currently held by Kon Knueppel, who eclipsed 207 threes made in just 59 games during his rookie season. Stoudamire ranks third in assist average by a rookie. He ranked second in scoring among all rookies in 1995–96, and led all rookies in minutes played and assists. He received the Schick Rookie of the Month award twice and unanimously made the Schick All Rookie First Team, and eventually won the Rookie of the Year award, receiving 76 of the possible 113 votes, and the MVP award of the Rookie All-Star Game. He holds the record for being the third-lowest draft pick (7th overall) to ever win the Rookie of the Year award. He is also known as the shortest player to ever win this award. He did not play the last 10 games of his rookie season due to tendinitis in his left knee. The Raptors finished that year and his rookie season with 21 wins and 61 losses.

Stoudamire previously held the record for most triple doubles with the Toronto Raptors with 3 triple doubles, a record that stood until 2014, when it was broken by Kyle Lowry. In his second season, he averaged 20.2 points a game with 4.1 rebounds and 8.8 assists and played in all 81 games for the team. The following year saw him play in 71 games, albeit for two teams.

=== Portland Trail Blazers (1998–2005) ===
Following the resignation of the Raptors' vice president, Isiah Thomas, Stoudamire readily demanded a trade. On February 13, 1998, he was traded by the Raptors along with Walt Williams and Carlos Rogers to the Portland Trail Blazers in exchange for Kenny Anderson, Alvin Williams, Gary Trent, two first-round draft picks, a second-round draft pick and cash considerations. During the first round of the 1998 NBA Playoffs, on April 26, 1998, Stoudamire scored 17 points and recorded 14 assists during a Game 2 loss to the Los Angeles Lakers. On December 28, 2000, Stoudamire scored 32 points and hit the game-winning shot with 0.4 seconds left during a 103–102 win over the Utah Jazz. In the 2002–03 season, the Blazers benched Stoudamire for most of the season. The new head coach, Maurice Cheeks, went with Scottie Pippen and Bonzi Wells instead at the guard positions. However, Stoudamire received significant playing time in the playoffs that season.

On January 14, 2005, Stoudamire hit a career-high and Blazers then-franchise record 54 points, which included 8 3-pointers, against the New Orleans Hornets. The same season, on April 15, he shot an NBA record 21 3-point attempts, making only 5 of them.

Stoudamire's contract with the Blazers expired at the end of the 2004–05 season, and it became widely known that the Blazers, who were focusing on youth movement and looking for players with good character, had no intention of re-signing him. This became abundantly clear in August 2005, when the team signed free agent guard Juan Dixon to a contract, and assigned him Stoudamire's uniform number (3). Stoudamire wanted the Blazers to work out a sign-and-trade deal whereby he would end up with the Houston Rockets, but since this would have required Portland to take one of Houston's overpaid players in return and the team, at that time, had a relatively high payroll, Portland management decided to go in another direction with players like Travis Outlaw and Sebastian Telfair.

=== Memphis Grizzlies (2005–2008) ===
On August 5, 2005, after Stoudamire had been in discussions with several teams, it was announced he signed a 4-year deal with the Memphis Grizzlies, where he replaced Jason Williams, who left for the Miami Heat, as the starting point guard. On December 30, 2005, he tore his right patellar tendon, coincidentally in his hometown of Portland. He was carted off the court, and had successful surgery in Birmingham, Alabama the following week. He missed the rest of the 2005–06 season, returning for 2006–07, and ended up playing 62 games, of which he started 51 (evenly splitting point guard duties with veteran backup Chucky Atkins).

During the 2007–08 season, on NBA Access with Ahmad Rashad, he said that he was working hard with Mike Conley Jr., a 2007 draft pick by the Grizzlies, who, after Stoudamire had left, would play a major role as a point guard. When Conley returned from an injury, Grizzlies head coach Marc Iavaroni placed Stoudamire on the inactive list and used inexperienced rookie Mike Conley Jr. as the starting point guard, causing Stoudamire to look for a trade or a buyout. On January 26, 2008, the Grizzlies reached a tentative contractual buyout agreement with Stoudamire, with the San Antonio Spurs, Boston Celtics, Phoenix Suns, Denver Nuggets and Toronto Raptors registering strong interest in signing him. On January 28, the buyout was completed and Stoudamire was placed on waivers. The Celtics initially showed strong interest in Stoudamire but since set their sights on the Los Angeles Clippers' Sam Cassell. According to Stoudamire's agent, Stoudamire was to sign with the Spurs.

=== San Antonio Spurs (2008) ===
On February 3, 2008, Stoudamire signed a contract with the San Antonio Spurs. He briefly started for the Spurs while Tony Parker was injured, but then was relegated to spot duty throughout the rest of the season and the playoffs.

Stoudamire considered going to camp with the Houston Rockets, but he did not attend training camp.

== Coaching ==
=== Rice Owls men's basketball team (2008–2009) ===
In December 2008, Stoudamire accepted a coaching position as director of player development for the guard-heavy Rice University Owls squad under head coach Ben Braun.

=== Memphis Grizzlies (2009–2011) ===
In February 2009, Stoudamire joined the coaching staff of the Grizzlies, along with Henry Bibby.

=== Return to college (2011–2021) ===
In May 2011, Stoudamire joined the coaching staff of the University of Memphis Tigers men's basketball team, where his coaching and recruiting contributions were noted with enthusiasm during the 2011–2012 season.

In May 2013, Stoudamire left Memphis to join the coaching staff of the Arizona Wildcats men's basketball team.

In May 2015, Stoudamire left Arizona to rejoin the coaching staff of the Memphis Tigers men's basketball team.

In March 2016, Stoudamire left Memphis to take over the head coaching position for the Pacific Tigers men's basketball team.

Before Arizona hired Gonzaga men's basketball assistant coach Tommy Lloyd to be their next head coach, Stoudamire was considered among the favorites to be the next coach at his alma mater.

=== Boston Celtics (2021–2023) ===
In July 2021, Stoudamire left Pacific to accept an assistant coach position with the Boston Celtics.

=== Georgia Tech (2023–2026) ===
On March 13, 2023, Stoudamire was announced as the new head coach of the Georgia Tech Yellow Jackets. Damon Stoudamire became the first Tech coach in the Yellow Jackets’ ACC history to defeat Duke in his first try when the Yellow Jackets stunned the then seventh ranked Blue Devils 72–68 on December 2, 2023. He became the third coach in ACC history to beat Duke and North Carolina in his first year when on January 30, 2024, Tech beat #3 UNC 74–73 in front of a sold out McCamish Pavilion crowd. On March 8, 2026, Georgia Tech announced they had fired Stoudamire. Stoudamire finishes his three seasons at Tech with an overall 42–55 record.

== Career statistics ==
Legend
GP	Games played	GS	Games started	MPG	Minutes per game
FG%	Field goal percentage	3P%	3-point field goal percentage	FT%	Free throw percentage
RPG	Rebounds per game	APG	Assists per game	SPG	Steals per game
BPG	Blocks per game	PPG	Points per game	**Bold**	Career high
*	Led the league

=== NBA ===
==== Regular season ====
Year	Team	GP	GS	MPG	FG%	3P%	FT%	RPG	APG	SPG	BPG	PPG
1995–96	Toronto	70	70	40.9	.426	**.395**	.797	4.0	**9.3**	1.4	**.3**	19.0
1996–97	Toronto	81	81	40.9	.401	.355	.823	4.1	8.8	1.5	.2	**20.2**
1997–98	Toronto	49	49	**41.5**	.425	.317	.844	**4.4**	8.1	**1.6**	.1	19.4
1997–98	Portland	22	22	36.6	.364	.263	.787	3.7	8.2	1.5	.1	12.4
1998–99	Portland	50*	50*	33.5	.396	.310	.730	3.3	6.2	1.0	.1	12.6
1999–00	Portland	78	78	30.4	.432	.377	.841	3.1	5.2	1.0	.0	12.5
2000–01	Portland	**82**	**82***	32.4	**.434**	.374	.831	3.7	5.7	1.3	.1	13.0
2001–02	Portland	75	71	37.3	.402	.353	.888	3.9	6.5	.9	.1	13.5
2002–03	Portland	59	27	22.3	.376	.386	.791	2.6	3.5	.7	.1	6.9
2003–04	Portland	**82**	**82**	38.0	.401	.365	.876	3.8	6.1	1.2	.1	13.4
2004–05	Portland	81	70	34.1	.392	.369	**.915**	3.8	5.7	1.1	.0	15.8
2005–06	Memphis	27	27	31.9	.397	.346	.855	3.5	4.7	.7	.0	11.7
2006–07	Memphis	62	51	24.2	.391	.337	.795	2.2	4.8	.8	.0	7.5
2007–08	Memphis	29	29	21.5	.397	.383	.808	2.4	3.9	.7	.0	7.3
2007–08	San Antonio	31	4	13.3	.301	.255	.750	1.5	1.7	.4	.1	3.4
Career		878	793	33.2	.406	.357	.833	3.5	6.1	1.1	.1	13.4

==== Playoffs ====
Year	Team	GP	GS	MPG	FG%	3P%	FT%	RPG	APG	SPG	BPG	PPG
1998	Portland	4	4	**41.5**	.397	.364	**1.000**	4.3	**9.5**	**1.3**	**.3**	**17.8**
1999	Portland	13	13	31.0	.380	.455	.706	3.2	5.6	.6	.1	10.2
2000	Portland	**16**	**16**	27.9	.415	.333	.833	2.6	3.6	.5	**.3**	8.9
2001	Portland	3	3	38.0	.413	.154	**1.000**	3.0	4.3	.7	**.3**	17.7
2002	Portland	3	3	33.0	.227	**.750**	.667	2.3	3.3	.7	.0	5.0
2003	Portland	7	6	33.1	**.456**	.484	.952	**5.1**	5.6	.9	**.3**	15.3
2008	San Antonio	7	0	5.0	.333	.250	.667	1.0	.3	.1	.0	1.9
Career		53	45	28.2	.399	.389	.847	3.0	4.4	.6	.2	10.1

=== College ===
Year	Team	GP	GS	MPG	FG%	3P%	FT%	RPG	APG	SPG	BPG	PPG
1991–92	Arizona	30	0	18.0	.455	.406	.771	2.2	2.5	.7	.1	7.2
1992–93	Arizona	28	27	31.1	.438	.382	.791	4.1	5.7	1.6	**.2**	11.0
1993–94	Arizona	**35**	**35**	33.3	.448	.351	.800	**4.5**	5.9	1.6	.1	18.3
1994–95	Arizona	30	30	**36.4**	**.476**	**.465**	**.826**	4.3	**7.3**	**1.7**	.0	**22.8**
Career		123	92	29.8	.457	.402	.804	3.8	5.4	1.4	.1	15.0

== Head coaching record ==
Record table
Season	Team	Overall	Conference	Standing	Postseason
Pacific Tigers (West Coast Conference) (2016–2021)
2016–17	Pacific	11–22	4–14	9th	
2017–18	Pacific	14–18	9–9	T–4th	
2018–19	Pacific	14–18	4–12	9th	
2019–20	Pacific	23–10	11–5	T–3rd	
2020–21	Pacific	9–9	6–7	5th	
Pacific:		71–77 (.480)	34–47 (.420)		
Georgia Tech Yellow Jackets (Atlantic Coast Conference) (2023–2026)
2023–24	Georgia Tech	14–18	7–13	T–12th	
2024–25	Georgia Tech	17–17	10–10	8th	NIT First Round
2025–26	Georgia Tech	11–20	2–16	18th	
Georgia Tech:		42–55 (.433)	19–39 (.328)		
Total:		113–132 (.461)			

== Personal life ==
Stoudamire is the cousin of former NBA players Salim Stoudamire and Terrence Jones, and current NBA player Grant Williams. He is also the nephew of former Portland State University quarterback Anthony Stoudamire and former Portland State University halfback Charles Stoudamire.

=== Marijuana possession ===
Stoudamire's stint with the Portland Trail Blazers was marred by several marijuana-related incidents, including one during the 2002–03 season where, with then-starting power forward Rasheed Wallace, his yellow Hummer was pulled over on Interstate 5 for speeding and driving under the influence of marijuana. Neither Wallace or Stoudamire were driving at the time the hummer was pulled over. In July 2003, after Stoudamire's third arrest for marijuana possession, he was fined $250,000 and was suspended by the team for three months. Blazers president Steve Patterson announced that he wanted to void Stoudamire's contract, but did not find a provision in the contract that would allow him to do so.

Stoudamire completed a 90-day rehabilitation program. In addition, he made an agreement with The Oregonian sports columnist John Canzano to take an unannounced urine test during any point of the 2003–04 season to prove his sobriety. Midway through the season, Canzano appeared in the team locker room and produced a specimen bottle which Stoudamire filled. An independent testing laboratory reported back the result that he was indeed clean. The incident rehabilitated Stoudamire in the minds of many Portland fans, who had come to regard him as one of the "Jail Blazers". However, Stoudamire was criticized by the National Basketball Players Association for the drug test, which claimed that NBA players may only submit to such tests as prescribed by the NBA Collective Bargaining Agreement. The fact that the test was voluntary, and not administered by the league or any of its teams, did not make Stoudamire immune to such criticism. Despite the criticism, no official action was taken by the union against Stoudamire for his participation in the test.

In an interview on The Post Game Podcast after retiring, Stoudamire voiced his frustration with how the city received the team and the incident, saying he and his teammates "Were just kids" when it happened.

== See also ==
- Toronto Raptors accomplishments and records
