= Toronto Raptors accomplishments and records =

This page details the all-time statistics, records, and other achievements pertaining to the Toronto Raptors of the National Basketball Association.

== Individual accomplishments ==
=== All-NBA Team ===
All-NBA
First Team
Player	Years
None
Second Team
Vince Carter	2001
Chris Bosh	2007
DeMar DeRozan	2018
Kawhi Leonard	2019
Pascal Siakam	2020
Third Team
Vince Carter	2000
Kyle Lowry	2016
DeMar DeRozan	2017
Pascal Siakam	2022

=== All-NBA Defensive Team ===
All-NBA Defensive Team
First Team
Player	Years
None
Second Team
Kawhi Leonard	2019
OG Anunoby	2023
Scottie Barnes	2026

=== All-Star Selections ===
All-Stars
Player	Appearances	Years
Scottie Barnes	2	2024, 2026
Chris Bosh	5	2006, 2007, 2008, 2009, 2010
Vince Carter	5	2000, 2001, 2002, 2003, 2004
Antonio Davis	1	2001
DeMar DeRozan	4	2014, 2016, 2017, 2018
Brandon Ingram	1	2026
Kawhi Leonard	1	2019
Kyle Lowry	6	2015, 2016, 2017, 2018, 2019, 2020
Pascal Siakam	2	2020, 2023
Fred VanVleet	1	2022

All-Star Coaches
Coach	Appearances	Years
Dwane Casey	1	2018
Nick Nurse	1	2020

=== All-Star Rookie Game ===
All-Star Rookies
Player	Year
Damon Stoudamire	1996
Marcus Camby	1997
Tracy McGrady	1998

=== All-Star Rising Stars Challenge Game (formerly known as All-Star Rookie/Sophomore Challenge Game) ===
All-Star Rookies/Sophomores
Rookie
Player	Years
Morris Peterson	2001
Chris Bosh	2004
Charlie Villanueva	2006
Andrea Bargnani	2007
Jorge Garbajosa	2007
Jamario Moon	2008
Scottie Barnes	2022
Sophomore
Morris Peterson	2002
Chris Bosh	2005
Andrea Bargnani	2018
DeMar DeRozan	2011
Jonas Valančiūnas	2014
OG Anunoby	2019
Precious Achiuwa	2022
Scottie Barnes	2023

=== Slam Dunk champion ===
Slam Dunk champions
Player	Year
Vince Carter	2000
Terrence Ross	2013

=== Three-Point Shootout champion ===
Three-Point Shootout champions
Player	Year
Jason Kapono	2008

=== NBA Most Valuable Player ===
- None

=== NBA Finals Most Valuable Player ===
NBA Finals Most Valuable Player
Player	Year
Kawhi Leonard	2019

NBA Defensive Player of the Year

- None

=== NBA Most Improved Player ===
Most Improved Player
Player	Year
Pascal Siakam	2019

=== Retired jerseys ===
Toronto Raptors retired numbers
No.	Player	Position	Tenure	Date
15	Vince Carter	G/F	1998–2004	2 November 2024

=== Coach of the Year ===
Coaches of the Year
Coach	Year
Sam Mitchell	2007
Dwane Casey	2018
Nick Nurse	2020

=== Executive of the Year ===
Executives of the Year
Executive	Year
Bryan Colangelo	2007

=== Rookie of the Year ===
Rookies of the Year
Player	Year
Damon Stoudamire	1996
Vince Carter	1999
Scottie Barnes	2022

=== Sixth Man of the Year ===
Sixth Man of the Year
Player	Year
Lou Williams	2015

=== All-Rookie ===
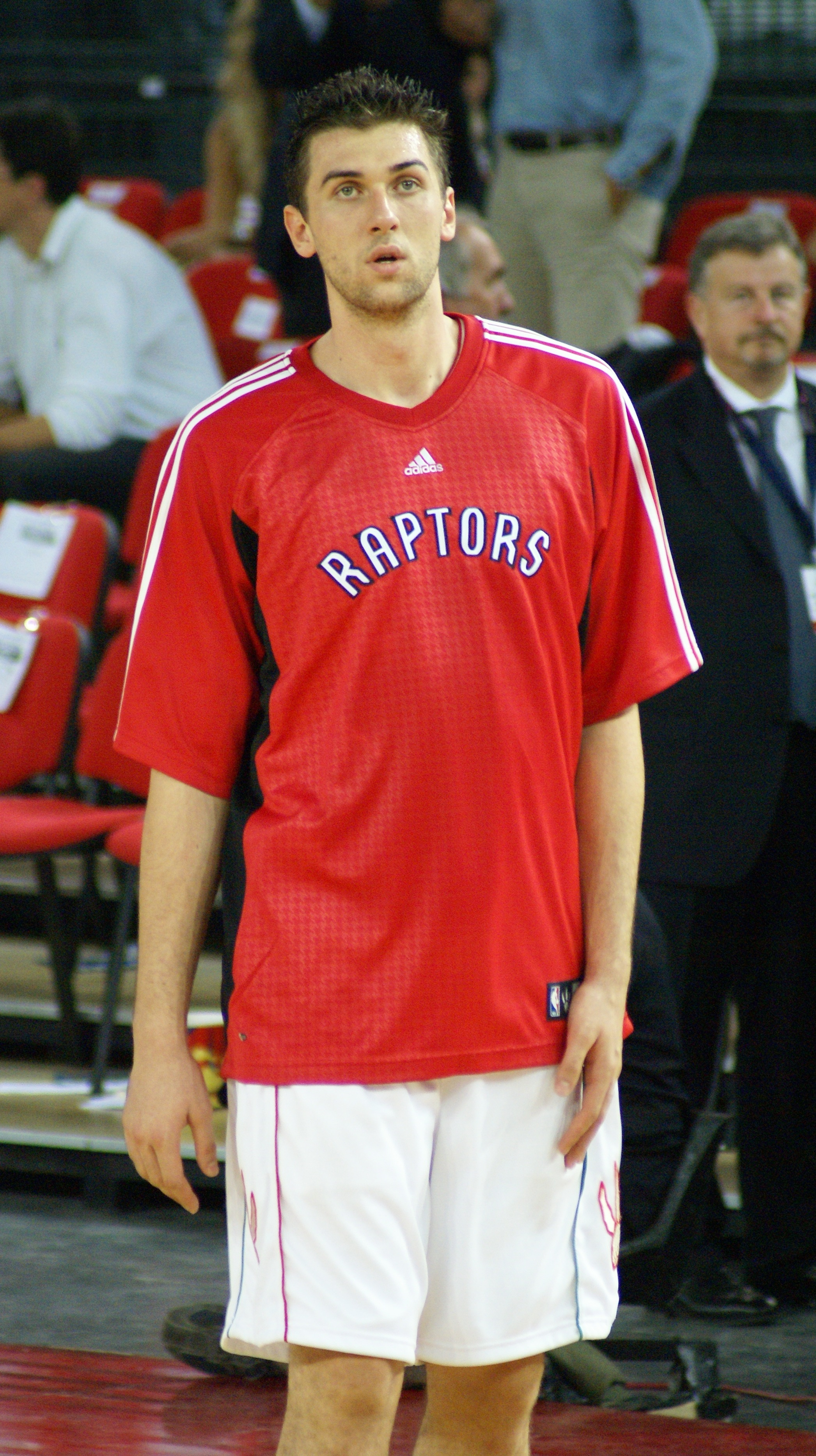
Andrea Bargnani, Toronto's number one pick in the 2006 NBA draft, made the All-Rookie First Team in 2007.

All-Rookies
First Team
Player	Year
Damon Stoudamire	1996
Marcus Camby	1997
Vince Carter	1999
Morris Peterson	2001
Chris Bosh	2004
Charlie Villanueva	2006
Andrea Bargnani	2007
Jorge Garbajosa	2007
Scottie Barnes	2022
Second Team
Jamario Moon	2008
Jonas Valančiūnas	2013
Terence Davis II	2020
Collin Murray-Boyles	2026

=== Conference Player of the Week* ===
Conference Players of the Week
Player	Times won	Week
DeMar DeRozan	10	7 December 2015; 7 November 2016; 12 December 2016; 9 January 2017; 20 March 2017; 13 November 2017; 18 December 2017; 1 January 2018; 26 February 2018; 5 March 2018
Chris Bosh	7	3 January 2005; 30 January 2006; 26 March 2007; 7 January 2008; 28 October 2008; 1 February 2010; 5 April 2010
Vince Carter	7	21 March 1999; 15 November 1999; 21 February 2000; 25 February 2001; 5 November 2001; 1 December 2003; 15 March 2004
Kyle Lowry	5	27 January 2014; 1 December 2014; 22 February 2016; 14 March 2016; 16 December 2019
Pascal Siakam	5	5 November 2018; 4 November 2019; 20 January 2020; 7 February 2022; 26 December 2022
Kawhi Leonard	2	26 November 2018; 7 January 2019
Mike James	1	2 January 2006
Norman Powell	1	3 March 2020
Jalen Rose	1	22 February 2005
Fred VanVleet	1	10 January 2022
Lou Williams	1	17 November 2014

=== Conference Player of the Month* ===
Conference Players of the Month
Player	Month
Chris Bosh	January 2007
Kyle Lowry	December 2014; January 2016
DeMar DeRozan	April 2015; January 2016; January 2018

=== Conference Rookie of the Month* ===
Conference Rookies of the Month
Player	Month
Damon Stoudamire	November 1995; January 1996
Marcus Camby	March 1997
Vince Carter	March 1999; April 1999
Charlie Villanueva	December 2005
Jorge Garbajosa	December 2006
Andrea Bargnani	January 2007; February 2007
Jamario Moon	January 2008
Jonas Valančiūnas	March 2013
Norman Powell	April 2016
Malachi Flynn	April 2021
Scottie Barnes	February 2022; March 2022

=== Conference Coach of the Month* ===
Conference Coaches of the Month
Coach	Month
Sam Mitchell	January 2007
Dwane Casey	December 2013; November 2014; January 2016; December 2016; December 2017
Nick Nurse	November 2018; November 2019; January 2020

=== In a rookie season ===
- Most points scored by a rookie in one game with 48 – Charlie Villanueva, vs. Milwaukee Bucks, 26 March 2006
- Most points in rookie season – Damon Stoudamire with 1,331 points
- Most blocks in rookie season – Marcus Camby with 130 blocks
- Most assists in rookie season – Damon Stoudamire with 653 assists
- Most assists by a rookie in one game with 19 – Damon Stoudamire, vs. Houston Rockets, 2 February 1996
- Most rebounds in rookie season – Chris Bosh with 557 rebounds

=== Eurobasket ===
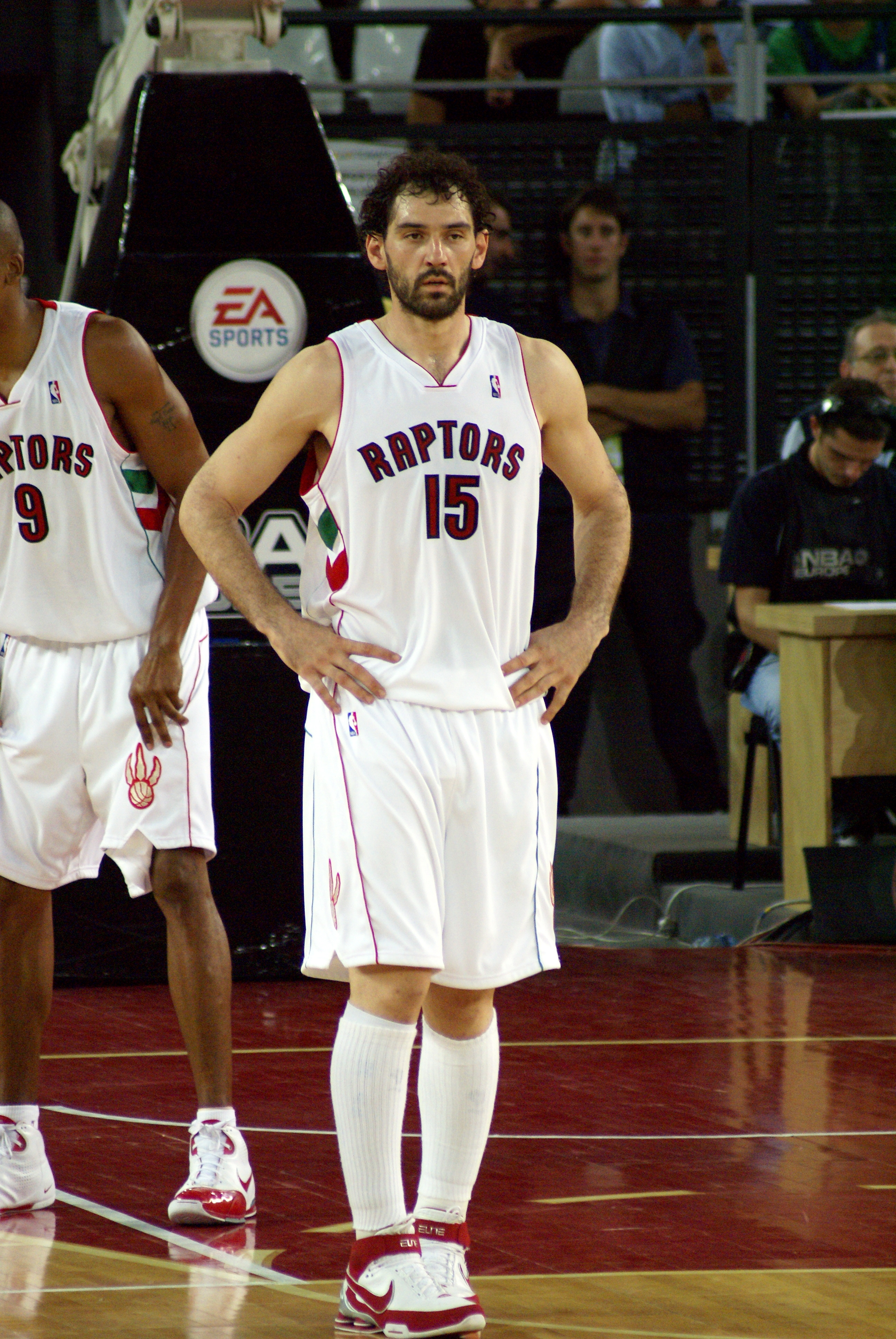
Jorge Garbajosa represented Spain at Eurobasket 2007.

EuroBasket 2007:

- (Spain) José Calderón (silver)
- (Spain) Jorge Garbajosa (silver)

EuroBasket 2011:

- (Spain) José Calderón (gold)

EuroBasket 2013:

- (Lithuania) Jonas Valančiūnas (silver)

EuroBasket 2015:

- (Lithuania) Jonas Valančiūnas (silver)

EuroBasket 2022:

- (Spain) Juancho Hernangómez (gold)

=== World Championship ===
2002 FIBA World Championship:

- (United States) Antonio Davis

2003 FIBA Americas Championship:

- (United States) Vince Carter

2006 FIBA World Championship:

- (United States) Chris Bosh (bronze)
- (Spain) José Calderón (gold)
- (Spain) Jorge Garbajosa (gold)

2010 FIBA World Championship:

- (Australia) David Andersen
- (Brazil) Leandro Barbosa
- (Lithuania) Linas Kleiza (bronze)

2014 FIBA World Championship:

- (United States) DeMar DeRozan (gold)
- (Lithuania) Jonas Valančiūnas (fourth)

2019 FIBA Basketball World Cup:

- (Spain) Marc Gasol (gold)

2023 FIBA Basketball World Cup:

- (Germany) Dennis Schröder (gold)

=== Olympics ===
1996 Summer Olympics:

- (Croatia) Žan Tabak

2000 Summer Olympics:

- (United States) Vince Carter (gold)

2008 Summer Olympics:

- (United States) Chris Bosh (gold)
- (Spain) José Calderón (silver)
- (Croatia) Roko Ukić

2012 Summer Olympics:

- (Spain) José Calderón (silver)
- (Lithuania) Linas Kleiza
- (Lithuania) Jonas Valančiūnas

2016 Summer Olympics:

- (United States) DeMar DeRozan (gold)
- (United States) Kyle Lowry (gold)
- (Lithuania) Jonas Valančiūnas

2020 Summer Olympics:

- (Australia) Aron Baynes
- (Japan) Yuta Watanabe

2024 Summer Olympics:

- (Canada) R.J. Barrett
- (Canada) Kelly Olynyk

Note: Beginning with the 2001–02 season the NBA began selecting a Player of the Week, Player of the Month and Rookie of the Month in both the Eastern and Western Conference. Beginning with the 2002–03 season the NBA began selecting a Coach of the Month in both the Eastern and Western Conference. Prior to selecting a winner in each conference a single winner for the entire league was selected for each of the aforementioned awards.

== Team records ==
=== Regular season ===
- Most points in a game – 145 vs. Golden State Warriors, 20 January 2026 (W 145–127)
- Most points in a non-OT game – 145 vs. Golden State Warriors, 20 January 2026 (W 145–127)
- Most points in a home game – 142 vs. Detroit Pistons, 19 November 2023 (W 142–113)
- Most assists in a game – 44 vs. Detroit Pistons, 19 November 2023 (W 142–113)
- Most rebounds in a game – 65 vs. New York Knicks, 21 March 1999 (W 85–81 (OT))
- Most blocks in a game – 23 vs. Atlanta Hawks, 23 March 2001 (W 112–86)
- Most steals in a game – 18 vs. Denver Nuggets, 25 February 1997 (W 124–122 (OT))
- Fewest points in a game – 56 vs. Minnesota Timberwolves, 1 November 2003 (L 73–56)
- Fewest assists in a game – 6 vs. Indiana Pacers, 24 February 1999 (L 104–84); vs. Atlanta Hawks, 13 March 1999 (L 86–75)
- Fewest rebounds in a game – 24 vs. Miami Heat, 15 February 1998 (L 116–95); vs. Boston Celtics, 5 November 2014 (W 110–107)
- Most points in a half – 87 (1st half) vs. Cleveland Cavaliers, 10 April 2021 (W 135–115)
- Fewest points in a half – 23 (1st half) vs. Washington Wizards, 7 November 2003 (L 86–60); (2nd half) vs. Miami Heat, 18 April 2012 (L 96–72)
- Most points allowed in a half – 84 (1st half) vs. Golden State Warriors, 25 March 2011 (L 138–100)
- Fewest points allowed in a half – 22 (2nd half) vs. Philadelphia 76ers, 4 April 2012 (W 99–78)
- Largest point differential in a half – +40 (77–37) (1st half) vs. Utah Jazz, 1 December 2019 (W 130–110)
- Largest point deficit in a half – –37 (64–27) (2nd half) vs. Indiana Pacers, 9 November 2002 (L 108–84)
- Most points in a quarter – 49 (1st quarter) vs. Denver Nuggets, 14 March 2023 (W 125–110)
- Fewest points in a quarter – 4 (2nd quarter) vs. Washington Wizards, 7 November 2003 (L 86–60)
- Most points allowed in a quarter – 49 (4th quarter) vs. Chicago Bulls, 22 December 2014 (L 129–120); (3rd quarter) vs. Utah Jazz, 1 December 2019
- Fewest points allowed in a quarter – 2 (4th quarter) vs. Golden State Warriors, 8 February 2004 (W 84–81 (OT))
- Largest point differential in a quarter – +32 (46–14) (3rd quarter) vs. Golden State Warriors, 2 April 2021 (W 130–77)
- Largest point deficit in a quarter – –27 (42–15) (4th quarter) vs. Golden State Warriors, 3 December 2013 (L 112–103)
- Most blocks in one half – 16 vs. Atlanta Hawks, 23 March 2001 (W 112–86)
- Fewest points combined in a quarter – 18 vs. Boston Celtics, 12 January 2001 (W 93–72)
- Biggest margin of victory in a home game – 53, vs. Golden State Warriors, 2 April 2021 (W 130–77)
- Biggest margin of victory in a road game – 37, vs. New Jersey Nets, 1 November 2007 (W 106–69)
- Biggest margin of defeat in a home game – 44, vs. New York Knicks, 27 March 2024 (L 145–101)
- Biggest margin of defeat in a road game – 54, vs Boston Celtics, 31 December 2024 (L 125–71)
- Most points given up in a home game – 140, vs. Phoenix Suns, 31 March 2006; vs. Utah Jazz, 12 November 2012 (3 OT)
- Most points given up in a road game – 152, vs. Los Angeles Clippers, 13 March 1998
- Fewest points given up in a home game – 54, vs. Miami Heat, 19 March 2008
- Fewest points given up in a road game – 64, vs. Detroit Pistons, 23 December 2009
- Fewest points scored by both teams in a half in a home game – 68, vs. Detroit Pistons, 26 March 2008
- Biggest deficit overcome – 30, vs. Dallas Mavericks, 22 December 2019
- Most assists in a game – 42, vs. Golden State Warriors, 20 December 2026
- Most rebounds in a game – 65, vs. New York Knicks, 21 March 1999
- Most blocks – 23, vs. Atlanta Hawks, 23 March 2001
- Most steals – 18, vs. Denver Nuggets, 25 February 1997 (OT)
- Most field goals made – 53, vs. Cleveland Cavaliers, 12 April 2021 (W 135–115)
- Most field goals attempted – 114, vs. Houston Rockets, 11 November 2013 (2 OT)
- Most three-point field goals made in a game – 24, vs. Denver Nuggets, 24 March 2021
- Most three-point field goals made in a quarter – 8, vs. New Orleans Hornets, 7 November 2009
- Most three-point field goals attempted in a game – 48, vs. Denver Nuggets, 24 March 2021
- Most free throws made in a game – 41, vs. Milwaukee Bucks, 18 November 2000
- Most free throws attempted in a game – 49, vs. Milwaukee Bucks, 18 November 2000
- Longest winning streak – 15, 15 January 2020 – 12 February 2020
- Longest home winning streak – 12, 7 November 2017 – 1 January 2018
- Longest road winning streak – 10, 4 January 2020 – 12 February 2020
- Most 100 or more point game streak – 23, 28 January 2018 – 20 March 2018
- Most total points in a season – 9,400 (2025–26 season)
- Most points per game in a season – 114.6 (2025–26 season)
- Most home game sellouts – 41 out of 41 (2015–16, 2016–17, 2017–18, and 2018–19 seasons)
- Highest winning percentage to finish a season – .736 (53–19) (2019–20 season)
- Most different starting lineups in a season – 38 (2020–21 season)
- Most players in a season to score at least 30 points in a game – 10 (2020–21 season)
- Most steals in a season – 772 (2022–23 season)
- Largest comeback - 30 vs the Dallas Mavericks on 22 December 2019

=== Record for wins ===
Regular season wins
Wins	Season
Most wins
59	2017–18
Most home wins
34	2017–18
Most road wins
27	2019–20
Best start to the season
6–0	2018–19
Playoffs wins
Most wins in the playoffs
16	2018–19
Most wins in a playoff series
4	2018–19

=== Record for championships ===
Championships
Championships	Seasons
NBA championships
1	2019
Conference championships
1	2019
Division championships
7	2007; 2014; 2015; 2016; 2018; 2019; 2020

=== Playoffs ===
- Most points in a game – 150, vs. Brooklyn Nets, 23 August 2020
- Most points in a half – 77, vs. Brooklyn Nets, 23 August 2020
- Biggest margin of victory in a home game – 36, vs. Philadelphia 76ers, 7 May 2019
- Most points in a home game – 134, vs. Brooklyn Nets, 17 August 2020
- Most points in a half in a home game – 76, vs. Washington Wizards, 17 April 2018
- Most points in a quarter in a home game – 44, vs. Washington Wizards, 17 April 2018
- Most points allowed in a game – 128, vs. Cleveland Cavaliers, 2 May 2018; vs. Cleveland Cavaliers, 7 May 2018
- Most assists in a game – 39, vs. Brooklyn Nets, 23 August 2020
- Most rebounds in a game – 58, vs. Brooklyn Nets, 23 August 2020
- Most blocks in a game – 11, vs. Philadelphia 76ers, 13 May 2001
- Most steals in a game – 15, vs. Miami Heat, 5 May 2016
- Most field goals made in a game – 56, vs. Brooklyn Nets, 23 August 2020
- Most field goals attempted in a game – 101, vs. Brooklyn Nets, 23 August 2020
- Most three-point field goals made in a game – 22, vs. Brooklyn Nets, 17 August 2020; vs. Brooklyn Nets, 23 August 2020
- Most three-point field goals attempted in a game – 47, vs. Brooklyn Nets, 23 August 2020
- Most free throws made in a game – 33, vs. New York Knicks, 26 April 2001
- Most free throws attempted in a game – 43, vs. Miami Heat, 15 May 2016
- Most points scored from the bench in a game – 100, vs. Brooklyn Nets, 23 August 2020
- Fewest games to win a playoff series – 4 games (4–0 best of 7 series sweep), vs. Brooklyn Nets, 17–23 August 2020

== NBA records ==
=== Regular season ===
- Second most steals in one half with 8 – Doug Christie (tied with 10 others), vs. Philadelphia 76ers, 2 April 1997
- Longest streak of consecutive two three-pointers per game for a starting centre with 10 – Andrea Bargnani
- Highest free throw percentage in a season with 0.981 – José Calderón (2008–09 season)
- Most consecutive games with at least one successful three-point field goal made as a team – 986 consecutive games (26 February 1999 – 24 January 2011)
- Most players in a season to score 30-plus points in a game with 10 – Paul Watson, Stanley Johnson, OG Anunoby, Jalen Harris, Gary Trent Jr. (2), Kyle Lowry (2), Chris Boucher (3), Fred VanVleet (6), Norman Powell (6), Pascal Siakam (9) – (2020–21 season)

=== Playoffs ===
- Most consecutive 3-pointers made by a player in a half with 8 (first half) – Vince Carter vs. Philadelphia 76ers, 11 May 2001
- Most 3-pointers made by a player in a half with 8 (first half) – Vince Carter vs. Philadelphia 76ers, 11 May 2001
- Most consecutive 3-pointers made by a player in a game with 8 (tied with Chris Paul) – Vince Carter vs. Philadelphia 76ers, 11 May 2001
- Most free throws in an NBA Finals game without a miss with 16-of-16 from the free throw line – Kawhi Leonard vs. Golden State Warriors, 2 June 2019
- Most 3-pointers by a bench player in the NBA Finals with 16 – Fred VanVleet vs. Golden State Warriors, 30 May 2019 – 13 June 2019
- Most points from the bench in a game – 100 vs. Brooklyn Nets, 23 August 2020

=== Other accomplishments and records ===
- First team in NBA history to sweep the three monthly awards (Eastern Conference): Player of the Month (Chris Bosh), Rookie of the Month (Andrea Bargnani) and Coach of the Month (Sam Mitchell), January 2007
- First non-American team to win an NBA title, 2019
- First team to win an NBA title without a lottery pick, 2019
- Longest single-season championship reign – 486 days, 13 June 2019 – 11 October 2020
- First team in NBA history to play 5 players for 50-plus minutes in a game during the shot clock era – Gary Trent Jr. (55:39), Scottie Barnes (56:20), Pascal Siakam (56:31), OG Anunoby (55:49), Fred VanVleet (53:31) vs. Miami Heat – 29 January 2022

== Franchise records for regular season ==
Bold denotes still active with team.

Italic denotes still active but not with team.

=== Games played ===
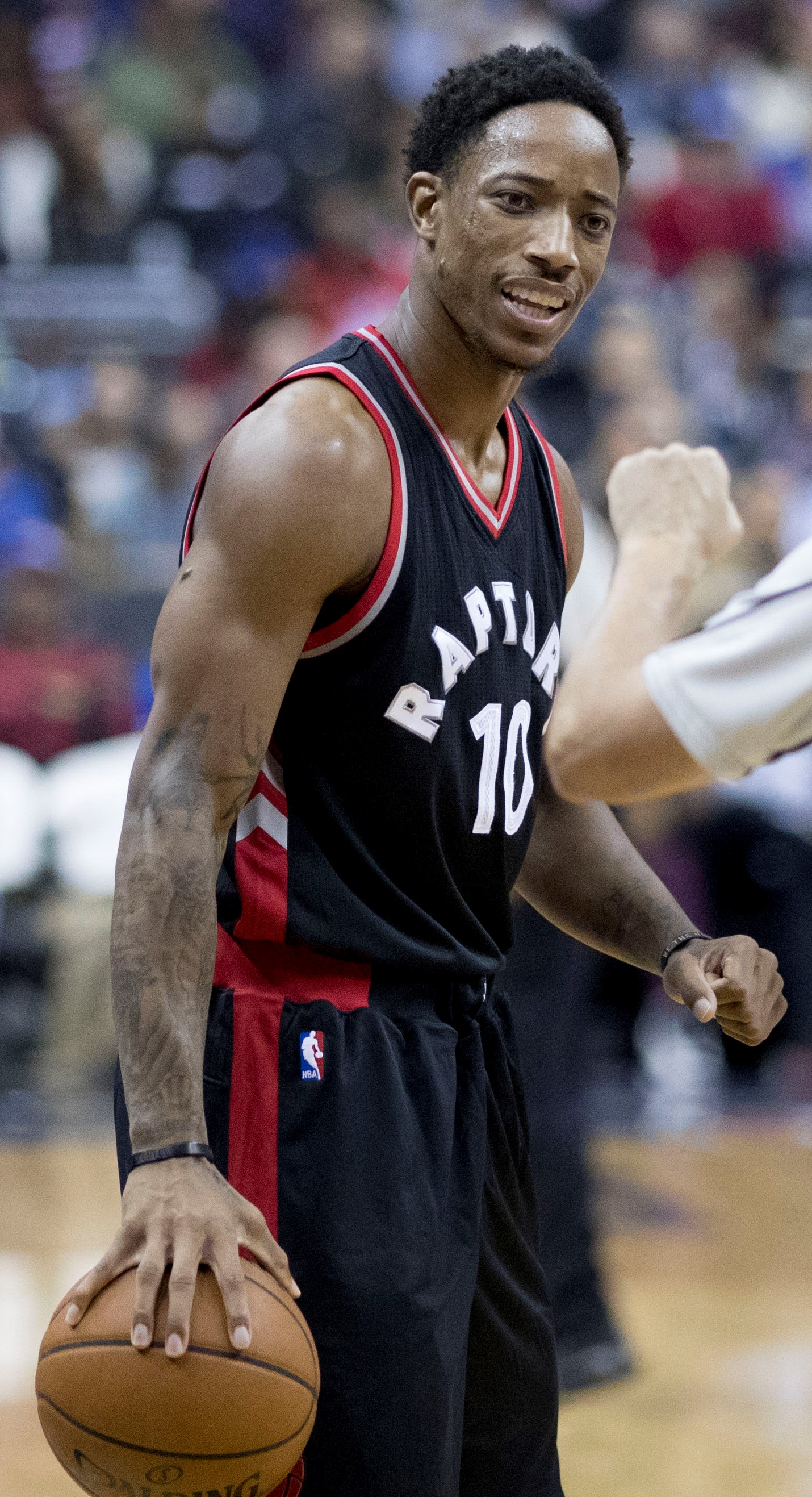
DeMar DeRozan was one of the faces of the Raptors franchise, and holds their all-time records for most games played, minutes played, points scored, field goals made, & free throws made. He also shares the franchise record with Kyle Lowry for most consecutive seasons played.

==== Most games played all-time ====
(Correct as of the end of the 2025–26 season)

Most games played all-time
Player	Games
DeMar DeRozan	675
Kyle Lowry	601
Morris Peterson	542
José Calderón	525
Pascal Siakam	510
Chris Bosh	509
Jonas Valančiūnas	470
Amir Johnson	451
Andrea Bargnani	433
Alvin Williams	417
Fred VanVleet	417
Chris Boucher	406
Vince Carter	403
OG Anunoby	395
Terrence Ross	363
**Scottie Barnes**	356
Norman Powell	349
**Jakob Pöltl**	315
Doug Christie	314
Antonio Davis	310

==== Most consecutive games played ====
(Correct as of the end of the 2025–26 season)

Most consecutive games played
Player	Games	Dates
Morris Peterson	371	12 February 2002 to 22 November 2006

==== Most consecutive seasons played ====
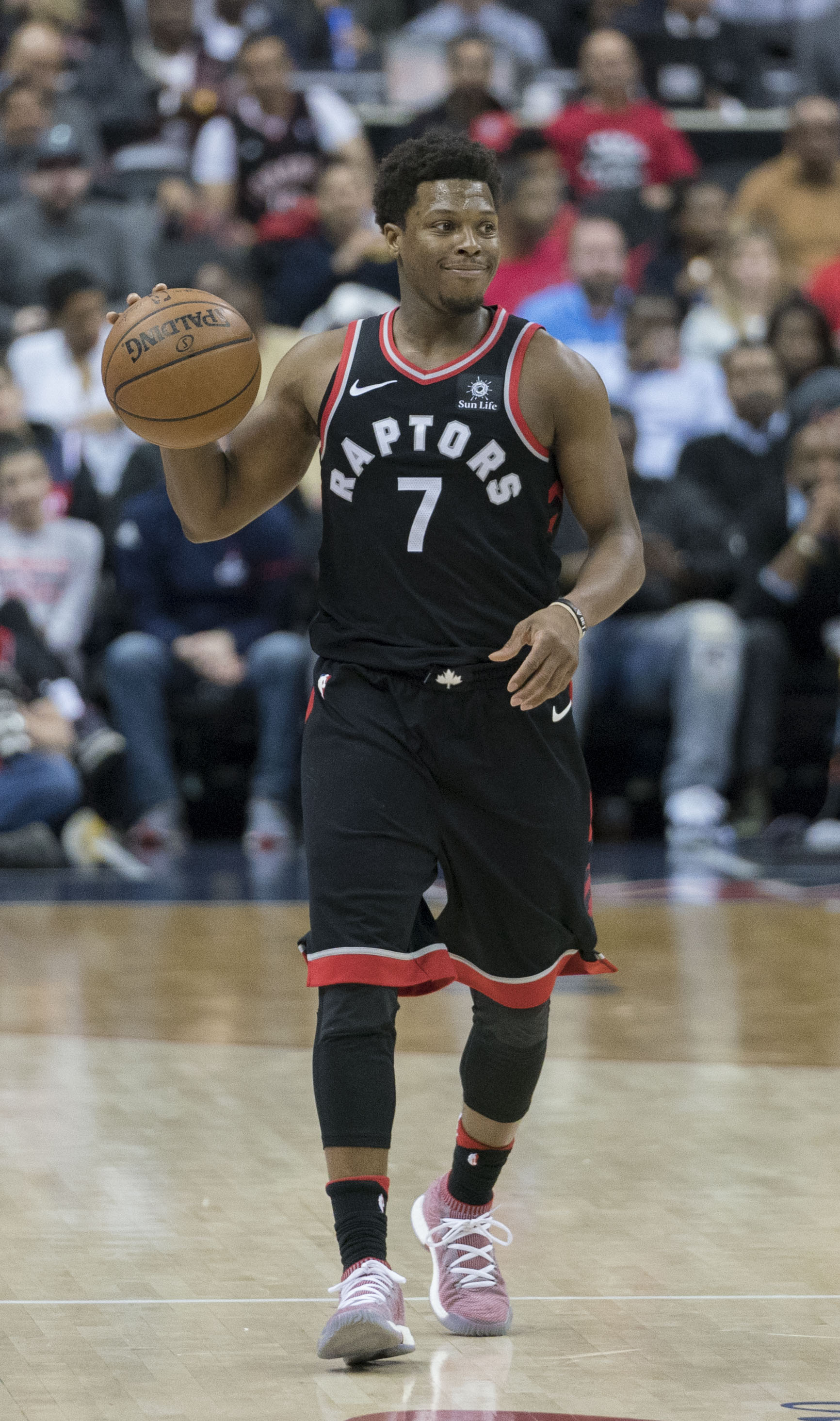
Since joining the Raptors in 2012, Kyle Lowry has become one of the faces of the franchise & their longest tenured player. He holds their all-time records for most assists, steals, 3-point field goals made, 3-point field goals attempted, & triple-doubles. He also shares the franchise record with DeMar DeRozan for most consecutive seasons played.

(Correct as of 2024–25 season)

Most consecutive seasons played
Player	Seasons
9 seasons
DeMar DeRozan	9
Kyle Lowry	9
8 seasons
José Calderón	8
Pascal Siakam	8
7 seasons
Alvin Williams	7
Vince Carter	7
Morris Peterson	7
Chris Bosh	7
Andrea Bargnani	7
Jonas Valančiūnas	7
Fred VanVleet	7
OG Anunoby	7
Chris Boucher	7

=== Minutes ===
==== Most minutes played all-time ====
(Correct as of the 2025–26 season)

Most minutes played all-time
Player	Minutes
DeMar DeRozan	22,987
Kyle Lowry	20,813
Chris Bosh	18,815
Morris Peterson	16,059
Pascal Siakam	15,786
Vince Carter	15,114
José Calderón	14,909
Andrea Bargnani	13,130
Fred VanVleet	12,397
**Scottie Barnes**	12,203
Jonas Valančiūnas	11,774
Alvin Williams	11,736
Amir Johnson	11,377
OG Anunoby	11,346
Doug Christie	10,916
Antonio Davis	10,809
Terrence Ross	8,444
Damon Stoudamire	8,209
Anthony Parker	7,708
Chris Boucher	7,215

==== Most minutes played in a game ====
(Correct as of 11 April 2022)

Most minutes played in a game
Player	Minutes	Opponent	Date
Vince Carter	63	Sacramento Kings	23 February 2001
DeMar DeRozan	60	Utah Jazz	12 November 2012
John Wallace	57	Atlanta Hawks	26 November 1997
Alvin Williams	57	Sacramento Kings	23 February 2001
DeMar DeRozan	57	Washington Wizards	27 February 2014
Pascal Siakam	57	Miami Heat	29 January 2022

==== Most minutes played in a season ====
(Correct as of the end of the 2025–26 season)

Most minutes played in a season
Player	Minutes	Season
Damon Stoudamire	3,311	1996–97
Morris Peterson	3,140	2005–06
Doug Christie	3,127	1996–97
Vince Carter	3,126	1999–2000
Chris Bosh	3,017	2004–05
DeMar DeRozan	3,017	2013–14
DeMar DeRozan	3,013	2012–13
Vince Carter	2,979	2000–01
Antonio Davis	2,978	2001–02
Morris Peterson	2,949	2002–03

==== Highest minutes per game all-time (minimum 200 games played) ====
(Correct as of the end of the 2025–26 season)

Highest minutes per game all-time
Player	Minutes
Damon Stoudamire	41.0
Vince Carter	37.5
Chris Bosh	37.0
Walt Williams	34.9
Antonio Davis	34.9
Doug Christie	34.8
Kyle Lowry	34.6
**Scottie Barnes**	34.3
DeMar DeRozan	34.1
Jalen Rose	33.4

==== Highest minutes per game in a season (minimum 58 games played) ====
(Correct as of 10 April 2023)

Highest minutes per game in a season
Player	Minutes	Season
Damon Stoudamire	41.5	1997–98
Damon Stoudamire	40.93	1995–96
Damon Stoudamire	40.88	1996–97
Vince Carter	39.8	2001–02
Vince Carter	39.7	2000–01
Jalen Rose	39.4	2003–04
Chris Bosh	39.3	2005–06
Donyell Marshall	39.1	2003–04
Antonio Davis	38.7	2001–02
Doug Christie	38.6	1996–97
Chris Bosh	38.5	2006–07

=== Points ===
==== Most points scored all-time ====
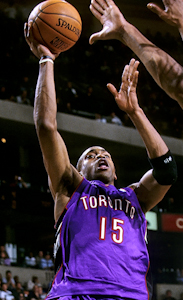
Vince Carter was one of the first faces of the Raptors franchise. He holds their single-season records for the highest points per game (27.6), most points scored (2,107), most field goals made (788) & most attempted (1,696). He also holds their records for highest points per game all-time (23.4), and most games with at least 40 points scored (14).

(Correct as of 16 April 2025)

Most points scored all-time
Player	Points
DeMar DeRozan	13,296
Kyle Lowry	10,540
Chris Bosh	10,275
Vince Carter	9,420
Pascal Siakam	8,875
Andrea Bargnani	6,581
Morris Peterson	6,498
**Scottie Barnes**	6,204
Fred VanVleet	6,090
Jonas Valančiūnas	5,524
José Calderón	5,235
OG Anunoby	4,676
Doug Christie	4,448
Antonio Davis	3,994
Amir Johnson	3,957
Damon Stoudamire	3,917
Alvin Williams	3,876
Gary Trent Jr.	3,680
Chris Boucher	3,612
Norman Powell	3,463
Terrence Ross	3,432

==== Most points scored in a game ====
(Correct as of the end of the 2025–26)

Most points scored in a game
≥50-point games
Player	Points	Opponent	Date
Fred VanVleet	54	Orlando Magic	2 February 2021
DeMar DeRozan	52	Milwaukee Bucks	1 January 2018
Pascal Siakam	52	New York Knicks	21 December 2022
Vince Carter	51	Phoenix Suns	27 February 2000
Terrence Ross	51	Los Angeles Clippers	25 January 2014
48-point games
Vince Carter	48	Milwaukee Bucks	18 November 2000
Charlie Villanueva	48	Milwaukee Bucks	26 March 2006
47-point games
Vince Carter	47	Milwaukee Bucks	7 February 2000
46-point games
Vince Carter	46	Phoenix Suns	30 December 2000
45-point games
Vince Carter	45	Indiana Pacers	20 December 2000
DeMar DeRozan	45	Philadelphia 76ers	21 December 2017
Kawhi Leonard	45	Utah Jazz	1 January 2019
44-point games
Chris Bosh	44	Milwaukee Bucks	7 February 2007
Pascal Siakam	44	Washington Wizards	13 February 2019
**Gary Trent Jr.**	44	Cleveland Cavaliers	10 April 2021
Pascal Siakam	44	Washington Wizards	6 May 2021
43-point games
Vince Carter	43	Utah Jazz	10 November 2001
Vince Carter	43	Houston Rockets	5 March 2002
Vince Carter	43	Atlanta Hawks	8 March 2003
Vince Carter	43	Atlanta Hawks	26 November 2003
Kyle Lowry	43	Cleveland Cavaliers	26 February 2016
DeMar DeRozan	43	Boston Celtics	24 February 2017
Norman Powell	43	Detroit Pistons	17 March 2021
42-point games
Vince Carter	42	Denver Nuggets	7 December 2001
Vince Carter	42	Phoenix Suns	9 December 2001
Vince Carter	42	New Orleans Hornets	21 March 2004
Chris Bosh	42	Phoenix Suns	22 December 2007
Chris Bosh	42	New Jersey Nets	21 November 2008
Chris Bosh	42	Golden State Warriors	4 April 2010
DeMar DeRozan	42	Houston Rockets	30 March 2015
DeMar DeRozan	42	Chicago Bulls	21 March 2017
DeMar DeRozan	42	Golden State Warriors	13 January 2018
DeMar DeRozan	42	Detroit Pistons	7 March 2018
Gary Trent Jr.	42	Houston Rockets	10 February 2022
Gary Trent Jr.	42	Phoenix Suns	11 March 2022
41-point games
Chris Bosh	41	Orlando Magic	7 February 2007
Chris Bosh	41	Cleveland Cavaliers	24 November 2007
Andrea Bargnani	41	New York Knicks	8 December 2010
Kyle Lowry	41	Golden State Warriors	5 December 2015
Kyle Lowry	41	Los Angeles Lakers	1 January 2017
DeMar DeRozan	41	Boston Celtics	10 January 2017
Kawhi Leonard	41	Washington Wizards	13 January 2019
40-point games
Tracy Murray	40	Denver Nuggets	18 March 1996
Acie Earl	40	Boston Celtics	12 April 1996
Vince Carter	40	Charlotte Hornets	14 January 2001
Vince Carter	40	New York Knicks	26 March 2004
Chris Bosh	40	New York Knicks	11 January 2008
Chris Bosh	40	Orlando Magic	20 February 2008
Chris Bosh	40	Orlando Magic	18 November 2008
DeMar DeRozan	40	Dallas Mavericks	22 January 2014
DeMar DeRozan	40	Detroit Pistons	26 October 2016
DeMar DeRozan	40	Washington Wizards	2 November 2016
DeMar DeRozan	40	Miami Heat	23 March 2017
DeMar DeRozan	40	Indiana Pacers	31 March 2017
Kyle Lowry	40	Minnesota Timberwolves	20 January 2018
Pascal Siakam	40	Boston Celtics	28 March 2022
Immanuel Quickley	40	Golden State Warriors	20 January 2026

==== Most points scored in a half ====
(Correct as of the end of the 2025–26)

Most points scored in a half
Player	Points	Half	Opponent	Date
DeMar DeRozan	31	2nd	Boston Celtics	10 January 2017
Pascal Siakam	30	2nd	Washington Wizards	13 February 2019
Pascal Siakam	30	1st	San Antonio Spurs	26 January 2020
Kawhi Leonard	30	2nd	Utah Jazz	1 January 2019
Pascal Siakam	29	2nd	Washington Wizards	13 November 2023
Kyle Lowry	28	2nd	Cleveland Cavaliers	26 February 2016
DeMar DeRozan	28	2nd	Washington Wizards	2 November 2016
Kyle Lowry	28	2nd	Utah Jazz	5 January 2017
DeMar DeRozan	28	2nd	Detroit Pistons	7 March 2018
Fred VanVleet	28	1st	Orlando Magic	2 February 2021
Fred VanVleet	28	2nd	Utah Jazz	7 January 2022

==== Most points scored in a quarter ====
(Correct as of the end of the 2025–26 season)

Most points scored in a quarter
Player	Points	Quarter	Opponent	Date
Pascal Siakam	25	1st	San Antonio Spurs	26 January 2020
Fred VanVleet	24	3rd	Utah Jazz	7 January 2022
Kyle Lowry	22	4th	Atlanta Hawks	2 December 2015
Pascal Siakam	22	3rd	Washington Wizards	13 November 2023
Lou Williams	21	4th	Cleveland Cavaliers	4 March 2015
DeMar DeRozan	21	3rd	Detroit Pistons	26 October 2016
DeMar DeRozan	21	3rd	Houston Rockets	23 November 2016
DeMar DeRozan	21	1st	Milwaukee Bucks	1 January 2018
Danny Green	21	3rd	Memphis Grizzlies	19 January 2019
Pascal Siakam	21	1st	Atlanta Hawks	4 February 2022
Pascal Siakam	21	2nd	Houston Rockets	10 February 2022

==== Most points scored in a season ====
(Correct as of the end of the 2025–26 season)

Most points scored in a season
Player	Points	Season
Vince Carter	2,107	1999–2000
Vince Carter	2,070	2000–01
DeMar DeRozan	2,020	2016–17
DeMar DeRozan	1,840	2017–18
DeMar DeRozan	1,830	2015–16
DeMar DeRozan	1,791	2013–14
Chris Bosh	1,746	2008–09
Pascal Siakam	1,720	2022–23
Chris Bosh	1,678	2009–10
**Brandon Ingram**	1,655	2025–26

==== Highest points per game all-time (minimum 100 games played) ====
(Correct as of the end of the 2025–26 season)

Highest points per game all-time
Player	Points
Vince Carter	23.4
**RJ Barrett**	20.5
Chris Bosh	20.2
DeMar DeRozan	19.7
Damon Stoudamire	19.6
Kyle Lowry	17.5
**Scottie Barnes**	17.4
Pascal Siakam	17.4
**Immanuel Quickley**	17.2
Gary Trent Jr.	16.4

==== Highest points per game in a season (minimum 58 games played) ====
(Correct as of the end of the 2025–26 season)

Highest points per game in a season
Player	Points	Season
Vince Carter	27.6	2000–01
DeMar DeRozan	27.3	2016–17
Kawhi Leonard	26.6	2018–19
Vince Carter	25.7	1999–2000
Pascal Siakam	24.2	2022–23
Vince Carter	24.7	2001–02
Chris Bosh	24.0	2009–10
DeMar DeRozan	23.5	2015–16
DeMar DeRozan	23.0	2017–18
Pascal Siakam	22.9	2019–20

==== Most number of consecutive games with at least 30 points ====
(Correct as of the end of the 2025–26 season)

Most consecutive ≥30 point games
Player	Date
5 Games
DeMar DeRozan	October–November, 2016
Gary Trent Jr.	January–February 2022
4 Games
Mike James	April 2006
DeMar DeRozan	December 2016
Kyle Lowry	January 2017
Kawhi Leonard	January 2019

==== Most points scored by a bench player ====
(Correct as of the end of the 2025–26 season)

Most points scored by a bench player
Player	Points
Chris Boucher	3,256
Terrence Ross	1,925
Patrick Patterson	1,918
Norman Powell	1,578
José Calderón	1,480
Morris Peterson	1,461
Tracy McGrady	1,345
Leandro Barbosa	1,281
Joey Graham	1,258
Lou Williams	1,242

=== Rebounds ===
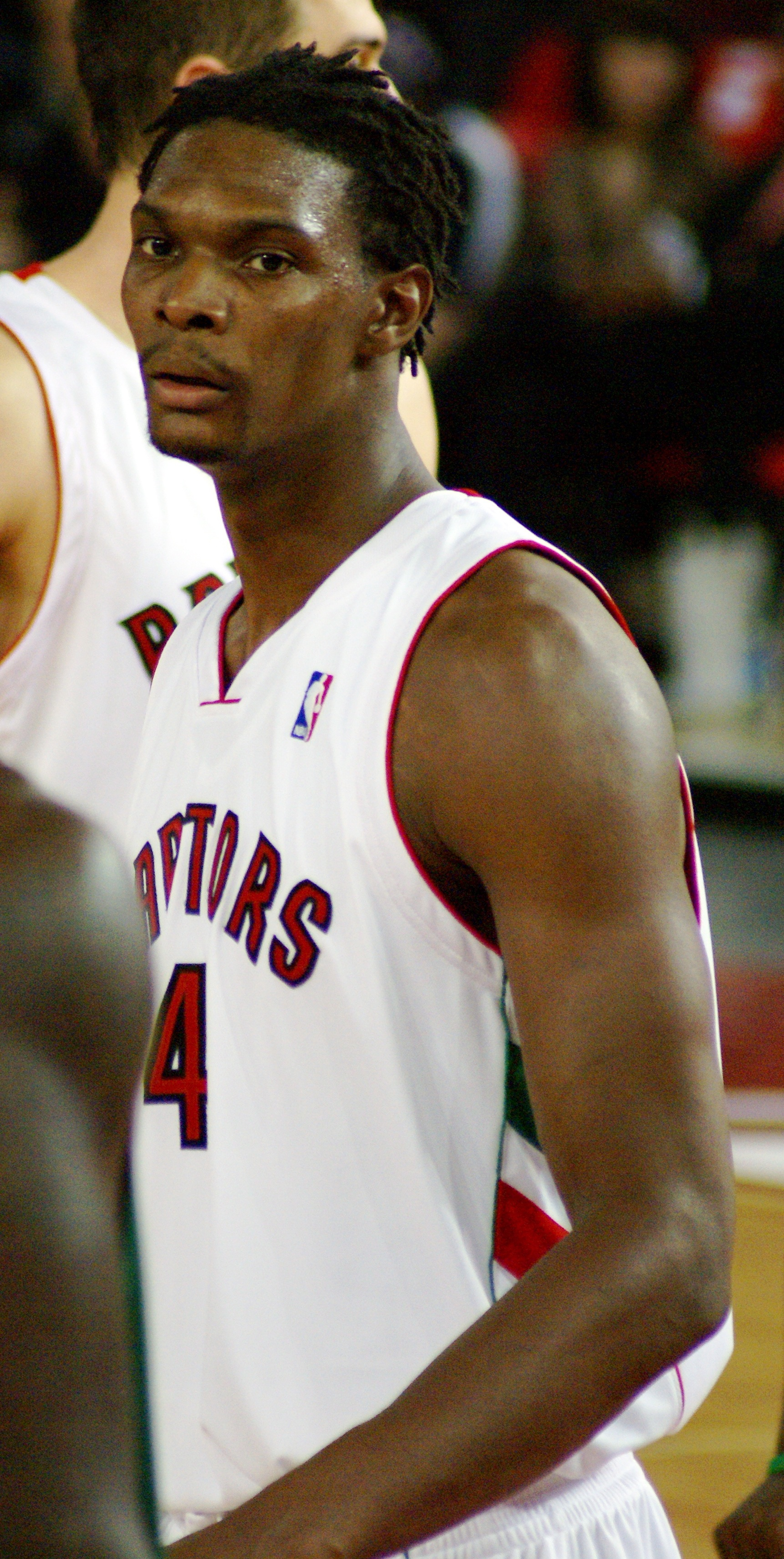
Chris Bosh is a former face of the Raptors franchise and holds most of its rebounding records.

==== Most rebounds all-time ====
(Correct as of the end of the 2025–26 season)

Most rebounds all-time
Player	Rebounds
Chris Bosh	4,776
Jonas Valančiūnas	3,961
Pascal Siakam	3,324
Kyle Lowry	2,954
Antonio Davis	2,839
Amir Johnson	2,836
DeMar DeRozan	2,739
**Scottie Barnes**	2,665
Andrea Bargnani	2,095
**Jakob Pöltl**	2,094
Vince Carter	2,091
Chris Boucher	2,083
Morris Peterson	2,064
Serge Ibaka	1,687
Charles Oakley	1,655
OG Anunoby	1,684
Doug Christie	1,448
Fred VanVleet	1,385
José Calderón	1,315
Patrick Patterson	1,311
Jerome Williams	1,268
Ed Davis	1,200
Donyell Marshall	1,137
Alvin Williams	1,079
Kevin Willis	1,055

==== Most defensive rebounds all-time ====
(Correct as of the end of the 2025–26 season)

Most defensive rebounds all-time
Player	Rebounds
Chris Bosh	3,407
Jonas Valančiūnas	2,752
Pascal Siakam	2,585
Kyle Lowry	2,479
DeMar DeRozan	2,225
**Scottie Barnes**	1,892
Antonio Davis	1,882
Amir Johnson	1,786
Andrea Bargnani	1,694
Morris Peterson	1,561
Chris Boucher	1,375
Vince Carter	1,351
**Jakob Pöltl**	1,318
Serge Ibaka	1,310
Charles Oakley	1,300
OG Anunoby	1,255
Fred VanVleet	1,211
José Calderón	1,128
Doug Christie	1,121
Patrick Patterson	962
Donyell Marshall	860
Alvin Williams	847
Ed Davis	803
Jerome Williams	802
Terrence Ross	800

==== Most offensive rebounds all-time ====
(Correct as of the end of the 2025–26 season)

Most offensive rebounds all-time
Player	Rebounds
Chris Bosh	1,369
Jonas Valančiūnas	1,209
Amir Johnson	1,050
Antonio Davis	957
**Jakob Pöltl**	776
**Scottie Barnes**	773
Vince Carter	740
Pascal Siakam	739
Chris Boucher	708
DeMar DeRozan	514
Morris Peterson	503
Kyle Lowry	475
Jerome Williams	466
OG Anunoby	429
Tracy McGrady	413
Andrea Bargnani	401
Ed Davis	397
Kevin Willis	378
Serge Ibaka	377
Charles Oakley	355
Patrick Patterson	349
Oliver Miller	346
Marcus Camby	334
Doug Christie	327
Popeye Jones	320

==== Most rebounds in a game ====
(Correct as of the end of the 2025–26 season)

Most rebounds in a game
Player	Opponent	Date
25 rebounds
Bismack Biyombo	Indiana Pacers	17 March 2016
**Scottie Barnes**	Golden State Warriors	28 December 2025
24 rebounds
Donyell Marshall	Chicago Bulls	17 February 2004
23 rebounds
Jonas Valančiūnas	Boston Celtics	10 January 2017
22 rebounds
Chris Bosh	Philadelphia 76ers	25 March 2005
Chris Bosh	Golden State Warriors	14 November 2006
Reggie Evans	Philadelphia 76ers	24 November 2010
Precious Achiuwa	Miami Heat	24 October 2022
21 rebounds
Popeye Jones	Boston Celtics	11 December 1996
Amir Johnson	Charlotte Bobcats	15 March 2013
Jonas Valančiūnas	New York Knicks	11 April 2014
20 rebounds
Hakeem Olajuwon	Detroit Pistons	20 November 2001
Jerome Williams	Washington Wizards	14 January 2003
Joey Dorsey	Milwaukee Bucks	20 November 2011
Bismack Biyombo	Dallas Mavericks	22 December 2015

==== Most rebounds in a half ====
Correct as of the end of the 2025–26 season

Most rebounds in a half
Player	Rebounds	Half	Opponent	Date
Serge Ibaka	14	2H	Indiana Pacers	23 February 2020

==== Most rebounds in quarter ====
Correct as of the end of the 2025–26 season

Most rebounds in a quarter
Player	Rebounds	Quarter	Opponent	Date
Jonas Valančiūnas	13	3rd	Indiana Pacers	31 March 2017

==== Most rebounds in a season ====
(Correct as of the end of the 2025–26 season)

Most rebounds in a season
Player	Rebounds	Season
Antonio Davis	787	2000–01
Chris Bosh	771	2008–09
Chris Bosh	759	2009–10
Jonas Valančiūnas	759	2016–17
Charles Oakley	741	2000–01
Chris Bosh	741	2006–07
Antonio Davis	740	2001–02
Chris Bosh	718	2004–05
Jonas Valančiūnas	714	2013–14
Donyell Marshall	709	2003–04

==== Highest rebounds per game all-time (minimum 100 games played) ====
(Correct as of the end of the 2025–26 season)

Highest rebounds per game all-time
Player	Rebounds
Chris Bosh	9.4
Antonio Davis	9.2
Donyell Marshall	8.7
Jonas Valančiūnas	8.4
Charles Oakley	8.0
**Scottie Barnes**	7.5
Serge Ibaka	7.4
Jerome Williams	7.0
Marcus Camby	6.8
Ed Davis	6.8

==== Highest rebounds per game in a season (minimum 58 games played) ====
(Correct as of 11 April 2022)

Highest rebounds per game in a season
Player	Rebounds	Season
Chris Bosh	10.8	2009–10
Donyell Marshall	10.7	2003–04
Chris Bosh	10.7	2003–04
Antonio Davis	10.1	2000–01
Chris Bosh	10.0	2008–09
Antonio Davis	9.6	2001–02
Charles Oakley	9.5	2000–01
Jonas Valančiūnas	9.5	2016–17
Chris Bosh	9.2	2005–06
Jerome Williams	9.2	2002–03

=== Assists ===
==== Most assists all-time ====
(Correct as of the end of the 2025–26 season)

Most assists all-time
Player	Assists
Kyle Lowry	4,277
José Calderón	3,770
Fred VanVleet	2,199
DeMar DeRozan	2,078
Pascal Siakam	1,846
**Scottie Barnes**	1,842
Alvin Williams	1,791
Damon Stoudamire	1,761
Vince Carter	1,553
Doug Christie	1,197
Chris Bosh	1,115
Morris Peterson	965
T. J. Ford	908
**Immanuel Quickley**	863
**Jamal Shead**	760
Rafer Alston	706
Charles Oakley	685
**RJ Barrett**	633
OG Anunoby	632
Anthony Parker	605

==== Most assists in a game ====
(Correct as of the end of the 2025–26 season)

Most assists in a game
Player	Opponent	Date
20 assists
Fred VanVleet	Charlotte Hornets	2 April 2023
19 assists
Damon Stoudamire	Houston Rockets	27 February 1996
José Calderón	Chicago Bulls	29 March 2009
José Calderón	Minnesota Timberwolves	4 February 2011
Kyle Lowry	Boston Celtics	4 March 2021
18 assists
T. J. Ford	Denver Nuggets	18 November 2006
T. J. Ford	New York Knicks	14 March 2007
José Calderón	Orlando Magic	18 November 2012
**Immanuel Quickley**	Phoenix Suns	7 March 2024
17 assists
Damon Stoudamire	Minnesota Timberwolves	21 January 1997
Damon Stoudamire	Boston Celtics	3 March 1997
Mark Jackson	Denver Nuggets	28 December 2000
José Calderón	Cleveland Cavaliers	5 January 2011
José Calderón	Chicago Bulls	23 February 2011
José Calderón	Washington Wizards	3 February 2012
José Calderón	Utah Jazz	12 November 2012
José Calderón	Detroit Pistons	19 December 2012
Kyle Lowry	Atlanta Hawks	21 November 2018
Fred VanVleet	Chicago Bulls	25 October 2021
16 assists
Damon Stoudamire	Denver Nuggets	18 March 1996
Damon Stoudamire	Detroit Pistons	2 January 1998
Mark Jackson	Cleveland Cavaliers	13 February 2001
Rod Strickland	Indiana Pacers	9 March 2004
José Calderón	Indiana Pacers	14 December 2007
José Calderón	Seattle SuperSonics	21 December 2007
José Calderón	Golden State Warriors	29 December 2008
José Calderón	Houston Rockets	3 March 2009
José Calderón	New Orleans Hornets	1 March 2011
José Calderón	Miami Heat	30 March 2012

==== Most assists in a season ====
(Correct as of the end of the 2025–26 season)

Most assists in a season
Player	Assists	Season
Damon Stoudamire	709	1996–97
José Calderón	678	2007–08
Damon Stoudamire	653	1995–96
José Calderón	607	2008–09
José Calderón	605	2010–11
T. J. Ford	595	2006–07
Kyle Lowry	586	2013–14
Kyle Lowry	564	2018–19
Kyle Lowry	537	2017–18
Rafer Alston	514	2004–05

==== Highest assists per game all-time (minimum 100 games played) ====
(Correct as of the 2025–26 season)

Highest assists per game all-time
Player	Assists
Damon Stoudamire	8.8
T. J. Ford	7.2
José Calderón	7.2
Kyle Lowry	7.1
**Immanuel Quickley**	6.1
Rafer Alston	5.6
Fred VanVleet	5.3
**Scottie Barnes**	5.2
**Jamal Shead**	4.8
**RJ Barrett**	4.3

==== Highest assists per game in a season (minimum 58 games played) ====
(Correct as of the 2025–26 season)

Highest assists per game in a season
Player	Assists	Season
Damon Stoudamire	9.3	1995–96
Mark Jackson	9.2	2000–01
José Calderón	8.93	2008–09
José Calderón	8.9	2010–11
José Calderón	8.83	2011–12
Damon Stoudamire	8.75	1996–97
Kyle Lowry	8.7	2018–19
José Calderón	8.3	2007–08
T. J. Ford	7.9	2006–07
Kyle Lowry	7.5	2019–20

=== Blocks ===
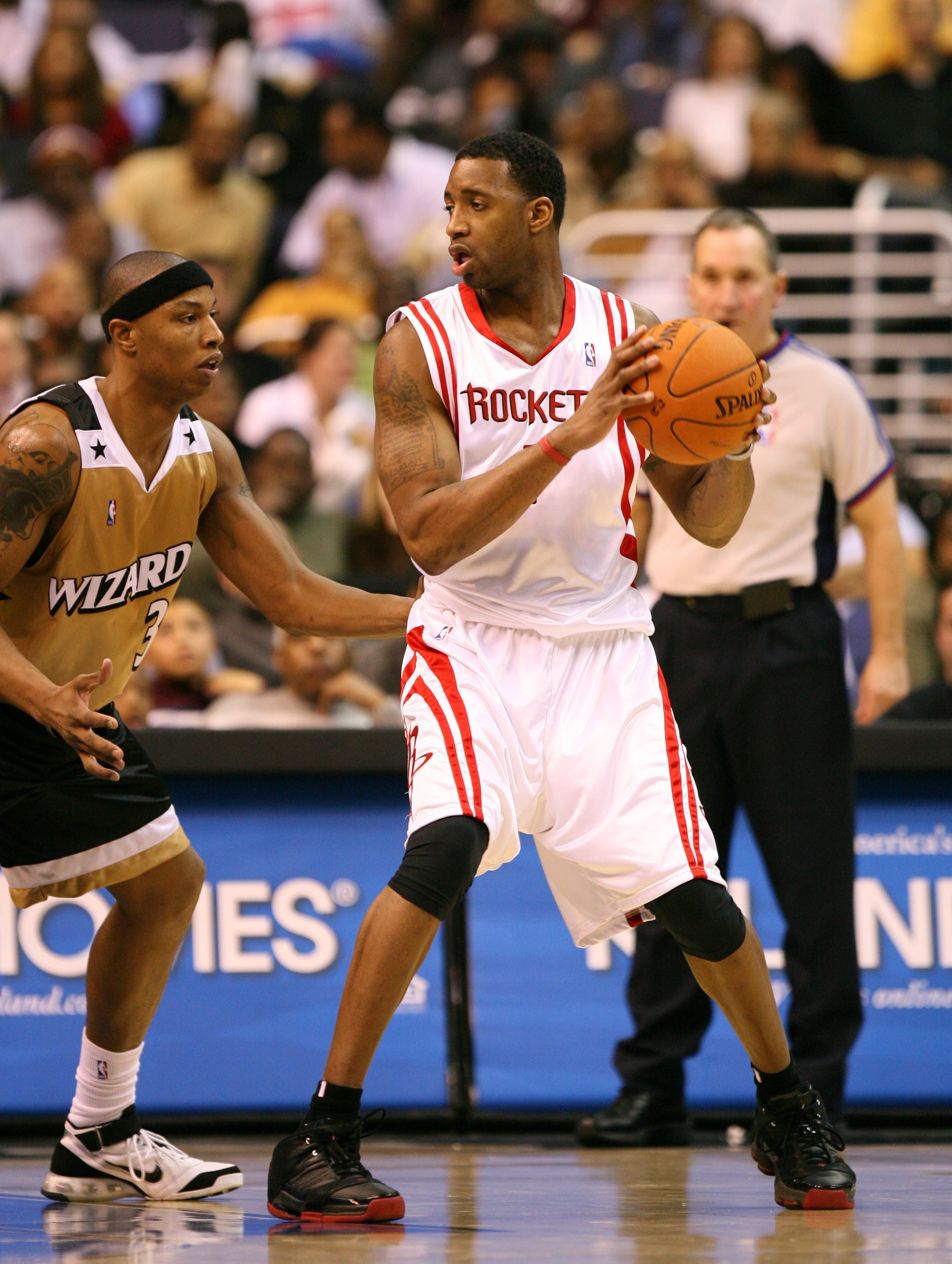
Tracy McGrady was one of the premier shot-blockers for Toronto.

==== Most blocks all-time ====
(Correct as of the end of the 2025–26 season)

Most blocks all-time
Player	Blocks
Chris Bosh	600
Amir Johnson	480
Jonas Valančiūnas	479
Vince Carter	415
Antonio Davis	405
Chris Boucher	384
**Scottie Barnes**	383
Andrea Bargnani	382
Marcus Camby	360
**Jakob Pöltl**	333
Pascal Siakam	317
Serge Ibaka	281
Tracy McGrady	278
Keon Clark	232
Oliver Miller	228
James Johnson	215
OG Anunoby	201
Kyle Lowry	195
Doug Christie	187
DeMar DeRozan	185

==== Most blocks in a game ====
(Correct as of the end of the 2025–26 season)

Most blocks in a game
12 blocks
Player	Opponent	Date
Keon Clark	Atlanta Hawks	23 March 2001
11 blocks
Marcus Camby	New Jersey Nets	14 April 1998
10 blocks
Marcus Camby	Philadelphia 76ers	19 April 1998
9 blocks
Oliver Miller	Los Angeles Clippers	2 April 1996
Marcus Camby	Phoenix Suns	1 February 1997
Hakeem Olajuwon	San Antonio Spurs	12 December 2001
Jermaine O'Neal	Los Angeles Lakers	4 February 2009
8 blocks
Marcus Camby	Charlotte Hornets	9 December 1997
Marcus Camby	Milwaukee Bucks	19 December 1997
Marcus Camby	New Jersey Nets	12 April 1998
Mamadou N'Diaye	Chicago Bulls	4 November 2002

==== Most blocks in a season ====
(Correct as of the end of the 2025–26 season)

Most blocks in a season
Player	Blocks	Season
Marcus Camby	230	1997–98
Tracy McGrady	151	1999–2000
Antonio Davis	151	2000–01
Oliver Miller	143	1995–96
Bismack Biyombo	133	2015–16
Marcus Camby	130	1996–97
Keon Clark	122	2001–02
**Scottie Barnes**	116	2025–26
Chris Bosh	113	2004–05
Andrea Bargnani	111	2009–10
Chris Boucher	111	2020–21

==== Highest blocks per game all-time (minimum 100 games played) ====
(Correct as of the end of the 2025–26 season)

Highest blocks per game all-time
Player	Blocks
Marcus Camby	2.9
Keon Clark	1.8
Tracy McGrady	1.4
Oliver Miller	1.4
Chris Boucher	1.3
Antonio Davis	1.3
Serge Ibaka	1.2
Chris Bosh	1.2
Jamario Moon	1.2
Donyell Marshall	1.1

==== Highest blocks per game in a season (minimum 58 games played) ====
(Correct as of 16 May 2021)

Highest blocks per game in a season
Player	Blocks	Season
Marcus Camby	3.7	1997–98
Keon Clark	2.4	2000–01
Marcus Camby	2.1	1996–97
Antonio Davis	1.94	2000–01
Tracy McGrady	1.91	1999–2000
Oliver Miller	1.88	1995–96
Chris Boucher	1.85	2020–21
Bismack Biyombo	1.62	2015–16
Donyell Marshall	1.58	2003–04
Vince Carter	1.5	1998–99

=== Steals ===
==== Most steals all-time ====
(Correct as of the end of the 2025–26 season)

Most steals all-time
Player	Steals
Kyle Lowry	873
Doug Christie	664
DeMar DeRozan	655
Fred VanVleet	562
Morris Peterson	552
Vince Carter	534
Alvin Williams	517
OG Anunoby	487
José Calderón	469
Pascal Siakam	468
**Scottie Barnes**	445
Chris Bosh	397
Gary Trent Jr.	322
Amir Johnson	311
Damon Stoudamire	301
Terrence Ross	267
Norman Powell	264
Anthony Parker	252
Jerome Williams	231
**Jakob Pöltl**	227

==== Most steals in a game ====
(Correct as of the end of the 2025–26 season)

Most steals in a game
Player	Opponent	Date
9 steals
Doug Christie	Denver Nuggets	25 February 1997
8 steals
Doug Christie	Philadelphia 76ers	29 January 1997
Doug Christie	Philadelphia 76ers	2 April 1997
Doug Christie	Atlanta Hawks	4 March 1999
Jerome Williams	Chicago Bulls	26 February 2003
Morris Peterson	Charlotte Hornets	10 February 2006
7 steals
Alvin Robertson	New Jersey Nets	23 January 1996
Doug Christie	Los Angeles Clippers	28 February 1997
Doug Christie	Los Angeles Clippers	14 January 1998
Doug Christie	Portland Trail Blazers	14 January 1998
Chris Bosh	Chicago Bulls	23 January 2009
Fred VanVleet	Orlando Magic	29 November 2019
OG Anunoby	Denver Nuggets	1 March 2020

==== Most steals in a season ====
(Correct as of the end of the 2025–26 season)

Most steals in a season
Player	Steals	Season
Doug Christie	201	1996–97
Doug Christie	190	1997–98
Alvin Robertson	166	1995–96
Kyle Lowry	158	2015–16
Alvin Williams	135	2001–02
OG Anunoby	128	2022–23
Damon Stoudamire	123	1996–97
Alvin Williams	123	2000–01
Fred VanVleet	123	2022–23
Gary Trent Jr.	122	2021–22

==== Highest steals per game all-time ====
(Correct as of the end of the 2025–26 season)

Highest steals per game all-time
Player	Steals
Doug Christie	2.11
Damon Stoudamire	1.51
Kyle Lowry	1.45
Walt Williams	1.4
Fred VanVleet	1.35
Vince Carter	1.33
Jerome Williams	1.28
**Scottie Barnes**	1.25
Alvin Williams	1.24
OG Anunoby	1.23

==== Highest steals per game in a season (minimum 58 games played) ====
(Correct as of 10 April 2023)

Highest steals per game in a season
Player	Steals	Season
Doug Christie	2.5	1996–97
Doug Christie	2.4	1997–98
Doug Christie	2.3	1998–99
Alvin Robertson	2.2	1995–96
Kyle Lowry	2.1	2015–16
OG Anunoby	1.91	2022–23
Fred VanVleet	1.85	2019–20
Fred VanVleet	1.78	2022–23
Kawhi Leonard	1.77	2018–19
Gary Trent Jr.	1.74	2021–22

=== Field goals ===
==== Most field goals made all-time ====
(Correct as of the end of the 2025–26 season)

Most FGs made all-time
Player	FGs
DeMar DeRozan	4,716
Chris Bosh	3,614
Vince Carter	3,541
Kyle Lowry	3,376
Pascal Siakam	3,363
Andrea Bargnani	2,419
**Scottie Barnes**	2,412
Morris Peterson	2,341
Jonas Valančiūnas	2,169
Fred VanVleet	2,053
José Calderón	2,023
OG Anunoby	1,768
Amir Johnson	1,663
Alvin Williams	1,555
Doug Christie	1,532
Antonio Davis	1,419
Damon Stoudamire	1,399
Gary Trent Jr.	1,319
Serge Ibaka	1,314
**Jakob Pöltl**	1,298

==== Most field goals made in a game ====
(Correct as of the end of the 2025–26 season)

Most FGs made in a game
Player	Opponent	Date
20 field goals
Vince Carter	Milwaukee Bucks	14 January 2000
Charlie Villanueva	Milwaukee Bucks	26 March 2006
18 field goals
Vince Carter	Houston Rockets	5 March 2002
Vince Carter	Atlanta Hawks	26 November 2003
17 field goals
Vince Carter	Phoenix Suns	27 February 2000
Vince Carter	Indiana Pacers	20 December 2000
DeMar DeRozan	Detroit Pistons	26 October 2016
DeMar DeRozan	Chicago Bulls	21 March 2017
DeMar DeRozan	Milwaukee Bucks	1 January 2018
DeMar DeRozan	Golden State Warriors	13 January 2018
Pascal Siakam	New Orleans Pelicans	8 November 2019
Fred VanVleet	Orlando Magic	2 February 2021
Gary Trent Jr.	Cleveland Cavaliers	10 April 2021
Pascal Siakam	Washington Wizards	6 May 2021
Pascal Siakam	Boston Celtics	28 March 2022
Pascal Siakam	New York Knicks	21 December 2022

==== Most field goals made in a season ====
(Correct as of the end of the 2025–26 season)

Most FGs made in a season
Player	FGs	Season
Vince Carter	788	1999–2000
Vince Carter	762	2000–01
DeMar DeRozan	721	2016–17
DeMar DeRozan	645	2017–18
Pascal Siakam	630	2022–23
Chris Bosh	615	2008–09
DeMar DeRozan	614	2015–16
**Brandon Ingram**	614	2025–26
Vince Carter	608	2003–04
DeMar DeRozan	604	2013–14

==== Most field goals attempted all-time ====
(Correct as of the end of the 2025–26 season)

Most FGs attempted all-time
Player	Attempts
DeMar DeRozan	10,532
Vince Carter	7,944
Kyle Lowry	7,944
Chris Bosh	7,346
Pascal Siakam	6,856
Morris Peterson	5,562
Andrea Bargnani	5,534
Fred VanVleet	5,108
**Scottie Barnes**	5,076
José Calderón	4,207
Jonas Valančiūnas	3,878
OG Anunoby	3,738
Alvin Williams	3,710
Doug Christie	3,698
Damon Stoudamire	3,369
Antonio Davis	3,333
Gary Trent Jr.	3,129
Terrence Ross	3,066
Amir Johnson	2,906
Norman Powell	2,673

==== Most field goals attempted in a game ====
(Correct as of the end of the 2025–26 season)

Most FGs attempted in a game
Player	Opponent	Date
38 attempts
DeMar DeRozan	Chicago Bulls	21 March 2017
37 attempts
Damon Stoudamire	Boston Celtics	11 December 1996
Rudy Gay	Houston Rockets	11 November 2013
36 attempts
Vince Carter	Philadelphia 76ers	21 January 2001
34 attempts
Vince Carter	Phoenix Suns	10 December 2000
33 attempts
DeMar DeRozan	Utah Jazz	12 November 2012

==== Most field goals attempted in a season ====
(Correct as of the end of the 2025–26 season)

Most FGs attempted in a season
Player	Attempts	Season
Vince Carter	1,696	1999–2000
Vince Carter	1,656	2000–01
DeMar DeRozan	1,545	2016–17
Vince Carter	1,457	2003–04
DeMar DeRozan	1,413	2017–18
Damon Stoudamire	1,407	1996–97
DeMar DeRozan	1,407	2013–14
DeMar DeRozan	1,377	2015–16
Pascal Siakam	1,313	2022–23
Vince Carter	1,307	2001–02

==== Highest field goal percentage all-time (minimum 500 makes) ====
(Correct as of the end of the 2025–26 season)

1. **Jakob Pöltl** – 65.0%
2. Amir Johnson – 57.2%
3. Jonas Valančiūnas – 55.9%
4. Rasho Nesterović – 54.8%
5. Ed Davis – 54.7%
6. Oliver Miller – 50.9%
7. Serge Ibaka – 50.3%
8. Keon Clark – 49.9%
9. James Johnson – 49.8%
10. Jerome Williams – 49.7%

==== Highest field goal percentage in a season (minimum 300 makes) ====
Source: (Note: The minimum field goal makes required for the 1998–99 season (183) and the 2011–12 season (241) were modified to account for their respective lockout-shortened seasons.)

(Correct as of the end of the 2025–26 season)

1. **Jakob Pöltl** – 62.7% (2024–25 season)
2. Jonas Valančiūnas – 57.2% (2014–15 season)
3. Jonas Valančiūnas – 56.8% (2017–18 season)
4. Jonas Valančiūnas – 56.5% (2015–16 season)
5. Amir Johnson – 56.2% (2013–14 season)
6. Jonas Valančiūnas – 55.7% (2016–17 season)
7. Amir Johnson – 55.4% (2012–13 season)
8. Pascal Siakam – 54.9% (2018–19 season)
9. Jonas Valančiūnas – 53.1% (2013–14 season)
10. Serge Ibaka – 52.9% (2018–19 season)

=== Three-point field goals ===
==== Most three-point field goals made all-time ====
(Correct as of the end of the 2025–26 season)

Most 3-pt FGs made all-time
Player	3-pt FGs
Kyle Lowry	1,518
Fred VanVleet	1,000
Morris Peterson	801
OG Anunoby	651
Terrence Ross	598
Gary Trent Jr.	597
Andrea Bargnani	579
Vince Carter	554
Pascal Siakam	527
José Calderón	456
Norman Powell	440
Doug Christie	431
Damon Stoudamire	374
Chris Boucher	371
**Immanuel Quickley**	370
**Scottie Barnes**	366
Patrick Patterson	351
Anthony Parker	342
DeMar DeRozan	325
Donyell Marshall	271

==== Most three-point field goals made in a game ====
(Correct as of the end of the 2025–26 season)

Most 3-pt FGs made in a game
Player	3-pt FGs	Date	Opponent
Donyell Marshall	12	13 March 2005	Philadelphia 76ers
Fred VanVleet	11	2 February 2021	Orlando Magic
Terrence Ross	10	25 January 2014	Los Angeles Clippers
Dee Brown	9	28 April 1999	Milwaukee Bucks
Gary Trent Jr.	9	31 January 2022	Atlanta Hawks

==== Most three-point field goals in a half ====
(Correct as of the end of the 2025–26 season)

1. Fred VanVleet – 8, vs. Orlando Magic, 2 February 2021
2. Terrence Ross – 7, vs. Los Angeles Clippers, 26 January 2014; Danny Green – 7, vs. Memphis Grizzlies, 19 January 2019

==== Most three-point field goals in a quarter ====
(Correct as of the end of the 2025–26 season)

1. Danny Green – 7, vs. Memphis Grizzlies (3rd quarter) 19 January 2019

==== Most three-point field goals made in a season ====
(Correct as of the end of the 2025–26 season)

Most 3-pt FGs made in a season
Player	3-pt FGs	Season
Fred VanVleet	242	2021–22
Kyle Lowry	238	2017–18
Kyle Lowry	212	2015–16
Gary Trent Jr.	209	2021–22
Fred VanVleet	207	2022–23
Danny Green	198	2018–19
Kyle Lowry	193	2016–17
Kyle Lowry	190	2013–14
Gary Trent Jr.	178	2023–24
**Immanuel Quickley**	178	2025–26
Morris Peterson	177	2005–06
Damon Stoudamire	176	1995–96
Walt Williams	175	1996–97
Fred VanVleet	174	2020–21
Mike James	169	2005–06
Gary Trent Jr.	166	2022–23
C. J. Miles	164	2017–18
Kyle Lowry	164	2019–20
Vince Carter	162	2000–01
Terrence Ross	161	2013–14

==== Most three-point field goals attempted all-time ====
(Correct as of 21 April 2025)

Most 3-pt FGs attempted all-time
Player	Attempts
Kyle Lowry	4,031
Fred VanVleet	2,684
Morris Peterson	2,158
OG Anunoby	1,735
Pascal Siakam	1,614
Andrea Bargnani	1,606
Terrence Ross	1,589
Gary Trent Jr.	1,572
Vince Carter	1,445
Doug Christie	1,213
José Calderón	1,174
Norman Powell	1,160
DeMar DeRozan	1,128
Chris Boucher	1,095
Damon Stoudamire	1,038
**Scottie Barnes**	993
Patrick Patterson	941
Anthony Parker	806
Serge Ibaka	751
Dee Brown	694

==== Most three-point field goals attempted in a game ====
(Correct as of 24 February 2023)

1. Donyell Marshall – 19, vs. Philadelphia 76ers, 13 March 2005
2. Dee Brown – 18, vs. Milwaukee Bucks, 28 April 1999
3. Terrence Ross – 17, vs. Los Angeles Clippers, 25 January 2014; Kyle Lowry – 17, vs. Charlotte Hornets, 17 December 2015; Fred VanVleet – 17, vs. New Orleans Pelicans, 9 January 2022

==== Most three-point field goals attempted in a season ====
(Correct as of 11 April 2022)

1. Fred VanVleet – 642 (2021–22 season)
2. Kyle Lowry – 596 (2017–18 season)
3. Kyle Lowry – 547 (2015–16 season)
4. Gary Trent Jr. – 545 (2021–22 season)
5. Kyle Lowry – 500 (2013–14 season)
6. Damon Stoudamire – 496 (1996–97 season)
7. Fred VanVleet – 476 (2020–21 season)
8. Kyle Lowry – 468 (2016–17 season)
9. Kyle Lowry – 466 (2019–20 season)
10. C. J. Miles – 454 (2017–18 season)

==== Highest three-point percentage (minimum 50 three-point field goals made) ====
(Correct as of 26 March 2021)

1. Matt Thomas – 45.7%
2. Danny Green – 45.5%
3. Jason Kapono – 44.7%
4. Mike James – 44.2%
5. Steve Novak – 42.6%
6. Anthony Parker – 42.4%
7. Matt Bonner – 42.1%
8. Donyell Marshall – 41.0%
9. Lamond Murray – 40.6%
10. Tracy Murray – 40.6%

==== Highest three-point percentage in a season (minimum 82 makes; 55 makes between 1997–2013) ====
Note: (Note: The minimum three-point field goal makes required for the 1998–99 season (34) and the 2011–12 season (44) were modified to account for their respective lockout-shortened seasons.)

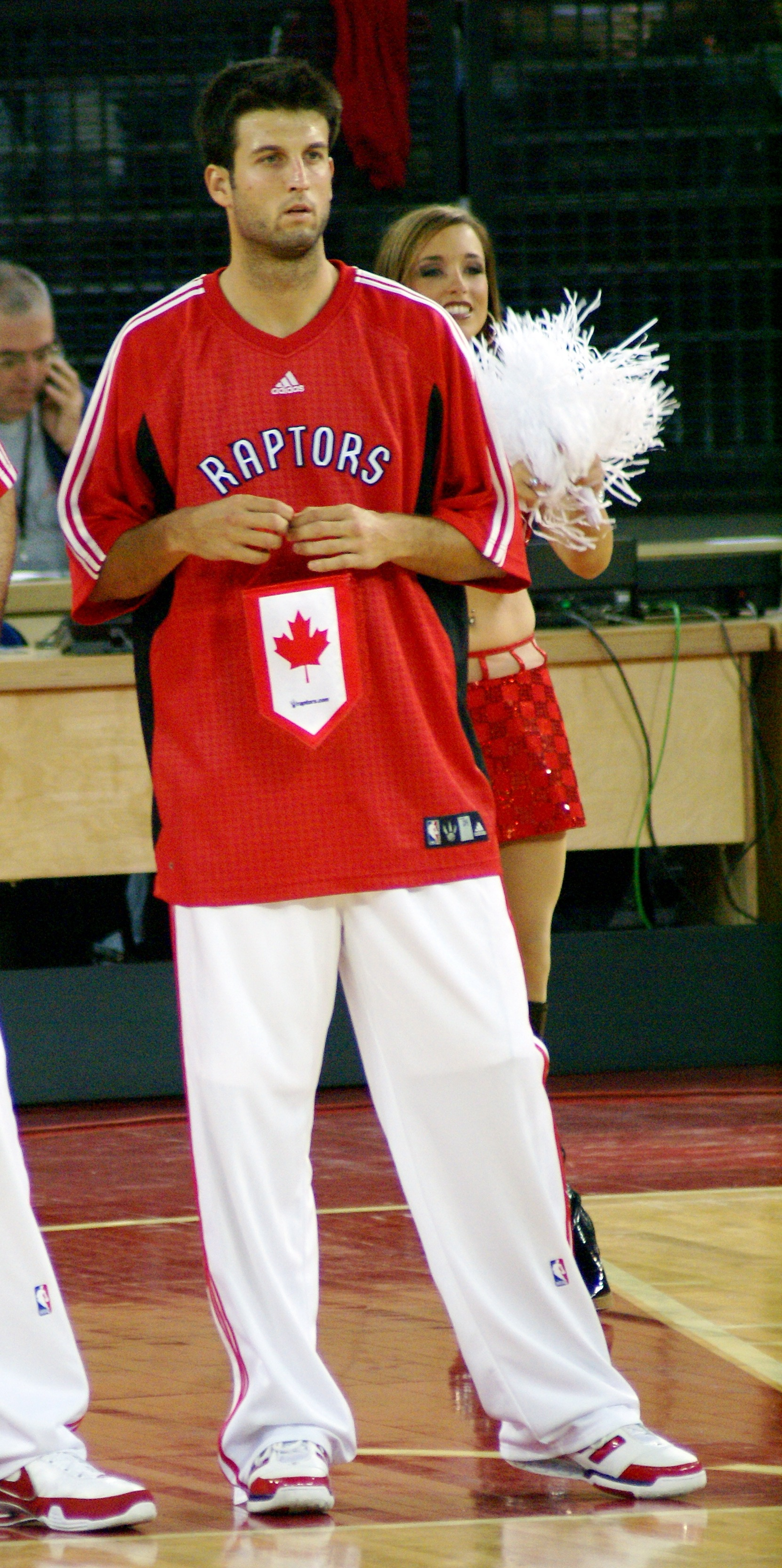
Jason Kapono holds the record for best three-point percentage in a season in franchise history

(Correct as of 26 March 2021)

1. Jason Kapono – 48.3% (2007–08 season)
2. Danny Green – 45.5% (2018–19 season)
3. Mike James – 44.2% (2005–06 season)
4. Anthony Parker – 44.1% (2006–07 season)
5. Norman Powell – 43.9% (2020–21 season)
6. Anthony Parker – 43.8% (2007–08 season)
7. José Calderón – 42.9% (2007–08 season); José Calderón – 42.9% (2012–13 season)
8. Jason Kapono – 42.79% (2008–09 season)
9. Dell Curry – 42.76% (2000–01 season)

==== Most consecutive games with at least a three-point field goal made ====
(Correct as of 16 April 2021)

Most consecutive games with ≥1 3-pt FG made
Player	Games	Date
Fred VanVleet	76	12 December 2019 – 2 April 2021
C. J. Miles	38	10 December 2017 – 15 March 2018
Damon Stoudamire	34	13 February 1996 – 26 November 1996
Kyle Lowry	34	1 November 2015 – 4 January 2016
Kyle Lowry	33	8 January 2016 – 25 March 2016

=== Free throws ===
==== Most free throws made all-time ====
(Correct as of 21 April 2025)

Most FTs made all-time
Player	FTs
DeMar DeRozan	3,539
Chris Bosh	2,997
Kyle Lowry	2,270
Vince Carter	1,784
Pascal Siakam	1,622
Andrea Bargnani	1,164
Antonio Davis	1,156
Jonas Valančiūnas	1,146
Morris Peterson	1,015
Fred VanVleet	984
Doug Christie	953
**Scottie Barnes**	772
Damon Stoudamire	745
José Calderón	733
Chris Boucher	673
Jalen Rose	647
Amir Johnson	585
Alvin Williams	565
Norman Powell	533
OG Anunoby	489

==== Most free throws made in a game ====
(Correct as of 15 February 2022)

Most FTs made in a game
Player	Date	Opponent
24 Free throws
DeMar DeRozan	4 March 2016	Portland Trail Blazers
22 Free throws
Vince Carter	30 December 2000	Phoenix Suns
Chris Bosh	22 December 2007	Phoenix Suns
20 Free throws
Chris Bosh	4 April 2010	Golden State Warriors
18 Free throws
Mike James	14 April 2006	Detroit Pistons

==== Most free throws made in a season ====
(Correct as of 23 April 2021)

Most FTs made in a season
Player	FTs	Season
DeMar DeRozan	555	2015–16 season
DeMar DeRozan	545	2016–17 season
DeMar DeRozan	519	2013–14 season
Chris Bosh	504	2008–09 season
Chris Bosh	474	2005–06 season
Chris Bosh	472	2007–08 season
Chris Bosh	470	2009–10 season
Chris Bosh	463	2006–07 season
Chris Bosh	461	2017–18 season
Vince Carter	436	1999–2000 season

==== Most free throws attempted all-time ====
(Correct as of 21 April 2025)

Most FTs attempted all-time
Player	Attempts
DeMar DeRozan	4,277
Chris Bosh	3,767
Kyle Lowry	2,750
Vince Carter	2,277
Pascal Siakam	2,101
Antonio Davis	1,501
Jonas Valančiūnas	1,456
Andrea Bargnani	1,411
Morris Peterson	1,298
Doug Christie	1,166
Fred VanVleet	1,132
**Scottie Barnes**	1,014
Damon Stoudamire	909
Chris Boucher	864
Amir Johnson	852
José Calderón	836
Jalen Rose	787
Alvin Williams	739
Tracy McGrady	660
OG Anunoby	659

==== Most free throws attempted in a game ====
(Correct as of 2 February 2021)

1. Vince Carter – 27, vs. Phoenix Suns, 30 December 2000
2. DeMar DeRozan – 25, vs. Portland Trail Blazers, 4 March 2016
3. Chris Bosh – 24, vs. Phoenix Suns, 22 December 2007
4. Chris Bosh – 23, vs. Golden State Warriors, 4 April 2010
5. Chris Bosh – 20, vs. Charlotte Bobcats, 20 March 2009; vs. Detroit Pistons, 4 December 2009; vs. Indiana Pacers, 11 January 2010 DeMar DeRozan – 20, vs. Indiana Pacers, 31 March 2017

==== Most free throws attempted in a season ====
(Correct as of 13 December 2022)

Most FTs attempted in a season
Player	Attempts	Season
DeMar DeRozan	653	2015–16 season
DeMar DeRozan	647	2016–17 season
DeMar DeRozan	630	2013–14 season
Chris Bosh	617	2008–09 season
Chris Bosh	590	2006–07 season
Chris Bosh	590	2009–10 season
Chris Bosh	581	2005–06 season
Chris Bosh	559	2013–14 season
DeMar DeRozan	559	2017–18 season
Vince Carter	551	1999–2000 season

==== Highest free throw percentage all-time (minimum 200 makes) ====
(Correct as of 9 November 2023)

1. José Calderón – 87.7%
2. Fred VanVleet – 86.9%
3. Lou Williams – 86.1%
4. Kawhi Leonard – 85.45%
5. Jarrett Jack – 84.7%
6. T. J. Ford – 83.732%
7. Mike James – 83.728%
8. Norman Powell – 83.0%
9. Anthony Parker – 82.9%
10. DeMar DeRozan – 82.74%
11. Joey Graham – 82.73%

==== Highest free throw percentage in a season (minimum 125 makes) ====
Sources: (Note: The minimum free throw makes required for the 1998–99 season (76) and the 2011–12 season (100) were modified to account for their respective lockout-shortened seasons.)

(Correct as of 16 May 2021)

1. José Calderón – 98.1% (2008–09 season)
2. Fred VanVleet – 88.5% (2020–21 season)
3. Kyle Lowry – 87.5% (2020–21 season)
4. Fred VanVleet – 87.4% (2021–22 season)
5. Andrea Bargnani – 87.3% (2011–12 season)
6. Norman Powell – 86.5% (2020–21 season)
7. Lou Williams – 86.1% (2014–15 season)
8. Alan Anderson – 85.7% (2012–13 season); Kyle Lowry (2019–20) – 85.7%
9. Kawhi Leonard – 85.5% (2018–19 season)
10. Kyle Lowry – 85.44% (2017–18 season)
11. Jalen Rose – 85.38% (2004–05 season)
12. DeMar DeRozan – 85.0% (2015–16 season)
13. Fred VanVleet – 84.8% (2019–20 season)

==== Most consecutive free throws made ====
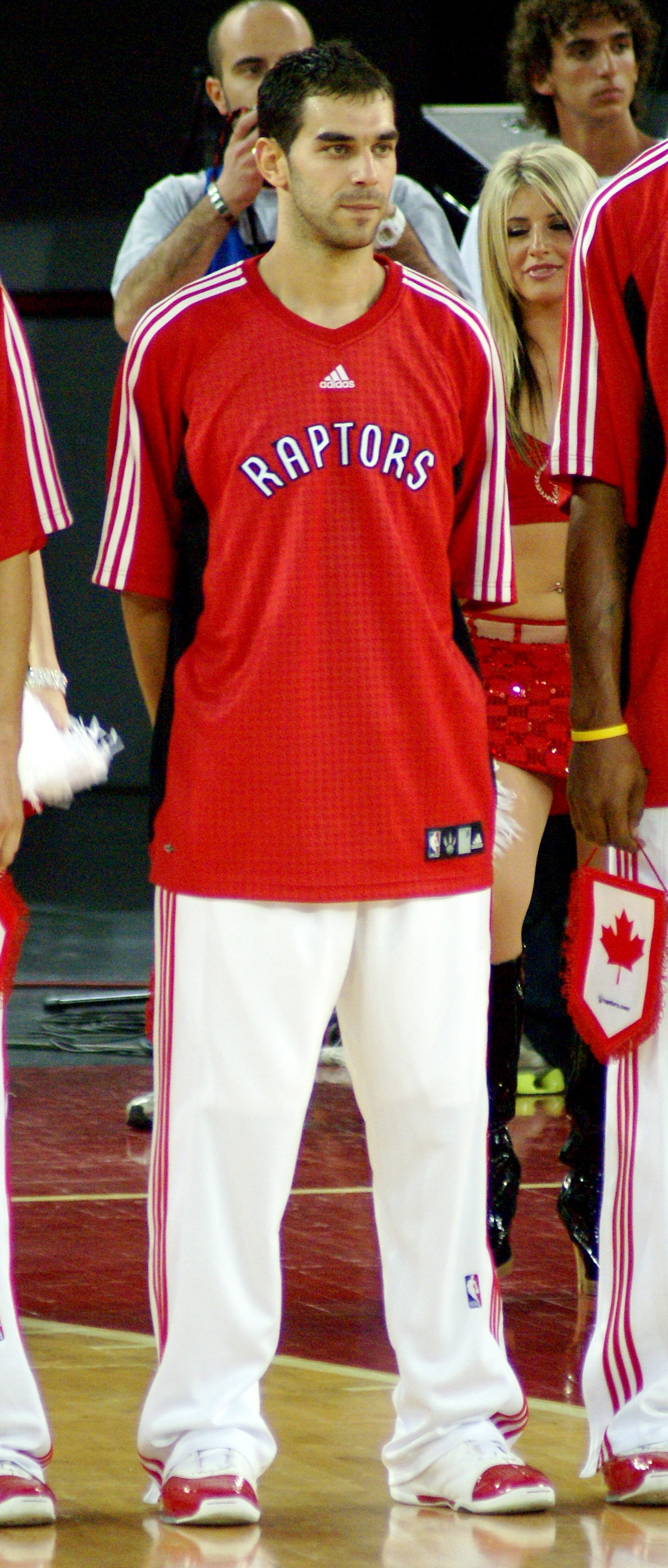
José Calderón holds the records for most consecutive free throws made and highest assist-to-turnover ratio.

(Correct as of 22 September 2020)

1. José Calderón – 87

=== Double doubles ===
==== Most double-doubles all-time ====
(Correct as of 21 April 2025)

Most double doubles all-time
Player	Double doubles
Chris Bosh	239
Jonas Valančiūnas	137
Kyle Lowry	132
Antonio Davis	110
Pascal Siakam	102
José Calderón	91
Damon Stoudamire	86
**Scottie Barnes**	79
Amir Johnson	55
**Jakob Poeltl**	55
Serge Ibaka	53
Donyell Marshall	49
Vince Carter	39
Chris Boucher	40
Fred VanVleet	34
Charles Oakley	30
Kevin Willis	29
Jerome Williams	27
Ed Davis	24
Popeye Jones	23
Marcus Camby	22
T. J. Ford	22
Andrea Bargnani	22
Oliver Miller	21

==== Most double-doubles in a season ====
(Correct as of 13 November 2022)

1. Chris Bosh – 49 (2009–10 season)
2. Chris Bosh – 43 (2008–09 season)
3. Chris Bosh – 42 (2006–07 season)
4. Antonio Davis – 37 (2000–01 season); Damon Stoudamire – 37 (1995–96 season)
5. Donyell Marshall – 36 (2003–04 season)

=== Triple-doubles ===
==== Most triple-doubles all-time ====
(Correct as of 21 April 2025)

Most triple doubles all-time
Player	Triple doubles	Dates
Kyle Lowry	16	2 March 2013; 24 January 2014; 9 March 2014; 7 November 2014; 16 March 2015; 22 February 2016; 5 February 2017; 27 October 2017; 15 December 2017; 23 March 2018; 21 November 2018; 8 March 2019; 18 December 2019; 20 December 2019; 2 February 2021; 27 February 2021
**Scottie Barnes**	6	5 November 2022; 27 October 2023; 9 December 2023; 10 February 2024; 26 February 2024; 29 November 2024
Pascal Siakam	5	11 January 2021; 30 March 2022; 7 April 2022; 21 October 2022; 2 November 2022
Damon Stoudamire	3	21 November 1995; 8 November 1996; 18 March 1997
Marcus Camby	2	14 April 1998; 19 April 1998
José Calderón	2	13 November 2012; 16 December 2012
Fred VanVleet	2	7 January 2022; 1 February 2023
Vince Carter	1	10 April 2000
Charles Oakley	1	11 November 2000
Mark Jackson	1	26 November 2000
Alvin Williams	1	23 March 2001
Ben Uzoh	1	26 April 2012
**Jonathan Mogbo**	1	9 April 2025

=== Plus/minus ===
==== Highest plus/minus in a game ====
(Correct as of 21 April 2025)

Highest +/- in a game
Player	+/-	Dates
Gary Trent Jr.	+54	2 April 2021
Pascal Siakam	+49	2 April 2021
Mark Jackson	+46	7 November 2000
OG Anunoby	+43	2 April 2021
Kyle Lowry	+42	24 March 2021
Malachi Flynn	+42	28 February 2022
Vince Carter	+40	23 March 2001
Patrick Patterson	+40	11 January 2014
Pascal Siakam	+40	19 January 2019
Vince Carter	+39	7 November 2000
Kelly Olynyk	+39	21 January 2025

==== Highest plus/minus in a season ====
(Correct as of 23 March 2022)

Highest +/- in a season
Player	+/-	Season
Danny Green	+638	2018–19 season
Pascal Siakam	+593	2018–19 season
Kyle Lowry	+536	2018–19 season
DeMar DeRozan	+440	2017–18 season
Patrick Patterson	+403	2015–16 season
Pascal Siakam	+399	2019–20 season
Kyle Lowry	+399	2017–18 season
Kyle Lowry	+380	2015–16 season
Kyle Lowry	+358	2016–17 season
Chris Bosh	+358	2007–08 season

==== Highest plus/minus all-time ====
(Correct as of 31 July 2024)

Highest +/- all-time
Player	+/-
Kyle Lowry	+2456
Pascal Siakam	+1755
Fred VanVleet	+1465
Patrick Patterson	+1203
OG Anunoby	+942
Serge Ibaka	+708
Danny Green	+638
Terrence Ross	+508
Jonas Valančiūnas	+501
Marc Gasol	+476

== Franchise records for playoffs ==
Unless otherwise stated, statistics/records are correct as of the 2022 NBA playoffs.

=== Most games played (playoffs) ===
Most playoff games played
Player	Games
Kyle Lowry	84
Norman Powell	67
Serge Ibaka	55
Pascal Siakam	53
Fred VanVleet	52
DeMar DeRozan	51
Jonas Valančiūnas	43
Patrick Patterson	41
Marc Gasol	35
Terrence Ross	31
DeMarre Carroll	30
Cory Joseph	30
Delon Wright	28
OG Anunoby	27
Danny Green	24
Kawhi Leonard	24
Antonio Davis	20
Bismack Biyombo	20
Dell Curry	19
Morris Peterson	19

=== Most minutes played (playoffs) ===
Most minutes played
Player	Minutes
Kyle Lowry	3,143
DeMar DeRozan	1,914
Pascal Siakam	1,758
Serge Ibaka	1,318
Fred VanVleet	1,305
Norman Powell	1,112
Jonas Valančiūnas	1,097
Patrick Patterson	1,073
Marc Gasol	963
Kawhi Leonard	939
OG Anunoby	848
DeMarre Carroll	751

=== Most minutes played in game (playoffs) ===
Most minutes played in a playoff game
Player	Minutes	Opponent	Date
Pascal Siakam	54	Boston Celtics	9 September 2020
Kyle Lowry	53	Boston Celtics	9 September 2020
Kawhi Leonard	52	Milwaukee Bucks	19 May 2019
Pascal Siakam	51	Milwaukee Bucks	19 May 2019
Fred VanVleet	50	Boston Celtics	9 September 2020
OG Anunoby	49	Boston Celtics	9 September 2020

=== Most points (playoffs) ===
Most playoff points scored
Player	Points
Kyle Lowry	1,435
DeMar DeRozan	1,117
Pascal Siakam	845
Kawhi Leonard	732
Serge Ibaka	618
Jonas Valančiūnas	544
Fred VanVleet	518
Norman Powell	482
Vince Carter	385
Patrick Patterson	301
OG Anunoby	298
Marc Gasol	292
Cory Joseph	249
Alvin Williams	225
Chris Bosh	225
DeMarre Carroll	219
Terrence Ross	189
Chris Childs	168
Danny Green	166

=== Most points in a game (playoffs) ===
Most points scored in a playoff game
Player	Points	Opponent	Date
50 points
Vince Carter	50	Philadelphia 76ers	11 May 2001
45 points
Kawhi Leonard	45	Philadelphia 76ers	27 April 2019
41 points
Kawhi Leonard	41	Philadelphia 76ers	12 May 2019
39 points
Vince Carter	39	Philadelphia 76ers	18 May 2001
Chris Bosh	39	Orlando Magic	26 April 2008
Kawhi Leonard	39	Philadelphia 76ers	5 May 2019
37 points
DeMar DeRozan	37	Cleveland Cavaliers	5 May 2017
DeMar DeRozan	37	Washington Wizards	17 April 2018
Kawhi Leonard	37	Orlando Magic	16 April 2019
36 points
Kawhi Leonard	36	Milwaukee Bucks	19 May 2019
Kawhi Leonard	36	Golden State Warriors	7 June 2019
Kyle Lowry	36	Brooklyn Nets	30 April 2014
Kyle Lowry	36	Miami Heat	13 May 2016

=== Most points scored in a half (playoffs) ===
Most points scored in a half of a playoff game
Player	Points	Half	Opponent	Date
Kyle Lowry	29	2nd	Miami Heat	7 May 2016
Kyle Lowry	27	2nd	Miami Heat	13 May 2016
Kawhi Leonard	27	1st	Philadelphia 76ers	27 April 2019
Kawhi Leonard	26	2nd	Philadelphia 76ers	12 May 2019
DeMar DeRozan	24	2nd	Miami Heat	11 May 2016
Kyle Lowry	23	2nd	Cleveland Cavaliers	27 May 2016
DeMar DeRozan	22	1st	Washington Wizards	24 April 2015
DeMar DeRozan	22	2nd	Cleveland Cavaliers	23 May 2016
Pascal Siakam	22	1st	Philadelphia 76ers	27 April 2019
Kawhi Leonard	22	2nd	Philadelphia 76ers	5 May 2019
Kawhi Leonard	22	2nd	Milwaukee Bucks	23 May 2019
Kawhi Leonard	22	2nd	Golden State Warriors	7 June 2019

=== Most points scored in a quarter (playoffs) ===
Most points scored in a quarter of a playoff game
Player	Points	Quarter	Opponent	Date
DeMar DeRozan	20	1st	Washington Wizards	24 April 2015
Kyle Lowry	18	3rd	Cleveland Cavaliers	27 May 2016
Cory Joseph	18	4th	Cleveland Cavaliers	3 May 2017
Kawhi Leonard	17	3rd	Orlando Magic	16 April 2019
Pascal Siakam	17	1st	Philadelphia 76ers	27 April 2019
Kawhi Leonard	17	1st	Philadelphia 76ers	27 April 2019
Kawhi Leonard	17	3rd	Golden State Warriors	7 June 2019

=== Most points scored in an overtime period (playoffs) ===
Most points scored in an overtime period of a playoff game
Player	Points	OT Period	Opponent	Date
Norman Powell	10	2OT	Boston Celtics	9 September 2020

=== Most points in a playoff run ===
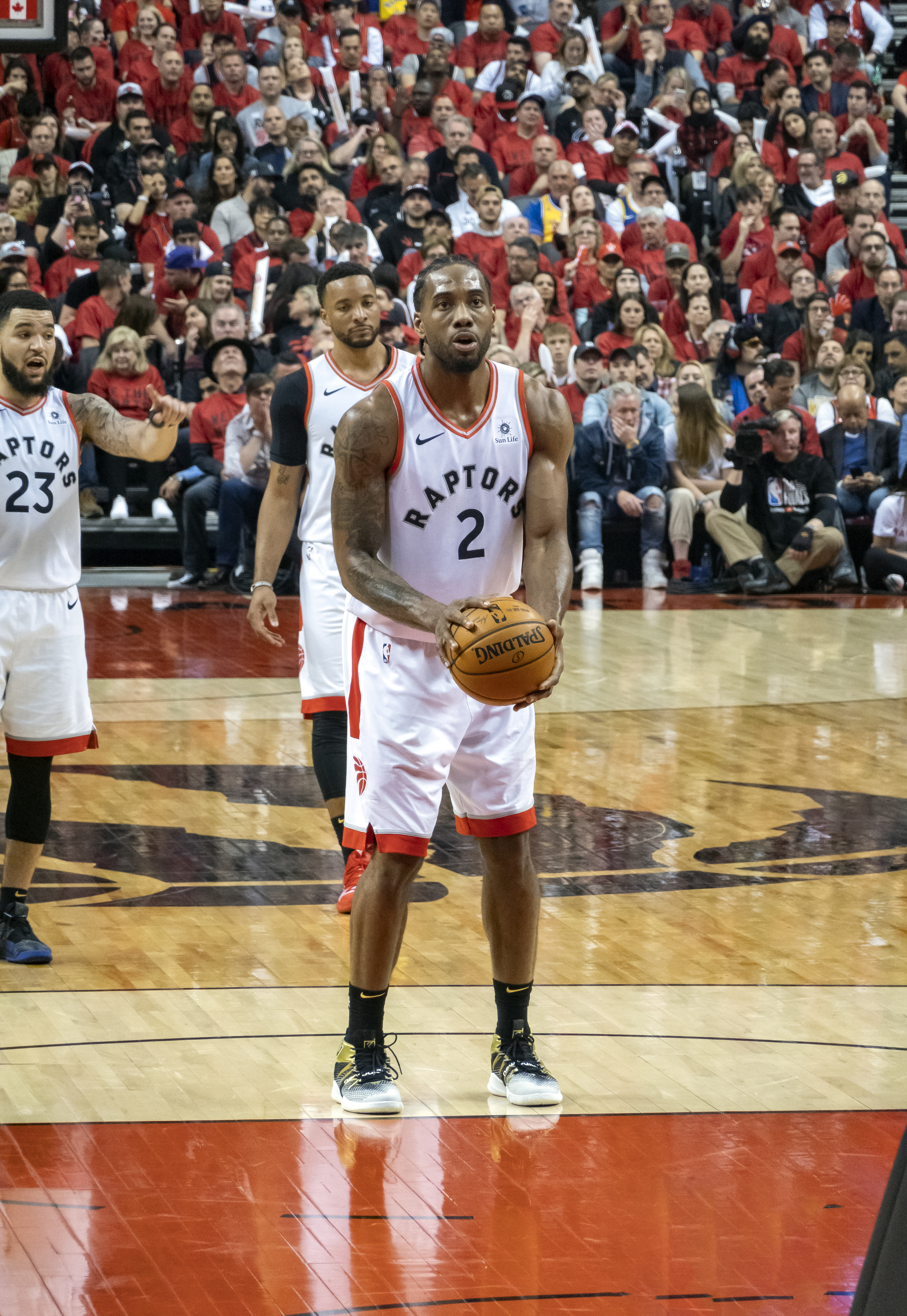
Though Kawhi Leonard only spent a season with the Raptors, his 732 points during the postseason in Toronto's NBA championship run is a franchise record.

Most playoff points scored in a playoff run
Player	Points	Playoff run
Kawhi Leonard	732	2019
Pascal Siakam	455	2019
DeMar DeRozan	418	2016
Kyle Lowry	382	2016
Kyle Lowry	361	2019
Vince Carter	327	2001
DeMar DeRozan	227	2018
Marc Gasol	226	2019
Serge Ibaka	225	2019
DeMar DeRozan	224	2017

=== Most rebounds (playoffs) ===
Most rebounds
Player	Rebounds
Jonas Valančiūnas	406
Kyle Lowry	406
Serge Ibaka	352
Pascal Siakam	336
DeMar DeRozan	222
Kawhi Leonard	218
Antonio Davis	211
Marc Gasol	202
Bismack Biyombo	187
Patrick Patterson	158
Norman Powell	134
OG Anunoby	121
Fred VanVleet	113
DeMarre Carroll	108
Charles Oakley	99
Chris Bosh	99
Vince Carter	96
Danny Green	87
Jerome Williams	78
Amir Johnson	70

=== Most rebounds in a game (playoffs) ===
Most rebounds in a playoff game
Player	Rebounds	Opponent	Date
26 rebounds
Bismack Biyombo	26	Cleveland Cavaliers	21 May 2016
19 rebounds
Jonas Valančiūnas	19	Indiana Pacers	16 April 2016
18 rebounds
Jonas Valančiūnas	18	Brooklyn Nets	19 April 2014
17 rebounds
Kawhi Leonard	17	Milwaukee Bucks	25 May 2019
16 rebounds
Keon Clark	16	Detroit Pistons	29 April 2002
Bismack Biyombo	16	Indiana Pacers	26 April 2016
Bismack Biyombo	16	Miami Heat	15 May 2016
15 rebounds
Antonio Davis	15	New York Knicks	22 April 2001
Chris Bosh	15	Orlando Magic	26 April 2008
Jonas Valančiūnas	15	Indiana Pacers	18 April 2016
Jonas Valančiūnas	15	Indiana Pacers	1 May 2016

=== Most assists (playoffs) ===
Most assists
Player	Assists
Kyle Lowry	526
Fred VanVleet	180
DeMar DeRozan	176
Pascal Siakam	152
Chris Childs	115
Marc Gasol	102
Kawhi Leonard	94
Alvin Williams	78
Cory Joseph	78
Vince Carter	75
José Calderón	67
Serge Ibaka	60
Norman Powell	59
Patrick Patterson	58
T. J. Ford	57
Greivis Vásquez	48
Delon Wright	39
OG Anunoby	35
Antonio Davis	33
Chris Bosh	33
Charles Oakley	32

=== Most assists in a game (playoffs) ===
Most assists in a playoff game
Player	Assists	Opponent	Date
14 assists
Chris Childs	14	Detroit Pistons	24 April 2002
13 assists
José Calderón	13	Orlando Magic	24 April 2008
T. J. Ford	13	Orlando Magic	26 April 2008
12 assists
Cory Joseph	12	Cleveland Cavaliers	7 May 2017
Kyle Lowry	12	Washington Wizards	17 April 2018
11 assists
Kyle Lowry	11	Cleveland Cavaliers	1 May 2017
Fred VanVleet	11	Brooklyn Nets	17 August 2020
10 assists
Chris Childs	10	Philadelphia 76ers	11 May 2001
Chris Childs	10	Detroit Pistons	27 April 2002
Kyle Lowry	10	Indiana Pacers	29 April 2016
Kyle Lowry	10	Milwaukee Bucks	24 April 2017
Kyle Lowry	10	Washington Wizards	25 April 2018
Kyle Lowry	10	Cleveland Cavaliers	1 May 2018
Kyle Lowry	10	Cleveland Cavaliers	7 May 2018
Kyle Lowry	10	Orlando Magic	19 April 2019
Fred VanVleet	10	Orlando Magic	23 April 2019
Kyle Lowry	10	Golden State Warriors	13 June 2019
Fred VanVleet	10	Brooklyn Nets	19 August 2020
Pascal Siakam	10	Brooklyn Nets	23 August 2020

=== Most blocks (playoffs) ===
Most blocks
Player	Blocks
Serge Ibaka	67
Jonas Valančiūnas	43
Pascal Siakam	33
Marc Gasol	33
Antonio Davis	31
Bismack Biyombo	27
Vince Carter	24
Kyle Lowry	22
OG Anunoby	18
Fred VanVleet	17
Kawhi Leonard	17
Patrick Patterson	14
Chris Bosh	13
Terrence Ross	12
DeMarre Carroll	12
Keon Clark	11
DeMar DeRozan	11
Danny Green	11
Alvin Williams	10
Delon Wright	10

=== Most blocks in a game (playoffs) ===
Most blocks in a playoff game
Player	Blocks	Opponent	Date
6 blocks
Serge Ibaka	6	Golden State Warriors	5 June 2019
5 blocks
Marc Gasol	5	Milwaukee Bucks	19 May 2019
4 blocks
Antonio Davis	4	New York Knicks	30 April 2000
Antonio Davis	4	New York Knicks	2 May 2001
Vince Carter	4	Philadelphia 76ers	11 May 2001
Chris Bosh	4	New Jersey Nets	1 May 2007
Bismack Biyombo	4	Miami Heat	11 May 2016
Bismack Biyombo	4	Cleveland Cavaliers	21 May 2016

=== Most steals (playoffs) ===
Most steals
Player	Steals
Kyle Lowry	120
DeMar DeRozan	55
Pascal Siakam	46
Fred VanVleet	44
Kawhi Leonard	40
Norman Powell	38
Danny Green	32
DeMarre Carroll	26
Marc Gasol	26
Vince Carter	23
OG Anunoby	23
Terrence Ross	22
Cory Joseph	22
Delon Wright	22
Alvin Williams	21
Patrick Patterson	20
Jerome Williams	19
Charles Oakley	18
Jonas Valančiūnas	18
Serge Ibaka	17

=== Most steals in a game (playoffs) ===
Most steals in a playoff game
Player	Steals	Opponent	Date
5 steals
DeMar DeRozan	5	Milwaukee Bucks	27 April 2017
4 steals
Charles Oakley	4	New York Knicks	30 April 2000
Vince Carter	4	Philadelphia 76ers	18 May 2001
Morris Peterson	4	New York Knicks	27 April 2002
Anthony Parker	4	New Jersey Nets	24 April 2007
José Calderón	4	New Jersey Nets	4 May 2007
Kyle Lowry	4	Washington Wizards	24 April 2015
DeMarre Carroll	4	Miami Heat	5 May 2016
Kyle Lowry	4	Miami Heat	9 May 2016
Kyle Lowry	4	Miami Heat	15 May 2016
DeMar DeRozan	4	Milwaukee Bucks	22 April 2017
Kawhi Leonard	4	Golden State Warriors	7 June 2019

=== Most double doubles (playoffs) ===
1. Jonas Valančiūnas – 17
2. Antonio Davis – 12
3. Pascal Siakam – 12
4. Kyle Lowry – 11
5. Kawhi Leonard – 9
6. Chris Bosh; Serge Ibaka – 5

=== Most field goals made (playoffs) ===
Most field goals made
Player	FGs
Kyle Lowry	480

=== Most field goals attempted (playoffs) ===
Most field goals attempted
Player	Attempts
Kyle Lowry	1133

=== Most three-point field goals made (playoffs) ===
Most 3-pt FGs made
Player	3-pt FGs
Kyle Lowry	180
Fred VanVleet	103
Norman Powell	69
Kawhi Leonard	55
Serge Ibaka	53
Pascal Siakam	46
OG Anunoby	44
Patrick Patterson	43
Marc Gasol	39
Danny Green	39
DeMarre Carroll	33
Terrence Ross	31
Vince Carter	26
DeMar DeRozan	24
Chris Childs	23
Dell Curry	20
C. J. Miles	19
Cory Joseph	17
Greivis Vásquez	15
Alvin Williams	13
José Calderón	13
Anthony Parker	13
Jason Kapono	13
Gary Trent Jr.	13

=== Most three-point field goals made in a game (playoffs) ===
Most 3-pt FGs made in a game
Player	3-pt FGs	Date	Opponent
Vince Carter	9	11 May 2001	Philadelphia 76ers
Fred VanVleet	8	17 August 2020	Brooklyn Nets
Kyle Lowry	7	15 May 2019	Milwaukee Bucks
Fred VanVleet	7	23 May 2019	Milwaukee Bucks

=== Most free throws made (playoffs) ===
Most free throws made
Player	FTs
DeMar DeRozan	299
Kyle Lowry	295
Kawhi Leonard	191
Pascal Siakam	143
Jonas Valančiūnas	102

=== Most free throws made in a game (playoffs) ===
Most FTs made in a game
Player	FTs	Date	Opponent
Kawhi Leonard	16	2 June 2019	Golden State Warriors

=== Most free throws attempted (playoffs) ===
Most free throws attempted
Player	Attempts
Kyle Lowry	370
DeMar DeRozan	352
Kawhi Leonard	216
Pascal Siakam	189
Jonas Valančiūnas	136

== Franchise record for wins ==
Regular season wins
Wins	Season
Most wins
59	2017–18
Most home wins
34	2017–18
Most road wins
27	2019–20
Best start to the season
6–0	2018–19
Playoffs wins
Most wins in the playoffs
16	2018–19
Most wins in a playoff series
4	2018–19

== Franchise record for championships ==
Championships
Championships	Season
NBA championships
1	2019
Conference championships
1	2019
Division championships
7	2007; 2014; 2015; 2016; 2018; 2019; 2020

== See also ==
- NBA records
