= Alvin Williams =

American basketball player and coach

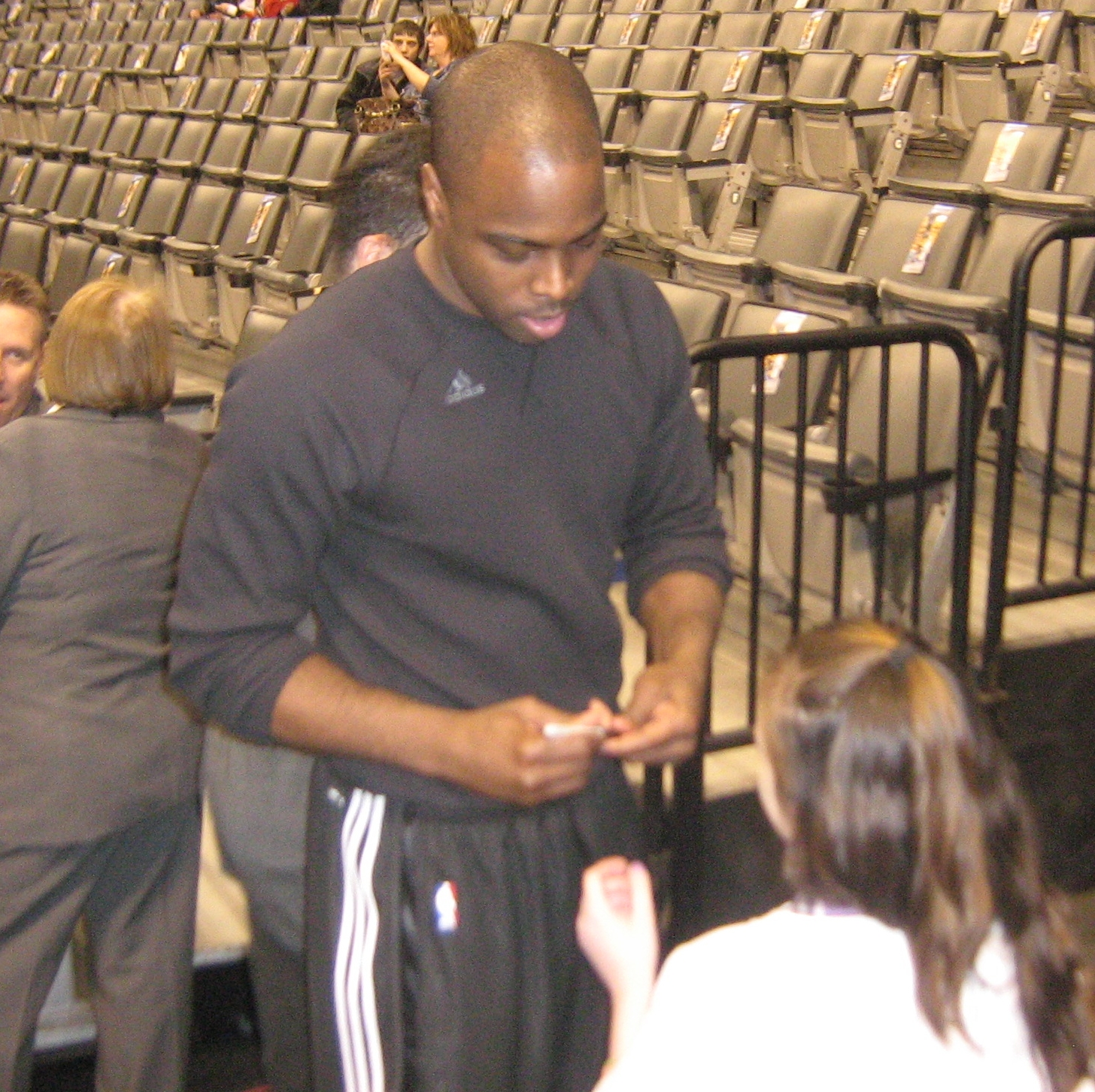
- Williams in 2011

Personal information
- Born: August 6, 1974 (age 52) Philadelphia, Pennsylvania, U.S.
- Listed height: 6 ft 5 in (1.96 m)
- Listed weight: 185 lb (84 kg)

Career information
- High school: Germantown Academy (Fort Washington, Pennsylvania)
- College: Villanova (1993–1997)
- NBA draft: 1997: 2nd round, 47th overall pick
- Drafted by: Portland Trail Blazers
- Playing career: 1997–2007
- Position: Point guard / shooting guard
- Number: 21, 22, 20, 24
- Coaching career: 2009–2012

Career history

Playing
- 1997–1998: Portland Trail Blazers
- 1998–2006: Toronto Raptors
- 2007: Los Angeles Clippers

Coaching
- 2009–2012: Toronto Raptors (assistant)

Career highlights
- NIT champion (1994); First-team All-Big East (1997); Robert V. Geasey Trophy co-winner (1997)

Career NBA statistics
- Points: 4,161 (9.0 ppg)
- Assists: 1,877 (4.1 apg)
- Steals: 549 (1.2 spg)
- Stats at NBA.com
- Stats at Basketball Reference

Alvin Leon Williams Jr. (born August 6, 1974) is an American former professional basketball player who played for Villanova University and in the National Basketball Association (NBA) from 1997 to 2007.

== College career ==
Williams graduated from Germantown Academy in 1993 where he was in the same graduating class as Bradley Cooper. He then went to Villanova as one of the most highly touted recruits sounding a charge led by head coach Steve Lappas to restart bringing homegrown talent from Philadelphia to the Wildcats, which had been dormant for years under head coach Rollie Massimino. During his senior season, Williams led Villanova in scoring and assists with 17 points and 4.5 assists per game. Along with Tim Thomas, Williams would take Villanova to a regular season Big East title and a berth in the 1997 NCAA tournament where they lost in the Second round to California featuring future NFL All-Pro Tony Gonzalez.

== Professional career ==
=== Toronto Raptors ===
After being drafted by the Portland Trail Blazers in the second round of the 1997 NBA draft, Williams was traded to the Toronto Raptors in February 1998.

Williams was in the Raptors' rotation under head coach Butch Carter and greatly improved as the starting point guard under head coach Lenny Wilkens in 2001. He started all 82 games for two straight seasons in 2001–02 and 2002–03. During the 2002–03 season, which was his best statistical season as a professional, Williams averaged 13.2 points and 5.3 assists per game. After missing a third of the 2003–04 and the entire 2004–05 season with a knee injury, Williams rejoined the lineup at the start of the 2005–06 season and played one game before the injured knee put him back on the injured list.

On July 26, 2006, Williams was waived by the Raptors to make room for free agent guard Fred Jones. Reports said both the team and Williams had reached an agreement that resulted in the Raptors only having to pay half of Williams's remaining salary.

=== Los Angeles Clippers ===
On January 20, 2007, Williams signed a 10-day contract with the Los Angeles Clippers. He was not signed to a second contract after the first expired after appearing in two games in limited action.

== NBA career statistics ==
Legend
| GP | Games played | GS | Games started | MPG | Minutes per game |
| FG% | Field goal percentage | 3P% | 3-point field goal percentage | FT% | Free throw percentage |
| RPG | Rebounds per game | APG | Assists per game | SPG | Steals per game |
| BPG | Blocks per game | PPG | Points per game | **Bold** | Career high |
| * | Led the league |

=== Regular season ===
| Year | Team | GP | GS | MPG | FG% | 3P% | FT% | RPG | APG | SPG | BPG | PPG |
|---|---|---|---|---|---|---|---|---|---|---|---|---|
| 1997–98 | Portland | 41 | 10 | 21.1 | **.458** | .292 | .734 | 1.5 | 2.0 | .7 | .0 | 6.9 |
| 1997–98 | Toronto | 13 | 3 | 15.9 | .364 | **.500** | .636 | 1.6 | 1.5 | .6 | .1 | 3.2 |
| 1998–99 | Toronto | 50* | 45 | 21.0 | .401 | .333 | **.846** | 1.6 | 2.6 | 1.0 | .2 | 5.0 |
| 1999–00 | Toronto | 55 | 28 | 14.2 | .397 | .291 | .738 | 1.5 | 2.3 | .6 | .2 | 5.3 |
| 2000–01 | Toronto | **82** | 34 | 29.2 | .430 | .306 | .752 | 2.6 | 5.0 | 1.5 | **.3** | 9.8 |
| 2001–02 | Toronto | **82** | **82** | **35.7** | .415 | .321 | .736 | **3.4** | **5.7** | **1.6** | **.3** | 11.8 |
| 2002–03 | Toronto | 78 | 78 | 33.8 | .438 | .329 | .782 | 3.1 | 5.3 | 1.4 | **.3** | **13.2** |
| 2003–04 | Toronto | 56 | 54 | 30.9 | .405 | .292 | .776 | 2.7 | 4.0 | 1.0 | .2 | 8.8 |
| 2005–06 | Toronto | 1 | 0 | 9.8 | .000 | .000 | .500 | 3.0 | .0 | .0 | .0 | 1.0 |
| 2006–07 | L.A. Clippers | 2 | 0 | 4.8 | .000 | .000 | .500 | .5 | 1.5 | 1.0 | .0 | 1.0 |
| Career | | 460 | 334 | 27.4 | .421 | .313 | .760 | 2.5 | 4.1 | 1.2 | .2 | 9.0 |

=== Playoffs ===
| Year | Team | GP | GS | MPG | FG% | 3P% | FT% | RPG | APG | SPG | BPG | PPG |
|---|---|---|---|---|---|---|---|---|---|---|---|---|
| 2000 | Toronto | 1 | 0 | 1.0 | – | – | – | .0 | .0 | .0 | .0 | .0 |
| 2001 | Toronto | **12** | **12** | **40.5** | **.431** | **.357** | .680 | 2.9 | 4.2 | **1.3** | **.7** | **13.8** |
| 2002 | Toronto | 5 | 5 | 39.3 | .320 | .214 | **.818** | **4.8** | **5.6** | 1.2 | .4 | 12.0 |
| Career | | 18 | 17 | 38.0 | .396 | .310 | .722 | 3.3 | 4.3 | 1.2 | .6 | 12.5 |

== Post-playing career ==
On July 1, 2009, the Raptors announced the hiring of Williams as an assistant coach for the team. This would mark the return of Williams to the organization since being waived by the team less than three years earlier.

On September 24, 2010, the Raptors announced that Williams would become the team's Director of Player Development.

In June 2013 he was let go from his position with the Raptors.

Since 2015 Williams has been an NBA Analyst with Rogers Sportsnet.

In September 2021, Rogers Sportsnet and the Toronto Raptors announced that Williams would take over the colour commentary duties on all Rogers Sportsnet broadcasts of Raptors games, replacing Leo Rautins on that network.

== See also ==
- Toronto Raptors accomplishments and records
