= Derrick McKey =

American basketball player (born 1966)

Personal information
- Born: October 10, 1966 (age 60) Meridian, Mississippi, U.S.
- Listed height: 6 ft 10 in (2.08 m)
- Listed weight: 241 lb (109 kg)

Career information
- High school: Meridian (Meridian, Mississippi)
- College: Alabama (1984–1987)
- NBA draft: 1987: 1st round, 9th overall pick
- Drafted by: Seattle SuperSonics
- Playing career: 1987–2002
- Position: Small forward / power forward
- Number: 31, 9, 23

Career history
- 1987–1993: Seattle SuperSonics
- 1993–2001: Indiana Pacers
- 2002: Philadelphia 76ers

Career highlights
- 2× NBA All-Defensive Second Team (1995, 1996); NBA All-Rookie First Team (1988); Second-team All-American – UPI (1987); Third-team All-American – AP, NABC (1987); SEC Player of the Year (1987); First-team All-SEC (1987); Second-team All-SEC (1986)

Career NBA statistics
- Points: 10,266 (11.0 ppg)
- Rebounds: 4,387 (4.7 rpg)
- Assists: 2,254 (2.4 apg)
- Stats at NBA.com
- Stats at Basketball Reference
Medals
Men's basketball
Representing United States
FIBA World Championship
Gold medal – first place	1986 Spain	National team

Derrick Wayne McKey (born October 10, 1966) is an American former basketball player who played most of his National Basketball Association (NBA) career at the small forward and the power forward positions.

== Early life and college career ==
McKey attended Meridian High School in his Mississippi hometown, where he excelled on the team's basketball squad. In addition to being a star basketball player in high school, he was a shortstop on the baseball team despite being 6 feet 10 inches (2.08 m). He attended the University of Alabama for three years, leading the Tide to a regional No. 2 seed in 1986–87 and to the Sweet 16 (where they were eliminated by Providence). He played for the US national team in the 1986 FIBA World Championship, winning the gold medal.

== NBA career ==
He declared for the NBA after his junior season and was selected by the Seattle SuperSonics with the ninth overall pick of the 1987 NBA draft, ahead of, notably, Reggie Miller, Horace Grant and Reggie Lewis. In the 1988–89 season, McKey averaged 15.9 PPG, his best scoring average in a season.

McKey spent the following six seasons in Seattle, where he was known as one third of the "Big Mac" team of the late 1980s and early 1990s Seattle SuperSonics, the others being Nate McMillan and Xavier McDaniel. At the start of the 1993–94 NBA season he was traded to the Indiana Pacers along with teammate Gerald Paddio for Detlef Schrempf. After years of playoff disappointments, he and the Pacers finally reached the NBA Finals in 2000, before losing to the Los Angeles Lakers. He then spent the 2001–2002 season, the last of his career, with the Philadelphia 76ers.

== Style and career ==
At 6'10", McKey was mostly known for his defensive skills, his emphasis on teamwork play, and his versatility, which allowed him to guard opposing players of any position. Consequently, he was elected twice to the All-NBA Second Defensive Team. As a team-oriented player, he averaged 2.4 assists per game for his career, with a career high of 4.3 per game in 1993–94.

== Career statistics ==
Legend
GP	Games played	GS	Games started	MPG	Minutes per game
FG%	Field goal percentage	3P%	3-point field goal percentage	FT%	Free throw percentage
RPG	Rebounds per game	APG	Assists per game	SPG	Steals per game
BPG	Blocks per game	PPG	Points per game	**Bold**	Career high
*	Led the league

=== NBA ===
==== Regular season ====
Year	Team	GP	GS	MPG	FG%	3P%	FT%	RPG	APG	SPG	BPG	PPG
1987–88	Seattle	**82**	4	20.8	.491	.367	.772	4.0	1.3	.9	.8	8.5
1988–89	Seattle	**82***	**82***	34.2	.502	.337	.803	5.7	2.7	1.3	.9	**15.9**
1989–90	Seattle	80	80	34.4	.493	.130	.782	**6.1**	2.3	1.1	**1.0**	15.7
1990–91	Seattle	73	55	34.3	**.517**	.211	.845	5.8	2.3	1.2	.8	15.3
1991–92	Seattle	52	44	33.8	.472	.380	**.847**	5.2	2.3	1.2	.9	14.9
1992–93	Seattle	77	68	31.7	.496	.357	.741	4.2	2.6	1.4	.8	13.4
1993–94	Indiana	76	76	34.4	.500	.290	.756	5.3	**4.3**	**1.5**	.6	12.0
1994–95	Indiana	81	81	**34.6**	.493	.360	.744	4.9	3.4	**1.5**	.6	13.3
1995–96	Indiana	75	75	32.5	.486	.250	.769	4.8	3.5	1.1	.6	11.7
1996–97	Indiana	50	49	29.0	.391	.259	.724	4.8	2.7	.9	.6	8.0
1997–98	Indiana	57	4	23.1	.459	.235	.714	3.7	1.5	1.0	.5	6.3
1998–99	Indiana	13	0	18.8	.442	.000	.824	3.2	1.0	.9	.3	4.6
1999–00	Indiana	32	0	19.8	.398	**.435**	.768	4.2	1.1	.9	.4	4.3
2000–01	Indiana	66	20	15.0	.441	.200	.778	2.7	1.1	.7	.2	2.2
2001–02	Philadelphia	41	1	19.1	.426	.417	.714	3.1	1.1	1.0	.1	2.9
Career		937	639	29.1	.486	.316	.779	4.7	2.4	1.1	.7	11.0

==== Playoffs ====
Year	Team	GP	GS	MPG	FG%	3P%	FT%	RPG	APG	SPG	BPG	PPG
1988	Seattle	5	0	21.8	**.632**	.333	.588	4.0	1.6	.6	1.0	12.0
1989	Seattle	8	8	35.8	.494	.111	.810	6.5	2.3	.8	**1.9**	13.3
1991	Seattle	4	0	28.5	.571	.000	.545	5.8	2.0	.8	.0	9.5
1992	Seattle	9	9	35.0	.525	.313	.844	4.9	2.7	.8	1.3	**16.3**
1993	Seattle	19	**17**	34.1	.525	.400	.667	5.2	3.7	.6	.9	11.3
1994	Indiana	16	16	**36.7**	.408	.333	.660	6.1	**4.2**	**1.6**	.6	9.7
1995	Indiana	17	**17**	34.8	.437	.314	**.871**	4.8	3.8	1.0	.6	12.8
1996	Indiana	5	5	36.0	.421	.417	.846	**6.6**	2.0	1.4	.2	12.8
1998	Indiana	15	0	18.9	.333	.300	.783	2.7	.7	.6	.5	4.5
1999	Indiana	13	0	18.8	.375	.000	.654	3.3	1.5	.9	.3	3.6
2000	Indiana	**23**	0	15.3	.469	.167	.800	3.4	.6	.3	.2	2.0
2001	Indiana	4	0	8.8	.400	**1.000**	.500	2.3	1.0	.3	.0	1.5
2002	Philadelphia	4	0	10.0	.500	–	–	1.5	.3	.3	.5	2.0
Career		142	72	26.7	.464	.302	.744	4.4	2.2	.8	.6	8.3
