= LaSalle Thompson =

American basketball player (born 1961)

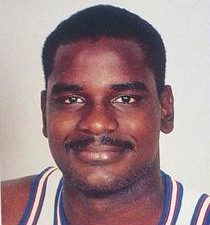
- Thompson, circa 1986

Personal information
- Born: June 23, 1961 (age 65) Cincinnati, Ohio, U.S.
- Listed height: 6 ft 10 in (2.08 m)
- Listed weight: 245 lb (111 kg)

Career information
- High school: Withrow (Cincinnati, Ohio)
- College: Texas (1979–1982)
- NBA draft: 1982: 1st round, 5th overall pick
- Drafted by: Kansas City Kings
- Playing career: 1981–1997
- Position: Center / power forward
- Number: 41
- Coaching career: 2008–2014

Career history

Playing
- 1982–1989: Kansas City / Sacramento Kings
- 1989–1995: Indiana Pacers
- 1996: Philadelphia 76ers
- 1996–1997: Denver Nuggets
- 1997: Indiana Pacers

Coaching
- 2000–2001: San Diego Wildfire
- 2008–2010: Charlotte Bobcats (assistant)
- 2012–2014: New York Knicks (assistant)

Career highlights
- NCAA rebounding leader (1982); 2× First-team All-SWC (1981, 1982)

Career NBA statistics
- Points: 7,806 (7.9 ppg)
- Rebounds: 6,689 (6.8 rpg)
- Blocks: 972 (1.0 bpg)
- Stats at NBA.com
- Stats at Basketball Reference

LaSalle Thompson III (born June 23, 1961) is an American former professional basketball player, who spent most of his 15-year career with the Kansas City/Sacramento Kings and Indiana Pacers. The 6 ft 10 in, 245-pound Thompson played the center position during his playing career. He later served as an assistant coach for the Charlotte Bobcats, during head coach Larry Brown's tenure and for the New York Knicks during head coach Mike Woodson's tenure.

== Playing career ==
=== College ===
Nicknamed "Tank", Thompson finished his career at Texas as the school's all-time leader in rebounds with 1,027, despite the fact he played only three years. The record would stand for 21 years until it was broken by James Thomas in 2004.

=== Kansas City/Sacramento Kings ===
Thompson was drafted by the Kings with the fifth overall pick in the 1982 NBA draft, making him the highest Texas player taken until LaMarcus Aldridge was selected second overall in 2006. During the 1984 NBA playoffs, Thompson averaged what would be postseason career-highs of 15 points and 10 rebounds per game, during a first round loss against the Los Angeles Lakers.

In 1989–1990, he averaged 13.9 points and 9.4 rebounds per game while spending a half-season in Sacramento and the other half in Indiana. That season, while still on the Kings, Thompson scored a career-high 31 points during a 147–142 loss to the Portland Trail Blazers.

=== Indiana Pacers ===
A regular starter for most of the first part of his career, in 1992–1993 Thompson moved to a role as the tough-nosed veteran off the bench, as Rik Smits and Dale Davis started every game in which they played. Thompson was a key reserve on the first Pacers team to reach the Eastern Conference Finals series, in 1993–1994.

=== Philadelphia 76ers and Denver Nuggets ===
After the 1994–1995 season, Thompson signed with the Philadelphia 76ers, playing there for a year before going to the Denver Nuggets.

=== Return to the Pacers ===
He ended his career with nine more games in a Pacers uniform, following the trade-deadline deal that also brought Mark Jackson back to Indiana.

== Post-NBA career ==
Thompson served a stint as general manager and head coach of the San Diego Wildfire in the American Basketball Association in the 2000–01 season, which would be the only season of the Wildfire's existence.

He is co-owner of Prime Time Motors, an automobile sales firm in California.

On May 30, 2008, Thompson accepted an offer from Larry Brown (for whom he played during his stints with Indiana Pacers) and the Charlotte Bobcats to become an assistant coach where he worked until Larry Brown parted ways with the Bobcats after the team started the season 9–19 on December 22, 2010.

Before the start of 2012–13 NBA season, Thompson became assistant coach of the New York Knicks under Mike Woodson (with whom he played for Kings in Kansas City and Sacramento) replacing Kenny Atkinson who quit joining the Atlanta Hawks staff. He worked for Knicks for 2 seasons until Woodson was fired on April 21, 2014.

Has one son, Nickolas who plays basketball at Jonesboro High School in Jonesboro, Arkansas, and one daughter (Ruby) who plays volleyball for Evanston Township High School in Evanston, Illinois, and club at Sports Performance Volleyball Club.

== Career statistics ==
Legend
GP	Games played	GS	Games started	MPG	Minutes per game
FG%	Field goal percentage	3P%	3-point field goal percentage	FT%	Free throw percentage
RPG	Rebounds per game	APG	Assists per game	SPG	Steals per game
BPG	Blocks per game	PPG	Points per game	**Bold**	Career high
*	Led the league

=== NBA ===
==== Regular season ====
Year	Team	GP	GS	MPG	FG%	3P%	FT%	RPG	APG	SPG	BPG	PPG
1982–83	Kansas City	71	3	13.9	.512	.000	.650	5.3	.5	.6	.9	5.4
1983–84	Kansas City	80	38	23.9	.523	–	.717	8.9	1.1	.9	**1.8**	10.3
1984–85	Kansas City	**82***	**77**	30.0	.531	–	.721	**10.4**	1.6	**1.2**	1.6	11.8
1985–86	Sacramento	80	64	29.7	.518	.000	.732	9.6	**2.1**	.9	1.4	12.8
1986–87	Sacramento	**82***	53	26.4	.481	.000	.737	8.4	1.5	.8	1.5	11.1
1987–88	Sacramento	69	9	18.2	.471	**.400**	.720	6.2	1.0	.8	1.1	8.0
1988–89	Sacramento	43	42	29.7	.461	.000	.809	9.1	1.0	1.1	1.3	**15.0**
1988–89	Indiana	33	29	**31.9**	**.538**	–	.806	9.9	1.1	1.0	1.2	12.5
1989–90	Indiana	**82***	60	25.9	.473	.200	.799	7.7	1.3	.8	.9	6.8
1990–91	Indiana	**82***	**77**	23.7	.488	.200	.692	6.9	1.8	.8	.8	7.6
1991–92	Indiana	80	49	16.2	.468	.000	.817	4.8	1.3	.7	.4	4.9
1992–93	Indiana	63	0	11.6	.488	.000	.744	2.8	.5	.5	.4	3.8
1993–94	Indiana	30	1	9.4	.351	–	.533	2.5	.5	.3	.3	2.3
1994–95	Indiana	38	3	11.9	.415	–	**.875**	2.3	.5	.5	.3	2.9
1995–96	Philadelphia	44	11	17.6	.398	–	.792	4.5	.6	.4	.5	1.9
1996–97	Denver	17	0	6.2	.188	–	.500	1.5	.0	.2	.4	.4
1996–97	Indiana	9	0	39	.000	–	.750	.9	.2	.0	.0	.3
Career		985	516	21.6	.492	.154	.737	6.8	1.2	.8	.1	7.9

==== Playoffs ====
Year	Team	GP	GS	MPG	FG%	3P%	FT%	RPG	APG	SPG	BPG	PPG
1984	Kansas City	3		31.0	.450	–	.818	10.0	1.3	**1.0**	1.3	**15.0**
1986	Sacramento	3	3	**33.0**	.344	–	.583	**11.7**	.7	.7	**2.0**	9.7
1990	Indiana	3	0	18.0	.467	–	**1.000**	5.0	.7	.0	.3	6.0
1991	Indiana	5	**5**	25.2	.487	–	**1.000**	6.2	**1.6**	.8	1.4	9.0
1992	Indiana	3	3	21.0	**.636**	–	**1.000**	4.3	1.3	.3	1.3	5.3
1993	Indiana	4	0	18.3	.333	–	.833	3.5	.8	.8	.5	3.8
1994	Indiana	**7**	0	5.6	.364	–	.667	1.4	.7	.4	.1	1.4
Career		28	11	19.5	.436	–	.800	5.3	1.0	.6	.9	6.4

== See also ==
- List of NCAA Division I men's basketball season rebounding leaders
