= Shawn Kemp =

American basketball player (born 1969)

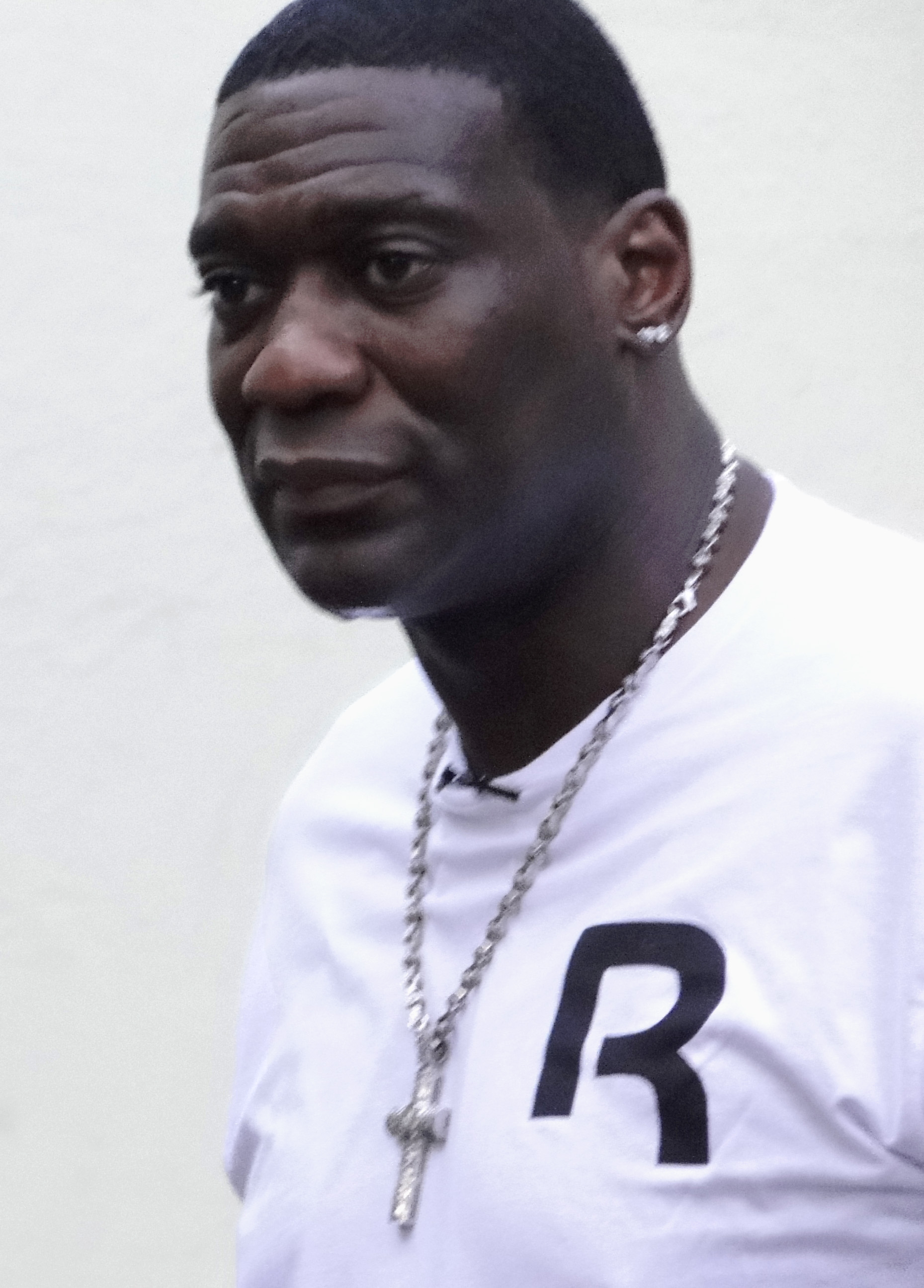
- Kemp in 2012

Personal information
- Born: November 26, 1969 (age 56) Elkhart, Indiana, U.S.
- Listed height: 6 ft 10 in (2.08 m)
- Listed weight: 280 lb (127 kg)

Career information
- High school: Concord (Elkhart, Indiana)
- NBA draft: 1989: 1st round, 17th overall pick
- Drafted by: Seattle SuperSonics
- Playing career: 1989–2003
- Position: Power forward / center
- Number: 40, 4

Career history
- 1989–1997: Seattle SuperSonics
- 1997–2000: Cleveland Cavaliers
- 2000–2002: Portland Trail Blazers
- 2002–2003: Orlando Magic

Career highlights
- 6× NBA All-Star (1993–1998); 3× All-NBA Second Team (1994–1996); McDonald's All-American (1988); First-team Parade All-American (1988); Second-team Parade All-American (1987); Fourth-team Parade All-American (1986)

Career NBA statistics
- Points: 15,347 (14.6 ppg)
- Rebounds: 8,834 (8.4 rpg)
- Blocks: 1,279 (1.2 bpg)
- Stats at NBA.com
- Stats at Basketball Reference
Medals
Men's basketball
Representing the United States
FIBA World Championship
Gold medal – first place	1994 Canada	Team competition

Shawn Travis Kemp Sr. (born November 26, 1969) is an American former professional basketball player who played for the Seattle SuperSonics, Cleveland Cavaliers, Portland Trail Blazers, and Orlando Magic in the National Basketball Association (NBA). Nicknamed "Reign Man", he was a six-time NBA All-Star and a three-time All-NBA Second Team member. Kemp is widely regarded as one of the best slam dunkers of all time and made the 1996 NBA Finals with the SuperSonics.

Kemp was a member of the United States national team at the 1994 FIBA World Championship where he won gold and was named to the All-Tournament team. He was part of a famous pick and roll duo with Hall of Fame teammate Gary Payton.

== Early years ==
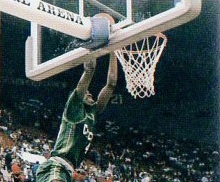
Kemp playing for the Concord High School varsity basketball team in 1987–88

Kemp attended Concord High School in Elkhart, Indiana. At the prestigious B/C All-Star Camp on his first day, Kemp outplayed highly regarded prep star Terry Mills. A four-year varsity starter, he was considered to be one of the top four or five players nationally his senior year, and led his team to the state championship finals. Kemp ended his high school career as Elkhart County's all-time leading scorer and the owner of Concord's career, single-game and single-season scoring records. Despite his achievements and accolades, Kemp was bypassed for the title of Indiana Mr. Basketball as Woody Austin won the award that year instead. (Kemp, however, was Gatorade's choice for state player of the year.) There has been some speculation that Kemp was purposely passed over for the award because he verbally committed to the University of Kentucky and did not express interest in staying in-state to play college basketball (Austin committed to Purdue University.) Kemp was selected to the 1988 McDonald's High School All-American team (considered one of the best classes of all time), along with such notable players as Alonzo Mourning, Billy Owens, Anthony Peeler, and Malik Sealy. Kemp scored a team-high 18 points for the West in a 105–99 loss.

During his senior year, Kemp signed a national letter-of-intent to play basketball at the University of Kentucky. However, Kemp failed to score the minimum of 700 on the Scholastic Aptitude Test, or SAT, and was forced to miss his freshman year under the NCAA's Proposition 48 rules. Jim Hahn, Kemp's high school coach, did not like the idea of Kemp being in Kentucky without playing basketball, saying "To have Shawn in a college environment without basketball, the one thing he loves, was, I felt, a big mistake. It even crossed my mind to advise him to go right into the NBA and the only thing that stopped me was the fact that so few players have done it." Kemp decided to enroll at Kentucky. However, he left the team in November 1988 after he was accused of pawning two gold chains that had been reported stolen from his teammate Sean Sutton, the son of then Kentucky head coach Eddie Sutton. Sean Sutton did not press charges but Kemp transferred to Trinity Valley Community College in Texas. After a semester at TVCC, where he did not play, 19-year-old Kemp declared himself eligible for the 1989 NBA draft.

== Professional career ==
=== Seattle SuperSonics (1989–1997) ===
The Seattle SuperSonics drafted Kemp, in the first round of the 1989 NBA draft. Although extremely athletic, Kemp was the youngest player in the NBA at that time and struggled to find his place. In his first season in Seattle, Kemp was mentored heavily by teammate Xavier McDaniel. As the season progressed, so did Kemp's skills, which propelled him into stardom. Kemp began to find his place in the NBA as a star during his second season with the SuperSonics. Together with Gary Payton, Eddie Johnson, Ricky Pierce and Nate McMillan, they became a highly successful squad.

After Kemp's second NBA season, he picked up the nickname "Reign Man" after the SuperSonics' announcer Kevin Calabro saw a poster with the name and thought it fitting to add to his radio broadcasts.

In 1992 during a playoff game against the Golden State Warriors, Kemp dunked over center Alton Lister, which colloquially became known as "The Lister Blister".

In 1994, Kemp appeared in the MTV Rock N' Jock annual celebrity basketball game.

Kemp's career peaked in 1995–96, when he and Payton led the SuperSonics to a franchise-record 64 wins and their first NBA Finals appearance since 1979. They faced Michael Jordan and the Chicago Bulls, who were coming off an NBA record 72 wins. The SuperSonics pushed the heavily favored Bulls to six games before losing. In the Finals, Kemp posted per game averages of 23.3 points on 55% shooting from the field, 10.0 rebounds and two blocks. Shawn Kemp finished a close second in Finals MVP voting, almost becoming the second player to win the award despite being from the losing team.

During his time in Seattle, Kemp occasionally played during the offseason on an outdoor court in Seattle's Belltown district.

Kemp signed a contract extension with the SuperSonics in 1994. The league's collective bargaining agreement (CBA) precluded any adjustment to that contract until October 1997. He was upset by the situation, but his agent, Tony Dutte, understood that no negotiation was permitted. During this time, the SuperSonics signed Jim McIlvaine to a seven-year, $33.6 million contract, exceeding Kemp's salary. Kemp threatened to refuse to play in the upcoming 1996–97 season and held out of training camp for 22 days. Despite this absence, Kemp helped lead the SuperSonics to another 50-plus-win season as they dispatched the Phoenix Suns in five games in the first round, only to lose to the Hakeem Olajuwon, Clyde Drexler and Charles Barkley-led Houston Rockets in a seven-game series in the second round of the NBA Playoffs. Following the 1996–1997 season, Kemp was part of a trade sending him to the Cleveland Cavaliers, Milwaukee Bucks forward Vin Baker to the SuperSonics, and Terrell Brandon and Tyrone Hill from the Cavaliers to the Bucks.

=== Cleveland Cavaliers (1997–2000) ===
Kemp played three seasons with the Cavaliers where he posted career-high numbers for points per game in 1997–98 and led the Cavaliers to the NBA Playoffs, where they faced the Reggie Miller-led Indiana Pacers. The Cavaliers lost to the Pacers in four games despite Kemp averaging 26 points with 13 rebounds per game in the series.

During the lockout shortened 1998–1999 NBA season, Kemp reportedly showed up to training camp weighing 280 pounds, though Cleveland's then general manager Wayne Embry revealed that he was actually 315 pounds.

=== Portland Trail Blazers (2000–2002) ===
Kemp was then traded to the Portland Trail Blazers after the 1999–2000 season, in a three-team trade involving the Miami Heat; the Cavaliers received Clarence Weatherspoon, Chris Gatling, Gary Grant and draft considerations, while the Heat received Brian Grant. The trade reunited Kemp with Bob Whitsitt, who had originally brought Kemp to Seattle. However, Kemp's play began to decline significantly. After two seasons with the Blazers, Kemp was waived prior to the 2002–03 season.

=== Orlando Magic (2002–2003) ===
Kemp was signed as a free agent by the Magic, and helped the Magic reach the playoffs despite the loss of starting small forward Grant Hill. During his one season in Orlando, Kemp played in his 1000th NBA game. In their first round series, the Magic took an early three games to one lead before losing to the Detroit Pistons in seven games. Following the 2002–03 season, Kemp was replaced by free agent forward Juwan Howard.

=== Comeback attempts and retirement ===
In April of the 2005–06 NBA season, Kemp's NBA comeback chances looked promising. The eventual Western Conference champion Dallas Mavericks considered adding Kemp to their roster in time for the NBA playoffs. Mavericks' coach, and former SuperSonics' teammate, Avery Johnson scheduled a personal workout to take place in Houston, where Kemp trained for several months. Kemp failed to appear because of undisclosed reasons. The two parties tried to reschedule a workout but the NBA refused to grant Dallas an injury exception (for a 16th player). Kemp did not get a second chance to join the Mavericks that season.

In June 2006, three months after a drug arrest, the Denver Post reported that Kemp had slimmed down to the playing weight of his All-Star days and was determined to join an NBA team, possibly the Denver Nuggets, and finish his career "the right way." The Nuggets ultimately turned their attention away from Kemp, signing power forward Reggie Evans. Kemp drew some interest from the Chicago Bulls in September 2006, but missed his scheduled workout.

During the half time of the SuperSonics' game on November 5, 2006, Kemp was announced as one of the 16 members of the SuperSonics' 40-year anniversary team. After having the longest ovation of all the players, Kemp said after the celebration that he would play with a team in Rome and was still considering a comeback to the NBA. Kemp, however, did not secure a position on an NBA roster during the 2006–07 season.

On August 18, 2008, Kemp signed a one-year contract with Premiata Montegranaro of Italian League. Despite being almost 39, he was said to be in good shape. The Premiata deal came about due to the good relationship between Kemp and Roberto Carmenati, the new Team Director of Montegranaro. Kemp reported to the team, played in three preseason games, then returned to Houston to assess his home for damage from Hurricane Ike. Kemp and Premiata Montegranaro decided to part ways, and the contract was rescinded.

After his active career he tried to bring basketball back to Seattle. Kemp bought a mansion in Seattle in 2003 for $2.4 million, the year he retired from the NBA. In 2008, he listed the property for $3.7 million.

== National team career ==
Kemp played for the US national team in the 1994 FIBA World Championship in Toronto, where he won the gold medal and was named to the All-Tournament team along with teammates Shaquille O'Neal and Reggie Miller. For the tournament, he averaged 9.4 points on a 68.9% shooting along with 6.8 rebounds, including 14 points and 9 rebounds in the championship clinching game against Russia.

== Personal life ==
Kemp has fathered at least seven children with six different women. His oldest son, Shawn Kemp Jr., played basketball for the University of Washington and another son, Jamon, played basketball at Southeastern Louisiana University.

Kemp appeared on the 2009 season premiere of Pros vs. Joes. A photograph of Kemp dunking over Hakeem Olajuwon appears on the cover of NBA Jam Extreme.

Kemp was the owner of a sports bar in Lower Queen Anne, Seattle named Oskar's Kitchen. The establishment closed in 2015. Kemp now owns a part of Amber's Kitchen on 1st Avenue in Seattle as well as a controlling interest in several Seattle venues.

In October 2020, Kemp was part of a group that opened a cannabis dispensary in Seattle named Shawn Kemp's Cannabis. He was joined at the grand opening by former teammate Gary Payton, whose Cookies brand cannabis strain he sells at the shop.

=== Legal problems ===
On April 4, 2005, Kemp was arrested in Shoreline, Washington, for an investigation of drug possession. Kemp and another man were found with a small amount of cocaine, about 60 grams of marijuana and a semiautomatic pistol, according to the King County Sheriff's Office. On April 29, Kemp was formally charged with drug possession and pleaded guilty. Kemp was again arrested for misdemeanor marijuana possession in Houston, Texas, on July 21, 2006.

On March 8, 2023, Kemp was arrested in Tacoma, Washington, in connection with an alleged drive-by shooting. Originally released without being charged, the following month Kemp was charged with first degree assault. Kemp pleaded not guilty to the first degree assault charge during a May 4 arraignment hearing in Pierce County Superior Court in Washington state. Following the hearing, he was released without bail. Kemp later pleaded guilty to second-degree assault, which carries a standard sentence of between three and nine months in prison, with one year of community custody. On August 22, 2025, was sentenced to home confinement on the charges.

=== Acting ===
Kemp had a cameo in Aqua Teen Forever: Plantasm.

== Career statistics ==
Legend
GP	Games played	GS	Games started	MPG	Minutes per game
FG%	Field goal percentage	3P%	3-point field goal percentage	FT%	Free throw percentage
RPG	Rebounds per game	APG	Assists per game	SPG	Steals per game
BPG	Blocks per game	PPG	Points per game	**Bold**	Career high
*	Led the league

=== Regular season ===
Year	Team	GP	GS	MPG	FG%	3P%	FT%	RPG	APG	SPG	BPG	PPG
1989–90	Seattle	81	1	13.8	.479	.167	.736	4.3	.3	.6	.9	6.5
1990–91	Seattle	81	66	30.1	.508	.167	.661	8.4	1.8	1.0	1.5	15.0
1991–92	Seattle	64	23	28.3	.504	.000	.748	10.4	1.3	1.1	1.9	15.5
1992–93	Seattle	78	68	33.1	.492	.000	.712	10.7	2.0	1.5	1.9	17.8
1993–94	Seattle	79	73	32.9	.538	.250	.741	10.8	**2.6**	**1.8**	**2.1**	18.1
1994–95	Seattle	**82***	79	32.7	.547	.286	.749	10.9	1.8	1.2	1.5	18.7
1995–96	Seattle	79	76	33.3	**.561**	.417	.742	**11.4**	2.2	1.2	1.6	19.6
1996–97	Seattle	81	75	34.0	.510	.364	.742	10.0	1.9	1.5	1.0	18.7
1997–98	Cleveland	80	80	34.6	.445	.250	.727	9.3	2.5	1.4	1.1	18.0
1998–99	Cleveland	42	42	**35.1**	.482	**.500**	.789	9.2	2.4	1.1	1.1	**20.5**
1999–00	Cleveland	**82**	**82***	30.4	.417	.333	.776	8.8	1.7	1.2	1.2	17.8
2000–01	Portland	68	3	15.9	.407	.364	.771	3.8	1.0	.7	.3	6.5
2001–02	Portland	75	5	16.4	.430	.000	**.794**	3.8	.7	.6	.4	6.1
2002–03	Orlando	76	55	20.7	.418	.000	.742	5.7	.7	.8	.4	6.8
Career		1,051	728	27.9	.488	.277	.741	8.4	1.6	1.1	1.2	14.6
All-Star		6	5	20.0	.458	.200	.750	5.8	1.7	1.0	.7	9.0

=== Playoffs ===
Year	Team	GP	GS	MPG	FG%	3P%	FT%	RPG	APG	SPG	BPG	PPG
1991	Seattle	5	5	29.8	.386	.000	.815	7.2	1.2	.6	.8	13.2
1992	Seattle	9	9	37.6	.475	—	.763	12.2	.4	.6	1.6	17.4
1993	Seattle	19	19	34.9	.512	—	.809	10.0	2.6	1.5	2.1	16.5
1994	Seattle	5	5	**41.2**	.371	—	.667	9.8	**3.4**	**2.0**	**2.4**	14.8
1995	Seattle	4	4	40.0	**.579**	**1.000**	.821	12.0	2.8	**2.0**	1.8	24.8
1996	Seattle	**20**	**20**	36.0	.570	.000	.795	10.4	1.5	1.2	2.0	20.9
1997	Seattle	12	12	36.8	.486	.200	.829	**12.3**	3.0	1.2	1.3	21.6
1998	Cleveland	4	4	38.0	.465	—	**.844**	10.3	2.0	1.3	1.0	**26.0**
2002	Portland	3	0	11.7	.286	—	.700	2.7	.0	.3	.0	3.7
2003	Orlando	7	0	10.3	.381	—	.833	2.1	.0	.0	.0	3.0
Career		88	78	33.4	.498	.200	.797	9.7	1.8	1.1	1.6	17.3

== See also ==
- List of NBA career turnovers leaders
- List of NBA career personal fouls leaders
- List of NBA single-game blocks leaders
