= 1996 NBA Finals =

1996 basketball championship series

| Team | Coach | Wins |
|---|---|---|
| Chicago Bulls | Phil Jackson | 4 |
| Seattle SuperSonics | George Karl | 2 |
- Dates: June 5–16
- MVP: Michael Jordan (Chicago Bulls)
- Hall of Famers: Bulls: Michael Jordan (2009); Toni Kukoc (2021); Scottie Pippen (2010); Dennis Rodman (2011); SuperSonics: Gary Payton (2013); Coaches: Phil Jackson (2007); George Karl (2022); Tex Winter (2011); Officials: Dick Bavetta (2015); Danny Crawford (2025); Hugh Evans (2022)
- Eastern finals: Bulls defeated Magic, 4–0
- Western finals: SuperSonics defeated Jazz, 4–3

The 1996 NBA Finals was the championship series of the National Basketball Association's (NBA) 1995–96 season, and the culmination of the season's playoffs. The Western Conference champion Seattle SuperSonics (64–18) played the Eastern Conference champion Chicago Bulls (72–10), with the Bulls holding home court advantage. The teams' 136 combined regular season wins shattered the previous record of 125, set in 1985 between the Los Angeles Lakers who won 62 games and the Boston Celtics who won 63 games in the past regular season. The series, the 50th NBA finals in league history, was played under a best-of-seven format. This was the first championship in the Chicago Bulls' second three-peat.

Chicago won the series 4 games to 2. Michael Jordan was named NBA Finals MVP, his fourth time winning the award.

== Background ==
=== Chicago Bulls ===
The Bulls were coming off a season where they lost in the second round of the playoffs to the Orlando Magic. Heading into the upcoming season, Chicago was no longer the same team as they were in their most recent championship season of 1993, having lost key members of their first three-peat core in John Paxson and Bill Cartwright, both of whom retired, while Horace Grant, B. J. Armstrong, Stacey King, Will Perdue, and Scott Williams all left via free agency.

In their place was a new core of players such as Luc Longley, Toni Kukoč, Steve Kerr, Ron Harper, Jud Buechler, Bill Wennington, and Randy Brown. A notable addition to the team was Dennis Rodman, a nine-year veteran and four year rebounding champion. However, his addition to the team was slightly panned due to his unpredictability and controversial actions on and off the court.

The result of this ensemble was perhaps the greatest regular season of any team in NBA history at the time, as the Bulls won a record-high 72 games, which would be broken by the Golden State Warriors in the 2015–16 season. They continued to gain momentum in the playoffs, beginning with a sweep of the Miami Heat in the first round, followed by a five-game defeat of the New York Knicks in the second round. The conference finals was a rematch of the previous season's series with the Orlando Magic, but it was a no-contest, as the Bulls swept the Magic to gain entry into the Finals.

Due to the win-loss record, Jordan's first full season back from baseball, and the star power of Dennis Rodman, arguably the most well-known player in the NBA outside of Jordan due to his romantic relationship with global pop star Madonna, the Bulls began to be treated like global rock stars. This created an unprecedented frenzy among away fans in opposing cities. Rather than animosity, their road trips triggered massive fanfare, ticket sellouts, and cultural pandemonium wherever they played, which had not occurred before then with any other NBA team.

=== Seattle SuperSonics ===
The SuperSonics were led by Gary Payton and Shawn Kemp, with George Karl as head coach. The team was considered a perennial title contender throughout the mid-1990s, but the closest they came to reaching the finals was in 1993, when they lost to the Phoenix Suns in seven games in the Western Conference finals.

Two straight first-round exits followed, including the stunning 1994 loss to the eighth-seeded Denver Nuggets (the Sonics were the first seed in that playoffs). Motivated by a successive string of early playoff losses, Seattle finished the 1996 regular season with a franchise-record 64 wins.

Seattle began its playoff run with a four-game win over the Sacramento Kings, followed by a dominant sweep of the defending champion Houston Rockets, headed by a 33-point win in Game 1 where they held Hakeem Olajuwon to 5 points. They then beat the Utah Jazz in seven games in the western finals to advance to its first NBA championship round since 1979.

=== Road to the Finals ===
| Seattle SuperSonics (Western Conference champion) | | Chicago Bulls (Eastern Conference champion) |
|---|---|---|
| Western Conference: # / Team / W / L / PCT / GB / GP; 1 / c-Seattle SuperSonics * / 64 / 18 / .780 / – / 82; 2 / y-San Antonio Spurs * / 59 / 23 / .720 / 5 / 82; 3 / x-Utah Jazz / 55 / 27 / .671 / 9 / 82; 4 / x-Los Angeles Lakers / 53 / 29 / .646 / 11 / 82; 5 / x-Houston Rockets / 48 / 34 / .585 / 16 / 82; 6 / x-Portland Trail Blazers / 44 / 38 / .537 / 20 / 82; 7 / x-Phoenix Suns / 41 / 41 / .500 / 23 / 82; 8 / x-Sacramento Kings / 39 / 43 / .476 / 25 / 82; 9 / Golden State Warriors / 36 / 46 / .439 / 28 / 82; 10 / Denver Nuggets / 35 / 47 / .427 / 29 / 82; 11 / Los Angeles Clippers / 29 / 53 / .354 / 35 / 82; 12 / Minnesota Timberwolves / 26 / 56 / .317 / 38 / 82; 13 / Dallas Mavericks / 26 / 56 / .317 / 38 / 82; 14 / Vancouver Grizzlies / 15 / 67 / .183 / 49 / 82; 1st seed in the West, 2nd best league record | Regular season | Eastern Conference: # / Team / W / L / PCT / GB / GP; 1 / z–Chicago Bulls / 72 / 10 / .878 / – / 82; 2 / y–Orlando Magic / 60 / 22 / .732 / 12.0 / 82; 3 / x–Indiana Pacers / 52 / 30 / .634 / 20.0 / 82; 4 / x–Cleveland Cavaliers / 47 / 35 / .573 / 25.0 / 82; 5 / x–New York Knicks / 47 / 35 / .573 / 25.0 / 82; 6 / x–Atlanta Hawks / 46 / 36 / .561 / 26.0 / 82; 7 / x–Detroit Pistons / 46 / 36 / .561 / 26.0 / 82; 8 / x–Miami Heat / 42 / 40 / .512 / 30.0 / 82; 9 / Charlotte Hornets / 41 / 41 / .500 / 31.0 / 82; 10 / Washington Bullets / 39 / 43 / .476 / 33.0 / 82; 11 / Boston Celtics / 33 / 49 / .402 / 39.0 / 82; 12 / New Jersey Nets / 30 / 52 / .366 / 42.0 / 82; 13 / Milwaukee Bucks / 25 / 57 / .305 / 47.0 / 82; 14 / Toronto Raptors / 21 / 61 / .256 / 51.0 / 82; 15 / Philadelphia 76ers / 18 / 64 / .220 / 54.0 / 82; 1st seed in the East, best league record |
| Defeated the (8) Sacramento Kings, 3–1 | First round | Defeated the (8) Miami Heat, 3–0 |
| Defeated the (5) Houston Rockets, 4–0 | Conference semifinals | Defeated the (5) New York Knicks, 4–1 |
| Defeated the (3) Utah Jazz, 4–3 | Conference finals | Defeated the (2) Orlando Magic, 4–0 |

=== Regular season series ===
The teams split their two meetings, each game won by the home team:

November 26, 1995

Chicago Bulls 92, Seattle SuperSonics 97

KeyArena, Seattle, Washington

January 10, 1996

Seattle SuperSonics 87, Chicago Bulls 113

United Center, Chicago, Illinois

As Chicago went on to break the win-loss record with 72 wins and just 10 losses, the SuperSonics were one of nine teams to defeat the Bulls in the regular-season on November 26, 1995, in Seattle (Indiana defeated Chicago twice). In the game, Gary Payton stole the ball from Jordan with 20 seconds left in the game, with Seattle up, 94–92. Sam Perkins and Detlef Schrempf added free throws in the remaining seconds that iced the game.

== 1996 NBA Finals rosters ==
=== Chicago Bulls ===
1995–96 Chicago Bulls roster
Players

| Pos. | No. | Player | Height | Weight | DOB | From |
|---|---|---|---|---|---|---|
| G | 0 | Randy Brown | 6 ft 2 in (1.88 m) | 190 lb (86 kg) | 1968–05–22 | New Mexico State |
| G/F | 30 | Jud Buechler | 6 ft 6 in (1.98 m) | 220 lb (100 kg) | 1968–06–19 | Arizona |
| F | 35 | Jason Caffey | 6 ft 8 in (2.03 m) | 255 lb (116 kg) | 1973–06–12 | Alabama |
| C | 53 | James Edwards | 7 ft 0 in (2.13 m) | 225 lb (102 kg) | 1955–11–22 | Washington |
| F | 54 | Jack Haley | 6 ft 10 in (2.08 m) | 240 lb (109 kg) | 1964–01–27 | UCLA |
| G | 9 | Ron Harper | 6 ft 6 in (1.98 m) | 185 lb (84 kg) | 1964–01–20 | Miami (OH) |
| G | 23 | Michael Jordan | 6 ft 6 in (1.98 m) | 215 lb (98 kg) | 1963–02–17 | North Carolina |
| G | 25 | Steve Kerr | 6 ft 3 in (1.91 m) | 175 lb (79 kg) | 1965–09–27 | Arizona |
| F | 7 | Toni Kukoc | 6 ft 11 in (2.11 m) | 220 lb (100 kg) | 1968–09–18 | Croatia |
| C | 13 | Luc Longley | 7 ft 2 in (2.18 m) | 265 lb (120 kg) | 1969–01–19 | New Mexico |
| F | 33 | Scottie Pippen | 6 ft 8 in (2.03 m) | 218 lb (99 kg) | 1965–09–25 | Central Arkansas |
| F | 91 | Dennis Rodman | 6 ft 6 in (1.98 m) | 220 lb (100 kg) | 1961–05–13 | SE Oklahoma State |
| F | 22 | John Salley | 6 ft 11 in (2.11 m) | 230 lb (104 kg) | 1964–05–16 | Georgia Tech |
| F | 8 | Dickey Simpkins | 6 ft 9 in (2.06 m) | 248 lb (112 kg) | 1972–04–06 | Providence |
| C | 34 | Bill Wennington | 7 ft 0 in (2.13 m) | 245 lb (111 kg) | 1963–04–26 | St. John's |

Coaches
Head coach
- Phil Jackson
Assistant(s)
- Jim Cleamons
- Jim Rodgers
- John Paxson
- Tex Winter

Legend
- (DP) Unsigned draft pick
- (FA) Free agent
- (S) Suspended
- Injured

=== Seattle SuperSonics ===
1995–96 Seattle SuperSonics roster
Players

| Pos. | No. | Player | Height | Weight | DOB | From |
|---|---|---|---|---|---|---|
| G/F | 2 | Vincent Askew | 6 ft 6 in (1.98 m) | 210 lb (95 kg) | 1966–02–28 | Memphis |
| F/C | 34 | Frank Brickowski | 6 ft 9 in (2.06 m) | 240 lb (109 kg) | 1959–08–14 | Penn State |
| F | 1 | Sherell Ford | 6 ft 7 in (2.01 m) | 210 lb (95 kg) | 1972–08–26 | UIC |
| G | 33 | Hersey Hawkins | 6 ft 3 in (1.91 m) | 190 lb (86 kg) | 1966–09–29 | Bradley |
| C | 50 | Ervin Johnson | 6 ft 11 in (2.11 m) | 245 lb (111 kg) | 1967–12–21 | LSU New Orleans |
| F/C | 40 | Shawn Kemp | 6 ft 10 in (2.08 m) | 230 lb (104 kg) | 1969–11–26 | Trinity Valley CC |
| G/F | 10 | Nate McMillan | 6 ft 5 in (1.96 m) | 195 lb (88 kg) | 1964–08–03 | NC State |
| G | 20 | Gary Payton | 6 ft 4 in (1.93 m) | 180 lb (82 kg) | 1968–07–23 | Oregon State |
| F/C | 14 | Sam Perkins | 6 ft 9 in (2.06 m) | 235 lb (107 kg) | 1961–06–14 | North Carolina |
| F/C | 55 | Steve Scheffler | 6 ft 9 in (2.06 m) | 250 lb (113 kg) | 1967–09–03 | Purdue |
| F/C | 11 | Detlef Schrempf | 6 ft 9 in (2.06 m) | 214 lb (97 kg) | 1963–01–21 | Washington |
| G | 3 | Eric Snow | 6 ft 3 in (1.91 m) | 190 lb (86 kg) | 1973–04–04 | Michigan State |
| G/F | 25 | David Wingate | 6 ft 5 in (1.96 m) | 185 lb (84 kg) | 1963–12–15 | Georgetown |

Coaches
Head coach
- George Karl
Assistant(s)
- Dwane Casey
- Tim Grgurich
- Terry Stotts
- Bob Weiss

Legend
- (DP) Unsigned draft pick
- (FA) Free agent
- (S) Suspended
- Injured

== Series summary ==
| Game | Date | Road team | Result | Home team |
|---|---|---|---|---|
| Game 1 | June 5 | Seattle SuperSonics | 90–107 (0–1) | Chicago Bulls |
| Game 2 | June 7 | Seattle SuperSonics | 88–92 (0–2) | Chicago Bulls |
| Game 3 | June 9 | Chicago Bulls | 108–86 (3–0) | Seattle SuperSonics |
| Game 4 | June 12 | Chicago Bulls | 86–107 (3–1) | Seattle SuperSonics |
| Game 5 | June 14 | Chicago Bulls | 78–89 (3–2) | Seattle SuperSonics |
| Game 6 | June 16 | Seattle SuperSonics | 75–87 (2–4) | Chicago Bulls |

All times are in Eastern Daylight Time (UTC−4).

=== Game 1 ===
NBC

June 5
9:00 et

Recap at the Wayback Machine (archived October 27, 1996)

Seattle SuperSonics 90, Chicago Bulls 107
Scoring by quarter: 18–24, 30–29, 29–26, 13–28
| Pts: Shawn Kemp 32; Rebs: Gary Payton 10; Asts: Gary Payton 6 | Pts: Michael Jordan 28; Rebs: Dennis Rodman 13; Asts: Ron Harper 7 |
Chicago leads the series, 1–0

United Center, Chicago, Illinois
Attendance: 24,544
Referees:
- No. 43 Danny Crawford
- No. 17 Joey Crawford
- No. 15 Bennett Salvatore

Although Chicago was not playing well offensively, they were able to compensate with superb defense. Frustration set in for Seattle when Frank Brickowski was ejected after committing a flagrant foul against Dennis Rodman, then promptly getting charged with two consecutive technical fouls. Chicago was leading by only 2 at the end of the third quarter, but in the final quarter, shots by Toni Kukoč and 2 key steals by Ron Harper clinched the Bulls' Game 1 win. Shawn Kemp was a bright spot for Seattle, scoring 32 points, but ended up fouling out midway through the fourth quarter. Michael Jordan led the way for the Bulls with 28 points, while Scottie Pippen chipped in with 21 points. Seattle captain Nate McMillan ended up leaving the game due to a debilitating back injury in the 2nd quarter. Dennis Rodman pulled down 13 rebounds for the Bulls, while Toni Kukoč chipped in off the bench with 18 points.

=== Game 2 ===
NBC

June 7
9:00 et

Recap at the Wayback Machine (archived October 27, 1996)

Seattle SuperSonics 88, Chicago Bulls 92
Scoring by quarter: 27–23, 18–23, 20–30, 23–16
| Pts: Shawn Kemp 29; Rebs: Shawn Kemp 13; Asts: Payton, Schrempf 3 each | Pts: Michael Jordan 29; Rebs: Dennis Rodman 20; Asts: Michael Jordan 8 |
Chicago leads the series, 2–0

United Center, Chicago, Illinois
Attendance: 24,544
Referees:
- No. 42 Hue Hollins
- No. 20 Jess Kersey
- No. 4 Ed T. Rush

Game 2 started well for Seattle with a 27–23 first quarter lead. However, Seattle would once again lose the lead before halftime. Despite Shawn Kemp's 29 points and 13 rebounds, Chicago triumphed with a final score of 92 to 88. In the victory, Dennis Rodman tied an NBA Finals record with 11 offensive rebounds and made a clutch free throw near the end of the game to seal the Bulls victory. Michael Jordan once again led the Bulls with 29 points, while Shawn Kemp continued his strong play by scoring 29 points for Seattle.

=== Game 3 ===
NBC

June 9
7:30 et

Recap at the Wayback Machine (archived October 27, 1996)

Chicago Bulls 108, Seattle SuperSonics 86
Scoring by quarter: 34–16, 28–22, 13–23, 33–25
| Pts: Michael Jordan 36; Rebs: Dennis Rodman 10; Asts: Scottie Pippen 9 | Pts: Detlef Schrempf 20; Rebs: Brickowski, Payton 7 each Asts: Gary Payton 9 |
Chicago leads the series, 3–0

KeyArena, Seattle, Washington
Attendance: 17,072
Referees:
- No. 27 Dick Bavetta
- No. 25 Hugh Evans
- No. 29 Steve Javie

The Sonics, owners of a 44–5 home record (including playoffs), suffered a 22-point blow-out in their return to Seattle, giving the Bulls a seemingly insurmountable 3–0 series lead. Frustration would once again set in for the Sonics, as Frank Brickowski was ejected for committing a flagrant foul on Dennis Rodman. Michael Jordan led the way for the Bulls with 36 points.

=== Game 4 ===
NBC

June 12
9:00 et

Recap at the Wayback Machine (archived October 27, 1996)

Chicago Bulls 86, Seattle SuperSonics 107
Scoring by quarter: 21–25, 11–28, 31–31, 23–23
| Pts: Michael Jordan 23; Rebs: Dennis Rodman 14; Asts: Scottie Pippen 8 | Pts: Shawn Kemp 25; Rebs: Shawn Kemp 11; Asts: Gary Payton 11 |
Chicago leads the series, 3–1

KeyArena, Seattle, Washington
Attendance: 17,072
Referees:
- No. 17 Joey Crawford
- No. 13 Mike Mathis
- No. 21 Bill Oakes

Seattle did not want to suffer the ignominy of a sweep. In an attempt to spark his team, Coach George Karl gave Jordan's defensive assignment to Gary Payton, a move which showed immediate results. Seattle succeeded with a 107–86 win over the Bulls, and Sonics fans taunted the Bulls players with homemade signs reading "Sweepless in Seattle". The Sonics were helped by the return of team captain Nate McMillan whose presence entering the game brought the KeyArena crowd to its feet.

Seattle's victory prevented the NBA Finals from being swept in two consecutive years (something which, as of 2026, has never occurred).

=== Game 5 ===
NBC

June 14
9:00 et

Recap at the Wayback Machine (archived October 27, 1996)

Chicago Bulls 78, Seattle SuperSonics 89
Scoring by quarter: 18–18, 24–25, 18–19, 18–27
| Pts: Michael Jordan 26; Rebs: Dennis Rodman 12; Asts: Scottie Pippen 5 | Pts: Gary Payton 23; Rebs: Shawn Kemp 10; Asts: Gary Payton 6 |
Chicago leads the series, 3–2

KeyArena, Seattle, Washington
Attendance: 17,072
Referees:
- No. 42 Hue Hollins
- No. 20 Jess Kersey
- No. 4 Ed T. Rush

Seattle would once again deny the Bulls the championship, stretching the series to six games. Payton had this to say: "We feel great. We knew we could play with this team. It just took too long. We should have come with this a little earlier." Shawn Kemp's performance in this game was considered by many to be his best in a Seattle uniform.

This game marked the last NBA Finals game played in Seattle.

=== Game 6 ===
NBC

June 16
7:30 pm

Recap at the Wayback Machine (archived October 27, 1996)

Seattle SuperSonics 75, Chicago Bulls 87
Scoring by quarter: 18–24, 20–21, 20–22, 17–20
| Pts: Detlef Schrempf 23; Rebs: Shawn Kemp 14; Asts: Gary Payton 7 | Pts: Michael Jordan 22; Rebs: Dennis Rodman 19; Asts: Michael Jordan 7 |
Chicago wins the NBA Finals, 4–2

United Center, Chicago, Illinois
Attendance: 24,544
Referees:
- No. 27 Dick Bavetta
- No. 25 Hugh Evans
- No. 29 Steve Javie

Chicago won the series four games to two on Father's Day, in what would be the last time the Sonics played a Finals game before relocating to Oklahoma City and being renamed the Thunder. The Bulls' victory was partly due to the stellar performance of power forward Dennis Rodman, who delivered a repeat of his Game 2 performance with 19 rebounds, tying his own NBA Finals record. Bulls star Michael Jordan finished the game with 22 points and collected his fourth Finals MVP. An emotional Jordan clutched the game ball and broke down sobbing on the locker room floor, dedicating the win to his father, who was murdered in 1993. It was Jordan's first title without his father present.

As of the conclusion of the 2026 playoffs, no NBA team has ever overcome a 3–0 playoff series deficit, and only four teams have forced a Game 7 after losing the first three contests: the New York Knicks (1951), Denver Nuggets (1994), Portland Trail Blazers (2003), and Boston Celtics (2023). Sixteen teams, including the Sonics, have managed to extend a 3–0 series to a Game 6.

== Player statistics ==
Legend
| GP | Games played | GS | Games started | MPG | Minutes per game |
| FG% | Field-goal percentage | 3P% | 3-point field-goal percentage | FT% | Free-throw percentage |
| RPG | Rebounds per game | APG | Assists per game | SPG | Steals per game |
| BPG | Blocks per game | PPG | Points per game |

Chicago Bulls

Chicago Bulls statistics
| Player | GP | GS | MPG | FG% | 3P% | FT% | RPG | APG | SPG | BPG | PPG |
|---|---|---|---|---|---|---|---|---|---|---|---|
| Randy Brown | 6 | 0 | 8.2 | .500 | .500 | .500 | 0.3 | 0.9 | 0.7 | 0.0 | 2.8 |
| Jud Buechler | 6 | 0 | 5.6 | .222 | .000 | .000 | 0.0 | 0.2 | 0.7 | 0.0 | 0.7 |
| Ron Harper | 6 | 4 | 19.3 | .375 | .308 | .917 | 2.3 | 1.7 | 0.7 | 0.3 | 6.5 |
| Michael Jordan | 6 | 6 | 42.0 | .415 | .316 | .836 | 5.3 | 4.2 | 1.7 | 0.2 | 27.3 |
| Steve Kerr | 6 | 0 | 18.8 | .303 | .182 | .857 | 0.9 | 0.8 | 0.2 | 0.0 | 5.0 |
| Toni Kukoč | 6 | 2 | 29.5 | .423 | .313 | .800 | 4.8 | 3.5 | 0.8 | 0.3 | 13.0 |
| Luc Longley | 6 | 6 | 28.3 | .574 | .000 | .727 | 3.8 | 2.2 | 0.6 | 1.8 | 11.7 |
| Scottie Pippen | 6 | 6 | 41.3 | .343 | .231 | .708 | 8.2 | 5.3 | 2.3 | 1.3 | 15.7 |
| Dennis Rodman | 6 | 6 | 37.5 | .486 | .000 | .579 | 14.7 | 2.5 | 0.8 | 0.2 | 7.5 |
| John Salley | 5 | 0 | 3.0 | .000 | .000 | .000 | 0.2 | 0.4 | 0.0 | 0.0 | 0.0 |
| Bill Wennington | 6 | 0 | 7.0 | .667 | .000 | .500 | 0.5 | 0.2 | 0.0 | 0.0 | 2.9 |

Seattle SuperSonics

Seattle SuperSonics statistics
| Player | GP | GS | MPG | FG% | 3P% | FT% | RPG | APG | SPG | BPG | PPG |
|---|---|---|---|---|---|---|---|---|---|---|---|
| Vincent Askew | 4 | 0 | 15.5 | .222 | .200 | 1.000 | 2.5 | 0.5 | 0.5 | 0.0 | 1.8 |
| Frank Brickowski | 6 | 3 | 11.3 | .222 | .200 | .000 | 2.0 | 0.5 | 0.2 | 0.2 | 0.8 |
| Hersey Hawkins | 6 | 6 | 38.3 | .455 | .273 | .923 | 3.5 | 1.0 | 1.2 | 0.2 | 13.3 |
| Ervin Johnson | 3 | 3 | 6.7 | .333 | .000 | .000 | 2.3 | 0.3 | 0.3 | 0.3 | 1.3 |
| Shawn Kemp | 6 | 6 | 40.3 | .551 | .000 | .857 | 10.0 | 2.2 | 1.3 | 2.0 | 23.3 |
| Nate McMillan | 4 | 0 | 12.8 | .429 | .600 | 1.000 | 2.8 | 1.5 | 0.5 | 0.0 | 2.8 |
| Gary Payton | 6 | 6 | 45.7 | .444 | .333 | .731 | 6.3 | 7.0 | 1.5 | 0.0 | 18.0 |
| Sam Perkins | 6 | 0 | 31.7 | .377 | .235 | .810 | 4.7 | 2.0 | 0.5 | 0.0 | 11.2 |
| Steve Scheffler | 4 | 0 | 2.0 | .000 | .000 | .000 | 0.5 | 0.0 | 0.0 | 0.0 | 0.0 |
| Detlef Schrempf | 6 | 6 | 39.7 | .443 | .389 | .875 | 5.0 | 2.5 | 0.5 | 0.2 | 16.3 |
| Eric Snow | 6 | 0 | 1.5 | .000 | .000 | .000 | 0.3 | 0.2 | 0.0 | 0.0 | 0.0 |
| David Wingate | 6 | 0 | 8.0 | .500 | .500 | 1.000 | 0.3 | 0.0 | 0.0 | 0.0 | 2.5 |

== Broadcasting ==
The Finals was aired in the United States on NBC. Bob Costas hosted the pre-game, halftime and post-game show with analysts Julius Erving and Peter Vecsey. Games were called by Marv Albert, Matt Guokas and Bill Walton, while Ahmad Rashad and Hannah Storm served as sideline reporters.

The local NBC stations of the participants were WMAQ-TV (Chicago) and KING-TV (Seattle).

== Aftermath ==
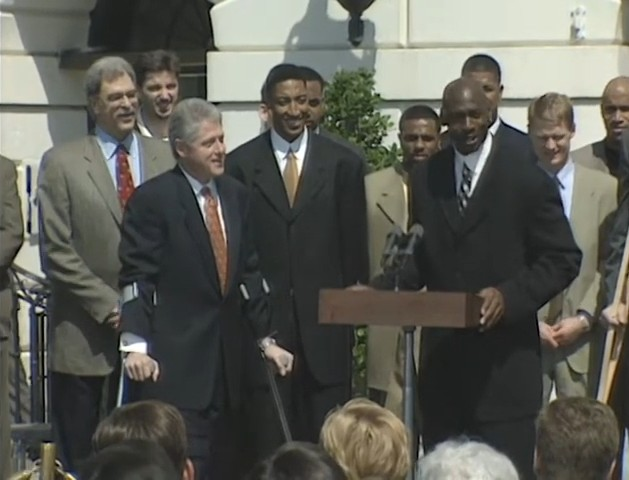
1996 Chicago Bulls in 1997 during their White House visit with President Bill Clinton

This was the SuperSonics’ last Finals appearance during their time in Seattle, as the team moved to Oklahoma City in 2008 and became the Oklahoma City Thunder. They would make the finals four years later after the move, losing to the Big Three-led Miami Heat in five games. In 2025, the Thunder won their second championship over the Indiana Pacers in seven games. This was George Karl's only Finals appearance in his entire 27-seasons as an NBA head coach.

The Bulls came close to winning 70 games for the second straight year, but lost three of their last four games and instead settled for a 69-win campaign in 1997. Nonetheless, the Bulls repeated as champions, defeating the Karl Malone and John Stockton-led Utah Jazz in six games in the first of two finals matches between Chicago and Utah. In the off-season that preceded Scottie Pippen became the first person to win the NBA championship and an Olympic gold medal in the same year twice, playing for Team USA at the Atlanta Olympics.

The Bulls' combined 87 wins in the regular season and postseason would stand as an NBA record until the 2015–16 Golden State Warriors, coached by former Bull Steve Kerr, broke it with 88 total wins (thanks to the first round using a best-of-7 format instead of the best-of-5 in 1996), including a 73–9 regular season mark. However, the Warriors lost to the Cleveland Cavaliers in the 2016 NBA Finals, failing to repeat as champions after beating the same Cavaliers in the previous Finals.

This was the first NBA Finals to feature a Larry O'Brien Championship Trophy patch on each team's uniforms. This would continue until the 2009 NBA Finals, though from 1998 to 2001, the uniform patch was of the NBA Finals logo itself. Starting with the 2010 NBA Finals, the patch would switch to a gold basketball containing the NBA logo and the Finals logo inside; this replaced the regular NBA logo on the team's uniforms.

== See also ==
- 1996 NBA playoffs
- The Last Dance (miniseries)
