= Sam Mitchell (basketball) =

American basketball player and coach (born 1963)

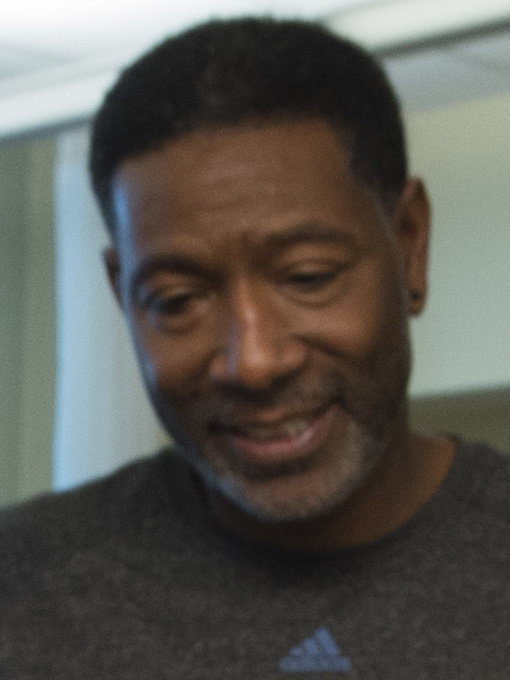
- Mitchell with the Minnesota Timberwolves in 2014

Personal information
- Born: September 2, 1963 (age 63) Columbus, Georgia, U.S.
- Listed height: 6 ft 6 in (1.98 m)
- Listed weight: 210 lb (95 kg)

Career information
- High school: Columbus (Columbus, Georgia)
- College: Mercer (1981–1985)
- NBA draft: 1985: 3rd round, 54th overall pick
- Drafted by: Houston Rockets
- Playing career: 1985–2002
- Position: Small forward
- Number: 42, 5
- Coaching career: 2002–2019

Career history

Playing
- 1985–1986: Wisconsin Flyers
- 1986: Tampa Bay Flash
- 1986–1987: Rapid City Thrillers
- 1987–1989: Montpellier
- 1989–1992: Minnesota Timberwolves
- 1992–1995: Indiana Pacers
- 1995–2002: Minnesota Timberwolves

Coaching
- 2002–2004: Milwaukee Bucks (assistant)
- 2004–2008: Toronto Raptors
- 2010–2012: New Jersey Nets (assistant)
- 2014–2015: Minnesota Timberwolves (assistant)
- 2015–2016: Minnesota Timberwolves (interim)
- 2018–2019: Memphis (assistant)

Career highlights
- As player: CBA champion (1987); TAAC Player of the Year (1985); 2× First-team All-TAAC (1984, 1985); No. 42 retired by Mercer Bears; As coach: NBA Coach of the Year (2007)

Career NBA statistics
- Points: 8,636 (8.7 ppg)
- Rebounds: 3,711 (3.7 rpg)
- Assists: 1,089 (1.1 apg)
- Stats at NBA.com
- Stats at Basketball Reference

Samuel E. Mitchell Jr. (born September 2, 1963) is an American former professional basketball player and coach. Playing at small forward, Mitchell's 18-year professional basketball career spanned three decades, and was most notable for his ten seasons with the NBA's Minnesota Timberwolves, whom he also coached as an interim for the 2015–16 season. Mitchell coached for the Toronto Raptors from 2004 to 2008 as well, winning Coach of the Year Award in 2007.

Mitchell has since worked as an analyst for TSN, NBA TV, and works as a talk show co-host/analyst on SiriusXM NBA Radio.

== Early years ==
Mitchell graduated from Columbus High School in 1981. He spent the next four years playing college basketball at Mercer University (1981–85), and scored nearly 2,000 points, becoming the leading scorer in Bears history. He led the team to both the regular-season and postseason Trans American Atlantic Conference championships in 1985. Averaging 25 points and 8.2 rebounds per game as a senior, Mitchell led the Bears to just their second NCAA tournament in team history in 1985; they would not return for nearly 30 years, until the 2014 tournament.

Mitchell had enlisted in the Army during his junior year, and at the conclusion of the 1985 NCAA tournament he went to boot camp at Fort Bragg, North Carolina. He left one month later when he was drafted by the Houston Rockets with the 7th pick of the 3rd round (54th overall) in the 1985 NBA draft. However, he was cut during final cuts and joined the Wisconsin Flyers of the Continental Basketball Association (CBA).

Unhappy in the CBA, Mitchell quit the team midway through the season to return home to Georgia, where a former professor hired him a special education teacher for the remainder of the school year. With his summer off, he tried out for the U.S. Basketball League, and joined the Tampa Bay Flash, who he helped lead to the league title. He rejoined the Rockets for training camp afterwards, but was once again cut and joined the CBA, splitting the season between the Wisconsin Flyers and Rapid City Thrillers. He won a CBA championship with the Thrillers in 1987. He then joined the French LNB Pro A team of Montpellier Basket (coached by Pierre Galle) for the end of the 1987–88 and the whole 1988–89 season.

Success overseas led to a renewed interest from the NBA, and Mitchell earned a contract with the newly-formed Minnesota Timberwolves. As a 26-year-old rookie, Mitchell averaged 17.3 points per game in his first 28 appearances while finishing the year at 12.7 per night. He spent three years in Minnesota, before being traded to the Indiana Pacers. While having a smaller role with the Pacers than he did with the Timberwolves, Mitchell did help Indiana reach the Eastern Conference Finals in 1994–95. Following that season, he returned to Minnesota. Future All-Star Kevin Garnett was drafted by the Timberwolves out of high school that year, and Mitchell has been credited with helping Garnett's development. Mitchell retired from the league following the 2001–02 season.

== Coaching career ==
Mitchell returned to the NBA almost immediately after his retirement as an assistant coach with the Milwaukee Bucks for two seasons until 2004. He then briefly became a part of the expansion Charlotte Bobcats as their top assistant coach.

Mitchell moved on to the Toronto Raptors when he was named as the sixth head coach in Raptors history after incumbent Kevin O'Neill was fired.

Mitchell was named the coach of the month in January 2007 for his effort bringing the Toronto Raptors back to .500 and leading the Atlantic Division. On March 30, 2007, Mitchell got his 100th win as NBA coach when the Raptors defeated the Washington Wizards at the Verizon Center.

Mitchell, who witnessed his team struggle with rebuilding in his first years as coach, also led the Toronto Raptors to their first division title in franchise history as the team won the Atlantic Division in the NBA's Eastern Conference in the 2006–07 season. On April 24, 2007, he was named 2006–07 NBA Coach of the Year. On May 22, 2007, after leading the Raptors to their first playoffs appearance since 2002, and after much speculation, Mitchell was signed to a four-year contract with the Raptors.

On November 25, 2007, Mitchell surpassed Lenny Wilkens for the most wins in team history. Mitchell was the longest reigning head coach of the Toronto Raptors.

On December 3, 2008, after leading the Raptors to a disappointing 8–9 start to the 2008–09 season, Mitchell was relieved of his duties as the team's head coach. Assistant coach Jay Triano took over the position of interim head coach of the Raptors, which later made him the first foreign-born player to coach a team in the NBA. The firing was ridiculed by the TNT Overtime crew because the Raptors were only one game under .500 at the time of the firing. Chris Webber predicted that they would not be "as good under another coach." In fact, the Raptors went 25–40 the rest of the season.

Mitchell was hired as an assistant coach by the New Jersey Nets on July 19, 2010. On December 6, 2011, Nets hired P.J. Carlesimo and Mario Elie as new assistant coaches and Mitchell was reassigned to a scouting position.

On 2012, Sam Mitchell named head coach of USA select to 2012 William Jones Cup in Taiwan and his team finished bronze medal.

On June 16, 2014, Mitchell was hired as an assistant coach by the Minnesota Timberwolves.

On September 11, 2015, Mitchell became the Timberwolves' interim head coach after Flip Saunders had to take a leave of absence to receive treatment after being diagnosed with Hodgkin lymphoma. On October 25, 2015, Saunders died at age 60. For the rest of the season, Mitchell became the official head coach, although he would still be treated as an interim coach. During his sole season coaching the Timberwolves, he would coach them to the fifth-worst record in the league with a 29–53 record.

On April 13, 2016, Mitchell was relieved of his interim head coaching duties as the coach of the Timberwolves after the last game of the season, allowing them to look for a permanent coach. He would then be replaced by former Chicago Bulls head coach Tom Thibodeau.

On June 13, 2018, Mitchell was hired by the University of Memphis as assistant coach under Penny Hardaway.

After one year as one of Memphis's assistant coaches, Sam Mitchell left the program.

== Media career ==
Mitchell has since worked as an analyst on NBA TV.

Mitchell was involved in an incident with co-host Chris Miles during the preseason in October 2024, where Mitchell appeared to take an apparent humorous comment from Miles regarding the two's salary personally and began making remarks about Miles' own pay and properties. Mitchell subsequently doxxed the anchor's apparent home address in Florida while Miles attempted to go to commercial.

== NBA career statistics ==
Legend
| GP | Games played | GS | Games started | MPG | Minutes per game |
| FG% | Field goal percentage | 3P% | 3-point field goal percentage | FT% | Free throw percentage |
| RPG | Rebounds per game | APG | Assists per game | SPG | Steals per game |
| BPG | Blocks per game | PPG | Points per game | **Bold** | Career high |
| * | Led the league |

=== Regular season ===
| Year | Team | GP | GS | MPG | FG% | 3P% | FT% | RPG | APG | SPG | BPG | PPG |
|---|---|---|---|---|---|---|---|---|---|---|---|---|
| 1989–90 | Minnesota | 80 | 30 | 30.2 | .446 | .000 | .768 | 5.8 | 1.1 | **.8** | **.7** | 12.7 |
| 1990–91 | Minnesota | **82** | 60 | **38.1** | .441 | .000 | .775 | **6.3** | 1.6 | **.8** | **.7** | **14.6** |
| 1991–92 | Minnesota | **82** | **63** | 26.2 | .423 | .182 | .786 | 5.8 | 1.1 | .6 | .5 | 10.1 |
| 1992–93 | Indiana | 81 | 1 | 17.3 | .445 | .174 | .811 | 3.1 | .9 | .3 | .1 | 7.2 |
| 1993–94 | Indiana | 75 | 18 | 14.5 | .458 | .000 | .745 | 2.5 | .9 | .4 | .1 | 4.8 |
| 1994–95 | Indiana | 81 | 12 | 17.0 | .487 | .100 | .724 | 3.0 | .8 | .5 | .2 | 6.5 |
| 1995–96 | Minnesota | 78 | 42 | 27.5 | **.490** | .056 | .814 | 4.3 | .9 | .6 | .3 | 10.8 |
| 1996–97 | Minnesota | **82** | 5 | 25.0 | .446 | .160 | .759 | 4.0 | 1.0 | .6 | .2 | 9.3 |
| 1997–98 | Minnesota | 81 | 33 | 27.6 | .464 | **.349** | **.832** | 4.8 | 1.3 | **.8** | .3 | 12.3 |
| 1998–99 | Minnesota | 50* | 20 | 26.9 | .408 | .237 | .764 | 3.6 | **2.0** | .7 | .3 | 11.2 |
| 1999–00 | Minnesota | 66 | 24 | 18.6 | .447 | .237 | .764 | 2.1 | 1.7 | .4 | .2 | 6.5 |
| 2000–01 | Minnesota | **82** | 4 | 12.0 | .408 | .209 | .727 | 1.5 | .7 | .3 | .1 | 3.5 |
| 2001–02 | Minnesota | 74 | 10 | 9.8 | .432 | .286 | .776 | 1.1 | .6 | .2 | .1 | 3.3 |
| Career | | 994 | 322 | 22.4 | .447 | .223 | .784 | 3.7 | 1.1 | .6 | .3 | 8.7 |

=== Playoffs ===
| Year | Team | GP | GS | MPG | FG% | 3P% | FT% | RPG | APG | SPG | BPG | PPG |
|---|---|---|---|---|---|---|---|---|---|---|---|---|
| 1993 | Indiana | 4 | 0 | 6.3 | **.625** | – | **1.000** | .3 | .0 | .0 | .0 | 3.0 |
| 1994 | Indiana | 15 | 0 | 6.6 | .346 | .000 | .750 | 1.1 | .3 | .1 | .1 | 1.4 |
| 1995 | Indiana | **17** | 0 | 13.1 | .359 | .000 | .786 | 2.8 | .4 | .2 | .1 | 4.0 |
| 1997 | Minnesota | 3 | 0 | 15.7 | .462 | – | .625 | 2.3 | .3 | **.3** | .3 | 5.7 |
| 1998 | Minnesota | 5 | **5** | **35.4** | .448 | .214 | .895 | **5.4** | **1.6** | .2 | .2 | **14.4** |
| 1999 | Minnesota | 4 | 1 | 32.8 | .375 | .167 | .750 | 3.5 | 1.5 | **.3** | **.5** | 10.0 |
| 2000 | Minnesota | 4 | 0 | 17.0 | .500 | **.400** | **1.000** | 1.8 | .5 | .0 | .3 | 5.8 |
| 2001 | Minnesota | 4 | 0 | 12.5 | .200 | .000 | **1.000** | 1.8 | .8 | **.3** | .0 | 1.5 |
| 2002 | Minnesota | 3 | 2 | 11.5 | .333 | – | **1.000** | .7 | 1.0 | **.3** | .3 | 2.7 |
| Career | | 59 | 8 | 14.5 | .398 | .207 | .813 | 2.2 | .6 | .2 | .2 | 4.5 |

== Head coaching record ==
Legend
| Regular season | G | Games coached | W | Games won | L | Games lost | W–L % | Win–loss % |
| Playoffs | PG | Playoff games | PW | Playoff wins | PL | Playoff losses | PW–L % | Playoff win–loss % |

| Team | Year | G | W | L | W–L% | Finish | PG | PW | PL | PW–L% | Result |
|---|---|---|---|---|---|---|---|---|---|---|---|
| Toronto | 2004–05 | 82 | 33 | 49 | .402 | 4th in Atlantic | — | — | — | — | Missed playoffs |
| Toronto | 2005–06 | 82 | 27 | 55 | .329 | 4th in Atlantic | — | — | — | — | Missed playoffs |
| Toronto | 2006–07 | 82 | 47 | 35 | .573 | 1st in Atlantic | 6 | 2 | 4 | .333 | Lost in First Round |
| Toronto | 2007–08 | 82 | 41 | 41 | .500 | 2nd in Atlantic | 5 | 1 | 4 | .200 | Lost in First Round |
| Toronto | 2008–09 | 17 | 8 | 9 | .471 | (fired) | — | — | — | — | — |
| Minnesota | 2015–16 | 82 | 29 | 53 | .354 | 5th in Northwest | — | — | — | — | Missed playoffs |
| Career | | 427 | 185 | 242 | .433 | | 11 | 3 | 8 | .273 | — |

== Personal life ==
Mitchell lives in Atlanta, Georgia with his wife, Dawn Session-Mitchell. Mitchell has four children from a previous marriage.

Mitchell's half-brother, Fessor Leonard, played basketball professionally in Europe.
