= 1993–94 Indiana Pacers season =

NBA professional basketball team season

- Head coach: Larry Brown
- General manager: Donnie Walsh
- Owner: Herbert Simon
- Arena: Market Square Arena

Results
- Record: 47–35 (.573)
- Place: Division: 3rd (Central); Conference: 5th (Eastern)
- Playoff finish: Eastern Conference finals (lost to Knicks 3–4)
- Stats at Basketball Reference

Local media
- Television: WTTV; Prime Sports Midwest
- Radio: WNDE

The 1993–94 Indiana Pacers season was the 18th season for the Indiana Pacers in the National Basketball Association, and their 27th season as a franchise.

== Season summary ==
=== Off-season ===
During the off-season, the Pacers hired Larry Brown as their new head coach, acquired Derrick McKey from the Seattle SuperSonics, and signed free agent Haywoode Workman, who previously played overseas in Italy. Rookie power forward Antonio Davis from the University of Texas-El Paso, who was drafted by the Pacers as the 45th overall pick in the 1990 NBA draft, but went to play overseas in Greece and Italy, made his debut in the NBA this season.

=== Regular season ===
Under Brown and with the addition of McKey, Workman and Antonio Davis, the Pacers struggled losing six of their first seven games of the regular season, and then later on posted a five-game losing streak in December, leading to a 10–16 start. In December, the team signed free agent Byron Scott, who won championships with the Los Angeles Lakers in the 1980s. However, the Pacers posted a seven-game winning streak between January and February, and held a 23–23 record at the All-Star break. With a 39–35 record as of April 8, 1994, the Pacers won their final eight games of the season, and finished in third place in the Central Division with a 47–35 record, earning the fifth seed in the Eastern Conference; the team qualified for the NBA playoffs for the fifth consecutive year.

Reggie Miller averaged 19.9 points and 1.5 steals per game, and led the Pacers with 123 three-point field goals, while Rik Smits averaged 15.7 points and 6.2 rebounds per game, and McKey provided the team with 12.0 points, 5.3 rebounds, 4.3 assists and 1.5 steals per game. In addition, Dale Davis averaged 11.7 points, 10.9 rebounds and 1.6 blocks per game, while Scott contributed 10.4 points per game off the bench as the team's sixth man, and Pooh Richardson provided with 10.0 points and 6.4 assists per game, but only played just 37 games due to calf and shoulder injuries. Meanwhile, Workman became the team's starting point guard in Richardson's absence, averaging 7.7 points and 6.2 assists per game, while off the bench, Antonio Davis averaged 7.7 points and 6.2 rebounds per game, second-year guard Malik Sealy contributed 6.6 points per game, but only played just 43 games due to injury, and Vern Fleming provided with 6.5 points and 3.1 assists per game.

During the NBA All-Star weekend at the Target Center in Minneapolis, Minnesota, Antonio Davis was selected for the inaugural NBA Rookie Game, as a member of the Phenoms team, and also participated in the NBA Slam Dunk Contest. Dale Davis finished tied in fourth place in Most Improved Player voting. The Pacers finished 23rd in the NBA in home-game attendance, with an attendance of 531,812 at the Market Square Arena during the regular season, which was the fifth-lowest in the league.

=== NBA playoffs ===
In the Eastern Conference First Round of the 1994 NBA playoffs, the Pacers faced off against the 4th–seeded Orlando Magic, a team that featured All-Star center Shaquille O'Neal, rookie point guard Penny Hardaway, and Nick Anderson. The Pacers won the first two games over the Magic on the road at the Orlando Arena, before winning Game 3 at home, 99–86 at the Market Square Arena to win the series in a three-game sweep; it was the first time that the Pacers won an NBA playoff series since joining the NBA.

In the Eastern Conference Semi-finals, the team faced off against the top–seeded, and Central Division champion Atlanta Hawks, who were led by Kevin Willis, All-Star forward Danny Manning, and All-Star guard Mookie Blaylock. With the series tied at 1–1, the Pacers won the next two games at the Market Square Arena, including a Game 4 win over the Hawks, 102–86 to take a 3–1 series lead. After losing Game 5 on the road, 88–76 at the Omni Coliseum, the Pacers won Game 6 over the Hawks at the Market Square Arena, 98–79 to win the series in six games, and advance to the Conference Finals for the first time in franchise history.

In the Eastern Conference Finals, and for the second consecutive year, the Pacers faced off against the 2nd–seeded, and Atlantic Division champion New York Knicks, who were led by the All-Star trio of Patrick Ewing, John Starks and Charles Oakley. The Knicks took a 2–0 series lead, but the Pacers managed to win the next two games at the Market Square Arena to even the series. In Game 5 at Madison Square Garden, Miller scored 25 points in the fourth quarter alone, and also mocked Knicks fan and film director Spike Lee in the process; Miller finished the game with 39 points and made 6 out of 11 three-point field-goal attempts, as the Pacers defeated the Knicks, 93–86 to take a 3–2 series lead. However, the Pacers lost the next two games, including a Game 7 loss to the Knicks at Madison Square Garden, 94–90, thus losing in a hard-fought seven-game series.

The Knicks would advance to the 1994 NBA Finals, but would lose to the Houston Rockets in a full seven-game series.

=== Aftermath ===
Following the season, Richardson and Sealy, who both did not participate in the NBA playoffs due to season-ending injuries, were both traded to the Los Angeles Clippers.

== Offseason ==
=== NBA draft ===
Round	Pick	Player	Position	Nationality	College
1	14	Scott Haskin	C	United States	Oregon St.
2	39	Thomas Hill	SG/SF	United States	Duke
2	51	Spencer Dunkley	C	England	Delaware

== Roster ==
1993–94 Indiana Pacers roster
Players

Pos.	No.	Player	Height	Weight	DOB	From
G	12	Lester Conner	6 ft 4 in (1.93 m)	180 lb (82 kg)	1959–09–17	Oregon State
F	33	Antonio Davis	6 ft 9 in (2.06 m)	215 lb (98 kg)	1968–10–31	UTEP
F	32	Dale Davis	6 ft 11 in (2.11 m)	230 lb (104 kg)	1969–03–25	Clemson
G	10	Vern Fleming	6 ft 5 in (1.96 m)	185 lb (84 kg)	1962–02–04	Georgia
C	43	Scott Haskin	6 ft 11 in (2.11 m)	250 lb (113 kg)	1970–09–19	Oregon State
F	9	Derrick McKey	6 ft 9 in (2.06 m)	205 lb (93 kg)	1966–10–10	Alabama
G	31	Reggie Miller	6 ft 7 in (2.01 m)	185 lb (84 kg)	1965–08–24	UCLA
F	5	Sam Mitchell	6 ft 6 in (1.98 m)	210 lb (95 kg)	1963–09–02	Mercer
F	23	Gerald Paddio	6 ft 7 in (2.01 m)	205 lb (93 kg)	1965–04–21	UNLV
G	24	Pooh Richardson	6 ft 1 in (1.85 m)	180 lb (82 kg)	1966–05–14	UCLA
G	4	Byron Scott	6 ft 3 in (1.91 m)	195 lb (88 kg)	1961–03–28	Arizona State
G	21	Malik Sealy	6 ft 8 in (2.03 m)	190 lb (86 kg)	1970–02–01	St. John's
C	45	Rik Smits	7 ft 4 in (2.24 m)	250 lb (113 kg)	1966–08–23	Marist
C	41	LaSalle Thompson	6 ft 10 in (2.08 m)	245 lb (111 kg)	1961–06–23	Texas
F	44	Kenny Williams	6 ft 9 in (2.06 m)	205 lb (93 kg)	1969–06–09	Elizabeth City State
G	3	Haywoode Workman	6 ft 2 in (1.88 m)	180 lb (82 kg)	1966–01–23	Oral Roberts

Coaches
Head coach
- Larry Brown
Assistant(s)
- Bill Blair
- Gar Heard
- George Irvine
- Billy King

Legend
- (DP) Unsigned draft pick
- (FA) Free agent
- (S) Suspended
- Injured

Roster

== Regular season ==
=== Season standings ===
Central Division	W	L	PCT	GB	Home	Road	Div
y-Atlanta Hawks	57	25	.695	–	36–5	21–20	21–7
x-Chicago Bulls	55	27	.671	2	31–10	24–17	21–7
x-Indiana Pacers	47	35	.573	10	29–12	18–23	15–13
x-Cleveland Cavaliers	47	35	.573	10	31–10	16–25	16–12
Charlotte Hornets	41	41	.500	16	28–13	13–28	12–16
Detroit Pistons	20	62	.244	37	10–31	10–31	4–24
Milwaukee Bucks	20	62	.244	37	11–30	9–32	9–19

#	Eastern Conference				
#	Team	W	L	PCT	GB
1	c-Atlanta Hawks	57	25	.695	–
2	y-New York Knicks	57	25	.695	–
3	x-Chicago Bulls	55	27	.671	2
4	x-Orlando Magic	50	32	.610	7
5	x-Indiana Pacers	47	35	.573	10
6	x-Cleveland Cavaliers	47	35	.573	10
7	x-New Jersey Nets	45	37	.549	12
8	x-Miami Heat	42	40	.512	15
9	Charlotte Hornets	41	41	.500	16
10	Boston Celtics	32	50	.390	25
11	Philadelphia 76ers	25	57	.305	32
12	Washington Bullets	24	58	.293	33
13	Milwaukee Bucks	20	62	.244	37
14	Detroit Pistons	20	62	.244	37

== Game log ==
=== Regular season ===
1993–94 game log
Total: 47–35 (home: 29–12; road: 18–23)
November: 4–8 (home: 1–6; road: 3–2)

Game	Date	Team	Score	High points	High rebounds	High assists	Location Attendance	Record
1	November 5, 1993	@ Atlanta	L 110–116				The Omni	0–1
2	November 6, 1993	Detroit	L 107–113				Market Square Arena	0–2
3	November 9, 1993	@ Orlando	L 98–104				Orlando Arena	0–3
4	November 11, 1993	@ New Jersey	W 108–105 (OT)				Brendan Byrne Arena	1–3
5	November 12, 1993; 8:00 p.m. EST	New York	L 84–103	Miller (24)	A. Davis (7)	Richardson (8)	Market Square Arena; 13,954	1–4
6	November 16, 1993	Charlotte	L 93–102				Market Square Arena	1–5
7	November 18, 1993; 7:30 p.m. EST	Houston	L 83–99	Richardson (18)	D. Davis (10)	Richardson (6)	Market Square Arena; 9,276	1–6
8	November 20, 1993	Boston	W 100–94				Market Square Arena	2–6
9	November 22, 1993	@ Boston (at Hartford, CT)	W 102–71				Hartford Civic Center	3–6
10	November 24, 1993	Philadelphia	L 97–108				Market Square Arena	3–7
11	November 26, 1993	L.A. Lakers	L 100–102				Market Square Arena	3–8
12	November 29, 1993	@ Sacramento	W 105–103				ARCO Arena	4–8

December: 6–8 (home: 4–1; road: 2–7)

Game	Date	Team	Score	High points	High rebounds	High assists	Location Attendance	Record
13	December 1, 1993	@ L.A. Clippers	W 120–100				Los Angeles Memorial Sports Arena	5–8
14	December 2, 1993; 9:00 p.m. EST	@ Utah	L 87–103	Miller (15)	D. Davis (11)	Richardson (8)	Delta Center; 19,609	5–9
15	December 4, 1993	@ Golden State	L 92–99				Oakland-Alameda County Coliseum Arena	5–10
16	December 7, 1993	Sacramento	W 105–87				Market Square Arena	6–10
17	December 9, 1993	Orlando	W 111–105				Market Square Arena	7–10
18	December 11, 1993; 7:30 p.m. EST	@ New York	L 91–98	Miller (27)	A. Davis (14)	Miller (4)	Madison Square Garden; 19,753	7–11
19	December 14, 1993	Washington	W 106–87				Market Square Arena	8–11
20	December 16, 1993	@ Atlanta	W 99–81				The Omni	9–11
21	December 18, 1993	New Jersey	W 108–98				Market Square Arena	10–11
22	December 20, 1993	@ Phoenix	L 94–102				America West Arena	10–12
23	December 21, 1993	@ Seattle	L 88–91				Market Square Arena	10–13
24	December 23, 1993	@ Portland	L 96–108				Memorial Coliseum	10–14
25	December 26, 1993	@ Cleveland	L 103–107 (OT)				Richfield Coliseum	10–15
26	December 30, 1993	San Antonio	L 82–107				Market Square Arena	10–16

January: 7–7 (home: 4–2; road: 3–5)

Game	Date	Team	Score	High points	High rebounds	High assists	Location Attendance	Record
27	January 4, 1994	Cleveland	W 104–99				Market Square Arena	11–16
28	January 5, 1994	@ Washington	L 95–97				USAir Arena	11–17
29	January 8, 1994	@ Detroit	W 101–92				The Palace of Auburn Hills	12–17
30	January 11, 1994	@ Milwaukee	W 82–76				Bradley Center	13–17
31	January 12, 1994	Denver	W 107–96				Market Square Arena	14–17
32	January 14, 1994	@ Philadelphia	L 102–104 (OT)				The Spectrum	14–18
33	January 15, 1994	Atlanta	W 94–91				Market Square Arena	15–18
34	January 19, 1994	Miami	W 109–92				Market Square Arena	16–18
35	January 21, 1994	@ Chicago	L 95–96				Chicago Stadium	16–19
36	January 22, 1994	Chicago	L 81–90				Market Square Arena	16–20
37	January 24, 1994	Milwaukee	L 88–96				Market Square Arena	16–21
38	January 26, 1994	@ L.A. Lakers	L 99–103				Great Western Forum	16–22
39	January 27, 1994	@ Denver	L 106–113				McNichols Sports Arena	16–23
40	January 29, 1994; 8:30 p.m. EST	@ Houston	W 119–108	Miller (21)	A. Davis (7)	McKey (8)	The Summit; 16,611	17–23

February: 11–2 (home: 7–0; road: 4–2)

Game	Date	Team	Score	High points	High rebounds	High assists	Location Attendance	Record
41	February 1, 1994	Washington	W 116–96				Market Square Arena	18–23
42	February 2, 1994	@ Charlotte	W 124–112				Charlotte Coliseum	19–23
43	February 4, 1994	Minnesota	W 114–93				Market Square Arena	20–23
44	February 5, 1994	Charlotte	W 111–102				Market Square Arena	21–23
45	February 7, 1994	Golden State	W 104–99				Market Square Arena	22–23
46	February 9, 1994	@ Miami	W 102–98				Miami Arena	23–23
All-Star Break
47	February 15, 1994	@ San Antonio	L 100–109				Alamodome	23–24
48	February 17, 1994	@ Dallas	W 84–73				Reunion Arena	24–24
49	February 20, 1994	Seattle	W 101–95				Market Square Arena	25–24
50	February 22, 1994	Dallas	W 107–101				Market Square Arena	26–24
51	February 23, 1994	@ Orlando	L 99–103				Orlando Arena	26–25
52	February 25, 1994	Detroit	W 110–90				Market Square Arena	27–25
53	February 26, 1994	@ Chicago	W 96–86				Chicago Stadium	28–25

March: 8–7 (home: 6–2; road: 2–5)

Game	Date	Team	Score	High points	High rebounds	High assists	Location Attendance	Record
54	March 1, 1994	Portland	W 106–94				Market Square Arena	29–25
55	March 4, 1994	New Jersey	W 126–110				Market Square Arena	30–25
56	March 5, 1994	@ Atlanta	L 88–90				The Omni	30–26
57	March 9, 1994	@ Milwaukee	W 105–94				Bradley Center	31–26
58	March 11, 1994	@ New Jersey	L 73–87				Brendan Byrne Arena	31–27
59	March 12, 1994	Milwaukee	W 104–97				Market Square Arena	32–27
60	March 15, 1994; 7:30 p.m. EST	@ New York	L 82–88	Miller (22)	D. Davis (13)	Richardson (4)	Madison Square Garden; 19,753	32–28
61	March 16, 1994	Phoenix	W 109–98				Market Square Arena	33–28
62	March 18, 1994	Atlanta	L 78–81				Market Square Arena	33–29
63	March 19, 1994; 7:30 p.m. EST	Utah	W 107–103	Smits (19)	D. Davis (16)	Workman (7)	Market Square Arena; 15,374	34–29
64	March 22, 1994	@ Cleveland	L 61–93				Richfield Coliseum	34–30
65	March 23, 1994	Cleveland	W 78–77				Market Square Arena	35–30
66	March 25, 1994; 7:30 p.m. EST	New York	L 82–85	Miller (18)	A. Davis (12)	Workman (6)	Market Square Arena; 16,675	35–31
67	March 26, 1994	@ Chicago	L 88–90				Chicago Stadium	35–32
68	March 28, 1994	L.A. Clippers	W 126–93				Market Square Arena	36–32
69	March 30, 1994	@ Boston	W 103–99				Boston Garden	37–33

April: 10–3 (home: 6–1; road: 4–2)

Game	Date	Team	Score	High points	High rebounds	High assists	Location Attendance	Record
70	April 1, 1994	@ Miami	L 91–101				Miami Arena	37–33
71	April 2, 1994	Orlando	W 128–113				Market Square Arena	38–33
72	April 5, 1994	Detroit	W 105–89				Market Square Arena	39–33
73	April 6, 1994	@ Charlotte	L 90–129				Charlotte Coliseum	39–34
74	April 8, 1994	Chicago	L 94–100				Market Square Arena	39–35
75	April 11, 1994	Boston	W 121–108				Market Square Arena	40–35
76	April 13, 1994	@ Philadelphia	W 115–87				The Spectrum	41–35
77	April 15, 1994	@ Minnesota	W 130–112				Target Center	42–35
78	April 17, 1994	@ Detroit	W 104–99				The Palace of Auburn Hills	43–35
79	April 19, 1994	@ Washington	W 111–110				USAir Arena	44–35
80	April 20, 1994	Cleveland	W 109–98				Market Square Arena	45–35
81	April 22, 1994	Philadelphia	W 133–88				Market Square Arena	46–35
82	April 23, 1994	Miami	W 114–81				Market Square Arena	47–35

1993–94 schedule

== Playoffs ==
1994 playoff game log
Eastern Conference First Round: 3–0 (home: 1–0; road: 2–0)

Game	Date	Team	Score	High points	High rebounds	High assists	Location Attendance	Series
1	April 28, 1994	@ Orlando	W 89–88	Miller (24)	D. Davis, McKey (10)	Workman (11)	Orlando Arena; 15,291	1–0
2	April 30, 1994	@ Orlando	W 103–101	Miller (32)	D. Davis (9)	Workman (10)	Orlando Arena; 15,291	2–0
3	May 2, 1994	Orlando	W 99–86	Miller (31)	D. Davis (14)	McKey (6)	Market Square Arena; 16,562	3–0

Eastern Conference semifinals: 4–2 (home: 3–0; road: 1–2)

Game	Date	Team	Score	High points	High rebounds	High assists	Location Attendance	Series
1	May 10, 1994	@ Atlanta	W 96–85	Miller (18)	D. Davis (15)	Workman (8)	The Omni; 13,190	1–0
2	May 12, 1994	@ Atlanta	L 69–92	Miller (12)	D. Davis (18)	Miller, Workman (5)	The Omni; 15,854	1–1
3	May 14, 1994	Atlanta	W 101–81	Smits (27)	Scott (8)	Workman (7)	Market Square Arena; 16,545	2–1
4	May 15, 1994	Atlanta	W 102–86	Miller (25)	McKey, Smits (8)	Workman (8)	Market Square Arena; 16,561	3–1
5	May 17, 1994	@ Atlanta	L 76–88	Miller (22)	McKey (13)	Workman (9)	The Omni; 14,849	3–2
6	May 19, 1994	Atlanta	W 98–79	Smits (27)	A. Davis, D. Davis, McKey (10)	Workman (10)	Market Square Arena; 16,552	4–2

Eastern Conference finals: 3–4 (home: 2–1; road: 1–3)

Game	Date	Team	Score	High points	High rebounds	High assists	Location Attendance	Series
1	May 24, 1994; 7:00 p.m. EST	@ New York	L 89–100	Smits (27)	D. Davis, Smits (10)	Workman (7)	Madison Square Garden; 19,763	0–1
2	May 26, 1994; 7:00 p.m. EST	@ New York	L 78–89	Miller (23)	D. Davis (11)	McKey, Workman (6)	Madison Square Garden; 19,763	0–2
3	May 28, 1994; 2:30 p.m. EST	New York	W 88–68	McKey (15)	A. Davis (10)	Workman (7)	Market Square Arena; 16,530	1–2
4	May 30, 1994; 2:30 p.m. EST	New York	W 83–77	Miller (31)	D. Davis, Miller, Workman (7)	Workman (6)	Market Square Arena; 16,536	2–2
5	June 1, 1994; 8:00 p.m. EST	@ New York	W 93–86	Miller (39)	A. Davis (9)	Miller (6)	Madison Square Garden; 19,763	3–2
6	June 3, 1994; 8:00 p.m. EST	New York	L 91–98	Miller (27)	A. Davis (9)	Fleming, McKey (5)	Market Square Arena; 16,529	3–3
7	June 5, 1994; 6:00 p.m. EST	@ New York	L 90–94	Reggie Miller (25)	A. Davis, Smits, (6)	McKey, Workman (8)	Madison Square Garden; 19,763	3–4

1994 schedule

== Player statistics ==
=== Regular season ===
Player	POS	GP	GS	MP	REB	AST	STL	BLK	PTS	MPG	RPG	APG	SPG	BPG	PPG
Antonio Davis	PF	81	4	1,732	505	55	45	84	626	21.4	6.2	.7	.6	1.0	7.7
Reggie Miller	SG	79	79	2,638	212	248	119	24	1,574	33.4	2.7	3.1	1.5	.3	19.9
Rik Smits	C	78	75	2,113	483	156	49	82	1,224	27.1	6.2	2.0	.6	1.1	15.7
Derrick McKey	SF	76	75	2,613	402	327	111	49	911	34.4	5.3	4.3	1.5	.6	12.0
Sam Mitchell	PF	75	18	1,084	190	65	33	9	362	14.5	2.5	.9	.4	.1	4.8
Kenny Williams	SF	68	1	982	205	52	24	49	427	14.4	3.0	.8	.4	.7	6.3
Byron Scott	SG	67	2	1,197	110	133	62	9	696	17.9	1.6	2.0	.9	.1	10.4
Dale Davis	PF	66	64	2,292	718	100	48	106	771	34.7	10.9	1.5	.7	1.6	11.7
Haywoode Workman	PG	65	52	1,714	204	404	85	4	501	26.4	3.1	6.2	1.3	.1	7.7
Vern Fleming	PG	55	5	1,053	123	173	40	6	358	19.1	2.2	3.1	.7	.1	6.5
Malik Sealy	SF	43	6	623	118	48	31	8	285	14.5	2.7	1.1	.7	.2	6.6
Pooh Richardson	PG	37	25	1,022	110	237	32	3	370	27.6	3.0	6.4	.9	.1	10.0
LaSalle Thompson	C	30	1	282	75	16	10	8	70	9.4	2.5	.5	.3	.3	2.3
Scott Haskin	C	27	2	186	55	6	2	15	55	6.9	2.0	.2	.1	.6	2.0
Lester Conner	PG	11	0	169	24	31	14	1	31	15.4	2.2	2.8	1.3	.1	2.8
Gerald Paddio^{†}	SF	7	1	55	5	4	1	0	19	7.9	.7	.6	.1	.0	2.7

- ^{†} Denotes player spent time with another team in the season. Stats reflect time with the Pacers only.

=== Playoffs ===
Player	POS	GP	GS	MP	REB	AST	STL	BLK	PTS	MPG	RPG	APG	SPG	BPG	PPG
Derrick McKey	SF	16	16	587	98	67	26	9	155	36.7	6.1	4.2	1.6	.6	9.7
Dale Davis	PF	16	16	578	159	11	18	17	123	36.1	9.9	.7	1.1	1.1	7.7
Reggie Miller	SG	16	16	576	48	46	21	4	371	36.0	3.0	2.9	1.3	.3	23.2
Rik Smits	C	16	16	450	84	31	10	9	256	28.1	5.3	1.9	.6	.6	16.0
Haywoode Workman	PG	16	15	511	51	112	28	1	128	31.9	3.2	7.0	1.8	.1	8.0
Vern Fleming	PG	16	1	247	21	38	10	1	95	15.4	1.3	2.4	.6	.1	5.9
Antonio Davis	PF	16	0	401	106	7	11	18	135	25.1	6.6	.4	.7	1.1	8.4
Byron Scott	SG	16	0	239	33	20	12	2	125	14.9	2.1	1.3	.8	.1	7.8
Sam Mitchell	PF	15	0	99	17	5	2	2	21	6.6	1.1	.3	.1	.1	1.4
Kenny Williams	SF	12	0	91	17	5	5	3	20	7.6	1.4	.4	.4	.3	1.7
LaSalle Thompson	C	7	0	39	10	5	3	1	10	5.6	1.4	.7	.4	.1	1.4
Lester Conner	PG	6	0	22	4	0	1	0	6	3.7	.7	.0	.2	.0	1.0
