= Tom Scheffler =

American basketball player (born 1954)

Personal information
- Born: October 27, 1954 (age 72) St. Joseph, Michigan, U.S.
- Listed height: 6 ft 11 in (2.11 m)
- Listed weight: 240 lb (109 kg)

Career information
- High school: St. Joseph (St. Joseph, Michigan)
- College: Purdue (1973–1977)
- NBA draft: 1977: 6th round, 117th overall pick
- Drafted by: Indiana Pacers
- Playing career: 1977–1991
- Position: Center
- Number: 50

Career history
- 1977–1979: Scavolini Pesaro
- 1979–1981: Liberti Treviso
- 1982–1983: Lugano Tigers
- 1983–1984: Le Mans
- 1984–1985: Portland Trail Blazers
- 1985–1986: Lugano Tigers
- 1986: Aris
- 1986–1988: Pau-Orthez
- 1988: Snaidero Caserta
- 1988–1990: Gran Canaria
- 1990–1991: Pau-Orthez

Career highlights
- French League champion (1987)
- Stats at NBA.com
- Stats at Basketball Reference

Tom Scheffler (born October 27, 1954) is an American former professional basketball player.

== Career ==
Born in St. Joseph, Michigan, Scheffler played collegiately at Purdue University before spending most of his career in Europe playing in Italy, Spain, Greece, Switzerland, and France. His only stint in the NBA was in the 1984–85 season when he played 39 games as a 12th man for Portland.

Scheffler's most notable successes came during his time with ÉB Pau-Orthez in France where his contribution resulted in Orthez winning the French basketball Championship in 1986 and 1987.

Scheffler's younger brother, Steve Scheffler, also starred at Purdue University and played for the Seattle SuperSonics.

== Post-career ==
In his post-career days, Scheffler settled in Lugano, Switzerland where he runs an English school.

== Career statistics ==
Legend
GP	Games played	GS	Games started	MPG	Minutes per game
FG%	Field goal percentage	3P%	3-point field goal percentage	FT%	Free throw percentage
RPG	Rebounds per game	APG	Assists per game	SPG	Steals per game
BPG	Blocks per game	PPG	Points per game	**Bold**	Career high

=== NBA ===
==== Regular season ====
Year	Team	GP	GS	MPG	FG%	3P%	FT%	RPG	APG	SPG	BPG	PPG
1984–85	Portland	39	0	6.9	.412	.000	.500	1.9	.3	.2	.3	1.3
