= Steve Scheffler =

American basketball player (born 1967)

Personal information
- Born: September 3, 1967 (age 59) Grand Rapids, Michigan, U.S.
- Listed height: 6 ft 9 in (2.06 m)
- Listed weight: 250 lb (113 kg)

Career information
- High school: Forest Hills Northern (Grand Rapids, Michigan)
- College: Purdue (1986–1990)
- NBA draft: 1990: 2nd round, 39th overall pick
- Drafted by: Charlotte Hornets
- Playing career: 1990–1999
- Position: Center / power forward
- Number: 55, 45, 50

Career history
- 1990–1991: Charlotte Hornets
- 1991–1992: Quad City Thunder
- 1992: Sacramento Kings
- 1992: Denver Nuggets
- 1992–1997: Seattle SuperSonics
- 1998–1999: Quad City Thunder
- 1999: Yakima Sun Kings

Career highlights
- All-CBA Second Team (1992); Third-team All-American – AP, UPI (1990); Big Ten Player of the Year (1990); First-team All-Big Ten (1990)

Career NBA statistics
- Points: 331 (1.9 ppg)
- Rebounds: 180 (1.0 rpg)
- Stats at NBA.com
- Stats at Basketball Reference
Medals
Representing United States
Men's basketball
Summer Universiade
Gold medal – first place	1989 Duisburg	Team competition

Stephen Robert Scheffler (born September 3, 1967) is an American former professional basketball player who played in the NBA. He is left-handed.

== College career ==
Scheffler attended Purdue University, located in West Lafayette, Indiana, where he played under head coach Gene Keady. During his freshman season, he got limited minutes coming off the bench, while appearing in 16 games and averaging 1.5 points and 1.5 rebounds a game. After his freshman season, Scheffler played in twice as many games during his sophomore season. He improved his scoring and rebounding, with averages of 6.8 points and 4.2 rebounds a game, while recording a .708 field goal percentage, which became a Big Ten single-season record. He helped lead the Boilermakers to a Big Ten Conference title, along with seniors Todd Mitchell and Everette Stephens, a sixth-straight NCAA Tournament appearance, making it to the Sweet Sixteen, and onto a 29–4 record after losing to a Mitch Richmond-led Kansas State team.

Scheffler's junior season showed just as much improvement as his sophomore season. Averaging 13 points and 6 rebounds a game, he also improved his free-throw percentage with a .776 accuracy, while holding a .667 field goal percentage. With key players gone from the prior season, Scheffler carried the Boilers to a 15–16 record in a highly competitive and stacked conference. He was named the team MVP and an Honorable Mention All-Big Ten. After the 1988–89 season, Scheffler was selected as a reserve center on the Gold Medal U.S. Team in the World University Games in West Germany.

As a senior at Purdue, Scheffler averaged 16.8 points and 6.1 rebounds a game, and scored in double figures in 28 of the 30 games he appeared. After coming off his junior season without a postseason, he and Jimmy Oliver led the Boilers to an NCAA Second Round appearance, where they lost to Texas by one point as a number 2 seed. He helped Purdue to a 22–8 record in his senior season. Making 71 of his last 78 free throws with a .805 percent accuracy in his career, he was named the Big Ten Player of the Year and a Third-Team All American in his senior year.

Throughout his four seasons at Purdue, Scheffler set the NCAA career field-goal percentage record at .685, which broke Ohio State's Jerry Lucas' record of .678, which was set in 1962. The 6 ft 9 in, 250-pound center-forward became one of four Boilers to win the conference player of the year honors, along with Jim Rowinski in 1984, Glenn Robinson in 1994 and Caleb Swanigan in 2017. The "Incredible Hulk" currently holds Purdue's basketball squat max record at 458 pounds and is tied at first with Glenn Robinson and Kenny Williams with 309 pounds in the power clean. He had a vertical leap of 33 inches.

== Professional career ==
Scheffler was selected by the Charlotte Hornets in the 2nd round (39th overall) of the 1990 NBA draft. He played for the Hornets, Sacramento Kings, Denver Nuggets and Seattle SuperSonics in 7 NBA seasons. Scheffler was a member of the Sonics when they reached the 1996 NBA Finals and played briefly in four of the six games against Michael Jordan and the Chicago Bulls as a crowd favorite at KeyArena coming off the bench. He was embraced as a fan favorite in Seattle for his rare appearances and stellar efforts at scoring in late-game blowout situations.

Scheffler had the ability to excel in Summer League games against young players and NBA journeymen, but then struggled getting his shot off against NBA regular season competition. He finished his 7-year, 174-game NBA career with averages of 1.9 points in 5.3 minutes per game, while shooting 55.8% from the floor. Scheffler appeared in 178 games with eight starts. He developed a high percentage mid-range jump shot during his tenure in the NBA.

== Career statistics ==
Legend
GP	Games played	GS	Games started	MPG	Minutes per game
FG%	Field goal percentage	3P%	3-point field goal percentage	FT%	Free throw percentage
RPG	Rebounds per game	APG	Assists per game	SPG	Steals per game
BPG	Blocks per game	PPG	Points per game	**Bold**	Career high

=== NBA ===
==== Regular season ====
Steve Scheffler regular season statistics
Year	Team	GP	GS	MPG	FG%	3P%	FT%	RPG	APG	SPG	BPG	PPG
1990–91	Charlotte	**39**	0	5.8	.513	–	.905	1.2	**.2**	.2	.1	1.5
1991–92	Sacramento	4	0	3.8	**1.000**	–	.833	.8	.0	.0	**.3**	**2.3**
1991–92	Denver	7	0	**6.6**	.571	–	.667	**1.6**	.0	**.4**	.0	1.7
1992–93	Seattle	29	**5**	5.7	.521	–	.667	1.2	**.2**	.2	.0	**2.3**
1993–94	Seattle	35	1	4.3	.609	–	**.950**	.7	**.2**	.2	.0	2.1
1994–95	Seattle	18	0	5.7	.522	–	.833	1.3	**.2**	.1	.1	2.2
1995–96	Seattle	35	2	5.2	.533	**.200**	.474	.9	.1	.2	.1	1.7
1996–97	Seattle	7	0	4.1	.857	–	.500	.4	.0	.0	.0	1.9
Career		174	8	5.3	.558	.200	.759	1.0	.1	.2	.0	1.9

=== Playoffs ===
Steve Scheffler playoff statistics
Year	Team	GP	GS	MPG	FG%	3P%	FT%	RPG	APG	SPG	BPG	PPG
1993	Seattle	**9**	0	2.4	.500	–	**1.000**	1.1	.1	.2	.0	1.6
1994	Seattle	1	0	**9.0**	**1.000**	–	.000	**3.0**	.0	**1.0**	.0	**2.0**
1995	Seattle	1	0	1.0	**1.000**	–	–	1.0	.0	.0	.0	**2.0**
1996	Seattle	8	0	2.8	.000	–	.000	.8	**.3**	.1	.0	.0
Career		19	0	2.8	.438	–	.500	1.1	.2	.2	.0	.9

== Personal ==
Scheffler's older brother, Tom Scheffler, also played at Purdue and in the NBA. Tom played 39 games for the Portland Trail Blazers in the 1985-86 season.
