= 1992–93 Seattle SuperSonics season =

NBA basketball team season

- Head coach: George Karl
- General manager: Bob Whitsitt
- Owner: Barry Ackerley
- Arena: Seattle Center Coliseum

Results
- Record: 55–27 (.671)
- Place: Division: 2nd (Pacific); Conference: 3rd (Western)
- Playoff finish: Western Conference finals (lost to the Phoenix Suns 3–4)
- Stats at Basketball Reference

Local media
- Television: KING-TV; Prime Sports Northwest
- Radio: KJR

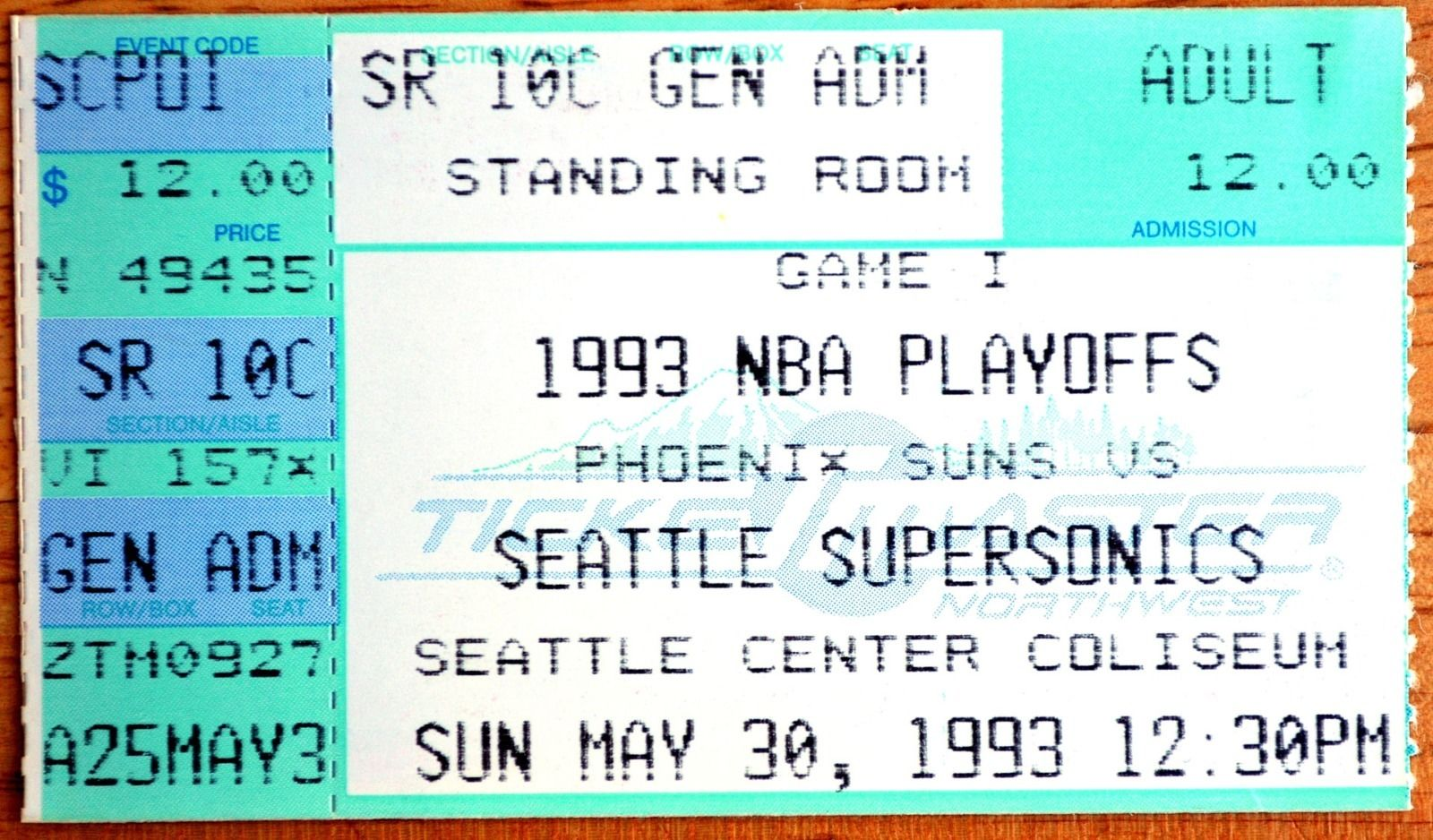
A ticket for Game 4 of the 1993 Western Conference finals between the SuperSonics and the Phoenix Suns at the Seattle Center Coliseum.

The 1992–93 Seattle SuperSonics season was the 25th season for the Seattle SuperSonics in the National Basketball Association.

== Season summary ==
=== Regular season ===
During the first month of the regular season, the SuperSonics acquired Vincent Askew from the Sacramento Kings.

Early into the regular season, the SuperSonics traveled overseas to Yokohama, Japan to play their first two games against the Houston Rockets at the Yokohama Arena. In the first game on November 6, 1992, the SuperSonics were the road team and defeated the Rockets by a score of 111–94; Shawn Kemp posted a double-double of 29 points and 20 rebounds, while Ricky Pierce scored 19 points, and Eddie Johnson added 16 points off the bench. In the second game on November 7, the SuperSonics were the home team and defeated the Rockets by a score of 89–85; Nate McMillan finished with 24 points, 7 rebounds, 5 assists and 5 steals off the bench, while Kemp posted a double-double of 20 points and 12 rebounds. Both games had an attendance of 14,544 fans at the Yokohama Arena.

With George Karl in his first full season as the team's head coach, the SuperSonics won their first four games of the regular season, posted a six-game winning streak in January, which led to a 23–8 start to the season, and later on held a 33–17 record at the All-Star break. At mid-season, the team traded Benoit Benjamin, and rookie shooting guard, and first-round draft pick Doug Christie out of Pepperdine University to the Los Angeles Lakers in exchange for Sam Perkins. The SuperSonics posted a 10-game winning streak between February and March, and posted an eight-game improvement over the previous season by finishing in second place in the Pacific Division with a 55–27 record, and earning the third seed in the Western Conference.

Kemp averaged 17.8 points, 10.7 rebounds, 1.5 steals and 1.9 blocks per game, while Pierce averaged 18.2 points and 1.3 steals per game, and Gary Payton provided the team with 13.5 points, 4.9 assists and 2.2 steals per game. In addition, sixth man Johnson contributed 14.4 points per game off the bench, while Derrick McKey provided with 13.4 points and 1.4 steals per game, and Perkins averaged 12.1 points and 4.8 rebounds per game in 30 games after the trade. Meanwhile, Dana Barros contributed 7.8 points per game, McMillan provided with 7.5 points, 5.3 assists and 2.4 steals per game, Michael Cage averaged 6.1 points and 8.0 rebounds per game, and Askew contributed 6.0 points per game.

During the NBA All-Star weekend at the Delta Center in Salt Lake City, Utah, Kemp was selected for the 1993 NBA All-Star Game, as a member of the Western Conference All-Star team; it was his first ever All-Star appearance. In addition, Kemp was also selected to participate in the NBA Slam Dunk Contest, but withdrew due to a sore right thumb injury, while Barros participated in the NBA Three-Point Shootout. Kemp finished tied in tenth place in Most Valuable Player voting, while Payton finished in sixth place in Most Improved Player voting, with Kemp finishing tied in eleventh place, and Karl finished in third place in Coach of the Year voting.

The SuperSonics finished twelfth in the NBA in home-game attendance, with an attendance of 646,589 at the Seattle Center Coliseum during the regular season.

=== NBA playoffs ===
In the Western Conference First Round of the 1993 NBA playoffs, the SuperSonics faced off against the 6th–seeded Utah Jazz, who were led by the trio of All-Star forward Karl Malone, All-Star guard John Stockton, and Jeff Malone. The SuperSonics won Game 1 over the Jazz at home, 99–85 at the Seattle Center Coliseum, but then lost the next two games, which included a Game 3 loss on the road, 90–80 at the Delta Center as the Jazz took a 2–1 series lead. However, the SuperSonics managed to win the next two games, including a Game 5 win over the Jazz at the Seattle Center Coliseum, 100–92 to win in a hard-fought five-game series.

In the Western Conference Semi-finals, the team faced off against the 2nd–seeded, and Midwest Division champion Rockets, a team that featured All-Star center, and Defensive Player of the Year, Hakeem Olajuwon, All-Star forward Otis Thorpe, and Vernon Maxwell. Despite both teams finishing with the same regular-season record, the SuperSonics had home-court advantage in the series. The SuperSonics took a 2–0 series lead over the Rockets, before losing the next two games on the road at The Summit. After winning Game 5 at the Seattle Center Coliseum, 120–95, the SuperSonics lost Game 6 to the Rockets at The Summit, 103–90. With the series tied at 3–3, the SuperSonics won Game 7 over the Rockets at the Seattle Center Coliseum in overtime, 103–100 to win in a hard-fought seven-game series.

In the Western Conference Finals, the SuperSonics then faced off against the top–seeded, and Pacific Division champion Phoenix Suns, who were led by the All-Star trio of Most Valuable Player of the Year, Charles Barkley, three-point specialist Dan Majerle, and Kevin Johnson. The Suns took a 3–2 series lead, but the SuperSonics managed to win Game 6 at the Seattle Center Coliseum, 118–102 to even the series. However, the SuperSonics lost Game 7 to the Suns on the road, 123–110 at the America West Arena, in which Barkley scored 44 points along with 24 rebounds; the SuperSonics lost to the Suns in a hard-fought seven-game series.

The Suns would advance to the 1993 NBA Finals, but would lose to the 2-time defending NBA champion Chicago Bulls in six games.

=== Aftermath ===
Following the season, McKey was traded to the Indiana Pacers, and Johnson and Barros were both dealt to the Charlotte Hornets, who then sent Barros to the Philadelphia 76ers two days later.

== Draft picks ==
| Round | Pick | Player | Position | Nationality | College |
|---|---|---|---|---|---|
| 1 | 17 | Doug Christie | SG | United States | Pepperdine |
| 2 | 45 | Chris King | SF | United States | Wake Forest |

== Roster ==
1992–93 Seattle SuperSonics roster
Players

| Pos. | No. | Player | Height | Weight | DOB | From |
|---|---|---|---|---|---|---|
| G | 17 | Vincent Askew | 6 ft 6 in (1.98 m) | 210 lb (95 kg) | 1966–02–28 | Memphis |
| G | 11 | Dana Barros | 5 ft 11 in (1.80 m) | 163 lb (74 kg) | 1967–04–13 | Boston College |
| C | 44 | Michael Cage | 6 ft 9 in (2.06 m) | 224 lb (102 kg) | 1962–01–28 | San Diego State |
| F | 8 | Eddie Johnson | 6 ft 7 in (2.01 m) | 215 lb (98 kg) | 1959–05–01 | Illinois |
| F | 40 | Shawn Kemp | 6 ft 10 in (2.08 m) | 230 lb (104 kg) | 1969–11–26 | Trinity Valley CC |
| C | 25 | Rich King | 7 ft 2 in (2.18 m) | 260 lb (118 kg) | 1969–04–04 | Nebraska |
| F | 31 | Derrick McKey | 6 ft 9 in (2.06 m) | 205 lb (93 kg) | 1966–10–10 | Alabama |
| G | 10 | Nate McMillan | 6 ft 5 in (1.96 m) | 195 lb (88 kg) | 1964–08–03 | NC State |
| G | 21 | Gerald Paddio | 6 ft 7 in (2.01 m) | 205 lb (93 kg) | 1965–04–21 | UNLV |
| G | 20 | Gary Payton | 6 ft 4 in (1.93 m) | 180 lb (82 kg) | 1968–07–23 | Oregon State |
| F | 14 | Sam Perkins | 6 ft 9 in (2.06 m) | 235 lb (107 kg) | 1961–06–14 | North Carolina |
| G | 22 | Ricky Pierce | 6 ft 4 in (1.93 m) | 205 lb (93 kg) | 1959–08–19 | Rice |
| C | 55 | Steve Scheffler | 6 ft 9 in (2.06 m) | 250 lb (113 kg) | 1967–09–03 | Purdue |

Coaches
Head coach
- George Karl
Assistant(s)
- Tim Grgurich
- Bob Kloppenburg

Legend
- (DP) Unsigned draft pick
- (FA) Free agent
- (S) Suspended
- Injured

== Regular season ==
=== Season standings ===
| Pacific Division | W | L | PCT | GB | Home | Road | Div |
|---|---|---|---|---|---|---|---|
| y-Phoenix Suns | 62 | 20 | .756 | — | 35–6 | 27–14 | 21–9 |
| x-Seattle SuperSonics | 55 | 27 | .671 | 7 | 33–8 | 22–19 | 22–8 |
| x-Portland Trail Blazers | 51 | 31 | .622 | 11 | 30–11 | 21–20 | 19–11 |
| x-Los Angeles Clippers | 41 | 41 | .500 | 21 | 27–14 | 14–27 | 15–15 |
| x-Los Angeles Lakers | 39 | 43 | .476 | 23 | 20–21 | 19–22 | 13–17 |
| Golden State Warriors | 34 | 48 | .415 | 28 | 19–22 | 15–26 | 9–21 |
| Sacramento Kings | 25 | 57 | .305 | 37 | 16–25 | 9–32 | 6–24 |

y – clinched division title
x – clinched playoff spot

| # | Western Conference | | | | |
| # | Team | W | L | PCT | GB |
|---|---|---|---|---|---|
| 1 | z-Phoenix Suns | 62 | 20 | .756 | – |
| 2 | y-Houston Rockets | 55 | 27 | .671 | 7 |
| 3 | x-Seattle SuperSonics | 55 | 27 | .671 | 7 |
| 4 | x-Portland Trail Blazers | 51 | 31 | .622 | 11 |
| 5 | x-San Antonio Spurs | 49 | 33 | .598 | 13 |
| 6 | x-Utah Jazz | 47 | 35 | .573 | 15 |
| 7 | x-Los Angeles Clippers | 41 | 41 | .500 | 21 |
| 8 | x-Los Angeles Lakers | 39 | 43 | .476 | 23 |
| 9 | Denver Nuggets | 36 | 46 | .439 | 26 |
| 10 | Golden State Warriors | 34 | 48 | .415 | 28 |
| 11 | Sacramento Kings | 25 | 57 | .305 | 37 |
| 12 | Minnesota Timberwolves | 19 | 63 | .232 | 43 |
| 13 | Dallas Mavericks | 11 | 71 | .134 | 51 |

z – clinched division title
y – clinched division title
x – clinched playoff spot

== Game log ==
=== Regular season ===
1992–93 game log
Total: 55–27 (Home: 33–8; Road: 22–19)
November: 8–4 (home: 6–1; road: 2–3)

| Game | Date | Team | Score | High points | High rebounds | High assists | Location Attendance | Record |
|---|---|---|---|---|---|---|---|---|
| 1 | November 6, 1992 | @ Houston (at Yokohama, Japan) | W 111–94 | | | | Tokyo Dome | 1–0 |
| 2 | November 7, 1992 | Houston (at Yokohama, Japan) | W 89–85 | | | | Tokyo Dome | 2–0 |
| 3 | November 12, 1992 | L.A. Lakers | W 114–102 | | | | Seattle Center Coliseum | 3–0 |
| 4 | November 14, 1992 | Sacramento | W 133–117 | | | | Seattle Center Coliseum | 4–0 |
| 5 | November 16, 1992; 6:30 p.m. PST | @ Phoenix | L 108–117 | Kemp, McKey (19) | Kemp (9) | McMillan (8) | America West Arena; 19,023 | 4–1 |
| 6 | November 17, 1992 | New York | W 100–90 | | | | Seattle Center Coliseum | 5–1 |
| 7 | November 19, 1992; 7:00 p.m. PST | Chicago | L 99–108 | Payton (18) | Kemp, McMillan (7) | Barros (7) | Kingdome; 37,401 | 5–2 |
| 8 | November 21, 1992 | Detroit | W 138–101 | | | | Seattle Center Coliseum | 6–2 |
| 9 | November 23, 1992 | @ Sacramento | L 99–103 | | | | ARCO Arena | 6–3 |
| 10 | November 24, 1992 | New Jersey | W 103–97 | | | | Seattle Center Coliseum | 7–3 |
| 11 | November 27, 1992 | @ Dallas | W 127–104 | | | | Reunion Arena | 8–3 |
| 12 | November 28, 1992 | @ San Antonio | L 97–104 | | | | HemisFair Arena | 8–4 |

December: 10–4 (home: 7–0; road: 3–4)

| Game | Date | Team | Score | High points | High rebounds | High assists | Location Attendance | Record |
|---|---|---|---|---|---|---|---|---|
| 13 | December 1, 1992 | Orlando | W 116–102 | | | | Seattle Center Coliseum | 9–4 |
| 14 | December 3, 1992 | Dallas | W 125–108 | | | | Seattle Center Coliseum | 10–4 |
| 15 | December 5, 1992 | Minnesota | W 124–87 | | | | Seattle Center Coliseum | 11–4 |
| 16 | December 8, 1992 | @ New York | L 88–100 | | | | Madison Square Garden | 11–5 |
| 17 | December 9, 1992 | @ Philadelphia | L 104–115 | | | | The Spectrum | 11–6 |
| 18 | December 11, 1992 | @ Boston | W 100–90 | | | | Boston Garden | 12–6 |
| 19 | December 12, 1992 | @ Cleveland | L 93–97 | | | | Richfield Coliseum | 12–7 |
| 20 | December 15, 1992 | Milwaukee | W 108–100 | | | | Seattle Center Coliseum | 13–7 |
| 21 | December 18, 1992 | Portland | W 126–109 | | | | Seattle Center Coliseum | 14–7 |
| 22 | December 19, 1992 | L.A. Clippers | W 121–101 | | | | Seattle Center Coliseum | 15–7 |
| 23 | December 22, 1992 | @ Portland | W 107–96 | | | | Memorial Coliseum | 16–7 |
| 24 | December 23, 1992 | @ L.A. Lakers | W 80–79 | | | | Great Western Forum | 17–7 |
| 25 | December 26, 1992; 6:30 p.m. PST | @ Phoenix | L 110–113 | Johnson (22) | Cage (8) | Payton (11) | America West Arena; 19,023 | 17–8 |
| 26 | December 29, 1992 | Boston | W 111–87 | | | | Seattle Center Coliseum | 18–8 |

January: 10–4 (home: 6–1; road: 4–3)

| Game | Date | Team | Score | High points | High rebounds | High assists | Location Attendance | Record |
|---|---|---|---|---|---|---|---|---|
| 27 | January 2, 1993 | Denver | W 108–104 | | | | Seattle Center Coliseum | 19–8 |
| 28 | January 5, 1993 | Golden State | W 116–106 | | | | Seattle Center Coliseum | 20–8 |
| 29 | January 8, 1993 | @ Minnesota | W 98–93 | | | | Target Center | 21–8 |
| 30 | January 9, 1993 | @ Denver | W 107–95 | | | | McNichols Sports Arena | 22–8 |
| 31 | January 12, 1993; 7:00 p.m. PST | Phoenix | W 122–113 | McKey (24) | Kemp (14) | Pierce (6) | Seattle Center Coliseum; 14,812 | 23–8 |
| 32 | January 14, 1993 | @ Utah | L 89–96 | | | | Delta Center | 23–9 |
| 33 | January 15, 1993 | L.A. Clippers | W 123–104 | | | | Seattle Center Coliseum | 24–9 |
| 34 | January 17, 1993 | @ Portland | L 97–109 | | | | Memorial Coliseum | 24–10 |
| 35 | January 18, 1993 | Utah | W 106–96 | | | | Seattle Center Coliseum | 25–10 |
| 36 | January 20, 1993 | @ L.A. Lakers | W 111–101 | | | | Great Western Forum | 26–10 |
| 37 | January 22, 1993 | @ Golden State | W 118–114 (2OT) | | | | Oakland-Alameda County Coliseum Arena | 27–10 |
| 38 | January 24, 1993 | @ L.A. Clippers | L 95–116 | | | | Los Angeles Memorial Sports Arena | 27–11 |
| 39 | January 27, 1993 | San Antonio | L 99–119 | | | | Seattle Center Coliseum | 27–12 |
| 40 | January 30, 1993 | Portland | W 108–86 | | | | Seattle Center Coliseum | 28–12 |

February: 9–5 (home: 3–2; road: 6–3)

| Game | Date | Team | Score | High points | High rebounds | High assists | Location Attendance | Record |
|---|---|---|---|---|---|---|---|---|
| 41 | February 1, 1993 | @ Charlotte | L 100–112 | | | | Charlotte Coliseum | 28–13 |
| 42 | February 2, 1993 | @ Atlanta | L 109–118 | | | | The Omni | 28–14 |
| 43 | February 4, 1993 | @ New Jersey | L 103–113 (OT) | | | | Brendan Byrne Arena | 28–15 |
| 44 | February 6, 1993 | @ Washington | W 120–92 | | | | Capital Centre | 29–15 |
| 45 | February 7, 1993 | @ Detroit | W 103–101 | | | | The Palace of Auburn Hills | 30–15 |
| 46 | February 9, 1993 | Denver | L 92–96 | | | | Seattle Center Coliseum | 30–16 |
| 47 | February 11, 1993 | Utah | L 96–101 | | | | Seattle Center Coliseum | 30–17 |
| 48 | February 13, 1993; 7:00 p.m. PST | Phoenix | W 95–94 | Pierce (25) | Kemp (14) | Payton (7) | Seattle Center Coliseum; 14,812 | 31–17 |
| 49 | February 16, 1993 | Washington | W 112–102 | | | | Seattle Center Coliseum | 32–17 |
| 50 | February 18, 1993 | @ Golden State | W 131–116 | | | | Oakland-Alameda County Coliseum Arena | 33–17 |
All-Star Break
| 51 | February 23, 1993 | @ Denver | W 103–99 | | | | McNichols Sports Arena | 34–17 |
| 52 | February 24, 1993 | @ Minnesota | W 89–77 | | | | Target Center | 35–17 |
| 53 | February 26, 1993 | @ Sacramento | W 141–120 | | | | ARCO Arena | 36–17 |
| 54 | February 27, 1993 | Golden State | W 109–92 | | | | Seattle Center Coliseum | 37–17 |

March: 11–6 (home: 6–2; road: 5–4)

| Game | Date | Team | Score | High points | High rebounds | High assists | Location Attendance | Record |
|---|---|---|---|---|---|---|---|---|
| 55 | March 2, 1993 | Cleveland | W 108–105 (OT) | | | | Seattle Center Coliseum | 38–17 |
| 56 | March 4, 1993 | Charlotte | W 138–112 | | | | Seattle Center Coliseum | 39–17 |
| 57 | March 6, 1993 | Philadelphia | W 149–93 | | | | Seattle Center Coliseum | 40–17 |
| 58 | March 8, 1993 | @ Indiana | L 99–105 | | | | Market Square Arena | 40–18 |
| 59 | March 9, 1993; 5:30 p.m. PST | @ Chicago | L 83–86 | Kemp (19) | Kemp (11) | Payton (6) | Chicago Stadium; 18,531 | 40–19 |
| 60 | March 11, 1993 | @ Milwaukee | W 116–105 | | | | Bradley Center | 41–19 |
| 61 | March 13, 1993 | @ Miami | L 102–106 | | | | Miami Arena | 41–20 |
| 62 | March 14, 1993 | @ Orlando | W 105–97 | | | | Orlando Arena | 42–20 |
| 63 | March 16, 1993 | Miami | W 98–85 | | | | Seattle Center Coliseum | 43–20 |
| 64 | March 18, 1993 | Sacramento | W 131–111 | | | | Seattle Center Coliseum | 44–20 |
| 65 | March 19, 1993 | @ Utah | W 108–97 | | | | Delta Center | 45–20 |
| 66 | March 21, 1993 | @ Houston | W 100–89 | | | | The Summit | 46–20 |
| 67 | March 23, 1993 | Portland | L 99–108 | | | | Seattle Center Coliseum | 46–21 |
| 68 | March 25, 1993 | Indiana | L 117–120 | | | | Seattle Center Coliseum | 46–22 |
| 69 | March 27, 1993 | L.A. Clippers | W 112–108 | | | | Seattle Center Coliseum | 47–22 |
| 70 | March 30, 1993 | @ San Antonio | L 97–99 | | | | HemisFair Arena | 47–23 |
| 71 | March 31, 1993 | @ Dallas | W 103–96 | | | | Reunion Arena | 48–23 |

April: 7–4 (home: 5–2; road: 2–2)

| Game | Date | Team | Score | High points | High rebounds | High assists | Location Attendance | Record |
|---|---|---|---|---|---|---|---|---|
| 72 | April 3, 1993 | Atlanta | W 128–105 | | | | Seattle Center Coliseum | 49–23 |
| 73 | April 6, 1993 | Dallas | L 107–109 | | | | Seattle Center Coliseum | 49–24 |
| 74 | April 9, 1993 | Sacramento | W 111–97 | | | | Seattle Center Coliseum | 50–24 |
| 75 | April 11, 1993 | @ L.A. Lakers | L 96–98 | | | | Great Western Forum | 50–25 |
| 76 | April 13, 1993 | Minnesota | W 129–95 | | | | Seattle Center Coliseum | 51–25 |
| 77 | April 16, 1993; 7:30 p.m. PDT | @ Phoenix | W 108–102 | Kemp, Payton (19) | Kemp (13) | Payton (10) | America West Arena; 19,023 | 52–25 |
| 78 | April 17, 1993 | Houston | L 81–86 | | | | Seattle Center Coliseum | 52–26 |
| 79 | April 19, 1993 | San Antonio | W 96–89 | | | | Seattle Center Coliseum | 53–26 |
| 80 | April 22, 1993 | @ L.A. Clippers | W 100–98 | | | | Los Angeles Memorial Sports Arena | 54–26 |
| 81 | April 23, 1993 | L.A. Lakers | W 122–93 | | | | Seattle Center Coliseum | 55–26 |
| 82 | April 25, 1993 | @ Golden State | L 109–119 | | | | Oakland-Alameda County Coliseum Arena | 55–27 |

1992–93 schedule

== Playoffs ==
1993 playoff game log
Western Conference First Round: 3–2 (home: 2–1; road: 1–1)

| Game | Date | Team | Score | High points | High rebounds | High assists | Location Attendance | Series |
|---|---|---|---|---|---|---|---|---|
| 1 | April 30, 1993 | Utah | W 99–85 | Shawn Kemp (29) | Shawn Kemp (17) | Nate McMillan (9) | Seattle Center Coliseum; 14,429 | 1–0 |
| 2 | May 2, 1993 | Utah | L 85–89 | Gary Payton (19) | Sam Perkins (10) | Nate McMillan (7) | Seattle Center Coliseum; 14,513 | 1–1 |
| 3 | May 4, 1993 | @ Utah | L 80–90 | Perkins, Johnson (20) | Perkins, Cage (9) | Ricky Pierce (5) | Delta Center; 19,911 | 1–2 |
| 4 | May 6, 1993 | @ Utah | W 93–80 | Eddie Johnson (24) | Shawn Kemp (11) | McKey, Payton (6) | Delta Center; 19,911 | 2–2 |
| 5 | May 8, 1993 | Utah | W 100–92 | Sam Perkins (20) | Sam Perkins (13) | Gary Payton (7) | Seattle Center Coliseum; 14,812 | 3–2 |

Western Conference Semifinals: 4–3 (home: 4–0; road: 0–3)

| Game | Date | Team | Score | High points | High rebounds | High assists | Location Attendance | Series |
|---|---|---|---|---|---|---|---|---|
| 1 | May 10, 1993 | Houston | W 99–90 | Ricky Pierce (23) | Shawn Kemp (11) | Nate McMillan (10) | Seattle Center Coliseum; 14,252 | 1–0 |
| 2 | May 12, 1993 | Houston | W 111–100 | Sam Perkins (23) | Michael Cage (14) | Derrick McKey (7) | Seattle Center Coliseum; 14,732 | 2–0 |
| 3 | May 15, 1993 | @ Houston | L 79–97 | Shawn Kemp (12) | Perkins, Cage (9) | Nate McMillan (4) | The Summit; 16,611 | 2–1 |
| 4 | May 16, 1993 | @ Houston | L 92–103 | Shawn Kemp (23) | Shawn Kemp (18) | Nate McMillan (8) | The Summit; 16,611 | 2–2 |
| 5 | May 18, 1993 | Houston | W 120–95 | Ricky Pierce (24) | Shawn Kemp (12) | Nate McMillan (5) | Seattle Center Coliseum; 14,433 | 3–2 |
| 6 | May 20, 1993 | @ Houston | L 90–103 | Perkins, Payton (14) | Shawn Kemp (9) | three players tied (3) | The Summit; 16,611 | 3–3 |
| 7 | May 22, 1993 | Houston | W 103–100 (OT) | Ricky Pierce (25) | Shawn Kemp (11) | Nate McMillan (6) | Seattle Center Coliseum; 14,812 | 4–3 |

Western Conference Finals: 3–4 (home: 2–1; road: 1–3)

| Game | Date | Team | Score | High points | High rebounds | High assists | Location Attendance | Series |
|---|---|---|---|---|---|---|---|---|
| 1 | May 24, 1993; 6:00 p.m. PDT | @ Phoenix | L 91–105 | McKey (17) | Kemp (10) | McMillan (7) | America West Arena; 19,023 | 0–1 |
| 2 | May 26, 1993; 6:00 p.m. PDT | @ Phoenix | W 103–99 | Pierce (34) | McMillan (8) | McMillan (6) | America West Arena; 19,023 | 1–1 |
| 3 | May 28, 1993; 6:00 p.m. PDT | Phoenix | L 97–104 | Pierce (28) | Kemp (12) | McMillan (5) | Seattle Center Coliseum; 14,812 | 1–2 |
| 4 | May 30, 1993; 12:30 p.m. PDT | Phoenix | W 120–101 | Kemp, McKey (20) | Kemp (8) | McKey (6) | Seattle Center Coliseum; 14,812 | 2–2 |
| 5 | June 1, 1993; 6:00 p.m. PDT | @ Phoenix | L 114–120 | Kemp (33) | Kemp, Perkins (6) | Payton (8) | America West Arena; 19,023 | 2–3 |
| 6 | June 3, 1993; 6:00 p.m. PDT | Phoenix | W 118–102 | Pierce (27) | Kemp (15) | McKey (5) | Seattle Center Coliseum; 14,812 | 3–3 |
| 7 | June 5, 1993; 12:30 p.m. PDT | @ Phoenix | L 110–123 | Johnson (34) | Kemp (8) | McMillan (7) | America West Arena; 19,023 | 3–4 |

1993 schedule

== Player statistics ==
Legend
| GP | Games played | GS | Games started | MPG | Minutes per game |
| FG% | Field-goal percentage | 3P% | 3-point field-goal percentage | FT% | Free-throw percentage |
| RPG | Rebounds per game | APG | Assists per game | SPG | Steals per game |
| BPG | Blocks per game | PPG | Points per game |

=== Season ===
| Player | GP | GS | MPG | FG% | 3P% | FT% | RPG | APG | SPG | BPG | PPG |
|---|---|---|---|---|---|---|---|---|---|---|---|
| Vincent Askew | 64 | 4 | 16.5 | .495 | .333 | .701 | 2.3 | 1.8 | .6 | .3 | 6.0 |
| Dana Barros | 69 | 2 | 18.0 | .451 | .379 | .831 | 1.6 | 2.2 | .9 | .0 | 7.8 |
| Benoit Benjamin^{1} | 31 | 6 | 14.5 | .497 | .000 | .701 | 3.6 | .4 | .5 | 1.1 | 6.7 |
| Michael Cage | 82 | 66 | 26.3 | .526 | .000 | .469 | 8.0 | .8 | .9 | .6 | 6.1 |
| Eddie Johnson | 82 | 0 | 22.8 | .467 | .304 | .911 | 3.3 | 1.6 | .4 | .0 | 14.4 |
| Shawn Kemp | 78 | 68 | 33.1 | .492 | .000 | .712 | 10.7 | 2.0 | 1.5 | 1.9 | 17.8 |
| Rich King | 3 | 0 | 4.0 | .400 | .000 | 1.000 | 1.7 | .3 | .0 | .0 | 2.0 |
| Derrick McKey | 77 | 68 | 31.7 | .496 | .357 | .741 | 4.2 | 2.6 | 1.4 | .8 | 13.4 |
| Nate McMillan | 73 | 25 | 27.1 | .464 | .385 | .709 | 4.2 | 5.3 | 2.4 | .4 | 7.5 |
| Gerald Paddio | 41 | 3 | 7.5 | .447 | .250 | .667 | 1.2 | .8 | .3 | .1 | 3.9 |
| Gary Payton | 82 | 78 | 31.1 | .494 | .206 | .770 | 3.4 | 4.9 | 2.2 | .3 | 13.5 |
| Sam Perkins | 30 | 13 | 25.4 | .511 | .452 | .795 | 4.8 | .9 | .7 | 1.0 | 12.1 |
| Ricky Pierce | 77 | 72 | 28.8 | .489 | .372 | .889 | 2.5 | 2.9 | 1.3 | .1 | 18.2 |
| Steve Scheffler | 29 | 5 | 5.7 | .521 | .000 | .667 | 1.2 | .2 | .2 | .0 | 2.3 |

1. Statistics with the SuperSonics.

=== Playoffs ===
| Player | GP | GS | MPG | FG% | 3P% | FT% | RPG | APG | SPG | BPG | PPG |
|---|---|---|---|---|---|---|---|---|---|---|---|
| Vincent Askew | 12 | 0 | 8.6 | .561 | .000 | .696 | 1.6 | .8 | .1 | .1 | 5.2 |
| Dana Barros | 16 | 0 | 8.5 | .468 | .313 | .750 | .8 | .8 | .3 | .0 | 3.4 |
| Michael Cage | 19 | 2 | 19.9 | .525 | .000 | .389 | 5.8 | .5 | .7 | .4 | 4.8 |
| Eddie Johnson | 19 | 0 | 20.1 | .390 | .333 | .935 | 2.4 | .9 | .2 | .1 | 10.8 |
| Shawn Kemp | 19 | 19 | 34.9 | .512 | .000 | .809 | 10.0 | 2.6 | 1.5 | 2.1 | 16.5 |
| Derrick McKey | 19 | 17 | 34.1 | .525 | .400 | .667 | 5.2 | 3.7 | .6 | .9 | 11.3 |
| Nate McMillan | 19 | 2 | 21.8 | .340 | .208 | .533 | 3.5 | 5.4 | .6 | 1.3 | 4.8 |
| Gerald Paddio | 9 | 0 | 3.3 | .500 | .000 | .000 | .3 | .4 | .2 | .1 | 1.6 |
| Gary Payton | 19 | 19 | 31.8 | .443 | .167 | .676 | 3.3 | 3.7 | 1.8 | .2 | 12.3 |
| Sam Perkins | 19 | 17 | 32.9 | .436 | .380 | .873 | 7.0 | 1.9 | 1.0 | 1.3 | 14.4 |
| Ricky Pierce | 19 | 19 | 30.4 | .456 | .400 | .898 | 2.4 | 2.2 | .6 | .2 | 17.7 |
| Steve Scheffler | 9 | 0 | 2.4 | .500 | .000 | .1000 | 1.1 | .1 | .2 | .0 | 1.6 |

Player statistics citation:

== Awards and records ==
=== Awards ===
- Shawn Kemp was selected to play in the 1993 NBA All-Star Game for the West.

== Transactions ==
=== Overview ===
Players Added ----

Via free agency

- Corey Gaines
- Gerald Paddio
- Steve Scheffler

Via trade

- Sam Perkins
- Vincent Askew
Players Lost ----

Via free agency

- Bart Kofoed
- Marty Conlon

Via trade

- Benoit Benjamin

Via waivers

- Corey Gaines

=== Trades ===
| November 25, 1992 | To Seattle SuperSonics----Conditional 2nd-round pick for the 1993 NBA draft | To Sacramento Kings----Vincent Askew |
| February 22, 1993 | To Seattle SuperSonics----Sam Perkins | To Los Angeles Lakers----Benoit Benjamin----Draft rights to Doug Christie |

=== Free agents ===
==== Additions ====
| Player | Signed | Former team |
| Corey Gaines | October 7 | |
| Gerald Paddio | October 8 | Cleveland Cavaliers |
| Steve Scheffler | October 8 | Denver Nuggets |

==== Subtractions ====
| Player | Left | New team |
| Marty Conlon | October 1 | Sacramento Kings |
| Bart Kofoed | October 8 | Boston Celtics |

=== Waivings ===
| Player | Left |
| Corey Gaines | November 19 |

Player Transactions Citation:

== See also ==
- 1992–93 NBA season
