= Gerald Paddio =

American basketball player (1965–2026)

Personal information
- Born: April 21, 1965 Lafayette, Louisiana, U.S.
- Died: April 4, 2026 (aged 60) Rayne, Louisiana, U.S.
- Listed height: 6 ft 7 in (2.01 m)
- Listed weight: 205 lb (93 kg)

Career information
- High school: Rayne (Rayne, Louisiana)
- College: Kilgore College (1984–1985); Seminole State (1985–1986); UNLV (1986–1988)
- NBA draft: 1988: 3rd round, 74th overall pick
- Drafted by: Boston Celtics
- Playing career: 1988–2004
- Position: Small forward
- Number: 24, 21, 14, 35, 4

Career history
- 1988: Rockford Lightning
- 1988–1989: Rochester Flyers
- 1989–1990: BCM Gravelines
- 1990–1991: Cleveland Cavaliers
- 1991: Grand Rapids Hoops
- 1991–1992: Rockford Lightning
- 1992: Zaragoza
- 1992–1993: Seattle SuperSonics
- 1993: Indiana Pacers
- 1993–1994: Scavolini Pesaro
- 1994: New York Knicks
- 1994: Washington Bullets
- 1994: Rapid City Thrillers
- 1994–1995: Maccabi Rishon LeZion
- 1995–1996: Chicago Rockers
- 1996: Ourense
- 1996–1997: Maccabi Giv'at Shmuel
- 1997–1999: Matsuhita Panasonic
- 2000–2001: Maccabi Rishon LeZion
- 2001–2002: Las Vegas Slam
- 2002: Soles de Jalisco
- 2002–2003: Kahraba Beirut
- 2003–2004: Ferro Carril Oeste

Career highlights
- Second-team All-PCAA (1988); First-team NJCAA All-American (1986)
- Stats at NBA.com
- Stats at Basketball Reference

Gerald James Paddio (April 21, 1965 – April 4, 2026) was an American professional basketball player who was a small forward for three seasons in the National Basketball Association (NBA) for five teams—the Cleveland Cavaliers, Seattle SuperSonics, Indiana Pacers, New York Knicks, and Washington Bullets. He played college basketball for the UNLV Runnin' Rebels and was selected by the Boston Celtics in the third round of the 1988 NBA draft with the 74th overall pick.

In his NBA career, Paddio appeared in 129 games and scored a total of 715 points. His most notable year as a professional was during the 1990–91 NBA season as a member of the Cavaliers when he appeared in 70 games and averaged 7.2 ppg.

== College ==
During his college playing days at the University of Nevada, Las Vegas, he was coached by Jerry Tarkanian. Paddio was a starting forward the 1987 UNLV team that reached the Final Four. Before UNLV, he was named a first-team junior college All-American at Seminole State.

== Death ==
Paddio died in a single-vehicle traffic collision in Rayne, Louisiana, on April 4, 2026, at the age of 60.

== Career statistics ==
Legend
| GP | Games played | GS | Games started | MPG | Minutes per game |
| FG% | Field goal percentage | 3P% | 3-point field goal percentage | FT% | Free throw percentage |
| RPG | Rebounds per game | APG | Assists per game | SPG | Steals per game |
| BPG | Blocks per game | PPG | Points per game | **Bold** | Career high |

=== NBA ===
==== Regular season ====
| Year | Team | GP | GS | MPG | FG% | 3P% | FT% | RPG | APG | SPG | BPG | PPG |
|---|---|---|---|---|---|---|---|---|---|---|---|---|
| 1990–91 | Cleveland | **70** | **22** | **16.9** | .419 | **.250** | **.796** | **1.7** | **1.3** | .3 | **.1** | **7.2** |
| 1992–93 | Seattle | 41 | 3 | 7.5 | **.447** | **.250** | .667 | 1.2 | .8 | .3 | **.1** | 3.9 |
| 1993–94 | Indiana | 7 | 1 | 7.9 | .391 | – | .500 | .7 | .6 | .1 | .0 | 2.7 |
| 1993–94 | New York | 3 | 0 | 2.7 | .400 | – | – | .0 | .0 | .0 | .0 | 1.3 |
| 1993–94 | Washington | 8 | 0 | 9.3 | .344 | .000 | .571 | 1.4 | .9 | **.4** | .0 | 3.8 |
| Career | | 129 | 26 | 12.6 | .421 | .242 | .746 | 1.4 | 1.0 | .3 | .1 | 5.5 |

==== Playoffs ====
| Year | Team | GP | GS | MPG | FG% | 3P% | FT% | RPG | APG | SPG | BPG | PPG |
|---|---|---|---|---|---|---|---|---|---|---|---|---|
| 1993 | Seattle | 9 | 0 | 3.3 | .500 | .000 | – | .3 | .4 | .2 | .1 | 1.6 |
