= 1995–96 New York Knicks season =

Season of National Basketball Association team the New York Knicks

- Head coach: Don Nelson (fired); Jeff Van Gundy
- General manager: Ernie Grunfeld
- Owners: ITT; Cablevision
- Arena: Madison Square Garden

Results
- Record: 47–35 (.573)
- Place: Division: 2nd (Atlantic); Conference: 4th (Eastern)
- Playoff finish: Conference semifinals (lost to Bulls 1–4)
- Stats at Basketball Reference

Local media
- Television: MSG Network
- Radio: WFAN

The 1995–96 New York Knicks season was the 50th season for the New York Knicks in the National Basketball Association.

== Season summary ==
=== Off-season ===
After Pat Riley left to coach the Miami Heat, the Knicks hired Don Nelson as their new head coach (their "Plan B" after Chuck Daly rejected their offer). The team also signed free agent Gary Grant in November.

For the season, the Knicks slightly updated their primary logo; the team added the city name "New York" in blue letters, above their primary logo of the team name "Knicks" in orange letters with blue and black shadows, and an orange basketball with blue seams in front of a silver triangle with a blue outline. The team also revealed new blue alternate road uniforms, which featured a V-shaped collar, a black and orange trim, and black side panels with an orange outline on their jerseys and shorts; the shorts also featured the jersey number on the left side panel, and their primary logo on the right side panel.

The Knicks wore their new alternate uniforms on the road frequently, that they would eventually become their primary road uniforms for the 1997–98 season, where they would also change their home uniforms, adding blue side panels to their jerseys and shorts.

=== Regular season ===
Under Nelson, the Knicks won ten of their first twelve games of the regular season, got off to a 16–5 start to the season, and later on held a 30–16 record at the All-Star break. At mid-season, the team traded Charles D. Smith, and second-year forward Monty Williams to the San Antonio Spurs in exchange for J.R. Reid, and Brad Lohaus, and then traded Doug Christie, and Herb Williams to the expansion Toronto Raptors in exchange for Willie Anderson, and Victor Alexander. Williams only played just one game for the Raptors, and was released and re-signed by the Knicks for the remainder of the season.

However, the Knicks struggled losing nine of their next twelve games after the All-Star break. With a 34–25 record, Nelson was fired as head coach after clashing with several players on the team, and was replaced with long-time assistant coach Jeff Van Gundy. Under Van Gundy, the Knicks played around .500 in winning percentage for the remainder of the season, finishing in second place in the Atlantic Division with a 47–35 record, and earning the fifth seed in the Eastern Conference; the team qualified for the NBA playoffs for the ninth consecutive year.

Patrick Ewing averaged 22.5 points, 10.6 rebounds and 2.4 blocks per game, while last season's Sixth Man of the Year Anthony Mason became the team's starting small forward, averaging 14.6 points, 9.3 rebounds and 4.4 assists per game, and Derek Harper provided the team with 14.0 points, 4.3 assists and 1.6 steals per game, along with 121 three-point field goals. In addition, John Starks contributed 12.6 points, 3.9 assists and 1.3 steals per game, and led the Knicks with 143 three-point field goals, while Charles Oakley provided with 11.4 points and 8.7 rebounds per game, but only played 53 games due to a broken thumb, and an eye injury, and three-point specialist Hubert Davis contributed 10.7 points per game and 127 three-point field goals off the bench, while shooting .476 in three-point field-goal percentage. Meanwhile, Reid averaged 6.6 points and 4.0 rebounds per game in 33 games after the trade, and Anderson contributed 5.0 points per game in 27 games.

During the NBA All-Star weekend at the Alamodome in San Antonio, Texas, Ewing was selected for the 1996 NBA All-Star Game, as a member of the Eastern Conference All-Star team. Meanwhile, Davis participated in the NBA Three-Point Shootout, and before the mid-season trade, Christie participated in the NBA Slam Dunk Contest. The Knicks finished sixth in the NBA in home-game attendance, with an attendance of 810,283 at Madison Square Garden during the regular season.

=== NBA playoffs ===
In the Eastern Conference First Round of the 1996 NBA playoffs, and for the second consecutive year, the Knicks faced off against the 4th–seeded Cleveland Cavaliers, a team that featured All-Star guard Terrell Brandon, Chris Mills and Bobby Phills. Despite both teams finishing with the same regular-season record, the Cavaliers had home-court advantage in the series. Despite this, the Knicks managed to win their first two road games over the Cavaliers at the Gund Arena, before winning Game 3 at home, 81–76 at Madison Square Garden to win the series in a three-game sweep.

In the Eastern Conference Semi-finals, the team faced off against the top–seeded, and Central Division champion Chicago Bulls, who were led by the trio of All-Star guard, and Most Valuable Player of the Year, Michael Jordan, All-Star forward Scottie Pippen, and rebound-specialist Dennis Rodman, and also finished with a league-best 72–10 record. The Knicks lost the first two games to the Bulls on the road at the United Center, but managed to win Game 3 at Madison Square Garden in overtime, 102–99 at Madison Square Garden. However, the Knicks lost the next two games, which included a Game 5 loss to the Bulls at the United Center, 94–81, thus losing the series in five games.

The Bulls would defeat the Seattle SuperSonics in six games in the 1996 NBA Finals, winning their fourth NBA championship in six years.

=== Aftermath ===
Following the season, Mason and Lohaus were both traded to the Charlotte Hornets, while Harper re-signed as a free agent with his former team, the Dallas Mavericks, Davis was traded to the Toronto Raptors, and Reid, Anderson, Grant and Alexander were all released to free agency.

== Offseason ==
=== NBA draft ===
The Knicks had no draft picks for 1995.

== Roster ==
1995–96 New York Knicks roster
Players

Pos.	No.	Player	Height	Weight	DOB	From
G	40	Willie Anderson	6 ft 7 in (2.01 m)	190 lb (86 kg)	1967–01–08	Georgia
G	44	Hubert Davis	6 ft 5 in (1.96 m)	183 lb (83 kg)	1970–05–17	North Carolina
C	33	Patrick Ewing	7 ft 0 in (2.13 m)	240 lb (109 kg)	1962–08–05	Georgetown
F	20	Ron Grandison	6 ft 6 in (1.98 m)	215 lb (98 kg)	1964–07–09	LSU New Orleans
G	23	Gary Grant	6 ft 3 in (1.91 m)	185 lb (84 kg)	1965–04–21	Michigan
G	11	Derek Harper	6 ft 4 in (1.93 m)	185 lb (84 kg)	1961–10–13	Illinois
F	54	Brad Lohaus	6 ft 11 in (2.11 m)	230 lb (104 kg)	1964–09–29	Iowa
F	14	Anthony Mason	6 ft 7 in (2.01 m)	250 lb (113 kg)	1966–12–14	Tennessee State
F	34	Charles Oakley	6 ft 8 in (2.03 m)	225 lb (102 kg)	1963–12–18	Virginia Union
F	7	J. R. Reid	6 ft 9 in (2.06 m)	247 lb (112 kg)	1968–03–31	North Carolina
G	3	John Starks	6 ft 3 in (1.91 m)	180 lb (82 kg)	1965–08–10	Oklahoma State
G	21	Charlie Ward	6 ft 2 in (1.88 m)	190 lb (86 kg)	1970–10–12	Florida State
C	32	Herb Williams	6 ft 10 in (2.08 m)	242 lb (110 kg)	1958–02–16	Ohio State

Coaches
Head coach
- Don Nelson (fired)
- Jeff Van Gundy
Assistant(s)
- Greg Brittenham
- Don Chaney
- Jeff Nix
- Bob Salmi

Legend
- (DP) Unsigned draft pick
- (FA) Free agent
- (S) Suspended
- Injured

Roster
Updated: March 29, 1996

=== Roster notes ===
- Center Victor Alexander was acquired by the Knicks from the expansion Toronto Raptors in a mid-season trade, but was placed on the injured reserve list due to a foot injury and weight problems, missed the entire regular season, and never played for the Knicks.
- Small forward Anthony Tucker was on the injured reserve list due to a back injury, missed the entire regular season, and never played for the Knicks.
- Center Herb Williams was traded at mid-season to the Raptors, where he would only play just one game before being waived, and was re-signed by the Knicks for the remainder of the season.

== Regular season ==
=== Season standings ===
Atlantic Division	W	L	PCT	GB	Home	Road	Div	GP
y–Orlando Magic	60	22	.732	12.0	37‍–‍4	23‍–‍18	21–3	82
x–New York Knicks	47	35	.573	25.0	26‍–‍15	21‍–‍20	16–8	82
x–Miami Heat	42	40	.512	30.0	26‍–‍15	16‍–‍25	13–12	82
Washington Bullets	39	43	.476	33.0	25‍–‍16	14‍–‍27	10–14	82
Boston Celtics	33	49	.402	39.0	18‍–‍23	15‍–‍26	12–12	82
New Jersey Nets	30	52	.366	42.0	20‍–‍21	10‍–‍31	8–17	82
Philadelphia 76ers	18	64	.220	54.0	11‍–‍30	7‍–‍34	5–19	82

Eastern Conference
#	Team	W	L	PCT	GB	GP
1	z–Chicago Bulls	72	10	.878	–	82
2	y–Orlando Magic	60	22	.732	12.0	82
3	x–Indiana Pacers	52	30	.634	20.0	82
4	x–Cleveland Cavaliers	47	35	.573	25.0	82
5	x–New York Knicks	47	35	.573	25.0	82
6	x–Atlanta Hawks	46	36	.561	26.0	82
7	x–Detroit Pistons	46	36	.561	26.0	82
8	x–Miami Heat	42	40	.512	30.0	82
9	Charlotte Hornets	41	41	.500	31.0	82
10	Washington Bullets	39	43	.476	33.0	82
11	Boston Celtics	33	49	.402	39.0	82
12	New Jersey Nets	30	52	.366	42.0	82
13	Milwaukee Bucks	25	57	.305	47.0	82
14	Toronto Raptors	21	61	.256	51.0	82
15	Philadelphia 76ers	18	64	.220	54.0	82

=== Schedule ===
Game	Date	Opponent	Result	Knicks points	Opponents	Record	Streak	Notes
1								

== Playoffs ==
1996 playoff game log
First Round: 3–0 (home: 1–0; road: 2–0)

Game	Date	Team	Score	High points	High rebounds	High assists	Location Attendance	Series
1	April 25	@ Cleveland	W 106–83	Patrick Ewing (23)	three players tied (7)	three players tied (7)	Gund Arena; 16,419	1–0
2	April 27	@ Cleveland	W 84–80	Anthony Mason (23)	Mason, Ewing (12)	John Starks (7)	Gund Arena; 17,232	2–0
3	May 1	Cleveland	W 81–76	John Starks (22)	Patrick Ewing (10)	three players tied (4)	Madison Square Garden; 19,763	3–0

Conference semifinals: 1–4 (home: 1–1; road: 0–3)

Game	Date	Team	Score	High points	High rebounds	High assists	Location Attendance	Series
1	May 5	@ Chicago	L 84–91	Patrick Ewing (21)	Patrick Ewing (16)	Derek Harper (5)	United Center; 24,394	0–1
2	May 7	@ Chicago	L 80–91	Patrick Ewing (23)	Charles Oakley (11)	Derek Harper (5)	United Center; 24,328	0–2
3	May 11	Chicago	W 102–99 (OT)	John Starks (30)	Oakley, Ewing (13)	John Starks (6)	Madison Square Garden; 19,763	1–2
4	May 12	Chicago	L 91–94	Patrick Ewing (29)	Patrick Ewing (10)	Derek Harper (5)	Madison Square Garden; 19,763	1–3
5	May 14	@ Chicago	L 81–94	Patrick Ewing (22)	Charles Oakley (13)	Derek Harper (6)	United Center; 24,396	1–4

1996 schedule

== Player statistics ==
Legend
GP	Games played	GS	Games started	MPG	Minutes per game
FG%	Field-goal percentage	3P%	3-point field-goal percentage	FT%	Free-throw percentage
RPG	Rebounds per game	APG	Assists per game	SPG	Steals per game
BPG	Blocks per game	PPG	Points per game

=== Regular season ===
Player	GP	GS	MPG	FG%	3P%	FT%	RPG	APG	SPG	BPG	PPG
Willie Anderson^{†}	27	2	18.4	.421	.200	.613	2.2	1.8	.6	.3	5.0
Doug Christie^{†}	23	0	9.5	.479	.526	.591	1.5	1.1	.5	.1	4.0
Hubert Davis	74	14	24.0	.486	.476	.868	1.7	1.4	.4	.1	10.7
Patrick Ewing	76	76	36.6	.466	.143	.761	10.6	2.1	.9	2.4	22.5
Matt Fish^{†}	2	1	8.5	.600		.000	1.5	.5	.0	.5	6.0
Ronnie Grandison^{†}	6	0	9.5	.467		.667	2.2	.3	.7	.2	3.0
Gary Grant	47	1	12.7	.486	.333	.828	1.1	1.5	.8	.1	4.9
Derek Harper	82	82	35.3	.464	.372	.757	2.5	4.3	1.6	.1	14.0
Brad Lohaus^{†}	23	7	14.1	.405	.421	1.000	1.3	1.2	.3	.4	3.9
Anthony Mason	82	82	42.2	.563		.720	9.3	4.4	.8	.4	14.6
Charles Oakley	53	51	33.5	.471	.269	.833	8.7	2.6	1.1	.3	11.4
J. R. Reid^{†}	33	16	20.3	.550		.782	4.0	.8	.5	.2	6.6
Charles Smith^{†}	41	4	21.7	.388	.133	.709	3.9	.7	.4	1.2	7.4
John Starks	81	71	30.8	.443	.361	.753	2.9	3.9	1.3	.1	12.6
Charlie Ward	62	1	12.7	.399	.333	.685	1.6	2.1	.9	.1	3.9
Herb Williams^{†}	43	2	12.6	.410	.250	.650	1.9	.6	.3	.7	3.1
Monty Williams^{†}	14	0	4.4	.318		.625	1.2	.3	.1	.0	1.4

=== Playoffs ===
Player	GP	GS	MPG	FG%	3P%	FT%	RPG	APG	SPG	BPG	PPG
Willie Anderson	4	0	16.0	.318	.167	.857	2.3	.3	1.0	.0	5.3
Hubert Davis	8	0	18.1	.548	.526	.818	1.5	.5	.0	.0	6.6
Patrick Ewing	8	8	41.0	.474	.500	.651	10.6	1.9	.1	3.1	21.5
Ronnie Grandison	2	0	1.5	.000	.000		.0	.0	.0	.0	.0
Gary Grant	1	0	8.0	.400	.667		3.0	.0	1.0	.0	6.0
Derek Harper	8	8	36.6	.354	.314	.733	2.1	4.8	1.3	.1	10.0
Anthony Mason	8	8	43.8	.526		.679	7.8	3.3	.5	.1	12.6
Charles Oakley	8	8	38.5	.500	.333	.694	8.6	1.8	1.0	.0	13.1
J. R. Reid	1	0	7.0	1.000			1.0	1.0	.0	.0	2.0
John Starks	8	8	39.3	.448	.467	.744	3.6	4.1	1.6	.1	16.0
Charlie Ward	7	0	13.1	.481	.250	.429	1.3	2.4	1.6	.0	4.6
Herb Williams	5	0	6.6	.600		.750	.0	.0	.0	.4	1.8

- ^{†} Denotes player spent time with another team in the season. Stats reflect time with the Knicks only.

Player statistics citation:

== Transactions ==
=== Trades ===
October 13, 1995	To New York Knicks 1996 1st-round pick To Miami Heat Pat Riley (coach)

February 8, 1996	To New York Knicks Brad Lohaus; J. R. Reid; 1996 1st-round pick To San Antonio Spurs Charles Smith; Monty Williams

February 18, 1996	To New York Knicks Victor Alexander; Willie Anderson To Toronto Raptors Doug Christie; Herb Williams; Cash

=== Free agents ===
Additions
Player	Date signed	Former team
Gary Grant	November 8	Los Angeles Clippers
Matt Fish (10-day)	February 24	Fort Wayne Fury (CBA)
Herb Williams	February 28	Toronto Raptors
Ron Grandison (first 10-day)	March 12	Omaha Racers (CBA)
Ron Grandison (remainder of season)	March 29	New York Knicks

Subtractions
Player	Date signed	New Team
Matt Fish	March 5	Denver Nuggets

Player transactions citation:

== See also ==
- 1995-96 NBA season
