= 1995–96 Charlotte Hornets season =

NBA professional basketball team season

- Head coach: Allan Bristow
- General manager: Bob Bass
- Owner: George Shinn
- Arena: Charlotte Coliseum

Results
- Record: 41–41 (.500)
- Place: Division: 6th (Central); Conference: 9th (Eastern)
- Playoff finish: Did not qualify
- Stats at Basketball Reference

Local media
- Television: SportSouth; WJZY; WFVT
- Radio: WBT

The 1995–96 Charlotte Hornets season was the eighth season for the Charlotte Hornets in the National Basketball Association.

== Season summary ==
=== Off-season ===
The Hornets had the 22nd overall pick in the 1995 NBA draft, and selected center George Zidek from the University of California, Los Angeles. During the off-season, the team re-acquired former Hornets guard Kendall Gill from the Seattle SuperSonics; on the first day of the regular season, which began on November 3, 1995, the Hornets acquired Glen Rice, Matt Geiger and second-year guard Khalid Reeves from the Miami Heat.

=== Regular season ===
With the addition of Rice, Gill and Geiger, the Hornets struggled losing eight of their first eleven games of the regular season, and played slightly below .500 in winning percentage with a 22–24 record at the All-Star break. In January, the team traded Gill, and Reeves to the New Jersey Nets in exchange for All-Star guard Kenny Anderson, who became the team's starting point guard, as Muggsy Bogues only played just six games due to a knee injury. Scott Burrell was also out for the remainder of the season due to a shoulder injury after only playing just 20 games. The Hornets played above .500 for the remainder of the season, but lost five of their final seven games, finishing in sixth place in the Central Division with a 41–41 record, and missing the NBA playoffs by finishing just one game behind the 8th–seeded Miami Heat.

Rice averaged 21.6 points and 4.8 rebounds per game, and led the Hornets with 171 three-point field goals, while Larry Johnson averaged 20.5 points, 8.4 rebounds and 4.4 assists per game, and Anderson provided the team with 15.2 points, 8.6 assists and 1.6 steals per game in 38 games after the trade. In addition, sixth man Dell Curry contributed 14.5 points and 1.3 steals per game, along with 164 three-point field goals, while Burrell provided with 13.2 points, 4.9 rebounds and 1.4 steals per game, and Geiger averaged 11.2 points and 8.4 rebounds per game. Meanwhile, Robert Parish averaged 3.9 points and 4.1 rebounds per game, and Zidek contributed 4.0 points and 2.6 rebounds per game.

During the NBA All-Star weekend at the Alamodome in San Antonio, Texas, Rice was selected for the 1996 NBA All-Star Game, as a member of the Eastern Conference All-Star team; it was his first ever All-Star appearance. In addition, Rice also participated in the NBA Three-Point Shootout for the second consecutive year, while Zidek was selected for the NBA Rookie Game, as a member of the Eastern Conference Rookie team. Curry finished tied in seventh place in Sixth Man of the Year voting, while Geiger finished tied in 14th place in Most Improved Player voting.

The Hornets led the NBA in home-game attendance for the seventh time in their eight-year history, with an attendance of 985,722 at the Charlotte Coliseum during the regular season. The Hornets, along with the Indiana Pacers, were the only two teams in the league to defeat the Chicago Bulls on the road during their historic 72–10 season, as the Hornets defeated the Bulls, 98–97 at the United Center on April 8, 1996.

=== Aftermath ===
Following the season, Johnson was traded to the New York Knicks after five seasons with the Hornets, while Anderson signed as a free agent with the Portland Trail Blazers, Robert Parish signed with the Chicago Bulls, Michael Adams retired, and head coach Allan Bristow resigned after five seasons with the franchise.

== NBA draft ==
Round	Pick	Player	Position	Nationality	College
1	22	George Zidek	C	Czech Republic	UCLA

== Roster ==
1995–96 Charlotte Hornets roster
Players

Pos.	No.	Player	Height	Weight	DOB	From
G	23	Michael Adams	5 ft 10 in (1.78 m)	162 lb (73 kg)	1963–01–19	Boston College
F	7	Rafael Addison	6 ft 7 in (2.01 m)	215 lb (98 kg)	1964–07–22	Syracuse
G	12	Kenny Anderson	6 ft 0 in (1.83 m)	168 lb (76 kg)	1970–10–09	Georgia Tech
G	1	Muggsy Bogues	5 ft 3 in (1.60 m)	136 lb (62 kg)	1965–01–09	Wake Forest
G	24	Scott Burrell	6 ft 7 in (2.01 m)	218 lb (99 kg)	1971–01–12	Connecticut
G	30	Dell Curry	6 ft 4 in (1.93 m)	190 lb (86 kg)	1964–06–25	Virginia Tech
C	52	Matt Geiger	7 ft 0 in (2.13 m)	243 lb (110 kg)	1969–09–10	Georgia Tech
G	5	Anthony Goldwire	6 ft 1 in (1.85 m)	182 lb (83 kg)	1971–09–06	Houston
F	4	Darrin Hancock	6 ft 7 in (2.01 m)	205 lb (93 kg)	1971–11–03	Kansas
F	2	Larry Johnson	6 ft 6 in (1.98 m)	250 lb (113 kg)	1969–03–14	UNLV
G	20	Pete Myers	6 ft 6 in (1.98 m)	180 lb (82 kg)	1963–09–15	Little Rock
C	00	Robert Parish	7 ft 1 in (2.16 m)	230 lb (104 kg)	1953–08–30	Centenary
F	41	Glen Rice	6 ft 7 in (2.01 m)	215 lb (98 kg)	1967–05–28	Michigan
C	25	George Zidek	7 ft 0 in (2.13 m)	250 lb (113 kg)	1973–08–02	UCLA

Coaches
Head coach
- Allan Bristow
Assistant(s)
- Johnny Bach
- T. R. Dunn
- Bill Hanzlik

Legend
- (DP) Unsigned draft pick
- (FA) Free agent
- (S) Suspended
- Injured

Roster
Updated: March 4, 1996

== Regular season ==
=== Season standings ===
Central Division	W	L	PCT	GB	Home	Road	Div	GP
z–Chicago Bulls	72	10	.878	–	39‍–‍2	33‍–‍8	24–4	82
x–Indiana Pacers	52	30	.634	20.0	32‍–‍9	20‍–‍21	19–9	82
x–Cleveland Cavaliers	47	35	.573	25.0	26‍–‍15	21‍–‍20	13–15	82
x–Atlanta Hawks	46	36	.561	26.0	26‍–‍15	20‍–‍21	15–13	82
x–Detroit Pistons	46	36	.561	26.0	30‍–‍11	16‍–‍25	15–13	82
Charlotte Hornets	41	41	.500	31.0	25‍–‍16	16‍–‍25	13–15	82
Milwaukee Bucks	25	57	.305	47.0	14‍–‍27	11‍–‍30	8–20	82
Toronto Raptors	21	61	.256	51.0	15‍–‍26	6‍–‍35	5–23	82

Eastern Conference
#	Team	W	L	PCT	GB	GP
1	z–Chicago Bulls	72	10	.878	–	82
2	y–Orlando Magic	60	22	.732	12.0	82
3	x–Indiana Pacers	52	30	.634	20.0	82
4	x–Cleveland Cavaliers	47	35	.573	25.0	82
5	x–New York Knicks	47	35	.573	25.0	82
6	x–Atlanta Hawks	46	36	.561	26.0	82
7	x–Detroit Pistons	46	36	.561	26.0	82
8	x–Miami Heat	42	40	.512	30.0	82
9	Charlotte Hornets	41	41	.500	31.0	82
10	Washington Bullets	39	43	.476	33.0	82
11	Boston Celtics	33	49	.402	39.0	82
12	New Jersey Nets	30	52	.366	42.0	82
13	Milwaukee Bucks	25	57	.305	47.0	82
14	Toronto Raptors	21	61	.256	51.0	82
15	Philadelphia 76ers	18	64	.220	54.0	82

== Player statistics ==
=== Ragular season ===
Player	POS	GP	GS	MP	REB	AST	STL	BLK	PTS	MPG	RPG	APG	SPG	BPG	PPG
Dell Curry	SG	82	29	2,371	264	176	108	25	1,192	28.9	3.2	2.1	1.3	.3	14.5
Larry Johnson	PF	81	81	3,274	683	355	55	43	1,660	40.4	8.4	4.4	.7	.5	20.5
Glen Rice	SF	79	79	3,142	378	232	91	19	1,710	39.8	4.8	2.9	1.2	.2	21.6
Matt Geiger	C	77	50	2,349	649	60	46	63	866	30.5	8.4	.8	.6	.8	11.2
Robert Parish	C	74	34	1,086	303	29	21	54	290	14.7	4.1	.4	.3	.7	3.9
George Zidek	C	71	21	888	183	16	9	7	281	12.5	2.6	.2	.1	.1	4.0
Darrin Hancock	SF	63	7	838	98	47	28	5	272	13.3	1.6	.7	.4	.1	4.3
Rafael Addison	SF	53	0	516	90	30	9	9	171	9.7	1.7	.6	.2	.2	3.2
Anthony Goldwire	PG	42	8	621	43	112	16	0	231	14.8	1.0	2.7	.4	.0	5.5
Kenny Anderson^{†}	PG	38	36	1,302	102	328	59	6	577	34.3	2.7	8.6	1.6	.2	15.2
Kendall Gill^{†}	SG	36	36	1,265	189	225	42	22	464	35.1	5.3	6.3	1.2	.6	12.9
Pete Myers^{†}	SG	32	1	453	67	48	20	6	92	14.2	2.1	1.5	.6	.2	2.9
Michael Adams	PG	21	3	329	22	67	21	4	114	15.7	1.0	3.2	1.0	.2	5.4
Scott Burrell	SF	20	20	693	98	47	27	13	263	34.7	4.9	2.4	1.4	.7	13.2
Khalid Reeves^{†}	PG	20	5	418	40	72	16	1	162	20.9	2.0	3.6	.8	.1	8.1
Greg Sutton^{†}	PG	18	0	190	15	39	8	0	62	10.6	.8	2.2	.4	.0	3.4
Muggsy Bogues	PG	6	0	77	7	19	2	0	14	12.8	1.2	3.2	.3	.0	2.3
Corey Beck	PG	5	0	33	7	5	1	0	5	6.6	1.4	1.0	.2	.0	1.0
Gerald Glass^{†}	SF	5	0	15	2	0	1	0	5	3.0	.4	.0	.2	.0	1.0
Donald Hodge^{†}	C	2	0	2	1	0	0	0	0	1.0	.5	.0	.0	.0	.0
Joe Wolf^{†}	PF	1	0	18	2	0	2	0	0	18.0	2.0	.0	2.0	.0	.0

- ^{†} Denotes player spent time with another team in the season. Stats reflect time with the Hornets only.

== Transactions ==
- June 24, 1995

Lost Kenny Gattison to the Vancouver Grizzlies in the NBA expansion draft.

- June 27, 1995

Traded Hersey Hawkins and David Wingate to the Seattle SuperSonics for Kendall Gill.

- September 27, 1995

Signed Rafael Addison as an unrestricted free agent.

- October 3, 1995

Signed Pete Myers as an unrestricted free agent.

- October 4, 1995

Signed Corey Beck as a free agent.

Signed Negele Knight as an unrestricted free agent.

- October 24, 1995

Waived Negele Knight.

- November 2, 1995

Waived Corey Beck.

- November 3, 1995

Traded LeRon Ellis, Alonzo Mourning and Pete Myers to the Miami Heat for Matt Geiger, Khalid Reeves, Glen Rice and a 1996 1st round draft pick (Tony Delk was later selected).

- November 6, 1995

Waived Joe Wolf.

- December 23, 1995

Signed Corey Beck to a contract for the rest of the season.

- January 3, 1996

Waived Greg Sutton.

- January 5, 1996

Waived Corey Beck.

- January 19, 1996

Traded Kendall Gill and Khalid Reeves to the New Jersey Nets for Kenny Anderson and Gerald Glass.

- January 22, 1996

Signed Anthony Goldwire to a 10-day contract.

- January 31, 1996

Signed Anthony Goldwire to a contract for the rest of the season.

- February 16, 1996

Signed Pete Myers as a free agent.

- February 22, 1996

Waived Gerald Glass.

- February 23, 1996

Signed Donald Hodge to a 10-day contract.

- March 4, 1996

Released Donald Hodge.

Player transactions citation:
