= 1995–96 Boston Celtics season =

NBA basketball team season

- Head coach: M. L. Carr
- General manager: Jan Volk
- Owner: Paul Gaston
- Arena: Fleet Center

Results
- Record: 33–49 (.402)
- Place: Division: 5th (Atlantic); Conference: 11th (Eastern)
- Playoff finish: Did not qualify
- Stats at Basketball Reference

Local media
- Television: WSBK-TV; SportsChannel New England
- Radio: WRKO

The 1995–96 Boston Celtics season was the 50th season for the Boston Celtics in the National Basketball Association.

== Season summary ==
=== Off-season ===
A new era began for the Celtics as the team moved into a new arena known as the FleetCenter. In addition, this also ended their practice of playing occasional home games at the Hartford Civic Center in Hartford, Connecticut.

The Celtics had the 14th overall pick in the 1995 NBA draft, and selected small forward Eric Williams out of Providence College. There was much speculation during the previous off-season over who would coach the team after the firing of Chris Ford, with candidates that included former Celtics coaches Dave Cowens and K. C. Jones, and even former Celtic player Paul Silas. Ultimately, General Manager M. L. Carr decided to hire himself as the team's new head coach. The Celtics also signed free agent All-Star guard, and former Boston College star Dana Barros, who won the NBA Most Improved Player of the Year award the previous season with the Philadelphia 76ers.

=== Regular season ===
Under Carr, and with the addition of Barros and Williams, the Celtics started the regular season losing their first game at the Fleet Center, 101–100 to the Milwaukee Bucks on November 3, 1995. Near the end of the month, the team traded Sherman Douglas to the Bucks in exchange for Todd Day and Alton Lister. The Celtics played around .500 in winning percentage with a 12–12 start to the season, but then struggled losing 15 of their next 18 games, and later on holding a 17–30 record at the All-Star break. The Celtics finished in fifth place in the Atlantic Division with a 33–49 record, and failed to qualify for the NBA playoffs.

Dino Radja averaged 19.7 points, 9.8 rebounds and 1.5 blocks per game, but only played 53 games due to a season-ending ankle injury, while Rick Fox averaged 14.0 points, 5.6 rebounds, 4.6 assists and 1.4 steals per game, and Barros provided the team with 13.0 points and 3.8 assists per game, and also led them with 150 three-point field goals. In addition, David Wesley contributed 12.3 points and 4.8 assists per game, along with 116 three-point field goals, while Day contributed 12.0 points per game in 71 games after the trade, Dee Brown provided with 10.7 points and 1.2 steals per game, Williams averaged 10.7 points per game, and second-year guard Greg Minor contributed 9.6 points per game. On the defensive side, second-year center Eric Montross averaged 7.2 points and 5.8 rebounds per game, but only played 61 games due to a sprained ankle, and Pervis Ellison provided with 5.3 points, 6.5 rebounds and 1.4 blocks per game.

During the NBA All-Star weekend at the Alamodome in San Antonio, Texas, Barros participated in the NBA Three-Point Shootout for the fourth consecutive year, while Williams was selected for the NBA Rookie Game, as a member of the Eastern Conference Rookie team, and Minor participated in the NBA Slam Dunk Contest. Wesley finished tied in eighth place in Most Improved Player voting.

The Celtics finished ninth in the NBA in home-game attendance, with an attendance of 730,842 at the FleetCenter during the regular season.

=== Aftermath ===
Following the season, Montross was traded to the Dallas Mavericks in exchange for the sixth overall pick in the 1996 NBA draft.

== Draft picks ==
Round	Pick	Player	Position	Nationality	College
1	14	Eric Williams	SF	United States	Providence
2	33	Junior Burrough	SF	United States	Virginia

== Roster ==
1995–96 Boston Celtics roster
Players

Pos.	No.	Player	Height	Weight	DOB	From
G	11	Dana Barros	5 ft 11 in (1.80 m)	163 lb (74 kg)	1967–04–13	Boston College
G	7	Dee Brown	6 ft 1 in (1.85 m)	160 lb (73 kg)	1968–11–29	Jacksonville
F	5	Junior Burrough	6 ft 8 in (2.03 m)	242 lb (110 kg)	1973–01–18	Virginia
G	13	Todd Day	6 ft 6 in (1.98 m)	188 lb (85 kg)	1970–01–07	Arkansas
F	29	Pervis Ellison	6 ft 9 in (2.06 m)	210 lb (95 kg)	1967–04–03	Louisville
F	44	Rick Fox	6 ft 7 in (2.01 m)	230 lb (104 kg)	1969–07–24	North Carolina
C	53	Alton Lister	7 ft 0 in (2.13 m)	240 lb (109 kg)	1958–10–01	Arizona State
G	9	Greg Minor	6 ft 6 in (1.98 m)	210 lb (95 kg)	1971–09–18	Louisville
C	0	Eric Montross (injured)	7 ft 0 in (2.13 m)	270 lb (122 kg)	1971–09–23	North Carolina
C	51	Todd Mundt	7 ft 0 in (2.13 m)	250 lb (113 kg)	1970–05–17	Delta State
F	40	Dino Radja (injured)	6 ft 11 in (2.11 m)	225 lb (102 kg)	1967–04–24	Croatia
F	34	Doug Smith (injured)	6 ft 10 in (2.08 m)	220 lb (100 kg)	1969–09–17	Missouri
G	4	David Wesley	6 ft 0 in (1.83 m)	190 lb (86 kg)	1970–11–14	Baylor
F	55	Eric Williams	6 ft 8 in (2.03 m)	220 lb (100 kg)	1972–07–17	Providence

Coaches
Head coach
- M. L. Carr
Assistant(s)
- Don Casey
- Dennis Johnson
- John Kuester

Legend
- (DP) Unsigned draft pick
- (FA) Free agent
- (S) Suspended
- Injured

Roster

== Regular season ==
=== Season standings ===
Atlantic Division	W	L	PCT	GB	Home	Road	Div	GP
y–Orlando Magic	60	22	.732	12.0	37‍–‍4	23‍–‍18	21–3	82
x–New York Knicks	47	35	.573	25.0	26‍–‍15	21‍–‍20	16–8	82
x–Miami Heat	42	40	.512	30.0	26‍–‍15	16‍–‍25	13–12	82
Washington Bullets	39	43	.476	33.0	25‍–‍16	14‍–‍27	10–14	82
Boston Celtics	33	49	.402	39.0	18‍–‍23	15‍–‍26	12–12	82
New Jersey Nets	30	52	.366	42.0	20‍–‍21	10‍–‍31	8–17	82
Philadelphia 76ers	18	64	.220	54.0	11‍–‍30	7‍–‍34	5–19	82

Eastern Conference
#	Team	W	L	PCT	GB	GP
1	z–Chicago Bulls	72	10	.878	–	82
2	y–Orlando Magic	60	22	.732	12.0	82
3	x–Indiana Pacers	52	30	.634	20.0	82
4	x–Cleveland Cavaliers	47	35	.573	25.0	82
5	x–New York Knicks	47	35	.573	25.0	82
6	x–Atlanta Hawks	46	36	.561	26.0	82
7	x–Detroit Pistons	46	36	.561	26.0	82
8	x–Miami Heat	42	40	.512	30.0	82
9	Charlotte Hornets	41	41	.500	31.0	82
10	Washington Bullets	39	43	.476	33.0	82
11	Boston Celtics	33	49	.402	39.0	82
12	New Jersey Nets	30	52	.366	42.0	82
13	Milwaukee Bucks	25	57	.305	47.0	82
14	Toronto Raptors	21	61	.256	51.0	82
15	Philadelphia 76ers	18	64	.220	54.0	82

== Player statistics ==
Legend
GP	Games played	GS	Games started	MPG	Minutes per game
FG%	Field-goal percentage	3P%	3-point field-goal percentage	FT%	Free-throw percentage
RPG	Rebounds per game	APG	Assists per game	SPG	Steals per game
BPG	Blocks per game	PPG	Points per game

=== Regular season ===
Boston Celtics statistics
Player	GP	GS	MPG	FG%	3P%	FT%	RPG	APG	SPG	BPG	PPG
Dana Barros	80	25	29.1	.470	.408	.884	2.4	3.8	.7	.0	13.0
Dee Brown	65	23	24.5	.399	.309	.854	2.1	2.2	1.2	.2	10.7
Junior Burrough	61	3	8.1	.376		.656	1.8	.2	.2	.2	3.1
Charles Claxton	3	0	2.3	.500		.000	.7	.0	.0	.3	.7
Todd Day^{†}	71	12	23.0	.371	.343	.766	2.8	1.4	1.1	.7	12.0
Sherman Douglas^{†}	10	4	23.4	.429	.143	.625	2.3	3.9	.2	.0	9.8
Pervis Ellison	69	29	20.7	.492		.641	6.5	.9	.6	1.4	5.3
Rick Fox	81	81	32.0	.454	.364	.772	5.6	4.6	1.4	.5	14.0
Thomas Hamilton	11	0	6.4	.290		.389	2.0	.1	.0	.8	2.3
Alton Lister^{†}	57	14	11.4	.490		.629	4.4	.3	.1	.7	2.3
Greg Minor	78	47	22.6	.500	.259	.762	3.3	1.9	.5	.1	9.6
Eric Montross	61	59	23.5	.566		.376	5.8	.7	.3	.5	7.2
Todd Mundt^{†}	9	0	3.7	.333			.3	.1	.1	.1	.7
Dino Rađa	53	52	37.4	.500		.695	9.8	1.6	.9	1.5	19.7
Doug Smith	17	2	5.4	.359		.625	1.3	.2	.2	.0	1.9
Larry Sykes	1	0	2.0				2.0	.0	.0	.0	.0
David Wesley	82	53	25.7	.459	.426	.753	3.2	4.8	1.2	.1	12.3
Eric Williams	64	6	23.0	.441	.300	.671	3.4	1.1	.9	.2	10.7

- ^{†} Denotes player spent time with another team in the season. Stats reflect time with the Celtics only.

Player statistics citation:

== Transactions ==
=== Overview ===
Players Added

Via draft

- Junior Burrough
- Eric Williams

Via free agency

- Dana Barros
- Thomas Hamilton
- Todd Mundt
- Doug Smith

Via trade

- Todd Day
- Alton Lister
Players Lost

Via free agency

- Jay Humphries
- Xavier McDaniel
- Derek Strong

Via trade

- Sherman Douglas

Waived

- Charles Claxton
- Larry Sykes
- Fred Vinson
- Dominique Wilkins

=== Trades ===
November 25, 1995
June 21, 1996
To Boston Celtics

- (United States) Todd Day
- (United States) Alton Lister
To Boston Celtics

- 1996 First-Round Pick
- 1997 First-Round Pick
To Milwaukee Bucks

- (United States) Sherman Douglas
To Dallas Mavericks

- (United States) Eric Montross
- 1996 First-Round Pick

Player transactions citation:

== See also ==
- 1995–96 NBA season
