= 1995–96 Cleveland Cavaliers season =

NBA professional basketball team season

- Head coach: Mike Fratello
- Arena: Gund Arena

Results
- Record: 47–35 (.573)
- Place: Division: 3rd (Central); Conference: 4th (Eastern)
- Playoff finish: First round (lost to Knicks 0–3)
- Stats at Basketball Reference

Local media
- Television: SportsChannel Ohio · WUAB
- Radio: WWWE

The 1995–96 Cleveland Cavaliers season was the 26th season for the Cleveland Cavaliers in the National Basketball Association. This was the first season since 1985–86 that Mark Price was not on the opening day roster.

== Season summary ==
=== Off-season ===
The Cavaliers had the 17th overall pick in the 1995 NBA draft, and selected shooting guard Bob Sura out of Florida State University. During the off-season, the team acquired All-Star guard, and three-point specialist Dan Majerle from the Phoenix Suns, and acquired 2-time Slam Dunk champion Harold Miner from the Miami Heat.

=== Regular season ===
Despite the addition of Majerle and Sura, the Cavaliers struggled losing their first seven games of the regular season. After the first two games, Tyrone Hill was seriously injured in a car accident and missed 38 games; however, Hill eventually returned in the second half of the season playing off the bench, being replaced by Michael Cage as the team's starting center. The Cavaliers played above .500 in winning percentage for the remainder of the season, and held a 26–20 record at the All-Star break. The team posted an eight-game winning streak between January and February, and posted a 10–2 record in February. The Cavaliers finished in third place in the Central Division with a 47–35 record, earned the fourth seed in the Eastern Conference, and qualified for the NBA playoffs for the fifth consecutive year.

Terrell Brandon continued to show improvement, averaging 19.3 points, 6.5 assists and 1.8 steals per game, while Chris Mills averaged 15.1 points and 5.5 rebounds per game, and Bobby Phills provided the team with 14.6 points, 3.8 assists and 1.4 steals per game, and was named to the NBA All-Defensive Second Team. In addition, Danny Ferry became the team's starting power forward, and contributed 13.3 points per game and 143 three-point field goals, while Majerle played a sixth man role off the bench, averaging 10.6 points per game, and leading the Cavaliers with 146 three-point field goals, and Cage provided with 6.0 points and 8.9 rebounds per game. Off the bench, Hill averaged 7.8 points and 5.5 rebounds per game, and Sura contributed 5.3 points and 2.9 assists per game.

During the NBA All-Star weekend at the Alamodome in San Antonio, Texas, Brandon was selected for the 1996 NBA All-Star Game, as a member of the Eastern Conference All-Star team; it was his first ever All-Star appearance. Meanwhile, Sura was selected for the NBA Rookie Game, as a member of the Eastern Conference Rookie team. Brandon finished tied in 16th place in Most Valuable Player voting, and also finished tied in third place along with Ferry in Most Improved Player voting, while Phills finished tied in eighth place, and head coach Mike Fratello finished in second place in Coach of the Year voting, behind Phil Jackson of the Chicago Bulls.

For the second straight season, the Cavaliers were known as a low-scoring, defensive team led by Fratello's slow-paced, defensive coaching style. The team finished 28th in the NBA in scoring averaging 91.1 points per game, while allowing 88.5 points per game from their opponents, which was the best in the league; the Cavaliers' scoring average was the second-lowest during the regular season, as the expansion Vancouver Grizzlies finished last in the league averaging 89.8 points per game.

The Cavaliers finished eleventh in the NBA in home-game attendance, with an attendance of 730,095 at the Gund Arena during the regular season.

=== NBA playoffs ===
In the Eastern Conference First Round of the 1996 NBA playoffs, and for the second consecutive year, the Cavaliers faced off against the 5th–seeded New York Knicks, who were led by All-Star center Patrick Ewing, Anthony Mason and John Starks. Despite both teams finishing with the same regular-season record, the Cavaliers had home-court advantage in the series. However, the Cavaliers lost the first two games to the Knicks at home at the Gund Arena, before losing Game 3 on the road, 81–76 at Madison Square Garden, thus losing the series in a three-game sweep.

=== Aftermath ===
Following the season, Majerle signed as a free agent with the Miami Heat after only one season with the Cavaliers, while Cage signed with the Philadelphia 76ers, and Miner retired after four seasons in the NBA due to injuries, only playing just 19 games with the Cavaliers this season due to a knee injury. After missing the previous two seasons due to a back injury, former All-Star center Brad Daugherty also retired, ending his eight-year career in the NBA with the Cavaliers.

== Draft picks ==
Round	Pick	Player	Position	Nationality	School/Club team
1	17	Bob Sura	Guard	United States	Florida State
2	39	Donny Marshall	Forward	United States	UConn

== Roster ==
1995–96 Cleveland Cavaliers roster
Players

Pos.	No.	Player	Height	Weight	DOB	From
C	13	John Amaechi	6 ft 10 in (2.08 m)	270 lb (122 kg)	1970–11–26	Penn State
G	1	Terrell Brandon	5 ft 11 in (1.80 m)	180 lb (82 kg)	1970–05–20	Oregon
C	44	Michael Cage	6 ft 9 in (2.06 m)	244 lb (111 kg)	1962–01–28	San Diego State
G	11	John Crotty	6 ft 1 in (1.85 m)	185 lb (84 kg)	1969–07–15	Virginia
C	43	Brad Daugherty (IN)	7 ft 0 in (2.13 m)	245 lb (111 kg)	1965–10–19	North Carolina
F	35	Danny Ferry	6 ft 10 in (2.08 m)	230 lb (104 kg)	1966–10–17	Duke
F	32	Tyrone Hill	6 ft 9 in (2.06 m)	240 lb (109 kg)	1968–03–19	Xavier
G	30	Darryl Johnson	6 ft 1 in (1.85 m)	170 lb (77 kg)	1965–10–26	Michigan State
F	21	Antonio Lang	6 ft 8 in (2.03 m)	205 lb (93 kg)	1972–05–15	Duke
G	9	Dan Majerle	6 ft 6 in (1.98 m)	222 lb (101 kg)	1965–09–09	Central Michigan
F	33	Donny Marshall	6 ft 7 in (2.01 m)	230 lb (104 kg)	1972–07–17	Connecticut
F	24	Chris Mills	6 ft 6 in (1.98 m)	215 lb (98 kg)	1970–01–25	Arizona
G	4	Harold Miner	6 ft 5 in (1.96 m)	210 lb (95 kg)	1971–05–05	USC
G	14	Bobby Phills	6 ft 5 in (1.96 m)	200 lb (91 kg)	1969–12–20	Southern
G	3	Bob Sura	6 ft 5 in (1.96 m)	200 lb (91 kg)	1973–03–25	Florida State

Coaches
Head coach
- Mike Fratello
Assistant(s)
- Jim Boylan
- Sidney Lowe
- Ron Rothstein

Legend
- (DP) Unsigned draft pick
- (FA) Free agent
- (S) Suspended
- (IN) Inactive
- Injured

Roster
Updated: March 5, 1996

=== Roster notes ===
- Center Brad Daugherty was on the injured reserve list due to a back injury, and missed the entire regular season.

== Regular season ==
=== Season standings ===
Central Division	W	L	PCT	GB	Home	Road	Div	GP
z–Chicago Bulls	72	10	.878	–	39‍–‍2	33‍–‍8	24–4	82
x–Indiana Pacers	52	30	.634	20.0	32‍–‍9	20‍–‍21	19–9	82
x–Cleveland Cavaliers	47	35	.573	25.0	26‍–‍15	21‍–‍20	13–15	82
x–Atlanta Hawks	46	36	.561	26.0	26‍–‍15	20‍–‍21	15–13	82
x–Detroit Pistons	46	36	.561	26.0	30‍–‍11	16‍–‍25	15–13	82
Charlotte Hornets	41	41	.500	31.0	25‍–‍16	16‍–‍25	13–15	82
Milwaukee Bucks	25	57	.305	47.0	14‍–‍27	11‍–‍30	8–20	82
Toronto Raptors	21	61	.256	51.0	15‍–‍26	6‍–‍35	5–23	82

Eastern Conference
#	Team	W	L	PCT	GB	GP
1	z–Chicago Bulls	72	10	.878	–	82
2	y–Orlando Magic	60	22	.732	12.0	82
3	x–Indiana Pacers	52	30	.634	20.0	82
4	x–Cleveland Cavaliers	47	35	.573	25.0	82
5	x–New York Knicks	47	35	.573	25.0	82
6	x–Atlanta Hawks	46	36	.561	26.0	82
7	x–Detroit Pistons	46	36	.561	26.0	82
8	x–Miami Heat	42	40	.512	30.0	82
9	Charlotte Hornets	41	41	.500	31.0	82
10	Washington Bullets	39	43	.476	33.0	82
11	Boston Celtics	33	49	.402	39.0	82
12	New Jersey Nets	30	52	.366	42.0	82
13	Milwaukee Bucks	25	57	.305	47.0	82
14	Toronto Raptors	21	61	.256	51.0	82
15	Philadelphia 76ers	18	64	.220	54.0	82

=== Game log ===
1995–96 game log
Total: 47–35 (home: 26–15; road: 21–20)
November: 6–8 (home: 3–4; road: 3–4)

Game	Date	Team	Score	High points	High rebounds	High assists	Location Attendance	Record

December : 9–4 (home: 7–2; road: 2–2)

Game	Date	Team	Score	High points	High rebounds	High assists	Location Attendance	Record

January : 8–8 (home: 3–2; road: 5–6)

Game	Date	Team	Score	High points	High rebounds	High assists	Location Attendance	Record

February : 10–2 (home: 7–1; road: 3–1)

Game	Date	Team	Score	High points	High rebounds	High assists	Location Attendance	Record

March : 8–9 (home: 3–4; road: 5–5)

Game	Date	Team	Score	High points	High rebounds	High assists	Location Attendance	Record

April : 6–4 (home: 3–2; road: 3–2)

Game	Date	Team	Score	High points	High rebounds	High assists	Location Attendance	Record

1995–96 schedule

== Playoffs ==
1996 playoff game log
First round: 0–3 (home: 0–2; road: 0–1)

Game	Date	Team	Score	High points	High rebounds	High assists	Location Attendance	Series
1	April 25	New York	L 83–106	Terrell Brandon (18)	Michael Cage (8)	Brandon, Majerle (5)	Gund Arena; 16,419	0–1
2	April 27	New York	L 80–84	Terrell Brandon (21)	Michael Cage (8)	Terrell Brandon (12)	Gund Arena; 17,232	0–2
3	May 1	@ New York	L 76–81	Terrell Brandon (19)	Michael Cage (12)	Terrell Brandon (7)	Madison Square Garden; 19,763	0–3

1996 schedule

== Player stats ==
Legend
GP	Games played	GS	Games started	MPG	Minutes per game
FG%	Field-goal percentage	3P%	3-point field-goal percentage	FT%	Free-throw percentage
RPG	Rebounds per game	APG	Assists per game	SPG	Steals per game
BPG	Blocks per game	PPG	Points per game

=== Regular season ===
Player	GP	GS	MPG	FG%	3P%	FT%	RPG	APG	SPG	BPG	PPG
Terrell Brandon	75	75	34.3	46.5	38.7	88.7	3.3	6.5	1.8	0.4	19.3
Chris Mills	80	80	38.3	46.8	37.6	82.9	5.5	2.4	0.9	0.7	15.1
Bobby Phills	72	69	35.1	46.7	44.1	77.5	3.6	3.8	1.4	0.4	14.6
Danny Ferry	82	79	32.7	45.9	39.4	76.9	3.8	2.3	0.7	0.5	13.3
Dan Majerle	82	15	28.9	40.5	35.3	71.0	3.7	2.6	1.0	0.4	10.6
Tyrone Hill	44	2	21.1	51.2	0.0	60.0	5.5	0.8	0.7	0.5	7.8
Michael Cage	82	80	32.1	55.6	0.0	54.3	8.9	0.6	1.1	1.0	6.0
Bob Sura	79	3	14.6	41.1	34.6	70.2	1.7	2.9	0.7	0.3	5.3
Harold Miner	19	0	7.2	44.2	20.0	100.0	0.6	0.4	0.0	0.0	3.2
John Crotty	58	4	10.6	44.7	29.6	86.1	0.9	1.8	0.4	0.1	3.0
John Amaechi	28	3	12.8	41.4	0.0	57.6	1.9	0.3	0.2	0.4	2.8
Antonio Lang	41	0	9.0	53.2	0.0	72.3	1.3	0.3	0.3	0.3	2.8
Donny Marshall	34	0	6.1	35.3	23.3	62.9	0.8	0.2	0.2	0.1	2.3
Joe Courtney	23	0	8.7	42.9	0.0	44.4	2.1	0.4	0.2	0.3	1.7
Darryl Johnson	11	0	2.5	41.7	0.0	100.0	0.2	0.1	0.0	0.0	1.1

=== Playoffs ===
Player	GP	GS	MPG	FG%	3P%	FT%	RPG	APG	SPG	BPG	PPG
Terrell Brandon	3	3	41.7	44.7	33.3	86.7	3.0	8.0	1.3	0.3	19.3
Dan Majerle	3	0	30.3	44.4	43.5	88.9	4.0	3.0	1.3	0.7	16.7
Danny Ferry	3	3	39.0	34.1	6.3	0.0	5.0	3.0	1.0	0.7	9.7
Bobby Phills	3	3	32.0	37.1	20.0	25.0	4.7	2.0	0.7	0.3	9.7
Tyrone Hill	3	0	17.7	75.0	0.0	77.8	5.0	0.0	0.0	0.0	8.3
Chris Mills	3	3	35.0	33.3	0.0	100.0	5.3	1.7	0.7	0.7	7.7
Michael Cage	3	3	33.7	57.1	0.0	60.0	9.3	0.7	0.7	1.7	6.3
Bob Sura	3	0	6.0	66.7	0.0	0.0	0.3	1.0	0.3	0.0	1.3
John Crotty	2	0	4.5	0.0	0.0	100.0	0.5	0.5	0.5	0.5	1.0
John Amaechi	1	0	2.0	0.0	0.0	0.0	0.0	0.0	0.0	0.0	0.0
Antonio Lang	1	0	2.0	0.0	0.0	0.0	0.0	0.0	0.0	0.0	0.0
Donny Marshall	1	0	1.0	0.0	0.0	0.0	0.0	0.0	0.0	0.0	0.0

Player statistics citation:
