= 1995–96 Atlanta Hawks season =

NBA professional basketball team season

- Head coach: Lenny Wilkens
- General manager: Pete Babcock
- Owners: Ted Turner / Turner Broadcasting System
- Arena: Omni Coliseum

Results
- Record: 46–36 (.561)
- Place: Division: 4th (Central); Conference: 6th (Eastern)
- Playoff finish: Conference semifinals (lost to Magic 1–4)
- Stats at Basketball Reference

Local media
- Television: WATL; SportSouth
- Radio: WCNN

The 1995–96 Atlanta Hawks season was the 47th season for the Atlanta Hawks in the National Basketball Association, and their 28th season in Atlanta, Georgia.

== Season summary ==
=== Off-season ===
The Hawks had the 16th overall pick in the 1995 NBA draft, and selected power forward Alan Henderson out of Indiana University. During the off-season, the team re-acquired former Hawks guard, and one-time Slam Dunk champion Spud Webb from the Sacramento Kings; Webb played for the Hawks from 1985 to 1991. The team also replaced Stacey Augmon as the team's starting small forward with Ken Norman, as Augmon played a sixth man role off the bench for the first half of the regular season.

For the season, the Hawks redesigned their primary logo, adding black and brown to their color scheme of red, yellow and white; the team's primary logo featured a red hawk with a yellow beak and black shadows, spreading its wings and holding a brown basketball below the city and team name in red letters. The Hawks also redesigned their home and road uniforms, which featured the their primary logo of a hawk on the front of their jerseys below the team name "Hawks", with the jersey number on the upper left side of their jerseys, and a red side panel with the jersey number on the left leg of their shorts. The white home uniforms featured a red, yellow and black trim, and yellow and black outlines next to the side panel on the left leg of their shorts, while the road uniforms were changed from red to a black-to-red fade gradient, and featured a black, yellow and red trim and yellow outlines; their road jerseys were black at the top and faded into red at the bottom, while their shorts were red at the top and faded into black at the bottom.

The team's new primary logo would remain in use until 2007, while the basic design of the logo would last until 2015; the new home and road uniforms would both remain in use until 1999.

=== Regular season ===
With the addition of Henderson and Webb, the Hawks got off to a 9–5 start to the regular season, but soon struggled losing 10 of their 14 games in December, falling below .500 in winning percentage with a 13–15 record at the end of the month. After 28 games, Norman was benched as Augmon returned to the lineup for the remainder of the regular season, as the Hawks posted a 10-game winning streak in January, and later on held a 26–21 record at the All-Star break. At mid-season, the team traded Webb, and Andrew Lang to the Minnesota Timberwolves in exchange for Christian Laettner, and Sean Rooks. The Hawks finished in fourth place in the Central Division with a 46–36 record, and earned the sixth seed in the Eastern Conference.

Steve Smith averaged 18.1 points per game and contributed 140 three-point field goals, while Mookie Blaylock averaged 15.7 points, 5.9 assists and 2.6 steals per game, led the Hawks with 231 three-point field goals, and was named to the NBA All-Defensive Second Team, and Laettner provided the team with 14.2 points and 7.9 rebounds per game in 30 games after the trade. In addition, Grant Long provided with 13.1 points, 9.6 rebounds and 1.3 steals per game, while Augmon contributed 12.7 points and 1.4 steals per game, Craig Ehlo contributed 8.5 points per game, and Henderson averaged 6.4 points and 4.5 rebounds per game. Norman averaged 8.9 points and 3.9 rebounds per game in only just 34 games, and did not participate in the NBA playoffs, despite not being injured; Norman feuded with head coach Lenny Wilkens during the regular season after being removed from the team's starting lineup.

During the NBA All-Star weekend at the Alamodome in San Antonio, Texas, Henderson was selected for the NBA Rookie Game, as a member of the Eastern Conference Rookie team. One notable highlight of the regular season occurred on March 1, 1996, when Wilkens reached a significant milestone, becoming the first NBA coach ever to reach 1,000 victories, as the Hawks defeated his former team, the Cleveland Cavaliers, 74–68 at home at the Omni Coliseum. Wilkens also finished in sixth place in Coach of the Year voting.

The Hawks finished 27th in the NBA in home-game attendance, with an attendance of 496,668 at the Omni Coliseum during the regular season, which was the third-lowest in the league.

=== NBA playoffs ===
In the Eastern Conference First Round of the 1996 NBA playoffs, and for the third consecutive year, the Hawks faced off against the 3rd–seeded Indiana Pacers; All-Star guard Reggie Miller was out for most of the series due to an eye socket injury, as the Pacers were led by Rik Smits, Derrick McKey and Mark Jackson. The Hawks took a 2–1 series lead before losing Game 4 to the Pacers at home, 83–75 at the Omni Coliseum. With the series tied at 2–2, and despite the return of Miller, the Hawks managed to win Game 5 over the Pacers on the road, 89–87 at the Market Square Arena to win in a hard-fought five-game series.

In the Eastern Conference Semi-finals, the team faced off against the 2nd–seeded, and Atlantic Division champion Orlando Magic, who were led by the trio of All-Star center Shaquille O'Neal, All-Star guard Penny Hardaway, and Horace Grant. The Magic won the first three games to take a 3–0 series lead, but the Hawks managed to win Game 4 at the Omni Coliseum, 104–99, in which Smith scored 35 points, and made 7 out of 14 three-point field-goal attempts. However, the Hawks lost Game 5 to the Magic on the road, 96–88 at the Orlando Arena, thus losing the series in five games.

=== Aftermath ===
Following the season, Augmon and Long were both traded to the Detroit Pistons, while Ehlo signed as a free agent with the Seattle SuperSonics, and Rooks signed with the Los Angeles Lakers.

== Draft picks ==
Round	Pick	Player	Position	Nationality	College
1	16	Alan Henderson	PF	United States	Indiana
2	42	Donnie Boyce	SG	United States	Colorado
2	45	Troy Brown	PF/C	United States	Providence

== Roster ==
1995–96 Atlanta Hawks roster
Players

Pos.	No.	Player	Height	Weight	DOB	From
F	2	Stacey Augmon	6 ft 8 in (2.03 m)	205 lb (93 kg)	1968–08–01	UNLV
G	10	Mookie Blaylock	6 ft 0 in (1.83 m)	180 lb (82 kg)	1967–03–20	Oklahoma
G	24	Donnie Boyce	6 ft 5 in (1.96 m)	196 lb (89 kg)	1973–09–02	Colorado
F	50	Matt Bullard	6 ft 10 in (2.08 m)	215 lb (98 kg)	1967–06–05	Iowa
G	3	Craig Ehlo	6 ft 6 in (1.98 m)	180 lb (82 kg)	1961–08–11	Washington State
F	44	Alan Henderson	6 ft 9 in (2.06 m)	235 lb (107 kg)	1972–12–02	Indiana
G	22	Reggie Jordan	6 ft 4 in (1.93 m)	195 lb (88 kg)	1968–01–26	New Mexico State
C	32	Christian Laettner	6 ft 11 in (2.11 m)	235 lb (107 kg)	1969–08–17	Duke
F	43	Grant Long	6 ft 8 in (2.03 m)	225 lb (102 kg)	1966–03–12	Eastern Michigan
F	5	Ken Norman (injured)	6 ft 8 in (2.03 m)	215 lb (98 kg)	1964–09–05	Illinois
C	45	Sean Rooks	6 ft 10 in (2.08 m)	250 lb (113 kg)	1969–09–09	Arizona
G	8	Steve Smith	6 ft 7 in (2.01 m)	200 lb (91 kg)	1969–03–31	Michigan State

Coaches
Head coach
- Lenny Wilkens
Assistant(s)
- Dick Helm
- Jerry Powell
- Gary Wortman

Legend
- (DP) Unsigned draft pick
- (FA) Free agent
- (S) Suspended
- Injured

Roster

== Regular season ==
=== Season standings ===
Central Division	W	L	PCT	GB	Home	Road	Div	GP
z–Chicago Bulls	72	10	.878	–	39‍–‍2	33‍–‍8	24–4	82
x–Indiana Pacers	52	30	.634	20.0	32‍–‍9	20‍–‍21	19–9	82
x–Cleveland Cavaliers	47	35	.573	25.0	26‍–‍15	21‍–‍20	13–15	82
x–Atlanta Hawks	46	36	.561	26.0	26‍–‍15	20‍–‍21	15–13	82
x–Detroit Pistons	46	36	.561	26.0	30‍–‍11	16‍–‍25	15–13	82
Charlotte Hornets	41	41	.500	31.0	25‍–‍16	16‍–‍25	13–15	82
Milwaukee Bucks	25	57	.305	47.0	14‍–‍27	11‍–‍30	8–20	82
Toronto Raptors	21	61	.256	51.0	15‍–‍26	6‍–‍35	5–23	82

Eastern Conference
#	Team	W	L	PCT	GB	GP
1	z–Chicago Bulls	72	10	.878	–	82
2	y–Orlando Magic	60	22	.732	12.0	82
3	x–Indiana Pacers	52	30	.634	20.0	82
4	x–Cleveland Cavaliers	47	35	.573	25.0	82
5	x–New York Knicks	47	35	.573	25.0	82
6	x–Atlanta Hawks	46	36	.561	26.0	82
7	x–Detroit Pistons	46	36	.561	26.0	82
8	x–Miami Heat	42	40	.512	30.0	82
9	Charlotte Hornets	41	41	.500	31.0	82
10	Washington Bullets	39	43	.476	33.0	82
11	Boston Celtics	33	49	.402	39.0	82
12	New Jersey Nets	30	52	.366	42.0	82
13	Milwaukee Bucks	25	57	.305	47.0	82
14	Toronto Raptors	21	61	.256	51.0	82
15	Philadelphia 76ers	18	64	.220	54.0	82

=== Game log ===
1995–96 game log
Total: 46–36 (home: 26–15; road: 20–21)
November: 9–5 (home: 4–2; road: 5–3)

Game	Date	Team	Score	High points	Location Attendance	Record
1	November 3	Indiana Pacers	L 106-111		Omni Coliseum	0–1
2	November 4	Orlando Magic	W 124-91		Omni Coliseum	1-1
3	November 6	@ Utah Jazz	L 96-105		Delta Center	1–2
4	November 8	@ Los Angeles Clippers	W 100-92		Los Angeles Memorial Sports Arena	2-2
5	November 9	@ Golden State Warriors	W 125-121		Oakland Coliseum Arena	3–2
6	November 11	@ Dallas Mavericks	W 113-100		Reunion Arena	4–2
7	November 14	Charlotte Hornets	W 111-104		Omni Coliseum	5–2
8	November 17	Miami Heat	L 88-91		Omni Coliseum	5–3
9	November 19	@ Sacramento Kings	W 108-94		ARCO Arena	6–3
10	November 21	@ Denver Nuggets	L 99-107		McNichols Sports Arena	6–4
11	November 22	@ Phoenix Suns	L 112-117		America West Arena	6–5
12	November 25	Toronto Raptors	W 114-102		Omni Coliseum	7–5
13	November 28	@ New York Knicks	W 102-97 (OT)		Madison Square Garden	8–5
14	November 29	Philadelphia 76ers	W 106-81		Omni Coliseum	9–5

December: 4–10 (home: 3–6; road: 1–4)

Game	Date	Team	Score	High points	Location Attendance	Record
15	December 1	Dallas Mavericks	L 98-106		Omni Coliseum	9–6
16	December 2	@ Detroit Pistons	L 96-104		The Palace Of Auburn Hills	9–7
17	December 6	@ Washington Bullets	L 79-96		US Airways Arena	9–8
18	December 7	San Antonio Spurs	L 102-104		Omni Coliseum	9-9
19	December 9	New York Knicks	L 92-101		Omni Coliseum	9–10
20	December	@ Boston Celtics	W 108-103		Fleet Center	10-10
21	December 12	Minnesota Timberwolves	L 78-85		Omni Coliseum	10–11
22	December 14	Chicago Bulls	L 108-127		Omni Coliseum	10–12
23	December 16	Denver Nuggets	W 95-86		Omni Coliseum	11–12
24	December 22	New Jersey Nets	W 94-91		Omni Coliseum	12-12
25	December 23	@ Milwaukee Bucks	L 111-115		Bradley Center	12–13
26	December 26	Los Angeles Clippers	W 94-88		Omni Coliseum	13-13
27	December 29	Golden State Warriors	L 96-117		Omni Coliseum	13–14
28	December 30	@ Chicago Bulls	L 93-95		United Center	13–15

January: 11–4 (home: 8–2; road: 3–2)

Game	Date	Team	Score	High points	Location Attendance	Record
29	January 2	Seattle SuperSonics	L 88-111		Omni Coliseum	13–16
30	January 4	Toronto Raptors	W 104-101 (OT)		Omni Coliseum	14–16
31	January 6	@ Charlotte Hornets	L 90-96		Charlotte Coliseum	14–17
32	January 9	Sacramento Kings	W 104-88		Omni Coliseum	15–17
33	January 11	@ Toronto Raptors	W 87-79		SkyDome	16–17
34	January 13	Boston Celtics	W 108-105		Omni Coliseum	17-17
35	January 15	Detroit Pistons	W 96-88		Omni Coliseum	18–17
36	January 17	Indiana Pacers	W 102-93		Omni Coliseum	19–17
37	January 19	@ Philadelphia 76ers	W 82-77		Spectrum	20–17
38	January 20	Miami Heat	W 98-78		Omni Coliseum	21–17
39	January 22	Houston Rockets	W 105-96		Omni Coliseum	22–17
40	January 23	@ Cleveland Cavaliers	W 84-72		Gund Arena	23–17
41	January 26	Orlando Magic	W 96-84		Omni Coliseum	24–17
42	January 30	@ Indiana Pacers	L 90-107		Market Square Arena	24–18
43	January 31	Phoenix Suns	L 84-120		Omni Coliseum	24–19

February: 7–5 (home: 3–1; road: 4–4)

Game	Date	Team	Score	High points	Location Attendance	Record
44	February 2	@ Orlando Magic	L 95-108		Orlando Arena	24–20
45	February 4	Charlotte Hornets	W 106-104		Omni Coliseum	25–20
46	February 7	@ Miami Heat	L 89-101		Miami Arena	25–21
47	February 8	Washington Bullets	W 98-92		Omni Coliseum	26–21
48	February 14	@ Los Angeles Lakers	L 86-87		Great Western Forum	26–22
49	February 16	@ Vancouver Grizzlies	W 110-100		General Motors Place	27–22
50	February 18	@ Portland Trail Blazers	W 93-90		Rose Garden Arena	28–22
51	February 19	@ Seattle SuperSonics	L 94-102		KeyArena at Seattle Center	28–23
52	February 22	Chicago Bulls	L 91-96		Omni Coliseum	28–24
53	February 23	@ New York Knicks	W 108-97		Madison Square Garden	29–24
54	February 25	@ Minnesota Timberwolves	W 92-76		Target Center	30–24
55	February 28	Portland Trail Blazers	W 90-88		Omni Coliseum	31–24

March: 9–7 (home: 5–1; road: 4–6)

Game	Date	Team	Score	High points	Location Attendance	Record
56	March 1	Cleveland Cavaliers	W 74-68		Omni Coliseum	32–24
57	March 2	@ Milwaukee Bucks	L 106-110		Bradley Center	32–25
58	March 4	@ Detroit Pistons	L 93-99		The Palace Of Auburn Hills	32–26
59	March 7	@ Cleveland Cavaliers	W 83-72		Gund Arena	33–26
60	March 8	Milwaukee Bucks	W 94-91		Omni Coliseum	34–26
61	March 10	@ Washington Bullets	L 91-99		US Airways Arena	34–27
62	March 12	Utah Jazz	W 115-89		Omni Coliseum	35–27
63	March 14	@ Houston Rockets	L 106-114		The Summit	35–28
64	March 16	@ San Antonio Spurs	L 92-119		Alamodome	35–29
65	March 20	Vancouver Grizzlies	W 98-93		Omni Coliseum	36–29
66	March 22	@ Charlotte Hornets	W 117-92		Charlotte Coliseum	37–29
67	March 23	Detroit Pistons	W 92-84		Omni Coliseum	38–29
68	March 26	@ Toronto Raptors	W 114-111		SkyDome	39–29
69	March 28	@ Chicago Bulls	L 80-111		United Center	39–30
70	March 29	Los Angeles Lakers	L 89-102		Omni Coliseum	39–31
71	March 31	@ Boston Celtics	W 93-92		Fleet Center	40–31

April: 6–5 (home: 3–3; road: 3–2)

Game	Date	Team	Score	High points	Location Attendance	Record
72	April 2	Boston Celtics	W 109-89		Omni Coliseum	41–31
73	April 4	Washington Bullets	L 110-113		Omni Coliseum	41–32
74	April 5	@ New Jersey Nets	W 82-70		Brendan Byrne Arena	42–32
75	April 6	Philadelphia 76ers	L 99-100		Omni Coliseum	42–33
76	April 8	@ Indiana Pacers	L 95-97		Market Square Arena	42–34
77	April 12	Milwaukee Bucks	W 104-97		Omni Coliseum	43–34
78	April 14	@ New Jersey Nets	W 99-90		Brendan Byrne Arena	44–34
79	April 16	Cleveland Cavaliers	L 77-80		Omni Coliseum	44–35
80	April 18	@ Orlando Magic	L 104-119		Orlando Arena	44–36
81	April 20	New Jersey Nets	W 121-99		Omni Coliseum	45–36
82	April 21	@ Miami Heat	W 104-92		Miami Arena	46–36

1995–96 season schedule

== Playoffs ==
1996 playoff game log
First Round: 3–2 (home: 1–1; road: 2–1)

Game	Date	Team	Score	High points	High rebounds	High assists	Location Attendance	Series
1	April 25	@ Indiana	W 92–80	Steve Smith (27)	Grant Long (14)	Mookie Blaylock (9)	Market Square Arena; 16,438	1–0
2	April 27	@ Indiana	L 94–102 (OT)	Steve Smith (25)	Christian Laettner (9)	Mookie Blaylock (7)	Market Square Arena; 16,709	1–1
3	April 29	Indiana	W 90–83	Steve Smith (26)	Christian Laettner (8)	Mookie Blaylock (7)	Omni Coliseum; 11,290	2–1
4	May 2	Indiana	L 75–83	Steve Smith (19)	Grant Long (12)	Mookie Blaylock (5)	Omni Coliseum; 15,482	2–2
5	May 5	@ Indiana	W 89–87	Mookie Blaylock (23)	Christian Laettner (11)	three players tied (3)	Market Square Arena; 16,731	3–2

Conference semifinals: 1–4 (home: 1–1; road: 0–3)

Game	Date	Team	Score	High points	High rebounds	High assists	Location Attendance	Series
1	May 8	@ Orlando	L 105–117	Stacey Augmon (23)	Alan Henderson (8)	Steve Smith (9)	Orlando Arena; 17,248	0–1
2	May 10	@ Orlando	L 94–120	Mookie Blaylock (25)	Christian Laettner (6)	Steve Smith (5)	Orlando Arena; 17,248	0–2
3	May 12	Orlando	L 96–103	Christian Laettner (26)	Grant Long (13)	Mookie Blaylock (8)	Omni Coliseum; 15,476	0–3
4	May 13	Orlando	W 104–99	Steve Smith (35)	Grant Long (7)	Mookie Blaylock (11)	Omni Coliseum; 12,645	1–3
5	May 15	@ Orlando	L 88–96	Grant Long (24)	Grant Long (13)	Mookie Blaylock (7)	Orlando Arena; 17,248	1–4

1996 schedule

== Player statistics ==
Legend
GP	Games played	GS	Games started	MPG	Minutes per game
FG%	Field-goal percentage	3P%	3-point field-goal percentage	FT%	Free-throw percentage
RPG	Rebounds per game	APG	Assists per game	SPG	Steals per game
BPG	Blocks per game	PPG	Points per game

=== Season ===
Player	GP	GS	MPG	FG%	3P%	FT%	RPG	APG	SPG	BPG	PPG
Stacey Augmon	77	49	29.8	.491	.250	.792	3.9	1.8	1.4	.4	12.7
Mookie Blaylock	81	81	35.7	.405	.371	.747	4.1	5.9	2.6	.2	15.7
Donnie Boyce	8	0	5.1	.391	.500	.500	1.3	.4	.4	.1	3.0
Matt Bullard	46	0	10.0	.407	.361	.800	1.3	.4	.4	.2	3.8
Craig Ehlo	79	8	22.3	.428	.371	.786	3.2	1.7	1.1	.1	8.5
Ron Grandison	4	0	4.8	.500	.000	.	1.5	.3	.0	.0	1.0
Alan Henderson	79	4	17.9	.442	.000	.595	4.5	.6	.6	.5	6.4
Reggie Jordan	24	0	10.3	.507	.	.579	2.2	1.2	.5	.3	3.9
Tim Kempton	3	0	3.7	.	.	.	.7	.3	.0	.0	.0
Christian Laettner	30	27	32.6	.489	.000	.823	7.9	2.3	1.0	.9	14.2
Andrew Lang	51	51	35.6	.454	.000	.805	6.5	1.2	.7	1.7	12.9
Grant Long	82	82	36.7	.471	.360	.763	9.6	2.2	1.3	.4	13.1
Todd Mundt	24	0	4.9	.406	.	.625	1.0	.1	.0	.2	1.3
Howard Nathan	5	0	3.0	.556	.	.750	.0	.4	.6	.0	2.6
Ken Norman	34	28	22.6	.465	.393	.354	3.9	1.9	.4	.5	8.9
Sean Rooks	16	0	13.4	.552	.000	.674	3.2	.6	.3	.9	5.8
Steve Smith	80	80	35.7	.432	.331	.826	4.1	2.8	.9	.2	18.1
Spud Webb	51	0	16.0	.468	.316	.851	1.2	2.7	.5	.0	5.9

=== Playoffs ===
Player	GP	GS	MPG	FG%	3P%	FT%	RPG	APG	SPG	BPG	PPG
Stacey Augmon	10	10	31.4	.486	.000	.825	3.6	2.7	1.1	.6	10.3
Mookie Blaylock	10	10	42.6	.421	.393	.667	4.3	6.4	2.2	.8	17.1
Donnie Boyce	1	0	2.0	.000	.000	.	.	.	.	.	.
Matt Bullard	4	0	12.8	.333	.500	.500	1.5	.	.	.5	3.5
Craig Ehlo	9	0	19.0	.293	.278	.714	2.0	1.0	1.0	.2	4.0
Alan Henderson	10	0	14.5	.575	.	.700	2.7	.7	.1	.4	5.3
Reggie Jordan	10	0	5.9	.538	.	.429	.6	.9	.5	.1	1.7
Christian Laettner	10	10	33.4	.484	.333	.704	6.9	1.5	1.2	1.0	15.7
Grant Long	10	10	36.2	.396	.250	.800	8.6	2.8	.7	.4	11.4
Sean Rooks	10	0	14.0	.571	.	.619	2.7	.7	.4	.4	4.5
Steve Smith	10	10	42.1	.439	.410	.808	4.1	3.2	1.3	1.3	21.7

Player statistics citation:

== Awards and records ==
=== Awards ===
- Mookie Blaylock, NBA All-Defensive Second Team

== Transactions ==
=== Trades ===
February 22, 1996

- Traded Andrew Lang and Spud Webb to the Minnesota Timberwolves for Christian Laettner and Sean Rooks.

=== Free agents ===
October 5, 1995

- Signed Howard Nathan as a free agent.
- Signed Matt Bullard as a free agent.

October 30, 1995

- Signed Todd Mundt as a free agent.
- Waived Cuonzo Martin.
- Waived Gaylon Nickerson.

December 14, 1995

- Signed Tim Kempton as a free agent.
- Waived Howard Nathan.

January 5, 1996

- Waived Tim Kempton.

January 16, 1996

- Signed Ron Grandison as a free agent.

February 22, 1996

- Signed Howard Nathan to a 10-day contract.

March 2, 1996

- Waived Howard Nathan.

March 6, 1996

- Signed Reggie Jordan to the first of two 10-day contracts.

March 9, 1996

- Waived Todd Mundt.

March 26, 1996

- Signed Reggie Jordan to a contract for the rest of the season.

==== Additions ====
Player	Signed	Former team

==== Subtractions ====
Player	Left	New team

Player transactions citation:

== See also ==
- 1995–96 NBA season
