= 1995–96 Washington Bullets season =

NBA professional basketball team season

- Head coach: Jim Lynam
- Arena: US Airways Arena (37 games); Baltimore Arena (4 games)

Results
- Record: 39–43 (.476)
- Place: Division: 4th (Atlantic); Conference: 10th (Eastern)
- Playoff finish: Did not qualify
- Stats at Basketball Reference

Local media
- Television: WBDC; Home Team Sports
- Radio: WTOP

The 1995–96 Washington Bullets season was the 35th season for the Washington Bullets in the National Basketball Association, and their 23rd season in Washington, D.C.

== Season summary ==
=== Off-season ===
The Bullets received the fourth overall pick in the 1995 NBA draft, and selected power forward Rasheed Wallace from the University of North Carolina. During the off-season, the team acquired All-Star guard Mark Price from the Cleveland Cavaliers, acquired Robert Pack from the Denver Nuggets, and signed free agents Tim Legler, Chris Whitney and former Bullets guard Ledell Eackles.

=== Regular season ===
However, the team dealt with injuries all season long; Chris Webber only played just 15 games due to the lingering effect to his injured left shoulder, while Mark Price only appeared in just seven games due to a foot injury, and Pack only played just 31 games due to nerve damage in his right leg. All three players were out for the remainder of the season.

With the addition of Pack, Wallace and Legler, the Bullets got off to a 7–10 start to the regular season, and then posted a five-game winning streak in December afterwards. The team played around .500 in winning percentage for the first half of the season, holding a 22–24 record at the All-Star break. However, the team struggled in February losing 11 of their 14 games during the month, plus posting a six-game losing streak. After a seven-game winning streak, the Bullets lost their final four games of the season, and finished in fourth place in the Atlantic Division with a 39–43 record, which was an impressive 18-game improvement over their previous season; however, the team missed the NBA playoffs for the eighth consecutive year.

Webber averaged 23.7 points, 7.6 rebounds, 5.0 assists and 1.8 steals per game, while second-year star Juwan Howard averaged 22.1 points, 8.1 rebounds and 4.4 assists per game, and was named to the All-NBA Third Team, and Pack provided the team with 18.1 points, 7.8 assists and 2.0 steals per game. In addition, Calbert Cheaney contributed 15.1 points per game, while 7' 7" center Gheorghe Mureșan averaged 14.6 points, 9.6 rebounds and 2.3 blocks per game, led the team in field-goal percentage, and was named the NBA Most Improved Player of the Year, and Wallace provided with 10.1 points and 4.7 rebounds per game, and was named to the NBA All-Rookie Second Team.

Meanwhile, Mark Price's younger brother, Brent Price, contributed 10.0 points and 5.1 assists per game, and led the Bullets with 139 three-point field goals, while off the bench, Legler contributed 9.4 points per game and 128 three-point field goals, and also led the league with .522 in three-point field-goal percentage, and Eackles provided with 8.6 points per game. Mark Price averaged 8.0 points and 2.6 assists per game during his short seven-game stint, while Whitney provided with 7.1 points and 2.4 assists per game in 21 games, Mitchell Butler contributed 3.9 points per game, and second-year center Jim McIlvaine averaged 2.3 points, 2.9 rebounds and 2.1 blocks per game.

During the NBA All-Star weekend at the Alamodome in San Antonio, Texas, Howard was selected for the 1996 NBA All-Star Game, as a member of the Eastern Conference All-Star team; it was his first and only All-Star appearance. Meanwhile, Wallace was selected for the NBA Rookie Game, as a member of the Eastern Conference Rookie team, and Legler won the NBA Three-Point Shootout. Howard also finished tied in 14th place in Most Improved Player voting.

The Bullets finished 18th in the NBA in home-game attendance, with an attendance of 669,598 at USAir Arena during the regular season.

=== Aftermath ===
Following the season, Wallace and Butler were both traded to the Portland Trail Blazers, while Pack signed as a free agent with the New Jersey Nets, and Mark Price signed with the Golden State Warriors. Meanwhile, Brent Price signed with the Houston Rockets, McIlvaine signed with the Seattle SuperSonics, and Eackles was released to free agency.

== Offseason ==
=== Draft picks ===
Round	Pick	Player	Position	Nationality	College
1	4	Rasheed Wallace	PF	United States	North Carolina
2	32	Terrence Rencher	PG	United States	Texas

== Roster ==
1995–96 Washington Bullets roster
Players

Pos.	No.	Player	Height	Weight	DOB	From
G	32	Mitchell Butler	6 ft 5 in (1.96 m)	210 lb (95 kg)	1970–12–15	UCLA
G	40	Calbert Cheaney	6 ft 7 in (2.01 m)	209 lb (95 kg)	1971–07–17	Indiana
G	21	Ledell Eackles	6 ft 5 in (1.96 m)	220 lb (100 kg)	1966–11–24	LSU New Orleans
F	5	Juwan Howard	6 ft 9 in (2.06 m)	240 lb (109 kg)	1973–02–07	Michigan
G	23	Tim Legler	6 ft 4 in (1.93 m)	200 lb (91 kg)	1966–12–16	La Salle
F	55	Bob McCann	6 ft 6 in (1.98 m)	244 lb (111 kg)	1964–04–22	Morehead State
C	22	Jim McIlvaine	7 ft 1 in (2.16 m)	240 lb (109 kg)	1972–07–30	Marquette
C	77	Gheorghe Mureșan	7 ft 7 in (2.31 m)	303 lb (137 kg)	1971–02–14	Romania
G	14	Robert Pack (injured)	6 ft 2 in (1.88 m)	180 lb (82 kg)	1969–02–03	USC
G	20	Brent Price	6 ft 1 in (1.85 m)	165 lb (75 kg)	1968–12–09	Oklahoma
G	15	Mark Price (injured)	6 ft 0 in (1.83 m)	170 lb (77 kg)	1964–02–15	Georgia Tech
F	34	Bob Thornton	6 ft 10 in (2.08 m)	225 lb (102 kg)	1962–07–10	UC Irvine
F	30	Rasheed Wallace (injured)	6 ft 10 in (2.08 m)	225 lb (102 kg)	1974–09–17	North Carolina
F	4	Chris Webber (injured)	6 ft 9 in (2.06 m)	245 lb (111 kg)	1973–03–01	Michigan
G	12	Chris Whitney	6 ft 0 in (1.83 m)	168 lb (76 kg)	1971–10–05	Clemson

Coaches
Head coach
- Jim Lynam
Assistant(s)
- Derek Smith
- Bob Staak

Legend
- (DP) Unsigned draft pick
- (FA) Free agent
- (S) Suspended
- Injured

Roster

== Regular season ==
=== Season standings ===
Atlantic Division	W	L	PCT	GB	Home	Road	Div	GP
y–Orlando Magic	60	22	.732	12.0	37‍–‍4	23‍–‍18	21–3	82
x–New York Knicks	47	35	.573	25.0	26‍–‍15	21‍–‍20	16–8	82
x–Miami Heat	42	40	.512	30.0	26‍–‍15	16‍–‍25	13–12	82
Washington Bullets	39	43	.476	33.0	25‍–‍16	14‍–‍27	10–14	82
Boston Celtics	33	49	.402	39.0	18‍–‍23	15‍–‍26	12–12	82
New Jersey Nets	30	52	.366	42.0	20‍–‍21	10‍–‍31	8–17	82
Philadelphia 76ers	18	64	.220	54.0	11‍–‍30	7‍–‍34	5–19	82

Eastern Conference
#	Team	W	L	PCT	GB	GP
1	z–Chicago Bulls	72	10	.878	–	82
2	y–Orlando Magic	60	22	.732	12.0	82
3	x–Indiana Pacers	52	30	.634	20.0	82
4	x–Cleveland Cavaliers	47	35	.573	25.0	82
5	x–New York Knicks	47	35	.573	25.0	82
6	x–Atlanta Hawks	46	36	.561	26.0	82
7	x–Detroit Pistons	46	36	.561	26.0	82
8	x–Miami Heat	42	40	.512	30.0	82
9	Charlotte Hornets	41	41	.500	31.0	82
10	Washington Bullets	39	43	.476	33.0	82
11	Boston Celtics	33	49	.402	39.0	82
12	New Jersey Nets	30	52	.366	42.0	82
13	Milwaukee Bucks	25	57	.305	47.0	82
14	Toronto Raptors	21	61	.256	51.0	82
15	Philadelphia 76ers	18	64	.220	54.0	82

z – clinched division title
y – clinched division title
x – clinched playoff spot

== Player statistics ==
Legend
GP	Games played	GS	Games started	MPG	Minutes per game
FG%	Field-goal percentage	3P%	3-point field-goal percentage	FT%	Free-throw percentage
RPG	Rebounds per game	APG	Assists per game	SPG	Steals per game
BPG	Blocks per game	PPG	Points per game

=== Regular season ===
Washington Bullets statistics
Player	GP	GS	MPG	FG%	3P%	FT%	RPG	APG	SPG	BPG	PPG
Mitchell Butler	61	3	14.1	.384	.217	.578	1.9	1.1	.7	.2	3.9
Calbert Cheaney	70	70	33.2	.471	.338	.706	3.4	2.2	1.0	.3	15.1
Michael Curry^{†}	5	0	6.8	.300	.000	1.000	1.0	.2	.2	.0	2.0
Ledell Eackles	55	26	22.5	.427	.422	.831	2.7	1.6	.5	.1	8.6
Greg Grant^{†}	10	0	13.8	.393	.200		.6	2.3	.8	.0	2.4
Juwan Howard	81	81	40.7	.489	.308	.749	8.1	4.4	.8	.5	22.1
Tim Legler	77	0	23.1	.507	.522	.863	1.8	1.8	.6	.2	9.4
Cedric Lewis	3	0	1.3	.667			.7	.0	.3	.0	1.3
Bob McCann	62	0	10.5	.497	.500	.473	2.3	.4	.3	.2	3.0
Jim McIlvaine	80	6	14.9	.428		.552	2.9	.1	.3	2.1	2.3
Gheorghe Mureșan	76	76	29.5	.584	.000	.619	9.6	.7	.7	2.3	14.5
Robert Pack	31	31	35.0	.428	.265	.846	4.3	7.8	2.0	.0	18.1
Mike Peplowski^{†}	2	0	2.5				.0	.0	.0	.0	.0
Brent Price	81	50	25.2	.472	.462	.874	2.8	5.1	1.0	.0	10.0
Mark Price	7	1	18.1	.300	.333	1.000	1.0	2.6	.9	.0	8.0
Kevin Pritchard	2	0	11.0	.667	1.000	.667	1.0	3.5	1.0	.0	3.5
Bob Thornton	7	0	4.4	.167		.500	1.7	.0	.1	.0	.4
Rasheed Wallace	65	51	27.5	.487	.329	.650	4.7	1.3	.6	.8	10.1
Chris Webber	15	15	37.2	.543	.441	.594	7.6	5.0	1.8	.6	23.7
Jeff Webster	11	0	5.3	.348	.333		.6	.3	.4	.0	1.6
Chris Whitney	21	0	16.0	.455	.432	.932	1.6	2.4	.9	.0	7.1

- ^{†} Denotes player spent time with another team in the season. Stats reflect time with the Bullets only.

Player statistics citation:

== Awards and records ==
- Gheorge Muresan, NBA Most Improved Player Award
- Juwan Howard, All-NBA Third Team
- Rasheed Wallace, NBA All-Rookie Team 2nd Team

== See also ==
- 1995–96 NBA season
