= 1995–96 Indiana Pacers season =

NBA professional basketball team season

- Head coach: Larry Brown
- General manager: Donnie Walsh
- Owner: Herbert Simon
- Arena: Market Square Arena

Results
- Record: 52–30 (.634)
- Place: Division: 2nd (Central); Conference: 3rd (Eastern)
- Playoff finish: First round (lost to Hawks 2–3)
- Stats at Basketball Reference

Local media
- Television: WTTV; Prime Sports Midwest
- Radio: WIBC

The 1995–96 Indiana Pacers season was the 20th season for the Indiana Pacers in the National Basketball Association, and their 29th season as a franchise.

== Season summary ==
=== Off-season ===
During the off-season, the Pacers signed free agents Ricky Pierce and Eddie Johnson.

=== Regular season ===
With the addition of Pierce and Johnson, the Pacers struggled with a 6–8 start to the regular season, as Rik Smits missed 19 games due to an ankle injury. However, the team posted a 14–2 record in January, which included a seven-game winning streak, and later on held a 31–16 record at the All-Star break. The Pacers won eight of their final nine games of the season, and finished in second place in the Central Division with a 52–30 record, which was the same record as the previous season, earning the third seed in the Eastern Conference; the team qualified for the NBA playoffs for the seventh consecutive year.

Reggie Miller averaged 21.1 points per game and led the Pacers with 168 three-point field goals, and was named to the All-NBA Third Team, while Smits averaged 18.5 points and 6.9 rebounds per game. In addition, Derrick McKey provided the team with 11.7 points and 4.8 rebounds per game, and was named to the NBA All-Defensive Second Team, while Dale Davis provided with 10.3 points, 9.1 rebounds and 1.4 blocks per game, and Mark Jackson contributed 10.0 points and 7.8 assists per game. Off the bench, Pierce contributed 9.7 points per game, while sixth man Antonio Davis averaged 8.8 points and 6.1 rebounds per game, Johnson contributed 7.7 points per game, and Haywood Workman provided with 3.6 points and 2.8 assists per game.

During the NBA All-Star weekend at the Alamodome in San Antonio, Texas, Miller was selected for the 1996 NBA All-Star Game, as a member of the Eastern Conference All-Star team. The Pacers were also the only team in the league to defeat the Chicago Bulls twice during their historic 72–10 season, with a 103–97 home win at the Market Square Arena on December 26, 1995, and a 100–99 road win at the United Center on April 20, 1996. However, during the final month of the regular season, Miller suffered an eye socket injury.

The Pacers finished 17th in the NBA in home-game attendance, with an attendance of 673,967 at the Market Square Arena during the regular season.

=== NBA playoffs ===
In the Eastern Conference First Round of the 1996 NBA playoffs, and for the third consecutive year, the Pacers faced off against the 6th–seeded Atlanta Hawks, a team that featured Steve Smith, Mookie Blaylock and Grant Long. Without Miller, the Pacers used Pierce as their starting shooting guard in his absence. The Hawks took a 2–1 series lead, but the Pacers managed to win Game 4 on the road, 83–75 at the Omni Coliseum to even the series. Miller returned to play in Game 5 at the Market Square Arena, scoring 29 points while wearing protective eye goggles; however, the Pacers lost to the Hawks at home, 89–87, thus losing in a hard-fought five-game series.

=== Notable incidents ===
One notable incident of the regular season occurred on November 10, 1995, during a home game against the Sacramento Kings at the Market Square Arena, in which a brawl occurred. During the third quarter, Dale Davis fouled Kings guard Bobby Hurley hard as he drove into the lane; Kings forward Michael Smith confronted Davis, as both players fought with each other. Players from both teams left the bench to break up the fight. A total of 16 players were fined and suspended; Davis and Smith were both suspended for two games and fined $20,000, while 14 players, seven from each team, were all suspended for one game for leaving the bench during an altercation. 13 of the players that left the bench were all fined $2,500, while Kings center Duane Causwell was fined $7,500, because he did not try to break up the fight.

The Pacers lost to the Kings by a score of 119–95.

=== Aftermath ===
Following the season, Jackson and Pierce were both traded to the Denver Nuggets; although Jackson would eventually return to the Pacers in a mid-season trade during the following season.

== Offseason ==
=== Draft picks ===
Round	Pick	Player	Position	Nationality	College
1	23	Travis Best	PG	United States	Georgia Tech
2	52	Fred Hoiberg	SG	United States	Iowa State

== Roster ==
1995–96 Indiana Pacers roster
Players

Pos.	No.	Player	Height	Weight	DOB	From
G	4	Travis Best	5 ft 11 in (1.80 m)	182 lb (83 kg)	1972–07–12	Georgia Tech
F	50	Adrian Caldwell	6 ft 8 in (2.03 m)	265 lb (120 kg)	1966–07–04	Lamar
F	33	Antonio Davis	6 ft 9 in (2.06 m)	215 lb (98 kg)	1968–10–31	UTEP
F	32	Dale Davis	6 ft 11 in (2.11 m)	230 lb (104 kg)	1969–03–25	Clemson
F	27	Duane Ferrell	6 ft 7 in (2.01 m)	209 lb (95 kg)	1965–09–28	Georgia Tech
G	20	Fred Hoiberg	6 ft 4 in (1.93 m)	203 lb (92 kg)	1972–10–15	Iowa State
G	13	Mark Jackson	6 ft 1 in (1.85 m)	180 lb (82 kg)	1965–04–01	St. John's
F	8	Eddie Johnson	6 ft 7 in (2.01 m)	215 lb (98 kg)	1959–05–01	Illinois
F	9	Derrick McKey	6 ft 9 in (2.06 m)	205 lb (93 kg)	1966–10–10	Alabama
G	31	Reggie Miller	6 ft 7 in (2.01 m)	185 lb (84 kg)	1965–08–24	UCLA
G	22	Ricky Pierce	6 ft 4 in (1.93 m)	205 lb (93 kg)	1959–08–19	Rice
C	55	Dwayne Schintzius	7 ft 1 in (2.16 m)	260 lb (118 kg)	1968–10–14	Florida
C	45	Rik Smits	7 ft 4 in (2.24 m)	250 lb (113 kg)	1966–08–23	Marist
G	3	Haywoode Workman	6 ft 2 in (1.88 m)	180 lb (82 kg)	1966–01–23	Oral Roberts

Coaches
Head coach
- Larry Brown
Assistant(s)
- Herb Brown
- Gar Heard
- Billy King

Legend
- (DP) Unsigned draft pick
- (FA) Free agent
- (S) Suspended
- Injured

Roster

== Regular season ==
=== Season standings ===
Central Division	W	L	PCT	GB	Home	Road	Div	GP
z–Chicago Bulls	72	10	.878	–	39‍–‍2	33‍–‍8	24–4	82
x–Indiana Pacers	52	30	.634	20.0	32‍–‍9	20‍–‍21	19–9	82
x–Cleveland Cavaliers	47	35	.573	25.0	26‍–‍15	21‍–‍20	13–15	82
x–Atlanta Hawks	46	36	.561	26.0	26‍–‍15	20‍–‍21	15–13	82
x–Detroit Pistons	46	36	.561	26.0	30‍–‍11	16‍–‍25	15–13	82
Charlotte Hornets	41	41	.500	31.0	25‍–‍16	16‍–‍25	13–15	82
Milwaukee Bucks	25	57	.305	47.0	14‍–‍27	11‍–‍30	8–20	82
Toronto Raptors	21	61	.256	51.0	15‍–‍26	6‍–‍35	5–23	82

Eastern Conference
#	Team	W	L	PCT	GB	GP
1	z–Chicago Bulls	72	10	.878	–	82
2	y–Orlando Magic	60	22	.732	12.0	82
3	x–Indiana Pacers	52	30	.634	20.0	82
4	x–Cleveland Cavaliers	47	35	.573	25.0	82
5	x–New York Knicks	47	35	.573	25.0	82
6	x–Atlanta Hawks	46	36	.561	26.0	82
7	x–Detroit Pistons	46	36	.561	26.0	82
8	x–Miami Heat	42	40	.512	30.0	82
9	Charlotte Hornets	41	41	.500	31.0	82
10	Washington Bullets	39	43	.476	33.0	82
11	Boston Celtics	33	49	.402	39.0	82
12	New Jersey Nets	30	52	.366	42.0	82
13	Milwaukee Bucks	25	57	.305	47.0	82
14	Toronto Raptors	21	61	.256	51.0	82
15	Philadelphia 76ers	18	64	.220	54.0	82

z – clinched division title
y – clinched division title
x – clinched playoff spot

== Game log ==
=== Regular season ===
1995–96 game log
Total: 52–30 (home: 32–9; road: 20–21)
November: 6–6 (home: 2–3; road: 4–3)

Game	Date	Team	Score	High points	High rebounds	High assists	Location Attendance	Record
1	November 3, 1995	@ Atlanta	W 111–106				The Omni	1–0
2	November 4, 1995	Toronto	W 97–89				Market Square Arena	2–0
3	November 7, 1995	@ Cleveland	W 104–101				Gund Arena	3–0
4	November 9, 1995	@ New York	L 95–103				Madison Square Garden	3–1
5	November 10, 1995	Sacramento	L 95–119				Market Square Arena	3–2
6	November 15, 1995	@ Miami	W 103–97				Miami Arena	4–2
7	November 16, 1995	@ Orlando	L 80–89				Orlando Arena	4–3
8	November 18, 1995	Seattle	W 118–104				Market Square Arena	5–3
9	November 23, 1995	Houston	L 108–115				Market Square Arena	5–4
10	November 24, 1995	Cleveland	L 93–100				Market Square Arena	5–5
11	November 28, 1995	@ Seattle	W 102–101				KeyArena	6–5
12	November 30, 1995	@ Sacramento	L 95–105				ARCO Arena	6–6

December: 9–6 (home: 8–0; road: 1–6)

Game	Date	Team	Score	High points	High rebounds	High assists	Location Attendance	Record
13	December 2, 1995	@ Golden State	L 97–100				Oakland-Alameda County Coliseum Arena	6–7
14	December 3, 1995	@ L.A. Lakers	L 96–104				Great Western Forum	6–8
15	December 5, 1995	Philadelphia	W 108–91				Market Square Arena	7–8
16	December 8, 1995	@ New Jersey	L 89–91				Brendan Byrne Arena	7–9
17	December 10, 1995	L.A. Clippers	W 111–104				Market Square Arena	8–9
18	December 12, 1995	Denver	W 125–92				Market Square Arena	9–9
19	December 14, 1995	@ Toronto	W 102–100				SkyDome	10–9
20	December 15, 1995	Milwaukee	W 112–95				Market Square Arena	11–9
21	December 17, 1995	@ Milwaukee	L 80–84				Bradley Center	11–10
22	December 20, 1995	L.A. Lakers	W 109–98				Market Square Arena	12–10
23	December 22, 1995	Dallas	W 90–79				Market Square Arena	13–10
24	December 23, 1995	@ Cleveland	L 96–97				Gund Arena	13–11
25	December 26, 1995	Chicago	W 103–97				Market Square Arena	14–11
26	December 28, 1995	Miami	W 91–77				Market Square Arena	15–11
27	December 29, 1995	@ Chicago	L 93–120				United Center	15–12

January: 14–2 (home: 7–0; road: 7–2)

Game	Date	Team	Score	High points	High rebounds	High assists	Location Attendance	Record
28	January 2, 1996	@ Denver	W 102–87				McNichols Sports Arena	16–12
29	January 3, 1996	@ L.A. Clippers	W 110–94				Los Angeles Memorial Sports Arena	17–12
30	January 5, 1996	@ San Antonio	W 105–92				Alamodome	18–12
31	January 6, 1996	@ Houston	L 87–99				The Summit	18–13
32	January 9, 1996	@ Dallas	W 91–84				Reunion Arena	19–13
33	January 11, 1996	Milwaukee	W 96–88				Market Square Arena	20–13
34	January 13, 1996	Minnesota	W 103–94				Market Square Arena	21–13
35	January 16, 1996	@ Toronto	W 110–102				SkyDome	22–13
36	January 17, 1996	@ Atlanta	L 93–102				The Omni	22–14
37	January 19, 1996	Detroit	W 89–81				Market Square Arena	23–14
38	January 21, 1996	Washington	W 106–96				Market Square Arena	24–14
39	January 23, 1996	Phoenix	W 117–102				Market Square Arena	25–14
40	January 24, 1996	@ Milwaukee	W 97–89				Bradley Center	26–14
41	January 26, 1996	@ Boston	W 107–90				FleetCenter	27–14
42	January 27, 1996	Orlando	W 102–79				Market Square Arena	28–14
43	January 30, 1996	Atlanta	W 107–90				Market Square Arena	29–14

February: 8–6 (home: 5–3; road: 3–3)

Game	Date	Team	Score	High points	High rebounds	High assists	Location Attendance	Record
44	February 1, 1996	@ Detroit	L 70–87				The Palace of Auburn Hills	29–15
45	February 2, 1996	Boston	W 116–108				Market Square Arena	30–15
46	February 4, 1996	New York	W 90–83				Market Square Arena	31–15
47	February 7, 1996	@ Philadelphia	L 101–102				CoreStates Spectrum	31–16
All-Star Break
48	February 13, 1996	New Jersey	L 92–101				Market Square Arena	31–17
49	February 14, 1996	@ New Jersey	L 87–88				Continental Airlines Arena	31–18
50	February 16, 1996	@ Washington (at Baltimore, MD)	W 95–94				Baltimore Arena	32–18
51	February 18, 1996	Chicago	L 102–110				Market Square Arena	32–19
52	February 21, 1996	Orlando	L 97–99				Market Square Arena	32–20
53	February 23, 1996	Philadelphia	W 102–95				Market Square Arena	33–20
54	February 24, 1996	@ Charlotte	W 104–90				Charlotte Coliseum	34–20
55	February 26, 1996	@ Boston	W 122–119 (OT)				FleetCenter	35–20
56	February 27, 1996	Portland	W 101–87				Market Square Arena	36–20
57	February 29, 1996	Golden State	W 94–85				Market Square Arena	37–20

March: 7–8 (home: 5–2; road: 2–6)

Game	Date	Team	Score	High points	High rebounds	High assists	Location Attendance	Record
58	March 3, 1996	Charlotte	W 103–100				Market Square Arena	38–20
59	March 5, 1996	@ Phoenix	L 95–108				America West Arena	38–21
60	March 6, 1996	@ Utah	L 94–101				Delta Center	38–22
61	March 8, 1996	@ Vancouver	W 94–80				General Motors Place	39–22
62	March 10, 1996	@ Portland	L 108–113 (2OT)				Rose Garden	39–23
63	March 15, 1996	Utah	L 86–95				Market Square Arena	39–24
64	March 17, 1996	Toronto	W 105–96				Market Square Arena	40–24
65	March 19, 1996	@ Charlotte	L 94–102				Charlotte Coliseum	40–25
66	March 20, 1996	@ New York	L 99–102				Madison Square Garden	40–26
67	March 22, 1996	Vancouver	W 111–94				Market Square Arena	41–26
68	March 24, 1996	San Antonio	L 88–100				Market Square Arena	41–27
69	March 26, 1996	Boston	W 103–96				Market Square Arena	42–27
70	March 27, 1996	@ Washington	W 99–93				USAir Arena	43–27
71	March 29, 1996	@ Minnesota	L 91–93				Target Center	43–28
72	March 31, 1996	New Jersey	W 118–100				Market Square Arena	44–28

April: 8–2 (home: 5–1; road: 3–1)

Game	Date	Team	Score	High points	High rebounds	High assists	Location Attendance	Record
73	April 2, 1996	New York	L 86–90				Market Square Arena	44–29
74	April 3, 1996	@ Philadelphia	W 102–87				CoreStates Spectrum	45–29
75	April 6, 1996	Miami	W 99–95				Market Square Arena	46–29
76	April 8, 1996	Atlanta	W 97–95				Market Square Arena	47–29
77	April 12, 1996	@ Orlando	W 111–101				Orlando Arena	48–29
78	April 13, 1996	Detroit	W 91–86				Market Square Arena	49–29
79	April 15, 1996	Charlotte	W 90–87				Market Square Arena	50–29
80	April 17, 1996	@ Detroit	L 93–102				The Palace of Auburn Hills	50–30
81	April 20, 1996	@ Chicago	W 100–99				United Center	51–30
82	April 21, 1996	Cleveland	W 89–88				Market Square Arena	52–30

1995–96 schedule

== Playoffs ==
1996 playoff game log
Eastern Conference First Round: 2–3 (home: 1–2; road: 1–1)

Game	Date	Team	Score	High points	High rebounds	High assists	Location Attendance	Series
1	April 25, 1996	Atlanta	L 80–92	Smits (19)	D. Davis (12)	Pierce (5)	Market Square Arena; 16,438	0–1
2	April 27, 1996	Atlanta	W 102–94 (OT)	Smits (29)	D. Davis (12)	Jackson (9)	Market Square Arena; 16,709	1–1
3	April 29, 1996	@ Atlanta	L 83–90	McKey, Smits (13)	D. Davis (10)	Jackson (6)	Omni Coliseum; 11,290	1–2
4	May 2, 1996	@ Atlanta	W 83–75	Smits (17)	D. Davis, Smits (9)	Jackson (5)	Omni Coliseum; 15,482	2–2
5	May 5, 1996	Atlanta	L 87–89	Miller (29)	D. Davis (13)	Jackson (8)	Market Square Arena; 16,731	2–3

1996 schedule

== Player statistics ==
=== Ragular season ===
Player	POS	GP	GS	MP	REB	AST	STL	BLK	PTS	MPG	RPG	APG	SPG	BPG	PPG
Antonio Davis	PF	82	14	2,092	501	43	33	66	719	25.5	6.1	.5	.4	.8	8.8
Mark Jackson	PG	81	81	2,643	307	635	100	5	806	32.6	3.8	7.8	1.2	.1	10.0
Dale Davis	PF	78	77	2,617	709	76	56	112	803	33.6	9.1	1.0	.7	1.4	10.3
Haywoode Workman	PG	77	4	1,164	124	213	65	4	279	15.1	1.6	2.8	.8	.1	3.6
Reggie Miller	SG	76	76	2,621	214	253	77	13	1,606	34.5	2.8	3.3	1.0	.2	21.1
Ricky Pierce	SG	76	2	1,404	136	101	57	6	737	18.5	1.8	1.3	.8	.1	9.7
Derrick McKey	SF	75	75	2,440	361	262	83	44	879	32.5	4.8	3.5	1.1	.6	11.7
Rik Smits	C	63	63	1,901	433	110	21	45	1,164	30.2	6.9	1.7	.3	.7	18.5
Eddie Johnson	SF	62	1	1,002	153	69	20	4	475	16.2	2.5	1.1	.3	.1	7.7
Travis Best	PG	59	1	571	44	97	20	3	221	9.7	.7	1.6	.3	.1	3.7
Duane Ferrell	SF	54	6	591	93	30	23	3	202	10.9	1.7	.6	.4	.1	3.7
Adrian Caldwell	PF	51	1	327	110	6	9	5	110	6.4	2.2	.1	.2	.1	2.2
Dwayne Schintzius	C	33	8	297	78	14	9	12	111	9.0	2.4	.4	.3	.4	3.4
Fred Hoiberg	SG	15	1	85	9	8	6	1	32	5.7	.6	.5	.4	.1	2.1

=== Playoffs ===
Player	POS	GP	GS	MP	REB	AST	STL	BLK	PTS	MPG	RPG	APG	SPG	BPG	PPG
Mark Jackson	PG	5	5	186	25	30	6	0	53	37.2	5.0	6.0	1.2	.0	10.6
Dale Davis	PF	5	5	184	56	4	3	6	36	36.8	11.2	.8	.6	1.2	7.2
Derrick McKey	SF	5	5	180	33	10	7	1	64	36.0	6.6	2.0	1.4	.2	12.8
Rik Smits	C	5	5	166	37	8	2	2	95	33.2	7.4	1.6	.4	.4	19.0
Ricky Pierce	SG	5	4	133	4	15	8	1	51	26.6	.8	3.0	1.6	.2	10.2
Antonio Davis	PF	5	0	127	31	3	3	6	39	25.4	6.2	.6	.6	1.2	7.8
Travis Best	PG	5	0	84	11	9	6	0	29	16.8	2.2	1.8	1.2	.0	5.8
Duane Ferrell	SF	5	0	69	9	3	4	0	18	13.8	1.8	.6	.8	.0	3.6
Haywoode Workman	PG	5	0	53	3	2	2	0	19	10.6	.6	.4	.4	.0	3.8
Reggie Miller	SG	1	1	31	1	1	1	0	29	31.0	1.0	1.0	1.0	.0	29.0
Eddie Johnson	SF	1	0	9	0	1	0	0	0	9.0	.0	1.0	.0	.0	.0
Adrian Caldwell	PF	1	0	3	1	0	0	0	2	3.0	1.0	.0	.0	.0	2.0

== Awards and records ==
- Reggie Miller, NBA All-Star Game
- Reggie Miller, All-NBA Third Team
- Derrick McKey, NBA All-Defensive Second Team

== Transactions ==
=== Overview ===
Players added

Via draft

- Travis Best
- Fred Hoiberg

Via trade

Via free agency

- Eddie Johnson
- Ricky Pierce
- Dwayne Schintzius
- Adrian Caldwell
Players Lost

Via expansion draft

- Byron Scott

Via trade

Via free agency

- Vern Fleming
- Sam Mitchell
- LaSalle Thompson
- Greg Kite
- Mark Strickland

Additions
Player	Date signed	Former team
Adrian Caldwell	October 4, 1995	Sioux Falls Skyforce (CBA)
Eddie Johnson	October 3, 1995	Olympiacos (Greece)
Ricky Pierce	October 3, 1995	Golden State Warriors
Dwayne Schintzius	October 18, 1995	New Jersey Nets

Subtractions
Player	Reason Left	New team
Vern Fleming	Free Agency	New Jersey Nets
Greg Kite	Free Agency	Rapid City Thrillers (CBA)
Sam Mitchell	Free Agency	Minnesota Timberwolves
Byron Scott	Expansion Draft	Vancouver Grizzlies
Mark Strickland	Free Agency	Unknown
LaSalle Thompson	Free Agency	Philadelphia 76ers

Player transactions citation:

== See also ==
- 1995–96 NBA season
