= 1995–96 Philadelphia 76ers season =

Season of National Basketball Association team the Philadelphia 76ers

- Head coach: John Lucas
- Arena: CoreStates Spectrum

Results
- Record: 18–64 (.220)
- Place: Division: 7th (Atlantic); Conference: 15th (Eastern)
- Playoff finish: Did not qualify
- Stats at Basketball Reference

Local media
- Television: WPSG; SportsChannel Philadelphia; PRISM
- Radio: WIP

The 1995–96 Philadelphia 76ers season was the 47th season for the Philadelphia 76ers in the National Basketball Association, and their 33rd season in Philadelphia, Pennsylvania.

== Season summary ==
=== Off-season ===
The 76ers received the third overall pick in the 1995 NBA draft, and selected shooting guard Jerry Stackhouse from the University of North Carolina. During the off-season, the team signed free agents Vernon Maxwell, Richard Dumas, then later on in December, signed second-year guard Trevor Ruffin, and veteran point guard Scott Skiles, who then retired in January after only just ten games with the team.

=== Regular season ===
With the addition of Stackhouse and Maxwell, the 76ers got off to a 2–2 start to the regular season, but then posted an 11-game losing streak afterwards. Early into the season, the team traded Shawn Bradley, Greg Graham and Tim Perry to the New Jersey Nets in exchange for Derrick Coleman, Rex Walters and Sean Higgins; Coleman only played in just eleven games with the 76ers due to an irregular heartbeat. At mid-season, the team traded second-year forward Sharone Wright to the expansion Toronto Raptors in exchange for Tony Massenburg, and Ed Pinckney, while Jeff Malone was released to free agency, and later on signed as a free agent with the Miami Heat. The 76ers posted a nine-game losing streak in January, posted a seven-game losing streak in February, and held a 9–36 record at the All-Star break. The 76ers posted an eight-game losing streak in March, and had their worst season since the infamous 73-loss 1972–73 season, finishing in last place in the Atlantic Division with an 18–64 record. The team failed to qualify for the NBA playoffs for the fifth consecutive year.

Stackhouse averaged 19.2 points and 3.9 assists per game, and was named to the NBA All-Rookie First Team, while Clarence Weatherspoon averaged 16.7 points, 9.7 rebounds and 1.4 steals and blocks per game each, and Maxwell provided the team with 16.2 points, 4.4 assists and 1.3 steals per game, and also led them with 146 three-point field goals. In addition, Ruffin contributed 12.8 points and 4.4 assists per game, along with 104 three-point field goals, while Coleman provided with 11.2 points and 6.5 rebounds per game, and Massenburg averaged 9.9 points and 6.2 rebounds per game in 30 games after the trade. Meanwhile, Higgins contributed 8.0 points per game, second-year center Derrick Alston averaged 6.2 points and 4.1 rebounds per game, Dumas provided with 6.2 points per game, but only played just 39 games, Pinckney provided with 5.6 points and 6.5 rebounds per game in 27 games, and Walters contributed 4.6 points per game in 33 games.

During the NBA All-Star weekend at the Alamodome in San Antonio, Texas, Stackhouse was selected for the NBA Rookie Game, as a member of the Eastern Conference Rookie team, and also participated in the NBA Slam Dunk Contest. Stackhouse finished tied in fourth place in Rookie of the Year voting. The 76ers finished 28th in the NBA in home-game attendance, with an attendance of 476,016 at the CoreStates Spectrum during the regular season, which was the second-lowest in the league.

=== Aftermath ===
This was also the team's final season in which they played their home games at the CoreStates Spectrum. Following the season, Maxwell re-signed with his former team, the San Antonio Spurs, while Massenburg signed with the New Jersey Nets, head coach John Lucas II was fired, and Ruffin, Pinckney, Dumas, Higgins and Alston were all released to free agency. In Dumas' case, he would be permanently banned from the NBA due to him violating a clause that forbade him from drinking alcohol, which was his third strike in terms of drug violations in the NBA.

== Offseason ==
=== Draft picks ===
Round	Pick	Player	Position	Nationality	School/Club team
1	3	Jerry Stackhouse	SG	United States	North Carolina

== Roster ==
1995–96 Philadelphia 76ers roster
Players

Pos.	No.	Player	Height	Weight	DOB	From
C	21	Derrick Alston	6 ft 11 in (2.11 m)	225 lb (102 kg)	––	Duquesne
F	44	Derrick Coleman (injured)	6 ft 10 in (2.08 m)	230 lb (104 kg)	––	Syracuse
F	7	Richard Dumas	6 ft 7 in (2.01 m)	200 lb (91 kg)	––	Oklahoma State
F	9	Sean Higgins	6 ft 9 in (2.06 m)	205 lb (93 kg)	––	Michigan
F	30	Tony Massenburg	6 ft 9 in (2.06 m)	220 lb (100 kg)	––	Maryland
G	11	Vernon Maxwell	6 ft 4 in (1.93 m)	180 lb (82 kg)	––	Florida
F	54	Ed Pinckney	6 ft 9 in (2.06 m)	195 lb (88 kg)	––	Villanova
G	8	Trevor Ruffin	6 ft 1 in (1.85 m)	185 lb (84 kg)	––	Hawaiʻi
G	5	Scott Skiles	6 ft 1 in (1.85 m)	180 lb (82 kg)	––	Michigan State
G	42	Jerry Stackhouse	6 ft 6 in (1.98 m)	218 lb (99 kg)	––	North Carolina
G	20	Greg Sutton	6 ft 2 in (1.88 m)	170 lb (77 kg)	––	Oral Roberts
C	41	LaSalle Thompson	6 ft 10 in (2.08 m)	245 lb (111 kg)	––	Texas
G	23	Rex Walters	6 ft 4 in (1.93 m)	190 lb (86 kg)	––	Kansas
F	35	Clarence Weatherspoon	6 ft 6 in (1.98 m)	240 lb (109 kg)	––	Southern Miss
C	55	Scott Williams (injured)	6 ft 10 in (2.08 m)	230 lb (104 kg)	––	North Carolina

Coaches
Head coach
- John Lucas II
Assistant(s)
- Ron Adams
- Maurice Cheeks
- Tom Thibodeau

Legend
- (DP) Unsigned draft pick
- (FA) Free agent
- (S) Suspended
- Injured

Roster

=== Roster notes ===
- Point guard Scott Skiles retired on January 6, 1996.

== Regular season ==
=== Season standings ===
Atlantic Division	W	L	PCT	GB	Home	Road	Div	GP
y–Orlando Magic	60	22	.732	12.0	37‍–‍4	23‍–‍18	21–3	82
x–New York Knicks	47	35	.573	25.0	26‍–‍15	21‍–‍20	16–8	82
x–Miami Heat	42	40	.512	30.0	26‍–‍15	16‍–‍25	13–12	82
Washington Bullets	39	43	.476	33.0	25‍–‍16	14‍–‍27	10–14	82
Boston Celtics	33	49	.402	39.0	18‍–‍23	15‍–‍26	12–12	82
New Jersey Nets	30	52	.366	42.0	20‍–‍21	10‍–‍31	8–17	82
Philadelphia 76ers	18	64	.220	54.0	11‍–‍30	7‍–‍34	5–19	82

Eastern Conference
#	Team	W	L	PCT	GB	GP
1	z–Chicago Bulls	72	10	.878	–	82
2	y–Orlando Magic	60	22	.732	12.0	82
3	x–Indiana Pacers	52	30	.634	20.0	82
4	x–Cleveland Cavaliers	47	35	.573	25.0	82
5	x–New York Knicks	47	35	.573	25.0	82
6	x–Atlanta Hawks	46	36	.561	26.0	82
7	x–Detroit Pistons	46	36	.561	26.0	82
8	x–Miami Heat	42	40	.512	30.0	82
9	Charlotte Hornets	41	41	.500	31.0	82
10	Washington Bullets	39	43	.476	33.0	82
11	Boston Celtics	33	49	.402	39.0	82
12	New Jersey Nets	30	52	.366	42.0	82
13	Milwaukee Bucks	25	57	.305	47.0	82
14	Toronto Raptors	21	61	.256	51.0	82
15	Philadelphia 76ers	18	64	.220	54.0	82

z - clinched division title
y - clinched division title
x - clinched playoff spot

== Awards and records ==
- Jerry Stackhouse, NBA All-Rookie Team 1st Team

== Player statistics ==
Legend
GP	Games played	GS	Games started	MPG	Minutes per game
FG%	Field-goal percentage	3P%	3-point field-goal percentage	FT%	Free-throw percentage
RPG	Rebounds per game	APG	Assists per game	SPG	Steals per game
BPG	Blocks per game	PPG	Points per game

=== Regular season ===
Player	GP	GS	MPG	FG%	3P%	FT%	RPG	APG	SPG	BPG	PPG
Derrick Alston	73	41	22.1	.512	.333	.491	4.1	.8	.8	.7	6.2
Elmer Bennett	8	0	8.3	.235		.750	.6	1.0	.1	.1	1.4
Shawn Bradley^{†}	12	11	27.8	.443		.760	8.8	.7	.7	3.2	8.8
Mike Brown	9	1	18.0	.563		.471	4.1	.3	.3	.2	2.9
Derrick Coleman	11	11	26.7	.407	.333	.625	6.5	2.8	.4	.9	11.2
Richard Dumas	39	14	18.9	.468	.222	.700	2.5	1.1	1.1	.2	6.2
Greg Graham^{†}	8	3	16.0	.531	.500	.882	1.9	1.4	.6	.0	7.0
Greg Grant^{†}	11	2	25.5	.375	.222	.833	1.9	5.5	1.1	.2	4.1
Sean Higgins	44	4	20.8	.415	.372	.946	2.1	1.3	.5	.3	8.0
Jeff Malone^{†}	25	3	16.3	.394	.313	.923	1.3	.8	.5	.0	6.2
Tony Massenburg^{†}	30	8	26.8	.483	.000	.739	6.2	.4	.5	.4	9.9
Vernon Maxwell	75	57	32.9	.390	.317	.756	3.1	4.4	1.3	.2	16.2
Tim Perry^{†}	8	0	10.9	.444	1.000	.667	1.6	.3	.3	.4	2.4
Ed Pinckney^{†}	27	23	25.1	.529		.764	6.5	.8	1.2	.4	5.6
Trevor Ruffin	61	23	25.4	.406	.366	.813	2.2	4.4	.7	.0	12.8
Scott Skiles	10	9	23.6	.351	.441	.800	1.6	3.8	.7	.0	6.3
Jerry Stackhouse	72	71	37.5	.414	.318	.747	3.7	3.9	1.1	1.1	19.2
Greg Sutton^{†}	30	2	15.5	.389	.417	.741	1.2	2.1	.6	.1	6.3
LaSalle Thompson	44	11	17.6	.398		.792	4.5	.6	.4	.5	1.9
Rex Walters^{†}	33	8	15.8	.426	.352	.783	1.5	2.9	.7	.1	4.6
Clarence Weatherspoon	78	75	39.7	.484	.000	.746	9.7	2.0	1.4	1.4	16.7
Scott Williams	13	1	14.8	.517	.000	.833	3.5	.4	.5	.5	3.1
Trevor Wilson	6	0	13.2	.500		.750	2.3	.7	.5	.0	3.8
Sharone Wright^{†}	46	32	24.7	.477		.629	6.5	.6	.5	.8	10.5

- ^{†} Denotes player spent time with another team in the season. Stats reflect time with the 76ers only.

Player statistics citation:

== See also ==
- 1995-96 NBA season
