= 1995–96 Milwaukee Bucks season =

NBA professional basketball team season

- Head coach: Mike Dunleavy
- General manager: Mike Dunleavy
- Owner: Herb Kohl
- Arena: Bradley Center

Results
- Record: 25–57 (.305)
- Place: Division: 7th (Central); Conference: 13th (Eastern)
- Playoff finish: Did not qualify
- Stats at Basketball Reference

Local media
- Television: WVTV; Wisconsin Sports Network (Jim Paschke, Jon McGlocklin)
- Radio: WTMJ

The 1995–96 Milwaukee Bucks season was the 28th season for the Milwaukee Bucks in the National Basketball Association.

== Season summary ==
=== Off-season ===
The Bucks received the eleventh overall pick in the 1995 NBA draft, and selected power forward Gary Trent out of Ohio University, but soon traded him to the Portland Trail Blazers in exchange for rookie shooting guard, and first-round draft pick Shawn Respert out of Michigan State University. During the off-season, the team re-signed free agent and former Bucks All-Star forward Terry Cummings, and acquired former All-Star center Kevin Duckworth from the Washington Bullets. Early into the regular season, they traded Todd Day and Alton Lister to the Boston Celtics in exchange for Sherman Douglas, and dealt Eric Murdock and second-year forward Eric Mobley to the expansion Vancouver Grizzlies in exchange for Benoit Benjamin.

For the season, the Bucks revealed new dark green alternate road uniforms, which featured a buck in purple and silver colors on the front of their jerseys, a black, silver and purple trim, and dark green-to-purple fade gradient side panels with a silver outline on the bottom of their shorts; the shorts also featured the team's primary logo on the left leg, and the jersey number on the right leg. The team's new alternate uniforms would remain in use until 1999.

=== Regular season ===
With the addition of Cummings, along with developing superstars Vin Baker and second-year forward Glenn Robinson, the Bucks were considered a team with playoff potential. However, the team continued to underachieve holding an 18–27 record at the All-Star break. After holding a 21–35 record as of March 2, 1996, and with Duckworth only playing just eight games due to a knee injury sustained during the preseason, the team suffered a dreadful 15-game losing streak from March to April, the longest in franchise history to date. The Bucks finished in seventh place in the Central Division with a disappointing 25–57 record, and missed the NBA playoffs for the fifth consecutive year.

Baker averaged 21.1 points and 9.9 rebounds per game, while Robinson averaged 20.2 points, 6.1 rebounds and 3.6 assists per game, and Douglas provided the team with 11.5 points and 5.8 assists per game in 69 games after the trade. In addition, Johnny Newman contributed 10.8 points per game, while Cummings provided with 8.0 points and 5.5 rebounds per game, and Benjamin averaged 7.8 points and 6.2 rebounds per game. Meanwhile, Marty Conlon averaged 5.3 points and 2.4 rebounds per game, Lee Mayberry provided with 5.1 points and 3.7 assists per game, and Respert contributed 4.9 points per game.

During the NBA All-Star weekend at the Alamodome in San Antonio, Texas, Baker was selected for the 1996 NBA All-Star Game, as a member of the Eastern Conference All-Star team. The Bucks finished 22nd in the NBA in home-game attendance, with an attendance of 647,088 at the Bradley Center during the regular season.

=== Aftermath ===
Following the season, head coach Mike Dunleavy was fired after coaching the Bucks for four seasons. Meanwhile, Cummings signed as a free agent with the Seattle SuperSonics midway through the following season, Duckworth signed with the Los Angeles Clippers, Mayberry signed with the Vancouver Grizzlies, Conlon signed with the Boston Celtics, and Benjamin signed with the Toronto Raptors.

== Draft picks ==
| Round | Pick | Player | Position | Nationality | College |
|---|---|---|---|---|---|
| 1 | 11 | Gary Trent | PF | United States | Ohio |
| 2 | 38 | Rashard Griffith | C | United States | Wisconsin |
| 2 | 43 | Eric Snow | PG | United States | Michigan State |

== Roster ==
1995–96 Milwaukee Bucks roster
Players

| Pos. | No. | Player | Height | Weight | DOB | From |
|---|---|---|---|---|---|---|
| F | 42 | Vin Baker | 6 ft 11 in (2.11 m) | 232 lb (105 kg) | 1971–11–23 | Hartford |
| C | 7 | Benoit Benjamin | 7 ft 0 in (2.13 m) | 250 lb (113 kg) | 1964–11–22 | Creighton |
| C | 30 | Marty Conlon | 6 ft 10 in (2.08 m) | 224 lb (102 kg) | 1968–01–19 | Providence |
| F | 34 | Terry Cummings | 6 ft 9 in (2.06 m) | 220 lb (100 kg) | 1961–03–15 | DePaul |
| G | 20 | Sherman Douglas | 6 ft 0 in (1.83 m) | 180 lb (82 kg) | 1966–09–15 | Syracuse |
| C | 00 | Kevin Duckworth (injured) | 7 ft 0 in (2.13 m) | 275 lb (125 kg) | 1964–04–01 | Eastern Illinois |
| F | 31 | Randolph Keys | 6 ft 7 in (2.01 m) | 195 lb (88 kg) | 1966–04–19 | Southern Miss |
| G | 11 | Lee Mayberry | 6 ft 1 in (1.85 m) | 172 lb (78 kg) | 1970–06–12 | Arkansas |
| G | 22 | Johnny Newman | 6 ft 7 in (2.01 m) | 190 lb (86 kg) | 1963–11–28 | Richmond |
| C | 54 | Mike Peplowski | 6 ft 10 in (2.08 m) | 270 lb (122 kg) | 1970–10–15 | Michigan State |
| G | 3 | Shawn Respert | 6 ft 3 in (1.91 m) | 195 lb (88 kg) | 1972–02–06 | Michigan State |
| F | 44 | Jerry Reynolds | 6 ft 8 in (2.03 m) | 200 lb (91 kg) | 1962–12–23 | LSU |
| F | 13 | Glenn Robinson | 6 ft 7 in (2.01 m) | 240 lb (109 kg) | 1973–01–10 | Purdue |

Coaches
Head coach
- Mike Dunleavy, Sr.
Assistant(s)
- Butch Carter
- Jim Eyen
- Frank Hamblen

Legend
- (DP) Unsigned draft pick
- (FA) Free agent
- (S) Suspended
- Injured

Roster

== Regular season ==
=== Season standings ===
| Central Division | W | L | PCT | GB | Home | Road | Div | GP |
|---|---|---|---|---|---|---|---|---|
| z–Chicago Bulls | 72 | 10 | .878 | – | 39‍–‍2 | 33‍–‍8 | 24–4 | 82 |
| x–Indiana Pacers | 52 | 30 | .634 | 20.0 | 32‍–‍9 | 20‍–‍21 | 19–9 | 82 |
| x–Cleveland Cavaliers | 47 | 35 | .573 | 25.0 | 26‍–‍15 | 21‍–‍20 | 13–15 | 82 |
| x–Atlanta Hawks | 46 | 36 | .561 | 26.0 | 26‍–‍15 | 20‍–‍21 | 15–13 | 82 |
| x–Detroit Pistons | 46 | 36 | .561 | 26.0 | 30‍–‍11 | 16‍–‍25 | 15–13 | 82 |
| Charlotte Hornets | 41 | 41 | .500 | 31.0 | 25‍–‍16 | 16‍–‍25 | 13–15 | 82 |
| Milwaukee Bucks | 25 | 57 | .305 | 47.0 | 14‍–‍27 | 11‍–‍30 | 8–20 | 82 |
| Toronto Raptors | 21 | 61 | .256 | 51.0 | 15‍–‍26 | 6‍–‍35 | 5–23 | 82 |

Eastern Conference
| # | Team | W | L | PCT | GB | GP |
|---|---|---|---|---|---|---|
| 1 | z–Chicago Bulls | 72 | 10 | .878 | – | 82 |
| 2 | y–Orlando Magic | 60 | 22 | .732 | 12.0 | 82 |
| 3 | x–Indiana Pacers | 52 | 30 | .634 | 20.0 | 82 |
| 4 | x–Cleveland Cavaliers | 47 | 35 | .573 | 25.0 | 82 |
| 5 | x–New York Knicks | 47 | 35 | .573 | 25.0 | 82 |
| 6 | x–Atlanta Hawks | 46 | 36 | .561 | 26.0 | 82 |
| 7 | x–Detroit Pistons | 46 | 36 | .561 | 26.0 | 82 |
| 8 | x–Miami Heat | 42 | 40 | .512 | 30.0 | 82 |
| 9 | Charlotte Hornets | 41 | 41 | .500 | 31.0 | 82 |
| 10 | Washington Bullets | 39 | 43 | .476 | 33.0 | 82 |
| 11 | Boston Celtics | 33 | 49 | .402 | 39.0 | 82 |
| 12 | New Jersey Nets | 30 | 52 | .366 | 42.0 | 82 |
| 13 | Milwaukee Bucks | 25 | 57 | .305 | 47.0 | 82 |
| 14 | Toronto Raptors | 21 | 61 | .256 | 51.0 | 82 |
| 15 | Philadelphia 76ers | 18 | 64 | .220 | 54.0 | 82 |

z - clinched division title
y - clinched division title
x - clinched playoff spot

=== Game log ===
1995–96 game log
Total: 25–57 (Home: 14–27; Road: 11–30)
November: 3–3 (home: 2–1; road: 1–2)

| Game | Date | Team | Score | High points | High rebounds | High assists | Location Attendance | Record |
|---|---|---|---|---|---|---|---|---|
| 1 | November 3, 1995 | @ Boston | W 101–100 | | | | FleetCenter; 16,321 | 1–0 |
| 2 | November 4, 1995 | New York | L 71–84 | | | | Bradley Center; 18,633 | 1–1 |
| 3 | November 7, 1995 | @ Houston | L 89–106 | Vin Baker (21) | | | The Summit; 15,095 | 1–2 |
| 4 | November 9, 1995 | @ Dallas | L 94–104 | | | | Reunion Arena; 15,095 | 1–3 |
| 6 | November 14, 1995 | San Antonio | W 98–84 | | | | Bradley Center; 13,464 | 2–4 |
| 9 | November 22, 1995 | Toronto | W 96–86 | | | | Bradley Center; 14,959 | 3–6 |

December: 1–2 (home: 1–1; road: 0–1)

| Game | Date | Team | Score | High points | High rebounds | High assists | Location Attendance | Record |
|---|---|---|---|---|---|---|---|---|
| 14 | December 1, 1995 | @ Seattle | L 99–110 | | | | KeyArena; 17,072 | 4–10 |
| 17 | December 9, 1995 | Chicago | L 106–118 | | | | Bradley Center; 18,633 | 6–11 |
| 24 | December 23, 1995 | Atlanta | W 96–86 | | | | Bradley Center; 15,658 | 9–15 |

January: 0–0 (home: 0–0; road: 0–0)

| Game | Date | Team | Score | High points | High rebounds | High assists | Location Attendance | Record |

February: 2–1 (home: 2–1; road: 0–0)

| Game | Date | Team | Score | High points | High rebounds | High assists | Location Attendance | Record |
|---|---|---|---|---|---|---|---|---|
| 42 | February 1, 1996 | Denver | W 108–102 | | | | Bradley Center; 13,389 | 16–26 |
| 43 | February 3, 1996 | Cleveland | L 88–111 | | | | Bradley Center; 17,979 | 16–27 |
| 44 | February 6, 1996 | Dallas | W 114–111 | | | | Bradley Center; 13,854 | 17–27 |

March: 0–0 (home: 0–0; road: 0–0)

| Game | Date | Team | Score | High points | High rebounds | High assists | Location Attendance | Record |

April: 0–1 (home: 0–1; road: 0–0)

| Game | Date | Team | Score | High points | High rebounds | High assists | Location Attendance | Record |
|---|---|---|---|---|---|---|---|---|
| 79 | April 16, 1996 | Chicago | L 80–86 | | | | Bradley Center; 18,633 | 24–55 |

1995–96 schedule

== Player statistics ==
Legend
| GP | Games played | GS | Games started | MPG | Minutes per game |
| FG% | Field-goal percentage | 3P% | 3-point field-goal percentage | FT% | Free-throw percentage |
| RPG | Rebounds per game | APG | Assists per game | SPG | Steals per game |
| BPG | Blocks per game | PPG | Points per game |

| Player | GP | GS | MPG | FG% | 3FG% | FT% | RPG | APG | SPG | BPG | PPG |
|---|---|---|---|---|---|---|---|---|---|---|---|
| Vin Baker | 82 | 82 | 40.5 | 48.9 | 20.8 | 67.0 | 9.9 | 2.6 | 0.8 | 1.1 | 21.1 |
| Glenn Robinson | 82 | 82 | 39.6 | 45.4 | 34.2 | 81.2 | 6.1 | 3.6 | 1.2 | 0.5 | 20.2 |
| Sherman Douglas | 69 | 62 | 30.4 | 51.4 | 37.9 | 75.4 | 2.3 | 5.8 | 0.9 | 0.1 | 11.5 |
| Johnny Newman | 82 | 82 | 32.8 | 49.5 | 37.7 | 80.2 | 2.4 | 1.9 | 1.1 | 0.2 | 10.8 |
| Todd Day | 8 | 0 | 21.4 | 31.0 | 20.0 | 92.3 | 2.8 | 0.6 | 0.5 | 0.4 | 9.1 |
| Terry Cummings | 81 | 13 | 21.9 | 46.2 | 14.3 | 65.0 | 5.5 | 1.1 | 0.7 | 0.4 | 8.0 |
| Benoit Benjamin | 70 | 58 | 21.3 | 52.0 | 0.0 | 73.2 | 6.2 | 0.7 | 0.5 | 1.0 | 7.8 |
| Eric Murdock | 9 | 0 | 21.4 | 36.4 | 26.1 | 66.7 | 1.6 | 3.9 | 0.7 | 0.0 | 6.9 |
| Marty Conlon | 74 | 1 | 12.9 | 46.8 | 16.7 | 76.4 | 2.4 | 0.9 | 0.3 | 0.1 | 5.3 |
| Lee Mayberry | 82 | 20 | 20.8 | 42.0 | 39.7 | 60.3 | 1.1 | 3.7 | 0.8 | 0.1 | 5.1 |
| Shawn Respert | 62 | 0 | 13.6 | 38.7 | 34.4 | 83.3 | 1.2 | 1.1 | 0.5 | 0.1 | 4.9 |
| Randolph Keys | 69 | 1 | 11.8 | 41.8 | 31.0 | 83.7 | 1.8 | 0.9 | 0.5 | 0.2 | 3.4 |
| Jerry Reynolds | 19 | 0 | 10.1 | 39.6 | 10.0 | 61.9 | 1.7 | 0.6 | 0.8 | 0.3 | 2.9 |
| Alton Lister | 7 | 5 | 12.6 | 44.4 | 0.0 | 100.0 | 4.1 | 0.6 | 0.0 | 0.4 | 1.4 |
| Mike Peplowski | 5 | 0 | 2.4 | 60.0 | 0.0 | 33.3 | 0.8 | 0.2 | 0.2 | 0.4 | 1.4 |
| Eric Mobley | 5 | 3 | 13.0 | 28.6 | 0.0 | 50.0 | 2.4 | 0.0 | 0.2 | 0.2 | 1.2 |
| Kevin Duckworth | 8 | 1 | 7.3 | 21.4 | 0.0 | 50.0 | 0.9 | 0.3 | 0.3 | 0.0 | 1.1 |

Player statistics citation:

== Transactions ==
=== Overview ===
Players Added

Via draft

- Shawn Respert

Via trade

- Benoit Benjamin
- Sherman Douglas
- Kevin Duckworth

Via free agency

- Terry Cummings
- Randolph Keys
- Mike Peplowski
Players Lost

Via trade

- Todd Day
- Alton Lister
- Eric Mobley
- Eric Murdock

Via free agency

- Jon Barry

Expansion Draft

- Ed Pinckney

=== Trades ===
June 28, 1995
To Milwaukee Bucks----
- Shawn Respert
To Portland Trail Blazers----
- Gary Trent
June 28, 1995
To Milwaukee Bucks----
- Aurelijius Zukauskas
To Seattle SuperSonics----
- Eric Snow
October 18, 1995
To Milwaukee Bucks----
- Kevin Duckworth
To Washington Bullets----
- Bob McCann
November 26, 1995
To Milwaukee Bucks----
- Sherman Douglas
To Boston Celtics----
- Todd Day
- Alton Lister
November 27, 1995
To Milwaukee Bucks----
- Benoit Benjamin
To Vancouver Grizzlies----
- Eric Mobley
- Eric Murdock

=== Free agents ===
| Player | Signed | Former team |
| Randolph Keys | October 6, 1995 | Quad City Thunder |
| Terry Cummings | November 2, 1995 | San Antonio Spurs |

Subtractions
| Player | Date signed | New team |
|---|---|---|
| Ed Pinckney | Expansion Draft June 24, 1995 | Toronto Raptors |

Player transactions citation:

== See also ==
- 1995-96 NBA season
