= Larry Sykes =

American basketball player

Personal information
- Born: April 11, 1973 (age 53) Toledo, Ohio, U.S.
- Listed height: 6 ft 9 in (2.06 m)
- Listed weight: 255 lb (116 kg)

Career information
- High school: St. Francis de Sales (Toledo, Ohio)
- College: Xavier (1991–1995)
- NBA draft: 1995: undrafted
- Position: Power forward
- Number: 54

Career history
- 1995–1997: Rockford Lightning
- 1995: Boston Celtics
- 1998–1999: Fort Wayne Fury
- Stats at NBA.com
- Stats at Basketball Reference

Larry Sykes (born April 11, 1973) is an American former professional basketball player born in Toledo, Ohio. He played briefly in the National Basketball Association (NBA) after a college career for the Xavier Musketeers.

A 6'9" power forward from Xavier University, Sykes appeared in one game for the Boston Celtics during the 1995-96 NBA season. He tallied two rebounds and one turnover in two minutes of action. Sykes also played for the Rockford Lightning and Fort Wayne Fury of the Continental Basketball Association.

Sykes later became an assistant coach at Lakota East High School in Cincinnati, Ohio, for the girls varsity basketball team.

In 2013 he was elected Toledo City Council, however he was defeated in 2021 after pleading guilty to bribery charges.

== Personal life ==
Sykes' uncle, Fred Foster, played eight years in the NBA with five teams from 1969 to 1977.
