= Greg Sutton (basketball) =

American basketball player (born 1967)

Personal information
- Born: December 3, 1967 (age 58) Santa Cruz, California, U.S.
- Listed height: 6 ft 2 in (1.88 m)
- Listed weight: 170 lb (77 kg)

Career information
- High school: Frederick A. Douglass (Oklahoma City, Oklahoma)
- College: Langston (1986–1987); Oral Roberts (1988–1991)
- NBA draft: 1991: 2nd round, 49th overall pick
- Drafted by: San Antonio Spurs
- Playing career: 1991–2002
- Position: Point guard
- Number: 23, 12, 20

Career history
- 1991: Empire State Stallions
- 1991–1992: San Antonio Spurs
- 1992: Fort Wayne Fury
- 1992–1993: Fargo-Moorhead Fever
- 1993–1994: Apollon Patras
- 1994–1996: Charlotte Hornets
- 1996: Philadelphia 76ers
- 1996: Scavolini Pesaro
- 1996–1997: Piraikos Syndesmos
- 1997–1998: Quad City Thunder
- 1998: Idaho Stampede
- 1998: Valvi Girona
- 1998–1999: Hapoel Holon
- 1999–2000: Bnei HaSharon
- 2001: BingoSNAI Montecatini
- 2001–2002: Proteas EKA AEL

Career highlights
- CBA steals leader (1993)

Career NBA statistics
- Points: 761 (4.5 ppg)
- Assists: 284 (1.7 apg)
- Stats at NBA.com
- Stats at Basketball Reference

Gregory Ray Sutton (born December 3, 1967) is an American former professional basketball player who was selected by the San Antonio Spurs in the second round (49th pick overall) of the 1991 NBA draft. Sutton, a 6-foot-2-inch (1.88 m), 170-pound (77 kg) point guard, played for Spurs, Charlotte Hornets and Philadelphia 76ers in three seasons. In his NBA career, Sutton played in a total of 168 games and averaged 4.5 ppg. He played collegiately at Langston University and Oral Roberts University.
