= Todd Mundt =

American basketball player (born 1970)

Personal information
- Born: May 17, 1970 (age 56) Iowa City, Iowa, U.S.
- Listed height: 7 ft 0 in (2.13 m)
- Listed weight: 250 lb (113 kg)

Career information
- High school: Central Merry (Jackson, Tennessee)
- College: Memphis (1989–1992); Delta State (1992–1993)
- NBA draft: 1993: undrafted
- Playing career: 1993–2000
- Position: Center
- Number: 51

Career history
- 1993–1994: Rockford Lightning
- 1995–1996: Atlanta Hawks
- 1996: Boston Celtics
- 1996–1997: Rockford Lightning
- 1998–1999: Newcastle Falcons
- 1999–2000: Wollongong Hawks
- Stats at NBA.com
- Stats at Basketball Reference

Todd Michael Mundt (born May 17, 1970) is an American former professional National Basketball Association (NBA) player. He played college basketball at Delta State University and University of Memphis. He was a 7'0" center.

In 1995-96, Mundt played for the Boston Celtics and Atlanta Hawks.

Mundt played in the Australian National Basketball League (NBL) for the Newcastle Falcons and Wollongong Hawks from 1998 to 2000.

He is currently a territory manager at Atrium Medical, a Knoxville, Tennessee-area company that sells medical devices.
