= Chris Mills (basketball) =

American basketball player (born 1970)

Personal information
- Born: January 25, 1970 (age 56) Los Angeles, California, U.S.
- Listed height: 6 ft 7 in (2.01 m)
- Listed weight: 220 lb (100 kg)

Career information
- High school: Fairfax (Los Angeles, California)
- College: Kentucky (1988–1989); Arizona (1989–1993)
- NBA draft: 1993: 1st round, 22nd overall pick
- Drafted by: Cleveland Cavaliers
- Playing career: 1993–2003
- Position: Small forward
- Number: 24, 42, 34

Career history
- 1993–1997: Cleveland Cavaliers
- 1997–1998: New York Knicks
- 1999–2003: Golden State Warriors

Career highlights
- Third-team All-American – AP, NABC, UPI (1993); Pac-10 Player of the Year (1993); 2× First-team All-Pac-10 (1992, 1993); McDonald's All-American (1988); First-team Parade All-American (1988); Second-team Parade All-American (1987); California Mr. Basketball (1988)

Career NBA statistics
- Points: 6,357 (11.2 ppg)
- Rebounds: 2,808 (4.9 rpg)
- Assists: 1,063 (1.9 apg)
- Stats at NBA.com
- Stats at Basketball Reference

Christopher Lemonte Mills (born January 25, 1970) is an American former professional basketball player who played ten seasons in the National Basketball Association (NBA).

== High school ==
Chris Mills attended Fairfax High School in Los Angeles, from 1986 to 1988. At 6 ft 7 in, he was the starting center for each of his three years playing varsity basketball there. In 1987 and 1988, he was awarded the City 4-A Player of the Year Award, as well as Mr. Basketball for the state of California. He was a 1988 McDonald's All-American in basketball.

El Camino Real High School basketball coach, Mike McNulty said of Chris Mills, "He's one of the three best players ever to come out of Los Angeles—he's gotta be right there with John Williams and Marques Johnson." Taft High School basketball coach, Jim Woodard, echoed these sentiments when he said, "I've been watching city basketball for 33 years. Mills is the best I've ever seen. He can do it all."

== College ==
Mills graduated from University of Arizona, having been kicked off the team at the University of Kentucky by the NCAA after the 1988–89 season. He was the center of a scandal involving receiving improper payments, allegedly from a UK booster. The scandal broke when a package addressed to Mills' father, Claud Mills, popped open while being sorted at Emery Worldwide, whose employees later testified that it contained a video cassette and fifty $20 bills. Claud Mills claims the package did not contain any cash when it was delivered.

== Professional career ==
He was selected by the Cleveland Cavaliers as the 22nd overall pick in the 1993 NBA draft, for whom he played four seasons (1993-94 through 1997–98). Mills then played for the New York Knicks for the 1997–98 season. He played the next five seasons (1998-99 through 2002–03) for the Golden State Warriors. He was a solid defender on the wing and a decent shooter. Mills also had several problems with his health in his late career and was not a stellar athlete, ultimately being a solid back-up off the bench.

In 1999, in a game against the Dallas Mavericks, after a jump ball, Mills attempted to make a basket, but on the wrong side of the court. Amazingly, his shot was blocked by opposing player Samaki Walker.

== Outside basketball ==
Mills recorded a rap single entitled "Sumptin' to Groove To," along with several NBA players such as Jason Kidd, Cedric Ceballos and J.R. Rider on the album B-Ball's Best Kept Secret released in 1994. He is also a member of Alpha Phi Alpha fraternity.

He also had a role in the 1994 movie Blue Chips along with several other professional athletes and coaches, as well as a role in the 1998 movie Da Game of Life, as a basketball player named Scooter.
