= 1996 NBA All-Star Game =

Exhibition basketball game

	1	2	3	4	Total
East	33	28	41	27	129
West	32	26	22	38	118
- Date: February 11, 1996
- Arena: Alamodome
- City: San Antonio
- MVP: Michael Jordan
- National anthem: Emilio (American); Shania Twain (Canadian)
- Attendance: 36,037
- Network: NBC; TNT (All-Star Saturday)
- Announcers: Marv Albert, Matt Guokas and Steve Jones
West	East

NBA All-Star Game
< 1995	1997 >

The 1996 NBA All-Star Game was the 46th edition of the NBA All-Star Game, an exhibition basketball game played on February 11, 1996. The event was held at the Alamodome in San Antonio, home of the Spurs, and was a part of the 50th season of the NBA. The game was televised nationally by NBC in the United States and by CTV in Canada. There were 36,037 people in attendance. The East beat the West 129–118. Michael Jordan put on a show for the fans in his first game back from retirement and ended up receiving the game's Most Valuable Player award.

== Ballots ==
The rosters for the All-Star game were chosen via a fan ballot. The fans would vote for every position, as well as the coaches, and the players that received the most votes would be placed on a team. If a player were unable to participate due to an injury, then the commissioner would select another player as a replacement. Grant Hill led the all-star voting with 1,358,004 votes with Michael Jordan being right behind him with 1,341,422 votes. The rest of the Eastern conference starters were Penny Hardaway, Scottie Pippen and Shaquille O'Neal. The reserves included Patrick Ewing, Reggie Miller, Vin Baker and Terrell Brandon. For the West, the person that led the all-star voting was Charles Barkley with 1,268,195 votes. Clyde Drexler, after seven appearances with Portland Trail Blazers, appeared in the game for the first time as a Houston Rocket. The rest of the Western starters were Jason Kidd, Shawn Kemp, and Hakeem Olajuwon. The reserves included David Robinson, Gary Payton, Sean Elliott, and Karl Malone.

== Coaches ==
Phil Jackson, head coach of the Eastern Conference leader Chicago Bulls, coached the Eastern All-Stars. George Karl, head coach of the Western Conference leader Seattle SuperSonics, coached the Western All-Stars.

== All-Star Game ==
=== Box Score ===
NBC

February 11, 1996
6:30pm

Western Conference 118, Eastern Conference 129
Scoring by quarter: 32–33, 26–28, 22–41, 38–27
Pts: Gary Payton, David Robinson 18 each Rebs: David Robinson 11; Asts: Jason Kidd 10	Pts: Shaquille O'Neal 25; Rebs: Shaquille O'Neal 10; Asts: Penny Hardaway 7

Alamodome, San Antonio, Texas
Attendance: 36,037

This was the first All-Star game that Michael Jordan played in after returning from his first retirement. He managed to log 20 points, 4 rebounds, 1 assist, 1 steal, was 8–11 from the field, and didn't commit any turnovers. Shaquille O'Neal scored 25 points and had 10 rebounds, leading the East in both categories. For the West, Jason Kidd lead the team with 10 assists in his first All-Star Game appearance. The scoring leaders for the West were David Robinson and Gary Payton, both contributing 18 points. The East won the game by a score of 129–118. There was audible dissatisfaction among the crowd when it was revealed that Jordan would be the game's MVP. Some of them felt that O'Neal deserved the award. However, Jordan played six fewer minutes and had a higher efficiency rating.

== Roster ==
Eastern Conference All-Stars
Pos	Player	Team	No. of selections	Votes
Starters
G	Penny Hardaway	Orlando Magic	2nd	1,050,461
G	Michael Jordan	Chicago Bulls	10th	1,341,422
F	Scottie Pippen	Chicago Bulls	6th	1,289,649
F	Grant Hill	Detroit Pistons	2nd	1,358,004
C	Shaquille O'Neal	Orlando Magic	4th	1,290,591
Reserves
F	Vin Baker	Milwaukee Bucks	2nd	259,279
G	Terrell Brandon	Cleveland Cavaliers	1st	—
C	Patrick Ewing	New York Knicks	10th	437,003
F	Juwan Howard	Washington Bullets	1st	—
G	Reggie Miller	Indiana Pacers	3rd	471,162
C	Alonzo Mourning	Miami Heat	3rd	847,899
F	Glen Rice	Charlotte Hornets	1st	296,143
Head coach: Phil Jackson (Chicago Bulls)

Western Conference All-Stars
Pos	Player	Team	No. of selections	Votes
Starters
G	Jason Kidd	Dallas Mavericks	1st	1,049,946
G	Clyde Drexler	Houston Rockets	9th	1,070,040
F	Charles Barkley	Phoenix Suns	10th	1,268,195
F	Shawn Kemp	Seattle SuperSonics	4th	1,021,384
C	Hakeem Olajuwon	Houston Rockets	11th	1,240,329
Reserves
F	Sean Elliott	San Antonio Spurs	2nd	—
F	Karl Malone	Utah Jazz	9th	986,028
C	Dikembe Mutombo	Denver Nuggets	3rd	369,053
G	Gary Payton	Seattle SuperSonics	3rd	—
G	Mitch Richmond	Sacramento Kings	4th	323,619
C	David Robinson	San Antonio Spurs	7th	1,037,245
G	John Stockton	Utah Jazz	8th	823,826
Head coach: George Karl (Seattle SuperSonics)
