= Squire (disambiguation) =

A squire is a feudal follower of a knight, a lord of the manor, a member of the post-feudal landed gentry, or a modern informal appellation deriving from this.

Squire may also refer to:

== People ==
- Squire (name)

=== Nickname ===
- Jaime Alguersuari, Spanish racing driver and DJ under the stage name Squire
- George W. Ebbert (1810–1890), mountain man and early settler in the Oregon Country
- Squire Gersh (1913–1983), American jazz musician
- Richard "Squire" Lee (1726-1795), Virginian colonist and American politician active in the American Revolutionary War
- Mick Murray (Irish republican) (c. 1936–1999) or Squire Murray, IRA Volunteer named as a ringleader of the Birmingham Pub Bombings
- Dave Taylor (wrestler) (born 1957), English professional wrestler

== Places ==
- Squire, West Virginia, an unincorporated community
- Squire, a community in the township of Georgian Bluffs, Ontario, Canada
- Squire Island, Wilhelm Archipelago, off the coast of Antarctica
- Hundred of Squire, a cadastral unit in South Australia
- Mount Squire, a mountain in British Columbia, Canada

== Transportation ==
- Squire Car Manufacturing Company, a British auto manufacturer of the 1930s
- Ford Squire, a car produced for the United Kingdom market between 1955 and 1959
- Watsonian Squire, a British sidecar manufacturer

== Entertainment ==
- Squire (album), by Alan Hull
- Squire (novel), by Tamora Pierce
- Squire (character), the name of four DC Comics superheroes
- "The Squire", an episode of A Knight of the Seven Kingdoms

== Other ==
- The Squire Law Library, Cambridge, England

== See also ==
- The Squires (disambiguation)
- Squires (disambiguation)
- Squier, a brand of electric guitars
