= Squires (disambiguation) =

Squires were men-at-arms in the service of knights in feudal or medieval times.

Squires may also refer to:

- Squires (surname), with a list of people of this name
- Squires, Missouri, United States
- Columbian Squires, an international youth fraternity
- Jersey Squires, a defunct basketball team
- Petrolia Squires, a Canadian ice hockey team
- Virginia Squires, a basketball franchise

== See also ==
- The Squires (disambiguation)
- USS George P. Squires (SP-303), a United States Navy patrol vessel and minesweeper in commission from 1917 to 1918
- Squires Gate (disambiguation)
