= 2000 NBA Finals =

2000 basketball championship series

Team	Coach	Wins
Los Angeles Lakers	Phil Jackson	4
Indiana Pacers	Larry Bird	2
- Dates: June 7–19
- MVP: Shaquille O'Neal (Los Angeles Lakers)
- Hall of Famers: Lakers: Kobe Bryant (2020); Shaquille O'Neal (2016); Pacers: Reggie Miller (2012); Chris Mullin (2011); Coaches: Larry Bird (1998, player); Phil Jackson (2007); Tex Winter (2011); Officials: Dick Bavetta (2015); Danny Crawford (2025); Hugh Evans (2022)
- Eastern finals: Pacers defeated Knicks, 4–2
- Western finals: Lakers defeated Trail Blazers, 4–3

The 2000 NBA Finals was the championship series of the National Basketball Association's (NBA) 1999–2000 season, and the conclusion of the season's playoffs. The series was played under a best-of-seven format, with the Lakers holding home court advantage. The series featured the number one seeds from both conferences. The Western Conference champion Los Angeles Lakers defeated the Eastern Conference champion Indiana Pacers in six games to win their first NBA championship since 1988 and their twelfth overall.

This marked Indiana's first NBA Finals appearance. The Pacers would not return to the NBA Finals until 2025. Lakers center Shaquille O'Neal was named the NBA Finals Most Valuable Player (MVP) of the series, his first of three consecutive honors, in arguably one of the greatest NBA Finals performances in history, putting up 38.0 points, 16.7 rebounds, and 2.7 blocks per game.

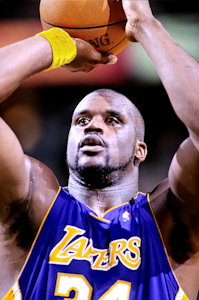
Shaquille O'Neal is one of only three players to win NBA MVP, NBA All-Star Game MVP and NBA Finals MVP awards in the same year (2000).

== Background ==
=== Los Angeles Lakers ===
Although the Lakers were one of the more talented teams in the NBA the previous year, they failed to win a single game against the San Antonio Spurs in the 1999 NBA playoffs. Twenty-four days after being swept by the eventual league champion, the Lakers signed Phil Jackson as head coach. Jackson, famous for coaching Michael Jordan and the six-time champion Chicago Bulls, would build his triangle offense around Shaquille O'Neal and Kobe Bryant. General Manager Jerry West surrounded O'Neal and Bryant with effective role players such as Glen Rice, Ron Harper (who had experience with Jackson's triangle offense as part of the 1996–1998 Bulls), and A.C. Green (who was a member of the last two Lakers championship teams). Another huge change for the Lakers was that it was their inaugural season at the Staples Center (now Crypto.com Arena).

Along with these starters, the Lakers also possessed a strong bench. Robert Horry not only had championship experience with the Houston Rockets but also was a threat on the perimeter and a defensive star. Derek Fisher was a defensively minded point-guard with the ability to shoot well from long range. Rick Fox, acquired after being released by the Boston Celtics, was the Lakers' sixth man.

With a healthy O'Neal, the Lakers dominated the regular season. They posted a 33–7 record after 40 games, the second-best record after 40 games in franchise history, trailing only the 1971-72 Lakers who posted a record of 37–3 after 40 games. They posted winning streaks of 11, 16, and 19 en route to a 67–15 record, tying the 1992 Chicago Bulls and 1986 Boston Celtics as the fifth best record in NBA regular season history.

Although many expected the Lakers to reach the Finals, the road would be a rocky one. In the first round, the Lakers won the first two games against the Sacramento Kings, only to drop the next two games in Sacramento. The Lakers then defeated Sacramento in Game 5, 113–86, to face the Phoenix Suns in the conference semifinals. The Lakers clobbered the Suns, winning the series 4–1 (with their only loss coming in Game 4). In Game 1 of the Western Conference finals against the Portland Trail Blazers, Rasheed Wallace earned two technical fouls and was ejected; the Lakers took advantage of Wallace's absence and secured victory. The Trail Blazers stormed back in the next game, giving the Lakers their worst home loss of the season in a 106–77 shellacking. This setback did not affect Los Angeles, as they assembled a 3–1 series lead by winning the next two games in Portland. The Lakers underestimated the Trail Blazers, however. Led by former Jackson linchpin Scottie Pippen, Portland won back-to-back elimination games and forced a series-deciding Game 7. Amid several controversial foul calls by referee Dick Bavetta against members of the Trail Blazers, Portland relinquished a 75–60 fourth quarter lead. Rallying back with a 25–4 run, the Lakers won the game and secured a berth in the NBA Finals.

=== Indiana Pacers ===
In the 1997–1998 NBA season, the Chicago Bulls narrowly defeated the Pacers, 4 games to 3, in the Eastern Conference finals. The 1998–1999 NBA season began with a lockout but saw Indiana return to the Eastern Conference finals, where they lost to the New York Knicks. The 1999–2000 NBA season brought several major changes to the Pacers. It was their first season at Conseco Fieldhouse (now Gainbridge Fieldhouse), as well as their first since 1993 without center Antonio Davis, who was traded for the rights to the No. 5 overall pick in the 1999 NBA Draft. Jalen Rose replaced Chris Mullin in the starting line up, winning the NBA Most Improved Player award, while Austin Croshere replaced him as the sixth man.

The Pacers started the season 7–7 but eventually finished with an Eastern Conference best 56–26 record, including a franchise-best 25 game win streak at home. The Pacers, like the Lakers, struggled in the playoffs. They needed a clutch Travis Best three-pointer to dispatch the Milwaukee Bucks in five games. Indiana faced the Philadelphia 76ers in the second round and took the series in six games, earning a trip to the Eastern Conference finals. The Pacers would face their rival Knicks, winning a memorable six-game series in a reversal of fortunes from years past. With the victory, Indiana advanced to the first NBA Finals in franchise history, becoming the second former ABA team to do so after the Spurs the previous season.

=== Road to the Finals ===
Los Angeles Lakers (Western Conference champion)		Indiana Pacers (Eastern Conference champion)
# / Western Conference; # / Team / W / L / PCT / GB; 1 / z-Los Angeles Lakers / 67 / 15 / .817 / –; 2 / y-Utah Jazz / 55 / 27 / .671 / 12; 3 / x-Portland Trail Blazers / 59 / 23 / .720 / 8; 4 / x-San Antonio Spurs / 53 / 29 / .646 / 14; 5 / x-Phoenix Suns / 53 / 29 / .646 / 14; 6 / x-Minnesota Timberwolves / 50 / 32 / .610 / 17; 7 / x-Seattle SuperSonics / 45 / 37 / .549 / 22; 8 / x-Sacramento Kings / 44 / 38 / .537 / 23; 9 / Dallas Mavericks / 40 / 42 / .488 / 27; 10 / Denver Nuggets / 35 / 47 / .427 / 32; 11 / Houston Rockets / 34 / 48 / .415 / 33; 12 / Vancouver Grizzlies / 22 / 60 / .268 / 45; 13 / Golden State Warriors / 19 / 63 / .232 / 48; 14 / Los Angeles Clippers / 15 / 67 / .183 / 52; 1st seed in the West, best league record	Regular season	# / Eastern Conference; # / Team / W / L / PCT / GB; 1 / c-Indiana Pacers / 56 / 26 / .683 / –; 2 / y-Miami Heat / 52 / 30 / .634 / 4; 3 / x-New York Knicks / 50 / 32 / .610 / 6; 4 / x-Charlotte Hornets / 49 / 33 / .598 / 7; 5 / x-Philadelphia 76ers / 49 / 33 / .598 / 7; 6 / x-Toronto Raptors / 45 / 37 / .549 / 11; 7 / x-Detroit Pistons / 42 / 40 / .512 / 14; 8 / x-Milwaukee Bucks / 42 / 40 / .512 / 14; 9 / Orlando Magic / 41 / 41 / .500 / 15; 10 / Boston Celtics / 35 / 47 / .427 / 21; 11 / Cleveland Cavaliers / 32 / 50 / .390 / 24; 12 / New Jersey Nets / 31 / 51 / .378 / 25; 13 / Washington Wizards / 29 / 53 / .354 / 27; 14 / Atlanta Hawks / 28 / 54 / .341 / 28; 15 / Chicago Bulls / 17 / 65 / .207 / 39; 1st seed in the East, 3rd best league record
Defeated the (8) Sacramento Kings, 3–2	First round	Defeated the (8) Milwaukee Bucks, 3–2
Defeated the (5) Phoenix Suns, 4–1	Conference semifinals	Defeated the (4) Philadelphia 76ers, 4–2
Defeated the (3) Portland Trail Blazers, 4–3	Conference finals	Defeated the (3) New York Knicks, 4–2

=== Regular season series ===
Both teams split the two meetings, each won by the home team:

January 14, 2000

Los Angeles Lakers 102, Indiana Pacers 111

Conseco Fieldhouse, Indianapolis

March 3, 2000

Indiana Pacers 92, Los Angeles Lakers 107

Staples Center, Los Angeles

== 2000 NBA Finals rosters ==
=== Los Angeles Lakers ===
1999–2000 Los Angeles Lakers roster
Players

Pos.	No.	Player	Height	Weight	DOB	From
G/F	8	Kobe Bryant	6 ft 6 in (1.98 m)	220 lb (100 kg)	1978–08–23	Lower Merion HS (PA)
G	11	John Celestand	6 ft 4 in (1.93 m)	178 lb (81 kg)	1977–03–06	Villanova
G	2	Derek Fisher	6 ft 1 in (1.85 m)	205 lb (93 kg)	1974–08–09	Little Rock
F	17	Rick Fox	6 ft 7 in (2.01 m)	235 lb (107 kg)	1969–07–24	North Carolina
F	3	Devean George	6 ft 8 in (2.03 m)	240 lb (109 kg)	1977–08–29	Augsburg
F	45	A.C. Green	6 ft 9 in (2.06 m)	220 lb (100 kg)	1963–10–04	Oregon State
G	4	Ron Harper	6 ft 6 in (1.98 m)	185 lb (84 kg)	1964–01–20	Miami (OH)
F	5	Robert Horry	6 ft 10 in (2.08 m)	240 lb (109 kg)	1970–08–25	Alabama
C	40	Travis Knight	7 ft 0 in (2.13 m)	235 lb (107 kg)	1974–09–13	Connecticut
G	10	Tyronn Lue	6 ft 0 in (1.83 m)	175 lb (79 kg)	1977–05–03	Nebraska
C	34	Shaquille O'Neal	7 ft 1 in (2.16 m)	338 lb (153 kg)	1972–03–06	LSU
F	41	Glen Rice	6 ft 7 in (2.01 m)	215 lb (98 kg)	1967–05–28	Michigan
F/C	16	John Salley	6 ft 11 in (2.11 m)	190 lb (86 kg)	1964–05–16	Georgia Tech
G	20	Brian Shaw	6 ft 6 in (1.98 m)	205 lb (93 kg)	1966–03–22	UC Santa Barbara

Coaches
Head coach
- Phil Jackson
Assistant(s)
- Tex Winter
- Jim Cleamons
- Frank Hamblen

Legend
- (DP) Unsigned draft pick
- (FA) Free agent
- (S) Suspended
- Injured

Roster
Updated: November 12, 1999

=== Indiana Pacers ===
1999–2000 Indiana Pacers roster
Players

Pos.	No.	Player	Height	Weight	DOB	From
F	24	Jonathan Bender	6 ft 11 in (2.11 m)	202 lb (92 kg)	1981–01–30	Picayune Memorial HS (MS)
G	4	Travis Best	5 ft 11 in (1.80 m)	182 lb (83 kg)	1972–07–12	Georgia Tech
F	44	Austin Croshere	6 ft 9 in (2.06 m)	235 lb (107 kg)	1975–05–01	Providence
F/C	32	Dale Davis	6 ft 11 in (2.11 m)	230 lb (104 kg)	1969–03–25	Clemson
F/C	10	Jeff Foster	6 ft 11 in (2.11 m)	236 lb (107 kg)	1977–01–16	Texas State
F	3	Al Harrington	6 ft 9 in (2.06 m)	230 lb (104 kg)	1980–02–17	St. Patrick HS (NJ)
G	13	Mark Jackson	6 ft 1 in (1.85 m)	180 lb (82 kg)	1965–04–01	St. John's
F	9	Derrick McKey	6 ft 9 in (2.06 m)	205 lb (93 kg)	1966–10–10	Alabama
G/F	31	Reggie Miller	6 ft 7 in (2.01 m)	185 lb (84 kg)	1965–08–24	UCLA
G/F	17	Chris Mullin	6 ft 6 in (1.98 m)	200 lb (91 kg)	1963–07–30	St. John's
F/C	14	Sam Perkins	6 ft 9 in (2.06 m)	235 lb (107 kg)	1961–06–14	North Carolina
G/F	5	Jalen Rose	6 ft 8 in (2.03 m)	210 lb (95 kg)	1973–01–30	Michigan
C	45	Rik Smits	7 ft 4 in (2.24 m)	250 lb (113 kg)	1966–08–23	Marist
C	55	Žan Tabak	7 ft 0 in (2.13 m)	245 lb (111 kg)	1970–06–15	Croatia

Coaches
Head coach
- Larry Bird
Assistant(s)
- Rick Carlisle
- Dick Harter

Legend
- (DP) Unsigned draft pick
- (FA) Free agent
- (S) Suspended
- Injured

Roster

== Series summary ==
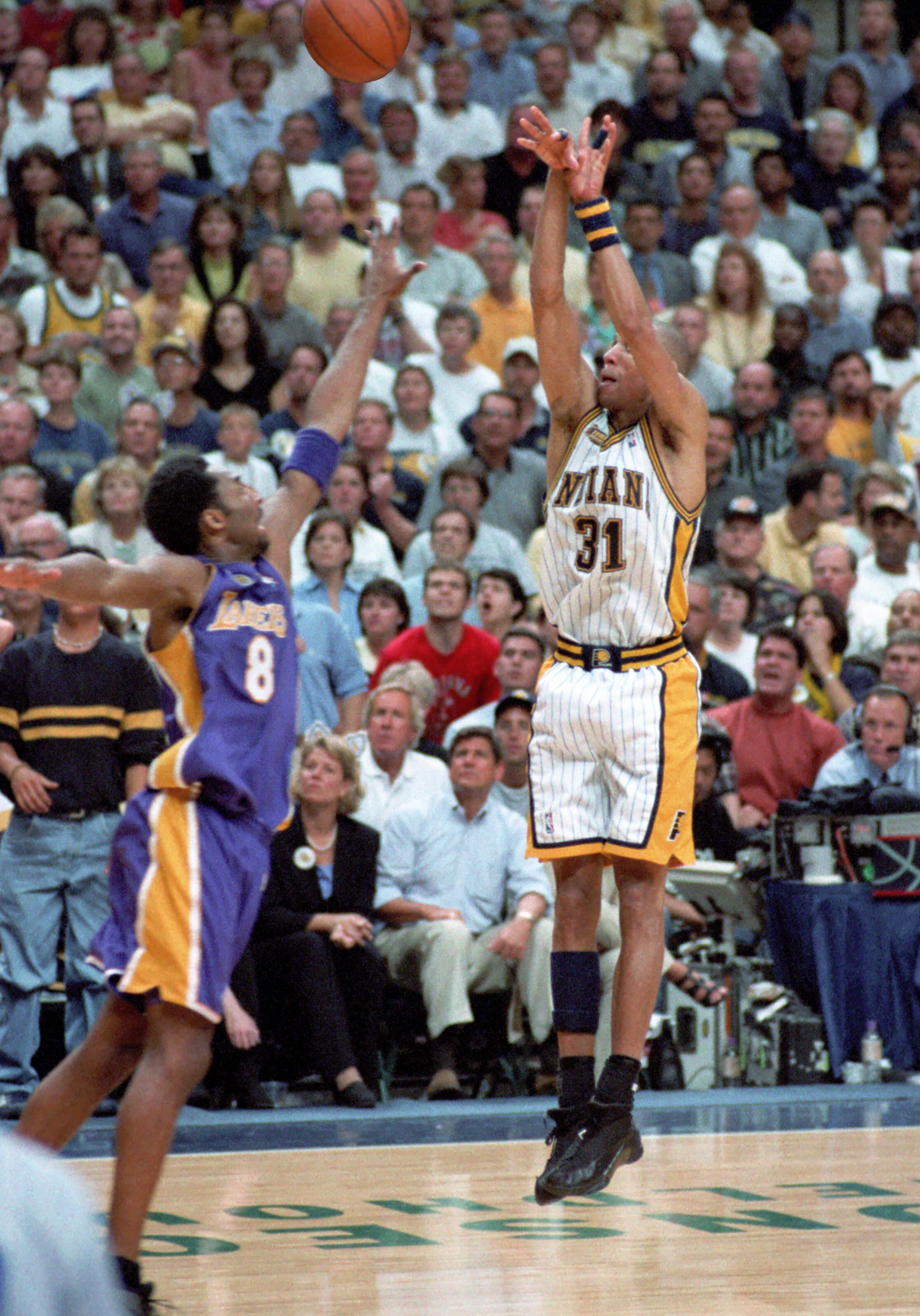
Game 5. Reggie Miller (right) of the Indiana Pacers attempts a shot against Los Angeles' Kobe Bryant (left).

Game	Date	Road team	Result	Home team
Game 1	June 7	Indiana Pacers	87–104 (0–1)	Los Angeles Lakers
Game 2	June 9	Indiana Pacers	104–111 (0–2)	Los Angeles Lakers
Game 3	June 11	Los Angeles Lakers	91–100 (2–1)	Indiana Pacers
Game 4	June 14	Los Angeles Lakers	120–118 (OT) (3–1)	Indiana Pacers
Game 5	June 16	Los Angeles Lakers	87–120 (3–2)	Indiana Pacers
Game 6	June 19	Indiana Pacers	111–116 (2–4)	Los Angeles Lakers

The Finals were played using a 2–3–2 site format, where the team with home court advantage would receive the first two games and the last two games at home. The NBA, after experimenting in the early years, restored this original format for the Finals in 1985. So far, the other playoff series are still running on a 2–2–1–1–1 site format. The Finals returned to a 2–2–1–1–1 format in 2014. Additionally, both teams in the Finals featured newly built arenas, as the Lakers' Staples Center and the Pacers' Gainbridge Fieldhouse opened at the beginning of the 1999–2000 NBA season.

This was the second time a Finals game was played on a Monday night since the NBA switched to the Wednesday-Friday-Sunday rotation in 1991. In the previous five series (1992–94, 1996, 1998) that needed a Game 6, the game was played on a Sunday. In this series, however, the NBA chose to play the game the Monday night after Father's Day. The previous Finals game played on a Monday night was Game 3 in 1999.

=== Game 1 ===
NBC

June 7
9:30 pm ET (6:30 pm PT)

Recap at the Wayback Machine (archived February 10, 2001)

Indiana Pacers 87, Los Angeles Lakers 104
Scoring by quarter: 18–33, 25–22, 28–22, 16–27
Pts: Mark Jackson 18; Rebs: Dale Davis 8 Asts: Mark Jackson 7	Pts: Shaquille O'Neal 43; Rebs: Shaquille O'Neal 19; Asts: Bryant, Harper 5 each
L.A. Lakers lead the series, 1–0

Staples Center, Los Angeles, California
Attendance: 18,997
Referees:
- No. 43 Dan Crawford
- No. 35 Jack Nies
- No. 31 Terry Durham

The Lakers dominated from the start. The Lakers shot 15-for-20 (75%) in the first period while the Pacers shot only 7-for-20 (35%). Reggie Miller would miss all of his shots in the first quarter to give the Lakers a 15-point lead. Austin Croshere came off the bench to keep the Pacers alive in the 2nd quarter, scoring 9 points and grabbing 4 rebounds in the quarter. Although the Pacers attempted a comeback in the 2nd quarter, they were still down by 12. In the 3rd quarter, it would be Mark Jackson who led the Pacers to a comeback, cutting the Lakers lead to 2. Reggie Miller also hit his first field goal in the 3rd quarter, though it would be his last. The Lakers handled the Pacers in the final quarter, with a 13–2 run winning by 17 points. Shaquille O'Neal scored 43 points and grabbed 19 rebounds.

=== Game 2 ===
NBC

June 9
9:30 pm ET (6:30 pm PT)

Recap at the Wayback Machine (archived February 10, 2001)

Indiana Pacers 104, Los Angeles Lakers 111
Scoring by quarter: 28–28, 21–24, 20–21, 35–38
Pts: Jalen Rose 30; Rebs: Dale Davis 10; Asts: Mark Jackson 8	Pts: Shaquille O'Neal 40; Rebs: Shaquille O'Neal 24; Asts: Brian Shaw 7
L.A. Lakers lead the series, 2–0

Staples Center, Los Angeles, California
Attendance: 18,997
Referees:
- No. 17 Joe Crawford
- No. 15 Bennett Salvatore
- No. 32 Ed F. Rush

Los Angeles and Indiana were evenly matched for the first quarter, both scoring 28. However, Los Angeles suffered a major setback when Kobe Bryant left the game in the 1st quarter due to a sprained ankle and did not return. Jalen Rose later admitted that he intentionally stuck out his foot when Kobe shot a jumpshot in order to trip him when he landed. Ron Harper went in for Bryant and scored 21 points for the game. Desperate to try to gain the lead, Larry Bird resorted to the "Hack-a-Shaq" strategy. Shaq shot 39 free throws, making only 18, an NBA record for most free throws attempted. Despite this low percentage, Shaq made 9 of 16 in the 4th quarter to keep a Lakers lead. The Pacers cut the lead to 99–96 and were looking to foul Shaq, but when Shaq got the ball he passed to Robert Horry who converted not only the layup, but the foul shot as well giving them a 102–96 lead en route to a 111–104 Lakers victory. Shaq led both teams with 40 points and 24 rebounds. Kobe, who left the game in the 1st quarter, scored a total of only 2 points in game 2, the lowest number of points he has ever scored in the NBA Finals during his career.

=== Game 3 ===
NBC

June 11
7:30 pm ET

Recap at the Wayback Machine (archived February 4, 2001)

Los Angeles Lakers 91, Indiana Pacers 100
Scoring by quarter: 15–23, 27–30, 24–26, 25–21
Pts: Shaquille O'Neal 33; Rebs: Shaquille O'Neal 13; Asts: Derek Fisher 10	Pts: Reggie Miller 33; Rebs: Dale Davis 12; Asts: Mark Jackson 6
L.A. Lakers lead the series, 2–1

Conseco Fieldhouse, Indianapolis, Indiana
Attendance: 18,345
Referees:
- No. 10 Ron Garretson
- No. 7 Bernie Fryer
- No. 25 Hugh Evans

Taking advantage of Kobe Bryant's ankle injury, Indiana restored a semblance of parity to the proceedings. Kobe's absence was felt as the Pacers had an 11–2 run in the first quarter to take an 8-point lead. Austin Croshere once again had another huge 2nd quarter, scoring 8 points as the Pacers shot 61% from the field. The Lakers tried to make a run to get back into the game, but upon doing so, Indiana answered with 12 straight points and led by 17. The Lakers were desperate and attempted another run to get within 3 points, but Reggie Miller nailed all his free throws at the end of the game to give Indiana a 9-point win.

=== Game 4 ===
NBC

June 14
9:30 pm ET

Recap at the Wayback Machine (archived February 4, 2001)

Los Angeles Lakers 120, Indiana Pacers 118 (OT)
Scoring by quarter: 23–33, 28–21, 29–23, 24–27, Overtime: 16–14
Pts: Shaquille O'Neal 36; Rebs: Shaquille O'Neal 21; Asts: Kobe Bryant 5	Pts: Reggie Miller 35; Rebs: Dale Davis 8 Asts: Mark Jackson 8
L.A. Lakers lead the series, 3–1

Conseco Fieldhouse, Indianapolis, Indiana
Attendance: 18,345
Referees:
- No. 27 Dick Bavetta
- No. 29 Steve Javie
- No. 34 Ronnie Nunn

External videos
- Full game broadcast by NBC on YouTube

The Pacers took a quick 9–2 lead due to Rik Smits hitting his first four shots. Kobe Bryant attempted to play with his sore ankle but only managed to score 6 points in the first half. Even though Bryant and O'Neal were in foul trouble in the first half (each picking up his third with 5 minutes remaining in the second quarter), Indiana could not take advantage and did not extend their lead. This would be a problem as Kobe Bryant scored 10 points and the Lakers took a 62–60 lead due to a Glen Rice three-pointer. The game remained close going into the fourth quarter, when O'Neal and Reggie Miller scored 14 and 13 points respectively, sending the game into overtime. Midway through overtime, O'Neal committed his sixth foul but 21-year-old Bryant delivered three clutch shots, as the Lakers were able to overcome back-up center John Salley's inability to effectively defend Smits. Smits and Miller scored all 14 of Indiana's OT points, but it was not enough to overcome, as Miller missed a last-second three-pointer, and L.A. was able to pull one out in Indianapolis. Shaquille O'Neal was the first final NBA MVP player to foul out in the NBA Finals until Stephen Curry of the Golden State Warriors fouled out in Game 6 of the 2016 NBA Finals.

=== Game 5 ===
NBC

June 16
9:30 pm ET

Recap at the Wayback Machine (archived February 4, 2001)

Los Angeles Lakers 87, Indiana Pacers 120
Scoring by quarter: 28–39, 17–25, 22–22, 20–34
Pts: Shaquille O'Neal 35; Rebs: Shaquille O'Neal 11; Asts: Ron Harper 5	Pts: Jalen Rose 32; Rebs: Austin Croshere 9 Asts: Mark Jackson 7
L.A. Lakers lead the series, 3–2

Conseco Fieldhouse, Indianapolis, Indiana
Attendance: 18,345
Referees:
- No. 15 Bennett Salvatore
- No. 35 Jack Nies
- No. 43 Dan Crawford

Reggie Miller and the Pacers dominated the game from the start in what would be Larry Bird's last game as a coach in the state of Indiana. Reggie Miller came out and made 5 straight shots including a 4-point play. The Pacers hit their first 6 three point shots in the game. The Pacers would have a 20-point lead in the 2nd quarter, and eventually won by 33 – it was the worst Lakers NBA Finals loss since the 148–114 loss to Boston in the 1985 NBA Finals, known as the "Memorial Day Massacre."

With their loss in Game 5, the Lakers record in close-out games dropped to 3–6 in the 2000 NBA Playoffs (the other losses coming in Games 3 and 4 in the first round against Sacramento, Game 4 in the series against Phoenix, and Games 5 and 6 versus Portland). As a result, the series returned to California. Nonetheless, Shaq again led both teams with 35 points and 11 rebounds. Kobe had a poor shooting performance in game 5, scored just 8 total points on 4-20 (20%) shooting.

=== Game 6 ===
NBC

June 19
9:30 pm ET (6:30 pm PT)

Recap at the Wayback Machine (archived February 10, 2001)

Indiana Pacers 111, Los Angeles Lakers 116
Scoring by quarter: 26–24, 30–29, 28–26, 27–37
Pts: Jalen Rose 29; Rebs: Dale Davis 14; Asts: Mark Jackson 11	Pts: Shaquille O'Neal 41; Rebs: Shaquille O'Neal 12; Asts: Ron Harper 9
L.A. Lakers win the NBA Finals, 4–2

Staples Center, Los Angeles, California
Attendance: 18,997
Referees:
- No. 25 Hugh Evans
- No. 10 Ron Garretson
- No. 17 Joe Crawford

After the two teams traded blows in the first quarter, Mark Jackson concluded the period with a turn-around half-court shot at the buzzer to give the Pacers a 26–24 advantage. They would not relinquish their lead until the fourth quarter. In the first half, the Pacers would lead by as many as twelve points. However, the Lakers chipped away and entered intermission trailing 56–53. Indiana added two more points to their lead, and entered the final period in a position to force a decisive seventh game.

In the fourth quarter, the momentum shifted. The Lakers got four timely three-pointers from Derek Fisher, Robert Horry, and Rick Fox. The turning point occurred on a play where Brian Shaw stole the ball from Jalen Rose, leading to a fast break where Shaquille O'Neal hit an off-balance shot to give the Lakers the lead. The Pacers never led after that point.

The Lakers would build a seven-point lead, but the Pacers fought back to tie the score at 103. After a timeout, the Lakers scored six unanswered points to regain control. The Pacers made one final valiant effort, but it fell short and the Lakers clinched their first championship in twelve years. Shaquille O'Neal led all scorers with 41 points and also pulled down 12 rebounds. He was awarded the Finals MVP.

== Player statistics ==
Legend
GP	Games played	GS	Games started	MPG	Minutes per game
FG%	Field-goal percentage	3P%	3-point field-goal percentage	FT%	Free-throw percentage
RPG	Rebounds per game	APG	Assists per game	SPG	Steals per game
BPG	Blocks per game	PPG	Points per game

Los Angeles Lakers

Los Angeles Lakers statistics
Player	GP	GS	MPG	FG%	3P%	FT%	RPG	APG	SPG	BPG	PPG
Kobe Bryant	5	5	35.2	.367	.200	.909	4.6	4.2	1.0	1.4	15.6
Derek Fisher	6	0	18.7	.429	.583	.833	1.0	3.8	0.8	0.0	6.0
Rick Fox	6	0	17.3	.611	.625	.867	1.7	1.0	0.5	0.0	6.7
Devean George	1	0	3.0	.000	.000	.500	1.0	0.0	0.0	0.0	1.0
A.C. Green	6	6	17.2	.571	.000	.857	3.3	0.5	0.2	0.0	5.0
Ron Harper	6	6	30.7	.464	.400	.700	3.3	4.8	1.3	0.2	10.8
Robert Horry	6	0	30.3	.512	.200	.727	5.2	2.8	0.8	1.0	9.2
Travis Knight	4	0	2.3	.667	.000	0.5	0.5	0.0	0.0	0.0	1.3
Shaquille O'Neal	6	6	45.5	.611	.000	.387	16.7	2.3	1.0	2.7	38.0
Glen Rice	6	6	32.2	.400	.632	.650	2.5	1.7	0.8	0.2	11.5
John Salley	4	0	3.3	.667	.000	.000	0.8	0.0	0.3	0.0	1.0
Brian Shaw	6	1	18.8	.216	.000	1.000	2.8	2.8	0.3	0.0	3.0

Indiana Pacers

Indiana Pacers statistics
Player	GP	GS	MPG	FG%	3P%	FT%	RPG	APG	SPG	BPG	PPG
Jonathan Bender	2	0	3.0	.667	.000	.750	0.5	0.0	0.5	0.0	3.5
Travis Best	6	0	16.3	.467	.500	.833	1.2	2.2	0.7	0.2	5.8
Austin Croshere	6	0	24.2	.545	.400	.867	6.0	0.8	0.3	1.0	15.2
Dale Davis	6	6	29.5	.575	.000	.545	10.0	1.0	0.3	1.0	8.7
Mark Jackson	6	6	31.0	.413	.400	0.8	5.3	7.7	0.8	0.0	9.7
Derrick McKey	6	0	12.0	.500	.500	.667	3.2	0.2	0.3	0.2	1.8
Reggie Miller	6	6	42.0	.413	.375	.978	2.7	3.7	0.8	0.3	24.3
Chris Mullin	3	0	4.0	.500	.000	.667	.000	0.3	0.3	0.3	1.3
Sam Perkins	6	0	21.8	.379	.478	.750	4.0	1.0	0.5	0.0	6.0
Jalen Rose	6	6	43.2	.467	.500	.833	4.5	3.0	0.8	0.3	23.0
Rik Smits	6	6	19.3	.466	.000	1.000	4.0	0.5	0.5	1.2	10.0
Žan Tabak	3	0	3.7	.500	.000	.000	0.3	0.0	0.0	0.0	0.7

== Broadcasting ==
The 2000 NBA Finals was aired in the United States on NBC (including KNBC in Los Angeles and WTHR in Indianapolis) with Bob Costas and Doug Collins on play-by-play and color commentary respectively. Even though Marv Albert had been rehired by NBC Sports in 1999 following his infamous sex scandal, NBC opted to keep Costas as the lead play-by-play man to avoid any negative publicity. Albert was eventually promoted back to the lead role before the succeeding season.

Hannah Storm served as the studio host while Isiah Thomas, Bill Walton and Steve "Snapper" Jones served as studio analysts. Ahmad Rashad and Jim Gray served as sideline reporters.

== Aftermath ==
This was the first NBA championship for the Lakers since 1988. It was also the first major professional sports championship for the city of Los Angeles since that same year, when the Dodgers won the 1988 World Series. The Lakers’ twelve-year drought between championships from 1988 to 2000 was the longest for the franchise since going eighteen years without winning a championship from 1954 to 1972. This championship came in the Lakers’ first year in their new arena, Staples Center. The Lakers held a championship parade on June 21, 2000.

After a power struggle that developed between longtime Lakers general manager Jerry West and head coach Phil Jackson, West left the Lakers after the season and would take the Memphis Grizzlies general manager job in 2002. The Lakers went on to score a “three-peat” when they won the NBA championship in 2001 and 2002, making them the first team to open a new arena with three straight NBA championships. However, the Lakers were unable to score home-court advantage throughout the playoffs in the latter two, yielding them to the San Antonio Spurs and Sacramento Kings, respectively; still, the Lakers were able to beat both of those teams in the Conference finals. They won the championship over the Philadelphia 76ers and New Jersey Nets, respectively.

The Pacers rebuilt in their next season. Retiring center Rik Smits was replaced by future NBA All-Star Jermaine O'Neal, acquired from Portland in the deal for Dale Davis. Mark Jackson and Chris Mullin both left as free-agents. Larry Bird resigned as head coach; he would later resurface as President of Basketball Operations in 2003. The Pacers continued to make the playoffs every season until 2006, the year after Reggie Miller retired.

The Lakers and the Pacers would meet again 23 years later in the championship game of the inaugural NBA In-Season Tournament, with the Lakers winning 123–109. The Pacers returned to the NBA Finals in 2025, their second NBA Finals appearance in franchise history, losing to the Oklahoma City Thunder.

=== Riots ===
During the Lakers' victory on June 18, an estimated crowd of over 30,000 fans gathered outside Staples Center to view the game and later celebrate the victory. However; as the crowd grew during the night following the victory, fans began acting unruly until the celebrations devolved into a riot. Fans began lighting numerous bonfires or torching nearby cars in the street, things devolved quickly as vandals also began looting and vandalizing nearby buildings. LAPD was criticized for its late response hours after the damage began, there was no released total of the overall property damage (sources estimate approximately $500,000), but 70 cars and a local dealership were destroyed. Upon seeing the destruction following the victory, owner Dr. Jerry Buss and Magic Johnson would heavily condemn the vandalism and urge fans to leave the area and celebrate in peace. LAPD were forced to re evaluate their security plans for that election year's Democratic National Convention following the destruction.

== See also ==
- 2000 NBA playoffs
