= 1984–85 Ohio Bobcats men's basketball team =

American college basketball season

1984–85 Ohio Bobcats men's basketball

MAC Regular season and MAC tournament champions

NCAA tournament, First Round
- Conference: Mid-American Conference
- Record: 22–8 (14–4 MAC)
- Head coach: Danny Nee (5th season)
- Home arena: Convocation Center

1984–85 Mid-American Conference men's basketball standings
	Conf.				Overall
Team	W		L	PCT	W		L	PCT
Ohio †	14	–	4	.778	22	–	8	.733
Miami	13	–	5	.722	20	–	11	.645
Toledo	11	–	7	.611	16	–	12	.571
Kent State	11	–	7	.611	17	–	13	.567
Eastern Michigan	9	–	9	.500	15	–	13	.536
Ball State	8	–	10	.444	13	–	16	.448
Western Michigan	7	–	11	.389	12	–	16	.429
Northern Illinois	7	–	11	.389	11	–	16	.407
Bowling Green	6	–	12	.333	12	–	15	.444
Central Michigan	4	–	14	.222	9	–	18	.333
† 1985 MAC tournament winner Rankings from AP Poll

The 1984–85 Ohio Bobcats men's basketball team represented Ohio University as a member of the Mid-American Conference in the college basketball season of 1984–85. The team was coached by Danny Nee in his fifth season at Ohio. They played their home games at Convocation Center. The Bobcats finished with a record of 22–8 and won the MAC regular season championship with a conference record of 14–4. They won the MAC tournament with wins over Kent State and Miami (OH). They received a bid to the NCAA tournament. There they lost to Kansas in the first round.

== Schedule ==
Date time, TV	Rank^{#}	Opponent^{#}	Result	Record	Site (attendance) city, state
Non-conference regular season
11/24/1984*		St. Francis (PA)	W 94–84	1–0	
12/1/1984*		at No. 12 Indiana	L 73–90	1–1	
12/7/1984*		at Wichita State; McDonald’s Classic	W 56–55	2–1	
12/8/1984*		vs. Illinois-Chicago; McDonald’s Classic	L 64–72	2–2	
12/12/1984*		Ohio Wesleyan	W 75–67	3–2	
12/15/1984*		Heidelberg	W 77–70	4–2	
12/16/1984*		at Marshall	W 76–71	5–2	
12/28/1984*		vs. San Jose State; Basketball Classic	L 62–67	5–3	
12/29/1984*		vs. Eastern Kentucky; Basketball Classic	W 58–52	6–3	
MAC regular season
1/3/1985		Miami (OH)	W 73–62	7–3 (1–0)	
1/5/1985		at Western Michigan	L 79–84	7–4 (1–1)	
1/9/1985		at Central Michigan	W 75–66	8–4 (2–1)	
1/12/1985		Bowling Green	W 79–57	9–4 (3–1)	
1/16/1985		at Eastern Michigan	W 73–66	10–4 (4–1)	
1/19/1985		Toledo	W 62–55	11-4 (5–1)	
1/23/1985		at Northern Illinois	W 50–42	12-4 (6–1)	
1/26/1985		Kent State	W 77–58	13–4 (7–1)	
1/29/1985		at Ball State	W 60–58	14–4 (8–1)	
2/2/1985		Western Michigan	W 62–54	15–4 (9–1)	
2/6/1985		Central Michigan	W 56–52	16–4 (10–1)	
2/9/1985		at Bowling Green	W 60–56	17–4 (11–1)	
2/13/1985		Eastern Michigan	W 71–61	18–4 (12–1)	
2/16/1985		at Toledo	L 65–72	18–5 (12–2)	
2/19/1985		Northern Illinois	W 72–49	19–5 (13–2)	
2/23/1985		at Kent State	L 66–76	19–6 (13–3)	
2/27/1985		Ball State	W 64–56	20–6 (14–3)	
3/2/1985		at Miami (OH)	L 66–67	20–7 (14–4)	
MAC tournament
3/8/1985		vs. Kent State; Semifinal	W 57–55	21–7 (15–4)	
3/9/1985		vs. Miami (OH); Championship	W 74–64	22–7 (16–4)	
NCAA tournament
3/14/1985*		vs. No. 13 Kansas; Mideast Regional First Round	L 38–49	22–8	
*Non-conference game. ^{#}Rankings from AP Poll. (#) Tournament seedings in parentheses. All times are in Eastern Time.

== Statistics ==
=== Team statistics ===
Final 1984–85 statistics

Record	Ohio	OPP
Scoring	2014	1887
Scoring Average	67.13	62.90
Field goals – Att	773–1636	697–1567
Free throws – Att	468–681	493–719
Rebounds	1038	984
Assists	466	409
Turnovers		
Steals		
Blocked Shots		

=== Player statistics ===
			Minutes		Scoring		Total FGs			Free-Throws			Rebounds						
Player	GP	GS	Tot	Avg	Pts	Avg	FG	FGA	Pct	FT	FTA	Pct	Tot	Avg	A	PF	TO	Stl	Blk
Vic Alexander	27				390	14.7	161	300	0.537	68	106	0.642	195	2.4	13				
Robert Tatum	25				368	14.4	136	301	0.452	96	115	0.835	60	7.2	77				
Rick Scarberry	30				321	10.7	146	324	0.451	29	39	0.744	51	1.7	56				
Eddie Hicks	29				280	9.7	94	181	0.519	92	123	0.748	195	6.7	25				
Paul Baron	30				273	9.1	80	163	0.491	113	150	0.753	119	4.0	190				
Eddie Washington	29				128	4.4	56	126	0.444	16	29	0.552	35	1.2	53				
Henry Smith	25				90	3.6	32	77	0.416	26	63	0.413	99	4.0	15				
Rich Stanfel	28				65	2.5	28	72	0.389	9	16	0.563	93	1.5	7				
Marty Lehmann	15				38	2.3	17	35	0.486	4	7	0.571	22	3.3	4				
John Rhodes	15				28	1.9	9	24	0.375	10	17	0.588	38	2.5	3				
Jamie Brock	12				21	1.8	10	14	0.714	1	5	0.200	12	1.0	2				
Roger Smith	15				12	0.8	4	19	0.211	4	11	0.364	12	0.8	21				
Total	30	-	0	-	2014	67.1	773	1636	0.472	468	681	0.687	1038	34.6	466	630			
Opponents	30	-	0	-	1887	62.9	697	1567	0.445	493	719	0.686	984	32.8	409	612			

Legend
GP	Games played	GS	Games started	Avg	Average per game
FG	Field-goals made	FGA	Field-goal attempts	Off	Offensive rebounds
Def	Defensive rebounds	A	Assists	TO	Turnovers
Blk	Blocks	Stl	Steals	High	Team high
