= Ron Harper =

American basketball player (born 1964)

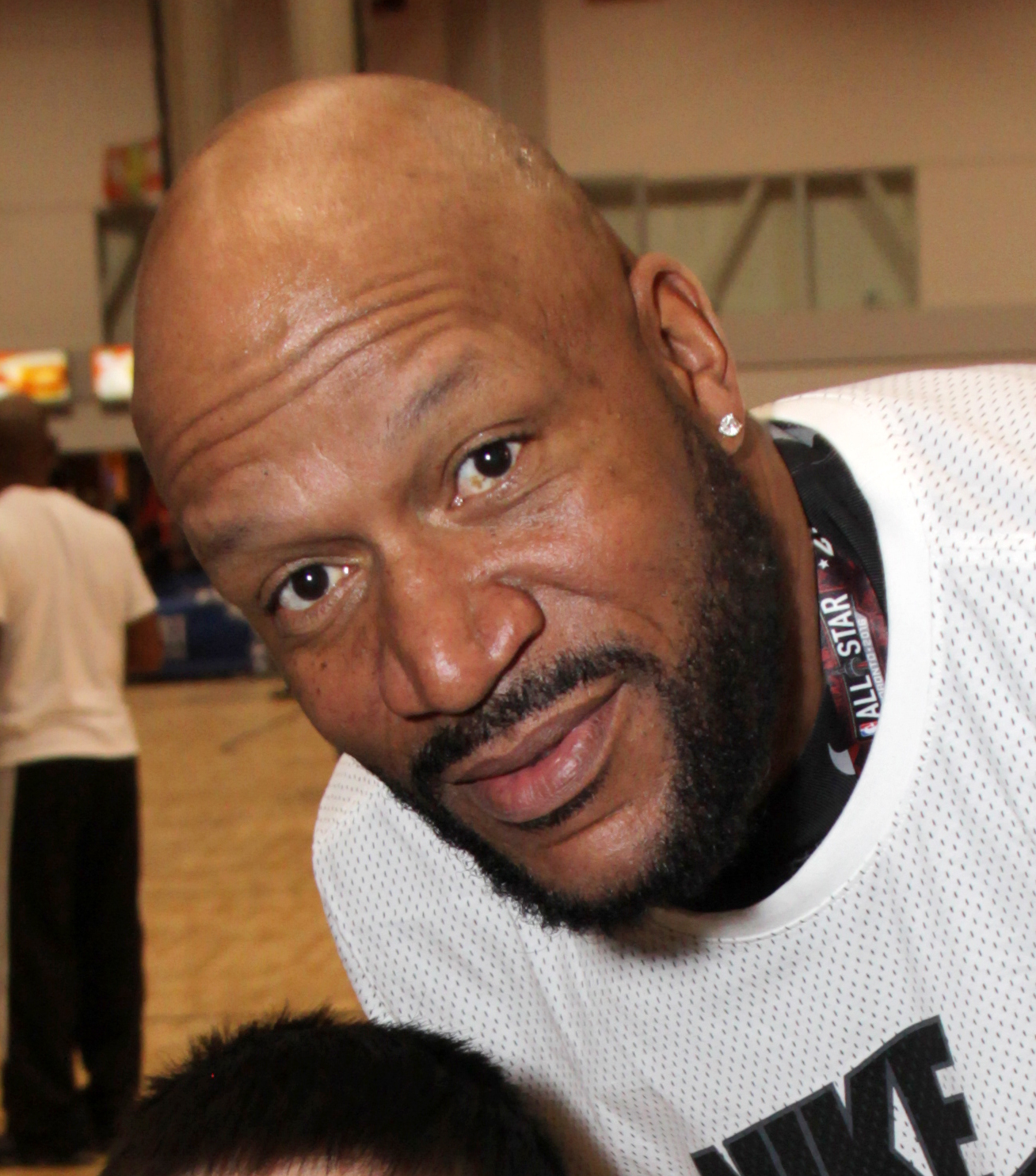
- Harper in 2016

Personal information
- Born: January 20, 1964 (age 62) Dayton, Ohio, U.S.
- Listed height: 6 ft 6 in (1.98 m)
- Listed weight: 215 lb (98 kg)

Career information
- High school: Kiser (Dayton, Ohio)
- College: Miami (Ohio) (1982–1986)
- NBA draft: 1986: 1st round, 8th overall pick
- Drafted by: Cleveland Cavaliers
- Playing career: 1986–2001
- Position: Shooting guard / point guard
- Number: 4, 9
- Coaching career: 2005–2007

Career history

Playing
- 1986–1989: Cleveland Cavaliers
- 1989–1994: Los Angeles Clippers
- 1994–1999: Chicago Bulls
- 1999–2001: Los Angeles Lakers

Coaching
- 2005–2007: Detroit Pistons (assistant)

Career highlights
- 5× NBA champion (1996–1998, 2000, 2001); NBA All-Rookie First Team (1987); Consensus second-team All-American (1986); 2× MAC Player of the Year (1985, 1986); MAC Tournament MVP (1985); 3× First-team All-MAC (1984–1986); MAC Freshman of the Year (1983); No. 34 retired by Miami RedHawks; MAC Hall of Fame (2023)

Career statistics
- Points: 13,910 (13.8 ppg)
- Rebounds: 4,309 (4.3 rpg)
- Assist: 3,915 (3.9 apg)
- Stats at NBA.com
- Stats at Basketball Reference
Medals
Men's basketball
Representing United States
Summer Universiade
Silver medal – second place	1985 Kobe	National team

Ronald Harper Sr. (born January 20, 1964) is an American former professional basketball player. He played for four teams in the National Basketball Association (NBA) between 1986 and 2001 and is a five-time NBA champion. His sons Dylan Harper and Ron Harper Jr. both currently play in the NBA.

== Early life ==
Ronald Harper Sr. was born on January 20, 1964, in Dayton, Ohio. Harper was the youngest of six children.

In high school, he first attended Belmont High School in Dayton, but was cut from the freshman team and didn't play as a sophomore. He later transferred to Kiser High School in Dayton and as a senior averaged 20.5 points, 13.4 rebounds, five assists, five steals and six blocked shots and was named first-team All-Ohio. He graduated from Kiser in 1982.

The Kiser High School facility is now an elementary school. In 2006, Harper attended a ceremony at which the school's gymnasium was named for him.

== College career ==
Harper starred at Miami University in Oxford, Ohio, for four seasons from 1982–83 through 1985–86.

As a freshman, Harper scored 12.8 points per game and led Miami in rebounding with 7.0 per game as the team went 13–15. As a sophomore, he led the team in scoring with 16.3 points per game and in rebounding with 7.6 per game, as Miami went 24–6 and won the Mid-American Conference championship, the MAC tournament championship, and earned a berth in the NCAA tournament.

In his junior season, he set personal bests and again led the team with 24.9 and 10.7 rebounds per game and also led in steals with 2.6 per game. He was named MAC Player of the Year as the team went 20–11, finished second in the MAC and earned a berth in the NCAA tournament.

In his junior season, on March 8, 1985, he set both a Miami and a MAC tournament single-game scoring record of 45 points in one game (as well as snaring 18 rebounds). His scoring average of 24.9 per game is second all-time at Miami behind Fred Foster's 26.8 in 1967–68. He again led the team in rebounding with 11.7 per game as well as assists (4.3) and steals (3.3). He also became the first MAC player in history to record a triple-double with 38 points, 19 rebounds and 12 assists against Ball State University.

Again he was named MAC Player of the Year and also named second-team All-American by both the Associated Press (AP) and United Press International (UPI). Miami went 24–7 to win the MAC title and earn a berth in the NCAA tournament.

Harper is Miami's all-time leading scorer with 2,377 points, and also leads in rebounding with 1,119. He was the first men's player in MAC history to score 2,000 points and grab 1,000 rebounds in a career. He also holds Miami's all-time records for career scoring average (19.8), games started (118), minutes played (4,164), field goals (969), and blocked shots (173). He had a career field goal percentage of .534. Harper is also the school's record holder in career steals (287), and holds/shares 19 other school records.

At his final home game in 1986, he became the first basketball player in Miami history to have his number (34) retired.

== Professional career ==
=== Cleveland Cavaliers (1986–1989) ===
Harper was selected in the first round (eighth overall) in the 1986 NBA draft by the Cleveland Cavaliers. Harper made his NBA debut on November 1, 1986. He broke 30 points in just his sixth game, with 34 against the Sacramento Kings on November 11, 1986. He scored a season-high 40 points against the Boston Celtics on February 4, 1987, and had one of his finest all-around games on February 10, 1987, against the New York Knicks with 25 points, 16 rebounds, four assists and five steals.

Harper started all 82 games and averaged 22.9 points per game (ppg) and 4.8 rebounds per game (rpg) along with 4.8 assists and 2.5 steals. He placed second in Rookie of the Year balloting behind Chuck Person of the Indiana Pacers.

In his second season, he was limited to 57 games due to a severely sprained ankle suffered in the second game of the season that kept him out until late December. For the season, he averaged 15.4 ppg. The Cavaliers made the playoffs, but were eliminated by the Chicago Bulls, three games to two.

The following season, 1988–89, he again started all 82 games, averaging 18.6 ppg, 5.0 rpg, 5.3 assists and 2.3 steals as the Cavaliers advanced to the playoffs, where they were eliminated in the first round, again by the Chicago Bulls three games to two, this time with a one-point loss in game 5 on the Cavaliers’ home court — the now-defunct Richfield Coliseum. This game was ended by The Shot.

=== Los Angeles Clippers (1989–1994) ===
In his fourth season, 1989–90, after seven games with the Cavaliers, on November 16, 1989, Harper was traded to the Los Angeles Clippers, alongside two first-round draft picks and a second-round draft pick, for Reggie Williams and Danny Ferry, the latter having refused to play for the Clippers.

Harper started all 28 games he played for the Clippers, but his season was cut short by a serious right knee injury suffered in a game in January 1990. Diagnosed with both a torn anterior cruciate ligament and torn cartilage, he underwent surgery.

For the 1989–90 season overall, he averaged 22.8 ppg, 5.9 rpg, 5.2 assists, 2.3 steals and a career-high 1.2 blocks per game. His season was highlighted by back-to-back 39-point games against Denver and Indiana in December 1989, both of which the Clippers won.

In his next season, 1990–91, he was limited to 39 games due to a knee injury, but still posted averages of 19.6 ppg and 4.8 rpg along with 5.4 assists and 1.7 steals

By 1991–92, his sixth NBA season, he bounced back to start all 82 games, averaging 18.2 ppg, 5.5 rpg, 5.1 assists and 1.9 steals. as the Clippers advanced to the playoffs, where they were eliminated three games to two by the Utah Jazz.

In 1992–93, Harper was named a co-captain (alongside Danny Manning and Mark Jackson). In 80 games (77 as a starter), Harper averaged 18.0 ppg, 5.3 rpg, 4.5 assists and 2.2 steals. The Clippers again made the playoffs, but yet again Harper's team was eliminated in the first round, this time three games to two by the Houston Rockets.

In 1993–94, his fourth full season with the Clippers and eighth in the NBA, he played and started in 75 games, averaging 20.1 ppg, 6.1 rpg, 4.6 assists and 1.9 steals. On March 11, 1994, he tallied a triple-double with 26 points, 10 rebounds and 10 assists along with six steals in a win over the Dallas Mavericks. Two nights later, he came within one assist of duplicating the feat, with 39 points, 11 rebounds, nine assists plus another six steals in a win over the Golden State Warriors.

=== Chicago Bulls (1994–1999) ===
On September 15, 1994, Harper signed a free-agent deal with the Chicago Bulls, who were reloading following the first retirement of Michael Jordan. Harper found his niche with the Bulls upon Jordan's return, eventually becoming a fan favorite by reinventing himself as a big perimeter defender, ball handler, and mid-range scorer.

In his first season in Chicago, 1994–95, Harper started 53 of the 77 games he played, although his minutes dipped to 19.9 per game and he averaged a then-career low of 6.9 ppg. For the first time in Harper's career, his team advanced past the first round of the playoffs, as the Bulls defeated the Charlotte Hornets three games to one before losing to the Orlando Magic four games to two in the conference semifinals.

In 1995–96, Harper's 10th NBA season, he played in and started 80 games, with his playing time increasing to 23.6 minutes per game and his scoring average to 7.4 ppg. It was a record-setting season for the Bulls as the team, coached by Phil Jackson and led by Jordan and Scottie Pippen and with Harper playing a key role, had a then NBA all-time best record of 72–10. They then defeated the Miami Heat, New York Knicks, and Orlando Magic in the first three rounds of the playoffs en route to winning their fourth NBA championship four games to two over the Seattle SuperSonics.

In 1996–97, he played in 76 games, starting 74 and averaging 6.3 ppg. The Bulls had another dominant regular season with a record of 69–13 as they defeated the Washington Bullets, Atlanta Hawks and Miami Heat in the first three rounds of the playoffs en route to winning their fifth NBA championship, this time four games to two over the Utah Jazz.

In 1997–98, Harper's 12th NBA season, he started all 82 games for the Bulls, increasing his minutes per game to 27.9 and his scoring average to 9.3 ppg. The Bulls had a regular-season record of 62–20 as they defeated the New Jersey Nets, Charlotte Hornets and Indiana Pacers in the first three rounds of the playoffs en route to winning their sixth NBA championship, again four games to two over the Utah Jazz.

Harper played his final season with the Bulls during the lockout-shortened 1998–99 season. With the Bulls roster depleted due to the second retirement of Michael Jordan, as well as the losses of Scottie Pippen and Dennis Rodman, the Bulls floundered to a 13–37 record. Harper played 35 games, starting all of them. He finished second on the team with 11.2 ppg.

During his five seasons with the Bulls, he averaged about 25 minutes per game, averaging between 6.3 and 11.2 ppg during those seasons.

=== Los Angeles Lakers (1999–2001) ===
After being released by the Bulls prior to the 1999–2000 season, on October 13, 1999, he signed a two-year contract as a free agent with the Los Angeles Lakers and his former Bulls coach, Phil Jackson.

During the 1999–2000 season, Harper started 78 of 80 games playing much the same role as he did for the Bulls, averaging 7.0 ppg and finishing second on the Lakers in steals behind Kobe Bryant. Led by Bryant and Shaquille O'Neal, the Lakers won 67 games and secured the league's best record as they defeated the Sacramento Kings, Phoenix Suns and Portland Trail Blazers in the first three rounds of the playoffs. In the final minute of game 3 in Portland, Harper caught a pass from Bryant in the left corner and sank a 19-foot jump shot with 29.9 seconds remaining to give the Lakers a 93–91 lead. On the final play of the game, Harper helped Bryant block a shot by Arvydas Sabonis to seal the Lakers' victory. The Lakers would win the series in seven games to set up a match-up with the Indiana Pacers in the Finals. In game 2, Bryant sprained his ankle and left the game. Harper and Glen Rice picked up the slack with 21 points apiece to help the Lakers take a 2–0 lead. The Lakers would go on to win the NBA championship over the Pacers four games to two. Harper started all 23 games in the postseason and averaged 8.6 points per game, earning his fourth NBA championship ring.

The 2000–2001 season was Harper's 15th and final NBA season. Injuries limited him to 47 games (starting 46). By season's end, Derek Fisher had taken over the starting point guard slot, and Harper would only play in six games during the playoffs. The Lakers reached the Finals, where they faced the Philadelphia 76ers. Following the Sixers' win in game 1, the Lakers won games 2 and 3. In game 4, Harper made crucial shots on the way to eight points, his best point total for the series. The Lakers won games 4 and game 5 to win their second straight NBA championship. It earned Harper his fifth NBA championship ring in a six-year span.

== Career statistics ==
Legend
GP	Games played	GS	Games started	MPG	Minutes per game
FG%	Field goal percentage	3P%	3-point field goal percentage	FT%	Free throw percentage
RPG	Rebounds per game	APG	Assists per game	SPG	Steals per game
BPG	Blocks per game	PPG	Points per game	**Bold**	Career high
†	Won an NBA championship	*	Led the league

=== NBA ===
==== Regular season ====
Year	Team	GP	GS	MPG	FG%	3P%	FT%	RPG	APG	SPG	BPG	PPG
1986–87	Cleveland	**82**	**82**	37.4	.455	.213	.684	4.8	4.8	**2.5**	1.0	22.9
1987–88	Cleveland	52	52	32.1	.464	.150	.705	3.9	4.9	2.1	.9	15.4
1988–89	Cleveland	**82**	**82**	34.8	**.511**	.250	.751	5.0	5.3	2.3	.9	18.6
1989–90	Cleveland	7	7	37.4	.442	.200	.756	**6.9**	**7.0**	2.0	**1.3**	22.0
1989–90	L.A. Clippers	28	28	**39.5**	.481	.283	**.795**	5.6	4.8	2.4	1.1	**23.0**
1990–91	L.A. Clippers	39	34	35.5	.391	.324	.668	4.8	5.4	1.7	.9	19.6
1991–92	L.A. Clippers	**82**	**82**	38.3	.440	.303	.736	5.5	5.1	1.9	.9	18.2
1992–93	L.A. Clippers	80	77	37.1	.451	.280	.769	5.3	4.5	2.2	.9	18.0
1993–94	L.A. Clippers	75	75	38.1	.426	.301	.715	6.1	4.6	1.9	.7	20.1
1994–95	Chicago	77	53	19.9	.426	.282	.618	2.3	2.0	1.3	.4	6.9
1995–96†	Chicago	80	80	23.6	.467	.269	.705	2.7	2.6	1.3	.4	7.4
1996–97†	Chicago	76	74	22.9	.436	**.362**	.707	2.5	2.5	1.1	.5	6.3
1997–98†	Chicago	**82***	**82***	27.9	.441	.190	.750	3.5	2.9	1.3	.6	9.3
1998–99	Chicago	35	35	31.6	.377	.318	.703	5.1	3.3	1.7	1.0	11.2
1999–00†	L.A. Lakers	80	78	25.5	.399	.311	.680	4.2	3.4	1.1	.5	7.0
2000–01†	L.A. Lakers	47	46	24.2	.469	.264	.708	3.5	2.4	.5	.5	6.5
Career		1009	967	30.9	.446	.289	.720	4.3	3.9	1.7	.7	13.8

==== Playoffs ====
Year	Team	GP	GS	MPG	FG%	3P%	FT%	RPG	APG	SPG	BPG	PPG
1988	Cleveland	4	4	33.5	.476	.000	.688	5.0	3.8	2.8	1.0	17.8
1989	Cleveland	5	5	37.8	**.565**	.000	.769	4.2	4.0	2.2	.8	**19.6**
1992	L.A. Clippers	5	5	**41.2**	.448	.111	**.786**	**6.4**	**4.6**	1.0	.8	18.0
1993	L.A. Clippers	5	5	34.8	.474	**.500**	.647	4.0	3.2	**3.0**	**2.0**	18.0
1995	Chicago	6	0	6.7	.429	.000	.000	1.0	.7	.5	.2	2.0
1996†	Chicago	18	16	27.4	.425	.319	.690	3.7	2.5	1.4	.4	8.8
1997†	Chicago	19	19	27.1	.400	.344	.750	4.3	3.0	1.3	.7	7.5
1998†	Chicago	21	21	26.8	.459	.263	.615	3.7	2.3	1.0	.9	6.7
2000†	L.A. Lakers	**23**	**23**	28.0	.431	.231	.702	3.7	3.2	1.0	.6	8.6
2001†	L.A. Lakers	6	0	7.0	.500	.250	.667	1.3	.7	.7	.2	2.2
Career		112	98	26.8	.450	.292	.698	3.7	2.7	1.3	.7	9.0

=== College ===
Year	Team	GP	GS	MPG	FG%	3P%	FT%	RPG	APG	SPG	BPG	PPG
1982–83	Miami (OH)	28	–	31.7	.497	–	**.674**	7.0	2.2	2.2	1.0	12.9
1983–84	Miami (OH)	30	–	33.0	.537	–	.570	7.6	2.1	1.4	1.0	16.3
1984–85	Miami (OH)	**31**	–	**36.9**	.541	–	.661	10.7	2.5	2.6	1.5	**24.9**
1985–86	Miami (OH)	**31**	–	**36.9**	**.545**	–	.665	**11.7**	**4.3**	**3.3**	**2.3**	24.4
Career		120	–	34.7	.534	–	.642	9.3	2.8	2.4	1.5	19.8

== Coaching career ==
In 2005, Harper signed as an assistant coach for the Detroit Pistons. His two-year deal was not renewed in 2007.

== Media appearances ==
On November 1, 1997, Ron Harper appeared in the Nickelodeon sitcom Kenan & Kel, in the episode titled "Foul Bull". In the episode, Harper, as a Chicago Bull, slips on some orange soda and gets injured, and all of Chicago is angry with Kenan and Kel, who try to apologize.

== Personal life ==
Harper has battled stuttering for most of his life, and donates his time to the National Stuttering Association to encourage others with this problem to not let it hinder them.

Harper is the father of NBA players Ron Jr. and Dylan Harper, both with his ex-wife Maria Pizarro, a Filipino who traces her roots to Bataan. Dylan was drafted 2nd overall in the 2025 NBA draft. He is the godfather to R. J. Hunter.

In 2026, Harper received an Honorary Doctorate degree from Miami University.

In 2026, Harper was selected for induction into the Miami University Athletic Hall of Fame. Unfortunately, he was unable to attend the ceremony due to a personal commitment.

== See also ==
- List of National Basketball Association career steals leaders
- List of National Basketball Association single-game steals leaders
- List of National Basketball Association top rookie scoring averages
- List of NCAA Division I men's basketball players with 2,000 points and 1,000 rebounds
