= 1985 MAC men's basketball tournament =

- Classification: Division I
- Season: 1984–85
- Teams: 7
- Finals site: Centennial Hall; Toledo, OH
- Champions: Ohio (2nd title)
- Winning coach: Danny Nee (2nd title)
- MVP: Ron Harper (Miami (OH))
- MAC men's basketball tournaments

1984–85 Mid-American Conference men's basketball standings
	Conf.				Overall
Team	W		L	PCT	W		L	PCT
Ohio †	14	–	4	.778	22	–	8	.733
Miami	13	–	5	.722	20	–	11	.645
Toledo	11	–	7	.611	16	–	12	.571
Kent State	11	–	7	.611	17	–	13	.567
Eastern Michigan	9	–	9	.500	15	–	13	.536
Ball State	8	–	10	.444	13	–	16	.448
Western Michigan	7	–	11	.389	12	–	16	.429
Northern Illinois	7	–	11	.389	11	–	16	.407
Bowling Green	6	–	12	.333	12	–	15	.444
Central Michigan	4	–	14	.222	9	–	18	.333
† 1985 MAC tournament winner Rankings from AP Poll

The 1985 MAC men's basketball tournament was held March 5–7 at Centennial Hall in Toledo, Ohio. Top-seeded Ohio defeated Miami in the championship game by the score of 74–64 to win their second MAC men's basketball tournament and a bid to the NCAA tournament. There they lost to Kansas in the first round. Ron Harper of runner-up Miami was named the tournament MVP.

== Format ==
Seven of the ten MAC teams participated. All games were played at Centennial Hall in Toledo, Ohio.

== Bracket ==
Quarterfinals; March 5
5	Eastern Michigan	74
4	Kent State	85
3	Toledo	66
6	Ball State	68
7	Western Michigan	64
2	Miami (OH)	78

Semifinals; March 6
1	Ohio	57
4	Kent State	55
6	Ball State	70
2	Miami (OH)	91

Final; March 7
1	Ohio	74
2	Miami (OH)	64
