= 1995–96 Chicago Bulls season =

NBA basketball team season (won championship)

- NBA champions
- Conference champions
- Division champions
- Head coach: Phil Jackson
- General manager: Jerry Krause
- Owners: Jerry Reinsdorf
- Arena: United Center

Results
- Record: 72–10 (.878)
- Place: Division: 1st (Central); Conference: 1st (Eastern)
- Playoff finish: NBA champions (Defeated SuperSonics 4–2)
- Stats at Basketball Reference

Local media
- Television: WGN-TV (Wayne Larrivee, Johnny "Red" Kerr); SportsChannel Chicago (Tom Dore, Johnny "Red" Kerr)
- Radio: WMAQ

The 1995–96 Chicago Bulls season was the 30th season for the Chicago Bulls in the National Basketball Association. The Bulls became the first NBA team to ever win 70 regular season games, finishing in first place in the Central Division with a league-best 72–10 record, and earned the first seed in the Eastern Conference; the team also posted a league-best 39–2 home record at the United Center, and qualified for the NBA playoffs for the twelfth consecutive year. They defeated the Seattle SuperSonics in the NBA Finals in six games to become the NBA Champions.

== Season summary ==
=== Off-season ===
During the off-season, the Bulls acquired controversial All-Star forward and rebound specialist Dennis Rodman from the San Antonio Spurs, and signed free agents Randy Brown, and James Edwards. At mid-season, the team signed John Salley, who was previously released by the expansion Toronto Raptors; Rodman, Edwards and Salley were all teammates on the Detroit Pistons during the "Bad Boy" era, where they won two consecutive NBA championships between 1989 and 1990.

For the season, the Bulls revealed new black alternate road uniforms, which featured red pinstripes, a red, black and white trim, and the team's primary logo on both legs of their shorts; eventually, they would remove the pinstripes from their uniforms in 1997.

=== Regular season ===
With the addition of Rodman, the Bulls won their first five games of the regular season, and later on posted a 13-game winning streak between November and December, which led to a 23–2 start to the season. The Bulls posted an 18-game winning streak between January and February, which led to a 41–3 record as of February 2, 1996; the team also went undefeated by posting a 14–0 record in January, and held a 42–5 record at the All-Star break. The Bulls became the first NBA team to ever win 70 regular season games, finishing in first place in the Central Division with a league-best 72–10 record, and earned the first seed in the Eastern Conference; the team also posted a league-best 39–2 home record at the United Center, and qualified for the NBA playoffs for the twelfth consecutive year.

The 1995–96 Bulls were named one of the Top 10 Teams in NBA History during the celebration of the league's 50th anniversary in 1996. The team set the record for most wins in an NBA regular season. The 2015–16 Golden State Warriors set a new milestone by finishing with a 73–9 regular season record, but did not win the NBA championship; despite their remarkable performance, the team ultimately fell short in the 2016 NBA Finals. Notably, the Warriors' head coach, Steve Kerr, had a significant link to the 1995–96 Bulls team, having previously played as a point guard for the Bulls during that time. The Bulls' started the regular season 37–0 at home, part of a then-NBA-record 44-game winning streak that included games from the 1994–95 regular season. Their 33 road wins were the most in NBA history until the 2015–16 Warriors won 34 road games. The season was the best 3-loss start in NBA history at 41–3 (.932). They are also the only team in NBA history to win more than 70 games and an NBA title in the same season. The Bulls had the best team offensive rating and the best team defensive rating in the NBA, and are widely regarded as one of the greatest teams in NBA history.

In his first full season with the Bulls since the 1992–93 season, Michael Jordan averaged 30.4 points, 6.6 rebounds, 4.3 assists and 2.2 steals per game, contributed 111 three-point field goals, and was named the NBA Most Valuable Player of the Year. In addition, Scottie Pippen averaged 19.4 points, 6.4 rebounds, 5.9 assists and 1.7 steals per game, and led the Bulls with 150 three-point field goals, while Croatian small forward Toni Kukoč played a sixth man role off the bench, averaging 13.1 points, 4.0 rebounds and 3.5 assists per game, and was named the NBA Sixth Man of the Year. Meanwhile, Luc Longley provided the team with 9.1 points and 5.1 rebounds per game, three-point specialist Kerr contributed 8.4 points per game and 122 three-point field goals off the bench, while shooting .515 in three-point field-goal percentage, and Ron Harper provided with 7.4 points and 1.3 steals per game. Rodman averaged 5.5 points and 14.9 rebounds per game, and Bill Wennington contributed 5.3 points and 2.5 rebounds per game.

During the NBA All-Star weekend at the Alamodome in San Antonio, Texas, Jordan and Pippen were both selected for the 1996 NBA All-Star Game, as members of the Eastern Conference All-Star team, while head coach Phil Jackson was selected to coach the Eastern Conference. Jordan scored 20 points in 22 minutes, and won his second NBA All-Star Game Most Valuable Player award, as the Eastern Conference defeated the Western Conference, 129–118. Meanwhile, Kerr participated in the NBA Three-Point Shootout for the third consecutive year. Jordan and Pippen were both named to the All-NBA First Team, and NBA All-Defensive First Team, with Rodman being selected to the latter team, and Jackson was named the NBA Coach of the Year. Pippen finished in fifth place in Most Valuable Player voting, while Rodman finished in 15th place; Pippen also finished in second place in Defensive Player of the Year voting, behind Gary Payton of the Seattle SuperSonics, while Jordan finished in sixth place, and Rodman finished in seventh place, and Kerr finished in ninth place in Sixth Man of the Year voting.

The Bulls finished second in the NBA in home-game attendance behind the Charlotte Hornets, with an attendance of 969,149 at the United Center during the regular season.

=== NBA playoffs ===
In the Eastern Conference First Round of the 1996 NBA playoffs, the Bulls faced off against the 8th–seeded Miami Heat, a team that featured All-Star center Alonzo Mourning, All-Star guard Tim Hardaway, and Rex Chapman. The Bulls won their first two home games over the Heat at the United Center, before winning Game 3 on the road, 112–91 at the Miami Arena to win the series in a three-game sweep.

In the Eastern Conference Semi-finals, the team faced off against the 5th–seeded New York Knicks, a team that featured All-Star center Patrick Ewing, Anthony Mason and John Starks. The Bulls won the first two games at the United Center, before losing Game 3 to the Knicks on the road in overtime, 102–99 at Madison Square Garden, despite a 46-point performance from Jordan. The Bulls won the next two games, which included a Game 5 win over the Knicks at the United Center, 94–81 to win the series in five games.

In the Eastern Conference Finals, and for the second consecutive year, the Bulls faced off against the 2nd–seeded, and Atlantic Division champion Orlando Magic, who were led by the trio of All-Star center Shaquille O'Neal, All-Star guard Penny Hardaway, and former Bulls forward Horace Grant. The Bulls won the first two games at the United Center to take a 2–0 series lead, and then won the next two games over the Magic on the road, including a Game 4 win at the Orlando Arena, 106–101, in which Jordan scored 45 points; the Bulls won the series over the Magic in a four-game sweep to advance to the NBA Finals.

In the 1996 NBA Finals, the Bulls faced off against the top–seeded SuperSonics, who were led by the All-Star trio of Payton, Shawn Kemp and Detlef Schrempf. The Bulls won their first two home games over the SuperSonics at the United Center, before winning Game 3 on the road, 108–86 at the KeyArena at Seattle Center to take a 3–0 series lead. However, the Bulls lost the next two games to the SuperSonics on the road. With a 3–2 series lead, the Bulls won Game 6 over the SuperSonics at the United Center, 87–75, thus winning the series in six games, and also winning their fourth NBA championship in six years; Jordan was named the NBA Finals Most Valuable Player for the fourth time, after scoring 22 points in Game 6, despite struggling as he only made 5 out of 19 field-goal attempts. The 1995–96 Bulls have the best combined regular and postseason record in NBA history at 87–13 (.870 in winning percentage).

=== Notable incidents ===
One notable incident of the regular season occurred on March 16, 1996, during a road game against the New Jersey Nets at the Brendan Byrne Arena. During the first quarter, Rodman head butted referee Ted Bernhardt, got ejected and was suspended for six games; the Bulls defeated the Nets by a score of 97–93.

=== Aftermath ===
Following the season, Edwards retired, and Salley left to play overseas in Greece.

== Off-season ==
Before the 1995–96 NBA season, the Bulls acquired Dennis Rodman and Jack Haley from the Spurs in exchange for Will Perdue and cash considerations to fill a void at power forward left by Horace Grant, who left the Bulls before the 1994–95 NBA season.

In his book Bad as I Wanna Be, Rodman wrote that Michael Jordan and Scottie Pippen had to approve the trade. Rodman chose the number 91 (9+1=10 according to Rodman for why he chose that number) for his jersey since #10 was retired by the Bulls in 1995 in honor of Bob Love.

Haley played in one game, the final game of the regular season, and didn't participate in the playoffs. He was best known for his friendship with the enigmatic Rodman.

=== NBA draft ===
Round	Pick	Player	Position	Nationality	School/Club team
1	20	Jason Caffey	PF	United States	Alabama
2	31	Dragan Tarlać	C	FR Yugoslavia	Olympiakos (Greece)

== Roster ==
1995–96 Chicago Bulls roster
Players

Pos.	No.	Player	Height	Weight	DOB	From
G	0	Randy Brown	6 ft 2 in (1.88 m)	190 lb (86 kg)	1968–05–22	New Mexico State
G	30	Jud Buechler	6 ft 6 in (1.98 m)	220 lb (100 kg)	1968–06–19	Arizona
F	35	Jason Caffey	6 ft 8 in (2.03 m)	255 lb (116 kg)	1973–06–12	Alabama
C	53	James Edwards	7 ft 0 in (2.13 m)	225 lb (102 kg)	1955–11–22	Washington
F	54	Jack Haley	6 ft 10 in (2.08 m)	240 lb (109 kg)	1964–01–27	UCLA
G	9	Ron Harper	6 ft 6 in (1.98 m)	185 lb (84 kg)	1964–01–20	Miami (OH)
G	23	Michael Jordan	6 ft 6 in (1.98 m)	215 lb (98 kg)	1963–02–17	North Carolina
G	25	Steve Kerr	6 ft 3 in (1.91 m)	180 lb (82 kg)	1965–09–27	Arizona
F	7	Toni Kukoč	6 ft 11 in (2.11 m)	220 lb (100 kg)	1968–09–18	Croatia
C	13	Luc Longley	7 ft 2 in (2.18 m)	265 lb (120 kg)	1969–01–19	New Mexico
F	33	Scottie Pippen	6 ft 7 in (2.01 m)	228 lb (103 kg)	1965–09–25	Central Arkansas
F	91	Dennis Rodman	6 ft 7 in (2.01 m)	220 lb (100 kg)	1961–05–13	SE Oklahoma State
F	22	John Salley	6 ft 11 in (2.11 m)	230 lb (104 kg)	1964–05–16	Georgia Tech
F	8	Dickey Simpkins	6 ft 9 in (2.06 m)	248 lb (112 kg)	1972–04–06	Providence
C	34	Bill Wennington	7 ft 0 in (2.13 m)	245 lb (111 kg)	1963–04–26	St. John's

Coaches
Head coach
- Phil Jackson
Assistant(s)
- Jim Cleamons
- John Paxson
- Jimmy Rodgers
- Tex Winter

Legend
- (DP) Unsigned draft pick
- (FA) Free agent
- (S) Suspended
- Injured

Roster
Updated: March 24, 1996

== Standings ==
=== Central Division ===
Central Division	W	L	PCT	GB	Home	Road	Div	GP
z–Chicago Bulls	72	10	.878	–	39‍–‍2	33‍–‍8	24–4	82
x–Indiana Pacers	52	30	.634	20.0	32‍–‍9	20‍–‍21	19–9	82
x–Cleveland Cavaliers	47	35	.573	25.0	26‍–‍15	21‍–‍20	13–15	82
x–Atlanta Hawks	46	36	.561	26.0	26‍–‍15	20‍–‍21	15–13	82
x–Detroit Pistons	46	36	.561	26.0	30‍–‍11	16‍–‍25	15–13	82
Charlotte Hornets	41	41	.500	31.0	25‍–‍16	16‍–‍25	13–15	82
Milwaukee Bucks	25	57	.305	47.0	14‍–‍27	11‍–‍30	8–20	82
Toronto Raptors	21	61	.256	51.0	15‍–‍26	6‍–‍35	5–23	82

=== Eastern Conference ===
Eastern Conference
#	Team	W	L	PCT	GB	GP
1	z–Chicago Bulls	72	10	.878	–	82
2	y–Orlando Magic	60	22	.732	12.0	82
3	x–Indiana Pacers	52	30	.634	20.0	82
4	x–Cleveland Cavaliers	47	35	.573	25.0	82
5	x–New York Knicks	47	35	.573	25.0	82
6	x–Atlanta Hawks	46	36	.561	26.0	82
7	x–Detroit Pistons	46	36	.561	26.0	82
8	x–Miami Heat	42	40	.512	30.0	82
9	Charlotte Hornets	41	41	.500	31.0	82
10	Washington Bullets	39	43	.476	33.0	82
11	Boston Celtics	33	49	.402	39.0	82
12	New Jersey Nets	30	52	.366	42.0	82
13	Milwaukee Bucks	25	57	.305	47.0	82
14	Toronto Raptors	21	61	.256	51.0	82
15	Philadelphia 76ers	18	64	.220	54.0	82

== Regular season ==
=== November ===
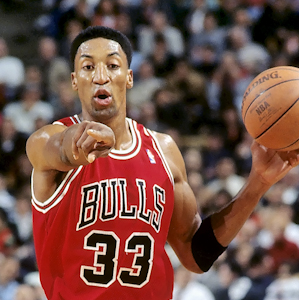
Scottie Pippen accumulated 2 triple-doubles and 4 double-doubles in November 1995.

The Bulls began the 1995–96 season on November 3 against the Charlotte Hornets and defeated them, 105–91, with Michael Jordan scoring 42 points. The next day, Chicago defeated the Boston Celtics in a 22-point blowout, 107–85, behind Scottie Pippen's 21 points, 4 rebounds and 5 assists. On November 7, the Bulls defeated the Toronto Raptors behind Jordan's 38 points. In Gund Arena, Chicago defeated the Cleveland Cavaliers on November 9, where Scottie Pippen accumulated a triple-double with 18 points, 13 rebounds, and 12 assists. After defeating the Portland Trail Blazers on November 11, the Bulls reached a 5–0 start for the season. On November 14, Chicago's undefeated streak ended with a loss to the Orlando Magic, despite a double-double performance by Pippen who recorded 17 points and 10 rebounds. Jordan also scored 23 points and grabbed 7 rebounds for the Bulls Following their first loss of the season, Chicago bounced back to defeat Cleveland on November 15. The Bulls would continue their winning ways by defeating the New Jersey Nets on November 17. Toni Kukoc recorded a game-high 19 points and 7 assists for the Bulls.

The Bulls went on a road trip to play against seven Western Conference teams. On November 21, Chicago played in its first overtime game of the season in a win against the Dallas Mavericks, 108–102, backed by a double-double performance by Pippen who recorded 26 points, 12 rebounds and 7 assists and 36 points from Jordan. On the next day, the Bulls defeated the San Antonio Spurs behind another triple-double by Pippen who recorded 15 points, 10 rebounds and 13 assists. and Jordan's 38 points and 9 rebounds. Chicago then went to Delta Center to play against the Utah Jazz on November 24. In the game, the Bulls defeated the Jazz, 90–85. On November 26, the Bulls headed to Seattle and led the Sonics 64–51 after the first half, but the Sonics mounted a comeback outscoring the Bulls on the next two quarters, thus handing the visiting Bulls their second loss of the season, 92–97. Jordan led the Bulls with 22 points and 5 rebounds. The next game, the Bulls would visit the Trailblazers. Jordan led all scorers with 33 points to go along with 8 assists, as the Bulls won, 107–104. In their last game of the month, the Bulls went to Canada to play against the Vancouver Grizzlies and defeated them, 94–88.

=== December ===
Chicago's road trip ended in Los Angeles on December 2 after defeating the Clippers behind Jordan's double-double of 37 points and 11 rebounds. On December 6, the Bulls headed back to the United Center to play the New York Knicks and had defeated them despite Jordan's struggle that night who shot just 8-for-27 from the field. In that game also, Rodman grabbed a game-high 20 rebounds. The Bulls won their fifth straight game on December 8 against the Spurs, behind Jordan's statline of 28 points, 5 rebounds and 6 assists. On the next day, Chicago defeated the Milwaukee Bucks behind Jordan's 45-point performance and Pippen's 28 points and 6 assists. On December 13, the Bulls were visited by the Orlando Magic. Jordan recorded 36 points and 6 rebounds, Pippen recorded 26 points, 8 rebounds and 6 assists and Rodman recorded 8 points and 19 rebounds as they got their 17th win of the season, beating the visiting Magic, 112–103. The next day, the Bulls traveled to Atlanta to take on the Hawks on the road. The Bulls outscored the Hawks 65 to 55 in the first half, thus fueling them towards their 8th straight win and 18th win of the season. Pippen led the Bulls having recorded a near triple-double of 30 points, 8 rebounds and 8 assists. On December 16, Pippen recorded a double-double of 33 points and 13 rebounds as the Bulls got the win over the visiting L.A. Lakers, 108–88. Two days after, Jordan and Pippen both scored 37 points as they fueled the Bulls towards their 20th win of the season, after beating the Celtics, 123–114.

=== January ===
The Bulls went undefeated in January.

=== February ===
The Bulls continued their success in February, winning 11 of 14 of the games played this month. And also, this is their first and only time they have lost back-to-back games for the whole season. On February 4, they had been defeated by the Denver Nuggets despite a stellar performance by Michael Jordan who recorded 39 points and 4 assists on the road. The following game, the Bulls also lost another road game, this time to the Phoenix Suns. In this game, Charles Barkley proved too much to be handle by the Bulls as he dropped a double-double of 35 points and 16 rebounds to guide his team in winning. After losing two straight road games, the Bulls followed it with 7 straight wins. In that 7-game streak, the Bulls defeated the Warriors, Bullets, Pistons (in OT), Timberwolves, Pacers, Cavaliers and Hawks. Their 7-game winning streak were stopped by the home team, the Miami Heat. The Heat, guided by Rex Chapman who shot 9-for-10 from 3-point range, proved too much to be handled by the visiting Bulls. With this loss, the Bulls now have lost 6 games for the whole season, and all 6 of those games are on the road.

=== March ===
The Bulls added 2 of their final 10 losses in March:

On Sunday, March 10, they were blown out 104–72 in Madison Square Garden by Ewing's Knicks – their largest margin of defeat on the season.

Two weeks later, they dropped a game at the hands of the expansion Raptors, 109–108. Damon Stoudamire posted an efficient 30-point, 11-assist effort to lead Toronto.

=== April ===
The Bulls lost two home games in the final month losing to the Charlotte Hornets, then their final home game of the season to the Indiana Pacers. Those were their only home losses of the entire season, including the playoffs, as Chicago finished with an overall 39–2 record at the United Center.

== Playoffs ==
=== First round ===
Net.	Game	Date	Time
TBS	Game 1	April 26	9:30 EDT
NBC	Game 2	April 28	5:30 EDT
TNT	Game 3	May 1	8:00 EDT

The Bulls' playoff run began on April 26. Their First Round opponent was the Miami Heat, whom they defeated 3–1 in the regular season. In Game 1, the Bulls defeated Miami in a blowout victory behind Jordan's 35 points. Winning in a 31-point blowout, Chicago once again defeated the Heat. To reach the Conference Semifinals, the Bulls defeated the Heat in Miami in a game where Pippen accumulated a triple-double with 22 points, 18 rebounds, and 10 assists.

=== Conference semifinals ===
Net.	Game	Date	Time
NBC	Game 1	May 5	5:30 EDT
TNT	Game 2	May 7	9:30 EDT
NBC	Game 3	May 11	1:00 EDT
NBC	Game 4	May 12	5:30 EDT
TNT	Game 5	May 14	8:00 EDT

The Bulls met rival New York Knicks in the Conference Semifinals. In the regular season, Chicago won the season series, 4–1. In Game 1 on May 5, the Bulls defeated the Knicks behind Jordan's 44 points. Chicago would defeat New York again on May 7 to take a 2–0 series lead. Playing at Madison Square Garden, the Bulls lost Game 3 in overtime, despite a 46-point offensive performance by Jordan. In Game 4, Chicago defeated the Knicks by three points to take a 3–1 series lead. To close out the series, the Bulls defeated New York at home behind double-double performances by Pippen and Rodman.

=== Conference finals ===
Net.	Game	Date	Time
NBC	Game 1	May 19	3:30 EDT
TNT	Game 2	May 21	8:30 EDT
NBC	Game 3	May 25	3:30 EDT
NBC	Game 4	May 27	3:30 EDT

In the Conference Finals, the Bulls met the Atlantic Division champions, Orlando Magic, a team led by Shaquille O'Neal and Penny Hardaway, who had reached the finals the previous year and were swept by Hakeem Olajuwon and the Houston Rockets. The Bulls won the regular-season series against the Magic, 3–1. To start the series, the Bulls took Game 1 in a 38-point blowout on May 19. Behind Jordan's 35 points, Chicago defeated Orlando on May 21. In Game 3, the Bulls continued their winning ways by taking a 3–0 series lead against the Magic. Completing the series sweep, the Bulls won Game 4 by five points behind a 45-point performance by Jordan.

=== NBA Finals ===
Net.	Game	Date	Time
NBC	Game 1	June 5	9:00 EDT
NBC	Game 2	June 7	9:00 EDT
NBC	Game 3	June 9	7:30 EDT
NBC	Game 4	June 12	9:00 EDT
NBC	Game 5	June 14	9:00 EDT
NBC	Game 6	June 16	7:30 EDT

Chicago took on the Seattle SuperSonics, whose 64–18 franchise-best regular season record was overshadowed by the Bulls' 72–10 record. In the regular season, the two teams split the season series, 1–1. In Game 1 of the NBA Finals, Chicago defeated Seattle by 17 points. The Bulls took a 2–0 series lead against the Sonics in the second game where Rodman accumulated 20 rebounds. In KeyArena, Chicago won Game 3 behind Jordan's 36 points. The Bulls lost Game 4 in a 21-point blowout on June 12. On June 14, the Bulls lost against Seattle in Game 5. Back in the United Center, Chicago defeated Seattle in Game 6 to win the NBA championship four games to two.

== Game log ==
=== Regular season ===
1995–96 game log
Total: 72–10 (Home: 39–2; Road: 33–8)
November: 12–2 (home: 6–0; road: 6–2)

Game	Date	Team	Score	High points	High rebounds	High assists	Location Attendance	Record
1	November 3	Charlotte	W 105–91	Michael Jordan (42)	Dennis Rodman (11)	Michael Jordan (7)	United Center; 23,862	1–0
2	November 4	Boston	W 107–85	Scottie Pippen (21)	Longley & Rodman (8)	Kukoč & Pippen (5)	United Center; 23,608	2–0
3	November 7	Toronto	W 117–108	Michael Jordan (38)	Dennis Rodman (13)	Scottie Pippen (8)	United Center; 23,102	3–0
4	November 9	@ Cleveland	W 106–88	Michael Jordan (29)	Scottie Pippen (13)	Scottie Pippen (12)	Gund Arena; 20,562	4–0
5	November 11	Portland	W 110–106	Michael Jordan (36)	Scottie Pippen (9)	Michael Jordan (7)	United Center; 23,384	5–0
6	November 14	@ Orlando	L 88–94	Michael Jordan (23)	Scottie Pippen (10)	Jordan & Pippen (6)	Orlando Arena; 17,248	5–1
7	November 15	Cleveland	W 113–94	Scottie Pippen (27)	Jason Caffey (8)	Scottie Pippen (8)	United Center; 23,257	6–1
8	November 17	New Jersey	W 109–94	Toni Kukoč (19)	Luc Longley (8)	Toni Kukoč (7)	United Center; 23,312	7–1
9	November 21	@ Dallas	W 108–102 (OT)	Michael Jordan (36)	Scottie Pippen (12)	Scottie Pippen (7)	Reunion Arena; 17,502	8–1
10	November 22	@ San Antonio	W 103–94	Michael Jordan (38)	Luc Longley (11)	Scottie Pippen (13)	Alamodome; 35,888	9–1
11	November 24	@ Utah	W 90–85	Michael Jordan (34)	Luc Longley (10)	Michael Jordan (6)	Delta Center; 19,911	10–1
12	November 26	@ Seattle	L 92–97	Michael Jordan (22)	Scottie Pippen (12)	Scottie Pippen (5)	KeyArena; 17,072	10–2
13	November 27	@ Portland	W 107–104	Michael Jordan (33)	Pippen & Wennington (5)	Scottie Pippen (10)	Rose Garden; 21,401	11–2
14	November 30	@ Vancouver	W 94–88	Michael Jordan (29)	Luc Longley (10)	Scottie Pippen (8)	General Motors Place; 19,193	12–2

December: 13–1 (home: 9–0; road: 4–1)

Game	Date	Team	Score	High points	High rebounds	High assists	Location Attendance	Record
15	December 2	@ L.A. Clippers	W 104–98	Michael Jordan (37)	Scottie Pippen (13)	Scottie Pippen (6)	Arrowhead Pond; 18,321	13–2
16	December 6	New York	W 101–94	Jordan & Pippen (22)	Dennis Rodman (20)	Jordan & Pippen (8)	United Center; 23,828	14–2
17	December 8	San Antonio	W 106–87	Michael Jordan (28)	Dennis Rodman (21)	Michael Jordan (6)	United Center; 23,802	15–2
18	December 9	@ Milwaukee	W 118–106	Michael Jordan (45)	Dennis Rodman (21)	Scottie Pippen (6)	Bradley Center; 18,633	16–2
19	December 13	Orlando	W 112–103	Michael Jordan (36)	Dennis Rodman (19)	Scottie Pippen (6)	United Center; 23,895	17–2
20	December 14	@ Atlanta	W 127–108	Scottie Pippen (30)	Dennis Rodman (10)	Kukoč & Pippen (8)	Omni Coliseum; 16,378	18–2
21	December 16	L.A. Lakers	W 108–88	Scottie Pippen (33)	Dennis Rodman (15)	Jordan & Pippen (6)	United Center; 23,824	19–2
22	December 18	@ Boston	W 123–114	Jordan & Pippen (37)	Dennis Rodman (17)	Scottie Pippen (12)	FleetCenter; 18,624	20–2
23	December 19	Dallas	W 114–101	Michael Jordan (32)	Dennis Rodman (13)	Steve Kerr (6)	United Center; 23,208	21–2
24	December 22	Toronto	W 113–104	Michael Jordan (27)	Michael Jordan (10)	Michael Jordan (5)	United Center; 22,987	22–2
25	December 23	Utah	W 100–86	Michael Jordan (30)	Dennis Rodman (12)	Michael Jordan (8)	United Center; 23,906	23–2
26	December 26	@ Indiana	L 97–103	Michael Jordan (30)	Dennis Rodman (11)	Scottie Pippen (6)	Market Square Arena; 16,728	23–3
27	December 29	Indiana	W 120–93	Michael Jordan (29)	Dennis Rodman (16)	Scottie Pippen (8)	United Center; 23,739	24–3
28	December 30	Atlanta	W 95–93	Michael Jordan (33)	Dennis Rodman (21)	Michael Jordan (6)	United Center; 23,587	25–3

January: 14–0 (home: 7–0; road: 7–0)

Game	Date	Team	Score	High points	High rebounds	High assists	Location Attendance	Record
29	January 3	Houston	W 100–86	Michael Jordan (38)	Dennis Rodman (15)	Scottie Pippen (9)	United Center; 23,854	26–3
30	January 4	@ Charlotte	W 117–93	Michael Jordan (27)	Dennis Rodman (11)	Ron Harper (7)	Charlotte Coliseum; 24,042	27–3
31	January 6	Milwaukee	W 113–84	Michael Jordan (32)	Dennis Rodman (16)	Scottie Pippen (6)	United Center; 23,801	28–3
32	January 10	Seattle	W 113–87	Michael Jordan (35)	Michael Jordan (14)	3 players tied (5)	United Center; 23,877	29–3
33	January 13	@ Philadelphia	W 120–93	Michael Jordan (48)	Dennis Rodman (16)	Scottie Pippen (10)	CoreStates Spectrum; 18,168	30–3
34	January 15	@ Washington	W 116–109	Michael Jordan (46)	Dennis Rodman (15)	Scottie Pippen (6)	USAir Arena; 18,756	31–3
35	January 16	Philadelphia	W 116–104	Michael Jordan (32)	Dennis Rodman (21)	Dennis Rodman (10)	United Center; 23,587	32–3
36	January 18	@ Toronto	W 92–89	Michael Jordan (38)	Dennis Rodman (13)	Pippen & Rodman (4)	SkyDome; 36,118	33–3
37	January 21	@ Detroit	W 111–96	Michael Jordan (36)	Dennis Rodman (9)	Scottie Pippen (6)	The Palace of Auburn Hills; 21,454	34–3
38	January 23	@ New York	W 99–79	Michael Jordan (33)	Dennis Rodman (13)	Scottie Pippen (6)	Madison Square Garden; 19,763	35–3
39	January 24	Vancouver	W 104–84	Scottie Pippen (30)	Dennis Rodman (16)	Ron Harper (7)	United Center; 23,652	36–3
40	January 26	Miami	W 102–80	Michael Jordan (25)	Dennis Rodman (16)	Pippen & Rodman (5)	United Center; 23,814	37–3
41	January 28	Phoenix	W 93–82	Michael Jordan (31)	Dennis Rodman (20)	Michael Jordan (6)	United Center; 23,927	38–3
42	January 30	@ Houston	W 98–87	Scottie Pippen (28)	Scottie Pippen (12)	Scottie Pippen (5)	The Summit; 16,286	39–3

February: 11–3 (home: 4–0; road: 7–3)

Game	Date	Team	Score	High points	High rebounds	High assists	Location Attendance	Record
43	February 1	@ Sacramento	W 105–85	Michael Jordan (27)	Dennis Rodman (21)	Toni Kukoč (5)	ARCO Arena; 17,317	40–3
44	February 2	@ L.A. Lakers	W 99–84	Scottie Pippen (30)	Dennis Rodman (23)	Michael Jordan (7)	Great Western Forum; 17,505	41–3
45	February 4	@ Denver	L 99–105	Michael Jordan (39)	Dennis Rodman (12)	3 players tied (5)	McNichols Sports Arena; 17,171	41–4
46	February 6	@ Phoenix	L 96–106	Michael Jordan (28)	Dennis Rodman (14)	Scottie Pippen (8)	America West Arena; 19,023	41–5
47	February 7	@ Golden State	W 99–95	Michael Jordan (40)	Dennis Rodman (18)	Michael Jordan (6)	Oakland Coliseum Arena; 15,025	42–5
All-Star Break
48	February 13	Washington	W 111–98	Michael Jordan (32)	Dennis Rodman (16)	Scottie Pippen (4)	United Center; 23,494	43–5
49	February 15	@ Detroit	W 112–109 (OT)	Michael Jordan (32)	Dennis Rodman (19)	Scottie Pippen (6)	The Palace of Auburn Hills; 21,454	44–5
50	February 16	@ Minnesota	W 103–100	Michael Jordan (35)	Dennis Rodman (19)	Scottie Pippen (7)	Target Center; 20,214	45–5
51	February 18	@ Indiana	W 110–102	Michael Jordan (44)	Dennis Rodman (23)	Michael Jordan (7)	Market Square Arena; 16,770	46–5
52	February 20	Cleveland	W 102–76	Ron Harper (22)	Dennis Rodman (15)	Scottie Pippen (8)	United Center; 23,604	47–5
53	February 22	@ Atlanta	W 96–91	Michael Jordan (34)	Dennis Rodman (20)	Scottie Pippen (10)	Omni Coliseum; 16,378	48–5
54	February 23	@ Miami	L 104–113	Michael Jordan (31)	Dennis Rodman (11)	Scottie Pippen (6)	Miami Arena; 15,200	48–6
55	February 25	Orlando	W 111–91	Toni Kukoč (24)	Dennis Rodman (17)	Michael Jordan (7)	United Center; 24,102	49–6
56	February 27	Minnesota	W 120–99	Michael Jordan (35)	Dennis Rodman (24)	Michael Jordan (7)	United Center; 23,716	50–6

March: 12–2 (home: 10–0; road: 2–2)

Game	Date	Team	Score	High points	High rebounds	High assists	Location Attendance	Record
57	March 1	Golden State	W 110–87	Scottie Pippen (25)	Dennis Rodman (17)	Michael Jordan (6)	United Center; 23,596	51–6
58	March 2	Boston	W 107–75	Michael Jordan (21)	Dennis Rodman (15)	Michael Jordan (8)	United Center; 23,721	52–6
59	March 5	Milwaukee	W 115–106	Michael Jordan (33)	Dennis Rodman (9)	Harper & Kukoč (7)	United Center; 23,547	53–6
60	March 7	Detroit	W 102–81	Michael Jordan (53)	Dennis Rodman (13)	Scottie Pippen (10)	United Center; 23,369	54–6
61	March 10	@ New York	L 72–104	Michael Jordan (32)	Dennis Rodman (10)	Scottie Pippen (5)	Madison Square Garden; 19,763	54–7
62	March 13	Washington	W 103–86	Michael Jordan (37)	Dennis Rodman (14)	Michael Jordan (5)	United Center; 23,652	55–7
63	March 15	Denver	W 108–87	Michael Jordan (33)	Dennis Rodman (15)	Toni Kukoč (10)	United Center; 23,692	56–7
64	March 16	@ New Jersey	W 97–93	Michael Jordan (37)	Michael Jordan (16)	Michael Jordan (5)	Continental Airlines Arena; 20,049	57–7
65	March 18	@ Philadelphia	W 98–94	Michael Jordan (38)	Michael Jordan (11)	Toni Kukoč (11)	CoreStates Spectrum; 18,168	58–7
66	March 19	Sacramento	W 89–67	Michael Jordan (20)	Michael Jordan (9)	Toni Kukoč (7)	United Center; 23,312	59–7
67	March 21	New York	W 107–86	Michael Jordan (36)	Michael Jordan (11)	Jordan & Kukoč (5)	United Center; 23,802	60–7
68	March 24	@ Toronto	L 108–109	Michael Jordan (36)	3 player tied (9)	Scottie Pippen (6)	SkyDome; 36,131	60–8
69	March 28	Atlanta	W 111–80	Toni Kukoč (24)	Scottie Pippen (11)	Scottie Pippen (8)	United Center; 23,642	61–8
70	March 30	L.A. Clippers	W 106–85	Scottie Pippen (22)	Jordan & Kukoč (9)	Michael Jordan (6)	United Center; 23,764	62–8

April: 10–2 (home: 3–2; road: 7–0)

Game	Date	Team	Score	High points	High rebounds	High assists	Location Attendance	Record
71	April 2	@ Miami	W 110–92	Jordan & Pippen (32)	Dennis Rodman (13)	Ron Harper (6)	Miami Arena; 15,200	63–8
72	April 4	Miami	W 100–92	Michael Jordan (40)	Dennis Rodman (12)	Scottie Pippen (8)	United Center; 23,702	64–8
73	April 5	@ Charlotte	W 126–92	Scottie Pippen (28)	Dennis Rodman (17)	Scottie Pippen (14)	Charlotte Coliseum; 24,042	65–8
74	April 7	@ Orlando	W 90–86	Michael Jordan (27)	Pippen & Rodman (13)	Scottie Pippen (5)	Orlando Arena; 17,248	66–8
75	April 8	Charlotte	L 97–98	Michael Jordan (40)	Dennis Rodman (17)	Scottie Pippen (6)	United Center; 23,590	66–9
76	April 11	@ New Jersey	W 113–100	Michael Jordan (17)	Dennis Rodman (12)	Toni Kukoč (6)	Continental Airlines Arena; 20,049	67–9
77	April 12	Philadelphia	W 112–82	Michael Jordan (23)	Dennis Rodman (16)	Scottie Pippen (6)	United Center; 23,633	68–9
78	April 14	@ Cleveland	W 98–72	Michael Jordan (32)	Michael Jordan (12)	Toni Kukoč (5)	Gund Arena; 20,562	69–9
79	April 16	@ Milwaukee	W 86–80	Michael Jordan (22)	Dennis Rodman (19)	3 players tied (4)	Bradley Center; 18,633	70–9
80	April 18	Detroit	W 110–79	Michael Jordan (30)	Dennis Rodman (18)	Scottie Pippen (8)	United Center; 23,614	71–9
81	April 20	Indiana	L 99–100	Michael Jordan (24)	Dennis Rodman (15)	Brown & Jordan (6)	United Center; 23,784	71–10
82	April 21	@ Washington	W 103–93	Michael Jordan (26)	Dennis Rodman (11)	Scottie Pippen (5)	USAir Arena; 18,756	72–10

1995–96 schedule

=== Playoffs ===
1996 playoff game log
Total: 15–3 (Home: 10–0; Road: 5–3)
First Round: 3–0 (home: 2–0; road: 1–0)

Game	Date	Team	Score	High points	High rebounds	High assists	Location Attendance	Series
1	April 26	Miami	W 102–85	Michael Jordan (35)	Dennis Rodman (10)	3 players tied (3)	United Center; 24,104	1–0
2	April 28	Miami	W 106–75	Michael Jordan (29)	Scottie Pippen (8)	Scottie Pippen (8)	United Center; 24,202	2–0
3	May 1	@ Miami	W 112–91	Michael Jordan (26)	Scottie Pippen (18)	Scottie Pippen (10)	Miami Arena; 15,200	3–0

Conference Semifinals: 4–1 (home: 3–0; road: 1–1)

Game	Date	Team	Score	High points	High rebounds	High assists	Location Attendance	Series
1	May 5	New York	W 91–84	Michael Jordan (44)	Dennis Rodman (12)	Scottie Pippen (7)	United Center; 24,394	1–0
2	May 7	New York	W 91–80	Michael Jordan (28)	Dennis Rodman (19)	Scottie Pippen (6)	United Center; 24,328	2–0
3	May 11	@ New York	L 99–102 (OT)	Michael Jordan (46)	Dennis Rodman (16)	Scottie Pippen (6)	Madison Square Garden; 19,763	2–1
4	May 12	@ New York	W 94–91	Michael Jordan (27)	Dennis Rodman (19)	Michael Jordan (8)	Madison Square Garden; 19,763	3–1
5	May 14	New York	W 94–81	Michael Jordan (35)	Dennis Rodman (12)	Harper & Jordan (5)	United Center; 24,396	4–1

Conference Finals: 4–0 (home: 2–0; road: 2–0)

Game	Date	Team	Score	High points	High rebounds	High assists	Location Attendance	Series
1	May 19	Orlando	W 121–83	Michael Jordan (21)	Dennis Rodman (21)	Toni Kukoč (10)	United Center; 24,411	1–0
2	May 21	Orlando	W 93–88	Michael Jordan (35)	Dennis Rodman (12)	Scottie Pippen (9)	United Center; 24,395	2–0
3	May 25	@ Orlando	W 86–67	Michael Jordan (35)	Dennis Rodman (12)	Scottie Pippen (9)	Orlando Arena; 17,248	3–0
4	May 27	@ Orlando	W 106–101	Michael Jordan (45)	Dennis Rodman (14)	Scottie Pippen (8)	Orlando Arena; 17,248	4–0

NBA Finals: 4–2 (home: 3–0; road: 1–2)

Game	Date	Team	Score	High points	High rebounds	High assists	Location Attendance	Series
1	June 5	Seattle	W 107–90	Michael Jordan (28)	Dennis Rodman (13)	Ron Harper (7)	United Center; 24,544	1–0
2	June 7	Seattle	W 92–88	Michael Jordan (29)	Dennis Rodman (20)	Michael Jordan (8)	United Center; 24,544	2–0
3	June 9	@ Seattle	W 108–86	Michael Jordan (36)	Dennis Rodman (10)	Scottie Pippen (9)	KeyArena; 17,072	3–0
4	June 12	@ Seattle	L 86–107	Michael Jordan (23)	Dennis Rodman (14)	Scottie Pippen (8)	KeyArena; 17,072	3–1
5	June 14	@ Seattle	L 78–89	Michael Jordan (26)	Dennis Rodman (12)	Scottie Pippen (5)	KeyArena; 17,072	3–2
6	June 16	Seattle	W 87–75	Michael Jordan (22)	Dennis Rodman (19)	Michael Jordan (7)	United Center; 24,544	4–2

1996 schedule

== Player statistics ==
Legend
GP	Games played	GS	Games started	MPG	Minutes per game
FG%	Field-goal percentage	3P%	3-point field-goal percentage	FT%	Free-throw percentage
RPG	Rebounds per game	APG	Assists per game	SPG	Steals per game
BPG	Blocks per game	PPG	Points per game

=== Regular season ===
Player	GP	GS	MPG	FG%	3P%	FT%	RPG	APG	SPG	BPG	PPG
Randy Brown	68	0	9.9	.406	.091	.609	1.0	1.1	.84	.18	2.7
Jud Buechler	74	0	10.0	.463	.444	.636	1.5	.8	.46	.09	3.8
Jason Caffey	57	0	9.6	.438	.000	.588	1.9	.4	.21	.12	3.2
James Edwards	28	0	9.8	.373	.000	.615	1.4	.4	.04	.29	3.5
Jack Haley	1	0	7.0	.333	.000	.500	2.0	.0	.00	.00	5.0
Ron Harper	80	80	23.6	.467	.269	.705	2.7	2.6	1.31	.40	7.4
Michael Jordan	82	82	37.7	.495	.427	.834	6.6	4.3	2.20	.51	30.4
Steve Kerr	82	0	23.4	.506	.515	.929	1.3	2.3	.77	.02	8.4
Toni Kukoč	81	20	26.0	.490	.403	.772	4.0	3.5	.79	.35	13.1
Luc Longley	62	62	26.5	.482	.000	.777	5.1	1.9	.35	1.35	9.1
Scottie Pippen	77	77	36.7	.463	.374	.679	6.4	5.9	1.73	.74	19.4
Dennis Rodman	64	57	32.6	.480	.111	.528	14.9	2.5	.56	.42	5.5
John Salley	17	0	11.2	.343	.000	.600	2.5	.9	.47	.88	2.1
Dickey Simpkins	60	12	11.4	.481	1.000	.629	2.6	.6	.15	.13	3.6
Bill Wennington	71	20	15.0	.493	1.000	.860	2.5	.6	.30	.23	5.3

=== Playoffs ===
Player	GP	GS	MPG	FG%	3P%	FT%	RPG	APG	SPG	BPG	PPG
Randy Brown	16		7.0	.571	.500	.750	.6	.4	.31	.06	2.8
Jud Buechler	17		7.5	.474	.381	.500	.6	.4	.41	.00	2.7
James Edwards	6		4.7	.444	.000	.750	.7	.0	.00	.00	1.8
Ron Harper	18		27.4	.425	.319	.690	3.7	2.5	1.39	.39	8.8
Michael Jordan	18		40.7	.459	.403	.818	4.9	4.1	1.83	.33	30.7
Steve Kerr	18		19.8	.448	.321	.871	1.0	1.7	.78	.00	6.8
Toni Kukoč	15		29.3	.391	.191	.838	4.2	3.9	.93	.27	10.8
Luc Longley	18		24.4	.469	.000	.757	4.6	1.6	.39	1.39	8.3
Scottie Pippen	18		41.2	.390	.286	.638	8.5	5.9	2.61	.89	16.9
Dennis Rodman	18		34.4	.485	.000	.593	13.7	2.1	.78	.44	7.5
John Salley	16		5.3	.545	.000	.286	.7	.4	.06	.12	.9
Bill Wennington	18		9.4	.520	.000	.500	1.7	.5	.22	.06	3.0

Player statistics citation:

== Playoff leaders ==
Rate statistic requirements

Minutes played: 1 / Gary Payton* ▪ SEA / 911; 2 / Detlef Schrempf ▪ SEA / 789; 3 / Scottie Pippen* ▪ CHI / 742; 4 / Michael Jordan* ▪ CHI / 733; 5 / Karl Malone* ▪ UTA / 725	Field goals: 1 / Karl Malone* ▪ UTA / 188; 2 / Michael Jordan* ▪ CHI / 187; 3 / Gary Payton* ▪ SEA / 162; 4 / Shawn Kemp ▪ SEA / 147; 5 / Shaquille O'Neal* ▪ ORL / 131	Field goal attempts: 1 / Michael Jordan* ▪ CHI / 407; 2 / Karl Malone* ▪ UTA / 401; 3 / Gary Payton* ▪ SEA / 334; 4 / Scottie Pippen* ▪ CHI / 287; 5 / Detlef Schrempf ▪ SEA / 259	2-Pt field goals: 1 / Karl Malone* ▪ UTA / 188; 2 / Michael Jordan* ▪ CHI / 162; 3 / Shawn Kemp ▪ SEA / 147; 4 / Shaquille O'Neal* ▪ ORL / 131; 5 / Gary Payton* ▪ SEA / 121
2-Pt field goal attempts: 1 / Karl Malone* ▪ UTA / 398; 2 / Michael Jordan* ▪ CHI / 345; 3 / Shawn Kemp ▪ SEA / 255; 4 / Gary Payton* ▪ SEA / 234; 5 / Shaquille O'Neal* ▪ ORL / 216	3-Pt field goals: 1 / Gary Payton* ▪ SEA / 41; 2 / Jeff Hornacek ▪ UTA / 34; 3 / Mookie Blaylock ▪ ATL / 33; 4 / Sam Perkins ▪ SEA / 32; 5 / Scottie Pippen* ▪ CHI / 30	3-Pt field goal attempts: 1 / Scottie Pippen* ▪ CHI / 105; 2 / Gary Payton* ▪ SEA / 100; 3 / Sam Perkins ▪ SEA / 87; 4 / Mookie Blaylock ▪ ATL / 84; 5 / Dennis Scott ▪ ORL / 69	Field goals missed: 1 / Michael Jordan* ▪ CHI / 220; 2 / Karl Malone* ▪ UTA / 213; 3 / Scottie Pippen* ▪ CHI / 175; 4 / Gary Payton* ▪ SEA / 172; 5 / Detlef Schrempf ▪ SEA / 136
Free throws: 1 / Michael Jordan* ▪ CHI / 153; 2 / Shawn Kemp ▪ SEA / 124; 3 / Karl Malone* ▪ UTA / 101; 4 / Hersey Hawkins ▪ SEA / 85; 5 / Jeff Hornacek ▪ UTA / 73	Free throw attempts: 1 / Michael Jordan* ▪ CHI / 187; 2 / Karl Malone* ▪ UTA / 176; 3 / Shawn Kemp ▪ SEA / 156; 4 / Shaquille O'Neal* ▪ ORL / 122; 5 / Gary Payton* ▪ SEA / 109	Offensive rebounds: 1 / Dennis Rodman* ▪ CHI / 98; 2 / Shawn Kemp ▪ SEA / 66; 3 / Scottie Pippen* ▪ CHI / 62; 4 / Shaquille O'Neal* ▪ ORL / 49; 5 / Karl Malone* ▪ UTA / 47	Defensive rebounds: 1 / Dennis Rodman* ▪ CHI / 149; 2 / Shawn Kemp ▪ SEA / 142; 3 / Karl Malone* ▪ UTA / 139; 4 / Scottie Pippen* ▪ CHI / 91; 5 / Gary Payton* ▪ SEA / 89
Total rebounds: 1 / Dennis Rodman* ▪ CHI / 247; 2 / Shawn Kemp ▪ SEA / 208; 3 / Karl Malone* ▪ UTA / 186; 4 / Scottie Pippen* ▪ CHI / 153; 5 / Shaquille O'Neal* ▪ ORL / 120	Assists: 1 / John Stockton* ▪ UTA / 195; 2 / Gary Payton* ▪ SEA / 143; 3 / Scottie Pippen* ▪ CHI / 107; 4 / Avery Johnson ▪ SAS / 94; 5 / Karl Malone* ▪ UTA / 79	Steals: 1 / Scottie Pippen* ▪ CHI / 47; 2 / Gary Payton* ▪ SEA / 37; 3 / Karl Malone* ▪ UTA / 34; 4 / Michael Jordan* ▪ CHI / 33; 5 / John Stockton* ▪ UTA / 29	Blocks: 1 / Shawn Kemp ▪ SEA / 40; 2 / David Robinson* ▪ SAS / 25; 3 / Patrick Ewing* ▪ NYK / 25; 4 / Luc Longley ▪ CHI / 25; 5 / Felton Spencer ▪ UTA / 22
Turnovers: 1 / Shawn Kemp ▪ SEA / 80; 2 / Detlef Schrempf ▪ SEA / 67; 3 / Gary Payton* ▪ SEA / 62; 4 / John Stockton* ▪ UTA / 58; 5 / Karl Malone* ▪ UTA / 45	Personal fouls: 1 / Shawn Kemp ▪ SEA / 84; 2 / Luc Longley ▪ CHI / 83; 3 / Dennis Rodman* ▪ CHI / 76; 4 / Gary Payton* ▪ SEA / 69; 5 / Antoine Carr ▪ UTA / 66	Points: 1 / Michael Jordan* ▪ CHI / 552; 2 / Karl Malone* ▪ UTA / 477; 3 / Gary Payton* ▪ SEA / 434; 4 / Shawn Kemp ▪ SEA / 418; 5 / Detlef Schrempf ▪ SEA / 336	Field goal pct: 1 / Will Perdue ▪ SAS / .691; 2 / Adam Keefe ▪ UTA / .676; 3 / Horace Grant ▪ ORL / .649; 4 / Shaquille O'Neal* ▪ ORL / .607; 5 / Mark Bryant ▪ HOU / .600
2-pt field goal pct: 1 / Will Perdue ▪ SAS / .691; 2 / Adam Keefe ▪ UTA / .688; 3 / Horace Grant ▪ ORL / .649; 4 / Steve Kerr ▪ CHI / .647; 5 / Shaquille O'Neal* ▪ ORL / .607	3-pt field goal pct: 1 / Dontonio Wingfield ▪ POR / .600; 2 / Vinny Del Negro ▪ SAS / .593; 3 / Jeff Hornacek ▪ UTA / .586; 4 / Arvydas Sabonis* ▪ POR / .556; 5 / Chuck Person ▪ SAS / .532	Free throw pct: 1 / Kenny Smith ▪ HOU / 1.000; 2 / Cedric Ceballos ▪ LAL / .917; 3 / Mario Elie ▪ HOU / .917; 4 / Allan Houston ▪ DET / .900; 5 / Hersey Hawkins ▪ SEA / .895	Minutes per game: 1 / Wesley Person ▪ PHO / 45.8; 2 / Anthony Mason ▪ NYK / 43.8; 3 / Gary Payton* ▪ SEA / 43.4; 4 / Mookie Blaylock ▪ ATL / 42.6; 5 / Steve Smith ▪ ATL / 42.1
Points per game: 1 / Michael Jordan* ▪ CHI / 30.7; 2 / Karl Malone* ▪ UTA / 26.5; 3 / Shaquille O'Neal* ▪ ORL / 25.8; 4 / Charles Barkley* ▪ PHO / 25.5; 5 / David Robinson* ▪ SAS / 23.6; 5 / Arvydas Sabonis* ▪ POR / 23.6	Rebounds per game: 1 / Dennis Rodman* ▪ CHI / 13.7; 2 / Charles Barkley* ▪ PHO / 13.5; 3 / Dale Davis ▪ IND / 11.2; 4 / Patrick Ewing* ▪ NYK / 10.6; 5 / Horace Grant ▪ ORL / 10.4	Assists per game: 1 / John Stockton* ▪ UTA / 10.8; 2 / Kevin Johnson ▪ PHO / 10.8; 3 / Avery Johnson ▪ SAS / 9.4; 4 / Rod Strickland ▪ POR / 8.4; 5 / Gary Payton* ▪ SEA / 6.8	Steals per game: 1 / Clyde Drexler* ▪ HOU / 2.6; 2 / Robert Horry ▪ HOU / 2.6; 3 / Scottie Pippen* ▪ CHI / 2.6; 4 / Sarunas Marciulionis* ▪ SAC / 2.5; 5 / Mookie Blaylock ▪ ATL / 2.2
Blocks per game: 1 / Patrick Ewing* ▪ NYK / 3.1; 2 / David Robinson* ▪ SAS / 2.5; 3 / Hakeem Olajuwon* ▪ HOU / 2.1; 4 / Shawn Kemp ▪ SEA / 2.0; 5 / Robert Horry ▪ HOU / 1.6	Player efficiency rating: 1 / David Robinson* ▪ SAS / 29.1; 2 / Charles Barkley* ▪ PHO / 27.5; 3 / Shaquille O'Neal* ▪ ORL / 27.4; 4 / Michael Jordan* ▪ CHI / 26.7; 5 / Arvydas Sabonis* ▪ POR / 24.7	True shooting pct: 1 / Will Perdue ▪ SAS / .728; 2 / Chuck Person ▪ SAS / .716; 3 / Horace Grant ▪ ORL / .671; 4 / Eddie Jones ▪ LAL / .657; 5 / Jeff Hornacek ▪ UTA / .648	Effective field goal pct: 1 / Chuck Person ▪ SAS / .695; 2 / Adam Keefe ▪ UTA / .691; 3 / Will Perdue ▪ SAS / .690; 4 / Eddie Jones ▪ LAL / .653; 5 / Horace Grant ▪ ORL / .649
Offensive rebound pct: 1 / Dennis Rodman* ▪ CHI / 18.3; 2 / Ervin Johnson ▪ SEA / 15.2; 3 / Dale Davis ▪ IND / 14.5; 4 / Shaquille O'Neal* ▪ ORL / 13.5; 5 / Will Perdue ▪ SAS / 13.4	Defensive rebound pct: 1 / Dennis Rodman* ▪ CHI / 30.9; 2 / Charles Barkley* ▪ PHO / 27.5; 3 / Arvydas Sabonis* ▪ POR / 27.5; 4 / Will Perdue ▪ SAS / 25.8; 5 / Patrick Ewing* ▪ NYK / 25.4	Total rebound pct: 1 / Dennis Rodman* ▪ CHI / 24.3; 2 / Will Perdue ▪ SAS / 19.7; 3 / Charles Barkley* ▪ PHO / 18.8; 4 / Dale Davis ▪ IND / 18.7; 5 / Shawn Kemp ▪ SEA / 18.2	Assist pct: 1 / Rod Strickland ▪ POR / 48.0; 2 / Kevin Johnson ▪ PHO / 47.3; 3 / John Stockton* ▪ UTA / 45.9; 4 / Avery Johnson ▪ SAS / 38.9; 5 / Howard Eisley ▪ UTA / 33.5
Steal pct: 1 / Clyde Drexler* ▪ HOU / 3.7; 2 / Scottie Pippen* ▪ CHI / 3.5; 3 / Robert Horry ▪ HOU / 3.5; 4 / Nate McMillan ▪ SEA / 3.3; 5 / Craig Ehlo ▪ ATL / 3.0	Block pct: 1 / Greg Ostertag ▪ UTA / 9.0; 2 / Felton Spencer ▪ UTA / 7.2; 3 / Patrick Ewing* ▪ NYK / 6.0; 4 / Luc Longley ▪ CHI / 5.2; 5 / Ervin Johnson ▪ SEA / 5.0	Turnover pct: 1 / Vinny Del Negro ▪ SAS / 4.3; 2 / Horace Grant ▪ ORL / 5.6; 3 / Charles Barkley* ▪ PHO / 6.2; 4 / Mario Elie ▪ HOU / 6.6; 5 / Bryon Russell ▪ UTA / 6.6	Usage pct: 1 / Karl Malone* ▪ UTA / 34.9; 2 / Michael Jordan* ▪ CHI / 32.9; 3 / Shaquille O'Neal* ▪ ORL / 32.3; 4 / David Robinson* ▪ SAS / 31.6; 5 / Arvydas Sabonis* ▪ POR / 30.7
Offensive rating: 1 / Horace Grant ▪ ORL / 141.8; 2 / Will Perdue ▪ SAS / 131.4; 3 / Chuck Person ▪ SAS / 130.5; 4 / Jeff Hornacek ▪ UTA / 128.0; 5 / Steve Kerr ▪ CHI / 126.2	Defensive rating: 1 / Scottie Pippen* ▪ CHI / 96.1; 2 / Karl Malone* ▪ UTA / 96.6; 3 / Dennis Rodman* ▪ CHI / 96.7; 4 / Patrick Ewing* ▪ NYK / 97.5; 5 / Greg Ostertag ▪ UTA / 97.6	Offensive win shares: 1 / Michael Jordan* ▪ CHI / 3.4; 2 / Jeff Hornacek ▪ UTA / 2.3; 3 / Gary Payton* ▪ SEA / 1.9; 4 / Penny Hardaway ▪ ORL / 1.8; 5 / Shawn Kemp ▪ SEA / 1.5	Defensive win shares: 1 / Scottie Pippen* ▪ CHI / 1.7; 2 / Karl Malone* ▪ UTA / 1.6; 3 / Shawn Kemp ▪ SEA / 1.4; 4 / Dennis Rodman* ▪ CHI / 1.4; 5 / Michael Jordan* ▪ CHI / 1.3
Win shares: 1 / Michael Jordan* ▪ CHI / 4.7; 2 / Jeff Hornacek ▪ UTA / 3.1; 3 / Gary Payton* ▪ SEA / 3.1; 4 / Scottie Pippen* ▪ CHI / 3.0; 5 / Shawn Kemp ▪ SEA / 3.0	Win shares per 48 minutes: 1 / Michael Jordan* ▪ CHI / .306; 2 / Jeff Hornacek ▪ UTA / .233; 3 / Horace Grant ▪ ORL / .221; 4 / David Robinson* ▪ SAS / .214; 5 / Bryon Russell ▪ UTA / .213	Box plus/minus: 1 / Scottie Pippen* ▪ CHI / 9.3; 2 / Michael Jordan* ▪ CHI / 8.1; 3 / Jeff Hornacek ▪ UTA / 7.8; 4 / Bryon Russell ▪ UTA / 7.7; 5 / Karl Malone* ▪ UTA / 7.1	Offensive box plus/minus: 1 / Michael Jordan* ▪ CHI / 8.1; 2 / Jeff Hornacek ▪ UTA / 7.1; 3 / Scottie Pippen* ▪ CHI / 5.1; 4 / Rod Strickland ▪ POR / 4.9; 5 / Eddie Jones ▪ LAL / 4.6
Defensive box plus/minus: 1 / Robert Horry ▪ HOU / 5.4; 2 / Hakeem Olajuwon* ▪ HOU / 4.9; 3 / Patrick Ewing* ▪ NYK / 4.7; 4 / Charles Smith ▪ SAS / 4.4; 5 / Clyde Drexler* ▪ HOU / 4.3	Value over replacement player: 1 / Scottie Pippen* ▪ CHI / 2.1; 2 / Michael Jordan* ▪ CHI / 1.9; 3 / Gary Payton* ▪ SEA / 1.8; 4 / Karl Malone* ▪ UTA / 1.6; 5 / Jeff Hornacek ▪ UTA / 1.6		

== Salaries ==
Rk	Player	Salary
1.	Michael Jordan	$3,850,000
2	Toni Kukoč	$3,560,000
3	Ron Harper	$3,120,000
4	Scottie Pippen	$2,925,000
5	Dennis Rodman	$2,500,000
6	Luc Longley	$2,300,000
7	Bill Wennington	$1,000,000
8	Randy Brown	$900,000
9	Dickey Simpkins	$845,000
10	Steve Kerr	$800,000
11	Jason Caffey	$627,000
12	Jud Buechler	$300,000
13	James Edwards	$225,000
14	Jack Haley	$225,000

== Award winners ==
- Phil Jackson, NBA Coach of the Year
- Michael Jordan, All-NBA First Team
- Michael Jordan, All-Star Game MVP
- Michael Jordan, NBA MVP
- Michael Jordan, NBA Finals MVP
- Michael Jordan, NBA All-Defensive First Team
- Michael Jordan, Regular season leader, Field Goals (916)
- Michael Jordan, Regular season leader, Field Goal Attempts (1850)
- Michael Jordan, Regular season leader, Total Points (2491)
- Michael Jordan, Regular season leader, Scoring Average (30.4 points per game)
- Scottie Pippen, All-NBA First Team
- Scottie Pippen, NBA All-Defensive First Team
- Dennis Rodman, NBA All-Defensive First Team
- Dennis Rodman, Regular season leader, Rebounds Per Game (14.9)
- Dennis Rodman, Regular season leader, Offensive Rebounds (356)
- Dennis Rodman, Regular season leader, Rebound Rate (26.6)
- Toni Kukoč, NBA Sixth Man of the Year
- Jerry Krause, NBA Executive of the Year Award

=== NBA All-Star Game ===
- Michael Jordan, Guard
- Scottie Pippen, Forward
