= Hugh Evans (basketball) =

American basketball referee (1941–2022)

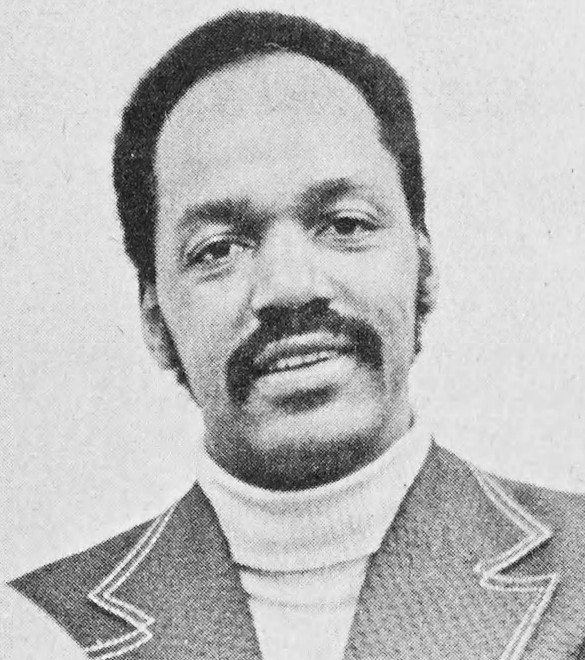
- Evans in 1974

Personal information
- Born: November 8, 1940 Squire, West Virginia, U.S.
- Died: July 8, 2022 (aged 81)

Career information
- College: North Carolina A&T (1959–1963)
- NBA draft: 1963: 12th round, 80th overall pick
- Drafted by: St. Louis Hawks
- Officiating career: 1972–2001
- Stats at Basketball Reference
- Basketball Hall of Fame

Hubert "Hugh" Evans (November 8, 1940 – July 8, 2022) was an American basketball referee in the National Basketball Association (NBA) for 28 seasons. He worked 1,969 regular season NBA games and 35 NBA Finals games during his NBA officiating career from 1972 to 2001. He subsequently served as an assistant supervisor of officials in the NBA front office.

== Early life ==
Evans was born in Squire, West Virginia, in 1940. He studied at North Carolina A&T State University, where he played basketball and baseball for the Aggies. After graduating, he was selected in the 12th round (80th overall) of the 1963 NBA draft by the St. Louis Hawks, becoming the third player from A&T to be drafted by an NBA team after Al Attles and Herbert Gray. However, Evans opted to pursue baseball and played several seasons in the minor leagues for the San Francisco Giants. During the 1963 season, he posted a .288 batting average with 6 home runs and 25 runs batted in (RBI) in 48 games for the Salem Rebels, a Giants affiliate playing in the Appalachian League.

== Career ==
Evans relocated to New York City and was director of a community center in Brooklyn by 1968. He paid $100 to sign up for an officials’ camp – later calling it "the best investment I ever made" – and officiated amateur basketball games in the summer league held at Rucker Park in Harlem. The camp director soon asked him whether he would be interested in refereeing professional games. Evans subsequently agreed to a part-time contract with the NBA in 1972 to officiate 47 games, before becoming a full-time referee the following year. He became the second NBA referee to come from a historically Black college or university after Ken Hudson.

Evans ultimately officiated 1,969 regular-season games, 170 playoff games, 35 NBA Finals, and four NBA All-Star Games throughout his 28-year career. One memorable game he officiated was Game 5 of the 1984 NBA Finals, in which he became dehydrated and fainted at one point. He worked the first half of the game, but was replaced by John Vanak for the second half. This game was played in 97-degree heat in Boston Garden. During the 1995–96 NBA season, Evans was ranked the second best official in the league by coaches, general managers, and NBA Senior Vice President, Basketball Operations Rod Thorn. His final game was Game 4 of the 2001 NBA Finals, played at the Wachovia Center in Philadelphia, Pennsylvania, on June 13, 2001. Evans wore the uniform number 25 during his career in the NBA.

== Later life ==
After retiring as a referee in 2001, Evans became an assistant supervisor of NBA officials, a position he held till 2003. He was inducted into New York City Basketball Hall of Fame and North Carolina A&T Hall of Fame in 2002. In April 2022, a few months before his death, he was named to the Naismith Memorial Basketball Hall of Fame, to become one of six NBA referees at date honored in the hall. He was enshrined posthumously in September 2022.

== Personal life ==
Evans was married to Cathy Evans until his death. Hugh had two children: Aaron and Todd. He later moved to the Atlanta metropolitan area.

Evans died on the morning of July 8, 2022 from congestive heart failure.
