= Squires (surname) =

Squires is a surname. Notable people with the surname include:

== Arts and entertainment ==
- Bruce Squires (1910–1981), American swing jazz trombonist
- David Squires (cartoonist) (born 1974), British-Australian cartoonist
- David Squires (composer) (born 1957), Canadian composer, university dean
- Geoffrey Squires (born 1942), Irish poet
- Gerald Squires (1937–2015), Canadian painter
- Dorothy Squires (1915–1998), Welsh vocalist
- Dougie Squires (1932–2023), English choreographer
- Roger Squires (1932–2023), British crossword compiler
- Tony Squires (born 1961), Australian media personality
- Mickey Squires (born 1952), American actor and model

== Military ==
- Ernest Squires (1882–1940), British and Australian army officer
- John C. Squires (1925–1944), United States Army soldier
- Peter J. M. Squires (born 1968), senior Royal Air Force officer
- Robert Squires (1927–2016), British Royal Navy officer

== Politics ==
- Carolyn Squires (1940–2016), American politician
- Delphine Anderson Squires (1868–1961), American suffragist and journalist
- Helena Squires (1879–1959), Canadian politician
- Richard Squires (1880–1940), Prime Minister of Newfoundland
- Ron Squires (1952–1993), United States politician in Vermont

== Sport ==
- Frank Squires (1921–1988), Welsh footballer
- Greg Squires (born 1988), American ice hockey player
- Jamie Squires (born 1975), English footballer
- Mike Squires (baseball) (born 1952), American baseball player
- Peter Squires (sportsman) (1951–2026), English rugby union footballer
- Stan Squires (1909–1950), English cricketer

== Other ==
- Catherine Squires (1941–2021), American scientist
- Frank C. Squires (1871–1934), American architect
- Frederick C. Squires (1881–1960), Canadian lawyer
- Hilary Squires (1933–2019), retired South African judge and barrister
- Raymond Squires (1926–2019), Canadian businessman

== See also ==
- Wilda Gerideau-Squires (born 1946), African-American fine art photographer
- Squire (name)
