= 1984–85 Miami Redskins men's basketball team =

American college basketball season

1984–85 Miami Redskins men's basketball

NCAA tournament
- Conference: Mid-American Conference
- Record: 20–11 (13–5 MAC)
- Head coach: Jerry Peirson (1st season)
- Home arena: Millett Hall

1984–85 Mid-American Conference men's basketball standings
| | Conf. | | | | Overall |
| Team | W | | L | PCT | W | | L | PCT |
|---|---|---|---|---|---|---|---|---|
| Ohio † | 14 | – | 4 | .778 | 22 | – | 8 | .733 |
| Miami | 13 | – | 5 | .722 | 20 | – | 11 | .645 |
| Toledo | 11 | – | 7 | .611 | 16 | – | 12 | .571 |
| Kent State | 11 | – | 7 | .611 | 17 | – | 13 | .567 |
| Eastern Michigan | 9 | – | 9 | .500 | 15 | – | 13 | .536 |
| Ball State | 8 | – | 10 | .444 | 13 | – | 16 | .448 |
| Western Michigan | 7 | – | 11 | .389 | 12 | – | 16 | .429 |
| Northern Illinois | 7 | – | 11 | .389 | 11 | – | 16 | .407 |
| Bowling Green | 6 | – | 12 | .333 | 12 | – | 15 | .444 |
| Central Michigan | 4 | – | 14 | .222 | 9 | – | 18 | .333 |
† 1985 MAC tournament winner Rankings from AP Poll

The 1984–85 Miami Redskins men's basketball team represent Miami University in the 1984–85 NCAA Division I men's basketball season. The Redskins, led by 1st-year head coach Jerry Peirson, played their home games at Millett Hall in Oxford, Ohio as members of the Mid-American Conference. The team finished second in the conference regular season standings, and followed by reaching the championship game of the MAC tournament to earn an at-large bid to the NCAA tournament. As the No. 12 seed in the Southeast region, Miami was beaten by the No. 5 seed Maryland Terrapins, a team that featured standout Len Bias, in the opening round, 69–68 in OT.

Junior Ron Harper was named MAC Player of the Year, and established school records for points in a game (45), season (772; surpassed by Wally Szczerbiak in 1998–99), and career (1,620). Harper also set school records for steals in a game (7; surpassed by Darrian Ringo in 2017–18), season (82; surpassed by Harper the following season), and career (176). By the time his career ended, Harper would extend his career records in points and steals, and finished as Miami's career leader in rebounds as well.

== Roster ==
1984–85 Miami RedHawks men's basketball team
Players
Coaches

| Pos. | # | Name | Height | Weight | Year | Hometown |
|---|---|---|---|---|---|---|
| F | 34 | Ron Harper | 6 ft 6 in (1.98 m) | 195 lb (88 kg) | Jr | Dayton, Ohio |
| C | | Rusty Doyle | 6 ft 8 in (2.03 m) | — | So |
| F | | Jeff Fuerst | 6 ft 7 in (2.01 m) | — | Fr |
| F | | Mike Hall | 6 ft 6 in (1.98 m) | — | So |
| F | | Lamont Hanna | 6 ft 7 in (2.01 m) | — | Fr |
| F | | Ron Hunter | 6 ft 4 in (1.93 m) | — | Jr | Dayton, Ohio |
| C | | Tim Lampe | 6 ft 8 in (2.03 m) | — | Jr |
| G | | Dernard Newell | 6 ft 2 in (1.88 m) | — | So |
| G | | Eric Newsome | 5 ft 8 in (1.73 m) | — | So |
| G | | Ed Schilling | 6 ft 2 in (1.88 m) | — | Fr | Lebanon, Indiana |
| G | | Todd Staker | 6 ft 3 in (1.91 m) | — | Fr |

Head coach

- Jerry Peirson

Assistant coach(es)

Legend

- (C) Team captain
- (S) Suspended
- (I) Ineligible
- (W) Walk-on
- Injured
- Current redshirt

== Schedule and results ==
| Date time, TV | Rank^{#} | Opponent^{#} | Result | Record | Site (attendance) city, state |
Non-conference regular season
| Dec 1, 1984* | | Marietta | W 82–63 | 1–0 | Millett Hall (5,433); Oxford, Ohio |
| Dec 5, 1984* | | at Purdue | W 84–79 | 2–0 | Mackey Arena (12,703); West Lafayette, Indiana |
| Dec 8, 1984* | | Cincinnati | L 77–80 | 2–1 | Millett Hall (7,530); Oxford, Ohio |
| Dec 12, 1984* | | Dayton | W 69–64 | 3–1 | Millett Hall (5,867); Oxford, Ohio |
| Dec 15, 1984* | | Capital | W 68–59 | 4–1 | Millett Hall (3,035); Oxford, Ohio |
| Dec 22, 1984* | | at Xavier | L 85–88 | 4–2 | Cincinnati Gardens (5,222); Cincinnati, Ohio |
| Dec 29, 1984* | | vs. No. 15 Indiana; Hoosier Classic | L 72–77 | 4–3 | Market Square Arena (16,754); Indianapolis, Indiana |
| Dec 30, 1984* | | vs. Arizona State; Hoosier Classic | W 68–52 | 5–3 | Market Square Arena (16,754); Indianapolis, Indiana |
MAC regular season
| Jan 3, 1985 | | at Ohio | L 62–73 | 5–4 (0–1) | Convocation Center (6,588); Athens, Ohio |
| Jan 5, 1985 | | Central Michigan | W 91–59 | 6–4 (1–1) | Millett Hall (2,850); Oxford, Ohio |
| Jan 9, 1985 | | at Bowling Green | W 56–50 | 7–4 (2–1) | Anderson Arena (3,517); Bowling Green, Ohio |
| Jan 12, 1985 | | Eastern Michigan | W 58–48 | 8–4 (3–1) | Millett Hall (3,367); Oxford, Ohio |
| Jan 16, 1985 | | at Toledo | L 65–74 | 8–5 (3–2) | Centennial Hall (7,922); Toledo, Ohio |
| Jan 19, 1985 | | Northern Illinois | W 88–62 | 9–5 (4–2) | Millett Hall (4,487); Oxford, Ohio |
| Jan 23, 1985 | | at Kent State | L 69–80 | 9–6 (4–3) | Memorial Gymnasium (5,303); Kent, Ohio |
| Jan 26, 1985 | | Ball State | W 93–89 ^{OT} | 10–6 (5–3) | Millett Hall (5,195); Oxford, Ohio |
| Jan 28, 1985* | | at Dayton | L 54–63 | 10–7 | University of Dayton Arena (12,060); Dayton, Ohio |
| Jan 30, 1985 | | Western Michigan | W 82–59 | 11–7 (6–3) | Millett Hall (5,303); Oxford, Ohio |
| Feb 2, 1985 | | at Central Michigan | W 69–59 | 12–7 (7–3) | Rose Arena (2,710); Mount Pleasant, Michigan |
| Feb 5, 1985 | | Bowling Green | W 73–63 | 13–7 (8–3) | Millett Hall (3,445); Oxford, Ohio |
| Feb 9, 1985 | | at Eastern Michigan | W 65–64 | 14–7 (9–3) | Bowen Field House (3,800); Ypsilanti, Michigan |
| Feb 12, 1985 | | Toledo | W 70–69 | 15–7 (10–3) | Millett Hall (2,260); Oxford, Ohio |
| Feb 16, 1985 | | at Northern Illinois | L 61–63 | 15–8 (10–4) | Chick Evans Field House (5,990); DeKalb, Illinois |
| Feb 20, 1985 | | Kent State | W 70–69 | 16–8 (11–4) | Millett Hall (3,728); Oxford, Ohio |
| Feb 23, 1985 | | at Ball State | L 81–92 | 16–9 (11–5) | Irving Gymnasium (5,460); Muncie, Indiana |
| Feb 27, 1985 | | at Western Michigan | W 76–69 | 17–9 (12–5) | Read Fieldhouse (2,034); Kalamazoo, Michigan |
| Mar 2, 1985 | | Ohio | W 67–66 | 18–9 (13–5) | Millett Hall (9,842); Oxford, Ohio |
MAC tournament
| Mar 5, 1985* | (2) | vs. (7) Western Michigan; Quarterfinals | W 78–64 | 19–9 | Centennial Hall; Toledo, Ohio |
| Mar 6, 1985* | (2) | vs. (6) Ball State; Semifinals | W 91–70 | 20–9 | Centennial Hall; Toledo, Ohio |
| Mar 7, 1985* | (2) | vs. (1) Ohio; Championship game | L 64–74 | 20–10 | Centennial Hall; Toledo, Ohio |
NCAA tournament
| Mar 15, 1985* | (12 SE) | vs. (5 SE) Maryland; First round | L 68–69 ^{OT} | 20–11 | University of Dayton Arena; Dayton, Ohio |
*Non-conference game. ^{#}Rankings from AP poll. (#) Tournament seedings in parentheses. SE=Southeast. All times are in Eastern Time.

== Awards and honors ==
- Ron Harper – MAC Player of the Year
