= Squires Gate (disambiguation) =

Squires Gate is a district in Blackpool, England.

Squires Gate may also refer to:

- Squires Gate F.C.
- Squires Gate railway station
- Squires Gate Airport, or RAF Squires Gate, former names of Blackpool Airport
- Blackpool Squires Gate Greyhound Stadium
