= Bruce Squires =

American jazz musician

Bruce Willmarth Squires (January 21, 1910, Berkeley, California – May 8, 1981, North Hollywood, California) was an American swing jazz trombonist.

From 1935 to 1937 he was a member of the Ben Pollack band. As Dean and His Kids, they recorded "Spreadin' Knowledge Around/Zoom Zoom Zoom" (Vocalion 1936). Following this he worked with Jimmy Dorsey (1937–38), Gene Krupa (1938–39), Benny Goodman (1939), Harry James (1939–40), Freddie Slack (1940–41), and Bob Crosby (1942). He was a studio musician after World War II and worked in music for the next three decades.
