= Squire (name) =

Squire is both a surname and a given name. Notable people with the name include:

Surname:

- Aurin Squire, American producer, playwright, screenwriter and reporter
- Chris Squire (1948–2015), bassist with the progressive rock group Yes
- Damian Squire (born 1973), retired Australian rules footballer
- Edward Squire (died 1598), English scrivener and sailor, and alleged conspirator against Queen Elizabeth I of England
- Edward Squire (public servant) (1837–1893), Deputy Postmaster General and Superintendent of Telegraphs in South Australia
- Feargus B. Squire (1850–1932), American businessman and politician
- Henri Squire, German tennis player
- Henry Squire, Archdeacon of Barnstaple from 1554 to 1582
- J. C. Squire (1884–1958), British poet and historian
- James Squire (1754–1822), transportee and brewer credited with the first successful cultivation of hops in Australia
- Jeff Squire (born 1951), Welsh former international rugby union player
- John Squire (born 1962), British rock guitarist
- Katherine Squire (1903–1995), American actress
- Larry Squire, American psychologist
- Lovell Squire (1809–1892), Quaker schoolteacher
- Matt Squire (born 1976), American music producer
- Nikki Squire (born 1967), Irish cricketer
- Peter Squire (1945–2018), retired Royal Air Force air chief marshal
- Rachel Squire (1954–2006), British Labour politician
- Raglan Squire (1912–2004), British architect; son of J. C. Squire
- Robin Squire (born 1944), British Conservative politician
- Ronald Squire (1886–1958), British character actor
- Rosemary Squire (born 1956), British theatre producer
- Samuel Squire (1714–1766), bishop of the Church of England and historian
- Sarah Squire (born 1949), British diplomat
- Stanley John Squire (1915–1998), Canadian politician
- Watson C. Squire (1838–1926), governor of Washington Territory and later United States Senator from the state of Washington
- William Squire (1917–1989), Welsh actor
- William Henry Squire (1871–1963), British composer and cellist

Given name:

- Squire (died 1837), American escaped slave and gang leader who went by the nom-de-plume Bras-Coupé
- Squire Bancroft (1841–1926), English actor-manager
- Squire Bence (1597–1648), English merchant, seafarer and member of the House of Commons
- Squire Booker (born 1965), American biochemist
- Squire Boone Sr. (1696–1765), English Quaker settler in America, father of Daniel Boone
- Squire Boone (1744–1815), American pioneer and brother of Daniel Boone
- Squire S. Case (1801–1878), American businessman and politician
- Squire Fridell (born 1943), American actor
- Squire Gersh (1913–1983), American jazz tubist and double-bassist
- Squire E. Howard (1840–1912), Massachusetts politician
- Squire Jeremiah, Nauruan politician
- Squire Parsons (1948–2025), American singer-songwriter
- Squire Potter (1902–1983), American baseball player
- Squire Reid (1887–1949), Australian politician
- Squire D. Rushnell, American author and TV executive
- Squire Stockwell (1896–1970), English international rugby league footballer
- Squire J. Vickers (1872–1947), a chief architect of the New York City subway system
- Squire Whipple (1804–1888), American bridging engineer
- Squire White (1785–1857), American politician and jurist
- Squire Wilkins (1924–2012), England international rugby union player

== See also ==
- Squires (surname)
