= The Squires (disambiguation) =

The Squires were Neil Young's first band.

The Squires may also refer to:

- The Squires (Connecticut band), a garage rock band from Bristol, Connecticut
- The Squires, an Ohio garage rock band that featured Phil Keaggy
- The Squires, a band that backed Tom Jones until 1969
- The Squires, a band which later became the Count Five
- Curtis Knight and the Squires, led by Curtis Knight and featuring Jimi Hendrix
