= Squire, West Virginia =

Squire
- Unincorporated community
- Location within the state of West Virginia Squire (the United States)
- Coordinates: 37°14′18″N 81°36′35″W
- Country: United States
- State: West Virginia
- County: McDowell
- Elevation: 1,663 ft (507 m)
- Time zone: UTC-5 (Eastern (EST))
  - Summer (DST): UTC-4 (EDT)
- ZIP code: 24884
- Area codes: 304 & 681
- GNIS feature ID: 1547294

Squire is an unincorporated community in McDowell County, West Virginia, United States. Squire is located on West Virginia Route 16, 6.5 miles (10.5 km) southeast of War. Squire has a post office with ZIP code 24884.

The community was named after A.C. "Squire" Christian, a local law enforcement agent.
