= Lindsey Hunter =

American basketball player and coach (born 1970)

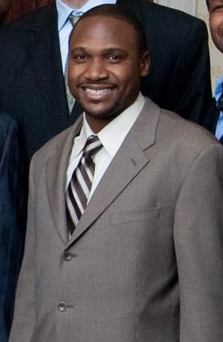
- Hunter visits the White House in 2009 before the Chicago Bulls' game against the Washington Wizards.

Personal information
- Born: December 3, 1970 (age 55) Utica, Mississippi, U.S.
- Listed height: 6 ft 2 in (1.88 m)
- Listed weight: 195 lb (88 kg)

Career information
- High school: Murrah (Jackson, Mississippi)
- College: Alcorn State (1988–1989); Jackson State (1990–1993)
- NBA draft: 1993: 1st round, 10th overall pick
- Drafted by: Detroit Pistons
- Playing career: 1993–2010
- Position: Point guard / shooting guard
- Number: 1, 11, 10

Career history

Playing
- 1993–2000: Detroit Pistons
- 2000–2001: Milwaukee Bucks
- 2001–2002: Los Angeles Lakers
- 2002–2003: Toronto Raptors
- 2003–2008: Detroit Pistons
- 2008–2010: Chicago Bulls

Career highlights
- 2× NBA champion (2002, 2004); NBA All-Rookie Second Team (1994); SWAC Player of the Year (1993)

Career statistics
- Points: 7,956 (8.5 ppg)
- Rebounds: 2,021 (2.2 rpg)
- Assists: 2,506 (2.7 apg)
- Stats at NBA.com
- Stats at Basketball Reference

Lindsey Benson Hunter Jr. (born December 3, 1970) is an American former professional basketball player and coach. He played in the National Basketball Association (NBA) from 1993 to 2010, spending most of his career with the Detroit Pistons. He was also the interim head coach of the Phoenix Suns in 2013. Most recently, he served as the head coach at Mississippi Valley State. In 2025 he was Head Coach of the Sparta Spartans for a few months.

== Basketball career ==
After playing basketball at Murrah High School in Jackson, Mississippi, alongside phenom James Robinson, Hunter enrolled at Alcorn State University, then transferred to Jackson State University after his freshman year. While playing for the Jackson State Tigers, he became arguably the school's highest profile athlete since the days of Walter Payton and Jackie Slater.

The Detroit Pistons had two first-round picks in the 1993 NBA draft. They selected Hunter with the 10th pick and chose Tennessee guard Allan Houston with the 11th. As a rookie, Hunter played in all 82 games, while averaging 10.3 points and what would be a career-high 4.8 assists per game. During the 1996-97 NBA season, Hunter averaged a career-high 14.2 points per game, before then averaging a playoff career-high 15 points per game during a 3–2 first round loss to the Hawks. His first stint in Detroit lasted from 1993 to 2000 when he was traded to the Milwaukee Bucks for Billy Owens. He was a key role player with the Bucks for one season, playing the fifth-most minutes of any Buck en route to the team's 4–3 Eastern Conference Finals loss, before being sent to the Los Angeles Lakers in exchange for Greg Foster the following season. Hunter was a contributor on the Lakers team that won the NBA championship in 2001–02.

Following that season, Hunter was dealt again (on draft night 2002), this time to the Toronto Raptors, along with the rights to Chris Jefferies, for Tracy Murray and Kareem Rush. In August 2003, the Pistons re-acquired Hunter by sending Michael Curry to the Raptors. He was traded to the Boston Celtics in February 2004 along with Chucky Atkins and Detroit's 2004 first-round draft pick for Mike James, in order to make the salary cap figures work out for the trade that brought Rasheed Wallace to the Pistons. Hunter never played a game for the Celtics; he was immediately released and re-signed by Detroit a week later. Hunter and the Pistons went on to win the 2003–04 NBA championship. Hunter and the Pistons went back to the Finals in 2004–2005, but Detroit lost the series in seven games to the San Antonio Spurs. During the Pistons Finals runs, Hunter was credited as a tenacious on-ball defender off the bench. He was credited with guarding Jason Kidd, Kobe Bryant, and Tony Parker in Detroit's two Finals runs.

On March 7, 2007, Hunter was suspended for ten games after testing positive for phentermine. He claimed he was using his wife's diet pills, which made him test positive for the banned substance.

Hunter signed a one-year nonguaranteed contract with the Chicago Bulls on November 13, 2008. On July 13, 2009, Hunter re-signed with the Bulls for the veteran minimum of $1.3 million. The Bulls valued Hunter's veteran leadership and mentorship of young point guard Derrick Rose, a role cited as a factor in the team's decision to sign him and then retain him.

At age 39, Hunter was the oldest player active during the 2009–2010 NBA season—until the Bulls waived him on March 3, 2010 (to make room for Chris Richard). Two days later, the Bulls hired him as a player development assistant.

== Coaching career ==
On August 28, 2012, Hunter signed with the Phoenix Suns as an assistant coach for player development. After the Suns opened the season with a 13–28 record, Hunter was named Phoenix's interim head coach, replacing Alvin Gentry on January 20, 2013. In his head coaching debut, Hunter led the Suns to a 106–96 victory over the Sacramento Kings. In May 2013, Hunter was replaced by Jeff Hornacek. On September 18, 2013, Hunter joined the Golden State Warriors as an assistant coach.

On June 13, 2016, Hunter was named an assistant coach on Nate Oats' staff at the University at Buffalo.

On April 20, 2019, Hunter was named the head coach at Mississippi Valley State University. He went 7–74 in three years at the helm before stepping down in March 2022.

On July 2, 2025, Hunter was named the head coach of the boys varsity basketball team at Sparta High School (Michigan) in Sparta, Michigan.

On September 23, 2025, Sparta Superintendent Joel Stoner announced that Hunter and the District mutually agreed to separate employment.

== NBA career statistics ==
Legend
GP	Games played	GS	Games started	MPG	Minutes per game
FG%	Field goal percentage	3P%	3-point field goal percentage	FT%	Free throw percentage
RPG	Rebounds per game	APG	Assists per game	SPG	Steals per game
BPG	Blocks per game	PPG	Points per game	**Bold**	Career high
†	Won an NBA championship

=== Regular season ===
Year	Team	GP	GS	MPG	FG%	3P%	FT%	RPG	APG	SPG	BPG	PPG
1993–94	Detroit	**82**	26	26.5	.375	.333	.732	2.3	**4.8**	1.5	.1	10.3
1994–95	Detroit	42	26	22.5	.374	.333	.727	1.8	3.8	1.2	.2	7.5
1995–96	Detroit	80	48	26.7	.381	.405	.700	2.4	2.4	1.1	.2	8.5
1996–97	Detroit	**82**	76	**36.9**	.404	.355	.778	2.8	1.9	1.6	**.3**	**14.2**
1997–98	Detroit	71	67	35.3	.383	.321	.740	**3.5**	3.2	1.7	.1	12.1
1998–99	Detroit	49	49	35.8	**.435**	.386	.753	3.4	3.9	**1.8**	.2	11.9
1999–2000	Detroit	**82**	**82**	35.6	.425	**.432**	.760	3.0	4.0	1.6	**.3**	12.7
2000–01	Milwaukee	**82**	5	24.4	.381	.373	.802	2.1	2.7	1.2	.1	10.1
2001–02†	L.A. Lakers	**82**	47	19.7	.382	.380	.500	1.5	1.6	.8	.2	5.8
2002–03	Toronto	29	0	23.2	.351	.318	.723	2.0	2.4	1.2	.2	9.7
2003–04†	Detroit	33	8	20.0	.343	.280	.625	2.0	2.6	1.2	.2	3.5
2004–05	Detroit	76	3	15.1	.358	.274	.793	1.6	1.7	.9	.2	3.8
2005–06	Detroit	30	1	11.8	.370	.256	.500	1.3	2.1	.6	.0	2.9
2006–07	Detroit	52	0	14.3	.385	.319	.909	.9	1.8	.7	.1	4.9
2007–08	Detroit	24	0	9.0	.344	.269	.778	.5	1.4	.5	.1	2.4
2008–09	Chicago	28	0	9.5	.329	.333	.600	.4	1.3	.7	.0	2.6
2009–10	Chicago	13	0	9.4	.167	.077	**1.000**	1.1	.7	.1	.0	1.0
**Career**		937	439	24.8	.388	.360	.746	2.2	2.7	1.2	.2	8.5

=== Playoffs ===
Year	Team	GP	GS	MPG	FG%	3P%	FT%	RPG	APG	SPG	BPG	PPG
1996	Detroit	2	0	18.0	.250	.250	.500	1.0	.5	.5	.0	3.0
1997	Detroit	5	**5**	**40.2**	**.439**	.414	.714	**3.6**	1.2	1.2	.2	**15.0**
1999	Detroit	5	**5**	36.0	.264	.273	**1.000**	3.0	**2.4**	1.4	.0	7.2
2000	Detroit	3	3	31.0	.313	.111	.667	2.3	1.7	**1.7**	**.3**	8.3
2001	Milwaukee	18	0	16.1	.242	.151	.727	1.7	1.9	.8	.2	3.6
2002†	L.A. Lakers	18	0	7.3	.311	.276	.000	.4	.6	.1	.0	2.0
2004†	Detroit	23	0	11.9	.292	.233	.917	1.4	.9	.8	.2	2.4
2005	Detroit	**25**	0	15.0	.319	.222	.727	1.6	1.6	.9	**.3**	3.8
2006	Detroit	18	0	12.1	.333	.318	**1.000**	1.1	1.6	.8	.1	4.2
2007	Detroit	13	0	10.2	.226	.222	**1.000**	.8	1.2	.5	.1	1.8
2008	Detroit	11	0	10.5	.381	**.455**	.000	.9	1.3	.7	.0	1.9
2009	Chicago	6	0	4.0	.333	.333	.750	.8	.8	.3	.0	1.0
**Career**		147	13	14.1	.309	.260	.810	1.3	1.3	.7	.1	3.5

== Head coaching record ==
=== NCAA DI ===
Record table
Season	Team	Overall	Conference	Standing	Postseason
Mississippi Valley State Delta Devils (Southwestern Athletic Conference) (2019–2022)
2019–20	Mississippi Valley State	3–27	3–15	T–9th	
2020–21	Mississippi Valley State	2–22	2–13	10th	
2021–22	Mississippi Valley State	2–26	2–16	12th	
Mississippi Valley State:		7–75 (.085)	7–44 (.137)		
Total:		7–75 (.085)			
National champion Postseason invitational champion Conference regular season champion Conference regular season and conference tournament champion Division regular season champion Division regular season and conference tournament champion Conference tournament champion

=== NBA ===
Legend
Regular season	G	Games coached	W	Games won	L	Games lost	W–L %	Win–loss %
Playoffs	PG	Playoff games	PW	Playoff wins	PL	Playoff losses	PW–L %	Playoff win–loss %

Team	Year	G	W	L	W–L%	Finish	PG	PW	PL	PW–L%	Result
Phoenix	2012–13	41	12	29	.293	5th in Pacific	—	—	—	—	Missed Playoffs
Career		41	12	29	.293		—	—	—	—	

== See also ==
- List of people banned or suspended by the NBA
