= 1995–96 Orlando Magic season =

NBA professional basketball team season

- Division champions
- Head coach: Brian Hill
- President: Bob Vander Weide
- General manager: John Gabriel
- Owner: Richard DeVos
- Arena: Orlando Arena

Results
- Record: 60–22 (.732)
- Place: Division: 1st (Atlantic); Conference: 2nd (Eastern)
- Playoff finish: Eastern Conference finals (lost to Bulls 0–4)
- Stats at Basketball Reference

Local media
- Television: WKCF; Sunshine Network
- Radio: WDBO

The 1995–96 Orlando Magic season was the seventh season for the Orlando Magic in the National Basketball Association. The Magic were coming off their trip to the 1995 NBA Finals, where they were swept by the 6th–seeded Houston Rockets in four games.

== Season summary ==
=== Off-season ===
During the off-season, the team signed free agent Jon Koncak, and signed Joe Wolf during the first month of the regular season; Wolf was previously released by the Charlotte Hornets.

=== Regular season ===
The Magic started the regular season without Shaquille O'Neal, who missed the first 22 games due to a preseason thumb injury. Penny Hardaway stepped up in O'Neal's absence, and was named the Player of the Month for November, as the team got off to a 13–2 start to the season. The Magic posted a seven-game winning streak between December and January, and later on held a 34–14 record at the All-Star break. At mid-season, the team traded Jeff Turner to the expansion Vancouver Grizzlies in exchange for Kenny Gattison; however, Gattison never played for the Magic, due to arm and neck injuries he sustained with the Grizzlies, and was out for the remainder of the season. The Magic posted another seven-game winning streak between February and March, and won their second consecutive Atlantic Division title with a franchise-best 60–22 record, earning the second seed in the Eastern Conference.

O'Neal averaged 26.6 points, 11.0 rebounds and 2.1 blocks per game in 54 games, and was named to the All-NBA Third Team, while Hardaway averaged 21.7 points, 7.1 assists and 2.0 steals per game, and was named to the All-NBA First Team, and three-point specialist Dennis Scott contributed 17.5 points per game, and led the league with 267 three-point field goals, a single-season record since broken by Stephen Curry. In addition, Nick Anderson provided the team with 14.7 points, 5.4 rebounds, 3.6 assists and 1.6 steals per game, and contributed 168 three-point field goals, while Horace Grant provided with 13.4 points and 9.2 rebounds per game, and was named to the NBA All-Defensive Second Team. Off the bench, Brian Shaw contributed 6.6 points and 4.5 assists per game, while Donald Royal provided with 5.3 points per game, Wolf averaged 4.6 points and 2.9 rebounds per game, Anthony Bowie contributed 4.2 points per game, and Koncak provided with 3.0 points and 4.1 rebounds per game.

During the NBA All-Star weekend at the Alamodome in San Antonio, Texas, O'Neal and Hardaway were both selected for the 1996 NBA All-Star Game, as members of the Eastern Conference All-Star team. O'Neal led the East with 25 points, 10 rebounds and 2 blocks as they defeated the Western Conference, 129–118; however, despite having the best performance, Michael Jordan, who scored 20 points in 22 minutes, was named the NBA All-Star Game Most Valuable Player, which drew controversy and boos from the fans at the Alamodome. Meanwhile, Scott participated in the NBA Three-Point Shootout for the second time, and second-year guard Darrell Armstrong participated in the NBA Slam Dunk Contest. Hardaway also finished in third place in Most Valuable Player voting, behind Jordan of the Chicago Bulls, and David Robinson of the San Antonio Spurs, while O'Neal finished tied in ninth place; Grant finished tied in eighth place in Defensive Player of the Year voting, and Scott finished tied in eighth place in Most Improved Player voting.

The Magic finished 13th in the NBA in home-game attendance, with an attendance of 707,168 at the Orlando Arena during the regular season.

=== NBA playoffs ===
In the Eastern Conference First Round of the 1996 NBA playoffs, the Magic faced off against the 7th–seeded Detroit Pistons, a team that featured All-Star forward Grant Hill, Allan Houston and Otis Thorpe. The Magic won the first two games over the Pistons at home at the Orlando Arena, before winning Game 3 on the road, 101–98 at The Palace of Auburn Hills, thus winning the series in a three-game sweep.

In the Eastern Conference Semi-finals, the team faced off against the 6th–seeded Atlanta Hawks, a team that featured Steve Smith, Mookie Blaylock and Grant Long. The Magic won the first three games to take a 3–0 series lead, but then lost Game 4 to the Hawks on the road, 104–99 at the Omni Coliseum. The Magic won Game 5 over the Hawks at the Orlando Arena, 96–88 to win the series in five games.

In the Eastern Conference Finals, and for the second consecutive year, the Magic faced off against the top–seeded, and Central Division champion Bulls, who were led by the trio of Jordan, All-Star forward Scottie Pippen, and rebound-specialist Dennis Rodman, and also finished with a then all-time best record of 72–10; the Magic had eliminated the Bulls in the Eastern Conference Semi-finals in the previous year's playoffs. However, Grant suffered an elbow injury in Game 1, in which the Magic lost to the Bulls on the road, 121–83 at the United Center, as he was out for the remainder of the series. The Magic suffered another painful blow when Anderson suffered a wrist injury in Game 3, in which the team lost at the Orlando Arena, 86–67, as he was also out for the rest of the series. Without Grant and Anderson, the Magic lost Game 4 to the Bulls at home, 106–101, thus losing the series in a four-game sweep. Thereby, the Magic became the first team to be eliminated from the NBA playoffs in a sweep for three consecutive seasons since the 1950 Chicago Stags.

The Bulls would defeat the Seattle SuperSonics in six games in the 1996 NBA Finals, winning their fourth NBA championship in six years.

=== Notable highlights and incidents ===
Two notable highlights for the Magic occurred during the regular season. On April 18, 1996, during a home game against the Hawks at the Orlando Arena, Scott set a then-record of 11 three-point field goals in a single game, scoring 35 points and making 11 out of 17 three-point field-goal attempts, as the Magic defeated the Hawks by a score of 119–104. On February 16, in a home game against the Milwaukee Bucks, O'Neal hit his only career three-pointer at the buzzer to end the first quarter; the Magic defeated the Bucks by a score of 121–91.

One notable incident of the season occurred on March 19, 1996, during a home game against the Pistons at the Orlando Arena. With the Magic up by 20 points, Bowie called a timeout with 2.7 seconds left to set up a play, so he could get his first career triple-double. Pistons head coach Doug Collins got upset and viewed this as poor sportsmanship, as he instructed his players off the court to not defend the final play, and then towards the locker room before the game had ended; Collins was fined $5,000 by the league. Bowie posted his first ever career triple-double of 20 points, 10 rebounds and 10 assists, as the Magic defeated the Pistons by a score of 113–91.

=== Aftermath ===
Following the season, O'Neal signed as a free agent with the Los Angeles Lakers after four seasons with the Magic, while Wolf signed with the Milwaukee Bucks, and Gattison and Bowie were both released to free agency.

The Magic would not win another NBA playoff series again until the 2007–08 season.

== Draft picks ==
Round	Pick	Player	Position	Nationality	School/Club team
1	25	David Vaughn	PF	United States	Memphis

== Roster ==
1995–96 Orlando Magic roster
Players

Pos.	No.	Player	Height	Weight	DOB	From
G/F	25	Nick Anderson	6 ft 6 in (1.98 m)	205 lb (93 kg)	1968–01–20	Illinois
G	10	Darrell Armstrong	6 ft 0 in (1.83 m)	170 lb (77 kg)	1968–06–22	Fayetteville State
F	24	Anthony Bonner	6 ft 8 in (2.03 m)	215 lb (98 kg)	1968–06–08	Saint Louis
G	14	Anthony Bowie	6 ft 6 in (1.98 m)	190 lb (86 kg)	1963–11–09	Oklahoma
F	–	Kenny Gattison (IN)	6 ft 8 in (2.03 m)	225 lb (102 kg)	1964–05–23	Old Dominion
F	54	Horace Grant	6 ft 10 in (2.08 m)	215 lb (98 kg)	1965–07–04	Clemson
G	1	Penny Hardaway	6 ft 7 in (2.01 m)	195 lb (88 kg)	1971–07–18	Memphis
F/C	45	Jon Koncak	7 ft 0 in (2.13 m)	235 lb (107 kg)	1963–05–17	SMU
C	32	Shaquille O'Neal	7 ft 1 in (2.16 m)	325 lb (147 kg)	1972–03–06	LSU
F	5	Donald Royal	6 ft 8 in (2.03 m)	210 lb (95 kg)	1966–05–22	Notre Dame
G/F	3	Dennis Scott	6 ft 8 in (2.03 m)	229 lb (104 kg)	1968–09–05	Georgia Tech
G	20	Brian Shaw	6 ft 6 in (1.98 m)	190 lb (86 kg)	1966–03–22	UC Santa Barbara
G	22	Brooks Thompson	6 ft 4 in (1.93 m)	193 lb (88 kg)	1970–07–19	Oklahoma State
F	42	David Vaughn	6 ft 9 in (2.06 m)	240 lb (109 kg)	1973–03–23	Memphis
F	12	Joe Wolf	6 ft 11 in (2.11 m)	230 lb (104 kg)	1964–12–17	North Carolina

Coaches
Head coach
- Brian Hill
Assistant(s)
- Richie Adubato
- Tree Rollins
- Tom Sterner

Legend
- (DP) Unsigned draft pick
- (FA) Free agent
- (S) Suspended
- (IN) Inactive
- Injured

Roster
Updated: April 15, 1996

=== Roster Notes ===
- Power forward Kenny Gattison was acquired by the Magic from the expansion Vancouver Grizzlies in a mid-season trade, but was placed on the injured reserve list due to arm, and neck injuries he sustained with the Grizzlies, and did not play for the Magic.

== Regular season ==
=== Season standings ===
Atlantic Division	W	L	PCT	GB	Home	Road	Div	GP
y–Orlando Magic	60	22	.732	12.0	37‍–‍4	23‍–‍18	21–3	82
x–New York Knicks	47	35	.573	25.0	26‍–‍15	21‍–‍20	16–8	82
x–Miami Heat	42	40	.512	30.0	26‍–‍15	16‍–‍25	13–12	82
Washington Bullets	39	43	.476	33.0	25‍–‍16	14‍–‍27	10–14	82
Boston Celtics	33	49	.402	39.0	18‍–‍23	15‍–‍26	12–12	82
New Jersey Nets	30	52	.366	42.0	20‍–‍21	10‍–‍31	8–17	82
Philadelphia 76ers	18	64	.220	54.0	11‍–‍30	7‍–‍34	5–19	82

Eastern Conference
#	Team	W	L	PCT	GB	GP
1	z–Chicago Bulls	72	10	.878	–	82
2	y–Orlando Magic	60	22	.732	12.0	82
3	x–Indiana Pacers	52	30	.634	20.0	82
4	x–Cleveland Cavaliers	47	35	.573	25.0	82
5	x–New York Knicks	47	35	.573	25.0	82
6	x–Atlanta Hawks	46	36	.561	26.0	82
7	x–Detroit Pistons	46	36	.561	26.0	82
8	x–Miami Heat	42	40	.512	30.0	82
9	Charlotte Hornets	41	41	.500	31.0	82
10	Washington Bullets	39	43	.476	33.0	82
11	Boston Celtics	33	49	.402	39.0	82
12	New Jersey Nets	30	52	.366	42.0	82
13	Milwaukee Bucks	25	57	.305	47.0	82
14	Toronto Raptors	21	61	.256	51.0	82
15	Philadelphia 76ers	18	64	.220	54.0	82

== Playoffs ==
The Magic opened up their playoffs campaign on April 26 against the Detroit Pistons, a game they won convincingly 112–92 at home in the Orlando Arena. The Magic would also win Game 2 at home before clinching the series, and a sweep, of the Pistons in Game 3 away from home at the Palace of Auburn Hills.

The second round put the Magic against the Atlanta Hawks. The Magic opened the series with two convincing wins at home, both with scoring margins greater than 20 points. The Magic carried this momentum into Game 3 away from home at the Omni, winning a closer fought match 102–96. The Hawks won Game 4, avoiding the sweep, but the Magic were too strong and won Game 5 at home to clinch the series 4–1.

The Eastern Conference finals saw the Magic face the Chicago Bulls and Michael Jordan, a team they had eliminated in the previous years playoffs. With Horace Grant out with an elbow injury from Game 1, the dominant Chicago Bulls would prove to be too strong for the Orlando this year, sweeping the series 4-0 and denying the Magic consecutive trips to the NBA finals.

1996 playoff game log
First round: 3–0 (home: 2–0; road: 1–0)

Game	Date	Team	Score	High points	High rebounds	High assists	Location Attendance	Series
1	April 26	Detroit	W 112–92	Dennis Scott (23)	Horace Grant (13)	Brian Shaw (11)	Orlando Arena; 17,248	1–0
2	April 28	Detroit	W 92–77	Shaquille O'Neal (29)	Horace Grant (10)	Penny Hardaway (8)	Orlando Arena; 17,248	2–0
3	April 30	@ Detroit	W 101–98	Penny Hardaway (24)	Horace Grant (16)	Penny Hardaway (5)	The Palace of Auburn Hills; 20,386	3–0

Conference Semi-finals: 4–1 (home: 3–0; road: 1–1)

Game	Date	Team	Score	High points	High rebounds	High assists	Location Attendance	Series
1	May 8	Atlanta	W 117–105	Shaquille O'Neal (41)	Shaquille O'Neal (13)	O'Neal, Hardaway (6)	Orlando Arena; 17,248	1–0
2	May 10	Atlanta	W 120–94	Shaquille O'Neal (28)	Horace Grant (11)	Penny Hardaway (7)	Orlando Arena; 17,248	2–0
3	May 12	@ Atlanta	W 103–96	Shaquille O'Neal (24)	Shaquille O'Neal (12)	Penny Hardaway (6)	Omni Coliseum; 15,476	3–0
4	May 13	@ Atlanta	L 99–104	Grant, Hardaway (29)	Horace Grant (20)	Penny Hardaway (11)	Omni Coliseum; 12,645	3–1
5	May 15	Atlanta	W 96–88	Shaquille O'Neal (27)	Shaquille O'Neal (15)	O'Neal, Scott (4)	Orlando Arena; 17,248	4–1

Conference finals: 0–4 (home: 0–2; road: 0–2)

Game	Date	Team	Score	High points	High rebounds	High assists	Location Attendance	Series
1	May 19	@ Chicago	L 83–121	Penny Hardaway (38)	Shaquille O'Neal (6)	Shaquille O'Neal (6)	United Center; 24,411	0–1
2	May 21	@ Chicago	L 88–93	Shaquille O'Neal (36)	Shaquille O'Neal (16)	Brian Shaw (6)	United Center; 24,395	0–2
3	May 25	Chicago	L 67–86	Penny Hardaway (18)	Shaquille O'Neal (12)	Hardaway, O'Neal (3)	Orlando Arena; 17,248	0–3
4	May 27	Chicago	L 101–106	Hardaway, O'Neal (28)	Shaquille O'Neal (9)	Penny Hardaway (8)	Orlando Arena; 17,248	0–4

1996 schedule

== Player statistics ==
=== Regular season ===
Player	POS	GP	GS	MP	REB	AST	STL	BLK	PTS	MPG	RPG	APG	SPG	BPG	PPG
Dennis Scott	SF	82	82	3,041	309	243	90	29	1,431	37.1	3.8	3.0	1.1	.4	17.5
Penny Hardaway	PG	82	82	3,015	354	582	166	41	1,780	36.8	4.3	7.1	2.0	.5	21.7
Nick Anderson	SG	77	77	2,717	415	279	121	46	1,134	35.3	5.4	3.6	1.6	.6	14.7
Brian Shaw	PG	75	1	1,679	224	336	58	11	496	22.4	3.0	4.5	.8	.1	6.6
Anthony Bowie	SG	74	4	1,078	123	105	34	10	308	14.6	1.7	1.4	.5	.1	4.2
Jon Koncak	PF	67	35	1,288	272	51	27	44	203	19.2	4.1	.8	.4	.7	3.0
Donald Royal	SF	64	7	963	153	42	29	15	337	15.0	2.4	.7	.5	.2	5.3
Horace Grant	PF	63	62	2,286	580	170	62	74	847	36.3	9.2	2.7	1.0	1.2	13.4
Joe Wolf^{†}	PF	63	8	1,047	185	63	13	5	291	16.6	2.9	1.0	.2	.1	4.6
Shaquille O'Neal	C	54	52	1,946	596	155	34	115	1,434	36.0	11.0	2.9	.6	2.1	26.6
David Vaughn III	PF	33	0	266	80	8	6	15	64	8.1	2.4	.2	.2	.5	1.9
Brooks Thompson	PG	33	0	246	24	31	12	0	140	7.5	.7	.9	.4	.0	4.2
Jeff Turner	PF	13	0	192	28	6	2	1	47	14.8	2.2	.5	.2	.1	3.6
Darrell Armstrong	PG	13	0	41	2	5	6	0	42	3.2	.2	.4	.5	.0	3.2
Anthony Bonner	PF	4	0	43	19	4	3	0	13	10.8	4.8	1.0	.8	.0	3.3
Geert Hammink^{†}	C	3	0	7	3	0	0	0	4	2.3	1.0	.0	.0	.0	1.3

- ^{†} Denotes player spent time with another team in the season. Stats reflect time with the Magic only.

=== Playoffs ===
Player	POS	GP	GS	MP	REB	AST	STL	BLK	PTS	MPG	RPG	APG	SPG	BPG	PPG
Penny Hardaway	PG	12	12	473	56	72	20	4	280	39.4	4.7	6.0	1.7	.3	23.3
Shaquille O'Neal	C	12	12	459	120	55	9	15	310	38.3	10.0	4.6	.8	1.3	25.8
Dennis Scott	SF	12	12	446	43	23	9	1	136	37.2	3.6	1.9	.8	.1	11.3
Jon Koncak	PF	12	3	140	23	3	5	4	11	11.7	1.9	.3	.4	.3	.9
Anthony Bowie	SG	12	1	152	17	14	3	2	30	12.7	1.4	1.2	.3	.2	2.5
Nick Anderson	SG	11	11	418	55	21	21	5	156	38.0	5.0	1.9	1.9	.5	14.2
Joe Wolf	PF	11	0	85	6	2	1	0	20	7.7	.5	.2	.1	.0	1.8
Brian Shaw	PG	10	0	217	21	46	5	0	47	21.7	2.1	4.6	.5	.0	4.7
Horace Grant	PF	9	9	334	94	13	7	6	135	37.1	10.4	1.4	.8	.7	15.0
Donald Royal	SF	7	0	92	11	1	0	1	25	13.1	1.6	.1	.0	.1	3.6
Brooks Thompson	PG	5	0	48	5	7	0	1	26	9.6	1.0	1.4	.0	.2	5.2
Anthony Bonner	PF	4	0	16	2	1	0	0	3	4.0	.5	.3	.0	.0	.8

== Awards and honors ==
- Shaquille O'Neal – All-NBA 3rd team, All-Star
- Penny Hardaway – All-NBA 1st Team, Player of the Month (November), All-Star
- Horace Grant – All-Defensive 2nd Team
- Nick Anderson – Rich and Helen DeVos Community Enrichment Award

=== League records ===
During the 1995–96 season, Dennis Scott set the record for most three-point field goals scored in a regular season with 267.
