= 1995–96 Miami Heat season =

NBA professional basketball team season

- Head coach: Pat Riley
- President: Pat Riley
- General manager: Dave Wohl
- Owner: Micky Arison
- Arena: Miami Arena

Results
- Record: 42–40 (.512)
- Place: Division: 3rd (Atlantic); Conference: 8th (Eastern)
- Playoff finish: First round (lost to Bulls 0–3)
- Stats at Basketball Reference

Local media
- Television: WBFS-TV; Sunshine Network
- Radio: WINZ

The 1995–96 Miami Heat season was the eighth season for the Miami Heat in the National Basketball Association.

== Season summary ==
=== Off-season ===
The Heat received the tenth overall pick in the 1995 NBA draft, and selected power forward Kurt Thomas out of Texas Christian University. During the off-season, the team acquired Rex Chapman from the Washington Bullets, and hired Pat Riley as their new head coach and team president. On the first day of the regular season, which began on November 3, 1995, the Heat acquired All-Star center Alonzo Mourning from the Charlotte Hornets.

For the season, the Heat revealed new red alternate road uniforms, which featured a black and white trim, black and white striped side panels on the right side of their jerseys and shorts, and the team's primary logo on the left leg of their shorts; these uniforms would remain in use until 1999.

=== Regular season ===
Under Riley and with the addition of Mourning, Chapman and Thomas, the Heat won 11 of their first 14 games of the regular season, but then lost 23 of their next 34 games, holding a 22–26 at the All-Star break. Riley continued to make changes as he made three more deals at the trading deadline. The team traded Kevin Willis and Bimbo Coles to the Golden State Warriors in exchange for All-Star guard Tim Hardaway, and Chris Gatling, traded Billy Owens, and Kevin Gamble to the Sacramento Kings in exchange for Walt Williams, and Tyrone Corbin, and then dealt rookie point guard Terrence Rencher to the Phoenix Suns in exchange for Tony Smith. The team also signed free agents Jeff Malone, who was previously released by the Philadelphia 76ers, and rookie shooting guard Voshon Lenard, who previously played in the Continental Basketball Association.

With the addition of Hardaway, Gatling and Williams, the Heat played above .500 in winning percentage for the remainder of the regular season, winning 10 of their 14 games in March, and then winning five of their final seven games. The team finished in third place in the Atlantic Division with a 42–40 record, which earned them the eighth seed in the Eastern Conference, as they qualified for their third NBA playoff appearance.

Mourning averaged 23.2 points, 10.4 rebounds and 2.7 blocks per game, while Hardaway averaged 17.2 points, 10.0 assists and 2.1 steals per game in 28 games after the trade, and Gatling played a sixth man role off the bench, as he provided the team with 15.2 points and 7.3 rebounds per game in 24 games. In addition, Chapman contributed 14.0 points per game, and led the Heat with 125 three-point field goals, but only played 56 games due to an Achilles tendon injury, while rookie shooting guard Sasha Danilovic contributed 13.4 points per game, but only played just 19 games due to a wrist injury, Williams averaged 12.0 points per game in 28 games, Thomas provided with 9.0 points and 5.9 rebounds per game, and Keith Askins contributed 6.1 points and 4.3 rebounds per game.

During the NBA All-Star weekend at the Alamodome in San Antonio, Texas, Mourning was selected for the 1996 NBA All-Star Game, as a member of the Eastern Conference All-Star team, while Thomas was selected for the NBA Rookie Game, as a member of the Eastern Conference Rookie team. Mourning also finished in 14th place in Most Valuable Player voting, while Gatling finished tied in seventh place in Sixth Man of the Year voting.

The Heat finished 25th in the NBA in home-game attendance, with an attendance of 606,088 at the Miami Arena during the regular season, which was the fifth-lowest in the league.

=== NBA playoffs ===
In the Eastern Conference First Round of the 1996 NBA playoffs, the Heat faced off against the top–seeded, and Central Division champion Chicago Bulls, who were led by the trio of All-Star guard, and Most Valuable Player of the Year, Michael Jordan, All-Star forward Scottie Pippen, and rebound-specialist Dennis Rodman. The Heat lost the first two games to the Bulls on the road at the United Center, before losing Game 3 at home, 112–91 at the Miami Arena, thus losing the series in a three-game sweep.

The Bulls would defeat the Seattle SuperSonics in six games in the 1996 NBA Finals, winning their fourth NBA championship in six years.

=== Notable highlights ===
One notable highlight of the regular season occurred on February 23, 1996, in a home game against the Bulls at the Miami Arena. Due to the recent mid-season trades, the Heat only had eight players available, but managed to defeat the Bulls by a score of 113–104; Chapman scored 39 points and made 9 out of 10 three-point field-goal attempts, while Mourning posted a double-double of 19 points and 12 rebounds, and Lenard contributed 19 points off the bench. This was one of only ten losses that the Bulls suffered on their way to a then-record 72-win season.

=== Aftermath ===
Following the season, Chapman signed as a free agent with the Phoenix Suns, while Williams signed with the Toronto Raptors, Gatling signed with the Dallas Mavericks, Corbin signed with the Atlanta Hawks, Smith signed with the Charlotte Hornets, and Malone retired.

== Offseason ==
=== NBA draft ===
Round	Pick	Player	Position	Nationality	School/Club team
1	10	Kurt Thomas	PF/C	United States	TCU
2	46	George Banks	F	United States	UTEP

== Roster ==
1995–96 Miami Heat roster
Players

Pos.	No.	Player	Height	Weight	DOB	From
F	2	Keith Askins	6 ft 7 in (2.01 m)	197 lb (89 kg)	1967–12–15	Alabama
G	7	Rex Chapman	6 ft 4 in (1.93 m)	185 lb (84 kg)	1967–10–05	Kentucky
F	23	Tyrone Corbin	6 ft 6 in (1.98 m)	210 lb (95 kg)	1962–12–31	DePaul
G	5	Sasha Danilovic	6 ft 5 in (1.96 m)	200 lb (91 kg)	1970–02–26	Serbia
F	15	Chris Gatling	6 ft 10 in (2.08 m)	235 lb (107 kg)	1967–09–03	Old Dominion
G	10	Tim Hardaway	6 ft 0 in (1.83 m)	175 lb (79 kg)	1966–09–01	UTEP
C	21	Stacey King	6 ft 11 in (2.11 m)	230 lb (104 kg)	1967–01–29	Oklahoma
G	22	Voshon Lenard	6 ft 4 in (1.93 m)	205 lb (93 kg)	1973–05–14	Minnesota
G	25	Jeff Malone (injured)	6 ft 4 in (1.93 m)	205 lb (93 kg)	1961–06–28	Mississippi
C	33	Alonzo Mourning	6 ft 10 in (2.08 m)	240 lb (109 kg)	1970–02–08	Georgetown
C	24	Danny Schayes	6 ft 11 in (2.11 m)	235 lb (107 kg)	1959–05–10	Syracuse
G	14	Tony Smith	6 ft 3 in (1.91 m)	185 lb (84 kg)	1968–06–14	Marquette
F	40	Kurt Thomas	6 ft 9 in (2.06 m)	230 lb (104 kg)	1972–10–04	TCU
F	42	Walt Williams	6 ft 8 in (2.03 m)	219 lb (99 kg)	1970–04–16	Maryland

Coaches
Head coach
- Pat Riley
Assistant(s)
- Jeff Bzdelik
- Tony Fiorentino
- Bob McAdoo
- Scotty Robertson
- Stan Van Gundy

Legend
- (DP) Unsigned draft pick
- (FA) Free agent
- (S) Suspended
- Injured

Roster

== Regular season ==
=== Season standings ===
Atlantic Division	W	L	PCT	GB	Home	Road	Div	GP
y–Orlando Magic	60	22	.732	12.0	37‍–‍4	23‍–‍18	21–3	82
x–New York Knicks	47	35	.573	25.0	26‍–‍15	21‍–‍20	16–8	82
x–Miami Heat	42	40	.512	30.0	26‍–‍15	16‍–‍25	13–12	82
Washington Bullets	39	43	.476	33.0	25‍–‍16	14‍–‍27	10–14	82
Boston Celtics	33	49	.402	39.0	18‍–‍23	15‍–‍26	12–12	82
New Jersey Nets	30	52	.366	42.0	20‍–‍21	10‍–‍31	8–17	82
Philadelphia 76ers	18	64	.220	54.0	11‍–‍30	7‍–‍34	5–19	82

Eastern Conference
#	Team	W	L	PCT	GB	GP
1	z–Chicago Bulls	72	10	.878	–	82
2	y–Orlando Magic	60	22	.732	12.0	82
3	x–Indiana Pacers	52	30	.634	20.0	82
4	x–Cleveland Cavaliers	47	35	.573	25.0	82
5	x–New York Knicks	47	35	.573	25.0	82
6	x–Atlanta Hawks	46	36	.561	26.0	82
7	x–Detroit Pistons	46	36	.561	26.0	82
8	x–Miami Heat	42	40	.512	30.0	82
9	Charlotte Hornets	41	41	.500	31.0	82
10	Washington Bullets	39	43	.476	33.0	82
11	Boston Celtics	33	49	.402	39.0	82
12	New Jersey Nets	30	52	.366	42.0	82
13	Milwaukee Bucks	25	57	.305	47.0	82
14	Toronto Raptors	21	61	.256	51.0	82
15	Philadelphia 76ers	18	64	.220	54.0	82

=== Schedule ===
Game	Date	Opponent	Result	Heat points	Opponents	Record	Streak	OT
1	November 4	Cleveland	Win	85	71	1-0	Won 1	
2	November 8	Houston	Win	89	82	2-0	Won 2	
3	November 10	New Jersey	Win	106	80	3-0	Won 3	
4	November 11	@ Orlando	Loss	93	94	3-1	Lost 1	
5	November 15	Indiana	Loss	97	103	3-2	Lost 2	
6	November 17	@ Atlanta	Win	91	88	4-2	Won 1	
7	November 18	Orlando	Win	93	90	5-2	Won 2	
8	November 22	Golden State	Win	103	93	6-2	Won 3	
9	November 24	@ Washington	Loss	94	110	6-3	Lost 1	
10	November 25	Vancouver	Win	111	91	7-3	Won 1	
11	November 28	Dallas	Win	111	89	8-3	Won 2	
12	November 30	@ Detroit	Win	118	107	9-3	Won 3	
13	December 1	Charlotte	Win	108	101	10-3	Won 4	OT
14	December 3	@ Toronto	Win	112	94	11-3	Won 5	
15	December 4	@ Boston	Loss	120	121	11-4	Lost 1	2OT
16	December 6	Boston	Loss	101	105	11-5	Lost 2	
17	December 9	@ Phoenix	Win	94	92	12-5	Won 1	
18	December 10	@ Sacramento	Loss	90	110	12-6	Lost 1	
19	December 12	@ Golden State	Loss	80	105	12-7	Lost 2	
20	December 14	@ LA Clippers	Loss	84	89	12-8	Lost 3	
21	December 16	Utah	Loss	74	83	12-9	Lost 4	
22	December 19	@ New York	Loss	70	89	12-10	Lost 5	
23	December 20	@ New Jersey	Win	112	104	13-10	Won 1	OT
24	December 22	Detroit	Loss	75	84	13-11	Lost 1	
25	December 23	@ Charlotte	Loss	75	87	13-12	Lost 2	
26	December 26	New Jersey	Win	96	93	14-12	Won 1	
27	December 28	@ Indiana	Loss	77	91	14-13	Lost 1	
28	December 30	LA Clippers	Win	105	96	15-13	Won 1	
29	January 4	Seattle	Loss	81	84	15-14	Lost 1	
30	January 6	@ Denver	Win	88	86	16-14	Won 1	
31	January 8	@ Utah	Loss	92	94	16-15	Lost 1	
32	January 10	@ Portland	Loss	89	90	16-16	Lost 2	
33	January 12	@ Seattle	Loss	81	113	16-17	Lost 3	
34	January 13	@ Vancouver	Loss	65	69	16-18	Lost 4	
35	January 15	@ LA Lakers	Loss	88	96	16-19	Lost 5	
36	January 17	Washington	Win	96	89	17-19	Won 1	
37	January 19	Charlotte	Loss	106	114	17-20	Lost 1	
38	January 20	@ Atlanta	Loss	78	98	17-21	Lost 2	
39	January 22	San Antonio	Win	96	89	18-21	Won 1	
40	January 24	New York	Loss	79	88	18-22	Lost 1	
41	January 26	@ Chicago	Loss	80	102	18-23	Lost 2	
42	January 27	@ Cleveland	Win	102	85	19-23	Won 1	
43	January 29	@ New York	Loss	85	94	19-24	Lost 1	
44	January 30	Phoenix	Loss	99	114	19-25	Lost 2	
45	February 1	Philadelphia	Win	124	104	20-25	Won 1	
46	February 3	Boston	Loss	99	100	20-26	Lost 1	
47	February 5	Sacramento	Win	103	92	21-26	Won 1	
48	February 7	Atlanta	Win	101	89	22-26	Won 2	
49	February 13	Toronto	Loss	87	98	22-27	Lost 1	
50	February 15	Denver	Win	97	91	23-27	Won 1	
51	February 17	Orlando	Loss	93	95	23-28	Lost 1	
52	February 19	@ Cleveland	Loss	70	73	23-29	Lost 2	
53	February 21	@ Philadelphia	Win	66	57	24-29	Won 1	
54	February 23	Chicago	Win	113	104	25-29	Won 2	
55	February 25	Philadelphia	Win	108	101	26-29	Won 3	
56	February 27	@ New Jersey	Win	93	90	27-29	Won 4	
57	February 28	@ Orlando	Loss	112	116	27-30	Lost 1	
58	March 1	Portland	Loss	88	102	27-31	Lost 2	
59	March 3	@ Minnesota	Loss	87	89	27-32	Lost 3	
60	March 5	Minnesota	Win	113	72	28-32	Won 1	
61	March 8	Toronto	Win	109	79	29-32	Won 2	
62	March 10	Cleveland	Win	88	81	30-32	Won 3	
63	March 12	@ Dallas	Win	125	118	31-32	Won 4	
64	March 14	@ San Antonio	Loss	100	120	31-33	Lost 1	
65	March 16	@ Houston	Win	121	97	32-33	Won 1	
66	March 20	Detroit	Win	102	93	33-33	Won 2	
67	March 22	@ Milwaukee	Win	122	106	34-33	Won 3	
68	March 24	@ Boston	Win	111	95	35-33	Won 4	
69	March 27	LA Lakers	Loss	95	106	35-34	Lost 1	
70	March 29	Washington	Win	112	93	36-34	Won 1	
71	March 30	@ Detroit	Win	95	85	37-34	Won 2	
72	April 2	Chicago	Loss	92	110	37-35	Lost 1	
73	April 4	@ Chicago	Loss	92	100	37-36	Lost 2	
74	April 6	@ Indiana	Loss	95	99	37-37	Lost 3	
75	April 8	@ Washington	Loss	99	111	37-38	Lost 4	
76	April 10	@ Charlotte	Win	116	95	38-38	Won 1	
77	April 11	Milwaukee	Win	115	105	39-38	Won 2	
78	April 13	New York	Win	103	95	40-38	Won 3	
79	April 15	New Jersey	Win	110	90	41-38	Won 4	
80	April 17	@ Philadelphia	Loss	86	90	41-39	Lost 1	
81	April 19	@ Milwaukee	Win	106	100	42-39	Won 1	
82	April 21	Atlanta	Loss	92	104	42-40	Lost 1	

== Playoffs ==
1996 playoff game log
First round: 0–3 (home: 0–1; road: 0–2)

Game	Date	Team	Score	High points	High rebounds	High assists	Location Attendance	Series
1	April 26	@ Chicago	L 85–102	Tim Hardaway (30)	Chris Gatling (9)	Tim Hardaway (7)	United Center; 24,104	0–1
2	April 28	@ Chicago	L 75–106	Sasha Danilovic (15)	Chris Gatling (11)	Tim Hardaway (4)	United Center; 24,202	0–2
3	May 1	Chicago	L 91–112	Alonzo Mourning (30)	Mourning, Thomas (8)	Tim Hardaway (6)	Miami Arena; 15,200	0–3

1996 schedule

== Player statistics ==
=== Regular season ===
Player	POS	GP	GS	MP	REB	AST	STL	BLK	PTS	MPG	RPG	APG	SPG	BPG	PPG
Keith Askins	SF	75	14	1,897	324	121	48	61	458	25.3	4.3	1.6	.6	.8	6.1
Kurt Thomas	PF	74	42	1,655	439	46	47	36	666	22.4	5.9	.6	.6	.5	9.0
Alonzo Mourning	C	70	70	2,671	727	159	70	189	1,623	38.2	10.4	2.3	1.0	2.7	23.2
Rex Chapman	SG	56	50	1,865	145	166	45	10	786	33.3	2.6	3.0	.8	.2	14.0
Bimbo Coles^{†}	PG	52	52	1,882	201	296	63	12	664	36.2	3.9	5.7	1.2	.2	12.8
Kevin Willis^{†}	PF	47	42	1,357	420	34	19	25	479	28.9	8.9	.7	.4	.5	10.2
Kevin Gamble^{†}	SF	44	13	1,033	86	82	31	5	305	23.5	2.0	1.9	.7	.1	6.9
Billy Owens^{†}	SF	40	40	1,388	286	134	30	22	590	34.7	7.2	3.4	.8	.6	14.8
Pete Myers^{†}	SG	39	1	639	73	97	14	11	184	16.4	1.9	2.5	.4	.3	4.7
Terrence Rencher^{†}	PG	34	1	397	42	54	16	1	103	11.7	1.2	1.6	.5	.0	3.0
Danny Schayes	C	32	6	399	89	9	11	16	101	12.5	2.8	.3	.3	.5	3.2
Voshon Lenard	SG	30	0	323	52	31	6	1	176	10.8	1.7	1.0	.2	.0	5.9
Tim Hardaway^{†}	PG	28	28	1,047	98	280	58	6	482	37.4	3.5	10.0	2.1	.2	17.2
Walt Williams^{†}	SF	28	28	788	112	65	32	16	337	28.1	4.0	2.3	1.1	.6	12.0
Tony Smith^{†}	SG	25	1	410	39	68	16	5	109	16.4	1.6	2.7	.6	.2	4.4
Chris Gatling^{†}	PF	24	0	565	175	17	17	11	365	23.5	7.3	.7	.7	.5	15.2
Tyrone Corbin^{†}	SF	22	0	354	65	23	16	3	101	16.1	3.0	1.0	.7	.1	4.6
Predrag Danilović	SG	19	18	542	46	47	15	3	255	28.5	2.4	2.5	.8	.2	13.4
Ronnie Grandison^{†}	PF	18	3	235	36	10	8	1	43	13.1	2.0	.6	.4	.1	2.4
Stacey King	PF	15	0	156	23	2	7	2	38	10.4	1.5	.1	.5	.1	2.5
LeRon Ellis	C	12	1	74	8	4	2	3	13	6.2	.7	.3	.2	.3	1.1
Jeff Malone^{†}	SG	7	0	103	8	7	3	0	31	14.7	1.1	1.0	.4	.0	4.4

- ^{†} Denotes player spent time with another team in the season. Stats reflect time with the Heat only.

=== Playoffs ===
Player	POS	GP	GS	MP	REB	AST	STL	BLK	PTS	MPG	RPG	APG	SPG	BPG	PPG
Tim Hardaway	PG	3	3	110	5	17	3	0	53	36.7	1.7	5.7	1.0	.0	17.7
Alonzo Mourning	C	3	3	92	18	4	2	3	54	30.7	6.0	1.3	.7	1.0	18.0
Rex Chapman	SG	3	3	88	6	5	3	0	27	29.3	2.0	1.7	1.0	.0	9.0
Walt Williams	SF	3	3	70	12	5	1	1	14	23.3	4.0	1.7	.3	.3	4.7
Kurt Thomas	PF	3	3	60	16	3	2	1	12	20.0	5.3	1.0	.7	.3	4.0
Chris Gatling	PF	3	0	68	24	1	2	0	18	22.7	8.0	.3	.7	.0	6.0
Tony Smith	SG	3	0	61	4	8	4	0	22	20.3	1.3	2.7	1.3	.0	7.3
Predrag Danilović	SG	3	0	60	1	4	1	0	25	20.0	.3	1.3	.3	.0	8.3
Keith Askins	SF	3	0	48	8	2	1	0	13	16.0	2.7	.7	.3	.0	4.3
Tyrone Corbin	SF	2	0	34	7	1	2	0	5	17.0	3.5	.5	1.0	.0	2.5
Danny Schayes	C	2	0	17	4	0	0	0	7	8.5	2.0	.0	.0	.0	3.5
Stacey King	PF	1	0	12	3	1	0	0	1	12.0	3.0	1.0	.0	.0	1.0

== Transactions ==
July 1, 1995

- Released Brad Lohaus.
- Released Ledell Eackles.

September 1, 1995

- Traded a 1996 1st round draft pick (Walter McCarty) to the New York Knicks for Pat Riley (coach).

September 29, 1995

- Brad Lohaus signed as an unrestricted free agent with the San Antonio Spurs.

October 5, 1995

- Signed Ron Grandison as a free agent.
- Signed Stacey King as a free agent.
- Signed Bruce Bowen as a free agent.

October 13, 1995

- Waived Bruce Bowen.

November 3, 1995

- Traded Matt Geiger, Khalid Reeves, Glen Rice, and a 1996 1st round draft pick (Tony Delk) to the Charlotte Hornets for LeRon Ellis, Alonzo Mourning, and Pete Myers.

December 12, 1995

- Signed Danny Schayes to a contract for remainder of season.

December 27, 1995

- Waived LeRon Ellis.

December 29, 1995

- Signed Voshon Lenard as a free agent.

January 5, 1996

- Waived Ron Grandison.

February 12, 1996

- Signed Jeff Malone to a 10-day contract.
- Waived Pete Myers.

February 22, 1996

- Traded Bimbo Coles and Kevin Willis to the Golden State Warriors for Chris Gatling and Tim Hardaway.
- Traded Kevin Gamble and Billy Owens to the Sacramento Kings for Tyrone Corbin and Walt Williams.
- Traded Terrence Rencher to the Phoenix Suns for Tony Smith.

March 3, 1996

- Signed Jeff Malone to a contract for remainder of season.

June 26, 1996

- Traded a 2000 1st round draft pick (DeShawn Stevenson) to the Utah Jazz for Martin Müürsepp.

Player transactions citation:

== Postseason ==
The Heat would qualify for the playoffs by beating out the Charlotte Hornets by 1 game for the final playoff spot in the Eastern Conference with a record of 42 wins and 40 losses. In the playoffs, the Heat were swept in 3 straight games. The Heat would lose by double digits in each game to the eventual World Champion Chicago Bulls.

== Awards, records, and honors ==
Pat Riley led the Heat to a 42–40 record which tying the franchise record for best record. Alonzo Mourning was voted by fans to be in the All-Star Game.
