= 1995–96 New Jersey Nets season =

NBA professional basketball team season

- Head coach: Butch Beard
- Arena: Continental Airlines Arena

Results
- Record: 30–52 (.366)
- Place: Division: 6th (Atlantic); Conference: 12th (Eastern)
- Playoff finish: Did not qualify
- Stats at Basketball Reference

Local media
- Television: SportsChannel New York
- Radio: WQEW

The 1995–96 New Jersey Nets season was the Nets' 29th season in the National Basketball Association, and 20th season in East Rutherford, New Jersey.

== Season summary ==
=== Off-season ===
The Nets received the ninth overall pick in the 1995 NBA draft, and selected power forward and NCAA Final Four Most Valuable Player, Ed O'Bannon from the University of California, Los Angeles. During the off-season, the team signed free agent Vern Fleming.

=== Regular season ===
With the addition of O'Bannon and Fleming, the Nets struggled with a 4–8 start to the regular season, as Derrick Coleman missed the first month of the season due to an irregular heartbeat. In late November, the team traded Coleman along with Rex Walters, and Sean Higgins to the Philadelphia 76ers in exchange for Shawn Bradley, Greg Graham and Tim Perry. The Nets reached .500 in winning percentage with a 9–9 start to the season, but then lost eight of their next nine games. In January, the team traded Kenny Anderson to the Charlotte Hornets in exchange for Kendall Gill, and second-year guard Khalid Reeves. However, Gill only played just eleven games with the Nets due to a season-ending hand injury, while Kevin Edwards only played just 34 games due to a knee injury. The Nets held an 18–29 record at the All-Star break, and posted a five-game winning streak in February. However, the team posted a seven-game losing streak in April, and lost 12 of their final 14 games of the season, finishing in sixth place in the Atlantic Division with a 30–52 record, which was the same record as the previous season.

Armen Gilliam averaged 18.3 points and 9.1 rebounds per game, while Gill averaged 17.5 points and 2.0 steals per game after the trade, and second-year guard Chris Childs showed improvement, providing the team with 12.8 points and 7.0 assists per game. In addition, Bradley averaged 12.5 points, 7.9 rebounds and 3.7 blocks per game in 67 games, while P.J. Brown provided with 11.3 points and 6.9 rebounds per game, and Edwards contributed 11.6 points and 1.6 steals per game. Off the bench, Jayson Williams played an increased role as the team's sixth man, averaging 9.0 points and 10.0 rebounds per game, while Fleming provided with 7.7 points and 3.3 assists per game, O'Bannon contributed 6.2 points per game, and second-year center Yinka Dare averaged 2.8 points and 3.1 rebounds per game.

Williams finished in third place in Sixth Man of the Year voting, and Bradley and Childs both finished tied in eighth place in Most Improved Player voting, while Williams finished tied in 14th place. The Nets finished 23rd in the NBA in home-game attendance, with an attendance of 638,144 at the Brendan Byrne Arena during the regular season.

=== Aftermath ===
Following the season, head coach Butch Beard was fired after publicly criticizing his players, while Gilliam signed as a free agent with the Milwaukee Bucks, Childs signed with the New York Knicks, and Brown signed with the Miami Heat. Meanwhile, Rick Mahorn re-signed with his former team, the Detroit Pistons, Graham was traded to the Seattle SuperSonics, Perry was released to free agency, and Fleming retired.

== Draft picks ==
Round	Pick	Player	Position	Nationality	College
1	9	Ed O'Bannon	PF	United States	UCLA

== Roster ==
1995–96 New Jersey Nets roster
Players

Pos.	No.	Player	Height	Weight	DOB	From
C	45	Shawn Bradley	7 ft 6 in (2.29 m)	235 lb (107 kg)	1972-03-22	BYU
F	42	P. J. Brown	6 ft 11 in (2.11 m)	225 lb (102 kg)	1969-10-14	Louisiana Tech
G	1	Chris Childs	6 ft 3 in (1.91 m)	195 lb (88 kg)	1970-11-20	Boise State
C	33	Yinka Dare	7 ft 0 in (2.13 m)	265 lb (120 kg)	1972-10-10	George Washington
G	21	Kevin Edwards (injured)	6 ft 3 in (1.91 m)	190 lb (86 kg)	1965-10-30	DePaul
G	10	Vern Fleming	6 ft 5 in (1.96 m)	185 lb (84 kg)	1962-02-04	Georgia
G	13	Kendall Gill (injured)	6 ft 5 in (1.96 m)	195 lb (88 kg)	1968-05-25	Illinois
F	43	Armen Gilliam	6 ft 9 in (2.06 m)	230 lb (104 kg)	1964-05-28	UNLV
G	20	Greg Graham	6 ft 4 in (1.93 m)	174 lb (79 kg)	1970-11-26	Indiana
F	4	Rick Mahorn	6 ft 10 in (2.08 m)	240 lb (109 kg)	1958-09-21	Hampton
G/F	31	Ed O'Bannon	6 ft 8 in (2.03 m)	222 lb (101 kg)	1972-08-14	UCLA
F	34	Tim Perry (injured)	6 ft 9 in (2.06 m)	200 lb (91 kg)	1965-06-04	Temple
G	6	Khalid Reeves	6 ft 3 in (1.91 m)	199 lb (90 kg)	1972-07-15	Arizona
C	41	Robert Werdann	6 ft 11 in (2.11 m)	250 lb (113 kg)	1970-09-12	St. John's
F	55	Jayson Williams	6 ft 9 in (2.06 m)	240 lb (109 kg)	1968-02-22	St. John's

Coaches
Head coach
- Butch Beard
Assistant(s)
- Stan Albeck
- Jerry Eaves
- Clifford Ray

Legend
- (DP) Unsigned draft pick
- (FA) Free agent
- (S) Suspended
- Injured

Roster

Roster notes

- Center Shawn Bradley holds American and German dual citizenship. He was born in Germany and raised in the U.S., but represented Germany internationally.

== Regular season ==
=== Season standings ===
Atlantic Division	W	L	PCT	GB	Home	Road	Div	GP
y–Orlando Magic	60	22	.732	12.0	37‍–‍4	23‍–‍18	21–3	82
x–New York Knicks	47	35	.573	25.0	26‍–‍15	21‍–‍20	16–8	82
x–Miami Heat	42	40	.512	30.0	26‍–‍15	16‍–‍25	13–12	82
Washington Bullets	39	43	.476	33.0	25‍–‍16	14‍–‍27	10–14	82
Boston Celtics	33	49	.402	39.0	18‍–‍23	15‍–‍26	12–12	82
New Jersey Nets	30	52	.366	42.0	20‍–‍21	10‍–‍31	8–17	82
Philadelphia 76ers	18	64	.220	54.0	11‍–‍30	7‍–‍34	5–19	82

Eastern Conference
#	Team	W	L	PCT	GB	GP
1	z–Chicago Bulls	72	10	.878	–	82
2	y–Orlando Magic	60	22	.732	12.0	82
3	x–Indiana Pacers	52	30	.634	20.0	82
4	x–Cleveland Cavaliers	47	35	.573	25.0	82
5	x–New York Knicks	47	35	.573	25.0	82
6	x–Atlanta Hawks	46	36	.561	26.0	82
7	x–Detroit Pistons	46	36	.561	26.0	82
8	x–Miami Heat	42	40	.512	30.0	82
9	Charlotte Hornets	41	41	.500	31.0	82
10	Washington Bullets	39	43	.476	33.0	82
11	Boston Celtics	33	49	.402	39.0	82
12	New Jersey Nets	30	52	.366	42.0	82
13	Milwaukee Bucks	25	57	.305	47.0	82
14	Toronto Raptors	21	61	.256	51.0	82
15	Philadelphia 76ers	18	64	.220	54.0	82

z – clinched division title
y – clinched division title
x – clinched playoff spot

=== Game log ===
1995–96 game log

Total: 30–52 (Home: 20–21; Road: 10–31)

November: 1–3 (home: 1–0; road: 0–3)

Game	Date	Team	Score	High points	High rebounds	High assists	Location Attendance	Record
1	November 3	@ Toronto	L 79–94	Anderson & Gilliam (13)	Armen Gilliam (16)	Kenny Anderson (8)	SkyDome; 33,306	0–1
2	November 7	Portland	W 104–84	Armen Gilliam (16)	Jayson Williams (16)	Kenny Anderson (10)	Brendan Byrne Arena; 16,152	1–1
3	November 8	@ Orlando	L 122–130 (3OT)	Armen Gilliam (20)	P. J. Brown (12)	Kenny Anderson (7)	Brendan Byrne Arena; 16,152	1–2
4	November 10	@ Miami	L 80–106	Childs & Gilliam (12)	Armen Gilliam (11)	Chris Childs (6)	Brendan Byrne Arena; 16,152	1–2

1995–96 season schedule

== Player statistics ==
Legend
GP	Games played	GS	Games started	MPG	Minutes per game
FG%	Field-goal percentage	3P%	3-point field-goal percentage	FT%	Free-throw percentage
RPG	Rebounds per game	APG	Assists per game	SPG	Steals per game
BPG	Blocks per game	PPG	Points per game

=== Regular season ===
Player	GP	GS	MPG	FG%	3P%	FT%	RPG	APG	SPG	BPG	PPG
Armen Gilliam	78	76	36.6	.474	.000	.791	9.1	1.8	0.9	0.7	18.3
Kendall Gill	11	10	38.0	.441	.360	.831	3.9	3.2	2.0	0.2	17.5
Kenny Anderson	31	28	33.6	.376	.364	.803	3.3	8.0	1.7	0.3	15.3
Chris Childs	78	54	30.9	.416	.367	.852	3.1	7.0	1.4	0.1	12.8
Shawn Bradley	67	57	29.8	.443	.250	.679	7.9	0.8	0.6	3.7	12.5
Kevin Edwards	34	33	29.6	.364	.404	.810	2.2	2.1	1.6	0.2	11.6
P.J. Brown	81	81	36.3	.444	.200	.770	6.9	2.0	1.0	1.2	11.3
Jayson Williams	80	6	23.2	.423	.286	.592	10.0	0.6	0.4	0.7	9.0
Vern Fleming	77	3	22.7	.433	.107	.751	2.2	3.3	0.5	0.1	7.7
Ed O'Bannon	64	29	19.6	.390	.179	.713	2.6	1.0	0.7	0.2	6.2
Greg Graham	45	2	10.8	.379	.368	.725	0.9	0.9	0.4	0.0	4.1
Khalid Reeves	31	7	13.4	.376	.309	.581	1.3	1.5	0.7	0.1	3.8
Rex Walters	11	0	7.9	.364	.250	1.000	0.6	1.0	0.3	0.0	3.0
Robert Werdann	13	0	7.2	.500		.538	1.8	0.2	0.4	0.2	3.0
Yinka Dare	58	23	10.8	.438		.613	3.1	0.0	0.1	0.7	2.8
Rick Mahorn	50	0	9.0	.352	.000	.723	2.2	0.3	0.3	0.3	2.4
Tim Perry	22	1	7.6	.489	.429	.500	1.6	0.3	0.1	0.5	2.4
Gerald Glass	10	0	5.6	.357	.200		0.6	0.4	0.2	0.1	2.1

Player statistics citation:

== See also ==
- 1995–96 NBA season
