= Michael Curry (basketball) =

American basketball player and coach (born 1968)

Personal information
- Born: August 22, 1968 (age 58) Anniston, Alabama, U.S.
- Listed height: 6 ft 5 in (1.96 m)
- Listed weight: 210 lb (95 kg)

Career information
- High school: Glenn Hills (Augusta, Georgia)
- College: Georgia Southern (1986–1990)
- NBA draft: 1990: undrafted
- Playing career: 1990–2005
- Position: Shooting guard / small forward
- Number: 12, 20, 34
- Coaching career: 2007–present

Career history

Playing
- 1990–1991: Steiner Bayreuth
- 1992–1993: Capital Region Pontiacs
- 1992: Long Island Surf
- 1993–1994: Philadelphia 76ers
- 1994: Clear Cantù
- 1994–1995: Valvi Girona
- 1995: Omaha Racers
- 1996: Washington Bullets
- 1996–1997: Detroit Pistons
- 1997–1999: Milwaukee Bucks
- 1999–2003: Detroit Pistons
- 2003–2004: Toronto Raptors
- 2004–2005: Indiana Pacers

Coaching
- 2007–2008: Detroit Pistons (assistant)
- 2008–2009: Detroit Pistons
- 2010–2013: Philadelphia 76ers (assistant)
- 2014–2018: Florida Atlantic
- 2020–2021: Georgia (player development assistant)
- 2021–2024: Vanderbilt (assistant)

Career highlights
- First-team All-TAAC (1990)

Career NBA statistics
- Points: 2,986 (4.5 ppg)
- Rebounds: 1,045 (1.6 rpg)
- Assists: 804 (1.2 apg)
- Stats at NBA.com
- Stats at Basketball Reference

Michael Edward Curry (born August 22, 1968) is an American professional basketball coach and former player. He was most recently an assistant coach for the Vanderbilt Commodores. Curry played in the National Basketball Association (NBA) from 1993 to 2005. He later served as head coach of the Detroit Pistons.

== College career ==
A 6'5" swingman from Glenn Hills High School in Augusta, Georgia, Curry played four seasons at Georgia Southern University. With the Eagles, he averaged 9.4 points, 5.4 rebounds, and 1.8 assists over his four-year collegiate career.

The Eagles performed well during Curry's tenure with the team, winning the Trans America Athletic Conference (TAAC) tournament championship and qualifying for the 1987 NCAA tournament in Curry's freshman year at Georgia Southern.

Curry's best season with the Eagles came in his senior year when he averaged 16.6 points per game and was named to the 1989–90 All-TAAC team.

== Professional career ==
Curry played eleven seasons (1993–1994 through 2004–2005) in the National Basketball Association (NBA) as a member of the Philadelphia 76ers, the Washington Bullets, the Detroit Pistons, the Milwaukee Bucks, the Toronto Raptors and the Indiana Pacers. Though he never averaged more than 6.6 points per game in a season, Curry was well respected throughout the league for his strong defense and leadership qualities, and for several years he served as president of the NBA Players Association.

In 1992, Curry was a guard/forward for the Long Island Surf of the United States Basketball League (USBL), averaging 20 points per game. As of November 2000, he was one of 128 USBL players who had graduated to the NBA.

Internationally, Curry played in the German 1st basketball league for Steiner Bayreuth (1990–1991), in Italy for Clear Cantù (1994) and in the Spanish ACB for Valvi Girona (1994–1995).

== NBA career statistics ==
Legend
GP	Games played	GS	Games started	MPG	Minutes per game
FG%	Field goal percentage	3P%	3-point field goal percentage	FT%	Free throw percentage
RPG	Rebounds per game	APG	Assists per game	SPG	Steals per game
BPG	Blocks per game	PPG	Points per game	**Bold**	Career high
*	Led the league

=== Regular season ===
Year	Team	GP	GS	MPG	FG%	3P%	FT%	RPG	APG	SPG	BPG	PPG
1993–94	Philadelphia	10	0	4.3	.214	.000	.750	0.1	0.1	0.1	0.0	0.9
1995–96	Washington	5	0	6.8	.300	.000	**1.000**	1.0	0.2	0.2	0.0	2.0
1995–96	Detroit	41	1	18.3	.464	.400	.707	2.0	0.6	0.6	0.0	4.9
1996–97	Detroit	81	2	15.0	.448	.299	.898	1.5	0.5	0.4	0.1	3.9
1997–98	Milwaukee	**82***	27	**24.1**	.469	**.444**	.835	1.2	1.7	0.7	**0.2**	**6.6**
1998–99	Milwaukee	50*	4	22.9	.437	.067	.797	**2.2**	1.6	**0.8**	0.1	4.9
1999–00	Detroit	**82**	3	19.6	**.480**	.200	.839	1.3	1.1	0.4	0.1	6.2
2000–01	Detroit	68	58	21.8	.455	**.444**	.849	1.8	**1.9**	0.4	0.0	5.2
2001–02	Detroit	**82**	75	23.3	.453	.269	.791	2.0	1.5	0.6	0.1	4.0
2002–03	Detroit	78	**77**	19.9	.402	.296	.800	1.6	1.3	0.6	0.1	3.0
2003–04	Toronto	70	15	17.6	.388	.200	.845	1.2	0.8	0.3	0.1	2.9
2004–05	Indiana	18	7	13.8	.448	.000	.500	1.5	0.8	0.3	**0.2**	1.7
Career		667	269	19.8	.447	.298	.825	1.6	1.2	0.5	0.1	4.5

=== Playoffs ===
Year	Team	GP	GS	MPG	FG%	3P%	FT%	RPG	APG	SPG	BPG	PPG
1995–96	Detroit	3	0	14.3	.429	.000	.000	1.0	0.3	0.3	**0.3**	2.0
1996–97	Detroit	2	0	3.5	.500	.000	.000	0.5	0.0	0.0	0.0	1.0
1998–99	Milwaukee	3	0	19.7	**.583**	.000	**1.000**	1.3	1.0	**0.7**	**0.3**	6.7
1999–00	Detroit	3	1	**26.3**	.522	.000	.667	1.0	1.0	0.3	**0.3**	**9.3**
2001–02	Detroit	10	10	22.1	.564	**.385**	.727	**1.4**	**1.2**	0.4	0.0	5.7
2002–03	Detroit	**15**	**14**	18.3	.364	.333	.857	1.1	1.1	0.5	0.1	2.7
Career		36	25	19.0	.480	.333	.774	1.1	1.0	0.4	0.1	4.3

== Coaching career ==
On June 10, 2008, Curry was named as the head coach of the Detroit Pistons for the 2008–09 season, succeeding Flip Saunders. He received a three-year deal, worth $2.5 million per season. On June 30, 2009, Curry was fired as head coach. Prior to becoming head coach of the Pistons, Curry served as an assistant coach for Detroit and also as the NBA's Vice-President of Player Development.

Curry later worked as the associate head coach for the Philadelphia 76ers.

On April 7, 2014, Curry accepted a job at Florida Atlantic University, replacing Mike Jarvis. In four seasons, the Owls were 39–84 under Curry, who was fired from FAU on March 16, 2018, and replaced by Dusty May.

== Head coaching record ==
=== NBA ===
Legend
Regular season	G	Games coached	W	Games won	L	Games lost	W–L %	Win–loss %
Playoffs	PG	Playoff games	PW	Playoff wins	PL	Playoff losses	PW–L %	Playoff win–loss %

Team	Year	G	W	L	W–L%	Finish	PG	PW	PL	PW–L%	Result
Detroit	2008–09	82	39	43	.476	3rd in Central	4	0	4	.000	Lost in First round
Career		82	39	43	.476		4	0	4	.000	

=== College ===
Record table
Season	Team	Overall	Conference	Standing	Postseason
Florida Atlantic Owls (Conference USA) (2014–2018)
2014–15	Florida Atlantic	9–20	2–16	14th	
2015–16	Florida Atlantic	8–25	5–13	T–12th	
2016–17	Florida Atlantic	10–20	6–12	T–11th	
2017–18	Florida Atlantic	12–19	6–12	T–11th	
Florida Atlantic:		39–84 (.317)	19–53 (.264)		
Total:		39–84 (.317)			
National champion Postseason invitational champion Conference regular season champion Conference regular season and conference tournament champion Division regular season champion Division regular season and conference tournament champion Conference tournament champion

== Personal life ==
His son, Deon Curry, played football as a wide receiver for Michigan State University.
