= 1995–96 Detroit Pistons season =

NBA team season

- Head coach: Doug Collins
- General manager: Rick Sund
- Owner: Bill Davidson
- Arena: The Palace of Auburn Hills

Results
- Record: 46–36 (.561)
- Place: Division: 5th (Central); Conference: 7th (Eastern)
- Playoff finish: First round (lost to Magic 0–3)
- Stats at Basketball Reference

Local media
- Television: WKBD-TV (George Blaha, Kelly Tripucka); PASS Sports (Fred McLeod, Greg Kelser)
- Radio: WWJ (George Blaha)

The 1995–96 Detroit Pistons season was the 48th season for the Detroit Pistons in the National Basketball Association, and their 39th season in Detroit, Michigan.

== Season summary ==
=== Off-season ===
The Pistons had the 18th overall pick in the 1995 NBA draft, and selected center Theo Ratliff from the University of Wyoming, and also selected power forward Don Reid out of Georgetown University with the 58th overall pick. During the off-season, the team hired Doug Collins as their new head coach, and acquired Otis Thorpe from the Portland Trail Blazers; Thorpe won an NBA championship as a member of the Houston Rockets in the 1994 NBA Finals.

=== Regular season ===
Under Collins, and with the addition of Thorpe, Ratliff and Reid, the Pistons struggled with a 5–9 record in November, but played above .500 in winning percentage for the remainder of the regular season, holding a 23–22 record at the All-Star break. At mid-season, the team signed free agent Michael Curry, who was previously released by the Washington Bullets. The Pistons reemerged as a playoff contender, finishing in fifth place in the Central Division with a 46–36 record, earning the seventh seed in the Eastern Conference, and returning to the NBA playoffs after a three-year absence.

Second-year star Grant Hill averaged 20.2 points, 9.8 rebounds, 6.9 assists and 1.3 steals per game, and was named to the All-NBA Second Team, while Allan Houston averaged 19.7 points per game, and led the Pistons with 191 three-point field goals, and Thorpe provided the team with 14.2 points and 8.4 rebounds per game. In addition, Joe Dumars played half of the regular season off the bench as the team's sixth man, and contributed 11.8 points and 4.0 assists per game, along with 121 three-point field goals, as Lindsey Hunter was the team's starting point guard for half the season, averaging 8.5 points and 2.4 assists per game, along with 117 three-point field goals, and Terry Mills provided with 9.4 points and 4.3 rebounds per game off the bench. On the defensive side, Curry contributed 4.9 points per game in 41 games, while Ratliff averaged 4.5 points, 4.0 rebounds and 1.5 blocks per game, and Reid was the team's starting power forward, averaging 3.8 points and 2.9 rebounds per game.

During the NBA All-Star weekend at the Alamodome in San Antonio, Texas, Hill was selected for the 1996 NBA All-Star Game, as a member of the Eastern Conference All-Star team. Hill also finished tied in ninth place in Most Valuable Player voting, while Houston finished tied in eighth place in Most Improved Player voting, and Collins finished tied in third place in Coach of the Year voting.

The Pistons finished tenth in the NBA in home-game attendance, with an attendance of 730,573 at The Palace of Auburn Hills during the regular season.

=== NBA playoffs ===
In the Eastern Conference First Round of the 1996 NBA playoffs, the Pistons faced off against the 2nd–seeded, and Atlantic Division champion Orlando Magic, who were led by the trio of All-Star center Shaquille O'Neal, All-Star guard Penny Hardaway, and Horace Grant. The Pistons lost the first two games to the Magic on the road at the Orlando Arena, before losing Game 3 at home, 101–98 at The Palace of Auburn Hills, thus losing the series in a three-game sweep.

=== Notable incidents ===
One notable incident of the regular season occurred on March 19, 1996, during a road game against the Magic at the Orlando Arena. With the Magic up by 20 points against the Pistons, Magic reverse guard Anthony Bowie called a timeout with 2.7 seconds left to set up a play, so he could get his first career triple-double. Collins got upset and viewed this as poor sportsmanship, as he instructed his players off the court to not defend the final play, and then towards the locker room before the game had ended; Collins was fined $5,000 by the league. Bowie posted his first ever career triple-double of 20 points, 10 rebounds and 10 assists, as the Magic defeated the Pistons by a score of 113–91.

=== Aftermath ===
Following the season, Houston signed as a free agent with the New York Knicks, which left a bitter feud between Houston and Hill's relationship, and Mark West signed with the Cleveland Cavaliers.

== Draft picks ==
Round	Pick	Player	Position	Nationality	College
1	18	Theo Ratliff	C/PF	United States	Wyoming
1	19	Randolph Childress	PG	United States	Wake Forest
2	30	Lou Roe	PF	United States	Massachusetts Amherst
2	58	Don Reid	PF	United States	Georgetown

== Roster ==
1995–96 Detroit Pistons roster
Players

Pos.	No.	Player	Height	Weight	DOB	From
G	25	Steve Bardo	6 ft 5 in (1.96 m)	190 lb (86 kg)	1968–04–05	Illinois
G	34	Michael Curry	6 ft 5 in (1.96 m)	210 lb (95 kg)	1968–08–22	Georgia Southern
G	4	Joe Dumars	6 ft 3 in (1.91 m)	190 lb (86 kg)	1963–05–24	McNeese State
F	33	Grant Hill	6 ft 8 in (2.03 m)	225 lb (102 kg)	1972–10–05	Duke
G	20	Allan Houston	6 ft 6 in (1.98 m)	200 lb (91 kg)	1971–04–20	Tennessee
G	1	Lindsey Hunter	6 ft 2 in (1.88 m)	170 lb (77 kg)	1970–12–03	Jackson State
C	45	Eric Leckner	6 ft 11 in (2.11 m)	265 lb (120 kg)	1966–05–27	Wyoming
G	2	Mark Macon	6 ft 4 in (1.93 m)	185 lb (84 kg)	1969–04–14	Temple
F	6	Terry Mills	6 ft 10 in (2.08 m)	230 lb (104 kg)	1967–12–21	Michigan
C	42	Theo Ratliff	6 ft 10 in (2.08 m)	225 lb (102 kg)	1973–04–17	Wyoming
F	52	Don Reid	6 ft 8 in (2.03 m)	250 lb (113 kg)	1973–12–30	Georgetown
F	3	Lou Roe	6 ft 7 in (2.01 m)	220 lb (100 kg)	1972–07–14	UMass
F/C	50	Otis Thorpe	6 ft 9 in (2.06 m)	225 lb (102 kg)	1962–08–05	Providence
C	41	Mark West	6 ft 10 in (2.08 m)	230 lb (104 kg)	1960–11–05	Old Dominion

Coaches
Head coach
- Doug Collins
Assistant(s)
- Alvin Gentry
- Brian James
- Mike Abdenour (trainer)

Legend
- (DP) Unsigned draft pick
- (FA) Free agent
- (S) Suspended
- Injured

Roster
Updated: February 22, 1996

== Regular season ==
=== Season standings ===
Central Division	W	L	PCT	GB	Home	Road	Div	GP
z–Chicago Bulls	72	10	.878	–	39‍–‍2	33‍–‍8	24–4	82
x–Indiana Pacers	52	30	.634	20.0	32‍–‍9	20‍–‍21	19–9	82
x–Cleveland Cavaliers	47	35	.573	25.0	26‍–‍15	21‍–‍20	13–15	82
x–Atlanta Hawks	46	36	.561	26.0	26‍–‍15	20‍–‍21	15–13	82
x–Detroit Pistons	46	36	.561	26.0	30‍–‍11	16‍–‍25	15–13	82
Charlotte Hornets	41	41	.500	31.0	25‍–‍16	16‍–‍25	13–15	82
Milwaukee Bucks	25	57	.305	47.0	14‍–‍27	11‍–‍30	8–20	82
Toronto Raptors	21	61	.256	51.0	15‍–‍26	6‍–‍35	5–23	82

Eastern Conference
#	Team	W	L	PCT	GB	GP
1	z–Chicago Bulls	72	10	.878	–	82
2	y–Orlando Magic	60	22	.732	12.0	82
3	x–Indiana Pacers	52	30	.634	20.0	82
4	x–Cleveland Cavaliers	47	35	.573	25.0	82
5	x–New York Knicks	47	35	.573	25.0	82
6	x–Atlanta Hawks	46	36	.561	26.0	82
7	x–Detroit Pistons	46	36	.561	26.0	82
8	x–Miami Heat	42	40	.512	30.0	82
9	Charlotte Hornets	41	41	.500	31.0	82
10	Washington Bullets	39	43	.476	33.0	82
11	Boston Celtics	33	49	.402	39.0	82
12	New Jersey Nets	30	52	.366	42.0	82
13	Milwaukee Bucks	25	57	.305	47.0	82
14	Toronto Raptors	21	61	.256	51.0	82
15	Philadelphia 76ers	18	64	.220	54.0	82

z – clinched division title
y – clinched division title
x – clinched playoff spot

== Game log ==
=== Regular season ===
1995–96 game log
Total: 46-36 (Home: 30–11; Road: 16–25)
November: 5–9 (home: 5–4; road: 0–5)

Game	Date	Team	Score	High points	High rebounds	High assists	Location Attendance	Record
1	November 3	New York	L 100–106	Grant Hill (29)	Otis Thorpe, Terry Mills (12)	Grant Hill (4)	The Palace Of Auburn Hills; 21,454	0–1
2	November 4	@ Washington	L 89–100	Grant Hill (27)	Otis Thorpe (12)	Grant Hill (6)	USAir Arena; 18,756	0–2
3	November 7	@ Charlotte	L 96–108	Otis Thorpe (24)	Grant Hill (12)	Lindsey Hunter (10)	Charlotte Coliseum; 24,042	0–3
4	November 8	Portland	W 107–100 (OT)	Joe Dumars (41)	Otis Thorpe (10)	Lindsey Hunter (8)	The Palace Of Auburn Hills; 14,369	1–3
5	November 10	Cleveland	W 100–80	Grant Hill (28)	Grant Hill (15)	Allan Houston (5)	The Palace Of Auburn Hills; 16,489	2–3
6	November 15	Seattle	W 94–87	Otis Thorpe (27)	Theo Ratliff (15)	Grant Hill, Joe Dumars (7)	The Palace Of Auburn Hills; 14,732	3–3
7	November 17	Utah	L 81–86	Allan Houston (25)	Otis Thorpe (12)	Otis Thorpe, Grant Hill, Allan Houston (4)	The Palace Of Auburn Hills; 15,739	3–4
8	November 18	@ Cleveland	L 90–93	Grant Hill (24)	Otis Thorpe (8)	Grant Hill (5)	Gund Arena; 17,043	3–5
9	November 22	Washington	L 97–98	Grant Hill (35)	Grant Hill, Otis Thorpe, Theo Ratliff (8)	Grant Hill (7)	The Palace Of Auburn Hills; 15,628	3–6
10	November 24	Philadelphia	W 101–78	Allan Houston (23)	Grant Hill (10)	Grant Hill (6)	The Palace Of Auburn Hills; 16,960	4–6
11	November 26	Houston	W 102–100	Allan Houston (35)	Otis Thorpe (11)	Grant Hill (8)	The Palace Of Auburn Hills; 16,098	5–6
12	November 27	@ Orlando	L 95–96	Allan Houston, Terry Mills (19)	Terry Mills (10)	Grant Hill (8)	Orlando Arena; 17,248	5–7
13	November 29	@ Boston	L 96–100	Allan Houston (31)	Grant Hill (14)	Grant Hill, Steve Bardo (3)	FleetCenter; 17,163	5–8
14	November 30	Miami	L 107–118	Grant Hill (33)	Grant Hill (11)	Grant Hill (7)	The Palace Of Auburn Hills; 14,520	5–9

December: 10–5 (home: 6–2; road: 4–3)

Game	Date	Team	Score	High points	High rebounds	High assists	Location Attendance	Record
15	December 2	Atlanta	W 104–96	Grant Hill (24)	Grant Hill (13)	Grant Hill (11)	The Palace Of Auburn Hills; 15,580	6–9
16	December 4	@ Denver	L 82–85	Grant Hill (23)	Otis Thorpe (7)	Otis Thorpe (5)	McNichols Sports Arena; 15,116	6–10
17	December 7	@ Vancouver	W 93–84	Allan Houston (20)	Grant Hill (12)	Joe Dumars (9)	General Motors Place; 14,685	7–10
18	December 8	@ Golden State	W 121–114 (OT)	Grant Hill (26)	Grant Hill (8)	Joe Dumars (7)	Oakland-Alameda County Coliseum Arena; 15,025	8–10
19	December 10	@ L.A. Lakers	L 82–87	Lindsey Hunter (21)	Otis Thorpe (10)	Grant Hill (4)	Great Western Forum; 16,176	8–11
20	December 13	L.A. Lakers	L 98–101	Grant Hill (25)	Grant Hill (8)	Grant Hill (9)	The Palace Of Auburn Hills; 14,579	8–12
21	December 15	New Jersey	W 105–98	Allan Houston (22)	Grant Hill (10)	Grant Hill (12)	The Palace Of Auburn Hills; 15,483	9–12
22	December 16	@ New York	L 82–86	Grant Hill (18)	Otis Thorpe (11)	Grant Hill (4)	Madison Square Garden; 19,763	9–13
23	December 19	@ Toronto	W 94–82	Grant Hill (26)	Grant Hill (11)	Lindsey Hunter (6)	SkyDome; 21,128	10–13
24	December 20	Milwaukee	W 102–77	Allan Houston (29)	Otis Thorpe (9)	Grant Hill (7)	The Palace Of Auburn Hills; 14,688	11–13
25	December 22	@ Miami	W 84–75	Grant Hill (24)	Otis Thorpe (10)	Grant Hill (5)	Miami Arena; 14,688	12–13
26	December 23	Orlando	L 79–94	Allan Houston (19)	Grant Hill (7)	Grant Hill (7)	The Palace Of Auburn Hills; 19,795	12–14
27	December 26	Golden State	W 100–90	Otis Thorpe (26)	Otis Thorpe (11)	Lindsey Hunter (8)	The Palace Of Auburn Hills; 16,666	13–14
28	December 28	Toronto	W 113–91	Allan Houston (29)	Grant Hill (10)	Grant Hill (11)	The Palace Of Auburn Hills; 21,454	14–14
29	December 30	Charlotte	W 102–100 (OT)	Grant Hill (28)	Grant Hill, Otis Thorpe (12)	Grant Hill, Otis Thorpe (6)	The Palace Of Auburn Hills; 17,346	15–14

January: 6–6 (home: 2–1; road: 4–5)

Game	Date	Team	Score	High points	High rebounds	High assists	Location Attendance	Record
30	January 3	@ Milwaukee	L 82–96	Allan Houston (17)	Otis Thorpe (12)	Grant Hill (8)	Bradley Center; 14,081	15–15
31	January 6	Washington	W 90–82	Grant Hill, Allan Houston (25)	Otis Thorpe (13)	Grant Hill (7)	The Palace Of Auburn Hills; 21,454	16–15
32	January 11	@ Charlotte	W 95–93	Allan Houston (26)	Grant Hill (12)	Grant Hill (7)	Charlotte Coliseum; 24,042	17–15
33	January 13	@ New Jersey	W 91–80	Grant Hill (26)	Grant Hill (13)	Grant Hill (13)	Brendan Byrne Arena; 17,381	18–15
34	January 15	@ Atlanta	L 88–96	Grant Hill (21)	Don Reid, Otis Thorpe (8)	Grant Hill (7)	Omni Coliseum; 12,570	18–16
35	January 18	San Antonio	W 100–98	Allan Houston (28)	Otis Thorpe (12)	Grant Hill, Allan Houston (8)	The Palace Of Auburn Hills; 20,112	19–16
36	January 19	@ Indiana	L 81–89	Allan Houston (28)	Otis Thorpe (12)	Grant Hill, Allan Houston (8)	Market Square Arena; 16,651	19–17
37	January 21	Chicago	L 96–111	Grant Hill (24)	Grant Hill, Otis Thorpe (9)	Grant Hill, Lindsey Hunter (6)	The Palace Of Auburn Hills; 21,454	19–18
38	January 24	@ San Antonio	W 85–84	Grant Hill (21)	Grant Hill (13)	Grant Hill (7)	Alamodome; 13,609	20–18
39	January 25	@ Dallas	W 93–92	Terry Mills (24)	Terry Mills (9)	Grant Hill (8)	Reunion Arena; 16,504	21–18
40	January 27	@ Houston	L 85–105	Grant Hill (26)	Grant Hill (12)	Lindsey Hunter (5)	The Summit; 16,285	21–19
41	January 29	@ Utah	L 97–106	Grant Hill (34)	Otis Thorpe (8)	Grant Hill (8)	Delta Center; 19,911	21–20

February: 7–6 (home: 4–3; road: 3–3)

Game	Date	Team	Score	High points	High rebounds	High assists	Location Attendance	Record
42	February 1	Indiana	W 87–70	Otis Thorpe (23)	Otis Thorpe (14)	Allan Houston (7)	The Palace Of Auburn Hills; 16,740	22–20
43	February 3	Sacramento	L 85–94	Grant Hill (22)	Theo Ratliff (13)	Grant Hill (8)	The Palace Of Auburn Hills; 17,350	22–21
44	February 5	@ New York	L 91–97	Allan Houston (24)	Grant Hill (12)	Grant Hill, Allan Houston, Joe Dumars (5)	Madison Square Garden; 19,763	22–22
45	February 7	Orlando	W 97–83	Allan Houston (31)	Otis Thorpe (13)	Grant Hill (7)	The Palace Of Auburn Hills; 21,454	23–22
All-Star Break
46	February 14	@ Philadelphia	W 102–83	Grant Hill (24)	Don Reid (9)	Grant Hill (6)	CoreStates Spectrum; 10,288	24–22
47	February 15	Chicago	L 109–112 (OT)	Allan Houston (27)	Grant Hill, Otis Thorpe (10)	Grant Hill (9)	The Palace Of Auburn Hills; 21,454	24–23
48	February 17	Toronto	W 108–95	Allan Houston (29)	Otis Thorpe (10)	Joe Dumars (14)	The Palace Of Auburn Hills; 21,454	25–23
49	February 19	Minnesota	W 113–83	Grant Hill (18)	Terry Mills (8)	Grant Hill (7)	The Palace Of Auburn Hills; 15,970	26–23
50	February 21	New York	L 110–113 (OT)	Otis Thorpe (27)	Grant Hill (15)	Grant Hill (11)	The Palace Of Auburn Hills; 20,265	26–24
51	February 23	@ Minnesota	L 93–94	Allan Houston (24)	Grant Hill (8)	Grant Hill (13)	Target Center; 14,154	26–25
52	February 25	@ Portland	W 93–81	Grant Hill, Allan Houston (23)	Grant Hill (12)	Grant Hill (5)	Rose Garden Arena; 20,680	27–25
53	February 26	@ Sacramento	W 93–78	Grant Hill (21)	Otis Thorpe (13)	Grant Hill (6)	ARCO Arena; 17,317	28–25
54	February 28	@ Seattle	L 80–94	Allan Houston (29)	Terry Mills (9)	Grant Hill (6)	KeyArena at Seattle Center; 17,072	28–26

March: 11–5 (home: 8–1; road: 3–4)

Game	Date	Team	Score	High points	High rebounds	High assists	Location Attendance	Record
55	March 1	@ Phoenix	W 102–97	Allan Houston (26)	Grant Hill (15)	Grant Hill (7)	America West Arena; 19,023	29–26
56	March 2	@ L.A. Clippers	W 107–103	Grant Hill (35)	Grant Hill (11)	Grant Hill (8)	Los Angeles Memorial Sports Arena; 14,948	30–26
57	March 4	Atlanta	W 99–93	Allan Houston (26)	Grant Hill (11)	Grant Hill (12)	The Palace Of Auburn Hills; 16,225	31–26
58	March 5	@ Toronto	W 105–84	Grant Hill (31)	Grant Hill (15)	Grant Hill (7)	SkyDome; 22,968	32–26
59	March 7	@ Chicago	L 81–102	Allan Houston (21)	Grant Hill (13)	Grant Hill (6)	United Center; 23,369	32–27
60	March 9	Dallas	W 92–91	Otis Thorpe (20)	Grant Hill (17)	Grant Hill (6)	The Palace Of Auburn Hills; 21,454	33–27
61	March 11	L.A. Clippers	W 100–90	Grant Hill (31)	Grant Hill (10)	Grant Hill, Allan Houston (7)	The Palace Of Auburn Hills; 15,490	34–27
62	March 13	Phoenix	W 118–115	Allan Houston (30)	Grant Hill (17)	Grant Hill (11)	The Palace Of Auburn Hills; 17,443	35–27
63	March 15	Cleveland	W 80–69	Allan Houston (22)	Grant Hill (13)	Grant Hill (6)	The Palace Of Auburn Hills; 20,135	36–27
64	March 17	Denver	W 91–81	Allan Houston (28)	Grant Hill (13)	Grant Hill (10)	The Palace Of Auburn Hills; 21,454	37–27
65	March 19	@ Orlando	L 91–113	Lindsey Hunter (15)	Grant Hill, Otis Thorpe, Terry Mills (6)	Grant Hill (7)	Orlando Arena; 17,248	37–28
66	March 20	@ Miami	L 93–102	Grant Hill, Allan Houston (21)	Grant Hill (12)	Grant Hill (7)	Miami Arena; 15,200	37–29
67	March 22	New Jersey	W 111–96	Grant Hill (26)	Grant Hill (9)	Grant Hill, Allan Houston, Joe Dumars (5)	The Palace Of Auburn Hills; 16,150	38–29
68	March 23	@ Atlanta	L 84–92	Allan Houston (38)	Grant Hill (13)	Joe Dumars (7)	Omni Coliseum; 16,378	38–30
69	March 26	Vancouver	W 86–75	Grant Hill (28)	Grant Hill (17)	Joe Dumars (5)	The Palace Of Auburn Hills; 15,781	39–30
70	March 30	Miami	L 85–95	Allan Houston (22)	Otis Thorpe (15)	Grant Hill, Allan Houston (6)	The Palace Of Auburn Hills; 21,454	39–31

April: 7–5 (home: 5–0; road: 2–5)

Game	Date	Team	Score	High points	High rebounds	High assists	Location Attendance	Record
71	April 2	@ Milwaukee	L 98–105	Allan Houston (29)	Terry Mills (7)	Joe Dumars (7)	Bradley Center; 16,112	39–32
72	April 3	Charlotte	W 98–83	Otis Thorpe (27)	Otis Thorpe (9)	Grant Hill (10)	The Palace Of Auburn Hills; 17,459	40–32
73	April 5	@ Philadelphia	W 108–87	Lindsey Hunter (17)	Grant Hill (9)	Grant Hill (10)	CoreStates Spectrum; 12,317	41–32
74	April 7	@ Boston	L 97–98	Allan Houston (26)	Grant Hill (10)	Grant Hill (10)	FleetCenter; 18,624	41–33
75	April 9	@ New Jersey	W 111–94	Allan Houston (23)	Grant Hill (13)	Grant Hill (9)	Brendan Byrne Arena; 17,205	42–33
76	April 10	Philadelphia	W 92–76	Allan Houston (23)	Grant Hill (13)	Grant Hill (9)	Brendan Byrne Arena; 17,205	43–33
77	April 13	@ Indiana	L 86–91	Grant Hill (20)	Otis Thorpe, Mark West (9)	Grant Hill (6)	Market Square Arena; 16,760	43–34
78	April 14	Boston	W 105–96 (OT)	Allan Houston (27)	Otis Thorpe (17)	Grant Hill (10)	The Palace Of Auburn Hills; 16,522	44–34
79	April 17	Indiana	W 102–93	Allan Houston (31)	Grant Hill (9)	Joe Dumars (11)	The Palace Of Auburn Hills; 16,522	45–34
80	April 18	@ Chicago	L 79–110	Lindsey Hunter (19)	Theo Ratliff (11)	Lindsey Hunter (7)	United Center; 23,614	45–35
81	April 20	@ Cleveland	L 73–75	Allan Houston (26)	Allan Houston, Grant Hill (7)	Joe Dumars (7)	Gund Arena; 20,562	45–36
82	April 21	Milwaukee	W 108–92	Otis Thorpe, Joe Dumars (19)	Otis Thorpe (12)	Grant Hill (8)	The Palace Of Auburn Hills; 18,689	46–36

1995–96 schedule

=== Playoffs ===
1996 playoff game log
First Round: 0–3 (home: 0–1; road: 0–2)

Game	Date	Team	Score	High points	High rebounds	High assists	Location Attendance	Series
1	April 26	@ Orlando	L 92–112	Grant Hill (21)	Grant Hill (11)	three players tied (4)	Orlando Arena; 17,248	0–1
2	April 28	@ Orlando	L 77–92	Allan Houston (23)	Otis Thorpe (16)	Otis Thorpe (3)	Orlando Arena; 17,248	0–2
3	April 30	Orlando	L 98–101	Allan Houston (33)	Otis Thorpe (13)	Joe Dumars (7)	The Palace of Auburn Hills; 20,386	0–3

1996 schedule

== Player statistics ==
Legend
GP	Games played	GS	Games started	MPG	Minutes per game
FG%	Field-goal percentage	3P%	3-point field-goal percentage	FT%	Free-throw percentage
RPG	Rebounds per game	APG	Assists per game	SPG	Steals per game
BPG	Blocks per game	PPG	Points per game

=== Regular season ===
Player	GP	GS	MPG	FG%	3P%	FT%	RPG	APG	SPG	BPG	PPG
Steve Bardo	9	0	13.7	.391	.000	.667	2.4	1.7	0.4	0.1	2.4
Michael Curry	41	1	18.3	.464	.400	.707	2.0	0.6	0.6	0.0	4.9
Joe Dumars	67	40	32.7	.426	.406	.822	2.1	4.0	0.6	0.0	11.8
Grant Hill	80	80	40.8	.462	.192	.751	9.8	6.9	1.3	0.6	20.2
Allan Houston	82	75	37.5	.453	.427	.823	3.7	3.0	0.7	0.2	19.7
Lindsey Hunter	80	48	26.7	.381	.405	.700	2.4	2.4	1.1	0.2	8.5
Eric Leckner	18	8	8.6	.621		.615	1.9	0.1	0.1	0.2	2.4
Mark Macon	23	0	12.5	.433	.467	.818	1.0	0.7	0.7	0.0	3.2
Terry Mills	82	5	20.2	.419	.396	.771	4.3	1.2	0.5	0.2	9.4
Theo Ratliff	75	2	17.4	.557	.000	.708	4.0	0.2	0.2	1.5	4.5
Don Reid	69	46	14.4	.567		.662	2.9	0.2	0.7	0.6	3.8
Lou Roe	49	2	7.6	.356	.222	.750	1.6	0.3	0.2	0.2	1.8
Otis Thorpe	82	82	34.6	.530	.000	.710	8.4	1.9	0.6	0.5	14.2
Mark West	47	21	14.5	.484		.622	2.8	0.1	0.1	0.8	3.2

=== Playoffs ===
Player	GP	GS	MPG	FG%	3FG%	FT%	RPG	APG	SPG	BPG	PPG
Allan Houston	3	3	45.3	.431	.333	.900	2.7	2.0	0.0	0.3	25.0
Grant Hill	3	3	38.3	.564	.500	.857	7.3	3.7	1.0	0.0	19.0
Joe Dumars	3	3	41.0	.457	.357	1.000	4.3	3.7	0.0	0.0	13.7
Otis Thorpe	3	3	33.7	.542		.750	11.7	2.3	0.0	0.0	11.7
Mark West	3	3	26.0	.524		.462	5.3	0.3	0.3	0.3	9.3
Terry Mills	3	0	16.0	.250	.125	.833	1.7	1.3	0.3	0.0	5.3
Lindsey Hunter	2	0	18.0	.250	.250	.500	1.0	0.5	0.5	0.0	3.0
Michael Curry	3	0	14.3	.429	.000		1.0	0.3	0.3	0.3	2.0
Don Reid	3	0	8.7	.333		.333	0.3	0.3	0.0	0.7	1.0
Theo Ratliff	1	0	4.0				0.0	0.0	0.0	0.0	0.0
Lou Roe	2	0	3.5	.000			1.0	0.0	0.5	0.0	0.0
Eric Leckner	1	0	3.0				0.0	0.0	0.0	0.0	0.0

Player statistics citation:

== Awards and records ==
- Grant Hill, All-NBA Second Team

== Transactions ==
- September 20, 1995: Traded Randolph Childress and Bill Curley to the Portland Trail Blazers for Otis Thorpe.
- October 5, 1995: Signed Steve Bardo as a free agent.
- December 29, 1995: Waived Walter Bond.
- January 5, 1996: Waived Steve Bardo.
- January 31, 1996: Signed Michael Curry to the first of two consecutive 10-day contracts.
- February 22, 1996: Signed Michael Curry for the remainder of the season.

Player transactions citation:

== See also ==
- 1995–96 NBA season
