= Otis Thorpe =

American basketball player (born 1962)

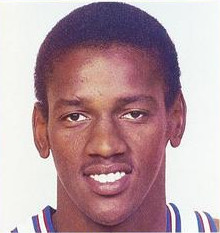
- Thorpe, circa 1986

Personal information
- Born: August 5, 1962 (age 64) Boynton Beach, Florida, U.S.
- Listed height: 6 ft 10 in (2.08 m)
- Listed weight: 248 lb (112 kg)

Career information
- High school: Lake Worth Community (Lake Worth, Florida)
- College: Providence (1980–1984)
- NBA draft: 1984: 1st round, 9th overall pick
- Drafted by: Kansas City Kings
- Playing career: 1984–2001
- Position: Power forward / center
- Number: 33, 50, 10, 52

Career history
- 1984–1988: Kansas City / Sacramento Kings
- 1988–1995: Houston Rockets
- 1995: Portland Trail Blazers
- 1995–1997: Detroit Pistons
- 1997–1998: Vancouver Grizzlies
- 1998: Sacramento Kings
- 1998–1999: Washington Wizards
- 1999–2000: Miami Heat
- 2000–2001: Charlotte Hornets

Career highlights
- NBA champion (1994); NBA All-Star (1992); First-team All-Big East (1984); 2× Third-team All-Big East (1982, 1983); Big East All-Freshman Team (1981)

Career statistics
- Points: 17,600 (14.0 ppg)
- Rebounds: 10,370 (8.2 rpg)
- Assists: 2,730 (2.2 apg)
- Stats at NBA.com
- Stats at Basketball Reference

Otis Henry Thorpe (born August 5, 1962) is an American former professional basketball player who played for several teams in the National Basketball Association (NBA). He was an NBA All-Star in 1992 and won an NBA championship with the Houston Rockets in 1994.

== Early years ==
Thorpe graduated in 1980 from Lake Worth Community High School in Florida. He played college ball at Providence College. He had the longest NBA career of any former Friars player. He ranks seventh all-time at the school in rebounds and was the school's first First-Team Big East player. During his tenure at Providence College he was also a two-time Honorable Mention All-America selection.

== NBA career ==
=== Kansas City/Sacramento Kings ===
Thorpe was drafted by the Kansas City Kings as the ninth overall pick in the first round of the 1984 NBA draft. In 1985, the Kings relocated to Sacramento. During the 1987-88 NBA season, Thorpe averaged career-highs of 20.8 points, 10.2 rebounds, and 3.2 assists. That year, in perhaps his best game of the season, Thorpe nearly missed a triple-double with 35 points, 11 rebounds, and 9 assists. Thorpe was traded to the Houston Rockets for Rodney McCray and Jim Petersen in October 1988.

=== Houston Rockets ===
While with the Rockets, Thorpe made an All-Star appearance in 1992. Thorpe played in 542 consecutive games between 1986 and 1992 and, at one time, held the longest streak of consecutive games played in the NBA.

On December 7, 1993, Thorpe scored a career-high 40 points in a win over the Charlotte Hornets. That season, Thorpe was an integral part of the Houston Rockets' trip to the 1994 NBA Finals and subsequent first NBA Championship.

46 games through the next season, the Rockets realized that they were struggling and needed a change. The team sent Thorpe to the Portland Trail Blazers in a deal for Clyde Drexler and Tracy Murray. He holds the Rockets' all-time record for the highest field goal accuracy (55.9%).

=== Portland Trail Blazers ===
Thorpe would only play 34 games for the Blazers before moving on to occupy the starting front court for the Detroit Pistons (who acquired him in a package for Randolph Childress and Bill Curley) for the next two years.

=== Vancouver Grizzlies ===
Before the start of the 1997–98 season, the Pistons dealt Thorpe to the Vancouver Grizzlies for a conditional first-round draft pick which eventually conveyed to the Pistons as the second pick in the 2003 draft, which became Darko Miličić.

Thorpe would play 47 games with the Grizzlies before returning to the Kings in a trade that sent Bobby Hurley and Michael Smith to Vancouver. (Chris Robinson was also traded to the Kings as part of the deal.)

=== Bouncing around the league and career endings ===
In the offseason, he was traded (along with Mitch Richmond) to the Washington Wizards for Chris Webber. He signed with the Miami Heat in 1999 and was traded to the Charlotte Hornets, along with Rodney Buford, P.J. Brown, Jamal Mashburn, and Tim James in a deal for Anthony Mason, Ricky Davis, Dale Ellis, and Eddie Jones. When Thorpe finished his last game in 2001, he was the last remaining member of the Kansas City Kings to retire.

Thorpe holds career averages of 14.0 points and 8.2 rebounds per game. He finished his career with over 17,000 points and 10,000 rebounds in the NBA.

== NBA career statistics ==
Legend
GP	Games played	GS	Games started	MPG	Minutes per game
FG%	Field goal percentage	3P%	3-point field goal percentage	FT%	Free throw percentage
RPG	Rebounds per game	APG	Assists per game	SPG	Steals per game
BPG	Blocks per game	PPG	Points per game	**Bold**	Career high
†	Won an NBA championship	*	Led the league

=== Regular season ===
Year	Team	GP	GS	MPG	FG%	3P%	FT%	RPG	APG	SPG	BPG	PPG
1984–85	Kansas City	**82**	23	23.4	**.600**	.000	.620	6.8	1.4	.4	.5	12.8
1985–86	Sacramento	75	18	22.3	.587	-	.661	5.6	1.1	.5	.5	9.9
1986–87	Sacramento	**82**	**82**	36.0	.540	.000	.761	10.0	2.5	.6	**.7**	18.9
1987–88	Sacramento	**82**	**82**	37.5	.507	.000	.755	10.2	**3.2**	.8	**.7**	**20.8**
1988–89	Houston	**82**	**82**	**38.2**	.542	.000	.729	9.6	2.5	**1.0**	.5	16.7
1989–90	Houston	**82**	**82**	35.9	.548	.000	.688	9.0	**3.2**	.8	.3	17.1
1990–91	Houston	**82**	**82**	37.1	.556	**.429**	.696	10.3	2.4	.9	.2	17.5
1991–92	Houston	**82**	**82**	37.3	.592	.000	.657	10.5	3.0	.6	.5	17.3
1992–93	Houston	72	69	32.7	.558	.000	.598	8.2	2.5	.6	.3	12.8
1993–94†	Houston	**82**	**82**	35.5	.561	.000	.657	**10.6**	2.3	.8	.3	14.0
1994–95	Houston	36	35	33.0	.563	.000	.528	8.9	1.6	.6	.4	13.3
1994–95	Portland	34	0	26.7	.568	.000	.649	6.9	1.6	.6	.4	13.5
1995–96	Detroit	**82**	**82***	34.6	.530	.000	.710	8.4	1.9	.6	.5	14.2
1996–97	Detroit	79	79	33.7	.532	.000	.653	7.9	1.7	.7	.2	13.1
1997–98	Vancouver	47	46	33.5	.477	.000	.694	7.9	3.4	.6	.5	11.2
1997–98	Sacramento	27	20	23.1	.459	.000	.657	6.1	2.3	.7	.3	8.3
1998–99	Washington	49	38	31.4	.545	.000	.698	6.8	2.1	.9	.4	11.3
1999–00	Miami	51	1	15.2	.514	.000	.604	3.3	.6	.5	.2	5.5
2000–01	Charlotte	49	4	13.2	.450	-	**.833**	3.0	.6	.2	.1	2.8
Career		1,257	989	31.7	.546	.047	.687	8.2	2.2	.7	.4	14.0
All-Star		1	0	4.0	1.000	-	-	-	-	-	-	2.0

=== Playoffs ===
Year	Team	GP	GS	MPG	FG%	3P%	FT%	RPG	APG	SPG	BPG	PPG
1986	Sacramento	3	0	11.7	.231	-	.462	4.0	.0	.0	.3	4.0
1989	Houston	4	4	38.0	**.649**	-	.762	5.0	3.0	**1.3**	.3	16.0
1990	Houston	4	4	**41.0**	.600	-	.684	8.3	1.8	**1.3**	.0	**20.0**
1991	Houston	3	3	38.7	.579	-	.500	8.3	2.7	.7	.0	15.7
1993	Houston	12	12	34.9	.635	-	.651	8.6	2.6	.5	.1	14.5
1994†	Houston	**23**	**23**	37.1	.572	**.500**	.567	9.9	2.3	.6	**.4**	11.3
1995	Portland	3	0	22.0	.571	-	.700	4.3	.7	.0	.0	10.3
1996	Detroit	3	3	33.7	.542	-	.750	**11.7**	2.3	.0	.0	11.7
1997	Detroit	5	5	30.4	.512	-	**.778**	6.4	.8	.4	.0	9.8
2000	Miami	10	0	13.6	.481	.000	.500	2.9	.3	.0	.2	3.3
2001	Charlotte	8	0	7.1	.222	-	-	2.1	.0	.0	.0	.5
Career		78	54	28.9	.569	.333	.631	7.0	1.6	.4	.2	10.1

== See also ==
- List of NBA career games played leaders
- List of NBA career rebounding leaders
- List of NBA career turnovers leaders
- List of NBA career personal fouls leaders
- List of NBA career field goal percentage leaders
- List of NBA career minutes played leaders
