= 1995–96 NBA season =

50th National Basketball Association season

- League: National Basketball Association
- Sport: Basketball
- Duration: November 3, 1995 – April 21, 1996; April 25 – June 2, 1996 (Playoffs); June 5 – 16, 1996 (Finals)
- Teams: 29
- TV partner(s): NBC, TBS, TNT

Draft
- Top draft pick: Joe Smith
- Picked by: Golden State Warriors

Regular season
- Top seed: Chicago Bulls
- Season MVP: Michael Jordan (Chicago)
- Top scorer: Michael Jordan (Chicago)

Playoffs
- Eastern champions: Chicago Bulls
- Eastern runners-up: Orlando Magic
- Western champions: Seattle SuperSonics
- Western runners-up: Utah Jazz

Finals
- Champions: Chicago Bulls
- Runners-up: Seattle SuperSonics
- Finals MVP: Michael Jordan (Chicago)

NBA seasons
- ← 1994–95 1996–97 →

The 1995–96 NBA season was the 50th season of the National Basketball Association (NBA), though the 50th anniversary was not celebrated until the following season. The Chicago Bulls defeated the Seattle SuperSonics 4 games to 2 in the NBA Finals to win their fourth championship.

== 1995 NBA lockout ==
The 1995 NBA lockout was the first lockout of four in the history of the NBA. When the previous collective bargaining agreement expired after the 1993–94 season, a no-strike, no-lockout agreement was made in October 1994, with a moratorium on signing or restructuring player contracts. That moratorium expired on June 15, 1995, one day after the NBA Finals concluded. The expansion draft (which was held on June 24) and the NBA draft (which was held on June 28) were allowed to take place, but all other league business, including trades, free-agent signings, contract extensions, and summer leagues were suspended from July 1 until September 12; no games were lost due to the lockout, as a new collective bargaining agreement was reached well before the start of the 1995–96 season. Among the key issues in the labor dispute were the salary cap, free agency, a rookie salary cap, and revenue sharing.

== Notable occurrences ==
Coaching changes
Offseason
Team	1994–95 coach	1995–96 coach
Boston Celtics	Chris Ford	M.L. Carr
Detroit Pistons	Don Chaney	Doug Collins
Golden State Warriors	Bob Lanier	Rick Adelman
Miami Heat	Alvin Gentry	Pat Riley
New York Knicks	Pat Riley	Don Nelson
Toronto Raptors	Expansion	Brendan Malone
Vancouver Grizzlies	Expansion	Brian Winters
In-season
Team	Outgoing coach	Incoming coach
Minnesota Timberwolves	Bill Blair	Flip Saunders
New York Knicks	Don Nelson	Jeff Van Gundy
Phoenix Suns	Paul Westphal	Cotton Fitzsimmons

- The NBA established its first Canadian teams since the 1946–47 Toronto Huskies, as the Toronto Raptors and the Vancouver Grizzlies made their debuts as the NBA's 28th and 29th franchises. The Grizzlies began play at GM Place (now Rogers Arena) as a member of the Midwest Division while the Raptors set up shop at the SkyDome (now Rogers Centre), with some games also played at Copps Coliseum, as a member of the Central Division. Each franchise won its first game, although Toronto would win only 21 games in the season, and Vancouver 15 games.
- The Chicago Bulls finished the season with a combined regular season and postseason record of 87–13, the best in NBA history. Chicago's 72 wins remained an NBA record until 2015–16, when the Golden State Warriors, who were coached by ex-Bulls guard Steve Kerr, posted a 73–9 record, despite winning a combined 88 regular season and postseason games, they failed to win the championship. Prior to the start of the NBA Playoffs, the Bulls shocked the basketball world by wearing black socks, claiming this as redemption to the city's most infamous sports moment, the Black Sox Scandal of 1919. The socks would become a Bulls playoff tradition, which other teams soon follow. However, this was not the first time a team or a particular player wore black socks; earlier in the season, Orlando Magic forward Dennis Scott wore black socks while competing in the AT&T Three-Point Shootout at NBA All-Star Weekend.
- The Miami Heat hired Pat Riley as the team's new head coach and president of basketball operations. The hire caused controversy as the New York Knicks claimed that the Heat were guilty of tampering. After an investigation by the NBA, the Heat were found guilty and were forced to give the Knicks $1 million and a first round draft pick. Riley's first moves were the acquisition of Alonzo Mourning from the Charlotte Hornets for Glen Rice, and the trade for Tim Hardaway from the Golden State Warriors for Kevin Willis. Hardaway and Mourning would turn the struggling Heat into contenders in the coming seasons.
- NBA debuts for four future All-Stars Kevin Garnett, Michael Finley, Rasheed Wallace and Jerry Stackhouse. Toronto Raptors point guard Damon Stoudamire won Rookie of the Year.
- Michael Jordan became the only player to win the NBA Finals MVP Award at least four times. He would also become the second player to earn the MVP triple crown since Willis Reed in 1970, having won All-Star, Regular Season and Finals MVP in the same season; an achievement he also accomplished in 1998, and later on by Shaquille O'Neal in 2000.
- Michael Jordan won his NBA record 8th scoring title.
- The Boston Celtics played their first season at the FleetCenter (now TD Garden).
- The 1996 NBA All-Star Game was played at the Alamodome in San Antonio, with the East defeating the West 129–118. Michael Jordan of the Chicago Bulls was named the game's MVP. Los Angeles Clippers guard Brent Barry won the Slam Dunk Contest.
- Referees were locked out to begin the season, but reached an agreement to return to work in December 1995.
- Following the referee lockout, legendary official Jake O'Donnell retired after 27 seasons (1968–95). O'Donnell, who also was an American League umpire from 1968 to 1971, worked the NBA Finals for 23 consecutive years (1972 through 1994). He remains the only official to work all-star games in two major professional sports.
- Magic Johnson comes out of retirement to play in 32 games for Los Angeles before retiring again at the end of the season.
- The Philadelphia 76ers play their final season at The Spectrum. At the time, it was named the CoreStates Spectrum; the CoreStates name was later added on their future home arena under construction at the time. The 76ers would return to the renamed Wachovia Spectrum for a farewell game in the 2008–09 season before its eventual demolition.
- Hakeem Olajuwon passed Kareem Abdul-Jabbar as the all-time leader in blocked shots in the last game of the season. John Stockton also became the all-time steals and assists leader, passing Maurice Cheeks and Magic Johnson, respectively. Robert Parish also passed Abdul-Jabbar for the most games played in the NBA.
- Portland Trail Blazers' longest sellout streak by any team in professional sports ends at 814, during which the team played its first season at higher-capacity Rose Garden, now the Moda Center.
- The Sacramento Kings made their first playoff appearance since 1986.

== 1995–96 NBA changes ==
- The Atlanta Hawks changed their logo and uniforms, which featured the Hawks' logo on the front of the jerseys. The road jerseys were both red and black.
- The Boston Celtics moved into the FleetCenter.
- The Chicago Bulls got new black alternate uniforms with pinstripes.
- The Houston Rockets changed their logo and uniforms, adding pinstripes to their jerseys and navy to their color scheme.
- The Miami Heat added new red alternate uniforms.
- The Milwaukee Bucks added new green alternate uniforms.
- The New York Knicks added the "New York" script to their logo, and got new blue alternate uniforms, with black side panels on their jerseys.
- The Portland Trail Blazers moved into the Rose Garden.
- The Seattle SuperSonics changed their logo and uniforms, replacing their primary green and yellow colors with dark green and red with side panels on their jerseys.
- The expansion Toronto Raptors got a new logo and new pinstripe uniforms, adding purple and red to their color scheme.
- The expansion Vancouver Grizzlies got a new logo and new uniforms, adding teal and brown to their color scheme.

== Standings ==
=== By division ===
Atlantic Division	W	L	PCT	GB	Home	Road	Div	GP
y–Orlando Magic	60	22	.732	12.0	37‍–‍4	23‍–‍18	21–3	82
x–New York Knicks	47	35	.573	25.0	26‍–‍15	21‍–‍20	16–8	82
x–Miami Heat	42	40	.512	30.0	26‍–‍15	16‍–‍25	13–12	82
Washington Bullets	39	43	.476	33.0	25‍–‍16	14‍–‍27	10–14	82
Boston Celtics	33	49	.402	39.0	18‍–‍23	15‍–‍26	12–12	82
New Jersey Nets	30	52	.366	42.0	20‍–‍21	10‍–‍31	8–17	82
Philadelphia 76ers	18	64	.220	54.0	11‍–‍30	7‍–‍34	5–19	82

Central Division	W	L	PCT	GB	Home	Road	Div	GP
z–Chicago Bulls	72	10	.878	–	39‍–‍2	33‍–‍8	24–4	82
x–Indiana Pacers	52	30	.634	20.0	32‍–‍9	20‍–‍21	19–9	82
x–Cleveland Cavaliers	47	35	.573	25.0	26‍–‍15	21‍–‍20	13–15	82
x–Atlanta Hawks	46	36	.561	26.0	26‍–‍15	20‍–‍21	15–13	82
x–Detroit Pistons	46	36	.561	26.0	30‍–‍11	16‍–‍25	15–13	82
Charlotte Hornets	41	41	.500	31.0	25‍–‍16	16‍–‍25	13–15	82
Milwaukee Bucks	25	57	.305	47.0	14‍–‍27	11‍–‍30	8–20	82
Toronto Raptors	21	61	.256	51.0	15‍–‍26	6‍–‍35	5–23	82

Midwest Division	W	L	PCT	GB	Home	Road	Div
y-San Antonio Spurs	59	23	.720	–	33–8	26–15	19–5
x-Utah Jazz	55	27	.671	4	34–7	21–20	14–10
x-Houston Rockets	48	34	.585	11	27–14	21–20	15–9
Denver Nuggets	35	47	.427	24	24–17	11–30	13–11
Minnesota Timberwolves	26	56	.317	33	17–24	9–32	10–14
Dallas Mavericks	26	56	.317	33	16–25	10–31	10–14
Vancouver Grizzlies	15	67	.183	44	10–31	5–36	3–21

Pacific Division	W	L	PCT	GB	Home	Road	Div
c-Seattle SuperSonics	64	18	.780	–	38–3	26–15	21–3
x-Los Angeles Lakers	53	29	.646	11	30–11	23–18	17–7
x-Portland Trail Blazers	44	38	.537	20	26–15	18–23	11–13
x-Phoenix Suns	41	41	.500	23	25–16	16–25	9–15
x-Sacramento Kings	39	43	.476	25	26–15	13–28	11–13
Golden State Warriors	36	46	.439	28	23–18	13–28	7–17
Los Angeles Clippers	29	53	.354	35	19–22	10–31	7–17

=== By conference ===
Eastern Conference
#	Team	W	L	PCT	GB	GP
1	z–Chicago Bulls	72	10	.878	–	82
2	y–Orlando Magic	60	22	.732	12.0	82
3	x–Indiana Pacers	52	30	.634	20.0	82
4	x–Cleveland Cavaliers	47	35	.573	25.0	82
5	x–New York Knicks	47	35	.573	25.0	82
6	x–Atlanta Hawks	46	36	.561	26.0	82
7	x–Detroit Pistons	46	36	.561	26.0	82
8	x–Miami Heat	42	40	.512	30.0	82
9	Charlotte Hornets	41	41	.500	31.0	82
10	Washington Bullets	39	43	.476	33.0	82
11	Boston Celtics	33	49	.402	39.0	82
12	New Jersey Nets	30	52	.366	42.0	82
13	Milwaukee Bucks	25	57	.305	47.0	82
14	Toronto Raptors	21	61	.256	51.0	82
15	Philadelphia 76ers	18	64	.220	54.0	82

Western Conference
#	Team	W	L	PCT	GB	GP
1	c-Seattle SuperSonics *	64	18	.780	–	82
2	y-San Antonio Spurs *	59	23	.720	5	82
3	x-Utah Jazz	55	27	.671	9	82
4	x-Los Angeles Lakers	53	29	.646	11	82
5	x-Houston Rockets	48	34	.585	16	82
6	x-Portland Trail Blazers	44	38	.537	20	82
7	x-Phoenix Suns	41	41	.500	23	82
8	x-Sacramento Kings	39	43	.476	25	82
9	Golden State Warriors	36	46	.439	28	82
10	Denver Nuggets	35	47	.427	29	82
11	Los Angeles Clippers	29	53	.354	35	82
12	Minnesota Timberwolves	26	56	.317	38	82
13	Dallas Mavericks	26	56	.317	38	82
14	Vancouver Grizzlies	15	67	.183	49	82

Notes

- z – Clinched home court advantage for the entire playoffs
- c – Clinched home court advantage for the conference playoffs
- y – Clinched division title
- x – Clinched playoff spot

== Playoffs ==
Teams in bold advanced to the next round. The numbers to the left of each team indicate the team's seeding in its conference, and the numbers to the right indicate the number of games the team won in that round. The division champions are marked by an asterisk. Home court advantage does not necessarily belong to the higher-seeded team, but instead the team with the better regular season record; teams enjoying the home advantage are shown in italics.

First Round	Conference Semifinals
**E1**	**Chicago***	**3**
E8	Miami	0
**E1**	**Chicago***	**4**
E5	New York	1
E4	Cleveland	0
**E5**	**New York**	**3**
**Eastern Conference**
E3	Indiana	2
**E6**	**Atlanta**	**3**
E6	Atlanta	1
**E2**	**Orlando***	**4**
**E2**	**Orlando***	**3**
E7	Detroit	0
**W1**	**Seattle***	**3**
W8	Sacramento	1
**W1**	**Seattle***	**4**
W5	Houston	0
W4	LA Lakers	1
**W5**	**Houston**	**3**
**Western Conference**
**W3**	**Utah**	**3**
W6	Portland	2
**W3**	**Utah**	**4**
W2	San Antonio*	2
**W2**	**San Antonio***	**3**
W7	Phoenix	1

Conference Finals
**E1**	**Chicago***	**4**
E2	Orlando*	0
**W1**	**Seattle***	**4**
W3	Utah	3

NBA Finals
**E1**	**Chicago***	**4**
W1	Seattle*	2

- * Division winner
- **Bold** Series winner
- Italic Team with home-court advantage

== Statistics leaders ==
Category	Player	Team	Stat
Points per game	Michael Jordan	Chicago Bulls	30.4
Rebounds per game	Dennis Rodman	Chicago Bulls	14.9
Assists per game	John Stockton	Utah Jazz	11.2
Steals per game	Gary Payton	Seattle SuperSonics	2.85
Blocks per game	Dikembe Mutombo	Denver Nuggets	4.49
FG%	Gheorghe Mureșan	Washington Bullets	.584
FT%	Mahmoud Abdul-Rauf	Denver Nuggets	.930
3FG%	Tim Legler	Washington Bullets	.522

== NBA awards ==
=== Yearly awards ===
- NBA Most Valuable Player: Michael Jordan, Chicago Bulls
- NBA Rookie of the Year: Damon Stoudamire, Toronto Raptors
- NBA Defensive Player of the Year: Gary Payton, Seattle SuperSonics
- Sixth Man of the Year: Toni Kukoč, Chicago Bulls
- NBA Most Improved Player: Gheorghe Mureșan, Washington Bullets
- NBA Coach of the Year: Phil Jackson, Chicago Bulls

- All-NBA First Team:
  - F – Karl Malone, Utah Jazz
  - F – Scottie Pippen, Chicago Bulls
  - C – David Robinson, San Antonio Spurs
  - G – Michael Jordan, Chicago Bulls
  - G – Penny Hardaway, Orlando Magic

- All-NBA Second Team:
  - F – Shawn Kemp, Seattle SuperSonics
  - F – Grant Hill, Detroit Pistons
  - C – Hakeem Olajuwon, Houston Rockets
  - G – Gary Payton, Seattle SuperSonics
  - G – John Stockton, Utah Jazz

- All-NBA Third Team:
  - F – Charles Barkley, Phoenix Suns
  - F – Juwan Howard, Washington Bullets
  - C – Shaquille O'Neal, Orlando Magic
  - G – Mitch Richmond, Sacramento Kings
  - G – Reggie Miller, Indiana Pacers

- NBA All-Defensive First Team:
  - F – Dennis Rodman, Chicago Bulls
  - F – Scottie Pippen, Chicago Bulls
  - C – David Robinson, San Antonio Spurs
  - G – Michael Jordan, Chicago Bulls
  - G – Gary Payton, Seattle SuperSonics

- NBA All-Defensive Second Team:
  - F – Horace Grant, Orlando Magic
  - F – Derrick McKey, Indiana Pacers
  - C – Hakeem Olajuwon, Houston Rockets
  - G – Bobby Phills, Cleveland Cavaliers
  - G – Mookie Blaylock, Atlanta Hawks

- NBA All-Rookie First Team:
  - Damon Stoudamire, Toronto Raptors
  - Joe Smith, Golden State Warriors
  - Jerry Stackhouse, Philadelphia 76ers
  - Antonio McDyess, Denver Nuggets
  - Arvydas Sabonis, Portland Trail Blazers
  - Michael Finley, Phoenix Suns

- All-NBA Rookie Second Team:
  - Rasheed Wallace, Washington Bullets
  - Kevin Garnett, Minnesota Timberwolves
  - Bryant Reeves, Vancouver Grizzlies
  - Brent Barry, Los Angeles Clippers
  - Tyus Edney, Sacramento Kings

=== Player of the week ===
The following players were named NBA Player of the Week.

Week	Player
Nov. 3 – Nov. 12	Penny Hardaway (Orlando Magic)
Nov. 13 – Nov. 19	Cedric Ceballos (Los Angeles Lakers)
Nov. 20 – Nov. 26	Shawn Kemp (Seattle SuperSonics)
Nov. 27 – Dec. 3	Terrell Brandon (Cleveland Cavaliers)
Dec. 4 – Dec. 10	Dikembe Mutombo (Denver Nuggets)
Dec. 11 – Dec. 17	Scottie Pippen (Chicago Bulls)
Dec. 18 – Dec. 24	Michael Jordan (Chicago Bulls)
Dec. 25 – Dec. 30	Karl Malone (Utah Jazz)
Jan. 2 – Jan. 7	Clifford R. Robinson (Portland Trail Blazers)
Jan. 8 – Jan. 14	David Robinson (San Antonio Spurs)
Jan. 15 – Jan. 21	Michael Jordan (Chicago Bulls)
Jan. 22 – Jan. 28	Reggie Miller (Indiana Pacers)
Jan. 29 – Feb. 4	Jason Kidd (Dallas Mavericks)
Feb. 13 – Feb. 18	Armen Gilliam (New Jersey Nets)
Feb. 19 – Feb. 25	Shawn Kemp (Seattle SuperSonics)
Feb. 26 – Mar. 3 (tie)	Hakeem Olajuwon (Houston Rockets)
Feb. 26 – Mar. 3 (tie)	Shaquille O'Neal (Orlando Magic)
Mar. 4 – Mar. 10	Michael Jordan (Chicago Bulls)
Mar. 11 – Mar. 17	Grant Hill (Detroit Pistons)
Mar. 18 – Mar. 24	Chris Gatling (Miami Heat)
Mar. 25 – Mar. 31	Arvydas Sabonis (Portland Trail Blazers)
Apr. 1 – Apr. 7	Kevin Johnson (Phoenix Suns)

=== Player of the month ===
The following players were named NBA Player of the Month.

Month	Player
November	Penny Hardaway (Orlando Magic)
December	Scottie Pippen (Chicago Bulls)
January	Michael Jordan (Chicago Bulls)
February	Charles Barkley (Phoenix Suns)
March	David Robinson (San Antonio Spurs)
April	Juwan Howard (Washington Bullets)

=== Rookie of the month ===
The following players were named NBA Rookie of the Month.

Month	Rookie
November	Damon Stoudamire (Toronto Raptors)
December	Joe Smith (Golden State Warriors)
January	Damon Stoudamire (Toronto Raptors)
February	Joe Smith (Golden State Warriors)
March	Jerry Stackhouse (Philadelphia 76ers)
April	Arvydas Sabonis (Portland Trail Blazers)

=== Coach of the month ===
The following coaches were named NBA Coach of the Month.

Month	Coach
November	Garry St. Jean (Sacramento Kings)
December	Mike Fratello (Cleveland Cavaliers)
January	Phil Jackson (Chicago Bulls)
February	George Karl (Seattle SuperSonics)
March	Bob Hill (San Antonio Spurs)
April	Phil Jackson (Chicago Bulls)

== See also ==
- List of NBA regular season records
