= 1995–96 Denver Nuggets season =

NBA professional basketball team season

- Head coach: Bernie Bickerstaff
- President: Bernie Bickerstaff
- General manager: Bernie Bickerstaff
- Arena: McNichols Sports Arena

Results
- Record: 35–47 (.427)
- Place: Division: 4th (Midwest); Conference: 9th (Western)
- Playoff finish: Did not qualify
- Stats at Basketball Reference

Local media
- Television: KWGN-TV; Prime Sports Rocky Mountain
- Radio: KOA

The 1995–96 Denver Nuggets season was the 20th season for the Denver Nuggets in the National Basketball Association, and their 29th season as a franchise.

== Season summary ==
=== Off-season ===
The Nuggets had the 15th overall pick in the 1995 NBA draft, and selected shooting guard Brent Barry out of Oregon State University, but soon traded him to the Los Angeles Clippers in exchange for rookie power forward, and first-round draft pick Antonio McDyess from the University of Alabama. During the off-season, the team acquired Don MacLean and Doug Overton from the Washington Bullets.

=== Regular season ===
Despite the addition of McDyess and MacLean, the Nuggets struggled by losing eight of their first nine games of the regular season, as LaPhonso Ellis missed the first 37 games due to a knee injury. Despite the slow start, the Nuggets soon recovered and won eight of their next nine games, leading to a 9–9 start to the season. However, the team soon fell below .500 in winning percentage, later on posting a six-game losing streak in January, and holding a 20–27 record at the All-Star break.

In March, the Nuggets found themselves in the middle of an ugly controversy, as Mahmoud Abdul-Rauf refused to stand for the Star-Spangled Banner, protesting what he felt was the country's poor treatment to Muslims in the world; he was then suspended for one game by the league. After his suspension, Abdul-Rauf agreed to stand and pray during the anthem by closing his eyes, and holding his hands out in front of his face with his head down. However, the damage was done, and his reputation could not be repaired, as he was the consistent target of boos from fans, before missing the remainder of the season due to ankle, and foot injuries after playing 57 games. The Nuggets finished in fourth place in the Midwest Division with a 35–47 record, and failed to qualify for the NBA playoffs.

Abdul-Rauf averaged 19.2 points and 6.8 assists per game, and also contributed 121 three-point field goals, while Dale Ellis averaged 14.9 points per game and led the Nuggets with 150 three-point field goals, and McDyess provided the team with 13.4 points, 7.5 rebounds and 1.5 blocks per game, and was named to the NBA All-Rookie First Team. In addition, Dikembe Mutombo provided with 11.0 points, 11.8 rebounds and 4.5 blocks per game, while Bryant Stith contributed 13.6 points and 1.4 steals per game, MacLean provided with 11.2 points and 3.7 rebounds per game, and LaPhonso Ellis averaged 10.5 points and 7.2 rebounds per game. Meanwhile, second-year guard Jalen Rose contributed 10.0 points and 6.2 assists per game, Tom Hammonds averaged 4.8 points and 3.1 rebounds per game, and Reggie Williams contributed 4.6 points per game.

During the NBA All-Star weekend at the Alamodome in San Antonio, Texas, Mutombo was selected for the 1996 NBA All-Star Game, as a member of the Western Conference All-Star team, while McDyess was selected for the NBA Rookie Game, as a member of the Western Conference Rookie team. Mutombo also finished in third place in Defensive Player of the Year voting. The Nuggets finished 16th in the NBA in home-game attendance, with an attendance of 675,425 at the McNichols Sports Arena during the regular season.

=== Aftermath ===
Following the season, Abdul-Rauf was traded to the Sacramento Kings, while Mutombo signed as a free agent with the Atlanta Hawks after five seasons with the Nuggets. Meanwhile, Rose and Williams were both traded to the Indiana Pacers, and MacLean and Overton both signed with the Philadelphia 76ers.

== Draft picks ==
Round	Pick	Player	Position	Nationality	School/Club team
1	15	Brent Barry (traded to LA Clippers)	Shooting guard	United States	Oregon State
2	44	Anthony Pelle	Center	United States	Fresno State

== Roster ==
1995–96 Denver Nuggets roster
Players

Pos.	No.	Player	Height	Weight	DOB	From
G	1	Mahmoud Abdul-Rauf (injured)	6 ft 1 in (1.85 m)	162 lb (73 kg)	1969–03–09	LSU
C	8	Rastko Cvetković (injured)	7 ft 1 in (2.16 m)	260 lb (118 kg)	1970–06–22	Serbia
F	3	Dale Ellis	6 ft 7 in (2.01 m)	205 lb (93 kg)	1960–08–06	Tennessee
F	20	LaPhonso Ellis	6 ft 8 in (2.03 m)	240 lb (109 kg)	1970–05–05	Notre Dame
C	50	Matt Fish	6 ft 11 in (2.11 m)	235 lb (107 kg)	1969–11–18	UNC Wilmington
G	9	Greg Grant	5 ft 7 in (1.70 m)	140 lb (64 kg)	1966–08–29	TCNJ
F	21	Tom Hammonds	6 ft 9 in (2.06 m)	215 lb (98 kg)	1967–03–27	Georgia Tech
F	7	Don MacLean	6 ft 10 in (2.08 m)	235 lb (107 kg)	1970–01–16	UCLA
F	24	Antonio McDyess	6 ft 9 in (2.06 m)	220 lb (100 kg)	1974–09–07	Alabama
C	55	Dikembe Mutombo	7 ft 2 in (2.18 m)	245 lb (111 kg)	1966–06–25	Georgetown
G	11	Doug Overton	6 ft 3 in (1.91 m)	190 lb (86 kg)	1969–08–03	La Salle
G	5	Jalen Rose	6 ft 8 in (2.03 m)	210 lb (95 kg)	1973–01–30	Michigan
G	23	Bryant Stith	6 ft 5 in (1.96 m)	208 lb (94 kg)	1970–12–10	Virginia
F	34	Reggie Williams	6 ft 7 in (2.01 m)	190 lb (86 kg)	1964–03–05	Georgetown

Coaches
Head coach
- Bernie Bickerstaff
Assistant(s)
- Bob Kloppenburg
- Gene Littles

Legend
- (DP) Unsigned draft pick
- (FA) Free agent
- (S) Suspended
- Injured

Roster
Updated: March 29, 1996

== Regular season ==
=== Season standings ===
Midwest Division	W	L	PCT	GB	Home	Road	Div
y-San Antonio Spurs	59	23	.720	–	33–8	26–15	19–5
x-Utah Jazz	55	27	.671	4	34–7	21–20	14–10
x-Houston Rockets	48	34	.585	11	27–14	21–20	15–9
Denver Nuggets	35	47	.427	24	24–17	11–30	13–11
Minnesota Timberwolves	26	56	.317	33	17–24	9–32	10–14
Dallas Mavericks	26	56	.317	33	16–25	10–31	10–14
Vancouver Grizzlies	15	67	.183	44	10–31	5–36	3–21

Western Conference
#	Team	W	L	PCT	GB	GP
1	c-Seattle SuperSonics *	64	18	.780	–	82
2	y-San Antonio Spurs *	59	23	.720	5	82
3	x-Utah Jazz	55	27	.671	9	82
4	x-Los Angeles Lakers	53	29	.646	11	82
5	x-Houston Rockets	48	34	.585	16	82
6	x-Portland Trail Blazers	44	38	.537	20	82
7	x-Phoenix Suns	41	41	.500	23	82
8	x-Sacramento Kings	39	43	.476	25	82
9	Golden State Warriors	36	46	.439	28	82
10	Denver Nuggets	35	47	.427	29	82
11	Los Angeles Clippers	29	53	.354	35	82
12	Minnesota Timberwolves	26	56	.317	38	82
13	Dallas Mavericks	26	56	.317	38	82
14	Vancouver Grizzlies	15	67	.183	49	82

=== Game log ===
Game	Date	Opponent	Result	Nuggets points	Opponents	Record	Streak	OT
1	November 3	@ LA Lakers	Loss	96	98	0-1	Lost 1	
2	November 4	San Antonio	Loss	108	116	0-2	Lost 2	
3	November 7	@ Golden State	Loss	93	98	0-3	Lost 3	
4	November 8	Seattle	Loss	117	122	0-4	Lost 4	
5	November 10	@ Utah	Loss	86	109	0-5	Lost 5	
6	November 12	@ LA Clippers	Loss	103	108	0-6	Lost 6	
7	November 15	@ Phoenix	Win	137	127	1-6	Won 1	3OT
8	November 17	New York	Loss	94	103	1-7	Lost 1	
9	November 18	@ Houston	Loss	97	101	1-8	Lost 2	
10	November 21	Atlanta	Win	107	99	2-8	Won 1	
11	November 24	@ Dallas	Win	112	109	3-8	Won 2	OT
12	November 25	Utah	Win	94	91	4-8	Won 3	
13	November 28	@ Sacramento	Loss	85	91	4-9	Lost 1	
14	December 2	Minnesota	Win	109	105	5-9	Won 1	
15	December 4	Detroit	Win	85	82	6-9	Won 2	
16	December 7	@ Utah	Win	124	119	7-9	Won 3	
17	December 8	Phoenix	Win	103	98	8-9	Won 4	
18	December 11	@ Philadelphia	Win	104	91	9-9	Won 5	
19	December 12	@ Indiana	Loss	92	125	9-10	Lost 1	
20	December 14	@ New York	Win	103	94	10-10	Won 1	
21	December 16	@ Atlanta	Loss	86	95	10-11	Lost 1	
22	December 17	@ Cleveland	Loss	79	92	10-12	Lost 2	
23	December 20	Golden State	Win	109	104	11-12	Won 1	
24	December 21	@ San Antonio	Loss	96	114	11-13	Lost 1	
25	December 23	LA Clippers	Loss	92	107	11-14	Lost 2	
26	December 26	Dallas	Win	114	102	12-14	Won 1	
27	December 27	@ Seattle	Loss	83	99	12-15	Lost 1	
28	December 29	@ Phoenix	Loss	92	103	12-16	Lost 2	
29	December 30	Philadelphia	Win	108	100	13-16	Won 1	
30	January 2	Indiana	Loss	87	102	13-17	Lost 1	
31	January 4	@ Sacramento	Loss	96	126	13-18	Lost 2	
32	January 6	Miami	Loss	86	88	13-19	Lost 3	
33	January 7	@ LA Lakers	Win	96	93	14-19	Won 1	
34	January 10	@ Vancouver	Win	91	85	15-19	Won 2	
35	January 12	Cleveland	Win	90	83	16-19	Won 3	
36	January 13	Portland	Loss	117	118	16-20	Lost 1	
37	January 16	@ Portland	Loss	69	87	16-21	Lost 2	
38	January 17	Houston	Loss	112	120	16-22	Lost 3	
39	January 20	Sacramento	Loss	110	115	16-23	Lost 4	
40	January 24	@ Seattle	Loss	79	86	16-24	Lost 5	
41	January 25	@ LA Clippers	Loss	93	94	16-25	Lost 6	
42	January 27	Toronto	Win	93	82	17-25	Won 1	
43	January 30	@ Minnesota	Win	88	86	18-25	Won 2	
44	February 1	@ Milwaukee	Loss	102	108	18-26	Lost 1	
45	February 4	Chicago	Win	105	99	19-26	Won 1	
46	February 6	LA Lakers	Loss	78	99	19-27	Lost 1	
47	February 8	LA Clippers	Win	115	95	20-27	Won 1	
48	February 13	@ Orlando	Loss	93	121	20-28	Lost 1	
49	February 15	@ Miami	Loss	91	97	20-29	Lost 2	
50	February 16	@ Charlotte	Loss	100	107	20-30	Lost 3	
51	February 18	Boston	Win	117	93	21-30	Won 1	
52	February 22	@ Portland	Loss	78	107	21-31	Lost 1	
53	February 24	Utah	Win	99	90	22-31	Won 1	
54	February 27	Washington	Win	96	92	23-31	Won 2	
55	February 29	Dallas	Loss	120	137	23-32	Lost 1	
56	March 2	Vancouver	Win	108	82	24-32	Won 1	
57	March 4	San Antonio	Loss	90	101	24-33	Lost 1	
58	March 6	@ San Antonio	Loss	90	100	24-34	Lost 2	
59	March 7	Phoenix	Win	103	92	25-34	Won 1	
60	March 9	Golden State	Win	102	88	26-34	Won 2	
61	March 10	New Jersey	Loss	88	99	26-35	Lost 1	
62	March 12	Orlando	Win	110	93	27-35	Won 1	
63	March 15	@ Chicago	Loss	87	108	27-36	Lost 1	
64	March 17	@ Detroit	Loss	81	91	27-37	Lost 2	
65	March 18	@ Toronto	Win	122	114	28-37	Won 1	
66	March 21	@ New Jersey	Loss	89	97	28-38	Lost 1	
67	March 22	@ Boston	Loss	98	99	28-39	Lost 2	
68	March 24	@ Washington	Loss	90	92	28-40	Lost 3	
69	March 26	Charlotte	Loss	112	119	28-41	Lost 4	2OT
70	March 28	@ Vancouver	Win	92	88	29-41	Won 1	
71	March 30	Milwaukee	Win	98	85	30-41	Won 2	
72	April 2	Minnesota	Win	86	78	31-41	Won 3	
73	April 4	@ Golden State	Loss	90	98	31-42	Lost 1	
74	April 5	Portland	Loss	91	97	31-43	Lost 2	
75	April 7	Houston	Win	111	105	32-43	Won 1	
76	April 9	LA Lakers	Win	98	91	33-43	Won 2	
77	April 11	@ Houston	Loss	109	113	33-44	Lost 1	
78	April 14	@ Minnesota	Win	98	91	34-44	Won 1	
79	April 15	Sacramento	Loss	86	90	34-45	Lost 1	
80	April 18	@ Dallas	Loss	98	132	34-46	Lost 2	
81	April 19	Vancouver	Loss	78	92	34-47	Lost 3	
82	April 21	Seattle	Win	99	88	35-47	Won 1	

== Player statistics ==
Legend
GP	Games played	GS	Games started	MPG	Minutes per game
FG%	Field-goal percentage	3P%	3-point field-goal percentage	FT%	Free-throw percentage
RPG	Rebounds per game	APG	Assists per game	SPG	Steals per game
BPG	Blocks per game	PPG	Points per game

=== Regular season ===
Player	GP	GS	MPG	FG%	3FG%	FT%	RPG	APG	SPG	BPG	PPG
Mahmoud Abdul-Rauf	57	53	35.6	.434	.392	.930	2.4	6.8	1.1	0.1	19.2
Dale Ellis	81	52	32.4	.479	.412	.760	3.9	1.7	0.7	0.1	14.9
Bryant Stith	82	77	34.3	.416	.277	.844	4.9	2.9	1.4	0.2	13.6
Antonio McDyess	76	75	30.0	.485	.000	.683	7.5	1.0	0.7	1.5	13.4
Don MacLean	56	5	19.8	.426	.286	.732	3.7	1.6	0.4	0.1	11.2
Dikembe Mutombo	74	74	36.7	.499	.000	.695	11.8	1.5	0.5	4.5	11.0
LaPhonso Ellis	45	28	28.2	.438	.182	.601	7.2	1.6	0.8	0.7	10.5
Jalen Rose	80	37	26.7	.480	.296	.690	3.3	6.2	0.7	0.5	10.0
Tom Hammonds	71	4	14.7	.474		.765	3.1	0.3	0.3	0.2	4.8
Reggie Williams	52	5	15.7	.370	.225	.846	2.3	1.4	0.7	0.4	4.6
Reggie Slater	4	0	6.5	.545		.400	1.8	0.5	0.3	0.3	3.5
Doug Overton	55	0	11.0	.376	.308	.727	1.1	1.9	0.2	0.1	3.3
Matt Fish	16	0	7.3	.577		.556	1.1	0.4	0.2	0.4	2.5
Randy Woods	8	0	9.0	.273	.238	1.000	0.8	1.5	0.8	0.1	2.4
Greg Grant	10	0	10.9	.261	.333		0.7	1.4	0.2	0.0	1.4
Rastko Cvetkovic	14	0	3.4	.313	.000	.000	0.8	0.2	0.1	0.1	0.7
Elmore Spencer	6	0	3.5	.000			0.7	0.0	0.0	0.0	0.0

Player statistics citation:

== Awards, records, and honors ==
- Antonio McDyess, NBA All-Rookie Team 1st Team
