= Elden Campbell =

American basketball player (1968–2025)

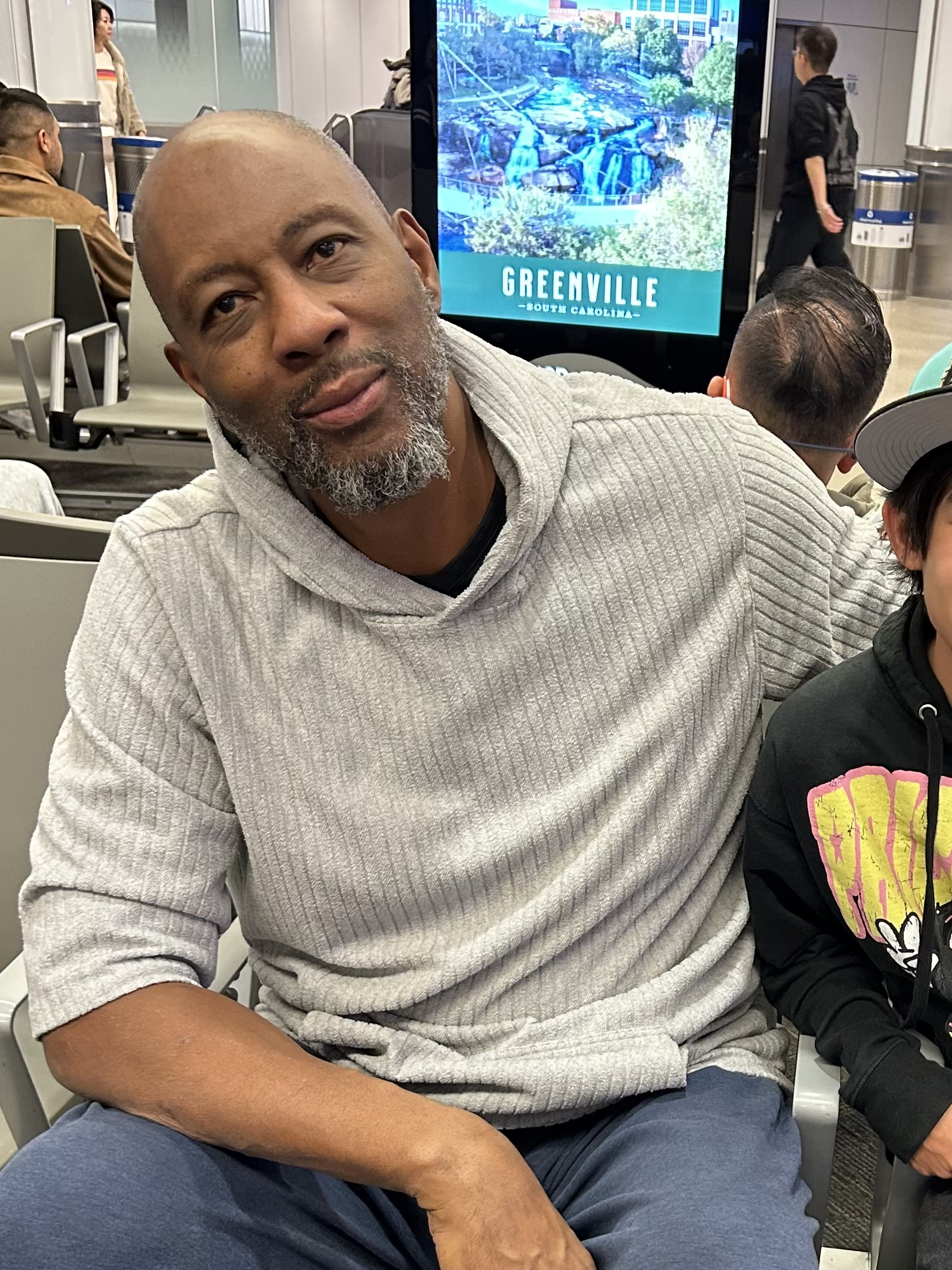
- Campbell in 2024

Personal information
- Born: July 23, 1968 Los Angeles, California, U.S.
- Died: December 1, 2025 (aged 57) Pompano Beach, Florida, U.S.
- Listed height: 7 ft 0 in (2.13 m)
- Listed weight: 279 lb (127 kg)

Career information
- High school: Morningside (Inglewood, California)
- College: Clemson (1986–1990)
- NBA draft: 1990: 1st round, 27th overall pick
- Drafted by: Los Angeles Lakers
- Playing career: 1990–2005
- Position: Power forward / center
- Number: 41, 5

Career history
- 1990–1999: Los Angeles Lakers
- 1999–2002: Charlotte Hornets
- 2002–2003: New Orleans Hornets
- 2003: Seattle SuperSonics
- 2003–2005: Detroit Pistons
- 2005: New Jersey Nets
- 2005: Detroit Pistons

Career highlights
- NBA champion (2004); AP honorable mention All-American (1990); First-team All-ACC (1990); Second-team All-ACC (1989)

Career NBA statistics
- Points: 10,805 (10.3 ppg)
- Rebounds: 6,116 (5.9 rpg)
- Blocks: 1,602 (1.5 bpg)
- Stats at NBA.com
- Stats at Basketball Reference

Elden Jerome Campbell (July 23, 1968 – December 1, 2025) was an American professional basketball player who was a power forward and center in the National Basketball Association (NBA) from 1990 to 2005, primarily with the Los Angeles Lakers. He played college basketball for the Clemson Tigers, earning honorable mention All-American honors as a senior in 1990. Campbell was selected by the Lakers in the first round of the 1990 NBA draft with the 27th overall pick. He spent his first nine years in the NBA with the Lakers and the rest with various other teams. He won an NBA championship with the Detroit Pistons in 2004.

== Early life ==
Campbell was born in Los Angeles, and attended Morningside High School in Inglewood, California, before playing college basketball at Clemson University for the Tigers. He earned third-team All-Atlantic Coast Conference (ACC) honors from the Associated Press as a sophomore in 1987–88, when he averaged a career-high 18.8 points per game. He was a second-team All-ACC selection in his junior year on the Tigers' 1988–89 squad that advanced to the 1989 NCAA tournament. As a senior in 1989–90, Campbell led them to a 26–9 record and the program's only regular-season ACC title. He was named an honorable mention All-American and first-team All-ACC. In the 1990 NCAA tournament, Clemson lost in the Sweet 16 to Connecticut on a buzzer-beater. Campbell scored 1,880 career points at Clemson and holds the school record for points, and is second in career blocks with 334.

== Professional career ==
The Los Angeles Lakers selected Campbell with the 27th pick in the 1990 NBA draft. As a rookie in 1990–91, he was a reserve during Magic Johnson's last full season in the NBA, which marked the end of the Lakers' Showtime era. In the 1991 NBA Finals against the Chicago Bulls, Campbell played just six minutes in the first four games before scoring 21 points in 27 minutes in a game 5 loss that clinched the title for the Bulls. He had a breakthrough season in his fourth year in 1993–94 with averages of 12.3 points and 6.8 rebounds per game for a struggling squad that suffered its worst record in 44 years with a .402 winning percentage. It launched his most productive stretch with the Lakers, a five-season span from 1993 to 1998 in which he averaged 12.7 points, 6.8 rebounds and 1.8 blocks, including a career-high 14.9 points per game in 1996–97 while playing with Shaquille O'Neal and Kobe Bryant. On March 10, 1999, Campbell was traded by the Lakers along with Eddie Jones to the Charlotte Hornets for Glen Rice, J. R. Reid and B. J. Armstrong; he missed out on the O'Neal- and Bryant-led Lakers teams that won three consecutive NBA championships in the early 2000s.

Campbell's longest tenures were with the Lakers and the Hornets (in both Charlotte and New Orleans); he also played with the Seattle SuperSonics and briefly for the New Jersey Nets. He played most of his final two seasons with the Detroit Pistons, winning an NBA championship in 2004 over the Lakers and losing the 2005 NBA Finals in seven games to the San Antonio Spurs. He had joined the Pistons on a two-year, $8.4 million contract in 2003, turning down more lucrative offers in order to join a championship contender. Campbell played in 65 games with 27 starts in 2003–04, averaging 5.6 points, 3.2 rebounds and 0.8 blocks in 13.7 minutes. He did not complain when he was moved to the bench. After playing in just nine of Detroit's first 18 playoff games, his minutes doubled from earlier rounds and he played in every game of the 2004 NBA Finals as a valuable, big defender against Lakers center Shaquille O'Neal. Campbell was the first player off the bench for either team in game 1, when he established personal highs for that postseason of 18 minutes, six points and four assists. The following season, he also defended O'Neal, who had moved on to the Miami Heat, in the 2005 Eastern Conference finals.

Campbell's 15-year career comprised 1,044 games, of which he started 671, and 106 playoff games, of which he started 53. In 15 seasons, he averaged 10.3 points, 5.9 rebounds, and 1.5 blocks per game. He had 1,602 career blocks, which ranked 35th in NBA history as of 2025. Campbell was the Lakers' leading scorer in the 1990s, and he ranks third in career blocks in franchise history with 1,022. His nicknames were "Easy" and "Big E".

== NBA career statistics ==
Legend
GP	Games played	GS	Games started	MPG	Minutes per game
FG%	Field goal percentage	3P%	3-point field goal percentage	FT%	Free throw percentage
RPG	Rebounds per game	APG	Assists per game	SPG	Steals per game
BPG	Blocks per game	PPG	Points per game	**Bold**	Career high
†	Won an NBA championship	*	Led the league

=== Regular season ===
Year	Team	GP	GS	MPG	FG%	3P%	FT%	RPG	APG	SPG	BPG	PPG
1990–91	L.A. Lakers	52	0	7.3	.455	–	.653	1.8	.2	.2	.7	2.8
1991–92	L.A. Lakers	81	47	23.2	.448	.000	.619	5.2	.7	.7	2.0	7.1
1992–93	L.A. Lakers	79	13	19.6	.458	.000	.637	4.2	.6	.7	1.3	7.7
1993–94	L.A. Lakers	76	74	29.6	.462	.000	.689	6.8	1.1	.8	1.9	12.3
1994–95	L.A. Lakers	73	59	28.4	.459	.000	.666	6.1	1.3	.9	1.8	12.5
1995–96	L.A. Lakers	**82**	**82***	32.9	**.503**	.000	.713	7.6	**2.2**	1.1	**2.6**	13.9
1996–97	L.A. Lakers	77	77	32.6	.469	.250	.711	8.0	1.6	.6	1.5	14.9
1997–98	L.A. Lakers	81	28	22.0	.463	**.500**	.693	5.6	1.0	.4	1.3	10.1
1998–99	L.A. Lakers	17	1	19.1	.436	–	.613	5.6	.5	.1	.9	7.4
1998–99	Charlotte	32	32	**35.4**	.489	.000	.647	**9.4**	1.9	**1.2**	1.8	**15.3**
1999–00	Charlotte	78	77	32.5	.446	.000	.690	7.6	1.7	.7	1.9	12.7
2000–01	Charlotte	78	78	30.0	.440	.000	.709	7.8	1.3	.8	1.8	13.1
2001–02	Charlotte	77	74	28.0	.484	.000	.797	6.9	1.3	.8	1.8	13.9
2002–03	New Orleans	41	1	16.7	.409	.000	**.809**	3.5	1.0	.6	.8	7.2
2002–03	Seattle	15	0	12.2	.333	–	.762	2.6	.6	.6	.5	3.2
2003–04†	Detroit	65	27	13.7	.439	–	.685	3.2	.7	.3	.8	5.6
2004–05	New Jersey	10	0	5.0	.000	–	.500	1.1	.3	.0	.1	.2
2004–05	Detroit	30	1	11.0	.336	.000	.784	2.6	.5	.3	.2	3.9
Career		1,044	671	24.7	.460	.054	.699	5.9	1.1	.7	1.5	10.3

=== Playoffs ===
Year	Team	GP	GS	MPG	FG%	3P%	FT%	RPG	APG	SPG	BPG	PPG
1991	L.A. Lakers	**14**	0	9.9	**.658**	–	.467	2.1	.2	.4	.6	4.1
1992	L.A. Lakers	4	2	29.3	.378	–	.667	6.3	1.5	.8	1.5	10.0
1993	L.A. Lakers	5	5	35.6	.420	–	.500	**8.4**	1.4	**1.2**	2.4	14.0
1995	L.A. Lakers	10	**10**	**37.6**	.485	–	.659	7.3	1.6	.4	**3.0**	**15.7**
1996	L.A. Lakers	4	4	32.3	.513	.000	.500	8.0	**2.0**	.3	2.3	12.0
1997	L.A. Lakers	9	9	30.9	.398	**1.000**	.816	4.3	1.0	.8	1.4	11.8
1998	L.A. Lakers	13	0	13.8	.451	–	.647	3.5	.6	.2	.9	5.2
2000	Charlotte	4	4	37.5	.468	.000	**.929**	8.3	1.0	.5	1.0	14.3
2001	Charlotte	10	**10**	28.7	.396	–	.755	7.9	.7	.5	1.1	12.1
2002	Charlotte	9	9	28.2	.445	.000	.706	6.7	1.8	.7	2.6	13.6
2004†	Detroit	**14**	0	8.8	.286	–	.556	1.8	.7	.4	.6	2.1
2005	Detroit	10	0	5.8	.308	–	.500	1.8	.5	.2	.0	1.2
Career		106	53	21.4	.440	.250	.670	4.7	.9	.5	1.3	8.4

== Personal life and death ==
In 2000, Campbell was inducted into the Clemson Hall of Fame. In 2024, Campbell was selected for the 2025 class of the Southern California Basketball Hall of Fame.

Campbell died of an accidental drowning while fishing in Pompano Beach, Florida, on December 1, 2025, at age 57. He was married to Rosemary and had four children.

== See also ==
- 1990 NCAA Men's Basketball All-Americans
- List of National Basketball Association career blocks leaders
