= Matt Fish =

American basketball player (born 1969)

Personal information
- Born: November 18, 1969 (age 56) Washington, Iowa, U.S.
- Listed height: 6 ft 11 in (2.11 m)
- Listed weight: 275 lb (125 kg)

Career information
- High school: Washington (Washington, Iowa)
- College: UNC Wilmington (1988–1992)
- NBA draft: 1992: 2nd round, 50th overall pick
- Drafted by: Golden State Warriors
- Playing career: 1992–2002
- Position: Center
- Number: 50, 6, 22

Career history
- 1992: Philadelphia Spirit
- 1992: Omaha Racers
- 1992: Grand Rapids Hoops
- 1992–1993: Yakima Sun Kings
- 1993: Gravelines
- 1993–1994: Quad City Thunder
- 1994–1995: Los Angeles Clippers
- 1995: Peñarol de Mar del Plata
- 1995–1996: Fort Wayne Fury
- 1996: New York Knicks
- 1996: Denver Nuggets
- 1996–1997: Washington Bullets
- 1997: Fort Wayne Fury
- 1997: Miami Heat
- 1998–1999: La Crosse Bobcats
- 1999–2000: San Diego Stingrays
- 2000–2001: Porto
- 2001: Polonia Warsaw
- 2001: Phoenix Eclipse
- 2001–2002: Belgrano de San Nicolás

Career highlights
- CBA champion (1994); CBA All-Rookie Second Team (1993); First-team All-CAA (1992)
- Stats at NBA.com
- Stats at Basketball Reference

Matthew Edward Fish (born November 18, 1969) is an American former professional basketball player who played in the National Basketball Association (NBA) for the Los Angeles Clippers, Denver Nuggets, New York Knicks, Miami Heat and Washington Bullets. He played collegiately at the University of North Carolina at Wilmington and was drafted in the 1992 NBA Draft to the Golden State Warriors.

Fish played in the Continental Basketball Association (CBA) for the Grand Rapids Hoops, Omaha Racers, Yakima Sun Kings, Quad City Thunder, Fort Wayne Fury and La Crosse Bobcats from 1992 to 1999. He won a CBA championship with the Thunder in 1994. He was selected to the CBA All-Rookie Second Team in 1993.

Fish went on to earn a master's in Education and a master's in Business to go along with his BA in Communication and Special Education. He publishes Rebound Magazine, the NBA-approved official publication of the National Basketball Retired Players Association (NBRPA), where is he also the President of the Phoenix Chapter. He was the first member intern for the NBRPA at the corporate level in Chicago.

Fish also played in the IBA and the CBA, where he played a major role in the 1994 CBA champions Quad City Thunder. Fish was a CBA All-Star, All-Rookie team, and the number one center in the CBA during his career.

During his playing days, when making a hook shot, it was often called a "Fish Hook", a play on his name.

== Career statistics ==
Legend
GP	Games played	GS	Games started	MPG	Minutes per game
FG%	Field goal percentage	3P%	3-point field goal percentage	FT%	Free throw percentage
RPG	Rebounds per game	APG	Assists per game	SPG	Steals per game
BPG	Blocks per game	PPG	Points per game	**Bold**	Career high

=== NBA ===
==== Regular season ====
Year	Team	GP	GS	MPG	FG%	3P%	FT%	RPG	APG	SPG	BPG	PPG
1994–95	L.A. Clippers	**26**	**8**	**14.2**	.476	.000	**.676**	**3.2**	**.7**	**.6**	.3	4.7
1995–96	New York	2	1	8.5	**.600**	–	.000	1.5	.5	.0	**.5**	**6.0**
1995–96	Denver	16	0	7.3	.577	–	.556	1.1	.4	.2	.4	2.5
1996–97	Washington	5	0	1.4	.333	–	–	1.0	.0	.0	.0	.4
1996–97	Miami	1	0	1.0	–	–	–	.0	.0	.0	.0	.0
Career		50	9	10.2	.500	.000	.625	2.2	.5	.4	.3	3.5
