= 1996 NBA playoffs =

Postseason tournament

Tournament details
- Dates: April 25 – June 16, 1996
- Season: 1995–96
- Teams: 16

Final positions
- Champions: Chicago Bulls (4th title)
- Runners-up: Seattle SuperSonics
- Semifinalists: Orlando Magic; Utah Jazz

Tournament statistics
- Scoring leader(s): Michael Jordan (Bulls) (30.4 PPG)

Awards
- MVP: Michael Jordan (Bulls)

The 1996 NBA playoffs was the postseason tournament of the National Basketball Association's 1995–96 season. The tournament concluded with the Eastern Conference champion Chicago Bulls defeating the Western Conference champion Seattle SuperSonics 4 games to 2. Michael Jordan was named NBA Finals MVP for a then record fourth time.

== Overview ==
The Chicago Bulls entered the NBA playoffs with a record of 72–10 (the best regular season record until the 2016 Golden State Warriors went 73–9), eclipsing the 1972 Los Angeles Lakers record of 69–13, helped by Michael Jordan's first full season back from his mid-1990's retirement and the addition of another future Hall of Famer to the Bulls, Dennis Rodman. The SuperSonics were only the tenth team in NBA history to win 64 games during the regular season, but their feat went largely unnoticed due to Chicago's record 72 wins.

This was the Sacramento Kings' first playoff appearance since 1986, but would be Mitch Richmond's only one as a King (he previously appeared twice in the playoffs for the Golden State Warriors in 1989 and 1991). The Kings did not make it back until 1999, which began their eight-year string of playoff appearances. Richmond would be traded to the Wizards in 1998 and would later win his first and only championship with the Lakers in 2002 (he would retire shortly thereafter).

Game 4 of the Lakers-Rockets series was Magic Johnson's final NBA game. He would retire for good after a brief in-season comeback following the loss.

As for the two-time defending NBA champion Houston Rockets, their quest for a 3-peat was thwarted by the Seattle SuperSonics, who swept the Rockets 4–0 in the Western Conference Semifinals. The SuperSonics were also the last team to defeat the Rockets in the playoffs before their two–year title run, in the 1993 Western Conference Semifinals (Seattle won 4–3). Also noted during their two-year title run, the Rockets never faced the SuperSonics in the playoffs as they were eliminated in the first round by both the Denver Nuggets and the Los Angeles Lakers, respectively.

The 1996 Eastern Conference Finals between the Chicago Bulls and Orlando Magic were redemption for Michael Jordan after his first return to the playoffs in 1995 and the Bulls' disappointing second-round loss to the 1995 Orlando Magic, a team that would be swept in last year's finals. With Jordan leading the way, the Bulls swept the defending Eastern Conference champion Magic, winning all four games by an average of 17 points. As for the Magic, it ended a three-year run of dominance for the team, as Shaquille O'Neal went on to sign with the Lakers the following season. The Magic did not have another 50-win season, division title and first round playoff series victory until 2008, followed the season afterward by an Eastern Conference championship and the franchise's second NBA Finals appearance in 2009 to which they lost to the Lakers.

With their Western Conference Finals victory over the Utah Jazz, the Seattle SuperSonics made the NBA Finals for the first time since 1979. They wouldn't return ever again because the franchise was sold after drafting future Pro Basketball Hall of Famer, Kevin Durant. With the win, the SuperSonics vindicated themselves as well after their stunning first-round loss to the Denver Nuggets in 1994, when they had become the first top seeded team to lose to an eighth-seed in the NBA playoffs. Despite the Jazz losing in seven games to the SuperSonics in the Western Conference Finals (their third appearance in 5 years), in retrospect it kickstarted their own Finals run, which they ultimately accomplished in 1997 and 1998, but lost both times to the Bulls.

By winning their fourth title in six years, the Bulls capped what many consider to be the greatest season in NBA history, finishing with a combined 87–13 record, including 72–10 in the regular season and 15–3 in the postseason. In addition, they remain the first and only team to win 70+ games in the regular season and win the NBA championship.

== Bracket ==
First Round	Conference Semifinals
E1	Chicago*	3
E8	Miami	0
E1	Chicago*	4
E5	New York	1
E4	Cleveland	0
E5	New York	3
Eastern Conference
E3	Indiana	2
E6	Atlanta	3
E6	Atlanta	1
E2	Orlando*	4
E2	Orlando*	3
E7	Detroit	0
W1	Seattle*	3
W8	Sacramento	1
W1	Seattle*	4
W5	Houston	0
W4	LA Lakers	1
W5	Houston	3
Western Conference
W3	Utah	3
W6	Portland	2
W3	Utah	4
W2	San Antonio*	2
W2	San Antonio*	3
W7	Phoenix	1

Conference Finals
E1	Chicago*	4
E2	Orlando*	0
W1	Seattle*	4
W3	Utah	3

NBA Finals
E1	Chicago*	4
W1	Seattle*	2

- * Division winner
- Bold Series winner
- Italic Team with home-court advantage

== Playoff qualifying ==
=== Western Conference ===
==== Best record in conference ====
The Seattle SuperSonics clinched the best record in the Western Conference, and had home court advantage throughout the Western Conference playoffs.

==== Clinched a playoff berth ====
The following teams clinched a playoff berth in the West:

1. Seattle SuperSonics (64–18, clinched Pacific division)
2. San Antonio Spurs (59–23, clinched Midwest division)
3. Utah Jazz (55–27)
4. Los Angeles Lakers (53–29)
5. Houston Rockets (48–34)
6. Portland Trail Blazers (44–38)
7. Phoenix Suns (41–41)
8. Sacramento Kings (39–43)

=== Eastern Conference ===
==== Best record in NBA ====
The Chicago Bulls clinched the best record in the NBA, and earned home court advantage throughout the entire playoffs.

==== Clinched a playoff berth ====
The following teams clinched a playoff berth in the East:

1. Chicago Bulls (72–10, clinched Central Division)
2. Orlando Magic (60–22, clinched Atlantic division)
3. Indiana Pacers (52–30)
4. Cleveland Cavaliers (47–35)
5. New York Knicks (47–35)
6. Atlanta Hawks (46–36)
7. Detroit Pistons (46–36)
8. Miami Heat (42–40)

== Notes ==
- For the fourth straight postseason, both #5 seeds beat their #4 seeded opponent in the first round.

== First round ==
=== Eastern Conference first round ===
==== (1) Chicago Bulls vs. (8) Miami Heat ====
TBS

April 26
9:30 PM

Boxscore

Miami Heat 85, Chicago Bulls 102
Scoring by quarter: 22–29, 32–25, 13–25, 18–23
Pts: Tim Hardaway 30; Rebs: Chris Gatling 9 Asts: Tim Hardaway 7	Pts: Michael Jordan 35; Rebs: Dennis Rodman 10; Asts: three players 3 each
Chicago leads series, 1–0

United Center, Chicago, Illinois
Attendance: 24,104
Referees: Joe Forte, Luis Grillo, Steve Javie

NBC

April 28
5:30 PM

Boxscore

Miami Heat 75, Chicago Bulls 106
Scoring by quarter: 19–28, 19–35, 19–24, 18–19
Pts: Sasha Danilovic 15; Rebs: Chris Gatling 11; Asts: Tim Hardaway 4	Pts: Michael Jordan 29; Rebs: Scottie Pippen 8 Asts: Scottie Pippen 8
Chicago leads series, 2–0

United Center, Chicago, Illinois
Attendance: 24,202
Referees: Mike Mathis, Paul Mihalak, Bill Oakes

TNT

May 1
8:00 PM

Boxscore

Chicago Bulls 112, Miami Heat 91
Scoring by quarter: 37–23, 25–21, 27–22, 23–25
Pts: Michael Jordan 26; Rebs: Scottie Pippen 18; Asts: Scottie Pippen 10	Pts: Alonzo Mourning 30; Rebs: Mourning, Thomas 8 each Asts: Tim Hardaway 6
Chicago wins series, 3–0

Miami Arena, Miami, Florida
Attendance: 15,200
Referees: Dick Bavetta, Ron Olesiak, Bennett Salvatore

Regular-season series
Chicago won 3–1 in the regular-season series

January 26, 1996

Recap

Miami Heat 80, Chicago Bulls 102

United Center, Chicago, Illinois

February 23, 1996

Recap

Chicago Bulls 104, Miami Heat 113

Miami Arena, Miami

April 2, 1996

Recap

Chicago Bulls 110, Miami Heat 92

Miami Arena, Miami

April 4, 1996

Recap

Miami Heat 92, Chicago Bulls 100

United Center, Chicago, Illinois

This was the second playoff meeting between these two teams, with the Bulls winning the first meeting.

Previous playoff series
Chicago leads 1–0 in all-time playoff series

1992

Chicago Bulls 3, Miami Heat 0

1992 Eastern Conference First Round

==== (2) Orlando Magic vs. (7) Detroit Pistons ====
TBS

April 26
7:00 PM

Boxscore

Detroit Pistons 92, Orlando Magic 112
Scoring by quarter: 18–24, 29–23, 17–33, 28–32
Pts: Grant Hill 21; Rebs: Grant Hill 11; Asts: three players 4 each	Pts: Dennis Scott 23; Rebs: Horace Grant 13; Asts: Brian Shaw 11
Orlando leads series, 1–0

Orlando Arena, Orlando, Florida
Attendance: 17,248
Referees: Mike Mathis, Paul Mihalak, Bill Oakes

NBC

April 28
12:30 PM

Boxscore

Detroit Pistons 77, Orlando Magic 92
Scoring by quarter: 19–25, 19–16, 19–24, 20–27
Pts: Allan Houston 23; Rebs: Otis Thorpe 16; Asts: Otis Thorpe 3	Pts: Shaquille O'Neal 29; Rebs: Horace Grant 10; Asts: Penny Hardaway 8
Orlando leads series, 2–0

Orlando Arena, Orlando, Florida
Attendance: 17,248
Referees: Joe Forte, Steve Javie, Ron Olesiak

TNT

April 30
8:00 PM

Boxscore

Orlando Magic 101, Detroit Pistons 98
Scoring by quarter: 27–18, 24–30, 30–22, 20–28
Pts: Penny Hardaway 24; Rebs: Horace Grant 16; Asts: Penny Hardaway 5	Pts: Allan Houston 33; Rebs: Otis Thorpe 13; Asts: Joe Dumars 7
Orlando wins series, 3–0

The Palace of Auburn Hills, Auburn Hills, Michigan
Attendance: 20,386
Referees: Nolan Fine, Hue Hollins, Ed Middleton

Regular-season series
Orlando won 3–1 in the regular-season series

November 27, 1995

Recap

Detroit Pistons 95, Orlando Magic 96

Orlando Arena, Orlando, Florida

December 23, 1995

Recap

Orlando Magic 94, Detroit Pistons 79

The Palace of Auburn Hills, Auburn Hills, Michigan

February 7, 1996

Recap

Orlando Magic 83, Detroit Pistons 97

The Palace of Auburn Hills, Auburn Hills, Michigan

March 19, 1996

Recap

Detroit Pistons 91, Orlando Magic 113

Orlando Arena, Orlando, Florida

This was the first playoff meeting between the Pistons and the Magic.

==== (3) Indiana Pacers vs. (6) Atlanta Hawks ====
TNT

April 25
8:00 PM

Boxscore

Atlanta Hawks 92, Indiana Pacers 80
Scoring by quarter: 21–27, 28–13, 19–28, 24–12
Pts: Steve Smith 27; Rebs: Grant Long 14; Asts: Mookie Blaylock 9	Pts: Rik Smits 19; Rebs: Dale Davis 12; Asts: Ricky Pierce 5
Atlanta leads series, 1–0

Market Square Arena, Indianapolis, Indiana
Attendance: 16,438
Referees: Dan Crawford, David Jones, Bennett Salvatore

TNT

April 27
8:00 PM

Boxscore

Atlanta Hawks 94, Indiana Pacers 102 (OT)
Scoring by quarter: 15–29, 27–24, 19–19, 26–15, Overtime: 7–15
Pts: Steve Smith 25; Rebs: Christian Laettner 9 Asts: Mookie Blaylock 7	Pts: Rik Smits 29; Rebs: Dale Davis 12; Asts: Mark Jackson 9
Series tied, 1–1

Market Square Arena, Indianapolis, Indiana
Attendance: 16,709
Referees: Joe DeRosa, Ron Garretson, Ed T. Rush

TNT

April 29
8:00 PM

Boxscore

Indiana Pacers 83, Atlanta Hawks 90
Scoring by quarter: 20–21, 20–19, 25–29, 18–21
Pts: McKey, Smits 13 each Rebs: Dale Davis 10; Asts: Mark Jackson 6	Pts: Steve Smith 26; Rebs: Christian Laettner 8 Asts: Mookie Blaylock 7
Atlanta leads series, 2–1

Omni Coliseum, Atlanta, Georgia
Attendance: 11,290
Referees: Jim Clark, Hugh Evans, Jack Nies

TNT

May 2
7:00 PM

Boxscore

Indiana Pacers 83, Atlanta Hawks 75
Scoring by quarter: 25–22, 25–19, 18–23, 15–11
Pts: Rik Smits 17; Rebs: D. Davis, Smits 9 each Asts: Mark Jackson 5	Pts: Steve Smith 19; Rebs: Grant Long 12; Asts: Mookie Blaylock 5
Series tied, 2–2

Omni Coliseum, Atlanta, Georgia
Attendance: 15,482
Referees: Hue Hollins, Bill Oakes, Don Vaden

NBC

May 5
12:30 PM

Boxscore

Atlanta Hawks 89, Indiana Pacers 87
Scoring by quarter: 22–25, 30–22, 15–16, 22–24
Pts: Mookie Blaylock 23; Rebs: Christian Laettner 11; Asts: three players 3 each	Pts: Reggie Miller 29; Rebs: Dale Davis 13; Asts: Mark Jackson 8
Atlanta wins series, 3–2

Market Square Arena, Indianapolis, Indiana
Attendance: 16,731
Referees: Dick Bavetta, Bob Delaney, Jess Kersey

Regular-season series
Indiana won 3–1 in the regular-season series

November 3, 1995

Recap

Indiana Pacers 111, Atlanta Hawks 106

The Omni, Atlanta

January 17, 1996

Recap

Indiana Pacers 93, Atlanta Hawks 102

The Omni, Atlanta

January 30, 1996

Recap

Atlanta Hawks 90, Indiana Pacers 107

Market Square Arena, Indianapolis

April 8, 1996

Recap

Atlanta Hawks 95, Indiana Pacers 97

Market Square Arena, Indianapolis

This was the fourth playoff meeting between these two teams, with the Pacers winning two of the first three meetings.

Previous playoff series
Indiana leads 2–1 in all-time playoff series

1987

Atlanta Hawks 3, Indiana Pacers 1

1987 Eastern Conference First Round

1994

Atlanta Hawks 2, Indiana Pacers 4

1994 Eastern Conference Semifinals

1995

Atlanta Hawks 0, Indiana Pacers 3

1995 Eastern Conference First Round

==== (4) Cleveland Cavaliers vs. (5) New York Knicks ====
TBS

April 25
7:00 PM

Boxscore

New York Knicks 106, Cleveland Cavaliers 83
Scoring by quarter: 22–17, 18–23, 29–27, 37–16
Pts: Patrick Ewing 23; Rebs: three players 7 each Asts: three players 7 each	Pts: Terrell Brandon 18; Rebs: Michael Cage 8 Asts: Brandon, Majerle 5 each
New York leads series, 1–0

Gund Arena, Cleveland, Ohio
Attendance: 16,419
Referees: Joe DeRosa, Ron Garretson, Ed T. Rush

NBC

April 27
1:00 PM

Boxscore

New York Knicks 84, Cleveland Cavaliers 80
Scoring by quarter: 17–21, 27–20, 18–18, 22–21
Pts: Anthony Mason 23; Rebs: Mason, Ewing 12 each Asts: John Starks 7	Pts: Terrell Brandon 21; Rebs: Michael Cage 8 Asts: Terrell Brandon 12
New York leads series, 2–0

Gund Arena, Cleveland, Ohio
Attendance: 17,232
Referees: Dan Crawford, David Jones, Bennett Salvatore

TBS

May 1
7:00 PM

Boxscore

Cleveland Cavaliers 76, New York Knicks 81
Scoring by quarter: 16–24, 16–26, 23–16, 21–15
Pts: Terrell Brandon 19; Rebs: Michael Cage 12; Asts: Terrell Brandon 7	Pts: John Starks 22; Rebs: Patrick Ewing 10; Asts: three players 4 each
New York wins series, 3–0

Madison Square Garden, New York City, New York
Attendance: 19,763
Referees: Mike Mathis, Jack Nies, Tommy Nunez Sr.

Regular-season series
Cleveland won 3–1 in the regular-season series

November 22, 1995

Recap

New York Knicks 94, Cleveland Cavaliers 84

Gund Arena, Cleveland, Ohio

December 28, 1995

Recap

Cleveland Cavaliers 86, New York Knicks 76

Madison Square Garden, New York City

April 11, 1996

Recap

Cleveland Cavaliers 101, New York Knicks 97

Madison Square Garden, New York City

April 18, 1996

Recap

New York Knicks 77, Cleveland Cavaliers 92

Gund Arena, Cleveland, Ohio

This was the third playoff meeting between these two teams, with the Knicks winning the first two meetings.

Previous playoff series
New York leads 2–0 in all-time playoff series

1978

Cleveland Cavaliers 0, New York Knicks 2

1978 Eastern Conference First Round

1995

Cleveland Cavaliers 1, New York Knicks 3

1995 Eastern Conference First Round

- This is the most recent playoff series between the Knicks & Cavaliers until 2023.

=== Western Conference first round ===
==== (1) Seattle SuperSonics vs. (8) Sacramento Kings ====
TNT

April 26
10:30 PM

Boxscore

Sacramento Kings 85, Seattle SuperSonics 97
Scoring by quarter: 13–24, 25–27, 26–24, 21–22
Pts: Mitch Richmond 18; Rebs: Olden Polynice 9 Asts: Mitch Richmond 4	Pts: Gary Payton 29; Rebs: Ervin Johnson 10; Asts: Gary Payton 9
Seattle leads series, 1–0

KeyArena, Seattle, Washington
Attendance: 17,072
Referees: Hue Hollins, Jack Nies, Tommy Nunez Sr.

TNT

April 28
9:00 PM

Boxscore

Sacramento Kings 90, Seattle SuperSonics 81
Scoring by quarter: 22–23, 21–26, 22–18, 25–14
Pts: Mitch Richmond 37; Rebs: Olden Polynice 16; Asts: Owens, Marciulionis 5 each	Pts: Shawn Kemp 21; Rebs: Shawn Kemp 8 Asts: Gary Payton 7
Series tied, 1–1

KeyArena, Seattle, Washington
Attendance: 17,072
Referees: Bob Delaney, Jess Kersey, Derrick Stafford

TNT

April 30
10:30 PM

Boxscore

Seattle SuperSonics 96, Sacramento Kings 89
Scoring by quarter: 26–28, 22–22, 16–23, 32–16
Pts: Sam Perkins 17; Rebs: Shawn Kemp 9 Asts: Gary Payton 7	Pts: Mitch Richmond 24; Rebs: Olden Polynice 14; Asts: Billy Owens 6
Seattle leads series, 2–1

ARCO Arena, Sacramento, California
Attendance: 17,317
Referees: Dan Crawford, Joe Forte, Greg Willard

TBS

May 2
10:30 PM

Boxscore

Seattle SuperSonics 101, Sacramento Kings 87
Scoring by quarter: 25–22, 25–26, 27–21, 24–18
Pts: Gary Payton 29; Rebs: Detlef Schrempf 10; Asts: Detlef Schrempf 9	Pts: Lionel Simmons 24; Rebs: Polynice, Smith 9 each Asts: Lionel Simmons 3
Seattle wins series, 3–1

ARCO Arena, Sacramento, California
Attendance: 17,317
Referees: Ron Garretson, Steve Javie, Eddie F. Rush

Regular-season series
Seattle won 4–0 in the regular-season series

December 8, 1995

Recap

Seattle SuperSonics 120, Sacramento Kings 103

ARCO Arena, Sacramento, California

February 24, 1996

Recap

Sacramento Kings 91, Seattle SuperSonics 104

KeyArena, Seattle

March 24, 1996

Recap

Seattle SuperSonics 112, Sacramento Kings 110

ARCO Arena, Sacramento, California

April 10, 1996

Recap

Sacramento Kings 89, Seattle SuperSonics 108

KeyArena, Seattle

This was the first playoff meeting between the Kings and the SuperSonics.

==== (2) San Antonio Spurs vs. (7) Phoenix Suns ====
TNT

April 26
8:00 PM

Boxscore

Phoenix Suns 98, San Antonio Spurs 120
Scoring by quarter: 26–28, 18–30, 29–37, 25–25
Pts: Charles Barkley 26; Rebs: Charles Barkley 12; Asts: Kevin Johnson 11	Pts: Vinny Del Negro 29; Rebs: Will Perdue 9 Asts: Avery Johnson 18
San Antonio leads series, 1–0

Alamodome, San Antonio, Texas
Attendance: 16,545
Referees: Nolan Fine, Jess Kersey, Eddie F. Rush

NBC

April 28
3:00 PM

Boxscore

Phoenix Suns 105, San Antonio Spurs 110
Scoring by quarter: 25–23, 34–36, 25–26, 21–25
Pts: Charles Barkley 30; Rebs: Charles Barkley 20; Asts: Kevin Johnson 16	Pts: David Robinson 40; Rebs: David Robinson 21; Asts: Avery Johnson 15
San Antonio leads series, 2–0

Alamodome, San Antonio, Texas
Attendance: 19,507
Referees: Hue Hollins, Ed Middleton, Don Vaden

TNT

May 1
10:30 PM

Boxscore

San Antonio Spurs 93, Phoenix Suns 94
Scoring by quarter: 26–23, 28–29, 17–24, 22–18
Pts: David Robinson 22; Rebs: Will Perdue 9 Asts: Vinny Del Negro 8	Pts: Charles Barkley 25; Rebs: Charles Barkley 13; Asts: Kevin Johnson 8
San Antonio leads series, 2–1

America West Arena, Phoenix, Arizona
Attendance: 19,023
Referees: Bob Delaney, Ed T. Rush, Greg Willard

TNT

May 3
9:00 PM

Boxscore

San Antonio Spurs 116, Phoenix Suns 98
Scoring by quarter: 28–26, 24–25, 33–18, 31–29
Pts: David Robinson 30; Rebs: David Robinson 13; Asts: Avery Johnson 13	Pts: Charles Barkley 21; Rebs: Charles Barkley 9 Asts: Kevin Johnson 8
San Antonio wins series, 3–1

America West Arena, Phoenix, Arizona
Attendance: 19,023
Referees: Hugh Evans, Bernie Fryer, Bennett Salvatore

Regular-season series
San Antonio won 3–1 in the regular-season series

December 2, 1995

Recap

Phoenix Suns 93, San Antonio Spurs 101

Alamodome, San Antonio

December 25, 1995

Recap

San Antonio Spurs 105, Phoenix Suns 100

America West Arena, Phoenix, Arizona

March 31, 1996

Recap

Phoenix Suns 83, San Antonio Spurs 97

Alamodome, San Antonio

April 2, 1996

Recap

San Antonio Spurs 104, Phoenix Suns 111

America West Arena, Phoenix, Arizona

This was the third playoff meeting between these two teams, with the Suns winning the first two meetings.

Previous playoff series
Phoenix leads 2–0 in all-time playoff series

1992

Phoenix Suns 3, San Antonio Spurs 0

1992 Western Conference First Round

1993

Phoenix Suns 4, San Antonio Spurs 2

1993 Western Conference Semifinals

==== (3) Utah Jazz vs. (6) Portland Trail Blazers ====
TBS

April 25
9:30 PM

Boxscore

Portland Trail Blazers 102, Utah Jazz 110
Scoring by quarter: 26–30, 30–14, 25–29, 21–37
Pts: Rod Strickland 27; Rebs: Chris Dudley 10; Asts: Rod Strickland 12	Pts: Karl Malone 33; Rebs: Karl Malone 9 Asts: John Stockton 23
Utah leads series, 1–0

Delta Center, Salt Lake City, Utah
Attendance: 19,614
Referees: Terry Durham, Hugh Evans, Bernie Fryer

TNT

April 27
10:30 PM

Boxscore

Portland Trail Blazers 90, Utah Jazz 105
Scoring by quarter: 27–30, 23–20, 28–27, 12–28
Pts: Arvydas Sabonis 26; Rebs: Arvydas Sabonis 12; Asts: Rod Strickland 7	Pts: Karl Malone 30; Rebs: Karl Malone 14; Asts: John Stockton 16
Utah leads series, 2–0

Delta Center, Salt Lake City, Utah
Attendance: 19,911
Referees: Dick Bavetta, Ken Mauer, Ronnie Nunn

TNT

April 29
10:30 PM

Boxscore

Utah Jazz 91, Portland Trail Blazers 94 (OT)
Scoring by quarter: 17–11, 14–26, 28–26, 24–20, Overtime: 8–11
Pts: Karl Malone 35; Rebs: David Benoit 11; Asts: John Stockton 11	Pts: Arvydas Sabonis 27; Rebs: Arvydas Sabonis 12; Asts: Rod Strickland 8
Utah leads series, 2–1

Rose Garden, Portland, Oregon
Attendance: 21,401
Referees: Bob Delaney, Jess Kersey, Derrick Stafford

TNT

May 1
9:30 PM

Boxscore

Utah Jazz 90, Portland Trail Blazers 98
Scoring by quarter: 17–27, 23–27, 24–20, 26–24
Pts: Jeff Hornacek 30; Rebs: Malone, Morris 6 each Asts: John Stockton 11	Pts: Rod Strickland 27; Rebs: Arvydas Sabonis 13; Asts: Rod Strickland 7
Series tied, 2–2

Rose Garden, Portland, Oregon
Attendance: 21,401
Referees: Dan Crawford, Joe DeRosa, Joe Forte

NBC

May 5
3:00 PM

Boxscore

Portland Trail Blazers 64, Utah Jazz 102
Scoring by quarter: 12–18, 12–28, 14–24, 26–32
Pts: Arvydas Sabonis 14; Rebs: Arvydas Sabonis 8 Asts: Rod Strickland 8	Pts: Karl Malone 25; Rebs: Karl Malone 10; Asts: John Stockton 11
Utah wins series, 3–2

Delta Center, Salt Lake City, Utah
Attendance: 19,682
Referees: Ron Garretson, Steve Javie, Ed T. Rush

Regular-season series
Utah won 3–1 in the regular-season series

November 5, 1995

Recap

Utah Jazz 105, Portland Trail Blazers 109

Rose Garden Arena, Portland, Oregon

December 26, 1995

Recap

Portland Trail Blazers 104, Utah Jazz 114

Delta Center, Salt Lake City

January 23, 1996

Recap

Portland Trail Blazers 72, Utah Jazz 96

Delta Center, Salt Lake City

January 31, 1996

Recap

Utah Jazz 98, Portland Trail Blazers 94

Rose Garden Arena, Portland, Oregon

This was the fourth playoff meeting between these two teams, with the Trail Blazers winning two of the first three meetings.

Previous playoff series
Portland leads 2–1 in all-time playoff series

1988

Portland Trail Blazers 1, Utah Jazz 3

1988 Western Conference First Round

1991

Portland Trail Blazers 4, Utah Jazz 1

1991 Western Conference Semifinals

1992

Portland Trail Blazers 4, Utah Jazz 2

1992 Western Conference Finals

==== (4) Los Angeles Lakers vs. (5) Houston Rockets ====
TNT

April 25
10:30 PM

Boxscore

Houston Rockets 87, Los Angeles Lakers 83
Scoring by quarter: 21–22, 19–17, 25–27, 22–17
Pts: Hakeem Olajuwon 33; Rebs: Olajuwon, Horry 8 each Asts: Drexler, Smith 4 each	Pts: Cedric Ceballos 22; Rebs: Cedric Ceballos 12; Asts: Nick Van Exel 8
Houston leads series, 1–0

Great Western Forum, Inglewood, California
Attendance: 17,505
Referees: Dick Bavetta, Ken Mauer, Ronnie Nunn

NBC

April 27
3:30 PM

Boxscore

Houston Rockets 94, Los Angeles Lakers 104
Scoring by quarter: 11–24, 31–25, 27–25, 25–30
Pts: Sam Cassell 22; Rebs: Horry, Olajuwon 7 each Asts: Sam Cassell 8	Pts: Magic Johnson 26; Rebs: Vlade Divac 12; Asts: Magic Johnson 5
Series tied, 1–1

Great Western Forum, Inglewood, California
Attendance: 17,505
Referees: Terry Durham, Hugh Evans, Bernie Fryer

TBS

April 30
9:00 PM

Boxscore

Los Angeles Lakers 98, Houston Rockets 104
Scoring by quarter: 28–34, 27–22, 20–24, 23–24
Pts: Elden Campbell 18; Rebs: Elden Campbell 10; Asts: Magic Johnson 13	Pts: Hakeem Olajuwon 30; Rebs: Robert Horry 10; Asts: Clyde Drexler 11
Houston leads series, 2–1

The Summit, Houston, Texas
Attendance: 16,285
Referees: Steve Javie, Eddie F. Rush, Don Vaden

TNT

May 2
9:30 PM

Boxscore

Los Angeles Lakers 94, Houston Rockets 102
Scoring by quarter: 29–35, 22–23, 25–25, 18–19
Pts: Cedric Ceballos 25; Rebs: Cedric Ceballos 12; Asts: Nick Van Exel 11	Pts: Hakeem Olajuwon 25; Rebs: Hakeem Olajuwon 11; Asts: Olajuwon, Drexler 7 each
Houston wins series, 3–1

The Summit, Houston, Texas
Attendance: 16,285
Referees: Jim Clark, Jess Kersey, Ed Middleton

Game 4 is Magic Johnson's final NBA game.

Regular-season series
Houston won 3–1 in the regular-season series

December 6, 1995

Recap

Los Angeles Lakers 99, Houston Rockets 112

The Summit, Houston

January 12, 1996

Recap

Houston Rockets 100, Los Angeles Lakers 101

Great Western Forum, Inglewood, California

February 24, 1996

Recap

Los Angeles Lakers 94, Houston Rockets 96

The Summit, Houston

March 3, 1996

Recap

Houston Rockets 111, Los Angeles Lakers 107

Great Western Forum, Inglewood, California

This was the fifth playoff meeting between these two teams, with each team winning two series apiece.

Previous playoff series
Tied 2–2 in all-time playoff series

1981

Houston Rockets 2, Los Angeles Lakers 1

1981 Western Conference First Round

1986

Houston Rockets 4, Los Angeles Lakers 1

1986 Western Conference Finals

1990

Houston Rockets 1, Los Angeles Lakers 3

1990 Western Conference First Round

1991

Houston Rockets 0, Los Angeles Lakers 3

1991 Western Conference First Round

== Conference semifinals ==
=== Eastern Conference semifinals ===
==== (1) Chicago Bulls vs. (5) New York Knicks ====
NBC

May 5
5:30 PM

Boxscore

New York Knicks 84, Chicago Bulls 91
Scoring by quarter: 17–25, 30–29, 22–19, 15–18
Pts: Patrick Ewing 21; Rebs: Patrick Ewing 16; Asts: Derek Harper 5	Pts: Michael Jordan 44; Rebs: Dennis Rodman 12; Asts: Scottie Pippen 7
Chicago leads series, 1–0

United Center, Chicago, Illinois
Attendance: 24,394
Referees: Joe Crawford, Eddie F. Rush, Don Vaden

TNT

May 7
9:30 PM

Boxscore

New York Knicks 80, Chicago Bulls 91
Scoring by quarter: 19–22, 22–20, 18–19, 21–30
Pts: Patrick Ewing 23; Rebs: Charles Oakley 11; Asts: Derek Harper 5	Pts: Michael Jordan 28; Rebs: Dennis Rodman 19; Asts: Scottie Pippen 6
Chicago leads series, 2–0

United Center, Chicago, Illinois
Attendance: 24,328
Referees: Bernie Fryer, Jess Kersey, Jack Nies

NBC

May 11
1:00 PM

Boxscore

Chicago Bulls 99, New York Knicks 102 (OT)
Scoring by quarter: 17–25, 21–18, 20–19, 30–26, Overtime: 11–14
Pts: Michael Jordan 46; Rebs: Dennis Rodman 16; Asts: Scottie Pippen 6	Pts: John Starks 30; Rebs: Oakley, Ewing 13 each Asts: John Starks 6
Chicago leads series, 2–1

Madison Square Garden, New York City, New York
Attendance: 19,763
Referees: Joe DeRosa, Hue Hollins, Ed T. Rush

Down by 8 late in the 4th quarter, Michael Jordan leads the Bulls on a personal 8–0 run including hitting the game-tying 3 with 19.4 seconds left to force OT

NBC

May 12
5:30 PM

Boxscore

Chicago Bulls 94, New York Knicks 91
Scoring by quarter: 24–28, 27–22, 26–18, 17–23
Pts: Michael Jordan 27; Rebs: Dennis Rodman 19; Asts: Michael Jordan 8	Pts: Patrick Ewing 29; Rebs: Patrick Ewing 10; Asts: Derek Harper 5
Chicago leads series, 3–1

Madison Square Garden, New York City, New York
Attendance: 19,763
Referees: Mike Mathis, Ed Middleton, Bill Oakes

Bill Wennington hits the game-winner with 36.9 seconds left.

TNT

May 14
9:30 PM

Boxscore

New York Knicks 81, Chicago Bulls 94
Scoring by quarter: 18–18, 18–24, 23–26, 22–26
Pts: Patrick Ewing 22; Rebs: Charles Oakley 13; Asts: Derek Harper 6	Pts: Michael Jordan 35; Rebs: Dennis Rodman 12; Asts: Jordan, R. Harper 5 each
Chicago wins series, 4–1

United Center, Chicago, Illinois
Attendance: 24,396
Referees: Dick Bavetta, Steve Javie, Ronnie Nunn

Regular-season series
Chicago won 3–1 in the regular-season series

December 6, 1995

Recap

New York Knicks 94, Chicago Bulls 101

United Center, Chicago, Illinois

January 23, 1996

Recap

Chicago Bulls 99, New York Knicks 79

Madison Square Garden, New York City

March 10, 1996

Recap

Chicago Bulls 72, New York Knicks 104

Madison Square Garden, New York City

March 21, 1996

Recap

New York Knicks 86, Chicago Bulls 107

United Center, Chicago, Illinois

This was the seventh playoff meeting between these two teams, with the Bulls winning five of the first six meetings.

Previous playoff series
Chicago leads 5–1 in all-time playoff series

1981

Chicago Bulls 2, New York Knicks 0

1981 Eastern Conference First Round

1989

Chicago Bulls 4, New York Knicks 2

1989 Eastern Conference Semifinals

1991

Chicago Bulls 3, New York Knicks 0

1991 Eastern Conference First Round

1992

Chicago Bulls 4, New York Knicks 3

1992 Eastern Conference Semifinals

1993

Chicago Bulls 4, New York Knicks 2

1993 Eastern Conference Finals

1994

Chicago Bulls 3, New York Knicks 4

1994 Eastern Conference Semifinals

==== (2) Orlando Magic vs. (6) Atlanta Hawks ====
TNT

May 8
8:00 PM

Boxscore

Atlanta Hawks 105, Orlando Magic 117
Scoring by quarter: 24–29, 32–33, 24–30, 25–25
Pts: Stacey Augmon 23; Rebs: Alan Henderson 8 Asts: Steve Smith 9	Pts: Shaquille O'Neal 41; Rebs: Shaquille O'Neal 13; Asts: O'Neal, Hardaway 6 each
Orlando leads series, 1–0

Orlando Arena, Orlando, Florida
Attendance: 17,248
Referees: Joe Crawford, Ronnie Nunn, Bennett Salvatore

TNT

May 10
7:00 PM

Boxscore

Atlanta Hawks 94, Orlando Magic 120
Scoring by quarter: 19–36, 27–31, 20–22, 28–31
Pts: Mookie Blaylock 25; Rebs: Christian Laettner 6 Asts: Steve Smith 5	Pts: Shaquille O'Neal 28; Rebs: Horace Grant 11; Asts: Penny Hardaway 7
Orlando leads series, 2–0

Orlando Arena, Orlando, Florida
Attendance: 17,248
Referees: Hugh Evans, Joe Forte, Don Vaden

NBC

May 12
12:30 PM

Boxscore

Orlando Magic 103, Atlanta Hawks 96
Scoring by quarter: 31–30, 23–21, 28–31, 21–14
Pts: Shaquille O'Neal 24; Rebs: Shaquille O'Neal 12; Asts: Penny Hardaway 6	Pts: Christian Laettner 26; Rebs: Grant Long 13; Asts: Mookie Blaylock 8
Orlando leads series, 3–0

Omni Coliseum, Atlanta, Georgia
Attendance: 15,476
Referees: Dick Bavetta, Steve Javie, Jack Nies

TNT

May 13
8:00 PM

Boxscore

Orlando Magic 99, Atlanta Hawks 104
Scoring by quarter: 29–44, 18–23, 36–15, 16–22
Pts: Grant, Hardaway 29 each Rebs: Horace Grant 20; Asts: Penny Hardaway 11	Pts: Steve Smith 35; Rebs: Grant Long 7 Asts: Mookie Blaylock 11
Orlando leads series, 3–1

Omni Coliseum, Atlanta, Georgia
Attendance: 12,645
Referees: Dan Crawford, Joe DeRosa, Ed T. Rush

TNT

May 15
8:00 PM

Boxscore

Atlanta Hawks 88, Orlando Magic 96
Scoring by quarter: 20–22, 27–30, 26–25, 15–19
Pts: Grant Long 24; Rebs: Grant Long 13; Asts: Mookie Blaylock 7	Pts: Shaquille O'Neal 27; Rebs: Shaquille O'Neal 15; Asts: O'Neal, Scott 4 each
Orlando wins series, 4–1

Orlando Arena, Orlando, Florida
Attendance: 17,248
Referees: Bob Delaney, Hue Hollins, Mike Mathis

Regular-season series
Tied 2–2 in the regular-season series

November 4, 1995

Recap

Orlando Magic 91, Atlanta Hawks 124

The Omni, Atlanta

January 26, 1996

Recap

Orlando Magic 84, Atlanta Hawks 96

The Omni, Atlanta

February 2, 1996

Recap

Atlanta Hawks 95, Orlando Magic 108

Orlando Arena, Orlando, Florida

April 18, 1996

Recap

Atlanta Hawks 104, Orlando Magic 119

Orlando Arena, Orlando, Florida

This was the first playoff meeting between the Hawks and the Magic.

=== Western Conference semifinals ===
==== (1) Seattle SuperSonics vs. (5) Houston Rockets ====
NBC

May 4
3:30 PM

Boxscore

Houston Rockets 75, Seattle SuperSonics 108
Scoring by quarter: 28–29, 16–15, 15–29, 16–35
Pts: Robert Horry 18; Rebs: Clyde Drexler 9 Asts: Kenny Smith 5	Pts: Gary Payton 28; Rebs: Shawn Kemp 12; Asts: Gary Payton 7
Seattle leads series, 1–0

KeyArena, Seattle, Washington
Attendance: 17,072
Referees: Terry Durham, Mike Mathis, Ronnie Nunn

TNT

May 6
9:00 PM

Boxscore

Houston Rockets 101, Seattle SuperSonics 105
Scoring by quarter: 19–22, 32–27, 31–31, 19–25
Pts: Clyde Drexler 19; Rebs: Hakeem Olajuwon 16; Asts: Kenny Smith 7	Pts: Detlef Schrempf 21; Rebs: Schrempf, Kemp 10 each Asts: Schrempf, Payton 5 each
Seattle leads series, 2–0

KeyArena, Seattle, Washington
Attendance: 17,072
Referees: Hugh Evans, Paul Mihalak, Bill Oakes

TNT

May 10
9:30 PM

Boxscore

Seattle SuperSonics 115, Houston Rockets 112
Scoring by quarter: 28–37, 34–29, 28–18, 25–28
Pts: Gary Payton 28; Rebs: Shawn Kemp 18; Asts: Gary Payton 8	Pts: Clyde Drexler 28; Rebs: Hakeem Olajuwon 13; Asts: Kenny Smith 11
Seattle leads series, 3–0

The Summit, Houston, Texas
Attendance: 16,285
Referees: Dick Bavetta, Steve Javie, Eddie F. Rush

NBC

May 12
3:00 PM

Boxscore

Seattle SuperSonics 114, Houston Rockets 107 (OT)
Scoring by quarter: 26–18, 31–25, 26–23, 18–35, Overtime: 13–6
Pts: Shawn Kemp 32; Rebs: Shawn Kemp 15; Asts: Gary Payton 11	Pts: Hakeem Olajuwon 26; Rebs: Clyde Drexler 15; Asts: Drexler, Cassell 6 each
Seattle wins series, 4–0

The Summit, Houston, Texas
Attendance: 16,611
Referees: Joe Crawford, Bernie Fryer, Ron Garretson

Regular-season series
Seattle won 4–0 in the regular-season series

February 3, 1996

Recap

Seattle SuperSonics 104, Houston Rockets 103

The Summit, Houston

February 6, 1996

Recap

Houston Rockets 94, Seattle SuperSonics 99

KeyArena, Seattle

April 3, 1996

Recap

Houston Rockets 103, Seattle SuperSonics 118

KeyArena, Seattle

April 15, 1996

Recap

Seattle SuperSonics 112, Houston Rockets 106

The Summit, Houston

This was the fifth playoff meeting between these two teams, with the SuperSonics winning the first four meetings. The SuperSonics defeated the two-time defending NBA champion Rockets to return to the Western Conference Finals for the second time in four years.

Previous playoff series
Seattle leads 4–0 in all-time playoff series

1982

Houston Rockets 1, Seattle SuperSonics 2

1982 Western Conference First Round

1987

Houston Rockets 2, Seattle SuperSonics 4

1987 Western Conference Semifinals

1989

Houston Rockets 0, Seattle SuperSonics 3

1989 Western Conference First Round

1993

Houston Rockets 3, Seattle SuperSonics 4

1993 Western Conference Semifinals

==== (2) San Antonio Spurs vs. (3) Utah Jazz ====
TNT

May 7
7:00 PM

Boxscore

Utah Jazz 95, San Antonio Spurs 75
Scoring by quarter: 29–18, 17–23, 28–20, 21–14
Pts: Karl Malone 23; Rebs: Karl Malone 7 Asts: John Stockton 19	Pts: David Robinson 29; Rebs: Will Perdue 7 Asts: Avery Johnson 5
Utah leads series, 1–0

Alamodome, San Antonio, Texas
Attendance: 15,112
Referees: Dick Bavetta, Dan Crawford, Derrick Stafford

TNT

May 9
8:00 PM

Boxscore

Utah Jazz 77, San Antonio Spurs 88
Scoring by quarter: 9–25, 29–11, 16–27, 23–25
Pts: Karl Malone 24; Rebs: Malone, Ostertag 8 each Asts: John Stockton 13	Pts: David Robinson 24; Rebs: David Robinson 12; Asts: Avery Johnson 10
Series tied, 1–1

Alamodome, San Antonio, Texas
Attendance: 18,635
Referees: Hue Hollins, Mike Mathis, Ron Olesiak

NBC

May 11
3:30 PM

Boxscore

San Antonio Spurs 75, Utah Jazz 105
Scoring by quarter: 20–32, 22–19, 16–32, 17–22
Pts: Sean Elliott 17; Rebs: David Robinson 9 Asts: Avery Johnson 10	Pts: Karl Malone 32; Rebs: Karl Malone 11; Asts: John Stockton 7
Utah leads series, 2–1

Delta Center, Salt Lake City, Utah
Attendance: 19,911
Referees: Terry Durham, Jess Kersey, Bennett Salvatore

TNT

May 12
8:30 PM

Boxscore

San Antonio Spurs 86, Utah Jazz 101
Scoring by quarter: 20–24, 22–29, 32–30, 12–18
Pts: Sean Elliott 22; Rebs: Chuck Person 6 Asts: Avery Johnson 8	Pts: Chris Morris 25; Rebs: Adam Keefe 7 Asts: John Stockton 10
Utah leads series, 3–1

Delta Center, Salt Lake City, Utah
Attendance: 19,911
Referees: Bob Delaney, Hugh Evans, Joe Forte

TBS

May 14
9:00 PM

Boxscore

Utah Jazz 87, San Antonio Spurs 98
Scoring by quarter: 16–26, 19–19, 18–23, 34–30
Pts: Karl Malone 24; Rebs: Karl Malone 12; Asts: John Stockton 8	Pts: David Robinson 24; Rebs: David Robinson 15; Asts: Sean Elliott 8
Utah leads series, 3–2

Alamodome, San Antonio, Texas
Attendance: 34,215
Referees: Joe Crawford, Ron Garretson, Bill Oakes

TNT

May 16
9:00 PM

Boxscore

San Antonio Spurs 81, Utah Jazz 108
Scoring by quarter: 17–22, 21–29, 23–27, 20–30
Pts: Del Negro, Robinson 17 each Rebs: David Robinson 8 Asts: Avery Johnson 8	Pts: Karl Malone 25; Rebs: Karl Malone 13; Asts: John Stockton 13
Utah wins series, 4–2

Delta Center, Salt Lake City, Utah
Attendance: 19,911
Referees: Steve Javie, Jack Nies, Ed T. Rush

Regular-season series
San Antonio won 3–1 in the regular-season series

January 3, 1996

Recap

Utah Jazz 97, San Antonio Spurs 111

Alamodome, San Antonio

January 12, 1996

Recap

San Antonio Spurs 101, Utah Jazz 94

Delta Center, Salt Lake City

February 13, 1996

Recap

Utah Jazz 114, San Antonio Spurs 111

Alamodome, San Antonio

April 8, 1996

Recap

San Antonio Spurs 92, Utah Jazz 91

Delta Center, Salt Lake City

This was the second playoff meeting between these two teams, with the Jazz winning the first meeting.

Previous playoff series
Utah leads 1–0 in all-time playoff series

1994

San Antonio Spurs 1, Utah Jazz 3

1994 Western Conference First Round

== Conference finals ==
=== Eastern Conference finals ===
==== (1) Chicago Bulls vs. (2) Orlando Magic ====
NBC

May 19
3:30 PM

Boxscore

Orlando Magic 83, Chicago Bulls 121
Scoring by quarter: 19–32, 26–23, 14–26, 24–40
Pts: Penny Hardaway 38; Rebs: Shaquille O'Neal 6 Asts: Shaquille O'Neal 6	Pts: Michael Jordan 21; Rebs: Dennis Rodman 21; Asts: Toni Kukoč 10
Chicago leads series, 1–0

United Center, Chicago, Illinois
Attendance: 24,411
Referees: Hugh Evans, Ron Garretson, Bennett Salvatore

TNT

May 21
8:30 PM

Boxscore

Orlando Magic 88, Chicago Bulls 93
Scoring by quarter: 23–20, 30–18, 16–29, 19–26
Pts: Shaquille O'Neal 36; Rebs: Shaquille O'Neal 16; Asts: Brian Shaw 6	Pts: Michael Jordan 35; Rebs: Dennis Rodman 12; Asts: Scottie Pippen 9
Chicago leads series, 2–0

United Center, Chicago, Illinois
Attendance: 24,395
Referees: Joe Crawford, Ed Middleton, Bill Oakes

Chicago overcame an 18-point deficit to win (64–46).

NBC

May 25
3:30 PM

Boxscore

Chicago Bulls 86, Orlando Magic 67
Scoring by quarter: 23–20, 25–18, 15–19, 23–10
Pts: Scottie Pippen 27; Rebs: Dennis Rodman 16; Asts: Scottie Pippen 7	Pts: Penny Hardaway 18; Rebs: Shaquille O'Neal 12; Asts: O'Neal, Hardaway 3 each
Chicago leads series, 3–0

Orlando Arena, Orlando, Florida
Attendance: 17,248
Referees: Steve Javie, Eddie F. Rush, Ed T. Rush

NBC

May 27
3:30 PM

Boxscore

Chicago Bulls 106, Orlando Magic 101
Scoring by quarter: 23–31, 24–25, 28–18, 31–27
Pts: Michael Jordan 45; Rebs: Dennis Rodman 14; Asts: Scottie Pippen 8	Pts: Hardaway, O'Neal 28 each Rebs: Shaquille O'Neal 9 Asts: Penny Hardaway 8
Chicago wins series, 4–0

Orlando Arena, Orlando, Florida
Attendance: 17,248
Referees: Dick Bavetta, Dan Crawford, Hue Hollins

Regular-season series
Chicago won 3–1 in the regular-season series

November 14, 1995

Recap

Chicago Bulls 88, Orlando Magic 94

Orlando Arena, Orlando, Florida

December 13, 1995

Recap

Orlando Magic 103, Chicago Bulls 112

United Center, Chicago, Illinois

February 25, 1996

Recap

Orlando Magic 91, Chicago Bulls 111

United Center, Chicago, Illinois

April 7, 1996

Recap

Chicago Bulls 90, Orlando Magic 86

Orlando Arena, Orlando, Florida

This was the second playoff meeting between these two teams, with the Magic winning the first meeting.

Previous playoff series
Orlando leads 1–0 in all-time playoff series

1995

Chicago Bulls 2, Orlando Magic 4

1995 Eastern Conference Semifinals

=== Western Conference finals ===
==== (1) Seattle SuperSonics vs. (3) Utah Jazz ====
The SuperSonics led the series 3–1 after an 88–86 victory at the Delta Center in Game 4. However, the Jazz shocked the Sonics in Seattle in Game 5 98-95 and would handily win Game 6 118–83, Seattle's worst playoff loss in team history. Game 7 was a close affair and the Sonics pulled away late to win 90-86 and advance to their first NBA Finals since 1979.

NBC

May 18
3:30 PM

Boxscore

Utah Jazz 72, Seattle SuperSonics 102
Scoring by quarter: 23–24, 16–30, 21–23, 12–25
Pts: Karl Malone 21; Rebs: Karl Malone 8 Asts: John Stockton 7	Pts: Payton, Kemp 21 each Rebs: Shawn Kemp 11; Asts: Gary Payton 7
Seattle leads series, 1–0

KeyArena, Seattle, Washington
Attendance: 17,072
Referees: Dick Bavetta, Dan Crawford, Eddie F. Rush

TNT

May 20
9:00 PM

Boxscore

Utah Jazz 87, Seattle SuperSonics 91
Scoring by quarter: 22–17, 20–25, 31–23, 14–26
Pts: Karl Malone 32; Rebs: Karl Malone 13; Asts: John Stockton 7	Pts: Gary Payton 18; Rebs: Nate McMillan 5 Asts: Gary Payton 8
Seattle leads series, 2–0

KeyArena, Seattle, Washington
Attendance: 17,072
Referees: Joe Forte, Jess Kersey, Ronnie Nunn

TNT

May 24
9:00 PM

Boxscore

Seattle SuperSonics 76, Utah Jazz 96
Scoring by quarter: 27–24, 20–27, 18–21, 11–24
Pts: Gary Payton 25; Rebs: Payton, Hawkins 6 each Asts: Gary Payton 3	Pts: Malone, Hornacek 28 each Rebs: Karl Malone 18; Asts: Jeff Hornacek 8
Seattle leads series, 2–1

Delta Center, Salt Lake City, Utah
Attendance: 19,911
Referees: Hue Hollins, Mike Mathis, Jack Nies

NBC

May 26
3:30 PM

Boxscore

Seattle SuperSonics 88, Utah Jazz 86
Scoring by quarter: 17–21, 32–23, 24–21, 15–21
Pts: Gary Payton 19; Rebs: Shawn Kemp 8 Asts: Gary Payton 6	Pts: Karl Malone 25; Rebs: Karl Malone 12; Asts: Malone, Stockton 8 each
Seattle leads series, 3–1

Delta Center, Salt Lake City, Utah
Attendance: 19,911
Referees: Hugh Evans, Ron Garretson, Bennett Salvatore

NBC

May 28
9:00 PM

Boxscore

Utah Jazz 98, Seattle SuperSonics 95 (OT)
Scoring by quarter: 17–26, 35–23, 19–22, 19–19, Overtime: 8–5
Pts: Karl Malone 29; Rebs: Karl Malone 15; Asts: John Stockton 6	Pts: Gary Payton 31; Rebs: Shawn Kemp 13; Asts: Gary Payton 6
Seattle leads series, 3–2

KeyArena, Seattle, Washington
Attendance: 17,072
Referees: Joe Crawford, Ed Middleton, Bill Oakes

NBC

May 30
9:00 PM

Boxscore

Seattle SuperSonics 83, Utah Jazz 118
Scoring by quarter: 22–35, 25–24, 20–27, 16–32
Pts: Shawn Kemp 26; Rebs: Shawn Kemp 14; Asts: Gary Payton 7	Pts: Karl Malone 32; Rebs: Karl Malone 10; Asts: John Stockton 12
Series tied, 3–3

Delta Center, Salt Lake City, Utah
Attendance: 19,911
Referees: Steve Javie, Jess Kersey, Ed T. Rush

NBC

June 2
7:30 PM

Boxscore

Utah Jazz 86, Seattle SuperSonics 90
Scoring by quarter: 21–21, 20–23, 26–29, 19–17
Pts: Malone, Stockton 22 each Rebs: John Stockton 8 Asts: Malone, Stockton 7 each	Pts: Shawn Kemp 26; Rebs: Shawn Kemp 14; Asts: Gary Payton 5
Seattle wins series, 4–3

KeyArena, Seattle, Washington
Attendance: 17,072
Referees: Dick Bavetta, Hugh Evans, Mike Mathis

Regular-season series
Seattle won 3–1 in the regular-season series

November 3, 1995

Recap

Seattle SuperSonics 94, Utah Jazz 112

Delta Center, Salt Lake City

January 26, 1996

Recap

Utah Jazz 93, Seattle SuperSonics 94

KeyArena, Seattle

March 30, 1996

Recap

Utah Jazz 98, Seattle SuperSonics 100

KeyArena, Seattle

April 2, 1996

Recap

Seattle SuperSonics 100, Utah Jazz 91

Delta Center, Salt Lake City

This was the third playoff meeting between these two teams, with each team winning one series apiece.

Previous playoff series
Tied 1–1 in all-time playoff series

1992

Seattle SuperSonics 1, Utah Jazz 4

1992 Western Conference Semifinals

1993

Seattle SuperSonics 3, Utah Jazz 2

1993 Western Conference First Round

== NBA Finals: (E1) Chicago Bulls vs. (W1) Seattle SuperSonics ==
- Seattle battled to a Game 6 after trailing 3–0 in the series, only the second team in NBA Finals history to do so (1951 New York Knicks forced a Game 7).

NBC

June 5
9:00 PM

Boxscore

Seattle SuperSonics 90, Chicago Bulls 107
Scoring by quarter: 18–24, 30–29, 29–26, 13–28
Pts: Shawn Kemp 32; Rebs: Gary Payton 10; Asts: Gary Payton 6	Pts: Michael Jordan 28; Rebs: Dennis Rodman 13; Asts: Ron Harper 7
Chicago leads series, 1–0

United Center, Chicago, Illinois
Attendance: 24,544
Referees: Dan Crawford, Joe Crawford, Bennett Salvatore

NBC

June 7
9:00 PM

Boxscore

Seattle SuperSonics 88, Chicago Bulls 92
Scoring by quarter: 27–23, 18–23, 20–30, 23–16
Pts: Shawn Kemp 29; Rebs: Shawn Kemp 13; Asts: Payton, Schrempf 3 each	Pts: Michael Jordan 29; Rebs: Dennis Rodman 20; Asts: Michael Jordan 8
Chicago leads series, 2–0

United Center, Chicago, Illinois
Attendance: 24,544
Referees: Hue Hollins, Jess Kersey, Ed T. Rush

NBC

June 9
7:30 PM

Boxscore

Chicago Bulls 108, Seattle SuperSonics 86
Scoring by quarter: 34–16, 28–22, 13–23, 33–25
Pts: Michael Jordan 36; Rebs: Dennis Rodman 10; Asts: Scottie Pippen 9	Pts: Detlef Schrempf 20; Rebs: Payton, Brickowski 7 each Asts: Gary Payton 9
Chicago leads series, 3–0

KeyArena, Seattle, Washington
Attendance: 17,072
Referees: Dick Bavetta, Hugh Evans, Steve Javie

NBC

June 12
9:00 PM

Boxscore

Chicago Bulls 86, Seattle SuperSonics 107
Scoring by quarter: 21–25, 11–28, 31–31, 23–23
Pts: Michael Jordan 23; Rebs: Dennis Rodman 14; Asts: Scottie Pippen 8	Pts: Shawn Kemp 25; Rebs: Shawn Kemp 11; Asts: Gary Payton 11
Chicago leads series, 3–1

KeyArena, Seattle, Washington
Attendance: 17,072
Referees: Joe Crawford, Mike Mathis, Bill Oakes

NBC

June 14
9:00 PM

Boxscore

Chicago Bulls 78, Seattle SuperSonics 89
Scoring by quarter: 18–18, 24–25, 18–19, 18–27
Pts: Michael Jordan 26; Rebs: Dennis Rodman 12; Asts: Scottie Pippen 5	Pts: Gary Payton 23; Rebs: Shawn Kemp 10; Asts: Gary Payton 6
Chicago leads series, 3–2

KeyArena, Seattle, Washington
Attendance: 17,072
Referees: Hue Hollins, Jess Kersey, Ed T. Rush

NBC

June 16
7:30 PM

Boxscore

Seattle SuperSonics 75, Chicago Bulls 87
Scoring by quarter: 18–24, 20–21, 20–22, 17–20
Pts: Detlef Schrempf 23; Rebs: Shawn Kemp 14; Asts: Gary Payton 7	Pts: Michael Jordan 22; Rebs: Dennis Rodman 19; Asts: Michael Jordan 7
Chicago wins series, 4–2

United Center, Chicago, Illinois
Attendance: 24,544
Referees: Dick Bavetta, Hugh Evans, Steve Javie

Regular-season series
Tied 1–1 in the regular-season series

November 26, 1995

Recap

Chicago Bulls 92, Seattle SuperSonics 97

KeyArena, Seattle

January 10, 1996

Recap

Seattle SuperSonics 87, Chicago Bulls 113

United Center, Chicago, Illinois

This was the first playoff meeting between the Bulls and the SuperSonics.

== Statistical leaders ==
Category	Game high			Average			
Category	Player	Team	High	Player	Team	Avg.	GP
Points	Michael Jordan	Chicago Bulls	46	Michael Jordan	Chicago Bulls	30.7	18
Rebounds	Dennis Rodman; David Robinson	Chicago Bulls; San Antonio Spurs	21	Dennis Rodman	Chicago Bulls	13.7	18
Assists	John Stockton	Utah Jazz	23	John Stockton	Utah Jazz	10.8	18
Steals	Mookie Blaylock	Atlanta Hawks	8	Clyde Drexler; Robert Horry	Houston Rockets; Houston Rockets	2.6	8
Blocks	David Robinson; Greg Ostertag; Shawn Kemp; Patrick Ewing	San Antonio Spurs; Utah Jazz; Seattle SuperSonics; New York Knicks	5	Patrick Ewing	New York Knicks	3.1	8
