= 1995–96 Los Angeles Lakers season =

NBA professional basketball team season

- Head coach: Del Harris
- General manager: Jerry West
- Owner: Jerry Buss
- Arena: Great Western Forum

Results
- Record: 53–29 (.646)
- Place: Division: 2nd (Pacific); Conference: 4th (Western)
- Playoff finish: First round (lost to Rockets 1–3)
- Stats at Basketball Reference

Local media
- Television: KCAL-TV; Prime Sports West
- Radio: KLAC

The 1995–96 Los Angeles Lakers season was the 48th season for the Los Angeles Lakers in the National Basketball Association, and their 36th season in Los Angeles, California. It was also the highlight of retired All-Star guard, and Lakers legend Magic Johnson making a comeback at the age of 36; Johnson had retired from the NBA early into the 1991–92 season due to his HIV infection.

== Season summary ==
=== Off-season ===
During the off-season, the team signed free agents Corie Blount and Derek Strong.

=== Regular season ===
The Lakers got off to a slow start by losing three of their first four games of the regular season, and played around .500 in winning percentage with a 17–17 start to the season. The team soon recovered holding a 24–18 record before Johnson's arrival on January 30, 1996, in a 128–118 home win over the Golden State Warriors at the Great Western Forum; Johnson scored 19 points along with 8 rebounds, 10 assists and 2 steals in 27 minutes off the bench. The Lakers won ten of their twelve games in February, which included an eight-game winning streak, and held a 28–19 record at the All-Star break. The Lakers finished in second place in the Pacific Division with a 53–29 record, and earned the fourth seed in the Western Conference; it was their first 50-win season since the 1990–91 season.

Cedric Ceballos averaged 21.2 points and 6.9 rebounds per game, while Nick Van Exel provided the team with 14.9 points and 6.9 assists per game, and led them with 144 three-point field goals, and Johnson played a sixth man role off the bench, moving into the power forward position; he averaged 14.6 points, 5.7 rebounds and 6.9 assists per game in 32 games, starting in just nine of them. In addition, Elden Campbell averaged 13.9 points, 7.6 rebounds and 2.6 blocks per game, while Vlade Divac provided with 12.9 points, 8.6 rebounds and 1.7 blocks per game, and second-year guard Eddie Jones contributed 12.8 points, 3.5 assists and 1.8 steals per game. Also off the bench, Anthony Peeler contributed 9.7 points per game and 105 three-point field goals, while Sedale Threatt provided with 7.3 points and 3.3 assists per game, and George Lynch averaged 3.8 points and 2.8 rebounds per game.

Johnson finished in fifth place in Sixth Man of the Year voting, and also finished tied in twelfth place in Most Valuable Player voting, while Campbell finished in seventh place in Most Improved Player voting. Johnson also reached a milestone during the regular season, by passing his 10,000 career assist in a 102–89 road win over the Sacramento Kings, at the ARCO Arena II on March 7, 1996. The Lakers finished 21st in the NBA in home-game attendance, with an attendance of 649,634 at the Great Western Forum during the regular season.

=== NBA playoffs ===
In the Western Conference First Round of the 1996 NBA playoffs, the Lakers faced off against the 5th–seeded, and 2-time defending NBA champion Houston Rockets, a team that featured All-Star center Hakeem Olajuwon, All-Star guard Clyde Drexler, and Robert Horry. The Lakers lost Game 1 to the Rockets at home, 87–83 at the Great Western Forum, but managed to win Game 2 at home, 104–94 to even the series. However, the Lakers lost the next two games on the road, which included a Game 4 loss to the Rockets at The Summit, 102–94, thus losing the series in four games.

=== Notable incidents ===
This season was not without controversy. In March, after a home game against the Seattle SuperSonics, Ceballos missed the team's charter flight to Seattle, Washington without explanation, as the Lakers were scheduled to play the SuperSonics again; Ceballos went missing for a few days, but later on returned to the team, and was suspended without pay. Their troubles continued when Van Exel shoved a referee, during a road game against the Denver Nuggets at the McNichols Sports Arena on April 9, and was suspended for the final seven games of the regular season. Johnson was also suspended for three games for bumping into a referee during a home game against the Phoenix Suns on April 14.

=== Aftermath ===
Following the season, Johnson decided to retire for the second and final time, after the Lakers' loss to the Rockets in the opening round of the NBA playoffs. Meanwhile, Divac was traded to the Charlotte Hornets after seven seasons with the Lakers, Peeler and Lynch were both traded to the Vancouver Grizzlies, Strong signed as a free agent with the Orlando Magic, and Threatt was released to free agency.

== NBA draft ==
Round	Pick	Player	Position	Nationality	College
2	37	Frankie King	Guard	United States	Western Carolina

== Roster ==
1995–96 Los Angeles Lakers roster
Players

Pos.	No.	Player	Height	Weight	DOB	From
F	43	Corie Blount	6 ft 9 in (2.06 m)	240 lb (109 kg)	1969–01–04	Cincinnati
F	41	Elden Campbell	6 ft 11 in (2.11 m)	215 lb (98 kg)	1968–07–23	Clemson
F	23	Cedric Ceballos	6 ft 6 in (1.98 m)	190 lb (86 kg)	1969–08–02	Cal State Fullerton
C	12	Vlade Divac	7 ft 1 in (2.16 m)	243 lb (110 kg)	1968–02–03	Yugoslavia
F	32	Magic Johnson	6 ft 9 in (2.06 m)	215 lb (98 kg)	1959–08–14	Michigan State
G	25	Eddie Jones	6 ft 6 in (1.98 m)	190 lb (86 kg)	1971–10–20	Temple
G	4	Frankie King (injured)	6 ft 1 in (1.85 m)	185 lb (84 kg)	1972–06–06	Western Carolina
F	34	George Lynch	6 ft 8 in (2.03 m)	218 lb (99 kg)	1970–09–03	North Carolina
F	2	Anthony Miller (injured)	6 ft 9 in (2.06 m)	225 lb (102 kg)	1971–10–22	Michigan State
G	1	Anthony Peeler	6 ft 4 in (1.93 m)	208 lb (94 kg)	1969–11–25	Missouri
C	24	Fred Roberts	6 ft 10 in (2.08 m)	218 lb (99 kg)	1960–08–14	BYU
F	7	Derek Strong	6 ft 8 in (2.03 m)	220 lb (100 kg)	1968–02–09	Xavier
G	3	Sedale Threatt	6 ft 2 in (1.88 m)	175 lb (79 kg)	1961–09–10	West Virginia Tech
G	9	Nick Van Exel	6 ft 1 in (1.85 m)	170 lb (77 kg)	1971–11–27	Cincinnati

Coaches
Head coach
- Del Harris
Assistant(s)
- Bill Bertka
- Michael Cooper
- Larry Drew
- Kurt Rambis

Legend
- (DP) Unsigned draft pick
- (FA) Free agent
- (S) Suspended
- Injured

Roster

== Regular season ==
=== Magic's Comeback ===
In the 1995–96 NBA season, Johnson made a short-lived second comeback as a player from January 1996 to May 1996. In this time, he had bulked up from his self-reported weight of 235 lb in 1992, to 255 lb in order to play power forward, a much more physical position than his usual point guard role. At age 36, Johnson played the last 32 games of the season, averaging 14.6 points, 6.9 assists, and 5.7 rebounds per game. The Lakers lost to the Houston Rockets in the first round of the playoffs, and Johnson retired for good. Johnson explained his comeback with the words: "I'm going out on my terms, something I couldn't say when I aborted a comeback in 1992."

=== Season standings ===
Pacific Division	W	L	PCT	GB	Home	Road	Div
c-Seattle SuperSonics	64	18	.780	–	38–3	26–15	21–3
x-Los Angeles Lakers	53	29	.646	11	30–11	23–18	17–7
x-Portland Trail Blazers	44	38	.537	20	26–15	18–23	11–13
x-Phoenix Suns	41	41	.500	23	25–16	16–25	9–15
x-Sacramento Kings	39	43	.476	25	26–15	13–28	11–13
Golden State Warriors	36	46	.439	28	23–18	13–28	7–17
Los Angeles Clippers	29	53	.354	35	19–22	10–31	7–17

Western Conference
#	Team	W	L	PCT	GB	GP
1	c-Seattle SuperSonics *	64	18	.780	–	82
2	y-San Antonio Spurs *	59	23	.720	5	82
3	x-Utah Jazz	55	27	.671	9	82
4	x-Los Angeles Lakers	53	29	.646	11	82
5	x-Houston Rockets	48	34	.585	16	82
6	x-Portland Trail Blazers	44	38	.537	20	82
7	x-Phoenix Suns	41	41	.500	23	82
8	x-Sacramento Kings	39	43	.476	25	82
9	Golden State Warriors	36	46	.439	28	82
10	Denver Nuggets	35	47	.427	29	82
11	Los Angeles Clippers	29	53	.354	35	82
12	Minnesota Timberwolves	26	56	.317	38	82
13	Dallas Mavericks	26	56	.317	38	82
14	Vancouver Grizzlies	15	67	.183	49	82

== Game log ==
=== Regular season ===
1995–96 game log
Total: 53-29 (home: 30-11; road: 23–18)
November: 7–7 (home: 5–2; road: 2–5)

Game	Date	Team	Score	High points	High rebounds	High assists	Location Attendance	Record
1	November 3	Denver	W 98-96	Cedric Ceballos (26)	Vlade Divac (10)	Nick Van Exel (7)	Great Western Forum; 16,345	1–0
2	November 4	@ Seattle	L 89-103	Elden Campbell (24)	Elden Campbell (14)	3 players tied (2)	KeyArena; 17,102	1-1
3	November 7	@ Minnesota	L 92-93	Cedric Ceballos (27)	3 players tied (6)	Nick Van Exel (10)	Target Center; 14,756	1–2
4	November 8	@ Utah	L 98-108	Cedric Ceballos (26)	Cedric Ceballos (10)	Nick Van Exel (7)	Delta Center; 19,911	1–3
5	November 10	Seattle	W 100-97	Cedric Ceballos (32)	Cedric Ceballos (12)	Sedale Threatt (7)	Great Western Forum; 15,542	2–3
6	November 11	@ Golden State	L 105-123	Cedric Ceballos (25)	Cedric Ceballos (15)	Nick Van Exel (6)	Oakland-Alameda County Coliseum Arena; 15,025	2–4
7	November 14	@ Sacramento	W 106-100	Cedric Ceballos (31)	Elden Campbell (12)	Sedale Threatt (8)	ARCO Arena; 17,317	3–4
8	November 15	Dallas	W 114-97	Cedric Ceballos (31)	Cedric Ceballos (13)	Nick Van Exel (12)	Great Western Forum; 11,381	4-4
9	November 17	@ Vancouver	W 114-91	Nick Van Exel (25)	Cedric Ceballos (8)	Sedale Threatt (7)	General Motors Place; 19,193	5–4
10	November 19	L.A. Clippers	W 109-88	Cedric Ceballos (25)	Cedric Ceballos (13)	Nick Van Exel (9)	Great Western Forum; 15,617	6–4
11	November 21	Portland	L 108-109	Cedric Ceballos (38)	Vlade Divac (16)	Nick Van Exel (15)	Great Western Forum; 10,836	6–5
12	November 24	Sacramento	L 98-99	Cedric Ceballos (23)	Cedric Ceballos (11)	Nick Van Exel (8)	Great Western Forum; 16,343	6-6
13	November 25	@ Phoenix	L 113-114	Cedric Ceballos (34)	Elden Campbell (10)	Nick Van Exel (7)	American West Arena; 19,023	6–7
14	November 29	Phoenix	W 107-96	Cedric Ceballos (24)	3 players tied (9)	3 players tied (6)	Great Western Forum; 13,484	7-7

December: 9–8 (home: 6–1; road: 3–7)

Game	Date	Team	Score	High points	High rebounds	High assists	Location Attendance	Record
15	December 1	Vancouver	W 113-100	Cedric Ceballos (22)	Vlade Divac (13)	Nick Van Exel (16)	Great Western Forum; 12,426	8–7
16	December 3	Indiana	W 104-96	Nick Van Exel (26)	Elden Campbell (10)	Threatt & Van Exel (5)	Great Western Forum; 14,223	9–7
17	December 5	@ San Antonio	L 89-117	Cedric Ceballos (16)	Cedric Ceballos (7)	3 players tied (4)	Alamodome; 14,551	9–8
18	December 6	@ Houston	L 99-112	Cedric Ceballos (27)	Cedric Ceballos (17)	Sedale Threatt (9)	The Summit; 16,285	9-9
19	December 8	Toronto	W 120-103	Jones & Threatt (27)	Elden Campbell (12)	Eddie Jones (11)	Great Western Forum; 12,982	10–9
20	December 10	Detroit	W 87-82	Cedric Ceballos (22)	Vlade Divac (13)	Divac & Van Exel (6)	Great Western Forum; 16,176	11–9
21	December 12	@ New York	L 82-97	Cedric Ceballos (26)	Cedric Ceballos (9)	Nick Van Exel (9)	Madison Square Garden; 19,763	11–10
22	December 13	@ Detroit	W 101-98	Nick Van Exel (30)	Campbell & Ceballos (8)	Nick Van Exel (7)	The Palace of Auburn Hills; 14,579	12–10
23	December 15	@ Washington	L 114-122	Cedric Ceballos (33)	Elden Campbell (8)	Nick Van Exel (9)	US Airways Arena; 18,756	12–11
24	December 16	@ Chicago	L 88-108	Cedric Ceballos (27)	Cedric Ceballos (9)	Sedale Threatt (4)	United Center; 23,824	12-12
25	December 19	@ Milwaukee	W 109-105	Nick Van Exel (24)	Elden Campbell (9)	Nick Van Exel (7)	Bradley Center; 14,488	13–12
26	December 20	@ Indiana	L 98-109	Nick Van Exel (20)	Vlade Divac (12)	Nick Van Exel (7)	Market Square Arena; 15,870	13-13
27	December 22	Sacramento	W 116-83	Cedric Ceballos (27)	Elden Campbell (12)	Threatt & Van Exel (9)	Great Western Forum; 16,189	14–13
28	December 23	@ Portland	W 102-99	Cedric Ceballos (24)	Cedric Ceballos (11)	Peeler & Threatt (5)	Rose Garden; 21,401	15–13
29	December 26	Boston	W 102-91	Eddie Jones (19)	Vlade Divac (11)	Nick Van Exel (9)	Great Western Forum; 14,324	16–13
30	December 28	San Antonio	L 99-107	Elden Campbell (25)	Elden Campbell (9)	Eddie Jones (9)	Great Western Forum; 17,505	16–14
31	December 30	@ Utah	L 82-99	Cedric Ceballos (18)	Derek Strong (11)	Eddie Jones (7)	Delta Center; 19,911	16–15

January: 9–3 (home: 5–3; road: 4–0)

Game	Date	Team	Score	High points	High rebounds	High assists	Location Attendance	Record
32	January 2	Philadelphia	L 89-90	Nick Van Exel (27)	Vlade Divac (14)	Nick Van Exel (9)	Great Western Forum; 11,874	16-16
33	January 5	Utah	W 116-100	Cedric Ceballos (28)	Divac & Jones (7)	Jones & Van Exel (8)	Great Western Forum; 16,369	17–16
34	January 7	Denver	L 93-96	Vlade Divac (21)	Campbell & Divac (9)	Nick Van Exel (10)	Great Western Forum; 13,845	17-17
35	January 9	Minnesota	W 106-104	Cedric Ceballos (29)	Corie Blount (9)	Nick Van Exel (9)	Great Western Forum; 10,755	18–17
36	January 12	Houston	W 101-100	Vlade Divac (25)	Vlade Divac (11)	Nick Van Exel (11)	Great Western Forum; 17,505	19–17
37	January 15	Miami	W 96-88	Eddie Jones (20)	Vlade Divac (17)	Nick Van Exel (6)	Great Western Forum; 14,109	20–17
38	January 19	@ L.A. Clippers	W 106-100	Cedric Ceballos (25)	George Lynch (7)	3 players tied (4)	Los Angeles Memorial Sports Arena; 14,018	21–17
39	January 20	Cleveland	L 82-93	Nick Van Exel (17)	George Lynch (9)	Nick Van Exel (5)	Great Western Forum; 15,380	21–18
40	January 24	@ Boston	W 124-107	Elden Campbell (26)	Vlade Divac (11)	Divac & Van Exel (5)	Fleet Center; 18,624	22–18
41	January 26	@ Philadelphia	W 100-88	Cedric Ceballos (31)	Elden Campbell (18)	Vlade Divac (7)	CoreStates Spectrum; 16,129	23–18
42	January 27	@ New Jersey	W 100-98	Cedric Ceballos (29)	Elden Campbell (13)	Nick Van Exel (13)	Continental Airlines Arena; 20,049	24–18
43	January 30	Golden State	W 128-118	Cedric Ceballos (33)	Campbell & Divac (9)	Magic Johnson (10)	Great Western Forum; 17,505	25–18

February: 10–2 (home: 6–1; road: 4–1)

Game	Date	Team	Score	High points	High rebounds	High assists	Location Attendance	Record
44	February 2	Chicago	L 84-99	Cedric Ceballos (23)	Elden Campbell (11)	Nick Van Exel (11)	Great Western Forum; 17,505	25–19
45	February 4	Utah	W 110-103	Magic Johnson (21)	Vlade Divac (11)	Nick Van Exel (9)	Great Western Forum; 17,505	26–19
46	February 6	@ Denver	W 99-78	Cedric Ceballos (27)	Vlade Divac (12)	Magic Johnson (12)	McNichols Sports Arena; 17,171	27–19
47	February 7	New Jersey	W 106-96	Elden Campbell (19)	Elden Campbell (10)	Nick Van Exel (9)	Great Western Forum; 16,481	28–19
All-Star Break
48	February 14	Atlanta	W 87-86	Elden Campbell (20)	Magic Johnson (10)	Magic Johnson (13)	Great Western Forum; 16,792	29–19
49	February 16	Dallas	W 119-114	Magic Johnson (30)	Cedric Ceballos (11)	Magic Johnson (11)	Great Western Forum; 17,505	30–19
50	February 20	L.A. Clippers	W 121-104	Vlade Divac (29)	Cedric Ceballos (10)	Nick Van Exel (11)	Great Western Forum; 17,037	31–19
51	February 21	@ L.A. Clippers	W 112-108	Cedric Ceballos (23)	Elden Campbell (10)	Nick Van Exel (7)	Los Angeles Memorial Sports Arena; 16,021	32–19
52	February 23	@ Dallas	W 114-88	Cedric Ceballos (27)	Vlade Divac (18)	Nick Van Exel (10)	Reunion Arena; 17,502	33–19
53	February 24	@ Houston	L 94-96	Cedric Ceballos (26)	Vlade Divac (12)	Nick Van Exel (7)	The Summit; 16,285	33–20
54	February 26	New York	W 114-96	Cedric Ceballos (27)	Elden Campbell (10)	Nick Van Exel (9)	Great Western Forum; 17,505	34–20
55	February 28	@ Vancouver	W 99-80	Cedric Ceballos (23)	Vlade Divac (17)	Elden Campbell (8)	General Motors Place; 19,193	35–20

March: 10–5 (home: 3–4; road: 7–1)

Game	Date	Team	Score	High points	High rebounds	High assists	Location Attendance	Record
56	March 1	Washington	W 100-95	Cedric Ceballos (27)	Elden Campbell (12)	Nick Van Exel (4)	Great Western Forum; 16,943	36–20
57	March 3	Houston	L 107-111	Nick Van Exel (21)	Elden Campbell (11)	Magic Johnson (5)	Great Western Forum; 17,505	36–21
58	March 7	@ Sacramento	W 102-89	Elden Campbell (29)	Elden Campbell (11)	Magic Johnson (7)	ARCO Arena; 17,317	37–21
59	March 8	@ Phoenix	W 119-97	Nick Van Exel (28)	Vlade Divac (14)	Nick Van Exel (13)	American West Arena; 19,023	38–21
60	March 12	Portland	L 99-105	Elden Campbell (26)	Elden Campbell (11)	Johnson & Van Exel (8)	Great Western Forum; 16,971	38–22
61	March 14	@ Golden State	W 106-103	Magic Johnson (21)	Cedric Ceballos (9)	Nick Van Exel (7)	Oakland-Alameda County Coliseum Arena; 15,025	39–22
62	March 15	Milwaukee	W 117-95	Magic Johnson (20)	Vlade Divac (15)	Magic Johnson (8)	Great Western Forum; 17,505	40–22
63	March 17	Orlando	L 97-98	Campbell & Van Exel (22)	Elden Campbell (10)	Johnson & Van Exel (5)	Great Western Forum; 17,505	40–23
64	March 19	Seattle	W 94-71	Eddie Jones (26)	Elden Campbell (10)	Magic Johnson (10)	Great Western Forum; 17,505	41–23
65	March 21	@ Seattle	L 93-104	Nick Van Exel (26)	Vlade Divac (9)	Vlade Divac (4)	KeyArena; 17,072	41–24
66	March 24	Charlotte	L 94-103	Magic Johnson (28)	Campbell & Johnson (8)	Nick Van Exel (7)	Great Western Forum; 17,505	41–25
67	March 26	@ Orlando	W 113-91	Nick Van Exel (22)	Elden Campbell (10)	Magic Johnson (7)	Orlando Arena; 17,248	42–25
68	March 27	@ Miami	W 106-95	Magic Johnson (27)	Vlade Divac (12)	Magic Johnson (9)	Miami Arena; 15,200	43–25
69	March 29	@ Atlanta	W 102-89	Anthony Peeler (25)	Magic Johnson (10)	Magic Johnson (9)	Omni Coliseum; 16,378	44–25
70	March 31	@ Toronto	W 111-106	Vlade Divac (20)	Vlade Divac (19)	Magic Johnson (6)	SkyDome; 36,046	45–25

April: 8–4 (home: 5–0; road: 3–4)

Game	Date	Team	Score	High points	High rebounds	High assists	Location Attendance	Record
71	April 2	@ Charlotte	L 97-102	Cedric Ceballos (35)	Cedric Ceballos (11)	Magic Johnson (10)	Charlotte Coliseum; 24,042	45–26
72	April 3	@ Cleveland	L 89-105	Magic Johnson (26)	Magic Johnson (8)	Nick Van Exel (8)	Gund Arena; 20,562	45–27
73	April 5	Vancouver	W 104-94	Eddie Jones (26)	Vlade Divac (10)	Vlade Divac (13)	Great Western Forum; 17,505	46–27
74	April 7	San Antonio	W 107-97	Divac & Jones (19)	Vlade Divac (11)	Magic Johnson (7)	Great Western Forum; 17,130	47–27
75	April 9	@ Denver	L 91-98	Vlade Divac (19)	Vlade Divac (9)	3 players tied (4)	McNichols Sports Arena; 17,171	47–28
76	April 10	@ Minnesota	W 111-90	Elden Campbell (28)	Magic Johnson (10)	Magic Johnson (11)	Target Center; 19,006	48–28
77	April 12	Golden State	W 94-81	Vlade Divac (26)	Vlade Divac (10)	Magic Johnson (9)	Great Western Forum; 17,505	49–28
78	April 14	Phoenix	W 118-114	Cedric Ceballos (23)	Vlade Divac (13)	Jones & Threatt (7)	Great Western Forum; 17,505	50–28
79	April 16	@ Dallas	W 113-95	Cedric Ceballos (23)	Elden Campbell (9)	Elden Campbell (9)	Reunion Arena; 17,502	51–28
80	April 18	@ San Antonio	L 100-103	Elden Campbell (27)	Vlade Divac (10)	Sedale Threatt (8)	Alamodome; 22,184	51–29
81	April 20	Minnesota	W 106-82	Cedric Ceballos (36)	Derek Strong (10)	Eddie Jones (8)	Great Western Forum; 17,505	52–29
82	April 21	@ Portland	W 92-88	Jones & Peeler (20)	Cedric Ceballos (7)	Magic Johnson (10)	Rose Garden; 21,401	53–29

1995–96 schedule

=== Playoffs ===
1996 playoff game log
Total: 1–3 (home: 1–1; road: 0–2)
First round: 1–3 (home: 1–1; road: 0–2)

Game	Date	Team	Score	High points	High rebounds	High assists	Location Attendance	Series
1	April 25	Houston	L 83–87	Cedric Ceballos (22)	Magic Johnson (13)	Nick Van Exel (8)	Great Western Forum; 17,505	0–1
2	April 27	Houston	W 104–94	Magic Johnson (26)	Vlade Divac (12)	Magic Johnson (5)	Great Western Forum; 17,505	1–1
3	April 30	@ Houston	L 98–104	Elden Campbell (18)	Elden Campbell (10)	Magic Johnson (13)	The Summit; 16,285	1–2
4	May 2	@ Houston	L 94–102	Cedric Ceballos (25)	Cedric Ceballos (12)	Nick Van Exel (11)	The Summit; 16,285	1–3

1996 schedule

== Player statistics ==
Legend
GP	Games played	GS	Games started	MPG	Minutes per game
FG%	Field-goal percentage	3P%	3-point field-goal percentage	FT%	Free-throw percentage
RPG	Rebounds per game	APG	Assists per game	SPG	Steals per game
BPG	Blocks per game	PPG	Points per game

=== Regular season ===
Los Angeles Lakers statistics
Player	GP	GS	MPG	FG%	3P%	FT%	RPG	APG	SPG	BPG	PPG
Corie Blount	57	2	12.5	.473	.000	.568	3.0	.7	.4	.6	3.2
Elden Campbell	82	82	32.9	.503	.000	.713	7.6	2.2	1.1	2.6	13.9
Cedric Ceballos	78	71	33.7	.530	.277	.804	6.9	1.5	1.2	.3	21.2
Vlade Divac	79	79	31.3	.513	.167	.641	8.6	3.3	1.0	1.7	12.9
Magic Johnson	32	9	29.9	.466	.379	.856	5.7	6.9	.8	.4	14.6
Eddie Jones	70	66	31.2	.492	.366	.739	3.3	3.5	1.8	.6	12.8
Frankie King	6	0	3.3	.273	.000	.333	.3	.3	.3	.0	1.2
George Lynch	76	6	13.3	.430	.308	.663	2.8	.7	.6	.1	3.8
Anthony Miller	27	0	4.6	.429	.000	.600	.9	.1	.1	.0	1.3
Anthony Peeler	73	12	22.0	.452	.413	.709	1.9	1.6	.8	.1	9.7
Fred Roberts	33	1	9.6	.495	.286	.786	1.4	.8	.5	.1	3.7
Derek Strong	63	0	11.8	.426	.111	.812	2.8	.5	.3	.2	3.4
Sedale Threatt	82	8	20.6	.458	.355	.761	1.2	3.3	.8	.1	7.3
Nick Van Exel	74	74	34.0	.417	.357	.799	2.4	6.9	.9	.1	14.9

=== Playoffs ===
Los Angeles Lakers statistics
Player	GP	GS	MPG	FG%	3P%	FT%	RPG	APG	SPG	BPG	PPG
Elden Campbell	4	4	32.3	.513	.000	.500	8.0	2.0	.3	2.3	12.0
Cedric Ceballos	4	4	35.5	.484	.313	.917	8.3	1.3	1.0	.3	19.0
Vlade Divac	4	4	28.8	.429	.200	.625	7.5	2.0	.0	1.3	9.0
Magic Johnson	4	0	33.8	.385	.333	.848	8.5	6.5	.0	.0	15.3
Eddie Jones	4	4	38.8	.551	.526	.625	5.3	1.5	2.0	.3	17.3
George Lynch	2	0	7.5	.500	.000		1.5	.5	.0	.0	2.0
Anthony Peeler	3	0	24.0	.333	.429	1.000	2.7	1.0	2.0	.0	9.3
Fred Roberts	1	0	3.0	.000			3.0	.0	.0	.0	.0
Sedale Threatt	4	0	14.3	.222	.182		.8	1.0	.5	.0	2.5
Nick Van Exel	4	4	34.3	.296	.313	.769	4.0	6.8	.5	.0	11.8

- ^{†} Denotes player spent time with another team in the season. Stats reflect time with the Lakers only.

Player statistics citation:

== Salaries ==
Player	Salary
Vlade Divac	$3,333,000
Sedale Threatt	$2,400,000
Cedric Ceballos	$2,245,000
Elden Campbell	$2,200,000
Nick Van Exel	$1,900,000
George Lynch	$1,760,000
Eddie Jones	$1,600,000
Anthony Peeler	$1,330,000
Corie Blount	$1,040,000
Derek Strong	$1,000,000
Magic Johnson	$1,000,000
Anthony Miller	$550,000
Fred Roberts	$225,000
Frankie King	$200,000

Player salaries citation:
