= Keith Owens =

American basketball player (born 1969)

Personal information
- Born: May 31, 1969 (age 57) San Francisco, California, U.S.
- Listed height: 6 ft 8 in (2.03 m)
- Listed weight: 225 lb (102 kg)

Career information
- High school: Birmingham (Los Angeles, California)
- College: UCLA (1987–1991)
- NBA draft: 1991: undrafted
- Playing career: 1991–1994
- Position: Small forward
- Number: 25

Career history
- 1991–1992: Los Angeles Lakers
- 1992–1993: Montpellier
- 1993–1994: Oklahoma City Cavalry
- 1994: Fargo-Moorhead Fever
- 1994: Joventut Badalona
- Stats at NBA.com
- Stats at Basketball Reference

Keith Kensel Owens (born May 31, 1969) is an American former professional basketball player for the Los Angeles Lakers in the National Basketball Association (NBA). The small forward played one season with the Lakers in the 1991–92 season. He played college basketball for four seasons for the UCLA Bruins from 1987 through 1991.

== Early life ==
Owens was born in San Francisco, California. He was 6 feet 5 inches (1.96 m) and played center in high school at Birmingham High in Van Nuys, California.

== College career ==
Owens was more concerned with his education than being able to play basketball. He rejected athletic scholarship offers from Cal Poly Pomona and Hawaii. He attended college at the University of California, Los Angeles (UCLA) instead, where he made the Bruins basketball team in his first year in 1987 as a 6-foot-8-inch (2.03 m) walk-on under coach Walt Hazzard. However, Owens played so infrequently that year that he calculated his points and rebounds by the minute rather than by the game. By his sophomore year under new coach Jim Harrick, Owens earned a scholarship. He became an integral part of the team in his final two seasons. In his senior year, he was co-captain of the team and averaged 6.3 points and 5.3 rebounds a game and blocked 61 shots. Harrick called Owens "the best post defender we have—a real force for us."

== Professional career ==
Owens made the Los Angeles Lakers roster for the 1991–92 season after beginning on their Summer Pro League team. After being waived by the Lakers before the following season in October 1992, he played in France in 1992–93 with Montpellier Paillade Basket in the Ligue Nationale de Basket. Owens returned to the United States and played in the Continental Basketball Association in 1993–94, splitting the season between the Oklahoma City Cavalry and the Fargo-Moorhead Fever, averaging 13.3 points and 6.4 rebounds per game that year. Afterwards, he went to Spain for a stint with Joventut Badalona in the Liga ACB.

== Later years ==
Owens co-hosted the show Bruin Talk on Fox Sports West in 2000, interviewing UCLA athletes and coaches.
