= 1991–92 Los Angeles Lakers season =

NBA professional basketball team season

- Head coach: Mike Dunleavy Sr.
- General manager: Jerry West
- Owner: Jerry Buss
- Arena: Great Western Forum

Results
- Record: 43–39 (.524)
- Place: Division: 6th (Pacific); Conference: 8th (Western)
- Playoff finish: First round (lost to Trail Blazers 1–3)
- Stats at Basketball Reference

Local media
- Television: KCAL-TV; Prime Ticket
- Radio: KLAC

The 1991–92 Los Angeles Lakers season was the 44th season for the Los Angeles Lakers in the National Basketball Association, and their 32nd season in Los Angeles, California. The Lakers were coming from an NBA Finals defeat to the Chicago Bulls in five games in the 1991 NBA Finals.

== Season summary ==
=== Off-season ===
During the off-season, the Lakers acquired Sedale Threatt from the Seattle SuperSonics. In October, the Lakers played in the international McDonald's Open tournament in Paris, France, where Magic Johnson was named the tournament's Most Valuable Player after helping the Lakers win gold.

=== Regular season ===
This was the start of a new era for the Lakers as Johnson retired early into the regular season, after he announced that he was HIV positive. Starting the regular season without Johnson for the first time since the 1978–79 season, and with the addition of Threatt, the Lakers won 10 of their first 13 games, which included a nine-game winning streak in November, and later on held a 28–18 record at the All-Star break. However, the team struggled playing below .500 in winning percentage for the remainder of the season, posting a seven-game losing streak in February while posting a 3–9 record during that month. The Lakers ultimately finished in sixth place in the Pacific Division with a 43–39 record, which earned them the eighth seed in the Western Conference; it was their worst record since the 1975–76 season, as the team qualified for the NBA playoffs for the 16th consecutive year.

James Worthy averaged 19.9 points, 5.6 rebounds, 4.7 assists and 1.4 steals per game, but only played 54 games due to a season-ending knee injury, while Sam Perkins averaged 16.5 points and 8.8 rebounds per game, and Threatt provided the team with 15.1 points, 7.2 assists and 2.0 steals. In addition, Byron Scott contributed 14.9 points and 1.3 steals per game, while A.C. Green provided with 13.6 points and 9.3 rebounds per game, and Vlade Divac averaged 11.3 points, 6.9 rebounds and 1.5 steals per game, but only played just 36 games due to a back injury. Meanwhile, sixth man Terry Teagle contributed 10.7 points per game off the bench, second-year forward Elden Campbell averaged 7.1 points, 5.2 rebounds and 2.0 blocks per game, and second-year guard Tony Smith provided with 4.4 points per game.

During the NBA All-Star weekend at the Orlando Arena in Orlando, Florida, and despite his HIV infection, Johnson would briefly return to the NBA, as he and Worthy were both selected for the 1992 NBA All-Star Game, as members of the Western Conference All-Star team, despite controversy. Johnson scored 25 points along with 5 rebounds, 9 assists and 2 steals, and made all three of his three-point field-goal attempts, and was named the NBA All-Star Game Most Valuable Player, as the Western Conference defeated the Eastern Conference, 153–113. It was also the final All-Star appearance for both Johnson and Worthy. Head coach Mike Dunleavy finished tied in seventh place in Coach of the Year voting.

The Lakers finished seventh in the NBA in home-game attendance, with an attendance of 699,240 at the Great Western Forum during the regular season.

=== NBA playoffs ===
In the Western Conference First Round of the 1992 NBA playoffs, and for the second consecutive year, the Lakers faced off against the top–seeded, and Pacific Division champion Portland Trail Blazers, a team that featured All-Star guard Clyde Drexler, All-Star guard Terry Porter, and Jerome Kersey. However, without Worthy and Perkins due to season-ending injuries, the Lakers lost the first two games to the Trail Blazers on the road at the Memorial Coliseum, but managed to win Game 3 at home in overtime, 121–119 at the Great Western Forum. Game 4 of the series was played at the Thomas & Mack Center in Paradise, Nevada, home of the NCAA's UNLV Runnin' Rebels basketball team, due to the 1992 Los Angeles riots; the Lakers lost to the Trail Blazers, 102–76, thus losing the series in four games.

The Trail Blazers would lose in six games to the defending NBA champion Chicago Bulls in the 1992 NBA Finals.

=== Aftermath ===
Following the season, Dunleavy resigned and took a coaching job with the Milwaukee Bucks, and Teagle was released to free agency.

== Draft picks ==
Round	Pick	Player	Position	Nationality	College
2	52	Anthony Jones	Forward	United States	Oral Roberts

== Roster ==
1991–92 Los Angeles Lakers roster
Players

Pos.	No.	Player	Height	Weight	DOB	From
SF	6	Chucky Brown	6 ft 7 in (2.01 m)	214 lb (97 kg)	1968–02–29	NC State
C	41	Elden Campbell	6 ft 11 in (2.11 m)	215 lb (98 kg)	1968–07–23	Clemson
C	12	Vlade Divac	7 ft 1 in (2.16 m)	243 lb (110 kg)	1968–02–03	SFR Yugoslavia
PF	45	A.C. Green	6 ft 9 in (2.06 m)	220 lb (100 kg)	1963–10–04	Oregon State
C	54	Jack Haley	6 ft 10 in (2.08 m)	240 lb (109 kg)	1964–01–27	UCLA
SF	25	Keith Owens	6 ft 7 in (2.01 m)	225 lb (102 kg)	1969–05–31	UCLA
PF	14	Sam Perkins (injured)	6 ft 9 in (2.06 m)	235 lb (107 kg)	1961–06–14	North Carolina
PF	43	Cliff Robinson	6 ft 9 in (2.06 m)	220 lb (100 kg)	1960–03–13	USC
SG	4	Byron Scott	6 ft 4 in (1.93 m)	195 lb (88 kg)	1961–03–28	Arizona State
SG	34	Tony Smith	6 ft 3 in (1.91 m)	185 lb (84 kg)	1968–06–14	Marquette
PG	2	Rory Sparrow	6 ft 2 in (1.88 m)	175 lb (79 kg)	1958–06–12	Villanova
SG	20	Terry Teagle	6 ft 5 in (1.96 m)	195 lb (88 kg)	1960–04–10	Baylor
PG	3	Sedale Threatt	6 ft 2 in (1.88 m)	175 lb (79 kg)	1961–09–10	West Virginia Tech
SF	42	James Worthy (injured)	6 ft 9 in (2.06 m)	225 lb (102 kg)	1961–02–27	North Carolina

Coaches
Head coach
- Mike Dunleavy Sr.
Assistant(s)
- Bill Bertka
- Jim Eyen
- Randy Pfund

Legend
- (DP) Unsigned draft pick
- (FA) Free agent
- (S) Suspended
- Injured

Roster
Updated: 1992–04–08

== Regular season ==
=== Season standings ===
Pacific Division	W	L	PCT	GB	Home	Road	Div
y-Portland Trail Blazers	57	25	.695	—	33–8	24–17	21–9
x-Golden State Warriors	55	27	.671	2	31–10	24–17	19–11
x-Phoenix Suns	53	29	.646	4	36–5	17–24	17–13
x-Seattle SuperSonics	47	35	.573	10	28–13	19–22	16–14
x-Los Angeles Clippers	45	37	.549	12	29–12	16–25	13–17
x-Los Angeles Lakers	43	39	.524	14	24–17	19–22	13–17
Sacramento Kings	29	53	.354	28	21–20	8–33	6–24

y - clinched division title
x - clinched playoff spot

#	Western Conference				
#	Team	W	L	PCT	GB
1	c-Portland Trail Blazers	57	25	.695	–
2	y-Utah Jazz	55	27	.671	2
3	x-Golden State Warriors	55	27	.671	2
4	x-Phoenix Suns	53	29	.646	4
5	x-San Antonio Spurs	47	35	.573	10
6	x-Seattle SuperSonics	47	35	.573	10
7	x-Los Angeles Clippers	45	37	.549	12
8	x-Los Angeles Lakers	43	39	.524	14
9	Houston Rockets	42	40	.512	15
10	Sacramento Kings	29	53	.354	28
11	Denver Nuggets	24	58	.293	33
12	Dallas Mavericks	22	60	.268	35
13	Minnesota Timberwolves	15	67	.183	42

z - clinched division title
y - clinched division title
x - clinched playoff spot

== Season summary ==
The Lakers were the first team in NBA history to start the season with three straight overtime games, with their season opener being a double-overtime loss to the Houston Rockets. They went 1-2 during that time. After a third loss, to the Phoenix Suns, they went on a nine-game winning streak to finish November with an 11–4 record, which would be their longest winning streak of the season. They struggled in February, going 3–9, with a seven-game losing streak. They would finish the season with a 43–39 record, placing sixth in the Pacific Division and clinching the eighth and final seed for the playoffs.

== Game log ==
=== Regular season ===
1991–92 game log
Total: 43–39 (home: 24–17; road: 19–22)
November: 11–4 (home: 6–1; road: 5–3)

Game	Date	Team	Score	High points	High rebounds	High assists	Location Attendance	Record
1	November 1	@ Houston	L 121-126 (2OT)	James Worthy (37)	A.C. Green (16)	James Worthy (7)	The Summit; 16,611	0–1
2	November 2	@ Dallas	W 114-113 (OT)	James Worthy (30)	Sedale Threatt (10)	James Worthy (14)	Reunion Arena; 17,502	1-1
3	November 5	L.A. Clippers	L 109-114 (OT)	Sedale Threatt (25)	Elden Campbell (12)	Sedale Threatt (8)	Great Western Forum; 16,618	1–2
4	November 8	@ Phoenix	L 85-113	Terry Teagle (19)	Elden Campbell (14)	James Worthy (5)	Arizona Veterans Memorial Coliseum; 14,496	1–3
5	November 10	Minnesota	W 96-86	Sedale Threatt (27)	James Worthy (14)	Sedale Threatt (9)	Great Western Forum; 16,833	2–3
6	November 14	@ Golden State	W 115-112	Threatt & Worthy (21)	Sam Perkins (10)	Sedale Threatt (6)	Oakland-Alameda County Coliseum Arena; 15,025	3-3
7	November 15	Houston	W 86-74	James Worthy (22)	Sam Perkins (11)	Sedale Threatt (10)	Great Western Forum; 16,956	4–3
8	November 17	Atlanta	W 111-89	A.C. Green (26)	Vlade Divac (13)	Smith & Threatt (8)	Great Western Forum; 16,750	5–3
9	November 19	Phoenix	W 103-95	James Worthy (22)	Sedale Threatt (8)	Sedale Threatt (7)	Great Western Forum; 16,558	6–3
10	November 22	San Antonio	W 98-96	Scott & Threatt (18)	Vlade Divac (11)	Sedale Threatt (8)	Great Western Forum; 17,505	7–3
11	November 24	Milwaukee	W 102-97	A.C. Green (25)	A.C. Green (7)	Sedale Threatt (10)	Great Western Forum; 16,820	8–3
12	November 26	@ Orlando	W 98-87	James Worthy (25)	Elden Campbell (11)	Sedale Threatt (8)	Orlando Arena; 15,151	9–3
13	November 27	@ Miami	W 89-87	Byron Scott (23)	Green & Perkins (8)	James Worthy (5)	Miami Arena; 15,008	10–3
14	November 29	@ Boston	L 91-114	James Worthy (27)	Green & Perkins (12)	Sedale Threatt (6)	Boston Garden; 14,890	10–4
15	November 30	@ Philadelphia	W 93-91	Sam Perkins (17)	Jack Haley (10)	Sedale Threatt (10)	The Spectrum; 18,168	11–4

December: 6–8 (home: 2–4; road: 4–4)

Game	Date	Team	Score	High points	High rebounds	High assists	Location Attendance	Record
16	December 3	@ Milwaukee	L 94-126	A.C. Green (24)	A.C. Green (6)	Green & Worthy (3)	Bradley Center; 17,739	11–5
17	December 4	@ Charlotte	L 106-124	James Worthy (28)	A.C. Green (9)	Sedale Threatt (10)	Charlotte Coliseum; 23,698	11–6
18	December 6	@ New Jersey	W 98-89	Perkins & Worthy (22)	Sam Perkins (14)	Rory Sparrow (4)	Brendan Byrne Arena; 16,384	12–6
19	December 8	Dallas	W 103-88	Green & Scott (16)	Sam Perkins (11)	Sedale Threatt (9)	Great Western Forum; 15,988	13–6
20	December 10	@ Sacramento	W 92-90	Byron Scott (26)	A.C. Green (14)	Sedale Threatt (13)	ARCO Arena; 17,014	14–6
21	December 11	Utah	L 95-101	James Worthy (33)	Sam Perkins (7)	Sedale Threatt (12)	Great Western Forum; 16,932	14–7
22	December 15	Sacramento	W 110-94	Sam Perkins (23)	Sam Perkins (13)	James Worthy (8)	Great Western Forum; 16,131	15–7
23	December 17	@ Chicago	W 102-89	James Worthy (25)	Sam Perkins (10)	Sedale Threatt (9)	Chicago Stadium; 18,676	16–7
24	December 19	@ Minnesota	L 85-93	Perkins & Worthy (22)	A.C. Green (11)	Sedale Threatt (6)	Target Center; 18,402	16–8
25	December 20	@ Detroit	L 93-112	Byron Scott (20)	Sam Perkins (10)	Rory Sparrow (9)	The Palace of Auburn Hills; 21,454	16–9
26	December 22	Phoenix	L 88-100	Sam Perkins (28)	A.C. Green (13)	Threatt & Worthy (8)	Great Western Forum; 17,505	16–10
27	December 25	@ L.A. Clippers	W 85-75	A.C. Green (20)	Green & Scott (11)	Sedale Threatt (6)	Los Angeles Memorial Sports Arena; 15,800	17–10
28	December 28	Portland	L 88-98	James Worthy (21)	A.C. Green (14)	Sedale Threatt (6)	Great Western Forum; 17,505	17–11
29	December 30	Golden State	L 99-114	Sam Perkins (23)	Sam Perkins (7)	Threatt & Worthy (7)	Great Western Forum; 17,505	17–12

January: 10–4 (home: 7–1; road: 3–3)

Game	Date	Team	Score	High points	High rebounds	High assists	Location Attendance	Record
30	January 3	Indiana	L 87-114	Sam Perkins (15)	Sam Perkins (9)	James Worthy (8)	Great Western Forum; 17,280	17–13
31	January 5	Miami	W 123-111	James Worthy (33)	A.C. Green (11)	Sedale Threatt (10)	Great Western Forum; 16,530	18–13
32	January 7	@ Dallas	W 104-80	Terry Teagle (19)	Sam Perkins (13)	Rory Sparrow (6)	Reunion Arena; 17,083	19–13
33	January 8	@ San Antonio	L 87-103	Sedale Threatt (17)	A.C. Green (11)	Scott & Worthy (3)	HemisFair Arena; 16,057	19–14
34	January 10	Denver	W 102-88	James Worthy (26)	A.C. Green (12)	Sedale Threatt (11)	Great Western Forum; 17,000	20–14
35	January 12	Orlando	W 112-99	Byron Scott (31)	Sam Perkins (15)	Sedale Threatt (11)	Great Western Forum; 16,119	21–14
36	January 15	Charlotte	W 95-93	James Worthy (22)	A.C. Green (15)	Sedale Threatt (12)	Great Western Forum; 16,736	22–14
37	January 18	@ Seattle	L 108-122	James Worthy (27)	Sam Perkins (9)	Scott & Threatt (4)	Seattle Center Coliseum; 14,533	22–15
38	January 20	Seattle	W 116-110	Sam Perkins (25)	A.C. Green (16)	Rory Sparrow (7)	Great Western Forum; 17,236	23–15
39	January 21	@ Portland	L 92-131	Sam Perkins (18)	A.C. Green (10)	Sedale Threatt (8)	Memorial Coliseum; 12,888	23–16
40	January 23	@ Sacramento	W 108-105	Sedale Threatt (29)	A.C. Green (14)	Sedale Threatt (5)	ARCO Arena; 17,014	24–16
41	January 24	Sacramento	W 95-92	Scott & Teagle (22)	Sam Perkins (14)	Sedale Threatt (8)	Great Western Forum; 16,949	25–16
42	January 29	Golden State	W 112-99	James Worthy (21)	A.C. Green (12)	Sedale Threatt (5)	Great Western Forum; 17,041	26–16
43	January 30	@ Denver	W 106-96	Byron Scott (28)	A.C. Green (9)	Sedale Threatt (5)	McNichols Sports Arena; 14,707	27–16

February: 3–10 (home: 2–5; road: 1–5)

Game	Date	Team	Score	High points	High rebounds	High assists	Location Attendance	Record
44	February 2	Chicago	L 97-103	Green & Perkins (25)	Sam Perkins (11)	Sedale Threatt (8)	Great Western Forum; 17,505	27–17
45	February 3	@ Phoenix	L 104-113	Sedale Threatt (27)	Elden Campbell (10)	Sedale Threatt (5)	Arizona Veterans Memorial Coliseum; 14,496	27–18
46	February 5	L.A. Clippers	W 100-95	Sam Perkins (25)	A.C. Green (9)	Sedale Threatt (11)	Great Western Forum; 17,049	28–18
All-Star Break
47	February 11	@ Minnesota	W 116-108	Sam Perkins (27)	Sam Perkins (17)	Sedale Threatt (12)	Target Center; 19,006	29–18
48	February 13	@ Utah	L 91-97	James Worthy (24)	A.C. Green (11)	Threatt & Worthy (4)	Delta Center; 19,911	29–19
49	February 14	Washington	L 92-108	Sam Perkins (17)	A.C. Green (13)	James Worthy (6)	Great Western Forum; 16,852	29–20
50	February 16	Boston	L 107-114	James Worthy (24)	Sam Perkins (13)	James Worthy (8)	Great Western Forum; 17,505	29–21
51	February 17	@ Golden State	L 100-116	James Worthy (23)	A.C. Green (13)	Sedale Threatt (7)	Oakland-Alameda County Coliseum Arena; 15,025	29–22
52	February 19	@ L.A. Clippers	L 94-125	Sedale Threatt (16)	Chucky Brown (7)	Sedale Threatt (4)	Los Angeles Memorial Sports Arena; 15,800	29–23
53	February 20	@ Seattle	L 103-105	Sedale Threatt (23)	A.C. Green (15)	Sedale Threatt (6)	Seattle Center Coliseum; 30,847	29–24
54	February 22	Golden State	L 124-126	Sam Perkins (26)	Sam Perkins (12)	Sedale Threatt (10)	Great Western Forum; 17,505	29–25
55	February 26	New York	W 81-68	James Worthy (27)	Green & Perkins (9)	Perkins & Scott (6)	Great Western Forum; 17,505	30–25
56	February 28	Cleveland	L 90-101	Perkins & Scott (20)	Sam Perkins (11)	Sedale Threatt (8)	Great Western Forum; 17,505	30–26

March: 9–6 (home: 4–3; road: 5–3)

Game	Date	Team	Score	High points	High rebounds	High assists	Location Attendance	Record
57	March 1	Houston	L 97-105	Sam Perkins (21)	A.C. Green (7)	Byron Scott (8)	Great Western Forum; 16,908	30–27
58	March 3	@ Portland	L 101-105	Elden Campbell (25)	A.C. Green (10)	Sedale Threatt (8)	Memorial Coliseum; 12,888	30–28
59	March 4	New Jersey	W 101-92	Byron Scott (25)	Sam Perkins (12)	Sam Perkins (6)	Great Western Forum; 17,215	31–28
60	March 8	Detroit	L 93-98	A.C. Green (19)	Green & Perkins (12)	Sedale Threatt (9)	Great Western Forum; 17,505	31–29
61	March 10	@ New York	W 106-104	Sedale Threatt (42)	Sam Perkins (11)	Sedale Threatt (6)	Madison Square Garden; 19,763	32–29
62	March 11	@ Atlanta	W 109-98	Byron Scott (29)	A.C. Green (11)	Sedale Threatt (10)	Omni Coliseum; 15,539	33–29
63	March 13	@ Cleveland	L 107-109 (OT)	Byron Scott (28)	Elden Campbell (9)	Sedale Threatt (14)	Richfield Coliseum; 20,273	33–30
64	March 14	@ Washington	W 92-89	A.C. Green (19)	Sam Perkins (13)	Sedale Threatt (3)	Capital Centre; 18,756	34–30
65	March 16	@ Indiana	L 85-98	Vlade Divac (23)	A.C. Green (13)	Sedale Threatt (10)	Market Square Arena; 14,490	34–31
66	March 18	Portland	L 93-98	Sam Perkins (22)	A.C. Green (11)	Sedale Threatt (10)	Great Western Forum; 17,505	34–32
67	March 20	Minnesota	W 131-121	Terry Teagle (26)	A.C. Green (9)	Byron Scott (11)	Great Western Forum; 16,291	35–32
68	March 26	Dallas	W 115-92	Terry Teagle (28)	Vlade Divac (11)	Sedale Threatt (6)	Great Western Forum; 17,324	36–32
69	March 27	@ Utah	W 103-92	Terry Teagle (23)	Divac & Green (10)	Green & Threatt (4)	Delta Center; 19,911	37–32
70	March 29	Philadelphia	W 117-88	Vlade Divac (32)	A.C. Green (12)	Sedale Threatt (9)	Great Western Forum; 17,505	38–32
71	March 31	@ Houston	W 107-101	Campbell & Green (22)	A.C. Green (16)	Sedale Threatt (5)	The Summit; 15,068	39–32

April: 4–7 (home: 3–3; road: 1–4)

Game	Date	Team	Score	High points	High rebounds	High assists	Location Attendance	Record
72	April 1	@ San Antonio	L 86-104	Terry Teagle (20)	Elden Campbell (11)	Sedale Threatt (5)	HemisFair Arena; 16,057	39–33
73	April 3	Seattle	L 91-96	Sedale Threatt (28)	Vlade Divac (12)	Vlade Divac (5)	Great Western Forum; 17,070	39–34
74	April 5	Phoenix	W 109-104	Vlade Divac (30)	Vlade Divac (13)	Sedale Threatt (12)	Great Western Forum; 17,228	40–34
75	April 7	@ Seattle	L 88-117	Sedale Threatt (18)	Elden Campbell (14)	Sedale Threatt (5)	Seattle Center Coliseum; 12,335	40–35
76	April 9	San Antonio	L 94-102	Terry Teagle (18)	A.C. Green (11)	Tony Smith (7)	Great Western Forum; 16,948	40–36
77	April 11	Utah	L 90-93	Sedale Threatt (24)	A.C. Green (10)	Scott & Threatt (7)	Great Western Forum; 17,176	40–37
78	April 13	Denver	W 100-93	Terry Teagle (27)	A.C. Green (10)	Sedale Threatt (13)	Great Western Forum; 17,137	41–37
79	April 15	@ Denver	L 107-110	Vlade Divac (23)	Sedale Threatt (8)	Sedale Threatt (6)	McNichols Sports Arena; 14,019	41–38
80	April 16	@ Sacramento	L 94-102	Terry Teagle (27)	A.C. Green (17)	Sedale Threatt (10)	ARCO Arena; 17,014	41–39
81	April 18	@ Portland	W 109-101	Vlade Divac (25)	A.C. Green (13)	Sedale Threatt (12)	Memorial Coliseum; 12,888	42–39
82	April 19	L.A. Clippers	W 109-108 (OT)	Byron Scott (27)	A.C. Green (12)	Sedale Threatt (6)	Great Western Forum; 17,505	43–39

1991–92 schedule

=== Playoffs ===
1992 playoff game log
Total: 1–3 (home: 1–1; road: 0–2)
First Round: 1–3 (home: 1–1; road: 0–2)

Game	Date	Team	Score	High points	High rebounds	High assists	Location Attendance	Series
1	April 23	@ Portland	L 102–115	Scott & Teagle (22)	A.C. Green (10)	Byron Scott (5)	Memorial Coliseum; 12,888	0–1
2	April 25	@ Portland	L 79–101	Byron Scott (16)	Elden Campbell (12)	Divac & Sparrow (4)	Memorial Coliseum; 12,888	0–2
3	April 29	Portland	W 121–119 (OT)	Terry Teagle (26)	A.C. Green (10)	Sedale Threatt (6)	Great Western Forum; 16,690	1–2
4	May 3	Portland	L 76–102	Sedale Threatt (17)	A.C. Green (14)	3 players tied (4)	Thomas & Mack Center; 15,478	1–3

1992 schedule

== Player statistics ==
Legend
GP	Games played	GS	Games started	MPG	Minutes per game
FG%	Field-goal percentage	3P%	3-point field-goal percentage	FT%	Free-throw percentage
RPG	Rebounds per game	APG	Assists per game	SPG	Steals per game
BPG	Blocks per game	PPG	Points per game

=== Regular season ===
Los Angeles Lakers statistics
Player	GP	GS	MPG	FG%	3P%	FT%	RPG	APG	SPG	BPG	PPG
Chucky Brown^{†}	36	2	10.6	.466	.000	.610	2.1	.6	.3	.2	3.8
Demetrius Calip	7	0	8.3	.222	.200	.667	.7	1.7	.1	.0	1.6
Elden Campbell	81	47	23.2	.448	.000	.619	5.2	.7	.7	2.0	7.1
Vlade Divac	36	18	27.2	.495	.263	.768	6.9	1.7	1.5	1.0	11.3
A.C. Green	82	53	35.4	.476	.214	.744	9.3	1.4	1.1	.4	13.6
Jack Haley	49	9	8.0	.369		.483	1.9	.1	.1	.2	1.6
Keith Owens	20	0	4.0	.281		.800	.8	.2	.3	.2	1.3
Sam Perkins	63	63	37.0	.450	.217	.817	8.8	2.2	1.0	1.0	16.5
Cliff Robinson	9	0	8.7	.407	.000	.875	2.1	1.0	.6	.0	3.2
Byron Scott	82	82	32.7	.458	.344	.838	3.8	2.8	1.3	.3	14.9
Tony Smith	63	0	13.0	.399	.000	.653	1.2	1.7	.6	.1	4.4
Rory Sparrow^{†}	42	0	11.2	.399	.154	.615	.6	1.9	.3	.1	3.0
Terry Teagle	82	0	19.5	.452	.250	.766	2.2	1.4	.8	.1	10.7
Sedale Threatt	82	82	37.4	.489	.323	.831	3.1	7.2	2.0	.2	15.1
James Worthy	54	54	39.0	.447	.209	.814	5.6	4.7	1.4	.4	19.9

=== Playoffs ===
Los Angeles Lakers statistics
Player	GP	GS	MPG	FG%	3P%	FT%	RPG	APG	SPG	BPG	PPG
Chucky Brown	3	0	14.7	.421	.000	.500	3.7	.7	.0	.7	6.3
Elden Campbell	4	2	29.3	.378		.667	6.3	1.5	.8	1.5	10.0
Vlade Divac	4	4	35.8	.349	.000	.900	5.5	3.8	1.3	.8	9.8
A.C. Green	4	4	38.3	.410		.826	9.0	1.8	1.8	.0	12.8
Jack Haley	2	0	6.0	.250			.5	.5	.0	.0	1.0
Cliff Robinson	3	0	8.0	.300		.625	2.0	.3	1.0	.3	3.7
Byron Scott	4	4	37.0	.500	.583	.889	2.5	3.5	1.5	.3	18.8
Tony Smith	4	0	10.0	.300	.000	.500	.5	1.3	1.0	.0	1.8
Rory Sparrow	3	0	5.3	.250		.750	.3	1.3	.3	.0	1.7
Terry Teagle	4	2	31.5	.491		.800	3.3	2.0	1.3	.5	17.5
Sedale Threatt	4	4	40.5	.522	.667	.750	2.0	4.3	.5	.0	14.8

- ^{†} Denotes player spent time with another team in the season. Stats reflect time with the Lakers only.

Player statistics citation:

== Magic’s retirement ==
Starting point guard Magic Johnson missed the first three games with an unspecified "stomach ailment". On November 7, 1991, Johnson announced that he had tested positive for HIV and would immediately retire. Johnson discovered his condition after attempting to purchase life insurance, and failing the HIV test conducted by Lakers team doctor. During the press conference, he stated that his wife Cookie and unborn child were HIV negative, and that he would become an advocate for HIV education and prevention. The NBA world was shocked; U. S. president George H. W. Bush said: "For me, Magic is a hero, a hero for anyone who loves sports." Johnson was still listed on the roster, as an injured reserve, and continued to be paid.

Johnson was voted in on the West team for the 1992 NBA All-Star Game in Orlando. Columnists and other people speculated on whether he would play. Because HIV is spread through blood, some players voiced concerns about being infected if Johnson were to get a bleeding wound and touch them. Utah Jazz forward Karl Malone was the most vocal player to express concern. Nevertheless, Johnson played in the All-Star Game, leading the West to a 153–113 win and being named the All-Star Most Valuable Player (MVP). The game ended with 14.5 seconds remaining; when Johnson drained a last-minute three-pointer, other players ran on the court to congratulate Johnson and exchange high-fives. It would be Johnson's last game until he made a brief return at the end of the 1995–96 season.

== Magic and the Dream Team ==
Despite being HIV positive, Johnson was chosen for the U.S. team for the 1992 Summer Olympics in Barcelona, Spain. The squad was quickly dubbed the Dream Team because of its abundance of NBA stars such as Jordan, Karl Malone and Bird, but Johnson was the main attraction. At the Olympic Opening Ceremony, German tennis player Steffi Graf ordered colleague Barbara Rittner to photograph her with Johnson, and in the match against Spain, Spanish captain Juan Antonio San Epifanio and his squad demonstratively hugged him, showing that his HIV infection did not matter to them. During the tournament, Johnson struggled with knee problems and played for only a fraction of the games. The point guard position was mostly run by Utah Jazz all-time assist leader John Stockton, but Johnson's presence alone was enough to provoke standing ovations from the crowd. He used the spotlight to attempt to inspire HIV positive people in several interviews.

== Awards and records ==
- The Lakers with Magic Johnson on the team would win the 1991 McDonald's Open by winning games against France's Limoges CSP and Spain's Montigalà Joventut.

=== All-Star ===
- Magic Johnson was given the NBA All-Star Game Most Valuable Player Award after his return from retirement at the 1992 NBA All-Star Game.

=== Season ===
- Magic Johnson was given the J. Walter Kennedy Citizenship Award.
