= 1995–96 Seattle SuperSonics season =

NBA basketball team season

- Conference champions
- Division champions
- Head coach: George Karl
- General manager: Wally Walker
- Arena: KeyArena at Seattle Center

Results
- Record: 64–18 (.780)
- Place: Division: 1st (Pacific); Conference: 1st (Western)
- Playoff finish: NBA Finals (lost to Bulls 2–4)
- Stats at Basketball Reference

Local media
- Television: KSTW; Prime Sports Northwest
- Radio: KJR

The 1995–96 Seattle SuperSonics season was the 28th season for the Seattle SuperSonics in the National Basketball Association.

== Season summary ==
=== Off-season ===
During the off-season, the SuperSonics acquired Hersey Hawkins and David Wingate from the Charlotte Hornets, and re-acquired Frank Brickowski from the Sacramento Kings. The team returned to what had now become the KeyArena at Seattle Center, after spending the previous season in the Tacoma Dome, while the KeyArena was being renovated. This team is widely regarded as one of the greatest teams in NBA history.

For the season, the SuperSonics redesigned their primary logo, replacing the color green with dark green, dark red and brown to their color scheme of golden yellow and white. The team's primary logo featured a dark green oval with the Space Needle, forming the letter "I" in the team name "Sonics" in brown letters with a golden yellow outline and dark red shadows, below the city name "Seattle" in white letters, along with a brown basketball with dark green seams in front of the Space Needle; the logo is surrounded by a dark green outline. The team also redesigned their home and road uniforms, which featured side panels on the right side of their jerseys and shorts; the white home uniforms featured a dark green, golden yellow and dark red trim, and dark green side panels with golden yellow and dark red outlines, while the road uniforms were changed from green to dark green, and featured a dark red and golden yellow trim, and dark red side panels with a golden yellow inline.

The team's new primary logo, and new uniforms would both remain in use until 2001.

=== Regular season ===
With the addition of Hawkins, and after two consecutive NBA playoff appearances losing in the first round, the SuperSonics got off to a 9–6 start to the regular season in November, but posted a seven-game winning streak between December and January, and later on held a 34–12 record at the All-Star break. The team posted a 14-game winning streak between February and March, and then posted a nine-game winning streak between March and April. The SuperSonics won 30 of their final 36 games of the season, winning the Pacific Division title with a franchise-best 64–18 record, surpassing the record from the 1993–94 season, and earning the first seed in the Western Conference. The team also posted a 38–3 record at home, which was the second-best in the league, and qualified for the NBA playoffs for the sixth consecutive year.

Shawn Kemp averaged 19.6 points, 11.4 rebounds and 1.6 blocks per game, while Gary Payton averaged 19.3 points, 7.5 assists and 2.9 steals per game, and was named to the NBA All-Defensive First Team, and was also named the NBA Defensive Player of the Year, becoming the first and only point guard ever to win the award; Kemp and Payton were both named to the All-NBA Second Team. In addition, Detlef Schrempf provided the team with 17.1 points, 5.2 rebounds and 4.4 assists per game, but only played 63 games due to a knee injury, while Hawkins contributed 15.6 points and 1.8 steals per game, and led the SuperSonics with 146 three-point field goals, sixth man Sam Perkins provided with 11.8 points and 4.5 rebounds per game, along with 129 three-point field goals off the bench, and starting center Ervin Johnson contributed 5.5 points, 5.3 rebounds and 1.6 blocks per game. Off the bench, Vincent Askew averaged 8.4 points per game, while Brickowski contributed 5.4 points per game, and defensive guard Nate McMillan provided with 5.0 points, 3.6 assists and 1.7 steals per game.

During the NBA All-Star weekend at the Alamodome in San Antonio, Texas, Kemp and Payton were both selected for the 1996 NBA All-Star Game, as members of the Western Conference All-Star team, while head coach George Karl was selected to coach the Western Conference. Payton also finished in sixth place in Most Valuable Player voting, while Kemp finished in eighth place. This Sonics team is regarded as one of the best defensive teams in the late 1990s; led by Kemp and Payton, the two formed "Sonic Boom", one of the most electrifying tandems in NBA history.

The SuperSonics finished 14th in the NBA in home-game attendance, with an attendance of 697,301 at the KeyArena at Seattle Center during the regular season.

=== NBA playoffs ===
In the Western Conference First Round of the 1996 NBA playoffs, the SuperSonics faced off against the 8th–seeded Sacramento Kings, a team that featured All-Star guard Mitch Richmond, Brian Grant and Olden Polynice. The SuperSonics won Game 1 over the Kings at home, 97–85 at the KeyArena at Seattle Center, but then lost Game 2 at home, 90–81 as the Kings evened the series. The SuperSonics won the next two games on the road, which included a Game 4 win over the Kings at the ARCO Arena II, 101–87 to win the series in four games, and advance to the second round for the first time in three years.

In the Western Conference Semi-finals, the team faced off against the 5th–seeded, and 2-time defending NBA champion Houston Rockets, a team that featured All-Star center Hakeem Olajuwon, All-Star guard Clyde Drexler, and Robert Horry. The SuperSonics won the first two games over the Rockets at the KeyArena at Seattle Center, and then won the next two games on the road, including a Game 4 win over the Rockets at The Summit in overtime, 114–107 to win the series in a four-game sweep, and advance to the Conference Finals.

In the Western Conference Finals, the SuperSonics then faced off against the 3rd–seeded Utah Jazz, who were led by the trio of All-Star forward Karl Malone, All-Star guard John Stockton, and Jeff Hornacek. The SuperSonics took a 2–0 series lead, but then lost Game 3 to the Jazz on the road, 96–76 at the Delta Center, before winning Game 4 on the road, 88–86 to take a 3–1 series lead. However, the Jazz managed to win the next two games to even the series; the SuperSonics won Game 7 over the Jazz at the KeyArena at Seattle Center, 90–86 to win in a hard-fought seven-game series, and advance to the NBA Finals for the first time since 1979.

In the 1996 NBA Finals, the SuperSonics faced off against the top–seeded Chicago Bulls, who were led by the trio of All-Star guard, and Most Valuable Player of the Year, Michael Jordan, All-Star forward Scottie Pippen, and rebound-specialist Dennis Rodman, and also finished with a league-best 72–10 record. The SuperSonics lost the first two games to the Bulls on the road at the United Center, and then lost Game 3 at home, 108–86 at the KeyArena at Seattle Center, as the Bulls took a 3–0 series lead. However, the SuperSonics managed to win their next two home games, but then lost Game 6 to the Bulls at the United Center, 87–75, thus losing the series in six games, as the Bulls won their fourth NBA championship.

=== Aftermath ===
Following the season, Johnson signed as a free agent with the Denver Nuggets, while Askew was traded to the New Jersey Nets, and Brickowski signed with the Boston Celtics.

This Sonics team has been featured in the video game series NBA 2K.

== Draft picks ==
Round	Pick	Player	Position	Nationality	College/team
1	26	Sherell Ford	SF	United States	Illinois–Chicago
2	54	Eurelijus Žukauskas	C	Lithuania	Neptūnas Klaipėda

== Roster ==
1995–96 Seattle SuperSonics roster
Players

Pos.	No.	Player	Height	Weight	DOB	From
F	2	Vincent Askew	6 ft 6 in (1.98 m)	210 lb (95 kg)	1966–02–28	Memphis
F	34	Frank Brickowski	6 ft 9 in (2.06 m)	240 lb (109 kg)	1959–08–14	Penn State
F	1	Sherell Ford	6 ft 7 in (2.01 m)	210 lb (95 kg)	1972–08–26	UIC
G	33	Hersey Hawkins	6 ft 3 in (1.91 m)	190 lb (86 kg)	1966–09–29	Bradley
C	50	Ervin Johnson	6 ft 11 in (2.11 m)	245 lb (111 kg)	1967–12–21	LSU New Orleans
F	40	Shawn Kemp	6 ft 10 in (2.08 m)	230 lb (104 kg)	1969–11–26	Trinity Valley CC
G	10	Nate McMillan	6 ft 5 in (1.96 m)	195 lb (88 kg)	1964–08–03	NC State
G	20	Gary Payton	6 ft 4 in (1.93 m)	180 lb (82 kg)	1968–07–23	Oregon State
C	14	Sam Perkins	6 ft 9 in (2.06 m)	235 lb (107 kg)	1961–06–14	North Carolina
C	55	Steve Scheffler	6 ft 9 in (2.06 m)	250 lb (113 kg)	1967–09–03	Purdue
F	11	Detlef Schrempf	6 ft 10 in (2.08 m)	214 lb (97 kg)	1963–01–21	Washington
G	3	Eric Snow	6 ft 3 in (1.91 m)	190 lb (86 kg)	1973–04–24	Michigan State
G	25	David Wingate	6 ft 5 in (1.96 m)	185 lb (84 kg)	1963–12–15	Georgetown

Coaches
Head coach
- George Karl
Assistant(s)
- Dwane Casey
- Tim Grgurich
- Terry Stotts
- Bob Weiss

Legend
- (DP) Unsigned draft pick
- (FA) Free agent
- (S) Suspended
- Injured

Roster
Updated: October 31, 1995

== Regular season ==
=== Season standings ===
Pacific Division	W	L	PCT	GB	Home	Road	Div
c-Seattle SuperSonics	64	18	.780	–	38–3	26–15	21–3
x-Los Angeles Lakers	53	29	.646	11	30–11	23–18	17–7
x-Portland Trail Blazers	44	38	.537	20	26–15	18–23	11–13
x-Phoenix Suns	41	41	.500	23	25–16	16–25	9–15
x-Sacramento Kings	39	43	.476	25	26–15	13–28	11–13
Golden State Warriors	36	46	.439	28	23–18	13–28	7–17
Los Angeles Clippers	29	53	.354	35	19–22	10–31	7–17

Western Conference
#	Team	W	L	PCT	GB	GP
1	c-Seattle SuperSonics *	64	18	.780	–	82
2	y-San Antonio Spurs *	59	23	.720	5	82
3	x-Utah Jazz	55	27	.671	9	82
4	x-Los Angeles Lakers	53	29	.646	11	82
5	x-Houston Rockets	48	34	.585	16	82
6	x-Portland Trail Blazers	44	38	.537	20	82
7	x-Phoenix Suns	41	41	.500	23	82
8	x-Sacramento Kings	39	43	.476	25	82
9	Golden State Warriors	36	46	.439	28	82
10	Denver Nuggets	35	47	.427	29	82
11	Los Angeles Clippers	29	53	.354	35	82
12	Minnesota Timberwolves	26	56	.317	38	82
13	Dallas Mavericks	26	56	.317	38	82
14	Vancouver Grizzlies	15	67	.183	49	82

=== Game log ===
1995–96 game log
Total: 64–18 (home: 38–3; road: 26–15)
November: 9–6 (home: 5–1; road: 4–5)

Game	Date	Team	Score	High points	High rebounds	High assists	Location Attendance	Record
1	November 3	@ Utah	L 94–112	Detlef Schrempf (24)	Shawn Kemp (8)	Gary Payton (7)	Delta Center; 19,911	0–1
2	November 4	L.A. Lakers	W 103–89	Shawn Kemp (23)	Shawn Kemp (13)	Gary Payton (7)	KeyArena; 17,102	1–1
3	November 7	L.A. Clippers	W 127–108	Gary Payton (21)	Shawn Kemp (9)	Gary Payton (9)	KeyArena; 17,102	2–1
4	November 8	@ Denver	W 122–117	Detlef Schrempf (35)	Detlef Schrempf (8)	Gary Payton (10)	McNichols Sports Arena; 17,171	3–1
5	November 10	@ L.A. Lakers	L 97–100	Schrempf, Kemp (27)	Shawn Kemp (14)	Gary Payton (10)	Great Western Forum; 15,542	3–2
6	November 11	Vancouver	W 117–81	Shawn Kemp (24)	Ervin Johnson (11)	Shawn Kemp (6)	KeyArena; 17,102	4–2
7	November 14	@ Phladelphia	W 115–107	Shawn Kemp (29)	Kemp, Perkins (12)	Gary Payton (11)	CoreStates Spectrum; 10,098	5–2
8	November 15	@ Detroit	L 87–94	Shawn Kemp (23)	Shawn Kemp (21)	Gary Payton (6)	The Palace of Auburn Hills; 14,732	5–3
9	November 17	@ Charlotte	W 98–96	Gary Payton (19)	Shawn Kemp (16)	Gary Payton (5)	Charlotte Coliseum; 24,042	6–3
10	November 18	@ Indiana	L 104–118	Shawn Kemp (27)	Shawn Kemp (12)	Shawn Kemp (9)	Market Square Arena; 16,724	6–4
11	November 21	@ Toronto	L 97–102	Gary Payton (24)	Shawn Kemp (8)	Gary Payton (11)	SkyDome; 21,836	6–5
12	November 22	@ Minnesota	W 106–97	Shawn Kemp (26)	Shawn Kemp (12)	Gary Payton (7)	Target Center; 12,504	7–5
13	November 24	San Antonio	W 112–100	Hersey Hawkins (27)	Shawn Kemp (17)	Gary Payton (9)	KeyArena; 17,072	8–5
14	November 26	Chicago	W 97–92	Gary Payton (26)	Shawn Kemp (14)	Gary Payton (11)	KeyArena; 17,072	9–5
15	November 28	Indiana	L 101–102	Gary Payton (24)	Schrempf, Kemp (8)	Nate McMillan (7)	KeyArena; 17,072	9–6

December: 11–2 (home: 8–0; road: 3–2)

Game	Date	Team	Score	High points	High rebounds	High assists	Location Attendance	Record
16	December 1	Milwaukee	W 110–99	Shawn Kemp (27)	Shawn Kemp (12)	Schrempf, Payton (5)	KeyArena; 17,072	10–6
17	December 5	Toronto	W 119–89	Shawn Kemp (21)	Kemp, Johnson (9)	Gary Payton (9)	KeyArena; 17,072	11–6
18	December 8	@ Sacramento	W 120–103	Hersey Hawkins (34)	Payton, Kemp (7)	Gary Payton (14)	ARCO Arena; 17,317	12–6
19	December 9	Portland	W 106–97	Detlef Schrempf (28)	Shawn Kemp (13)	Gary Payton (12)	KeyArena; 17,072	13–6
20	December 12	@ Dallas	L 101–112 (OT)	Hersey Hawkins (24)	Shawn Kemp (22)	Gary Payton (9)	Reunion Arena; 16,089	13–7
21	December 13	@ San Antonio	W 88–83	Shawn Kemp (30)	Shawn Kemp (16)	Gary Payton (8)	Alamodome; 13,645	14–7
22	December 15	Golden State	W 108–101	Shawn Kemp (32)	Shawn Kemp (16)	Shawn Kemp (7)	KeyArena; 17,072	15–7
23	December 19	@ Vancouver	L 93–94	Hersey Hawkins (22)	Shawn Kemp (8)	Gary Payton (7)	General Motors Place; 16,701	15–8
24	December 21	Vancouver	W 92–68	Gary Payton (22)	Shawn Kemp (12)	Gary Payton (6)	KeyArena; 17,072	16–8
25	December 23	Washington	W 118–100	Gary Payton (27)	Shawn Kemp (15)	Gary Payton (11)	KeyArena; 17,072	17–8
26	December 27	Denver	W 99–83	Hersey Hawkins (24)	Shawn Kemp (16)	Nate McMillan (7)	KeyArena; 17,072	18–8
27	December 29	Boston	W 124–85	Gary Payton (26)	Kemp, Johnson (13)	Gary Payton (9)	KeyArena; 17,072	19–8
28	December 30	@ Phoenix	W 123–112 (OT)	Hersey Hawkins (35)	Hersey Hawkins (10)	Gary Payton (10)	America West Arena; 19,023	20–8

January: 12–3 (home: 6–1; road: 6–2)

Game	Date	Team	Score	High points	High rebounds	High assists	Location Attendance	Record
29	January 2	@ Atlanta	W 111–88	Frank Brickowski (21)	Shawn Kemp (12)	McMillan, Payton (6)	Omni Coliseum; 8,524	21–8
30	January 4	@ Miami	W 84–81	Shawn Kemp (21)	Shawn Kemp (13)	Payton, McMillan (5)	Miami Arena; 14,964	22–8
31	January 5	@ Orlando	L 93–115	Hersey Hawkins (25)	Shawn Kemp (11)	McMillan, Payton (5)	Orlando Arena; 17,248	22–9
32	January 9	@ Milwaukee	W 97–92	Gary Payton (26)	Shawn Kemp (10)	Nate McMillan (7)	Bradley Center; 15,388	23–9
33	January 10	@ Chicago	L 87–113	Shawn Kemp (17)	Shawn Kemp (13)	Nate McMillan (5)	United Center; 23,877	23–10
34	January 12	Miami	W 113–81	Shawn Kemp (27)	Shawn Kemp (13)	Nate McMillan (5)	KeyArena; 17,072	24–10
35	January 15	@ Golden State	W 104–95	Gary Payton (23)	Shawn Kemp (14)	Gary Payton (9)	Oakland Coliseum Arena; 15,025	25–10
36	January 16	Cleveland	W 99–90	Shawn Kemp (31)	Shawn Kemp (16)	Gary Payton (8)	KeyArena; 17,072	26–10
37	January 19	New York	L 97–100 (OT)	Shawn Kemp (25)	Shawn Kemp (14)	Nate McMillan (4)	KeyArena; 17,072	26–11
38	January 21	Dallas	W 108–101	Shawn Kemp (26)	Shawn Kemp (13)	Nate McMillan (6)	KeyArena; 17,072	27–11
39	January 24	Denver	W 86–79	Sam Perkins (18)	Hersey Hawkins (6)	Gary Payton (9)	KeyArena; 17,072	28–11
40	January 26	Utah	W 94–93	Gary Payton (24)	Shawn Kemp (12)	Hawkins, Payton (5)	KeyArena; 17,072	29–11
41	January 27	@ L.A. Clippers	W 96–87	Payton, Hawkins (23)	Shawn Kemp (11)	Gary Payton (8)	Arrowhead Pond of Anaheim; 15,081	30–11
42	January 29	@ Portland	W 92–88	Gary Payton (21)	Shawn Kemp (7)	Gary Payton (7)	Rose Garden Arena; 21,221	31–11
43	January 30	New Jersey	W 97–88	Shawn Kemp (25)	Shawn Kemp (13)	Nate McMillan (6)	KeyArena; 16,003	32–11

February: 11–1 (home: 7–0; road: 4–1)

Game	Date	Team	Score	High points	High rebounds	High assists	Location Attendance	Record
44	February 1	@ Dallas	L 100–103	Shawn Kemp (22)	Shawn Kemp (15)	four players tied (5)	Reunion Arena; 15,295	32–12
45	February 3	@ Houston	W 104–103 (OT)	Gary Payton (32)	Shawn Kemp (18)	Payton, Schrempf (8)	The Summit; 16,285	33–12
46	February 6	Houston	W 99–94	Payton, Kemp (22)	Shawn Kemp (13)	Detlef Schrempf (9)	KeyArena; 17,072	34–12
All-Star Break
47	February 13	@ Phoenix	W 102–98	Gary Payton (23)	Shawn Kemp (14)	Gary Payton (10)	America West Arena; 19,023	35–12
48	February 14	Minnesota	W 130–93	Ervin Johnson (28)	Ervin Johnson (12)	Gary Payton (12)	KeyArena; 16,260	36–12
49	February 16	Phoenix	W 117–99	Schrempf, Hawkins (19)	Detlef Schrempf (8)	Gary Payton (10)	KeyArena; 17,072	37–12
50	February 18	@ Vancouver	W 118–109	Shawn Kemp (25)	Shawn Kemp (12)	Gary Payton (7)	General Motors Place; 19,193	38–12
51	February 19	Atlanta	W 102–94	Shawn Kemp (21)	Kemp, McMillan (7)	Gary Payton (8)	KeyArena; 17,072	39–12
52	February 22	Golden State	W 106–90	Gary Payton (19)	Ervin Johnson (11)	Gary Payton (7)	KeyArena; 17,072	40–12
53	February 24	Sacramento	W 104–91	Shawn Kemp (30)	Shawn Kemp (18)	four players tied (3)	KeyArena; 17,072	41–12
54	February 25	@ L.A. Clippers	W 106–101	Sam Perkins (22)	Shawn Kemp (17)	Gary Payton (9)	Los Angeles Memorial Sports Arena; 8,807	42–12
55	February 28	Detroit	W 94–80	Shawn Kemp (23)	Shawn Kemp (14)	Gary Payton (8)	KeyArena; 17,072	43–12

March: 13–3 (home: 7–1; road: 6–2)

Game	Date	Team	Score	High points	High rebounds	High assists	Location Attendance	Record
56	March 1	@ Boston	W 106–96	Payton, Schrempf (21)	Ervin Johnson (8)	Gary Payton (7)	FleetCenter; 18,624	44–12
57	March 2	@ New Jersey	W 103–92	Detlef Schrempf (26)	Ervin Johnson (13)	Gary Payton (7)	Brendan Byrne Arena; 20,049	45–12
58	March 5	@ Cleveland	W 107–101 (2OT)	Gary Payton (24)	three players tied (8)	Gary Payton (9)	Gund Arena; 17,260	46–12
59	March 6	@ Washington	L 88–99	Gary Payton (26)	Sam Perkins (11)	Gary Payton (3)	USAir Arena; 18,756	46–13
60	March 8	@ Minnesota	W 132–112	Gary Payton (33)	Perkins, Askew (9)	Gary Payton (10)	Target Center; 13,930	47–13
61	March 10	San Antonio	L 105–106	Gary Payton (30)	Gary Payton (11)	Gary Payton (6)	KeyArena; 17,072	47–14
62	March 13	Orlando	W 100–99	Gary Payton (23)	Shawn Kemp (12)	Shawn Kemp (8)	KeyArena; 17,072	48–14
63	March 15	Dallas	W 120–97	Sam Perkins (26)	Shawn Kemp (12)	Eric Snow (13)	KeyArena; 17,072	49–14
64	March 18	L.A. Clippers	W 104–101	Shawn Kemp (27)	Gary Payton (10)	Gary Payton (10)	KeyArena; 16,638	50–14
65	March 19	@ L.A. Lakers	L 71–94	Gary Payton (17)	Shawn Kemp (15)	Detlef Schrempf (6)	Great Western Forum; 17,505	50–15
66	March 21	L.A. Lakers	W 104–93	three players tied (20)	Shawn Kemp (11)	Gary Payton (7)	KeyArena; 17,072	51–15
67	March 23	Philadelphia	W 129–89	Shawn Kemp (20)	Ervin Johnson (11)	Detlef Schrempf (8)	KeyArena; 16,646	52–15
68	March 24	@ Sacramento	W 112–110	Gary Payton (38)	Payton, Kemp (11)	Payton, McMillan (9)	ARCO Arena; 17,317	53–15
69	March 26	@ Golden State	W 114–102	Payton, Schrempf (23)	Detlef Schrempf (7)	Gary Payton (11)	Oakland Coliseum Arena; 15,025	54–15
70	March 27	Charlotte	W 132–95	Shawn Kemp (21)	Kemp, Johnson (11)	Gary Payton (17)	KeyArena; 17,072	55–15
71	March 30	Utah	W 100–98	Sam Perkins (22)	Ervin Johnson (10)	Gary Payton (10)	KeyArena; 17,072	56–15

April: 8–3 (home: 5–0; road: 3–3)

Game	Date	Team	Score	High points	High rebounds	High assists	Location Attendance	Record
72	April 2	@ Utah	W 100–91	Detlef Schrempf (29)	Shawn Kemp (11)	Gary Payton (9)	Delta Center; 19,911	57–15
73	April 3	Houston	W 118–103	Gary Payton (30)	Shawn Kemp (9)	Gary Payton (12)	KeyArena; 17,072	58–15
74	April 5	Phoenix	W 130–121 (2OT)	Shawn Kemp (26)	Schrempf, Kemp (9)	Gary Payton (10)	KeyArena; 17,072	59–15
75	April 6	@ Portland	L 92–95	Askew, Perkins (17)	Shawn Kemp (10)	Gary Payton (11)	Rose Garden Arena; 21,401	59–16
76	April 8	@ New York	W 108–98	Shawn Kemp (25)	Shawn Kemp (13)	Gary Payton (9)	Madison Square Garden; 19,763	60–16
77	April 10	Sacramento	W 108–89	Detlef Schrempf (20)	Ervin Johnson (12)	Payton, McMillan (7)	KeyArena; 17,072	61–16
78	April 13	@ San Antonio	L 81–84	Detlef Schrempf (20)	Shawn Kemp (14)	Hersey Hawkins (5)	Alamodome; 31,710	61–17
79	April 15	@ Houston	W 112–106	Gary Payton (31)	Shawn Kemp (10)	Gary Payton (9)	The Summit; 16,285	62–17
80	April 17	Portland	W 96–90	Hersey Hawkins (20)	Ervin Johnson (13)	Gary Payton (10)	KeyArena; 17,072	63–17
81	April 19	Minnesota	W 94–86	Hersey Hawkins (23)	Shawn Kemp (11)	Schrempf, Kemp (5)	KeyArena; 17,072	64–17
82	April 21	@ Denver	L 88–99	three players tied (13)	Sam Perkins (7)	Hersey Hawkins (3)	McNichols Sports Arena; 15,921	64–18

1995–96 schedule

=== Season Synopsis ===
==== November ====
The SuperSonics started their season on November 3 on the road wherein they faced the Utah Jazz in Salt Lake City. They started the game well after leading the Jazz in the 1st Quarter, but the Jazz fought back and never looked back as they defeated the Sonics, 112–94. The Sonics now went back home to play the two Los Angeles teams, the Los Angeles Lakers and the L.A. Clippers. The SuperSonics won both of their home games, as they were now up 2-1 for the season. On November 26, the SuperSonics hosted the Michael Jordan-led Chicago Bulls. The visiting Bulls hold a double-digit lead at halftime but the Sonics fought back and only allowed 28 2nd half PTS for the Bulls as they won the game, 97–92. The month of November for the Sonics ended in a disappointing way because they were defeated by a point by the visiting Indiana Pacers led by Reggie Miller. Overall, the Sonics posted a record of 9–6 in 15 games played during that month.

== Playoffs ==
1996 playoff game log
First round: 3–1 (home: 1–1; road: 2–0)

Game	Date	Team	Score	High points	High rebounds	High assists	Location Attendance	Series
1	April 26	Sacramento	W 97–85	Gary Payton (29)	Ervin Johnson (10)	Gary Payton (9)	KeyArena; 17,072	1–0
2	April 28	Sacramento	L 81–90	Shawn Kemp (21)	Shawn Kemp (8)	Gary Payton (7)	KeyArena; 17,072	1–1
3	April 30	@ Sacramento	W 96–89	Sam Perkins (17)	Shawn Kemp (9)	Gary Payton (7)	ARCO Arena; 17,317	2–1
4	May 2	@ Sacramento	W 101–87	Gary Payton (29)	Detlef Schrempf (10)	Detlef Schrempf (9)	ARCO Arena; 17,317	3–1

Conference Semi-finals: 4–0 (home: 2–0; road: 2–0)

Game	Date	Team	Score	High points	High rebounds	High assists	Location Attendance	Series
1	May 4	Houston	W 108–75	Gary Payton (28)	Shawn Kemp (12)	Gary Payton (7)	KeyArena; 17,072	1–0
2	May 6	Houston	W 105–101	Detlef Schrempf (21)	Schrempf, Kemp (10)	Schrempf, Payton (5)	KeyArena; 17,072	2–0
3	May 10	@ Houston	W 115–112	Gary Payton (28)	Shawn Kemp (18)	Gary Payton (8)	The Summit; 16,285	3–0
4	May 12	@ Houston	W 114–107 (OT)	Shawn Kemp (32)	Shawn Kemp (15)	Gary Payton (11)	The Summit; 16,611	4–0

Conference Finals: 4–3 (home: 3–1; road: 1–2)

Game	Date	Team	Score	High points	High rebounds	High assists	Location Attendance	Series
1	May 18	Utah	W 102–72	Kemp, Payton (21)	Shawn Kemp (11)	Gary Payton (7)	KeyArena; 17,072	1–0
2	May 20	Utah	W 91–87	Gary Payton (18)	Nate McMillan (5)	Gary Payton (8)	KeyArena; 17,072	2–0
3	May 24	@ Utah	L 76–96	Gary Payton (25)	Hawkins, Payton (6)	Gary Payton (3)	Delta Center; 19,911	2–1
4	May 26	@ Utah	W 88–86	Gary Payton (19)	Shawn Kemp (8)	Gary Payton (6)	Delta Center; 19,911	3–1
5	May 28	Utah	L 95–98 (OT)	Gary Payton (31)	Shawn Kemp (13)	Gary Payton (6)	KeyArena; 17,072	3–2
6	May 30	@ Utah	L 83–118	Shawn Kemp (26)	Shawn Kemp (14)	Gary Payton (7)	Delta Center; 19,911	3–3
7	June 2	Utah	W 90–86	Shawn Kemp (26)	Shawn Kemp (14)	Gary Payton (5)	KeyArena; 17,072	4–3

NBA Finals: 2–4 (home: 2–1; road: 0–3)

Game	Date	Team	Score	High points	High rebounds	High assists	Location Attendance	Series
1	June 5	@ Chicago	L 90–107	Shawn Kemp (32)	Gary Payton (10)	Gary Payton (6)	United Center; 24,544	0–1
2	June 7	@ Chicago	L 88–92	Shawn Kemp (29)	Shawn Kemp (13)	Payton, Schrempf (3)	United Center; 24,544	0–2
3	June 9	Chicago	L 86–108	Detlef Schrempf (20)	Brickowski, Payton (7)	Gary Payton (9)	KeyArena; 17,072	0–3
4	June 12	Chicago	W 107–86	Shawn Kemp (25)	Shawn Kemp (11)	Gary Payton (11)	KeyArena; 17,072	1–3
5	June 14	Chicago	W 89–78	Gary Payton (23)	Shawn Kemp (10)	Gary Payton (6)	KeyArena; 17,072	2–3
6	June 16	@ Chicago	L 75–87	Detlef Schrempf (23)	Shawn Kemp (14)	Gary Payton (7)	United Center; 24,544	2–4

1996 schedule

== Player statistics ==
Legend
GP	Games played	GS	Games started	MPG	Minutes per game
FG%	Field-goal percentage	3P%	3-point field-goal percentage	FT%	Free-throw percentage
RPG	Rebounds per game	APG	Assists per game	SPG	Steals per game
BPG	Blocks per game	PPG	Points per game

=== Season ===
Player	GP	GS	MPG	FG%	3P%	FT%	RPG	APG	SPG	BPG	PPG
Vincent Askew	69	2	25.0	.493	.337	.764	3.2	2.4	.7	.2	8.4
Frank Brickowski	63	8	15.7	.488	.405	.709	2.4	.9	.4	.1	5.4
Sherell Ford	28	1	5.0	.375	.160	.765	.9	.2	.3	.0	3.2
Hersey Hawkins	82	82	34.4	.473	.384	.874	3.6	2.7	1.8	.2	15.6
Ervin Johnson	81	60	18.8	.511	.333	.669	5.3	.6	.5	1.6	5.5
Shawn Kemp	79	76	33.3	.561	.417	.742	11.4	2.2	1.2	1.6	19.6
Nate McMillan	55	14	22.9	.420	.380	.707	3.8	3.6	1.7	.3	5.0
Gary Payton	81	81	39.0	.484	.328	.748	4.2	7.5	2.9	.2	19.3
Sam Perkins	82	20	26.5	.408	.355	.793	4.5	1.5	1.0	.6	11.8
Steve Scheffler	35	2	5.2	.533	.200	.474	.9	.1	.2	.1	1.7
Detlef Schrempf	63	60	34.9	.486	.408	.776	5.2	4.4	.9	.1	17.1
Eric Snow	43	1	9.0	.420	.200	.592	1.0	1.7	.7	.0	2.7
David Wingate	60	3	11.6	.415	.441	.780	.9	1.0	.3	.1	3.7

=== Playoffs ===
Player	GP	GS	MPG	FG%	3P%	FT%	RPG	APG	SPG	BPG	PPG
Vincent Askew	19	0	18.2	.343	.261	.607	2.2	1.4	.7	.4	3.7
Frank Brickowski	21	3	9.8	.421	.273	.750	1.4	.5	.3	.2	2.0
Hersey Hawkins	21	21	34.0	.452	.344	.895	3.0	2.2	1.3	.2	12.3
Ervin Johnson	18	18	14.1	.371	.000	.818	3.8	.4	.3	.8	3.1
Shawn Kemp	20	20	36.0	.570	.000	.795	10.4	1.5	1.2	2.0	20.9
Nate McMillan	19	0	20.3	.406	.475	.643	3.7	2.7	1.2	.3	4.4
Gary Payton	21	21	43.4	.485	.410	.633	5.1	6.8	1.8	.3	20.7
Sam Perkins	21	1	31.1	.459	.368	.754	4.3	1.7	.7	.3	12.3
Steve Scheffler	8	0	2.8	.000	.000	.000	.8	.3	.1	.0	.0
Detlef Schrempf	21	21	37.6	.475	.368	.750	5.0	3.2	.7	.2	16.0
Eric Snow	10	0	2.4	.143	.000	.000	.4	.6	.2	.0	.2
David Wingate	13	0	5.2	.438	.500	1.000	.2	.0	.0	.0	1.5

Player statistics citation:

== Awards and records ==
=== Awards ===
- Gary Payton was named the Defensive Player of the Year and led the league in total steals and steals per game.

All-NBA Teams

- Shawn Kemp – All-NBA Second Team
- Gary Payton – All-NBA Second Team

NBA All-Defensive Teams

- Gary Payton – All-Defensive First Team

1996 NBA All-Star Game

- Shawn Kemp (fourth appearance, second start)
- Gary Payton (third appearance)

== Transactions ==
=== Trades ===
June 27, 1995	To Seattle SuperSonics Hersey Hawkins; David Wingate	To Charlotte Hornets Kendall Gill
June 28, 1995	To Seattle SuperSonics Eric Snow	To Milwaukee Bucks Aurelijus Zukauskas; 1996 second-round pick
September 18, 1995	To Seattle SuperSonics Frank Brickowski	To Sacramento Kings Byron Houston; Šarūnas Marčiulionis

=== Free agents ===
==== Additions ====
Player	Signed	Former team
Trevor Wilson	October 25	Sacramento Kings

==== Subtractions ====
Player	Left	New team
Dontonio Wingfield	expansion draft, June 24	Toronto Raptors
Bill Cartwright	retired, July 5	
Trevor Wilson	waived, October 31	Somontano Huesca (LEB Oro)

Player transactions citation:

== See also ==
- 1995–96 NBA season
