= 1995–96 Houston Rockets season =

- Head coach: Rudy Tomjanovich
- General manager: Bob Weinhauer
- Owner: Leslie Alexander
- Arena: The Summit

Results
- Record: 48–34 (.585)
- Place: Division: 3rd (Midwest); Conference: 5th (Western)
- Playoff finish: Conference semifinals (lost to SuperSonics 0–4)
- Stats at Basketball Reference

Local media
- Television: KTXH; Prime Sports Southwest
- Radio: KTRH

The 1995–96 Houston Rockets season was the 29th season for the Houston Rockets in the National Basketball Association, and their 25th season in Houston, Texas. The Rockets entered the regular season as the 2-time defending NBA champions, having defeated the Orlando Magic in a four-game sweep in the 1995 NBA Finals, and winning their second consecutive NBA championship.

== Season summary ==
=== Off-season ===
During the off-season, the team signed free agents Mark Bryant and Eldridge Recasner.

For the season, the Rockets redesigned their primary logo, replacing the golden yellow color with dark navy blue, light blue, and silver to their color scheme of red and white. The new primary logo featured a light blue rocket with an angry expression and jagged teeth, flying above the team name "Rockets" in white and silver letters surrounded by light blue, dark navy blue and red outlines, and in front of a red planet with dark navy blue basketball seams. The team also redesigned their home and road uniforms, which featured a V-shaped collar, gradient-faded pinstripes along with the team's primary logo on the front of their jerseys, the jersey number on the upper right side of their jerseys, and red side panels on their shorts. The white home uniforms featured dark navy blue pinstripes, and a red and dark navy blue trim, while the road uniforms were changed from red to dark navy blue, and featured white pinstripes and a red and white trim.

However, the new pinstriped uniforms were criticized, and disliked by both the Rockets players and fans, and were even considered "ugly"; it was also considered a poor choice, after the Rockets recently won back-to-back NBA championships, in which they wore their previous uniforms of their traditional red, golden yellow and white color scheme.

The team's new primary logo, and new pinstriped uniforms would both remain in use until 2003.

=== Regular season ===
With the addition of Bryant and Recasner, the Rockets got off to a fast start by winning ten of their first eleven games of the regular season, and later on held a 31–18 record at the All-Star break. However, injuries were an issue all season long, as Clyde Drexler only played 52 games due to knee and ankle injuries, while Sam Cassell only played 61 games due to elbow and foot injuries, and Mario Elie only appeared in just 45 games due to wrist and arm injuries. At mid-season, the team signed free agent Sam Mack, who previously played in the Continental Basketball Association. Despite the injuries and a seven-game losing streak in March, the Rockets finished in third place in the Midwest Division with a 48–34 record, and earned the fifth seed in the Western Conference.

Hakeem Olajuwon averaged 26.9 points, 10.9 rebounds, 3.6 assists, 1.6 steals and 2.9 blocks per game, and was named to the All-NBA Second Team, and to the NBA All-Defensive Second Team, while Drexler averaged 19.3 points, 7.2 rebounds, 5.8 assists and 2.0 steals per game. In addition, Cassell played a sixth man role off the bench, averaging 14.5 points and 4.6 assists per game, while Robert Horry provided the team with 12.0 points, 5.8 rebounds, 4.0 assists, 1.6 steals and 1.5 blocks per game, and also led them with 142 three-point field goals, Elie provided with 11.1 points per game, and Mack contributed 10.8 points per game. Chucky Brown averaged 8.6 points and 5.4 rebounds per game, while Bryant provided with 8.6 points and 4.9 rebounds per game off the bench, three-point specialist Kenny Smith contributed 8.5 points and 3.6 assists per game, and Recasner contributed 6.9 points and 2.7 assists per game.

During the NBA All-Star weekend at the Alamodome in San Antonio, Texas, Olajuwon and Drexler were both selected for the 1996 NBA All-Star Game, as members of the Western Conference All-Star team. Olajuwon finished in fourth place in Most Valuable Player voting, and also finished in fifth place in Defensive Player of the Year voting, while Cassell finished in fourth place in Sixth Man of the Year voting, and head coach Rudy Tomjanovich finished in fifth place in Coach of the Year voting.

The Rockets finished 19th in the NBA in home-game attendance, with an attendance of 667,840 at The Summit during the regular season.

=== NBA playoffs ===
In the Western Conference First Round of the 1996 NBA playoffs, the Rockets faced off against the 4th–seeded Los Angeles Lakers, who were led by All-Star forward Cedric Ceballos, Nick Van Exel, and All-Star guard Magic Johnson, who came out of his retirement midway through the regular season. The Rockets won Game 1 over the Lakers on the road, 87–83 at the Great Western Forum, but then lost Game 2 on the road, 104–94 as the Lakers evened the series. The Rockets won the next two games at home, which included a Game 4 win over the Lakers at The Summit, 102–94 to win the series in four games; after the Lakers' loss to the Rockets, Johnson retired for the second and final time.

In the Western Conference Semi-finals, the Rockets faced off against the top–seeded, and Pacific Division champion Seattle SuperSonics, who were led by the All-Star trio of Shawn Kemp, Defensive Player of the Year, Gary Payton, and Detlef Schrempf. The Rockets lost the first two games to the SuperSonics on the road at the KeyArena at Seattle Center, and then lost their next two home games, including a Game 4 loss to the SuperSonics at The Summit in overtime, 114–107, thus losing the series in a four-game sweep.

The SuperSonics would advance to the 1996 NBA Finals, but would eventually lose in six games to the Michael Jordan-led Chicago Bulls.

=== Aftermath ===
Following the season, Cassell, Horry, Brown and Bryant were all traded to the Phoenix Suns, while Smith signed as a free agent with the Detroit Pistons, Recasner signed with the Atlanta Hawks, and Chilcutt signed with the Vancouver Grizzlies.

== Draft picks ==
Round	Pick	Player	Position	Nationality	College
2	41	Erik Meek	Center	United States	Duke

== Roster ==
1995–96 Houston Rockets roster
Players

Pos.	No.	Player	Height	Weight	DOB	From
G	9	Melvin Booker	6 ft 2 in (1.88 m)	185 lb (84 kg)	1972–08–20	Missouri
F	15	Tim Breaux	6 ft 7 in (2.01 m)	215 lb (98 kg)	1970–09–19	Wyoming
F	52	Chucky Brown	6 ft 7 in (2.01 m)	214 lb (97 kg)	1968–02–29	NC State
F	2	Mark Bryant	6 ft 9 in (2.06 m)	245 lb (111 kg)	1965–04–25	Seton Hall
G	10	Sam Cassell	6 ft 3 in (1.91 m)	185 lb (84 kg)	1969–11–18	Florida State
F	32	Pete Chilcutt	6 ft 10 in (2.08 m)	230 lb (104 kg)	1968–09–14	North Carolina
G	22	Clyde Drexler	6 ft 7 in (2.01 m)	210 lb (95 kg)	1962–06–22	Houston
G/F	17	Mario Elie	6 ft 5 in (1.96 m)	210 lb (95 kg)	1963–11–26	American International
F	25	Robert Horry	6 ft 10 in (2.08 m)	220 lb (100 kg)	1970–08–25	Alabama
F/C	27	Charles Jones	6 ft 9 in (2.06 m)	215 lb (98 kg)	1957–04–03	Albany State
F	4	Sam Mack	6 ft 7 in (2.01 m)	220 lb (100 kg)	1970–05–26	Houston
G	20	Tracy Moore	6 ft 4 in (1.93 m)	200 lb (91 kg)	1965–12–28	Tulsa
C	34	Hakeem Olajuwon	7 ft 0 in (2.13 m)	255 lb (116 kg)	1963–01–21	Houston
G	3	Eldridge Recasner	6 ft 3 in (1.91 m)	190 lb (86 kg)	1967–12–14	Washington
G	30	Kenny Smith	6 ft 3 in (1.91 m)	170 lb (77 kg)	1965–03–08	North Carolina

Coaches
Head coach
- Rudy Tomjanovich
Assistant(s)
- Bill Berry
- Jim Boylen
- Carroll Dawson
- Larry Smith

Legend
- (DP) Unsigned draft pick
- (FA) Free agent
- (S) Suspended
- Injured

Roster

== Regular season ==
=== Season standings ===
Midwest Division	W	L	PCT	GB	Home	Road	Div
y-San Antonio Spurs	59	23	.720	–	33–8	26–15	19–5
x-Utah Jazz	55	27	.671	4	34–7	21–20	14–10
x-Houston Rockets	48	34	.585	11	27–14	21–20	15–9
Denver Nuggets	35	47	.427	24	24–17	11–30	13–11
Minnesota Timberwolves	26	56	.317	33	17–24	9–32	10–14
Dallas Mavericks	26	56	.317	33	16–25	10–31	10–14
Vancouver Grizzlies	15	67	.183	44	10–31	5–36	3–21

Western Conference
#	Team	W	L	PCT	GB	GP
1	c-Seattle SuperSonics *	64	18	.780	–	82
2	y-San Antonio Spurs *	59	23	.720	5	82
3	x-Utah Jazz	55	27	.671	9	82
4	x-Los Angeles Lakers	53	29	.646	11	82
5	x-Houston Rockets	48	34	.585	16	82
6	x-Portland Trail Blazers	44	38	.537	20	82
7	x-Phoenix Suns	41	41	.500	23	82
8	x-Sacramento Kings	39	43	.476	25	82
9	Golden State Warriors	36	46	.439	28	82
10	Denver Nuggets	35	47	.427	29	82
11	Los Angeles Clippers	29	53	.354	35	82
12	Minnesota Timberwolves	26	56	.317	38	82
13	Dallas Mavericks	26	56	.317	38	82
14	Vancouver Grizzlies	15	67	.183	49	82

z – clinched division title
y – clinched division title
x – clinched playoff spot

== Playoffs ==
1996 playoff game log
First Round: 3–1 (home: 2–0; road: 1–1)

Game	Date	Team	Score	High points	High rebounds	High assists	Location Attendance	Series
1	April 25	@ L.A. Lakers	W 87–83	Hakeem Olajuwon (33)	Horry, Olajuwon (7)	Drexler, Smith (4)	Great Western Forum; 17,505	1–0
2	April 27	@ L.A. Lakers	L 94–104	Sam Cassell (22)	Horry, Olajuwon (8)	Sam Cassell (8)	Great Western Forum; 17,505	1–1
3	April 30	L.A. Lakers	W 104–98	Hakeem Olajuwon (30)	Robert Horry (10)	Clyde Drexler (11)	The Summit; 16,285	2–1
4	May 2	L.A. Lakers	W 102–94	Hakeem Olajuwon (25)	Hakeem Olajuwon (11)	Olajuwon, Drexler (7)	The Summit; 16,285	3–1

Conference semifinals: 0–4 (home: 0–2; road: 0–2)

Game	Date	Team	Score	High points	High rebounds	High assists	Location Attendance	Series
1	May 4	@ Seattle	L 75–108	Robert Horry (18)	Clyde Drexler (9)	Kenny Smith (5)	KeyArena; 17,072	0–1
2	May 6	@ Seattle	L 101–105	Clyde Drexler (19)	Hakeem Olajuwon (16)	Kenny Smith (7)	KeyArena; 17,072	0–2
3	May 10	Seattle	L 112–115	Clyde Drexler (28)	Hakeem Olajuwon (13)	Kenny Smith (11)	The Summit; 16,285	0–3
4	May 12	Seattle	L 107–114 (OT)	Hakeem Olajuwon (26)	Clyde Drexler (15)	Drexler, Cassell (6)	The Summit; 16,611	0–4

1996 schedule

== Player statistics ==
Legend
GP	Games played	GS	Games started	MPG	Minutes per game
FG%	Field-goal percentage	3P%	3-point field-goal percentage	FT%	Free-throw percentage
RPG	Rebounds per game	APG	Assists per game	SPG	Steals per game
BPG	Blocks per game	PPG	Points per game

=== Season ===
Player	GP	GS	MPG	FG%	3FG%	FT%	RPG	APG	SPG	BPG	PPG
Melvin Booker	11	0	11.9	.320	.158	.818	.8	1.9	.5	.1	4.0
Tim Breaux	54	4	10.6	.366	.326	.622	1.1	.4	.2	.1	3.0
Chucky Brown	82	82	24.6	.541	.125	.693	5.4	1.1	.6	.5	8.6
Mark Bryant	71	9	22.4	.543	.000	.718	4.9	.7	.4	.3	8.6
Sam Cassell	61	0	27.6	.439	.348	.825	3.1	4.6	.9	.1	14.5
Pete Chilcutt	74	0	8.8	.408	.378	.654	2.1	.4	.3	.2	2.7
Clyde Drexler	52	51	38.4	.433	.332	.784	7.2	5.8	2.0	.5	19.3
Mario Elie	45	16	30.8	.504	.323	.852	3.4	3.1	1.0	.2	11.1
Alvin Heggs	4	0	3.5	.600		.667	.5	.0	.0	.0	2.0
Robert Horry	71	71	37.1	.410	.366	.776	5.8	4.0	1.6	1.5	12.0
Jaren Jackson	4	0	8.3	.000	.000	.800	.8	.0	.3	.0	2.0
Henry James	7	0	8.3	.417	.333	1.000	.9	.3	.0	.0	4.3
Charles Jones	46	0	6.5	.316		.308	1.6	.3	.1	.5	.3
Sam Mack	31	20	28.0	.422	.400	.848	3.2	2.5	.7	.3	10.8
Tracy Moore	8	2	23.8	.395	.433	.947	2.8	.8	.3	.0	11.4
Hakeem Olajuwon	72	72	38.8	.514	.214	.724	10.9	3.6	1.6	2.9	26.9
Eldridge Recasner	63	27	20.2	.415	.424	.864	2.3	2.7	.4	.1	6.9
Kenny Smith	68	56	23.8	.433	.382	.821	1.4	3.6	.7	.0	8.5

=== Playoffs ===
Player	GP	GS	MPG	FG%	3FG%	FT%	RPG	APG	SPG	BPG	PPG
Chucky Brown	8	8	21.0	.556		.833	3.0	.6	.4	.0	8.1
Mark Bryant	8	0	18.1	.600		.800	3.4	.5	.1	.3	6.8
Sam Cassell	8	0	25.8	.321	.276	.793	2.1	4.3	.8	.1	10.4
Pete Chilcutt	1	0	10.0	.250	.000	.000	3.0	.0	.0	.0	2.0
Clyde Drexler	8	8	36.5	.415	.265	.765	7.8	5.0	2.6	.5	16.6
Mario Elie	8	0	29.1	.439	.375	.917	2.8	1.8	.9	.4	9.8
Robert Horry	8	8	38.5	.407	.396	.435	7.1	3.0	2.6	1.6	13.1
Charles Jones	3	0	2.7	.000			.3	.0	.0	.0	.0
Sam Mack	6	0	7.8	.333	.222	.000	1.5	.2	.2	.0	2.0
Hakeem Olajuwon	8	8	41.1	.510	.000	.725	9.1	3.9	1.9	2.1	22.4
Eldridge Recasner	1	0	8.0	.000	.000		1.0	2.0	.0	.0	.0
Kenny Smith	8	8	23.9	.434	.387	1.000	1.5	4.8	.6	.0	8.9

Player statistics citation:

== Awards and records ==
- During the preseason period, the Rockets would win the 1995 McDonald's Championship from October 19-21, winning the championship match over Italy's Buckler Beer Bologna.

=== Season ===
- Hakeem Olajuwon was named to the All-NBA Second Team, as well as the NBA All-Defensive Second Team.

== See also ==
- 1995–96 NBA season
