= 1995–96 Portland Trail Blazers season =

NBA professional basketball team season

- Head coach: P. J. Carlesimo
- Arena: Rose Garden Arena

Results
- Record: 44–38 (.537)
- Place: Division: 4th (Pacific); Conference: 6th (Western)
- Playoff finish: First round (lost to Jazz 2–3)
- Stats at Basketball Reference

Local media
- Television: KGW; Prime Sports Northwest
- Radio: KEX

The 1995–96 Portland Trail Blazers season was the 26th season for the Portland Trail Blazers in the National Basketball Association.

== Season summary ==
=== Off-season ===
After spending their first 25 years at the Memorial Coliseum, the team began playing at the new Rose Garden Arena this season. The Trail Blazers acquired the eighth overall pick in the 1995 NBA draft from the Detroit Pistons via trade, and selected shooting guard Shawn Respert out of Michigan State University, but soon traded him to the Milwaukee Bucks in exchange for rookie power forward, and first-round draft pick Gary Trent out of Ohio University. During the off-season, the team signed free agent and second-year forward Dontonio Wingfield. Rookie center Arvydas Sabonis from Lithuania, who was drafted by the Trail Blazers as the 24th overall pick in the 1986 NBA draft, made his debut in the NBA this season.

=== Regular season ===
With the addition of Sabonis and Trent, the Trail Blazers struggled losing six of their first nine games of the regular season, but then won eight of their next eleven games. However, the team posted a six-game losing streak afterwards, and later on held a 24–24 record at the All-Star break. The Trail Blazers fell below .500 in winning percentage by losing ten of their next twelve games, holding a 26–34 record as of March 5, 1996. However, the team won 18 of their final 22 games of the season, which included a six-game winning streak in March, and a seven-game winning streak between March and April. The Trail Blazers finished in fourth place in the Pacific Division with a 44–38 record, which was the same record as the previous season, and earned the sixth seed in the Western Conference; the team qualified for the NBA playoffs for the 14th consecutive year, and also for the 19th time in 20 years.

Clifford Robinson averaged 21.1 points and 5.7 rebounds per game, and led the Trail Blazers with 178 three-point field goals, while Rod Strickland averaged 18.7 points, 9.6 assists and 1.4 steals per game, and Sabonis provided the team with 14.5 points and 8.1 rebounds per game, and was named to the NBA All-Rookie First Team. In addition, second-year guard Aaron McKie contributed 10.7 points per game, while Harvey Grant provided with 9.3 points and 4.8 rebounds per game. Off the bench, James Robinson contributed 8.5 points per game and 102 three-point field goals, and Trent provided with 7.5 points and 3.4 rebounds per game. On the defensive side, Buck Williams averaged 7.3 points and 5.8 rebounds per game off the bench, and Chris Dudley contributed 5.1 points, 9.0 rebounds and 1.3 blocks per game.

During the NBA All-Star weekend at the Alamodome in San Antonio, Texas, Clifford Robinson participated in the NBA Three-Point Shootout, while Sabonis was selected for the NBA Rookie Game, as a member of the Western Conference Rookie team. Sabonis finished in second place in Rookie of the Year voting, behind Damon Stoudamire of the expansion Toronto Raptors, and also finished in second place in Sixth Man of the Year voting, behind Toni Kukoč of the Chicago Bulls.

The Trail Blazers finished fourth in the NBA in home-game attendance, with an attendance of 848,055 at the Rose Garden Arena during the regular season. In addition, this season also saw the Trail Blazers fail to sell out a home game, ending their 814-game sellout streak, for the first time since 1977; this streak would be the longest in NBA history until the Dallas Mavericks broke it during the 2019–20 season.

=== NBA playoffs ===
In the Western Conference First Round of the 1996 NBA playoffs, the Trail Blazers faced off against the 3rd–seeded Utah Jazz, who were led by the trio of All-Star forward Karl Malone, All-Star guard John Stockton, and Jeff Hornacek. The Trail Blazers lost the first two games to the Jazz on the road at the Delta Center, but managed to win the next two games at home, which included a Game 4 win over the Jazz at the Rose Garden Arena, 98–90 to even the series. However, the Trail Blazers lost Game 5 to the Jazz at the Delta Center, suffering a 38-point margin by a score of 102–64, thus losing in a hard-fought five-game series; it was the fourth consecutive year that the Trail Blazers lost in the opening round of the NBA playoffs.

=== Aftermath ===
Following the season, Strickland, who feuded with head coach P.J. Carlesimo during the regular season, was traded along with Grant to the Washington Bullets, whom Grant used to play for, while Williams signed as a free agent with the New York Knicks, and James Robinson was traded to the Minnesota Timberwolves.

== Draft picks ==
Round	Pick	Player	Position	Nationality	School/Club team
1	8	Shawn Respert	SG/PG	United States	Michigan State

== Roster ==
1995–96 Portland Trail Blazers roster
Players

Pos.	No.	Player	Height	Weight	DOB	From
G	12	Randolph Childress (injured)	6 ft 2 in (1.88 m)	188 lb (85 kg)	1972–09–21	Wake Forest
F	38	Anthony Cook	6 ft 9 in (2.06 m)	205 lb (93 kg)	1967–03–19	Arizona
F	–	Bill Curley (injured) (IN)	6 ft 9 in (2.06 m)	220 lb (100 kg)	1972–05–29	Boston College
C	24	Chris Dudley	6 ft 11 in (2.11 m)	235 lb (107 kg)	1965–02–22	Yale
F	44	Harvey Grant	6 ft 8 in (2.03 m)	195 lb (88 kg)	1965–07–04	Oklahoma
G	23	Aaron McKie	6 ft 5 in (1.96 m)	209 lb (95 kg)	1972–10–02	Temple
F	3	Clifford Robinson	6 ft 10 in (2.08 m)	225 lb (102 kg)	1966–12–16	Connecticut
G	26	James Robinson	6 ft 2 in (1.88 m)	180 lb (82 kg)	1970–08–31	Alabama
G	21	Rumeal Robinson	6 ft 2 in (1.88 m)	195 lb (88 kg)	1966–11–13	Michigan
C	11	Arvydas Sabonis	7 ft 3 in (2.21 m)	279 lb (127 kg)	1964–12–19	Lithuania
C	27	Elmore Spencer	7 ft 0 in (2.13 m)	270 lb (122 kg)	1969–12–06	UNLV
G	1	Rod Strickland	6 ft 3 in (1.91 m)	175 lb (79 kg)	1966–07–11	DePaul
F	33	Gary Trent	6 ft 8 in (2.03 m)	250 lb (113 kg)	1974–09–22	Ohio
F	52	Buck Williams	6 ft 8 in (2.03 m)	215 lb (98 kg)	1960–03–08	Maryland
F	10	Dontonio Wingfield	6 ft 8 in (2.03 m)	256 lb (116 kg)	1974–06–23	Cincinnati

Coaches
Head coach
- P. J. Carlesimo
Assistant(s)
- Rick Carlisle
- Johnny Davis
- Dick Harter

Legend
- (DP) Unsigned draft pick
- (FA) Free agent
- (S) Suspended
- (IN) Inactive
- Injured

Roster

=== Roster Notes ===
- Power forward Bill Curley was on the injured reserve list due to an ankle injury, missed the entire regular season, and never played for the Trail Blazers.

== Regular season ==
=== Season standings ===
Pacific Division	W	L	PCT	GB	Home	Road	Div
c-Seattle SuperSonics	64	18	.780	–	38–3	26–15	21–3
x-Los Angeles Lakers	53	29	.646	11	30–11	23–18	17–7
x-Portland Trail Blazers	44	38	.537	20	26–15	18–23	11–13
x-Phoenix Suns	41	41	.500	23	25–16	16–25	9–15
x-Sacramento Kings	39	43	.476	25	26–15	13–28	11–13
Golden State Warriors	36	46	.439	28	23–18	13–28	7–17
Los Angeles Clippers	29	53	.354	35	19–22	10–31	7–17

Western Conference
#	Team	W	L	PCT	GB	GP
1	c-Seattle SuperSonics *	64	18	.780	–	82
2	y-San Antonio Spurs *	59	23	.720	5	82
3	x-Utah Jazz	55	27	.671	9	82
4	x-Los Angeles Lakers	53	29	.646	11	82
5	x-Houston Rockets	48	34	.585	16	82
6	x-Portland Trail Blazers	44	38	.537	20	82
7	x-Phoenix Suns	41	41	.500	23	82
8	x-Sacramento Kings	39	43	.476	25	82
9	Golden State Warriors	36	46	.439	28	82
10	Denver Nuggets	35	47	.427	29	82
11	Los Angeles Clippers	29	53	.354	35	82
12	Minnesota Timberwolves	26	56	.317	38	82
13	Dallas Mavericks	26	56	.317	38	82
14	Vancouver Grizzlies	15	67	.183	49	82

z – clinched division title
y – clinched division title
x – clinched playoff spot

== Playoffs ==
1996 playoff game log
First round: 2–3 (home: 2–0; road: 0–3)

Game	Date	Team	Score	High points	High rebounds	High assists	Location Attendance	Series
1	April 25	@ Utah	L 102–110	Rod Strickland (27)	Chris Dudley (10)	Rod Strickland (12)	Delta Center; 19,614	0–1
2	April 27	@ Utah	L 90–105	Arvydas Sabonis (26)	Arvydas Sabonis (12)	Rod Strickland (7)	Delta Center; 19,911	0–2
3	April 29	Utah	W 94–91 (OT)	Arvydas Sabonis (27)	Arvydas Sabonis (12)	Rod Strickland (8)	Rose Garden; 21,401	1–2
4	May 1	Utah	W 98–90	Rod Strickland (27)	Arvydas Sabonis (13)	Rod Strickland (7)	Rose Garden; 21,401	2–2
5	May 5	@ Utah	L 64–102	Arvydas Sabonis (14)	Arvydas Sabonis (8)	Rod Strickland (8)	Delta Center; 19,682	2–3

1996 schedule

== Player statistics ==
Legend
GP	Games played	GS	Games started	MPG	Minutes per game
FG%	Field-goal percentage	3P%	3-point field-goal percentage	FT%	Free-throw percentage
RPG	Rebounds per game	APG	Assists per game	SPG	Steals per game
BPG	Blocks per game	PPG	Points per game

=== Regular season ===
Player	GP	GS	MPG	FG%	3P%	FT%	RPG	APG	SPG	BPG	PPG
Aaron McKie	81	73	27.9	.467	.325	.764	3.8	2.5	1.1	.3	10.7
Chris Dudley	80	61	24.1	.453	.000	.510	9.0	.5	.5	1.3	5.1
Clifford Robinson	78	76	38.2	.423	.378	.664	5.7	2.4	1.1	.9	21.1
Harvey Grant	76	75	31.5	.462	.313	.545	4.8	1.5	.8	.6	9.3
James Robinson	76	5	21.4	.399	.359	.659	2.1	2.0	.4	.2	8.5
Arvydas Sabonis	73	21	23.8	.545	.375	.757	8.1	1.8	.9	1.1	14.5
Buck Williams	70	10	23.9	.500	.667	.668	5.8	.6	.6	.7	7.3
Gary Trent	69	10	17.7	.513	.000	.553	3.4	.7	.4	.2	7.5
Rod Strickland	67	63	37.7	.460	.342	.652	4.4	9.6	1.4	.2	18.7
Dontonio Wingfield	44	2	11.1	.382	.302	.765	2.4	.6	.5	.1	3.8
Rumeal Robinson	43	14	16.6	.416	.380	.647	1.8	3.3	.6	.1	5.7
Randolph Childress	28	0	8.9	.316	.277	.815	.7	1.1	.3	.0	3.0
Anthony Cook	11	0	5.5	.438	.000	.250	1.1	.2	.0	.1	1.4
Elmore Spencer^{†}	11	0	3.4	.417		.667	.8	.1	.0	.2	1.3
Reggie Slater^{†}	4	0	5.0	.600			.8	.0	.3	.5	1.5

=== Playoffs ===
Player	GP	GS	MPG	FG%	3P%	FT%	RPG	APG	SPG	BPG	PPG
Rod Strickland	5	5	40.4	.440	.500	.639	6.2	8.4	1.0	.0	20.6
Clifford Robinson	5	5	36.2	.344	.261	.757	3.6	1.6	1.4	1.0	15.2
Arvydas Sabonis	5	5	35.4	.432	.556	.717	10.2	1.8	.8	.6	23.6
Harvey Grant	5	5	32.8	.342	.143	.000	4.0	.8	.0	.4	5.4
Aaron McKie	5	4	26.8	.367	.250	.778	3.6	1.8	1.2	.4	6.2
Buck Williams	5	1	26.6	.391	.500	.714	5.0	.2	.2	.8	4.8
Chris Dudley	5	0	18.4	.385		.667	5.4	.2	.4	.4	2.8
Dontonio Wingfield	5	0	12.4	.381	.600	.333	2.8	.8	.0	.0	4.8
Rumeal Robinson	5	0	8.6	.421	.444	.250	.4	.6	.6	.0	4.2
James Robinson	2	0	13.0	.300	.333		.5	1.5	.5	.5	4.0
Gary Trent	2	0	5.0	.250			.5	.0	.5	.0	1.0
Elmore Spencer	1	0	1.0			.000	.0	.0	.0	.0	.0

- ^{†} Denotes player spent time with another team in the season. Stats reflect time with the Trail Blazers only.

Player statistics citation:

== Awards and honors ==
- Arvydas Sabonis, All-NBA Rookie First Team

== Transactions ==
=== Free agents ===
Subtractions
Player	Date signed	New team
Jerome Kersey	Expansion Draft June 24, 1995	Toronto Raptors
