= 1995–96 Sacramento Kings season =

NBA professional basketball team season

- Head coach: Garry St. Jean
- President: Geoff Petrie
- General manager: Geoff Petrie
- Owner: Jim Thomas
- Arena: ARCO Arena

Results
- Record: 39–43 (.476)
- Place: Division: 5th (Pacific); Conference: 8th (Western)
- Playoff finish: First round (lost to SuperSonics 1–3)
- Stats at Basketball Reference

Local media
- Television: KPWB-TV; SportsChannel Pacific
- Radio: KHTK

The 1995–96 Sacramento Kings season was the 47th season for the Sacramento Kings in the National Basketball Association, and their eleventh season in Sacramento, California.

== Season summary ==
=== Off-season ===
The Kings received the 13th overall pick in the 1995 NBA draft, and selected power forward Corliss Williamson from the University of Arkansas, and also selected point guard Tyus Edney from the University of California, Los Angeles with the 47th overall pick. During the off-season, the team acquired Šarūnas Marčiulionis from the Seattle SuperSonics, and acquired Tyrone Corbin from the Atlanta Hawks.

=== Regular season ===
With the addition of Edney and Marčiulionis, the Kings got off to a fast start by winning their first five games of the regular season. The team played above .500 in winning percentage with a 19–9 start to the season, and later on held a 24–20 record at the All-Star break. However, after holding a 24–17 record as of February 3, 1996, the Kings struggled posting an 11-game losing streak in February, falling below .500. At mid-season, the team traded Corbin, and Walt Williams to the Miami Heat in exchange for Billy Owens, and Kevin Gamble. Despite their struggles, the Kings managed to win 9 of their final 14 games of the season, finishing in fifth place in the Pacific Division with a 39–43 record, which was the same record as the previous season, and earning the eighth seed in the Western Conference. The team qualified for the NBA playoffs for the first time since the 1985–86 season, ending a nine-year playoff drought; it was also their second playoff appearance since relocating from Kansas City, Missouri to Sacramento in 1985.

Mitch Richmond averaged 23.1 points and 1.5 steals per game, led the Kings with 225 three-point field goals, and was named to the All-NBA Third Team, while second-year forward Brian Grant averaged 14.4 points, 7.0 rebounds and 1.3 blocks per game, and Olden Polynice provided the team with 12.2 points and 9.4 rebounds per game. In addition, Edney contributed 10.8 points and 6.1 assists per game, and was named to the NBA All-Rookie Second Team, while Owens provided with 9.9 points and 5.7 rebounds per game in 22 games after the trade. Off the bench, Marčiulionis contributed 10.8 points per game, but only played 53 games due to a knee injury, while second-year forward Michael Smith averaged 5.5 points and 6.0 rebounds per game, and Williamson contributed 5.6 points per game. Meanwhile, Lionel Simmons provided with 4.6 points and 2.7 rebounds per game, Duane Causwell averaged 3.4 points, 3.4 rebounds and 1.1 blocks per game, and Bobby Hurley contributed 3.1 points and 3.0 assists per game, but struggled shooting just .283 in field-goal percentage.

During the NBA All-Star weekend at the Alamodome in San Antonio, Texas, Richmond was selected for the 1996 NBA All-Star Game, as a member of the Western Conference All-Star team, while Edney was selected for the NBA Rookie Game, as a member of the Western Conference Rookie team. Richmond also finished tied in 16th place in Most Valuable Player voting.

The Kings finished twelfth in the NBA in home-game attendance, with an attendance of 709,999 at the ARCO Arena II during the regular season.

=== NBA playoffs ===
In the Western Conference First Round of the 1996 NBA playoffs, the Kings faced off against the top–seeded, and Pacific Division champion Seattle SuperSonics, who were led by the All-Star trio of Shawn Kemp, Defensive Player of the Year, Gary Payton, and Detlef Schrempf. The Kings lost Game 1 to the SuperSonics on the road, 97–85 at the KeyArena at Seattle Center, but managed to win Game 2 on the road, 90–81, in which Richmond scored 37 points to even the series. However, the Kings lost the next two games at home, which included a Game 4 loss at the ARCO Arena II, 101–87, in which Richmond sprained his ankle, as the Kings lost the series to the SuperSonics in four games; it was also their only NBA playoff appearance with Richmond on the team.

The SuperSonics would advance to the 1996 NBA Finals, but would lose in six games to the Chicago Bulls.

=== Notable incidents ===
One notable incident of the regular season occurred on November 10, 1995, during a road game against the Indiana Pacers at the Market Square Arena, in which a brawl occurred. During the third quarter, Hurley drove into the lane and was fouled hard by Pacers forward Dale Davis; Smith confronted Davis, as both players fought with each other. Players from both teams left the bench to break up the fight. A total of 16 players were fined and suspended; Davis and Smith were both suspended for two games and fined $20,000, while 14 players, seven from each team, were all suspended for one game for leaving the bench during an altercation. 13 of the players that left the bench were all fined $2,500, while Causwell was fined $7,500, because he did not try to break up the fight.

The Kings defeated the Pacers by a score of 119–95.

=== Aftermath ===
Following the season, Marčiulionis was traded to the Denver Nuggets after only one season with the Kings.

== Draft picks ==
Round	Pick	Player	Position	Nationality	College
1	13	Corliss Williamson	PF/SF	United States	Arkansas
2	47	Tyus Edney	PG	United States	UCLA
2	51	Dejan Bodiroga	SF	Serbia	

== Roster ==
1995–96 Sacramento Kings roster
Players

Pos.	No.	Player	Height	Weight	DOB	From
C	31	Duane Causwell	7 ft 0 in (2.13 m)	240 lb (109 kg)	1968–05–31	Temple
G	5	Tyus Edney	5 ft 10 in (1.78 m)	152 lb (69 kg)	1973–02–14	UCLA
G/F	40	Kevin Gamble	6 ft 5 in (1.96 m)	210 lb (95 kg)	1965–11–13	Iowa
F	33	Brian Grant	6 ft 9 in (2.06 m)	254 lb (115 kg)	1972–03–05	Xavier
F	35	Byron Houston	6 ft 5 in (1.96 m)	250 lb (113 kg)	1969–11–22	Oklahoma State
G	7	Bobby Hurley	6 ft 0 in (1.83 m)	165 lb (75 kg)	1971–06–28	Duke
G	13	Šarūnas Marčiulionis	6 ft 5 in (1.96 m)	200 lb (91 kg)	1964–06–13	Lithuania
G	20	Clint McDaniel	6 ft 4 in (1.93 m)	180 lb (82 kg)	1972–02–26	Arkansas
F	30	Billy Owens	6 ft 8 in (2.03 m)	220 lb (100 kg)	1969–05–01	Syracuse
C	0	Olden Polynice	6 ft 11 in (2.11 m)	220 lb (100 kg)	1964–11–21	Virginia
G	2	Mitch Richmond	6 ft 5 in (1.96 m)	215 lb (98 kg)	1965–06–30	Kansas State
F	22	Lionel Simmons	6 ft 7 in (2.01 m)	210 lb (95 kg)	1968–11–14	La Salle
F	34	Michael Smith	6 ft 8 in (2.03 m)	230 lb (104 kg)	1972–03–28	Providence
F	4	Corliss Williamson	6 ft 7 in (2.01 m)	245 lb (111 kg)	1973–12–04	Arkansas

Coaches
Head coach
- Garry St. Jean
Assistant(s)
- Mike Bratz
- Eddie Jordan

Legend
- (DP) Unsigned draft pick
- (FA) Free agent
- (S) Suspended
- Injured

Roster
Updated: February 22, 1996

== Regular season ==
=== Season standings ===
Pacific Division	W	L	PCT	GB	Home	Road	Div
c-Seattle SuperSonics	64	18	.780	–	38–3	26–15	21–3
x-Los Angeles Lakers	53	29	.646	11	30–11	23–18	17–7
x-Portland Trail Blazers	44	38	.537	20	26–15	18–23	11–13
x-Phoenix Suns	41	41	.500	23	25–16	16–25	9–15
x-Sacramento Kings	39	43	.476	25	26–15	13–28	11–13
Golden State Warriors	36	46	.439	28	23–18	13–28	7–17
Los Angeles Clippers	29	53	.354	35	19–22	10–31	7–17

Western Conference
#	Team	W	L	PCT	GB	GP
1	c-Seattle SuperSonics *	64	18	.780	–	82
2	y-San Antonio Spurs *	59	23	.720	5	82
3	x-Utah Jazz	55	27	.671	9	82
4	x-Los Angeles Lakers	53	29	.646	11	82
5	x-Houston Rockets	48	34	.585	16	82
6	x-Portland Trail Blazers	44	38	.537	20	82
7	x-Phoenix Suns	41	41	.500	23	82
8	x-Sacramento Kings	39	43	.476	25	82
9	Golden State Warriors	36	46	.439	28	82
10	Denver Nuggets	35	47	.427	29	82
11	Los Angeles Clippers	29	53	.354	35	82
12	Minnesota Timberwolves	26	56	.317	38	82
13	Dallas Mavericks	26	56	.317	38	82
14	Vancouver Grizzlies	15	67	.183	49	82

z – clinched conference title
y – clinched division title
x – clinched playoff spot

== Playoffs ==
1996 playoff game log
First round: 1–3 (home: 0–2; road: 1–1)

Game	Date	Team	Score	High points	High rebounds	High assists	Location Attendance	Series
1	April 26	@ Seattle	L 85–97	Mitch Richmond (18)	Olden Polynice (9)	Mitch Richmond (4)	KeyArena; 17,072	0–1
2	April 28	@ Seattle	W 90–81	Mitch Richmond (37)	Olden Polynice (16)	Owens, Marciulionis (5)	KeyArena; 17,072	1–1
3	April 30	Seattle	L 89–96	Mitch Richmond (24)	Olden Polynice (14)	Billy Owens (6)	ARCO Arena; 17,317	1–2
4	May 2	Seattle	L 87–101	Lionel Simmons (24)	Polynice, Smith (9)	Lionel Simmons (3)	ARCO Arena; 17,317	1–3

1996 schedule

== Player statistics ==
Legend
GP	Games played	GS	Games started	MPG	Minutes per game
FG%	Field-goal percentage	3P%	3-point field-goal percentage	FT%	Free-throw percentage
RPG	Rebounds per game	APG	Assists per game	SPG	Steals per game
BPG	Blocks per game	PPG	Points per game

=== Regular season ===
Player	GP	GS	MPG	FG%	3P%	FT%	RPG	APG	SPG	BPG	PPG
Mitch Richmond	81	81	36.4	.447	.437	.866	3.3	3.1	1.5	.2	23.1
Olden Polynice	81	80	30.1	.527	.333	.601	9.4	.7	.6	.8	12.2
Tyus Edney	80	60	31.0	.412	.368	.782	2.5	6.1	1.1	.0	10.8
Brian Grant	78	75	30.7	.507	.235	.732	7.0	1.6	.5	1.3	14.4
Duane Causwell	73	26	14.3	.417	.000	.729	3.4	.3	.4	1.1	3.4
Bobby Hurley	72	22	14.7	.283	.289	.800	1.0	3.0	.4	.0	3.1
Michael Smith	65	0	21.3	.605	1.000	.384	6.0	1.7	.7	.7	5.5
Lionel Simmons	54	5	15.0	.396	.373	.733	2.7	1.5	.6	.4	4.6
Corliss Williamson	53	3	11.5	.466	.000	.560	2.2	.4	.2	.2	5.6
Šarūnas Marčiulionis	53	0	19.6	.452	.408	.775	1.5	2.2	1.0	.1	10.8
Tyrone Corbin^{†}	49	2	19.0	.452	.083	.837	3.7	1.2	1.0	.3	6.4
Walt Williams^{†}	45	45	30.7	.435	.341	.756	4.6	3.7	1.2	.9	14.6
Byron Houston	25	0	11.0	.500	.333	.808	3.4	.3	.5	.3	3.4
Billy Owens^{†}	22	11	27.0	.420	.417	.643	5.7	3.2	.9	.7	9.9
Kevin Gamble^{†}	21	0	13.9	.427	.261	.500	1.3	.9	.2	.1	3.9
Clint McDaniel	12	0	5.9	.348	.333	.750	.8	.6	.4	.0	2.5

=== Playoffs ===
Player	GP	GS	MPG	FG%	3P%	FT%	RPG	APG	SPG	BPG	PPG
Mitch Richmond	4	4	36.5	.444	.348	.800	4.3	3.0	.8	.0	21.0
Olden Polynice	4	4	35.3	.522	1.000	.667	12.0	.8	.3	1.8	13.8
Billy Owens	4	4	32.8	.441	.000	.500	6.5	3.5	1.0	.3	8.3
Brian Grant	4	4	31.0	.381		.500	5.0	1.0	.5	1.8	9.8
Tyus Edney	4	4	30.3	.429	.250	.833	3.0	2.8	2.0	.0	12.0
Šarūnas Marčiulionis	4	0	25.3	.276	.222	.600	1.8	3.5	2.5	.0	7.3
Michael Smith	4	0	21.8	.583		.455	5.5	2.0	.3	.5	4.8
Lionel Simmons	4	0	19.3	.455	.333	.714	3.0	2.0	1.5	.5	9.5
Duane Causwell	2	0	12.5	.333	.000	.750	2.5	.5	.0	.0	2.5
Kevin Gamble	2	0	1.5				.0	.0	.0	.0	.0
Corliss Williamson	1	0	2.0	.000		1.000	.0	.0	.0	.0	1.0
Bobby Hurley	1	0	2.0				.0	.0	.0	.0	.0

- ^{†} Denotes player spent time with another team in the season. Stats reflect time with the Kings only.

Player statistics citation:

== Awards and records ==
- Mitch Richmond, NBA All-Star Game
- Mitch Richmond, All-NBA Third Team
- Tyus Edney, NBA All-Rookie 2nd Team

== Transactions ==
=== Trades ===
September 18, 1995
February 22, 1995
To Sacramento Kings----
- Byron Houston
- Šarūnas Marčiulionis
To Sacramento Kings----
- Kevin Gamble
- Billy Owens
To Seattle SuperSonics----
- Frank Brickowski
To Miami Heat----
- Tyrone Corbin
- Walt Williams

Player transactions citation:

== See also ==
- 1995–96 NBA season
