= 1995–96 San Antonio Spurs season =

- Division champions
- Head coach: Bob Hill
- President: Gregg Popovich (vice)
- General manager: Gregg Popovich
- Owner: Peter Holt
- Arena: Alamodome

Results
- Record: 59–23 (.720)
- Place: Division: 1st (Midwest); Conference: 2nd (Western)
- Playoff finish: Conference semifinals (lost to Jazz 2–4)
- Stats at Basketball Reference

Local media
- Television: KSAT-TV; KABB; Prime Sports Southwest
- Radio: WOAI

The 1995–96 San Antonio Spurs season was the 20th season for the San Antonio Spurs in the National Basketball Association, and their 29th season as a franchise. The city of San Antonio, Texas hosted the NBA All-Star weekend at the Alamodome this season.

== Season summary ==
=== Off-season ===
During the off-season, the team acquired Will Perdue from the Chicago Bulls, and signed free agents Carl Herrera, who previously won two NBA championships with the Houston Rockets, former Spurs center Greg Anderson, and three-point specialist Brad Lohaus.

=== Regular season ===
With the addition of Perdue, the Spurs got off to a solid 11–4 start to the regular season, and later on held a 31–14 record at the All-Star break. At mid-season, the team traded Lohaus, and J.R. Reid to the New York Knicks in exchange for Charles D. Smith, and second-year forward Monty Williams. The Spurs posted a 17-game winning streak in March, where they went undefeated posting a 16–0 record that month, which matched the 1971–72 Los Angeles Lakers' record. The Spurs won their second consecutive Midwest Division title with a 59–23 record, and earned the second seed in the Western Conference; the team qualified for the NBA playoffs for the seventh consecutive year.

David Robinson averaged 25.0 points, 12.2 rebounds, 1.4 steals and 3.3 blocks per game, and was named to the All-NBA First Team, and to the NBA All-Defensive Second Team. In addition, Sean Elliott averaged 20.0 points and 5.1 rebounds per game, and contributed 161 three-point field goals, while Vinny Del Negro provided the team with 14.5 points and 3.8 assists per game, Avery Johnson contributed 13.1 points, 9.6 assists and 1.5 steals per game, and Smith provided with 9.6 points and 6.3 rebounds per game in 32 games after the trade. Off the bench, sixth man and three-point specialist Chuck Person contributed 10.9 points and 5.2 rebounds per game, and led the Spurs with 190 three-point field goals, while Perdue averaged 5.2 points and 6.1 rebounds per game, and Doc Rivers provided with 4.0 points per game.

During the NBA All-Star weekend at the Alamodome in San Antonio, Robinson and Elliott were both selected for the 1996 NBA All-Star Game, as members of the Western Conference All-Star team; it was Elliott's second and final All-Star appearance. Robinson finished in second place in Most Valuable Player voting, behind Michael Jordan of the Chicago Bulls, and also finished in fourth place in Defensive Player of the Year voting; Del Negro finished tied in 14th place in Most Improved Player voting, Person finished in sixth place in Sixth Man of the Year voting, and head coach Bob Hill finished tied in third place in Coach of the Year voting.

The Spurs finished seventh in the NBA in home-game attendance, with an attendance of 782,701 at the Alamodome during the regular season.

=== NBA playoffs ===
In the Western Conference First Round of the 1996 NBA playoffs, the Spurs faced off against the 7th–seeded Phoenix Suns, a team that featured All-Star forward Charles Barkley, All-Star guard Kevin Johnson, and sixth man Danny Manning. The Spurs won the first two games over the Suns at home at the Alamodome, before losing Game 3 on the road, 94–93 at the America West Arena. The Spurs won Game 4 over the Suns on the road, 116–98 to win the series in four games.

In the Western Conference Semi-finals, the team faced off against the 3rd–seeded Utah Jazz, who were led by the trio of All-Star forward Karl Malone, All-Star guard John Stockton, and Jeff Hornacek. With the series tied at 1–1, the Spurs lost the next two games to the Jazz on the road, including a Game 4 loss at the Delta Center, 101–86. However, the Spurs managed to win Game 5 at the Alamodome, 98–87, but then lost Game 6 to the Jazz at the Delta Center, 108–81, thus losing the series in six games.

=== Notable highlights ===
One notable highlight of the regular season occurred on November 8, 1995, in which the Spurs defeated the expansion Vancouver Grizzlies, 111–62 at the Alamodome; Vancouver's 62 points were the fifth-lowest number of points scored in a game in NBA history at the time.

=== Aftermath ===
Following the season, Rivers retired to become a broadcast analyst for Turner Sports, ending his 13-year career in the NBA.

== Draft picks ==
Round	Pick	Player	Position	Nationality	College
1	29	Cory Alexander	PG	United States	Virginia

== Roster ==
1995–96 San Antonio Spurs roster
Players

Pos.	No.	Player	Height	Weight	DOB	From
G	1	Cory Alexander	6 ft 1 in (1.85 m)	185 lb (84 kg)	1973–06–22	Virginia
C	33	Greg Anderson	6 ft 10 in (2.08 m)	230 lb (104 kg)	1964–06–22	Houston
G	15	Vinny Del Negro	6 ft 4 in (1.93 m)	185 lb (84 kg)	1966–08–09	NC State
G	5	Dell Demps (injured)	6 ft 3 in (1.91 m)	205 lb (93 kg)	1970–02–12	Pacific
F	32	Sean Elliott	6 ft 8 in (2.03 m)	205 lb (93 kg)	1968–02–02	Arizona
F	7	Carl Herrera	6 ft 9 in (2.06 m)	215 lb (98 kg)	1966–12–14	Houston
G	6	Avery Johnson	5 ft 10 in (1.78 m)	175 lb (79 kg)	1965–03–25	Southern
C	41	Will Perdue	7 ft 0 in (2.13 m)	240 lb (109 kg)	1965–09–29	Vanderbilt
F	45	Chuck Person	6 ft 8 in (2.03 m)	220 lb (100 kg)	1964–06–27	Auburn
G	25	Doc Rivers	6 ft 4 in (1.93 m)	185 lb (84 kg)	1961–10–13	Marquette
C	50	David Robinson	7 ft 1 in (2.16 m)	235 lb (107 kg)	1965–08–06	Navy
F	54	Charles Smith	6 ft 10 in (2.08 m)	230 lb (104 kg)	1965–07–16	Pittsburgh
F	3	Monty Williams	6 ft 8 in (2.03 m)	225 lb (102 kg)	1971–10–08	Notre Dame

Coaches
Head coach
- Bob Hill
Assistant(s)
- Dave Cowens
- Hank Egan
- Paul Pressey

Legend
- (DP) Unsigned draft pick
- (FA) Free agent
- (S) Suspended
- Injured

Roster

== Regular season ==
=== Season standings ===
Midwest Division	W	L	PCT	GB	Home	Road	Div
y-San Antonio Spurs	59	23	.720	–	33–8	26–15	19–5
x-Utah Jazz	55	27	.671	4	34–7	21–20	14–10
x-Houston Rockets	48	34	.585	11	27–14	21–20	15–9
Denver Nuggets	35	47	.427	24	24–17	11–30	13–11
Minnesota Timberwolves	26	56	.317	33	17–24	9–32	10–14
Dallas Mavericks	26	56	.317	33	16–25	10–31	10–14
Vancouver Grizzlies	15	67	.183	44	10–31	5–36	3–21

Western Conference
#	Team	W	L	PCT	GB	GP
1	c-Seattle SuperSonics *	64	18	.780	–	82
2	y-San Antonio Spurs *	59	23	.720	5	82
3	x-Utah Jazz	55	27	.671	9	82
4	x-Los Angeles Lakers	53	29	.646	11	82
5	x-Houston Rockets	48	34	.585	16	82
6	x-Portland Trail Blazers	44	38	.537	20	82
7	x-Phoenix Suns	41	41	.500	23	82
8	x-Sacramento Kings	39	43	.476	25	82
9	Golden State Warriors	36	46	.439	28	82
10	Denver Nuggets	35	47	.427	29	82
11	Los Angeles Clippers	29	53	.354	35	82
12	Minnesota Timberwolves	26	56	.317	38	82
13	Dallas Mavericks	26	56	.317	38	82
14	Vancouver Grizzlies	15	67	.183	49	82

z – clinched division title
y – clinched division title
x – clinched playoff spot

== Playoffs ==
1996 playoff game log
First Round: 3–1 (home: 2–0; road: 1–1)

Game	Date	Team	Score	High points	High rebounds	High assists	Location Attendance	Series
1	April 26	Phoenix	W 120–98	Vinny Del Negro (29)	Will Perdue (9)	Avery Johnson (18)	Alamodome; 16,545	1–0
2	April 28	Phoenix	W 110–105	David Robinson (40)	David Robinson (21)	Avery Johnson (15)	Alamodome; 19,507	2–0
3	May 1	@ Phoenix	L 93–94	David Robinson (22)	Will Perdue (9)	Vinny Del Negro (8)	America West Arena; 19,023	2–1
4	May 3	@ Phoenix	W 116–98	David Robinson (30)	David Robinson (13)	Avery Johnson (13)	America West Arena; 19,023	3–1

Conference semifinals: 2–4 (home: 2–1; road: 0–3)

Game	Date	Team	Score	High points	High rebounds	High assists	Location Attendance	Series
1	May 7	Utah	L 75–95	David Robinson (29)	Will Perdue (7)	Avery Johnson (5)	Alamodome; 15,112	0–1
2	May 9	Utah	W 88–77	David Robinson (24)	David Robinson (12)	Avery Johnson (10)	Alamodome; 18,635	1–1
3	May 11	@ Utah	L 75–105	Sean Elliott (17)	David Robinson (9)	Avery Johnson (10)	Delta Center; 19,911	1–2
4	May 12	@ Utah	L 86–101	Sean Elliott (22)	Chuck Person (6)	Avery Johnson (8)	Delta Center; 19,911	1–3
5	May 14	Utah	W 98–87	David Robinson (24)	David Robinson (15)	Sean Elliott (8)	Alamodome; 34,215	2–3
6	May 16	@ Utah	L 81–108	Del Negro, Robinson (17)	David Robinson (8)	Avery Johnson (8)	Delta Center; 19,911	2–4

1996 schedule

== Player statistics ==
=== Ragular season ===
Player	POS	GP	GS	MP	REB	AST	STL	BLK	PTS	MPG	RPG	APG	SPG	BPG	PPG
Avery Johnson	PG	82	82	3,084	206	789	119	21	1,071	37.6	2.5	9.6	1.5	.3	13.1
David Robinson	C	82	82	3,019	1,000	247	111	271	2,051	36.8	12.2	3.0	1.4	3.3	25.0
Vinny Del Negro	SG	82	82	2,766	272	315	85	6	1,191	33.7	3.3	3.8	1.0	.1	14.5
Will Perdue	C	80	22	1,396	485	33	28	75	413	17.5	6.1	.4	.4	.9	5.2
Chuck Person	SF	80	16	2,131	413	100	49	26	873	26.6	5.2	1.3	.6	.3	10.9
Doc Rivers	PG	78	0	1,235	138	123	73	21	311	15.8	1.8	1.6	.9	.3	4.0
Sean Elliott	SF	77	77	2,901	396	211	69	33	1,537	37.7	5.1	2.7	.9	.4	20.0
Cory Alexander	PG	60	0	560	42	121	27	2	168	9.3	.7	2.0	.5	.0	2.8
Cadillac Anderson	PF	46	7	344	100	10	9	24	54	7.5	2.2	.2	.2	.5	1.2
Carl Herrera	PF	44	6	393	81	16	9	8	85	8.9	1.8	.4	.2	.2	1.9
Charles Smith^{†}	PF	32	30	826	202	36	32	29	306	25.8	6.3	1.1	1.0	.9	9.6
J. R. Reid^{†}	PF	32	5	643	123	14	25	10	208	20.1	3.8	.4	.8	.3	6.5
Brad Lohaus^{†}	PF	32	1	273	33	17	2	7	107	8.5	1.0	.5	.1	.2	3.3
Monty Williams^{†}	SF	17	0	122	23	4	4	2	49	7.2	1.4	.2	.2	.1	2.9
Dell Demps	SG	16	0	87	9	8	3	1	53	5.4	.6	.5	.2	.1	3.3

- ^{†} Denotes player spent time with another team in the season. Stats reflect time with the Spurs only.

=== Playoffs ===
Player	POS	GP	GS	MP	REB	AST	STL	BLK	PTS	MPG	RPG	APG	SPG	BPG	PPG
Avery Johnson	PG	10	10	407	36	94	20	1	123	40.7	3.6	9.4	2.0	.1	12.3
Sean Elliott	SF	10	10	389	39	25	11	4	155	38.9	3.9	2.5	1.1	.4	15.5
Vinny Del Negro	SG	10	10	379	26	29	13	3	143	37.9	2.6	2.9	1.3	.3	14.3
David Robinson	C	10	10	353	101	24	15	25	236	35.3	10.1	2.4	1.5	2.5	23.6
Charles Smith	PF	10	8	165	37	10	7	10	51	16.5	3.7	1.0	.7	1.0	5.1
Will Perdue	C	10	2	242	79	5	2	4	74	24.2	7.9	.5	.2	.4	7.4
Chuck Person	SF	10	0	284	40	16	2	3	121	28.4	4.0	1.6	.2	.3	12.1
Cory Alexander	PG	9	0	70	9	9	2	0	26	7.8	1.0	1.0	.2	.0	2.9
Monty Williams	SF	7	0	29	7	0	0	0	7	4.1	1.0	.0	.0	.0	1.0
Carl Herrera	PF	7	0	28	4	1	2	1	2	4.0	.6	.1	.3	.1	.3
Cadillac Anderson	PF	6	0	34	9	0	2	1	1	5.7	1.5	.0	.3	.2	.2
Doc Rivers	PG	2	0	20	1	0	0	0	3	10.0	.5	.0	.0	.0	1.5

== Awards and records ==
- David Robinson, NBA All-Star
- David Robinson, All-NBA First Team
- David Robinson, NBA All-Defensive First Team
- Sean Elliott, NBA All-Star

== See also ==
- 1995–96 NBA season
