= 1995–96 Los Angeles Clippers season =

NBA professional basketball team season

- Head coach: Bill Fitch
- Owners: Donald Sterling
- Arena: Los Angeles Memorial Sports Arena; Arrowhead Pond

Results
- Record: 29–53 (.354)
- Place: Division: 7th (Pacific); Conference: 11th (Western)
- Playoff finish: Did not qualify

Local media
- Television: KCOP-TV (Ralph Lawler, Bill Walton)
- Radio: KNNS (Rory Markas)

The 1995–96 Los Angeles Clippers season was the 26th season for the Los Angeles Clippers in the National Basketball Association, their twelfth season in Los Angeles, California, and their second season in which they played occasional home games in Anaheim, California.

== Season summary ==
=== Off-season ===
After finishing the previous season with a league-worst 17–65 record, the Clippers received the second overall pick in the 1995 NBA draft, and selected power forward Antonio McDyess from the University of Alabama; however, the team soon traded him to the Denver Nuggets in exchange for Brian Williams, Rodney Rogers, and rookie shooting guard, and first-round draft pick Brent Barry out of Oregon State University on draft day.

=== Regular season ===
With the addition of Rogers, Williams and Barry, the Clippers lost three of their first four games of the regular season, but then posted a five-game winning streak afterwards, and got off to a 7–5 start to the season. However, the team soon struggled and fell below .500 in winning percentage, posting a nine-game losing streak between November and December afterwards, and later on holding a 16–32 record at the All-Star break. The team posted another nine-game losing streak between January and February, as players such as Williams (strained left arch), Rogers (sprained ankle), Pooh Richardson (calf injury), Malik Sealy (knee and thumb injuries), and Stanley Roberts (ankle), were all out for long stretches during the season due to injuries. The Clippers lost eight of their final ten games of the season, and finished in last place in the Pacific Division with a 29–53 record.

Loy Vaught averaged 16.2 points and 10.1 rebounds per game, while Williams showed improvement, averaging 15.8 points and 7.6 rebounds per game, and sixth man Terry Dehere provided the team with 12.4 points and 4.3 assists per game, and also led them with 139 three-point field goals off the bench. In addition, Richardson contributed 11.7 points and 5.4 assists per game, while Rogers provided with 11.6 points per game, Sealy contributed 11.5 points and 1.4 steals per game, and Barry averaged 10.1 points per game and 123 three-point field goals, and was named to the NBA All-Rookie Second Team. Off the bench, second-year forward Lamond Murray contributed 8.4 points per game, while Roberts averaged 7.0 points and 3.2 rebounds per game, and Bo Outlaw provided with 3.6 points, 2.5 rebounds and 1.1 blocks per game, and shot .575 in field-goal percentage.

During the NBA All-Star weekend at the Alamodome in San Antonio, Texas, Barry won the NBA Slam Dunk Contest, and was also selected for the NBA Rookie Game, as a member of the Western Conference Rookie team. Williams finished tied in fifth place in Most Improved Player voting, while Outlaw finished tied in eighth place in Defensive Player of the Year voting. The Clippers finished last in the NBA in home-game attendance, with an attendance of 405,495 at the Los Angeles Memorial Sports Arena during the regular season, which was 29th in the league.

=== Aftermath ===
Following the season, Williams was released to free agency after only one season with the Clippers, due to the team not being able to agree to his high demanded asking price of a $101 million seven-year contract from the team, who offered him $12 million for three years. Williams spent most of the following season as a free agent before signing with the Chicago Bulls in next April, during the final month of the regular season.

== Draft picks ==
Round	Pick	Player	Position	Nationality	College
1	2	Antonio McDyess	PF	United States	Alabama
2	53	Constantin Popa	C	Romania	Miami (FL)

== Roster ==
1995–96 Los Angeles Clippers roster
Players

Pos.	No.	Player	Height	Weight	DOB	From
G	31	Brent Barry	6 ft 7 in (2.01 m)	210 lb (95 kg)	––	Oregon State
G	24	Terry Dehere	6 ft 2 in (1.88 m)	190 lb (86 kg)	––	Seton Hall
F/C	40	Antonio Harvey	6 ft 11 in (2.11 m)	250 lb (113 kg)	––	Pfeiffer
F	7	Lamond Murray	6 ft 7 in (2.01 m)	236 lb (107 kg)	––	California
F	45	Bo Outlaw	6 ft 8 in (2.03 m)	210 lb (95 kg)	––	Houston
G	52	Eric Piatkowski	6 ft 7 in (2.01 m)	215 lb (98 kg)	––	Nebraska
G	2	Pooh Richardson	6 ft 1 in (1.85 m)	180 lb (82 kg)	––	UCLA
C	53	Stanley Roberts	7 ft 0 in (2.13 m)	285 lb (129 kg)	––	LSU
F	54	Rodney Rogers	6 ft 7 in (2.01 m)	260 lb (118 kg)	––	Wake Forest
G/F	21	Malik Sealy	6 ft 8 in (2.03 m)	190 lb (86 kg)	––	St. John's
C	51	Keith Tower	6 ft 11 in (2.11 m)	250 lb (113 kg)	––	Notre Dame
F	25	Logan Vander Velden	6 ft 8 in (2.03 m)	215 lb (98 kg)	––	Green Bay
F	35	Loy Vaught	6 ft 9 in (2.06 m)	230 lb (104 kg)	––	Michigan
C	8	Brian Williams	6 ft 11 in (2.11 m)	260 lb (118 kg)	––	Arizona

Coaches
Head coach
- Bill Fitch
Assistant(s)
- Jim Brewer
- Barry Hecker
- Bob Ociepka

Legend
- (DP) Unsigned draft pick
- (FA) Free agent
- (S) Suspended
- Injured

Roster
Updated: 2009-10-04

=== Roster Notes ===
- Forward/center Antonio Harvey became the 6th former Laker to play with the crosstown rival Clippers; he was signed by the team on January 3, 1996, after being released by the expansion Vancouver Grizzlies.

== Regular season ==
=== Season standings ===
Pacific Division	W	L	PCT	GB	Home	Road	Div
c-Seattle SuperSonics	64	18	.780	–	38–3	26–15	21–3
x-Los Angeles Lakers	53	29	.646	11	30–11	23–18	17–7
x-Portland Trail Blazers	44	38	.537	20	26–15	18–23	11–13
x-Phoenix Suns	41	41	.500	23	25–16	16–25	9–15
x-Sacramento Kings	39	43	.476	25	26–15	13–28	11–13
Golden State Warriors	36	46	.439	28	23–18	13–28	7–17
Los Angeles Clippers	29	53	.354	35	19–22	10–31	7–17

Western Conference
#	Team	W	L	PCT	GB	GP
1	c-Seattle SuperSonics *	64	18	.780	–	82
2	y-San Antonio Spurs *	59	23	.720	5	82
3	x-Utah Jazz	55	27	.671	9	82
4	x-Los Angeles Lakers	53	29	.646	11	82
5	x-Houston Rockets	48	34	.585	16	82
6	x-Portland Trail Blazers	44	38	.537	20	82
7	x-Phoenix Suns	41	41	.500	23	82
8	x-Sacramento Kings	39	43	.476	25	82
9	Golden State Warriors	36	46	.439	28	82
10	Denver Nuggets	35	47	.427	29	82
11	Los Angeles Clippers	29	53	.354	35	82
12	Minnesota Timberwolves	26	56	.317	38	82
13	Dallas Mavericks	26	56	.317	38	82
14	Vancouver Grizzlies	15	67	.183	49	82

z - clinched division title
y - clinched division title
x - clinched playoff spot

== Player statistics ==
Legend
GP	Games played	GS	Games started	MPG	Minutes per game
FG%	Field-goal percentage	3P%	3-point field-goal percentage	FT%	Free-throw percentage
RPG	Rebounds per game	APG	Assists per game	SPG	Steals per game
BPG	Blocks per game	PPG	Points per game

Player	GP	GS	MPG	FG%	3P%	FT%	RPG	APG	SPG	BPG	PPG
Loy Vaught	80	78	37.1	52.5	36.8	72.7	10.1	1.4	1.1	0.5	16.2
Bison Dele	65	65	33.2	54.3	16.7	73.4	7.6	1.9	1.1	0.8	15.8
Terry Dehere	82	10	24.6	45.9	44.0	75.5	1.7	4.3	0.7	0.2	12.4
Pooh Richardson	63	61	32.0	42.3	38.4	74.3	2.5	5.4	1.2	0.2	11.7
Rodney Rogers	67	51	29.1	47.7	32.0	62.8	4.3	2.5	1.1	0.5	11.6
Malik Sealy	62	48	25.8	41.5	21.0	79.9	3.9	1.9	1.4	0.5	11.5
Brent Barry	79	44	24.0	47.4	41.6	81.0	2.1	2.9	1.2	0.3	10.1
Lamond Murray	77	32	23.6	44.7	31.9	75.0	3.2	1.1	0.8	0.3	8.4
Stanley Roberts	51	7	15.6	46.4	0.0	55.6	3.2	0.8	0.3	0.8	7.0
Eric Piatkowski	65	1	12.1	40.5	33.3	81.7	1.6	0.7	0.4	0.2	4.6
Bo Outlaw	80	3	12.3	57.5	0.0	44.4	2.5	0.6	0.6	1.1	3.6
Antonio Harvey	37	9	11.1	34.1	0.0	45.0	2.9	0.2	0.4	0.7	2.9
Keith Tower	34	1	9.0	44.4	0.0	69.2	1.5	0.1	0.1	0.3	2.4
Logan Vander Velden	15	0	2.1	21.4	0.0	75.0	0.4	0.1	0.0	0.0	0.6

Player statistics citation:

== Awards, records and milestones ==
=== Awards ===
- Forward/guard Brent Barry won the NBA Slam Dunk Contest. He is the first Clipper to participate in and win the contest.

==== All-Star ====
- Aside from NBA Slam Dunk Contest, Brent Barry also played in The Rookie Game on the Western Conference Rookies team during NBA All Star Weekend.

=== Milestones ===
- Brent Barry is the only caucasian to win the NBA Slam Dunk Contest.

== Transactions ==
The Clippers have been involved in the following transactions during the 1995–96 season.

=== Re-signed ===
Player	Signed	Contract
Bo Outlaw	October 4, 1995	Two-year deal

=== Trades ===
June 28, 1995
September 19, 1995
To Los Angeles Clippers

- Rodney Rogers & draft rights to Brent Barry
To Los Angeles Clippers

- Brian Williams
To Denver Nuggets

- Randy Woods & draft rights to Antonio McDyess
To Denver Nuggets

- Elmore Spencer

=== Free agents ===
==== Additions ====
Player	Signed	Former team
Logan Vander Velden	October 1	Memphis Fire (USBL)
Keith Tower	October 4	Orlando Magic
Antonio Harvey	January 3	Vancouver Grizzlies

==== Subtractions ====
Player	Left	New team
Tony Massenburg	expansion draft, June 24	Toronto Raptors
Michael Smith	released, September 19	Gijón Baloncesto (Liga ACB)
Harold Ellis	renounced, September 19	Aris BC (GBL)
Gary Grant	renounced, September 29	New York Knicks
Eric Riley	free agency, October 14	Minnesota Timberwolves
Logan Vander Velden	waived, January 4	Connecticut Pride (CBA)

Player transactions citation:

== See also ==
- 1995-96 NBA season
