= 1995–96 Utah Jazz season =

NBA professional basketball team season

- Head coach: Jerry Sloan
- General manager: Tim Howells
- Owner: Larry H. Miller
- Arena: Delta Center

Results
- Record: 55–27 (.671)
- Place: Division: 2nd (Midwest); Conference: 3rd (Western)
- Playoff finish: Western Conference finals (lost to SuperSonics 3–4)
- Stats at Basketball Reference

Local media
- Television: KJZZ-TV; Prime Sports Intermountain West
- Radio: KCNR

The 1995–96 Utah Jazz season was the 22nd season for the Utah Jazz in the National Basketball Association, and their 17th season in Salt Lake City, Utah.

== Season summary ==
=== Off-season ===
The Jazz had the 28th overall pick in the 1995 NBA draft, and selected center Greg Ostertag from the University of Kansas. During the off-season, the team signed free agents Chris Morris, Greg Foster, and second-year guard Howard Eisley. The team also released James Donaldson, who was out due to a strained hamstring, to free agency in December.

=== Regular season ===
With the addition of Morris, the Jazz got off to a fast start by winning ten of their first twelve games of the regular season, and later on held a 32–16 record at the All-Star break. The team posted a seven-game winning streak between February and March, and posted a six-game winning streak in March, but lost seven of their final twelve games of the season. The Jazz finished in second place in the Midwest Division with a 55–27 record, and earned the third seed in the Western Conference; the team qualified for the NBA playoffs for the 13th consecutive year.

Karl Malone averaged 25.7 points, 9.8 rebounds, 4.2 assists and 1.7 steals per game, and was named to the All-NBA First Team, while Jeff Hornacek averaged 15.2 points, 4.1 assists and 1.3 steals per game, and led the Jazz with 104 three-point field goals, and John Stockton provided the team with 14.7 points, 11.2 assists and 1.7 steals per game, and was named to the All-NBA Second Team. In addition, Morris contributed 10.5 points per game, while David Benoit provided with 8.2 points and 4.7 rebounds per game. Off the bench, Antoine Carr contributed 7.3 points per game, while Adam Keefe provided with 6.1 points and 5.5 rebounds per game, starting center Felton Spencer averaged 5.6 points and 4.3 rebounds per game, and Eisley contributed 4.4 points per game.

During the NBA All-Star weekend at the Alamodome in San Antonio, Texas, Malone and Stockton were both selected for the 1996 NBA All-Star Game, as members of the Western Conference All-Star team. Stockton had another record-breaking season, leading the NBA in assists for the ninth consecutive season, while breaking Maurice Cheeks career record in steals, and Malone moved into ninth place in all-time scoring. Malone also finished in seventh place in Most Valuable Player voting.

The Jazz finished fifth in the NBA in home-game attendance, with an attendance of 813,073 at the Delta Center during the regular season.

=== NBA playoffs ===
In the Western Conference First Round of the 1996 NBA playoffs, the Jazz faced off against the 6th–seeded Portland Trail Blazers, a team that featured Clifford Robinson, Rod Strickland, and rookie center Arvydas Sabonis. The Jazz won the first two games over the Trail Blazers at home at the Delta Center, but then lost the next two games on the road, which included a Game 4 loss to the Trail Blazers at the Rose Garden Arena, 98–90. With the series tied at 2–2, the Jazz won Game 5 over the Trail Blazers by a 38-point margin, 102–64 at the Delta Center, thus winning in a hard-fought five-game series.

In the Western Conference Semi-finals, the team faced off against the 2nd–seeded, and Midwest Division champion San Antonio Spurs, who were led by All-Star center David Robinson, All-Star forward Sean Elliott, and Avery Johnson. With the series tied at 1–1, the Jazz won the next two games over the Spurs at the Delta Center, including a Game 4 win by a score of 101–86. After losing Game 5 on the road, 98–87 at the Alamodome, the Jazz won Game 6 over the Spurs at the Delta Center, 108–81 to win the series in six games.

In the Western Conference Finals for the third time in five years, the Jazz then faced off against the top–seeded, and Pacific Division champion Seattle SuperSonics, who were led by the All-Star trio of Shawn Kemp, Defensive Player of the Year, Gary Payton, and Detlef Schrempf. The SuperSonics took a 3–1 series lead, but the Jazz managed to win the next two games, including a Game 6 home win at the Delta Center, 118–83 to even the series. However, the Jazz lost Game 7 to the SuperSonics on the road, 90–86 at the KeyArena at Seattle Center, thus losing in a hard-fought seven-game series.

The SuperSonics would advance to the 1996 NBA Finals, but would lose in six games to the Michael Jordan-led Chicago Bulls.

=== Aftermath ===
Following the season, Benoit signed as a free agent with the New Jersey Nets, and Spencer was traded to the Orlando Magic.

== Draft picks ==
Round	Pick	Player	Position	Nationality	College
1	28	Greg Ostertag	C	United States	Kansas

== Roster ==
1995–96 Utah Jazz roster
Players

Pos.	No.	Player	Height	Weight	DOB	From
F	21	David Benoit	6 ft 8 in (2.03 m)	220 lb (100 kg)	1968–05–09	Alabama
F	55	Antoine Carr	6 ft 9 in (2.06 m)	225 lb (102 kg)	1961–07–23	Wichita State
G	10	Howard Eisley	6 ft 2 in (1.88 m)	177 lb (80 kg)	1972–12–04	Boston College
C	44	Greg Foster	6 ft 11 in (2.11 m)	240 lb (109 kg)	1968–10–03	UTEP
G	14	Jeff Hornacek	6 ft 3 in (1.91 m)	190 lb (86 kg)	1963–05–03	Iowa State
F	31	Adam Keefe	6 ft 9 in (2.06 m)	230 lb (104 kg)	1970–02–22	Stanford
F	32	Karl Malone	6 ft 9 in (2.06 m)	250 lb (113 kg)	1963–07–24	Louisiana Tech
F	43	Chris Morris	6 ft 8 in (2.03 m)	210 lb (95 kg)	1966–01–20	Auburn
C	00	Greg Ostertag	7 ft 2 in (2.18 m)	280 lb (127 kg)	1973–03–06	Kansas
F	34	Bryon Russell	6 ft 7 in (2.01 m)	225 lb (102 kg)	1970–12–31	Long Beach State
C	50	Felton Spencer	7 ft 0 in (2.13 m)	265 lb (120 kg)	1968–01–15	Louisville
G	12	John Stockton	6 ft 1 in (1.85 m)	170 lb (77 kg)	1962–03–26	Gonzaga
F	5	Andy Toolson	6 ft 6 in (1.98 m)	210 lb (95 kg)	1966–01–19	BYU
F	15	Jamie Watson	6 ft 7 in (2.01 m)	190 lb (86 kg)	1972–02–23	South Carolina

Coaches
Head coach
- Jerry Sloan
Assistant(s)
- Gordon Chiesa
- David Fredman
- Phil Johnson

Legend
- (DP) Unsigned draft pick
- (FA) Free agent
- (S) Suspended
- Injured

Roster
Updated: January 23, 1996

=== Roster Notes ===
- Center James Donaldson was waived on December 4, 1995.

== Regular season ==
=== Season standings ===
Midwest Division	W	L	PCT	GB	Home	Road	Div
y-San Antonio Spurs	59	23	.720	–	33–8	26–15	19–5
x-Utah Jazz	55	27	.671	4	34–7	21–20	14–10
x-Houston Rockets	48	34	.585	11	27–14	21–20	15–9
Denver Nuggets	35	47	.427	24	24–17	11–30	13–11
Minnesota Timberwolves	26	56	.317	33	17–24	9–32	10–14
Dallas Mavericks	26	56	.317	33	16–25	10–31	10–14
Vancouver Grizzlies	15	67	.183	44	10–31	5–36	3–21

Western Conference
#	Team	W	L	PCT	GB	GP
1	c-Seattle SuperSonics *	64	18	.780	–	82
2	y-San Antonio Spurs *	59	23	.720	5	82
3	x-Utah Jazz	55	27	.671	9	82
4	x-Los Angeles Lakers	53	29	.646	11	82
5	x-Houston Rockets	48	34	.585	16	82
6	x-Portland Trail Blazers	44	38	.537	20	82
7	x-Phoenix Suns	41	41	.500	23	82
8	x-Sacramento Kings	39	43	.476	25	82
9	Golden State Warriors	36	46	.439	28	82
10	Denver Nuggets	35	47	.427	29	82
11	Los Angeles Clippers	29	53	.354	35	82
12	Minnesota Timberwolves	26	56	.317	38	82
13	Dallas Mavericks	26	56	.317	38	82
14	Vancouver Grizzlies	15	67	.183	49	82

== Game log ==
=== Regular season ===
1995–96 game log
Total: 55–27 (home: 34–7; road: 21–20)
November: 12–4 (home: 6–1; road: 6–3)

Game	Date	Team	Score	High points	High rebounds	High assists	Location Attendance	Record
1	November 3	Seattle	W 112–94				Delta Center	1–0
3	November 6	Atlanta	W 105–96				Delta Center	2–1
6	November 12	@ New York	L 110–120				Madison Square Garden	4–2
13	November 24	Chicago	L 85–90				Delta Center	10–3
16	November 30	@ Houston	W 112–105				The Summit	12–4

December: 8–5 (home: 5–2; road: 3–3)

Game	Date	Team	Score	High points	High rebounds	High assists	Location Attendance	Record
17	December 5	Houston	L 100–103				Delta Center	12–5
21	December 15	@ Orlando	L 99–111				Orlando Arena	14–7
26	December 23	@ Chicago	L 86–100				United Center	17–9

January: 9–5 (home: 5–1; road: 4–4)

Game	Date	Team	Score	High points	High rebounds	High assists	Location Attendance	Record
31	January 3	@ San Antonio	L 97–111				Alamodome	21–10
34	January 12	San Antonio	L 94–101				Delta Center	22–12
35	January 15	@ Houston	L 99–107				The Summit	22–13
36	January 19	Orlando	W 111–99				Delta Center	23–13
40	January 26	@ Seattle	L 93–94				KeyArena	26–14

February: 9–3 (home: 7–0; road: 2–3)

Game	Date	Team	Score	High points	High rebounds	High assists	Location Attendance	Record
All-Star Break
49	February 13	@ San Antonio	W 114–111 (OT)				Alamodome	33–16

March: 12–4 (home: 8–0; road: 4–4)

Game	Date	Team	Score	High points	High rebounds	High assists	Location Attendance	Record
56	March 1	New York	W 99–88				Delta Center	39–17
59	March 8	Houston	W 109–89				Delta Center	42–17
61	March 12	@ Atlanta	L 89–115				The Omni	43–18
71	March 30	@ Seattle	L 98–100				KeyArena	50–21

April: 5–6 (home: 3–3; road: 2–3)

Game	Date	Team	Score	High points	High rebounds	High assists	Location Attendance	Record
72	April 2	Seattle	L 91–100				Delta Center	50–22
76	April 8	San Antonio	L 91–92				Delta Center	51–25

1995–96 schedule

== Playoffs ==
1996 playoff game log
First Round: 3–2 (home: 3–0; road: 0–2)

Game	Date	Team	Score	High points	High rebounds	High assists	Location Attendance	Series
1	April 25	Portland	W 110–102	Karl Malone (33)	Karl Malone (9)	John Stockton (23)	Delta Center; 19,614	1–0
2	April 27	Portland	W 105–90	Karl Malone (30)	Karl Malone (14)	John Stockton (16)	Delta Center; 19,911	2–0
3	April 29	@ Portland	L 91–94 (OT)	Karl Malone (35)	David Benoit (11)	John Stockton (11)	Rose Garden; 21,401	2–1
4	May 1	@ Portland	L 90–98	Jeff Hornacek (30)	Malone, Morris (6)	John Stockton (11)	Rose Garden; 21,401	2–2
5	May 5	Portland	W 102–64	Karl Malone (25)	Karl Malone (10)	John Stockton (11)	Delta Center; 19,682	3–2

Western Conference Semifinals: 4–2 (home: 3–0; road: 1–2)

Game	Date	Team	Score	High points	High rebounds	High assists	Location Attendance	Series
1	May 7	@ San Antonio	W 95–75	Karl Malone (23)	Karl Malone (7)	John Stockton (19)	Alamodome; 15,112	1–0
2	May 9	@ San Antonio	L 77–88	Karl Malone (24)	Malone, Ostertag (8)	John Stockton (13)	Alamodome; 18,635	1–1
3	May 11	San Antonio	W 105–75	Karl Malone (32)	Karl Malone (11)	John Stockton (7)	Delta Center; 19,911	2–1
4	May 12	San Antonio	W 101–86	Chris Morris (25)	Adam Keefe (7)	John Stockton (10)	Delta Center; 19,911	3–1
5	May 14	@ San Antonio	L 87–98	Karl Malone (24)	Karl Malone (12)	John Stockton (8)	Alamodome; 34,215	3–2
6	May 16	San Antonio	W 108–81	Karl Malone (25)	Karl Malone (13)	John Stockton (13)	Delta Center; 19,911	4–2

Western Conference Finals: 3–4 (home: 2–1; road: 1–3)

Game	Date	Team	Score	High points	High rebounds	High assists	Location Attendance	Series
1	May 18	@ Seattle	L 72–102	Karl Malone (21)	Karl Malone (8)	John Stockton (7)	KeyArena; 17,072	0–1
2	May 20	@ Seattle	L 87–91	Karl Malone (32)	Karl Malone (13)	John Stockton (7)	KeyArena; 17,072	0–2
3	May 24	Seattle	W 96–76	Malone, Hornacek (28)	Karl Malone (18)	Jeff Hornacek (8)	Delta Center; 19,911	1–2
4	May 26	Seattle	L 86–88	Karl Malone (25)	Karl Malone (12)	Malone, Stockton (8)	Delta Center; 19,911	1–3
5	May 28	@ Seattle	W 98–95 (OT)	Karl Malone (29)	Karl Malone (15)	John Stockton (6)	KeyArena; 17,072	2–3
6	May 30	Seattle	W 118–83	Karl Malone (32)	Karl Malone (10)	John Stockton (12)	Delta Center; 19,911	3–3
7	June 2	@ Seattle	L 86–90	Malone, Stockton (22)	John Stockton (8)	Malone, Stockton (7)	KeyArena; 17,072	3–4

1996 schedule

== Player statistics ==
Legend
GP	Games played	GS	Games started	MPG	Minutes per game
FG%	Field-goal percentage	3P%	3-point field-goal percentage	FT%	Free-throw percentage
RPG	Rebounds per game	APG	Assists per game	SPG	Steals per game
BPG	Blocks per game	PPG	Points per game

=== Season ===
Player	GP	GS	MPG	FG%	3FG%	FT%	RPG	APG	SPG	BPG	PPG
David Benoit	81	63	24.2	.439	.333	.777	4.7	1.0	0.5	0.6	8.2
Antoine Carr	80	0	19.2	.457	.000	.792	2.5	0.9	0.4	0.8	7.3
Howard Eisley	65	0	14.8	.430	.226	.844	1.2	2.2	0.4	0.0	4.4
Greg Foster	73	2	11.0	.439	.125	.847	2.4	0.3	0.1	0.3	3.8
Jeff Hornacek	82	59	31.6	.502	.466	.893	2.5	4.1	1.3	0.2	15.2
Adam Keefe	82	0	20.8	.520	.000	.692	5.5	0.8	0.6	0.5	6.1
Karl Malone	82	82	38.0	.519	.400	.723	9.8	4.2	1.7	0.7	25.7
Chris Morris	66	33	21.6	.437	.320	.772	3.5	1.2	1.0	0.3	10.5
Greg Ostertag	57	10	11.6	.473		.667	3.1	0.1	0.1	1.1	3.6
Bryon Russell	59	9	9.8	.394	.350	.716	1.5	0.5	0.5	0.1	2.9
Felton Spencer	71	70	17.8	.520		.689	4.3	0.2	0.3	0.8	5.6
John Stockton	82	82	35.5	.538	.422	.830	2.8	11.2	1.7	0.2	14.7
Andy Toolson	13	0	4.1	.364	.250	.750	0.5	0.1	0.0	0.0	1.7
Jamie Watson	16	0	13.6	.419	.429	.692	1.7	1.5	0.5	0.1	3.0

=== Playoffs ===
Player	GP	GS	MPG	FG%	3FG%	FT%	RPG	APG	SPG	BPG	PPG
David Benoit	14	5	18.5	.471	.500	.778	2.6	0.5	0.1	0.2	6.2
Antoine Carr	18	0	18.8	.474		.680	1.9	1.2	0.2	0.8	6.1
Howard Eisley	18	0	11.2	.381	.333	.818	1.2	2.4	0.2	0.1	2.9
Greg Foster	12	0	6.3	.500		.600	1.0	0.2	0.1	0.2	2.3
Jeff Hornacek	18	18	35.8	.502	.586	.890	3.6	3.3	1.1	0.2	17.5
Adam Keefe	17	0	10.5	.676	.500	.647	1.9	0.1	0.2	0.1	3.4
Karl Malone	18	18	40.3	.469	.000	.574	10.3	4.4	1.9	0.6	26.5
Chris Morris	18	13	17.8	.425	.270	.750	3.9	1.1	0.7	0.4	6.2
Greg Ostertag	15	0	14.1	.444		.619	3.3	0.1	0.1	1.4	3.5
Bryon Russell	18	0	25.5	.468	.472	.816	4.2	1.2	1.3	0.5	9.6
Felton Spencer	18	18	15.3	.434	.000	.556	3.0	0.1	0.3	1.2	2.8
John Stockton	18	18	37.7	.446	.289	.814	3.2	10.8	1.6	0.4	11.1

Player statistics citation:

== Awards and records ==
- Karl Malone, All-NBA First Team
- John Stockton, All-NBA Second Team

== Transactions ==
=== Free agents ===
Subtractions
Player	Date signed	New team
Blue Edwards	Expansion Draft June 24, 1995	Vancouver Grizzlies
