= 1995–96 Golden State Warriors season =

NBA professional basketball team season

- Head coach: Rick Adelman
- Owners: Chris Cohan
- Arena: Oakland-Alameda County Coliseum Arena

Results
- Record: 36–46 (.439)
- Place: Division: 6th (Pacific); Conference: 9th (Western)
- Playoff finish: Did not qualify
- Stats at Basketball Reference

Local media
- Television: KPIX-TV; KICU-TV; SportsChannel Pacific
- Radio: KNBR

The 1995–96 Golden State Warriors season was the 50th season for the Golden State Warriors in the National Basketball Association, and their 34th season in the San Francisco Bay Area.

== Season summary ==
=== Off-season ===
The Warriors won the NBA draft lottery, and selected power forward Joe Smith from the University of Maryland with the first overall pick in the 1995 NBA draft. During the off-season, the team acquired B. J. Armstrong from the expansion Toronto Raptors, signed free agents Jerome Kersey, and Jon Barry, and hired Rick Adelman as their new head coach; Adelman had led the Portland Trail Blazers to two NBA Finals appearances between 1990 and 1992.

=== Regular season ===
Under Adelman and with the addition of Smith, Armstrong and Kersey, the Warriors struggled losing eight of their first eleven games of the regular season. However, the team later on won 8 of their 13 games in February, and held a 21–26 record at the All-Star break. With Armstrong and Kersey both in the starting lineup at point guard, and small forward respectively, Tim Hardaway and Chris Mullin both played off the bench for most of the season. At mid-season, the Warriors traded Hardaway, and Chris Gatling to the Miami Heat in exchange for Kevin Willis, and Bimbo Coles. The Warriors were in playoff position with a 26–28 record as of February 24, 1996, but then lost 18 of their final 28 games of the season, finishing in sixth place in the Pacific Division with a 36–46 record, which was a 10-game improvement over the previous season; however, the team failed to qualify for the NBA playoffs by finishing three games behind the 8th–seeded Sacramento Kings.

Latrell Sprewell averaged 18.9 points, 4.2 assists and 1.6 steals per game, while Smith averaged 15.3 points, 8.7 rebounds and 1.6 blocks per game, and was named to the NBA All-Rookie First Team, and Mullin provided the team with 13.3 points, 3.5 assists and 1.4 steals per game, but only played 55 games due to a finger injury. In addition, Armstrong contributed 12.3 points and 4.9 assists per game, and shot .473 in three-point field-goal percentage, while Rony Seikaly provided with 12.1 points and 7.8 rebounds per game, and Willis averaged 11.3 points and 7.8 rebounds per game in 28 games after the trade. Meanwhile, Coles contributed 7.9 points and 4.3 assists per game in 29 games, Kersey provided with 6.7 points, 4.8 rebounds and 1.2 steals per game, and second-year forward Donyell Marshall averaged 5.5 points and 3.4 rebounds per game.

During the NBA All-Star weekend at the Alamodome in San Antonio, Texas, Smith was selected for the NBA Rookie Game, as a member of the Western Conference Rookie team. Smith scored 20 points along with 6 rebounds and 2 blocks, despite the Western Conference losing to the Eastern Conference, 94–92. Sprewell finished tied in eighth place in Defensive Player of the Year voting, while Smith finished in third place in Rookie of the Year voting.

The Warriors finished 24th in the NBA in home-game attendance, with an attendance of 616,025 at the Oakland-Alameda County Coliseum Arena during the regular season.

=== Aftermath ===
Following the season, Willis signed as a free agent with the Houston Rockets, while Kersey signed with the Los Angeles Lakers, and Barry signed with the Atlanta Hawks.

== Offseason ==
=== Draft picks ===
Round	Pick	Player	Position	Nationality	College
1	1	Joe Smith	PF	United States	Maryland
2	34	Andrew DeClercq	C	United States	Florida
2	40	Dwayne Whitfield	PF	United States	Jackson State
2	50	Martin Lewis	SG/SF	United States	Seward Community College
2	55	Michael McDonald	C	United States	New Orleans

== Roster ==
1995–96 Golden State Warriors roster
Players

Pos.	No.	Player	Height	Weight	DOB	From
G	11	B. J. Armstrong	6 ft 2 in (1.88 m)	175 lb (79 kg)	1967–09–09	Iowa
G	20	Jon Barry	6 ft 4 in (1.93 m)	195 lb (88 kg)	1969–07–25	Georgia Tech
G	21	Robert Churchwell	6 ft 6 in (1.98 m)	195 lb (88 kg)	1972–02–20	Georgetown
G	12	Bimbo Coles	6 ft 1 in (1.85 m)	180 lb (82 kg)	1968–04–22	Virginia Tech
C	55	Andrew DeClercq	6 ft 10 in (2.08 m)	230 lb (104 kg)	1973–02–01	Florida
C	43	Geert Hammink	7 ft 0 in (2.13 m)	262 lb (119 kg)	1969–07–12	LSU
F	7	Jerome Kersey	6 ft 7 in (2.01 m)	215 lb (98 kg)	1962–06–26	Longwood
F	3	Donyell Marshall	6 ft 9 in (2.06 m)	218 lb (99 kg)	1973–05–18	Connecticut
F	17	Chris Mullin	6 ft 6 in (1.98 m)	200 lb (91 kg)	1963–07–30	St. John's
C	44	Clifford Rozier	6 ft 11 in (2.11 m)	245 lb (111 kg)	1972–10–31	Louisville
C	4	Rony Seikaly	6 ft 11 in (2.11 m)	230 lb (104 kg)	1965–05–10	Syracuse
F	32	Joe Smith	6 ft 10 in (2.08 m)	225 lb (102 kg)	1975–07–26	Maryland
G	15	Latrell Sprewell	6 ft 5 in (1.96 m)	190 lb (86 kg)	1970–09–08	Alabama
F	41	Kevin Willis	7 ft 0 in (2.13 m)	220 lb (100 kg)	1962–09–06	Michigan State

Coaches
Head coach
- Rick Adelman
Assistant(s)
- George Irvine
- Rod Higgins
- John Wetzel

Legend
- (DP) Unsigned draft pick
- (FA) Free agent
- (S) Suspended
- Injured

Roster

== Regular season ==
=== Season standings ===
Pacific Division	W	L	PCT	GB	Home	Road	Div
c-Seattle SuperSonics	64	18	.780	–	38–3	26–15	21–3
x-Los Angeles Lakers	53	29	.646	11	30–11	23–18	17–7
x-Portland Trail Blazers	44	38	.537	20	26–15	18–23	11–13
x-Phoenix Suns	41	41	.500	23	25–16	16–25	9–15
x-Sacramento Kings	39	43	.476	25	26–15	13–28	11–13
Golden State Warriors	36	46	.439	28	23–18	13–28	7–17
Los Angeles Clippers	29	53	.354	35	19–22	10–31	7–17

Western Conference
#	Team	W	L	PCT	GB	GP
1	c-Seattle SuperSonics *	64	18	.780	–	82
2	y-San Antonio Spurs *	59	23	.720	5	82
3	x-Utah Jazz	55	27	.671	9	82
4	x-Los Angeles Lakers	53	29	.646	11	82
5	x-Houston Rockets	48	34	.585	16	82
6	x-Portland Trail Blazers	44	38	.537	20	82
7	x-Phoenix Suns	41	41	.500	23	82
8	x-Sacramento Kings	39	43	.476	25	82
9	Golden State Warriors	36	46	.439	28	82
10	Denver Nuggets	35	47	.427	29	82
11	Los Angeles Clippers	29	53	.354	35	82
12	Minnesota Timberwolves	26	56	.317	38	82
13	Dallas Mavericks	26	56	.317	38	82
14	Vancouver Grizzlies	15	67	.183	49	82

z - clinched division title
y - clinched division title
x - clinched playoff spot

== Player statistics ==
Legend
GP	Games played	GS	Games started	MPG	Minutes per game
FG%	Field-goal percentage	3P%	3-point field-goal percentage	FT%	Free-throw percentage
RPG	Rebounds per game	APG	Assists per game	SPG	Steals per game
BPG	Blocks per game	PPG	Points per game

=== Regular season ===
Player	GP	GS	MPG	FG%	3P%	FT%	RPG	APG	SPG	BPG	PPG
Joe Smith	82	82	34.4	.458	.357	.773	8.7	1.0	1.0	1.6	15.3
B. J. Armstrong	82	64	27.6	.468	.473	.839	2.2	4.9	.8	.1	12.3
Latrell Sprewell	78	78	39.3	.428	.323	.789	4.9	4.2	1.6	.6	18.9
Jerome Kersey	76	58	21.3	.410	.176	.660	4.8	1.5	1.2	.6	6.7
Jon Barry	68	0	10.5	.492	.473	.838	.9	1.3	.5	.2	3.8
Rony Seikaly	64	60	28.3	.502	.667	.723	7.8	1.1	.6	1.1	12.1
Donyell Marshall	62	6	15.1	.398	.298	.771	3.4	.8	.4	.5	5.5
Clifford Rozier	59	1	12.3	.585	.000	.473	2.9	.4	.3	.5	3.1
Chris Mullin	55	19	29.4	.499	.393	.856	2.9	3.5	1.4	.6	13.3
Tim Hardaway^{†}	52	18	28.6	.421	.366	.769	2.5	6.9	1.4	.2	14.1
Chris Gatling^{†}	47	2	18.3	.555	.000	.636	5.1	.6	.4	.6	9.1
Bimbo Coles^{†}	29	3	25.3	.399	.305	.763	2.0	4.3	1.1	.2	7.9
Kevin Willis^{†}	28	18	27.8	.433	.250	.701	7.8	.7	.5	.6	11.3
Andrew DeClercq	22	1	9.2	.480	.000	.579	1.8	.4	.3	.2	2.7
David Wood^{†}	21	0	4.6	.500	.333	.875	.8	.2	.1	.0	1.0
Robert Churchwell	4	0	5.0	.375			.8	.3	.0	.0	1.5
Geert Hammink^{†}	3	0	3.3	.500		.667	.3	.0	.0	.0	1.3

- ^{†} Denotes player spent time with another team in the season. Stats reflect time with the Warriors only.

Player statistics citation:

== Transactions ==
=== Trades ===
November 2, 1995	To Golden State Warriors B. J. Armstrong	To Toronto Raptors Victor Alexander; Martin Lewis; Michael McDonald; Carlos Rogers; Dwayne Whitfield

February 20, 1996	To Golden State Warriors Bimbo Coles; Kevin Willis	To Miami Heat Tim Hardaway; Chris Gatling

=== Free agents ===
Additions
Player	Date signed	Former team
Jon Barry	October 4	Milwaukee Bucks
Kevin Ollie	October 4	none
Matt Maloney	October 6	none
Jerome Kersey	October 18	Portland Trail Blazers
Robert Churchwell (10-day)	March 14	Chicago Rockers (CBA)
Geert Hammink (10-day)	March 25	Omaha Racers (CBA)
Robert Churchwell (rest of season)	April 3	Golden State Warriors
Geert Hammink (rest of season)	April 14	Golden State Warriors

Subtractions
Player	Date signed	New Team
Tim Legler	September 27	Washington Bullets
Ricky Pierce	October 3	Indiana Pacers
Kevin Ollie	October 11	Connecticut Pride (CBA)
Matt Maloney	November 1	Grand Rapids Mackers (CBA)
David Wood	January 15	Phoenix Suns

Player transactions citation:

== See also ==
- 1995-96 NBA season
