= 1995–96 Minnesota Timberwolves season =

NBA professional basketball team season

- Head coach: Bill Blair (fired); Flip Saunders (interim)
- General manager: Kevin McHale
- Owner: Glen Taylor
- Arena: Target Center

Results
- Record: 26–56 (.317)
- Place: Division: 5th (Midwest); Conference: 12th (Western)
- Playoff finish: Did not qualify
- Stats at Basketball Reference

Local media
- Television: KARE; KLGT; Midwest Sports Channel
- Radio: KFAN

The 1995–96 Minnesota Timberwolves season was the seventh season for the Minnesota Timberwolves in the National Basketball Association.

== Season summary ==
=== Off-season ===
This season was most memorable when the Timberwolves received the fifth overall pick in the 1995 NBA draft, and selected power forward, and high school basketball star Kevin Garnett. During the off-season, the team signed free agent All-Star guard Terry Porter, and re-signed former Timberwolves forward Sam Mitchell.

=== Regular season ===
Despite the addition of Garnett, Porter and Mitchell, the Timberwolves got off to a bad start by losing nine of their first ten games of the regular season. After a 6–14 start to the season, head coach Bill Blair was fired and replaced with Flip Saunders, while Michael Williams was out for the remainder of the season due to a left heel injury after only just nine games. At mid-season, the team traded Christian Laettner, and Sean Rooks to the Atlanta Hawks in exchange for Andrew Lang, and Spud Webb, and re-signed second-year guard Darrick Martin after a brief stint with the expansion Vancouver Grizzlies. After holding a 13–32 record at the All-Star break, the Timberwolves played around .500 in winning percentage by posting an 8–8 record in March. However, the team lost their final six games of the season, and finished in fifth place in the Midwest Division with a 26–56 record; the Timberwolves missed the NBA playoffs for the seventh consecutive year.

Isaiah Rider averaged 19.6 points per game and led the Timberwolves with 102 three-point field goals, while Tom Gugliotta averaged 16.2 points, 8.8 rebounds and 1.8 steals per game, and Mitchell provided the team with 10.8 points and 4.3 rebounds per game. In addition, Garnett provided with 10.4 points, 6.3 rebounds and 1.6 blocks per game, and was named to the NBA All-Rookie Second Team, while Porter contributed 9.4 points and 5.5 assists per game, and Webb averaged 9.4 points and 5.9 assists per game in 26 games after the trade. Meanwhile, Lang averaged 8.8 points, 6.1 rebounds and 2.1 blocks per game in 20 games, Martin provided with 7.3 points and 4.5 assists per game in 35 games, and Doug West contributed 6.4 points per game.

During the NBA All-Star weekend at the Alamodome in San Antonio, Texas, Garnett was selected for the NBA Rookie Game, as a member of the Western Conference Rookie team; he also finished in sixth place in Rookie of the Year voting. The Timberwolves finished 26th in the NBA in home-game attendance, with an attendance of 585,669 at the Target Center during the regular season, which was the fourth-lowest in the league.

=== Aftermath ===
Following the season, Rider, who dealt with off-the-court troubles, was traded to the Portland Trail Blazers, while Lang was traded to the Milwaukee Bucks, Martin signed as a free agent with the Los Angeles Clippers, and Webb was released to free agency.

== Offseason ==
=== NBA draft ===
Round	Pick	Player	Position	Nationality	College
1	5	Kevin Garnett	SF/PF	United States	
2	48	Mark Davis	SG/SF	United States	Texas Tech
2	49	Jerome Allen	PG	United States	Pennsylvania

=== Kevin Garnett ===
In Garnett's rookie season, the Timberwolves were in the midst of a transition phase; they replaced Bill Blair with Flip Saunders as head coach early in the season and made several trades. Garnett initially came off the bench in his rookie year, but moved into the starting lineup soon after Saunders became head coach.

In his rookie year, Garnett and fellow newcomer Tom Gugliotta carried the scoring load. Garnett averaged 10.4 points, 6.3 rebounds, 1.8 assists, and 1.6 blocks per game and was voted into the NBA All-Rookie Second Team.

Despite having some promising players, the Timberwolves suffered through their seventh consecutive sub-30 win season and failed to make the playoffs. At the time Garnett was the youngest NBA player in history at 19 years and 11 months of age.

== Roster ==
1995–96 Minnesota Timberwolves roster
Players

Pos.	No.	Player	Height	Weight	DOB	From
G	53	Jerome Allen	6 ft 4 in (1.93 m)	184 lb (83 kg)	––	Penn
F	33	Marques Bragg	6 ft 8 in (2.03 m)	230 lb (104 kg)	––	Providence
F	7	Mark Davis	6 ft 7 in (2.01 m)	210 lb (95 kg)	––	Texas Tech
F	21	Kevin Garnett	6 ft 11 in (2.11 m)	220 lb (100 kg)	––	Farragut Academy (IL)
F	24	Tom Gugliotta	6 ft 10 in (2.08 m)	240 lb (109 kg)	––	NC State
C	28	Andrew Lang	6 ft 11 in (2.11 m)	245 lb (111 kg)	––	Arkansas
G	15	Darrick Martin	5 ft 11 in (1.80 m)	170 lb (77 kg)	––	UCLA
F	42	Sam Mitchell	6 ft 6 in (1.98 m)	210 lb (95 kg)	––	Mercer
G	30	Terry Porter	6 ft 3 in (1.91 m)	195 lb (88 kg)	––	UW–Stevens Point
G	34	Isaiah Rider	6 ft 5 in (1.96 m)	215 lb (98 kg)	––	UNLV
C	40	Eric Riley	7 ft 0 in (2.13 m)	245 lb (111 kg)	––	Michigan
G	4	Spud Webb	5 ft 6 in (1.68 m)	133 lb (60 kg)	––	NC State
G	5	Doug West	6 ft 6 in (1.98 m)	200 lb (91 kg)	––	Villanova
G	4	Micheal Williams	6 ft 2 in (1.88 m)	175 lb (79 kg)	––	Baylor

Coaches
Head coach
- Flip Saunders
Assistant(s)
- Greg Ballard
- Mike Schuler
- Jerry Sichting
- Randy Wittman

Legend
- (DP) Unsigned draft pick
- (FA) Free agent
- (S) Suspended
- Injured

Roster

== Regular season ==
=== Season standings ===
Midwest Division	W	L	PCT	GB	Home	Road	Div
y-San Antonio Spurs	59	23	.720	–	33–8	26–15	19–5
x-Utah Jazz	55	27	.671	4	34–7	21–20	14–10
x-Houston Rockets	48	34	.585	11	27–14	21–20	15–9
Denver Nuggets	35	47	.427	24	24–17	11–30	13–11
Minnesota Timberwolves	26	56	.317	33	17–24	9–32	10–14
Dallas Mavericks	26	56	.317	33	16–25	10–31	10–14
Vancouver Grizzlies	15	67	.183	44	10–31	5–36	3–21

Western Conference
#	Team	W	L	PCT	GB	GP
1	c-Seattle SuperSonics *	64	18	.780	–	82
2	y-San Antonio Spurs *	59	23	.720	5	82
3	x-Utah Jazz	55	27	.671	9	82
4	x-Los Angeles Lakers	53	29	.646	11	82
5	x-Houston Rockets	48	34	.585	16	82
6	x-Portland Trail Blazers	44	38	.537	20	82
7	x-Phoenix Suns	41	41	.500	23	82
8	x-Sacramento Kings	39	43	.476	25	82
9	Golden State Warriors	36	46	.439	28	82
10	Denver Nuggets	35	47	.427	29	82
11	Los Angeles Clippers	29	53	.354	35	82
12	Minnesota Timberwolves	26	56	.317	38	82
13	Dallas Mavericks	26	56	.317	38	82
14	Vancouver Grizzlies	15	67	.183	49	82

== Player statistics ==
=== Ragular season ===
Player	POS	GP	GS	MP	REB	AST	STL	BLK	PTS	MPG	RPG	APG	SPG	BPG	PPG
Terry Porter	PG	82	40	2,072	212	452	89	15	773	25.3	2.6	5.5	1.1	.2	9.4
Kevin Garnett	SF	80	43	2,293	501	145	86	131	835	28.7	6.3	1.8	1.1	1.6	10.4
Tom Gugliotta	PF	78	78	2,835	690	238	139	96	1,261	36.3	8.8	3.1	1.8	1.2	16.2
Sam Mitchell	SF	78	42	2,145	339	74	49	26	844	27.5	4.3	.9	.6	.3	10.8
Isaiah Rider	SG	75	68	2,594	309	213	48	23	1,470	34.6	4.1	2.8	.6	.3	19.6
Doug West	SG	73	16	1,639	161	119	30	17	465	22.5	2.2	1.6	.4	.2	6.4
Mark Davis	SF	57	0	571	125	47	40	22	188	10.0	2.2	.8	.7	.4	3.3
Marques Bragg	PF	53	0	369	79	8	17	8	131	7.0	1.5	.2	.3	.2	2.5
Sean Rooks^{†}	C	49	7	902	204	38	19	28	331	18.4	4.2	.8	.4	.6	6.8
Christian Laettner^{†}	C	44	44	1,518	302	129	40	43	792	34.5	6.9	2.9	.9	1.0	18.0
Jerome Allen	SG	41	0	362	25	49	21	5	108	8.8	.6	1.2	.5	.1	2.6
Darrick Martin^{†}	PG	35	16	747	44	156	26	2	254	21.3	1.3	4.5	.7	.1	7.3
Spud Webb^{†}	PG	26	21	645	40	154	25	5	244	24.8	1.5	5.9	1.0	.2	9.4
Eric Riley	C	25	10	310	76	5	8	16	92	12.4	3.0	.2	.3	.6	3.7
Andrew Lang^{†}	C	20	18	550	121	3	7	41	175	27.5	6.1	.2	.4	2.1	8.8
Micheal Williams	PG	9	7	189	23	31	5	3	55	21.0	2.6	3.4	.6	.3	6.1
Charles Smith	PG	8	0	39	5	6	1	0	6	4.9	.6	.8	.1	.0	.8

- ^{†} Denotes player spent time with another team in the season. Stats reflect time with the Timberwolves only.

== Awards and honors ==
- Kevin Garnett, NBA All-Rookie Second Team
