= Olden Polynice =

Haitian basketball player (born 1964)

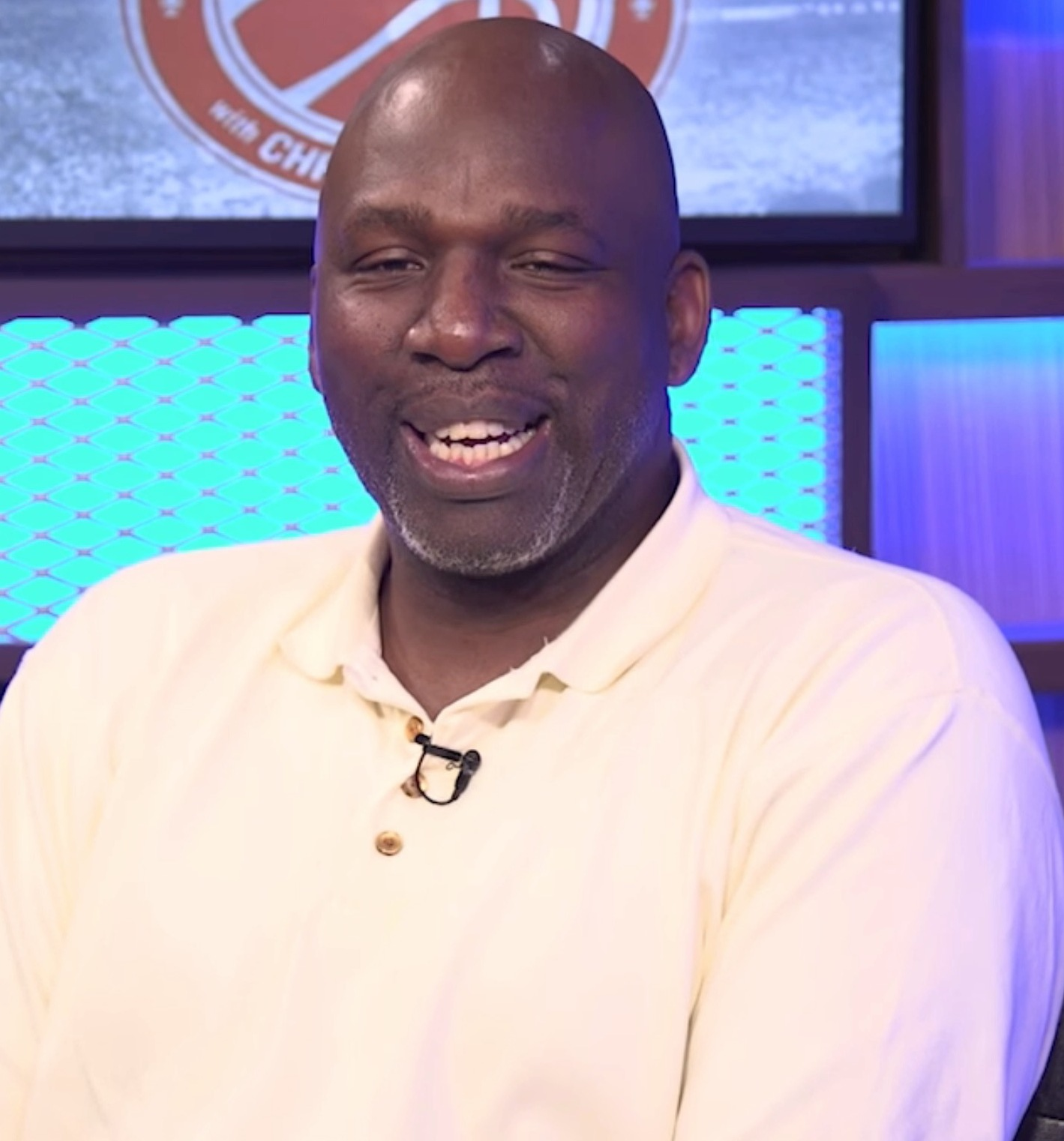
- Polynice in 2018

Personal information
- Born: November 21, 1964 (age 61) Port-au-Prince, Haiti
- Listed height: 6 ft 10 in (2.08 m)
- Listed weight: 250 lb (113 kg)

Career information
- High school: All Hallows (The Bronx, New York)
- College: Virginia (1983–1986)
- NBA draft: 1987: 1st round, 8th overall pick
- Drafted by: Chicago Bulls
- Playing career: 1986–2006
- Position: Center
- Number: 23, 0, 34, 30

Career history
- 1986–1987: Basket Rimini
- 1987–1991: Seattle SuperSonics
- 1991–1992: Los Angeles Clippers
- 1992–1994: Detroit Pistons
- 1994–1998: Sacramento Kings
- 1999: Seattle SuperSonics
- 1999–2001: Utah Jazz
- 2001–2002: Las Vegas Slam
- 2002–2003: Grand Rapids Hoops
- 2003: Pennsylvania ValleyDawgs
- 2003: Gary Steelheads
- 2003: Los Angeles Clippers
- 2004: Long Beach Jam
- 2004–2005: Michigan Mayhem
- 2005–2006: Los Angeles Aftershock

Career highlights
- Second-team All-ACC (1986)

Career NBA statistics
- Points: 8,265 (7.8 ppg)
- Rebounds: 7,110 (6.7 rpg)
- Personal fouls: 2,835 (2.7 pfpg)
- Stats at NBA.com
- Stats at Basketball Reference

Olden Polynice (born November 21, 1964) is a Haitian former professional basketball player. He played center for the Seattle SuperSonics, Los Angeles Clippers, Detroit Pistons, Sacramento Kings, and Utah Jazz of the National Basketball Association (NBA).

== Career ==
After graduating from All Hallows High School in the Bronx, Polynice played college basketball at the University of Virginia.

As a Freshman during the 1983–84 season, Polynice helped lead the UVA Cavaliers to the 1984 Final Four when they won the NCAA Eastern Region as the # 7 seed. UVA defeating the #10 seed Iona (58–57), the #2 seed Arkansas (53–51 in OT), the #3 seed Syracuse (63–55) and the #4 seed Indiana (50–48) en route to the Final Four. In the Final Four, UVA lost in overtime 49–47 to the Midwest Region Champion University of Houston denying UVA a chance at the National Championship game.

As a junior during the 1985–86 season, Polynice was honored for his play by being named first team All-ACC.

After three years in college, he played with Serie A1's Basket Rimini in 1986–87, averaging 17 points and 11 rebounds. He was selected 8th overall by the Chicago Bulls in the 1987 NBA draft, but was immediately traded to the Seattle SuperSonics for Scottie Pippen. Polynice then arrived in Detroit in 1992 after being traded by the Los Angeles Clippers and departed two years later when he was traded to the Sacramento Kings for Pete Chilcutt and two draft picks.

In 15 NBA seasons, Polynice averaged 23.5 minutes, 7.8 points and 6.7 rebounds per game, with a career PER of 13.2. At 6'11", he was often signed by teams in need of a rebounder and interior player, and consistently ranked among the league leaders in offensive rebounds. Polynice retired from the NBA in 2004 after a brief return to the Clippers. He later played for the Los Angeles Aftershock of the ABA.

Upon retiring, Polynice served as coach for the ABA's Long Beach Breakers. In 1997, still active, he worked as a color commentator for the WNBA's Sacramento Monarchs.

He now runs the Polynice Basketball Organization founded with the help of his nephews Brian and Jordan Polynice.

== Personal life ==
Olden went on a hunger strike in 1993 for the sufferings the Haitian people were facing. He is Catholic.

== Career statistics ==
Legend
GP	Games played	GS	Games started	MPG	Minutes per game
FG%	Field goal percentage	3P%	3-point field goal percentage	FT%	Free throw percentage
RPG	Rebounds per game	APG	Assists per game	SPG	Steals per game
BPG	Blocks per game	PPG	Points per game	**Bold**	Career high

*	Led the league

=== NBA ===
==== Regular season ====
Year	Team	GP	GS	MPG	FG%	3P%	FT%	RPG	APG	SPG	BPG	PPG
1987–88	Seattle	**82**	0	13.2	.465	.000	**.639**	4.0	.4	.4	.3	4.1
1988–89	Seattle	80	0	10.4	.506	.000	.593	2.6	.3	.5	.4	2.9
1989–90	Seattle	79	7	13.7	.540	.500	.475	3.8	.2	.3	.3	4.6
1990–91	Seattle	48	0	20.0	.545	–	.588	5.6	.3	.5	.4	8.3
1990–91	L.A. Clippers	31	30	**36.5**	**.579**	.000	.572	9.1	.8	.5	.4	12.3
1991–92	L.A. Clippers	76	65	24.1	.519	.000	.622	7.1	.6	**.6**	.3	8.1
1992–93	Detroit	67	18	19.4	.490	.000	.465	6.2	.4	.5	.3	7.3
1993–94	Detroit	37	36	**36.5**	.547	.000	.457	**12.3**	.6	**.6**	**1.0**	**13.1**
1993–94	Sacramento	31	29	33.9	.484	.000	.556	11.4	.6	**.6**	**1.0**	9.8
1994–95	Sacramento	81	81	31.3	.544	**1.000**	**.639**	9.0	.8	**.6**	.6	10.8
1995–96	Sacramento	81	80	30.1	.527	.333	.601	9.4	.7	**.6**	.8	12.2
1996–97	Sacramento	**82**	**82***	35.3	.457	.000	.562	9.4	**2.2**	**.6**	**1.0**	12.5
1997–98	Sacramento	70	25	20.8	.459	.000	.452	6.3	1.5	.5	.6	7.9
1998–99	Seattle	48	47	30.9	.472	**1.000**	.309	8.9	.9	.4	.6	7.7
1999–00	Utah	**82**	79	22.2	.510	.500	.311	5.5	.5	.4	**1.0**	5.3
2000–01	Utah	81	79	20.0	.496	.000	.262	4.7	.4	.3	**1.0**	5.3
2003–04	L.A. Clippers	2	0	6.0	–	–	–	1.0	.5	.5	.0	.0
Career		1,058	658	23.5	.505	.192	.535	6.7	.7	.5	.6	7.8

==== Playoffs ====
Year	Team	GP	GS	MPG	FG%	3P%	FT%	RPG	APG	SPG	BPG	PPG
1988	Seattle	5	0	8.8	.455	–	.000	1.6	.0	.6	.0	2.0
1989	Seattle	8	0	20.3	**.610**	–	.538	7.8	.1	**.8**	.5	7.1
1992	L.A. Clippers	5	0	12.6	.583	–	.333	3.6	.4	.2	.2	3.2
1996	Sacramento	4	4	**35.3**	.522	**1.000**	.667	**12.0**	**.8**	.3	**1.8**	**13.8**
2000	Utah	**10**	**10**	26.0	.538	–	.500	6.6	.5	.3	.8	5.9
2001	Utah	5	5	20.0	.533	.000	**.700**	3.8	.2	.2	.4	7.8
Career		37	19	20.8	.547	.500	.543	6.0	.3	.4	.6	6.4

=== College ===
Year	Team	GP	GS	MPG	FG%	3P%	FT%	RPG	APG	SPG	BPG	PPG
1983–84	Virginia	**33**		26.2	.551		.588	5.6	**.6**	.1	.5	7.7
1984–85	Virginia	32		34.2	**.603**		.599	7.6	.5	**.4**	**1.1**	13.0
1985–86	Virginia	30		**35.8**	.572		**.637**	**8.0**	.5	.3	**1.1**	**16.1**
Career		95		31.9	.578		.612	7.0	.5	.3	.9	12.1
