= 1996–97 Phoenix Suns season =

Professional basketball season

- Head coach: Cotton Fitzsimmons (resigned) (0–8); Danny Ainge (40–34)
- General manager: Bryan Colangelo
- Owner: Jerry Colangelo
- Arena: America West Arena

Results
- Record: 40–42 (.488)
- Place: Division: 4th (Pacific); Conference: 7th (Western)
- Playoff finish: First round (lost to SuperSonics 2–3)
- Stats at Basketball Reference

Local media
- Television: KUTP; Fox Sports Arizona; Cox Sports
- Radio: KTAR

The 1996–97 Phoenix Suns season was the 29th season for the Phoenix Suns in the National Basketball Association. For the first time since the 1991–92 season, All-Star forward Charles Barkley was not on the Suns opening day roster.

== Season summary ==
=== Off-season ===
This season was notable for the Suns drafting point guard Steve Nash out of Santa Clara University with the 15th overall pick in the 1996 NBA draft. During the off-season, the team acquired Sam Cassell, Robert Horry, Mark Bryant and Chucky Brown from the Houston Rockets, and signed free agent Rex Chapman.

=== Regular season ===
However, despite the addition of Chapman, Cassell and Horry, the Suns struggled losing their first 13 games of the regular season, as Kevin Johnson missed the first eleven games due to a hernia injury. After an 0–8 start to the season, head coach Cotton Fitzsimmons resigned and was replaced with former Suns guard Danny Ainge as the team's new coach. As the season progressed, the Suns were involved in several trades. In December, the team first traded Brown to the Milwaukee Bucks in exchange for Darrin Hancock, who never played for the Suns and was released to free agency. Later on that month, the team traded Cassell, second-year star Michael Finley, and A.C. Green to the Dallas Mavericks in exchange for All-Star guard Jason Kidd, second-year center Loren Meyer and Tony Dumas. In January, the team dealt Horry, and Joe Kleine to the Los Angeles Lakers in exchange for former Suns forward Cedric Ceballos, and Rumeal Robinson; Robinson was released to free agency after a brief stint with the Suns, and later on re-signed with his former team, the Portland Trail Blazers. This season would not be matched in terms of in-season transactions for the franchise until both the 2014–15, and the 2015–16 seasons.

The Suns held a 17–31 record at the All-Star break, but played above .500 in winning percentage for the remainder of the season, as the team posted an 11-game winning streak between March and April. The Suns finished in fourth place in the Pacific Division with a 40–42 record, earned the seventh seed in the Western Conference, and qualified for the NBA playoffs for the ninth consecutive year. This team would also be the first, and only NBA team to start out the regular season with a 10+ losing streak, yet make it to the playoffs by the end of the season; not only that, but they would also be the first team to record a 10+ game winning streak, after recording a 10+ game losing streak earlier in the season.

Johnson averaged 20.1 points, 9.3 assists and 1.5 steals per game, while Ceballos averaged 15.3 points and 6.6 rebounds per game in 42 games after the trade, Chapman contributed 13.8 points per game and 110 three-point field goals, and sixth man Danny Manning provided the team with 13.5 points and 6.1 rebounds per game off the bench. In addition, Wesley Person contributed 13.5 points per game, and led the Suns with 171 three-point field goals, while Kidd averaged 11.6 points, 9.0 assists and 2.4 steals per game in 33 games, Bryant provided with 9.3 points and 5.2 rebounds per game, but only played just 41 games due to an abdominal strain injury, and Hot Rod Williams averaged 8.0 points, 8.3 rebounds and 1.3 blocks per game. Also off the bench, Wayman Tisdale provided with 6.5 points and 2.3 rebounds per game, and Nash contributed 3.3 points and 2.1 assists per game.

During the NBA All-Star weekend at the Gund Arena in Cleveland, Ohio, Nash was selected for the NBA Rookie Game, as a member of the Western Conference Rookie team. Johnson finished tied in 17th place in Most Valuable Player voting, while Manning finished tied in seventh place in Sixth Man of the Year voting, and Ainge finished in fourth place in Coach of the Year voting. The Suns finished seventh in the NBA in home-game attendance, with an attendance of 779,940 at the America West Arena during the regular season.

=== NBA playoffs ===
In the Western Conference First Round of the 1997 NBA playoffs, the Suns faced off against the 2nd–seeded, and Pacific Division champion Seattle SuperSonics, who were led by the All-Star trio of Gary Payton, Shawn Kemp and Detlef Schrempf. The Suns managed to win Game 1 over the SuperSonics on the road, 106–101 at the KeyArena at Seattle Center, in which Chapman scored 42 points and made 9 out of 17 three-point field-goal attempts; it was a then-record for the most three-pointers made in an NBA playoff game. However, the Suns lost Game 2 to the SuperSonics on the road by a 44-point margin, 122–78. The Suns won Game 3 over the SuperSonics at home, 110–103 at the America West Arena to take a 2–1 series lead, but then lost Game 4 at home in overtime, 122–115; a memorable highlight of the game featured Chapman hitting a three-point buzzer-beater to send the game into overtime. With the series tied at 2–2, the Suns lost Game 5 to the SuperSonics at the KeyArena at Seattle Center, 116–92, thus losing in a hard-fought five-game series.

=== Aftermath ===
Following the season, Person and Dumas were both traded to the Cleveland Cavaliers in a three-team trade, and Tisdale retired.

== Offseason ==
=== NBA draft ===
Round	Pick	Player	Position	Nationality	College
1	15	Steve Nash	Guard	Canada	Santa Clara
2	39	Russ Millard	Forward	United States	Iowa
2	43	Ben Davis	Forward	United States	Arizona

The Suns used their first-round pick to select point guard Steve Nash from Santa Clara. Nash averaged 14.9 points, 3.1 rebounds and 4.5 assists per game in four years with the Broncos. On July 24, the Suns signed Nash to a three-year rookie contract for $3.2 million. He would spend his first two seasons with the Suns playing a limited role behind All-Star guards Kevin Johnson and Jason Kidd, before being traded to the Dallas Mavericks in 1998. Nash would later return to the franchise as a free agent in 2004, winning consecutive MVP awards in 2005 and 2006 and ultimately making it to the Phoenix Suns Ring of Honor on October 30, 2015.

The Suns received the 39th pick from a trade with the Detroit Pistons in 1994. With the pick they would select power forward Russ Millard from Iowa. Millard averaged 10.1 points and 5.3 rebounds per game in four years with the Hawkeyes. Millard would sign with Italian club Pallacanestro Varese before the season and would never play in the NBA.

The Suns used their second-round pick to select power forward Ben Davis from Arizona. Davis averaged 12.5 points and 8.1 rebounds per game in two years with the Wildcats. On September 25, the Suns signed Davis to a one-year rookie contract for $220,000. Davis spent much of the year on the injured reserve with a finger injury. He would appear in 20 games, average 1.5 points and 1.4 rebounds in 4.9 minutes a game. Davis would sign as a free agent with the New York Knicks after the season. He would later return to the Suns shortly in the 1999–2000 season, appearing in just five games before being waived.

== Roster ==
1996–97 Phoenix Suns roster
Players

Pos.	No.	Player	Height	Weight	DOB	From
C	45	Mike Brown	6 ft 9 in (2.06 m)	257 lb (117 kg)	1963–07–19	George Washington
F	2	Mark Bryant	6 ft 9 in (2.06 m)	245 lb (111 kg)	1965–04–25	Seton Hall
F	1	Cedric Ceballos	6 ft 6 in (1.98 m)	190 lb (86 kg)	1969–08–02	Cal State Fullerton
G/F	3	Rex Chapman	6 ft 4 in (1.93 m)	185 lb (84 kg)	1967–10–05	Kentucky
F	43	Ben Davis (injured)	6 ft 9 in (2.06 m)	240 lb (109 kg)	1972–12–26	Arizona
G	27	Tony Dumas (injured)	6 ft 6 in (1.98 m)	190 lb (86 kg)	1972–08–25	UMKC
G	7	Kevin Johnson	6 ft 1 in (1.85 m)	180 lb (82 kg)	1966–03–04	California
G	32	Jason Kidd	6 ft 4 in (1.93 m)	205 lb (93 kg)	1973–03–23	California
C	17	Horacio Llamas	6 ft 11 in (2.11 m)	285 lb (129 kg)	1973–07–17	Grand Canyon
F/C	15	Danny Manning	6 ft 10 in (2.08 m)	230 lb (104 kg)	1966–05–17	Kansas
C	40	Loren Meyer	6 ft 10 in (2.08 m)	257 lb (117 kg)	1972–12–30	Iowa State
G	13	Steve Nash	6 ft 3 in (1.91 m)	195 lb (88 kg)	1974–02–07	Santa Clara
G/F	11	Wesley Person	6 ft 6 in (1.98 m)	195 lb (88 kg)	1971–03–28	Auburn
F	23	Wayman Tisdale	6 ft 9 in (2.06 m)	240 lb (109 kg)	1964–06–09	Oklahoma
C	18	John Williams	6 ft 11 in (2.11 m)	215 lb (98 kg)	1962–08–09	Tulane

Coaches
Head coach
- Danny Ainge
Assistant(s)
- Frank Johnson
- Donn Nelson
- Paul Silas

Legend
- (DP) Unsigned draft pick
- (FA) Free agent
- (S) Suspended
- Injured

== Regular season ==
=== Standings ===
Pacific Division	W	L	PCT	GB	Home	Road	Div
y-Seattle SuperSonics	57	25	.695	–	31–10	26–15	16–8
x-Los Angeles Lakers	56	26	.683	1	31–10	25–16	18–6
x-Portland Trail Blazers	49	33	.598	8	29–12	20–21	15–9
x-Phoenix Suns	40	42	.488	17	25–16	15–26	13–11
x-Los Angeles Clippers	36	46	.439	21	21–20	15–26	10–14
Sacramento Kings	34	48	.415	23	22–19	12–29	8–16
Golden State Warriors	30	52	.366	27	18–23	12–29	4–20

1996–97 NBA West standings
#	Western Conference				
#	Team	W	L	PCT	GB
1	c-Utah Jazz	64	18	.780	–
2	y-Seattle SuperSonics	57	25	.695	7
3	x-Houston Rockets	57	25	.695	7
4	x-Los Angeles Lakers	56	26	.683	8
5	x-Portland Trail Blazers	49	33	.598	15
6	x-Minnesota Timberwolves	40	42	.488	24
7	x-Phoenix Suns	40	42	.488	24
8	x-Los Angeles Clippers	36	46	.439	28
9	Sacramento Kings	34	48	.415	30
10	Golden State Warriors	30	52	.366	34
11	Dallas Mavericks	24	58	.293	40
12	Denver Nuggets	21	61	.256	43
13	San Antonio Spurs	20	62	.244	44
14	Vancouver Grizzlies	14	68	.171	50

== Playoffs ==
The Suns came into the playoffs as the seventh seed, facing the 1996 Western Conference champion Seattle SuperSonics in the first round. In game one, Rex Chapman set a playoff record with 9 three-pointers, finishing the game with 42 points and leading the Suns to a 106–101 upset in Seattle. The Sonics responded with a 44-point blowout in game two, evening the series 1–1.

The Suns recovered at home in game three. After an early 15-point deficit, Wesley Person led the team to a comeback 110–103 victory with 29 points and 10 rebounds. The Suns had a chance to close the series at home in game four. Behind by eleven points in the final two minutes of regulation, the Suns cut to lead to two before fouling Detlef Schrempf with 5.4 seconds remaining. Schrempf would miss the second of two free throws, giving the Sonics a 107–104 lead. Rex Chapman would respond with a famous turnaround three-pointer to send the game into overtime. The Sonics would outscore the Suns 15–8 in extra time to gain a 122–115 victory.

The Suns would head back to Seattle tied 2–2 for a deciding fifth game. The Suns turned to small ball, starting four guards (Jason Kidd, Kevin Johnson, Rex Chapman and Wesley Person) along with center Hot Rod Williams. The Sonics would dominate the first half, leading by 22 at the break. A third quarter rally would bring the lead to eight, and a Wesley Person three-pointer to open the fourth quarter brought the lead to just five. But the Sonics would go on a 19–7 run in the final six minutes to claim a 116–92 victory.

=== Game log ===
1997 playoff game log
First Round: 2–3 (home: 1–1; road: 1–2)

Game	Date	Team	Score	High points	High rebounds	High assists	Location Attendance	Series
1	April 25	@ Seattle	W 106–101	Rex Chapman (42)	Kevin Johnson (7)	Jason Kidd (10)	KeyArena; 17,072	1–0
2	April 27	@ Seattle	L 78–122	Rex Chapman (18)	Wesley Person (10)	Jason Kidd (8)	KeyArena; 17,072	1–1
3	April 29	Seattle	W 110–103	Wesley Person (29)	Wesley Person (10)	Jason Kidd (10)	America West Arena; 19,023	2–1
4	May 1	Seattle	L 115–122 (OT)	Johnson, Kidd (23)	Danny Manning (10)	Jason Kidd (14)	America West Arena; 19,023	2–2
5	May 3	@ Seattle	L 92–116	Wesley Person (26)	Kidd, Person (8)	Jason Kidd (7)	KeyArena; 17,072	2–3

1997 schedule

== Awards and honors ==
=== Week/Month ===
- Kevin Johnson was named Player of the Week for games played March 24 through March 30.
- Kevin Johnson was named Player of the Month for April.

=== All-Star ===
- This was only the third season in franchise history that the Suns were not represented in the All-Star Game, after the 1986 and 1988 seasons.
- Steve Nash was selected to compete for the Western Conference in the Rookie Challenge.

=== Season ===
- Kevin Johnson finished 17th in MVP voting.
- Danny Manning finished seventh in Sixth Man of the Year voting.

== Injuries/Missed games ==
- 10/31/96: Kevin Johnson: Abdominal hernia; placed on injured reserve until November 24
- 10/31/96: Mark Bryant: Torn knee cartilage; placed on injured reserve until December 6
- 10/31/96: Hot Rod Williams: Toe surgery; placed on injured list until November 26
- 11/14/96: Sam Cassell: Flu; did not play
- 11/23/96: Wayman Tisdale: Shoulder tendinitis; placed on injured list until December 30
- 11/26/96: Ben Davis: Finger ligament damage; placed on injured reserve until January 12
- 11/26/96: Sam Cassell: Personal reasons; did not play
- 11/27/96: Sam Cassell: Personal reasons; did not play
- 11/29/96: Sam Cassell: Personal reasons; did not play
- 12/06/96: Darrin Hancock: Bilateral knee bruises; placed on injured reserve until waived on December 10
- 12/21/96: Joe Kleine: Back spasms; did not play
- 12/28/96: Kevin Johnson: Flu; did not play
- 12/30/96: Tony Dumas: Injured finger; did not play
- 12/30/96: Jason Kidd: Collarbone hairline fracture; placed on injured list until December 14
- 01/06/97: Robert Horry: Two-game team suspension (threw towel at coach Danny Ainge); out until traded on January 10
- 01/10/97: Rex Chapman: Sprained ankle; did not play
- 01/12/97: Tony Dumas: Bruised knee; placed on injured list until April 20
- 01/13/97: Mark Bryant: Abdominal strain; did not play
- 01/13/97: Rex Chapman: Sprained ankle; did not play
- 01/14/97: Mark Bryant: Abdominal strain; did not play
- 01/14/97: Rex Chapman: Sprained ankle; did not play
- 01/18/97: Mark Bryant: Abdominal strain; did not play
- 01/29/97: Rex Chapman: Fractured finger; placed on injured reserve until March 2
- 02/11/97: Hot Rod Williams: Flu; did not play
- 02/26/97: Danny Manning: Sore leg; did not play
- 03/02/97: Ben Davis: Injured finger; placed on injured reserve until March 13
- 03/09/97: Mark Bryant: Bruised foot; did not play
- 03/11/97: Mark Bryant: Bruised foot; did not play
- 03/13/97: Mark Bryant: Bruised foot; did not play
- 03/13/97: Loren Meyer: Strained lower back; placed on injured list until March 25
- 03/17/97: Mark Bryant: Bruised foot; placed on injured reserve until April 20
- 03/22/97: Cedric Ceballos: Bruised knee; did not play
- 03/26/97: Cedric Ceballos: Bruised knee; did not play
- 03/28/97: Cedric Ceballos: Bruised knee; did not play
- 03/28/97: Wayman Tisdale: Personal reasons; did not play
- 03/30/97: Wayman Tisdale: Personal reasons; did not play
- 04/02/97: Wayman Tisdale: Personal reasons; did not play
- 04/05/97: Ben Davis: Injured finger; placed on injured reserve until April 20
- 04/15/97: Wesley Person: Flu; did not play
- 04/18/97: Wesley Person: Flu; did not play
- 04/19/97: Danny Manning: Injured foot; did not play

== Player statistics ==
Legend
GP	Games played	GS	Games started	MPG	Minutes per game
FG%	Field-goal percentage	3P%	3-point field-goal percentage	FT%	Free-throw percentage
RPG	Rebounds per game	APG	Assists per game	SPG	Steals per game
BPG	Blocks per game	PPG	Points per game

=== Season ===
Player	GP	GS	MPG	FG%	3P%	FT%	RPG	APG	SPG	BPG	PPG
Dexter Boney	8	0	6.0	.316	.167	.750	0.8	0.0	.3	.1	2.4
Chucky Brown*	10	0	8.3	.500	.	.727	1.6	0.4	.0	.02	3.4
Mike Brown	6	1	13.8	.417	.	.600	4.2	0.8	.2	.3	2.7
Mark Bryant	41	18	24.8	.553†	.	.704	5.2	1.1	.5	.1	9.3
Sam Cassell*	22	9	24.5	.415	.306	.855#	2.3	4.5	1.0	.3	14.8
Cedric Ceballos*	42	32	27.3	.464	.259	.737	6.6	1.2	.7	.4	15.3
Rex Chapman	65	33	28.2	.443	.350	.832	2.8	2.8	.8	.1	13.8
Ben Davis	20	0	4.9	.385	.	.450	1.4	0.0	.2	.1	1.5
Tony Dumas*	6	1	8.5	.316	.250	.500	0.3	0.5	.0	.2	2.3
Michael Finley*	27	18	29.5	.475	.255	.812	4.4	2.5	.7	.1	13.0
A.C. Green*	27	19	20.3	.477	.000	.646	5.1	0.6	.7	.0	5.7
Robert Horry*	32	15	22.5	.421	.308	.640	3.7	1.7	.9	.8	6.9
Kevin Johnson	70	70	38.0	.496	.441^	.852#	3.6	9.3	1.5+	.2	20.1
Jason Kidd*	33	23	35.5	.423	.400	.688	4.8	9.0	2.4+	.4	11.6
Joe Kleine*	23	10	15.9	.400	1.000^	.722	3.5	0.5	.4	.3	3.4
Horacio Llamas	20	2	5.1	.536	.	.500	0.9	0.2	.5	.3	1.7
Danny Manning	77	17	27.7	.536†	.194	.721	6.1	2.2	1.1	1.0	13.5
Loren Meyer*	35	17	12.8	.446	.600^	.712	2.7	.3	.1	.3	5.4
Steve Nash	65	2	10.5	.423	.418	.824	1.0	2.1	.3	.0	3.3
Wesley Person	80	42	29.1	.453	.413	.798	3.7	1.5	1.1	.2	13.5
Rumeal Robinson*	12	0	7.3	.471	.300	.250	0.6	0.7	.1	.0	3.0
Wayman Tisdale	53	15	14.7	.426	.	.625	2.3	0.4	.2	.4	6.5
John "Hot Rod" Williams	68	66	31.4	.490	.000	.672	8.3	1.5	1.0	1.3	8.0

* – Stats with the Suns.
† – Minimum 300 field goals made.
^ – Minimum 82 three-pointers made.
# – Minimum 125 free throws made.
+ – Minimum 50 games played.

=== Playoffs ===
Player	GP	GS	MPG	FG%	3P%	FT%	RPG	APG	SPG	BPG	PPG
Mike Brown	4	0	6.8	.400	.	.875	1.0	0.3	.0	.0	2.8
Mark Bryant	4	0	9.0	.400	.	1.000#	1.0	0.0	.0	.0	2.8
Cedric Ceballos	5	0	21.4	.333	.250	1.000#	5.2	0.6	.8	.6	6.6
Rex Chapman	5	5	38.2	.494	.458	.680	3.2	2.6	.4	.0	24.2
Kevin Johnson	5	5	41.6	.295	.136	.879	4.4	6.0	2.6	.0	16.8
Jason Kidd	5	5	41.4	.396	.364	.526	6.0	9.8	2.2	.4	12.0
Danny Manning	5	0	23.2	.578	.000	.933#	6.0	1.4	.8	1.4	13.2
Loren Meyer	3	0	4.7	.000	.000	.	2.0	0.3	.0	.7	0.0
Steve Nash	4	0	3.8	.222	.250	.	0.3	0.3	.2	.2	1.3
Wesley Person	5	1	32.6	.472	.424	.778	6.6	1.2	.8	.6	15.6
Wayman Tisdale	4	4	9.0	.400	.	.	1.8	0.0	.0	.0	3.0
John "Hot Rod" Williams	5	5	21.0	.533	.	.400	4.6	0.6	.4	1.6	4.0

# – Minimum 10 free throws made.

Player statistics citation:

== Transactions ==
=== Trades ===
August 19, 1996	To Houston Rockets (United States) Charles Barkley 1999 second-round draft pick ( (United States) Tyrone Washington)	To Phoenix Suns (United States) Sam Cassell (United States) Robert Horry (United States) Mark Bryant (United States) Chucky Brown
September 25, 1996	To Milwaukee Bucks (United States) Elliot Perry	To Phoenix Suns (United States) Marty Conlon 1999 first-round draft pick ( (United States) James Posey)
December 4, 1996	To Milwaukee Bucks (United States) Chucky Brown	To Phoenix Suns (United States) Darrin Hancock Conditional 1997 second-round draft pick
December 26, 1996	To Dallas Mavericks (United States) Sam Cassell (United States) Michael Finley (United States) A.C. Green 1998 second-round draft pick ( (United States) Greg Buckner)	To Phoenix Suns (United States) Jason Kidd (United States) Loren Meyer (United States) Tony Dumas
January 10, 1997	To Los Angeles Lakers (United States) Robert Horry (United States) Joe Kleine	To Phoenix Suns (United States) Cedric Ceballos (United States) Rumeal Robinson

=== Free agents ===
==== Additions ====
Date	Player	Contract	Former Team
October 2, 1996	Evric Gray	Undisclosed	Chicago Bulls
October 11, 1996	Rex Chapman	Signed one-year contract	Miami Heat
January 31, 1997	Dexter Boney	Signed two 10-day contracts	San Antonio Spurs
February 21, 1997	Horacio Llamas	Signed two 10-day contracts	Grand Canyon Antelopes
March 13, 1997	Horacio Llamas	Signed for rest of season	Phoenix Suns
April 5, 1997	Mike Brown	Signed for rest of season	Philadelphia 76ers

==== Subtractions ====
Date	Player	Reason left	New team
July 1, 1996	Terrence Rencher	Free agent	Grand Rapids Hoops (CBA)
July 19, 1996	Chris Carr	Free agent	Minnesota Timberwolves
October 22, 1996	Evric Gray	Waived	New Jersey Nets
October 29, 1996	Marty Conlon	Waived	Boston Celtics
October 29, 1996	Mario Bennett	Waived	Grand Rapids Hoops (CBA)
October 29, 1996	John Coker	Waived	Toronto Raptors
December 11, 1996	Darrin Hancock	Waived	Atlanta Hawks
February 14, 1996	Rumeal Robinson	Waived	Portland Trail Blazers
February 20, 1997	Dexter Boney	Waived	Florida Beach Dogs (CBA)

Player transactions citation:
