= Sam Cassell =

American basketball player and coach (born 1969)

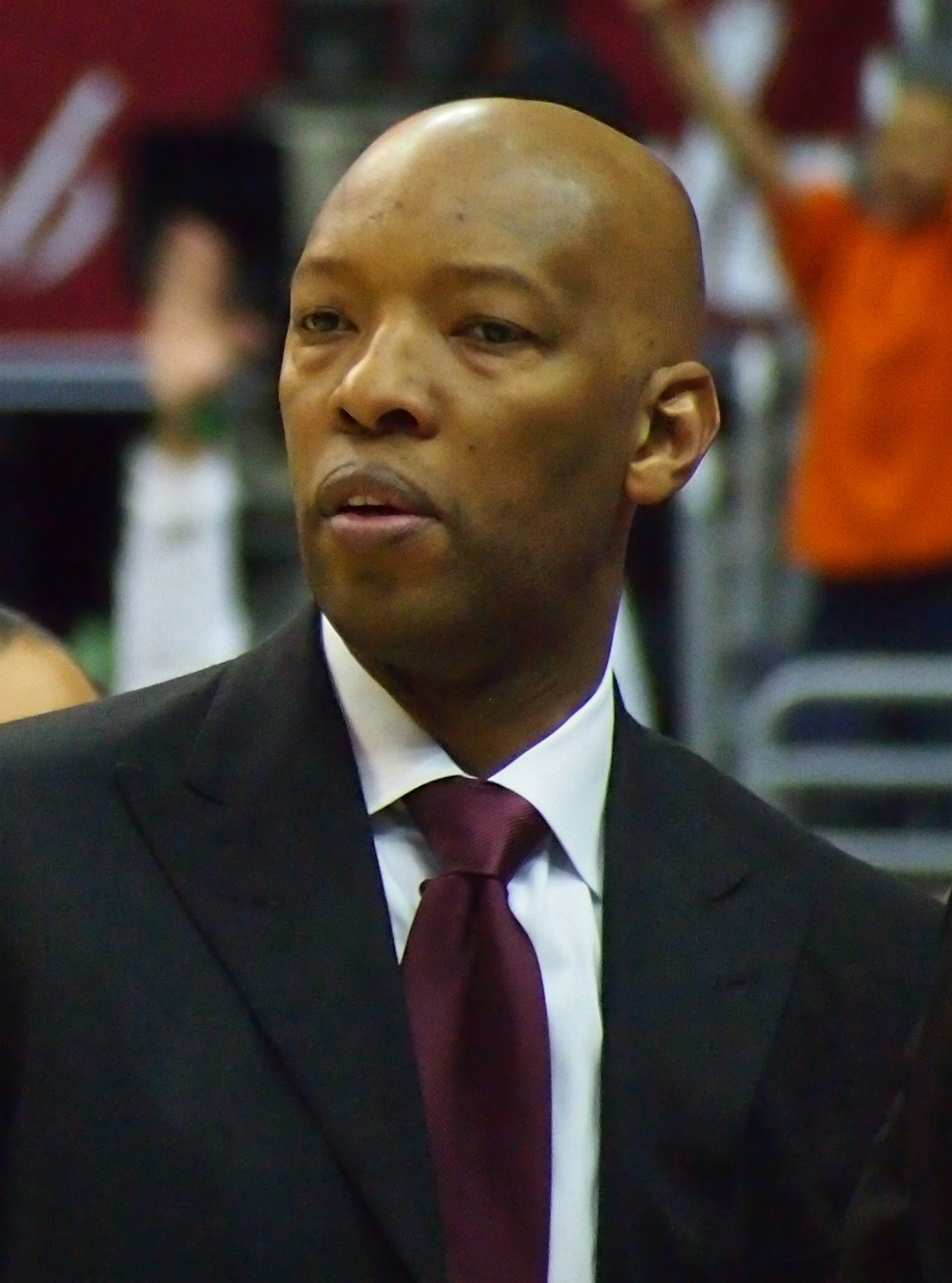
- Cassell in 2013

Boston Celtics
- Title: Assistant coach
- League: NBA

Personal information
- Born: November 18, 1969 (age 57) Baltimore, Maryland, U.S.
- Listed height: 6 ft 3 in (1.91 m)
- Listed weight: 185 lb (84 kg)

Career information
- High school: Paul Laurence Dunbar (Baltimore, Maryland); Maine Central Institute (Pittsfield, Maine)
- College: San Jacinto (1989–1991); Florida State (1991–1993)
- NBA draft: 1993: 1st round, 24th overall pick
- Drafted by: Houston Rockets
- Playing career: 1993–2009
- Position: Point guard
- Number: 10, 20, 19, 28
- Coaching career: 2009–present

Career history

Playing
- 1993–1996: Houston Rockets
- 1996: Phoenix Suns
- 1996–1997: Dallas Mavericks
- 1997–1999: New Jersey Nets
- 1999–2003: Milwaukee Bucks
- 2003–2005: Minnesota Timberwolves
- 2005–2008: Los Angeles Clippers
- 2008: Boston Celtics

Coaching
- 2009–2014: Washington Wizards (assistant)
- 2014–2020: Los Angeles Clippers (assistant)
- 2020–2023: Philadelphia 76ers (assistant)
- 2023–present: Boston Celtics (assistant)

Career highlights
- As player: 3× NBA champion (1994, 1995, 2008); NBA All-Star (2004); All-NBA Second Team (2004); 2× Second-team All-ACC (1992, 1993); No. 10 jersey honored by Florida State Seminoles; As assistant coach: NBA champion (2024)

Career statistics
- Points: 15,635 (15.7 ppg)
- Rebounds: 3,221 (3.2 rpg)
- Assists: 5,939 (6.0 apg)
- Stats at NBA.com
- Stats at Basketball Reference

Samuel James Cassell Sr. (born November 18, 1969) is an American professional basketball coach and former point guard who serves as an assistant coach for the Boston Celtics of the National Basketball Association (NBA). Drafted 24th overall in the 1993 NBA draft out of Florida State, Cassell played for eight different teams during his 15-year career. He was selected to the NBA All-Star Game and All-NBA Team once, both in the 2003–04 season.

In his first two seasons, he helped the Houston Rockets win back to back championships, in 1994 and 1995, and won a third with the Boston Celtics in 2008, his last season. He also helped the Milwaukee Bucks and Minnesota Timberwolves reach the Conference Finals of the playoffs in 2001 and 2004 respectively, the latter's first-ever in franchise history, and helped the Los Angeles Clippers to their first-ever playoff series victory in 2006. Known for his mid-range jumpshot, Cassell often made clutch baskets late in the fourth quarter to help his team win games.

== College career ==
After graduating from Paul Laurence Dunbar Community High School in East Baltimore, Maryland, Cassell spent a year at Maine Central Institute in Pittsfield, Maine, under coach Max Good. From MCI, Cassell was successfully recruited to attend DePaul University. He was declared academically ineligible based on National Collegiate Athletic Association (NCAA)'s Proposition 48 standards, and ended up starting his college career at San Jacinto College in Pasadena, Texas, where he was known as a big scorer. He moved on to Florida State University in Tallahassee for his junior and senior years. In his senior year in 1992–93, he averaged 18.3 points, 4.9 assists, and 4.3 rebounds per game and led the Atlantic Coast Conference (ACC) in steals. Cassell and teammate Bob Sura formed the highest scoring and rebounding backcourt in the nation with 38.2 points and 10.4 rebounds per game. Cassell's 1992–93 Seminoles team finished with a 25–10 record and advanced to the Elite Eight in the NCAA Tournament, where they lost to the University of Kentucky's Wildcats.

On February 14, 2008, in a game against Wake Forest, Cassell's jersey was retired by Florida State.

== Playing career ==
=== Houston Rockets (1993–1996) ===
Cassell was selected out of Florida State University with the 24th overall pick of the 1993 NBA draft by the Houston Rockets. Playing mostly as a backup to Kenny Smith, Cassell developed a reputation as "clutch" and was usually on the court for the fourth quarter of close games. He was a key contributor during the Rockets playoff run his rookie year, notably dropping 22 points and seven assists in a Game 7 win against the Phoenix Suns in the Western Conference Semifinals, and scoring 7 points in the final 32 seconds of a 93–89 win in game 3 of the 1994 NBA Finals against the New York Knicks. The Rockets would win the championship in seven games.

Cassell saw an increase in his role during his second year, appearing in all 82 games that season. He again helped the Rockets reach the NBA Finals for the second consecutive year. In game 2 of the Finals against the Orlando Magic, Cassell scored 31 points. The Rockets swept the Magic, giving Cassell his second championship in just two years in the league.

In his third season, the two-time defending champion Rockets were swept out of the second round of the playoffs by the Seattle SuperSonics. Cassell's minutes, scoring and usage rates all increased in his third season, but he missed 21 games with injuries. Rockets management feared their window of winning another championship with Olajuwon, Drexler and Smith was closing, and looked to trade for another star-caliber player.

=== Phoenix Suns (1996) ===
After the 1995–96 season, he was traded to the Phoenix Suns, along with Robert Horry, Chucky Brown, and Mark Bryant, in exchange for former league MVP Charles Barkley. Cassell, who was in the final year of his rookie contract, frequently clashed with head coach Cotton Fitzsimmons; Fitzsimmons subsequently resigned following an 0–8 start. On December 12, 1996, Cassell led the 5–14 Suns into Utah and defeated the Jazz who at the time were on a 15-game winning streak. Cassell scored 21 points in the 95–87 road win. Under new head coach Danny Ainge, the Suns saw marked improvement with Cassell leading the team with 14.8 points per game.

=== Dallas Mavericks (1996–97) ===
On December 27, 1996, just 22 games into the season, he was traded along with Michael Finley, A.C. Green, and a second-round draft pick to the Dallas Mavericks in exchange for Jason Kidd, Tony Dumas, and Loren Meyer. Though Cassell had begun to develop chemistry with the Suns and Coach Ainge, team management felt they could not pass up the opportunity to trade for Kidd.

=== New Jersey Nets (1997–1999) ===
Midway through the 1996–97 season, after appearing in 16 games for the Mavericks, he was traded with Chris Gatling, Jim Jackson, George McCloud, and Eric Montross to the New Jersey Nets in exchange for Shawn Bradley, Ed O'Bannon, Robert Pack, and Khalid Reeves on February 17, 1997. The Nets would be the third team that Cassell played for just that season. During his time with the Nets, Cassell lived in Teaneck, New Jersey.

Following the season, though he considered an offer to return to Houston, Cassell elected to re-sign with the Nets on a six-year contract. Forming one of the league's most potent backcourts with Kerry Kittles, Cassell averaged 19.6 points, 8 assists and 1.6 steals in 34 minutes per game for the Nets that year, and helped lead them to the playoffs for their first time in four years. However, they were swept by Michael Jordan and the Bulls in the first round.

Led by coach John Calipari, who pushed the team to trade for then re-sign Cassell, the Nets were favorites in the Eastern conference entering the lockout-shortened 1998–99 season. However, Cassell sustained an injury in the first game of the season and the Nets started 3–15.

=== Milwaukee Bucks (1999–2003) ===
On March 11, 1999, Cassell was again traded in a three team, eight player trade that sent Stephon Marbury to the Nets, Terrell Brandon to Minnesota Timberwolves, and Cassell to the Milwaukee Bucks. Under their new coach George Karl, Cassell formed a "Big 3" with Ray Allen and Glenn Robinson. In the first game of the following season, on November 2, 1999, Cassell led all scorers with 35 points alongside 11 assists in a 98–93 victory against the Houston Rockets. On November 26, Cassell again led all scorers with 28 points, with 14 assists, this time in a 114–112 win over the Boston Celtics.

On March 3, 2001, he scored his career-high of 40 points against the Chicago Bulls. During All-Star Weekend in 2001, he won the Fleer Shootout at Jam Session on All-Star Saturday. That season, after defeating the Orlando Magic and Charlotte Hornets in the first two rounds of the playoffs, he almost reached the Finals with the Bucks, falling just short when they lost in Game 7 of the Eastern Conference Finals against the Philadelphia 76ers.

During the 2002–03 season, he passed 10,000 points for his career. On December 9, 2002, in one of the best games of his career, Cassell recorded a triple double with 39 points, 10 rebounds, and 10 assists in a double overtime 140–133 victory against the Cleveland Cavaliers.

On March 28, 2008, Cassell was honored as one of the 20 greatest players in Milwaukee Bucks history during the team's 40th Anniversary Celebration.

=== Minnesota Timberwolves (2003–2005) ===
After spending four seasons with the Bucks, he was traded along with Ervin Johnson to the Minnesota Timberwolves in exchange for Joe Smith and Anthony Peeler following the 2003 NBA draft. Cassell enjoyed his most successful season as an individual that year. He posted 19.8 points on 49% shooting, 7.3 assists and 1.3 steals in 35 minutes per game on the year. He was named to the All-NBA Second Team and voted into the 2004 NBA All-Star Game. Cassell, Latrell Sprewell and Kevin Garnett formed what was widely considered the best trio in the NBA that season, vaulting past Western Conference powerhouses the Sacramento Kings, Dallas Mavericks, San Antonio Spurs and Los Angeles Lakers for the number one seed in the Western Conference, with a franchise-best 58–24 record.

Cassell made his playoff debut with the Timberwolves scoring a franchise playoff record 40 points, in a first-round game 1 win against the Denver Nuggets. Minnesota would win the series in five games. They faced the Sacramento Kings in the next round, with Cassell again dropping 40 points in the series opener. A series of late-game heroics from Cassell helped the Timberwolves defeat the Kings in seven games. Cassell however sustained a back injury that limited him in the Western Conference Finals against the Lakers, which the Lakers would win in six games.

The following year, the Timberwolves finished 44–38, missing the playoffs by one game in the competitive Western Conference. Cassell, who appeared in only 59 games that season due to injuries, voiced his frustration over the midseason firing of Flip Saunders and not being offered a contract extension.

=== Los Angeles Clippers (2005–2008) ===
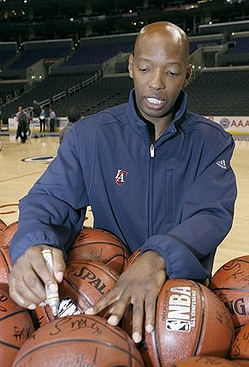
Cassell signing basketballs with the Clippers

After the 2004–05 season, the Timberwolves traded Cassell and a conditional first-round pick to the Los Angeles Clippers in exchange for Marko Jarić and Lionel Chalmers. The trade is widely considered among the NBA's most lopsided ever; Chalmers never played another game in the NBA, and Jaric was traded after three unproductive yet overpaid seasons. Cassell meanwhile led the Clippers to their then-most successful season, and the draft pick from Minnesota was used by the Clippers as part of the Chris Paul trade. The Timberwolves would not qualify for the postseason again until 2018.

Cassell appeared to have found a home with the Clippers, as he helped lead them back to the playoffs for the first time since 1997, with their best record in team history at 47–35. Since the team moved to California in 1978, they had compiled just three winning seasons. In the first round, they beat the Denver Nuggets in five games, but would fall to the Phoenix Suns in seven games in the Conference Semifinals. Between their move to California in 1978 and Chris Paul's arrival in 2011, this would be the only year that the Clippers won a playoff series.

Before the 2006–07 season, Cassell was reportedly offered a two-year, $15 million offer from the Atlanta Hawks, but eventually re-signed with the Clippers on a two-year, $13 million deal. Cassell struggled with injuries that season, and the Clippers missed the playoffs by two games.

With Elton Brand, Shaun Livingston, Chris Kaman and others suffering major injuries, the Clippers started rebuilding throughout the 2007–08 season. Although Cassell was initially reluctant to discuss leaving the Clippers, he eventually decided to listen to their buyout offers. On February 28, 2008, the Clippers reached a contractual buyout agreement with Cassell and placed him on waivers. According to the agreement, Cassell received half of his remaining salary, roughly $850,000.

=== Boston Celtics (2008–2009) ===
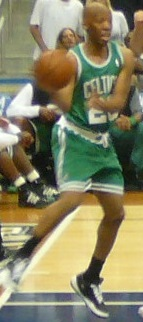
Cassell passes the ball in Game 4 of the 2008 NBA Playoffs against the Atlanta Hawks.

Cassell became an unrestricted free agent on March 3, 2008, when he cleared waivers, and was eligible to sign with a team of his choice. Although the Dallas Mavericks, Denver Nuggets and Phoenix Suns were interested in his services, he was strongly linked with a poised move to the Boston Celtics and was expected to be in Boston once he cleared waivers. On March 1, 2008, Cassell's agent, David Falk, confirmed that Cassell would sign a contract with the Celtics for the remainder of the season if he cleared waivers, receiving a prorated amount of the veteran minimum of $1.2M. Cassell said that he would wear either No. 28 or No. 91 on his jersey, and eventually chose No. 28.

According to his agent, Cassell had signed a contract with the Celtics on March 3, 2008, but the signing was pending an official league announcement. His arrival was delayed because of a death in his family. On March 4, 2008, Cassell officially signed with the Celtics, but immediately flew back to his hometown of Baltimore to attend funeral services for his deceased family member. He made his debut against the Philadelphia 76ers on March 10, 2008. In Boston, Cassell was reunited with former teammates Kevin Garnett and Ray Allen.

On March 17, 2008, Cassell had a standout performance in a Saint Patrick's Day matchup against the San Antonio Spurs, when he led the team from a 22-point deficit to a 2-point victory, scoring 17 points and hitting a clutch shot late in the game.

Cassell, along with Eddie House, James Posey, P.J. Brown, and Leon Powe, gave the Celtics arguably the best bench in the NBA that season. They helped the Celtics finish with an NBA-best 66–16 record en route to the NBA Finals. The Celtics defeated the Lakers 4–2, with the Celtics bench out-scoring the Lakers' in five of the six games. The win gave Cassell his third championship, which would also be the last game he played.

During the 2008–09 season, Cassell served as an unofficial assistant to head coach Doc Rivers; though he did not play in any games, he was still officially listed as an active player. On February 17, 2009, Cassell was traded to the Sacramento Kings for a conditional second-round draft pick in the 2015 NBA Draft. The move was done strictly for salary cap purposes and Cassell was not expected to play for the Kings. One day later, Sacramento waived him.

Cassell cleared waivers and was eligible to re-sign with Boston or another contender, but opted to sit out the remainder of the season, and he announced his retirement in May 2009. In 2015, Paul Pierce stated that he felt he, Garnett and Cassell were the real "Big 3" of the Celtics 2008 championship team.

== Coaching career ==
=== Washington Wizards (2009–2014) ===
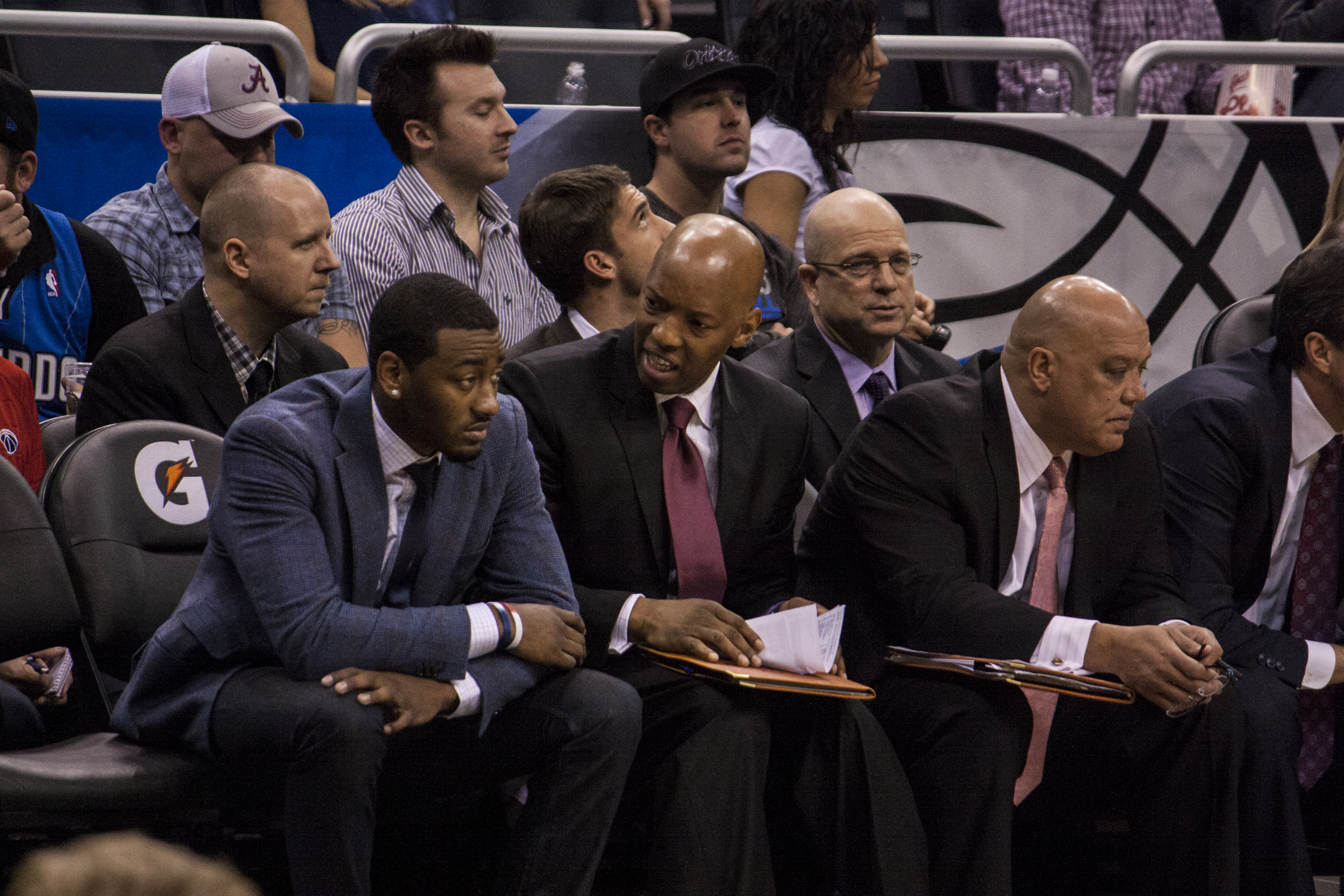
Cassell speaking with John Wall.

On May 21, 2009, Cassell was named assistant coach of the Washington Wizards, joining Flip Saunders who was his coach in Minnesota. John Wall, who was drafted first overall by the Wizards in 2010, credits Cassell for his development into one of the NBA's premier point guards and leadership during the team's Eastern Conference semi-finals appearance in 2014 – their first playoff series win since 2005. During the 2014 offseason, Cassell's former teammate Paul Pierce signed with the Wizards, and admitted he made the decision to sign with Washington after speaking with Cassell.

=== Los Angeles Clippers (2014–2020) ===
After five seasons with the Wizards, Cassell was hired by the Los Angeles Clippers on September 29, 2014, to join Doc Rivers' staff as assistant coach.

=== Philadelphia 76ers (2020–2023) ===
On November 9, 2020, the Philadelphia 76ers hired Cassell as an assistant coach under Doc Rivers.

=== Boston Celtics (2023–present) ===
On June 4, 2023, the Boston Celtics hired Cassell as an assistant coach under Joe Mazzulla. Cassell won his fourth NBA championship when the Celtics defeated the Dallas Mavericks in 5 games in the 2024 NBA Finals. It was Cassell's first championship as a coach.

== Media ==
Cassell appeared on TNT's NBA Fundamentals series, in which basketball players describe certain aspects of the game. He was chosen to illustrate the "mid-range game", i.e. shooting from the area around the free throw line, the paint, the wings and the baseline. In this clip, Cassell explains how to post up against opposing guards, shoot pull-up jump shots and hit buzzer beaters. He admires retired NBA players Terrell Brandon and Jeff Hornacek, two prolific mid-range shooters after whom he modeled his game.

== Personal life ==
His son, Sam Cassell Jr., played for Iona College. Cassell Jr. also played for and earned his associate's and bachelor's degrees from Chipola College and the University of Connecticut respectively. In 2017, Cassell Jr. was signed on the Summer League squad for Cleveland Cavaliers.

== NBA career statistics ==
Legend
GP	Games played	GS	Games started	MPG	Minutes per game
FG%	Field goal percentage	3P%	3-point field goal percentage	FT%	Free throw percentage
RPG	Rebounds per game	APG	Assists per game	SPG	Steals per game
BPG	Blocks per game	PPG	Points per game	**Bold**	Career high
†	Won an NBA championship	*	Led the league

=== Regular season ===
Year	Team	GP	GS	MPG	FG%	3P%	FT%	RPG	APG	SPG	BPG	PPG
1993–94†	Houston	66	6	17.0	.418	.295	.841	2.0	2.9	.9	.1	6.7
1994–95†	Houston	**82***	1	23.0	.427	.330	.843	2.6	4.9	1.1	.2	9.5
1995–96	Houston	61	0	27.6	.439	.348	.825	3.1	4.6	.9	.1	14.5
1996–97	Phoenix	22	9	24.5	.415	.306	.855	2.3	4.5	1.0	.3	14.8
1996–97	Dallas	16	13	24.9	.424	.306	.840	3.1	3.6	1.1	**.4**	12.3
1996–97	New Jersey	23	22	33.8	.443	.392	.831	3.6	6.5	**1.6**	.3	19.3
1997–98	New Jersey	75	72	34.7	.441	.188	.860	3.0	8.0	**1.6**	.3	19.6
1998–99	New Jersey	4	3	25.0	.429	.143	.935	1.5	4.8	.8	.0	18.0
1998–99	Milwaukee	4	0	24.8	.409	.333	**.947**	2.3	4.3	1.5	.0	13.8
1999–00	Milwaukee	81	**81**	**35.8**	.466	.289	.876	3.7	**9.0**	1.3	.1	18.6
2000–01	Milwaukee	76	75	35.6	.474	.306	.858	3.9	7.6	1.2	.1	18.2
2001–02	Milwaukee	74	73	35.2	.463	.348	.860	4.2	6.7	1.2	.2	19.7
2002–03	Milwaukee	78	77	34.6	.470	.362	.861	**4.4**	5.8	1.1	.2	19.7
2003–04	Minnesota	81	**81**	35.0	**.488**	.398	.873	3.3	7.3	1.3	.2	**19.8**
2004–05	Minnesota	59	38	25.8	.464	.262	.865	2.7	5.1	.6	.2	13.5
2005–06	L.A. Clippers	78	75	34.0	.443	.368	.863	3.7	6.3	.9	.1	17.2
2006–07	L.A. Clippers	58	30	24.3	.418	.294	.879	2.9	4.7	.5	.1	12.3
2007–08†	L.A. Clippers	38	33	25.7	.455	.259	.891	2.8	4.7	.7	.1	12.8
2007–08†	Boston	17	1	17.6	.385	**.409**	.840	1.8	2.1	.5	.2	7.6
Career		993	690	30.0	.454	.331	.861	3.2	6.0	1.1	.2	15.7
All-Star		1	0	13.0	.667	.000	.000	1.0	7.0	1.0	.0	4.0

=== Playoffs ===
Year	Team	GP	GS	MPG	FG%	3P%	FT%	RPG	APG	SPG	BPG	PPG
1994†	Houston	**22**	0	21.7	.394	.378	865	2.7	4.2	1.0	.2	9.4
1995†	Houston	**22**	0	22.0	.438	.400	.835	1.9	4.0	1.0	.1	11.0
1996	Houston	8	0	25.8	.321	.276	.793	2.1	4.3	.8	.1	10.4
1998	New Jersey	3	1	8.7	.333	—	—	1.0	1.7	.0	**.3**	2.0
1999	Milwaukee	3	3	34.0	**.500**	.000	.875	2.0	8.7	1.0	.0	15.3
2000	Milwaukee	5	5	35.6	.417	.200	.857	3.4	**9.0**	.8	.0	15.8
2001	Milwaukee	18	**18**	**37.9**	.396	.333	.866	**4.6**	6.7	**1.1**	.2	17.4
2003	Milwaukee	6	6	36.2	.470	**.524**	**.933**	3.2	2.7	.5	.2	17.2
2004	Minnesota	16	15	31.1	.465	.417	.852	2.5	4.4	.8	.2	16.6
2006	L.A. Clippers	12	12	33.7	.437	.349	.809	4.0	5.8	.7	.2	**18.0**
2008†	Boston	21	0	12.6	.333	.214	.824	.7	1.2	.4	.0	4.5
Career		136	60	26.0	.414	.363	.847	2.6	4.4	.8	.1	12.2

== See also ==
- List of NBA career assists leaders
