= Jason Kidd =

American basketball player and coach (born 1973)

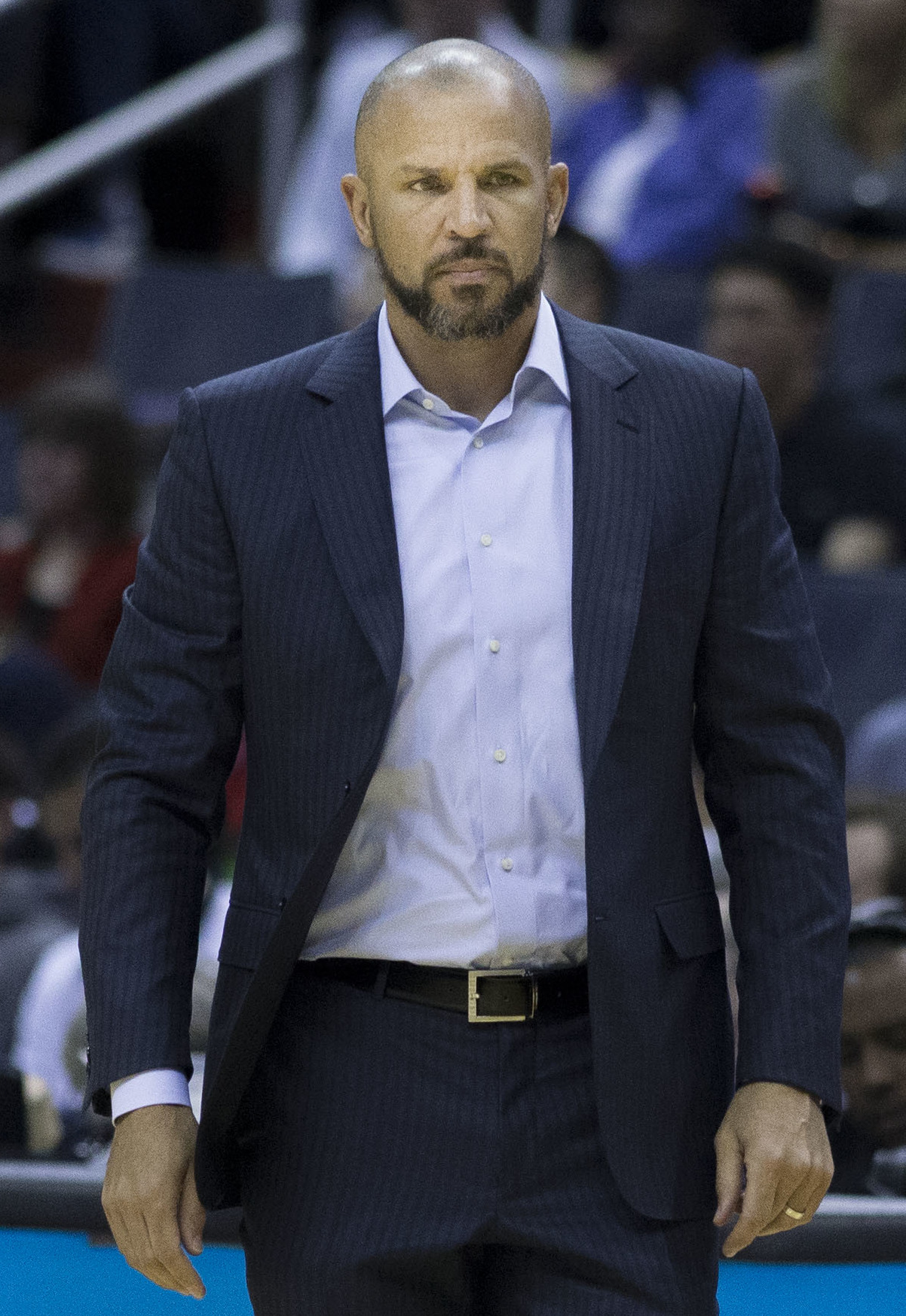
- Kidd in 2014

Personal information
- Born: March 23, 1973 (age 53) San Francisco, California, U.S.
- Listed height: 6 ft 4 in (1.93 m)
- Listed weight: 210 lb (95 kg)

Career information
- High school: St. Joseph Notre Dame (Alameda, California)
- College: California (1992–1994)
- NBA draft: 1994: 1st round, 2nd overall pick
- Drafted by: Dallas Mavericks
- Playing career: 1994–2013
- Position: Point guard
- Number: 5, 32, 2
- Coaching career: 2013–2026

Career history

Playing
- 1994–1996: Dallas Mavericks
- 1996–2001: Phoenix Suns
- 2001–2008: New Jersey Nets
- 2008–2012: Dallas Mavericks
- 2012–2013: New York Knicks

Coaching
- 2013–2014: Brooklyn Nets
- 2014–2018: Milwaukee Bucks
- 2019–2021: Los Angeles Lakers (assistant)
- 2021–2026: Dallas Mavericks

Career highlights
- As player: NBA champion (2011); 10× NBA All-Star (1996, 1998, 2000–2004, 2007, 2008, 2010); 5× All-NBA First Team (1999–2002, 2004); All-NBA Second Team (2003); 4× NBA All-Defensive First Team (1999, 2001, 2002, 2006); 5× NBA All-Defensive Second Team (2000, 2003–2005, 2007); NBA Rookie of the Year (1995); NBA All-Rookie First Team (1995); 5× NBA assists leader (1999–2001, 2003, 2004); USA Basketball Male Athlete of the Year (2007); NBA 75th Anniversary Team; No. 5 retired by Brooklyn Nets; Consensus first-team All-American (1994); USBWA National Freshman of the Year (1993); NCAA assists leader (1994); NCAA steals leader (1993); Pac-10 Player of the Year (1994); Pac-10 Freshman of the Year (1993); No. 5 retired by California Golden Bears; National high school player of the year (1992); McDonald's All-American (1992); 2× First-team Parade All-American (1991, 1992); 2× California Mr. Basketball (1991, 1992); As assistant coach: NBA champion (2020)

Career NBA statistics
- Points: 17,529 (12.6 ppg)
- Rebounds: 8,725 (6.3 rpg)
- Assists: 12,091 (8.7 apg)
- Stats at NBA.com
- Stats at Basketball Reference
- Basketball Hall of Fame
Medals
Men's basketball
Representing the United States
Olympic Games
Gold medal – first place	2000 Sydney	Team
Gold medal – first place	2008 Beijing	Team
FIBA Americas Championship
Gold medal – first place	1999 San Juan
Gold medal – first place	2003 San Juan
Gold medal – first place	2007 Las Vegas

Jason Frederick Kidd (born March 23, 1973) is an American former professional basketball player and coach. Widely regarded as one of the greatest point guards of all time, Kidd was a 10-time NBA All-Star, a six-time All-NBA Team member, and a nine-time NBA All-Defensive Team member. He won an NBA championship in 2011 as a member of the Dallas Mavericks and was a two-time gold medal winner in the Olympics with the U.S. national team in 2000 and 2008. He has been inducted into the Naismith Memorial Basketball Hall of Fame twice: in 2018 for his individual career, and in 2025 as a member of the Redeem Team. In 2021, Kidd was honored as one of the league's greatest players by being named to the NBA 75th Anniversary Team.

Kidd played college basketball for the California Golden Bears and was selected by the Dallas Mavericks in the first round of the 1994 NBA draft as the second overall pick. He was named co-NBA Rookie of the Year in his first season with the Mavericks, along with Grant Hill. Then, from 1996 to 2001, Kidd played for the Phoenix Suns and later for the New Jersey Nets from 2001 to 2008. He led the Nets to two consecutive NBA Finals appearances in 2002 and 2003. In the middle of the 2007–08 season, Kidd was traded back to Dallas. At age 38, Kidd won his only NBA championship when Dallas defeated the Miami Heat in the 2011 NBA Finals. He finished his playing career in 2013 with the New York Knicks.

Kidd's ability to pass and rebound made him a regular triple-double threat. Upon his retirement, he ranked third in NBA history for career regular season triple-doubles with 107 and third in career playoff triple-doubles with 11. As of 2025, he ranks third on both the NBA all-time list in career assists and the NBA all-time list in career steals.

In June 2013, Kidd was hired as the head coach of the Nets, who had relocated from New Jersey to Brooklyn. After one season, he was traded to the Milwaukee Bucks, where he coached for four seasons until he was fired mid-season in 2018. After a season off, he was an assistant coach for the Los Angeles Lakers, with whom he won an NBA championship in 2020; he reunited with the Mavericks organization in 2021 to become the franchise's head coach, reaching the Western Conference finals in his first season and reaching the 2024 NBA Finals in his third season. He and the Mavericks mutually parted ways in 2026.

== Early life ==
Kidd was born in San Francisco and raised in Oakland. Kidd is biracial; his father, Steve Kidd, is African-American, and his mother, Anne Kidd, is Irish-American. As a youth, Kidd was highly scouted for AAU teams and tourneys, garnering various all-star and MVP awards. He attended the East Oakland Youth Development Center and frequented the city courts of Oakland, where he often found himself pitted against future Basketball Hall of Famer Gary Payton.

Raised Catholic, Kidd attended St. Joseph Notre Dame High School in Alameda. Under the guidance of coach Frank LaPorte, Kidd led the Pilots to consecutive state championships, averaging 25 points, 10 assists, 7 rebounds and 7 steals his senior season. During that year, he also received a host of individual honors, including the Naismith Award as the nation's top high school player, and was named Player of the Year by Parade as well as USA Today. The all-time prep leader in assists (1,155) and the state's seventh-highest career scorer (2,661 points), Kidd was voted California Player of the Year for the second time and also a McDonald's All-American. On January 31, 2012, Kidd was honored as one of the 35 Greatest McDonald's All Americans.

After a highly publicized recruiting process, Kidd shocked many fans and pundits alike by choosing to attend the nearby University of California, Berkeley—a school that was coming off a 10–18 season and had not won a conference title since 1960—over a number of top-ranked collegiate programs including the University of Arizona, University of Kentucky, University of Kansas, and Ohio State University.

== College career ==
In his first year playing for the Golden Bears, Kidd averaged 13.0 points, 7.7 assists, 4.9 rebounds, and 3.8 steals per game which earned him national Freshman of the Year honors and a spot on the All-Pac-10 team. His 110 steals set an NCAA record for most steals by a freshman and set a school record for most steals in a season, while his 220 assists that season was also a school record. His play was also a key factor in the resurgence of Cal basketball and helped the Golden Bears earn an NCAA Tournament bid, where they upset two-time defending national champion Duke in the second round of that tournament before losing to Kansas in the Sweet 16.

Kidd continued his success as a sophomore, tallying averages of 16.7 points, 6.9 rebounds, 3.1 steals and 9.1 assists, breaking his previous school record for most assists in a season with 272, while also leading the nation in that category. He was also selected a First Team All-American, the first Cal player to be so named since 1968, as well as Pac-10 Player of the Year, becoming the first sophomore to receive that honor. The Golden Bears made the NCAA Tournament again as a fifth seed, but was upset in the first round by Dick Bennett's Wisconsin–Green Bay team 61–57. Kidd was also named a finalist for both the Naismith and Wooden Awards as college basketball's top player and subsequently opted to enter the NBA draft in 1994. In 2004, Cal retired Kidd's number 5 jersey.

== Professional career ==
=== Dallas Mavericks (1994–1996) ===
==== 1994–1995: Co-Rookie of the Year and instant impact ====
Kidd was selected as the second overall pick by the Dallas Mavericks, behind Glenn Robinson of Purdue, and just ahead of Duke's Grant Hill. In his first year, he averaged 11.7 points, 5.4 rebounds, and 7.7 assists, and led the NBA in triple doubles, sharing 1995 NBA Rookie of the Year honors with Hill of the Detroit Pistons. The year before the Mavericks drafted Kidd, they finished the season with the worst record in the NBA at 13–69. After Kidd's first season with the Mavericks, their record improved to 36–46 which, at 23 games, was the largest improvement in the NBA.

==== 1995–1996: First All-Star appearance and "Three J's" ====
In the following season Kidd was voted a starter in the 1996 All-Star Game. In his first two years with the Mavericks, the move most people associated him with was "the baseball pass". Kidd was a member of the "Three J's" in Dallas along with Jim Jackson and Jamal Mashburn. After promising beginnings, things turned sour among the trio. Mashburn's injury combined with deteriorated personal relations between the immature leaders of the team resulted in the Mavericks taking a step backwards instead of further development. Kidd's continued problems with the coaches affected the Mavericks' decision to trade their young star just in his third season in the league.

=== Phoenix Suns (1996–2001) ===
==== 1996–1998: First playoff appearances ====
Kidd was traded to the Phoenix Suns with Tony Dumas and Loren Meyer for Michael Finley, A.C. Green, and Sam Cassell during the 1996–97 season. In his first full season with the Suns in 1997–98, the team's win total improved by 16 games. The Suns, who finished the season with a 56–26 record, had been recognized for their fast-paced style of play with Kidd frequently leading a small lineup of four guards (Kidd, Kevin Johnson, Rex Chapman and Steve Nash) being on the floor at the same time together with Antonio McDyess playing at center. In the playoffs, Phoenix was eliminated in the first round by the San Antonio Spurs led by their Twin Towers duo, David Robinson and Tim Duncan.

==== 1998–2001: First All-NBA selections and leading the NBA in assists ====
In the 1998–99 season, Kidd averaged 10.8 assists per game to dethrone Washington's Rod Strickland as the league's assists leader. He also led the NBA with seven triple-doubles (the rest of the league had just 11) and was second in the NBA with 41.2 minutes per game (behind Allen Iverson's 41.5 mpg). Kidd averaged career highs in points (16.9 ppg), field goal percentage (.444), rebounds (6.8 rpg, best among NBA guards) and steals (2.28 spg, fourth in the NBA) and was the only player to be ranked among the top 50 in the NBA in 10 different statistical categories. The Suns won all seven of the games in which he had triple-doubles.

The Suns acquired Penny Hardaway from the Orlando Magic before the start of the 1999–00 season in hope of creating the best backcourt duo in the league. The combination of Kidd and Hardaway in the starting lineup was often labeled as the BackCourt 2000. Despite a decent 53–29 record, the Suns' season was spoiled by injuries to both of their superstars. Kidd, who broke his ankle late in the regular season, returned during the playoffs to help his team to beat the defending champion San Antonio Spurs and advance to the second round for the first time in his career. The Spurs were missing Tim Duncan because he injured his meniscus shortly before the end of the regular season and was unable to play in the playoffs.

The 2000–01 season was affected by Kidd's personal problems as he was charged with domestic abuse of his wife. The Suns, who struggled in the middle part of the season, finished strongly with a 15–6 record to secure another 50-win season. Kidd took on more of the offensive load after his teammates encouraged him to be more selfish. He recorded 30-plus points six times on the year and five times in the last 19 games. In one particular hot stretch, he scored 36, 32, and 31 in three consecutive games in mid-March, prior to which he had never recorded consecutive 30-point games.

During his stay in Phoenix, Kidd made the All-Star Game in 1998, 2000, and 2001 (in 1999 it was not held because of a lockout) and led the NBA in assists for three consecutive years (1999–2001). It was also with the Suns that Kidd rose to the status of the league's best playmaker as he was voted to the All-NBA First Team and NBA All-Defensive Team three years in a row (1999–2001).

=== New Jersey Nets (2001–2008) ===
==== 2001–2003: MVP runner-up and NBA Finals appearances ====
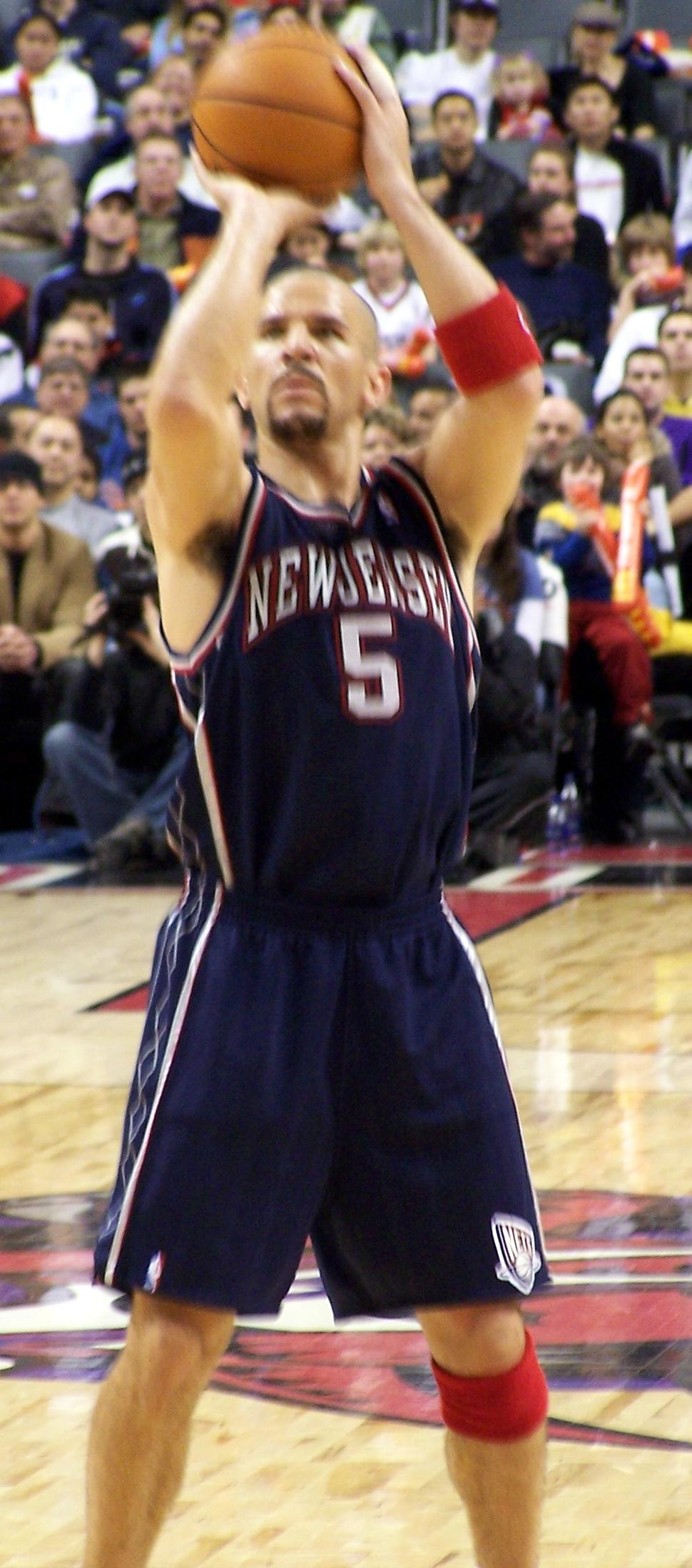
Kidd with the Nets in 2006

On June 28, 2001, after five seasons in Phoenix in which the team made the playoffs each year, Kidd was traded, along with Chris Dudley, to the New Jersey Nets for Stephon Marbury, Johnny Newman, and Soumaila Samake. Kidd joined the franchise as the team was constructed around a sophomore Kenyon Martin, veterans Kerry Kittles and Keith Van Horn, along with rookies Richard Jefferson, Jason Collins, and Brandon Armstrong coming from the draft-day trade for the seventh pick Eddie Griffin. The 2001–02 season saw Kidd lead the Nets to a 52–30 finish, a 26-game improvement from the season before and the first 50-win season in the franchise's NBA history. He was voted to the All-NBA First Team and finished second to the Spurs' Tim Duncan in MVP voting.

Under Kidd's guidance, the young Nets team prospered through the playoffs, won the Eastern Conference title and advanced to the franchise's first-ever appearance in the NBA Finals. Along the way, they had some memorable moments including a double overtime victory against the Indiana Pacers in the decisive game 5. Indiana's Reggie Miller forced the first overtime with a 35-foot three-pointer at the buzzer and the second one with a two-handed dunk, but the Nets eventually survived and beat Indiana 120–109. Kidd scored 20 of his then playoffs-best 31 points in the fourth quarter and overtimes. After defeating the Charlotte Hornets 4–1 in the second round, the Nets then faced the Boston Celtics in the conference finals. In that series Kidd and the Nets experienced the biggest fourth quarter collapse in the playoffs' history, when the Celtics came back from a 21-point deficit to win the pivotal game 3, taking a 2–1 series lead. However, the Nets then won three consecutive games, while Kidd averaged a triple double for the entire series. In the NBA Finals, the Nets were swept in four games by Shaquille O'Neal and Kobe Bryant's Los Angeles Lakers.

New Jersey enjoyed another stellar season under Kidd's leadership in the 2002–03 season, during which the team finished 49–33 and reached the NBA Finals once again. Kidd had his highest scoring season with 18.7 points per game and led the league in assists with 8.9 per game. This time Kidd was selected to the All-NBA Second Team. In the playoffs after splitting the first four games with the Milwaukee Bucks, the Nets recorded a 10-game winning streak, while sweeping the Celtics and the Detroit Pistons on the way to their second consecutive NBA Finals. In the Finals, New Jersey lost to Tim Duncan's San Antonio Spurs in six games, even though the series was tied after the first four games.

==== 2003–2006: Coming up short, injury and surgery ====
As an unrestricted free agent in the 2003 offseason, there was speculation that Kidd would join the defending champion Spurs and replace Tony Parker as their starting point guard. Parker, then young and unproven, was perceived to have "limitations" in his game that Kidd did not. However, Kidd decided to stay with the Nets on a 6-year, $99 million deal. In the 2003–04 season, Kidd averaged 15.5 points, 6.4 rebounds, and 9.2 assists (leading the league in assists for the second year in a row). The Nets led by Kidd finished the season 47–35 as their leader was voted to the All-NBA First Team for the fifth time in his career. In the playoffs however, they lost in the conference semifinals in a seven-game series against the Detroit Pistons, the eventual champions. Kidd went scoreless in the decisive game 7 while playing with a serious knee injury.

On July 1, 2004, Kidd underwent microfracture surgery to repair a damaged knee. He made a full recovery and returned to the court for the 2004–05 season in December, during which the Nets acquired star swingman Vince Carter from the Toronto Raptors. With the Nets hanging on the prospect of missing the playoffs for the first time since 2001 and with Jefferson injured, Carter and Kidd combined to fuel the team to a late regular season surge that enabled them to inch past the Cleveland Cavaliers for the eighth and final playoff berth in the East. The Nets were eliminated in four games by the top-seeded Miami Heat in the first round.

In the 2005–06 season, Kidd averaged 13.3 points, 7.3 rebounds, and 8.4 assists. He and Carter led the Nets to a third-place finish in the East with a 49–33 record to clinch their fourth Atlantic Division title in the last five seasons. In April the Nets recorded NBA season-best winning streak, which was ended by the Cleveland Cavaliers at 14 wins in a row. Kidd was named to the NBA All-Defensive First Team for the fourth time in his career. In the playoffs the Nets beat the Indiana Pacers in six games in the first round, but later in the conference semifinals they were defeated again by the Miami Heat, the eventual champions.

==== 2006–2008: Triple-double postseason and final year in New Jersey ====
Kidd was named a reserve for the NBA All-Star game along with teammate Vince Carter during the 2006–07 season. However, Kidd missed the game because of a strained back and was replaced on the roster by Joe Johnson. On April 7, 2007, Kidd and Carter became the first teammates to record triple-doubles in the same game since Michael Jordan and Scottie Pippen did it in 1989 for the Chicago Bulls. In the first round of the 2006–07 postseason Kidd averaged 14.0 points, 13.2 assists, 10.0 rebounds, and 2.0 steals, as the Nets defeated the Toronto Raptors in six games. He joined Wilt Chamberlain and Magic Johnson as the only players in NBA history to average a triple-double in multiple playoff series. For the postseason, Kidd averaged 14.6 points, 10.9 assists and 10.9 rebounds in twelve playoff games. He became the second player in NBA history to average a triple-double for an entire postseason. Despite Kidd's efforts the Nets were eliminated in six games in the Eastern Conference semifinals by the Cleveland Cavaliers.

In the 2007–08 season, Kidd became the third player to get a triple-double in three straight games since 1989. He did so after he logged his 97th career triple-double in a 115–99 loss to the Charlotte Bobcats. Kidd was voted by the fans to start in the 2008 All-Star game in New Orleans as a guard along with Dwyane Wade. During that season Kidd had been mentioned in trade rumors, notably to the Los Angeles Lakers, but the deal fell through when the Lakers refused to give up their young center Andrew Bynum. On January 28, 2008, Kidd revealed that his agent had been talking to the Nets' front office about a trade. On February 19, 2008, Kidd was traded to the Dallas Mavericks, the team that originally drafted him.

=== Return to Dallas (2008–2012) ===
==== 2008–2010: Final All-Star appearances and playoff upsets ====
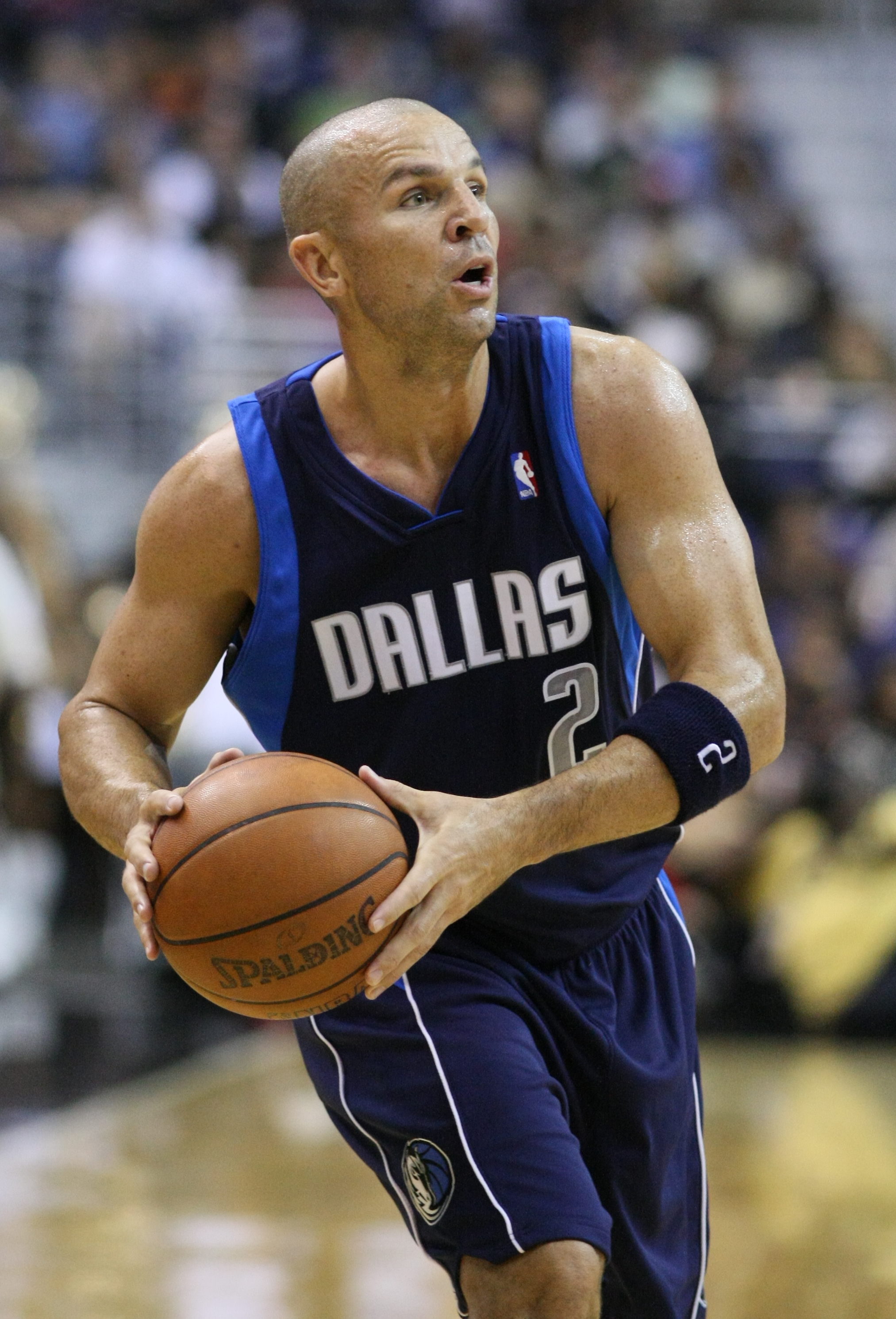
Kidd during his second tenure as a Maverick

On February 13, 2008, the Dallas Mavericks and New Jersey Nets reached an agreement on a trade to send Kidd and Malik Allen to Dallas for Devin Harris, Devean George, Jerry Stackhouse, DeSagana Diop, Maurice Ager, two first-round drafts picks (in 2008 and 2010), and $3 million, but the trade fell through when George invoked his (Early) Bird rights, as was stipulated in his contract at the time. The trade was retooled, with Trenton Hassell replacing George, and Keith Van Horn, who had agreed to come out of retirement, replacing Stackhouse, because NBA officials informed the Mavericks that if Stackhouse were to be included in the deal, he could not re-sign with the team if the Nets chose to buy out his contract. Antoine Wright was also added to the retooled trade proposal (the two teams originally agreed on a separate deal that would have sent Wright to the Mavericks for a 2008 second-round pick, but were ultimately able include him in the Kidd deal). On February 19, 2008, Kidd was traded to the Mavericks along with Allen and Wright for Van Horn (via a sign and trade deal), Harris, Diop, Hassell, Ager, $3 million, and first round picks in 2008 and 2010.

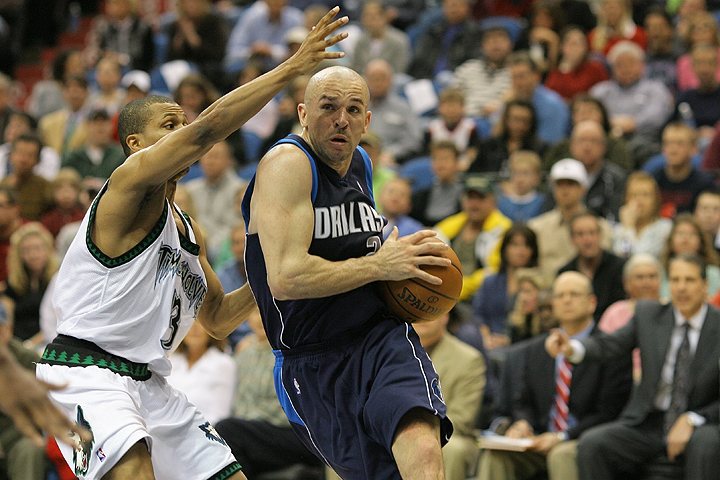
Kidd drives to the basket in 2008

The Mavericks hoped that Kidd would provide leadership to the team that for years had been labelled as weak mentally and help Dallas and its franchise-player Dirk Nowitzki win their first ever NBA championship. The Mavericks made a strong playoff push following the trade, but despite a 51–31 record, they were only able to secure the seventh seed in the highly competitive Western Conference. In the playoffs, they faced Chris Paul's New Orleans Hornets, and were eliminated in five games in the first round.

The following 2008–09 season saw Kidd and the Mavericks stumble out to a rocky start, losing eight out of the first 15 games; however, the team finished the season strong to earn the sixth seed in the playoffs with a 50–32 record. Kidd finished the season ranked third in the league in steals with 2.0 per game, his best average in six years. In the playoffs, the Mavericks upset the San Antonio Spurs, with Kidd leading the team in assists in all but one game; the Mavericks reached the conference semifinals for the first time since 2006. Kidd's season ended there as the Mavs lost to the Denver Nuggets in five games.

On July 5, 2009, Kidd verbally committed to re-signing with the Mavericks after being pursued heavily by the New York Knicks. The three-year deal reportedly was worth more than $25 million, all of it fully guaranteed. In the first year of Kidd's new contract in the 2009–10 season the Mavericks finished second in the Western Conference with a 55–27 record during the regular season. However, the season ended with another disappointment as the Mavericks lost in six games to the San Antonio Spurs in the first round of the 2010 NBA playoffs. It was rumored that Kidd had gone through a flu just before the series began which might have affected his physical condition. He did not speak to reporters after Games 5 and 6 and skipped the team's final meeting.

==== 2010–2012: NBA championship and Sportsmanship Award ====
Kidd won the NBA championship with the Dallas Mavericks on June 12, 2011, defeating NBA All-Stars LeBron James, Dwyane Wade, and Chris Bosh and the Miami Heat. After appearing and losing in two different NBA Finals, it was the first and only championship in his career. Despite a mid-season injury to Dirk Nowitzki, and a season-ending surgery to their starting small forward Caron Butler, the 2010–11 season turned out to be the best for the Mavs in Kidd's era as they finished the regular season with a 57–25 record. On February 4, Kidd hit a three-pointer with 2.5 seconds remaining in the fourth quarter to give the Mavs a win in Boston over the Celtics, extending their winning streak to seven games.

Kidd sparked the Mavericks' impressive run with a total of 42 points in the first two playoff games against the Portland Trail Blazers. Dallas won the series 4–2. The Mavs then swept the two-time defending champion Los Angeles Lakers, with Kidd successfully guarding Kobe Bryant in decisive moments of close games 1 and 3. In the Western Conference finals against the Oklahoma City Thunder, Kidd was partly responsible for guarding young and athletic superstars Kevin Durant and Russell Westbrook. Kidd hit a tie-breaking three-pointer late in overtime in a game 4 victory at Oklahoma City to give his team a 3–1 lead. Dallas defeated Oklahoma in five games. In the NBA Finals, the Mavericks defeated the Miami Heat in six games, despite trailing the Heat two games to one at one point. At various points, Kidd was called upon to defend superstars Dwyane Wade and LeBron James. Kidd averaged 9.3 points, 7.3 assists, 4.5 rebounds, and 1.9 steals per game during the Mavericks' 21-game championship run. At 38 years of age, he became the oldest starting point guard ever to lead his team to the championship.

Shortened by a lockout, the 2011–12 season turned out to be the last for Kidd in the Mavericks uniform. With 39-year-old Kidd averaging career lows in minutes, points and assists for the regular season, the defending champions were swept by the Oklahoma City Thunder in the first round of the 2012 NBA playoffs. On May 3, 2012, Kidd won his first NBA Sportsmanship Award.

=== New York Knicks (2012–2013) ===
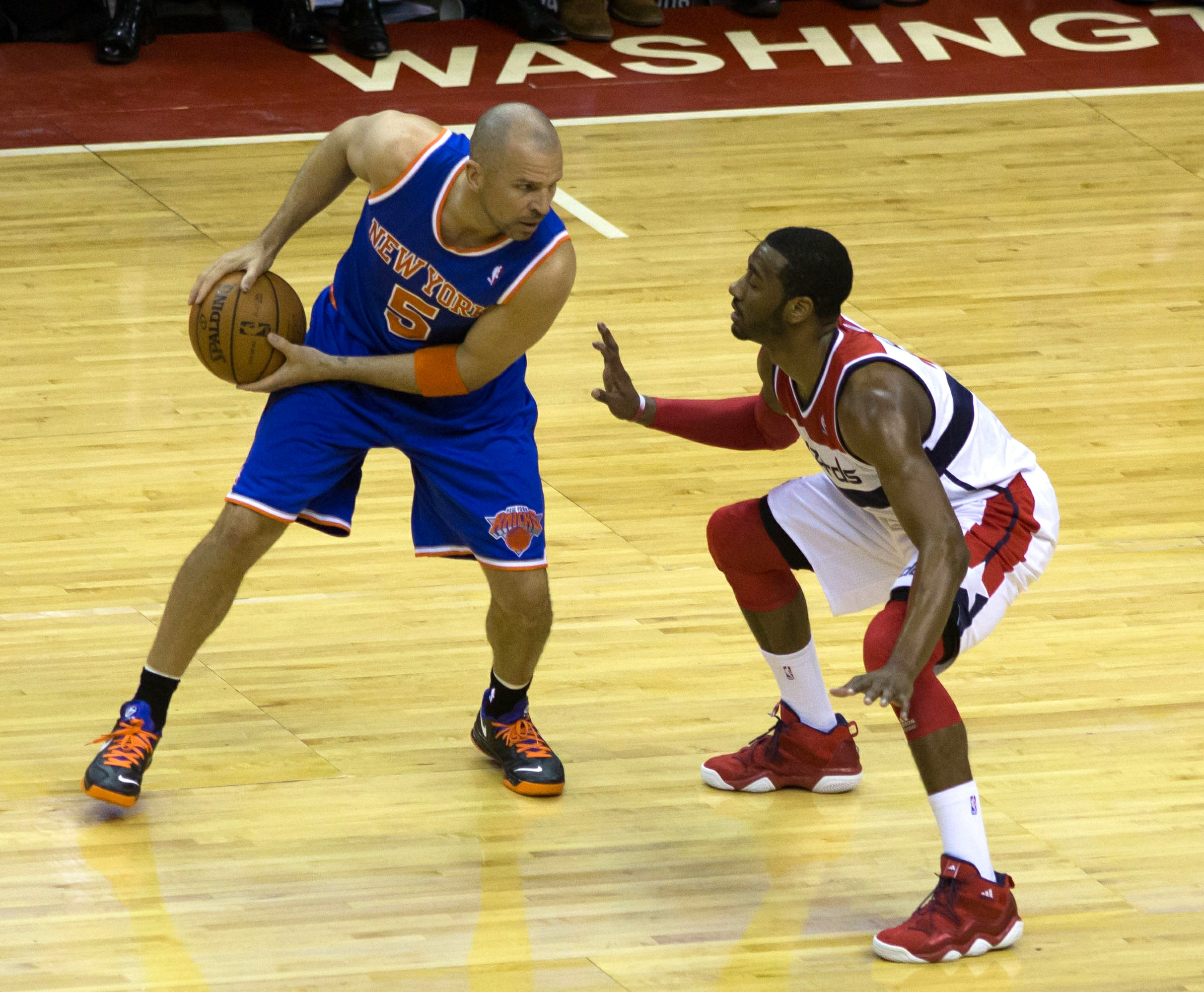
Kidd as a Knick guarded by Washington's John Wall

On July 12, 2012, Kidd signed with the New York Knicks. After making a verbal commitment to re-sign with the Mavericks, Kidd changed his mind and decided to sign a 3-year deal with the Knicks. Kidd was expected to act as a mentor to Jeremy Lin but after Lin left to the Houston Rockets, it was assumed that Kidd would serve as a backup to Raymond Felton at the point guard position. During the preseason however, the Knicks head coach Mike Woodson decided to start the season with both playmakers in the starting lineup and Kidd adjusting more to the shooting guard role.

With the new backcourt duo in the lineup, the Knicks opened the 2012–13 season with an 18–5 record while Kidd averaged 9.0 points per game on 44 percent three-point shooting in the first two months of the season. Nearly 40 years old, Kidd was asked to play almost 33 minutes per game in December. New York finished the season with 54 wins, an 18-game jump from the previous season. It was their first 50-win season since 1999–2000. The Knicks advanced to the second round of the playoffs, but lost to the Indiana Pacers in six games. Kidd struggled during the playoffs, when he was held without a field goal in his last 10 playoff games. It was believed that overworking Kidd during the regular season had strongly affected his performance in the second half of the season and left him burned out for the playoffs. Kidd retired on June 3, 2013, after one season with the Knicks and 19 seasons in the NBA. His announcement came two days after 1995 co-Rookie of the Year Grant Hill retired.

== Coaching career ==
=== Brooklyn Nets (2013–2014) ===
On June 12, 2013, Kidd was named head coach of the Brooklyn Nets, replacing interim coach P. J. Carlesimo. He is the third person since the ABA–NBA merger to debut as an NBA head coach the season after he retired as a player. (Note: The other coaches to do this were Mike Dunleavy, Sr. (after 1990–91 with the Los Angeles Lakers) and Paul Silas (after 1980–81 with the San Diego Clippers).) In September 2013, Kidd bought a minority ownership stake in the team (from Jay-Z).

On October 17, 2013, the Nets retired and raised his number 5 jersey to the rafters before a preseason game against the Miami Heat.

Kidd was suspended for the first two games of the season after pleading guilty to a misdemeanor DWI charge stemming from an incident in July 2012. Joe Prunty served as acting head coach for the team's season opener in Cleveland and their home opener against Miami. He made his debut as head coach on November 3 in a loss to the Orlando Magic. On November 5, Kidd had his first victory as head coach in a 104–88 win over the Utah Jazz. On November 28, Kidd was fined $50,000 by the NBA for instructing his player Tyshawn Taylor to bump into him and intentionally spilling a cup of soda on the court in order to stop the game so his team could draw up a last-second offensive play against the Lakers.

After a loss to the Chicago Bulls on Christmas Day, the Nets dropped to a disappointing 9–19 record. Many critics started to question Kidd's ability to manage a group of veterans that included Kevin Garnett, Paul Pierce, and Joe Johnson and there even appeared to be rumors that Kidd might be on his way out before the end of the season. However, the Nets were able to turn things around at the beginning of 2014 and finished the season with a 44–38 record, while Kidd began to get recognition for his coaching skills.

On February 3, 2014, Kidd was named the Eastern Conference Coach of the Month for January. On April 1, 2014, he was named Eastern Conference Coach of the Month a second time for March. He became the fourth coach overall to win both Player of the Month and Coach of the Month honors. He also became the second coach, after Jeff Hornacek of the Phoenix Suns, to win both honors with the same team.

In the first round of the 2014 NBA playoffs, the Brooklyn Nets eliminated the Toronto Raptors in a 7-game series. Kidd is the 19th rookie head coach in the league's history to coach his team in a decisive game 7 on the road, and became the first one to win it. In the semifinals, the Nets faced the Miami Heat and lost the series 4–1.

=== Milwaukee Bucks (2014–2018) ===
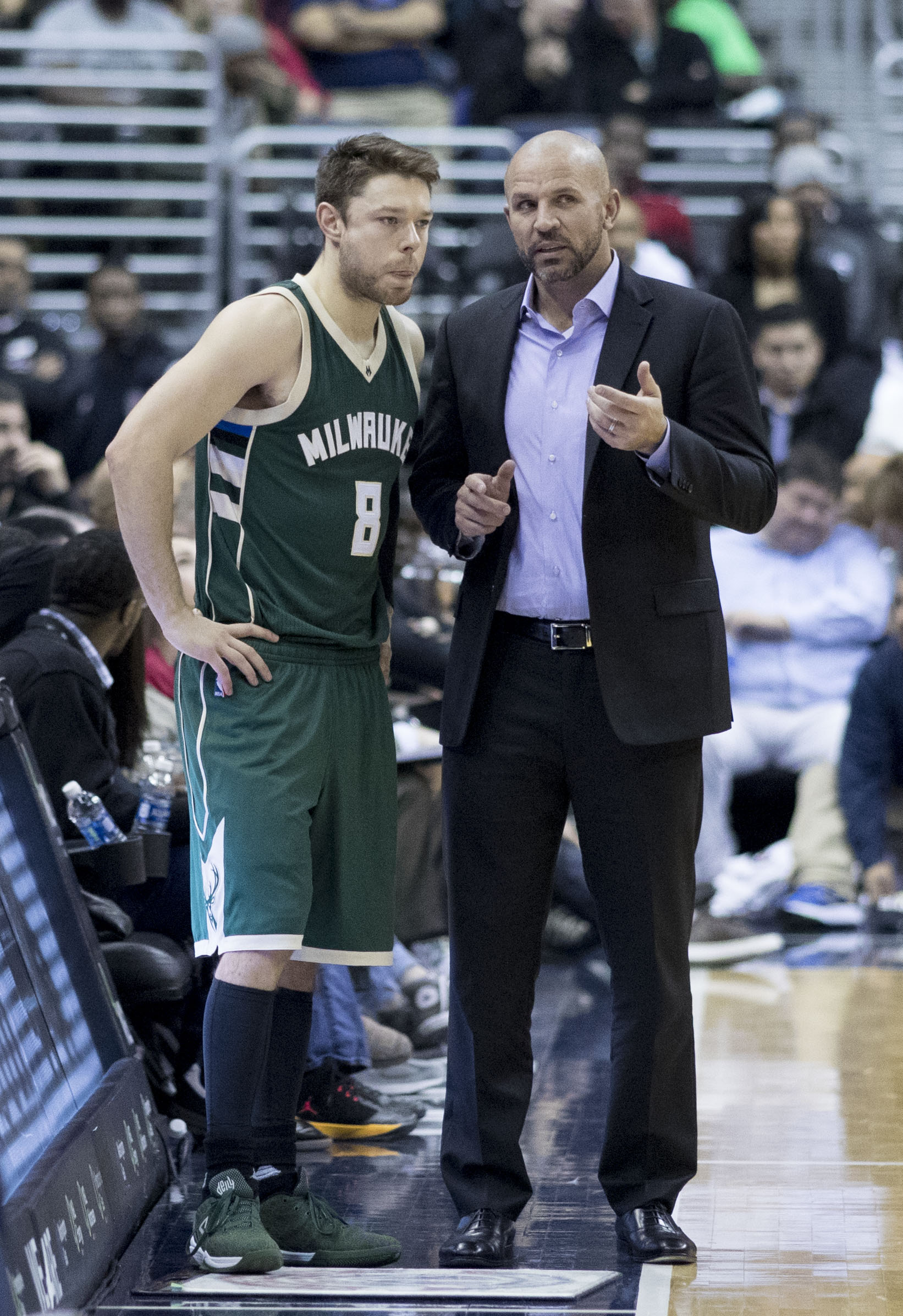
Kidd giving instructions to Matthew Dellavedova during his tenure as Bucks coach

On July 1, 2014, the Milwaukee Bucks secured Kidd's coaching rights from the Brooklyn Nets in exchange for two second-round draft picks in 2015 and 2019. The move did not come without controversy, as it was reported that Kidd had been seeking more management power over the Nets' general manager Billy King and after being denied began talks with the Bucks even though they still had a coach under contract in Larry Drew. He later stated that he felt the Nets truly did not want him nor were they committed to building a contender. In his return to Brooklyn on November 19, 2014, he was greeted with heavy boos and jeers.

The Bucks were one of the biggest surprises of the 2014–15 season. Under Kidd's guidance, the young team improved from franchise-worst 15 wins in the previous season, finishing with a 41–41 record to advance to the playoffs as the 6th seed in the Eastern Conference. Milwaukee achieved that feat despite losing their 2nd draft pick overall Jabari Parker in December to a knee injury and trading star guard Brandon Knight to the Phoenix Suns in February. Kidd is the first coach in NBA history to lead two franchises to the playoffs in his first two years as a head coach. Kidd finished third in voting for the Coach of the Year Award behind Mike Budenholzer and Steve Kerr.

The 2015–16 season was less successful for Kidd, as the Bucks finished with a 33–49 record and did not qualify to the playoffs. On December 20, 2015, it was reported that Kidd would be out indefinitely as he would undergo hip surgery on December 21. While Kidd was recovering, his assistant Joe Prunty was acting as an interim coach. On a positive note, Kidd moved rising 21-year old Giannis Antetokounmpo into a point guard position, which helped the young player to record five triple doubles in the season and make progress in most statistical categories. Despite the disappointing season, the Bucks owners issued Kidd a vote of confidence and mentioned a possible contract extension, which was set to expire after the next season.

The following season Kidd led the Bucks to a winning record as they qualified to the playoffs for the second time in three years. Kidd had his projected starting unit available for just several minutes during the season. On February 9, the same day the shooting guard Khris Middleton was making his season debut after recovering from a hamstring injury, the power forward Jabari Parker went down with an ACL injury. Despite the setback, Kidd had the Bucks finishing the season strong with a 42–40 record. In the first round of the playoffs against the Toronto Raptors, the Bucks took a 2–1 lead after game 3, but went on to lose the series in six games. On January 22, 2018, the Bucks fired Kidd after the team posted a 23–22 record midway through the 2017–18 season.

=== Los Angeles Lakers (2019–2021) ===
On July 31, 2019, Kidd was hired as an assistant coach by the Los Angeles Lakers. Kidd would go on to win his second NBA championship when the Lakers defeated the Miami Heat in six games in the 2020 NBA Finals. It was his first championship as a coach at any level.

=== Dallas Mavericks (2021–2026) ===
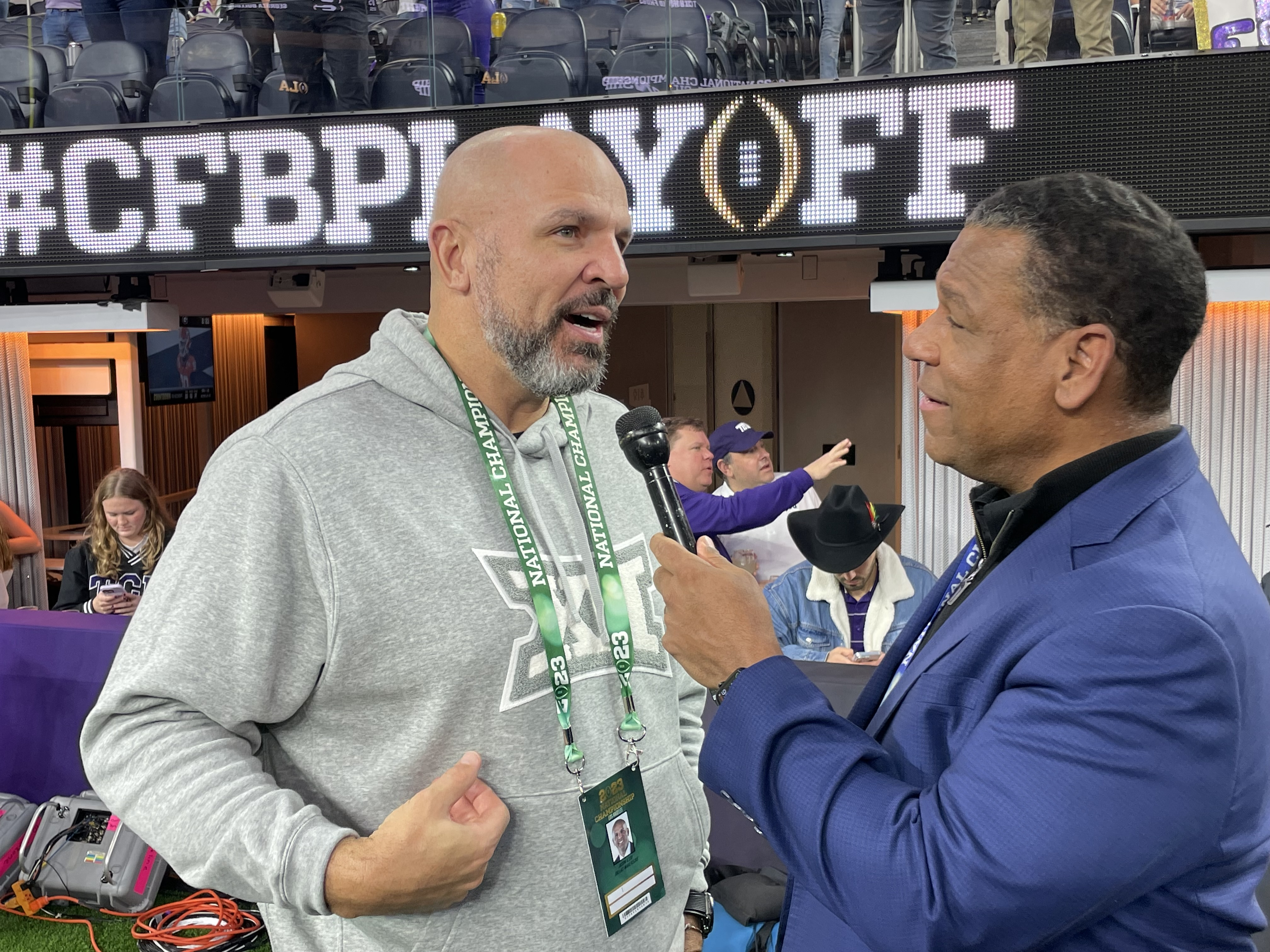
Kidd gives an interview on the sidelines of the 2023 College Football Playoff National Championship.

On June 28, 2021, Kidd was hired as the head coach of the Dallas Mavericks following longtime head coach Rick Carlisle's resignation. During the 2021–22 season, Kidd helped lead the Mavericks to a regular season record of 52–30, which earned them the fourth seed in the Western Conference standings. This was the Mavericks' highest win total since the 2014–15 season when they finished 50–32, and their highest standings finish since the 2010–11 season, when Kidd was a player for the Mavericks team that finished as the third seed. In his first season as head coach, Kidd oversaw a defensive renaissance in Dallas, transforming a team that was among the worst defenses in the league prior to his tenure, into one of the top units in the NBA. Under Kidd, the Mavericks won their first two playoff series since their 2011 NBA championship when they defeated the Utah Jazz in six games in the first round of the 2022 NBA playoffs and the Phoenix Suns in seven games in the second round, advancing to the Western Conference finals. Kidd, along with Mavericks general manager Nico Harrison has been credited with improving the organizational culture and creating an environment more favorable to players than was present under former coach Rick Carlisle. Dallas' run was halted in the Western Conference finals as they fell short to the Golden State Warriors in five games.

The 2022–23 season was less successful for Kidd, as the Mavericks finished with a 38–44 record and failed to qualify for the playoffs. However, Kidd was instrumental in bringing Kyrie Irving to Dallas from the Brooklyn Nets, further improving the team for future success. On May 6, 2024, Mavericks signed Kidd to a multi-year contract extension. In 2024, following a season where the Mavericks failed to reach the playoffs, Kidd led the Mavericks to their first NBA finals appearance since their 2011 championship-winning playoff run, where they beat the fourth-seed Los Angeles Clippers 4–2 in the first round, top-seed Oklahoma City Thunder 4–2 in the second round, and the third-seed Minnesota Timberwolves 4–1 in the Western Conference finals. In the 2024 NBA Finals, the Mavericks lost to the Boston Celtics in five games.

On October 15, 2025, Kidd and the Mavericks agreed to a multi-year contract extension. On May 19, 2026, it was announced that Kidd and the Mavericks organization mutually parted ways, ending his five-year tenure as head coach. He still had four years and over $40 million left on his contract.

== Milestones ==
- In game 3 of the second round of the 2007 playoffs, Kidd recorded his 11th postseason triple-double breaking a tie with Larry Bird for second place on the All-Time career list for postseason triple-doubles.
- On April 16, 2008, Kidd recorded his 100th career triple-double in the final regular season game with the Dallas Mavericks that year against the New Orleans Hornets.
- On March 2, 2009, Kidd became just the fourth player in NBA history to reach the 10,000 assist milestone.
- Kidd is tied for the most turnovers in a game. He committed 14 turnovers against the New York Knicks on November 17, 2000, while playing for the Phoenix Suns. Kidd tied John Drew, who also turned the ball over 14 times in a game on March 1, 1978.
- On April 5, 2009, Kidd passed Magic Johnson for third on the all-time assist list in a 140–116 victory over the Phoenix Suns. Kidd scored 19 points to go with a season high 20 assists, giving him a total of 10,142 career assists.
- On November 26, 2009, Kidd moved into 2nd place on the all-time assists list in a win against the Houston Rockets, surpassing Mark Jackson on the list.
- On November 12, 2010, Kidd dished out his 11,000th career assist on an alley-oop dunk to teammate Tyson Chandler.
- On January 12, 2011, Kidd hit his 1,720th three-point field goal, passing Dale Ellis for third place on the NBA career three-pointers made list.
- On February 20, 2012, Kidd collected his 2,515th career steal (passing Michael Jordan) for second all-time in steals behind only John Stockton.
- On February 8, 2013, Kidd broke the 12,000 career assist mark as a New York Knick vs. the Minnesota Timberwolves in Minneapolis, Minnesota. He reached 12,000 on a pass to J. R. Smith for a three-pointer. The Knicks eventually won that game 100–94.
- In 2013, Kidd became the first player to win back-to-back NBA Sportsmanship Awards and he finished his career as the only player in NBA history with 17,500 points, 12,000 assists, 8,000 rebounds and 2,500 steals.

== National team career ==
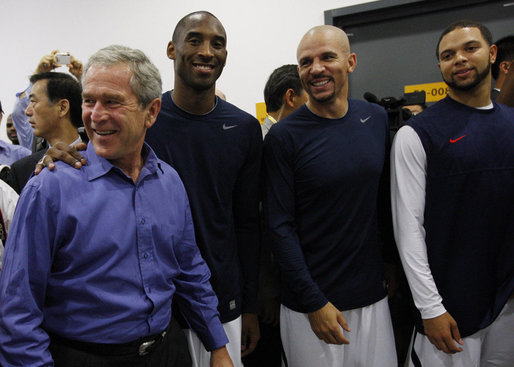
Kidd (second from right) with U.S. President George W. Bush, Kobe Bryant, and Deron Williams at the 2008 Olympics

Kidd's first participation in USA basketball came after his first season in college. He was the only freshman chosen to take part in Team USA's 10-member team. The team played five games in Europe and finished with a record of 3–2. Kidd tied for team highs in assists per game with 4.0, and steals per game with 1.4. He also had averages of 8.4 points per game, and 4.2 rebounds per game.

Kidd's next stint with USA basketball came in 1999 where he participated in the USA Olympic Qualifying Tournament. The team finished with an undefeated record of 10–0 resulting in a gold medal and earning a berth at the 2000 Olympics. Kidd averaged 7.4 ppg, 6.8 apg, 4.4 rpg, 2.7 spg, and again led the team in APG and SPG.

In 2000, Kidd was appointed as one of Team USA's tri-captains for the 2000 Olympics at Sydney. Kidd again led the team to an undefeated record of 8–0 which resulted in team USA winning the gold medal at the Olympic Games. Kidd had averages of 6.0 ppg, 5.3 rpg, and had team highs of 4.4 apg, and 1.1 spg. Kidd also had a FG% of 51.6 and shot 50 percent from three-point range.

In November 2002, Kidd was selected to participate in the 2002 USA Basketball Men's World Championship Team. However, he had to withdraw from the team due to an injury.

Kidd came back the next year and participated at the 2003 FIBA Americas Olympic Qualifying Tournament in Puerto Rico. Kidd again led the team to a record of 10–0, bringing home the gold medal and a berth at the 2004 Olympics. Kidd started all 10 games and had averages of 3.4 ppg, 2.7 rpg, 5.9 apg, and 1.2 spg.

However, Kidd again had to withdraw from the 2004 Olympic team due to another injury.

In 2007, Kidd participated in the FIBA Americas Championship 2007. Kidd helped the team to a 10–0 record where he brought home another gold medal and a berth at the 2008 Olympics in Beijing, China. Kidd had averages of 1.8 ppg, 3.3 rpg, 4.6 apg, and 1.3 spg. He also shot 60% from the field and 62.5% from three-point distance. Kidd led the entire tournament with an assist-to-turnover ratio of 9.20. With Kidd's help team USA averaged 116.7 ppg, and defeated their opponents by a margin of 39.5 ppg.

In 2008, Kidd participated in the 2008 Olympics where the team yet again went undefeated in winning their first gold medal since the 2000 Olympics. The team, given the "Redeem team" moniker because of failures in the 2002 FIBA World Championship, 2004 Summer Olympics and 2006 FIBA World Championship, were once again crowned to be the best team in world basketball.

Overall, Kidd brought home five gold medals as member of the national team: three from Olympic qualifying tournaments, one from the 2000 Sydney Olympics, and one from the 2008 Beijing Olympics.

== Player profile ==
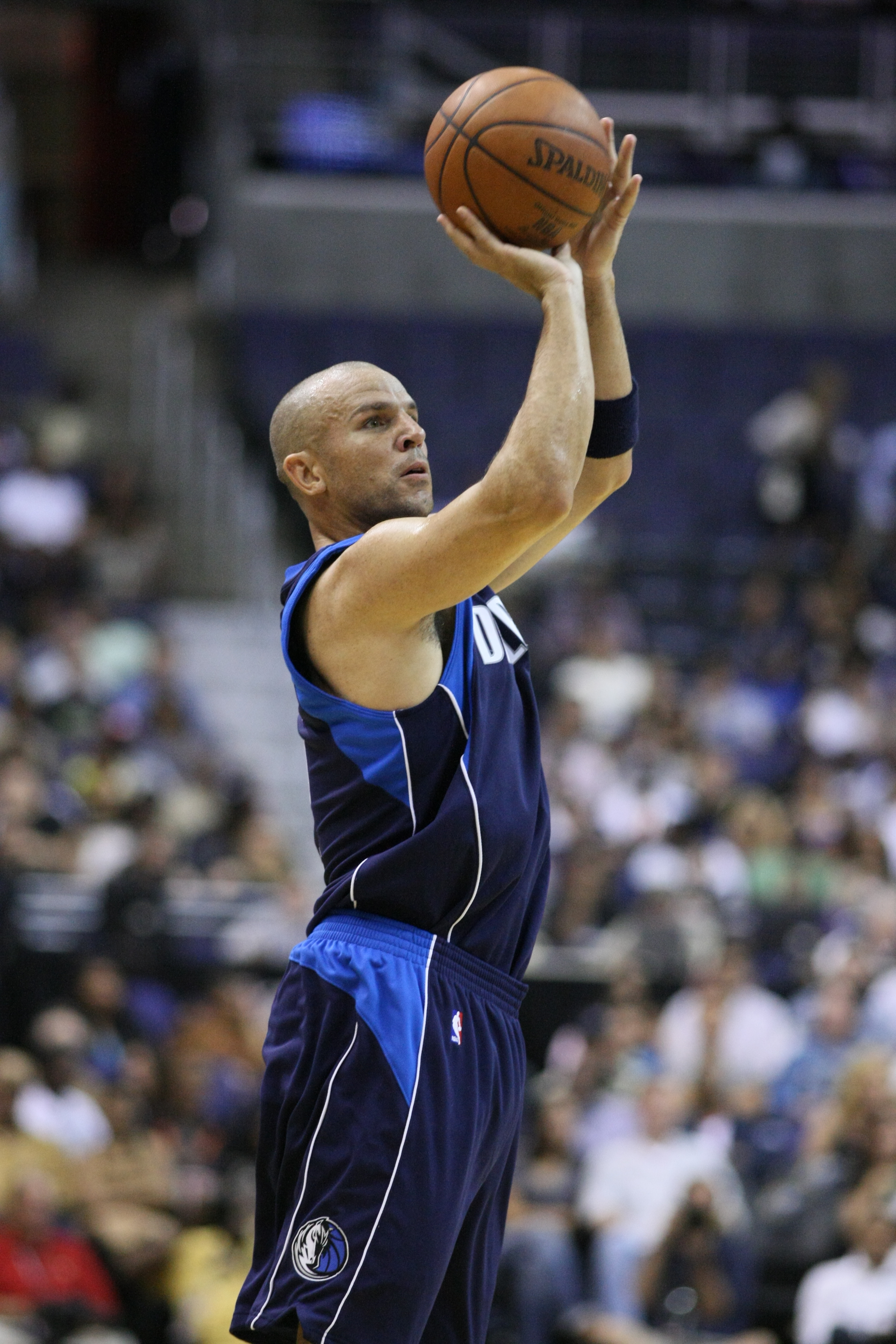
Kidd shooting a jump shot in 2009

Kidd retired second all-time in NBA history in both assists and steals behind John Stockton. He led the NBA in assists five times. His 107 career triple-doubles are sixth all-time, trailing Russell Westbrook, Oscar Robertson, Magic Johnson, Nikola Jokić, and LeBron James. Kidd finished his career with averages of 12.6 points, 8.7 assists, 6.3 rebounds, and 1.9 steals in 1,391 regular season games. He impacted games with his accurate passes and by involving his teammates; scoring was not his focus. He is considered by many to be one of the best rebounding guards ever to play in the league, and ESPN called him "one of the best passing and rebounding point guards in NBA history." In 2021, to commemorate the NBA's 75th Anniversary The Athletic ranked their top 75 players of all time, and named Kidd as the 36th greatest player in NBA history.

Although Kidd was considered a poor outside shooter when he began his professional career, he retired ranked third all-time in the NBA in three-point field goals made. The New York Times called his improvement as a shooter "perhaps Kidd's biggest, and most surprising, transformation". He considered his NBA championship with Dallas and his two gold medals in the Olympics as tied for the top highlights of his career, followed by the co-Rookie of the Year he shared with Grant Hill.

== Broadcasting career ==
After being fired by the Mavericks, Kidd was named as a studio analyst for NBA Countdown and color commentator for NBA coverage airing on ABC and ESPN.

== Personal life ==
Kidd married his first wife, Joumana, in 1997. In January 2001, he was arrested and pled guilty to a domestic abuse charge for assaulting her. As part of his plea, Kidd was ordered to attend anger management classes for six months. Kidd completed the mandatory counseling and continued to attend on his own. On January 9, 2007, Kidd filed for divorce, citing "extreme cruelty" during their relationship. He contended intense jealousy, paranoia and the threat of "false domestic abuse claims" to the police as reasons for the divorce. On February 15, 2007, Joumana Kidd filed a counterclaim for divorce, claiming that Jason, among instances of abuse, "broke her rib and damaged her hearing by smashing her head into the console of a car." The couple has three children.

On September 10, 2011, Kidd married Porschla Coleman, a former model.

On July 15, 2012, Kidd was arrested by police in Southampton Town, New York and charged with the misdemeanor of driving while intoxicated. According to police, around 2 a.m. Kidd's vehicle struck a telephone pole a few blocks away from his home and ended up in the woods, where officers determined him to be under the influence.

On April 24, 2025, it was announced that Kidd had joined the ownership group of English Premier League club Everton.

== Career statistics ==
Legend
GP	Games played	GS	Games started	MPG	Minutes per game
FG%	Field goal percentage	3P%	3-point field goal percentage	FT%	Free throw percentage
RPG	Rebounds per game	APG	Assists per game	SPG	Steals per game
BPG	Blocks per game	PPG	Points per game	**Bold**	Career high
†	Won an NBA championship	*	Led the league

=== NBA ===
==== Regular season ====
Year	Team	GP	GS	MPG	FG%	3P%	FT%	RPG	APG	SPG	BPG	PPG
1994–95	Dallas	79	79	33.8	.385	.272	.698	5.4	7.7	1.9	.3	11.7
1995–96	Dallas	81	81	37.5	.381	.336	.692	6.8	9.7	2.2	.3	16.6
1996–97	Dallas	22	22	36.0	.369	.323	.667	4.1	9.1	2.0	.4	9.9
1996–97	Phoenix	33	23	35.5	.423	.400	.688	4.8	9.0	**2.4**	.4	11.6
1997–98	Phoenix	**82***	**82***	38.0	.416	.313	.799	6.2	9.1	2.0	.3	11.6
1998–99	Phoenix	50*	50*	**41.2**	**.444**	.366	.757	6.8	**10.8***	2.3	.4	16.9
1999–00	Phoenix	67	67	39.0	.409	.337	.829	7.2	10.1*	2.0	.4	14.3
2000–01	Phoenix	77	76	39.8	.411	.297	.814	6.4	9.8*	2.2	.3	16.9
2001–02	New Jersey	**82**	**82**	37.3	.391	.321	.814	7.3	9.9	2.1	.2	14.7
2002–03	New Jersey	80	80	37.4	.414	.341	.841	6.3	8.9*	2.2	.3	**18.7**
2003–04	New Jersey	67	66	36.6	.384	.321	.827	6.4	9.2*	1.8	.2	15.5
2004–05	New Jersey	66	65	36.9	.398	.360	.740	7.4	8.3	1.9	.1	14.4
2005–06	New Jersey	80	80	37.2	.404	.352	.795	7.3	8.4	1.9	.4	13.3
2006–07	New Jersey	80	80	36.7	.406	.343	.778	**8.2**	9.2	1.6	.3	13.0
2007–08	New Jersey	51	51	37.2	.366	.356	.820	8.1	10.4	1.5	.3	11.3
2007–08	Dallas	29	29	34.9	.426	**.461**	.815	6.5	9.5	2.1	.4	9.9
2008–09	Dallas	81	81	35.6	.416	.406	.819	6.2	8.7	2.0	**.5**	9.0
2009–10	Dallas	80	80	36.0	.423	.425	.808	5.6	9.1	1.8	.4	10.3
2010–11†	Dallas	80	80	33.2	.361	.340	**.870**	4.4	8.2	1.7	.4	7.9
2011–12	Dallas	48	48	28.7	.363	.354	.786	4.1	5.5	1.7	.2	6.2
2012–13	New York	76	48	26.9	.372	.351	.833	4.3	3.3	1.6	.3	6.0
Career		1,391	1,350	36.0	.400	.349	.785	6.3	8.7	1.9	.3	12.6
All-Star		9	5	23.2	.525	.478	.833	3.4	7.7	2.7	.0	6.4

==== Playoffs ====
Year	Team	GP	GS	MPG	FG%	3P%	FT%	RPG	APG	SPG	BPG	PPG
1997	Phoenix	5	5	41.4	.396	.364	.526	6.0	9.8	2.2	.4	12.0
1998	Phoenix	4	4	42.8	.379	.000	.813	5.8	7.8	**4.0**	**.5**	14.3
1999	Phoenix	3	3	42.0	.419	.250	.714	2.3	10.3	1.7	.3	15.0
2000	Phoenix	6	6	38.2	.400	.364	.778	6.7	8.8	1.8	.2	9.8
2001	Phoenix	4	4	41.5	.319	.235	.750	6.0	**13.3**	2.0	.0	14.3
2002	New Jersey	20	20	40.2	.415	.189	.808	8.2	9.1	1.7	.4	19.6
2003	New Jersey	20	20	42.6	.402	.327	.825	7.7	8.2	1.8	.2	**20.1**
2004	New Jersey	11	11	43.1	.333	.208	.811	6.6	9.0	2.3	**.5**	12.6
2005	New Jersey	4	4	**45.5**	.388	.367	.545	9.0	7.3	2.5	.0	17.3
2006	New Jersey	11	11	40.9	.371	.300	.826	7.6	9.6	1.5	.2	12.0
2007	New Jersey	12	12	40.3	.432	.420	.520	**10.9**	10.9	1.8	.4	14.6
2008	Dallas	5	5	36.0	.421	**.462**	.625	6.4	6.8	1.4	.4	8.6
2009	Dallas	10	10	38.6	**.458**	.447	.850	5.8	5.9	2.2	.3	11.4
2010	Dallas	6	6	40.5	.304	.321	.917	6.8	7.0	2.3	.2	8.0
2011†	Dallas	**21**	**21**	35.4	.398	.374	.800	4.5	7.3	1.9	**.5**	9.3
2012	Dallas	4	4	36.0	.341	.346	.900	6.0	6.0	3.0	.3	11.5
2013	New York	12	0	20.6	.120	.176	**1.000**	3.5	2.0	1.0	.3	.9
Career		158	146	38.5	.391	.322	.781	6.7	8.0	1.9	.3	12.9

=== College ===
Year	Team	GP	GS	MPG	FG%	3P%	FT%	RPG	APG	SPG	BPG	PPG
1992–93	California	29	28	31.8	.463	.286	.657	4.9	7.7*	3.8*	.3	13.0
1993–94	California	30	29	35.1	.472	.362	.692	6.9	9.1*	3.1*	.3	16.7
Career		59	57	33.5	.468	.333	.677	5.9	8.4	3.5	.3	14.9

== Head coaching record ==
Legend
Regular season	G	Games coached	W	Games won	L	Games lost	W–L %	Win–loss %
Playoffs	PG	Playoff games	PW	Playoff wins	PL	Playoff losses	PW–L %	Playoff win–loss %

Team	Year	G	W	L	W–L%	Finish	PG	PW	PL	PW–L%	Result
Brooklyn	2013–14	82	44	38	.537	2nd in Atlantic	12	5	7	.417	Lost in conference semifinals
Milwaukee	2014–15	82	41	41	.500	3rd in Central	6	2	4	.333	Lost in first round
Milwaukee	2015–16	82	33	49	.402	5th in Central	—	—	—	—	Missed playoffs
Milwaukee	2016–17	82	42	40	.512	2nd in Central	6	2	4	.333	Lost in first round
Milwaukee	2017–18	45	23	22	.511	(fired)	—	—	—	—	—
Dallas	2021–22	82	52	30	.634	2nd in Southwest	18	9	9	.500	Lost in conference finals
Dallas	2022–23	82	38	44	.463	3rd in Southwest	—	—	—	—	Missed playoffs
Dallas	2023–24	82	50	32	.610	1st in Southwest	22	13	9	.591	Lost in NBA Finals
Dallas	2024–25	82	39	43	.476	3rd in Southwest	—	—	—	—	Missed playoffs
Dallas	2025–26	82	26	56	.317	3rd in Southwest	—	—	—	—	Missed playoffs
Career		783	388	395	.496		64	31	33	.484	

== See also ==
- List of NBA career assists leaders
- List of NBA career steals leaders
- List of NBA career turnovers leaders
- List of NBA career 3-point scoring leaders
- List of NBA career games played leaders
- List of NBA career minutes played leaders
- List of NBA career triple-double leaders
- List of NBA career playoff assists leaders
- List of NBA career playoff steals leaders
- List of NBA career playoff triple-double leaders
- List of NBA career playoff turnovers leaders
- List of NBA career playoff 3-point scoring leaders
- List of NBA single-game assists leaders
- List of NBA seasons played leaders
- List of oldest and youngest NBA players
