= Mike Brown (basketball, born 1963) =

American basketball player and coach

Personal information
- Born: July 19, 1963 (age 63) Newark, New Jersey, U.S.
- Listed height: 6 ft 10 in (2.08 m)
- Listed weight: 257 lb (117 kg)

Career information
- High school: Clifford J. Scott (East Orange, New Jersey)
- College: George Washington (1981–1985)
- NBA draft: 1985: 3rd round, 69th overall pick
- Drafted by: Chicago Bulls
- Playing career: 1985–2001
- Position: Power forward / center
- Number: 17, 40, 45

Career history

Playing
- 1985–1986: Aurora Desio
- 1986–1988: Chicago Bulls
- 1988–1993: Utah Jazz
- 1993–1995: Minnesota Timberwolves
- 1995: Teamsystem Bologna
- 1995–1996: Philadelphia 76ers
- 1996–1997: Viola Reggio Calabria
- 1997: Phoenix Suns
- 1997–1998: Viola Reggio Calabria
- 1998: Phoenix Suns
- 1998: Cantabria Lobos
- 2000: Manresa
- 2000–2001: Ourense

Coaching
- 2001–2002: Las Vegas Slam (assistant)
- 2002–2004: Roanoke Dazzle (assistant)
- 2004–2006: Fayetteville Patriots
- 2007–2008: Chicago Bulls (assistant)

Career NBA statistics
- Points: 3,130 (5.0 ppg)
- Rebounds: 2,762 (4.4 rpg)
- Assists: 424 (0.7 apg)
- Stats at NBA.com
- Stats at Basketball Reference

Michael Brown (born July 19, 1963) is an American retired professional basketball player and D-league head coach and NBA assistant coach. A durable 6'10" power forward/center, he played at George Washington University in the early 1980s, where he received the nickname "The New Washington Monument."

After four years of college ball, Brown was selected by the Chicago Bulls in the third round of the 1985 NBA draft. Brown would go on to play eleven seasons in the NBA, earning a reputation as a workhorse in the low post in limited minutes as a reserve as a member of the Bulls, the Utah Jazz, the Minnesota Timberwolves, the Philadelphia 76ers, and the Phoenix Suns. He was a fan favorite in his five seasons in Utah, and was affectionately nicknamed "the Brown Bear" by Jazz announcer Hot Rod Hundley. Brown retired with NBA career totals of 3,130 points and 2,762 rebounds. He also played professionally in Italy for Aurora Desio (1985–1986), Teamsystem Bologna (1995) and Viola Reggio Calabria (1996–1998).

Brown was an assistant coach for the Las Vegas Slam of the ABA for the 2001–02 season. From 2002 through 2004, he was an assistant coach for the National Basketball Development League's Roanoke Dazzle. In 2004, he replaced Jeff Capel as head coach of the D-League's Fayetteville Patriots.

During the 2007–08 NBA season, Brown worked as an assistant coach for the Chicago Bulls. He was signed primarily to work with the Bulls' young centers and power forwards.

== Career statistics ==
Legend
GP	Games played	GS	Games started	MPG	Minutes per game
FG%	Field goal percentage	3P%	3-point field goal percentage	FT%	Free throw percentage
RPG	Rebounds per game	APG	Assists per game	SPG	Steals per game
BPG	Blocks per game	PPG	Points per game	**Bold**	Career high
*	Led the league

=== NBA ===
==== Regular season ====
Year	Team	GP	GS	MPG	FG%	3P%	FT%	RPG	APG	SPG	BPG	PPG
1986–87	Chicago	62	3	13.2	.527	—	.639	3.5	.4	.3	.1	4.2
1987–88	Chicago	46	27	12.8	.448	.000	.577	3.5	.6	.2	.1	4.3
1988–89	Utah	66	16	15.9	.419	—	.708	3.9	.6	.4	.3	4.5
1989–90	Utah	**82***	0	17.0	.515	**.500**	**.789**	4.5	.6	.4	.3	6.2
1990–91	Utah	**82***	2	17.0	.454	—	.742	4.1	.6	.4	.3	4.8
1991–92	Utah	**82**	1	21.7	.453	.000	.667	**5.8**	**1.0**	.5	**.4**	**7.7**
1992–93	Utah	**82**	21	18.9	.430	.000	.689	4.8	.8	.4	.3	5.7
1993–94	Minnesota	**82***	**40**	**23.4**	.427	.000	.653	5.5	.9	**.6**	**.4**	3.6
1994–95	Minnesota	27	0	7.9	.250	.000	.556	1.7	.4	.3	.0	1.3
1995–96	Philadelphia	9	1	18.0	**.563**	—	.471	4.1	.3	.3	.2	2.9
1996–97	Phoenix	6	1	13.6	.417	—	.600	4.2	.8	.2	.2	2.7
Career		626	112	17.5	.455	.125	.690	4.4	.7	.4	.3	5.0

==== Playoffs ====
Year	Team	GP	GS	MPG	FG%	3P%	FT%	RPG	APG	SPG	BPG	PPG
1987	Chicago	1	0	3.0	.000	—	—	.0	.0	**1.0**	.0	.0
1988	Chicago	1	0	4.0	—	—	.500	.0	**1.0**	**1.0**	.0	1.0
1989	Utah	2	**1**	5.5	.000	—	—	1.0	.0	.0	.0	.0
1990	Utah	5	0	13.4	.467	—	.800	2.0	.6	.2	**.2**	3.6
1991	Utah	9	0	**24.8**	.482	—	.842	**7.3**	.6	.3	.1	**9.6**
1992	Utah	**16**	0	17.1	.400	—	.780	4.1	.7	.1	.1	5.8
1993	Utah	5	0	18.6	**.520**	—	.636	3.2	.4	.0	**.2**	6.6
1997	Phoenix	4	0	6.8	.400	—	**.875**	1.0	.3	.0	.0	2.8
1998	Phoenix	1	0	1.0	—	—	—	.0	.0	.0	.0	.0
Career		44	1	16.0	.441	—	.790	3.7	.5	.2	.1	5.5
