= Ben Davis (basketball) =

American basketball player (born 1972)

Personal information
- Born: December 26, 1972 (age 53) Vero Beach, Florida, U.S.
- Listed height: 6 ft 9 in (2.06 m)
- Listed weight: 242 lb (110 kg)

Career information
- High school: Oak Hill Academy (Mouth of Wilson, Virginia)
- College: Kansas (1991–1992); Hutchinson CC (1993–1994); Arizona (1994–1996)
- NBA draft: 1996: 2nd round, 43rd overall pick
- Drafted by: Phoenix Suns
- Playing career: 1996–2009
- Position: Power forward
- Number: 43, 4

Career history
- 1996–1997: Phoenix Suns
- 1997–1998: Grand Rapids Hoops
- 1998: New York Knicks
- 1998: Capitanes de Arecibo
- 1998–1999: Grand Rapids Hoops
- 1998: Tau Cerámica
- 1999: New York Knicks
- 1999: Idaho Stampede
- 1999–2000: Phoenix Suns
- 2000: Brujos de Guayama
- 2000: Kansas City Knights
- 2000–2001: Makedonikos
- 2001: Trotamundos de Carabobo
- 2001–2002: Cantabria Lobos
- 2002–2003: Roseto Sharks
- 2004: Westchester Wildfire
- 2005–2006: Benfica
- 2006–2007: Paysandu BB
- 2008–2009: Lechugueros de León

Career highlights
- First-team All-Pac-10 (1996); Second-team Parade All-American (1991); McDonald's All-American (1991)
- Stats at NBA.com
- Stats at Basketball Reference

Ben Jerome Davis (born December 26, 1972) is an American former professional basketball player who played with the NBA's Phoenix Suns and New York Knicks. Davis attended Oak Hill Academy, University of Kansas, the University of Florida, Hutchinson Community College, and the University of Arizona and played collegiately at all, except for Florida. In his one season at Hutchinson in 1994, Davis led team to the NJCAA championship.

Davis was selected 43rd overall in the 1996 NBA draft by the Phoenix Suns but played in the CBA in 1996–97 instead. As well as playing with the Suns and the New York Knicks during his short NBA career, Davis was also signed by the Miami Heat and Houston Rockets, but never played a game for either.

Davis last played in 2009 for Lechugueros de León in Mexico.
