= Mark Bryant =

American basketball player and coach

New York Knicks
- Title: Assistant coach
- League: NBA

Personal information
- Born: April 25, 1965 (age 61) Glen Ridge, New Jersey, U.S.
- Listed height: 6 ft 9 in (2.06 m)
- Listed weight: 245 lb (111 kg)

Career information
- High school: Columbia (Maplewood, New Jersey)
- College: Seton Hall (1984–1988)
- NBA draft: 1988: 1st round, 21st overall pick
- Drafted by: Portland Trail Blazers
- Playing career: 1988–2003
- Position: Power forward / center
- Number: 2, 9, 11

Career history

Playing
- 1988–1995: Portland Trail Blazers
- 1995–1996: Houston Rockets
- 1996–1998: Phoenix Suns
- 1999: Chicago Bulls
- 1999–2000: Cleveland Cavaliers
- 2000–2001: Dallas Mavericks
- 2001–2002: San Antonio Spurs
- 2002: Philadelphia 76ers
- 2002–2003: Denver Nuggets
- 2003: Boston Celtics

Coaching
- 2004–2005: Dallas Mavericks (assistant)
- 2005–2007: Orlando Magic (assistant)
- 2007–2019: Seattle SuperSonics / Oklahoma City Thunder (assistant)
- 2019–2023: Phoenix Suns (assistant)
- 2023–2024: Detroit Pistons (assistant)
- 2024–present: New York Knicks (assistant)

Career highlights
- As player: First-team All-Big East (1988); Haggerty Award (1988); As assistant coach: NBA champion (2026); NBA Cup champion (2025)

Career NBA statistics
- Points: 4,313 (5.4 ppg)
- Rebounds: 2,992 (3.8 rpg)
- Fouls: 2,018 (2.5 pfpg)
- Stats at NBA.com
- Stats at Basketball Reference
Medals
Men's basketball
Representing United States
Summer Universiade
Silver medal – second place	1987 Zagreb	National team

Mark Craig Bryant (born April 25, 1965) is an American professional basketball coach and former player who is currently an assistant coach for the New York Knicks. As a player, he played collegiately at Seton Hall University from 1984 to 1988, and was selected by the Portland Trail Blazers in the first round (21st pick overall) of the 1988 NBA draft. Bryant played for 10 NBA teams during his career, averaging 5.4 ppg and appeared in the 1990 and 1992 NBA Finals as a member of the Blazers.

In the 1995–96 NBA season with the Houston Rockets, he averaged 8.6 ppg and 4.9 rpg while playing 71 games. The next season, Bryant averaged career-high averages of 9.3 points, 5.2 rebounds, and 1.1 assists per game with the Phoenix Suns while playing 41 regular season games that season.

Bryant first became an assistant coach for the Dallas Mavericks during the 2004–05 season. He then was an assistant coach with the Orlando Magic from 2005 to 2007. Bryant also became an assistant coach for the Seattle SuperSonics during their last official season in the league before the team moved to Oklahoma City to become the Oklahoma City Thunder. Bryant remained an assistant coach for the Thunder through the end of the 2018–19 NBA season. Before the start of the 2019–20 NBA season, Bryant was hired as assistant coach by the Phoenix Suns, returning to the franchise where he played as a player to join new head coach Monty Williams' staff.

Born in Glen Ridge, New Jersey, Bryant grew up in South Orange, New Jersey, and attended Columbia High School.

Bryant was one of the first players in NBA history to complete the Texas Triple, as he was a member of all three of the state's NBA franchises.

== Career statistics ==
Legend
GP	Games played	GS	Games started	MPG	Minutes per game
FG%	Field goal percentage	3P%	3-point field goal percentage	FT%	Free throw percentage
RPG	Rebounds per game	APG	Assists per game	SPG	Steals per game
BPG	Blocks per game	PPG	Points per game	**Bold**	Career high

=== NBA ===
Source

=== Regular season ===
Year	Team	GP	GS	MPG	FG%	3P%	FT%	RPG	APG	SPG	BPG	PPG
1988–89	Portland	56	32	14.3	.486	–	.580	3.2	.6	.4	.1	5.0
1989–90	Portland	58	0	9.7	.458	–	.580	2.5	.2	.3	.2	2.9
1990–91	Portland	53	0	14.7	.488	.000	.733	3.6	.5	.3	.2	5.1
1991–92	Portland	56	0	14.3	.480	.000	.667	3.6	.7	.5	.1	4.1
1992–93	Portland	**80**	24	17.5	.503	.000	.703	4.1	.5	.5	.3	6.0
1993–94	Portland	79	10	18.2	.482	.000	.692	4.0	.5	.4	**.4**	5.6
1994–95	Portland	49	0	13.4	.526	**.500**	.651	3.3	.6	.4	.3	5.0
1995–96	Houston	71	9	22.8	.543	.000	.718	4.9	.7	.4	.3	8.6
1996–97	Phoenix	41	18	24.8	**.553**	–	.704	**5.2**	**1.1**	.5	.1	**9.3**
1997–98	Phoenix	70	22	15.9	.484	.000	.768	3.5	.7	.5	.2	4.2
1998–99	Chicago	45	29	**26.8**	.483	.000	.645	**5.2**	**1.1**	**.8**	**.4**	9.0
1999–00	Cleveland	75	**50**	22.8	.503	–	.809	4.7	.8	.4	**.4**	5.7
2000–01	Dallas	18	1	5.6	.400	–	.600	1.2	.2	.1	.1	1.1
2001–02	San Antonio	30	3	6.9	.455	–	.750	1.5	.3	.2	.1	1.9
2002–03	Philadelphia	11	0	7.0	.294	–	**1.000**	1.5	.1	.1	.1	1.1
2002–03	Denver	3	0	4.7	.000	–	.500	.7	.7	.0	.0	.3
2002–03	Boston	2	0	4.5	.000	–	–	1.0	.5	.0	.0	.0
Career		797	198	16.9	.500	.083	.697	3.8	.6	.4	.2	5.4

=== Playoffs ===
Year	Team	GP	GS	MPG	FG%	3P%	FT%	RPG	APG	SPG	BPG	PPG
1990	Portland	13	0	12.3	.545	–	.750	2.2	.2	.2	.2	3.2
1991	Portland	**14**	0	9.8	.455	–	.875	2.3	.1	.1	.1	2.4
1992	Portland	12	0	9.7	.375	–	.750	2.4	.1	.3	.0	1.9
1993	Portland	4	**4**	20.8	.459	–	**1.000**	4.5	.0	.0	**.8**	9.8
1994	Portland	4	1	16.0	.294	.000	–	3.0	**.5**	.5	.5	2.5
1995	Portland	2	0	3.0	.500	–	.000	1.0	.0	.0	.0	1.0
1996	Houston	8	0	18.1	**.600**	–	.800	3.4	**.5**	.1	.3	6.8
1997	Phoenix	4	0	9.0	.400	–	**1.000**	1.0	.0	.0	.0	2.8
1998	Phoenix	4	1	**23.3**	.500	–	.500	**5.8**	.3	**1.0**	.5	**10.0**
2001	Dallas	4	0	8.5	.500	–	–	1.5	.0	.3	.0	.5
2002	San Antonio	9	**4**	10.1	.450	–	.500	1.3	.1	.1	.2	2.3
2003	Boston	1	0	2.0	–	–	–	.0	.0	.0	.0	.0
Career		79	10	12.2	.469	.000	.732	2.5	.2	.2	.2	3.5
