= Loren Meyer =

American basketball player (born 1972)

Personal information
- Born: December 30, 1972 (age 53) Emmetsburg, Iowa, U.S.
- Listed height: 6 ft 10 in (2.08 m)
- Listed weight: 257 lb (117 kg)

Career information
- High school: Ruthven-Ayrshire (Ruthven, Iowa)
- College: Iowa State (1991–1995)
- NBA draft: 1995: 1st round, 24th overall pick
- Drafted by: Dallas Mavericks
- Playing career: 1995–2001
- Position: Center / power forward
- Number: 40, 34

Career history
- 1995–1996: Dallas Mavericks
- 1996–1997: Phoenix Suns
- 1999: Denver Nuggets
- 2000–2001: Cheshire Jets

Career highlights
- Third-team Parade All-American (1991)

Career NBA statistics
- Points: 645 (4.6 ppg)
- Rebounds: 480 (3.4 rpg)
- Blocks: 50 (0.4 bpg)
- Stats at NBA.com
- Stats at Basketball Reference

Loren Henry Meyer (born December 30, 1972) is an American former professional basketball player who played three seasons in the National Basketball Association (NBA). He was selected by the Dallas Mavericks in the first round (24th pick overall) of the 1995 NBA draft.

== Biography ==
Meyer was born in Emmetsburg, Iowa. He attended Ruthven-Ayrshire High School in Ruthven, Iowa.

A 6'10", 257-pound center who played college basketball at Iowa State University, Meyer played in three NBA seasons for the Mavericks, Phoenix Suns and Denver Nuggets.

In his NBA career, Meyer played in a total of 140 games and scored a total of 645 points, averaging 4.6 points per game.

Meyer was inducted into the Iowa High School Basketball Hall of Fame in March 2009.

Meyer currently resides in his hometown of Ruthven, Iowa where he owns farmland.

== Professional career ==
=== Dallas Mavericks (1995–1996) ===
Meyer was selected with 24th overall pick in the first round of the 1995 NBA draft. He was drafted by the Dallas Mavericks who landed him in a trade with Rolando Blackman in the 1992 off-season. The Mavericks were a rebuilding team at the team at the time and they had four Centers on the team throughout the 1995–96 season, so Meyer had to fight for minutes. And he earned himself some good minutes, averaging 17.6 minutes per game in his rookie season. He averaged 5.0 points per game and 4.4 rebounds per game in his rookie campaign. He was seen as inefficient and undersized for his position, but he was a good athletic defender and hustler and he had the intangibles which didn't show up the box score but were valuable in-game. On December 28, 1995, Meyer recorded a career high 13 rebounds in a 103–101 win to the Vancouver Grizzlies. On March 31, 1996, Meyer recorded a season high 14 points in a 115–100 loss to the Portland Trail Blazers.

=== Phoenix Suns (1996–1998) ===
On December 26, 1996, Meyer was involved in a blockbuster trade which included himself, Jason Kidd, and Tony Dumas to the Phoenix Suns in exchange for Sam Cassell, Michael Finley, A.C. Green, and a 1998 2nd round draft pick (Greg Buckner was selected). Meyer averaged 4.9 points for the whole season but for the Suns he averaged a career high 5.4 points per game. He became a better scorer and shot better percentages from the field. He averaged a career high 44% FG% and a whopping 60% 3pt% for the Suns. On January 14, 1997, Meyer dropped a career high 18 points in a 110–101 win against the Denver Nuggets. Meyer helped the Suns reach the 1997 playoffs. They went 40–42 and despite the losing season they placed 7th in the Western Conference and qualified for the post-season. The Suns played the Seattle SuperSonics in Meyer's first and only playoff appearance. The Suns played surprisingly well and pushed the SuperSonics to 5 games before ultimately losing the series 2–3.

Unfortunately for Meyer, he missed the entire 1997–1998 season due to injury. On June 30, 1998, the Suns waived Meyer.

=== Denver Nuggets (1999) ===
On January 23, 1999, Meyer was signed as a free agent by the Denver Nuggets. At 26 years old, Meyer should've been physically entering the prime of his career, however when he came back to the NBA his game had fallen off. Due to the injury that sidelined him for the whole 1997–1998 season, he hadn't played an NBA game since May 3, 1997. Unfortunately this was a major detriment to his career, as he never statistically recovered from his absence in the league. His scoring, efficiency and overall play dropped. He averaged 1.1 points, on 20% 3pt% and 25% FG%. He only appeared in 14 games for the Nuggets who failed to make the playoffs in that season. After the 1998–1999 season ended, Meyer was released by the Nuggets on August 6, 1999.

=== Retirement ===
He retired from the NBA shortly after being released by the Denver Nuggets.
