= 1985 Tulane University basketball point-shaving scandal =

Scandal involving student athletes at Tulane University

In early 1985, several individuals, including members of the Tulane Green Wave men's basketball team, were arrested on charges of engaging in a point shaving scheme. Per the allegations, several players, including star player John "Hot Rod" Williams, intentionally manipulated the outcomes of two games (and attempted to manipulate the outcome of a third) for the benefit of several individuals who had placed bets on the games. The scandal is considered one of the most notorious in United States college athletics.

According to the state prosecutors, several Tulane University students proposed the point-shaving scheme to members of the basketball team, who agreed. Gary Kranz, a non-athlete student who initiated conversations about the scheme with the players, already had a relationship with several of the players, to whom he had provided cocaine. Prosecutors alleged that the players successfully engaged in point shaving in two games and unsuccessfully attempted to do so in another game. Additionally, there had been discussions of point shaving in a fourth game, though the players opted against this. In total, prosecutors alleged that the players received several thousand dollars for their involvement in the scheme. Ultimately, several individuals pleaded guilty to several counts of conspiracy to commit sports bribery, while Kranz also pleaded guilty to 10 counts of sports bribery. However, Williams took his case to trial, where a jury found him not guilty, resulting in his acquittal.

In the immediate aftermath of the scandal, Williams stated that a former assistant coach had paid him several thousand dollars to commit to Tulane and that he had received a weekly stipend from head coach Ned Fowler, in violation of the policy of amateurism in the NCAA. Following this, Fowler and much of the coaching staff resigned and the athletic director announced that he would resign several months later. In response to the scandal, Eamon M. Kelly, Tulane's president, announced that the university would be eliminating its basketball program. It would eventually be revived several years later. Meanwhile, after his court cases came to a conclusion, Williams became a professional basketball player in the National Basketball Association.

== Background ==
=== Point shaving in college basketball ===
Point shaving is a type of match fixing in organized sport wherein one or more players alter the outcome of a game in order to benefit people engaged in spread betting. In spread betting, people place bets based on previously published point spreads, which are numbers presented by bookmakers that are estimates of the difference in points between the favorites (the team that is projected to win) and the underdogs (the team that is projected to lose. With point shaving, gamblers will often bribe the favorites in order to not cover the spread, since doing so does not inherently mean that the team needs to lose, but simply win by a smaller margin than predicted by the bookmakers.

There have been several high-profile instances of point shaving in basketball, due in part to the fast-paced tempo of the game and the ability of one player to directly manipulate the outcome of a game through intentionally missing shots and drawing fouls. According to sportswriter Larry Atkins, student athletes in the National Collegiate Athletic Association (NCAA) are inclined to engage in point shaving schemes due to the policy of amateurism in the NCAA, where the athletes are generally not liable to have the types of high-paying contracts found in professional sports. One of the most well-known point shaving scandals was the 1951 college basketball point-shaving scandal, which saw the arrest of 32 players from multiple universities in the New York metropolitan area in a match fixing scheme dating back to at least 1947. For the 1952–53 season, the Kentucky Wildcats men's basketball program was suspended by the NCAA for their involvement in a gambling scheme. This marked the first time that the NCAA had applied the "death penalty" to a member institution. As a result of the 1978–79 Boston College basketball point-shaving scandal, one player was sentenced to 10 years in prison in what was one of the severest punishments ever leveled against a student athlete.

=== Tulane University ===
In 1981, Ned Fowler became the head coach of the Tulane Green Wave men's basketball team at Tulane University in New Orleans. Over the next four years, Fowler oversaw several successful seasons, accumulating a win-loss record of 70–45 during that time. During this time, John "Hot Rod" Williams, a center on the team who played from 1981 to 1985, became a standout player. He was widely regarded as one of Tulane's best players, serving as the team's top scorer in three of his four seasons and winning all-conference honors from the Metro Conference in two of those seasons. Williams, who had averaged 17.8 points per game during the 1984–85 NCAA Division I men's basketball season, was widely expected to be drafted in an early round of the 1985 NBA draft, with The New York Times projecting that he would be drafted in the first round.

== The scandal ==
=== Initial arrests and accusations ===
On the night of March 26, 1985, Williams was arrested at his home in Sorrento, Louisiana. That same night, Gary Kranz, a non-basketball playing student at Tulane, was also arrested. Both were charged with violating Louisiana's laws regarding sports bribery, while Kranz was also charged with nine counts of distribution and one count of distribution of cocaine. The next day, two more Green Wave basketball players—David Dominique and Bobby Thompson—were also arrested on charges of sports bribery. Following these arrests, Harry Connick Sr., the district attorney for New Orleans, stated that more arrests were possible. All four individuals were ultimately released, with Kranz paying a surety bond and the players released on their own recognizance.

The players were accused of engaging in point shaving in two home games: a 64–63 victory against the Southern Miss Golden Eagles on February 6 and a 49–60 loss to the Memphis State Tigers on February 20. In the former, Williams scored 15 points, Dominique scored 10, and Thompson did not play, while in the latter, Williams scored 14, Dominique 4, and Thompson 0. In both cases, the Green Wave failed to cover the projected point spread. (Note: For the game against Southern Miss, Tulane was favored to win by 10.5 points. Meanwhile, in the game against Memphis State, Tulane were 4-point underdogs.)

Per Connick, his office had initially began investigating possible bribery following a tip from Edward Kohnke IV, a local lawyer who had graduated from Tulane and was a supporter of the university's athletics programs. Kohnke said that he had heard about a match fixing scheme from "a source on the street" and personally confirmed his suspicions by contacting several bookmakers, who all stated that they were aware of the scheme. Kohnke later stated that he had first been made aware of the scandal by his brother, who told him of a rumor where a Tulane basketball player had alerted a Louisiana State University student that the Southern Miss game had been fixed.

In response, Williams stated that he was innocent, while Fowler stated that, based on his review of game footage, he did not believe that the players had engaged in point shaving. In a press conference, the university stated that they had been made aware of the alleged point shaving following a call to one of the basketball team's coaches from a colleague in Georgia, prompting an in-house investigation. The university also stated that they had alerted both the commissioner of the Metro Conference and the Federal Bureau of Investigation (FBI) to the matter.

=== Subsequent arrests ===
On the morning of March 28, a grand jury began its hearing of the case with testimony from Tulane basketball players. Most of the basketball players on the team attended, but did not participate in, the hearing, while two players—Clyde Eads and Jon Johnson—testified. These two had been granted immunity from prosecutors in exchange for their testimony. Later that day, a fifth student, Mark Howard Olensky, was arrested on several charges, including two counts of sports bribery, two counts of conspiracy to commit sports bribery, and one count of conspiracy to distribute cocaine. Per The New York Times, sources familiar with the case, including Kohnke, stated that cocaine had been distributed to basketball players in order to gain their friendship as part of the point shaving scandal.

By April 3, the number of people who had been arrested on charges of bribery related to the scandal had risen to eight. This followed the arrest of a sixth student, David J. Rothenberg, and two non-student New Orleans residents, Craig Bourgeois and Roland Ruiz. That same day, federal investigators announced that they were suspending their operations so as not to interfere with the state case, with United States Attorney John Volz saying, "We are not going to do anything that might adversely affect District Attorney Harry Connick's case".

=== Indictments and further legal developments ===
On April 5, the eight arrested individuals were officially indicted on charges related to the point shaving scandal. Per the indictment, prosecutors alleged that Kranz, Olensky, and Rothenberg, who were all members of the Alpha Epsilon Pi fraternity chapter at Tulane, had initiated the plans for the point shaving scandal. On February 2, the day of the Southern Miss game, Kranz discussed the possibility of point shaving with Eads and Johnson, offering them money that they would earn through betting on the game. Kranz had an existing relationship with Eads and Johnson, as he had previously provided them with cocaine in exchange for basketball gear. However, no players were charged with drug use. Eads and Johnson recruited Dominique, Thompson, and Williams into the scheme.

Over the next several weeks, these players successfully engaged in point shaving in games against Southern Miss and Memphis State, for which they received payments of $3,500 ($10,477 in 2025) and $13,500 (equivalent to $40,412 in 2025), respectively. The indictments also mentioned a third game, a 66–65 loss to the Virginia Tech Hokies on February 16, which had been the subject of investigation. Per reporting from Time, the players had attempted to fix that game but had been unsuccessful. In addition, there had been discussions of fixing the Green Wave's game against the Louisville Cardinals, but the players opted against this, as they wished to win that game. In total, the players involved in the alleged scheme received approximately $18,000 ($54,000 in 2025), which was divided between the five of them. (Note: Sources vary on exactly how much money was received by the basketball players for their involvement in the point shaving scheme. Multiple sources give the figure as approximately $18,000 ($54,000 in 2025). However, contemporary reporting from Time gives the figure as at least $19,500 ($58,000 in 2025). Meanwhile, a 2023 book on the subject states that there were multiple estimates ranging between $7,000 and $23,000 ($21,000 and ($69,000 in 2025). Concerning Williams specifically, several sources allege different values, including $4,900 ($15,000 in 2025), $5,400 ($16,000 in 2025), and $8,550 ($26,000 in 2025) for his involvement.) According to Time, the individuals implicated in the scheme could face up to 30 years of imprisonment if found guilty.

On April 29, Jet reported that two Tulane students who had been indicted, including one basketball player, had pleaded guilty to conspiracy to commit sports bribery, though the publication did not specify the individuals. The magazine also stated that, by that time, both Dominique and Williams had pleaded not guilty to all of their charges. On July 23, a state judge issued an arrest warrant for Ken Turkel, a roommate of Kranz's, concerning his possible involvement in the scheme.

== University and coaches' responses ==
=== Coaching resignations ===
On April 5, the same day that the grand jury indicted the arrested, Fowler and two of his assistant coaches—Max Pfeifer and Mike Richardson—had submitted letters of resignation to Eamon M. Kelly, the president of the university. This came after Fowler had admitted to giving cash payments to players on his team in violation of NCAA rules. While Kelly refused to discuss details of the payments, The Times-Picayune/States-Item reported that Williams had told prosecutors during testimony that, as a high school basketball player, he had been paid $10,000 ($35,414 in 2025) by a former assistant coach to recruit him to Tulane and that, during his last season at the university, Fowler had paid him $100 ($299 in 2025) weekly. The New York Times later reported that the $10,000 payment had been made by former assistant coach Tom Green, who had since left Tulane to become the head coach for the Fairleigh Dickinson Knights, and another unidentified man. None of the coaches were implicated in the point shaving scheme.

=== The university plans to eliminate the men's basketball program ===
In a press conference held on April 5 to discuss both the point shaving scandal and the player payments, Kelly stated that the university had reported the violations to the NCAA and the Metro Conference and that he would be requesting the university's board of administrators to permanently disband the university's basketball program. Kelly stated that the option was "[t]he only way I know to demonstrate unambiguously this academic community's intolerance of the violations and actions we have uncovered", further stating,

It's a difficult step for me personally, and a very difficult time for the university. I think it's critical that we do reaffirm the university's primary mission as an academic institution in terms of teaching, in terms of learning and in terms of research, and to indicate our unwillingness to permit this kind of activity in our intercollegiate programs.

Kelly also clarified that the university would continue to honor athletic scholarships that had been awarded to members of the basketball team, although by NCAA rule, players who were not involved in the scandal were free to transfer to other schools without having to serve a one-year penalty that was required when transferring at the time since the transfer was from a school that discontinued its program.j

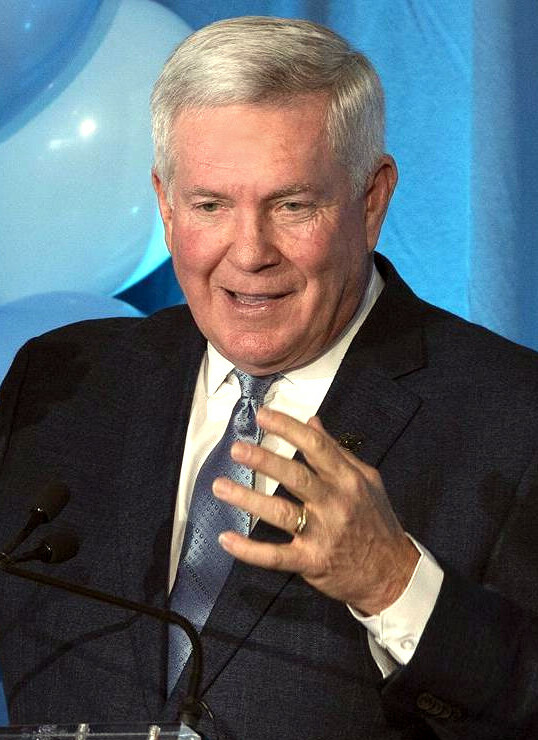
Mack Brown (pictured 2019) succeeded Hindman Wall as Tulane's athletic director following the latter's resignation.

On April 6, a Tulane athletics booster club organized a march of over 100 people across the university's campus to the president's residence to protest his decision to disband the program. The following week, Hindman Wall announced his intention to resign from his position as the university's athletic director, effective at the end of June. Wall, who had held that position since 1976, was not implicated in either the student athlete payment or point shaving scandals but stated that he had become exhausted by the controversies, saying with regards to his resignation, "It's just one of those things - I'm tired". Wall was replaced as athletic director by Mack Brown, the head coach of Tulane's football team.

By July 1985, the university had eliminated its men's basketball program, which had played its first game in 1905. The elimination made Tulane the only institution in NCAA Division I to support a football program but not a men's basketball program. By this time, the university had also been dropped from the Metro Conference, causing the women's basketball program, which was unaffected by the scandal, to compete as an independent.

== Legal outcomes ==
By early August, Kranz, Olensky, Rothenberg, and Thompson, had all pleaded guilty to two counts each of conspiracy to commit sports bribery. Additionally, Kranz also pleaded guilty to 10 counts of sports bribery. However, additional charges of cocaine dealing were dropped after Kranz agreed to testify against Williams. Meanwhile, Dominique, who faced the same charges as Williams, was scheduled to go to trial later in the year.

=== Williams's trials ===
Williams's trial commenced on August 12, with the defendant being charged with two counts of sports bribery and three counts of conspiracy to commit sports bribery. The trial was overseen by Judge Alvin V. Oser in a criminal district court. Williams faced a maximum sentence of up to $35,000 ($105,000 in 2025) in fines and 17 years of imprisonment.

I talked to Hot Rod and told him we needed to control the tempo of the game and we needed to lose by more than 10 points and he needed to be very soft on Keith Lee.

— Bobby Thompson, testifying against Williams on August 12, on his discussions with Williams prior to their February 20 game against Memphis State

On the first day of the trial, as part of a plea bargain, Thompson testified against Williams. He spoke about several instances in which the two of them discussed plans to engage in point shaving and also said that he had received money from Kranz that he then distributed to both Dominique and Williams. That same day, Olensky and Rothenberg both stated that they had made bets on games in which they believed that Williams was engaging in point shaving, though in cross examination, Olensky said that he did not have direct knowledge that Williams was engaging in point shaving and that the claims could have been fabrications by Thompson. Over the course of the trial, additional testimony was heard by Kranz, who, along with Olensky and Rothenberg, was participating as part of a plea bargain. Eads and Johnson also participated in the trial with grants of immunity.

The same month that the trial began, Judge Oser declared a mistrial and set a date of September 9 for a new trial. This decision came after the judge was informed by the defense that they had not been provided information on a piece of evidence provided by the prosecution that consisted of tape-recorded statements made by Johnson. On September 16, Jet reported that the judge declined a second motion for trial, saying that it would amount to double jeopardy for Williams. Following this, prosecutors stated that they planned to appeal the decision to a federal court. On December 2, however, the magazine reported that a judicial panel of three judges in the fourth circuit of the Louisiana Circuit Courts of Appeal had decided that Williams could stand trial again. On June 16, 1986, Williams was found not guilty by the jury in his second trial, resulting in his acquittal.

=== Later developments ===
In December 1985, Judge Oser sentenced Kranz to three months of jail time, 1,500 hours of community service, and a fine of $45,000 ($135,000 in 2025). By that time, Thompson was still awaiting sentencing, while Dominique's trial date had still not yet been set. In September 1986, Bourgeois and Turkel both pleaded guilty to gambling charges as part of a deal that saw their conspiracy and sports bribery charges dropped. Turkel was immediately sentenced to six months of suspension. Ruiz also pleaded guilty.

== Aftermath ==
=== Williams's professional career ===
In June 1985, Williams was selected by the Cleveland Cavaliers of the National Basketball Association in the second round of that year's draft. Prior to the draft, the commissioner of the NBA, David Stern, released a memorandum that said that Williams, who had been projected to be a first-round pick, could be a risky prospect as a result of the lawsuit. Despite his selection, however, he was unable to sign a contract with the team while his lawsuits proceeded, as the association would not allow a member team to sign a player that had pending legal charges regarding point shaving. As a result, Williams instead played for the Rhode Island Gulls of the United States Basketball League in 1985. However, during his trials, George Gund III and Gordon Gund, the Cavaliers' co-owners, paid for Williams's legal expenses. Ultimately, Williams had a 13-year career in the NBA, spending nine years with the Cavaliers.

=== Athletics at Tulane ===
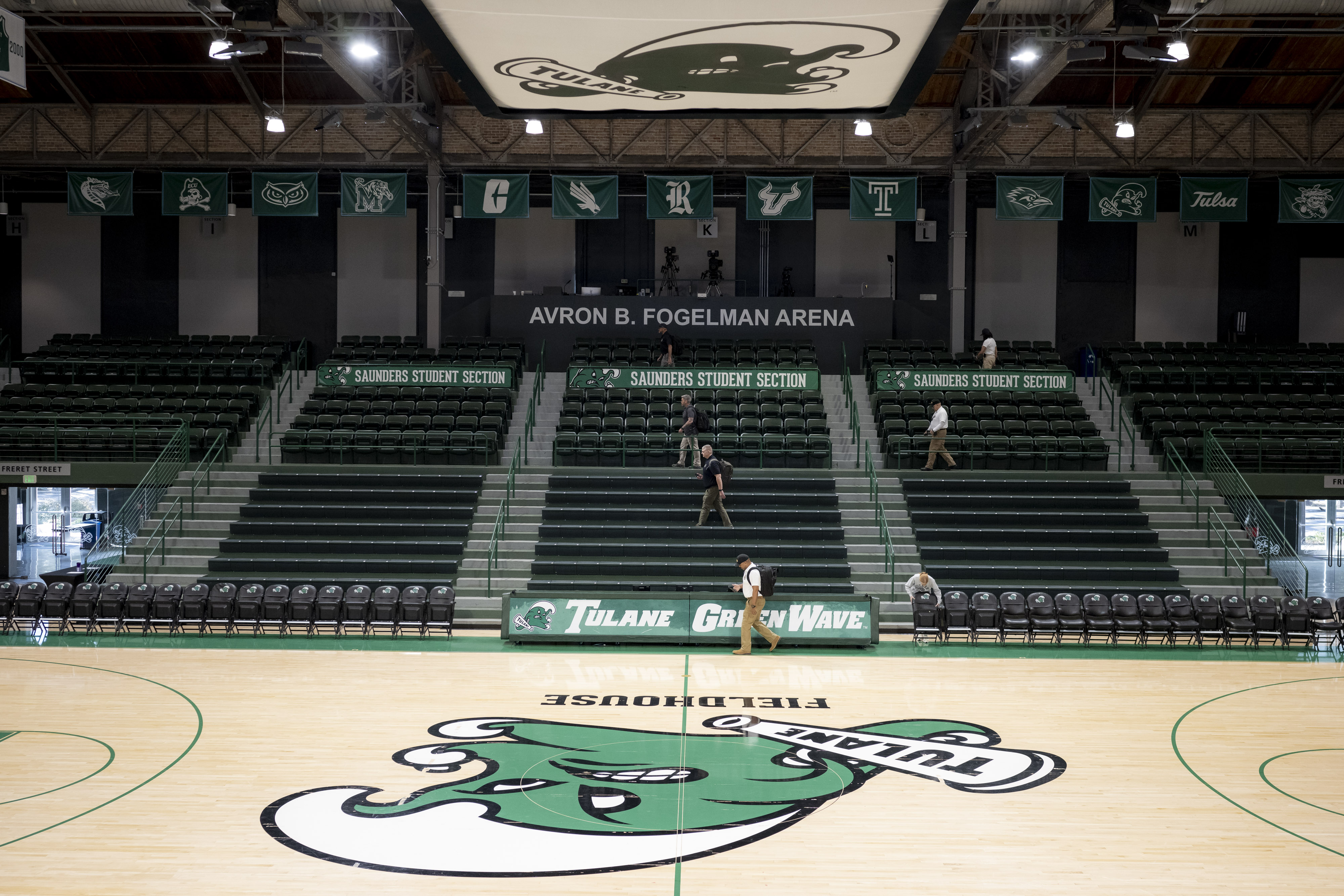
Devlin Fieldhouse, home of the Tulane Green Wave men's basketball team, pictured 2025

President Kelly organized the Select Committee on Intercollegiate Athletics, which was charged with investigating and making recommendations on Tulane's involvement in intercollegiate sports. The committee was chaired by historian Lawrence N. Powell and included students, alumni, faculty, and members of the athletic department among its members. In April 1986, the committee presented its final report, which called for several changes, but stopped short of recommending an abandonment of NCAA Division I status.

The university's decision to voluntarily eliminate its basketball program was not without precedent, as several years earlier, the University of San Francisco had shuttered its basketball program in the wake of a scandal. However, at the time that Tulane was undergoing its scandal, San Francisco was planning to revive its basketball team. Similarly, in 1989, Tulane brought back their basketball program, which would again be affiliated with the Metro Conference. Following the university's announcement, Tulane alumni Avron Fogelman (who was a co-owner of the Kansas City Royals baseball team) stated that he would donate $1 million to the university, with the request that the money be used "to help Tulane's basketball players in the areas of counseling, tutoring, and adjusting to pressures facing today's student-athlete". Perry Clark served as the new head coach.

== Legacy ==
The scandal was one of several to occur during the 1980s, with sportswriter George Vecsey of The New York Times reporting that similar scandals had occurred around the same time at Arizona State University and Clemson University. From a historical perspective, the scandal is one of the most notorious to have ever occurred and has been discussed alongside other historic scandals, including the scandals among several New York area teams and the University of Kentucky during the early 1950s and the 1961 NCAA University Division men's basketball gambling scandal. Later events that have been compared to the scandal include point-shaving schemes at Arizona State University and Northwestern University during the 1990s, with both of these later cases resulting in individuals serving prison sentences for their actions. In a 2023 article in The Athletic, sportswriter Chris Vannini listed the Tulane scandal as among "the most notable betting controversies to hit college sports". According to criminologist Christopher S. Kudlac, Williams was the second most noteworthy college athlete to be implicated in a point shaving scandal, second only to Connie Hawkins. According to academic David J. Leonard, the role of cocaine in the scandal prompted changes to the NCAA's drug policies, with NCAA President John Toner commenting that the combination of drug use and gambling among college athletics was a serious concern to the organization.

== See also ==
- List of match-fixing incidents
- List of sporting scandals

== Bibliography ==
- Andreff, Wladimir (2019). An Economic Roadmap to the Dark Side of Sport. Palgrave Pivots in Sports Economics. Vol. II: Corruption in Sport. Cham, Switzerland: Palgrave Pivot. ISBN 978-3-030-28479-4. OCLC 1121096048.
- Atkins, Larry (2024). Foul or Fair?: Ethical and Social Issues in Sports. Jefferson, North Carolina: McFarland & Company. ISBN 978-1-4766-8621-9. OCLC 1375993860.
- Fields, Sarah K. (2008). "American Sports, 1980–1989". In Nelson, Murry R. (ed.). Encyclopedia of Sports in America: A History from Foot Races to Extreme Sports. Vol. 2: 1940 to Present. Westport, Connecticut: Greenwood Publishing Group. pp. 437–476. ISBN 978-0-313-34791-7.
- Figone, Albert J. (2012). Cheating the Spread: Gamblers, Point Shavers, and Game Fixers in College Football and Basketball. Urbana, Illinois: University of Illinois Press. ISBN 978-0-252-09445-3. OCLC 1176314894.
- Finley, Peter; Finley, Laura; Fountain, Jeffrey (2008). "Tulane University Drops Men's Hoops". Sports Scandals. Scandals in American History. Westport, Connecticut: Greenwood Press. pp. 52–53. ISBN 978-0-313-34459-6. OCLC 234467772.
- Kudlac, Christopher S. (2010). Fair or Foul: Sports and Criminal Behavior in the United States. Santa Barbara, California: Praeger. ISBN 978-0-313-37826-3. OCLC 659564262.
- Leonard, David J. (2017). Playing While White: Privilege and Power on and off the Field. Seattle: University of Washington Press. ISBN 978-0-295-74189-5. OCLC 989063259.
- Malin, L. (2023). "Case 17: Tulane Point-Shaving". In Sanderson, Jimmy (ed.). Corruption and Scandal in American Sports: Causes and Consequences. New York City: Bloomsbury Academic. pp. 107–112. ISBN 978-1-4408-7838-1. OCLC 1393303535.
- Mohr, Clarence L.; Gordon, Joseph E. (2001). Tulane: The Emergence of a Modern University, 1945–1980. Baton Rouge, Louisiana: Louisiana State University Press. ISBN 978-0-8071-2553-3. OCLC 44634243.
- Porter, David (2002) [2000]. Fixed: How Goodfellas Bought Boston College Basketball (First Taylor Trade Publishing paperback ed.). Lanham, Maryland: Taylor Trade Publishing. ISBN 978-1-4616-0087-9. OCLC 820011287.
- Rosen, Charley (1999) [1978]. The Scandals of '51: How the Gamblers Almost Killed College Basketball (First Trade Paperback ed.). New York City: Seven Stories Press. ISBN 978-1-888363-91-3. OCLC 40602879.
- Smith, C. Fraser (1992). Lenny, Lefty, and the Chancellor: The Len Bias Tragedy and the Search for Reform in Big-time College Basketball. Baltimore: Bancroft Press. ISBN 978-1-61088-001-5. OCLC 622288409.
- Smith, Ronald A. (2011). Pay for Play: A History of Big-Time College Athletic Reform. Urbana, Illinois: University of Illinois Press. ISBN 978-0-252-03587-6. OCLC 700709008.
- Teitelbaum, Stanley H. (2005). Sports Heroes, Fallen Idols: How Star Athletes Pursue Self-Destructive Paths and Jeopardize Their Careers. Lincoln, Nebraska: University of Nebraska Press. ISBN 978-0-8032-0539-0. OCLC 61808863.
- Wojciechowski, Gene (2009). "Too Many Fouls". ESPN College Basketball Encyclopedia: The Complete History of the Men's Game. Introduction by Bill Bradley. New York City: ESPN Books and Ballantine Books. pp. 34–39. ISBN 978-0-345-51392-2. OCLC 299706419.
