= 1995–96 Phoenix Suns season =

Professional basketball season

- Head coach: Paul Westphal (fired); Cotton Fitzsimmons
- General manager: Bryan Colangelo
- Owner: Jerry Colangelo
- Arena: America West Arena

Results
- Record: 41–41 (.500)
- Place: Division: 4th (Pacific); Conference: 7th (Western)
- Playoff finish: First round (lost to Spurs 1–3)
- Stats at Basketball Reference

Local media
- Television: KUTP; ASPN
- Radio: KTAR

The 1995–96 Phoenix Suns season was the 28th season for the Phoenix Suns in the National Basketball Association.

== Season summary ==
=== Off-season ===
The Suns had the 21st overall pick in the 1995 NBA draft, and selected shooting guard Michael Finley from the University of Wisconsin. During the off-season, the team acquired Hot Rod Williams from the Cleveland Cavaliers, and signed free agent Tony Smith.

=== Regular season ===
With the addition of Finley and Williams, the Suns got off to a 13–13 start to the regular season, but then lost eight of their next nine games, falling below .500 in winning percentage with a 14–21 record as of January 19, 1996. Head coach Paul Westphal was fired after a 14–19 start to the season, and was replaced with former Suns coach Cotton Fitzsimmons, who came in to coach in his third stint with the team. Under Fitzsimmons, the Suns won 9 of their 13 games in February, and held a 22–24 record at the All-Star break. At mid-season, the team traded Smith to the Miami Heat in exchange for rookie point guard Terrence Rencher. The Suns played above .500 for the remainder of the season, and finished in fourth place in the Pacific Division with a 41–41 record, earning the seventh seed in the Western Conference; the team qualified for the NBA playoffs for the eighth consecutive year.

Charles Barkley averaged 23.2 points, 11.6 rebounds, 3.7 assists and 1.6 steals per game, and was named to the All-NBA Third Team, while Kevin Johnson averaged 18.7 points, 9.2 assists and 1.5 steals per game, but only played 56 games due to hamstring and groin injuries, and Finley provided the team with 15.0 points, 4.6 rebounds and 3.5 assists per game, and was named to the NBA All-Rookie First Team. In addition, sixth man Danny Manning averaged 13.4 points and 4.3 rebounds per game off the bench, but only played just 33 games due to a torn ACL, and sprained ankle, while second-year guard Wesley Person contributed 12.7 points per game, and led the Suns with 117 three-point field goals, and Wayman Tisdale contributed 10.7 points per game off the bench. Meanwhile, Elliott Perry provided with 8.6 points and 4.4 assists per game, A.C. Green contributed 7.5 points and 6.8 rebounds per game, and Hot Rod Williams averaged 7.3 points, 6.0 rebounds and 1.5 blocks per game.

During the NBA All-Star weekend at the Alamodome in San Antonio, Texas, Barkley was selected for the 1996 NBA All-Star Game, as a member of the Western Conference All-Star team; it was his tenth consecutive All-Star selection. Meanwhile, Finley was selected for the NBA Rookie Game, as a member of the Western Conference Rookie team, and also participated in the NBA Slam Dunk Contest. Barkley also finished tied in twelfth place in Most Valuable Player voting, while Finley finished tied in fourth place in Rookie of the Year voting.

The Suns finished eighth in the NBA in home-game attendance, with an attendance of 779,943 at the America West Arena during the regular season. The Suns were also one of the nine teams to defeat the 72–10 Chicago Bulls during the regular season, defeating them by a score of 106–96 at the America West Arena on February 6, 1996.

=== NBA playoffs ===
In the Western Conference First Round of the 1996 NBA playoffs, the Suns faced off against the 2nd–seeded, and Midwest Division champion San Antonio Spurs, who were led by All-Star center David Robinson, All-Star forward Sean Elliott, and Avery Johnson. However, despite playing all 82 games, Finley suffered an ankle injury on the final day of the regular season, and did not play in any of the Suns' playoff games. Without Finley, the Suns lost the first two games to the Spurs on the road at the Alamodome, but managed to win Game 3 at home, 94–93 at the America West Arena. However, the Suns lost Game 4 to the Spurs at home, 116–98, thus losing the series in four games.

=== Aftermath ===
Following the season, Barkley was traded to the Houston Rockets after four seasons with the Suns, while Perry was dealt to the Milwaukee Bucks, and Rencher was released to free agency.

== Offseason ==
=== NBA draft ===
Round	Pick	Player	Position	Nationality	College
1	21	Michael Finley	Guard/Forward	United States	Wisconsin
1	27	Mario Bennett	Forward	United States	Arizona State
2	56	Chris Carr	Guard	United States	Southern Illinois

The Suns received the 21st pick from a trade with the Los Angeles Lakers in 1994. With the pick they would select future All-Star swingman Michael Finley from Wisconsin. Finley averaged 18.7 points, 5.6 rebounds and 3.2 assists per game in four years with the Badgers. On October 4, the Suns signed Finley to a three-year rookie contract for $2.17 million. In his rookie season, Finley would average 15.0 points, 4.6 rebounds, 3.5 assists and 1.0 steal per game, earning NBA All-Rookie First Team honors. Finley was traded to the Dallas Mavericks midway through his sophomore season for All-Star point guard Jason Kidd.

The Suns used their first-round pick to select small forward Mario Bennett from Arizona State. Bennett averaged 15.7 points and 7.8 rebounds per game in three years with the Sun Devils. On October 4, the Suns signed Bennett to a three-year rookie contract for $1.66 million. Bennett underwent knee surgery before the season and remained on the injured reserve until March 1. Bennett would appear in just 19 regular season games, starting in 14 due to injuries, and two playoff games before being waived prior to the 1996–97 season.

The Suns used their second-round pick to select shooting guard Chris Carr from Southern Illinois. Carr averaged 13.5 points and 5.8 rebounds per game in three years with the Salukis. On October 2, the Suns signed Carr to a one-year rookie contract for $200,000. Carr appeared in 60 regular season games, starting in ten, and three playoff games. Carr would sign as a free agent with the Minnesota Timberwolves after the season.

== Roster ==
1995–96 Phoenix Suns roster
Players

Pos.	No.	Player	Height	Weight	DOB	From
F	34	Charles Barkley	6 ft 6 in (1.98 m)	252 lb (114 kg)	1963–02–20	Auburn
F	8	Mario Bennett	6 ft 6 in (1.98 m)	235 lb (107 kg)	1973–08–01	Arizona State
G	43	Chris Carr	6 ft 5 in (1.96 m)	207 lb (94 kg)	1974–03–12	Southern Illinois
C	40	John Coker	7 ft 0 in (2.13 m)	253 lb (115 kg)	1971–10–28	Boise State
G/F	4	Michael Finley	6 ft 7 in (2.01 m)	215 lb (98 kg)	1973–03–06	Wisconsin
F	45	A.C. Green	6 ft 9 in (2.06 m)	220 lb (100 kg)	1963–10–04	Oregon State
G	7	Kevin Johnson	6 ft 1 in (1.85 m)	180 lb (82 kg)	1966–03–04	California
C	35	Joe Kleine	6 ft 11 in (2.11 m)	255 lb (116 kg)	1962–01–04	Arkansas
F	15	Danny Manning	6 ft 10 in (2.08 m)	230 lb (104 kg)	1966–05–17	Kansas
G	2	Elliot Perry	6 ft 0 in (1.83 m)	150 lb (68 kg)	1969–03–28	Memphis
G/F	11	Wesley Person	6 ft 6 in (1.98 m)	195 lb (88 kg)	1971–03–28	Auburn
G	14	Terrence Rencher	6 ft 3 in (1.91 m)	185 lb (84 kg)	1973–02–19	Texas
F	23	Wayman Tisdale	6 ft 9 in (2.06 m)	240 lb (109 kg)	1964–06–09	Oklahoma
C	18	Hot Rod Williams	6 ft 11 in (2.11 m)	215 lb (98 kg)	1962–08–09	Tulane

Coaches
Head coach
- Paul Westphal (fired)
- Cotton Fitzsimmons
Assistant(s)
- Paul Silas
- Donnie Nelson

Legend
- (DP) Unsigned draft pick
- (FA) Free agent
- (S) Suspended
- Injured

Roster
Updated: February 22, 1996

== Regular season ==
=== Standings ===
Pacific Division	W	L	PCT	GB	Home	Road	Div
c-Seattle SuperSonics	64	18	.780	–	38–3	26–15	21–3
x-Los Angeles Lakers	53	29	.646	11	30–11	23–18	17–7
x-Portland Trail Blazers	44	38	.537	20	26–15	18–23	11–13
x-Phoenix Suns	41	41	.500	23	25–16	16–25	9–15
x-Sacramento Kings	39	43	.476	25	26–15	13–28	11–13
Golden State Warriors	36	46	.439	28	23–18	13–28	7–17
Los Angeles Clippers	29	53	.354	35	19–22	10–31	7–17

Western Conference
#	Team	W	L	PCT	GB	GP
1	c-Seattle SuperSonics *	64	18	.780	–	82
2	y-San Antonio Spurs *	59	23	.720	5	82
3	x-Utah Jazz	55	27	.671	9	82
4	x-Los Angeles Lakers	53	29	.646	11	82
5	x-Houston Rockets	48	34	.585	16	82
6	x-Portland Trail Blazers	44	38	.537	20	82
7	x-Phoenix Suns	41	41	.500	23	82
8	x-Sacramento Kings	39	43	.476	25	82
9	Golden State Warriors	36	46	.439	28	82
10	Denver Nuggets	35	47	.427	29	82
11	Los Angeles Clippers	29	53	.354	35	82
12	Minnesota Timberwolves	26	56	.317	38	82
13	Dallas Mavericks	26	56	.317	38	82
14	Vancouver Grizzlies	15	67	.183	49	82

== Playoffs ==
=== Game log ===
1996 playoff game log
First Round: 1–3 (home: 1–1; road: 0–2)

Game	Date	Team	Score	High points	High rebounds	High assists	Location Attendance	Series
1	April 26	@ San Antonio	L 98–120	Charles Barkley (26)	Charles Barkley (12)	Kevin Johnson (11)	Alamodome; 16,545	0–1
2	April 28	@ San Antonio	L 105–110	Charles Barkley (30)	Charles Barkley (20)	Kevin Johnson (16)	Alamodome; 19,507	0–2
3	May 1	San Antonio	W 94–93	Charles Barkley (25)	Charles Barkley (13)	Kevin Johnson (8)	America West Arena; 19,023	1–2
4	May 3	San Antonio	L 98–116	Charles Barkley (21)	Charles Barkley (9)	Kevin Johnson (8)	America West Arena; 19,023	1–3

1996 schedule

== Awards and honors ==
=== Week/Month ===
- Kevin Johnson was named Player of the Week for games played April 1 through April 7.
- Charles Barkley was named Player of the Month for February.

=== All-Star ===
- Charles Barkley was voted as a starter for the Western Conference in the All-Star Game. It was his tenth consecutive All-Star selection. Barkley finished first in voting among Western Conference players with 1,268,195 votes.
- Other Suns players receiving All-Star votes were: A.C. Green (269,175).
- Michael Finley was selected to compete in the Slam Dunk Contest. Finley finished second, losing to champion Brent Barry in the final round.
- Michael Finley was selected to compete for the Western Conference in the Rookie Challenge.

=== Season ===
- Charles Barkley was named to the All-NBA Third Team. Barkley also finished 12th in MVP voting.
- Michael Finley was named to the NBA All-Rookie First Team. Finley also finished tied in fourth in Rookie of the Year voting.

== Injuries/Missed Games ==
- 10/31/95: Mario Bennett: Knee chondromalacia; placed on injured reserve until March 1
- 10/31/95: John Coker: Foot stress fracture; placed on injured reserve until March 8
- 10/31/95: Danny Manning: Torn ACL; placed on injured list until February 1
- 11/10/95: Kevin Johnson: Strained knee tendon; out until November 18
- 11/27/95: Wayman Tisdale: Sore shoulder; did not play
- 12/02/95: Kevin Johnson: Sore hamstring; did not play
- 12/08/95: Charles Barkley: Flu; did not play
- 12/08/95: Elliot Perry: Bruised lower back; did not play
- 12/16/95: Kevin Johnson: Strained groin; out until January 21
- 12/16/95: Stefano Rusconi: Flu; did not play
- 12/19/95: Hot Rod Williams: Sprained knee; out until December 27
- 01/04/96: Stefano Rusconi: Injured achilles tendon; out until waived on January 31
- 01/09/96: Charles Barkley: Sore toe; out until January 21
- 01/09/96: Hot Rod Williams: Leg nerve irritation; out until January 28
- 02/08/96: Kevin Johnson: Strained hamstring, strained groin; out until February 19
- 02/13/96: Wayman Tisdale: Injured eye; did not play
- 03/01/96: Terrence Rencher: Sprained ankle; placed on injured list until April 22
- 03/07/96: Wayman Tisdale: Bruised shoulder; did not play
- 03/08/96: Wayman Tisdale: Strained shoulder; placed on injured list until March 29
- 03/13/96: Danny Manning: Sprained ankle; out until March 21
- 03/29/96: John Coker: Sore foot, placed on injured list until April 22
- 04/02/96: Mario Bennett: Flu; out until April 10
- 04/07/96: Danny Manning: Knee tendinitis; out until April 16
- 04/10/96: Hot Rod Williams: Injured hand, wrist, foot; out until April 19
- 04/14/96: Joe Kleine: Fainting spell; out until April 26
- 04/16/96: Charles Barkley: Strained calf; out until April 26
- 04/21/96: Kevin Johnson: Strained calf; did not play
- 04/26/96: Michael Finley: Sprained ankle; did not play
- 04/28/96: Michael Finley: Sprained ankle; did not play
- 05/01/96: Michael Finley: Sprained ankle; did not play
- 05/03/96: Michael Finley: Sprained ankle; did not play

== Player statistics ==
Legend
GP	Games played	GS	Games started	MPG	Minutes per game
FG%	Field-goal percentage	3P%	3-point field-goal percentage	FT%	Free-throw percentage
RPG	Rebounds per game	APG	Assists per game	SPG	Steals per game
BPG	Blocks per game	PPG	Points per game

=== Season ===
Player	GP	GS	MPG	FG%	3P%	FT%	RPG	APG	SPG	BPG	PPG
Charles Barkley	71	71	37.1	.500	.280	.777	11.6	3.7	1.6	.8	23.2
Mario Bennett	19	14	12.1	.453	.000	.643	2.6	0.3	.6	.6	4.5
Chris Carr	60	10	9.8	.415	.262	.817	1.7	0.7	.2	.1	4.0
John Coker	5	0	2.2	.800†	.	.	0.4	0.2	.0	.2	1.6
Michael Finley	82	72	39.2	.476	.328	.749	4.6	3.5	1.0	.4	15.0
A.C. Green	82	36	25.8	.484	.269	.709	6.8	0.9	.5	.3	7.5
Kevin Johnson	56	55	35.8	.507†	.368	.859#	3.9	9.2	1.5	.2	18.7
Joe Kleine	56	9	11.8	.420	.286	.800	2.4	0.8	.2	.1	2.9
Danny Manning	33	4	24.7	.459	.214	.752	4.3	2.0	1.2	.7	13.4
Elliot Perry	81	26	20.6	.475	.407^	.778	1.7	4.4	1.1	.1	8.6
Wesley Person	82	47	31.8	.445	.374^	.771	3.9	1.7	.7	.3	12.7
Terrence Rencher*	2	0	4.0	1.000†	.	.333	1.0	0.0	.0	.5	1.5
Stefano Rusconi	7	0	4.3	.333	.	.400	0.9	0.4	.0	.3	1.1
Tony Smith*	34	2	15.5	.405	.325	.649	1.6	2.5	.6	.1	5.6
Wayman Tisdale	63	6	18.3	.495	.	.765	3.4	0.9	.2	.6	10.7
Hot Rod Williams	62	58	26.6	.453	.000	.731	6.0	1.0	.7	1.5	7.3
David Wood*	4	0	8.5	.167	.	1.000#	1.3	0.5	.3	.0	1.0

* – Stats with the Suns.
† – Minimum 300 field goals made.
^ – Minimum 82 three-pointers made.
# – Minimum 125 free-throws made.

=== Playoffs ===
Player	GP	GS	MPG	FG%	3P%	FT%	RPG	APG	SPG	BPG	PPG
Charles Barkley	4	4	41.0	.443	.250	.787	13.5	3.8	1.0	1.0	25.5
Mario Bennett	2	0	4.0	.500	.	.	1.5	0.0	.0	.0	2.0
Chris Carr	3	0	12.0	.643	.667	.800	2.3	1.3	.7	.3	8.0
A.C. Green	4	4	21.8	.353	.000	.875	4.5	0.5	.3	.0	4.8
Kevin Johnson	4	4	37.8	.474	.250	.824	4.3	10.8	.5	.5	17.3
Joe Kleine	2	0	4.0	.000	.	.	0.5	0.0	.5	.0	0.0
Danny Manning	4	0	22.5	.458	.000	.625	2.8	1.3	1.0	.3	12.3
Elliot Perry	4	0	12.8	.500	.	.000	0.5	3.0	.5	.0	3.5
Wesley Person	4	4	45.8	.393	.310	.800	5.8	0.8	.8	.3	14.3
Wayman Tisdale	4	0	16.8	.333	.	.500	1.0	0.5	.3	.3	5.3
Hot Rod Williams	4	4	28.8	.438	.	.667	6.5	0.3	.0	1.8	9.0

Player statistics citation:

== Transactions ==
=== Trades ===
October 7, 1995	To Cleveland Cavaliers (United States) Dan Majerle (United States) Antonio Lang 1997 first-round draft pick ( (United States) Brevin Knight)	To Phoenix Suns (United States) John "Hot Rod" Williams
February 22, 1996	To Miami Heat (United States) Tony Smith	To Phoenix Suns (United States) Terrence Rencher

=== Free agents ===
==== Additions ====
Date	Player	Contract	Former Team
June 15, 1995	Stefano Rusconi	Signed multi-year contract	Benetton Treviso
September 22, 1995	Elliot Perry	Signed 6-year contract for $12 million	Phoenix Suns
September 25, 1995	John Coker	Undisclosed	Boise State Broncos
October 3, 1995	Orlando Smart	Undisclosed	
October 3, 1995	Steve Turner	Undisclosed	
October 4, 1995	Isaac Burton	Undisclosed	
October 4, 1995	Wayman Tisdale	Signed 2-year contract for $6.65 million	Phoenix Suns
October 12, 1995	Danny Manning	Signed 6-year contract for $40 million	Phoenix Suns
November 1, 1995	Tony Smith	Signed 1-year contract for $500,000	Los Angeles Lakers
January 18, 1996	David Wood	Signed 10-day contract	Golden State Warriors

==== Subtractions ====
Date	Player	Reason left	New team
June 24, 1995	Trevor Ruffin	Expansion draft	Vancouver Grizzlies
September 18, 1995	Danny Ainge	Retired	—N/a (Retired)
October 15, 1995	Isaac Burton	Waived	
October 15, 1995	Steve Turner	Waived	
November 2, 1995	Orlando Smart	Waived	
January 28, 1996	David Wood	10-day contract expired	Dallas Mavericks
January 31, 1996	Stefano Rusconi	Waived	Benetton Treviso

Player transactions citation:
