= Silverdale, Washington =

- Unincorporated community Census-designated place
- Location of Silverdale, Washington
- Coordinates: 47°39′59″N 122°40′58″W
- Country: United States
- State: Washington
- County: Kitsap

Area
  - Total: 13.6 sq mi (35.2 km^{2})
  - Land: 12.6 sq mi (32.7 km^{2})
  - Water: 0.97 sq mi (2.5 km^{2})
- Elevation: 52 ft (16 m)

Population (2020)
  - Total: 20,733
  - Density: 1,642.2/sq mi (634.04/km^{2})
- Time zone: UTC-8 (Pacific (PST))
  - Summer (DST): UTC-7 (PDT)
- ZIP Codes: 98315, 98383
- Area code(s): 360, 564
- FIPS code: 53-64365
- GNIS feature ID: 2408740

Silverdale is an unincorporated community in Kitsap County, Washington, in the United States. Despite many attempts at incorporation, Silverdale has not become a city. The population was 20,733 at the 2020 census. For statistical purposes, the United States Census Bureau has defined Silverdale as a census-designated place (CDP).

Silverdale ranks 158th among 522 areas in Washington for which per capita income data is collected.

== History ==
Early attempts to incorporate Silverdale as a city resulted in failed ballot measures in 1941 and 1985. An incorporation referendum in November 1999 was initially defeated by a five-vote margin out of 4,000 votes cast. The election was marred by irregularities, including the inclusion of the ballot question for voters outside the proposed city boundaries and exclusion for voters inside the proposed boundaries. A re-vote was held on February 1, 2000, and rejected by a wider margin. A similar measure in February 2013 was rejected by 70% of voters.

== Geography ==
Silverdale is 6 miles (10 km) south of the US Navy Trident Missile Base Kitsap, 9 miles (14 km) northwest of the city of Bremerton and the same distance south of Poulsbo. Silverdale lies at the north tip of Dyes Inlet, which connects it to Bremerton via Sinclair Inlet and to the Pacific Ocean via Port Orchard and Puget Sound. Strawberry Creek flows through the Old Town area.

According to the United States Census Bureau, the CDP of Silverdale has a total area of 13.6 square miles (35.2 km^{2}), of which 12.6 square miles (32.7 km^{2}) are land and 0.97 square miles (2.5 km^{2}), or 7.10%, are water.

== Demographics ==
Historical population
Census	Pop.	Note	%±
1990	7,660		—
2000	15,816		106.5%
2010	19,204		21.4%
2020	20,733		8.0%

=== 2020 census ===
As of the 2020 census, Silverdale had a population of 20,733. The median age was 37.3 years. 20.0% of residents were under the age of 18 and 17.7% of residents were 65 years of age or older. For every 100 females there were 99.3 males, and for every 100 females age 18 and over there were 97.6 males age 18 and over.

100.0% of residents lived in urban areas, while 0.0% lived in rural areas.

There were 8,393 households in Silverdale, of which 26.8% had children under the age of 18 living in them. Of all households, 51.1% were married-couple households, 18.9% were households with a male householder and no spouse or partner present, and 23.7% were households with a female householder and no spouse or partner present. About 29.2% of all households were made up of individuals and 12.6% had someone living alone who was 65 years of age or older.

There were 8,788 housing units, of which 4.5% were vacant. The homeowner vacancy rate was 0.8% and the rental vacancy rate was 6.2%.

Racial composition as of the 2020 census
Race	Number	Percent
White	13,899	67.0%
Black or African American	701	3.4%
American Indian and Alaska Native	195	0.9%
Asian	2,224	10.7%
Native Hawaiian and Other Pacific Islander	258	1.2%
Some other race	695	3.4%
Two or more races	2,761	13.3%
Hispanic or Latino (of any race)	2,133	10.3%

== Commerce ==
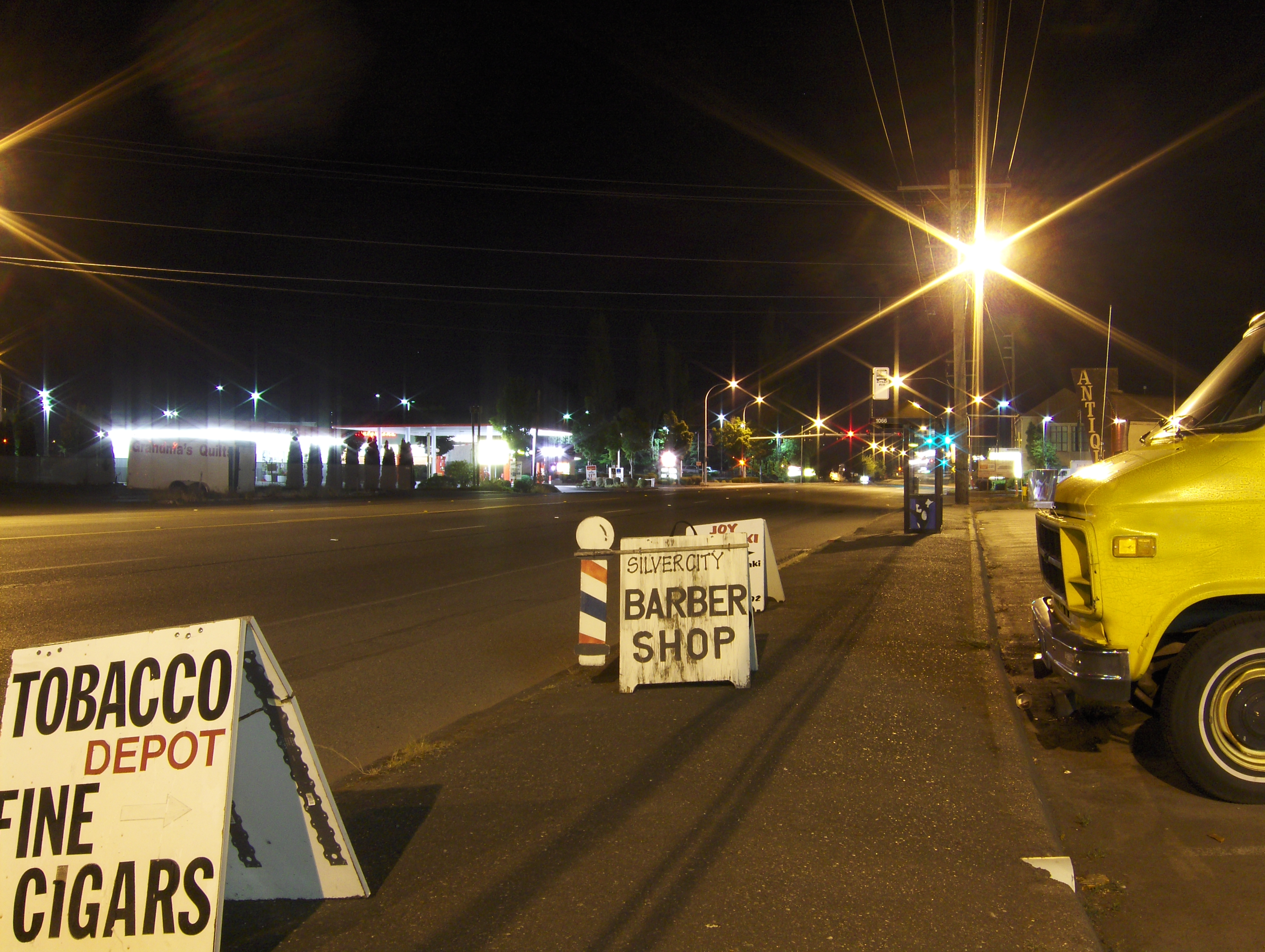
Silverdale Way is Silverdale's main commercial strip.

Commerce in Silverdale is primarily divided into two geographic areas: Old Town Silverdale along the northeast edge of Dyes Inlet, and the area just north within SR 3 and SR 303 featuring Kitsap Mall, and other big box stores. In addition to the Port of Silverdale, Old Town Silverdale is home to many salons, restaurants, and medical offices.

== Education ==
=== Public schools ===
Central Kitsap School District serves about 11,243 students from kindergarten through grade 12 (2022–2023). The district has two high schools serving grades 9 to 12, one secondary school serving grades 7 to 12, three middle schools serving grades six to eight, three satellite programs, 12 elementary schools, and a home-school support program. In addition, the district offers both junior high- and high school-level alternative programs. The overall graduation rate as of 2021-2022 is 87%, above the statewide rate of 82%.

On September 8, 2017, construction began on the new Central Kitsap Campus which now houses Central Kitsap High School and Central Kitsap Middle School. The past buildings were built in 1942 and 1959 respectively. It is expected that middle school students will be able to move into the new building in Spring 2019 while high school students will move in Fall 2019. Construction for the new campus was contracted through Skanksa for $77.9 million. Central Kitsap School District sold the naming rights to the new campus' stadium to Kitsap Credit Union for $500,000. The stadium will be named "Kitsap Credit Union Athletic Complex."

== Healthcare ==
A branch of what was then, Harrison Medical Center, now St. Michael Medical Center, opened on Myhre Road in 2000. St. Michael Medical Center is a part of Virginia Mason Franciscan Health, under Catholic Health Initiatives (CHI). A new expansion to St. Michael Medical Center was completed and opened to the public in December 2020. The hospital features a Level III Trauma Center and helipad, birth center, and cancer care. St. Michael Medical Center is in America's 50 Best Hospitals for cardiac surgery (2021).

St. Michael Medical Center is the only one of two hospitals on the Kitsap Peninsula, St. Anthony Hospital in Gig Harbor, Washington, being the other. In 2022 staffing issues have been a major ongoing issue at the hospital.

== Notable people ==
- Tarn Adams, creator of Dwarf Fortress
- John Coker, former NBA center, graduated from Olympic High School
- Ben Gibbard, vocalist and guitarist for the band Death Cab For Cutie, graduated from Olympic High School
- Mike Herrera, vocalist and bass guitarist for the band MxPx, graduated from Central Kitsap High School
- Steven Holl, world-renowned architect, graduated from Bremerton High School
- Todd Linden, MLB outfielder for the Cleveland Indians, graduated from Central Kitsap High School
- Christian Welp, former NBA center, graduated from Olympic High School
