= CKHS =

CKHS may refer to:

- Central Kitsap High School, Silverdale, Washington, United States
- Chembur Karnatak High School, Mumbai, India
- Crozer-Keystone Health System, based in Delaware County, Pennsylvania, United States
