= Klahowya Secondary School =

Coordinates: 47°37′43″N 122°45′15″W

Location
- 7607 NW Newberry Hill Road; Silverdale, Washington; United States

Information
- Type: Secondary school
- Established: 1997
- School district: Central Kitsap School District
- Principal: Meghan Rubman
- Teaching staff: 49.78 (2023-24) (FTE)
- Grades: 6–12
- Enrollment: 1,028 (2024–25)
- Student to teacher ratio: 19.63 (2023-24)
- Colors: Green, White, Black
- Mascot: Eagle
- Rivals: Central Kitsap High School, Olympic High School
- Yearbook: Wehali
- Website: klahowya.ckschools.org
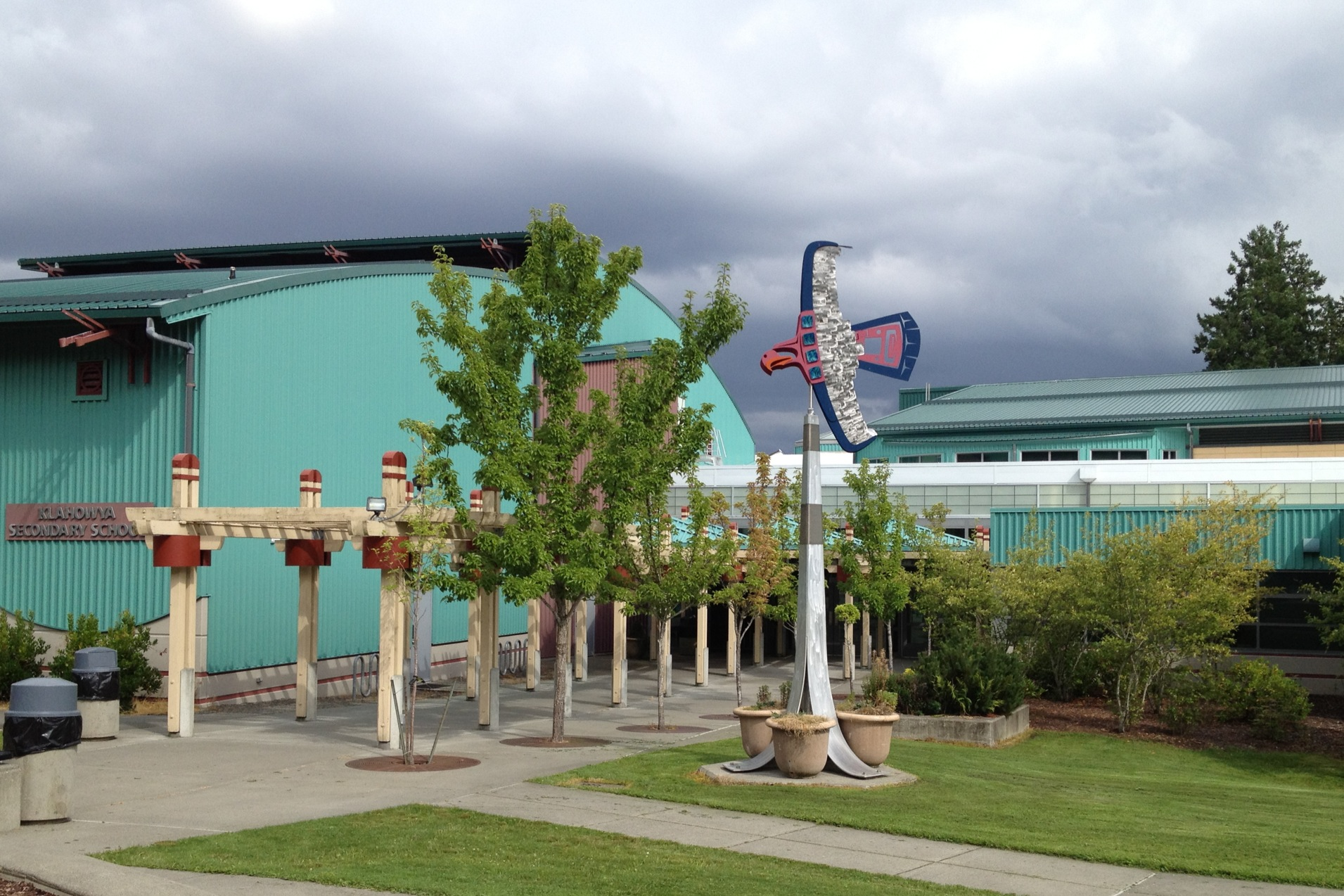
- Klahowya Secondary School, c. 2012

Klahowya Secondary School (or KSS) is a public secondary school located in Silverdale, Washington. It was established in 1997 as part of Central Kitsap School District. Klahowya Secondary School was constructed in 1996–1997 as a 133,715 square foot facility with 34 classrooms, 13 labs, a gym, auditorium, and library for grades 6–12.

== History ==
The school was named for the Chinook Jargon word "klahowya", which means "welcome". It was planned in the 1990s and opened in 1997. Originally scheduled to open in 1996, it was delayed for another year. Serving grades 6-12 (after 2016), it was the third high school in Central Kitsap School District. The first senior class graduated in 1999. In 2016, the school expanded to include sixth graders. Two years later, a new wing, auxiliary gymnasium, 13 classrooms, three laboratories, a fitness room and a second music room were opened as part of a 45,300 square feet (4,210 m^{2}) addition. A new track and field stadium was also added. On March 13, 2020, Klahowya remained closed due to the COVID-19 pandemic. On February 27, 2025, a ceremony was held to reveal a sign that belonged to the know retired MV Klahowya, a Washington State Ferry vessel that operated from 1958 to 2017. The 7-foot-long sign was gifted by WSF to the school after school officials thought of the possibility of obtaining the sign and now hangs over the main offices entryway.

=== Incidents ===
On March 8, 2019, a bomb scare occurred when a student brought an object with the word "dynamite" labeled on it to the office causing a lockdown to happen. Deputies later confirmed the object was a remote control car battery the student found at a park and posed no danger.

On February 11, 2022, a protest occurred in the commons against the mask mandate. The students remained there the whole school day.

On May 18, 2022, a lockdown occurred when a student was found in the parking lot with a handgun. The student was eventually arrested a short time later and the lockdown was lifted later that morning.

In June 2023, students wore shirts saying “There are only two genders” and were taken to the office by a teacher. Also, an American flag was taken down on Flag Day, but a pride flag remained. The shirts didn't violate any rules and were deemed freedom of speech.

== Demographics ==
In the 2024–2025 school year, 51.8% of the students at KSS were male, 47.8% were female, and 0.5% were Gender X. 0.5% were Native American, 2.4% were Asian, 0.4% were Native Hawaiian/Other Pacific Islander, 8.7% were Hispanic/Latino, 1.2% were Black/African American, 74.4% were White, and 12.5% were Two or More Races.

== Athletics ==
Sport at KSS include:

Middle School

- Fall: Track, Fastpitch softball
- Winter: Boys Basketball, Girls Soccer, Girls Basketball, Wrestling
- Spring: Football, Volleyball, Cross Country

High School

- Fall: Cross Country, Football, Girls Soccer, Girls Swimming, Boys Tennis, Volleyball
- Winter: Boys Basketball, Girls Basketball, Bowling, Boys Swimming, Wrestling
- Spring: Baseball, Fastpitch softball, Golf, Boys Soccer, Girls Tennis, Track & Field, Boys Lacrosse, Girls Lacrosse

The Klahowya football team played at Lumen Field on September 17, 2022, against Tenino High School.

== Etymology ==
"Klahowya” is Chinook Jargon. It is pronounced "Kluh-HOW-yuh", meaning “welcome.”
