= Ned Fowler =

American basketball coach (born 1944)

Ned Fowler (born January 16, 1944) is a retired American college basketball coach.

He is a graduate of East Texas State University. His first experience as a head coach was five years at Richard King High School from 1969 to 1974. He served in a similar capacity at Tyler Junior College (TJC) for seven seasons from 1974 to 1981. The Apaches had a 31–4 record and were ranked third in the final National Junior College Athletic Association men's basketball rankings in Fowler's last campaign at TJC.

He succeeded Roy Danforth as head coach at Tulane University on March 17, 1981. He resigned from his position on April 4, 1985 amid allegations of National Collegiate Athletic Association (NCAA) rules violations involving cash payments to his players. New Orleans lawyer and volunteer district attorney Edward F. Kohnke said about Fowler, "His was the sin of caring. If a politician had done what he did, he would have been returned to office." The university cancelled the men's basketball program that same day as a result of a point shaving scandal involving five Green Wave players including John "Hot Rod" Williams, to which Fowler was oblivious. Green Wave men's basketball wouldn't return until the 1989–90 season.

He stayed in New Orleans for two more years, working in real estate development and insurance for Tulane alumni. He returned to college basketball upon being named an assistant coach on Sonny Smith's staff at Auburn University on July 23, 1987. He coordinated the Tigers' defense.

Fowler returned to head coaching at Stephen F. Austin State University where he served for six years from 1990 to 1996. He was fired on March 18, 1996 despite the Lumberjacks having its best season during his tenure with a 17–11 overall record, 11–7 in Southland Conference play.

== Head coaching record ==
Record table
Season	Team	Overall	Conference	Standing	Postseason
Tulane Green Wave (Metro Conference) (1981–1985)
1981–82	Tulane	19–9	8–4	2nd	NIT Quarterfinals
1982–83	Tulane	19–12	7–5	2nd	NIT First Round
1983–84	Tulane	17–11	7–7	5th	
1984–85	Tulane	15–13	6–8	4th	
Tulane:		70–45	28–24		
Stephen F. Austin Lumberjacks (Southland Conference) (1990–1996)
1990–91	Stephen F. Austin	11–17	6–8	4th	
1991–92	Stephen F. Austin	15–13	10–8	6th	
1992–93	Stephen F. Austin	12–14	8–10	7th	
1993–94	Stephen F. Austin	9–18	6–12	9th	
1994–95	Stephen F. Austin	14–14	9–9	5th	
1995–96	Stephen F. Austin	17–11	11–7	4th	
Stephen F. Austin:		78–87	50–54		
Total:		148–132			
National champion Postseason invitational champion Conference regular season champion Conference regular season and conference tournament champion Division regular season champion Division regular season and conference tournament champion Conference tournament champion

== See also ==
- 1985 Tulane University basketball point-shaving scandal
