= Central Kitsap School District =

School district in Kitsap County, Washington

Coordinates: 47°39′05″N 122°41′28″W

Central Kitsap School District 401 is a public school district in Kitsap County, Washington, United States. It serves unincorporated portions of the county, including the community of Silverdale, and portions of the City of Bremerton. As of June 2014, the district has an enrollment of 11,091 students. Approximately one-quarter of students are from military families, and one half are from families economically dependent on the US Navy. It consists of CK High and Middle school, Klahowya, and other schools like Ridgetop Middle or Fairview Middle

== Superintendent and history ==
As of November 2026, the superintendent of Central Kitsap School District is Dr. Erin Prince. Originally, when CKSD was founded in 1941, the main high school was Port Washington Bay Union High School. Many of the elementary schools were small schoolhouses, and Kitsap County had its own superintendent. Eventually in 2014, David McVicker was the superintendent.

== Schools ==
=== High schools ===
- Central Kitsap High School (Silverdale)
- Klahowya Secondary School (Grades 6-12) (Silverdale)
- Olympic High School (Bremerton)

=== Middle schools ===
- Central Kitsap Middle School (Silverdale)
- Fairview Middle School (Bremerton)
- Ridgetop Middle School (Silverdale)

=== Elementary schools ===
- Brownsville Elementary (Bremerton)
- Clear Creek Elementary (Silverdale; near Bangor)
- Cottonwood Elementary (Bremerton)
- Cougar Valley Elementary (Silverdale)
- Emerald Heights Elementary (Silverdale)
- Esquire Hills Elementary (Bremerton)
- Green Mountain Elementary (Bremerton)
- Hawk Elementary at Jackson Park (Bremerton)
- Pinecrest Elementary (Bremerton)
- Silverdale Elementary (Silverdale)
- Silver Ridge Elementary (Silverdale)
- Woodlands Elementary (Bremerton)

=== K-12 Community School ===
- Barker Creek Community School (Bremerton)
