= Malcolm DeWalt =

American football player (born 2002)

No. 36 – Carolina Panthers
- Position: Cornerback
- Roster status: Active

Personal information
- Born: January 4, 2002 (age 24); Bremerton, Washington, U.S.
- Listed height: 6 ft 2 in (1.88 m)
- Listed weight: 190 lb (86 kg)

Career information
- High school: Olympic (Bremerton)
- College: Snow (2022); Butte (2023); Akron (2024–2025)
- NFL draft: 2026: undrafted

Career history
- Atlanta Falcons (2026); Carolina Panthers (2026–present)

Career NFL statistics as of Week 8, 2026
- Total tackles: 1
- Stats at Pro Football Reference

Malcolm DeWalt IV (born January 4, 2002) is an American professional football cornerback for the Carolina Panthers of the National Football League (NFL). He played college football for Akron, Butte College and Snow College.

== Early life and high school ==
DeWalt was born on January 4, 2002, in Bremerton, Washington, to Avantee Dozier and Malcolm DeWalt III. He attended Olympic High School, graduating in 2020 as a two-star recruit.

== College career ==
DeWalt began his college career at Snow College in 2022, recording 24 tackles and seven pass breakups in 10 games. He transferred to Butte College in 2023, where he had 38 tackles, four interceptions, and 12 pass breakups. He then transferred to Akron, appearing in 11 games with one start in 2024. He became a starter in 2025, finishing the season with 40 solo tackles, a forced fumble, and two interceptions, one of which he returned for a touchdown.

== Professional career ==
Pre-draft measurables
Height	Weight	Arm length	Hand span	Wingspan	40-yard dash	10-yard split	20-yard split	20-yard shuttle	Three-cone drill	Vertical jump	Broad jump	Bench press
6 ft 0 1/2 in (1.84 m)	197 lb (89 kg)	32 7/8 in (0.84 m)	9 1/2 in (0.24 m)	6 ft 5 3/4 in (1.97 m)	4.38 s	1.46 s	2.52 s	4.26 s	7.19 s	36.0 in (0.91 m)	10 ft 0 in (3.05 m)	14 reps
All values from Pro Day

=== Atlanta Falcons ===
After going undrafted in the 2026 NFL draft, DeWalt signed with the Atlanta Falcons as an undrafted free agent on May 7, 2026. After making the initial 53-man roster and being inactive for the first six games, he was waived on October 22.

=== Carolina Panthers ===
On October 24, 2026, DeWalt was signed to the Carolina Panthers' practice squad. He was signed to the active roster on October 29.
