= The Gonzales Weekly Citizen =

- Type: Weekly newspaper
- Format: Broadsheet
- Owner: USA Today Co.
- Editor: Scott Anderson
- Founded: 1920 (as The Gonzales Weekly)
- Headquarters: Gonzales, Louisiana
- Circulation: 1,600
- Website: weeklycitizen.com

The Gonzales Weekly Citizen is a weekly newspaper published every Thursday in Gonzales, Louisiana by GateHouse Media.

The Gonzales Weekly Citizen has served as the official journal for several entities, including Ascension Parish government, the Ascension Parish Sheriff's Office, the City of Gonzales and the Town of Sorrento, Louisiana.

The Gonzales Weekly Citizen is a member of the Louisiana Press Association. The circulation is estimated to be 1,600.

The newspaper has received several Louisiana Press Association awards. The newspaper also has received recognition for its assistance with the parish's volunteer organization.

== History ==
The Gonzales Weekly Citizen covers local news throughout Ascension Parish and the surrounding area. The Ascension Citizen was founded by Mark Anderson in 1996 as a competitor of the other Ascension Parish newspapers, The Gonzales Weekly and The Donaldsonville Chief, and within its first few years circulation surpassed 10,000. It became the Gonzales Weekly Citizen in 2007 when The Gonzales Weekly (founded in 1920) merged with The Ascension Citizen (founded in 1996).
