= Barker Creek Community School =

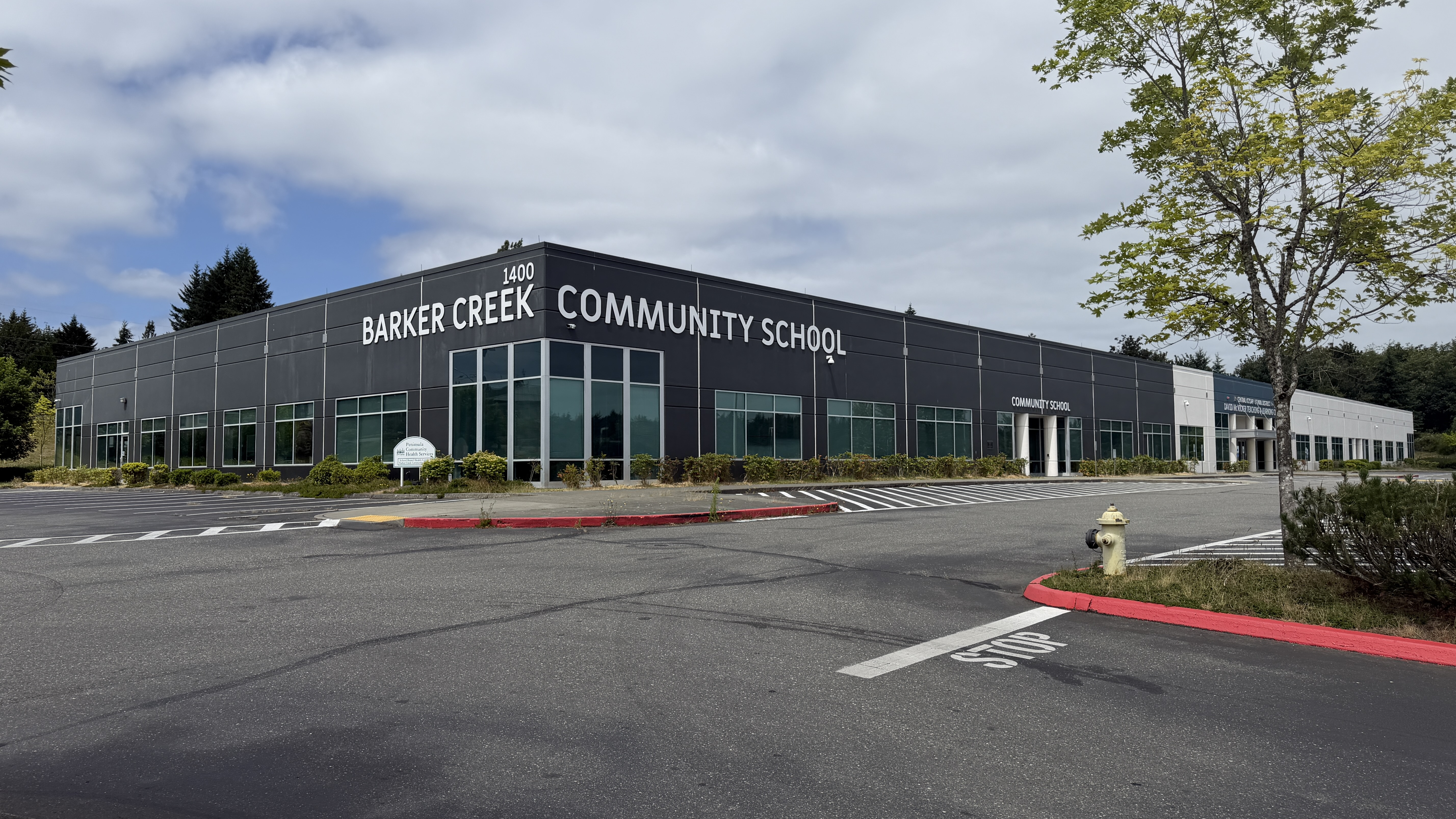

Location
- 1400 NE McWilliams Road; Bremerton, Washington; United States
- 47.6223°N 122.6315°W

Information
- Type: Community school
- Established: 2017
- School district: Central Kitsap School District
- Principal: Stuart Crisman
- Teaching staff: 13.70 (FTE) (2024-25)
- Grades: K-12
- Enrollment: 524 (2025–26)
- Student to teacher ratio: 40.22 (2024-25)
- Colors: Black, Gray, Lime Green
- Mascot: Owl
- Website: barkercreek.ckschools.org

Barker Creek Community School (BCCS) is a public K-12 school of choice in Bremerton, Washington, United States. It is operated by the Central Kitsap School District and was established in 2017 as an alternative learning option. The school offers classroom-based learning, a remote learning program, and a homeschooling support program.

== History ==
The Central Kitsap School District announced in November 2016 that it would phase out its existing alternative learning programs and consolidate them in one facility, a renovated former call center facility. The institution was officially named Barker Creek Community School on December 14, 2016. The Central Kitsap School District initiated the design and remodeling process for the building in late 2016. Construction work began in January 2017, with the goal of opening the school by August 2017. Barker Creek Community School began operations in September 2017 and was designated as a school of choice within the Central Kitsap School District.

== Academics and programs ==
Barker Creek Community School provides three distinct learning models: a homeschooling support program for grades K–8; a virtual academy for all grades; and a classroom-based program for high school-age students.

The Central Kitsap School District provides behavioral health services to all students, including those at Barker Creek.

== Demographics ==
In the 2025-2026 school year, 49% of the students at Barker Creek Community School were male, 50% were female, and 1% were Gender X. 0.4% were Native American, 0.8% were Asian, 1% were Native Hawaiian/Other Pacific Islander, 12% were Hispanic/Latino, 2.7% were Black/African American, 66.2% were White, and 17% were Two or More Races.
