= Toe Nash =

American baseball player (1982–2025)

- Outfielder
- Born: February 16, 1982; Baton Rouge, Louisiana, U.S.
- Died: June 27, 2025 (aged 43); Longview, Texas, U.S.
- Batted: Switch Threw: Right
- Stats at Baseball Reference

Gregory Nash (February 16, 1982 – June 27, 2025), nicknamed "Toe" or "Big Toe", was an American professional baseball player. He played minor league baseball in the Tampa Bay Devil Rays (now Rays) organization in 2001. Standing at 6 feet 5 inches (1.96 m) and weighing 220 pounds (100 kg), Nash received his nickname due to his size 18 (US) shoes.

A high school dropout, Nash was discovered by the Devil Rays while playing in a semi-professional league in Sorrento, Louisiana. His life story seemed so improbable that baseball executives at first thought Nash was a hoax, similar to the Sidd Finch. Despite his natural raw ability, compared to Babe Ruth, and the fictional Roy Hobbs character from The Natural, Nash's legal troubles shortened his professional career.

== Biography ==
Nash was born in Baton Rouge, Louisiana on February 16, 1982 as the oldest of two children and lived most of his life in Sorrento, Louisiana. His mother abandoned him when he was 12 years old, and his father Charles "Tuttie" Payton raised him along with his younger sister Joanna in a trailer home. Payton taught Nash to hit as a child using old socks and bottle caps in lieu of baseballs. He was expelled from two schools once for fighting and once for threatening to stab a teacher, and finally dropped out of school altogether after being suspended for a fight in the eighth grade. In 1994 at the age of 12, Nash played in the Dixie Youth Tournament, a Little League tournament in Hammond, Louisiana. Standing 5 feet 10 inches (1.78 m) and weighing 140 pounds (64 kg), he struck out 17 of 21 batters he faced with a 70-mile-per-hour (110 km/h) fastball, and hit two home runs. Tampa Bay Devil Rays scout Benny Latino, a former college player at Southeastern Louisiana University whose hometown is Hammond and happened to be invited by his friend that day watched the game and was deeply impressed by Nash’s raw talent and made a note to look for Nash in the future, assuming he would be a star in high school. As he did not attend high school, however, Nash fell into obscurity and Latino spent seven years looking for him before eventually finding him and inviting him for a chance to try out.

In lieu of a high school education, Nash went to work in his cousin's sugar cane fields at age 16 along with his father. He played in exhibitions against local high schools and in a semi-professional baseball league, and attended an open tryout for the Pittsburgh Pirates. At the age of 18, Latino found Nash playing in this semi-pro league, known as the Sugar Cane League, featuring amateurs and ex-minor leaguers. In a game in Tangipahoa, the scout witnessed Toe hitting 400-foot (120 m) home runs from both sides of the plate, and throwing 93 miles per hour (150 km/h) from the mound. The Devil Rays brought Nash to their minor league camp in Princeton, West Virginia, for a workout in front of scouting director Dan Jennings. Nash pitched in the high 80s, topping out at 95 miles per hour (153 km/h). He also hit towering home runs, drawing comparisons to Yankee legend Babe Ruth for his power. After Nash went undrafted in the 2000 Major League Baseball draft, the Devil Rays signed him for a $30,000 (equivalent to $56,441.81 in 2025) signing bonus. He was assigned to their fall instructional league, where he played in the outfield alongside Josh Hamilton and Carl Crawford. Nash's agent, Larry Reynolds, introduced Nash to his brother Harold Reynolds, an ESPN analyst and former two time major league All-Star infielder, who invited him to a baseball camp in Los Angeles in February 2001. There, Nash worked out with MLB players, including future Baseball Hall of Fame player Tony Gwynn, Barry Bonds, Eddie Murray, and Alvin Davis. Harold Reynolds also discussed Nash on television. Officials from other organizations felt that the story reminded them of the hoax of Sidd Finch.

Despite legal troubles, including an arrest for felony robbery and a domestic violence incident between Nash and his 41 year old girlfriend but the charges were dropped, Nash still reported to spring training with the Devil Rays in 2001. They assigned him to extended spring training, and then to the Princeton Devil Rays of the Rookie-level Appalachian League in 2001, playing alongside future major leaguer Jonny Gomes. In his first and only season of professional baseball, Nash hit .240 with eight home runs and 29 runs batted in in 47 games played, and was considered a long-term project for the organization due to his lack of formal training.

According to Latino, Nash "couldn't read, couldn't write...Just wasn't ready to function in society...with an education and social skills of a kid about thirteen years old." Returning to Louisiana after the 2001 season, Nash spent nearly nine months in jail in 2002 for aggravated and statutory rape, after allegedly having sex with a 15-year-old girl. After the aggravated rape charges were dropped, Nash agreed to a plea bargain and was given a 10-year suspended sentence. The Devil Rays released Nash in September 2002, the day after he was released from jail.

After being released by the Rays, the Cincinnati Reds signed Nash in the 2002–03 offseason. The club voided his contract for unspecified legal reasons, believed to be a bar fight for which Nash was arrested. Nash was arrested again in 2005 for a parole violation, and was charged for drug possession after failing a drug test, forcing him to serve the full 10 years of his previously suspended jail sentence. Nash was released from prison in November 2013. He was arrested again, however, in 2015 on drug charges and for failing to register as a sex offender.

== Personal life and death ==
Nash's cousin, former NBA player John "Hot Rod" Williams, organized the Williams All Stars, the Sugar Cane League team on which Nash played.

"The Story of Toe Nash" was featured on ESPN's SportsCenter on June 27, 2014. The feature recounted the then 32-year-old Nash being reunited with Benny Latino, and his return to the Sugar Cane League.

Nash suddenly died in Longview, Texas after relocating from Louisiana and living there for an unspecified amount of time with his family on June 27, 2025, at the age of 43 survived by his daughter and girlfriend.
