= Clarence L. Mohr =

Author and professor of American history

Clarence L. Mohr (October 3, 1946 – August 5, 2017) was a professor of American history and an author. He was a lecturer at Yale in 1979 as a fellow of American Council of Learned Societes, before obtaining posts as a professor at Tulane University, and University of South Alabama.

Mohr received a B.A. from Birmingham-Southern College, an M.A. from the University of Georgia, and a Ph.D. from the University of Georgia.

Mohr taught at Tulane University from 1981 until 1998 when he joined the faculty at the University of South Alabama as Professor and Chair of the History Department. He retired from the school in 2016. Mohr died in Mobile, Alabama on August 5, 2017 after a brief illness.

== Books ==
- Contributor to the New Encyclopedia of Southern Culture 17th ed.
- Tulane: The Emergence of a Modern University, 1945-1980. Baton Rouge: Louisiana State University Press. 2001. (co-authored with Joseph E. Gordon)
- On the Threshold of Freedom: Masters and Slaves in Civil War Georgia. Athens: University of Georgia Press. 1986.
- "Before Sherman: Georgia Blacks and the Union War Effort, 1861-1864," Journal of Southern History 45 (August 1979): 331-52.
- Frontier and Plantation in Oglethorpe County, Georgia, 1773-1830. Lexington, GA: Historic Oglethorpe County Inc. 1970.
