= Olympic High School (Bremerton, Washington) =

Location
- 7077 Stampede Boulevard NW, Bremerton, Washington 98311; United States; 47°37′36″N 122°39′54″W

Information
- Type: Public
- Established: 1979
- School district: Central Kitsap School District
- NCES School ID: 530108001753
- Principal: Scott Wilson
- Teaching staff: 51.19 (FTE)
- Enrollment: 1,159 (2023-2024)
- Student to teacher ratio: 22.64
- Colors: Royal blue and silver
- Mascot: Trojan
- Website: olympic.ckschools.org

Olympic High School is a secondary school located in Bremerton, Washington, United States. It is one of six secondary schools in the Central Kitsap School District. OHS educates grades 9–12. Course offerings include several Advanced Placement courses, a college in the High School program in partnership with Central Washington University, and an advanced Career and Technical Education program called Project Lead the Way. The school also offers students programs in vocal and instrumental music, and Sports medicine.

In 2016, voters within the Central Kitsap School District passed a bond for $220 million towards renovations within the district's schools. This allowed the school to begin a major modernization project. During phase one, the center of the building was demolished, with a two-story building constructed in its place. The addition included career and technical classrooms, an updated library, an auditorium and commons areas. On January 28, 2019, the first phase of renovations was completed, and the school hosted a grand re-opening. In January 2020, plans were made to begin the second phase of renovations, but progress was halted multiple times. In March of 2020, the spread of Covid-19 caused the United States to go into a state of lockdown. This affected students, teachers, and workers at Olympic High School, slowing the progress of renovations dramatically. In April of 2021, two more setbacks occurred: A contractor bumped into a faulty pipe, causing a leak and major water damage to the gymnasium, leading to the replacement of the gym floors only partially covered by insurance. The second setback was the discovery of asbestos in the flooring of the school's locker rooms.

The school's main gym is also the home venue for the Kitsap Admirals of the American Basketball Association and International Basketball League.

== Demographics ==
2018-2019 school year

In the 2018-2019 School year, the total number of students enrolled was 1,201. the current racial demographics for the 2018–2019 school year are as follows: 49% White, 23% Mixed, 14% Hispanic, 8% Asian, 5% African American, 2% Hawaiian Native/Pacific Islander, 0.4% American Indian/Alaskan Native. The gender distribution of students is that of 47% Female, 52.6% Male, and 0.4% other. 33% of students qualify for free or reduced lunches.

== Notable alumni ==
- John Coker, professional basketball player
- Malcolm DeWalt IV, NFL cornerback for the Atlanta Falcons and Carolina Panthers
- Scott Forstall, software engineer, best known for leading the original software development team for the iPhone and iPad
- Ben Gibbard, musician, frontman of Death Cab for Cutie
- Corey Lewis, comic book creator
- George Quibuyen, vocalist of Blue Scholars
- Bree Schaaf, Olympic bobsledder
- Christian Welp, professional basketball player
