= Central Kitsap High School =

Location
- 10140 Frontier Pl NW; Silverdale, Washington; United States; 47°39′05″N 122°41′56″W

Information
- Type: Public secondary
- Established: 1924 (as Port Washington Bay Union High School)
- School district: Central Kitsap School District
- Principal: Alex Chertok
- Teaching staff: 70.37 (FTE) (2023-24)
- Grades: 9–12
- Enrollment: 1,578 (2024-25)
- Student to teacher ratio: 22.75 (2023-24)
- Colors: Orange and Black
- Mascot: Cougar
- Website: ckhigh.ckschools.org

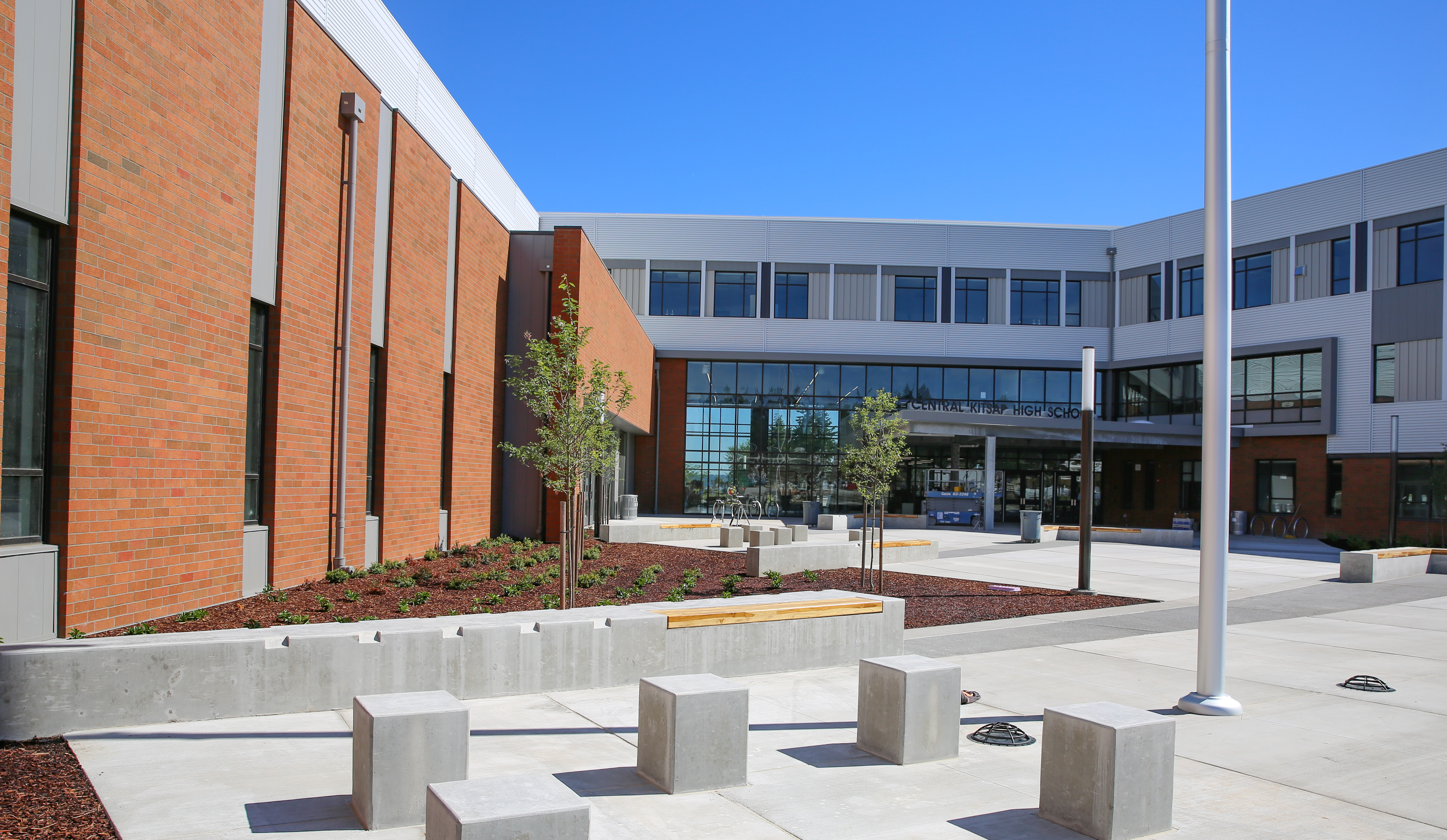
Central Kitsap High School (2019)

Central Kitsap High School is a secondary school located in Silverdale, Washington, United States. It is one of six secondary schools in the Central Kitsap School District. CKHS teaches grades 09–12. CKHS was for the first time ranked in the top 2% of the nation academically in 1984 and has continued to be through the 2015–2016 school year. CKHS has also garnered two Washington Achievement Awards for closing the Achievement Gap, and has also appeared regularly in the U.S. News & World Report as a nationally ranked school (Data complications with the move to adding ninth graders in 2014–2015 have led to an erroneous omission for the 2016 list).

CKHS is a four-year high school, serving grades 9-12 on and off since 1924, as district reconfigurations occur periodically. It was built in 1924 and is the second oldest high school in the state. Beginning in school year 2016–2017, CKHS began competing in the South Sound Conference with seven other 3A schools. In the fall of 2017, the groundbreaking ceremony for the new CKHS and Central Kitsap Middle School building was held. CKHS moved to the new building over the summer of 2019, with classes beginning in the new building in the fall of 2019.

== Demographics ==
In the 2024-2025 school year, 50.8% of the students at Central Kitsap High School were male, 48.8% were female, and 0.4% were Gender X. 0.6% were Native American, 8.0% were Asian, 1.3% were Native Hawaiian/Other Pacific Islander, 15.3% were Hispanic/Latino, 2.9% were Black/African American, 55.4% were White, and 16.6% were Two or More Races.

The student-to-teacher ratio is approximately 21.5:1. In 2012, Central Kitsap High School was named in the top 9% of high schools in America by US News, academically, in math and reading.

== Notable alumni ==
- Kevin Bond Allen, bishop in the Anglican Church in North America (ACNA)
- Michelle Downey Caldier, Washington State House Representative 26th District, Position 2
- Tiffany Cartwright, United States district judge
- Mike Herrera, vocalist and bass guitarist for the band MxPx
- Bryan Hinkle, former Linebacker for the Pittsburgh Steelers
- Troy Kelly, American professional golfer who plays on the PGA Tour
- Todd Linden, former MLB outfielder for the San Francisco Giants
- Steve Okoniewski, former NFL defensive end
- Kendall Runyan, Miss Washington's Teen 2025
- Bill Sheffield, former Governor of Alaska
- Joe Sullivan, former MLB pitcher
