= Sorrento, Louisiana =

- Town
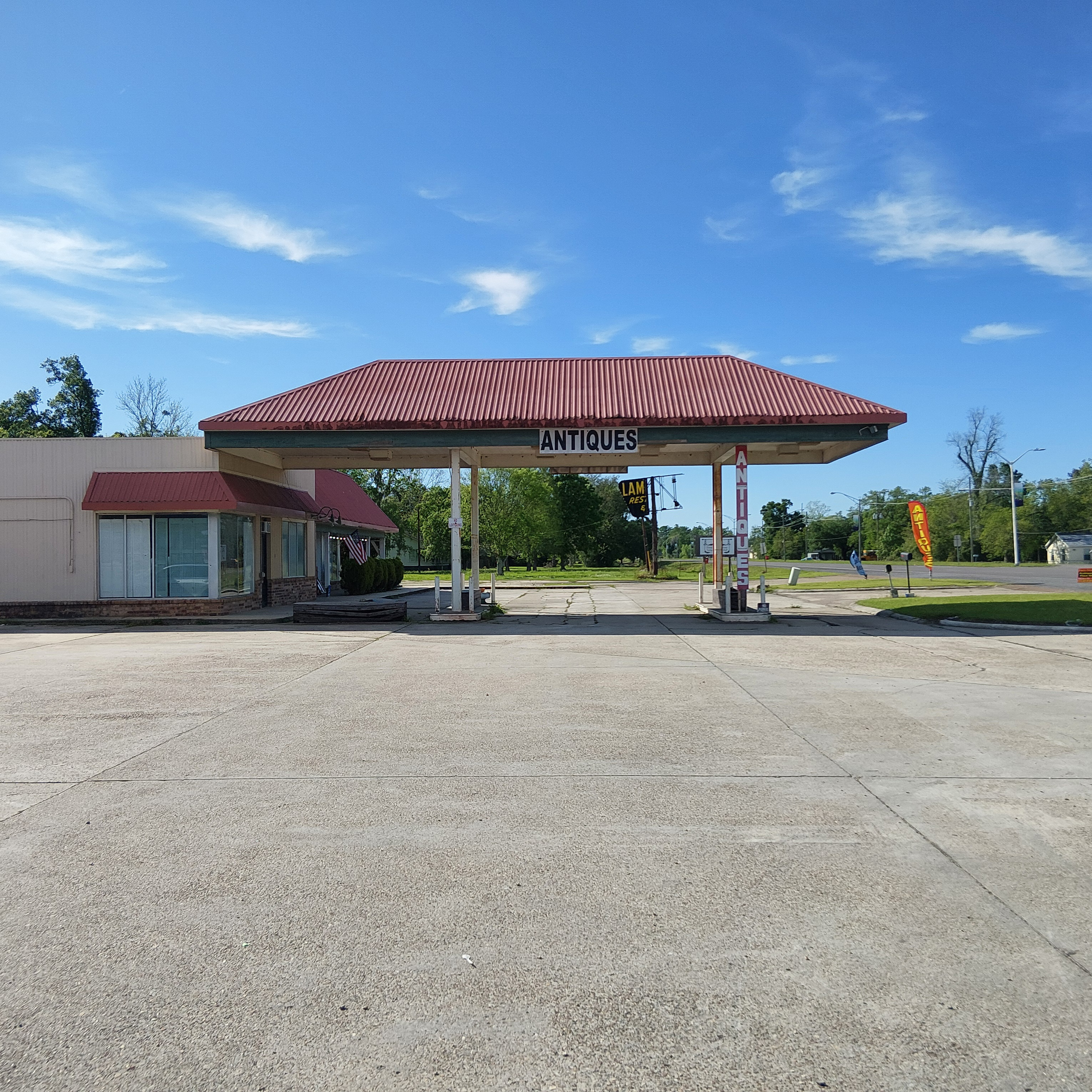
- U.S. Route 61 in Sorrento

- Location of Sorrento in Ascension Parish, Louisiana.

- Location of Louisiana in the United States
- Coordinates: 30°10′49″N 90°51′58″W
- Country: United States
- State: Louisiana
- Parish: Ascension
- Incorporated: September 11, 1956

Government
  - Mayor: Chris Guidry

Area
  - Total: 3.69 sq mi (9.55 km^{2})
  - Land: 3.64 sq mi (9.44 km^{2})
  - Water: 0.042 sq mi (0.11 km^{2})
- Elevation: 7 ft (2.1 m)

Population (2020)
  - Total: 1,514
  - Density: 415.4/sq mi (160.37/km^{2})
- Time zone: UTC-6 (CST)
  - Summer (DST): UTC-5 (CDT)
- ZIP code: 70778
- Area code: 225
- FIPS code: 22-71225
- Website: www.sorrentola.gov

Sorrento is a town in Ascension Parish, Louisiana, United States. The population was 1,514 in 2020. It is part of the Baton Rouge metropolitan statistical area.

== Geography ==
Sorrento is located at 30°10′49″N 90°51′58″W (30.180229, -90.866138). According to the United States Census Bureau, the town has a total area of 3.1 square miles (8.1 km^{2}), all land.

== Demographics ==
Historical population
Census	Pop.	Note	%±
1960	1,151		—
1970	1,182		2.7%
1980	1,197		1.3%
1990	1,119		−6.5%
2000	1,227		9.7%
2010	1,401		14.2%
2020	1,514		8.1%
2025 (est.)	1,622	▲	7.1%
U.S. Decennial Census

Sorrento racial composition as of 2020
Race	Number	Percentage
White (non-Hispanic)	1,085	71.66%
Black or African American (non-Hispanic)	253	16.71%
Native American	7	0.46%
Asian	10	0.66%
Pacific Islander	1	0.07%
Other/Mixed	45	2.97%
Hispanic or Latino	113	7.46%

As of the 2020 United States census, there were 1,514 people, 634 households, and 417 families residing in the town.

== Education and media ==
Sorrento Primary School (K-5)

Sorrento is home to River Parishes Community College, established in 1998.

The official journal for the Town of Sorrento is The Gonzales Weekly Citizen.

== Notable people ==
- Louis Lambert, former state senator, former public service commissioner, and defeated Democratic for governor of Louisiana in 1979, lived in Sorrento at time of his death
- Toe Nash, Minor League Baseball player in the Tampa Bay Rays organization.
- Clay Schexnayder, former member of the Louisiana House of Representatives from Ascension Parish, owns an automotive repair business in Sorrento.
- John "Hot Rod" Williams, NBA player
