= John "Hot Rod" Williams =

American basketball player (1962–2015)

John Williams
Personal information
- Born: August 9, 1962 Sorrento, Louisiana, U.S.
- Died: December 11, 2015 (aged 53) Baton Rouge, Louisiana, U.S.
- Listed height: 6 ft 11 in (2.11 m)
- Listed weight: 245 lb (111 kg)

Career information
- High school: St. Amant (St. Amant, Louisiana)
- College: Tulane (1981–1985)
- NBA draft: 1985: 2nd round, 45th overall pick
- Drafted by: Cleveland Cavaliers
- Playing career: 1985–1999
- Position: Power forward / center
- Number: 18

Career history
- 1985: Rhode Island Gulls
- 1986: Staten Island Stallions
- 1986–1995: Cleveland Cavaliers
- 1995–1998: Phoenix Suns
- 1999: Dallas Mavericks

Career highlights
- NBA All-Rookie First Team (1987); USBL Player of the Year (1985); Metro Conference Player of the Year (1984); 3x First-team All-Metro Conference (1982, 1984, 1985)

Career NBA statistics
- Points: 9,784 (11.0 ppg)
- Rebounds: 5,998 (6.8 rpg)
- Blocks: 1,456 (1.6 bpg)
- Stats at NBA.com
- Stats at Basketball Reference

John "Hot Rod" Williams (August 9, 1962 – December 11, 2015) was an American professional basketball player in the National Basketball Association (NBA) from 1986 to 1999.

== Early life ==
Williams was born in Sorrento, Louisiana, a small town near Baton Rouge. He earned the nickname "Hot Rod" as a baby due to his habit of making engine-like noises as he scooted backwards across the floor.

== College basketball ==
A 6-foot-11-inch (2.11 m) power forward/center, he played collegiately at Tulane University, leaving as that school's all-time second-leading scorer. His career at Tulane was somewhat checkered, however. According to a Tulane booster club president, Williams was nearly kicked off the team in his sophomore year "for missing practices and for being unreliable". Additionally, he was a marginal student at best. He barely maintained a C average in high school, and had barely passed the SAT. At Tulane, his grade point average hovered in the C–D range despite a schedule laden with "decidedly non-academic" courses such as driver's education and weight training.

=== Arrest ===
On March 27, 1985, Williams was arrested for suspicion of point shaving. According to the indictment, Williams had taken at least $8,550 from Gary Kranz for influencing point spreads in games against Southern Miss, Memphis State and Virginia Tech. Williams was charged with sports bribery and conspiracy; his first trial ended with a mistrial, but during his second trial a jury found him not guilty of all five counts. Due in part to the scandal, Tulane shuttered its men's basketball program from 1985 to 1989.

== NBA career ==
Williams was selected by the Cleveland Cavaliers in the 1985 NBA draft with the 21st pick of the second round (45th overall). However, due to the trial, Williams spent the 1985–86 season playing for the United States Basketball League. Able to play for the Cavaliers the next year, Williams was named to the NBA all-rookie team for the 1986–87 season, along with teammates Ron Harper and Brad Daugherty. Perhaps Williams' finest season occurred in 1989, when he averaged 16.8 points, 8.1 rebounds and 2.04 blocked shots per game while mostly serving as the team's sixth man. Following the 1989–90 season, he re-signed with the Cavaliers to a 7-year, $26.5 million contract, making him one of the five highest paid players in the NBA in the early 1990s. At the time, this was an unprecedented salary for a sixth man like Williams. Prior to March 22, 2009, he ranked as the Cavaliers' all-time leader in blocked shots (1,200) (surpassed by Žydrūnas Ilgauskas). Williams spent nine seasons with the Cavaliers before being traded to the Phoenix Suns for Dan Majerle during the 1995 offseason. He finished out his NBA career with the Dallas Mavericks.

== Career statistics ==
Legend
GP	Games played	GS	Games started	MPG	Minutes per game
FG%	Field goal percentage	3P%	3-point field goal percentage	FT%	Free throw percentage
RPG	Rebounds per game	APG	Assists per game	SPG	Steals per game
BPG	Blocks per game	PPG	Points per game	**Bold**	Career high
*	Led the league

=== NBA ===
==== Regular season ====
Year	Team	GP	GS	MPG	FG%	3P%	FT%	RPG	APG	SPG	BPG	PPG
1986–87	Cleveland	80	**80**	33.9	.485	.000	.745	7.9	1.9	.7	2.1	14.6
1987–88	Cleveland	77	50	27.4	.477	.000	**.756**	6.6	1.3	.8	1.9	10.6
1988–89	Cleveland	**82***	10	25.9	**.509**	**.250**	.748	5.8	1.3	.9	1.6	11.6
1989–90	Cleveland	**82***	29	33.9	.493	—	.739	8.1	2.0	1.0	2.0	**16.8**
1990–91	Cleveland	43	14	30.1	.463	.000	.652	6.7	2.3	.8	1.6	11.7
1991–92	Cleveland	80	12	30.4	.503	.000	.752	7.6	2.5	.8	**2.3**	11.9
1992–93	Cleveland	67	13	30.4	.470	—	.716	6.2	2.3	.8	1.6	11.0
1993–94	Cleveland	76	72	35.0	.478	—	.728	7.6	2.5	1.0	1.7	13.7
1994–95	Cleveland	74	73	**35.7**	.452	.200	.685	6.9	**2.6**	**1.1**	1.4	12.6
1995–96	Phoenix	62	58	26.6	.453	.000	.731	6.0	1.0	.7	1.5	7.3
1996–97	Phoenix	68	66	31.4	.490	.000	.672	**8.3**	1.5	1.0	1.3	8.0
1997–98	Phoenix	71	30	18.8	.470	—	.699	4.4	.7	.5	.8	3.6
1998–99	Dallas	25	11	16.1	.333	—	.700	3.3	.6	.5	.7	1.2
Career		887	518	29.7	.480	.105	.726	6.8	1.8	.8	1.6	11.0

==== Playoffs ====
Year	Team	GP	GS	MPG	FG%	3P%	FT%	RPG	APG	SPG	BPG	PPG
1988	Cleveland	5	0	26.6	.500	–	.462	5.8	.8	.6	1.4	9.2
1989	Cleveland	5	2	32.2	.467	–	.722	6.8	2.0	.4	1.4	11.0
1990	Cleveland	5	0	34.8	**.557**	–	.773	**9.2**	2.2	.4	.1	**19.0**
1992	Cleveland	**17**	0	33.4	.545	–	**.798**	7.6	2.5	1.4	1.0	15.0
1993	Cleveland	9	0	26.3	.400	–	.750	4.6	1.9	.6	1.6	9.0
1995	Cleveland	4	4	**36.0**	.286	.000	.375	6.3	**2.8**	**2.3**	.8	6.8
1996	Phoenix	4	4	28.8	.438	–	.667	6.5	.3	.0	**1.8**	9.0
1997	Phoenix	5	**5**	21.0	.533	–	.400	4.6	.6	.4	1.6	4.0
1998	Phoenix	3	0	11.0	.286	–	.667	1.3	.3	.0	.7	2.0
Career		57	15	29.3	.479	.000	.722	6.3	1.8	.8	1.2	10.9

== Personal life and death ==
Williams had five children; John Williams Jr., John Francis Williams, Johnna Williams, John Paul Williams, and Sydney Gibbs. His nephew, Toe Nash, played professional baseball in the Tampa Bay Rays minor-league organization.

Williams was diagnosed with colon cancer in April 2014, and died on December 11, 2015, at Our Lady of the Lake Regional Medical Center in Baton Rouge, Louisiana, at age 53.

== See also ==
- List of National Basketball Association career blocks leaders
- John "Hot Plate" Williams – also played college basketball in Louisiana in the mid-1980s at LSU and later in the NBA
