= John Coker (basketball) =

American basketball player (born 1971)

Personal information
- Born: October 28, 1971 (age 54) Richland, Washington, U.S.
- Listed height: 7 ft 0 in (2.13 m)
- Listed weight: 253 lb (115 kg)

Career information
- High school: Olympic (Bremerton, Washington)
- College: Boise State (1991–1995)
- NBA draft: 1995: undrafted
- Playing career: 1995–2003
- Position: Center
- Number: 40, 51

Career history
- 1995–1996: Phoenix Suns
- 1996: Connecticut Pride
- 1996–1997: KK Sibenik
- 1998: Xacobeo 99 Ourense
- 1999: Washington Wizards
- 2000: Quad City Thunder
- 2000–2001: Golden State Warriors
- 2001: Memphis Houn'Dawgs
- 2001: Sioux Falls Skyforce
- 2001: Viola Reggio Calabria
- 2002: Asheville Altitude
- 2003: Idaho Stampede

Career highlights
- 2× First-team All-Big Sky (1994, 1995)
- Stats at NBA.com
- Stats at Basketball Reference

John Michael Coker (born October 28, 1971) is an American professional basketball player born in Richland, Washington.

Playing at center at 7'0", he has played in the NBA for three teams and also in the Continental Basketball Association with the Idaho Stampede. He has also been under contract with, but never played in any regular season games for the Toronto Raptors (1997), Houston Rockets (1999) and Minnesota Timberwolves (2000).
