= 1989–90 Golden State Warriors season =

NBA professional basketball team season

- Head coach: Don Nelson
- Arena: Oakland-Alameda County Coliseum Arena

Results
- Record: 37–45 (.451)
- Place: Division: 5th (Pacific); Conference: 10th (Western)
- Playoff finish: Did not qualify
- Stats at Basketball Reference

Local media
- Television: KPIX-TV; KICU-TV; Pacific Sports Network
- Radio: KNBR

The 1989–90 Golden State Warriors season was the 44th season for the Golden State Warriors in the National Basketball Association, and their 27th season in the San Francisco Bay Area.

== Season summary ==
=== Off-season ===
The Warriors had the 14th overall pick in the 1989 NBA draft, and selected point guard Tim Hardaway from the University of Texas-El Paso; Hardaway would team up with All-Star forward Chris Mullin, and second-year star Mitch Richmond to form the threesome later on known as Run TMC.

For the season, the Warriors redesigned their home and road uniforms; the team removed their logo of the state of California with a star on the Bay Area in a circle from the front of their jerseys, and added their primary logo on the left leg of their shorts. The new uniforms would remain in use until 1997.

=== Regular season ===
With the addition of Hardaway, the Warriors struggled losing 14 of their first 18 games of the regular season, but then posted two six-game winning streaks afterwards, winning 12 of their next 15 games, and holding a 23–24 record at the All-Star break. At mid-season, the team traded Winston Garland to the Los Angeles Clippers. However, the Warriors fell below .500 in winning percentage by posting a six-game losing streak in February, and later on losing six of their final eight games of the season, finishing in fifth place in the Pacific Division with a 37–45 record, and missing the NBA playoffs.

Mullin averaged 25.1 points, 5.9 rebounds, 4.1 assists and 1.6 steals per game, and was named to the All-NBA Third Team, while Richmond averaged 22.1 points and 1.3 steals per game, and Terry Teagle provided the team with 16.1 points per game. In addition, Hardaway contributed 14.7 points, 8.7 assists and 2.1 steals per game, and was named to the NBA All-Rookie First Team, while rookie shooting guard Sarunas Marciulionis contributed 12.1 points per game off the bench, Rod Higgins provided with 11.1 points and 5.1 rebounds per game, Tom Tolbert averaged 8.8 points and 5.2 rebounds per game, and Manute Bol contributed 1.9 points, 3.7 rebounds and 3.2 blocks per game, but struggled only shooting .331 in field-goal percentage.

During the NBA All-Star weekend at the Miami Arena in Miami, Florida, Mullin was selected for the 1990 NBA All-Star Game, as a member of the Western Conference All-Star team. The Warriors finished 13th in the NBA in home-game attendance, with an attendance of 616,025 at the Oakland-Alameda County Coliseum Arena during the regular season. The team also led the NBA in scoring, averaging 116.3 points per game during the regular season.

=== Notable highlights ===
One notable highlight of the regular season occurred on January 21, 1990, in a road game against the Boston Celtics at the Boston Garden, in which the Warriors defeated the Celtics, 120–115. Mullin, Richmond and Hardaway all surpassed 20 points in the same game together for the first time; Mullin scored 30 points along with 7 assists, while Richmond scored 26 points, and Hardaway posted a double-double of 25 points and 10 assists.

=== Aftermath ===
Following the season, Teagle was traded to the Los Angeles Lakers, and Bol was traded to the Philadelphia 76ers.

== Draft picks ==
Round	Pick	Player	Position	Nationality	College
1	14	Tim Hardaway	PG	United States	Texas-El Paso

== Roster ==
1989–90 Golden State Warriors roster
Players

Pos.	No.	Player	Height	Weight	DOB	From
C	10	Manute Bol	7 ft 7 in (2.31 m)	200 lb (91 kg)	1962–10–16	Bridgeport
G	5	Tim Hardaway	6 ft 0 in (1.83 m)	175 lb (79 kg)	1966–09–01	UTEP
F	22	Rod Higgins	6 ft 7 in (2.01 m)	200 lb (91 kg)	1960–01–31	Fresno State
C	53	Alton Lister (injured)	7 ft 0 in (2.13 m)	240 lb (109 kg)	1958–10–01	Arizona State
G	13	Šarūnas Marčiulionis	6 ft 5 in (1.96 m)	200 lb (91 kg)	1964–06–13	Lithuania
F	17	Chris Mullin	6 ft 6 in (1.98 m)	200 lb (91 kg)	1963–07–30	St. John's
C	43	Jim Petersen	6 ft 10 in (2.08 m)	235 lb (107 kg)	1962–02–22	Minnesota
G	23	Mitch Richmond	6 ft 5 in (1.96 m)	215 lb (98 kg)	1965–06–30	Kansas State
C	52	Mike Smrek	7 ft 0 in (2.13 m)	250 lb (113 kg)	1962–08–31	Canisius
G/F	20	Terry Teagle	6 ft 5 in (1.96 m)	195 lb (88 kg)	1960–04–10	Baylor
F	3	Tom Tolbert	6 ft 7 in (2.01 m)	235 lb (107 kg)	1965–10–16	Arizona
G	7	Kelvin Upshaw	6 ft 2 in (1.88 m)	180 lb (82 kg)	1963–01–24	Utah
C	40	Chris Welp	7 ft 0 in (2.13 m)	245 lb (111 kg)	1964–01–02	Washington

Coaches
Head coach
- Don Nelson
Assistant(s)
- Mike Schuler
- Garry St. Jean
- Donnie Nelson

Legend
- (DP) Unsigned draft pick
- (FA) Free agent
- (S) Suspended
- Injured

Roster
Updated: February 28, 1990

== Regular season ==
=== Season standings ===
Pacific Division	W	L	PCT	GB	Home	Road	Div
y-Los Angeles Lakers	63	19	.768	–	37–4	26–15	22–6
x-Portland Trail Blazers	59	23	.720	4	35–6	24–17	20–8
x-Phoenix Suns	54	28	.659	9	32–9	22–19	20–8
Seattle SuperSonics	41	41	.500	22	30–11	11–30	11–17
Golden State Warriors	37	45	.451	26	27–14	10–31	11–17
Los Angeles Clippers	30	52	.366	33	20–21	10–31	7–21
Sacramento Kings	23	59	.280	40	16–25	7–34	7–21

#	Western Conference				
#	Team	W	L	PCT	GB
1	z-Los Angeles Lakers	63	19	.768	–
2	y-San Antonio Spurs	56	26	.683	7
3	x-Portland Trail Blazers	59	23	.720	4
4	x-Utah Jazz	55	27	.671	8
5	x-Phoenix Suns	54	28	.659	9
6	x-Dallas Mavericks	47	35	.573	16
7	x-Denver Nuggets	43	39	.524	20
8	x-Houston Rockets	41	41	.500	22
9	Seattle SuperSonics	41	41	.500	22
10	Golden State Warriors	37	45	.451	26
11	Los Angeles Clippers	30	52	.366	33
12	Sacramento Kings	23	59	.280	40
13	Minnesota Timberwolves	22	60	.268	41
14	Charlotte Hornets	19	63	.232	44

z - clinched division title
y - clinched division title
x - clinched playoff spot

== Player statistics ==
Legend
GP	Games played	GS	Games started	MPG	Minutes per game
FG%	Field-goal percentage	3P%	3-point field-goal percentage	FT%	Free-throw percentage
RPG	Rebounds per game	APG	Assists per game	SPG	Steals per game
BPG	Blocks per game	PPG	Points per game

=== Regular season ===
Player	GP	GS	MPG	FG%	3P%	FT%	RPG	APG	SPG	BPG	PPG
Terry Teagle	82	49	29.0	.480	.214	.830	4.5	1.9	1.1	.2	16.1
Rod Higgins	82	22	24.3	.481	.347	.821	5.1	1.6	.6	.6	11.1
Tim Hardaway	79	78	33.7	.471	.274	.764	3.9	8.7	2.1	.2	14.7
Chris Mullin	78	78	36.3	.536	.372	.889	5.9	4.1	1.6	.6	25.1
Mitch Richmond	78	78	35.9	.497	.358	.866	4.6	2.9	1.3	.3	22.1
Manute Bol	75	20	17.5	.331	.188	.510	3.7	.5	.2	3.2	1.9
Šarūnas Marčiulionis	75	3	22.6	.519	.256	.787	2.9	1.6	1.3	.1	12.1
Tom Tolbert	70	21	19.2	.493	.278	.726	5.2	.8	.3	.4	8.8
Winston Garland^{†}	51	4	17.5	.375	.100	.841	2.2	3.1	.9	.1	5.3
Jim Petersen	43	19	13.8	.426	.000	.712	3.7	.5	.4	.5	4.0
Uwe Blab^{†}	40	33	12.0	.379		.548	2.5	.6	.0	.6	2.1
Kelvin Upshaw^{†}	23	0	11.0	.490	.222	.774	1.2	1.1	1.1	.0	5.6
Chris Welp^{†}	14	2	10.1	.421		.783	2.6	.3	.4	.6	3.6
John Shasky	14	0	3.6	.286		.333	.9	.1	.1	.1	.7
Mike Smrek	13	3	8.2	.417		.167	2.6	.1	.3	.8	1.6
Marques Johnson	10	0	9.9	.375	.667	.824	1.7	.9	.0	.1	4.0
Leonard Taylor	10	0	3.7	.000	.000	.688	1.2	.1	.0	.0	1.1
Alton Lister	3	0	13.3	.500	.000	.571	2.7	.7	.3	.0	4.0

- ^{†} Denotes player spent time with another team in the season. Stats reflect time with the Warriors only.

Player statistics citation:

== Awards and records ==
- Chris Mullin, NBA All-Star Game
- Chris Mullin, All-NBA Third Team
- Tim Hardaway, NBA All-Rookie Team 1st Team

== Transactions ==
- June 15, 1989: Otis Smith drafted in the NBA expansion draft by the Orlando Magic.
- June 16, 1989: Released Orlando Graham.
- June 16, 1989: Released Ben McDonald.
- June 16, 1989: Released John Starks.
- June 23, 1989: Signed Sarunas Marciulionis as a free agent.
- June 27, 1989: Traded a 1989 1st round draft pick to the Seattle SuperSonics for a 1990 1st round draft pick.
- July 5, 1989: Released Steve Alford.
- July 11, 1989: Larry Smith signed as an unrestricted free agent with the Houston Rockets.
- August 7, 1989: Traded a 1990 1st round draft pick to the Seattle SuperSonics for Alton Lister.
- August 10, 1989: Signed Leonard Taylor as a free agent.
- September 22, 1989: Signed Uwe Blab as an unrestricted free agent.
- September 27, 1989: Traded Ralph Sampson to the Sacramento Kings for Jim Petersen.
- October 2, 1989: Traded Tellis Frank to the Miami Heat for a 1990 2nd round draft pick.
- October 5, 1989: Signed Tom Tolbert as a free agent.
- October 5, 1989: Steve Alford signed as an unrestricted free agent with the Dallas Mavericks.
- October 7, 1989: Signed Marques Johnson as an unrestricted free agent.
- November 2, 1989: Waived Tom Tolbert.
- November 9, 1989: Signed Tom Tolbert as a free agent.
- November 29, 1989: Waived Marques Johnson.
- December 4, 1989: Signed John Shasky as a free agent.
- December 12, 1989: Waived Leonard Taylor.
- February 22, 1990: Traded Uwe Blab to the San Antonio Spurs for Chris Welp.
- February 22, 1990: Traded Winston Garland to the Los Angeles Clippers for a 1990 2nd round draft pick and a 1992 2nd round draft pick.
- February 27, 1990: Signed Mike Smrek to a contract for the rest of the season.
- February 27, 1990: Waived John Shasky.
- February 28, 1990: Signed Kelvin Upshaw to a contract for the rest of the season.

Player Transactions Citation:

== See also ==
- 1989-90 NBA season
