= 1989–90 Charlotte Hornets season =

NBA professional basketball team season

- Head coach: Dick Harter (fired); Gene Littles
- General manager: Carl Scheer (through March 26, 1990); Gene Littles (after March 26, 1990)
- Owner: George Shinn
- Arena: Charlotte Coliseum

Results
- Record: 19–63 (.232)
- Place: Division: 7th (Midwest); Conference: 14th (Western)
- Playoff finish: Did not qualify
- Stats at Basketball Reference

Local media
- Television: WCCB (Ted Robinson, Mike Pratt)
- Radio: WBT (Steve Martin, Gil McGregor)

The 1989–90 Charlotte Hornets season was the second season for the Charlotte Hornets in the National Basketball Association.

== Season summary ==
=== Off-season ===
After finishing with a 20–62 record in their inaugural season, the Hornets received the fifth overall pick in the 1989 NBA draft, and selected power forward J.R. Reid from the University of North Carolina. In December, the team signed free agent Kenny Gattison. The Hornets moved from the Eastern Conference to the Western Conference, also switching from the Atlantic Division to the Midwest Division for the season.

=== Regular season ===
In their second season, and with the addition of J.R. Reid, the Hornets struggled losing 18 of their first 21 games of the regular season, which included a 10-game losing streak between November and December. In December, the team traded Kurt Rambis to the Phoenix Suns in exchange for Armen Gilliam. After an 8–32 start to the season, head coach Dick Harter was fired and replaced with assistant coach Gene Littles as an interim coach. The Hornets held an 8–37 record at the All-Star break, posted a 12-game losing streak between January and February, posted an eight-game losing streak in March, and lost six of their final seven games of the season. The Hornets finished in last place in the Midwest Division with a 19–63 record, which was one game worse than the previous year.

Gilliam averaged 18.8 points and 8.8 rebounds per game in 60 games after the trade, while second-year star Rex Chapman averaged 17.5 points per game, and Dell Curry played an increased as the team's sixth man, averaging 16.0 points and 1.5 steals per game off the bench. In addition, Kelly Tripucka contributed 15.6 points per game, while J.R. Reid provided the team with 11.1 points and 8.4 rebounds per game, and was named to the NBA All-Rookie Second Team, and Muggsy Bogues provided with 9.4 points, 10.7 assists and 2.0 steals per game. Meanwhile, Robert Reid contributed 6.4 points per game, and Gattison averaged 5.9 points and 3.1 rebounds per game.

During the NBA All-Star weekend at the Miami Arena in Miami, Florida, Chapman participated in the NBA Slam Dunk Contest. Despite the lack of success on the court, the Hornets sold out every home game, finishing second in the NBA in home-game attendance behind the expansion Minnesota Timberwolves, with an attendance of 979,941 at the Charlotte Coliseum during the regular season.

=== Aftermath ===
Following the season, Robert Reid and Mike Holton were both released to free agency.

== Draft picks ==
Round	Pick	Player	Position	Nationality	College
1	5	J.R. Reid	PF	United States	North Carolina
2	29	Dyron Nix (traded to Indiana)	SF/PF	United States	Tennessee

== Roster ==
1989–90 Charlotte Hornets roster
Players

Pos.	No.	Player	Height	Weight	DOB	From
F	35	Richard Anderson	6 ft 10 in (2.08 m)	240 lb (109 kg)	1960-11-19	UC Santa Barbara
G	1	Muggsy Bogues	5 ft 3 in (1.60 m)	136 lb (62 kg)	1965-01-09	Wake Forest
G	3	Rex Chapman	6 ft 4 in (1.93 m)	185 lb (84 kg)	1967-10-05	Kentucky
G	30	Dell Curry	6 ft 4 in (1.93 m)	190 lb (86 kg)	1964-06-25	Virginia Tech
F	33	Kenny Gattison	6 ft 8 in (2.03 m)	225 lb (102 kg)	1964-05-23	Old Dominion
F	45	Armen Gilliam	6 ft 9 in (2.06 m)	230 lb (104 kg)	1964-05-28	UNLV
G	6	Mike Holton	6 ft 4 in (1.93 m)	185 lb (84 kg)	1961-08-04	California
C	42	Dave Hoppen (injured)	6 ft 11 in (2.11 m)	235 lb (107 kg)	1964-03-13	Nebraska
F	31	Randolph Keys	6 ft 7 in (2.01 m)	195 lb (88 kg)	1966-04-19	Southern Miss
F	22	Ralph Lewis	6 ft 6 in (1.98 m)	200 lb (91 kg)	1963-03-28	La Salle
C	34	J.R. Reid	6 ft 9 in (2.06 m)	247 lb (112 kg)	1968-03-31	North Carolina
F	50	Robert Reid	6 ft 8 in (2.03 m)	205 lb (93 kg)	1955-08-30	Saint Mary's
F	32	Brian Rowsom	6 ft 9 in (2.06 m)	220 lb (100 kg)	1965-10-23	UNC Wilmington
F	7	Kelly Tripucka	6 ft 6 in (1.98 m)	220 lb (100 kg)	1959-02-16	Notre Dame
G	24	Micheal Williams	6 ft 2 in (1.88 m)	175 lb (79 kg)	1966-07-23	Baylor

Coaches
Head coach
- Dick Harter (fired)
- Gene Littles
Assistant(s)
- Ed Badger
- Mike Pratt

Legend
- (DP) Unsigned draft pick
- (FA) Free agent
- (S) Suspended
- Injured

Roster
Updated: April 14, 1990

== Regular season ==
=== Season standings ===
Midwest Division	W	L	PCT	GB	Home	Road	Div
y-San Antonio Spurs	56	26	.683	–	34–7	22–19	19–9
x-Utah Jazz	55	27	.671	1	36–5	19–22	21–7
x-Dallas Mavericks	47	35	.573	9	30–11	17–24	17–11
x-Denver Nuggets	43	39	.524	13	28–13	15–26	15–13
x-Houston Rockets	41	41	.500	15	31–10	10–31	13–15
Minnesota Timberwolves	22	60	.268	34	17–24	5–36	6–22
Charlotte Hornets	19	63	.232	37	13–28	6–35	7–21

#	Western Conference				
#	Team	W	L	PCT	GB
1	z-Los Angeles Lakers	63	19	.768	–
2	y-San Antonio Spurs	56	26	.683	7
3	x-Portland Trail Blazers	59	23	.720	4
4	x-Utah Jazz	55	27	.671	8
5	x-Phoenix Suns	54	28	.659	9
6	x-Dallas Mavericks	47	35	.573	16
7	x-Denver Nuggets	43	39	.524	20
8	x-Houston Rockets	41	41	.500	22
9	Seattle SuperSonics	41	41	.500	22
10	Golden State Warriors	37	45	.451	26
11	Los Angeles Clippers	30	52	.366	33
12	Sacramento Kings	23	59	.280	40
13	Minnesota Timberwolves	22	60	.268	41
14	Charlotte Hornets	19	63	.232	44

== Game log ==
=== Regular season ===
1989–90 game log
Total: 19–63 (home: 13–28; road: 6–35)
November: 3–11 (home: 3–3; road: 0–8)

Game	Date	Team	Score	High points	High rebounds	High assists	Location Attendance	Record

December: 3–9 (home: 3–6; road: 0–3)

Game	Date	Team	Score	High points	High rebounds	High assists	Location Attendance	Record
17	December 7, 1989	Portland	L 86–96				Charlotte Coliseum	3–14
21	December 16, 1989	@ Chicago	L 104–115				Chicago Stadium	3–18

January: 2–13 (home: 1–5; road: 1–8)

Game	Date	Team	Score	High points	High rebounds	High assists	Location Attendance	Record
32	January 12, 1990	Chicago	L 95–107				Charlotte Coliseum	7–25
33	January 15, 1990	@ Phoenix	L 108–118 (OT)				Arizona Veterans Memorial Coliseum	7–26
37	January 21, 1990	@ Portland	L 100–115				Memorial Coliseum	8–29
39	January 25, 1990	Phoenix	L 97–124				Charlotte Coliseum	8–31

February: 1–11 (home: 1–6; road: 0–5)

Game	Date	Team	Score	High points	High rebounds	High assists	Location Attendance	Record
All-Star Break
50	February 20, 1990	Portland	L 94–104				Charlotte Coliseum	9–41

March: 6–12 (home: 3–4; road: 3–8)

Game	Date	Team	Score	High points	High rebounds	High assists	Location Attendance	Record
59	March 11, 1990	Detroit	L 88–98				Charlotte Coliseum	10–49
62	March 16, 1990	@ Portland	L 109–124				Memorial Coliseum	10–52
65	March 21, 1990	@ Phoenix	W 115–114 (OT)				Arizona Veterans Memorial Coliseum	12–53
69	March 28, 1990	@ Detroit	L 97–106				The Palace of Auburn Hills	14–55
70	March 29, 1990	Phoenix	L 92–105				Charlotte Coliseum	14–56

April: 4–7 (home: 2–4; road: 2–3)

Game	Date	Team	Score	High points	High rebounds	High assists	Location Attendance	Record

1989–90 schedule

== Player statistics ==
=== Ragular season ===
Player	POS	GP	GS	MP	REB	AST	STL	BLK	PTS	MPG	RPG	APG	SPG	BPG	PPG
J. R. Reid	C	82	82	2,757	691	101	92	54	908	33.6	8.4	1.2	1.1	.7	11.1
Muggsy Bogues	PG	81	65	2,743	207	867	166	3	763	33.9	2.6	10.7	2.0	.0	9.4
Kelly Tripucka	SF	79	73	2,404	322	224	75	16	1,232	30.4	4.1	2.8	.9	.2	15.6
Dell Curry	SG	67	13	1,860	168	159	98	26	1,070	27.8	2.5	2.4	1.5	.4	16.0
Kenny Gattison	PF	63	2	941	197	39	35	31	372	14.9	3.1	.6	.6	.5	5.9
Armen Gilliam^{†}	PF	60	59	2,159	529	91	63	46	1,128	36.0	8.8	1.5	1.1	.8	18.8
Robert Reid^{†}	SF	60	27	1,117	143	82	36	14	383	18.6	2.4	1.4	.6	.2	6.4
Rex Chapman	SG	54	52	1,762	179	132	46	6	945	32.6	3.3	2.4	.9	.1	17.5
Richard Anderson	PF	54	2	604	127	55	20	9	231	11.2	2.4	1.0	.4	.2	4.3
Brian Rowsom	PF	44	2	559	131	22	18	11	225	12.7	3.0	.5	.4	.3	5.1
Stuart Gray^{†}	C	39	1	466	131	17	12	24	101	11.9	3.4	.4	.3	.6	2.6
Jerry Sichting^{†}	PG	34	8	469	19	92	16	2	118	13.8	.6	2.7	.5	.1	3.5
Randolph Keys^{†}	SF	32	5	723	116	49	30	6	336	22.6	3.6	1.5	.9	.2	10.5
Micheal Williams^{†}	PG	22	1	303	31	77	22	1	151	13.8	1.4	3.5	1.0	.0	6.9
Kurt Rambis^{†}	PF	16	16	448	120	28	32	10	146	28.0	7.5	1.8	2.0	.6	9.1
Michael Holton	PG	16	0	109	2	16	1	0	29	6.8	.1	1.0	.1	.0	1.8
Dave Hoppen	C	10	2	135	36	6	2	1	40	13.5	3.6	.6	.2	.1	4.0
Terry Dozier	SF	9	0	92	15	3	6	2	22	10.2	1.7	.3	.7	.2	2.4
Andre Turner^{†}	PG	8	0	84	3	20	7	0	22	10.5	.4	2.5	.9	.0	2.8
Ralph Lewis^{†}	SF	3	0	20	6	0	1	0	10	6.7	2.0	.0	.3	.0	3.3

- ^{†} Denotes player spent time with another team in the season. Stats reflect time with the Hornets only.

== Awards and records ==
- J. R. Reid, NBA All-Rookie Team 2nd Team

== Transactions ==
- August 16, 1989

Signed Clifford Lett as a free agent.

- September 11, 1989

Traded Tim Kempton to the Denver Nuggets for a 1991 2nd round draft pick (Kevin Lynch was later selected).

Signed Jerry Sichting as a free agent.

- September 26, 1989

Signed Kenny Gattison as a free agent.

- September 28, 1989

Signed Terry Dozier as a free agent.

- October 5, 1989

Signed Andre Turner as a free agent.

- October 17, 1989

Traded Robert Reid to the Portland Trail Blazers for Richard Anderson.

- October 19, 1989

Waived Kenny Gattison.

- October 23, 1989

Waived Clifford Lett.

- October 31, 1989

Waived Andre Turner.

- November 1, 1989

Andre Turner claimed on waivers by the Los Angeles Clippers.

- November 23, 1989

Signed Andre Turner as a free agent.

- November 25, 1989

Greg Kite signed as an unrestricted free agent with the Sacramento Kings.

- November 27, 1989

Waived Terry Dozier.

- December 2, 1989

Signed Kenny Gattison as a free agent.

- December 3, 1989

Waived Andre Turner.

- December 13, 1989

Traded Kurt Rambis, a 1990 2nd round draft pick (Negele Knight was later selected) and a 1991 2nd round draft pick (Chad Gallagher was later selected) to the Phoenix Suns for Armen Gilliam.

Signed Robert Reid as a free agent.

- February 22, 1990

Traded Stuart Gray to the New York Knicks for a 1991 2nd round draft pick (Jimmy Oliver was later selected).

Traded a 1991 2nd round draft pick (Jimmy Oliver was later selected) to the Cleveland Cavaliers for Randolph Keys.

- February 23, 1990

Waived Jerry Sichting.

- March 13, 1990

Signed Micheal Williams to the first of two 10-day contracts.

- April 2, 1990

Signed Micheal Williams to a contract for the rest of the season.

- April 14, 1990

Signed Ralph Lewis to a 10-day contract.

Player Transactions Citation:
