= 1989–90 Seattle SuperSonics season =

NBA professional basketball team season

- Head coach: Bernie Bickerstaff
- General manager: Bob Whitsitt
- Owner: Barry Ackerley
- Arena: Seattle Center Coliseum

Results
- Record: 41–41 (.500)
- Place: Division: 4th (Pacific); Conference: 9th (Western)
- Playoff finish: Did not qualify
- Stats at Basketball Reference

Local media
- Television: KIRO-TV; KTZZ-TV; Northwest Cable Sports
- Radio: KJR

The 1989–90 Seattle SuperSonics season was the 22nd season for the Seattle SuperSonics in the National Basketball Association. It was the final season for Bernie Bickerstaff as head coach of the SuperSonics.

== Season summary ==
=== Off-season ===
In the 1989 NBA draft, the SuperSonics selected point guard Dana Barros out of Boston College with the 16th overall pick, and also selected power forward Shawn Kemp out of Trinity Valley Community College with the 17th overall pick.

=== Regular season ===
With the addition of Barros and Kemp, the SuperSonics played around .500 in winning percentage with a 7–7 start to the regular season. After an 18–16 start to the season, the team fell below .500 by posting a five-game losing streak in January, as the team later on held a 22–23 record at the All-Star break. The SuperSonics posted a five-game winning streak in February, which led to a 28–25 record as of February 25, 1990. However, the team played below .500 for the remainder of the season, and finished in fourth place in the Pacific Division with a 41–41 record; the SuperSonics lost the eighth seed in the Western Conference to the Houston Rockets, who finished with the same record, but were ahead after tie-breaks as the SuperSonics did not qualify for the NBA playoffs.

Dale Ellis led the SuperSonics in scoring averaging 23.5 points per game, but only played 55 games due to a collapsed lung, and broken ribs suffered from a car accident in January, while Xavier McDaniel averaged 21.3 points and 6.5 rebounds per game, and Derrick McKey provided the team with 15.7 points and 6.1 rebounds per game. In addition, Sedale Threatt contributed 11.4 points per game, while Michael Cage averaged 9.7 points and 10.0 rebounds per game, and Barros contributed 9.7 points per game. Meanwhile, Kemp averaged 6.5 points and 4.3 rebounds per game, Nate McMillan provided with 6.4 points, 7.3 assists and 1.7 steals per game, and Olden Polynice provided with 4.6 points and 3.8 rebounds per game.

During the NBA All-Star weekend at the Miami Arena in Miami, Florida, Kemp participated in the NBA Slam Dunk Contest. The SuperSonics finished 26th in the NBA in home-game attendance, with an attendance of 473,277 at the Seattle Center Coliseum during the regular season, which was the second-lowest in the league.

=== Notable highlights ===
One notable highlight of the regular season occurred on November 9, 1989, in a road game against the Milwaukee Bucks at the Bradley Center; the SuperSonics lost to the Bucks in a quintuple-overtime game, 155–154. Ellis scored 53 points in 69 minutes, while McDaniel posted a double-double of 37 points and 13 rebounds in 68 minutes.

=== Aftermath ===
This was also McDaniel's final full season in Seattle, as he would be traded midway through the following season to the Phoenix Suns.

== Draft picks ==
Seattle drafted future All-Stars Dana Barros and Shawn Kemp as their only two picks of the 1989 Draft. Kemp would go on to have a successful 8-year run with the Sonics.

Round	Pick	Player	Position	Nationality	College
1	16	Dana Barros	PG	United States	Boston College
1	17	Shawn Kemp	PF / C	United States	Trinity Valley CC

== Roster ==
1989–90 Seattle SuperSonics roster
Players

Pos.	No.	Player	Height	Weight	DOB	From
G	11	Dana Barros	5 ft 11 in (1.80 m)	163 lb (74 kg)	1967–04–13	Boston College
C	44	Michael Cage	6 ft 9 in (2.06 m)	224 lb (102 kg)	1962–01–28	San Diego State
G	20	Quintin Dailey	6 ft 3 in (1.91 m)	180 lb (82 kg)	1961–01–22	San Francisco
F	3	Dale Ellis	6 ft 7 in (2.01 m)	205 lb (93 kg)	1960–08–06	Tennessee
G	21	Jim Farmer	6 ft 4 in (1.93 m)	190 lb (86 kg)	1964–09–23	Alabama
G	15	Avery Johnson	5 ft 10 in (1.78 m)	175 lb (79 kg)	1965–03–25	Southern
C	33	Steve Johnson	6 ft 10 in (2.08 m)	235 lb (107 kg)	1957–11–03	Oregon State
F	40	Shawn Kemp	6 ft 10 in (2.08 m)	230 lb (104 kg)	1969–11–26	Trinity Valley CC
F	34	Xavier McDaniel	6 ft 7 in (2.01 m)	205 lb (93 kg)	1963–06–04	Wichita State
F	31	Derrick McKey	6 ft 9 in (2.06 m)	205 lb (93 kg)	1966–10–10	Alabama
G	10	Nate McMillan	6 ft 5 in (1.96 m)	195 lb (88 kg)	1964–08–03	NC State
F	50	Scott Meents	6 ft 10 in (2.08 m)	225 lb (102 kg)	1964–01–04	Illinois
C	23	Olden Polynice	6 ft 11 in (2.11 m)	220 lb (100 kg)	1964–11–21	Virginia
G	4	Sedale Threatt	6 ft 2 in (1.88 m)	175 lb (79 kg)	1961–09–10	West Virginia Tech

Coaches
Head coach
- Bernie Bickerstaff
Assistant(s)
- Bob Kloppenburg
- Tom Newell
- Gary Wortman

Legend
- (DP) Unsigned draft pick
- (FA) Free agent
- (S) Suspended
- Injured

== Regular season ==
=== Season standings ===
Pacific Division	W	L	PCT	GB	Home	Road	Div
y-Los Angeles Lakers	63	19	.768	–	37–4	26–15	22–6
x-Portland Trail Blazers	59	23	.720	4	35–6	24–17	20–8
x-Phoenix Suns	54	28	.659	9	32–9	22–19	20–8
Seattle SuperSonics	41	41	.500	22	30–11	11–30	11–17
Golden State Warriors	37	45	.451	26	27–14	10–31	11–17
Los Angeles Clippers	30	52	.366	33	20–21	10–31	7–21
Sacramento Kings	23	59	.280	40	16–25	7–34	7–21

#	Western Conference				
#	Team	W	L	PCT	GB
1	z-Los Angeles Lakers	63	19	.768	–
2	y-San Antonio Spurs	56	26	.683	7
3	x-Portland Trail Blazers	59	23	.720	4
4	x-Utah Jazz	55	27	.671	8
5	x-Phoenix Suns	54	28	.659	9
6	x-Dallas Mavericks	47	35	.573	16
7	x-Denver Nuggets	43	39	.524	20
8	x-Houston Rockets	41	41	.500	22
9	Seattle SuperSonics	41	41	.500	22
10	Golden State Warriors	37	45	.451	26
11	Los Angeles Clippers	30	52	.366	33
12	Sacramento Kings	23	59	.280	40
13	Minnesota Timberwolves	22	60	.268	41
14	Charlotte Hornets	19	63	.232	44

==== Game log ====
1989–90 game log
November

Game	Date	Team	Score	High points	High rebounds	High assists	Location Attendance	Record
1	November 3, 1989	Minnesota Timberwolves	106–94	Ellis (33)	Cage (11)	Threatt (6)	13,805 (Seattle, Washington)	1–0
2	November 4, 1989	at Sacramento Kings	100–107	Cage (24)	Cage (13)	McMillan and Barros (4)	17,104 (Sacramento, California)	1-1
3	November 7, 1989	Charlotte Hornets	128–88	McDaniel and Ellis (23)	Cage (14)	McMillan (9)	9,521 (Seattle, Washington)	2–1
4	November 9, 1989	at Milwaukee Bucks	154–155 (5OT)	Ellis (53)	McDaniel (13)	McMillan (10)	14,012 (Milwaukee, Wisconsin)	2-2
5	November 11, 1989	at Chicago Bulls	102–109	Ellis (30)	Cage (10)	McMillan (10)	16,676 (Chicago, Illinois)	2–3
6	November 12, 1989	at Minnesota Timberwolves	108–97	McKey (32)	Cage (16)	McMillan (12)	21,702 (Minneapolis, Minnesota)	3-3
7	November 14, 1989	Dallas Mavericks	109–113 (OT)	McDaniel (31)	Cage (10)	McDaniel and McMillan (5)	9,880 (Seattle, Washington)	3–4
8	November 16, 1989	Washington Bullets	111–98	McDaniel (26)	McKey (11)	Barros (6)	9,562 (Seattle, Washington)	4-4
9	November 18, 1989	Chicago Bulls	119–110	McDaniel (36)	Cage (10)	McMillan (10)	14,708 (Seattle, Washington)	5–4
10	November 19, 1989	at Portland Trail Blazers	109–119	Ellis and Cage (17)	Cage (15)	Ellis (6)	12,884 (Portland, Oregon)	5-5
11	November 21, 1989	New Jersey Nets	114–84	McDaniel (26)	Cage (15)	McMillan (11)	12,109 (Seattle, Washington)	6–5
12	November 24, 1989	at Denver Nuggets	109–122	Barros (18)	Cage and Kemp (8)	Johnson (10)	13,061 (Denver, Colorado)	6-6
13	November 25, 1989	at Dallas Mavericks	117–70	McDaniel (22)	Cage (14)	McMillan (8)	17,007 (Dallas, Texas)	7–6
14	November 28, 1989	at San Antonio Spurs	104–117	Ellis (37)	McMillan (11)	McMillan (14)	12,115 (San Antonio, Texas)	7-7
15	November 30, 1989	New York Knicks	127–122	McDaniel (37)	McKey and McMillan (8)	McMillan (13)	13,583 (Seattle, Washington)	8–7

December

Game	Date	Team	Score	High points	High rebounds	High assists	Location Attendance	Record
16	December 2, 1989	Detroit Pistons	120–95	Ellis (30)	McDaniel (10)	McMillan (14)	14,546 (Seattle, Washington)	9–7
17	December 5, 1989	Houston Rockets	133–123	McDaniel (36)	McDaniel (10)	McMillan (11)	9,241 (Seattle, Washington)	10–7
18	December 9, 1989	Los Angeles Clippers	104–100	Ellis (28)	Cage (15)	McMillan (6)	12,548 (Seattle, Washington)	11–7
19	December 13, 1989	at Boston Celtics	97–109	Ellis (32)	Ellis and Cage (9)	McMillan (7)	14,890 (Boston, Massachusetts)	11–8
20	December 15, 1989	at Cleveland Cavaliers	101–120	McKey (20)	Cage (13)	Johnson (5)	15,072 (Richfield, Ohio)	11–9
21	December 16, 1989	at New York Knicks	97–118	Cage (19)	Cage (10)	Johnson (5)	18,212 (New York City, New York)	11–10
22	December 19, 1989	at Detroit Pistons	77–94	Threatt (18)	Cage (9)	McMillan (7)	21,454 (Auburn Hills, Michigan)	11-11
23	December 21, 1989	Portland Trail Blazers	123–102	Ellis (23)	Cage (13)	McMillan (14)	13,190 (Seattle, Washington)	12–11
24	December 23, 1989	Indiana Pacers	95–98	McDaniel (29)	Cage (12)	McMillan (11)	14,377 (Seattle, Washington)	12-12
25	December 27, 1989	Philadelphia 76ers	110–106	Ellis (33)	Cage (13)	Threatt (7)	14,381 (Seattle, Washington)	13–12
26	December 29, 1989	Boston Celtics	89–96	McDaniel (26)	Cage (14)	McMillan (7)	14,708 (Seattle, Washington)	13-13

January

Game	Date	Team	Score	High points	High rebounds	High assists	Location Attendance	Record
27	January 3, 1990	Utah Jazz	108–119	McDaniel (25)	Cage (19)	Johnson (8)	12,314 (Seattle, Washington)	13–14
28	January 5, 1990	Miami Heat	140–110	Ellis (26)	Kemp (9)	Johnson (17)	9,819 (Seattle, Washington)	14-14
29	January 6, 1990	Phoenix Suns	120–110	McDaniel (29)	Cage (10)	Johnson (11)	14,430 (Seattle, Washington)	15–14
30	January 8, 1990	at Dallas Mavericks	96–110	McDaniel (19)	McDaniel and Polynice (8)	Johnson (9)	16,561 (Dallas, Texas)	15-15
31	January 9, 1990	at Houston Rockets	90–97	Ellis (22)	McMillan (9)	McMillan (8)	15,251 (Houston, Texas)	15–16
32	January 11, 1990	Dallas Mavericks	98–87	Ellis (29)	Cage and McMillan (8)	McMillan (10)	9,397 (Seattle, Washington)	16-16
33	January 13, 1990	Atlanta Hawks	113–106	McDaniel (33)	McDaniel (14)	Johnson (11)	14,330 (Seattle, Washington)	17–16
34	January 15, 1990	Houston Rockets	105–101	McDaniel (25)	Cage (11)	Johnson (7)	11,404 (Seattle, Washington)	18–16
35	January 17, 1990	at Los Angeles Lakers	90–100	Threatt (26)	McDaniel (7)	McMillan (9)	17,505 (Inglewood, California)	18–17
36	January 18, 1990	at Los Angeles Clippers	95–105	McDaniel (30)	McDaniel and McKey (8)	Threatt (6)	11.150 (Los Angeles, California)	18-18
37	January 20, 1990	at Phoenix Suns	98–117	Threatt (21)	Cage (8)	McMillan (6)	14,487 (Phoenix, Arizona)	18–19
38	January 24, 1990	Milwaukee Bucks	112–119	McDaniel (32)	McMillan (9)	McDaniel (8)	10,903 (Seattle, Washington)	18–20
39	January 26, 1990	at Golden State Warriors	102–114	Threatt (36)	McDaniel (15)	McDaniel (7)	15,025 (Oakland, California)	18–21
40	January 27, 1990	San Antonio Spurs	109–98	McDaniel (34)	Cage (9)	McMillan (8)	14,519 (Seattle, Washington)	19–21
41	January 31, 1990	at Minnesota Timberwolves	82–110	McKey (16)	McKey (9)	McMillan (8)	24,153 (Minneapolis, Minnesota)	19–22

February

Game	Date	Team	Score	High points	High rebounds	High assists	Location Attendance	Record
42	February 2, 1990	at Indiana Pacers	87–86	McDaniel (25)	Cage (12)	McMillan and Barros (4)	12,858 (Indianapolis, Indiana)	20–22
43	February 3, 1990	at Washington Bullets	94–92	McDaniel (29)	McDaniel and Cage (8)	McMillan (8)	12,066 (Landover, Maryland)	21–22
44	February 5, 1990	at Charlotte Hornets	101–100	McDaniel (22)	Cage (10)	McMillan, McDaniel, Sellers (4)	23,901 (Charlotte, North Carolina)	22-22
45	February 7, 1990	Phoenix Suns	124–128	McKey (26)	Polynice (8)	McMillan (8)	11,420 (Seattle, Washington)	22–23
46	February 13, 1990	Portland Trail Blazers	106–110	McDaniel (35)	McKey and Cage (10)	McMillan (15)	12,717 (Seattle, Washington)	22–24
47	February 15, 1990	at New Jersey Nets	103–92	McKey (31)	McKey (14)	McMillan (9)	9,304 (East Rutherford, New Jersey)	23–24
48	February 16, 1990	at Philadelphia 76ers	96–100 (OT)	McDaniel (25)	McKey (13)	McMillan (12)	16,190 (Philadelphia, Pennsylvania)	23–25
49	February 18, 1990	at Charlotte Hornets	85–70	McDaniel (20)	Cage (11)	McMillan (4)	23,901 (Charlotte, North Carolina)	24–25
50	February 20, 1990	at Orlando Magic	117–102	McDaniel (27)	McDaniel and Cage (10)	McMillan (17)	15,077 (Orlando, Florida)	25-25
51	February 21, 1990	at Miami Heat	92–85	Barros (18)	Cage (12)	McMillan (7)	15,008 (Miami, Florida)	26–25
52	February 23, 1990	Sacramento Kings	97–85	McKey (24)	Cage (20)	McMillan (9)	13,023 (Seattle, Washington)	27–25
53	February 25, 1990	Golden State Warriors	110–102	McKey (33)	Cage (13)	McMillan (8)	11,775 (Seattle, Washington)	28–25
54	February 27, 1990	at Los Angeles Clippers	99–103	Barros (28)	McKey (10)	McKey and McMillan (5)	10,826 (Los Angeles, California)	28–26
55	February 28, 1990	Los Angeles Lakers	107–112	Barros (20)	McKey (11)	McMillan (7)	14,542 (Seattle, Washington)	28–27

March

Game	Date	Team	Score	High points	High rebounds	High assists	Location Attendance	Record
56	March 2, 1990	Minnesota Timberwolves	99–83	McKey (18)	McKey (9)	McMillan (10)	11,272 (Seattle, Washington)	29–27
57	March 3, 1990	at Portland Trail Blazers	98–110	McKey (22)	McMillan and Cage (10)	McMillan (7)	12,884 (Portland, Oregon)	29–28
58	March 6, 1990	Cleveland Cavaliers	95–90	Barros (23)	Cage (13)	McKey, McMillan, Barros (4)	12,019 (Seattle, Washington)	30–28
59	March 8, 1990	at Houston Rockets	97–111	Cage (20)	Cage (14)	Barros (6)	16,611 (Houston, Texas)	30–29
60	March 9, 1990	at Atlanta Hawks	97–107	Barros (26)	Cage (10)	Barros (10)	14,625 (Atlanta, Georgia)	30-30
61	March 12, 1990	Orlando Magic	130–105	Ellis (24)	McMillan and Kemp (9)	McMillan (11)	10,178 (Seattle, Washington)	31–30
62	March 14, 1990	Charlotte Hornets	103–100	Farmer (26)	Cage (14)	McMillan (13)	8,115 (Seattle, Washington)	32–30
63	March 15, 1990	at Utah Jazz	95–117	Polynice (18)	Kemp (8)	McKey (4)	12,616 (Salt Lake City, Utah)	32–31
64	March 18, 1990	at Golden State Warriors	121–116	Ellis (30)	McKey (11)	McMillan (7)	15,025 (Oakland, California)	33–31
65	March 20, 1990	San Antonio Spurs	106–128	Kemp (20)	Cage (9)	McMillan and Barros (6)	14,541 (Seattle, Washington)	33–32
66	March 22, 1990	Denver Nuggets	125–118	McDaniel (24)	Cage (15)	McMillan (16)	9,830 (Seattle, Washington)	34–32
67	March 24, 1990	at Phoenix Suns	95–121	Kemp (16)	McKey (9)	McMillan (4)	14,487 (Phoenix, Arizona)	34–33
68	March 25, 1990	at Los Angeles Lakers	94–116	Kemp (19)	Cage (9)	McMillan (6)	17,505 (Inglewood, California)	34-34
69	March 27, 1990	at San Antonio Spurs	103–115	Ellis (36)	Cage (7)	McMillan (14)	14,345 (San Antonio, Texas)	34–35
70	March 30, 1990	Golden State Warriors	139–108	McDaniel (34)	Cage (12)	Threatt (13)	13,542 (Seattle, Washington)	35-35

April

Game	Date	Team	Score	High points	High rebounds	High assists	Location Attendance	Record
71	April 1, 1990	at Los Angeles Clippers	103–104	Ellis (39)	Cage (21)	McMillan (8)	11,815 (Los Angeles, California)	35–36
72	April 3, 1990	Portland Trail Blazers	136–134 (OT)	Ellis (30)	Kemp (8)	McMillan (4)	11,414 (Seattle, Washington)	36-36
73	April 5, 1990	Utah Jazz	101–91	Threatt (19)	McDaniel (12)	Barros (5)	12,573 (Seattle, Washington)	37–36
74	April 6, 1990	at Denver Nuggets	103–119	Threatt (22)	Cage (11)	McMillan (8)	16,212 (Denver, Colorado)	37-37
75	April 9, 1990	Sacramento Kings	105–106	Ellis (33)	Cage (12)	McMillan (12)	11,678 (Seattle, Washington)	37–38
76	April 10, 1990	at Utah Jazz	102–114	Ellis (30)	McKey (6)	Ellis (6)	12,616 (Salt Lake City, Utah)	37–39
77	April 12, 1990	Denver Nuggets	113–103	McDaniel (26)	Cage (14)	McKey (7)	10,617 (Seattle, Washington)	38–39
78	April 14, 1990	Phoenix Suns	96–89	Ellis (30)	Cage (13)	Threatt (11)	12,903 (Seattle, Washington)	39-39
79	April 17, 1990	Los Angeles Lakers	101–102	Ellis (28)	Cage (12)	McMillan (10)	14,489 (Seattle, Washington)	39–40
80	April 19, 1990	at Sacramento Kings	130–118 (OT)	Ellis (43)	Cage (11)	Threatt (12)	17,014 (Sacramento, California)	40-40
81	April 20, 1990	Los Angeles Clippers	121–99	Ellis (36)	Cage (12)	McMillan (10)	12,090 (Seattle, Washington)	41–40
82	April 22, 1990	at Golden State Warriors	122-124	Ellis (33)	McDaniel (14)	McDaniel and Threatt (6)	15,025 (Oakland, California)	41-41

1989–90 schedule

== Player statistics ==
=== Legend ===
- GP: Games played
- GS: Games started
- MPG: Minutes per game
- FG%: Field goal percentage
- 3FG%: 3-point field goal percentage
- FT%: Free throw percentage
- RPG: Rebounds per game
- APG: Assists per game
- SPG: Steals per game
- BPG: Blocks per game
- PPG: Points per game

=== Season ===
Player	GP	GS	MPG	FG%	3P%	FT%	RPG	APG	SPG	BPG	PPG
Dana Barros	81	25	20.1	40.5%	39.9%	80.9%	1.6	2.5	0.7	0.0	9.7
Michael Cage	82	82	31.6	50.4%	–	69.8%	10.0	0.9	1.0	0.5	9.7
Quintin Dailey	30	2	16.4	40.4%	20%	78.8%	1.7	1.1	0.4	0.0	8.2
Dale Ellis	55	49	37.0	49.7%	37.5%	81.8%	4.3	2.0	1.1	0.1	23.5
Jim Farmer	38	0	10.5	43.8%	29.6%	71.3%	1.1	0.7	0.4	0.0	6.4
Avery Johnson	53	10	10.8	38.7%	25%	72.5%	0.8	3.1	0.5	0.0	2.6
Steve Johnson ^{1}	21	0	11.5	53.3%	–	60%	2.4	0.8	0.1	0.2	5.6
Shawn Kemp	81	1	13.8	47.9%	16.7%	73.6%	4.3	0.3	0.6	0.9	6.5
Xavier McDaniel	69	67	35.2	49.6%	29.4%	73.3%	6.5	2.5	1.1	0.5	21.3
Derrick McKey	80	80	34.4	49.3%	13%	78.2%	6.1	2.3	1.1	1.0	15.7
Nate McMillan	82	69	28.5	47.3%	35.5%	64.1%	4.9	7.3	1.7	0.5	6.4
Scott Meents	26	0	5.7	43.2%	–	73.9%	1.2	0.3	0.2	0.1	2.1
Olden Polynice	79	7	13.7	54%	50%	47.5%	3.8	0.2	0.3	0.3	4.6
Brad Sellers ^{1}	45	0	13.0	42.4%	0%	80.3%	1.6	0.7	0.2	0.4	4.8
Sedale Threatt	65	18	22.8	50.6%	25%	82.8%	1.8	3.3	1.0	0.1	11.4

1. Statistics with the SuperSonics.

Player statistics citation:

== Awards, records, and honors ==
The Sonics did not have any awards, records, and honors.

== Transactions ==
=== Overview ===
Players Added

Via draft

- Dana Barros
- Shawn Kemp

Via free agency

- Scott Meents
- Jim Farmer
- Quintin Dailey

Via trade

- Brad Sellers
- Steve Johnson
Players Lost

Via draft
(1989 NBA expansion draft)

- Jerry Reynolds

Via free agency

- John Lucas

Via trade

- Alton Lister
- Brad Sellers

=== Trades ===
June 26, 1989	To Seattle SuperSonics Brad Sellers	To Chicago Bulls Conditional 1989 first round pick
June 27, 1989	To Seattle SuperSonics Conditional 1989 first round pick	To Golden State Warriors Conditional 1990 first round pick
June 27, 1989	To Seattle SuperSonics Conditional 1993 second round pick	To Chicago Bulls Seattle's agreement not to draft B. J. Armstrong with the 16th or 17th draft pick.
August 7, 1989	To Seattle SuperSonics Conditional 1990 first round pick	To Golden State Warriors Alton Lister
February 22, 1990	To Seattle SuperSonics Steve Johnson	To Minnesota Timberwolves Brad Sellers

=== Free agents ===
==== Additions ====
Player	Signed	Former team
Scott Meents	September 27, 1989	
Jim Farmer	February 12, 1990	
Quintin Dailey	February 22, 1990	

==== Subtractions ====
Player	Left	New team
John Lucas	August 17, 1989	Houston Rockets

Player Transactions Citation:

== See also ==
- 1989–90 NBA season
