= 1989–90 Utah Jazz season =

NBA professional basketball team season

- Head coach: Jerry Sloan
- General manager: Tim Howells
- Owner: Larry H. Miller
- Arena: Salt Palace

Results
- Record: 55–27 (.671)
- Place: Division: 2nd (Midwest); Conference: 4th (Western)
- Playoff finish: First round (lost to Suns 2–3)
- Stats at Basketball Reference

Local media
- Television: KSTU; Prime Sports Intermountain West
- Radio: KALL

The 1989–90 Utah Jazz season was the 16th season for the Utah Jazz in the National Basketball Association, and their 11th season in Salt Lake City, Utah.

== Season summary ==
=== Off-season ===
The Jazz had the 21st overall pick in the 1989 NBA draft, and selected shooting guard Blue Edwards out of East Carolina University.

=== Regular season ===
With the addition of Edwards, the Jazz got off to a fast start by winning seven of their first eight games of the regular season. The team continued to play solid basketball winning 11 of their 14 games in January, which included a nine-game winning streak, and holding a 33–14 record at the All-Star break. The Jazz posted a seven-game winning streak between February and March, and finished in second place in the Midwest Division with a 55–27 record, earning the fourth seed in the Western Conference; the team qualified for the NBA playoffs for the seventh consecutive year.

Karl Malone averaged 31.0 points, 11.1 rebounds and 1.5 steals per game, and was named to the All-NBA First Team, while John Stockton averaged 17.2 points, 14.5 assists and 2.7 steals per game, and was named to the All-NBA Second Team, and Thurl Bailey provided the team with 14.2 points and 5.0 rebounds per game. In addition, Edwards and Darrell Griffith both contributed 8.9 points per game each, with Edwards being named to the NBA All-Rookie Second Team, while Bob Hansen provided with 7.6 points per game, Mike Brown averaged 6.2 points and 4.5 rebounds per game, and Mark Eaton provided with 4.8 points, 7.3 rebounds and led the team with 2.5 blocks per game.

During the NBA All-Star weekend at the Miami Arena in Miami, Florida, Malone and Stockton were both selected for the 1990 NBA All-Star Game, as members of the Western Conference All-Star team. However, Malone had threatened to boycott the NBA All-Star Game, after A.C. Green of the Los Angeles Lakers was voted by the fans as the starting power forward for the Western Conference instead of Malone, who was selected as a reverse. Malone did not play in the All-Star Game due to an ankle injury, despite playing all 82 games this season; Rolando Blackman of the Dallas Mavericks was selected as his replacement. Meanwhile, Hansen participated in the NBA Three-Point Shootout. Malone finished in fourth place in Most Valuable Player voting, while Stockton finished in ninth place, and Eaton finished tied in fifth place in Defensive Player of the Year voting.

The Jazz finished 22nd in the NBA in home-game attendance, with an attendance of 517,256 at the Salt Palace during the regular season.

=== NBA playoffs ===
In the Western Conference First Round of the 1990 NBA playoffs, the Jazz faced off against the 5th–seeded Phoenix Suns, who were led by the quartet of All-Star forward Tom Chambers, All-Star guard Kevin Johnson, Jeff Hornacek, and sixth man Eddie Johnson. The Jazz won Game 1 over the Suns at home, 113–96 at the Salt Palace, but then lost the next two games as the Suns took a 2–1 series lead. The Jazz managed to win Game 4 over the Suns on the road, 105–94 at the Arizona Veterans Memorial Coliseum to even the series. However, the Jazz lost Game 5 to the Suns at the Salt Palace, 104–102, thus losing in a hard-fought five-game series.

=== Notable highlights ===
One notable highlight of the regular season occurred on January 27, 1990, in which Malone scored a career-high of 61 points against the Milwaukee Bucks at the Salt Palace; the Jazz defeated the Bucks by a score of 144–96.

=== Aftermath ===
Following the season, Hansen was traded to the Sacramento Kings in an off-season three team trade.

== Draft picks ==
Round	Pick	Player	Position	Nationality	College
1	21	Blue Edwards	SG/SF	United States	East Carolina
2	48	Junie Lewis		United States	South Alabama

== Roster ==
1989–90 Utah Jazz roster
Players

Pos.	No.	Player	Height	Weight	DOB	From
F	41	Thurl Bailey	6 ft 11 in (2.11 m)	215 lb (98 kg)	1961–04–07	NC State
C	40	Mike Brown	6 ft 9 in (2.06 m)	257 lb (117 kg)	1963–07–19	George Washington
F	24	Raymond Brown	6 ft 8 in (2.03 m)	220 lb (100 kg)	1965–07–05	Idaho
C	53	Mark Eaton	7 ft 4 in (2.24 m)	275 lb (125 kg)	1957–01–24	UCLA
G/F	30	Blue Edwards	6 ft 4 in (1.93 m)	200 lb (91 kg)	1965–10–31	East Carolina
G	35	Darrell Griffith	6 ft 4 in (1.93 m)	190 lb (86 kg)	1958–06–16	Louisville
G	20	Bob Hansen	6 ft 6 in (1.98 m)	190 lb (86 kg)	1961–01–18	Iowa
G	15	Eric Johnson	6 ft 2 in (1.88 m)	205 lb (93 kg)	1966–02–07	Nebraska
C	45	Eric Leckner	6 ft 11 in (2.11 m)	265 lb (120 kg)	1966–05–27	Wyoming
F	32	Karl Malone	6 ft 9 in (2.06 m)	250 lb (113 kg)	1963–07–24	Louisiana Tech
G	11	Delaney Rudd	6 ft 2 in (1.88 m)	180 lb (82 kg)	1962–11–08	Wake Forest
G	12	John Stockton	6 ft 1 in (1.85 m)	170 lb (77 kg)	1962–03–26	Gonzaga

Coaches
Head coach
- Jerry Sloan
Assistant(s)
- Gordon Chiesa
- David Fredman
- Phil Johnson
- Scott Layden

Legend
- (DP) Unsigned draft pick
- (FA) Free agent
- (S) Suspended
- Injured

Roster
Updated: February 16, 1990

== Regular season ==
=== Season standings ===
Midwest Division	W	L	PCT	GB	Home	Road	Div
y-San Antonio Spurs	56	26	.683	–	34–7	22–19	19–9
x-Utah Jazz	55	27	.671	1	36–5	19–22	21–7
x-Dallas Mavericks	47	35	.573	9	30–11	17–24	17–11
x-Denver Nuggets	43	39	.524	13	28–13	15–26	15–13
x-Houston Rockets	41	41	.500	15	31–10	10–31	13–15
Minnesota Timberwolves	22	60	.268	34	17–24	5–36	6–22
Charlotte Hornets	19	63	.232	37	13–28	6–35	7–21

#	Western Conference				
#	Team	W	L	PCT	GB
1	z-Los Angeles Lakers	63	19	.768	–
2	y-San Antonio Spurs	56	26	.683	7
3	x-Portland Trail Blazers	59	23	.720	4
4	x-Utah Jazz	55	27	.671	8
5	x-Phoenix Suns	54	28	.659	9
6	x-Dallas Mavericks	47	35	.573	16
7	x-Denver Nuggets	43	39	.524	20
8	x-Houston Rockets	41	41	.500	22
9	Seattle SuperSonics	41	41	.500	22
10	Golden State Warriors	37	45	.451	26
11	Los Angeles Clippers	30	52	.366	33
12	Sacramento Kings	23	59	.280	40
13	Minnesota Timberwolves	22	60	.268	41
14	Charlotte Hornets	19	63	.232	44

== Game log ==
=== Regular season ===
1989–90 game log
Total: 55–27 (home: 36–5; road: 19–22)
November: 8–4 (home: 7–2; road: 1–2)

Game	Date	Team	Score	High points	High rebounds	High assists	Location Attendance	Record
1	November 3	Denver	W 122–113				Salt Palace	1–0
2	November 8	Charlotte	W 102–86				Salt Palace	2–0
3	November 10	San Antonio	W 106–92				Salt Palace	3–0
4	November 11	@ Houston	L 92–100				The Summit	3–1
5	November 13	Washington	W 106–93				Salt Palace	4–1
6	November 15	Chicago	W 108–107				Salt Palace	5–1
7	November 17	Indiana	W 114–100				Salt Palace	6–1
8	November 21	@ Minnesota	W 103–101 (OT)				Hubert H. Humphrey Metrodome	7–1
9	November 22	Orlando	L 97–119				Salt Palace	7–2
10	November 25	L.A. Lakers	L 86–92				Salt Palace	7–3
11	November 27	New Jersey	W 105–68				Salt Palace	8–3
12	November 29	@ Indiana	L 88–100				Market Square Arena	8–4

December: 11–5 (home: 7–1; road: 4–4)

Game	Date	Team	Score	High points	High rebounds	High assists	Location Attendance	Record
13	December 1	@ Atlanta	L 103–114				The Omni	8–5
14	December 2	@ Washington	W 100–98				Capital Centre	9–5
15	December 5	@ Cleveland	W 94–80				Richfield Coliseum	10–5
16	December 7	Dallas	W 107–97				Salt Palace	11–5
17	December 9	Houston	W 104–90				Salt Palace	12–5
18	December 11	Cleveland	L 110–113 (OT)				Salt Palace	12–6
19	December 13	Phoenix	W 102–95				Salt Palace	13–6
20	December 15	Detroit	W 94–91				Salt Palace	14–6
21	December 17	@ Minnesota	W 122–112				Hubert H. Humphrey Metrodome	15–6
22	December 19	@ New York	L 107–115				Madison Square Garden	15–7
23	December 20	@ Boston	L 109–113				Boston Garden	15–8
24	December 22	@ Charlotte	W 114–100				Charlotte Coliseum	16–8
25	December 23	@ San Antonio	L 98–115				HemisFair Arena	16–9
26	December 26	Golden State	W 133–118				Salt Palace	17–9
27	December 28	Portland	W 113–109				Salt Palace	18–9
28	December 30	Miami	W 117–98				Salt Palace	19–9

January: 11–3 (home: 7–0; road: 4–3)

Game	Date	Team	Score	High points	High rebounds	High assists	Location Attendance	Record
29	January 2	@ Golden State	L 120–133				Oakland–Alameda County Coliseum Arena	19–10
30	January 3	@ Seattle	W 119–108				Seattle Center Coliseum	20–10
31	January 5	@ Portland	L 89–118				Memorial Coliseum	20–11
32	January 6	@ Denver	W 123–120				McNichols Sports Arena	21–11
33	January 10	Denver	W 130–99				Salt Palace	22–11
34	January 13	@ Dallas	W 109–99				Reunion Arena	23–11
35	January 17	Atlanta	W 95–88				Salt Palace	24–11
36	January 19	Charlotte	W 116–93				Salt Palace	25–11
37	January 20	@ Sacramento	W 94–81				ARCO Arena	26–11
38	January 23	Houston	W 102–94				Salt Palace	27–11
39	January 25	New York	W 115–89				Salt Palace	28–11
40	January 27	Milwaukee	W 144–96				Salt Palace	29–11
41	January 30	@ Portland	L 98–122				Memorial Coliseum	29–12
42	January 31	L.A. Clippers	W 120–101				Salt Palace	30–12

February: 9–4 (home: 5–0; road: 4–4)

Game	Date	Team	Score	High points	High rebounds	High assists	Location Attendance	Record
43	February 2	Dallas	W 105–92				Salt Palace	31–12
44	February 4	@ Detroit	L 83–115				The Palace of Auburn Hills	31–13
45	February 5	@ Philadelphia	L 89–114				The Spectrum	31–14
46	February 7	@ New Jersey	W 108–101				Brendan Byrne Arena	32–14
47	February 8	@ Charlotte	W 94–74				Charlotte Coliseum	33–14
48	February 13	Minnesota	W 110–104 (OT)				Salt Palace	34–14
49	February 14	@ Phoenix	L 103–114				Arizona Veterans Memorial Coliseum	34–15
50	February 16	@ San Antonio	L 86–100				HemisFair Arena	34–16
51	February 17	Sacramento	W 110–106				Salt Palace	35–16
52	February 19	Philadelphia	W 115–102				Salt Palace	36–16
53	February 21	Boston	W 116–103				Salt Palace	37–16
54	February 22	@ L.A. Clippers	W 116–102				Los Angeles Memorial Sports Arena	38–16
55	February 25	@ L.A. Lakers	W 104–103				Great Western Forum	39–16

March: 11–4 (home: 6–1; road: 5–3)

Game	Date	Team	Score	High points	High rebounds	High assists	Location Attendance	Record
56	March 1	Portland	W 119–102				Salt Palace	40–16
57	March 3	San Antonio	W 112–98				Salt Palace	41–16
58	March 5	@ Miami	L 104–105				Miami Arena	41–17
59	March 6	@ Orlando	W 111–101				Orlando Arena	42–17
60	March 8	@ Chicago	W 98–94				Chicago Stadium	43–17
61	March 9	@ Milwaukee	W 108–100				Bradley Center	44–17
62	March 11	@ Denver	W 110–109				McNichols Sports Arena	45–17
63	March 13	Phoenix	L 106–114				Salt Palace	45–18
64	March 15	Seattle	W 117–95				Salt Palace	46–18
65	March 17	@ Sacramento	L 109–122 (OT)				ARCO Arena	46–19
66	March 19	Sacramento	W 105–97				Salt Palace	47–19
67	March 21	L.A. Clippers	W 118–102				Salt Palace	48–19
68	March 23	Golden State	W 106–91				Salt Palace	49–19
69	March 24	@ L.A. Clippers	W 112–79				Los Angeles Memorial Sports Arena	50–19
70	March 29	@ Golden State	L 123–128				Oakland–Alameda County Coliseum Arena	50–20

April: 5–7 (home: 4–1; road: 1–6)

Game	Date	Team	Score	High points	High rebounds	High assists	Location Attendance	Record
71	April 1	@ L.A. Lakers	L 103–119				Great Western Forum	50–21
72	April 3	Charlotte	W 127–104				Salt Palace	51–21
73	April 5	@ Seattle	L 91–101				Seattle Center Coliseum	51–22
74	April 9	@ Phoenix	L 115–119 (OT)				Arizona Veterans Memorial Coliseum	51–23
75	April 10	Seattle	W 114–102				Salt Palace	52–23
76	April 12	L.A. Lakers	W 107–104				Salt Palace	53–23
77	April 14	Houston	L 99–103				Salt Palace	53–24
78	April 15	@ Minnesota	W 103–90				Hubert H. Humphrey Metrodome	54–24
79	April 17	@ Dallas	L 96–97				Reunion Arena	54–25
80	April 18	@ San Antonio	L 93–102				HemisFair Arena	54–26
81	April 20	Minnesota	W 97–89				Salt Palace	55–26
82	April 22	@ Houston	L 88–100				The Summit	55–27

1989–90 schedule

=== Playoffs ===
1990 playoff game log
Western Conference First Round: 2–3 (home: 1–2; road: 1–1)

Game	Date	Team	Score	High points	High rebounds	High assists	Location Attendance	Series
1	April 27	Phoenix	W 113–96	Karl Malone (21)	Karl Malone (11)	John Stockton (17)	Salt Palace; 12,616	1–0
2	April 29	Phoenix	L 87–105	Karl Malone (20)	Karl Malone (10)	John Stockton (8)	Salt Palace; 12,616	1–1
3	May 2	@ Phoenix	L 105–120	Thurl Bailey (30)	Karl Malone (11)	John Stockton (19)	Arizona Veterans Memorial Coliseum; 14,487	1–2
4	May 4	@ Phoenix	W 105–94	Karl Malone (33)	Karl Malone (11)	John Stockton (14)	Arizona Veterans Memorial Coliseum; 14,487	2–2
5	May 6	Phoenix	L 102–104	Bailey, Malone (26)	Mark Eaton (9)	John Stockton (17)	Salt Palace; 12,616	2–3

1990 schedule

== Player statistics ==
Legend
GP	Games played	GS	Games started	MPG	Minutes per game
FG%	Field-goal percentage	3P%	3-point field-goal percentage	FT%	Free-throw percentage
RPG	Rebounds per game	APG	Assists per game	SPG	Steals per game
BPG	Blocks per game	PPG	Points per game

=== Season ===
Player	GP	GS	MPG	FG%	3FG%	FT%	RPG	APG	SPG	BPG	PPG
Thurl Bailey	82	33	31.5	.481	.000	.779	5.0	1.7	.4	1.2	14.2
Mike Brown	82	0	17.0	.515	.500	.789	4.5	.6	.4	.3	6.2
Raymond Brown	16	0	3.5	.286		.000	.9	.3	.0	.0	1.0
Mark Eaton	82	82	27.8	.527		.669	7.3	.5	.4	2.5	4.8
Blue Edwards	82	49	23.0	.507	.300	.719	3.1	1.8	.9	.4	8.9
Darrell Griffith	82	1	17.6	.464	.372	.654	2.0	.8	.8	.2	8.9
Bob Hansen	81	81	26.8	.467	.351	.516	2.8	1.8	.6	.1	7.6
Eric Johnson	48	2	5.7	.238	.167	.765	.6	1.3	.4	.0	1.1
Nate Johnston^{†}	6	0	2.2	.364	1.000	1.000	.3	.0	.0	.2	1.8
Eric Leckner	77	0	9.9	.563		.743	2.5	.2	.2	.3	4.3
Jim Les^{†}	1	0	6.0			.500	.0	1.0	.0	.0	2.0
Karl Malone	82	82	38.1	.562	.372	.762	11.1	2.8	1.5	.6	31.0
José Ortiz	13	0	4.9	.452	.500	.600	1.2	.5	.2	.1	3.2
Delaney Rudd	77	2	11.0	.429	.286	.660	.7	2.3	.3	.0	3.5
John Stockton	78	78	37.4	.514	.416	.819	2.6	14.5	2.7	.2	17.2

=== Playoffs ===
Player	GP	GS	MPG	FG%	3FG%	FT%	RPG	APG	SPG	BPG	PPG
Thurl Bailey	5	5	38.0	.489		.792	6.4	1.4	1.0	1.2	21.0
Mike Brown	5	0	13.4	.467		.800	2.0	.6	.2	.2	3.6
Raymond Brown	3	0	2.0				.0	.0	.0	.0	.0
Mark Eaton	5	5	25.6	.529		.200	6.0	.0	.6	2.8	3.8
Blue Edwards	5	0	18.8	.538	.333	.875	3.6	1.6	1.4	.4	7.2
Darrell Griffith	5	0	19.4	.452	.556	.800	4.2	.6	1.2	.2	9.4
Bob Hansen	5	5	29.0	.488	.500	.250	2.8	1.0	.6	.0	10.0
Eric Johnson	1	0	3.0				.0	.0	.0	.0	.0
Eric Leckner	3	0	9.3	.600	1.000	.556	2.7	.7	.0	.0	6.0
Karl Malone	5	5	40.6	.438	.000	.756	10.2	2.2	2.2	1.0	25.2
Delaney Rudd	5	0	9.0	.348	.143	.500	.6	2.6	.2	.0	3.6
John Stockton	5	5	38.8	.420	.077	.800	3.2	15.0	1.2	.0	15.0

Player statistics citation:

== Awards and records ==
- Karl Malone, All-NBA First Team
- John Stockton, All-NBA Second Team
- Blue Edwards, NBA All-Rookie Team 2nd Team

== Transactions ==
=== Free agents ===
Subtractions
Player	Date signed	New team
Jim Farmer	Expansion Draft June 15, 1989	Orlando Magic
