= 1990–91 Dallas Mavericks season =

NBA professional basketball team season

- Head coach: Richie Adubato
- General manager: Norm Sonju
- Owner: Don Carter
- Arena: Reunion Arena

Results
- Record: 28–54 (.341)
- Place: Division: 6th (Midwest); Conference: 12th (Western)
- Playoff finish: Did not qualify
- Stats at Basketball Reference

Local media
- Television: KTVT; Home Sports Entertainment
- Radio: WBAP

The 1990–91 Dallas Mavericks season was the 11th season for the Dallas Mavericks in the National Basketball Association.

== Season summary ==
=== Off-season ===
During the off-season, the Mavericks signed free agent All-Star forward Alex English, acquired his teammate, All-Star guard Fat Lever from the Denver Nuggets, and acquired Rodney McCray from the Sacramento Kings.

=== Regular season ===
With the addition of English, Lever and McCray, the Mavericks won four of their first five games of the regular season. However, early into the season, the team lost both Lever, and Roy Tarpley to season-ending knee injuries, as Lever only played just four games, while Tarpley only appeared in just five games. While on the injured reserve list, Tarpley was again suspended by the NBA for substance abuse. Without Lever and Tarpley, the Mavericks struggled losing ten of their next twelve games, and later on held a 17–27 record at the All-Star break. The team posted an eight-game losing streak in April, and finished in sixth place in the Midwest Division with a disappointing 28–54 record.

Tarpley averaged 20.4 points, 11.0 rebounds and 1.8 blocks per game during his short five-game stint, while Rolando Blackman averaged 19.9 points per game, and Derek Harper provided the team with 19.7 points, 7.1 assists and 1.9 steals per game. In addition, Herb Williams contributed 12.5 points, 6.0 rebounds and 1.5 blocks per game, while McCray provided with 11.4 points and 7.6 rebounds per game, and James Donaldson averaged 10.0 points and 8.9 rebounds per game. Meanwhile, English contributed 9.7 points per game, second-year forward Randy White averaged 8.8 points and 6.4 rebounds per game, Lever provided with 7.3 points, 3.0 assists and 1.5 steals per game during his short four-game stint, and Brad Davis contributed 5.4 points and 2.9 assists per game.

Harper finished tied in seventh place in Defensive Player of the Year voting, and also finished tied in eighth place in Most Improved Player voting. The Mavericks finished sixth in the NBA in home-game attendance, with an attendance of 683,927 at the Reunion Arena during the regular season.

=== Aftermath ===
Following the season, English retired.

== Draft picks ==
| Round | Pick | Player | Position | Nationality | College |
|---|---|---|---|---|---|
| 2 | 49 | Phil Henderson | SG | United States | Duke |

== Roster ==
1990–91 Dallas Mavericks roster
Players

| Pos. | No. | Player | Height | Weight | DOB | From |
|---|---|---|---|---|---|---|
| G | 4 | Steve Alford | 6 ft 2 in (1.88 m) | 183 lb (83 kg) | 1964–11–23 | Indiana |
| G | 22 | Rolando Blackman | 6 ft 6 in (1.98 m) | 190 lb (86 kg) | 1959–02–26 | Kansas State |
| G | 15 | Brad Davis | 6 ft 3 in (1.91 m) | 180 lb (82 kg) | 1955–12–17 | Maryland |
| C | 40 | James Donaldson | 7 ft 2 in (2.18 m) | 275 lb (125 kg) | 1957–08–16 | Washington State |
| F | 2 | Alex English | 6 ft 7 in (2.01 m) | 190 lb (86 kg) | 1954–01–05 | South Carolina |
| F | 50 | Jim Grandholm | 7 ft 0 in (2.13 m) | 235 lb (107 kg) | 1960–10–04 | South Florida |
| G | 12 | Derek Harper | 6 ft 4 in (1.93 m) | 185 lb (84 kg) | 1961–10–13 | Illinois |
| G | 21 | Fat Lever (injured) | 6 ft 3 in (1.91 m) | 170 lb (77 kg) | 1960–08–18 | Arizona State |
| F | 1 | Rodney McCray | 6 ft 7 in (2.01 m) | 220 lb (100 kg) | 1961–08–29 | Louisville |
| C | 55 | John Shasky | 6 ft 11 in (2.11 m) | 235 lb (107 kg) | 1964–07–31 | Minnesota |
| C | 42 | Roy Tarpley (injured) (S) | 6 ft 11 in (2.11 m) | 230 lb (104 kg) | 1964–11–28 | Michigan |
| G | 5 | Kelvin Upshaw | 6 ft 2 in (1.88 m) | 180 lb (82 kg) | 1963–01–24 | Utah |
| F | 33 | Randy White | 6 ft 8 in (2.03 m) | 240 lb (109 kg) | 1967–11–04 | Louisiana Tech |
| C | 32 | Herb Williams | 6 ft 10 in (2.08 m) | 242 lb (110 kg) | 1958–02–16 | Ohio State |
| F | 34 | Howard Wright | 6 ft 8 in (2.03 m) | 220 lb (100 kg) | 1967–12–20 | Stanford |

Coaches
Head coach
- Richie Adubato
Assistant(s)
- Gar Heard
- Clifford Ray
- Bob Zuffelato

Legend
- (DP) Unsigned draft pick
- (FA) Free agent
- (S) Suspended
- (L) On leave from the team
- Injured

Roster
Updated: January 5, 1991

== Regular season ==
=== Season standings ===
| Midwest Division | W | L | PCT | GB | Home | Road | Div |
|---|---|---|---|---|---|---|---|
| y-San Antonio Spurs | 55 | 27 | .671 | — | 33–8 | 22–19 | 20–8 |
| x-Utah Jazz | 54 | 28 | .659 | 1 | 36–5 | 18–23 | 21-7 |
| x-Houston Rockets | 52 | 30 | .634 | 3 | 31-10 | 21–20 | 20-8 |
| Orlando Magic | 31 | 51 | .378 | 24 | 24-17 | 7–34 | 13–15 |
| Minnesota Timberwolves | 29 | 53 | .354 | 26 | 21-20 | 8-33 | 9-19 |
| Dallas Mavericks | 28 | 54 | .341 | 27 | 20-21 | 8–33 | 7-21 |
| Denver Nuggets | 20 | 62 | .244 | 35 | 17-24 | 3-38 | 8–20 |

y - clinched division title
x - clinched playoff spot

| # | Western Conference | | | | |
| # | Team | W | L | PCT | GB |
|---|---|---|---|---|---|
| 1 | z-Portland Trail Blazers | 63 | 19 | .768 | – |
| 2 | y-San Antonio Spurs | 55 | 27 | .671 | 8 |
| 3 | x-Los Angeles Lakers | 58 | 24 | .707 | 5 |
| 4 | x-Phoenix Suns | 55 | 27 | .671 | 8 |
| 5 | x-Utah Jazz | 54 | 28 | .659 | 9 |
| 6 | x-Houston Rockets | 52 | 30 | .634 | 11 |
| 7 | x-Golden State Warriors | 44 | 38 | .537 | 19 |
| 8 | x-Seattle SuperSonics | 41 | 41 | .500 | 22 |
| 9 | Orlando Magic | 31 | 51 | .378 | 32 |
| 10 | Los Angeles Clippers | 31 | 51 | .378 | 32 |
| 11 | Minnesota Timberwolves | 29 | 53 | .354 | 34 |
| 12 | Dallas Mavericks | 28 | 54 | .341 | 35 |
| 13 | Sacramento Kings | 25 | 57 | .305 | 38 |
| 14 | Denver Nuggets | 20 | 62 | .244 | 43 |

z - clinched division title
y - clinched division title
x - clinched playoff spot

=== Game log ===
1990–91 game log
Total: 28–54 (Home: 0–0; Road: 0–0)
November: 0–0 (home: 0–0; road: 0–0)

| Game | Date | Team | Score | High points | High rebounds | High assists | Location Attendance | Record |

December: 0–0 (home: 0–0; road: 0–0)

| Game | Date | Team | Score | High points | High rebounds | High assists | Location Attendance | Record |

January: 0–0 (home: 0–0; road: 0–0)

| Game | Date | Team | Score | High points | High rebounds | High assists | Location Attendance | Record |

February: 0–0 (home: 0–0; road: 0–0)

| Game | Date | Team | Score | High points | High rebounds | High assists | Location Attendance | Record |

March: 0–0 (home: 0–0; road: 0–0)

| Game | Date | Team | Score | High points | High rebounds | High assists | Location Attendance | Record |

April: 0–0 (home: 0–0; road: 0–0)

| Game | Date | Team | Score | High points | High rebounds | High assists | Location Attendance | Record |

1990–91 schedule

== Player statistics ==
=== Ragular season ===
| Player | POS | GP | GS | MP | REB | AST | STL | BLK | PTS | MPG | RPG | APG | SPG | BPG | PPG |
|---|---|---|---|---|---|---|---|---|---|---|---|---|---|---|---|
| James Donaldson | C | 82 | 82 | 2,800 | 727 | 69 | 34 | 93 | 819 | 34.1 | 8.9 | .8 | .4 | 1.1 | 10.0 |
| Rolando Blackman | SG | 80 | 80 | 2,965 | 256 | 301 | 69 | 19 | 1,590 | 37.1 | 3.2 | 3.8 | .9 | .2 | 19.9 |
| Brad Davis | PG | 80 | 6 | 1,426 | 118 | 230 | 45 | 17 | 431 | 17.8 | 1.5 | 2.9 | .6 | .2 | 5.4 |
| Randy White | PF | 79 | 29 | 1,901 | 504 | 63 | 81 | 44 | 695 | 24.1 | 6.4 | .8 | 1.0 | .6 | 8.8 |
| Alex English | SF | 79 | 26 | 1,748 | 254 | 105 | 40 | 25 | 763 | 22.1 | 3.2 | 1.3 | .5 | .3 | 9.7 |
| Derek Harper | PG | 77 | 77 | 2,879 | 233 | 548 | 147 | 14 | 1,519 | 37.4 | 3.0 | 7.1 | 1.9 | .2 | 19.7 |
| Rodney McCray | PF | 74 | 68 | 2,561 | 560 | 259 | 70 | 51 | 844 | 34.6 | 7.6 | 3.5 | .9 | .7 | 11.4 |
| Herb Williams | C | 60 | 36 | 1,832 | 357 | 95 | 30 | 88 | 747 | 30.5 | 6.0 | 1.6 | .5 | 1.5 | 12.5 |
| John Shasky | C | 57 | 0 | 510 | 134 | 11 | 14 | 20 | 150 | 8.9 | 2.4 | .2 | .2 | .4 | 2.6 |
| Kelvin Upshaw | SG | 48 | 1 | 514 | 55 | 86 | 28 | 5 | 270 | 10.7 | 1.1 | 1.8 | .6 | .1 | 5.6 |
| Steve Alford | PG | 34 | 0 | 236 | 24 | 22 | 8 | 1 | 151 | 6.9 | .7 | .6 | .2 | .0 | 4.4 |
| Jim Grandholm | PF | 26 | 0 | 168 | 50 | 8 | 2 | 8 | 79 | 6.5 | 1.9 | .3 | .1 | .3 | 3.0 |
| Roy Tarpley | C | 5 | 5 | 171 | 55 | 12 | 6 | 9 | 102 | 34.2 | 11.0 | 2.4 | 1.2 | 1.8 | 20.4 |
| Fat Lever | SG | 4 | 0 | 86 | 15 | 12 | 6 | 3 | 29 | 21.5 | 3.8 | 3.0 | 1.5 | .8 | 7.3 |
| Howard Wright^{†} | PF | 3 | 0 | 8 | 2 | 0 | 1 | 0 | 6 | 2.7 | .7 | .0 | .3 | .0 | 2.0 |

- ^{†} Denotes player spent time with another team in the season. Stats reflect time with the Mavericks only.

== Transactions ==
=== Trades ===
June 21, 1990
June 26, 1990
To Dallas Mavericks----
- Fat Lever
To Dallas Mavericks----
- Rodney McCray
- 1990 2nd round draft pick
- 1991 2nd round draft pick
To Denver Nuggets----
- 1990 1st round draft pick
- 1991 1st round draft pick
To Sacramento Kings----
- Bill Wennington
- 1990 1st round draft pick
- 1990 1st round draft pick

== See also ==
- 1990-91 NBA season
