= Kelvin Upshaw =

American basketball player and coach (born 1963)

Personal information
- Born: January 12, 1963 (age 63) Chicago, Illinois, U.S.
- Listed height: 6 ft 2 in (1.88 m)
- Listed weight: 180 lb (82 kg)

Career information
- High school: John Marshall (Chicago, Illinois)
- College: Northeastern Oklahoma A&M (1982–1983); Utah (1983–1986)
- NBA draft: 1986: undrafted
- Playing career: 1986–1999
- Position: Shooting guard
- Number: 10, 7, 5
- Coaching career: 1999–2013

Career history

Playing
- 1986–1987: Jacksonville/Mississippi Jets
- 1987: West Palm Beach Stingrays
- 1987–1988: Mississippi Jets
- 1988: Rapid City Thrillers
- 1988: Palm Beach Stingrays
- 1988–1989: Albany Patroons
- 1989: Miami Heat
- 1989: Albany Patroons
- 1989: Boston Celtics
- 1990: Dallas Mavericks
- 1990: Golden State Warriors
- 1990–1991: Dallas Mavericks
- 1991: Swift Mighty Meaties
- 1991–1992: Bakersfield Jammers
- 1992: Shell Rimula X
- 1992: Winnipeg Thunder
- 1992–1993: Fort Wayne Fury
- 1993–1994: Columbus Horizon
- 1994–1995: Gimnasia y Esgrima de Comodoro Rivadavia
- 1996–1997: Quad City Thunder
- 1997–1999: Komfort Stargard Szczec

Coaching
- 1999–2000: Quad City Thunder (assistant)
- 2000–2001: La Crosse Bobcats (assistant)
- 2001–2002: Sioux Falls Skyforce
- 2002–2004: North Charleston Lowgators (assistant)
- 2004–2005: Dallas Mavericks (assistant)
- 2005–2006: Gary Steelheads (assistant)
- 2006: Harlem Globetrotters (assistant)
- 2012–2013: Charlotte Christian School (asst. girls')

Career highlights
- All-CBA Second Team (1989); CBA All-Defensive Second Team (1987)
- Stats at NBA.com
- Stats at Basketball Reference

Kelvin Parnell Upshaw (born January 24, 1963) is an American former professional basketball player. He is a 6-foot-2-inch (1.88 m) 180 pounds (82 kg) guard and played competitively at Chicago's Marshall High School, Northeastern Oklahoma A&M College and the University of Utah. He played 120 games in the National Basketball Association (NBA) from 1988 to 1991 averaging 5.4 ppg, 2.1 apg and 1.2 rpg in 12.6 mpg.

Upshaw played with the Miami Heat, the Boston Celtics, the Golden State Warriors and with the Dallas Mavericks. He also played professionally in Stargard Szczeciński, Poland (Komfort Stargard Szczec), Italy (Scavolini Pesaro), Argentina, Philippines, and in the CBA with the Quad City Thunder, Albany Patroons, Rapid City and Jacksonville Jets. He was selected in the second round of the 1986 CBA Draft by the Jets.

Upshaw spent the 1986–1987 season with the Jacksonville (later Mississippi) Jets and was selected to the CBA All-Defensive Second Team. Upshaw signed with the West Palm Beach Stingrays of the USBL in the spring of 1987. The Jets cut Upshaw on May 26, 1987, due to injury but recalled Upshaw in late June. Upshaw returned to the Mississippi Jets later in 1987 and was selected to the 1988 CBA All-Star Game. Upshaw later played for the CBA's Rapid City Thrillers for the rest of the season.

Upshaw signed with the Palm Beach Stingrays in June 1988. Upshaw then played for the CBA's Albany Patroons for most of the 1988–1989 season and was selected to the All-CBA Second Team. In January 1989, Upshaw signed with the NBA's Miami Heat. In two ten-day contracts with the Heat, Upshaw played in nine games and averaged 6.8 points, 1.5 rebounds, 3.7 assists. Upshaw re-joined the Patroons on February 7. The NBA's Boston Celtics signed Upshaw in March 1989 to relieve the injured Ramón Rivas. Upshaw played in 23 games for the Celtics averaging 6.3 points, 1.4 rebounds, and 2.2 assists. The Boston Globe noted at the time, "Upshaw has brought to Boston instant up-tempo offense along with tough, chest-to-chest defense against some of the league's best (Isiah Thomas, Mo Cheeks), as well as a certain sang froid in delivering the big jumper."

A week after being waived, Upshaw re-signed with the Celtics on November 24, 1989, and was waived again on December 26, 1989. In 14 games at the beginning of the 1989–90 season with Boston, Upshaw averaged 7.0 points, 1.6 rebounds, and 4.2 assists.

Upshaw signed the first of two ten-day contracts with the Dallas Mavericks on January 6, 1990, and played three games with the Mavericks with very few minutes per game. On February 28, 1990, Upshaw signed a season-long contract with the Golden State Warriors and averaged 5.6 points in 23 games.

Upshaw signed with the Dallas Mavericks on November 12, 1990, and re-signed on December 29 five days after being waived. In 48 games, Upshaw had one start and averaged 5.6 points.

In 1991, Upshaw played in the Philippine Basketball Association for the Swift Mighty Meaties then went on to join the CBA's Bakersfield Jammers and was traded to the Fort Wayne Fury in a dispersal draft after the Jammers folded. In the summer of 1992, Upshaw returned to play in the Philippine Basketball Association this time with Shell Rimula X before joining the Fury. In February 1993, Upshaw left the Fury to spend time with his family and work at a youth center.

Upshaw was meted a lifetime ban from the PBA for violating the league's anti-drug policy. But he gained notoriety with Filipino basketball fans for showing his butt to the crowd during a televised game in 1992.

He has served as an assistant coach for the CBA's Gary Steelheads, Quad City Thunder, LaCrosse Bobcats, and the NBDL's Charleston Lowgators.

In 2004, he was named as player development coach for the Dallas Mavericks.

== Career statistics ==
Legend
GP	Games played	GS	Games started	MPG	Minutes per game
FG%	Field goal percentage	3P%	3-point field goal percentage	FT%	Free throw percentage
RPG	Rebounds per game	APG	Assists per game	SPG	Steals per game
BPG	Blocks per game	PPG	Points per game	**Bold**	Career high

=== NBA ===
==== Regular season ====
Year	Team	GP	GS	MPG	FG%	3P%	FT%	RPG	APG	SPG	BPG	PPG
1988–89	Miami	9	0	16.0	.413	.200	.667	1.4	2.2	.8	.0	6.3
1988–89	Boston	23	0	**20.6**	**.490**	.200	.700	**1.6**	**4.2**	.8	**.1**	**7.0**
1989–90	Boston	14	0	9.4	.308	**.400**	.667	.9	2.0	.1	**.1**	2.1
1989–90	Dallas	3	0	1.3	.333	.000	–	.0	.0	.0	.0	.7
1989–90	Golden State	23	0	11.0	**.490**	.222	.774	1.2	1.1	**1.1**	.0	5.6
1990–91	Dallas	**48**	**1**	10.7	.450	.241	**.859**	1.1	1.8	.6	**.1**	5.6
Career		120	1	12.7	.453	.237	.795	1.2	2.1	.7	.1	5.4

==== Playoffs ====
Year	Team	GP	GS	MPG	FG%	3P%	FT%	RPG	APG	SPG	BPG	PPG
1989	Boston	3	0	8.0	.417	–	–	.7	1.7	.3	.0	3.3
