= John Shasky =

American basketball player

Personal information
- Born: July 31, 1964 (age 62) Birmingham, Michigan, U.S.
- Listed height: 6 ft 11 in (2.11 m)
- Listed weight: 235 lb (107 kg)

Career information
- High school: Brother Rice (Birmingham, Michigan)
- College: Minnesota (1982–1986)
- NBA draft: 1986: 3rd round, 61st overall pick
- Drafted by: Utah Jazz
- Playing career: 1986–1996
- Position: Center
- Number: 45, 55

Career history
- 1986–1987: Cholet
- 1987: Basket Brescia
- 1987–1988: Rapid City Thrillers
- 1988–1989: Miami Heat
- 1989–1990: Golden State Warriors
- 1990–1991: Dallas Mavericks
- 1991–1992: Pallacanestro Trapani
- 1992–1993: Iraklis Thessaloniki
- 1993: Papagou Athens
- 1994: Fórum Filatélico
- 1994–1995: Apollon Patras
- 1995–1996: Joventut Badalona

Career highlights
- Second-team All-Big Ten (1986)
- Stats at NBA.com
- Stats at Basketball Reference

John Paul Shasky (born July 31, 1964) is an American former professional basketball player, a 6-foot-11-inch (211 cm) and 235 pounds (107 kg) center. Born in Birmingham, Michigan, he played collegiately for the Minnesota Golden Gophers for four seasons (from 1982 to 1986).

Shasky was selected with the 14th pick of the third round (61st pick overall) in the 1986 NBA draft by the Utah Jazz. He played in the NBA for 3 seasons for the Miami Heat (1988–89), Golden State Warriors (1989–90), and Dallas Mavericks (1990–91), averaging 3.8 points and 2.8 rebounds per game in 11.1 minutes per game on average.

== Career statistics ==
Legend
GP	Games played	GS	Games started	MPG	Minutes per game
FG%	Field goal percentage	3P%	3-point field goal percentage	FT%	Free throw percentage
RPG	Rebounds per game	APG	Assists per game	SPG	Steals per game
BPG	Blocks per game	PPG	Points per game	**Bold**	Career high

=== NBA ===
==== Regular season ====
Year	Team	GP	GS	MPG	FG%	3P%	FT%	RPG	APG	SPG	BPG	PPG
1988–89	Miami	**65**	**4**	**14.5**	**.488**	.000	**.689**	**3.6**	**.3**	**.2**	.2	**5.5**
1989–90	Golden State	14	0	3.6	.286	–	.333	.9	.1	.1	.1	.7
1990–91	Dallas	57	0	8.9	.440	–	.608	2.4	.2	**.2**	**.4**	2.6
Career		136	4	11.1	.466	.000	.655	2.8	.3	.2	.3	3.8
