= 1989–90 Houston Rockets season =

Rockets' 23rd season in the National Basketball Association

- Head coach: Don Chaney
- General manager: Steve Patterson
- Owner: Charlie Thomas
- Arena: The Summit

Results
- Record: 41–41 (.500)
- Place: Division: 5th (Midwest); Conference: 8th (Western)
- Playoff finish: First round (lost to Lakers 1–3)
- Stats at Basketball Reference

Local media
- Television: KTXH; Home Sports Entertainment
- Radio: KTRH

The 1989–90 Houston Rockets season was the 23rd season for the Houston Rockets in the National Basketball Association, and their 19th season in Houston, Texas, United States.

== Season summary ==
=== Off-season ===
During the off-season, the Rockets signed free agents John Lucas and Larry Smith.

=== Regular season ===
With the addition of Smith, the Rockets got off to a 9–6 start to the regular season, but then struggled holding a 12–18 record as of December 30, 1989. However, the team managed to win seven of their next nine games, and later on held a 22–25 record at the All-Star break. At mid-season, the team acquired second-year guard Vernon Maxwell from the San Antonio Spurs. With the addition of Maxwell, the Rockets posted a six-game winning streak in March, and continued to play around .500 in winning percentage for the remainder of the season, finishing in fifth place in the Midwest Division with a 41–41 record; the team won a tie-breaker over the Seattle SuperSonics for the eighth seed in the Western Conference, and qualified for the NBA playoffs for the sixth consecutive year.

Akeem Olajuwon averaged 24.3 points, 14.0 rebounds, 2.1 steals and 4.6 blocks per game, and was named to the All-NBA Second Team, and to the NBA All-Defensive First Team. In addition, Otis Thorpe averaged 17.1 points and 9.0 rebounds per game, while Mitchell Wiggins averaged 15.5 points and 1.3 steals per game, Buck Johnson provided the team with 14.8 points and 1.3 steals per game, and Sleepy Floyd contributed 12.2 points and 7.3 assists per game. Off the bench, Mike Woodson contributed 6.5 points per game, while Lucas provided with 5.8 points and 4.9 assists per game, and Smith averaged 3.0 points and 6.1 rebounds per game.

During the NBA All-Star weekend at the Miami Arena in Miami, Florida, Olajuwon was selected for the 1990 NBA All-Star Game, as a member of the Western Conference All-Star team; he finished in seventh place in Most Valuable Player voting, and also finished in second place in Defensive Player of the Year voting, behind Dennis Rodman of the Detroit Pistons.

The Rockets finished eleventh in the NBA in home-game attendance, with an attendance of 649,702 at The Summit during the regular season.

=== NBA playoffs ===
In the Western Conference First Round of the 1990 NBA playoffs, the Rockets faced off against the top–seeded, and Pacific Division champion Los Angeles Lakers, who were led by the quartet of All-Star guard, and Most Valuable Player of the Year, Magic Johnson, All-Star forward James Worthy, Byron Scott, and All-Star forward A.C. Green. The Rockets lost the first two games to the Lakers on the road at the Great Western Forum, but managed to win Game 3 at home, 114–108 at The Summit. However, the Rockets lost Game 4 to the Lakers at home, 109–88, thus losing the series in four games.

=== Aftermath ===
Following the season, Wiggins was released to free agency, and Lucas and Tim McCormick were both traded to the Atlanta Hawks.

== Draft picks ==
The Rockets had no draft picks in 1989.

== Roster ==
1989–90 Houston Rockets roster
Players

Pos.	No.	Player	Height	Weight	DOB	From
G	25	Anthony Bowie	6 ft 6 in (1.98 m)	190 lb (86 kg)	1963–11–09	Oklahoma
F	44	Adrian Caldwell	6 ft 8 in (2.03 m)	265 lb (120 kg)	1966–07–04	Lamar
G	9	Byron Dinkins	6 ft 1 in (1.85 m)	170 lb (77 kg)	1967–06–15	Charlotte
G	21	Sleepy Floyd	6 ft 3 in (1.91 m)	170 lb (77 kg)	1960–03–06	Georgetown
F	1	Buck Johnson	6 ft 7 in (2.01 m)	190 lb (86 kg)	1964–01–03	Alabama
G	32	Lewis Lloyd	6 ft 6 in (1.98 m)	205 lb (93 kg)	1959–02–22	Drake
G	10	John Lucas	6 ft 3 in (1.91 m)	175 lb (79 kg)	1953–10–31	Maryland
G	11	Vernon Maxwell	6 ft 4 in (1.93 m)	180 lb (82 kg)	1965–09–12	Florida
C	40	Tim McCormick	6 ft 11 in (2.11 m)	240 lb (109 kg)	1962–03–10	Michigan
C	34	Akeem Olajuwon	7 ft 0 in (2.13 m)	255 lb (116 kg)	1963–01–21	Houston
F	13	Larry Smith	6 ft 8 in (2.03 m)	215 lb (98 kg)	1958–01–18	Alcorn State
F	33	Otis Thorpe	6 ft 9 in (2.06 m)	225 lb (102 kg)	1962–08–05	Providence
G	23	Mitchell Wiggins	6 ft 4 in (1.93 m)	185 lb (84 kg)	1959–09–28	Florida State
G	42	Mike Woodson	6 ft 5 in (1.96 m)	195 lb (88 kg)	1958–03–24	Indiana

Coaches
Head coach
- Don Chaney
Assistant(s)
- Carroll Dawson
- John Killilea
- Rudy Tomjanovich

Legend
- (DP) Unsigned draft pick
- (FA) Free agent
- (S) Suspended
- Injured

Roster
Updated: March 19, 1990

== Regular season ==
=== Season standings ===
Midwest Division	W	L	PCT	GB	Home	Road	Div
y-San Antonio Spurs	56	26	.683	–	34–7	22–19	19–9
x-Utah Jazz	55	27	.671	1	36–5	19–22	21–7
x-Dallas Mavericks	47	35	.573	9	30–11	17–24	17–11
x-Denver Nuggets	43	39	.524	13	28–13	15–26	15–13
x-Houston Rockets	41	41	.500	15	31–10	10–31	13–15
Minnesota Timberwolves	22	60	.268	34	17–24	5–36	6–22
Charlotte Hornets	19	63	.232	37	13–28	6–35	7–21

#	Western Conference				
#	Team	W	L	PCT	GB
1	z-Los Angeles Lakers	63	19	.768	–
2	y-San Antonio Spurs	56	26	.683	7
3	x-Portland Trail Blazers	59	23	.720	4
4	x-Utah Jazz	55	27	.671	8
5	x-Phoenix Suns	54	28	.659	9
6	x-Dallas Mavericks	47	35	.573	16
7	x-Denver Nuggets	43	39	.524	20
8	x-Houston Rockets	41	41	.500	22
9	Seattle SuperSonics	41	41	.500	22
10	Golden State Warriors	37	45	.451	26
11	Los Angeles Clippers	30	52	.366	33
12	Sacramento Kings	23	59	.280	40
13	Minnesota Timberwolves	22	60	.268	41
14	Charlotte Hornets	19	63	.232	44

z – clinched division title
y – clinched division title
x – clinched playoff spot

== Playoffs ==
1990 playoff game log
First Round: 1–3 (home: 1–1; road: 0–2)

Game	Date	Team	Score	High points	High rebounds	High assists	Location Attendance	Series
1	April 27	@ L.A. Lakers	L 89–101	Otis Thorpe (21)	Akeem Olajuwon (14)	Sleepy Floyd (8)	Great Western Forum; 17,505	0–1
2	April 29	@ L.A. Lakers	L 100–104	Sleepy Floyd (27)	Akeem Olajuwon (11)	Sleepy Floyd (8)	Great Western Forum; 17,505	0–2
3	May 1	L.A. Lakers	W 114–108	Otis Thorpe (27)	Otis Thorpe (8)	Sleepy Floyd (18)	The Summit; 16,611	1–2
4	May 3	L.A. Lakers	L 88–109	Akeem Olajuwon (28)	Akeem Olajuwon (10)	Sleepy Floyd (10)	The Summit; 16,611	1–3

1990 schedule

== Player statistics ==
Legend
GP	Games played	GS	Games started	MPG	Minutes per game
FG%	Field-goal percentage	3P%	3-point field-goal percentage	FT%	Free-throw percentage
RPG	Rebounds per game	APG	Assists per game	SPG	Steals per game
BPG	Blocks per game	PPG	Points per game

=== Season ===
Player	GP	GS	MPG	FG%	3FG%	FT%	RPG	APG	SPG	BPG	PPG
Anthony Bowie	66	0	13.9	.406	.286	.741	1.8	1.5	.6	.1	4.3
Adrian Caldwell	51	0	6.5	.553		.464	2.1	.1	.2	.4	1.9
Derrick Chievous^{†}	41	0	12.0	.506	.375	.701	1.8	.7	.6	.1	6.0
Byron Dinkins	33	0	11.0	.404	.111	.867	1.2	2.3	.6	.1	3.5
Sleepy Floyd	82	73	32.1	.451	.380	.806	2.4	7.3	1.1	.1	12.2
Buck Johnson	82	82	34.5	.495	.118	.759	4.6	3.1	1.3	.8	14.8
Lewis Lloyd^{†}	19	0	5.9	.569		.563	.9	.6	.2	.0	3.5
John Lucas II	49	18	19.1	.375	.299	.764	1.8	4.9	.9	.0	5.8
Vernon Maxwell^{†}	30	10	29.0	.442	.245	.664	2.9	5.0	1.4	.2	12.5
Tim McCormick	18	0	6.4	.345		.526	1.5	.2	.2	.1	1.7
Chuck Nevitt	3	0	3.0	1.000			1.0	.3	.0	.3	1.3
Akeem Olajuwon	82	82	38.1	.501	.167	.713	14.0	2.9	2.1	4.6	24.3
Larry Smith	74	0	17.6	.474	.000	.364	6.1	.9	.8	.4	3.0
Otis Thorpe	82	82	35.9	.548	.000	.688	9.0	3.2	.8	.3	17.1
Mitchell Wiggins	66	52	28.1	.488	.000	.810	4.3	1.6	1.3	.0	15.5
Mike Woodson	61	11	15.9	.395	.293	.721	1.4	1.1	.7	.2	6.5

=== Playoffs ===
Player	GP	GS	MPG	FG%	3FG%	FT%	RPG	APG	SPG	BPG	PPG
Anthony Bowie	2	0	2.0	.000			.0	.0	.0	.0	.0
Adrian Caldwell	1	0	1.0				.0	.0	.0	.0	.0
Sleepy Floyd	4	4	43.0	.469	.250	.647	3.8	10.3	1.3	.3	18.5
Buck Johnson	4	4	37.0	.417	.000	.846	4.0	2.3	1.5	.5	12.8
Vernon Maxwell	4	4	39.8	.370	.308	.524	3.0	4.3	1.3	.0	19.8
Tim McCormick	3	0	7.0	.333		.500	2.7	.0	.0	.0	1.0
Akeem Olajuwon	4	4	40.3	.443		.706	11.5	2.0	2.5	5.8	18.5
Larry Smith	4	0	18.3	.750			3.3	1.3	1.0	.0	3.0
Otis Thorpe	4	4	41.0	.600		.684	8.3	1.8	1.3	.0	20.0
Mitchell Wiggins	4	0	12.8	.467		.667	3.3	.5	.3	.0	4.0
Mike Woodson	1	0	6.0	.333	.000		.0	2.0	.0	.0	2.0

Player statistics citation:

== Awards and records ==
- Akeem Olajuwon, All-NBA Second Team
- Akeem Olajuwon, NBA All-Defensive First Team

== See also ==
- 1989–90 NBA season
