= 1989–90 Dallas Mavericks season =

NBA professional basketball team season

- Head coach: John MacLeod (fired) (5–6); Richie Adubato (42–29)
- General manager: Norm Sonju
- Owner: Don Carter
- Arena: Reunion Arena

Results
- Record: 47–35 (.573)
- Place: Division: 3rd (Midwest); Conference: 6th (Western)
- Playoff finish: First round (lost to Trail Blazers 0–3)
- Stats at Basketball Reference

Local media
- Television: KTVT; Home Sports Entertainment
- Radio: WBAP

The 1989–90 Dallas Mavericks season was the tenth season for the Dallas Mavericks in the National Basketball Association.

== Season summary ==
=== Off-season ===
A year after missing the NBA playoffs, the Mavericks received the eighth overall pick in the 1989 NBA draft, and selected power forward Randy White out of Louisiana Tech University.

=== Regular season ===
After a 5–6 start to the regular season, head coach John MacLeod was fired and replaced with assistant coach Richie Adubato. In November, Roy Tarpley was arrested for driving under the influence of drugs, and only played just 45 games. The Mavericks played below .500 in winning percentage with a 17–20 start to the regular season, but then posted a seven-game winning streak in January, and later on held a 26–22 record at the All-Star break. In January, the team released Adrian Dantley to free agency; Dantley averaged 14.7 points per game in 45 games with the team. The Mavericks posted a six-game winning streak in March, and finished in third place in the Midwest Division with a 47–35 record, earning the sixth seed in the Western Conference, and returning to the NBA playoffs after a one-year absence.

Rolando Blackman averaged 19.4 points and 3.6 assists per game, while Derek Harper averaged 18.0 points, 7.4 assists and 2.3 steals per game, and was named to the NBA All-Defensive Second Team, and Tarpley provided the team with 16.8 points, 13.1 rebounds and 1.6 blocks per game. In addition, Sam Perkins contributed 15.9 points and 7.5 rebounds per game, and James Donaldson provided with 9.1 points and 8.6 rebounds per game. Off the bench, Herb Williams averaged 8.6 points, 4.8 rebounds and 1.3 blocks per game, while Brad Davis contributed 6.4 points and 3.3 assists per game, Bill Wennington provided with 4.5 points and 3.3 rebounds per game, and White averaged 4.3 points and 3.1 rebounds per game.

During the NBA All-Star weekend at the Miami Arena in Miami, Florida, Blackman was selected for the 1990 NBA All-Star Game, as a member of the Western Conference All-Star team; it was his final All-Star appearance. Harper finished tied in third place in Defensive Player of the Year voting, while Tarpley finished tied in sixth place in Most Improved Player voting. The Mavericks finished ninth in the NBA in home-game attendance, with an attendance of 691,490 at the Reunion Arena during the regular season.

=== NBA playoffs ===
In the Western Conference First Round of the 1990 NBA playoffs, the Mavericks faced off against the 3rd–seeded Portland Trail Blazers, who were led by the quartet of All-Star guard Clyde Drexler, Terry Porter, All-Star center Kevin Duckworth and Jerome Kersey. The Mavericks lost the first two games to the Trail Blazers on the road at the Memorial Coliseum, before losing Game 3 at home, 106–92 at the Reunion Arena, thus losing the series in a three-game sweep; this would be the Mavericks' final NBA playoff appearance until the 2000–01 season, as what would follow was a ten-year playoff drought.

The Trail Blazers would advance to the NBA Finals, but would lose to the defending NBA champion Detroit Pistons in five games in the 1990 NBA Finals.

=== Aftermath ===
Following the season, Perkins signed as a free agent with the Los Angeles Lakers after six seasons with the Mavericks.

== Draft picks ==
Round	Pick	Player	Position	Nationality	College
1	8	Randy White	PF	United States	Louisiana Tech
2	35	Pat Durham	F	United States	Colorado State
2	53	Jeff Hodge		United States	South Alabama

== Roster ==
1989–90 Dallas Mavericks roster
Players

Pos.	No.	Player	Height	Weight	DOB	From
G	2	Steve Alford	6 ft 2 in (1.88 m)	183 lb (83 kg)	1964–11–23	Indiana
G/F	22	Rolando Blackman	6 ft 6 in (1.98 m)	190 lb (86 kg)	1959–02–26	Kansas State
G	15	Brad Davis	6 ft 3 in (1.91 m)	180 lb (82 kg)	1955–12–17	Maryland
C	40	James Donaldson	7 ft 2 in (2.18 m)	275 lb (125 kg)	1957–08–16	Washington State
G	12	Derek Harper	6 ft 4 in (1.93 m)	185 lb (84 kg)	1961–10–13	Illinois
G	21	Anthony Jones	6 ft 6 in (1.98 m)	195 lb (88 kg)	1962–09–13	UNLV
F	7	Bob McCann	6 ft 6 in (1.98 m)	244 lb (111 kg)	1964–04–22	Morehead State
F/C	44	Sam Perkins	6 ft 9 in (2.06 m)	235 lb (107 kg)	1961–06–14	North Carolina
F/C	42	Roy Tarpley	6 ft 11 in (2.11 m)	230 lb (104 kg)	1964–11–28	Michigan
C	23	Bill Wennington	7 ft 0 in (2.13 m)	245 lb (111 kg)	1963–04–26	St. John's
F	33	Randy White	6 ft 8 in (2.03 m)	240 lb (109 kg)	1967–11–04	Louisiana Tech
C	32	Herb Williams	6 ft 10 in (2.08 m)	242 lb (110 kg)	1958–02–16	Ohio State

Coaches
Head coach
- Richie Adubato
Assistant(s)
- Garfield Heard
- Clifford Ray

Legend
- (DP) Unsigned draft pick
- (FA) Free agent
- (S) Suspended
- Injured

=== Roster notes ===
- Small forward Adrian Dantley was waived on April 2, 1990.
- Center James Donaldson holds both American and British citizenship.

== Regular season ==
=== Season standings ===
Midwest Division	W	L	PCT	GB	Home	Road	Div
y-San Antonio Spurs	56	26	.683	–	34–7	22–19	19–9
x-Utah Jazz	55	27	.671	1	36–5	19–22	21–7
x-Dallas Mavericks	47	35	.573	9	30–11	17–24	17–11
x-Denver Nuggets	43	39	.524	13	28–13	15–26	15–13
x-Houston Rockets	41	41	.500	15	31–10	10–31	13–15
Minnesota Timberwolves	22	60	.268	34	17–24	5–36	6–22
Charlotte Hornets	19	63	.232	37	13–28	6–35	7–21

#	Western Conference				
#	Team	W	L	PCT	GB
1	z-Los Angeles Lakers	63	19	.768	–
2	y-San Antonio Spurs	56	26	.683	7
3	x-Portland Trail Blazers	59	23	.720	4
4	x-Utah Jazz	55	27	.671	8
5	x-Phoenix Suns	54	28	.659	9
6	x-Dallas Mavericks	47	35	.573	16
7	x-Denver Nuggets	43	39	.524	20
8	x-Houston Rockets	41	41	.500	22
9	Seattle SuperSonics	41	41	.500	22
10	Golden State Warriors	37	45	.451	26
11	Los Angeles Clippers	30	52	.366	33
12	Sacramento Kings	23	59	.280	40
13	Minnesota Timberwolves	22	60	.268	41
14	Charlotte Hornets	19	63	.232	44

z - clinched division title
y - clinched division title
x - clinched playoff spot

=== Game log ===
1989–90 game log
Total: 47–35 (home: 0–0; road: 0–0)
November: 0–0 (home: 0–0; road: 0–0)

Game	Date	Team	Score	High points	High rebounds	High assists	Location Attendance	Record

December: 0–0 (home: 0–0; road: 0–0)

Game	Date	Team	Score	High points	High rebounds	High assists	Location Attendance	Record

January: 0–0 (home: 0–0; road: 0–0)

Game	Date	Team	Score	High points	High rebounds	High assists	Location Attendance	Record

February: 0–0 (home: 0–0; road: 0–0)

Game	Date	Team	Score	High points	High rebounds	High assists	Location Attendance	Record

March: 0–0 (home: 0–0; road: 0–0)

Game	Date	Team	Score	High points	High rebounds	High assists	Location Attendance	Record

April: 0–0 (home: 0–0; road: 0–0)

Game	Date	Team	Score	High points	High rebounds	High assists	Location Attendance	Record

1989–90 schedule

== Playoffs ==
1990 playoff game log
First round: 0–3 (home: 0–1; road: 0–2)

Game	Date	Team	Score	High points	High rebounds	High assists	Location Attendance	Series
1	April 26	@ Portland	L 102–109	Derek Harper (24)	Roy Tarpley (14)	Derek Harper (7)	Memorial Coliseum; 12,884	0–1
2	April 28	@ Portland	L 107–114	Derek Harper (23)	Roy Tarpley (17)	Derek Harper (5)	Memorial Coliseum; 12,884	0–2
3	May 1	Portland	L 92–106	Rolando Blackman (23)	Roy Tarpley (15)	Derek Harper (12)	Reunion Arena; 17,007	0–3

1990 schedule

== Player statistics ==
=== Ragular season ===
Player	POS	GP	GS	MP	REB	AST	STL	BLK	PTS	MPG	RPG	APG	SPG	BPG	PPG
Derek Harper	PG	82	82	3,007	244	609	187	26	1,473	36.7	3.0	7.4	2.3	.3	18.0
Herb Williams	C	81	19	2,199	391	119	51	106	700	27.1	4.8	1.5	.6	1.3	8.6
Rolando Blackman	SG	80	80	2,934	280	289	77	21	1,552	36.7	3.5	3.6	1.0	.3	19.4
Sam Perkins	SF	76	70	2,668	572	175	88	64	1,206	35.1	7.5	2.3	1.2	.8	15.9
James Donaldson	C	73	73	2,265	630	57	22	47	665	31.0	8.6	.8	.3	.6	9.1
Brad Davis	PG	73	2	1,292	93	242	47	9	470	17.7	1.3	3.3	.6	.1	6.4
Anthony Jones	SG	66	0	650	82	29	32	16	195	9.8	1.2	.4	.5	.2	3.0
Bill Wennington	C	60	2	814	198	41	20	21	270	13.6	3.3	.7	.3	.4	4.5
Randy White	PF	55	2	707	173	21	24	6	237	12.9	3.1	.4	.4	.1	4.3
Adrian Dantley	SF	45	45	1,300	172	80	20	7	662	28.9	3.8	1.8	.4	.2	14.7
Roy Tarpley	PF	45	35	1,648	589	67	79	70	758	36.6	13.1	1.5	1.8	1.6	16.8
Steve Alford	PG	41	0	302	25	39	15	3	168	7.4	.6	1.0	.4	.1	4.1
Bob McCann	SF	10	0	62	12	6	2	2	26	6.2	1.2	.6	.2	.2	2.6
Kelvin Upshaw^{†}	SG	3	0	4	0	0	0	0	2	1.3	.0	.0	.0	.0	.7
Mark Wade	PG	1	0	3	0	2	0	0	0	3.0	.0	2.0	.0	.0	.0

- ^{†} Denotes player spent time with another team in the season. Stats reflect time with the Mavericks only.

=== Playoffs ===
Player	POS	GP	GS	MP	REB	AST	STL	BLK	PTS	MPG	RPG	APG	SPG	BPG	PPG
Roy Tarpley	PF	3	3	129	46	1	7	10	50	43.0	15.3	.3	2.3	3.3	16.7
Rolando Blackman	SG	3	3	127	9	13	6	2	60	42.3	3.0	4.3	2.0	.7	20.0
Derek Harper	PG	3	3	119	8	23	4	0	58	39.7	2.7	7.7	1.3	.0	19.3
Sam Perkins	SF	3	3	118	22	8	3	2	45	39.3	7.3	2.7	1.0	.7	15.0
James Donaldson	C	3	3	74	16	2	2	0	22	24.7	5.3	.7	.7	.0	7.3
Herb Williams	C	3	0	81	13	5	1	2	41	27.0	4.3	1.7	.3	.7	13.7
Steve Alford	PG	3	0	42	3	8	1	0	23	14.0	1.0	2.7	.3	.0	7.7
Bill Wennington	C	3	0	25	3	1	0	1	2	8.3	1.0	.3	.0	.3	.7
Anthony Jones	SG	1	0	3	0	0	0	0	0	3.0	.0	.0	.0	.0	.0
Randy White	PF	1	0	2	0	0	0	0	0	2.0	.0	.0	.0	.0	.0

== Awards and records ==
- Derek Harper, NBA All-Defensive Second Team
- Rolando Blackman, NBA All-Star Game

== Transactions ==
=== Trades ===
October 26, 1989
To Dallas Mavericks----
- 1993 2nd round draft pick (Eric Riley)
To Milwaukee Bucks----
- Pat Durham

=== Free agents ===
Player	Signed	Former team
John Long	October 3, 1989	Detroit Pistons
Steve Alford	October 5, 1989	Golden State Warriors

Subtractions
Player	Date signed	New team
Morlon Wiley	Expansion Draft June 15, 1989	Orlando Magic

== See also ==
- 1989-90 NBA season
