= 1989–90 Denver Nuggets season =

NBA professional basketball team season

- Head coach: Doug Moe
- Arena: McNichols Sports Arena

Results
- Record: 43–39 (.524)
- Place: Division: 4th (Midwest); Conference: 7th (Western)
- Playoff finish: West First Round (lost to Spurs 0–3)
- Stats at Basketball Reference

Local media
- Television: KTVD; KMGH-TV; Prime Sports Rocky Mountain
- Radio: KOA

The 1989–90 Denver Nuggets season was the 14th season for the Denver Nuggets in the National Basketball Association, and their 23rd season as a franchise.

== Season summary ==
=== Off-season ===
The Nuggets had the 15th overall pick in the 1989 NBA draft, and selected shooting guard Todd Lichti out of Stanford University.

=== Regular season ===
The Nuggets got off to a fast start by winning 11 of their first 15 games of the regular season, which included a seven-game winning streak between November and December. The team got off to a solid 19–9 start to the season, but then lost 10 of their next 14 games, and held a 26–20 record at the All-Star break. At mid-season, the team acquired former All-Star center Joe Barry Carroll from the New Jersey Nets. The Nuggets played below .500 in winning percentage for the remainder of the season, and finished in fourth place in the Midwest Division with a 43–39 record, earning the seventh seed in the Western Conference; the team qualified for the NBA playoffs for the ninth consecutive year.

Fat Lever averaged 18.3 points, 9.3 rebounds, 6.5 assists and 2.1 steals per game, while Alex English averaged 17.9 points per game, and sixth man Walter Davis provided the team with 17.5 points per game off the bench. In addition, Michael Adams contributed 15.5 points, 6.3 assists and 1.5 steals per game, and led the league with 158 three-point field goals, while Blair Rasmussen provided with 12.4 points, 7.3 rebounds and 1.3 blocks per game, and Danny Schayes averaged 10.4 points and 6.5 rebounds per game. Meanwhile, Lichti contributed 8.0 points per game, Bill Hanzlik averaged 6.2 points per game, Tim Kempton provided with 5.4 points and 3.1 rebounds per game, and second-year forward Jerome Lane averaged 5.0 points and 5.4 rebounds per game.

During the NBA All-Star weekend at the Miami Arena in Miami, Florida, Lever was selected for the 1990 NBA All-Star Game, as a member of the Western Conference All-Star team; it was his final All-Star appearance. English was not selected for the NBA All-Star Game this season, as his statistics had decreased compared to the previous season; he also clashed with head coach Doug Moe over his reduced role during the regular season.

The Nuggets finished 24th in the NBA in home-game attendance, with an attendance of 484,288 at the McNichols Sports Arena during the regular season, which was the fourth-lowest in the league.

=== NBA playoffs ===
In the Western Conference First Round of the 1990 NBA playoffs, the Nuggets faced off against the 2nd–seeded, and Midwest Division champion San Antonio Spurs, who were led by All-Star center, and Rookie of the Year, David Robinson, All-Star forward Terry Cummings, and second-year star Willie Anderson. The Nuggets lost the first two games to the Spurs on the road at the HemisFair Arena, before losing Game 3 at home, 131–120 at the McNichols Sports Arena, thus losing the series in a three-game sweep.

=== Aftermath ===
Following the season, an era came to an end as Moe was fired as head coach, while English signed as a free agent with the Dallas Mavericks, Lever was traded to the Mavericks, Schayes was traded to the Milwaukee Bucks, and Barry Carroll was released to free agency.

== Draft picks ==
Round	Pick	Player	Position	Nationality	School/Club team
1	15	Todd Lichti	SG	United States	Stanford
2	42	Michael Cutright	SG	United States	McNeese State
2	47	Reginald Turner	SF	United States	Alabama-Birmingham

== Roster ==
1989–90 Denver Nuggets roster
Players

Pos.	No.	Player	Height	Weight	DOB	From
G	14	Michael Adams	5 ft 10 in (1.78 m)	162 lb (73 kg)	1963–01–19	Boston College
C	11	Joe Barry Carroll	7 ft 0 in (2.13 m)	225 lb (102 kg)	1958–07–24	Purdue
G/F	6	Walter Davis	6 ft 6 in (1.98 m)	193 lb (88 kg)	1954–09–09	North Carolina
G	23	T.R. Dunn	6 ft 4 in (1.93 m)	190 lb (86 kg)	1955–02–01	Alabama
F	2	Alex English	6 ft 7 in (2.01 m)	190 lb (86 kg)	1954–01–05	South Carolina
F	24	Bill Hanzlik	6 ft 7 in (2.01 m)	185 lb (84 kg)	1957–12–06	Notre Dame
F	45	Tim Kempton	6 ft 10 in (2.08 m)	245 lb (111 kg)	1964–01–25	Notre Dame
F	35	Jerome Lane	6 ft 6 in (1.98 m)	230 lb (104 kg)	1966–12–04	Pittsburgh
G	12	Fat Lever	6 ft 3 in (1.91 m)	170 lb (77 kg)	1960–08–18	Arizona State
G	21	Todd Lichti	6 ft 4 in (1.93 m)	205 lb (93 kg)	1967–01–08	Stanford
C	41	Blair Rasmussen	7 ft 0 in (2.13 m)	250 lb (113 kg)	1962–11–13	Oregon
C	34	Danny Schayes	6 ft 11 in (2.11 m)	235 lb (107 kg)	1959–05–10	Syracuse

Coaches
Head coach
- Doug Moe
Assistant(s)
- Allan Bristow
- Doug Moe Jr.

Legend
- (DP) Unsigned draft pick
- (FA) Free agent
- (S) Suspended
- Injured

=== Roster notes ===
- Point guard Eddie Hughes was waived on March 22, 1990.

== Regular season ==
=== Season standings ===
Midwest Division	W	L	PCT	GB	Home	Road	Div
y-San Antonio Spurs	56	26	.683	–	34–7	22–19	19–9
x-Utah Jazz	55	27	.671	1	36–5	19–22	21–7
x-Dallas Mavericks	47	35	.573	9	30–11	17–24	17–11
x-Denver Nuggets	43	39	.524	13	28–13	15–26	15–13
x-Houston Rockets	41	41	.500	15	31–10	10–31	13–15
Minnesota Timberwolves	22	60	.268	34	17–24	5–36	6–22
Charlotte Hornets	19	63	.232	37	13–28	6–35	7–21

#	Western Conference				
#	Team	W	L	PCT	GB
1	z-Los Angeles Lakers	63	19	.768	–
2	y-San Antonio Spurs	56	26	.683	7
3	x-Portland Trail Blazers	59	23	.720	4
4	x-Utah Jazz	55	27	.671	8
5	x-Phoenix Suns	54	28	.659	9
6	x-Dallas Mavericks	47	35	.573	16
7	x-Denver Nuggets	43	39	.524	20
8	x-Houston Rockets	41	41	.500	22
9	Seattle SuperSonics	41	41	.500	22
10	Golden State Warriors	37	45	.451	26
11	Los Angeles Clippers	30	52	.366	33
12	Sacramento Kings	23	59	.280	40
13	Minnesota Timberwolves	22	60	.268	41
14	Charlotte Hornets	19	63	.232	44

z - clinched division title
y - clinched division title
x - clinched playoff spot

== Playoffs ==
1990 playoff game log
First round: 0–3 (home: 0–1; road: 0–2)

Game	Date	Team	Score	High points	High rebounds	High assists	Location Attendance	Series
1	April 26	@ San Antonio	L 103–119	Todd Lichti (22)	Todd Lichti (13)	Lichti, Adams (8)	HemisFair Arena; 15,910	0–1
2	April 28	@ San Antonio	L 120–129	Fat Lever (26)	Fat Lever (16)	Fat Lever (9)	HemisFair Arena; 15,910	0–2
3	May 1	San Antonio	L 120–131	Alex English (24)	Lever, Rasmussen (10)	Fat Lever (8)	McNichols Sports Arena; 15,604	0–3

1990 schedule

== Player statistics ==
Legend
GP	Games played	GS	Games started	MPG	Minutes per game
FG%	Field-goal percentage	3P%	3-point field-goal percentage	FT%	Free-throw percentage
RPG	Rebounds per game	APG	Assists per game	SPG	Steals per game
BPG	Blocks per game	PPG	Points per game

=== Season ===
Player	GP	GS	MPG	FG%	3FG%	FT%	RPG	APG	SPG	BPG	PPG
Michael Adams	79	74	34.1	.402	.366	.850	2.8	6.3	1.5	.0	15.5
Joe Barry Carroll^{†}	30	27	24.0	.432		.743	6.4	1.8	.9	2.0	11.9
Walter Davis	69	0	23.7	.481	.130	.912	2.6	2.2	.9	.1	17.5
T. R. Dunn	65	2	10.1	.454	.000	.667	2.1	.7	.6	.1	1.8
Alex English	80	80	27.6	.491	.400	.880	3.6	2.8	.6	.3	17.9
Bill Hanzlik	81	0	19.8	.452	.194	.743	2.6	2.3	1.0	.4	6.2
Mike Higgins^{†}	5	0	6.4	.375		.875	.6	.4	.2	.0	2.6
Eddie Hughes	60	7	14.9	.411	.408	.676	1.2	1.9	.8	.0	3.5
Tim Kempton	71	14	14.9	.490	.000	.675	3.1	1.7	.4	.1	5.4
Jerome Lane	67	46	14.3	.469	.000	.367	5.4	1.6	.8	.3	5.0
Fat Lever	79	79	35.8	.443	.414	.804	9.3	6.5	2.1	.2	18.3
Todd Lichti	79	4	16.8	.486	.000	.747	1.9	1.5	.7	.2	8.0
Blair Rasmussen	81	55	24.6	.497	.000	.828	7.3	1.0	.5	1.3	12.4
Danny Schayes	53	22	22.5	.494	.000	.852	6.5	1.2	.8	.8	10.4

=== Playoffs ===
Player	GP	GS	MPG	FG%	3FG%	FT%	RPG	APG	SPG	BPG	PPG
Michael Adams	3	3	35.0	.382	.300	.875	2.0	6.0	1.3	.0	13.0
Joe Barry Carroll	3	3	15.3	.563		1.000	3.0	1.0	.3	1.7	6.7
Walter Davis	3	0	23.3	.400	.000	1.000	3.0	2.0	.3	.0	14.0
T. R. Dunn	3	0	10.3				2.3	.7	1.3	.3	.0
Alex English	3	3	25.3	.568		.818	3.0	3.0	.7	.3	19.7
Bill Hanzlik	3	0	26.3	.294	.333	1.000	3.3	3.7	1.7	.7	7.0
Tim Kempton	3	1	10.7	.778		1.000	1.7	1.3	.0	.0	6.0
Jerome Lane	2	2	7.0	.000		.500	.5	1.0	.0	.0	.5
Fat Lever	3	3	37.7	.373	.143	.929	10.7	7.0	2.7	.3	17.3
Todd Lichti	3	0	23.3	.517	.000	.737	6.0	3.0	.3	.0	14.7
Blair Rasmussen	3	0	28.0	.396		.900	8.7	.3	.7	1.3	15.7

Player statistics citation:

== Awards and records ==
- The Nuggets would win the 1990 McDonald's Open after winning games against Italy's Philips Milano and Yugoslavia's Jugoplastika.

== See also ==
- 1989-90 NBA season
