= 1989–90 Los Angeles Clippers season =

NBA professional basketball team season

- Head coach: Don Casey
- General manager: Elgin Baylor
- Owner: Donald Sterling
- Arena: Los Angeles Memorial Sports Arena

Results
- Record: 30–52 (.366)
- Place: Division: 6th (Pacific); Conference: 11th (Western)
- Playoff finish: Did not qualify
- Stats at Basketball Reference

Local media
- Television: KTLA; SportsChannel Los Angeles (Ralph Lawler, Kevin Loughery, Keith Erickson)
- Radio: KRLA (Ralph Lawler, Kevin Loughery, Keith Erickson)

The 1989–90 Los Angeles Clippers season was the 20th season for the Los Angeles Clippers in the National Basketball Association, and their sixth season in Los Angeles, California.

== Season summary ==
=== Off-season ===
The Clippers received the second overall pick in the 1989 NBA draft, and selected power forward Danny Ferry out of Duke University. However, Ferry refused to play for the Clippers, and left to play overseas in Italy; this would force General Manager Elgin Baylor into trading Ferry, along with Reggie Williams to the Cleveland Cavaliers in exchange for Ron Harper in November. During the off-season, the team signed free agent David Rivers.

For the season, the Clippers slightly redesigned their home and road uniforms, changing the side panels, outlines and waistband above their shorts, and replacing the city name "Los Angeles" with the team name "Clippers" on the front of their road jerseys; these uniforms would remain in use until 2000.

=== Regular season ===
After a 12–18 start to the regular season, the Clippers won six of their next seven games, and were approaching .500 in winning percentage with an 18–19 record as of January 20, 1990. However, the team continued to struggle and held a 21–26 record at the All-Star break. At mid-season, the team acquired Winston Garland in a trade with the Golden State Warriors. The Clippers posted a seven-game losing streak in February, and lost their final five games of the season, finishing in sixth place in the Pacific Division with a 30–52 record; the team missed the NBA playoffs for the 14th consecutive year.

Harper averaged 23.0 points, 5.6 rebounds, 4.8 assists and 2.4 steals per game, but only played just 28 games after the trade due to a knee injury, while second-year star Charles D. Smith averaged 21.1 points, 6.7 rebounds and 1.5 blocks per game, and second-year star and last season's top draft pick, Danny Manning, provided the team with 16.3 points and 5.9 rebounds per game. In addition, Ken Norman contributed 16.1 points and 6.7 rebounds per game, while Benoit Benjamin provided with 13.5 points, 9.3 rebounds and 2.6 blocks per game, and second-year guard Gary Grant contributed 13.1 points, 10.0 assists and 2.5 steals per game. Meanwhile, Garland averaged 10.9 points and 5.2 assists per game in 28 games, second-year guard Tom Garrick provided with 7.0 points, 4.0 assists and 1.2 steals per game, rookie shooting guard and second-round draft pick, Jeff Martin, contributed 6.3 points per game, Joe Wolf averaged 4.8 points and 3.0 rebounds per game, and Rivers provided with 4.2 points and 3.0 assists per game.

The Clippers finished 23rd in the NBA in home-game attendance, with an attendance of 486,621 at the Los Angeles Memorial Sports Arena during the regular season, which was the fifth-lowest in the league.

=== Aftermath ===
Following the season, Wolf signed as a free agent with the Denver Nuggets, while Rivers was released to free agency, and Don Casey was fired as head coach.

== Draft picks ==
Round	Pick	Player	Position	Nationality	College
1	2	Danny Ferry	PF	United States	Duke
2	31	Jeff Martin	G	United States	Murray State
2	33	Jay Edwards	G	United States	Indiana

== Roster ==
1989–90 Los Angeles Clippers roster
Players

Pos.	No.	Player	Height	Weight	DOB	From
F/C	51	Ken Bannister	6 ft 9 in (2.06 m)	235 lb (107 kg)	1960–04–01	St. Augustine's
C	00	Benoit Benjamin	7 ft 0 in (2.13 m)	250 lb (113 kg)	1964–11–22	Creighton
G	3	Jay Edwards	6 ft 4 in (1.93 m)	185 lb (84 kg)	1969–01–03	Indiana
G	11	Winston Garland	6 ft 2 in (1.88 m)	170 lb (77 kg)	1964–12–19	Missouri State
G	22	Tom Garrick	6 ft 2 in (1.88 m)	185 lb (84 kg)	1966–07–07	Rhode Island
G	23	Gary Grant	6 ft 3 in (1.91 m)	185 lb (84 kg)	1965–04–21	Michigan
G/F	4	Ron Harper (injured)	6 ft 6 in (1.98 m)	185 lb (84 kg)	1964–01–20	Miami (OH)
G	20	Steve Harris	6 ft 5 in (1.96 m)	195 lb (88 kg)	1963–10–15	Tulsa
F/C	25	Danny Manning	6 ft 10 in (2.08 m)	230 lb (104 kg)	1966–05–17	Kansas
G	15	Jeff Martin	6 ft 5 in (1.96 m)	195 lb (88 kg)	1967–01–14	Murray State
F	33	Ken Norman	6 ft 8 in (2.03 m)	215 lb (98 kg)	1964–09–05	Illinois
G	44	David Rivers	6 ft 0 in (1.83 m)	180 lb (82 kg)	1965–01–20	Notre Dame
F/C	54	Charles D. Smith	6 ft 10 in (2.08 m)	230 lb (104 kg)	1965–07–16	Pittsburgh
C	24	Joe Wolf	6 ft 11 in (2.11 m)	230 lb (104 kg)	1964–12–17	North Carolina
F	42	Michael Young	6 ft 7 in (2.01 m)	220 lb (100 kg)	1961–01–02	Houston

Coaches
Head coach
- Don Casey
Assistant(s)
- Joe Roberts
- Bob Staak
- Dave Twardzik

Legend
- (DP) Unsigned draft pick
- (FA) Free agent
- (S) Suspended
- Injured

=== Roster notes ===
- Point guard David Rivers became the 3rd former Laker to play with the crosstown rival Clippers.

== Regular season ==
=== Season standings ===
Pacific Division	W	L	PCT	GB	Home	Road	Div
y-Los Angeles Lakers	63	19	.768	–	37–4	26–15	22–6
x-Portland Trail Blazers	59	23	.720	4	35–6	24–17	20–8
x-Phoenix Suns	54	28	.659	9	32–9	22–19	20–8
Seattle SuperSonics	41	41	.500	22	30–11	11–30	11–17
Golden State Warriors	37	45	.451	26	27–14	10–31	11–17
Los Angeles Clippers	30	52	.366	33	20–21	10–31	7–21
Sacramento Kings	23	59	.280	40	16–25	7–34	7–21

#	Western Conference				
#	Team	W	L	PCT	GB
1	z-Los Angeles Lakers	63	19	.768	–
2	y-San Antonio Spurs	56	26	.683	7
3	x-Portland Trail Blazers	59	23	.720	4
4	x-Utah Jazz	55	27	.671	8
5	x-Phoenix Suns	54	28	.659	9
6	x-Dallas Mavericks	47	35	.573	16
7	x-Denver Nuggets	43	39	.524	20
8	x-Houston Rockets	41	41	.500	22
9	Seattle SuperSonics	41	41	.500	22
10	Golden State Warriors	37	45	.451	26
11	Los Angeles Clippers	30	52	.366	33
12	Sacramento Kings	23	59	.280	40
13	Minnesota Timberwolves	22	60	.268	41
14	Charlotte Hornets	19	63	.232	44

z - clinched division title
y - clinched division title
x - clinched playoff spot

== Player statistics ==
Legend
GP	Games played	GS	Games started	MPG	Minutes per game
FG%	Field-goal percentage	3P%	3-point field-goal percentage	FT%	Free-throw percentage
RPG	Rebounds per game	APG	Assists per game	SPG	Steals per game
BPG	Blocks per game	PPG	Points per game

=== Regular season ===
Player	GP	GS	MPG	FG%	3FG%	FT%	RPG	APG	SPG	BPG	PPG
Charles Smith	78	76	35.0	.520	.083	.794	6.7	1.5	1.1	1.5	21.1
Joe Wolf	77	19	17.2	.395	.200	.775	3.0	.8	.4	.3	4.8
Tom Garrick	73	22	23.6	.494	.190	.772	2.2	4.0	1.2	.1	7.0
Benoit Benjamin	71	58	32.6	.526	.000	.732	9.3	2.2	.8	2.6	13.5
Danny Manning	71	42	32.0	.533	.000	.741	5.9	2.6	1.3	.5	16.3
Ken Norman	70	64	33.3	.510	.438	.632	6.7	2.3	1.1	.8	16.1
Jeff Martin	69	23	19.6	.411	.133	.705	2.3	.6	.6	.2	6.3
David Rivers	52	11	13.9	.406	.000	.756	1.6	3.0	.6	.0	4.2
Ken Bannister	52	1	11.3	.478	.000	.473	2.2	.3	.3	.1	4.0
Michael Young	45	2	10.2	.474	.308	.711	1.9	.5	.6	.1	4.9
Gary Grant	44	44	34.8	.466	.238	.779	4.4	10.0	2.5	.1	13.1
Ron Harper^{†}	28	28	39.5	.481	.283	.795	5.6	4.8	2.4	1.1	23.0
Winston Garland^{†}	28	15	31.1	.428	.423	.831	3.7	5.2	1.1	.2	10.9
Steve Harris	15	0	6.2	.350		.750	.7	.1	.5	.1	2.1
Carlton McKinney	7	0	14.9	.250	.000	.500	1.7	1.0	.9	.1	2.6
Jim Les^{†}	6	0	14.3	.357	.000	.846	1.2	3.3	.5	.0	3.5
Reggie Williams^{†}	5	5	26.6	.368	.000	.857	3.0	2.0	1.8	.2	12.0
Jay Edwards	4	0	6.5	.429	.000	.333	.5	1.0	.3	.0	1.8
Andre Turner^{†}	3	0	10.3	.154	.000		1.7	1.0	.3	.0	1.3
Torgeir Bryn	3	0	3.3	.000		.667	.7	.0	.7	.3	1.3

- ^{†} Denotes player spent time with another team in the season. Stats reflect time with the Clippers only.

Player statistics citation:

== Transactions ==
The Clippers were involved in the following transactions during the 1989–90 season.

=== Trades ===
November 16, 1989
February 22, 1990
To Los Angeles Clippers

- Ron Harper, 1990 & 1992 first-round draft picks and 1991 second-round draft pick
To Los Angeles Clippers

- Winston Garland
To Cleveland Cavaliers

- Reggie Williams & the draft rights to Danny Ferry
To Golden State Warriors

- 1990 & 1992 second-round draft picks

Player Transactions Citation:
