= 1989–90 Sacramento Kings season =

NBA professional basketball team season

- Head coach: Jerry Reynolds; Dick Motta
- Owners: Joseph Benvenuti; Gregg Lukenbill
- Arena: ARCO Arena

Results
- Record: 23–59 (.280)
- Place: Division: 7th (Pacific); Conference: 12th (Western)
- Playoff finish: Did not qualify
- Stats at Basketball Reference

Local media
- Television: KRBK-TV
- Radio: KFBK

The 1989–90 Sacramento Kings season was the 41st season for the Sacramento Kings in the National Basketball Association, and their fifth season in Sacramento, California.

== Season summary ==
=== Off-season ===
The Kings won the NBA draft lottery, and selected power forward Pervis Ellison from the University of Louisville with the first overall pick in the 1989 NBA draft. During the off-season, the team acquired former All-Star center Ralph Sampson from the Golden State Warriors, and later on signed free agent Greg Kite in November.

However, during the off-season, the Kings were hit with tragedy when last year's first-round draft pick, Ricky Berry, committed suicide on August 14, 1989, at the age of 24; Berry died of a self-inflicted gunshot wound to the head at his suburban home in Sacramento, after an argument with his wife, Valerie. Berry had just completed a stellar rookie season with the Kings, in which he averaged 11.0 points per game, and shot .406 in three-point field-goal percentage in 64 games during the 1988–89 season.

=== Regular season ===
Prior to the start of the regular season, Ellison underwent surgery to remove bone spurs from his right foot and ankle, then later on suffered tendinitis in the toe on his right foot, as he only appeared in just 34 games. After a 6–10 start to the season, the Kings struggled and posted a 10-game losing streak in December. Head coach Jerry Reynolds was fired after a 7–21 start to the season, and was replaced with former Dallas Mavericks coach Dick Motta, who came out of his retirement. The Kings posted a six-game losing streak between January and February, and held a 12–34 record at the All-Star break. At mid-season, the team traded Kenny Smith to the Atlanta Hawks in exchange for Antoine Carr, and Sedric Toney. The Kings lost 13 of their final 14 games of the season, which included a seven-game losing streak between March and April, and six straight losses to close the season, finishing in last place in the Pacific Division with a 23–59 record.

Wayman Tisdale averaged 22.3 points and 7.5 rebounds per game, while Carr averaged 18.6 points and 5.2 rebounds per game in 33 games after the trade, and Danny Ainge provided the team with 17.9 points, 6.0 assists and 1.5 steals per game, and also led them with 108 three-point field goals. In addition, Rodney McCray provided with 16.6 points, 8.2 rebounds and 4.6 assists per game, while second-year guard Vinny Del Negro contributed 9.7 points and 3.3 assists per game, and Harold Pressley averaged 8.8 points and 4.3 rebounds per game. Meanwhile, Ellison averaged 8.0 points, 5.8 rebounds and 1.7 blocks per game, Toney contributed 5.5 points and 3.8 assists per game in 32 games, but only shot .320 in field-goal percentage, Sampson provided with 4.2 points and 3.2 rebounds per game in only just 26 games, and Kite averaged 3.2 points and 5.3 rebounds per game.

During the NBA All-Star weekend at the Miami Arena in Miami, Florida, and before the mid-season trade, Smith participated in the NBA Slam Dunk Contest. Carr finished in sixth place in Sixth Man of the Year voting. The Kings finished seventh in the NBA in home-game attendance, with an attendance of 697,667 at the ARCO Arena II during the regular season.

=== Aftermath ===
Following the season, Ellison was traded to the Washington Bullets in an off-season three-team trade, and after only one season with the Kings, while Ainge was traded to the Portland Trail Blazers, and McCray was dealt to the Dallas Mavericks. Meanwhile, Kite signed as a free agent with the Orlando Magic, and Del Negro, Pressley and Toney were all released to free agency.

== Draft picks ==
Round	Pick	Player	Position	Nationality	College
1	1	Pervis Ellison	C/PF	United States	Louisville

== Roster ==
1989–90 Sacramento Kings roster
Players

Pos.	No.	Player	Height	Weight	DOB	From
G	7	Danny Ainge	6 ft 4 in (1.93 m)	175 lb (79 kg)	1959–03–17	BYU
G	33	Randy Allen	6 ft 8 in (2.03 m)	220 lb (100 kg)	1965–01–26	Florida State
F/C	35	Antoine Carr	6 ft 9 in (2.06 m)	225 lb (102 kg)	1961–07–23	Wichita State
G	15	Vinny Del Negro	6 ft 4 in (1.93 m)	185 lb (84 kg)	1966–08–09	NC State
F/C	42	Pervis Ellison	6 ft 9 in (2.06 m)	210 lb (95 kg)	1967–04–03	Louisville
G	2	Michael Jackson	6 ft 2 in (1.88 m)	183 lb (83 kg)	1964–07–13	Georgetown
C	32	Greg Kite	6 ft 11 in (2.11 m)	250 lb (113 kg)	1961–08–05	BYU
F	22	Rodney McCray	6 ft 7 in (2.01 m)	220 lb (100 kg)	1961–08–29	Louisville
F	21	Harold Pressley	6 ft 7 in (2.01 m)	210 lb (95 kg)	1963–07–14	Villanova
C	50	Ralph Sampson	7 ft 4 in (2.24 m)	228 lb (103 kg)	1960–07–07	Virginia
F/C	23	Wayman Tisdale	6 ft 9 in (2.06 m)	240 lb (109 kg)	1964–06–09	Oklahoma
G	11	Sedric Toney	6 ft 2 in (1.88 m)	178 lb (81 kg)	1962–04–13	Dayton
F	4	Henry Turner	6 ft 7 in (2.01 m)	200 lb (91 kg)	1966–04–18	Cal State Fullerton

Coaches
Head coach
- Dick Motta
Assistant(s)
- Ed Gregory
- Herman Kull

Legend
- (DP) Unsigned draft pick
- (FA) Free agent
- (S) Suspended
- Injured

== Regular season ==
=== Season standings ===
Pacific Division	W	L	PCT	GB	Home	Road	Div
y-Los Angeles Lakers	63	19	.768	–	37–4	26–15	22–6
x-Portland Trail Blazers	59	23	.720	4	35–6	24–17	20–8
x-Phoenix Suns	54	28	.659	9	32–9	22–19	20–8
Seattle SuperSonics	41	41	.500	22	30–11	11–30	11–17
Golden State Warriors	37	45	.451	26	27–14	10–31	11–17
Los Angeles Clippers	30	52	.366	33	20–21	10–31	7–21
Sacramento Kings	23	59	.280	40	16–25	7–34	7–21

#	Western Conference				
#	Team	W	L	PCT	GB
1	z-Los Angeles Lakers	63	19	.768	–
2	y-San Antonio Spurs	56	26	.683	7
3	x-Portland Trail Blazers	59	23	.720	4
4	x-Utah Jazz	55	27	.671	8
5	x-Phoenix Suns	54	28	.659	9
6	x-Dallas Mavericks	47	35	.573	16
7	x-Denver Nuggets	43	39	.524	20
8	x-Houston Rockets	41	41	.500	22
9	Seattle SuperSonics	41	41	.500	22
10	Golden State Warriors	37	45	.451	26
11	Los Angeles Clippers	30	52	.366	33
12	Sacramento Kings	23	59	.280	40
13	Minnesota Timberwolves	22	60	.268	41
14	Charlotte Hornets	19	63	.232	44

z - clinched division title
y - clinched division title
x - clinched playoff spot

== Player statistics ==
Legend
GP	Games played	GS	Games started	MPG	Minutes per game
FG%	Field-goal percentage	3P%	3-point field-goal percentage	FT%	Free-throw percentage
RPG	Rebounds per game	APG	Assists per game	SPG	Steals per game
BPG	Blocks per game	PPG	Points per game

=== Regular season ===
Player	GP	GS	MPG	FG%	3P%	FT%	RPG	APG	SPG	BPG	PPG
Rodney McCray	82	82	39.5	.515	.262	.784	8.2	4.6	.7	.9	16.6
Wayman Tisdale	79	79	37.2	.525	.000	.783	7.5	1.4	.7	.7	22.3
Vinny Del Negro	76	29	24.4	.462	.313	.871	2.6	3.3	.8	.1	9.7
Danny Ainge	75	68	36.4	.438	.374	.831	4.3	6.0	1.5	.2	17.9
Harold Pressley	72	10	22.3	.424	.311	.780	4.3	2.1	.8	.5	8.8
Greg Kite	71	47	21.3	.432	1.000	.500	5.3	1.1	.4	.7	3.2
Randy Allen	63	6	11.8	.444	.000	.535	2.2	.4	.3	.3	3.7
Kenny Smith^{†}	46	46	38.0	.461	.373	.809	2.6	6.6	1.2	.2	15.0
Henry Turner	36	1	8.8	.475	.000	.615	1.4	.6	.5	.2	4.3
Pervis Ellison	34	22	25.5	.442	.000	.628	5.8	1.9	.5	1.7	8.0
Antoine Carr^{†}	33	4	28.0	.482	.000	.806	5.2	2.0	.5	1.0	18.6
Sedric Toney^{†}	32	9	21.3	.320	.320	.793	1.4	3.8	.7	.0	5.5
Ralph Sampson	26	7	16.0	.372	.250	.522	3.2	1.1	.5	.8	4.2
Michael Jackson	17	0	3.4	.273	.500	.500	.4	.5	.3	.0	.6
Mike Williams^{†}	16	0	5.5	.429	.000	.500	1.4	.1	.2	.4	.9
Greg Stokes	11	0	3.1	.111		1.000	.5	.0	.0	.0	.4

- ^{†} Denotes player spent time with another team in the season. Stats reflect time with the Kings only.

Player statistics citation:

== See also ==
- 1989-90 NBA season
