= Leonard Taylor (basketball) =

American basketball player (born 1996)

Personal information
- Born: May 2, 1966 (age 60) Los Angeles, California, U.S.
- Listed height: 6 ft 8 in (2.03 m)
- Listed weight: 220 lb (100 kg)

Career information
- High school: St. Bernard (Playa del Ray, California)
- College: California (1984–1989)
- NBA draft: 1989: undrafted
- Position: Power forward
- Number: 44

Career history
- 1989: Golden State Warriors

Career highlights
- First-team All-Pac-10 (1989); Pac-10 Freshman of the Year (1985); Fourth-team Parade All-American (1984)
- Stats at NBA.com
- Stats at Basketball Reference

Leonard Chester Taylor Jr. (born May 2, 1966) is an American former professional basketball power forward who spent one season in the National Basketball Association (NBA) with the Golden State Warriors during the 1989–90 season. Born in Los Angeles, California, he attended the University of California, where he was a first-team All-Pac-10 selection, and signed with the Warriors as a non-drafted free agent.
