= Tim Kempton =

American basketball player (born 1964)

Personal information
- Born: January 25, 1964 (age 62) New York City, New York, U.S.
- Listed height: 6 ft 10 in (2.08 m)
- Listed weight: 245 lb (111 kg)

Career information
- High school: St. Dominic (Oyster Bay, New York)
- College: Notre Dame (1982–1986)
- NBA draft: 1986: 6th round, 124th overall pick
- Drafted by: Los Angeles Clippers
- Playing career: 1986–2000
- Position: Power forward / center
- Number: 41, 45, 8, 7, 9, 40

Career history
- 1986–1987: Los Angeles Clippers
- 1987–1988: Basket Napoli
- 1988–1989: Charlotte Hornets
- 1989–1990: Denver Nuggets
- 1990–1992: Scaligera Verona
- 1992–1993: Phoenix Suns
- 1994: Charlotte Hornets
- 1994: Aresium Milano
- 1994: Cleveland Cavaliers
- 1994–1995: Limoges CSP
- 1995–1996: Atlanta Hawks
- 1996: CB Girona
- 1996: San Antonio Spurs
- 1996: Galatasaray
- 1997: Orlando Magic
- 1997–1998: Toronto Raptors
- 1998: La Crosse Bobcats
- 1998–1999: CB Girona
- 1999–2000: León Caja España

Career highlights
- Italian Cup (1991); French Cup (1995); McDonald's Championship (1989); Fourth-team Parade All-American (1982); McDonald's All-American (1982)

Career NBA statistics
- Points: 1,259 (4.5 ppg)
- Rebounds: 795 (2.8 rpg)
- Assists: 307 (1.1 apg)
- Stats at NBA.com
- Stats at Basketball Reference

Timothy Joseph Kempton Sr. (born January 25, 1964) is an American former professional basketball who played the power forward and center positions. Born in Jamaica, New York, he played college basketball for the Notre Dame Fighting Irish before having a 14-year professional career, playing 8 seasons in the National Basketball Association (NBA) in addition to seasons in Italy, France, Spain, and Turkey. He was selected in the 6th round (124th pick overall) of the 1986 NBA draft by the Los Angeles Clippers. During his professional career, he won the McDonald's Championship with the Nuggets in 1989 and national cups in Italy, with Scaligera Verona 1991, and France, with Limoges CSP in 1995.

== College career ==
Kempton played for Notre Dame under coach Digger Phelps from 1982 to 1986, appearing in 107 games over 4 season and averaging 8.7 points, 5.6 rebounds, and 1.5 assists on 26.2 minutes per game.

== Professional career ==
Kempton played in 8 NBA seasons for 8 teams. He played for the Clippers (1986–87), Charlotte Hornets (1988–89, 1993–94), Denver Nuggets (1989–90), Phoenix Suns (1992–93), Cleveland Cavaliers (1993–94), Atlanta Hawks (1995–96), San Antonio Spurs (1996–97), Orlando Magic (1997–98) and Toronto Raptors (1997–98). He was also under contract with Philadelphia 76ers (1996). In his NBA career, Kempton played in 280 games and scored a total of 1,259 points. His best year as a professional came during the 1988–89 NBA season as a member of the Hornets, appearing in 79 games and averaging 6.1 ppg.

== Personal ==
His son, Tim Kempton Jr., is also a professional basketball player. Tim also has a daughter, Catherine Kempton, who plays tennis.

== Career statistics ==
Legend
GP	Games played	GS	Games started	MPG	Minutes per game
FG%	Field goal percentage	3P%	3-point field goal percentage	FT%	Free throw percentage
RPG	Rebounds per game	APG	Assists per game	SPG	Steals per game
BPG	Blocks per game	PPG	Points per game	**Bold**	Career high

=== NBA ===
==== Regular season ====
Year	Team	GP	GS	MPG	FG%	3P%	FT%	RPG	APG	SPG	BPG	PPG
1986–87	L.A. Clippers	66	6	14.2	.471	.000	.693	2.9	.8	**.6**	.2	4.4
1988–89	Charlotte	**79**	0	**17.0**	**.510**	.000	.676	**3.8**	1.3	.5	.2	**6.1**
1989–90	Denver	71	**14**	14.9	.490	.000	.675	3.1	**1.7**	.4	.1	5.4
1992–93	Phoenix	30	0	5.6	.396	–	.581	1.3	.6	.1	.1	1.9
1993–94	Charlotte	9	0	11.4	.346	–	.700	1.6	.7	.4	.1	2.8
1993–94	Cleveland	4	0	8.3	.500	–	.333	2.5	.8	.5	.3	3.5
1995–96	Atlanta	3	0	3.7	–	–	–	.7	.3	.0	.0	.0
1996–97	San Antonio	10	0	5.9	.200	–	**1.000**	.8	.2	.1	.1	.4
1997–98	Orlando	3	0	5.0	.000	–	–	.3	.3	.0	.0	.0
1997–98	Toronto	5	0	6.4	.286	–	–	1.0	.4	.2	**.4**	.8
Career		280	20	13.4	.481	.000	.677	2.8	1.1	.4	.2	4.5

==== Playoffs ====
Year	Team	GP	GS	MPG	FG%	3P%	FT%	RPG	APG	SPG	BPG	PPG
1990	Denver	**3**	**1**	10.7	**.778**	–	**1.000**	1.7	1.3	.0	.0	6.0
1994	Cleveland	**3**	**1**	**29.7**	.400	–	**1.000**	**5.3**	**2.7**	**1.0**	.0	**8.7**
Career		6	2	20.2	.500	–	1.000	3.5	2.0	.5	.0	7.3
