= 1989–90 Orlando Magic season =

NBA professional basketball team season (1st season)

- Head coach: Matt Guokas
- General manager: Pat Williams
- Owners: William du Pont III; James Hewitt; Robert Hewitt
- Arena: Orlando Arena

Results
- Record: 18–64 (.220)
- Place: Division: 7th (Central); Conference: 12th (Eastern)
- Playoff finish: Did not qualify
- Stats at Basketball Reference

Local media
- Television: WKCF; Sunshine Network (Chip Caray, Jack Givens, Paul Kennedy)
- Radio: WWZN (David Steele)

The 1989–90 Orlando Magic season was the inaugural season for the Orlando Magic in the National Basketball Association. Several years after local developer and banker Jim Hewitt began promoting the idea of an NBA franchise in Florida, he was awarded the "Orlando Magic". The Magic, along with the Minnesota Timberwolves, joined the NBA as expansion teams in 1989. Hewitt's first move was to hire Philadelphia 76ers General Manager Pat Williams; together, the two convinced the NBA to give Orlando, Florida a franchise after local fans made $100 deposits on season-ticket reservations.

== Season summary ==
=== Off-season ===
The Magic revealed their new primary logo, adding blue, black, silver and white to their color scheme. The team's primary logo featured a silver star as the letter "A" in the city name "Orlando" in black letters, and the team name "Magic" in blue letters with white and black outlines; on the right side of the logo featured a blue basketball with silver seams and black outlines, along with silver shooting stars. The team also revealed new white home uniforms with a black and blue trim and black pinstripes, and new black road uniforms with a white and blue trim and white pinstripes, along with silver stars with blue outlines on the left and right legs of their shorts; the home uniforms featured the team name on the front of their jerseys, while the road uniforms featured the city name.

The team's new primary logo would remain in use until 2000, while the new pinstriped uniforms would last until 1998; the black pinstriped road jerseys would be used as the team's primary road uniforms until 1994, where they added blue pinstriped uniforms, and the black pinstriped jerseys became their alternate. The Magic played their home games at the Orlando Arena.

In the 1989 NBA expansion draft, the Magic selected veteran players like Reggie Theus, Terry Catledge, Otis Smith, Jerry Reynolds, Sam Vincent, Sidney Green, Scott Skiles and Mark Acres. During the off-season, the team signed free agent Jeff Turner. The Magic received the eleventh overall pick in the 1989 NBA draft, and selected shooting guard Nick Anderson from the University of Illinois, and also hired Matt Guokas as their first ever head coach.

=== Regular season ===
The Magic made their NBA regular season debut on November 4, 1989, in which the team lost to the New Jersey Nets by a score of 111–106 at the Orlando Arena, in front of a sellout crowd of 15,077 fans in attendance; Catledge posted a double-double of 25 points and 16 rebounds, while Theus finished with 21 points and 8 rebounds. On November 6, the Magic won their first ever game in franchise history, defeating the New York Knicks by a score of 118–110 at the Orlando Arena; Theus led the team with 24 points, while Catledge posted a double-double of 19 points and 11 rebounds, and Reynolds finished with a double-double of 19 points and 12 rebounds.

The Magic got off to a surprising start to the regular season, reaching .500 in winning percentage by posting a 7–7 record in November. However, the team struggled posting an eight-game losing streak between December and January, and later on held a 14–33 record at the All-Star break. The team posted a seven-game losing streak in February, posted a nine-game losing streak in March, and then posted a 15-game losing streak between March and April, losing 30 of their final 33 games of the season. The Magic finished their inaugural season in last place in the Central Division with a record of 18 wins and 64 losses.

Catledge led the Magic in scoring, averaging 19.4 points and 7.6 rebounds per game, while Theus averaged 18.9 points and 5.4 assists per game, and Smith provided the team with 13.5 points per game. In addition, Reynolds contributed 12.8 points per game, while Anderson contributed 11.5 points per game off the bench, Vincent provided with 11.2 points and 5.6 assists per game, and Green averaged 10.4 points and 8.1 rebounds per game. Meanwhile, rookie small forward, and second-round draft pick Michael Ansley averaged 8.7 points and 5.0 rebounds per game, Skiles contributed 7.7 points and 4.8 assists per game, Turner provided with 5.1 points and 3.8 rebounds per game, and Acres averaged 4.5 points and 5.4 rebounds per game.

The Magic finished twelfth in the NBA in home-game attendance, with an attendance of 617,468 at the Orlando Arena during the regular season.

=== Notable highlights ===
One notable highlight of the inaugural season occurred on February 14, 1990, in a home game against the Chicago Bulls. Before the game, All-Star guard Michael Jordan's number 23 jersey was stolen from the Bulls' locker room at the Orlando Arena; Jordan had to wear a number 12 jersey, and scored 49 points as the Magic defeated the Bulls in overtime, 135–129 in front of 15,077 fans in attendance. Catledge posted a double-double of 34 points and 11 rebounds, while Theus scored 28 points along with 8 assists, and Green finished with a double-double of 16 points and 19 rebounds. Meanwhile, Smith contributed 18 points, and Skiles added 16 points and 8 assists, and made all four of his three-point field-goal attempts off the bench.

=== Aftermath ===
Following the season, Theus was traded to the New Jersey Nets after only one season with the Magic.

== Draft picks ==
Round	Pick	Player	Position	Nationality	School/Club team
1	11	Nick Anderson	SG/SF	United States	Illinois
2	37	Michael Ansley	SF	United States	Alabama

== Roster ==
1989–90 Orlando Magic roster
Players

Pos.	No.	Player	Height	Weight	DOB	From
C	42	Mark Acres	6 ft 11 in (2.11 m)	220 lb (100 kg)	1962–11–15	Oral Roberts
G	25	Nick Anderson	6 ft 6 in (1.98 m)	205 lb (93 kg)	1968–01–20	Illinois
F	45	Michael Ansley	6 ft 7 in (2.01 m)	225 lb (102 kg)	1967–02–08	Alabama
F	33	Terry Catledge	6 ft 8 in (2.03 m)	220 lb (100 kg)	1963–08–22	South Alabama
C	40	Dave Corzine	6 ft 11 in (2.11 m)	250 lb (113 kg)	1956–04–25	DePaul
F/C	21	Sidney Green	6 ft 9 in (2.06 m)	220 lb (100 kg)	1961–01–04	UNLV
G/F	35	Jerry Reynolds	6 ft 8 in (2.03 m)	200 lb (91 kg)	1962–12–23	LSU
G	4	Scott Skiles	6 ft 1 in (1.85 m)	180 lb (82 kg)	1964–03–05	Michigan State
G/F	32	Otis Smith	6 ft 5 in (1.96 m)	210 lb (95 kg)	1964–01–30	Jacksonville
G	24	Reggie Theus	6 ft 6 in (1.98 m)	190 lb (86 kg)	1957–10–13	UNLV
F	31	Jeff Turner	6 ft 9 in (2.06 m)	230 lb (104 kg)	1962–04–09	Vanderbilt
G	11	Sam Vincent	6 ft 2 in (1.88 m)	185 lb (84 kg)	1963–05–18	Michigan State
G	20	Morlon Wiley	6 ft 4 in (1.93 m)	185 lb (84 kg)	1966–09–24	Long Beach State

Coaches
Head coach
- Matt Guokas
Assistant(s)
- John Gabriel
- Bob Weiss

Legend
- (DP) Unsigned draft pick
- (FA) Free agent
- (S) Suspended
- Injured

Roster
Updated: February 23, 1990

== NBA expansion draft ==
Prior to the 1989 NBA draft, the NBA held a coin toss between the Magic and the other new expansion team, the Minnesota Timberwolves, to determine their order for the NBA draft and the expansion draft. The Magic won the coin toss and chose to have the first pick in the expansion draft and pick 11th in the NBA draft, while the Timberwolves picked second in the expansion draft and 10th in the NBA draft.

The previous season's expansion teams, the Charlotte Hornets and Miami Heat, were not involved in this year's expansion draft and did not lose any player.

== Regular season ==
=== Season standings ===
Central Division	W	L	PCT	GB	Home	Road	Div
y-Detroit Pistons	59	23	.720	–	35–6	24–17	22–8
x-Chicago Bulls	55	27	.671	4	36–5	19–22	20–10
x-Milwaukee Bucks	44	38	.537	15	27–14	17–24	14–16
x-Cleveland Cavaliers	42	40	.512	17	27–14	15–26	14–16
x-Indiana Pacers	42	40	.512	17	28–13	14–27	16–14
Atlanta Hawks	41	41	.500	18	25–16	16–25	15–15
Orlando Magic	18	64	.220	41	12–29	6–35	4–26

#	Eastern Conference				
#	Team	W	L	PCT	GB
1	c-Detroit Pistons	59	23	.720	–
2	y-Philadelphia 76ers	53	29	.646	6
3	x-Chicago Bulls	55	27	.671	4
4	x-Boston Celtics	52	30	.634	7
5	x-New York Knicks	45	37	.549	14
6	x-Milwaukee Bucks	44	38	.537	15
7	x-Cleveland Cavaliers	42	40	.512	17
8	x-Indiana Pacers	42	40	.512	17
9	Atlanta Hawks	41	41	.500	18
10	Washington Bullets	31	51	.378	28
11	Miami Heat	18	64	.220	41
12	Orlando Magic	18	64	.220	41
13	New Jersey Nets	17	65	.207	42

z – clinched division title
y – clinched division title
x – clinched playoff spot

== Game log ==
=== Regular season ===
1989–90 game log
Total: 18–64 (Home: 12–29; Road: 6–35)
November: 7–7 (home: 4–3; road: 3–4)

Game	Date	Team	Score	High points	High rebounds	High assists	Location Attendance	Record
1	November 4	New Jersey	L 106–111	Terry Catledge (25)	Terry Catledge (16)	Scott Skiles (7)	Orlando Arena; 15,077	0–1
2	November 6	New York	W 118–110	Reggie Theus (24)	Jerry Reynolds (12)	Scott Skiles, (8)	Orlando Arena; 15,077	1–1
3	November 8	@ Cleveland	W 117–110	Reggie Theus (26)	Terry Catledge (12)	Sam Vincent (11)	Richfield Coliseum; 14,110	2–1
4	November 10	Detroit	L 121–125	Terry Catledge (27)	Sidney Green (10)	Sam Vincent (10)	Orlando Arena; 15,077	2–2
5	November 11	@ Atlanta	L 109–148	Reggie Theus (25)	Terry Catledge (11)	Scott Skiles (7)	Omni Coliseum; 12,505	2–3
6	November 13	Atlanta	L 112–104	Jerry Reynolds, Terry Catledge (18)	Terry Catledge (11)	Jerry Reynolds (4)	Orlando Arena; 15,077	2–4
7	November 14	@ Charlotte	L 116–130	Jerry Reynolds (22)	Nick Anderson (8)	Reggie Theus (8)	Charlotte Coliseum; 23,901	2–5
8	November 16	@ Milwaukee	L 113–132	Reggie Theus (33)	Mark Acres (13)	Nick Anderson, Reggie Theus (4)	Bradley Center; 13,298	2–6
9	November 18	Philadelphia	W 116–103	Reggie Theus (30)	Terry Catledge (14)	Sam Vincent (16)	Orlando Arena; 15,077	3–6
10	November 21	@ Sacramento	W 115–113	Jerry Reynolds (28)	Mark Acres (10)	Sam Vincent (6)	ARCO Arena; 17,014	4–6
11	November 22	@ Utah	W 119–97	Reynolds, Green, Vincent (22)	Sidney Green (13)	Reggie Theus (13)	Salt Palace; 12,616	5–6
12	November 24	@ Phoenix	L 94–121	Michael Ansley (20)	Michael Ansley (13)	Sam Vincent, Morlon Wiley (4)	Arizona Veterans Memorial Coliseum; 13,173	5–7
13	November 28	Miami	W 104–99	Terry Catledge (26)	Sidney Green (13)	Sam Vincent (10)	Orlando Arena; 15,077	6–7
14	November 30	Minnesota	W 103–96	Terry Catledge (25)	Terry Catledge (12)	Reggie Theus (8)	Orlando Arena; 15,077	7–7

December: 2–13 (home: 2–4; road: 0–9)

Game	Date	Team	Score	High points	High rebounds	High assists	Location Attendance	Record
15	December 1	@ Indiana						
16	December 4	Portland						
17	December 6	Atlanta						
18	December 8	@ Miami	L 114–122 (OT)				Miami Arena	7–11
19	December 10	L.A. Lakers						
20	December 12	@ Milwaukee						
21	December 14	@ Chicago						
22	December 16	@ San Antonio						
23	December 17	@ Houston						
24	December 20	Chicago						
25	December 22	Denver						
26	December 23	@ Detroit						
27	December 26	@ Indiana						
28	December 27	Indiana						
29	December 30	@ New York						

January: 4–10 (home: 3–5; road: 1–5)

Game	Date	Team	Score	High points	High rebounds	High assists	Location Attendance	Record
30	January 2	Detroit						
31	January 5	@ Chicago						
32	January 6	Cleveland						
33	January 8	San Antonio						
34	January 10	@ L.A. Lakers						
35	January 11	@ Denver						
36	January 13	@ Golden State						
37	January 17	Boston						
38	January 19	New Jersey						
39	January 22	Phoenix						
40	January 24	@ Philadelphia						
41	January 25	@ New Jersey						
42	January 27	Atlanta						
43	January 30	Indiana						

February: 3–10 (home: 3–3; road: 0–7)

Game	Date	Team	Score	High points	High rebounds	High assists	Location Attendance	Record
44	February 1	@ Milwaukee						
45	February 3	L.A. Clippers						
46	February 6	New York						
47	February 8	Philadelphia						
48	February 14	Chicago						
49	February 15	@ Atlanta						
50	February 17	@ Dallas						
51	February 20	Seattle						
52	February 21	@ Detroit						
53	February 23	@ Cleveland						
54	February 24	@ Washington						
55	February 26	@ Philadelphia						
56	February 27	Charlotte	W 115–109				Orlando Arena	16–40

March: 1–13 (home: 0–8; road: 1–5)

Game	Date	Team	Score	High points	High rebounds	High assists	Location Attendance	Record
57	March 1	Sacramento						
58	March 3	Washington						
59	March 6	Utah						
60	March 7	@ Miami	L 105–122				Miami Arena	16–44
61	March 10	@ L.A. Clippers						
62	March 12	@ Seattle						
63	March 13	@ Portland						
64	March 16	Boston						
65	March 18	Cleveland						
66	March 20	@ New York						
67	March 22	Dallas						
68	March 24	Milwaukee						
69	March 28	Miami	L 104–109				Orlando Arena	17–52
70	March 30	@ Washington						

April: 1–11 (home: 0–6; road: 1–5)

Game	Date	Team	Score	High points	High rebounds	High assists	Location Attendance	Record
71	April 1	@ Boston						
72	April 3	Golden State						
73	April 5	@ Chicago						
74	April 6	@ Indiana						
75	April 8	Houston						
76	April 10	Milwaukee						
77	April 13	@ Minnesota	L 102–117				Hubert H. Humphrey Metrodome	17–60
78	April 14	@ Detroit						
79	April 17	Washington						
80	April 18	@ Boston						
81	April 20	Cleveland						
82	April 22	@ New Jersey						

1989–90 schedule

== Player statistics ==
=== Ragular season ===
Player	POS	GP	GS	MP	REB	AST	STL	BLK	PTS	MPG	RPG	APG	SPG	BPG	PPG
Nick Anderson	SG	81	9	1,785	316	124	69	34	931	22.0	3.9	1.5	.9	.4	11.5
Mark Acres	C	80	50	1,691	431	67	36	25	362	21.1	5.4	.8	.5	.3	4.5
Reggie Theus	SG	76	71	2,350	221	407	60	12	1,438	30.9	2.9	5.4	.8	.2	18.9
Terry Catledge	PF	74	72	2,462	563	72	36	17	1,435	33.3	7.6	1.0	.5	.2	19.4
Sidney Green	C	73	31	1,860	588	99	50	26	761	25.5	8.1	1.4	.7	.4	10.4
Michael Ansley	SF	72	5	1,221	362	40	24	17	626	17.0	5.0	.6	.3	.2	8.7
Scott Skiles	PG	70	32	1,460	159	334	36	4	536	20.9	2.3	4.8	.5	.1	7.7
Jerry Reynolds	SF	67	40	1,817	323	180	93	64	858	27.1	4.8	2.7	1.4	1.0	12.8
Otis Smith	SF	65	35	1,644	300	147	76	57	875	25.3	4.6	2.3	1.2	.9	13.5
Sam Vincent	PG	63	45	1,657	194	354	65	20	705	26.3	3.1	5.6	1.0	.3	11.2
Jeff Turner	PF	60	15	1,105	227	53	23	12	308	18.4	3.8	.9	.4	.2	5.1
Morlon Wiley	PG	40	2	638	52	114	45	3	229	16.0	1.3	2.9	1.1	.1	5.7
Dave Corzine	C	6	3	79	18	2	2	0	22	13.2	3.0	.3	.3	.0	3.7
Jawann Oldham^{†}	C	3	0	36	15	0	2	3	4	12.0	5.0	.0	.7	1.0	1.3

- ^{†} Denotes player spent time with another team in the season. Stats reflect time with the Magic only.
