= 1989–90 Philadelphia 76ers season =

NBA professional basketball team season

- Division champions
- Head coach: Jim Lynam
- General manager: John Nash
- Owner: Harold Katz
- Arena: The Spectrum

Results
- Record: 53–29 (.646)
- Place: Division: 1st (Atlantic); Conference: 2nd (Eastern)
- Playoff finish: Conference semifinals (lost to Bulls 1–4)
- Stats at Basketball Reference

Local media
- Television: WPHL-TV; SportsChannel Philadelphia; PRISM
- Radio: WIP

The 1989–90 Philadelphia 76ers season was the 41st season for the Philadelphia 76ers in the National Basketball Association, and their 27th season in Philadelphia, Pennsylvania.

== Season summary ==
=== Off-season ===
During the off-season, the 76ers acquired Rick Mahorn from the Minnesota Timberwolves expansion team, who selected him in the 1989 NBA expansion draft; Mahorn, who won an NBA championship with the Detroit Pistons last year, joined Charles Barkley and Mike Gminski to form a formidable front court. The team also acquired Johnny Dawkins from the San Antonio Spurs, who teamed with second-year star Hersey Hawkins in the backcourt.

=== Regular season ===
With the addition of Mahorn and Dawkins, the 76ers got off to an 18–16 start to the regular season, then posted a 12-game winning streak between January and February, and held a 30–18 record at the All-Star break. The team posted an eight-game winning streak between March and April, and won 13 of their final 16 games of the season. The 76ers finished in first place in the Atlantic Division with a 53–29 record, defeating the Boston Celtics by just one game to win the Atlantic Division title, and earning the second seed in the Eastern Conference; it was their first Division title since their championship season in 1982–83, and their first in the post-Julius Erving era.

Barkley averaged 25.2 points, 11.5 rebounds, 3.9 assists and 1.9 steals per game, shot .600 in field-goal percentage, and was named to the All-NBA First Team, while Hawkins averaged 18.5 points and 1.6 steals per game, and Dawkins provided the team with 14.3 points, 7.4 assists and 1.5 steals per game. In addition, Gminski provided with 13.7 points, 8.5 rebounds and 1.3 blocks per game, while sixth man Ron Anderson contributed 11.9 points per game off the bench, and Mahorn averaged 10.8 points and 7.6 rebounds per game, and was named to the NBA All-Defensive Second Team. Off the bench, Derek Smith contributed 8.9 points per game, and Scott Brooks provided with 4.4 points and 2.9 assists per game.

During the NBA All-Star weekend at the Miami Arena in Miami, Florida, Barkley was selected for the 1990 NBA All-Star Game, as a member of the Eastern Conference All-Star team. Barkley also finished in second place in Most Valuable Player voting, behind Magic Johnson of the Los Angeles Lakers; Barkley received more first-place votes than Johnson, with Barkley receiving 38 out of the 92 votes compared to Johnson's 27, but totaled only 614 points compared to Johnson's 636, as Johnson won the MVP award over Barkley, which drew controversy. This was the only time in NBA history where the player with the most first-place votes for MVP did not get the award. Meanwhile, Hawkins finished in fifth place in Most Improved Player voting, with Smith finishing tied in sixth place, and head coach Jim Lynam finished in second place in Coach of the Year voting, behind Pat Riley of the Lakers.

The 76ers finished 19th in the NBA in home-game attendance, with an attendance of 565,926 at The Spectrum during the regular season.

=== NBA playoffs ===
In the Eastern Conference First Round of the 1990 NBA playoffs, the 76ers faced off against the 7th–seeded Cleveland Cavaliers, a team that featured the All-Star trio of Brad Daugherty, Mark Price and Larry Nance. The 76ers won the first two games over the Cavaliers at home at The Spectrum, before losing the next two games on the road, which included a Game 4 loss to the Cavaliers at the Coliseum at Richfield, 108–96. With the series tied at 2–2, the 76ers won Game 5 over the Cavaliers at The Spectrum, 113–97 to win in a hard-fought five-game series.

In the Eastern Conference Semi-finals, the team faced off against the 3rd–seeded Chicago Bulls, who were led by the trio of All-Star guard Michael Jordan, All-Star forward Scottie Pippen, and Horace Grant. The 76ers lost the first two games to the Bulls on the road at the Chicago Stadium, but managed to win Game 3 at home, 118–112 at The Spectrum. However, the 76ers lost the next two games, including a Game 5 loss to the Bulls at the Chicago Stadium, 117–99, thus losing the series in five games.

=== Aftermath ===
Following the season, Smith signed as a free agent with the Boston Celtics, and Brooks was traded to the Minnesota Timberwolves.

== Draft picks ==
Round	Pick	Player	Position	Nationality	School/Club team
1	19	Kenny Payne	SF	United States	Louisville
2	44	Reggie Cross	PF	United States	Hawaii
2	54	Toney Mack	SG	United States	Georgia

== Roster ==
1989–90 Philadelphia 76ers roster
Players

Pos.	No.	Player	Height	Weight	DOB	From
F	20	Ron Anderson	6 ft 7 in (2.01 m)	215 lb (98 kg)	1958–10–15	Fresno State
F	34	Charles Barkley	6 ft 6 in (1.98 m)	252 lb (114 kg)	1963–02–20	Auburn
G	1	Scott Brooks	5 ft 11 in (1.80 m)	165 lb (75 kg)	1965–07–31	UC Irvine
G	7	Lanard Copeland	6 ft 6 in (1.98 m)	194 lb (88 kg)	1965–07–16	Georgia State
G	12	Johnny Dawkins	6 ft 2 in (1.88 m)	170 lb (77 kg)	1963–09–28	Duke
C	42	Mike Gminski	6 ft 11 in (2.11 m)	250 lb (113 kg)	1959–08–03	Duke
G	33	Hersey Hawkins	6 ft 3 in (1.91 m)	190 lb (86 kg)	1966–09–29	Bradley
F	44	Rick Mahorn	6 ft 10 in (2.08 m)	240 lb (109 kg)	1958–09–21	Hampton
C	40	Kurt Nimphius	6 ft 10 in (2.08 m)	218 lb (99 kg)	1958–03–13	Arizona State
F	18	Kenny Payne	6 ft 8 in (2.03 m)	195 lb (88 kg)	1966–11–25	Louisville
F	21	Derek Smith	6 ft 6 in (1.98 m)	205 lb (93 kg)	1961–11–01	Louisville
F	45	Bob Thornton	6 ft 10 in (2.08 m)	225 lb (102 kg)	1962–07–10	UC Irvine

Coaches
Head coach
- Jim Lynam
Assistant(s)
- Buzz Braman
- Fred Carter

Legend
- (DP) Unsigned draft pick
- (FA) Free agent
- (S) Suspended
- Injured

Roster
Updated: January 15, 1990

== Regular season ==
=== Season standings ===
Atlantic Division	W	L	PCT	GB	Home	Road	Div
y-Philadelphia 76ers	53	29	.646	–	34–7	19–22	19–7
x-Boston Celtics	52	30	.634	1	30–11	22–19	19–7
x-New York Knicks	45	37	.549	8	29–12	16–25	17–9
Washington Bullets	31	51	.378	22	20–21	11–30	10–16
Miami Heat	18	64	.220	35	11–30	7–34	4–22
New Jersey Nets	17	65	.207	36	13–28	4–37	9–17

#	Eastern Conference				
#	Team	W	L	PCT	GB
1	c-Detroit Pistons	59	23	.720	–
2	y-Philadelphia 76ers	53	29	.646	6
3	x-Chicago Bulls	55	27	.671	4
4	x-Boston Celtics	52	30	.634	7
5	x-New York Knicks	45	37	.549	14
6	x-Milwaukee Bucks	44	38	.537	15
7	x-Cleveland Cavaliers	42	40	.512	17
8	x-Indiana Pacers	42	40	.512	17
9	Atlanta Hawks	41	41	.500	18
10	Washington Bullets	31	51	.378	28
11	Miami Heat	18	64	.220	41
12	Orlando Magic	18	64	.220	41
13	New Jersey Nets	17	65	.207	42

z - clinched division title
y - clinched division title
x - clinched playoff spot

=== Game log ===
Reference

== Playoffs ==
1990 playoff game log
First Round: 3–2 (home: 3–0; road: 0–2)

Game	Date	Team	Score	High points	High rebounds	High assists	Location Attendance	Series
1	April 26	Cleveland	W 111–106	Charles Barkley (38)	Charles Barkley (21)	Johnny Dawkins (9)	Spectrum; 15,319	1–0
2	April 29	Cleveland	W 107–101	Charles Barkley (32)	Rick Mahorn (9)	Johnny Dawkins (11)	Spectrum; 18,168	2–0
3	May 1	@ Cleveland	L 95–122	Hersey Hawkins (19)	Charles Barkley (11)	Johnny Dawkins (7)	Richfield Coliseum; 16,317	2–1
4	May 3	@ Cleveland	L 96–108	Charles Barkley (23)	Barkley, Mahorn (11)	Johnny Dawkins (10)	Richfield Coliseum; 17,106	2–2
5	May 5	Cleveland	W 113–97	Hersey Hawkins (39)	Charles Barkley (19)	Johnny Dawkins (14)	Spectrum; 18,168	3–2

Conference semifinals: 1–4 (home: 1–1; road: 0–3)

Game	Date	Team	Score	High points	High rebounds	High assists	Location Attendance	Series
1	May 7	@ Chicago	L 85–96	Charles Barkley (30)	Charles Barkley (20)	three players tied (4)	Chicago Stadium; 18,676	0–1
2	May 9	@ Chicago	L 96–101	Hersey Hawkins (23)	Charles Barkley (19)	Johnny Dawkins (13)	Chicago Stadium; 18,676	0–2
3	May 11	Chicago	W 118–112	Charles Barkley (34)	Charles Barkley (20)	Charles Barkley (8)	Spectrum; 18,168	1–2
4	May 13	Chicago	L 101–111	Hersey Hawkins (26)	Charles Barkley (13)	Hersey Hawkins (6)	Spectrum; 18,168	1–3
5	May 16	@ Chicago	99–117	Ron Anderson (20)	Charles Barkley (13)	Johnny Dawkins (15)	Chicago Stadium; 18,676	1–4

1990 schedule

== Player statistics ==
Legend
GP	Games played	GS	Games started	MPG	Minutes per game
FG%	Field-goal percentage	3P%	3-point field-goal percentage	FT%	Free-throw percentage
RPG	Rebounds per game	APG	Assists per game	SPG	Steals per game
BPG	Blocks per game	PPG	Points per game

=== Regular season ===
Player	GP	GS	MPG	FG%	3P%	FT%	RPG	APG	SPG	BPG	PPG
Ron Anderson	78	3	26.8	.451	.143	.838	3.8	1.8	.9	.2	11.9
Charles Barkley	79	79	39.1	.600	.217	.749	11.5	3.9	1.9	.6	25.2
Scott Brooks	72	1	13.5	.431	.392	.877	.9	2.9	.7	.0	4.4
Lanard Copeland	23	0	4.8	.456	.200	.786	.4	.4	.0	.0	3.2
Johnny Dawkins	81	81	35.4	.489	.333	.861	3.0	7.4	1.5	.1	14.3
Corey Gaines	9	0	9.0	.333	.500	.250	.6	2.9	.4	.0	1.1
Mike Gminski	81	81	32.8	.457	.176	.821	8.5	1.6	.5	1.3	13.7
Hersey Hawkins	82	82	34.8	.460	.420	.888	3.7	3.2	1.6	.3	18.5
Lewis Lloyd^{†}	2	0	5.0	.500			.0	.0	.0	.0	1.0
Rick Mahorn	75	66	30.3	.497	.222	.715	7.6	1.3	.6	1.4	10.8
Kurt Nimphius	38	1	8.3	.418	.000	.467	1.6	.2	.1	.5	2.4
Kenny Payne	35	4	6.2	.435	.400	.889	.7	.3	.2	.2	3.3
Dexter Shouse	3	0	6.0	.000	.000		.0	.7	.3	.3	.0
Derek Smith	75	7	18.7	.508	.444	.699	2.3	1.5	.5	.3	8.9
Bob Thornton	56	0	10.6	.429	.333	.510	2.4	.3	.4	.2	2.2
Jay Vincent^{†}	17	5	15.2	.429	1.000	.892	2.1	.5	.6	.1	7.3

=== Playoffs ===
Player	GP	GS	MPG	FG%	3P%	FT%	RPG	APG	SPG	BPG	PPG
Ron Anderson	10	0	25.6	.430	.600	.967	3.7	1.4	.4	.0	11.2
Charles Barkley	10	10	41.9	.543	.333	.602	15.5	4.3	.8	.7	24.7
Scott Brooks	9	0	11.0	.316	.429	.667	.9	1.8	.3	.0	2.3
Lanard Copeland	4	0	2.3	.333			.3	.0	.0	.0	1.0
Johnny Dawkins	10	10	38.6	.461	.000	.837	2.2	9.3	1.7	.2	14.2
Mike Gminski	10	10	34.2	.487	.000	.933	5.4	1.1	.8	2.3	12.8
Hersey Hawkins	10	10	41.5	.497	.389	.937	3.1	3.6	1.2	.7	23.5
Rick Mahorn	10	10	34.2	.430	.000	.769	7.0	1.0	.7	.8	9.4
Kurt Nimphius	4	0	4.5	.143			1.0	.0	.3	.3	.5
Kenny Payne	3	0	3.3	.400	.000	1.000	.7	.0	.0	.0	2.0
Derek Smith	1	0	15.0	.625	.000	.500	.0	1.0	1.0	.0	11.0
Bob Thornton	9	0	9.9	.389		.500	1.7	.4	.2	.1	2.1

- ^{†} Denotes player spent time with another team in the season. Stats reflect time with the 7ers only.

Player statistics citation:

== Awards and records ==
- Charles Barkley, All-NBA First Team
- Rick Mahorn, NBA All-Defensive Second Team

== See also ==
- 1989–90 NBA season
