= 1989–90 New York Knicks season =

Season of National Basketball Association team the New York Knicks

- Head coach: Stu Jackson
- General manager: Al Bianchi
- Owners: Paramount Communications, Inc.
- Arena: Madison Square Garden

Results
- Record: 45–37 (.549)
- Place: Division: 3rd (Atlantic); Conference: 5th (Eastern)
- Playoff finish: Conference semifinals (lost to Pistons 1–4)
- Stats at Basketball Reference

Local media
- Television: MSG Network (Marv Albert, John Andariese)
- Radio: WFAN (Jim Karvellas, Walt Frazier)

The 1989–90 New York Knicks season was the 44th season for the Knicks in the National Basketball Association. Before the season, owners Gulf+Western reorganized and became Paramount Communications, renaming themselves after the Paramount Pictures film studio.

== Season summary ==
=== Off-season ===
During the off-season, the Knicks hired Stu Jackson as their new head coach; Jackson previously worked as an assistant coach for the Knicks. For the season, the Knicks updated their primary logo, changing the color of the basketball below the team name "Knicks" from brown to orange with blue seams; the logo would remain in use until 1992.

=== Regular season ===
Under Stu Jackson, the Knicks won 9 of their first 13 games of the regular season, posted a nine-game winning streak in December, and later on held a 32–16 record in early February. At mid-season, the team traded second-year guard Rod Strickland to the San Antonio Spurs in exchange for former All-Star guard Maurice Cheeks. However, with a 39–22 record as of March 11, 1990, the Knicks struggled and lost 15 of their final 21 games, which included a six-game losing streak in March. The Knicks finished in third place in the Atlantic Division with a 45–37 record, which earned them the fifth seed in the Eastern Conference, as they qualified for the NBA playoffs for the third consecutive year.

Patrick Ewing averaged 28.6 points, 10.9 rebounds and 4.0 blocks per game, and was named to the All-NBA First Team. In addition, Charles Oakley averaged 14.6 points and 11.9 rebounds per game, while Gerald Wilkins provided the team with 14.5 points and 4.0 assists per game, and Johnny Newman contributed 12.9 points per game. Meanwhile, Kiki Vandeweghe provided the Knicks with 11.7 points per game in only 22 games, and Mark Jackson averaged 9.9 points, 7.4 assists and 1.3 steals per game. Off the bench, three-point specialist Trent Tucker contributed 8.2 points per game, and Kenny Walker averaged 7.9 points and 5.0 rebounds per game.

During the NBA All-Star weekend at the Miami Arena in Miami, Florida, Ewing was selected for the 1990 NBA All-Star Game, as a member of the Eastern Conference All-Star team, while Walker participated in the NBA Slam Dunk Contest for the second consecutive year; Walker won the Slam Dunk Contest the previous year. Ewing finished in fifth place in Most Valuable Player voting, and also finished tied in fifth place in Defensive Player of the Year voting.

The Knicks finished fifth in the NBA in home-game attendance, with an attendance of 730,432 at Madison Square Garden during the regular season.

=== NBA playoffs ===
In the Eastern Conference First Round of the 1990 NBA playoffs, the Knicks faced off against the 4th–seeded Boston Celtics, who were led by the quartet of All-Star forward Larry Bird, All-Star forward Kevin McHale, Reggie Lewis, and All-Star center Robert Parish. The Knicks lost the first two games to the Celtics on the road, including suffering a 157–128 loss in Game 2 at the Boston Garden. However, the Knicks managed to win their next two home games, which included a Game 4 win over the Celtics at Madison Square Garden, 135–108, as Ewing scored 44 points to even the series. The Knicks then won Game 5 over the Celtics at the Boston Garden, 121–114, to win in a hard-fought five-game series.

In the Eastern Conference Semi-finals, the team faced off against the top–seeded and defending NBA champion Detroit Pistons, who won the Central Division title and were led by the All-Star trio of Isiah Thomas, Joe Dumars, and Defensive Player of the Year Dennis Rodman. The Pistons took a 2–0 series lead, but the Knicks managed to win Game 3 at Madison Square Garden, 111–103. However, the Knicks lost the next two games to the Pistons, including a Game 5 road loss at The Palace of Auburn Hills, 95–84, thus losing the series in five games.

The Pistons would advance to the NBA Finals for the third consecutive year, and defeat the Portland Trail Blazers in five games in the 1990 NBA Finals, winning their second consecutive NBA championship.

=== Aftermath ===
Following the season, Newman signed as a free agent with the Charlotte Hornets.

== Draft picks ==
Round	Pick	Player	Position	Nationality	School/Club team
2	50	Brian Quinnett	SF	United States	Washington State

== Roster ==
1989–90 New York Knicks roster
Players

Pos.	No.	Player	Height	Weight	DOB	From
C	54	Greg Butler	6 ft 11 in (2.11 m)	240 lb (109 kg)	1966–03–11	Stanford
G	1	Maurice Cheeks	6 ft 1 in (1.85 m)	180 lb (82 kg)	1956–09–08	West Texas A&M
C	33	Patrick Ewing	7 ft 0 in (2.13 m)	240 lb (109 kg)	1962–08–05	Georgetown
C	40	Stuart Gray	7 ft 0 in (2.13 m)	235 lb (107 kg)	1963–05–27	UCLA
G	13	Mark Jackson	6 ft 1 in (1.85 m)	180 lb (82 kg)	1965–04–01	St. John's
F	4	Johnny Newman	6 ft 7 in (2.01 m)	190 lb (86 kg)	1963–11–28	Richmond
F	34	Charles Oakley	6 ft 8 in (2.03 m)	225 lb (102 kg)	1963–12–18	Virginia Union
G	23	Brian Quinnett	6 ft 8 in (2.03 m)	235 lb (107 kg)	1966–05–30	Washington State
G	6	Trent Tucker	6 ft 5 in (1.96 m)	193 lb (88 kg)	1959–12–20	Minnesota
F	55	Kiki Vandeweghe	6 ft 8 in (2.03 m)	220 lb (100 kg)	1958–08–01	UCLA
F	7	Kenny Walker	6 ft 8 in (2.03 m)	210 lb (95 kg)	1964–08–18	Kentucky
C	45	Eddie Lee Wilkins	6 ft 10 in (2.08 m)	220 lb (100 kg)	1962–05–07	Gardner–Webb
G	21	Gerald Wilkins	6 ft 6 in (1.98 m)	185 lb (84 kg)	1963–09–11	Chattanooga

Coaches
Head coach
- Stu Jackson
Assistant(s)
- Ernie Grunfeld
- Paul Silas
- Jeff Van Gundy

Legend
- (DP) Unsigned draft pick
- (FA) Free agent
- (S) Suspended
- Injured

== Regular season ==
=== Season standings ===
Atlantic Division	W	L	PCT	GB	Home	Road	Div
y-Philadelphia 76ers	53	29	.646	–	34–7	19–22	19–7
x-Boston Celtics	52	30	.634	1	30–11	22–19	19–7
x-New York Knicks	45	37	.549	8	29–12	16–25	17–9
Washington Bullets	31	51	.378	22	20–21	11–30	10–16
Miami Heat	18	64	.220	35	11–30	7–34	4–22
New Jersey Nets	17	65	.207	36	13–28	4–37	9–17

#	Eastern Conference				
#	Team	W	L	PCT	GB
1	c-Detroit Pistons	59	23	.720	–
2	y-Philadelphia 76ers	53	29	.646	6
3	x-Chicago Bulls	55	27	.671	4
4	x-Boston Celtics	52	30	.634	7
5	x-New York Knicks	45	37	.549	14
6	x-Milwaukee Bucks	44	38	.537	15
7	x-Cleveland Cavaliers	42	40	.512	17
8	x-Indiana Pacers	42	40	.512	17
9	Atlanta Hawks	41	41	.500	18
10	Washington Bullets	31	51	.378	28
11	Miami Heat	18	64	.220	41
12	Orlando Magic	18	64	.220	41
13	New Jersey Nets	17	65	.207	42

z – clinched division title
y – clinched division title
x – clinched playoff spot

=== Game log ===
1989–90 game log
Total: 45–37 (home: 29–12; road: 16–25)
November: 9–5 (home: 6–0; road: 3–5)

Game	Date	Team	Score	High points	High rebounds	High assists	Location Attendance	Record
1	November 3; 8:00 p.m. EST	@ Detroit	L 103–106	Ewing (23)	Oakley (11)	Jackson (9)	The Palace of Auburn Hills; 21,454	0–1
6	November 14; 10:30 p.m. EST	@ Portland	L 117–118	Ewing (43)	Oakley (12)	Jackson (7)	Memorial Coliseum; 12,848	3–3

December: 11–2 (home: 6–0; road: 5–2)

Game	Date	Team	Score	High points	High rebounds	High assists	Location Attendance	Record

January: 7–9 (home: 5–2; road: 2–7)

Game	Date	Team	Score	High points	High rebounds	High assists	Location Attendance	Record
30	January 6; 7:30 p.m. EST	@ Detroit	L 106–117	Ewing (29)	Oakley (12)	Jackson (5)	The Palace of Auburn Hills; 21,454	21–9

February: 9–3 (home: 6–1; road: 3–2)

Game	Date	Team	Score	High points	High rebounds	High assists	Location Attendance	Record
54	February 25; 12 Noon EST	Detroit	L 87–98	Ewing (37)	Oakley (14)	Jackson (8)	Madison Square Garden; 18,212	35–19

March: 4–12 (home: 2–7; road: 2–5)

Game	Date	Team	Score	High points	High rebounds	High assists	Location Attendance	Record
58	March 6; 7:30 p.m. EST	Portland	L 100–112	Ewing (40)	Oakley (14)	Ewing, Oakley (5)	Madison Square Garden; 18,212	37–21

April: 5–7 (home: 4–2; road: 1–5)

Game	Date	Team	Score	High points	High rebounds	High assists	Location Attendance	Record
76	April 10; 8:00 p.m. EDT	Detroit	L 98–108	Ewing (26)	Ewing (9)	Cheeks (6)	Madison Square Garden; 18,032	43–33

1989–90 schedule

== Playoffs ==
1990 playoff game log
First Round: 3–2 (home: 2–0; road: 1–2)

Game	Date	Team	Score	High points	High rebounds	High assists	Location Attendance	Series
1	April 26	@ Boston	L 105–116	Patrick Ewing (22)	Patrick Ewing (9)	Maurice Cheeks (9)	Boston Garden; 14,890	0–1
2	April 28	@ Boston	L 128–157	Patrick Ewing (28)	Charles Oakley (9)	Gerald Wilkins (7)	Boston Garden; 14,890	0–2
3	May 2	Boston	W 102–99	Patrick Ewing (33)	Patrick Ewing (19)	Maurice Cheeks (11)	Madison Square Garden; 18,212	1–2
4	May 4	Boston	W 135–108	Patrick Ewing (44)	Patrick Ewing (13)	Maurice Cheeks (12)	Madison Square Garden; 18,212	2–2
5	May 6	@ Boston	W 121–114	Patrick Ewing (31)	Charles Oakley (17)	Patrick Ewing (10)	Boston Garden; 14,890	3–2

Conference semifinals: 1–4 (home: 1–1; road: 0–3)

Game	Date	Team	Score	High points	High rebounds	High assists	Location Attendance	Series
1	May 8; 8:00 p.m. EDT	@ Detroit	L 77–112	Ewing (19)	E Wilkins (8)	Cheeks (6)	The Palace of Auburn Hills; 21,454	0–1
2	May 10; 8:00 p.m. EDT	@ Detroit	L 97–104	G Wilkins (24)	Oakley (15)	Cheeks (8)	The Palace of Auburn Hills; 21,454	0–2
3	May 12; 1:00 p.m. EDT	Detroit	W 111–103	Ewing (45)	Oakley (20)	Cheeks (12)	Madison Square Garden; 18,212	1–2
4	May 13; 3:30 p.m. EDT	Detroit	L 90–102	Ewing (30)	Oakley (14)	Cheeks, Jackson (6)	Madison Square Garden; 18,212	1–3
5	May 15; 8:00 p.m. EDT	@ Detroit	L 84–95	Ewing (22)	Ewing (14)	Cheeks (9)	The Palace of Auburn Hills; 21,454	1–4

1990 schedule

== Player statistics ==
Legend
GP	Games played	GS	Games started	MPG	Minutes per game
FG%	Field-goal percentage	3P%	3-point field-goal percentage	FT%	Free-throw percentage
RPG	Rebounds per game	APG	Assists per game	SPG	Steals per game
BPG	Blocks per game	PPG	Points per game

=== Regular season ===
Player	GP	GS	MPG	FG%	3P%	FT%	RPG	APG	SPG	BPG	PPG
Greg Butler	13	0	2.5	.250		.000	.7	.1	.0	.0	.5
Maurice Cheeks^{†}	31	13	24.3	.579	.429	.877	2.4	4.9	1.4	.2	7.9
Patrick Ewing	82	82	38.6	.551	.250	.775	10.9	2.2	1.0	4.0	28.6
Stuart Gray^{†}	19	0	4.9	.235	.000	.875	.7	.1	.2	.1	.8
Mark Jackson	82	69	29.6	.437	.267	.727	3.9	7.4	1.3	.0	9.9
Pete Myers^{†}	24	0	8.7	.333	.000	.516	1.2	1.5	.6	.1	1.9
Johnny Newman	80	69	28.5	.476	.317	.799	2.4	2.3	1.2	.3	12.9
Charles Oakley	61	61	36.0	.524	.000	.761	11.9	2.4	1.0	.3	14.6
Brian Quinnett	31	0	6.2	.328	.000	.667	.9	.4	.1	.1	1.3
Rod Strickland^{†}	51	0	20.0	.440	.286	.638	2.5	4.3	1.4	.2	8.4
Trent Tucker	81	2	21.3	.417	.388	.767	2.1	2.1	.9	.1	8.2
Kiki VanDeWeghe	22	13	25.6	.442	.526	.917	2.4	1.9	.7	.1	11.7
Kenny Walker	68	21	23.5	.531	.400	.723	5.0	.7	.5	.8	7.9
Eddie Lee Wilkins	79	0	12.3	.455	.000	.605	3.4	.2	.2	.2	4.7
Gerald Wilkins	82	80	31.8	.457	.312	.803	4.5	4.0	1.2	.3	14.5

=== Playoffs ===
Player	GP	GS	MPG	FG%	3P%	FT%	RPG	APG	SPG	BPG	PPG
Maurice Cheeks	10	10	38.8	.481	.000	.903	3.9	8.5	1.7	.2	12.8
Patrick Ewing	10	10	39.5	.521	.500	.823	10.5	3.1	1.3	2.0	29.4
Stuart Gray	4	0	3.0	.400			2.0	.0	.3	.0	1.0
Mark Jackson	9	0	9.0	.419	.000	.727	.6	2.3	.2	.0	3.8
Johnny Newman	10	0	23.1	.447	.400	.755	2.1	1.0	.9	.3	11.7
Charles Oakley	10	8	33.6	.512	1.000	.654	11.0	2.7	1.1	.2	12.1
Brian Quinnett	3	0	5.3	.500	1.000		2.7	.7	.0	.0	1.7
Trent Tucker	10	0	17.8	.400	.370	1.000	1.4	2.0	1.0	.0	6.0
Kiki VanDeWeghe	10	10	23.6	.419	.462	.800	1.2	1.4	.5	.2	7.6
Kenny Walker	10	2	15.4	.552	.000	.643	2.5	.6	.0	.4	4.1
Eddie Lee Wilkins	7	0	7.7	.500		.545	1.6	.0	.3	.0	3.4
Gerald Wilkins	10	10	31.9	.460	.250	.818	3.6	5.2	1.4	.1	14.6

- ^{†} Denotes player spent time with another team in the season. Stats reflect time with the Knicks only.

== Awards and records ==
- Patrick Ewing, All-NBA First Team
