= 1989–90 Cleveland Cavaliers season =

NBA professional basketball team season

- Head coach: Lenny Wilkens
- General manager: Wayne Embry
- Owners: Gordon Gund; George Gund III
- Arena: Richfield Coliseum

Results
- Record: 42–40 (.512)
- Place: Division: 4th (Central); Conference: 7th (Eastern)
- Playoff finish: First round (lost to 76ers 2–3)
- Stats at Basketball Reference

Local media
- Television: WOIO; SportsChannel Ohio
- Radio: WRMR

The 1989–90 Cleveland Cavaliers season was the 20th season for the Cleveland Cavaliers in the National Basketball Association.

== Season summary ==
=== Off-season ===
During the off-season, the Cavaliers acquired second-year guard Steve Kerr from the Phoenix Suns. All-Star center Brad Daugherty was out for the first half of the regular season due to foot surgery, and only appeared in just 41 games.

For the season, the team slightly updated their road uniforms, replacing the team nickname "Cavs" with the city name "Cleveland" on the front of their jerseys; these uniforms would remain in use until 1994.

=== Regular season ===
Without Daugherty, the Cavaliers got off to a slow start losing their first four games, on their way to a mediocre 10–16 start to the regular season. Early into the season, the team traded Ron Harper to the Los Angeles Clippers in exchange for rookie power forward, and first-round draft pick Danny Ferry and Reggie Williams; Ferry was selected by the Clippers out of Duke University as the second overall pick in the 1989 NBA draft, but refused to play for them as he went to play overseas in Italy. At mid-season, the team traded Chris Dudley to the New Jersey Nets, and released Williams to free agency; Williams later on signed with the San Antonio Spurs. The Cavaliers struggled playing below .500 in winning percentage for the first half of the season, holding a 21–25 record at the All-Star break, but played above .500 for the remainder of the season, winning 10 of their final 13 games, included a six-game winning streak to close the season. The Cavaliers finished in fourth place in the Central Division with a mediocre 42–40 record, and earned the seventh seed in the Eastern Conference.

Mark Price averaged 19.6 points, 9.1 assists and 1.6 steals per game, and led the Cavaliers with 152 three-point field goals, while Daugherty averaged 16.8 points and 9.1 rebounds per game, and Larry Nance provided the team with 16.3 points, 8.3 rebounds and 2.0 blocks per game. In addition, sixth man Hot Rod Williams provided with 16.8 points, 8.1 rebounds and 2.0 blocks per game, while Craig Ehlo contributed 13.6 points, 5.4 rebounds, 4.6 assists and 1.6 steals per game, along with 104 three-point field goals. Meanwhile, rookie small forward, and second-round draft pick Chucky Brown averaged 7.3 points per game, Kerr contributed 6.7 points and 3.2 assists per game, and shot .507 in three-point field-goal percentage, and Winston Bennett provided with 6.1 points and 3.4 rebounds per game.

During the NBA All-Star weekend at the Miami Arena in Miami, Florida, Price and Ehlo both participated in the NBA Three-Point Shootout. Despite a stellar season, Price was not selected for the 1990 NBA All-Star Game. Hot Rod Williams finished tied in third place in Sixth Man of the Year voting. The Cavaliers finished eighth in the NBA in home-game attendance, with an attendance of 695,710 at the Coliseum at Richfield during the regular season.

=== NBA playoffs ===
In the Eastern Conference First Round of the 1990 NBA playoffs, the Cavaliers faced off against the 2nd–seeded, and Atlantic Division champion Philadelphia 76ers, who were led by All-Star forward Charles Barkley, second-year star Hersey Hawkins, and Johnny Dawkins. The Cavaliers lost the first two games to the 76ers on the road at The Spectrum, but managed to win the next two games at home, which included a Game 4 win over the 76ers at the Coliseum at Richfield, 108–96 to even the series. However, the Cavaliers lost Game 5 to the 76ers at The Spectrum, 113–97, thus losing in a hard-fought five-game series.

=== Aftermath ===
The team's season roster is featured in the video games NBA 2K16, and NBA 2K17.

== Draft picks ==
Round	Pick	Player	Position	Nationality	School/Club team
1	25	John Morton	Guard	United States	Seton Hall
2	43	Chucky Brown	Forward	United States	NC State

== Roster ==
1989–90 Cleveland Cavaliers roster
Players

Pos.	No.	Player	Height	Weight	DOB	From
F	20	Winston Bennett	6 ft 7 in (2.01 m)	210 lb (95 kg)	1965–02–09	Kentucky
F	52	Chucky Brown	6 ft 7 in (2.01 m)	214 lb (97 kg)	1968–02–29	NC State
F	33	Derrick Chievous	6 ft 7 in (2.01 m)	195 lb (88 kg)	1967–07–03	Missouri
C	43	Brad Daugherty	7 ft 0 in (2.13 m)	245 lb (111 kg)	1965–10–19	North Carolina
G	3	Craig Ehlo	6 ft 6 in (1.98 m)	180 lb (82 kg)	1961–08–11	Washington State
G	5	Steve Kerr	6 ft 3 in (1.91 m)	170 lb (77 kg)	1965–09–27	Arizona
C	44	Paul Mokeski	7 ft 0 in (2.13 m)	250 lb (113 kg)	1957–01–03	Kansas
G	23	John Morton	6 ft 3 in (1.91 m)	180 lb (82 kg)	1967–05–18	Seton Hall
F	22	Larry Nance	6 ft 10 in (2.08 m)	205 lb (93 kg)	1959–02–12	Clemson
G	25	Mark Price	6 ft 0 in (1.83 m)	170 lb (77 kg)	1964–02–15	Georgia Tech
C	30	Tree Rollins	7 ft 1 in (2.16 m)	235 lb (107 kg)	1955–06–16	Clemson
F/C	18	Hot Rod Williams	6 ft 11 in (2.11 m)	215 lb (98 kg)	1962–08–09	Tulane

Coaches
Head coach
- Lenny Wilkens
Assistant(s)
- Dick Helm
- Brian Winters

Legend
- (DP) Unsigned draft pick
- (FA) Free agent
- (S) Suspended
- Injured

Roster
Updated: February 26, 1990

== Regular season ==
=== Season standings ===
Central Division	W	L	PCT	GB	Home	Road	Div
y-Detroit Pistons	59	23	.720	–	35–6	24–17	22–8
x-Chicago Bulls	55	27	.671	4	36–5	19–22	20–10
x-Milwaukee Bucks	44	38	.537	15	27–14	17–24	14–16
x-Cleveland Cavaliers	42	40	.512	17	27–14	15–26	14–16
x-Indiana Pacers	42	40	.512	17	28–13	14–27	16–14
Atlanta Hawks	41	41	.500	18	25–16	16–25	15–15
Orlando Magic	18	64	.220	41	12–29	6–35	4–26

#	Eastern Conference				
#	Team	W	L	PCT	GB
1	c-Detroit Pistons	59	23	.720	–
2	y-Philadelphia 76ers	53	29	.646	6
3	x-Chicago Bulls	55	27	.671	4
4	x-Boston Celtics	52	30	.634	7
5	x-New York Knicks	45	37	.549	14
6	x-Milwaukee Bucks	44	38	.537	15
7	x-Cleveland Cavaliers	42	40	.512	17
8	x-Indiana Pacers	42	40	.512	17
9	Atlanta Hawks	41	41	.500	18
10	Washington Bullets	31	51	.378	28
11	Miami Heat	18	64	.220	41
12	Orlando Magic	18	64	.220	41
13	New Jersey Nets	17	65	.207	42

Notes

- z, y – division champions
- x – clinched playoff spot

== Game log ==
1989–90 game log
Total: 42–40 (home: 27–14; road: 15–26)
November: 6–7 (home: 5–2; road: 1–5)

Game	Date	Team	Score	High points	High rebounds	High assists	Location Attendance	Record
1	November 3, 1989	@ Chicago						
2	November 4, 1989	@ Indiana						
3	November 8, 1989	Orlando						
4	November 10, 1989	@ Washington (at Baltimore, MD)						
5	November 11, 1989	Boston						
6	November 14, 1989	@ New Jersey						
7	November 15, 1989	Golden State						
8	November 17, 1989; 8:00 pm EST	Atlanta	W 131–125 (OT)	Ehlo (31)	Williams (14)	Price (10)	Richfield Coliseum; 16,135	4–4
9	November 22, 1989	New York						
10	November 24, 1989	@ Detroit						
11	November 25, 1989	Houston						
12	November 28, 1989	Washington						
13	November 29, 1989	@ Philadelphia						

December: 5–9 (home: 3–4; road: 2–5)

Game	Date	Team	Score	High points	High rebounds	High assists	Location Attendance	Record
14	December 1, 1989	@ Boston						
15	December 2, 1989	Minnesota						
16	December 5, 1989	Utah						
17	December 7, 1989	@ L.A. Clippers						
18	December 9, 1989	@ Sacramento						
19	December 11, 1989	@ Utah						
20	December 13, 1989	Milwaukee						
21	December 15, 1989	Seattle						
22	December 20, 1989	Denver						
23	December 22, 1989	@ Milwaukee						
24	December 25, 1989; 3:30 pm EST	@ Atlanta	L 104–115	Williams, Williams (17)	Ehlo, Nance (8)	Price (11)	The Omni; 13,357	10–14
25	December 27, 1989	Detroit						
26	December 28, 1989	@ Charlotte						
27	December 30, 1989	Phoenix						

January: 8–7 (home: 3–3; road: 5–4)

Game	Date	Team	Score	High points	High rebounds	High assists	Location Attendance	Record
28	January 3, 1990	Chicago						
29	January 5, 1990	Washington						
30	January 6, 1990	@ Orlando						
31	January 10, 1990	Milwaukee						
32	January 12, 1990	@ Philadelphia						
33	January 13, 1990	New Jersey						
34	January 15, 1990	San Antonio						
35	January 17, 1990	@ Houston						
36	January 19, 1990	@ San Antonio						
37	January 20, 1990	@ Dallas						
38	January 23, 1990	Philadelphia						
39	January 24, 1990; 7:30 pm EST	@ Atlanta	L 86–103	Price (20)	Keys, Nance (6)	Price (7)	The Omni; 14,220	16–23
40	January 26, 1990	@ Minnesota						
41	January 27, 1990	@ Indiana						
42	January 30, 1990	@ Miami						

February: 6–6 (home: 6–3; road: 0–3)

Game	Date	Team	Score	High points	High rebounds	High assists	Location Attendance	Record
43	February 3, 1990	Detroit						
44	February 5, 1990	L.A. Clippers						
45	February 6, 1990	@ Detroit						
46	February 8, 1990	Miami						
All-Star Break
47	February 14, 1990	Indiana						
48	February 16, 1990; 8:00 pm EST	Atlanta	W 109–101	Nance (30)	Daugherty (14)	Price (9)	Richfield Coliseum; 18,988	22–26
49	February 17, 1990	@ New York						
50	February 19, 1990	Dallas						
51	February 21, 1990	Portland						
52	February 23, 1990	Orlando						
53	February 25, 1990	Charlotte						
54	February 27, 1990	@ Portland						

March: 8–8 (home: 5–1; road: 3–7)

Game	Date	Team	Score	High points	High rebounds	High assists	Location Attendance	Record
55	March 1, 1990	@ Denver						
56	March 2, 1990	@ L.A. Lakers						
57	March 4, 1990	@ Phoenix						
58	March 6, 1990	@ Seattle						
59	March 8, 1990	@ Golden State						
60	March 11, 1990	@ Milwaukee						
61	March 13, 1990	Philadelphia						
62	March 15, 1990	L.A. Lakers						
63	March 17, 1990	Indiana						
64	March 18, 1990	@ Orlando						
65	March 21, 1990	@ Boston						
66	March 23, 1990	@ Chicago						
67	March 24, 1990	New Jersey						
68	March 26, 1990	Sacramento						
69	March 28, 1990	Chicago						
70	March 30, 1990	@ Miami						

April: 9–3 (home: 5–1; road: 4–2)

Game	Date	Team	Score	High points	High rebounds	High assists	Location Attendance	Record
71	April 1, 1990	Indiana						
72	April 3, 1990	@ New York						
73	April 4, 1990; 7:30 pm EDT	Atlanta	W 101–95	Daugherty (24)	Daugherty (13)	Price (20)	Richfield Coliseum; 18,074	35–38
74	April 6, 1990	Boston						
75	April 8, 1990	Detroit						
76	April 11, 1990	@ Chicago						
77	April 12, 1990	@ Washington						
78	April 14, 1990	Miami						
79	April 17, 1990	@ Milwaukee						
80	April 18, 1990	@ New Jersey						
81	April 20, 1990	@ Orlando						
82	April 22, 1990	New York						

1989–90 schedule

== Playoffs ==
1990 playoff game log
Eastern Conference First Round: 2–3 (home: 2–0; road: 0–3)

Game	Date	Team	Score	High points	High rebounds	High assists	Location Attendance	Series
1	April 28	@ Philadelphia	L 106–111	Hot Rod Williams (23)	Hot Rod Williams (10)	Mark Price (12)	Spectrum; 15,319	0–1
2	May 1	@ Philadelphia	L 101–107	Mark Price (27)	Brad Daugherty (13)	Craig Ehlo (8)	Spectrum; 18,168	0–2
3	May 3	Philadelphia	W 122–95	Craig Ehlo (25)	Ehlo, Daugherty (10)	Ehlo, Daugherty (9)	Richfield Coliseum; 16,317	1–2
4	May 5	Philadelphia	W 108–96	Brad Daugherty (34)	Brad Daugherty (9)	Mark Price (18)	Richfield Coliseum; 17,106	2–2
5	May 8	@ Philadelphia	L 97–113	Brad Daugherty (25)	Hot Rod Williams (13)	Craig Ehlo (5)	Spectrum; 18,168	2–3

1990 schedule

== Player stats ==
Legend
GP	Games played	GS	Games started	MPG	Minutes per game
FG%	Field-goal percentage	3P%	3-point field-goal percentage	FT%	Free-throw percentage
RPG	Rebounds per game	APG	Assists per game	SPG	Steals per game
BPG	Blocks per game	PPG	Points per game

=== Season ===
Player	GP	GS	MPG	FG%	3P%	FT%	RPG	APG	SPG	BPG	PPG
Ron Harper	7	7	37.4	44.2	20.0	75.6	6.9	7.0	2.0	1.3	22.0
Mark Price	73	73	37.1	45.9	40.6	88.8	3.4	9.1	1.6	0.1	19.6
Brad Daugherty	41	40	35.1	47.9	0.0	70.4	9.1	3.2	0.7	0.5	16.8
Hot Rod Williams	82	29	33.9	49.3	0.0	73.9	8.1	2.0	1.0	2.0	16.8
Larry Nance	62	53	33.3	51.1	100.0	77.8	8.3	2.6	0.9	2.0	16.3
Craig Ehlo	81	64	35.7	46.4	41.9	68.1	5.4	4.6	1.6	0.3	13.6
Randolph Keys	48	13	18.6	42.1	20.0	74.4	2.9	0.8	0.8	0.0	7.6
Chucky Brown	75	35	17.9	47.0	0.0	76.2	3.1	0.7	0.4	0.3	7.3
Reggie Williams	32	12	16.9	38.1	22.2	73.2	1.9	1.2	0.7	0.3	6.8
Steve Kerr	78	5	21.3	44.4	50.7	86.3	1.3	3.2	0.6	0.1	6.7
Winston Bennett	55	34	18.0	47.9	0.0	66.7	3.4	1.0	0.4	0.2	6.1
Chris Dudley	37	22	18.5	38.9	0.0	33.8	5.5	0.5	0.5	1.1	5.0
Paul Mokeski	38	1	11.8	42.0	0.0	69.4	2.6	0.4	0.2	0.3	4.0
John Morton	37	3	10.9	29.8	23.3	69.4	0.9	1.8	0.5	0.1	3.9
Derrick Chievous	14	0	7.1	35.7	0.0	79.2	1.1	0.3	0.2	0.1	3.5
Tree Rollins	48	19	14.0	45.6	0.0	68.8	3.2	0.5	0.3	1.1	2.6
Gary Voce	1	0	4.0	33.3	0.0	0.0	2.0	0.0	0.0	0.0	2.0

=== Playoffs ===
Player	GP	GS	MPG	FG%	3P%	FT%	RPG	APG	SPG	BPG	PPG
Brad Daugherty	5	5	37.2	58.6	0.0	69.6	9.6	4.0	0.4	0.8	22.8
Mark Price	5	5	38.4	52.5	35.3	100.0	2.8	8.8	1.8	0.2	20.0
Hot Rod Williams	5	0	34.8	55.7	0.0	77.3	9.2	2.2	0.4	1.0	19.0
Craig Ehlo	5	5	39.2	41.9	33.3	63.2	6.4	6.4	1.2	0.0	13.8
Larry Nance	5	5	31.8	57.8	0.0	75.0	4.8	2.4	0.6	2.0	12.2
Winston Bennett	5	5	27.0	48.9	0.0	66.7	4.2	1.0	0.6	0.2	10.0
Derrick Chievous	3	0	9.3	60.0	0.0	77.8	1.0	0.7	0.3	0.0	6.3
John Morton	2	0	4.5	40.0	0.0	100.0	0.0	0.0	0.0	0.0	3.0
Tree Rollins	3	0	12.7	33.3	0.0	75.0	2.7	0.3	0.7	0.3	2.7
Steve Kerr	5	0	14.6	28.6	0.0	0.0	1.2	2.0	0.8	0.0	1.6
Paul Mokeski	3	0	3.3	50.0	0.0	100.0	0.7	0.0	0.3	0.3	1.3

Player statistics citation:
