= Dennis Hopson =

American basketball player & coach (born 1965)

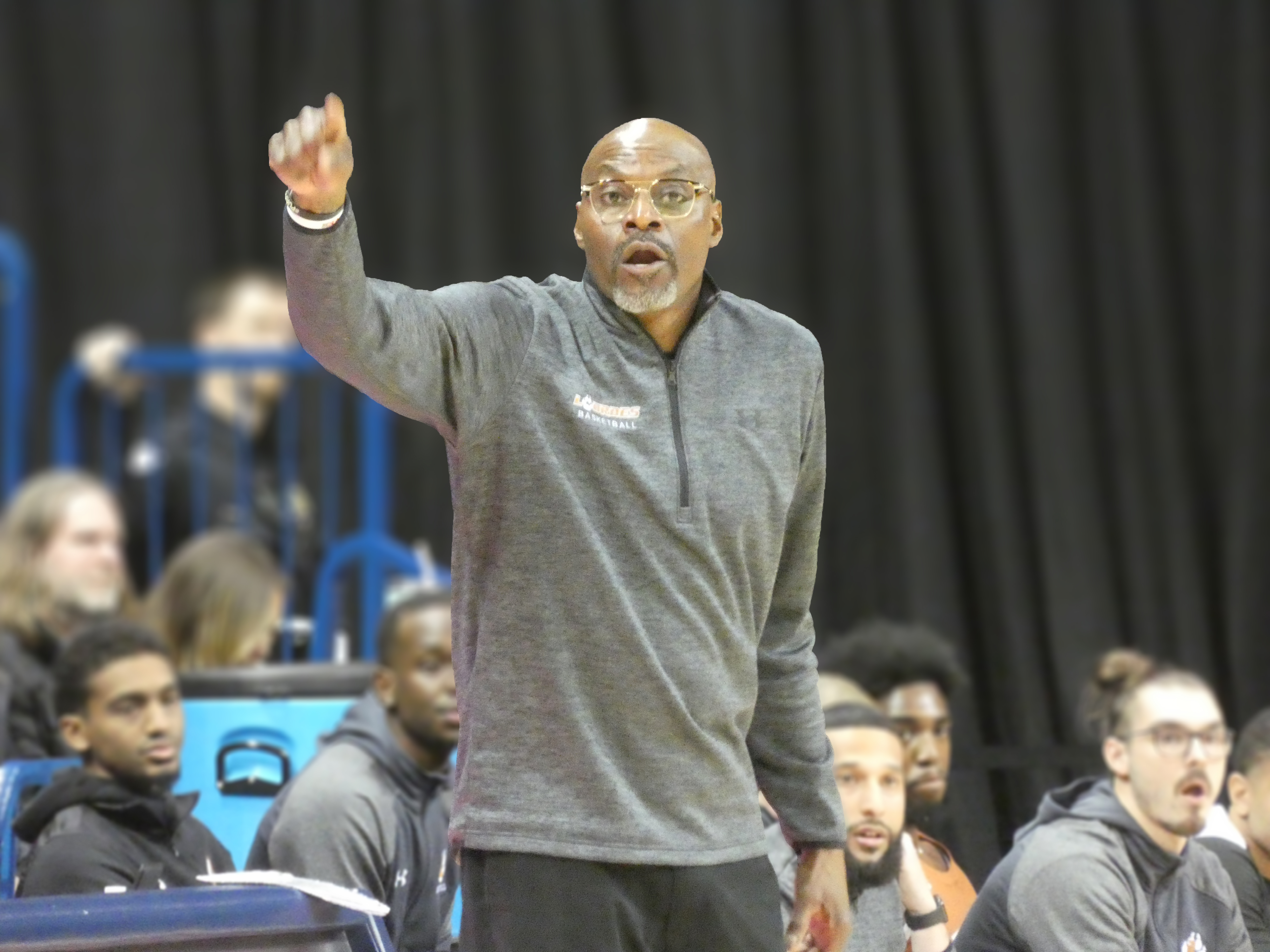
- Hopson as head coach for Lourdes in 2022

Personal information
- Born: April 22, 1965 (age 61) Toledo, Ohio, U.S.
- Listed height: 6 ft 5 in (1.96 m)
- Listed weight: 200 lb (91 kg)

Career information
- High school: E.L. Bowsher (Toledo, Ohio)
- College: The Ohio State (1983–1987)
- NBA draft: 1987: 1st round, 3rd overall pick
- Drafted by: New Jersey Nets
- Playing career: 1987–2000
- Position: Small forward / shooting guard
- Number: 23, 2, 20
- Coaching career: 2007–present

Career history

Playing
- 1987–1990: New Jersey Nets
- 1990–1991: Chicago Bulls
- 1991–1992: Sacramento Kings
- 1992–1994: Natwest Zaragoza
- 1994–1995: Cholet Cedex Basket
- 1995–1996: Le Mans
- 1996: Purefoods Carne Norte
- 1996–1997: Galatasaray
- 1997: Hapoel Eilat
- 1997–1998: Maccabi Rishon LeZion
- 1998–1999: Maccabi Giv'at Shmuel
- 1999: Gaiteros del Zulia
- 1999–2000: Maccabi Kiryat Motzkin
- 2000: Maccabi Giv'at Shmuel

Coaching
- 2007–2009: Northwood (assistant)
- 2009–2014: Bowling Green (assistant)
- 2014–2015: Bedford HS
- 2019–2024: Lourdes
- 2026–present: Florida Polytechnic

Career highlights
- NBA champion (1991); Consensus second-team All-American (1987); Big Ten Player of the Year (1987); First-team All-Big Ten (1987)

Career NBA statistics
- Points: 3,633 (10.9 PPG)
- Assists: 539 (1.6 APG)
- Steals: 319 (1.0 SPG)
- Stats at NBA.com
- Stats at Basketball Reference

Dennis Hopson (born April 22, 1965) is an American basketball coach and former professional player. A prolific scorer while playing at The Ohio State University, Hopson's stellar shooting skills placed him second for the NCAA Men's Basketball Division I scoring title during the 1986–87 season and eventually first on The Ohio State's all-time men's basketball career points record. The All-American and 1987 Big Ten Conference Player of the Year was selected as the third overall pick in the 1987 NBA draft by the New Jersey Nets, playing a total of five seasons in the league. Hopson spent the majority of the 1990s playing basketball overseas before retiring at the close of the decade.

== College career ==
A six-foot five-inch (1.96 m) shooting guard and small forward, Dennis Hopson was a standout at Toledo's Bowsher High School before enrolling at Ohio State University. He began his collegiate basketball career with The Ohio State Buckeyes on a quiet note, averaging 5.3 points per game as a freshman and 9.8 points per game during his sophomore campaign. Hopson began to blossom during his junior year when he more than doubled his scoring average to 20.9 points per game. The star Buckeye swingman entered a new phase in his game when the school installed Gary Williams as their new head coach in 1986. Williams implemented a quicker offensive tempo that complimented Hopson's preference for a running game, which subsequently allowed Hopson to further increase his production on offense. Hopson's gifted jump shot and extraordinary scoring abilities off the dribble and in the open court placed him as the second leading scorer in Division I during the 1986–87 season and earned him the 1987 Big Ten Player of the Year award. He was also considered an all-around athlete as a senior: His point guard-like passing touch helped him record 3.6 assists per game (second best on the team) and despite his size Hopson nonetheless lead the Buckeyes in rebounds, averaging 8.2 per game during his final season. He completed his tenure at The Ohio State with All-American honors and became the school's all-time leader in points and steals (Jay Burson would later break the school's steals record in 1989, while Bruce Thornton would go on to break the school’s points records in 2026).

== NBA career ==
Hopson was the third overall selection in the 1987 NBA Draft by the New Jersey Nets. New Jersey's performance wilted earlier in the season when its formerly solid backcourt became plagued with injuries and contract disputes. Looking to re-establish a stable backcourt for the upcoming 1987–88 season, the Nets selected Dennis Hopson along with five other guards in the 1987 draft. Hopson was unable to live up to the organization's expectations after three seasons in New Jersey, even though he led the team in points in 1989–90. He also played briefly for the Chicago Bulls and the Sacramento Kings, winning a championship with the Bulls in 1990–91 even though he had very little playing time in either the 2nd half of the season or the playoffs. His last NBA game was in the 1991–92 season.

== Overseas career ==
Hopson ventured overseas after departing from the NBA in 1992, stopping first in the Spanish Liga ACB before heading north to France two years later. Hopson went from crossing countries to crossing continents when he joined the Philippine Basketball Association in 1996, though his stay in the league was cut short by an injury. He resurfaced later in the year with the Turkish Basketball League's Galatasaray club roster for the 1996–97 season and departed mid-season.

He signed with the Hapoel Eilat basketball club of the Israeli Basketball Super League. The following season Hopson reunited with former college teammate Brad Sellers as members of Israel's Maccabi Rishon Lezion basketball club. Hopson played well with LeZion that season and was considered one of the league's top players. The seasoned globetrotter was called up to briefly play for the Venezuelan Professional Basketball League's Gaiteros del Zulia club in 1999 and retired a year later, playing out the remainder of his professional career for Maccabi Giv'at Shmuel and Maccabi Kiryat Motzkin back in Israel.

== Coaching career ==
Hopson retired from basketball in 2000 and returned to his home state to run a trucking and recruiting company in Columbus, Ohio. However it wasn't long before Hopson returned to the game, assuming the duties as head coach of the ABA's Toledo Royal Knights until the team folded in December 2006. Several years later he resettled in Florida to accept an assistant coaching position at Northwood University in West Palm Beach, Florida, where he served under head coach Rollie Massimino. In September 2009, he became an assistant basketball coach at Bowling Green State University. He was let go when Louis Orr was not retained as head coach in 2014. In 2014, Hopson received the head coaching job at Bedford High School in Temperance, Michigan and resigned after one season. On May 2, 2019, Hopson was announced as the head coach of the Lourdes Gray Wolves men's basketball team. Hopson then led the Gray Wolves to a conference tournament championship in the 2021–2022 season. On August 13, 2024, it was announced that Hopson had resigned his heading coaching job for the Gray Wolves. He then served as the athletic director for Bowsher High School after departing from Lourdes. On June 16, 2026, he accepted a head coaching job for Florida Polytechnic.

== Career statistics ==
Legend
GP	Games played	GS	Games started	MPG	Minutes per game
FG%	Field goal percentage	3P%	3-point field goal percentage	FT%	Free throw percentage
RPG	Rebounds per game	APG	Assists per game	SPG	Steals per game
BPG	Blocks per game	PPG	Points per game	**Bold**	Career high
†	Won an NBA championship

=== NBA ===
==== Regular season ====
Year	Team	GP	GS	MPG	FG%	3P%	FT%	RPG	APG	SPG	BPG	PPG
1987–88	New Jersey	61	19	22.4	.404	.267	.740	2.3	**1.9**	.9	.4	9.6
1988–89	New Jersey	62	36	25.0	.419	.148	**.849**	3.3	1.7	1.1	.5	12.7
1989–90	New Jersey	**79**	**64**	**32.3**	.434	**.317**	.792	**3.5**	**1.9**	**1.3**	**.6**	**15.8**
1990–91†	Chicago	61	0	11.9	.426	.200	.663	1.8	1.1	.4	.2	4.3
1991–92	Chicago	2	0	5.0	**.500**	–	–	.0	.0	.5	.0	1.0
1991–92	Sacramento	69	0	18.9	.465	.255	.708	3.0	1.5	1.0	**.6**	10.7
Career		334	119	22.5	.431	.271	.765	2.8	1.6	1.0	.5	10.9

==== Playoffs ====
Year	Team	GP	GS	MPG	FG%	3P%	FT%	RPG	APG	SPG	BPG	PPG
1991†	Chicago	5	0	3.6	.333	–	.444	.8	.2	.0	.2	1.6
