= 1989–90 New Jersey Nets season =

NBA professional basketball team season

- Head coach: Bill Fitch
- Arena: Brendan Byrne Arena

Results
- Record: 17–65 (.207)
- Place: Division: 6th (Atlantic); Conference: 13th (Eastern)
- Playoff finish: Did not qualify
- Stats at Basketball Reference

Local media
- Television: WWOR-TV; SportsChannel New York
- Radio: WNEW

The 1989–90 New Jersey Nets season was the Nets' 23rd season in the National Basketball Association, and 14th season in East Rutherford, New Jersey.

== Season summary ==
=== Off-season ===
The Nets received the twelfth overall pick in the 1989 NBA draft, and selected point guard Mookie Blaylock from the University of Oklahoma. During the off-season, the team acquired Sam Bowie from the Portland Trail Blazers on draft day, signed free agent Purvis Short, and hired Bill Fitch as their new head coach. In December, the Nets signed free agent Jack Haley.

=== Regular season ===
Under Fitch and with the addition of Bowie, Short and Blaylock, the Nets got off to a 3–2 start to the regular season, but then posted a nine-game losing streak afterwards. The team continued to struggle posting a 14-game losing streak between January and February, and holding a 12–35 record at the All-Star break. At mid-season, the team traded Joe Barry Carroll to the Denver Nuggets, acquired Chris Dudley from the Cleveland Cavaliers, and signed free agent, and undrafted rookie power forward Derrick Gervin. The Nets posted an 11-game losing streak in March, and lost their final seven games of the season, finishing in last place in the Atlantic Division with a league-worst 17–65 record.

Dennis Hopson averaged 15.8 points and 1.3 steals per game, while Roy Hinson averaged 15.0 points and 6.9 rebounds per game, but only played just 25 games due to injury, and second-year star Chris Morris provided the team with 14.8 points, 5.3 rebounds and 1.6 steals per game. In addition, Bowie provided with 14.7 points, 10.1 rebounds and 1.8 blocks per game, but only shot .416 in field-goal percentage, while Short contributed 13.1 points per game, Gervin averaged 12.0 points and 3.1 rebounds per game in 21 games, and Blaylock contributed 10.1 points, 4.2 assists and 1.6 steals per game, but only appeared in just 50 games also due to injury. Meanwhile, second-year center Charles Shackleford averaged 8.2 points and 6.8 rebounds per game, Lester Conner provided with 7.9 points, 4.7 assists and 2.1 steals per game, Dudley contributed 6.1 points and 8.1 rebounds per game in 27 games after the trade, and Haley averaged 6.0 points and 5.0 rebounds per game.

The Nets finished 25th in the NBA in home-game attendance, with an attendance of 473,760 at the Brendan Byrne Arena during the regular season, which was the third-lowest in the league.

=== Aftermath ===
Following the season, Hopson was traded to the Chicago Bulls, and Short retired.

== Draft picks ==
Round	Pick	Player	Position	Nationality	College
1	12	Mookie Blaylock	PG	United States	Oklahoma
2	32	Stanley Brundy	F	United States	DePaul

== Roster ==
1989–90 New Jersey Nets roster
Players

Pos.	No.	Player	Height	Weight	DOB	From
G	10	Mookie Blaylock	6 ft 0 in (1.83 m)	180 lb (82 kg)	1967-03-20	Oklahoma
C	31	Sam Bowie	7 ft 1 in (2.16 m)	235 lb (107 kg)	1961-03-17	Kentucky
F	21	Stanley Brundy	6 ft 6 in (1.98 m)	210 lb (95 kg)	1967-11-13	DePaul
G	15	Lester Conner	6 ft 4 in (1.93 m)	180 lb (82 kg)	1959-09-17	Oregon State
C	22	Chris Dudley	6 ft 11 in (2.11 m)	235 lb (107 kg)	1965-02-22	Yale
F	24	Derrick Gervin	6 ft 8 in (2.03 m)	200 lb (91 kg)	1963-03-28	Texas–San Antonio
F/C	44	Jack Haley	6 ft 10 in (2.08 m)	240 lb (109 kg)	1964-01-27	UCLA
F	23	Roy Hinson (injured)	6 ft 9 in (2.06 m)	210 lb (95 kg)	1961-05-02	Rutgers
G/F	2	Dennis Hopson	6 ft 5 in (1.96 m)	200 lb (91 kg)	1965-04-22	Ohio State
F/C	42	Anthony Mason	6 ft 7 in (2.01 m)	250 lb (113 kg)	1966-12-14	Tennessee State
G/F	34	Chris Morris	6 ft 8 in (2.03 m)	210 lb (95 kg)	1966-01-20	Auburn
G	7	Pete Myers	6 ft 6 in (1.98 m)	180 lb (82 kg)	1963-09-15	Little Rock
F/C	33	Charles Shackleford	6 ft 10 in (2.08 m)	225 lb (102 kg)	1966-04-22	NC State
G/F	45	Purvis Short	6 ft 7 in (2.01 m)	210 lb (95 kg)	1957-07-02	Jackson State
G	5	Leon Wood	6 ft 3 in (1.91 m)	185 lb (84 kg)	1962-03-25	Cal State Fullerton

Coaches
Head coach
- Bill Fitch
Assistant(s)
- Butch Beard
- Rick Carlisle

Legend
- (DP) Unsigned draft pick
- (FA) Free agent
- (S) Suspended
- Injured

Roster

== Regular season ==
=== Season standings ===
Atlantic Division	W	L	PCT	GB	Home	Road	Div
y-Philadelphia 76ers	53	29	.646	–	34–7	19–22	19–7
x-Boston Celtics	52	30	.634	1	30–11	22–19	19–7
x-New York Knicks	45	37	.549	8	29–12	16–25	17–9
Washington Bullets	31	51	.378	22	20–21	11–30	10–16
Miami Heat	18	64	.220	35	11–30	7–34	4–22
New Jersey Nets	17	65	.207	36	13–28	4–37	9–17

#	Eastern Conference				
#	Team	W	L	PCT	GB
1	c-Detroit Pistons	59	23	.720	–
2	y-Philadelphia 76ers	53	29	.646	6
3	x-Chicago Bulls	55	27	.671	4
4	x-Boston Celtics	52	30	.634	7
5	x-New York Knicks	45	37	.549	14
6	x-Milwaukee Bucks	44	38	.537	15
7	x-Cleveland Cavaliers	42	40	.512	17
8	x-Indiana Pacers	42	40	.512	17
9	Atlanta Hawks	41	41	.500	18
10	Washington Bullets	31	51	.378	28
11	Miami Heat	18	64	.220	41
12	Orlando Magic	18	64	.220	41
13	New Jersey Nets	17	65	.207	42

== Game log ==
=== Regular season ===
1989–90 game log
Total: 17–65 (Home: 13–28; Road: 4–37)
November: 3–11 (home: 1–4; road: 2–7)

Game	Date	Team	Score	High points	High rebounds	High assists	Location Attendance	Record
1	November 3, 1989	@ Miami	W 110–90	Hopson (19)	Shackleford (16)	Blaylock, Conner (5)	Miami Arena; 15,008	1–0
2	November 4, 1989	@ Orlando	W 111–106	Hopson (24)	Shackleford (12)	Blaylock (5)	Orlando Arena; 15,077	2–0
3	November 7, 1989	Miami	L 77–83	Hopson (17)	Shackleford (14)	Conner (3)	Brendan Byrne Arena; 11,999	2–1
4	November 9, 1989	@ New York	L 105–107	Morris (21)	Hopson (9)	Blaylock, Morris (6)	Madison Square Garden; 13,482	2–2
5
6
7
8
9
10
11
12
13
14

December: 5–9 (home: 3–5; road: 2–4)

Game	Date	Team	Score	High points	High rebounds	High assists	Location Attendance	Record
15	December 1, 1989	Miami	W 101–77	Shackleford (19)	Bowie (16)	Blaylock (3)	Brendan Byrne Arena; 10,240	4–11
16
17
18
19
20
21
22	December 19, 1989	@ Miami	W 100–98	Hopson (20)	Bowie (6)	Conner, Morris (5)	Miami Arena; 15,008	7–15
23
24
25	December 23, 1989	@ New York	L 85–94	Hinson, Morris (22)	Carroll (10)	Conner (6)	Madison Square Garden; 17,047	7–18
26
27	December 28, 1989	New York	L 104–106	Hopson (21)	Hinson (12)	Blaylock (6)	Brendan Byrne Arena; 20,049	8–19
28

January: 4–11 (home: 4–3; road: 0–8)

Game	Date	Team	Score	High points	High rebounds	High assists	Location Attendance	Record
29
30
31
32
33
34
35
36
37
38	January 19, 1990	@ Orlando	L 105–120	Carroll (22)	Carroll (11)	Conner (6)	Orlando Arena; 15,077	12–26
39
40	January 25, 1990	Orlando	L 112–117	Shackleford (22)	Bowie (11)	Conner (6)	Brendan Byrne Arena; 8,356	12–28
41
42
43

February: 1–11 (home: 1–5; road: 0–6)

Game	Date	Team	Score	High points	High rebounds	High assists	Location Attendance	Record
44
45
46
47
All-Star Break
48
49
50
51
52
53
54
55

March: 3–13 (home: 3–5; road: 0–8)

Game	Date	Team	Score	High points	High rebounds	High assists	Location Attendance	Record
56
57
58
59
60
61	March 10, 1990	@ New York	L 91–110	Gervin (24)	Haley (11)	Myers, Shackleford (5)	Madison Square Garden; 18,212	15–46
62
63
64
65
66
67
68
69
70	March 28, 1990	New York	W 106–101	Morris (24)	Morris (15)	Conner, Myers (6)	Brendan Byrne Arena; 18,438	16–54
71

April: 1–10 (home: 1–6; road: 0–4)

Game	Date	Team	Score	High points	High rebounds	High assists	Location Attendance	Record
72
73
74
75	April 8, 1990	Miami	W 102–101	Morris (23)	Bowie, Morris (11)	Wood (3)	Brendan Byrne Arena; 7,821	17–58
76
77
78
79
80
81
82	April 22, 1990	Orlando	L 102–110	Short (23)	Dudley (20)	Conner (5)	Brendan Byrne Arena; 12,248	17–65

1989–90 schedule

== Player statistics ==
Legend
GP	Games played	GS	Games started	MPG	Minutes per game
FG%	Field-goal percentage	3P%	3-point field-goal percentage	FT%	Free-throw percentage
RPG	Rebounds per game	APG	Assists per game	SPG	Steals per game
BPG	Blocks per game	PPG	Points per game

=== Regular season ===
Player	GP	GS	MPG	FG%	3P%	FT%	RPG	APG	SPG	BPG	PPG
Mookie Blaylock	50	17	25.3	.371	.225	.778	2.8	4.2	1.6	.3	10.1
Sam Bowie	68	54	32.5	.416	.323	.776	10.1	1.3	.6	1.8	14.7
Stanley Brundy	16	0	8.0	.500		.389	1.6	.2	.4	.3	2.3
Rick Carlisle	5	0	4.2	.143	.000		.0	1.0	.2	.2	.4
Joe Barry Carroll^{†}	46	20	21.8	.393	.000	.794	5.4	.9	.4	1.2	8.8
Lester Conner	82	61	28.7	.414	.154	.804	3.2	4.7	2.1	.1	7.9
Chris Dudley^{†}	27	8	24.9	.441		.305	8.1	.7	.8	1.1	6.1
Derrick Gervin	21	0	16.1	.472	.000	.730	3.1	.4	1.0	.3	12.0
Jack Haley^{†}	56	26	18.3	.394	.000	.661	5.0	.4	.3	.2	6.0
Roy Hinson	25	19	31.7	.507		.869	6.9	.9	.6	1.1	15.0
Dennis Hopson	79	64	32.3	.434	.317	.792	3.5	1.9	1.3	.6	15.8
Jaren Jackson	28	0	5.7	.362	.000	.810	.9	.5	.5	.0	2.4
Anthony Mason	21	0	5.1	.350		.600	1.6	.3	.1	.1	1.8
Chris Morris	80	76	30.6	.422	.316	.722	5.3	1.8	1.6	1.0	14.8
Pete Myers^{†}	28	2	19.4	.411	.000	.725	2.4	3.6	.7	.3	7.1
Charles Shackleford	70	37	22.2	.462	.000	.687	6.8	.8	.6	.5	8.2
Purvis Short	82	24	27.0	.455	.286	.835	3.0	1.8	.8	.2	13.1
Jay Taylor	17	0	6.7	.404	.231	.667	.6	.3	.3	.2	3.0
Leon Wood	28	2	7.1	.327	.190	.875	.4	1.7	.2	.0	1.8

- ^{†} Denotes player spent time with another team in the season. Stats reflect time with the Nets only.

Player statistics citation:
