= Eddie Lee Wilkins =

American basketball player (born 1962)

Personal information
- Born: May 7, 1962 (age 64) Cartersville, Georgia, U.S.
- Listed height: 6 ft 10 in (2.08 m)
- Listed weight: 220 lb (100 kg)

Career information
- High school: Cass (Cartersville, Georgia)
- College: Gardner–Webb (1980–1984)
- NBA draft: 1984: 6th round, 133rd overall pick
- Drafted by: New York Knicks
- Playing career: 1984–1993
- Position: Power forward / center
- Number: 21, 45, 55

Career history
- 1984–1985: New York Knicks
- 1985: Connecticut Colonials
- 1986: Westchester Golden Apples
- 1986: Valladolid
- 1986: Rockford Lightning
- 1987: New York Knicks
- 1987: Staten Island Stallions
- 1987–1988: Savannah Spirits
- 1988: Quad City Thunder
- 1988: Jersey Shore Bucs
- 1988–1991: New York Knicks
- 1991–1992: Ranger Varese
- 1992–1993: Philadelphia 76ers

Career highlights
- CBA All-Star (1988)
- Stats at NBA.com
- Stats at Basketball Reference

Eddie Lee Wilkins (born May 7, 1962) is an American former basketball player. A 6'10" power forward/center who played college basketball for the Gardner–Webb Runnin' Bulldogs, Wilkins played professionally for nine seasons in Italy, Spain and the United States, include six seasons in the NBA for the New York Knicks and the Philadelphia 76ers.

== Early life ==
Wilkins graduated from Cass High School in Cartersville, Georgia.

== College career ==
Wilkins played college basketball at Gardner-Webb University where he averaged 18.7 points during his career. During his junior season, he averaged 24.8 points per game. In 1991, he was inducted into Gardner-Webb Athletics Hall of Fame.

== Professional career ==
Following his college career, Wilkins was selected by the New York Knicks in the sixth round (133rd pick overall) of the 1984 NBA draft. In his debut, he scored an NBA career high 24 points. During his rookie season, he averaged 5.5 points and 4.9 rebounds per game. He missed the entire 1985–1986 season with torn knee ligaments.

Wilkins started the 1986–1987 season with Valladolid in Spain where he averaged 22 points and 10 rebounds before returning to the United States and signing with Rockford Lightning. In February 1987, he signed back with the Knicks.

On November 15, 1990, he scored 20 points in 20 minutes against the Portland Trail Blazers.

When Pat Riley came to New York, Wilkins was released. He spent the 1991–92 season in Italy with Ranger Varese before returning to the NBA the next season, signing a 2-year deal with the Philadelphia 76ers. Towards the end of the 1992–93 season, on April 15, 1993, the Sixers were playing the Orlando Magic, who were led by rookie Shaquille O'Neal. On a rebound attempt, Wilkins and O'Neal collided and became entangled. Wilkins tore his achilles tendon, missing the remainder of the season. His career was effectively ended.

In his NBA career, Wilkins played in 322 games and scored a total of 1,534 points.

== Personal life ==
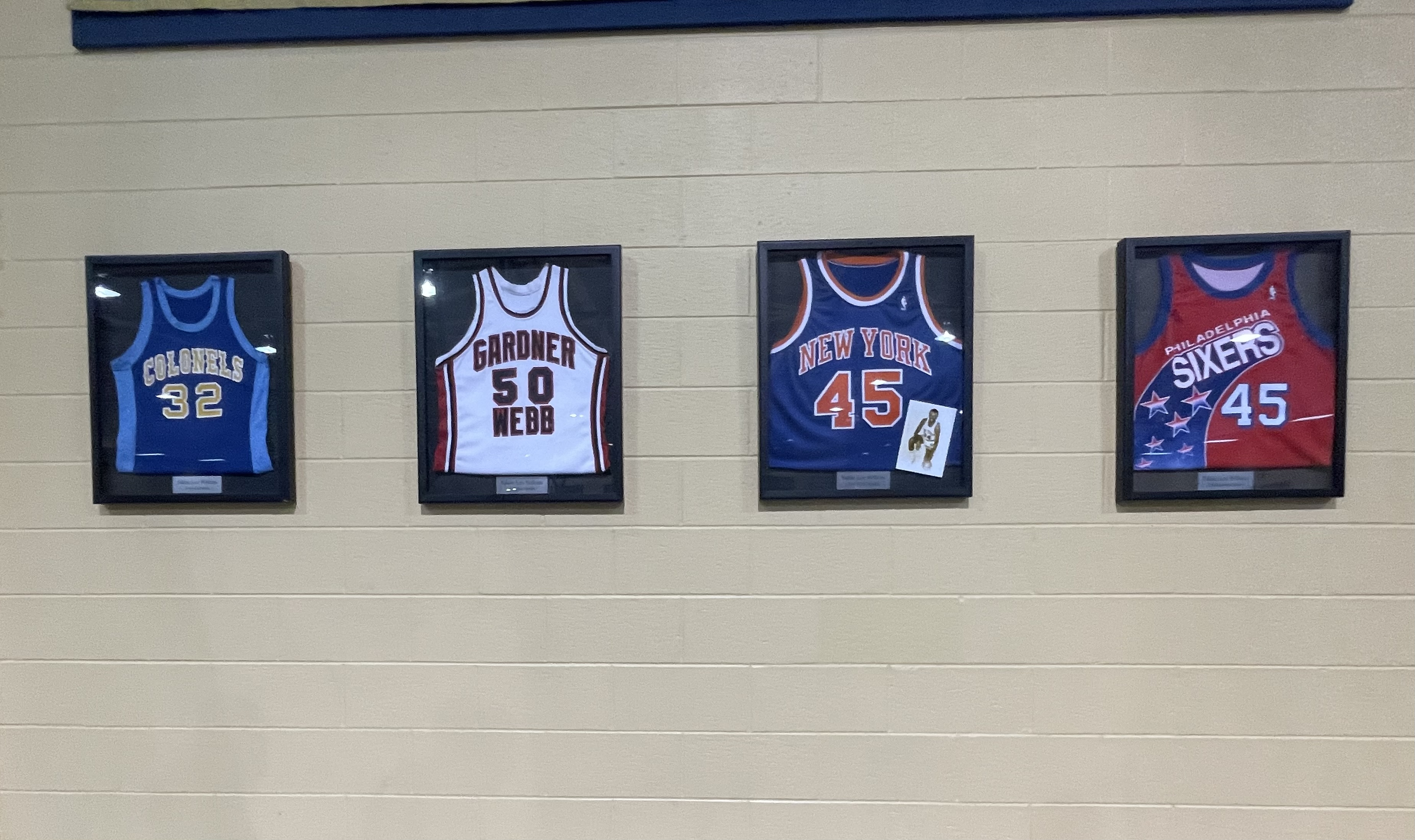
Collection of jerseys worn by Wilkins during his career

His youngest son Evan Wilkins, better known by his stage name Ev Young is a singer-songwriter.

In 1989, he established the Eddie Lee Wilkins Foundation, which later became the Eddie Lee Wilkins Youth Association. With the help of program director David Archer Jr., Wilkins and the association began providing athletic and social intervention activities for youth in the Cartersville and North Georgia area. Wilkins currently runs a youth basketball league in Smyrna, Georgia for youth boys ages 4 – 6.

== Career statistics ==
Legend
GP	Games played	GS	Games started	MPG	Minutes per game
FG%	Field goal percentage	3P%	3-point field goal percentage	FT%	Free throw percentage
RPG	Rebounds per game	APG	Assists per game	SPG	Steals per game
BPG	Blocks per game	PPG	Points per game	**Bold**	Career high

=== NBA ===
==== Regular season ====
Year	Team	GP	GS	MPG	FG%	3P%	FT%	RPG	APG	SPG	BPG	PPG
1984–85	New York	54	**16**	17.0	.498	.000	.541	**4.9**	**.3**	**.4**	**.3**	5.5
1986–87	New York	24	10	**18.9**	.441	.000	.466	4.5	**.3**	**.4**	.1	5.8
1988–89	New York	72	2	8.2	.465	.000	.550	2.1	.1	.1	.2	4.1
1989–90	New York	**79**	0	12.3	.455	.000	.605	3.4	.2	.2	.2	4.7
1990–91	New York	68	1	9.8	.447	.000	.567	2.6	.2	.3	.1	4.1
1992–93	Philadelphia	26	0	7.4	**.567**	.000	**.615**	1.5	.1	.3	.0	**6.1**
Career		322	29	11.8	.470	.000	.564	3.1	.2	.3	.2	4.8

==== Playoffs ====
Year	Team	GP	GS	MPG	FG%	3P%	FT%	RPG	APG	SPG	BPG	PPG
1989	New York	**7**	0	3.7	.455	–	.500	1.6	.0	.0	.0	2.1
1990	New York	**7**	0	7.7	.500	–	**.545**	1.6	.0	**.3**	.0	3.4
1991	New York	1	0	**13.0**	**.667**	–	.500	**2.0**	.0	.0	.0	**9.0**
Career		15	0	6.2	.514	–	.522	1.6	.0	.1	.0	3.2
