= 1989–90 Miami Heat season =

NBA professional basketball team season

- Head coach: Ron Rothstein
- General manager: Lewis Schaffel
- Owners: Ted Arison; Billy Cunningham; Lewis Schaffel
- Arena: Miami Arena

Results
- Record: 18–64 (.220)
- Place: Division: 5th (Atlantic); Conference: 11th (Eastern)
- Playoff finish: Did not qualify
- Stats at Basketball Reference

Local media
- Television: WBFS-TV; SportsChannel Florida (Sam Smith, Eric Reid)
- Radio: WQAM (Sam Smith, Eric Reid)

The 1989–90 Miami Heat season was the second season for the Miami Heat in the National Basketball Association. The city of Miami, Florida hosted the NBA All-Star weekend at the Miami Arena this season, which featured the 1990 NBA All-Star Game.

== Season summary ==
=== Off-season ===
After finishing with a league-worst 15–67 record in their inaugural season, the Heat received the fourth overall pick in the 1989 NBA draft, and selected small forward Glen Rice from the University of Michigan, and also selected point guard Sherman Douglas out of Syracuse University with the 28th overall pick. During the off-season, the team acquired Tellis Frank from the Golden State Warriors, and signed undrafted rookie power forward Terry Davis out of Virginia Union. After playing in the Midwest Division of the Western Conference the previous season, the Heat moved into the Atlantic Division of the Eastern Conference this season.

=== Regular season ===
With the addition of Rice and Douglas, the Heat got off to a 4–7 start to the regular season. However, the team continued to struggle by posting a nine-game losing streak between November and December, and then posting a 13-game losing streak between December and January. The Heat lost six straight games at the end of January, and later on held a 10–39 record at the All-Star break. The team posted an eight-game losing streak in February, and then posted another nine-game losing streak between March and April, losing 10 of their final 11 games of the season. The Heat finished in fifth place in the Atlantic Division with an 18–64 record, which was a three-game improvement over their inaugural season.

Second-year center Rony Seikaly averaged 16.6 points, 10.4 rebounds and 1.7 blocks per game, and was named the NBA Most Improved Player of the Year, while Douglas averaged 14.3 points, 7.6 assists and 1.8 steals per game, and was named to the NBA All-Rookie First Team, and Rice provided the team with 13.6 points and 4.6 rebounds per game, and was named to the NBA All-Rookie Second Team. In addition, Kevin Edwards contributed 12.0 points and 1.6 steals per game, while Billy Thompson provided with 11.0 points and 7.0 rebounds per game, Frank averaged 9.5 points and 5.0 rebounds per game, and Grant Long provided with 8.5 points and 5.0 rebounds per game. Meanwhile, Jon Sundvold contributed 6.1 points per game, Rory Sparrow provided with 5.9 points and 3.6 assists per game, and Davis averaged 4.7 points and 3.6 rebounds per game.

During the NBA All-Star weekend at the Miami Arena in Miami, Thompson participated in the NBA Slam Dunk Contest, while Sundvold participated in the NBA Three-Point Shootout for the second consecutive year. The Heat finished 14th in the NBA in home-game attendance, with an attendance of 615,328 at the Miami Arena during the regular season.

=== Aftermath ===
Following the season, Sparrow was traded to the Sacramento Kings, and Frank was released to free agency.

== Draft picks ==
Round	Pick	Player	Position	Nationality	School/Club team
1	4	Glen Rice	SF	United States	Michigan
2	28	Sherman Douglas	PG	United States	Syracuse
2	45	Scott Haffner		United States	Evansville

== Roster ==
1989–90 Miami Heat roster
Players

Pos.	No.	Player	Height	Weight	DOB	From
F/C	44	Terry Davis	6 ft 9 in (2.06 m)	225 lb (102 kg)	––	Virginia Union
G	11	Sherman Douglas	6 ft 0 in (1.83 m)	180 lb (82 kg)	––	Syracuse
G	21	Kevin Edwards	6 ft 3 in (1.91 m)	190 lb (86 kg)	––	DePaul
F	32	Tellis Frank	6 ft 10 in (2.08 m)	225 lb (102 kg)	––	Western Kentucky
G	3	Scott Haffner	6 ft 3 in (1.91 m)	180 lb (82 kg)	––	Evansville
F	43	Grant Long	6 ft 8 in (2.03 m)	225 lb (102 kg)	––	Eastern Michigan
F	41	Glen Rice	6 ft 7 in (2.01 m)	215 lb (98 kg)	––	Michigan
F/C	50	Jim Rowinski	6 ft 8 in (2.03 m)	250 lb (113 kg)	––	Purdue
C	4	Rony Seikaly	6 ft 11 in (2.11 m)	230 lb (104 kg)	––	Syracuse
G	2	Rory Sparrow	6 ft 2 in (1.88 m)	175 lb (79 kg)	––	Villanova
G	20	Jon Sundvold	6 ft 2 in (1.88 m)	170 lb (77 kg)	––	Missouri
F	55	Billy Thompson	6 ft 7 in (2.01 m)	195 lb (88 kg)	––	Louisville

Coaches
Head coach
- Ron Rothstein
Assistant(s)
- Tony Fiorentino
- Dave Wohl

Legend
- (DP) Unsigned draft pick
- (FA) Free agent
- (S) Suspended
- Injured

Roster

== Regular season ==
=== Season standings ===
Atlantic Division	W	L	PCT	GB	Home	Road	Div
y-Philadelphia 76ers	53	29	.646	–	34–7	19–22	19–7
x-Boston Celtics	52	30	.634	1	30–11	22–19	19–7
x-New York Knicks	45	37	.549	8	29–12	16–25	17–9
Washington Bullets	31	51	.378	22	20–21	11–30	10–16
Miami Heat	18	64	.220	35	11–30	7–34	4–22
New Jersey Nets	17	65	.207	36	13–28	4–37	9–17

#	Eastern Conference				
#	Team	W	L	PCT	GB
1	c-Detroit Pistons	59	23	.720	–
2	y-Philadelphia 76ers	53	29	.646	6
3	x-Chicago Bulls	55	27	.671	4
4	x-Boston Celtics	52	30	.634	7
5	x-New York Knicks	45	37	.549	14
6	x-Milwaukee Bucks	44	38	.537	15
7	x-Cleveland Cavaliers	42	40	.512	17
8	x-Indiana Pacers	42	40	.512	17
9	Atlanta Hawks	41	41	.500	18
10	Washington Bullets	31	51	.378	28
11	Miami Heat	18	64	.220	41
12	Orlando Magic	18	64	.220	41
13	New Jersey Nets	17	65	.207	42

z – clinched division title
y – clinched division title
x – clinched playoff spot

== Game log ==
=== Regular season ===
1989–90 game log
Total: 18–64 (home: 11–30; road: 7–34)
November: 4–12 (home: 2–4; road: 2–8)

Game	Date	Team	Score	High points	High rebounds	High assists	Location Attendance	Record
1	November 3	New Jersey	L 90–110				Miami Arena	0–1
2	November 4	@ New York	L 99–119				Madison Square Garden	0–2
3	November 7	@ New Jersey	W 83–77				Brendan Byrne Arena	1–2
4	November 8	@ Philadelphia	L 91–115				The Spectrum	1–3
5	November 10	@ Indiana	L 98–102				Market Square Arena	1–4
6	November 11	Detroit	W 88–84				Miami Arena	2–4
7	November 14	Houston	W 101–99				Miami Arena	3–4
8	November 15	@ Detroit	L 94–120				The Palace of Auburn Hills	3–5
9	November 18	@ Dallas	L 99–100				Reunion Arena	3–6
10	November 19	@ Houston	L 94–120				The Summit	3–7
11	November 21	@ Charlotte	W 98–87				Charlotte Coliseum	4–7
12	November 22	Philadelphia	L 103–113				Miami Arena	4–8

December: 3–11 (home: 1–7; road: 2–4)

Game	Date	Team	Score	High points	High rebounds	High assists	Location Attendance	Record
17	December 1	@ New Jersey	L 77–101				Brendan Byrne Arena	4–13
20	December 6	@ Philadelphia	L 98–121				The Spectrum	4–16
25	December 19	New Jersey	L 98–100				Miami Arena	7–18
28	December 26	New York	L 94–100				Miami Arena	7–21

January: 2–13 (home: 1–6; road: 1–7)

Game	Date	Team	Score	High points	High rebounds	High assists	Location Attendance	Record
39	January 17	Indiana	W 121–111				Miami Arena	9–30
40	January 19	Philadelphia	L 95–102				Miami Arena	9–31
44	January 26	@ Indiana	L 105–115				Market Square Arena	9–35

February: 3–10 (home: 3–5; road: 0–5)

Game	Date	Team	Score	High points	High rebounds	High assists	Location Attendance	Record
47	February 5	@ New York	L 107–116				Madison Square Garden	10–37
All-Star Break
52	February 17	Detroit	L 79–97				Miami Arena	10–42
53	February 19	@ Detroit	L 85–94				The Palace of Auburn Hills	10–42
55	February 23	New York	W 128–121				Miami Arena	11–44

March: 5–9 (home: 3–5; road: 2–4)

Game	Date	Team	Score	High points	High rebounds	High assists	Location Attendance	Record
62	March 11	New York	L 90–106				Miami Arena	14–48
67	March 20	Indiana	L 98–112				Miami Arena	15–52
68	March 21	@ Philadelphia	L 97–118				The Spectrum	15–53
69	March 23	Dallas	L 103–106				Miami Arena	15–54

April: 1–9 (home: 1–3; road: 0–6)

Game	Date	Team	Score	High points	High rebounds	High assists	Location Attendance	Record
76	April 8	@ New Jersey	L 101–102				Brendan Byrne Arena	17–59
79	April 16	@ New York	L 102–119				Madison Square Garden	17–62
80	April 18	Charlotte	L 91–98				Miami Arena	17–63

1989–90 schedule

== Player statistics ==
=== Ragular season ===
Player	POS	GP	GS	MP	REB	AST	STL	BLK	PTS	MPG	RPG	APG	SPG	BPG	PPG
Rory Sparrow	PG	82	25	1,756	138	298	49	4	487	21.4	1.7	3.6	.6	.0	5.9
Sherman Douglas	PG	81	66	2,470	206	619	145	10	1,155	30.5	2.5	7.6	1.8	.1	14.3
Grant Long	PF	81	31	1,856	402	96	91	38	686	22.9	5.0	1.2	1.1	.5	8.5
Billy Thompson	SF	79	45	2,142	551	166	54	89	867	27.1	7.0	2.1	.7	1.1	11.0
Kevin Edwards	SG	78	54	2,211	282	252	125	33	938	28.3	3.6	3.2	1.6	.4	12.0
Glen Rice	SF	77	60	2,311	352	138	67	27	1,048	30.0	4.6	1.8	.9	.4	13.6
Tellis Frank	PF	77	39	1,762	385	85	51	27	735	22.9	5.0	1.1	.7	.4	9.5
Rony Seikaly	C	74	72	2,409	766	78	78	124	1,228	32.6	10.4	1.1	1.1	1.7	16.6
Terry Davis	PF	63	9	884	229	25	25	28	298	14.0	3.6	.4	.4	.4	4.7
Jon Sundvold	SG	63	2	867	71	102	25	0	384	13.8	1.1	1.6	.4	.0	6.1
Scott Haffner	PG	43	6	559	51	80	13	2	196	13.0	1.2	1.9	.3	.0	4.6
Pat Cummings	C	37	1	391	93	13	12	4	175	10.6	2.5	.4	.3	.1	4.7
Jim Rowinski	PF	14	0	112	29	5	1	2	50	8.0	2.1	.4	.1	.1	3.6

== See also ==
- 1989-90 NBA season
