= Tellis Frank =

American basketball player and coach

Personal information
- Born: April 26, 1965 (age 61) Gary, Indiana, U.S.
- Listed height: 6 ft 8 in (2.03 m)
- Listed weight: 225 lb (102 kg)

Career information
- High school: Lew Wallace (Gary, Indiana)
- College: Western Kentucky (1983–1987)
- NBA draft: 1987: 1st round, 14th overall pick
- Drafted by: Golden State Warriors
- Playing career: 1987–2001
- Position: Power forward
- Number: 32

Career history

Playing
- 1987–1989: Golden State Warriors
- 1989–1990: Miami Heat
- 1990–1991: Phonola Caserta
- 1991: Minnesota Timberwolves
- 1991–1993: Phonola Caserta
- 1993–1994: Minnesota Timberwolves
- 1994–1995: Pitch Cholet
- 1995–1996: TDK Manresa
- 1996–1997: Caja San Fernando
- 1997–1998: León Caja España
- 1998–1999: Scandone Avellino
- 1999–2000: Basket Livorno
- 2000–2001: Longobardi Scafati

Coaching
- 2015: Atlanta Dream (assistant)

Career highlights
- Sun Belt Player of the Year (1987); First-team All-Sun Belt (1987)

Career NBA statistics
- Points: 1,710 (6.5 ppg)
- Rebounds: 1,022 (3.9 rpg)
- Stats at NBA.com
- Stats at Basketball Reference

Tellis Joseph Frank Jr. (born April 26, 1965) is an American former professional basketball player and former assistant coach for the Atlanta Dream of the Women's National Basketball Association (WNBA). At 6 ft 8.5 in (2.045 m) and 225 pounds (102 kg) he played as a power forward.

== High school & college career ==
Frank is a 1983 graduate of Lew Wallace High School (Gary, Indiana). He played college basketball for Western Kentucky from 1983 to 1987. At Western Kentucky, Frank was a key player in the resurgence of the basketball program. He led the team to its first Sun Belt Conference basketball championship, a top ten national ranking, a 2nd-place finish in the pre-season NIT, and back-to-back NCAA tournament appearances.

== Professional career ==
Frank was selected by the Golden State Warriors in the first round (14th overall pick) of the 1987 NBA draft. He played for the Warriors (1987–1989), Miami Heat (1989–1990) and Minnesota Timberwolves (1991–1992, 1993–1994) during his five-year NBA career, averaging 6.5 points per game. He was briefly signed by Cleveland Cavaliers in 1995, but did not play in any NBA games for the club.

He also played in Italy, for Phonola Caserta (1990–1993, won the league in 1991), Scandone Avellino (Serie A2, 1998–1999), Basket Livorno (Serie A2, 1999–2000) and Longobardi Scafati (Serie A2, 2000–2001). He also played in the Spanish Liga ACB with three teams in as many years.

== Career statistics ==
Legend
GP	Games played	GS	Games started	MPG	Minutes per game
FG%	Field goal percentage	3P%	3-point field goal percentage	FT%	Free throw percentage
RPG	Rebounds per game	APG	Assists per game	SPG	Steals per game
BPG	Blocks per game	PPG	Points per game	**Bold**	Career high

=== NBA ===
==== Regular season ====
Year	Team	GP	GS	MPG	FG%	3P%	FT%	RPG	APG	SPG	BPG	PPG
1987–88	Golden State	**78**	29	20.5	.428	.000	.725	4.2	**1.4**	**.7**	.3	8.1
1988–89	Golden State	32	2	7.7	.374	.000	**.765**	1.9	.5	.4	.2	3.3
1989–90	Miami	77	**39**	**22.9**	.458	–	**.765**	**5.0**	1.1	**.7**	.4	**9.5**
1991–92	Minnesota	10	0	14.0	**.545**	–	.667	2.6	.8	.5	.4	4.6
1993–94	Minnesota	67	11	14.3	.419	.000	.711	3.3	.9	.5	**.5**	2.8
Career		264	81	17.8	.439	.000	.741	3.9	1.0	.6	.4	6.5
