= 1989–90 Washington Bullets season =

NBA professional basketball team season

- Head coach: Wes Unseld
- General manager: Bob Ferry
- Owner: Abe Pollin
- Arena: Capital Centre (37 games); Baltimore Arena (4 games)

Results
- Record: 31–51 (.378)
- Place: Division: 4th (Atlantic); Conference: 10th (Eastern)
- Playoff finish: Did not qualify
- Stats at Basketball Reference

Local media
- Television: WDCA; Home Team Sports
- Radio: WTOP

The 1989–90 Washington Bullets season was the 29th season for the Washington Bullets in the National Basketball Association, and their 17th season in Washington, D.C..

== Season summary ==
=== Off-season ===
The Bullets received the ninth overall pick in the 1989 NBA draft, and selected power forward Tom Hammonds out of Georgia Tech University.

=== Regular season ===
The Bullets got off to a fast start by winning five of their first six games of the regular season. However, the team struggled losing 10 of their next 13 games, but managed to climb back into playoff position with a 12–11 record as of December 19, 1989. However, the Bullets lost 16 of their next 18 games, which included a seven-game losing streak in January, and held a 18–31 record at the All-Star break. The Bullets finished in fourth place in the Atlantic Division with a 31–51 record.

Jeff Malone led the Bullets in scoring averaging 24.3 points per game, while Bernard King averaged 22.3 points and 4.6 assists per game, and John Williams provided the team with 18.2 points, 7.6 rebounds and 4.7 assists per game, but only played just 18 games due to a season-ending knee injury. In addition, second-year guard Ledell Eackles contributed 13.5 points per game, while Mark Alarie provided with 10.5 points and 4.6 rebounds per game, and Darrell Walker contributed 9.5 points, 8.8 rebounds, 8.0 assists and 1.7 steals per game. Meanwhile, second-year forward Harvey Grant averaged 8.2 points and 4.6 rebounds per game, Hammonds provided with 5.3 points and 2.8 rebounds per game, Steve Colter contributed 4.9 points per game, and defensive center Charles Jones averaged 3.2 points, 6.2 rebounds and 2.4 blocks per game.

The Bullets finished last in the NBA in home-game attendance, with an attendance of 458,332 at the Capital Centre during the regular season, which was 27th in the league.

=== Aftermath ===
Following the season, Malone was traded to the Utah Jazz in a three-team trade, after seven seasons with the Bullets, and Colter was traded to the Sacramento Kings.

== Draft picks ==
Round	Pick	Player	Position	Nationality	College
1	9	Tom Hammonds	PF	United States	Georgia Tech
2	39	Ed Horton	PF	United States	Iowa
2	41	Doug Roth	C	United States	Tennessee

== Roster ==
1989–90 Washington Bullets roster
Players

Pos.	No.	Player	Height	Weight	DOB	From
F	31	Mark Alarie	6 ft 8 in (2.03 m)	217 lb (98 kg)	1963–12–11	Duke
G	20	Steve Colter	6 ft 3 in (1.91 m)	165 lb (75 kg)	1962–07–24	New Mexico State
G	21	Ledell Eackles	6 ft 5 in (1.96 m)	220 lb (100 kg)	1966–11–24	LSU New Orleans
F	44	Harvey Grant	6 ft 8 in (2.03 m)	195 lb (88 kg)	1965–07–04	Oklahoma
F	12	Tom Hammonds	6 ft 9 in (2.06 m)	215 lb (98 kg)	1967–03–27	Georgia Tech
F	32	Ed Horton	6 ft 8 in (2.03 m)	230 lb (104 kg)	1967–12–17	Iowa
C	23	Charles Jones	6 ft 9 in (2.06 m)	215 lb (98 kg)	1957–04–03	Albany State
F	30	Bernard King	6 ft 7 in (2.01 m)	205 lb (93 kg)	1956–12–04	Tennessee
G	24	Jeff Malone	6 ft 4 in (1.93 m)	205 lb (93 kg)	1961–06–28	Mississippi State
C	13	Doug Roth	6 ft 11 in (2.11 m)	255 lb (116 kg)	1967–08–24	Tennessee
C	50	Melvin Turpin	6 ft 11 in (2.11 m)	240 lb (109 kg)	1960–12–28	Kentucky
G	5	Darrell Walker	6 ft 4 in (1.93 m)	180 lb (82 kg)	1961–03–09	Arkansas
F	34	John Williams (injured)	6 ft 8 in (2.03 m)	235 lb (107 kg)	1966–10–26	LSU

Coaches
Head coach
- Wes Unseld
Assistant(s)
- Bill Blair
- Jeff Bzdelik

Legend
- (DP) Unsigned draft pick
- (FA) Free agent
- (S) Suspended
- Injured

Roster

== Regular season ==
=== Season standings ===
Atlantic Division	W	L	PCT	GB	Home	Road	Div
y-Philadelphia 76ers	53	29	.646	–	34–7	19–22	19–7
x-Boston Celtics	52	30	.634	1	30–11	22–19	19–7
x-New York Knicks	45	37	.549	8	29–12	16–25	17–9
Washington Bullets	31	51	.378	22	20–21	11–30	10–16
Miami Heat	18	64	.220	35	11–30	7–34	4–22
New Jersey Nets	17	65	.207	36	13–28	4–37	9–17

#	Eastern Conference				
#	Team	W	L	PCT	GB
1	c-Detroit Pistons	59	23	.720	–
2	y-Philadelphia 76ers	53	29	.646	6
3	x-Chicago Bulls	55	27	.671	4
4	x-Boston Celtics	52	30	.634	7
5	x-New York Knicks	45	37	.549	14
6	x-Milwaukee Bucks	44	38	.537	15
7	x-Cleveland Cavaliers	42	40	.512	17
8	x-Indiana Pacers	42	40	.512	17
9	Atlanta Hawks	41	41	.500	18
10	Washington Bullets	31	51	.378	28
11	Miami Heat	18	64	.220	41
12	Orlando Magic	18	64	.220	41
13	New Jersey Nets	17	65	.207	42

z - clinched division title
y - clinched division title
x - clinched playoff spot

== Game log ==
=== Regular season ===
1989–90 game log
Total: 31–51 (Home: 20–21; Road: 11–30)
November: 7–9 (home: 4–2; road: 3–7)

Game	Date	Team	Score	High points	High rebounds	High assists	Location Attendance	Record
1	November 3	@ Charlotte	W 116–96				Charlotte Coliseum	1–0
2	November 4	Detroit	L 93–95				Capital Centre	1–1
3	November 7	@ Atlanta	W 118–114				The Omni	2–1
4	November 8	Boston	W 112–103				Capital Centre	3–1
5	November 10	Cleveland (at Baltimore, Maryland)	W 100–92				Baltimore Arena	4–1
6	November 12	@ Portland	W 104–95				Memorial Coliseum	5–1
7	November 13	@ Utah	L 93–106				Salt Palace	5–2
8	November 15	@ Denver	L 98–109				McNichols Sports Arena	5–3
9	November 16	@ Seattle	L 98–111				Seattle Center Coliseum	5–4
10	November 18	@ Phoenix	L 107–118				Arizona Veterans Memorial Coliseum	5–5
11	November 19	@ L.A. Lakers	L 115–120				Great Western Forum	5–6
12	November 21	Milwaukee	W 97–91				Capital Centre	6–6
13	November 24	@ Philadelphia	L 108–121				The Spectrum	6–7
14	November 25	Miami	W 107–88				Capital Centre	7–7
15	November 28	@ Cleveland	L 91–92				Richfield Coliseum	7–8
16	November 29	Atlanta	L 104–111				Capital Centre	7–9

December: 5–7 (home: 5–4; road: 0–3)

Game	Date	Team	Score	High points	High rebounds	High assists	Location Attendance	Record
17	December 1	Philadelphia (at Baltimore, Maryland)	W 107–90				Baltimore Arena	8–9
18	December 2	Utah	L 98–100				Capital Centre	8–10
19	December 6	@ Detroit	L 107–115				The Palace of Auburn Hills	8–11
20	December 9	L.A. Lakers	W 103–101				Capital Centre	9–11
21	December 14	Charlotte	W 105–101				Capital Centre	10–11
22	December 16	Dallas	W 112–108				Capital Centre	11–11
23	December 19	Minnesota	W 112–99				Capital Centre	12–11
24	December 20	@ Philadelphia	L 111–118				The Spectrum	12–12
25	December 22	New York	L 112–122				Capital Centre	12–13
26	December 26	@ New Jersey	L 94–101				Brendan Byrne Arena	12–14
27	December 27	San Antonio	L 97–107				Capital Centre	12–15
28	December 30	Chicago	L 112–117 (OT)				Capital Centre	12–16

January: 3–13 (home: 2–4; road: 1–9)

Game	Date	Team	Score	High points	High rebounds	High assists	Location Attendance	Record
29	January 2	New Jersey	W 110–96				Capital Centre	13–26
30	January 3	@ Boston	L 101–120				Boston Garden	13–17
31	January 5	@ Cleveland	L 107–119				Richfield Coliseum	13–18
32	January 6	Boston	L 88–102				Capital Centre	13–19
33	January 9	@ New York	L 127–131 (OT)				Madison Square Garden	13–20
34	January 11	@ Miami	W 100–89				Miami Arena	14–20
35	January 13	Philadelphia	L 101–120				Capital Centre	14–21
36	January 15	Miami	L 105–111				Capital Centre	14–22
37	January 17	@ New Jersey	L 106–115				Brendan Byrne Arena	14–23
38	January 18	Milwaukee	L 112–115				Capital Centre	14–24
39	January 20	@ Houston	L 107–127				The Summit	14–25
40	January 22	@ San Antonio	L 115–124				HemisFair Arena	14–26
41	January 23	@ Dallas	L 105–129				Reunion Arena	14–27
42	January 25	Boston	W 112–103				Capital Centre	15–27
43	January 27	@ Philadelphia	L 101–125				The Spectrum	15–28
44	January 31	@ Detroit	L 109–133				The Palace of Auburn Hills	15–29

February: 7–6 (home: 4–3; road: 3–3)

Game	Date	Team	Score	High points	High rebounds	High assists	Location Attendance	Record
45	February 2	Sacramento	W 108–99				Capital Centre	16–29
46	February 3	Seattle	L 92–94				Capital Centre	16–30
47	February 5	Golden State	W 135–129				Capital Centre	17–30
48	February 6	@ Miami	W 118–100				Miami Arena	18–30
49	February 8	L.A. Clippers	L 103–105				Capital Centre	18–31
50	February 13	@ Sacramento	L 98–106				ARCO Arena	18–32
51	February 15	@ Golden State	L 107–113				Oakland–Alameda County Coliseum Arena	18–33
52	February 16	@ L.A. Clippers	W 118–112 (OT)				Los Angeles Memorial Sports Arena	19–33
53	February 18	Indiana (at Baltimore, Maryland)	W 116–97				Baltimore Arena	20–33
54	February 20	@ Atlanta	W 110–107				The Omni	21–33
55	February 22	New York	L 110–119				Capital Centre	21–34
56	February 24	Orlando	W 141–124				Capital Centre	22–34
57	February 27	@ Minnesota	L 88–104				Hubert H. Humphrey Metrodome	22–35

March: 5–9 (home: 3–5; road: 2–4)

Game	Date	Team	Score	High points	High rebounds	High assists	Location Attendance	Record
58	March 1	Detroit	L 85–99				Capital Centre	22–36
59	March 3	@ Orlando	W 132–128 (2OT)				Orlando Arena	23–36
60	March 6	@ Indiana	L 98–113				Market Square Arena	23–37
61	March 7	Phoenix	L 111–113				Capital Centre	23–38
62	March 9	@ Boston (at Hartford, Connecticut)	W 115–108				Hartford Civic Center	24–38
63	March 10	Portland	L 113–116				Capital Centre	24–39
64	March 15	@ Milwaukee	L 91–96				Bradley Center	24–40
65	March 17	Atlanta (at Baltimore, Maryland)	L 92–119				Baltimore Arena	24–41
66	March 20	@ Chicago	L 97–122				Chicago Stadium	24–42
67	March 21	New Jersey	W 136–106				Capital Centre	25–42
68	March 24	Philadelphia	L 112–114 (OT)				Capital Centre	25–43
69	March 27	@ New York	L 100–119				Madison Square Garden	25–44
70	March 28	Denver	W 113–99				Capital Centre	26–44
71	March 30	Orlando	W 143–115				Capital Centre	27–44

April: 4–6 (home: 2–3; road: 2–3)

Game	Date	Team	Score	High points	High rebounds	High assists	Location Attendance	Record
72	April 1	@ New Jersey	W 105–97				Brendan Byrne Arena	28–44
73	April 4	New York	L 107–118				Capital Centre	28–45
74	April 6	Houston	W 121–110				Capital Centre	29–45
75	April 7	@ Milwaukee	L 100–110				Bradley Center	29–46
76	April 10	@ Indiana	L 105–107				Market Square Arena	29–47
77	April 12	Cleveland	L 100–102				Capital Centre	29–48
78	April 14	Chicago	W 113–103				Capital Centre	30–48
79	April 17	@ Orlando	W 129–127				Orlando Arena	31–48
80	April 19	@ Chicago	L 117–120				Chicago Stadium	31–49
81	April 20	@ Miami	L 112–117				Miami Arena	31–50
82	April 22	Indiana	L 117–127				Capital Centre	31–51

1989–90 schedule

== Player statistics ==
Legend
GP	Games played	GS	Games started	MPG	Minutes per game
FG%	Field-goal percentage	3P%	3-point field-goal percentage	FT%	Free-throw percentage
RPG	Rebounds per game	APG	Assists per game	SPG	Steals per game
BPG	Blocks per game	PPG	Points per game

=== Regular season ===
Washington Bullets statistics
Player	GP	GS	MPG	FG%	3P%	FT%	RPG	APG	SPG	BPG	PPG
Mark Alarie	82	10	23.1	.473	.204	.812	4.6	1.7	.7	.5	10.5
Steve Colter	73	1	13.4	.478	.000	.811	2.4	2.0	.6	.1	4.9
Ledell Eackles	78	8	21.7	.439	.322	.750	2.2	2.3	.6	.1	13.5
Harvey Grant	81	25	22.8	.473	.000	.701	4.2	1.6	.6	.5	8.2
Tom Hammonds	61	8	13.2	.437	.000	.643	2.8	.8	.2	.2	5.3
Ed Horton	45	10	8.3	.494	.000	.609	2.4	.4	.2	.1	4.5
Charles Jones	81	81	27.7	.508		.648	6.2	1.7	.6	2.4	3.2
Bernard King	82	82	32.8	.487	.130	.803	4.9	4.6	.6	.1	22.4
Jeff Malone	75	74	34.2	.491	.167	.877	2.7	3.2	.6	.1	24.3
Doug Roth	42	0	9.8	.430	.000	.500	2.9	.5	.2	.3	1.9
Melvin Turpin	59	12	13.9	.526	.000	.789	3.7	.5	.3	.8	4.7
Darrell Walker	81	81	35.6	.454	.095	.687	8.8	8.0	1.7	.4	9.5
John Williams	18	18	35.1	.474	.111	.774	7.6	4.7	1.2	.5	18.2

Player statistics citation:

== See also ==
- 1989-90 NBA season
