= 1989–90 Indiana Pacers season =

NBA professional basketball team season

- Head coach: Dick Versace
- General manager: Donnie Walsh
- Owner: Herbert Simon
- Arena: Market Square Arena

Results
- Record: 42–40 (.512)
- Place: Division: 4th (Central); Conference: 8th (Eastern)
- Playoff finish: First round (lost to Pistons 0–3)
- Stats at Basketball Reference

Local media
- Television: WXIN–TV 59; Prime Sports Midwest (Bill Hazen, Clark Kellogg)
- Radio: WNDE–AM 1260 (Mark Boyle, Bobby "Slick" Leonard)

The 1989–90 Indiana Pacers season was the 14th season for the Indiana Pacers in the National Basketball Association, and their 23rd season as a franchise.

== Season summary ==
=== Off-season ===
The Pacers received the seventh overall pick in the 1989 NBA draft, and selected shooting guard George McCloud out of Florida State University. During the off-season, the team signed free agents Mike Sanders and Rickey Green.

=== Regular season ===
The Pacers won their first four games of the regular season, and later on got off to a solid 19–9 start to the season. However, the team struggled losing 14 of their next 18 games, which included two five-game losing streak between January and February, and held a 25–23 record at the All-Star break. The Pacers played around .500 in winning percentage for the remainder of the season, finishing in fourth place in the Central Division with a 42–40 record, and earning the eighth seed in the Eastern Conference.

Reggie Miller continued to show improvement averaging 24.6 points, 3.8 assists and 1.3 steals per game, and also leading the Pacers with 150 three-point field goals. In addition, Chuck Person averaged 19.7 points and 5.8 rebounds per game, while sixth man Detlef Schrempf provided the team with 16.2 points and 7.9 rebounds per game off the bench, second-year star Rik Smits provided with 15.5 points, 6.2 rebounds and 2.1 blocks per game, and Vern Fleming contributed 14.3 points and 7.4 assists per game. Meanwhile, LaSalle Thompson averaged 6.8 points and 7.7 rebounds per game, while off the bench, Sanders contributed 6.2 points per game, and Green provided with 3.5 points and 2.6 assists per game.

During the NBA All-Star weekend at the Miami Arena in Miami, Florida, Miller was selected for the 1990 NBA All-Star Game, as a member of the Eastern Conference All-Star team; it was his first ever All-Star appearance. In addition, Miller also participated in the NBA Three-Point Shootout for the second consecutive year. Miller finished in second place in Most Improved Player voting, behind Rony Seikaly of the Miami Heat, while Schrempf finished tied in sixth place; Schrempf also finished in second place in Sixth Man of the Year voting, behind Ricky Pierce of the Milwaukee Bucks.

The Pacers finished 21st in the NBA in home-game attendance, with an attendance of 518,923 at the Market Square Arena during the regular season.

=== NBA playoffs ===
In the Eastern Conference First Round of the 1990 NBA playoffs, the Pacers faced off against the top–seeded, and defending NBA champion Detroit Pistons, who won the Central Division title, and were led by the All-Star trio of Isiah Thomas, Joe Dumars, and Defensive Player of the Year, Dennis Rodman. The Pacers lost the first two games to the Pistons on the road at The Palace of Auburn Hills, before losing Game 3 at home, 108–96 at the Market Square Arena, thus losing the series in a three-game sweep.

The Pistons would go on to defeat the Portland Trail Blazers in five games in the 1990 NBA Finals, winning their second consecutive NBA championship.

=== Aftermath ===
Following the season, Green signed as a free agent with the Philadelphia 76ers.

== Draft picks ==
| Round | Pick | Player | Position | Nationality | College |
|---|---|---|---|---|---|
| 1 | 7 | George McCloud | SG/SF | United States | Florida State |

== Roster ==
1989–90 Indiana Pacers roster
Players

| Pos. | No. | Player | Height | Weight | DOB | From |
|---|---|---|---|---|---|---|
| C | 54 | Greg Dreiling | 7 ft 1 in (2.16 m) | 250 lb (113 kg) | 1962–11–07 | Kansas |
| G | 10 | Vern Fleming | 6 ft 5 in (1.96 m) | 185 lb (84 kg) | 1962–02–04 | Georgia |
| G | 12 | Rickey Green | 6 ft 0 in (1.83 m) | 170 lb (77 kg) | 1954–08–18 | Michigan |
| G/F | 20 | George McCloud | 6 ft 6 in (1.98 m) | 205 lb (93 kg) | 1967–05–27 | Florida State |
| G | 31 | Reggie Miller | 6 ft 7 in (2.01 m) | 185 lb (84 kg) | 1965–08–24 | UCLA |
| F | 42 | Calvin Natt | 6 ft 6 in (1.98 m) | 220 lb (100 kg) | 1957–01–08 | Louisiana–Monroe |
| F | 23 | Dyron Nix | 6 ft 7 in (2.01 m) | 210 lb (95 kg) | 1967–02–11 | Tennessee |
| F | 45 | Chuck Person | 6 ft 8 in (2.03 m) | 220 lb (100 kg) | 1964–06–27 | Auburn |
| F | 33 | Mike Sanders | 6 ft 6 in (1.98 m) | 210 lb (95 kg) | 1960–05–07 | UCLA |
| F | 11 | Detlef Schrempf | 6 ft 9 in (2.06 m) | 214 lb (97 kg) | 1963–01–21 | Washington |
| C | 24 | Rik Smits | 7 ft 4 in (2.24 m) | 250 lb (113 kg) | 1966–08–23 | Marist |
| F/C | 41 | LaSalle Thompson | 6 ft 10 in (2.08 m) | 245 lb (111 kg) | 1961–06–23 | Texas |
| F | 14 | Randy Wittman | 6 ft 6 in (1.98 m) | 210 lb (95 kg) | 1959–10–28 | Indiana |

Coaches
Head coach
- Dick Versace
Assistant(s)
- Mel Daniels
- Bob Hill
- George Irvine
- Bob Ociepka

Legend
- (DP) Unsigned draft pick
- (FA) Free agent
- (S) Suspended
- Injured

Roster
Updated: October 31, 1989

== Regular season ==
=== Season standings ===
| Central Division | W | L | PCT | GB | Home | Road | Div |
|---|---|---|---|---|---|---|---|
| y-Detroit Pistons | 59 | 23 | .720 | – | 35–6 | 24–17 | 22–8 |
| x-Chicago Bulls | 55 | 27 | .671 | 4 | 36–5 | 19–22 | 20–10 |
| x-Milwaukee Bucks | 44 | 38 | .537 | 15 | 27–14 | 17–24 | 14–16 |
| x-Cleveland Cavaliers | 42 | 40 | .512 | 17 | 27–14 | 15–26 | 14–16 |
| x-Indiana Pacers | 42 | 40 | .512 | 17 | 28–13 | 14–27 | 16–14 |
| Atlanta Hawks | 41 | 41 | .500 | 18 | 25–16 | 16–25 | 15–15 |
| Orlando Magic | 18 | 64 | .220 | 41 | 12–29 | 6–35 | 4–26 |

| # | Eastern Conference | | | | |
| # | Team | W | L | PCT | GB |
|---|---|---|---|---|---|
| 1 | c-Detroit Pistons | 59 | 23 | .720 | – |
| 2 | y-Philadelphia 76ers | 53 | 29 | .646 | 6 |
| 3 | x-Chicago Bulls | 55 | 27 | .671 | 4 |
| 4 | x-Boston Celtics | 52 | 30 | .634 | 7 |
| 5 | x-New York Knicks | 45 | 37 | .549 | 14 |
| 6 | x-Milwaukee Bucks | 44 | 38 | .537 | 15 |
| 7 | x-Cleveland Cavaliers | 42 | 40 | .512 | 17 |
| 8 | x-Indiana Pacers | 42 | 40 | .512 | 17 |
| 9 | Atlanta Hawks | 41 | 41 | .500 | 18 |
| 10 | Washington Bullets | 31 | 51 | .378 | 28 |
| 11 | Miami Heat | 18 | 64 | .220 | 41 |
| 12 | Orlando Magic | 18 | 64 | .220 | 41 |
| 13 | New Jersey Nets | 17 | 65 | .207 | 42 |

z - clinched division title
y - clinched division title
x - clinched playoff spot

== Game log ==
=== Regular season ===
1989–90 game log
Total: 42–40 (home: 28–13; road: 14–27)
November: 8–4 (home: 5–1; road: 3–3)

| Game | Date | Team | Score | High points | High rebounds | High assists | Location Attendance | Record |
|---|---|---|---|---|---|---|---|---|
| 1 | November 3, 1989 | @ Atlanta | W 126–103 | | | | The Omni | 1–0 |
| 2 | November 4, 1989 | Cleveland | W 106–98 | | | | Market Square Arena | 2–0 |
| 3 | November 8, 1989 | Detroit | W 95–74 | | | | Market Square Arena | 3–0 |
| 4 | November 10, 1989 | Miami | W 102–98 | | | | Market Square Arena | 4–0 |
| 5 | November 15, 1989 | @ L.A. Lakers | L 94–117 | | | | Great Western Forum | 4–1 |
| 6 | November 17, 1989 | @ Utah | L 100–114 | | | | Salt Palace | 4–2 |
| 7 | November 18, 1989 | @ Sacramento | L 102–107 | | | | ARCO Arena | 4–3 |
| 8 | November 21, 1989 | Boston | W 119–111 | | | | Market Square Arena | 5–3 |
| 9 | November 24, 1989 | @ Boston | W 118–111 | | | | Boston Garden | 6–3 |
| 10 | November 25, 1989 | Philadelphia | L 103–111 | | | | Market Square Arena | 6–4 |
| 11 | November 27, 1989 | @ Milwaukee | W 101–97 | | | | Bradley Center | 7–4 |
| 12 | November 29, 1989 | Utah | W 100–88 | | | | Market Square Arena | 8–4 |

December: 11–5 (home: 7–1; road: 4–4)

| Game | Date | Team | Score | High points | High rebounds | High assists | Location Attendance | Record |
|---|---|---|---|---|---|---|---|---|
| 13 | December 1, 1989 | Orlando | W 125–110 | | | | Market Square Arena | 9–4 |
| 14 | December 6, 1989 | Denver | W 136–117 | | | | Market Square Arena | 10–4 |
| 15 | December 8, 1989 | Chicago | W 106–104 | | | | Market Square Arena | 11–4 |
| 16 | December 9, 1989 | @ Detroit | L 93–121 | | | | The Palace of Auburn Hills | 11–5 |
| 17 | December 12, 1989 | Minnesota | W 113–112 (OT) | | | | Market Square Arena | 12–5 |
| 18 | December 14, 1989 | @ New Jersey | W 102–78 | | | | Brendan Byrne Arena | 13–5 |
| 19 | December 15, 1989 | Milwaukee | L 98–103 | | | | Market Square Arena | 13–6 |
| 20 | December 17, 1989 | @ Portland | L 113–121 | | | | Memorial Coliseum | 13–7 |
| 21 | December 19, 1989 | @ L.A. Clippers | L 102–128 | | | | Los Angeles Memorial Sports Arena | 13–8 |
| 22 | December 20, 1989 | @ Phoenix | W 131–130 (OT) | | | | Arizona Veterans Memorial Coliseum | 14–8 |
| 23 | December 22, 1989 | @ Golden State | L 124–150 | | | | Oakland-Alameda County Coliseum Arena | 14–9 |
| 24 | December 23, 1989 | @ Seattle | W 98–95 | | | | Seattle Center Coliseum | 15–9 |
| 25 | December 26, 1989 | Orlando | W 98–90 | | | | Market Square Arena | 16–9 |
| 26 | December 27, 1989 | @ Orlando | W 106–101 | | | | Orlando Arena | 17–9 |
| 27 | December 29, 1989 | Houston | W 103–97 | | | | Market Square Arena | 18–9 |
| 28 | December 30, 1989 | Atlanta | W 105–98 | | | | Market Square Arena | 19–9 |

January: 4–12 (home: 4–4; road: 0–8)

| Game | Date | Team | Score | High points | High rebounds | High assists | Location Attendance | Record |
|---|---|---|---|---|---|---|---|---|
| 29 | January 2, 1990 | @ Dallas | L 106–110 | | | | Reunion Arena | 19–10 |
| 30 | January 3, 1990 | @ Houston | L 103–117 | | | | The Summit | 19–11 |
| 31 | January 5, 1990 | @ Detroit | L 99–122 | | | | The Palace of Auburn Hills | 19–12 |
| 32 | January 6, 1990 | @ Charlotte | L 111–117 | | | | Charlotte Coliseum | 19–13 |
| 33 | January 8, 1990 | @ Philadelphia | L 116–120 | | | | The Spectrum | 19–14 |
| 34 | January 10, 1990 | Chicago | W 120–113 | | | | Market Square Arena | 20–14 |
| 35 | January 12, 1990 | New York | L 96–101 (OT) | | | | Market Square Arena | 20–15 |
| 36 | January 13, 1990 | Milwaukee | W 111–109 | | | | Market Square Arena | 21–15 |
| 37 | January 15, 1990 | Golden State | W 144–105 | | | | Market Square Arena | 22–15 |
| 38 | January 17, 1990 | @ Miami | L 111–121 | | | | Miami Arena | 22–16 |
| 39 | January 19, 1990 | @ Boston | L 104–109 | | | | Boston Garden | 22–17 |
| 40 | January 24, 1990 | L.A. Lakers | L 111–120 | | | | Market Square Arena | 22–18 |
| 41 | January 26, 1990 | Miami | W 115–105 | | | | Market Square Arena | 23–18 |
| 42 | January 27, 1990 | Cleveland | L 84–91 | | | | Market Square Arena | 23–19 |
| 43 | January 30, 1990 | @ Orlando | L 111–129 | | | | Orlando Arena | 23–20 |
| 44 | January 31, 1990 | Philadelphia | L 108–112 | | | | Market Square Arena | 23–21 |

February: 7–6 (home: 4–2; road: 3–4)

| Game | Date | Team | Score | High points | High rebounds | High assists | Location Attendance | Record |
|---|---|---|---|---|---|---|---|---|
| 45 | February 2, 1990 | Seattle | L 86–87 | | | | Market Square Arena | 23–22 |
| 46 | February 3, 1990 | @ New York | L 98–112 | | | | Madison Square Garden | 23–23 |
| 47 | February 6, 1990 | @ Denver | W 138–130 (OT) | | | | McNichols Sports Arena | 24–23 |
| 48 | February 8, 1990 | @ San Antonio | W 105–100 | | | | HemisFair Arena | 25–23 |
All-Star Break
| 49 | February 13, 1990 | Charlotte | W 128–105 | | | | Market Square Arena | 26–23 |
| 50 | February 14, 1990 | @ Cleveland | W 133–131 (OT) | | | | Richfield Coliseum | 27–23 |
| 51 | February 16, 1990 | @ Minnesota | L 105–111 | | | | Hubert H. Humphrey Metrodome | 27–24 |
| 52 | February 18, 1990 | @ Washington (at Baltimore, MD) | L 97–116 | | | | Baltimore Arena | 27–25 |
| 53 | February 21, 1990 | Atlanta | W 123–96 | | | | Market Square Arena | 28–25 |
| 54 | February 23, 1990 | Dallas | L 91–102 | | | | Market Square Arena | 28–26 |
| 55 | February 25, 1990 | Portland | W 117–112 | | | | Market Square Arena | 29–26 |
| 56 | February 27, 1990 | New Jersey | W 118–113 | | | | Market Square Arena | 30–26 |
| 57 | February 28, 1990 | @ Atlanta | L 99–102 | | | | The Omni | 30–27 |

March: 6–7 (home: 5–4; road: 1–3)

| Game | Date | Team | Score | High points | High rebounds | High assists | Location Attendance | Record |
|---|---|---|---|---|---|---|---|---|
| 58 | March 3, 1990 | L.A. Clippers | L 105–107 | | | | Market Square Arena | 30–28 |
| 59 | March 4, 1990 | @ Detroit | L 105–111 | | | | The Palace of Auburn Hills | 30–29 |
| 60 | March 6, 1990 | Washington | W 113–98 | | | | Market Square Arena | 31–29 |
| 61 | March 9, 1990 | Phoenix | L 130–134 | | | | Market Square Arena | 31–30 |
| 62 | March 10, 1990 | @ Chicago | L 105–117 | | | | Chicago Stadium | 31–31 |
| 63 | March 13, 1990 | San Antonio | L 102–103 | | | | Market Square Arena | 31–32 |
| 64 | March 16, 1990 | Atlanta | L 104–106 (OT) | | | | Market Square Arena | 31–33 |
| 65 | March 17, 1990 | @ Cleveland | L 102–118 | | | | Richfield Coliseum | 31–34 |
| 66 | March 20, 1990 | @ Miami | W 112–98 | | | | Miami Arena | 32–34 |
| 67 | March 21, 1990 | Milwaukee | W 112–96 | | | | Market Square Arena | 33–34 |
| 68 | March 23, 1990 | New Jersey | W 125–109 | | | | Market Square Arena | 34–34 |
| 69 | March 27, 1990 | Boston | W 101–96 | | | | Market Square Arena | 35–34 |
| 70 | March 29, 1990 | Sacramento | W 111–101 | | | | Market Square Arena | 36–34 |

April: 6–6 (home: 3–1; road: 3–5)

| Game | Date | Team | Score | High points | High rebounds | High assists | Location Attendance | Record |
|---|---|---|---|---|---|---|---|---|
| 71 | April 1, 1990 | @ Cleveland | L 91–121 | | | | Richfield Coliseum | 36–35 |
| 72 | April 3, 1990 | @ Chicago | L 102–109 | | | | Chicago Stadium | 36–36 |
| 73 | April 4, 1990 | @ Milwaukee | L 116–121 (OT) | | | | Bradley Center | 36–37 |
| 74 | April 6, 1990 | @ Orlando | W 123–115 | | | | Orlando Arena | 37–37 |
| 75 | April 8, 1990 | New York | W 99–97 | | | | Market Square Arena | 38–37 |
| 76 | April 10, 1990 | Washington | W 107–105 | | | | Market Square Arena | 39–37 |
| 77 | April 12, 1990 | @ New York | L 100–108 | | | | Madison Square Garden | 39–38 |
| 78 | April 14, 1990 | @ New Jersey | W 124–113 | | | | Brendan Byrne Arena | 40–38 |
| 79 | April 16, 1990 | Chicago | W 111–102 | | | | Market Square Arena | 41–38 |
| 80 | April 18, 1990 | @ Philadelphia | L 113–124 | | | | The Spectrum | 41–39 |
| 81 | April 20, 1990 | Detroit | L 115–121 (OT) | | | | Market Square Arena | 41–40 |
| 82 | April 22, 1990 | @ Washington | W 127–117 | | | | Capital Centre | 42–40 |

1989–90 schedule

== Playoffs ==
1990 playoff game log
Eastern Conference First Round: 0–3 (home: 0–1; road: 0–2)

| Game | Date | Team | Score | High points | High rebounds | High assists | Location Attendance | Series |
|---|---|---|---|---|---|---|---|---|
| 1 | April 26, 1990 | @ Detroit | L 92–104 | Detlef Schrempf (26) | Detlef Schrempf (7) | Vern Fleming (8) | The Palace of Auburn Hills; 21,454 | 0–1 |
| 2 | April 28, 1990 | @ Detroit | L 87–100 | Reggie Miller (23) | Chuck Person (12) | Vern Fleming (7) | The Palace of Auburn Hills; 21,454 | 0–2 |
| 3 | May 1, 1990 | Detroit | L 96–108 | Reggie Miller (22) | LaSalle Thompson (8) | Reggie Miller (4) | Market Square Arena; 15,301 | 0–3 |

1990 schedule

== Player statistics ==
=== Ragular season ===
| Player | POS | GP | GS | MP | REB | AST | STL | BLK | PTS | MPG | RPG | APG | SPG | BPG | PPG |
|---|---|---|---|---|---|---|---|---|---|---|---|---|---|---|---|
| Reggie Miller | SG | 82 | 82 | 3,192 | 295 | 311 | 110 | 18 | 2,016 | 38.9 | 3.6 | 3.8 | 1.3 | .2 | 24.6 |
| Vern Fleming | PG | 82 | 82 | 2,876 | 322 | 610 | 92 | 10 | 1,176 | 35.1 | 3.9 | 7.4 | 1.1 | .1 | 14.3 |
| Rik Smits | C | 82 | 82 | 2,404 | 512 | 142 | 45 | 169 | 1,271 | 29.3 | 6.2 | 1.7 | .5 | 2.1 | 15.5 |
| LaSalle Thompson | C | 82 | 60 | 2,126 | 630 | 106 | 65 | 71 | 554 | 25.9 | 7.7 | 1.3 | .8 | .9 | 6.8 |
| Mike Sanders | SF | 82 | 13 | 1,531 | 230 | 89 | 43 | 23 | 510 | 18.7 | 2.8 | 1.1 | .5 | .3 | 6.2 |
| Detlef Schrempf | PF | 78 | 18 | 2,573 | 620 | 247 | 59 | 16 | 1,267 | 33.0 | 7.9 | 3.2 | .8 | .2 | 16.2 |
| Chuck Person | SF | 77 | 73 | 2,714 | 445 | 230 | 53 | 20 | 1,515 | 35.2 | 5.8 | 3.0 | .7 | .3 | 19.7 |
| Rickey Green | PG | 69 | 0 | 927 | 54 | 182 | 51 | 1 | 244 | 13.4 | .8 | 2.6 | .7 | .0 | 3.5 |
| Randy Wittman | SF | 61 | 0 | 544 | 30 | 39 | 7 | 4 | 130 | 8.9 | .5 | .6 | .1 | .1 | 2.1 |
| Greg Dreiling | C | 49 | 0 | 307 | 87 | 8 | 4 | 14 | 65 | 6.3 | 1.8 | .2 | .1 | .3 | 1.3 |
| George McCloud | SF | 44 | 0 | 413 | 42 | 45 | 19 | 3 | 118 | 9.4 | 1.0 | 1.0 | .4 | .1 | 2.7 |
| Dyron Nix | SF | 20 | 0 | 109 | 26 | 5 | 3 | 1 | 39 | 5.5 | 1.3 | .3 | .2 | .1 | 2.0 |
| Calvin Natt | SF | 14 | 0 | 164 | 35 | 9 | 1 | 0 | 57 | 11.7 | 2.5 | .6 | .1 | .0 | 4.1 |

=== Playoffs ===
| Player | POS | GP | GS | MP | REB | AST | STL | BLK | PTS | MPG | RPG | APG | SPG | BPG | PPG |
|---|---|---|---|---|---|---|---|---|---|---|---|---|---|---|---|
| Reggie Miller | SG | 3 | 3 | 125 | 12 | 6 | 3 | 0 | 62 | 41.7 | 4.0 | 2.0 | 1.0 | .0 | 20.7 |
| Detlef Schrempf | PF | 3 | 3 | 125 | 22 | 5 | 2 | 1 | 61 | 41.7 | 7.3 | 1.7 | .7 | .3 | 20.3 |
| Chuck Person | SF | 3 | 3 | 123 | 20 | 12 | 1 | 0 | 40 | 41.0 | 6.7 | 4.0 | .3 | .0 | 13.3 |
| Vern Fleming | PG | 3 | 3 | 113 | 13 | 18 | 2 | 1 | 40 | 37.7 | 4.3 | 6.0 | .7 | .3 | 13.3 |
| Rik Smits | C | 3 | 3 | 96 | 16 | 3 | 2 | 4 | 37 | 32.0 | 5.3 | 1.0 | .7 | 1.3 | 12.3 |
| LaSalle Thompson | C | 3 | 0 | 54 | 15 | 2 | 0 | 1 | 18 | 18.0 | 5.0 | .7 | .0 | .3 | 6.0 |
| Rickey Green | PG | 3 | 0 | 31 | 1 | 3 | 1 | 0 | 2 | 10.3 | .3 | 1.0 | .3 | .0 | .7 |
| Mike Sanders | SF | 3 | 0 | 24 | 6 | 2 | 0 | 0 | 11 | 8.0 | 2.0 | .7 | .0 | .0 | 3.7 |
| Calvin Natt | SF | 2 | 0 | 14 | 2 | 1 | 0 | 0 | 2 | 7.0 | 1.0 | .5 | .0 | .0 | 1.0 |
| Randy Wittman | SF | 2 | 0 | 11 | 1 | 0 | 0 | 0 | 0 | 5.5 | .5 | .0 | .0 | .0 | .0 |
| George McCloud | SF | 1 | 0 | 4 | 1 | 0 | 0 | 0 | 2 | 4.0 | 1.0 | .0 | .0 | .0 | 2.0 |

== Awards and records ==
- Reggie Miller, NBA All-Star Game

== See also ==
- 1989-90 NBA season
