= 1989–90 San Antonio Spurs season =

- Division champions
- Head coach: Larry Brown
- General manager: Bob Bass
- Owner: Red McCombs
- Arena: HemisFair Arena

Results
- Record: 56–26 (.683)
- Place: Division: 1st (Midwest); Conference: 2nd (Western)
- Playoff finish: Conference semifinals (lost to Trail Blazers 3–4)
- Stats at Basketball Reference

Local media
- Television: KSAT-TV (Dave Barnett, Greg Simmons); Home Sports Entertainment (Dave Barnett, Greg Simmons)
- Radio: WOAI (Jay Howard)

The 1989–90 San Antonio Spurs season was the 14th season for the San Antonio Spurs in the National Basketball Association, and their 23rd season as a franchise.

== Season summary ==
=== Off-season ===
This was the first NBA season for rookie center David Robinson, who was selected by the Spurs as the first overall pick in the 1987 NBA draft; with his two-year tour of duty at the Navy over, Robinson arrived to the Spurs for the 1989–90 season. In the 1989 NBA draft, the Spurs received the third overall pick, and selected small forward Sean Elliott from the University of Arizona. During the off-season, the team acquired All-Star forward Terry Cummings from the Milwaukee Bucks, and acquired All-Star guard Maurice Cheeks, and David Wingate from the Philadelphia 76ers.

For the season, the Spurs redesigned their primary logo, which would be known as the "fiesta logo"; the team's primary logo featured the city name "San Antonio" in white letters above the team name "Spurs" in black letters, in front of a background of the fiesta colors of turquoise, fuchsia and orange. The team also redesigned their home and road uniforms; although their uniforms remained white, black and silver, the team name "Spurs" replaced the city name "San Antonio" on the front of their road jerseys.

The team's new primary logo, and new uniforms would both remain in use until 2002.

=== Regular season ===
With the addition of Robinson, Cummings, Cheeks and Elliott, the Spurs got off to a fast start by winning 19 of their first 25 games of the regular season. The team posted a six-game winning streak between November and December, posted a seven-game winning streak in December, and later on held a 32–14 record at the All-Star break. At mid-season, Cheeks, who only spent half a season with the Spurs appearing in 50 games, was traded to the New York Knicks in exchange for second-year guard Rod Strickland. The Spurs won their final seven games of the season, and finished in first place in the Midwest Division with a then franchise-best 56–26 record, earning the second seed in the Western Conference; the team posted a 35-game improvement over the previous season, and surpassed the 53-win season of 1982–83.

Robinson had one of the most successful rookie seasons for a center in NBA history, averaging 24.3 points, 12.0 rebounds, 1.7 steals and 3.9 blocks per game, as he was unanimously voted the NBA Rookie of the Year; he was also named to the All-NBA Third Team, to the NBA All-Rookie First Team and NBA All-Defensive Second Team. In addition, Cummings averaged 22.4 points, 8.4 rebounds and 1.4 steals per game, while second-year guard Willie Anderson provided the team with 15.7 points, 4.4 assists and 1.4 steals per game, and Elliott contributed 10.0 points per game, and was named to the NBA All-Rookie Second Team. Off the bench, Wingate provided with 6.8 points and 2.7 assists per game, and Frank Brickowski averaged 6.6 points and 4.2 rebounds per game.

During the NBA All-Star weekend at the Miami Arena in Miami, Florida, Robinson was selected for the 1990 NBA All-Star Game, as a member of the Western Conference All-Star team; it was his first ever All-Star appearance. Robinson also finished in sixth place in Most Valuable Player voting, while head coach Larry Brown finished in fifth place in Coach of the Year voting. The Spurs finished 16th in the NBA in home-game attendance, with an attendance of 586,787 at the HemisFair Arena during the regular season.

=== NBA playoffs ===
In the Western Conference First Round of the 1990 NBA playoffs, the Spurs faced off against the 7th–seeded Denver Nuggets, a team that featured All-Star guard Fat Lever, All-Star forward Alex English, and Michael Adams. It was also the first ever NBA playoff appearance for Robinson. The Spurs won the first two games over the Nuggets at home at the HemisFair Arena, before winning Game 3 on the road, 131–120 at the McNichols Sports Arena to win the series in a three-game sweep.

In the Western Conference Semi-finals, the team faced off against the 3rd–seeded Portland Trail Blazers, who were led by the quartet of All-Star guard Clyde Drexler, Terry Porter, All-Star center Kevin Duckworth and Jerome Kersey; the Trail Blazers started the series without Duckworth, who was out due to a right hand injury. The Spurs lost the first two games to the Trail Blazers on the road at the Memorial Coliseum, but then won the next two games at home at the HemisFair Arena. After losing Game 5 to the Trail Blazers at the Memorial Coliseum in double-overtime, 138–132, the Spurs won Game 6 at the HemisFair Arena, 112–97 to even the series. However, with Duckworth returning from his hand injury, the Spurs lost Game 7 to the Trail Blazers at the Memorial Coliseum in overtime, 108–105, thus losing in a hard-fought seven-game series.

The Trail Blazers would advance to the NBA Finals, but would lose to the defending NBA champion Detroit Pistons in five games in the 1990 NBA Finals.

=== Aftermath ===
Following the season, Brickowski was traded to the Milwaukee Bucks. As the 1980s ended, the 1989–90 season proved to be the rebirth of the Spurs franchise; this season would mark a turning point for the franchise, as the Spurs would miss the NBA playoffs only once between 1990 and 2019 (that coming in the 1996–97 season).

== Draft picks ==
Round	Pick	Player	Position	Nationality	College
1	3	Sean Elliott	SF	United States	Arizona

== Roster ==
1989–90 San Antonio Spurs roster
Players

Pos.	No.	Player	Height	Weight	DOB	From
G	40	Willie Anderson	6 ft 7 in (2.01 m)	190 lb (86 kg)	1967–01–08	Georgia
C	33	Uwe Blab	7 ft 1 in (2.16 m)	252 lb (114 kg)	1962–03–26	Indiana
C	43	Frank Brickowski	6 ft 9 in (2.06 m)	240 lb (109 kg)	1959–08–14	Penn State
F	34	Terry Cummings	6 ft 9 in (2.06 m)	220 lb (100 kg)	1961–03–15	DePaul
F	32	Sean Elliott	6 ft 8 in (2.03 m)	205 lb (93 kg)	1968–02–02	Arizona
F	27	Caldwell Jones	6 ft 11 in (2.11 m)	217 lb (98 kg)	1950–08–04	Albany State
F	34	Mike Mitchell	6 ft 7 in (2.01 m)	215 lb (98 kg)	1956–01–01	Auburn
G	00	Johnny Moore	6 ft 1 in (1.85 m)	175 lb (79 kg)	1958–03–03	North Carolina
C	50	David Robinson	7 ft 1 in (2.16 m)	235 lb (107 kg)	1965–08–06	Navy
G	1	Rod Strickland	6 ft 3 in (1.91 m)	175 lb (79 kg)	1966–07–11	DePaul
F	2	Reggie Williams	6 ft 7 in (2.01 m)	190 lb (86 kg)	1964–03–05	Georgetown
G	25	David Wingate	6 ft 5 in (1.96 m)	185 lb (84 kg)	1963–12–15	Georgetown

Coaches
Head coach
- Larry Brown
Assistant(s)
- R. C. Buford
- Ed Manning
- Gregg Popovich

Legend
- (DP) Unsigned draft pick
- (FA) Free agent
- (S) Suspended
- Injured

Roster
Updated: April 22, 1990

=== Roster notes ===
- Small forward Mike Mitchell was signed by the Spurs before the NBA playoffs began; he did not play with the team during the regular season.

== Regular season ==
The Spurs went from 21 to 61 in the 1988–89 NBA season to 56–26 in 1989–90, for a remarkable then record 35-game improvement, breaking the record of the 32 win improvement of the 1979-80 Boston Celtics. The Spurs would later break their own record in 1997-98, with a 36-game improvement, and the Boston Celtics would again regain the record with a 42-game improvement in 2007-08. They advanced to the second round of the Western Conference playoffs where they lost in seven games to the eventual western conference champions, the Portland Trail Blazers. Following the 1989–90 season, David Robinson was unanimously named the NBA Rookie of the Year, and subsequently SEGA produced a game featuring him entitled David Robinson's Supreme Court.

=== Season standings ===
Midwest Division	W	L	PCT	GB	Home	Road	Div
y-San Antonio Spurs	56	26	.683	–	34–7	22–19	19–9
x-Utah Jazz	55	27	.671	1	36–5	19–22	21–7
x-Dallas Mavericks	47	35	.573	9	30–11	17–24	17–11
x-Denver Nuggets	43	39	.524	13	28–13	15–26	15–13
x-Houston Rockets	41	41	.500	15	31–10	10–31	13–15
Minnesota Timberwolves	22	60	.268	34	17–24	5–36	6–22
Charlotte Hornets	19	63	.232	37	13–28	6–35	7–21

#	Western Conference				
#	Team	W	L	PCT	GB
1	z-Los Angeles Lakers	63	19	.768	–
2	y-San Antonio Spurs	56	26	.683	7
3	x-Portland Trail Blazers	59	23	.720	4
4	x-Utah Jazz	55	27	.671	8
5	x-Phoenix Suns	54	28	.659	9
6	x-Dallas Mavericks	47	35	.573	16
7	x-Denver Nuggets	43	39	.524	20
8	x-Houston Rockets	41	41	.500	22
9	Seattle SuperSonics	41	41	.500	22
10	Golden State Warriors	37	45	.451	26
11	Los Angeles Clippers	30	52	.366	33
12	Sacramento Kings	23	59	.280	40
13	Minnesota Timberwolves	22	60	.268	41
14	Charlotte Hornets	19	63	.232	44

== Game log ==
=== Regular season ===
1989–90 game log
Total: 56–26 (home: 34–7; road: 22–19)
November: 8–5 (home: 5–1; road: 3–4)

Game	Date	Team	Score	High points	High rebounds	High assists	Location Attendance	Record
1	November 4	L.A. Lakers	W 106–98				HemisFair Arena	1–0
2	November 8	Portland	L 104–108				HemisFair Arena	1–1
3	November 10	@ Utah	L 92–106				Salt Palace	1–2
4	November 11	Denver	W 122–108				HemisFair Arena	2–2
5	November 14	@ Milwaukee	L 97–108				Bradley Center	2–3
6	November 15	@ Minnesota	W 86–76				Hubert H. Humphrey Metrodome	3–3
7	November 17	@ Philadelphia	L 101–108				The Spectrum	3–4
8	November 18	@ New Jersey	W 110–95				Brendan Byrne Arena	4–4
9	November 21	Phoenix	W 107–98				HemisFair Arena	5–4
10	November 24	@ L.A. Clippers	W 90–89				Los Angeles Memorial Sports Arena	6–4
11	November 26	@ L.A. Lakers	L 112–132				Great Western Forum	6–5
12	November 28	Seattle	W 117–104				HemisFair Arena	7–5
13	November 30	Dallas	W 93–89				HemisFair Arena	8–5

December: 11–2 (home: 7–0; road: 4–2)

Game	Date	Team	Score	High points	High rebounds	High assists	Location Attendance	Record
14	December 2	Charlotte	W 118–110				HemisFair Arena	9–5
15	December 6	Golden State	W 121–119				HemisFair Arena	10–5
16	December 8	@ Dallas	W 99–93				Reunion Arena	11–5
17	December 9	New Jersey	W 109–92				HemisFair Arena	12–5
18	December 12	@ Atlanta	L 94–102				The Omni	12–6
19	December 14	Houston	W 104–100				HemisFair Arena	13–6
20	December 16	Orlando	W 125–116				HemisFair Arena	14–6
21	December 20	Sacramento	W 103–100				HemisFair Arena	15–6
22	December 22	@ Phoenix	W 119–115				Arizona Veterans Memorial Coliseum	16–6
23	December 23	Utah	W 115–98				HemisFair Arena	17–6
24	December 26	@ Charlotte	W 107–82				Charlotte Coliseum	18–6
25	December 27	@ Washington	W 107–97				Capital Centre	19–6
26	December 29	@ Chicago	L 97–101				Chicago Stadium	19–7

January: 10–6 (home: 7–0; road: 3–6)

Game	Date	Team	Score	High points	High rebounds	High assists	Location Attendance	Record
27	January 3	Philadelphia	W 103–94				HemisFair Arena	20–7
28	January 6	Minnesota	W 109–96				HemisFair Arena	21–7
29	January 8	@ Orlando	L 102–111				Orlando Arena	21–8
30	January 9	@ Miami	W 107–102				Miami Arena	22–8
31	January 12	@ Boston	W 97–90				Boston Garden	23–8
32	January 13	@ New York	L 101–107				Madison Square Garden	23–9
33	January 15	@ Cleveland	L 89–92				Richfield Coliseum	23–10
34	January 17	New York	W 101–97				HemisFair Arena	24–10
35	January 19	Cleveland	W 104–101				HemisFair Arena	25–10
36	January 20	@ Denver	L 99–126				McNichols Sports Arena	25–11
37	January 22	Washington	W 124–115				HemisFair Arena	26–11
38	January 24	L.A. Clippers	W 106–98				HemisFair Arena	25–13
39	January 26	@ Portland	L 103–109				Memorial Coliseum	26–13
40	January 27	@ Seattle	L 98–109				Seattle Center Coliseum	26–14
41	January 29	@ L.A. Lakers	W 86–84				Great Western Forum	28–13
42	January 31	Charlotte	W 129–95				HemisFair Arena	29–13

February: 8–5 (home: 4–3; road: 4–2)

Game	Date	Team	Score	High points	High rebounds	High assists	Location Attendance	Record
43	February 2	@ Charlotte	W 118–107				Charlotte Coliseum	30–13
44	February 3	Chicago	W 112–111				HemisFair Arena	31–13
45	February 6	Atlanta	W 105–94				HemisFair Arena	32–13
46	February 8	Indiana	L 100–105				HemisFair Arena	32–14
47	February 13	@ Dallas	L 96–103				Reunion Arena	32–15
48	February 14	Boston	L 95–106				HemisFair Arena	32–16
49	February 16	Utah	W 100–86				HemisFair Arena	33–16
50	February 17	@ Houston	W 104–102				The Summit	34–16
51	February 20	L.A. Lakers	L 114–115 (OT)				HemisFair Arena	34–17
52	February 23	Minnesota	W 105–95				HemisFair Arena	35–17
53	February 25	@ L.A. Clippers	W 107–106				Los Angeles Memorial Sports Arena	36–17
54	February 26	@ Sacramento	W 105–96				ARCO Arena	37–17
55	February 28	@ Golden State	L 135–144 (OT)				Oakland–Alameda County Coliseum Arena	37–18

March: 11–5 (home: 7–2; road: 4–3)

Game	Date	Team	Score	High points	High rebounds	High assists	Location Attendance	Record
56	March 2	Golden State	W 131–115				HemisFair Arena	38–18
57	March 3	@ Utah	L 98–112				Salt Palace	38–19
58	March 5	Houston	L 105–109				HemisFair Arena	38–20
59	March 10	Denver	W 118–111				HemisFair Arena	39–20
60	March 12	@ Minnesota	W 92–88				Hubert H. Humphrey Metrodome	40–20
61	March 13	@ Indiana	W 103–102				Market Square Arena	41–20
62	March 15	@ Detroit	L 98–110				Palace of Auburn Hills	41–21
63	March 17	Miami	W 111–98				HemisFair Arena	42–21
64	March 19	@ Phoenix	W 113–102				Arizona Veterans Memorial Coliseum	43–21
65	March 20	@ Seattle	W 128–106				Seattle Center Coliseum	44–21
66	March 22	Portland	W 107–106				HemisFair Arena	45–21
67	March 24	Detroit	W 105–98				HemisFair Arena	46–21
68	March 26	@ Houston	L 95–113				The Summit	46–22
69	March 27	Seattle	W 115–103				HemisFair Arena	47–22
70	March 29	Dallas	L 105–109				HemisFair Arena	47–23
71	March 31	Milwaukee	W 107–100				HemisFair Arena	48–23

April: 7–6 (home: 4–1; road: 3–5)

Game	Date	Team	Score	High points	High rebounds	High assists	Location Attendance	Record
72	April 3	Minnesota	L 90–92				HemisFair Arena	48–24
73	April 4	@ Dallas	L 98–104				Reunion Arena	48–25
74	April 7	@ Sacramento	W 111–93				ARCO Arena	49–25
75	April 8	@ Portland	L 105–112				Memorial Coliseum	49–26
76	April 10	@ Golden State	W 132–122				Oakland–Alameda County Coliseum Arena	50–26
77	April 12	L.A. Clippers	W 105–98				HemisFair Arena	51–26
78	April 14	Sacramento	W 105–94				HemisFair Arena	52–26
79	April 16	@ Charlotte	W 110–101				Charlotte Coliseum	53–26
80	April 18	Utah	W 102–93				HemisFair Arena	54–26
81	April 20	@ Denver	W 112–108				McNichols Sports Arena	55–26
82	April 22	Phoenix	W 108–93				HemisFair Arena	56–26

1989–90 schedule

=== Playoffs ===
1990 playoff game log
First Round: 3–0 (home: 2–0; road: 1–0)

Game	Date	Team	Score	High points	High rebounds	High assists	Location Attendance	Series
1	April 26	Denver	W 119–103	Willie Anderson (27)	David Robinson (13)	Rod Strickland (9)	HemisFair Arena; 15,910	1–0
2	April 28	Denver	W 129–120	David Robinson (31)	Terry Cummings (13)	Rod Strickland (13)	HemisFair Arena; 15,910	2–0
3	May 1	@ Denver	W 131–120	Terry Cummings (28)	David Robinson (16)	Rod Strickland (9)	McNichols Sports Arena; 15,604	3–0

Conference semifinals: 3–4 (home: 3–0; road: 0–4)

Game	Date	Team	Score	High points	High rebounds	High assists	Location Attendance	Series
1	May 5	@ Portland	L 94–107	Frank Brickowski (20)	David Robinson (9)	Rod Strickland (9)	Memorial Coliseum; 12,884	0–1
2	May 8	@ Portland	L 112–122	Terry Cummings (33)	David Robinson (8)	Rod Strickland (14)	Memorial Coliseum; 12,884	0–2
3	May 10	Portland	W 121–98	David Robinson (28)	Strickland, Cummings (9)	Rod Strickland (17)	HemisFair Arena; 15,910	1–2
4	May 12	Portland	W 115–105	Terry Cummings (35)	Terry Cummings (11)	Rod Strickland (14)	HemisFair Arena; 15,910	2–2
5	May 15	@ Portland	L 132–138 (2OT)	Terry Cummings (32)	David Robinson (15)	Rod Strickland (7)	Memorial Coliseum; 12,884	2–3
6	May 17	Portland	W 112–97	Willie Anderson (30)	David Robinson (13)	Rod Strickland (12)	HemisFair Arena; 15,910	3–3
7	May 19	@ Portland	L 105–108 (OT)	Terry Cummings (27)	David Robinson (16)	Rod Strickland (8)	Memorial Coliseum; 12,884	3–4

1990 schedule

== Player statistics ==
=== Regular season ===
Player	POS	GP	GS	MP	REB	AST	STL	BLK	PTS	MPG	RPG	APG	SPG	BPG	PPG
David Robinson	C	82	81	3,002	983	164	138	319	1,993	36.6	12.0	2.0	1.7	3.9	24.3
Willie Anderson	SG	82	81	2,788	372	364	111	58	1,288	34.0	4.5	4.4	1.4	.7	15.7
Terry Cummings	PF	81	78	2,821	677	219	110	52	1,818	34.8	8.4	2.7	1.4	.6	22.4
Sean Elliott	SF	81	69	2,032	297	154	45	14	810	25.1	3.7	1.9	.6	.2	10.0
Frank Brickowski	C	78	12	1,438	327	105	66	37	517	18.4	4.2	1.3	.8	.5	6.6
David Wingate	SG	78	2	1,856	195	208	89	18	527	23.8	2.5	2.7	1.1	.2	6.8
Caldwell Jones	PF	72	2	885	230	20	20	27	173	12.3	3.2	.3	.3	.4	2.4
Johnny Moore	PG	53	8	516	52	82	32	3	118	9.7	1.0	1.5	.6	.1	2.2
Maurice Cheeks^{†}	PG	50	49	1,766	167	302	82	5	545	35.3	3.3	6.0	1.6	.1	10.9
Vernon Maxwell^{†}	SG	49	2	1,118	141	146	42	5	340	22.8	2.9	3.0	.9	.1	6.9
Rod Strickland^{†}	PG	31	24	1,121	133	249	57	6	439	36.2	4.3	8.0	1.8	.2	14.2
Žarko Paspalj	SF	28	1	181	30	10	3	7	72	6.5	1.1	.4	.1	.3	2.6
Chris Welp^{†}	C	13	1	56	12	5	1	0	15	4.3	.9	.4	.1	.0	1.2
Reggie Williams^{†}	SF	10	0	68	8	5	1	3	42	6.8	.8	.5	.1	.3	4.2
Uwe Blab^{†}	C	7	0	50	9	1	0	0	15	7.1	1.3	.1	.0	.0	2.1
Jeff Lebo	SG	4	0	32	4	3	2	0	6	8.0	1.0	.8	.5	.0	1.5

- ^{†} Denotes player spent time with another team in the season. Stats reflect time with the Spurs only.

=== Playoffs ===
Player	POS	GP	GS	MP	REB	AST	STL	BLK	PTS	MPG	RPG	APG	SPG	BPG	PPG
Rod Strickland	PG	10	10	384	53	112	14	0	123	38.4	5.3	11.2	1.4	.0	12.3
Terry Cummings	PF	10	10	375	94	22	7	4	249	37.5	9.4	2.2	.7	.4	24.9
David Robinson	C	10	10	375	120	23	11	40	243	37.5	12.0	2.3	1.1	4.0	24.3
Willie Anderson	SG	10	10	375	54	52	9	4	205	37.5	5.4	5.2	.9	.4	20.5
Sean Elliott	SF	10	10	291	41	18	9	6	127	29.1	4.1	1.8	.9	.6	12.7
David Wingate	SG	10	0	293	37	38	18	3	91	29.3	3.7	3.8	1.8	.3	9.1
Frank Brickowski	C	10	0	161	44	11	8	1	79	16.1	4.4	1.1	.8	.1	7.9
Johnny Moore	PG	9	0	86	11	21	7	1	16	9.6	1.2	2.3	.8	.1	1.8
Caldwell Jones	PF	9	0	66	13	2	0	3	8	7.3	1.4	.2	.0	.3	.9
Reggie Williams	SF	9	0	49	11	3	2	0	20	5.4	1.2	.3	.2	.0	2.2
Mike Mitchell	F	4	0	15	3	2	0	0	6	3.8	.8	.5	.0	.0	1.5
Uwe Blab	C	2	0	5	2	0	0	0	3	2.5	1.0	.0	.0	.0	1.5

== Award winners ==
- David Robinson, NBA All-Star
- David Robinson, NBA Rookie of the Year
- David Robinson, All-NBA Rookie First Team
- David Robinson, All-NBA Team, Third Team
- David Robinson, All-NBA Defensive Second Team
- Sean Elliott, All-NBA Rookie Second Team
- Bob Bass, NBA Executive of the Year

== Transactions ==
=== Trades ===
May 28, 1989
To San Antonio Spurs----
- Terry Cummings
To Milwaukee Bucks----
- Cadillac Anderson
- Alvin Robertson
- 1989 2nd round pick (Frank Kornet)
August 28, 1989
To San Antonio Spurs----
- Maurice Cheeks
- Chris Welp
- David Wingate
To Philadelphia 76ers----
- Johnny Dawkins
- Jay Vincent
February 21, 1990
To San Antonio Spurs----
- Rod Strickland
To New York Knicks----
- Maurice Cheeks
February 22, 1990
To San Antonio Spurs----
- Uwe Blab
To Golden State Warriors----
- Chris Welp

=== Free agents ===
Player	Signed	Former team
Caldwell Jones	July 20, 1989	Portland Trail Blazers
Žarko Paspalj	July 28, 1989	KK Partizan
Jeff Lebo	September 29, 1989	North Carolina

Subtractions
Player	Date signed	New team
Scott Roth	Expansion Draft June 15, 1989	Minnesota Timberwolves
