= Brad Lohaus =

American basketball player (born 1964)

Personal information
- Born: September 29, 1964 (age 62) New Ulm, Minnesota, U.S.
- Listed height: 6 ft 11 in (2.11 m)
- Listed weight: 230 lb (104 kg)

Career information
- High school: Greenway (Phoenix, Arizona)
- College: Iowa (1982–1987)
- NBA draft: 1987: 2nd round, 45th overall pick
- Drafted by: Boston Celtics
- Playing career: 1987–1998
- Position: Power forward
- Number: 54, 44, 33

Career history
- 1987–1989: Boston Celtics
- 1989: Sacramento Kings
- 1989–1990: Minnesota Timberwolves
- 1990–1994: Milwaukee Bucks
- 1994–1995: Miami Heat
- 1995–1996: San Antonio Spurs
- 1996: New York Knicks
- 1996: Toronto Raptors
- 1998: San Antonio Spurs

Career highlights
- Second-team Parade All-American (1982); McDonald's All-American (1982)

Career NBA statistics
- Points: 3,854 (5.9 ppg)
- Rebounds: 1,869 (2.8 rpg)
- Assists: 714 (1.1 apg)
- Stats at NBA.com
- Stats at Basketball Reference

Bradley Allen Lohaus (born September 29, 1964) is an American former professional basketball player who was selected by the Boston Celtics in the second round (45th pick overall) of the 1987 NBA draft. A 6'11" center-power forward from the University of Iowa, Lohaus played 11 NBA seasons for eight teams: the Celtics, Sacramento Kings, Minnesota Timberwolves, Milwaukee Bucks, Miami Heat, San Antonio Spurs, New York Knicks, and Toronto Raptors. He was featured in the 1993 arcade edition of the popular video game NBA Jam.

== High school and college ==
Lohaus was a McDonald's All-American in 1982 at Greenway High School in Phoenix, Arizona under varsity coach Pete Babcock, who went on to work for six different NBA franchises in various capacities, including general manager.

Lohaus played at the University of Iowa from 1982 to 1987 under three different head coaches. He was recruited and played his freshman season under head coach Lute Olson. After Olson left for the University of Arizona, Lohaus reluctantly stayed at Iowa and played his sophomore and junior seasons under George Raveling (redshirting a year between seasons). He then flourished during his senior season under new coach Dr. Tom Davis as a shooting big man who defended the front of the Hawkeyes' fullcourt pressing defense. That year, the team reached the NCAA Elite Eight, ending with a school record 30 wins, with Lohaus averaging 11.3 points and leading the team in rebounds and blocked shots.

== Professional career ==
Lohaus was drafted by the Boston Celtics late in the second round; in 1987–88 the team went 57–25 in the regular season, and bowed out to the Detroit Pistons in the hard-fought six-game Eastern Conference Finals. He was traded along with Danny Ainge to the Sacramento Kings for Joe Kleine and Ed Pinckney on February 23, 1989.

Lohaus was acquired by the Minnesota Timberwolves in the 1989 NBA expansion draft, then traded on January 4, 1990, to the Milwaukee Bucks for center Randy Breuer, giving Lohaus the opportunity to further display his perimeter game and long-range shooting ability. He also completed his bachelor's degree at the University of Iowa the ensuing summer semester.

After that season, Lohaus played an additional four full seasons for the Bucks, scoring 314 three-point field goals (whereas he was 5 for 40 in his first 2 1/2 seasons). The Bucks advanced to the playoffs twice in that timeframe.

He then played for the Miami Heat in 1994–95 with former Iowa teammate Kevin Gamble, where Lohaus averaged 4.4 points per game. In 1996, Lohaus was acquired by the New York Knicks alongside J. R. Reid in a trade for Charles Smith and Monty Williams. The following offseason, Lohaus and Anthony Mason were traded to the Charlotte Hornets for Larry Johnson. Lohaus was cut by the Hornets before the start of the season. Lohaus then played for Toronto (November–December 1996), a stint with the Italian team Scavolini Pesaro (October–December 1997), then back again with the Spurs in 1997–98, later in the season and into the playoffs. During the lengthy NBA lockout in 1998–99, Lohaus contemplated retiring and ultimately did not play professionally again.

In his NBA career, Lohaus played in 656 games over 11 years, scoring a total of 3,854 points, and converting 392 three-point shots (over 30% of his total points scored).

Notably, Lohaus appears in the video game NBA Jam as a member of the Milwaukee Bucks.

== Career statistics ==
Legend
GP	Games played	GS	Games started	MPG	Minutes per game
FG%	Field goal percentage	3P%	3-point field goal percentage	FT%	Free throw percentage
RPG	Rebounds per game	APG	Assists per game	SPG	Steals per game
BPG	Blocks per game	PPG	Points per game	**Bold**	Career high

=== NBA ===
==== Regular season ====
Year	Team	GP	GS	MPG	FG%	3P%	FT%	RPG	APG	SPG	BPG	PPG
1987–88	Boston	70	4	10.3	**.496**	.231	.806	2.0	0.7	0.3	0.6	4.2
1988–89	Boston	48	15	15.4	.433	.000	.761	3.0	1.0	0.4	0.5	5.6
1988–89	Sacramento	29	10	16.4	.431	.143	.807	3.9	0.6	0.3	1.0	8.0
1989–90	Minnesota	28	**24**	21.1	.465	.063	.808	3.9	**2.2**	0.5	0.8	7.5
1989–90	Milwaukee	52	17	**26.0**	.458	.380	.701	**5.5**	2.0	**0.8**	**1.3**	**10.0**
1990–91	Milwaukee	**81**	3	15.0	.431	.277	.685	2.7	0.9	0.6	0.9	5.3
1991–92	Milwaukee	70	8	15.4	.450	.396	.659	3.6	1.1	0.6	1.0	5.8
1992–93	Milwaukee	80	**24**	22.1	.461	.370	.723	3.5	1.6	0.6	0.9	9.1
1993–94	Milwaukee	67	2	14.4	.363	.343	.690	2.2	0.9	0.4	0.8	4.0
1994–95	Miami	61	1	12.0	.420	.406	.667	1.7	0.7	0.3	0.4	4.4
1995–96	San Antonio	32	1	8.5	.406	.415	.667	1.0	0.5	0.1	0.2	3.3
1995–96	New York	23	7	14.1	.405	**.421**	**1.000**	1.3	1.2	0.3	0.4	3.9
1996–97	Toronto	6	0	7.5	.267	.286	.000	1.2	0.2	0.2	0.0	1.7
1997–98	San Antonio	9	0	11.3	.333	.286	.333	1.3	0.6	0.1	0.2	2.1
Career		656	116	15.8	.440	.361	.733	2.8	1.1	0.5	0.8	5.9

==== Playoffs ====
Year	Team	GP	GS	MPG	FG%	3P%	FT%	RPG	APG	SPG	BPG	PPG
1987–88	Boston	**9**	0	2.9	**.727**	.000	.000	0.4	0.0	0.0	0.1	1.8
1989–90	Milwaukee	4	**4**	**36.8**	.400	**.375**	.000	**6.8**	**1.3**	**2.0**	**2.3**	**9.5**
1990–91	Milwaukee	3	0	13.7	.313	**.375**	**.500**	3.0	0.3	0.0	0.0	4.7
1997–98	San Antonio	4	0	2.5	.000	.000	.000	0.5	0.3	0.3	0.0	0.0
Career		20	4	11.2	.426	.346	.500	2.1	0.4	0.5	0.5	3.4

=== College ===
Year	Team	GP	GS	MPG	FG%	3P%	FT%	RPG	APG	SPG	BPG	PPG
1982–83	Iowa	20	-	-	.310	**1.000**	.538	0.6	0.5	0.1	0.1	1.3
1983–84	Iowa	28	-	22.4	.404	-	.673	5.2	1.0	0.4	0.4	6.8
1985–86	Iowa	32	-	12.7	.431	-	**.794**	3.2	0.4	**0.5**	0.5	3.6
1986–87	Iowa	**35**	-	**26.9**	**.540**	.347	.692	**7.7**	**1.8**	**0.5**	**1.1**	**11.3**
Career		115	-	20.8	.467	.356	.695	4.6	1.0	0.4	0.6	6.3

== Personal life ==
He has had a home in the Iowa City area since 1987, and is a scout with the Spurs organization, covering the midwest region, and also is a broker for commercial airplanes and airplane parts. He endowed a full athletic scholarship to the Iowa Hawkeyes basketball program in 1996, the first former student-athlete to do so in the school's history. He and his wife Anne have two sons, Wyatt and Tanner, who both formerly played basketball for the Northern Iowa Panthers.
