= 1989–90 Minnesota Timberwolves season =

NBA professional basketball team season

- Head coach: Bill Musselman
- Owners: Harvey Ratner; Marv Wolfenson
- Arena: Hubert H. Humphrey Metrodome

Results
- Record: 22–60 (.268)
- Place: Division: 6th (Midwest); Conference: 13th (Western)
- Playoff finish: Did not qualify
- Stats at Basketball Reference

Local media
- Television: KSTP-TV/KITN-TV (Kevin Harlan, Len Elmore, Tom Hanneman)
- Radio: WDGY (Kevin Harlan, Dave Shea)

The 1989–90 Minnesota Timberwolves season was the inaugural season for the Minnesota Timberwolves in the National Basketball Association. Nearly 30 years after the Lakers left Minneapolis, Minnesota to relocate to Los Angeles, California, the NBA returned to Minnesota with an expansion team known as the "Timberwolves"; the Orlando Magic also joined the NBA in 1989 via expansion.

== Season summary ==
=== Off-season ===
The Timberwolves revealed their new primary logo, adding blue, green, white and silver to their color scheme; the team's primary logo featured a blue and white wolf with green eyes, in front of a silver basketball with blue seams surrounded by a green outline, and above the state name "Minnesota" in green letters and the team name "Timberwolves" in blue letters. The team also revealed new white home uniforms, and new blue road uniforms; both uniforms featured a blue, white and green trim, and the team's primary logo on the left and right legs of their shorts. The team's new primary logo, and new uniforms would both remain in use until 1996. For their inaugural season, the Timberwolves played their home games at the Hubert H. Humphrey Metrodome in Minneapolis, which was home to the NFL's Minnesota Vikings, and also home to the MLB's Minnesota Twins.

In the 1989 NBA expansion draft, the Timberwolves selected veteran players like Rick Mahorn, Tyrone Corbin, Steve Johnson, Brad Lohaus and Scott Roth. The team also signed free agents, Tony Campbell, who won an NBA championship with the Los Angeles Lakers in the 1988 NBA Finals, and rookie small forward Sam Mitchell out of Mercer University; Mitchell was drafted by the Houston Rockets as a third-round draft pick in the 1985 NBA draft, but was released to free agency during the preseason, and previously played overseas in France, and in the Continental Basketball Association. Other free agents included Tod Murphy, who previously played overseas in Spain, and Sidney Lowe.

However, Mahorn never played for the Timberwolves due to a contract dispute, and was later on traded to the Philadelphia 76ers; Mahorn previously won a championship with the Detroit Pistons, in which they defeated the Los Angeles Lakers in a four-game sweep in the 1989 NBA Finals. The Timberwolves received the tenth overall pick in the 1989 NBA draft, and selected point guard Pooh Richardson from the University of California, Los Angeles, and also hired Bill Musselman as their first ever head coach.

=== Regular season ===
The Timberwolves made their NBA regular season debut on November 3, 1989, in which the team lost to the Seattle SuperSonics on the road, 106–94 at the Seattle Center Coliseum; off the bench, Corbin led the team with 20 points and 8 rebounds, while Roth contributed 19 points. Five days later on November 8, the team made their home debut at the Hubert H. Humphrey Metrodome, losing to the Chicago Bulls by a score of 96–84, in front of 35,427 fans in attendance; All-Star guard Michael Jordan led the Bulls with 45 points, while Campbell led the Timberwolves with a double-double of 31 points and 10 rebounds. Just two nights later on November 10, the Timberwolves won their first ever game in franchise history, defeating the 76ers at the Hubert H. Humphrey Metrodome in overtime, 125–118; Campbell finished with 38 points, while Corbin posted a double-double of 36 points and 13 rebounds, and Roth added 20 points off the bench.

The Timberwolves struggled losing 11 of their first 13 games of the regular season, which included a seven-game losing streak in November. The team posted two nine-game losing streaks between December and January, and later on held a 10–36 record at the All-Star break. At mid-season, the team traded Lohaus to the Milwaukee Bucks in exchange for former University of Minnesota center, Randy Breuer. The Timberwolves lost eight of their final nine games, and finished their inaugural season in sixth place in the Midwest Division with a record of 22 wins and 60 losses.

Campbell led the Timberwolves in scoring, averaging 23.2 points, 5.5 rebounds and 1.4 steals per game, while Corbin averaged 14.7 points, 7.4 rebounds, and 2.1 steals per game, and Mitchell provided the team with 12.7 points and 5.8 rebounds per game, reaching 20 or more points on 14 occasions as a 26 year-old rookie. In addition, Richardson contributed 11.4 points, 6.8 assists, and 1.6 steals per game, and was named to the NBA All-Rookie First Team, while Breuer provided with 10.2 points, 5.7 rebounds and 1.5 blocks per game in 51 games after the trade, and Murphy averaged 8.3 points and 6.9 rebounds per game. Meanwhile, Roth contributed 6.8 points per game, and Lowe provided with 2.3 points and 4.2 assists per game, but struggled as he only shot .319 in field-goal percentage.

Campbell finished in third place in Most Improved Player voting, while Musselman finished in sixth place in Coach of the Year voting. The Timberwolves led the NBA in home-game attendance, with an attendance of 1,072,572 at the Hubert H. Humphrey Metrodome during the regular season.

=== Aftermath ===
Following the season, Roth was released to free agency, and Lowe retired.

== Draft picks ==
Round	Pick	Player	Position	Nationality	College
1	10	Pooh Richardson	PG	United States	UCLA
2	34	Gary Leonard	C	United States	Missouri
2	38	Doug West	SG	United States	Villanova

== Roster ==
1989–90 Minnesota Timberwolves roster
Players

Pos.	No.	Player	Height	Weight	DOB	From
C	45	Randy Breuer	7 ft 3 in (2.21 m)	230 lb (104 kg)	1960–10–11	Minnesota
G/F	19	Tony Campbell	6 ft 7 in (2.01 m)	215 lb (98 kg)	1962–05–07	Ohio State
G/F	23	Tyrone Corbin	6 ft 6 in (1.98 m)	210 lb (95 kg)	1962–12–31	DePaul
C	52	Gary Leonard	7 ft 1 in (2.16 m)	250 lb (113 kg)	1967–02–16	Missouri
G	35	Sidney Lowe	6 ft 0 in (1.83 m)	195 lb (88 kg)	1960–01–21	NC State
F	42	Sam Mitchell	6 ft 6 in (1.98 m)	210 lb (95 kg)	1963–09–02	Mercer
C	4	Tod Murphy	6 ft 9 in (2.06 m)	220 lb (100 kg)	1963–12–24	UC Irvine
G	24	Pooh Richardson	6 ft 1 in (1.85 m)	180 lb (82 kg)	1966–05–14	UCLA
F	3	Scott Roth	6 ft 8 in (2.03 m)	212 lb (96 kg)	1963–06–03	Wisconsin
F	15	Donald Royal	6 ft 8 in (2.03 m)	210 lb (95 kg)	1966–05–22	Notre Dame
F/C	2	Brad Sellers	7 ft 0 in (2.13 m)	210 lb (95 kg)	1962–12–17	Ohio State
G/F	5	Doug West	6 ft 6 in (1.98 m)	200 lb (91 kg)	1967–05–27	Villanova

Coaches
Head coach
- Bill Musselman
Assistant(s)
- Tom Thibodeau
- Bob Zuffelato

Legend
- (DP) Unsigned draft pick
- (FA) Free agent
- (S) Suspended
- Injured

== NBA expansion draft ==
Prior to the 1989 NBA draft, the NBA held a coin toss between the Timberwolves and the other new expansion team, the Orlando Magic, to determine their order for the NBA draft and the expansion draft. The Magic won the coin toss and chose to have the first pick in the expansion draft and pick 11th in the NBA draft, while the Timberwolves picked second in the expansion draft and 10th in the NBA draft.

The previous season's expansion teams, the Charlotte Hornets and Miami Heat, were not involved in this year's expansion draft and did not lose any player.

Pick	Player	Position	Nationality	Previous team
2	Rick Mahorn	F/C	United States	Detroit Pistons
4	Tyrone Corbin	G/F	United States	Phoenix Suns
6	Steve Johnson	F/C	United States	Portland Trail Blazers
8	Brad Lohaus	F/C	United States	Sacramento Kings
10	David Rivers	G	United States	Los Angeles Lakers
12	Mark Davis	G/F	United States	Milwaukee Bucks
14	Scott Roth	F	United States	San Antonio Spurs
16	Shelton Jones	F	United States	Philadelphia 76ers
18	Eric White	F	United States	Los Angeles Clippers
20	Maurice Martin	G/F	United States	Denver Nuggets
22	Gunther Behnke	C	West Germany	Cleveland Cavaliers

== Regular season ==
=== Standings ===
Midwest Division	W	L	PCT	GB	Home	Road	Div
y-San Antonio Spurs	56	26	.683	–	34–7	22–19	19–9
x-Utah Jazz	55	27	.671	1	36–5	19–22	21–7
x-Dallas Mavericks	47	35	.573	9	30–11	17–24	17–11
x-Denver Nuggets	43	39	.524	13	28–13	15–26	15–13
x-Houston Rockets	41	41	.500	15	31–10	10–31	13–15
Minnesota Timberwolves	22	60	.268	34	17–24	5–36	6–22
Charlotte Hornets	19	63	.232	37	13–28	6–35	7–21

#	Western Conference				
#	Team	W	L	PCT	GB
1	z-Los Angeles Lakers	63	19	.768	–
2	y-San Antonio Spurs	56	26	.683	7
3	x-Portland Trail Blazers	59	23	.720	4
4	x-Utah Jazz	55	27	.671	8
5	x-Phoenix Suns	54	28	.659	9
6	x-Dallas Mavericks	47	35	.573	16
7	x-Denver Nuggets	43	39	.524	20
8	x-Houston Rockets	41	41	.500	22
9	Seattle SuperSonics	41	41	.500	22
10	Golden State Warriors	37	45	.451	26
11	Los Angeles Clippers	30	52	.366	33
12	Sacramento Kings	23	59	.280	40
13	Minnesota Timberwolves	22	60	.268	41
14	Charlotte Hornets	19	63	.232	44

== Player statistics ==
=== Regular season ===
Player	POS	GP	GS	MP	REB	AST	STL	BLK	PTS	MPG	RPG	APG	SPG	BPG	PPG
Tony Campbell	SG	82	81	3,164	451	213	111	31	1,903	38.6	5.5	2.6	1.4	.4	23.2
Tyrone Corbin	SF	82	80	3,011	604	216	175	41	1,203	36.7	7.4	2.6	2.1	.5	14.7
Tod Murphy	C	82	59	2,493	564	106	76	60	680	30.4	6.9	1.3	.9	.7	8.3
Pooh Richardson	PG	82	48	2,581	217	554	133	25	938	31.5	2.6	6.8	1.6	.3	11.4
Sidney Lowe	PG	80	38	1,744	163	337	73	4	187	21.8	2.0	4.2	.9	.1	2.3
Sam Mitchell	PF	80	30	2,414	462	89	66	54	1,012	30.2	5.8	1.1	.8	.7	12.7
Scott Roth	SF	71	3	1,061	112	115	51	6	486	14.9	1.6	1.6	.7	.1	6.8
Donald Royal	SF	66	0	746	137	43	32	8	387	11.3	2.1	.7	.5	.1	5.9
Doug West	SG	52	0	378	70	18	10	6	135	7.3	1.3	.3	.2	.1	2.6
Randy Breuer^{†}	C	51	47	1,325	290	84	33	75	518	26.0	5.7	1.6	.6	1.5	10.2
Brad Lohaus^{†}	PF	28	24	590	110	62	14	22	210	21.1	3.9	2.2	.5	.8	7.5
Gary Leonard	C	22	0	127	27	1	3	9	32	5.8	1.2	.0	.1	.4	1.5
Brad Sellers^{†}	PF	14	0	113	19	1	6	3	47	8.1	1.4	.1	.4	.2	3.4
Adrian Branch	SF	11	0	91	20	4	6	0	65	8.3	1.8	.4	.5	.0	5.9
Steve Johnson^{†}	C	4	0	17	3	1	0	0	0	4.3	.8	.3	.0	.0	.0

- ^{†} Denotes player spent time with another team in the season. Stats reflect time with the Timberwolves only.

== Awards and honors ==
- Pooh Richardson, NBA All-Rookie Team
