= Tony Brown (basketball) =

American basketball player and coach (born 1960)

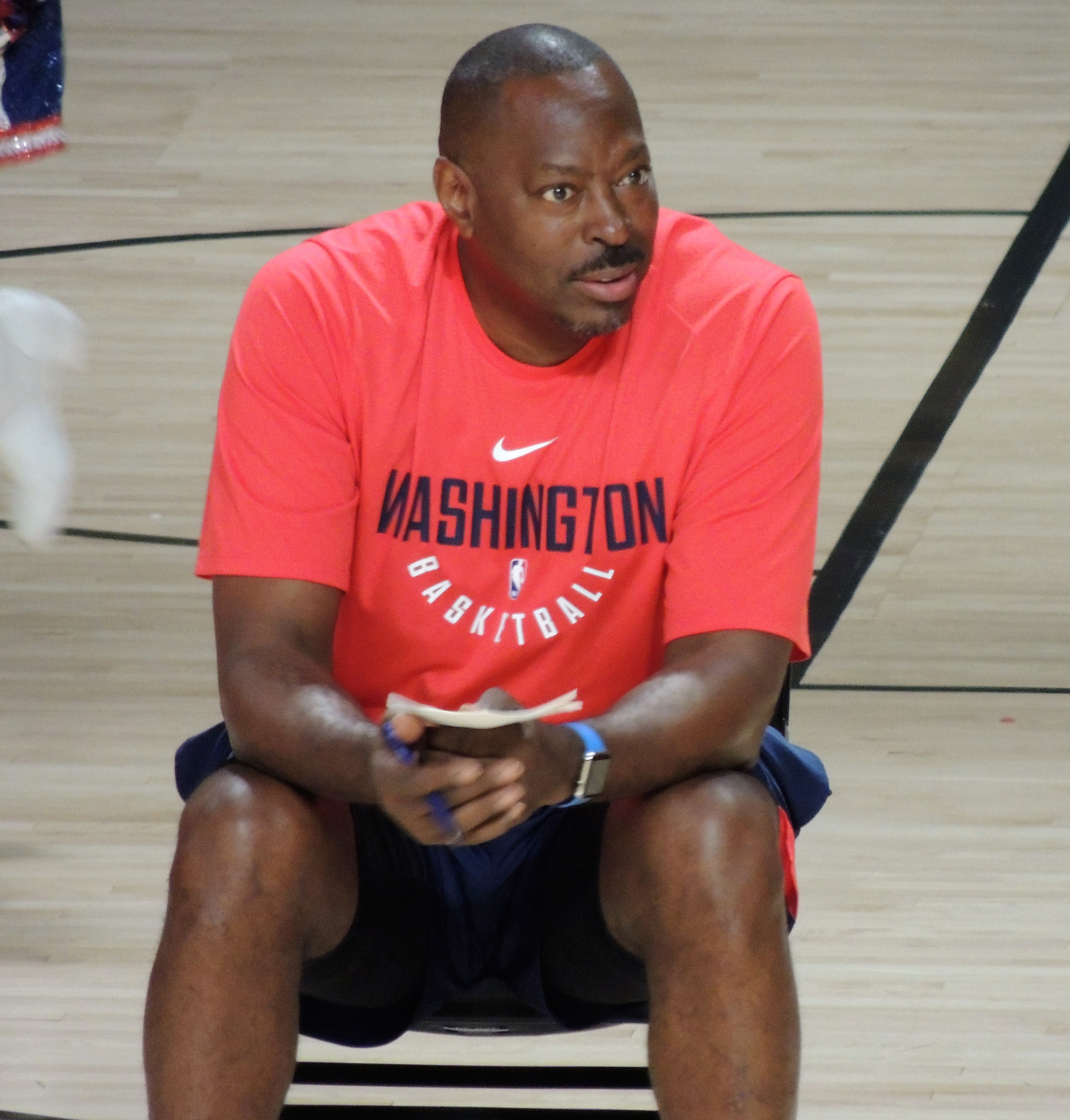
- Brown with the Washington Wizards in 2017

Personal information
- Born: July 29, 1960 (age 66) Chicago, Illinois, U.S.
- Listed height: 6 ft 6 in (1.98 m)
- Listed weight: 185 lb (84 kg)

Career information
- High school: Farragut Academy (Chicago)
- College: Arkansas (1978–1982)
- NBA draft: 1982: 4th round, 82nd overall pick
- Drafted by: New Jersey Nets
- Playing career: 1982–1994
- Position: Shooting guard / small forward
- Number: 8, 35, 21, 17
- Coaching career: 1997–present

Career history

Playing
- 1982–1983: Ohio Mixers
- 1984–1985: Indiana Pacers
- 1985–1986: Kansas City Sizzlers
- 1986: Chicago Bulls
- 1986–1987: New Jersey Nets
- 1988–1989: Houston Rockets
- 1989–1990: Milwaukee Bucks
- 1990: Los Angeles Lakers
- 1990: Albany Patroons
- 1990: Teorematur Arese
- 1991: Utah Jazz
- 1991–1992: Los Angeles Clippers
- 1992: Seattle SuperSonics
- 1992–1994: Reggio Emilia

Coaching
- 1997–2001: Portland Trail Blazers (assistant)
- 2001–2003: Detroit Pistons (assistant)
- 2003–2004: Toronto Raptors (assistant)
- 2004–2007: Boston Celtics (assistant)
- 2007–2008: Milwaukee Bucks (assistant)
- 2009–2010: Los Angeles Clippers (assistant)
- 2011–2014: Dallas Mavericks (assistant)
- 2014–2016: Brooklyn Nets (assistant)
- 2016: Brooklyn Nets (interim)
- 2016–2021: Washington Wizards (assistant)

Career highlights
- CBA All-Defensive Second Team (1983)
- Stats at NBA.com
- Stats at Basketball Reference

Anthony William Brown (born July 29, 1960) is an American professional basketball coach and former player. He formerly played in the NBA and internationally after a collegiate career with the Arkansas Razorbacks. Brown served as the interim head coach of the Brooklyn Nets in 2016.

== Playing career ==
The New Jersey Nets selected Brown in the fourth round of the 1982 NBA draft as the 82nd overall pick. He played for nine NBA teams in seven seasons and also played in the Continental Basketball Association (CBA) and overseas with Reggio Emilia in Italy from 1992 to 1994. Brown was selected to the CBA All-Defensive Second Team in 1983.

== NBA career statistics ==
Legend
GP	Games played	GS	Games started	MPG	Minutes per game
FG%	Field goal percentage	3P%	3-point field goal percentage	FT%	Free throw percentage
RPG	Rebounds per game	APG	Assists per game	SPG	Steals per game
BPG	Blocks per game	PPG	Points per game	**Bold**	Career high

=== Regular season ===
Year	Team	GP	GS	MPG	FG%	3P%	FT%	RPG	APG	SPG	BPG	PPG
1984–85	Indiana	**82**	36	19.3	.460	.000	.678	**3.5**	1.9	0.7	0.1	6.6
1985–86	Chicago	10	0	13.2	.439	.000	.692	1.6	1.4	0.5	0.1	4.5
1986–87	New Jersey	77	**67**	**30.4**	.442	.250	.738	2.8	**3.4**	**1.2**	**0.2**	**11.3**
1988–89	Houston	14	0	6.5	.311	.222	.750	1.1	0.4	0.2	0.0	2.6
1988–89	Milwaukee	29	0	9.4	.493	.286	.783	1.0	0.7	0.4	0.1	3.2
1989–90	Milwaukee	61	10	10.4	.427	.250	.679	1.2	0.7	0.5	0.1	3.6
1990–91	Los Angeles	7	0	3.9	**.667**	**1.000**	.000	0.6	0.4	0.0	0.0	0.7
1990–91	Utah	23	0	11.6	.364	.182	**.870**	1.7	0.6	0.2	0.0	3.4
1991–92	Los Angeles	22	0	11.5	.438	.318	.621	1.3	0.7	0.5	0.0	4.7
1991–92	Seattle	35	2	11.5	.394	.293	.811	1.6	0.9	0.5	0.1	4.8
Career		360	105	16.7	.437	.259	.719	2.1	1.6	0.7	0.1	6.0

=== Playoffs ===
Year	Team	GP	GS	MPG	FG%	3P%	FT%	RPG	APG	SPG	BPG	PPG
1988–89	Milwaukee	**6**	0	**11.5**	.364	.000	**.750**	**1.2**	**1.0**	0.3	0.0	1.8
1989–90	Milwaukee	2	0	6.5	.333	**1.000**	.000	0.0	0.0	**1.0**	0.0	1.5
1990–91	Utah	4	0	7.3	**.500**	.500	.000	0.8	0.3	0.0	0.0	**2.3**
1991–92	Seattle	5	0	4.4	.333	.250	.571	0.4	0.4	0.0	0.0	1.8
Career		17	0	7.8	.393	.375	.636	0.7	0.5	0.2	0.0	1.9

== Coaching career ==
After his playing career, Brown worked as an advance scout and college talent evaluator for the Milwaukee Bucks from 1994 to 1997. He has served as an assistant coach for the Portland Trail Blazers (1997–2001 under Mike Dunleavy), Detroit Pistons (2001–2003 under Rick Carlisle), and Toronto Raptors (2003–2004 under Kevin O'Neill).

On May 19, 2004, the Boston Celtics hired Brown to be an assistant under head coach Doc Rivers; The Boston Globe reported that Brown would be a "defensive coordinator" in Rivers's staff. Brown substituted for Rivers on March 19, 2006, as Rivers missed the day's game due to a death in the family. The Celtics defeated the Indiana Pacers 103–88. The Celtics led 72–71 after three quarters and opened the fourth with a 9–0 run with a lineup of reserve players Tony Allen, Gerald Green, Kendrick Perkins, Orien Greene, and Al Jefferson.

Brown returned to the Bucks at the start of the 2007–08 season to be an assistant this time under Larry Krystkowiak. On November 6, 2007, Brown took the helm as fill-in head coach of the Bucks in a 112–85 win over the Toronto Raptors as Krystkowiak missed the game due to his wife going into labor with twins.

The Los Angeles Clippers hired Brown as an assistant in 2009. Brown also filled in for injured Clippers head coach Mike Dunleavy on December 31, 2009, with Los Angeles beating Philadelphia 104–88.

On December 7, 2011, Brown replaced Dwane Casey as assistant coach to the Dallas Mavericks. This was Brown's second time working under Rick Carlisle.

For the 2014–15 season, Brown was hired by the Brooklyn Nets as an assistant to new head coach Lionel Hollins. He took over as interim head coach after Hollins was fired. On April 18, 2016, he was relieved of the position when the Brooklyn Nets named head coach Kenny Atkinson

== Head coaching record ==
Legend
Regular season	G	Games coached	W	Games won	L	Games lost	W–L %	Win–loss %
Playoffs	PG	Playoff games	PW	Playoff wins	PL	Playoff losses	PW–L %	Playoff win–loss %

Team	Year	G	W	L	W–L%	Finish	PG	PW	PL	PW–L%	Result
Brooklyn	2015–16	45	11	34	.244	4th in Atlantic	—	—	—	—	Missed playoffs
Career		45	11	34	.244		—	—	—	—	
