= Tito Horford =

Dominican basketball player (born 1966)

Personal information
- Born: January 19, 1966 (age 60) La Romana, Dominican Republic
- Listed height: 7 ft 1 in (2.16 m)
- Listed weight: 245 lb (111 kg)

Career information
- High school: Marian Christian (Houston, Texas)
- College: Miami (Florida) (1986–1988)
- NBA draft: 1988: 2nd round, 39th overall pick
- Drafted by: Milwaukee Bucks
- Playing career: 1988–1994
- Position: Center
- Number: 50, 42

Career history
- 1982–1985: Naco
- 1988: San Lázaro
- 1988–1990: Milwaukee Bucks
- 1990: Los Prados
- 1990–1991: AS Monaco
- 1992: Majestic Firenze
- 1992: Guaiqueríes de Margarita
- 1993: Los Prados
- 1993: Washington Bullets
- 1993–1994: Sioux Falls Skyforce
- 1994: Los Prados
- 1994–1995: Sírio
- 1995: Los Prados
- 1995–1997: Suzano
- 1997: Fontanafredda Siena
- 2000: Garzas de Plata de la UAEH
- 2000: Tribu de Quisqueya
- 2001: Calero de Villa Duarte
- 2000: Garzas de Plata de la UAEH
- 2001: Metropolitanos de Mauricio Baez
- 2001–2002: Los Prados
- 2003–2004: San Carlos

Career highlights
- LNBP All-Star (2001); First-team Parade All-American (1985); McDonald's All-American (1985)
- Stats at NBA.com
- Stats at Basketball Reference

Alfredo William "Tito" Horford (born January 19, 1966) is a Dominican former professional basketball player who was selected by the Milwaukee Bucks in the second round (39th pick overall) of the 1988 NBA draft. Horford played three years in the National Basketball Association (NBA), two with the Bucks from 1988 to 1990, and a short stint with the Washington Bullets during the 1993–94 season. He played in Spain in 1992. He was listed on the Bucks' summer 1992 roster.

== Early years ==
Tito Horford was born in La Romana, Dominican Republic. Ana Graciela Baltazar is his mother. His father was a Bahamian immigrant. Horford was born two months premature and his small size led to his nickname "Tito". He attended Marian Christian High School (closed in 1989) in Houston which originally recruited him from the Dominican Republic. After high school, Horford enrolled at the University of Houston, when he was ruled ineligible. He then went to Louisiana State University before being kicked off the team. He then played at University of Miami.

== Career ==
In 1981, Horford was a promising pitcher, but had grown to 6 foot 10 by 15 years old, and believed he was too tall for a pitcher. Then advised by Eduardo Gomez, who supervised a sports program in La Romana, he took up basketball. In the summer of 1982, he moved to Santo Domingo to play for the Naco Athletic Club’s entry in the Dominican Basketball Federation, which led to his joining Marian Christian High School in September 1982. Later, he was enrolled in three universities and was also involved in an NCAA investigation as a witness.

In 1988, he was drafted by the Milwaukee Bucks with the 39th pick of the 1988 NBA draft and Tito Horford became the first Dominican-born player to play in the NBA after he made his NBA debut on November 8, 1988. He spent the 1988–89 and ’89–90 seasons with the Milwaukee Bucks. In October 1990, he was waived by Buck and signed a contract with Orlando Magic on September 1 1991 and was waived on October 9 after one month and nine days. Before joining Washington Bullets, he spent three seasons in France, Venezuela, Italy and Brazil.

Then, he signed a contract with Bullets October 5, 1993. After he had a three-game stint, the Washington Bullets waived him on November 15, 1993. He did not play NBA again. Horford then travelled the world to play basketball in France and Italy while also playing in the Dominican semi-pro leagues, as well as for the national team.

== Career statistics ==
Legend
GP	Games played	GS	Games started	MPG	Minutes per game
FG%	Field goal percentage	3P%	3-point field goal percentage	FT%	Free throw percentage
RPG	Rebounds per game	APG	Assists per game	SPG	Steals per game
BPG	Blocks per game	PPG	Points per game	**Bold**	Career high

=== Regular season ===
Year	Team	GP	GS	MPG	FG%	3P%	FT%	RPG	APG	SPG	BPG	PPG
1988–89	Milwaukee	25	0	4.5	**.326**	.000	**.632**	0.9	**0.1**	0.0	0.3	**1.7**
1989–90	Milwaukee	**35**	0	6.7	.290	.000	.625	**1.7**	**0.1**	0.1	0.5	1.5
1993–94	Washington	3	0	**9.3**	.000	.000	.000	1.0	0.0	**0.3**	**1.0**	0.0
Career		63	0	6.0	.300	.000	.628	1.3	0.1	0.1	0.4	1.5

=== Playoffs ===
Year	Team	GP	GS	MPG	FG%	3P%	FT%	RPG	APG	SPG	BPG	PPG
1990	Milwaukee	2	0	1.0	1.000	.000	.000	0.0	0.0	0.0	0.0	1.0

== Personal life ==
After retiring from basketball, Horford settled in Lansing, Michigan. He married his long time girlfriend, Arelis Reynoso, a sports journalist.

His son, Al Horford, went to the University of Florida and played a prominent role on the Gators team that won the national championship in 2006 and 2007. He was selected third overall by the Atlanta Hawks in the 2007 NBA draft, and has gone on to be a five-time All-Star and NBA champion during his career.

His other son, Jon Horford, played as a forward for the University of Michigan basketball team. He then transferred to Florida after his junior season.

His youngest daughter, Maíra Horford, is a Brazilian professional basketball player. Now 28 years old, she plays at Unimed Campinas. She has played for Miralvalle, San Lazaro, San Jose, Sport, Ituano and Sesi Araraquara. In the current Campeonato Brasileiro de Basquete Feminino season, she has played 8 games and averaged 11.5 points and 4.9 rebounds.

His brother, Kelly Horford, played at Florida Atlantic University from 1992 to 1996.

== See also ==
- List of Afro-Latinos
