= Frank Kornet =

American basketball player

Personal information
- Born: January 27, 1967 (age 59) Lexington, Kentucky, U.S.
- Listed height: 6 ft 9 in (2.06 m)
- Listed weight: 225 lb (102 kg)

Career information
- High school: Lexington Catholic (Lexington, Kentucky)
- College: Vanderbilt (1985–1989)
- NBA draft: 1989: 2nd round, 30th overall pick
- Drafted by: Milwaukee Bucks
- Playing career: 1989–1994
- Position: Power forward
- Number: 8

Career history
- 1989–1991: Milwaukee Bucks
- 1991–1992: Ticino Assicurazioni Siena
- 1992–1993: Fort Wayne Fury
- 1993: Panasonic Reggio Calabria
- 1993–1994: Rochester Renegade

Career highlights
- Second-team All-SEC (1989)
- Stats at NBA.com
- Stats at Basketball Reference

Francis Milton Kornet (born January 27, 1967) is an American former professional basketball player who was selected by the Milwaukee Bucks in the second round (30th overall) of the 1989 NBA draft. Kornet played two seasons in the NBA, both with the Bucks. In his NBA career, he appeared in a total of 89 games and averaged 1.9 ppg. He graduated from Lexington Catholic High School and played collegiately at Vanderbilt University from 1985 to 1989. He was named all-Southeastern Conference in his senior year.

Kornet is married to five-time Emmy Award winning Nashville television news anchor Tracy Kornet. He has three children: Nicole played basketball at Oklahoma and UCLA; Luke followed in his father's footsteps in playing at Vanderbilt and now plays in the NBA for the San Antonio Spurs; and John.

== NBA career statistics ==
Legend
GP	Games played	GS	Games started	MPG	Minutes per game
FG%	Field goal percentage	3P%	3-point field goal percentage	FT%	Free throw percentage
RPG	Rebounds per game	APG	Assists per game	SPG	Steals per game
BPG	Blocks per game	PPG	Points per game	**Bold**	Career high

=== Regular season ===
Year	Team	GP	GS	MPG	FG%	3P%	FT%	RPG	APG	SPG	BPG	PPG
1989–90	Milwaukee	**57**	0	**7.7**	.368	.250	**.615**	**1.2**	**0.4**	**0.2**	**0.1**	**2.0**
1990–91	Milwaukee	32	0	4.9	**.371**	**.278**	.538	0.8	0.3	**0.2**	0.0	1.8
Career		89	0	6.7	.369	.263	.596	1.1	0.3	0.2	0.0	1.9

=== Playoffs ===
Year	Team	GP	GS	MPG	FG%	3P%	FT%	RPG	APG	SPG	BPG	PPG
1989–90	Milwaukee	2	0	2.0	.000	.000	.000	0.5	0.0	0.0	0.0	0.0
