= 1989–90 Milwaukee Bucks season =

NBA professional basketball team season

- Head coach: Del Harris
- General manager: Del Harris
- Owner: Herb Kohl
- Arena: Bradley Center

Results
- Record: 44–38 (.537)
- Place: Division: 3rd (Central); Conference: 6th (Eastern)
- Playoff finish: First round (lost to Bulls 1–3)
- Stats at Basketball Reference

Local media
- Television: WCGV-TV
- Radio: WTMJ

The 1989–90 Milwaukee Bucks season was the 22nd season for the Milwaukee Bucks in the National Basketball Association. For the first time since the 1978–79 season, Sidney Moncrief was not on the team's opening day roster.

== Season summary ==
=== Off-season ===
During the off-season, the Bucks acquired All-Star guard Alvin Robertson and Greg Anderson from the San Antonio Spurs.

=== Regular season ===
With the addition of Robertson and Anderson, the Bucks played below .500 in winning percentage with a 10–13 start to the regular season. However, the team won 13 of their next 16 games, and held a 27–22 record at the All-Star break. At mid-season, the team traded Randy Breuer to the expansion Minnesota Timberwolves in exchange for Brad Lohaus. Despite a six-game losing streak in March, the Bucks finished in third place in the Central Division with a 44–38 record, and earned the sixth seed in the Eastern Conference; the team qualified for the NBA playoffs for the eleventh consecutive year.

Ricky Pierce led the Bucks in scoring, averaging 23.0 points per game off the bench, and was named the NBA Sixth Man of the Year, despite only playing 59 games due to a wrist injury, while Jay Humphries averaged 15.3 points, 5.8 assists and 1.9 steals per game, and Robertson provided the team with 14.2 points, 6.9 rebounds, 5.5 assists and 2.6 steals per game, and was named to the NBA All-Defensive Second Team. In addition, Jack Sikma provided with 13.9 points and 6.9 rebounds per game, while Paul Pressey contributed 11.0 points, 4.3 assists and 1.2 steals per game off the bench, and Fred Roberts averaged 10.5 points per game. Meanwhile, Anderson averaged 8.8 points and 6.2 rebounds per game, second-year guard Jeff Grayer contributed 7.7 points per game, and Larry Krystkowiak provided with 7.0 points and 4.8 rebounds per game, but only played just 16 games due to injury.

Robertson finished tied in fifth place in Defensive Player of the Year voting, while head coach Del Harris finished tied in seventh place in Coach of the Year voting. The Bucks finished tenth in the NBA in home-game attendance, with an attendance of 659,602 at the Bradley Center during the regular season.

=== NBA playoffs ===
In the Eastern Conference First Round of the 1990 NBA playoffs, the Bucks faced off against the 3rd–seeded Chicago Bulls, who were led by the trio of All-Star guard Michael Jordan, All-Star forward Scottie Pippen, and Horace Grant. The Bucks lost the first two games to the Bulls on the road at the Chicago Stadium, but managed to win Game 3 at home, 119–112 at the Bradley Center, in which Robertson scored 38 points. However, the Bucks lost Game 4 to the Bulls at home, 110–86, thus losing the series in four games.

=== Notable highlights ===
One notable highlight of the regular season occurred on November 9, 1989, in which the Bucks defeated the Seattle SuperSonics at home in a quintuple-overtime game, 155–154 at the Bradley Center. Pierce led the team with 36 points off the bench, while Robertson finished with 28 points and 7 steals, and Sikma added 23 points and 8 rebounds.

=== Aftermath ===
Following the season, Pressey was traded to the San Antonio Spurs.

== Draft picks ==
Round	Pick	Player	Position	Nationality	College
2	30	Frank Kornet	PF	United States	Vanderbilt

== Roster ==
1989–90 Milwaukee Bucks roster
Players

Pos.	No.	Player	Height	Weight	DOB	From
F	34	Cadillac Anderson	6 ft 10 in (2.08 m)	230 lb (104 kg)	1964–06–22	Houston
F	35	Tony Brown	6 ft 6 in (1.98 m)	185 lb (84 kg)	1960–07–29	Arkansas
F	54	Ben Coleman	6 ft 9 in (2.06 m)	235 lb (107 kg)	1961–11–14	Maryland
G	20	Jeff Grayer	6 ft 5 in (1.96 m)	200 lb (91 kg)	1965–12–17	Iowa State
C	50	Tito Horford	7 ft 1 in (2.16 m)	245 lb (111 kg)	1966–01–19	Miami (FL)
G	24	Jay Humphries	6 ft 3 in (1.91 m)	185 lb (84 kg)	1962–10–17	Colorado
F	8	Frank Kornet	6 ft 9 in (2.06 m)	225 lb (102 kg)	1967–01–27	Vanderbilt
F	42	Larry Krystkowiak (injured)	6 ft 9 in (2.06 m)	220 lb (100 kg)	1964–09–23	Montana
F	44	Brad Lohaus	6 ft 11 in (2.11 m)	230 lb (104 kg)	1964–09–29	Iowa
G	22	Ricky Pierce	6 ft 4 in (1.93 m)	205 lb (93 kg)	1959–08–19	Rice
F	25	Paul Pressey	6 ft 5 in (1.96 m)	185 lb (84 kg)	1958–12–24	Tulsa
F	31	Fred Roberts	6 ft 10 in (2.08 m)	218 lb (99 kg)	1960–08–14	BYU
G	21	Alvin Robertson	6 ft 3 in (1.91 m)	185 lb (84 kg)	1962–07–22	Arkansas
C	43	Jack Sikma	6 ft 11 in (2.11 m)	230 lb (104 kg)	1955–11–14	Illinois Wesleyan

Coaches
Head coach
- Del Harris
Assistant(s)
- Mack Calvin
- Mike Dunleavy, Sr.
- Frank Hamblen

Legend
- (DP) Unsigned draft pick
- (FA) Free agent
- (S) Suspended
- Injured

== Regular season ==
=== Season standings ===
Central Division	W	L	PCT	GB	Home	Road	Div
y-Detroit Pistons	59	23	.720	–	35–6	24–17	22–8
x-Chicago Bulls	55	27	.671	4	36–5	19–22	20–10
x-Milwaukee Bucks	44	38	.537	15	27–14	17–24	14–16
x-Cleveland Cavaliers	42	40	.512	17	27–14	15–26	14–16
x-Indiana Pacers	42	40	.512	17	28–13	14–27	16–14
Atlanta Hawks	41	41	.500	18	25–16	16–25	15–15
Orlando Magic	18	64	.220	41	12–29	6–35	4–26

#	Eastern Conference				
#	Team	W	L	PCT	GB
1	c-Detroit Pistons	59	23	.720	–
2	y-Philadelphia 76ers	53	29	.646	6
3	x-Chicago Bulls	55	27	.671	4
4	x-Boston Celtics	52	30	.634	7
5	x-New York Knicks	45	37	.549	14
6	x-Milwaukee Bucks	44	38	.537	15
7	x-Cleveland Cavaliers	42	40	.512	17
8	x-Indiana Pacers	42	40	.512	17
9	Atlanta Hawks	41	41	.500	18
10	Washington Bullets	31	51	.378	28
11	Miami Heat	18	64	.220	41
12	Orlando Magic	18	64	.220	41
13	New Jersey Nets	17	65	.207	42

z - clinched division title
y - clinched division title
x - clinched playoff spot

=== Game log ===
1989–90 game log
Total: 44–38 (home: 27–14; road: 17–24)
November: 7–7 (home: 5–2; road: 2–5)

Game	Date	Team	Score	High points	High rebounds	High assists	Location Attendance	Record
1	November 3, 1989	@ Boston	L 114–127	Ricky Pierce (35)			Boston Garden; 14,890	0–1
2	November 4, 1989	@ Philadelphia	W 102–96	Paul Pressey (21)			The Spectrum; 13,893	1–1
3	November 7, 1989	Boston	W 106–100	Fred Roberts (26)			Bradley Center; 15,079	2–1
4	November 9, 1989	Seattle	W 155–154 5OT	Ricky Pierce (36)	Randy Breuer, Ben Coleman (9)	Jay Humphries (10)	Bradley Center; 14,012	3–1
5	November 11, 1989	Philadelphia	L 96–104				Bradley Center; 17,465	3–2
6	November 14, 1989	San Antonio	W 108–97				Bradley Center; 14,120	4–2
7	November 16, 1989	Orlando	W 132–113				Bradley Center; 13,298	5–2
8	November 17, 1989	@ Detroit	L 79–106				The Palace of Auburn Hills; 21,454	5–3
9	November 21, 1989	@ Washington	L 91–97				Capital Centre; 11,721	5–4
10	November 22, 1989	Atlanta	W 118–100				Bradley Center; 15,124	6–4
11	November 25, 1989	@ New York	L 108–125				Madison Square Garden; 18,212	6–5
12	November 27, 1989	Indiana	L 97–101				Bradley Center; 15,124	6–6
13	November 29, 1989	@ L. A. Clippers	W 117–103				Los Angeles Memorial Sports Arena; 12,306	7–6
14	November 30, 1989	@ Denver	L 102–103				McNichols Sports Arena; 8,727	7–7

December: 8–6 (home: 5–2; road: 3–4)

Game	Date	Team	Score	High points	High rebounds	High assists	Location Attendance	Record
15	December 2, 1989	@ Golden State	L 98–101				Oakland-Alameda County Coliseum Arena; 15,025	7–8
16	December 5, 1989	@ Sacramento	L 103–118				ARCO Arena; 17,014	7–9
17	December 8, 1989	@ Phoenix	L 103–118				Arizona Veterans Memorial Coliseum; 12,409	7–10
18	December 10, 1989	Portland	L 103–118				Bradley Center; 15,124	8–10
19	December 12, 1989	Orlando	W 106–103				Bradley Center; 14,276	9–10
20	December 13, 1989	@ Cleveland	L 93–99				Coliseum at Richfield; 13,331	9–11
20	December 15, 1989	@ Indiana	W 103–98				Market Square Arena; 10,495	10–11
21	December 16, 1989	Miami	L 96–99				Bradley Center; 15,715	10–12
22	December 19, 1989	Boston	L 86–95				Bradley Center; 15,182	10–13
24	December 22, 1989	Cleveland	W 112–100				Bradley Center; 17,854	11–13
25	December 23, 1989	@ Minnesota	W 94–90				Hubert H. Humphrey Metrodome; 23,249	12–13
26	December 26, 1989	Houston	W 103–96				Bradley Center; 15,945	13–13
27	December 29, 1989	@ Detroit	W 99–85				The Palace of Auburn Hills; 21,454	14–13
28	December 30, 1989	Minnesota	W 109–99				Bradley Center; 17,924	15–13

January: 10–6 (home: 6–1; road: 4–5)

Game	Date	Team	Score	High points	High rebounds	High assists	Location Attendance	Record
29	January 2, 1990	@ Atlanta	L 107–113				Omni Coliseum; 11,676	15–14
30	January 3, 1990	@ New Jersey	W 110–96				Brendan Byrne Arena; 6,890	16–14
31	January 6, 1990	Chicago	W 118–111				Bradley Center; 18,633	17–14
32	January 8, 1990	Charlotte	W 126–113				Bradley Center; 14,178	18–14
33	January 10, 1990	@ Cleveland	W 116–100				Coliseum at Richfield; 15,369	19–14
34	January 12, 1990	L. A. Clippers	L 94–95				Bradley Center; 17,901	19–15
35	January 13, 1990	@ Indiana	L 109–111				Market Square Arena; 12,180	19–16
36	January 16, 1990	Golden State	W 134–126				Bradley Center; 18,633	20–16
37	January 18, 1990	@ Washington	W 115–112				Capital Centre; 12,414	21–16
38	January 19, 1990	L. A. Lakers	W 103–102				Bradley Center; 18,633	22–16
39	January 21, 1990	Miami	W 123–101				Bradley Center; 15,017	23–16
40	January 23, 1990	@ Portland	L 90–119				Memorial Coliseum; 12,884	23–17
41	January 24, 1990	@ Seattle	W 119–112				Seattle Center Coliseum; 10,903	24–17
42	January 26, 1990	@ L. A. Lakers	L 91–100				Great Western Forum; 17,505	24–18
43	January 27, 1990	@ Utah	L 96–144				Salt Palace; 12,616	24–19
44	January 30, 1990	Sacramento	W 109–102				Bradley Center; 13,682	25–19

February: 2–0 (home: 2–0; road: 0–0)

Game	Date	Team	Score	High points	High rebounds	High assists	Location Attendance	Record
45	February 1, 1990	Orlando	W 129–111				Bradley Center; 14,113	26–19
46	February 2, 1990	@ Philadelphia	L 109–119				The Spectrum; 15,383	26–20
47	February 4, 1990	Philadelphia	L 102–105				Bradley Center; 17,964	26–21
48	February 6, 1990	@ Boston	W 119–106				Hartford Civic Center; 15,239	27–21
49	February 8, 1990	Detroit	L 101–104				Bradley Center; 17,204	27–22
50	February 14, 1990	Denver	W 127–117				Bradley Center; 13,829	28–22
51	February 18, 1990	Chicago	L 88–111				Bradley Center; 18,633	28–23
52	February 20, 1990	New Jersey	W 106–103				Bradley Center; 14,065	29–23
53	February 22, 1990	Dallas	W 109–97				Bradley Center; 15,136	30–23

March: 0–0 (home: 0–0; road: 0–0)

Game	Date	Team	Score	High points	High rebounds	High assists	Location Attendance	Record

April: 0–0 (home: 0–0; road: 0–0)

Game	Date	Team	Score	High points	High rebounds	High assists	Location Attendance	Record

1989–90 schedule

== Playoffs ==
1990 playoff game log
First Round: 1–3 (home: 1–1; road: 0–2)

Game	Date	Team	Score	High points	High rebounds	High assists	Location Attendance	Series
1	April 27	@ Chicago	L 97–111	Alvin Robertson (22)	Brad Lohaus (7)	Jay Humphries (12)	Chicago Stadium; 18,676	0–1
2	April 29	@ Chicago	L 101–109	Paul Pressey (25)	Greg Anderson (10)	Paul Pressey (12)	Chicago Stadium; 18,676	0–2
3	May 1	Chicago	W 119–112	Alvin Robertson (38)	Alvin Robertson (8)	Paul Pressey (12)	Bradley Center; 18,575	1–2
4	May 3	Chicago	L 86–110	Alvin Robertson (20)	Lohaus, Anderson (8)	Alvin Robertson (4)	Bradley Center; 18,633	1–3

1990 schedule

== Player statistics ==
Legend
GP	Games played	GS	Games started	MPG	Minutes per game
FG%	Field-goal percentage	3P%	3-point field-goal percentage	FT%	Free-throw percentage
RPG	Rebounds per game	APG	Assists per game	SPG	Steals per game
BPG	Blocks per game	PPG	Points per game

=== Season ===
Player	GP	GS	MPG	FG%	3FG%	FT%	RPG	APG	SPG	BPG	PPG
Ricky Pierce	59	0	29.0	51.0	34.6	83.9	2.8	2.3	0.8	0.1	23.0
Jay Humphries	81	81	34.8	49.4	30.0	78.6	3.3	5.8	1.9	0.1	15.3
Alvin Robertson	81	81	32.1	50.3	15.4	74.1	6.9	5.5	2.6	0.2	14.2
Jack Sikma	71	70	31.7	41.6	34.2	88.5	6.9	3.2	1.1	0.7	13.9
Paul Pressey	57	2	24.6	47.2	14.0	75.8	3.0	4.3	1.2	0.4	11.0
Fred Roberts	82	66	27.3	49.5	18.2	78.3	3.8	1.8	0.7	0.3	10.5
Brad Lohaus	52	17	26.0	45.8	38.0	70.1	5.5	2.0	0.8	1.3	10.0
Greg Anderson	60	28	21.5	50.7	0.0	53.5	6.2	0.4	0.5	0.9	8.8
Jeff Grayer	71	40	20.1	46.0	12.5	65.1	3.1	1.5	0.7	0.1	7.7
Larry Krystkowiak	16	7	23.8	36.4	0.0	78.8	4.8	1.6	0.6	0.1	7.0
Randy Breuer	30	8	18.5	46.2	0.0	62.7	4.2	0.4	0.3	1.1	6.8
Ben Coleman	22	0	13.9	47.4	0.0	82.9	4.0	0.5	0.3	0.3	5.7
Tony Brown	61	10	10.4	42.7	25.0	67.9	1.2	0.7	0.5	0.1	3.6
Mike Dunleavy	5	0	8.6	28.6	22.2	87.5	0.4	2.0	0.2	0.0	3.4
Jerry Sichting	1	0	27.0	0.0	0.0	75.0	0.0	2.0	0.0	0.0	3.0
Gerald Henderson	11	0	11.7	42.3	42.9	100.0	1.1	1.2	0.7	0.0	2.5
Frank Kornet	57	0	7.7	36.8	25.0	61.5	1.2	0.4	0.2	0.1	2.0
Tito Horford	35	0	6.7	29.0	0.0	62.5	1.7	0.1	0.1	0.5	1.5

=== Playoffs ===
Player	GP	GS	MPG	FG%	3FG%	FT%	RPG	APG	SPG	BPG	PPG
Alvin Robertson	4	4	38.8	52.2	0.0	70.6	5.8	4.8	2.3	0.0	23.5
Ricky Pierce	4	0	30.5	46.7	50.0	90.3	2.3	1.5	1.3	0.0	22.3
Paul Pressey	4	2	32.3	43.2	0.0	80.8	5.3	7.5	1.5	0.3	14.8
Fred Roberts	4	4	19.8	65.0	0.0	81.3	2.0	0.8	0.0	0.3	9.8
Brad Lohaus	4	4	36.8	40.0	37.5	0.0	6.8	1.3	2.0	2.3	9.5
Jay Humphries	3	2	26.3	53.3	33.3	76.9	1.7	6.3	1.0	0.0	9.0
Greg Anderson	4	0	25.3	68.4	0.0	50.0	6.0	0.0	0.3	1.0	8.3
Jack Sikma	4	4	29.3	26.1	28.6	75.0	3.5	1.8	0.5	1.0	5.0
Tony Brown	2	0	6.5	33.3	100.0	0.0	0.0	0.0	1.0	0.0	1.5
Tito Horford	2	0	1.0	100.0	0.0	0.0	0.0	0.0	0.0	0.0	1.0
Jeff Grayer	4	0	3.0	0.0	0.0	0.0	0.5	0.3	0.0	0.0	0.0
Frank Kornet	2	0	2.0	0.0	0.0	0.0	0.5	0.0	0.0	0.0	0.0

Player statistics citation:

== Awards and records ==
- Ricky Pierce, NBA Sixth Man of the Year Award
- Alvin Robertson, NBA All-Defensive Second Team

== Transactions ==
=== Trades ===
May 28, 1989
To Milwaukee Bucks----
- Cadillac Anderson
- Alvin Robertson
- 1989 2nd round pick (Frank Kornet)
To San Antonio Spurs----
- Terry Cummings
October 26, 1989
To Milwaukee Bucks----
- Pat Durham
To Dallas Mavericks----
- 1993 2nd round draft pick (Eric Riley)
January 4, 1990
To Milwaukee Bucks----
- Brad Lohaus
- 1992 2nd round draft pick (Duane Cooper)
To Minnesota Timberwolves----
- Randy Breuer
- 1992 2nd round draft pick (Chris Smith)

=== Free agents ===
Player	Signed	Former team
Gerald Henderson	October 6, 1989	Philadelphia 76ers
Ben Coleman	October 18, 1989	Philadelphia 76ers
Jerry Sichting	February 27, 1989	Charlotte Hornets

Subtractions
Player	Date signed	New team
Mark Davis	Expansion Draft June 15, 1989	Minnesota Timberwolves
Paul Mokeski	September 26, 1989	Cleveland Cavaliers

Player Transactions Citation:

== See also ==
- 1989-90 NBA season
