= 1989–90 Detroit Pistons season =

NBA team season

- NBA champions
- Conference champions
- Division champions
- Head coach: Chuck Daly
- General manager: Jack McCloskey
- Owners: William Davidson
- Arena: The Palace of Auburn Hills

Results
- Record: 59–23 (.720)
- Place: Division: 1st (Central); Conference: 1st (Eastern)
- Playoff finish: NBA champions (Defeated Trail Blazers 4–1)
- Stats at Basketball Reference

Local media
- Television: WKBD-TV; PASS Sports
- Radio: WWJ

The 1989–90 Detroit Pistons season was the 42nd season for the Detroit Pistons in the National Basketball Association, and their 33rd season in Detroit, Michigan. The Pistons entered the regular season as the defending NBA champions, after defeating the Los Angeles Lakers in a four-game sweep in the 1989 NBA Finals, winning their first ever NBA championship.

== Season summary ==
=== Regular season ===
As the defending champions, the Pistons got off to a 13–10 start to the regular season, but then won ten of their next eleven games, and later on held a 35–14 record at the All-Star break. The team posted a 13-game winning streak between January and February, and then posted a 12-game winning streak between February and March. The Pistons finished in first place in the Central Division with a 59–23 record, and earned the first seed in the Eastern Conference; the team qualified for the NBA playoffs for the seventh consecutive year.

Isiah Thomas averaged 18.4 points, 9.4 assists and 1.7 steals per game, while Joe Dumars averaged 17.8 points and 4.9 assists per game, and was named to the All-NBA Third Team, and James Edwards provided the team with 14.5 points and 4.2 rebounds per game. In addition, Mark Aguirre contributed 14.1 points per game, while Bill Laimbeer provided with 12.1 points and 9.6 rebounds per game, and Vinnie Johnson contributed 9.8 points and 3.1 assists per game. Meanwhile, Dennis Rodman averaged 8.8 points and 9.7 rebounds per game, and was named the NBA Defensive Player of the Year, and John Salley provided with 7.2 points, 5.4 rebounds and 1.9 blocks per game.

During the NBA All-Star weekend at the Miami Arena in Miami, Florida, Thomas, Dumars and Rodman were all selected for the 1990 NBA All-Star Game, as members of the Eastern Conference All-Star team, while head coach Chuck Daly was selected to coach the Eastern Conference; it was the first ever All-Star appearance for both Dumars and Rodman. Dumars and Rodman were also both named to the NBA All-Defensive First Team; Thomas and Dumars both finished tied in 13th place in Most Valuable Player voting, while Dumars also finished tied in third place in Defensive Player of the Year voting, and Daly finished in fourth place in Coach of the Year voting.

The Pistons finished third in the NBA in home-game attendance, with an attendance of 879,705 at The Palace of Auburn Hills during the regular season.

=== NBA playoffs ===
In the Eastern Conference First Round of the 1990 NBA playoffs, the Pistons faced off against the 8th–seeded Indiana Pacers, a team that featured All-Star guard Reggie Miller, Chuck Person, and sixth man Detlef Schrempf. The Pistons won the first two games over the Pacers at home at The Palace of Auburn Hills, before winning Game 3 on the road, 108–96 at the Market Square Arena to win the series in a three-game sweep.

In the Eastern Conference Semi-finals, the team faced off against the 5th–seeded New York Knicks, a team that featured All-Star center Patrick Ewing, Charles Oakley and Maurice Cheeks. The Pistons took a 2–0 series lead before losing Game 3 to the Knicks on the road, 111–103 at Madison Square Garden. The Pistons managed to win the next two games, which included a Game 5 win over the Knicks at The Palace of Auburn Hills, 95–84 to win the series in five games.

In the Eastern Conference Finals, and for the third consecutive year, the Pistons faced off against the 3rd–seeded Chicago Bulls, who were led by the trio of All-Star guard Michael Jordan, All-Star forward Scottie Pippen, and Horace Grant. The Pistons won the first two games over the Bulls at The Palace of Auburn Hills, before losing the next two games on the road at the Chicago Stadium, as the Bulls evened the series. After winning Game 5 at The Palace of Auburn Hills, 97–83, the Pistons lost Game 6 to the Bulls at the Chicago Stadium, 109–91. With the series tied at 3–3, the Pistons won Game 7 over the Bulls at The Palace of Auburn Hills, 93–74 to win in a hard-fought seven-game series, and advance to the NBA Finals for the third consecutive year.

In the 1990 NBA Finals, the Pistons faced off against the 3rd–seeded Portland Trail Blazers, who were led by the trio of All-Star guard Clyde Drexler, Terry Porter, and All-Star center Kevin Duckworth. The Pistons won Game 1 over the Trail Blazers at home, 105–99 at The Palace of Auburn Hills, but then lost Game 2 at home in overtime, 106–105 as the Trail Blazers evened the series. The Pistons managed to win the next three games on the road, including a Game 5 win over the Trail Blazers at the Memorial Coliseum, 92–90 to win the series in five games, and win their second consecutive NBA championship, as Thomas was named the NBA Finals Most Valuable Player.

=== Aftermath ===
The Pistons would not reach the NBA Finals again until 2004, in which they won the Finals in five games against their heavily favored rivals, the Los Angeles Lakers to win their third NBA championship.

== Roster ==
1989–90 Detroit Pistons roster
Players

Pos.	No.	Player	Height	Weight	DOB	From
G/F	23	Mark Aguirre	6 ft 6 in (1.98 m)	232 lb (105 kg)	1959–12–10	DePaul
C	00	William Bedford	7 ft 0 in (2.13 m)	225 lb (102 kg)	1963–12–14	Memphis
G	4	Joe Dumars	6 ft 3 in (1.91 m)	190 lb (86 kg)	1963–05–24	McNeese State
C	53	James Edwards	7 ft 1 in (2.16 m)	225 lb (102 kg)	1955–11–22	Washington
F	33	Dave Greenwood	6 ft 9 in (2.06 m)	222 lb (101 kg)	1957–05–27	UCLA
F	35	Scott Hastings	6 ft 10 in (2.08 m)	235 lb (107 kg)	1960–06–03	Arkansas
G	12	Gerald Henderson	6 ft 2 in (1.88 m)	175 lb (79 kg)	1956–01–16	VCU
G	15	Vinnie Johnson	6 ft 2 in (1.88 m)	200 lb (91 kg)	1956–09–01	Baylor
F/C	40	Bill Laimbeer	6 ft 11 in (2.11 m)	245 lb (111 kg)	1957–05–19	Notre Dame
F	10	Dennis Rodman	6 ft 8 in (2.03 m)	210 lb (95 kg)	1961–05–13	SE Oklahoma State
F/C	22	John Salley	6 ft 11 in (2.11 m)	230 lb (104 kg)	1964–05–16	Georgia Tech
G	11	Isiah Thomas	6 ft 1 in (1.85 m)	180 lb (82 kg)	1961–04–30	Indiana

Coaches
Head coach
- Chuck Daly
Assistant(s)
- Brendan Malone
- Brendan Suhr
- Mike Abdenour (trainer)

Legend
- (DP) Unsigned draft pick
- (FA) Free agent
- (S) Suspended
- Injured

== Regular season ==
=== Season standings ===
Central Division	W	L	PCT	GB	Home	Road	Div
y-Detroit Pistons	59	23	.720	–	35–6	24–17	22–8
x-Chicago Bulls	55	27	.671	4	36–5	19–22	20–10
x-Milwaukee Bucks	44	38	.537	15	27–14	17–24	14–16
x-Cleveland Cavaliers	42	40	.512	17	27–14	15–26	14–16
x-Indiana Pacers	42	40	.512	17	28–13	14–27	16–14
Atlanta Hawks	41	41	.500	18	25–16	16–25	15–15
Orlando Magic	18	64	.220	41	12–29	6–35	4–26

#	Eastern Conference				
#	Team	W	L	PCT	GB
1	c-Detroit Pistons	59	23	.720	–
2	y-Philadelphia 76ers	53	29	.646	6
3	x-Chicago Bulls	55	27	.671	4
4	x-Boston Celtics	52	30	.634	7
5	x-New York Knicks	45	37	.549	14
6	x-Milwaukee Bucks	44	38	.537	15
7	x-Cleveland Cavaliers	42	40	.512	17
8	x-Indiana Pacers	42	40	.512	17
9	Atlanta Hawks	41	41	.500	18
10	Washington Bullets	31	51	.378	28
11	Miami Heat	18	64	.220	41
12	Orlando Magic	18	64	.220	41
13	New Jersey Nets	17	65	.207	42

=== Game log ===
1989–90 game log
Total: 59–23 (Home: 35–6; Road: 24–17)
November: 9–5 (home: 5–1; road: 4–4)

Game	Date	Team	Score	High points	High rebounds	High assists	Location Attendance	Record

December: 9–6 (home: 5–1; road: 4–5)

Game	Date	Team	Score	High points	High rebounds	High assists	Location Attendance	Record

January: 12–3 (home: 8–1; road: 4–2)

Game	Date	Team	Score	High points	High rebounds	High assists	Location Attendance	Record

February: 10–1 (home: 6–0; road: 4–1)

Game	Date	Team	Score	High points	High rebounds	High assists	Location Attendance	Record

March: 11–4 (home: 6–0; road: 5–4)

Game	Date	Team	Score	High points	High rebounds	High assists	Location Attendance	Record

April: 7–4 (home: 4–3; road: 3–1)

Game	Date	Team	Score	High points	High rebounds	High assists	Location Attendance	Record

1989–90 schedule

== Playoffs ==
1990 playoff game log
First Round: 3–0 (home: 2–0; road: 1–0)

Game	Date	Team	Score	High points	High rebounds	High assists	Location Attendance	Series
1	April 26	Indiana	W 104–92	James Edwards (21)	Bill Laimbeer (14)	Thomas, Dumars (5)	The Palace of Auburn Hills; 21,454	1–0
2	April 28	Indiana	W 100–87	Bill Laimbeer (22)	Bill Laimbeer (11)	Isiah Thomas (12)	The Palace of Auburn Hills; 21,454	2–0
3	May 1	@ Indiana	W 108–96	Isiah Thomas (23)	Bill Laimbeer (19)	Isiah Thomas (9)	Market Square Arena; 15,301	3–0

Conference Semifinals: 4–1 (home: 3–0; road: 1–1)

Game	Date	Team	Score	High points	High rebounds	High assists	Location Attendance	Series
1	May 8	New York	W 112–77	Isiah Thomas (21)	Bill Laimbeer (13)	Isiah Thomas (7)	The Palace of Auburn Hills; 21,454	1–0
2	May 10	New York	W 104–97	James Edwards (32)	Bill Laimbeer (13)	Isiah Thomas (12)	The Palace of Auburn Hills; 21,454	2–0
3	May 12	@ New York	L 103–111	Isiah Thomas (20)	Dennis Rodman (8)	Isiah Thomas (6)	Madison Square Garden; 18,212	2–1
4	May 13	@ New York	W 102–90	James Edwards (19)	Dennis Rodman (14)	Isiah Thomas (11)	Madison Square Garden; 18,212	3–1
5	May 15	New York	W 95–84	Mark Aguirre (25)	Dennis Rodman (11)	Isiah Thomas (6)	The Palace of Auburn Hills; 21,454	4–1

Conference Finals: 4–3 (home: 4–0; road: 0–3)

Game	Date	Team	Score	High points	High rebounds	High assists	Location Attendance	Series
1	May 20	Chicago	W 86–77	Joe Dumars (27)	Dennis Rodman (13)	Isiah Thomas (6)	The Palace of Auburn Hills; 21,454	1–0
2	May 22	Chicago	W 102–93	Joe Dumars (31)	Laimbeer, Johnson (8)	Thomas, Johnson (7)	The Palace of Auburn Hills; 21,454	2–0
3	May 26	@ Chicago	L 102–107	Isiah Thomas (36)	Bill Laimbeer (8)	Isiah Thomas (8)	Chicago Stadium; 18,676	2–1
4	May 28	@ Chicago	L 101–108	Isiah Thomas (26)	Dennis Rodman (20)	Isiah Thomas (8)	Chicago Stadium; 18,676	2–2
5	May 30	Chicago	W 97–83	Joe Dumars (20)	John Salley (10)	Isiah Thomas (10)	The Palace of Auburn Hills; 21,454	3–2
6	June 1	@ Chicago	L 91–109	Joe Dumars (23)	Rodman, Laimbeer (8)	Isiah Thomas (10)	Chicago Stadium; 18,676	3–3
7	June 3	Chicago	W 93–74	Isiah Thomas (21)	Mark Aguirre (10)	Isiah Thomas (11)	The Palace of Auburn Hills; 21,454	4–3

NBA Finals: 4–1 (home: 1–1; road: 3–0)

Game	Date	Team	Score	High points	High rebounds	High assists	Location Attendance	Series
1	June 5	Portland	W 105–99	Isiah Thomas (33)	Bill Laimbeer (15)	Isiah Thomas (6)	The Palace at Auburn Hills; 21,454	1–0
2	June 7	Portland	L 105–106 (OT)	Edwards, Laimbeer (26)	Bill Laimbeer (11)	Isiah Thomas (11)	The Palace at Auburn Hills; 21,454	1–1
3	June 10	@ Portland	W 121–106	Joe Dumars (33)	Bill Laimbeer (12)	Isiah Thomas (8)	Memorial Coliseum; 12,884	2–1
4	June 12	@ Portland	W 112–109	Isiah Thomas (32)	Bill Laimbeer (12)	Isiah Thomas (5)	Memorial Coliseum; 12,642	3–1
5	June 14	@ Portland	W 92–90	Isiah Thomas (29)	Bill Laimbeer (17)	Joe Dumars (7)	Memorial Coliseum; 12,642	4–1

1990 schedule

== Player statistics ==
Legend
GP	Games played	GS	Games started	MPG	Minutes per game
FG%	Field-goal percentage	3P%	3-point field-goal percentage	FT%	Free-throw percentage
RPG	Rebounds per game	APG	Assists per game	SPG	Steals per game
BPG	Blocks per game	PPG	Points per game

=== Season ===
Player	GP	GS	MPG	FG%	3P%	FT%	RPG	APG	SPG	BPG	PPG
Mark Aguirre	78	40	25.7	.488	.333	.756	3.9	1.9	.44	.24	14.1
William Bedford	42	0	5.9	.432	.167	.409	1.4	.1	.07	.40	2.8
Joe Dumars	75	71	34.4	.480	.400	.900	2.8	4.9	.84	.03	17.8
James Edwards	82	70	27.8	.498	.000	.749	4.2	.8	.28	.45	14.5
Dave Greenwood	37	0	5.5	.423	.000	.552	2.1	.3	.11	.24	1.6
Scott Hastings	40	0	4.2	.303	.250	.864	.8	.2	.08	.08	1.0
Gerald Henderson	46	0	7.3	.506	.452	.769	.7	1.3	.17	.04	2.3
Vinnie Johnson	82	12	24.0	.431	.147	.668	3.1	3.1	.87	.16	9.8
Stan Kimbrough	10	0	5.0	.438	.000	1.000	.7	.5	.40	.00	1.6
Bill Laimbeer	81	81	33.0	.484	.361	.854	9.6	2.1	.70	1.04	12.1
Ralph Lewis	4	0	1.5	.000	.000	.000	.0	.0	.00	.00	.0
Dennis Rodman	82	43	29.0	.581	.111	.654	9.7	.9	.63	.73	8.8
John Salley	82	12	23.3	.512	.250	.713	5.4	.8	.62	1.87	7.2
Isiah Thomas	81	81	37.0	.438	.309	.775	3.8	9.4	1.72	.23	18.4

=== Playoffs ===
Player	GP	GS	MPG	FG%	3P%	FT%	RPG	APG	SPG	BPG	PPG
Mark Aguirre	20	3	22.0	.467	.333	.750	4.6	1.4	.50	.15	11.0
William Bedford	5	0	3.8	.167	.000	1.000	.4	.0	.00	.20	.8
Joe Dumars	20	20	37.7	.458	.263	.876	2.2	4.8	1.10	.00	18.2
James Edwards	20	20	26.8	.494	.000	.604	3.6	.6	.25	.55	14.3
Dave Greenwood	5	0	9.4	.500	.000	.250	1.8	.0	.40	.00	1.0
Scott Hastings	5	0	3.2	.250	.000	.000	.0	.0	.20	.00	.4
Gerald Henderson	8	0	2.4	.200	.000	.000	.4	.5	.25	.00	.2
Vinnie Johnson	20	0	23.2	.462	.286	.791	2.8	2.7	.40	.20	10.3
Bill Laimbeer	20	20	33.4	.457	.349	.862	10.6	1.4	1.15	.90	11.1
Dennis Rodman	19	17	29.5	.568	.000	.514	8.5	.9	.47	.68	6.6
John Salley	20	0	27.4	.475	.000	.755	5.8	1.0	.45	1.65	9.5
Isiah Thomas	20	20	37.9	.463	.471	.794	5.4	8.2	2.15	.35	20.4

Player statistics citation:

== Awards and records ==
- Isiah Thomas, NBA Finals Most Valuable Player Award
- Dennis Rodman, NBA Defensive Player of the Year Award
- Joe Dumars, All-NBA Third Team
- Joe Dumars, NBA All-Defensive First Team
- Dennis Rodman, NBA All-Defensive First Team

== Transactions ==
=== Free agents ===
Subtractions
Player	Date signed	New team
Rick Mahorn	Expansion Draft June 15, 1989	Minnesota Timberwolves
