= 1989–90 Chicago Bulls season =

NBA professional basketball team season

- Head coach: Phil Jackson
- General manager: Jerry Krause
- Owner: Jerry Reinsdorf
- Arena: Chicago Stadium

Results
- Record: 55–27 (.671)
- Place: Division: 2nd (Central); Conference: 3rd (Eastern)
- Playoff finish: Eastern Conference finals (lost to Pistons 3–4)
- Stats at Basketball Reference

Local media
- Television: WGN-TV; SportsChannel Chicago (Jim Durham, Johnny “Red” Kerr)
- Radio: WLUP (Jim Durham, Johnny “Red” Kerr)

The 1989–90 Chicago Bulls season was the 24th season for the Chicago Bulls in the National Basketball Association.

== Season summary ==
=== Off-season ===
The Bulls received the sixth overall pick in the 1989 NBA draft from the New Jersey Nets via trade, and selected power forward Stacey King from the University of Oklahoma, and also selected point guard B.J. Armstrong from the University of Iowa with the 18th overall pick. Despite their solid playoff run last year, the team fired head coach Doug Collins, and replaced him with assistant coach Phil Jackson.

=== Regular season ===
Under Jackson, and with the addition of King and Armstrong, the Bulls played around .500 in winning percentage with a 5–5 start to the regular season, but then won 10 of their next 12 games, and later on held a 28–19 record at the All-Star break. The team posted a nine-game winning streak between February and March, and posted another nine-game winning streak between March and April. The Bulls finished in second place in the Central Division with a 55–27 record, earned the third seed in the Eastern Conference, and qualified for the NBA playoffs for the sixth consecutive year.

Michael Jordan averaged 33.6 points, 6.9 rebounds, 6.3 assists and 2.8 steals per game, and was named to the All-NBA First Team, to the NBA All-Defensive First Team, while Scottie Pippen continued to show improvement averaging 16.5 points, 6.7 rebounds, 5.4 assists and 2.6 steals per game. In addition, Horace Grant provided the team with 13.4 points and 7.9 rebounds per game, while Bill Cartwright contributed 11.4 points and 6.5 rebounds per game, and John Paxson contributed 10.0 points per game. Off the bench, King averaged 8.9 points and 4.7 rebounds per game, and was named to the NBA All-Rookie Second Team, while three-point specialist Craig Hodges contributed 6.5 points per game, and Armstrong provided with 5.6 points and 2.5 assists per game.

During the NBA All-Star weekend at the Miami Arena in Miami, Florida, Jordan and Pippen were both selected for the 1990 NBA All-Star Game, as members of the Eastern Conference All-Star team; it was Pippen's first ever All-Star appearance. In addition, Jordan and Hodges both participated in the NBA Three-Point Shootout, in which Hodges won the competition, and Pippen participated in the NBA Slam Dunk Contest. Jordan finished in third place in Most Valuable Player voting, behind Magic Johnson of the Los Angeles Lakers, and Charles Barkley of the Philadelphia 76ers; Jordan also finished tied in fifth place in Defensive Player of the Year voting, while Pippen finished tied in sixth place in Most Improved Player voting, and Jackson finished tied in seventh place in Coach of the Year voting.

The Bulls finished fourth in the NBA in home-game attendance, with an attendance of 752,564 at the Chicago Stadium during the regular season.

=== NBA playoffs ===
In the Eastern Conference First Round of the 1990 NBA playoffs, the Bulls faced off against the 6th–seeded Milwaukee Bucks, a team that featured Sixth Man of the Year, Ricky Pierce, Alvin Robertson and Jay Humphries. The Bulls won the first two games over the Bucks at home at the Chicago Stadium, before losing Game 3 on the road, 119–112 at the Bradley Center, despite a 48-point performance from Jordan. The Bulls won Game 4 over the Bucks on the road, 110–86 to win the series in four games.

In the Eastern Conference Semi-finals, the team faced off against the 2nd–seeded, and Atlantic Division champion 76ers, who were led by Barkley, second-year star Hersey Hawkins, and Johnny Dawkins. The Bulls took a 2–0 series lead, before losing Game 3 to the 76ers on the road, 118–112 at The Spectrum, despite a 49-point performance from Jordan. The Bulls managed to win the next two games, which included a Game 5 home win over the 76ers, 117–99 at the Chicago Stadium, thus winning the series in five games.

In the Eastern Conference Finals, and for the third consecutive year, the Bulls faced off against the top–seeded, and defending NBA champion Detroit Pistons, who won the Central Division title, and were led by the All-Star trio of Isiah Thomas, Joe Dumars, and Defensive Player of the Year, Dennis Rodman. The Bulls lost the first two games to the Pistons on the road at The Palace of Auburn Hills, but managed to win the next two games at home at the Chicago Stadium. After losing Game 5 at The Palace of Auburn Hills, 97–83, the Bulls won Game 6 over the Pistons at the Chicago Stadium, 109–91 to tie the series at 3–3. However, the Bulls lost Game 7 to the Pistons at The Palace of Auburn Hills, 93–74, thus losing in a hard-fought seven-game series.

The Pistons would go on to defeat the Portland Trail Blazers in five games in the 1990 NBA Finals, winning their second consecutive NBA championship.

=== Notable highlights ===
One notable highlight of the regular season occurred on March 28, 1990, in a road game against the Cleveland Cavaliers at the Coliseum at Richfield. Jordan scored a career-high of 69 points as the Bulls defeated the Cavaliers in overtime, 117–113; Jordan made 23 out of 37 field-goal attempts, made 21 out of 23 free-throw attempts, and also grabbed 18 rebounds. It was the highest scoring output by an NBA player since David Thompson's 73 points on April 9, 1978, against the Detroit Pistons. In the summer of 1997, Jordan admitted in an interview that he went off for 69 points after the Cavaliers' fans cheered when he was fouled hard by Cavaliers forward Hot Rod Williams, with Jordan lying on the ground in pain; Jordan said that the Cavaliers' fans were more in tune to winning than someone else's health, stating "that right there pissed me off, that's when I went crazy".

On February 14, 1990, before a road game against the expansion Orlando Magic, Jordan's number 23 jersey was stolen from the Bulls' locker room at the Orlando Arena; Jordan had to wear a number 12 jersey instead. Jordan scored 49 points as the Bulls lost to the Magic in overtime, 135–129.

== Draft picks ==
Round	Pick	Player	Position	Nationality	School/Club team
1	6	Stacey King	PF/C	United States	Oklahoma
1	18	BJ Armstrong	PG	United States	Iowa
1	20	Jeff Sanders	F	United States	Georgia Southern

== Roster ==
1989–90 Chicago Bulls roster
Players

Pos.	No.	Player	Height	Weight	DOB	From
G	10	BJ Armstrong	6 ft 2 in (1.88 m)	175 lb (79 kg)	1967–09–09	Iowa
C	24	Bill Cartwright	7 ft 1 in (2.16 m)	245 lb (111 kg)	1957–07–30	San Francisco
F	22	Charles Davis	6 ft 7 in (2.01 m)	215 lb (98 kg)	1958–10–05	Vanderbilt
F	54	Horace Grant	6 ft 10 in (2.08 m)	215 lb (98 kg)	1965–07–04	Clemson
G	14	Craig Hodges	6 ft 2 in (1.88 m)	190 lb (86 kg)	1960–06–27	Long Beach State
G	23	Michael Jordan	6 ft 6 in (1.98 m)	195 lb (88 kg)	1963–02–17	North Carolina
F	34	Stacey King	6 ft 11 in (2.11 m)	230 lb (104 kg)	1967–01–29	Oklahoma
F	45	Ed Nealy	6 ft 7 in (2.01 m)	238 lb (108 kg)	1960–02–19	Kansas State
G	5	John Paxson	6 ft 2 in (1.88 m)	185 lb (84 kg)	1960–09–29	Notre Dame
C	32	Will Perdue	7 ft 0 in (2.13 m)	240 lb (109 kg)	1965–08–29	Vanderbilt
F	33	Scottie Pippen	6 ft 8 in (2.03 m)	210 lb (95 kg)	1965–09–25	Central Arkansas
F	42	Jeff Sanders	6 ft 8 in (2.03 m)	225 lb (102 kg)	1966–01–14	Georgia Southern

Coaches
Head coach
- Phil Jackson
Assistant(s)
- Johnny Bach
- Jim Cleamons
- Tex Winter

Legend
- (DP) Unsigned draft pick
- (FA) Free agent
- (S) Suspended
- Injured

Roster
Updated: March 25, 1990

== Regular season ==
=== Season standings ===
Central Division	W	L	PCT	GB	Home	Road	Div
y-Detroit Pistons	59	23	.720	–	35–6	24–17	22–8
x-Chicago Bulls	55	27	.671	4	36–5	19–22	20–10
x-Milwaukee Bucks	44	38	.537	15	27–14	17–24	14–16
x-Cleveland Cavaliers	42	40	.512	17	27–14	15–26	14–16
x-Indiana Pacers	42	40	.512	17	28–13	14–27	16–14
Atlanta Hawks	41	41	.500	18	25–16	16–25	15–15
Orlando Magic	18	64	.220	41	12–29	6–35	4–26

#	Eastern Conference				
#	Team	W	L	PCT	GB
1	c-Detroit Pistons	59	23	.720	–
2	y-Philadelphia 76ers	53	29	.646	6
3	x-Chicago Bulls	55	27	.671	4
4	x-Boston Celtics	52	30	.634	7
5	x-New York Knicks	45	37	.549	14
6	x-Milwaukee Bucks	44	38	.537	15
7	x-Cleveland Cavaliers	42	40	.512	17
8	x-Indiana Pacers	42	40	.512	17
9	Atlanta Hawks	41	41	.500	18
10	Washington Bullets	31	51	.378	28
11	Miami Heat	18	64	.220	41
12	Orlando Magic	18	64	.220	41
13	New Jersey Nets	17	65	.207	42

z – clinched division title
y – clinched division title
x – clinched playoff spot

=== Schedule ===
#	Date	Opponent	W/L	Score	Record	Streak
1	November 3, 1989	Cleveland Cavaliers	W	124–119 (OT)	1–0	Won 1
2	November 4, 1989	Boston Celtics	L	100–102	1–1	Lost 1
3	November 7, 1989	Detroit Pistons	W	117–114	2–1	Won 1
4	November 8, 1989	@ Minnesota Timberwolves	W	96–84	3–1	Won 2
5	November 10, 1989	@ New Jersey Nets	L	107–117	3–2	Lost 1
6	November 11, 1989	Seattle SuperSonics	W	109–102	4–2	Won 1
7	November 14, 1989	@ Sacramento Kings	W	96–94	5–2	Won 2
8	November 15, 1989	@ Utah Jazz	L	107–108	5–3	Lost 1
9	November 18, 1989	@ Seattle SuperSonics	L	110–119	5–4	Lost 2
10	November 21, 1989	@ Portland Trail Blazers	L	110–121	5–5	Lost 3
11	November 22, 1989	@ Phoenix Suns	W	95–90	6–5	Won 1
12	November 25, 1989	@ Golden State Warriors	W	104–91	7–5	Won 2
13	November 26, 1989	@ Los Angeles Clippers	L	96–120	7–6	Lost 1
14	November 28, 1989	Atlanta Hawks	W	113–98	8–6	Won 1
15	December 2, 1989	@ Miami Heat	W	114–107	9–6	Won 2
16	December 5, 1989	Denver Nuggets	W	119–99	10–6	Won 3
17	December 8, 1989	@ Indiana Pacers	L	104–106	10–7	Lost 1
18	December 9, 1989	Philadelphia 76ers	W	125–105	11–7	Won 1
19	December 12, 1989	Dallas Mavericks	W	105–97	12–7	Won 2
20	December 14, 1989	Orlando Magic	W	124–113	13–7	Won 3
21	December 16, 1989	Charlotte Hornets	W	115–104	14–7	Won 4
22	December 19, 1989	Los Angeles Lakers	W	93–83	15–7	Won 5
23	December 20, 1989	@ Orlando Magic	L	109–110	15–8	Lost 1
24	December 22, 1989	@ Atlanta Hawks	W	125–113	16–8	Won 1
25	December 23, 1989	@ Philadelphia 76ers	L	104–131	16–9	Lost 1
26	December 26, 1989	Minnesota Timberwolves	W	112–99	17–9	Won 1
27	December 29, 1989	San Antonio Spurs	W	101–97	18–9	Won 2
28	December 30, 1989	@ Washington Bullets	W	117–112 (OT)	19–9	Won 3
29	January 3, 1990	@ Cleveland Cavaliers	W	93–87	20–9	Won 4
30	January 5, 1990	Orlando Magic	W	127–116	21–9	Won 5
31	January 6, 1990	@ Milwaukee Bucks	L	111–118	21–10	Lost 1
32	January 9, 1990	@ Detroit Pistons	L	90–100	21–11	Lost 2
33	January 10, 1990	@ Indiana Pacers	L	113–120	21–12	Lost 3
34	January 12, 1990	@ Charlotte Hornets	W	107–95	22–12	Won 1
35	January 13, 1990	Los Angeles Clippers	W	117–111	23–12	Won 2
36	January 15, 1990	@ New York Knicks	L	106–109	23–13	Lost 1
37	January 18, 1990	Golden State Warriors	W	132–107	24–13	Won 1
38	January 19, 1990	@ Atlanta Hawks	W	92–84	25–13	Won 2
39	January 21, 1990	New York Knicks	W	117–109	26–13	Won 3
40	January 23, 1990	Detroit Pistons	L	95–107	26–14	Lost 1
41	January 26, 1990	@ Philadelphia 76ers	L	109–120	26–15	Lost 2
42	January 27, 1990	New Jersey Nets	W	110–107	27–15	Won 1
43	January 29, 1990	Atlanta Hawks	W	121–111	28–15	Won 2
44	February 1, 1990	@ Houston Rockets	L	112–139	28–16	Lost 1
45	February 3, 1990	@ San Antonio Spurs	L	111–112	28–17	Lost 2
46	February 7, 1990	@ Los Angeles Lakers	L	103–121	28–18	Lost 3
47	February 8, 1990	@ Denver Nuggets	L	98–123	28–19	Lost 4
48	February 13, 1990	@ Miami Heat	W	107–95	29–19	Won 1
49	February 14, 1990	@ Orlando Magic	L	129–135 (OT)	29–20	Lost 1
50	February 16, 1990	Miami Heat	W	119–105	30–20	Won 1
51	February 18, 1990	@ Milwaukee Bucks	W	111–88	31–20	Won 2
52	February 19, 1990	Houston Rockets	W	107–102	32–20	Won 3
53	February 23, 1990	Portland Trail Blazers	W	113–102	33–20	Won 4
54	February 25, 1990	@ New Jersey Nets	W	107–106 (OT)	34–20	Won 5
55	February 27, 1990	Milwaukee Bucks	W	106–96	35–20	Won 6
56	March 2, 1990	New Jersey Nets	W	112–91	36–20	Won 7
57	March 4, 1990	@ Boston Celtics	W	118–114	37–20	Won 8
58	March 6, 1990	@ Milwaukee Bucks	W	114–105	38–20	Won 9
59	March 8, 1990	Utah Jazz	L	94–98	38–21	Lost 1
60	March 10, 1990	Indiana Pacers	W	117–105	39–21	Won 1
61	March 13, 1990	@ New York Knicks	W	111–108	40–21	Won 2
62	March 16, 1990	Detroit Pistons	L	81–106	40–22	Lost 1
63	March 17, 1990	Philadelphia 76ers	W	114–109	41–22	Won 1
64	March 20, 1990	Washington Bullets	W	122–97	42–22	Won 2
65	March 21, 1990	@ Atlanta Hawks	W	99–89	43–22	Won 3
66	March 23, 1990	Cleveland Cavaliers	W	102–95	44–22	Won 4
67	March 24, 1990	Sacramento Kings	L	113–116	44–23	Lost 1
68	March 26, 1990	Phoenix Suns	W	121–92	45–23	Won 1
69	March 28, 1990	@ Cleveland Cavaliers	W	117–113 (OT)	46–23	Won 2
70	March 30, 1990	New York Knicks	W	107–106 (OT)	47–23	Won 3
71	April 1, 1990	Miami Heat	W	111–103	48–23	Won 4
72	April 3, 1990	Indiana Pacers	W	109–102	49–23	Won 5
73	April 5, 1990	Orlando Magic	W	111–104	50–23	Won 6
74	April 7, 1990	@ Dallas Mavericks	W	109–108	51–23	Won 7
75	April 11, 1990	Cleveland Cavaliers	W	107–86	52–23	Won 8
76	April 13, 1990	Milwaukee Bucks	W	116–106	53–23	Won 9
77	April 14, 1990	@ Washington Bullets	L	103–113	53–24	Lost 1
78	April 16, 1990	@ Indiana Pacers	L	102–111	53–25	Lost 2
79	April 17, 1990	Boston Celtics	W	111–105	54–25	Won 1
80	April 19, 1990	Washington Bullets	W	120–117	55–25	Won 2
81	April 20, 1990	@ Boston Celtics	L	116–120	55–26	Lost 1
82	April 22, 1990	@ Detroit Pistons	L	106–111	55–27	Lost 2

== Playoffs ==
1990 playoff game log
First Round: 3–1 (home: 2–0; road: 1–1)

Game	Date	Team	Score	High points	High rebounds	High assists	Location Attendance	Series
1	April 27	Milwaukee	W 111–97	Michael Jordan (38)	Scottie Pippen (10)	Scottie Pippen (13)	Chicago Stadium; 18,676	1–0
2	April 29	Milwaukee	W 109–102	Michael Jordan (36)	Michael Jordan (9)	Michael Jordan (11)	Chicago Stadium; 18,676	2–0
3	May 1	@ Milwaukee	L 112–119	Michael Jordan (48)	Horace Grant (11)	Scottie Pippen (9)	Bradley Center; 18,575	2–1
4	May 3	@ Milwaukee	W 110–86	Michael Jordan (25)	Horace Grant (14)	Michael Jordan (5)	Bradley Center; 18,633	3–1

Conference semifinals: 4–1 (home: 3–0; road: 1–1)

Game	Date	Team	Score	High points	High rebounds	High assists	Location Attendance	Series
1	May 4	Philadelphia	W 105–92	Michael Jordan (29)	Horace Grant (9)	Scottie Pippen (7)	Chicago Stadium; 18,676	1–0
2	May 6	Philadelphia	W 112–100	Michael Jordan (29)	Scottie Pippen (11)	Michael Jordan (9)	Chicago Stadium; 18,676	2–0
3	May 10	@ Philadelphia	L 97–99	Michael Jordan (46)	Scottie Pippen (13)	Pippen, Jordan (6)	Spectrum; 18,168	2–1
4	May 12	@ Philadelphia	W 101–85	Michael Jordan (25)	Horace Grant (11)	Michael Jordan (12)	Spectrum; 17,514	3–1
5	May 14	Philadelphia	W 100–95	Michael Jordan (38)	Michael Jordan (19)	Michael Jordan (7)	Chicago Stadium; 18,676	4–1

Conference finals: 3–4 (home: 3–0; road: 0–4)

Game	Date	Team	Score	High points	High rebounds	High assists	Location Attendance	Series
1	May 20	@ Detroit	L 77–86	Michael Jordan (34)	Horace Grant (9)	Michael Jordan (5)	The Palace of Auburn Hills; 21,454	0–1
2	May 22	@ Detroit	L 93–102	Michael Jordan (20)	Horace Grant (9)	Michael Jordan (7)	The Palace of Auburn Hills; 21,454	0–2
3	May 26	Detroit	W 107–102	Michael Jordan (47)	Pippen, Grant (11)	Scottie Pippen (5)	Chicago Stadium; 18,676	1–2
4	May 28	Detroit	W 108–101	Michael Jordan (42)	Horace Grant (13)	Michael Jordan (9)	Chicago Stadium; 18,676	2–2
5	May 30	@ Detroit	L 83–97	Michael Jordan (22)	Horace Grant (12)	Michael Jordan (8)	The Palace of Auburn Hills; 21,454	2–3
6	June 1	Detroit	W 109–91	Michael Jordan (29)	Horace Grant (14)	Pippen, Grant (5)	Chicago Stadium; 18,676	3–3
7	June 3	@ Detroit	L 74–93	Michael Jordan (31)	Horace Grant (14)	Michael Jordan (9)	The Palace of Auburn Hills; 21,454	3–4

1990 schedule

== Player statistics ==
Legend
GP	Games played	GS	Games started	MPG	Minutes per game
FG%	Field-goal percentage	3P%	3-point field-goal percentage	FT%	Free-throw percentage
RPG	Rebounds per game	APG	Assists per game	SPG	Steals per game
BPG	Blocks per game	PPG	Points per game

=== Regular season ===
Player	GP	GS	MPG	FG%	3P%	FT%	RPG	APG	SPG	BPG	PPG
B. J. Armstrong	81	0	15.9	.485	.500	.885	1.3	2.5	.6	.1	5.6
Bill Cartwright	71	71	30.4	.488		.811	6.5	2.0	.5	.5	11.4
Charles Davis	53	0	8.1	.367	.280	.875	1.5	.3	.2	.2	2.5
Horace Grant	80	80	34.4	.523		.699	7.9	2.8	1.2	1.1	13.4
Jack Haley^{†}	11	0	5.3	.450		1.000	1.6	.4	.0	.1	2.3
Craig Hodges	63	0	16.7	.438	.481	.909	.8	1.7	.5	.0	6.5
Michael Jordan	82	82	39.0	.526	.376	.848	6.9	6.3	2.8	.7	33.6
Stacey King	82	2	21.7	.504	.000	.727	4.7	1.1	.5	.7	8.9
Clifford Lett	4	0	7.0	.250			.0	.3	.0	.0	1.0
Ed Nealy	46	0	10.9	.529	.000	.732	3.0	.6	.3	.1	2.3
John Paxson	82	82	28.8	.516	.359	.824	1.5	4.1	1.0	.1	10.0
Will Perdue	77	11	11.5	.414	.000	.692	2.8	.6	.2	.3	3.8
Scottie Pippen	82	82	38.4	.489	.250	.675	6.7	5.4	2.6	1.2	16.5
Jeff Sanders	31	0	5.9	.325		.500	1.3	.3	.1	.1	.9

=== Playoffs ===
Player	GP	GS	MPG	FG%	3P%	FT%	RPG	APG	SPG	BPG	PPG
B. J. Armstrong	16	0	13.6	.339	.000	.917	1.3	1.8	.6	.0	4.0
Bill Cartwright	16	16	28.9	.413		.674	4.7	1.0	.3	.3	8.1
Charles Davis	6	0	3.3	.286	.000		.5	.2	.0	.0	.7
Horace Grant	16	16	38.5	.509	.000	.623	9.9	2.5	1.1	1.1	12.2
Craig Hodges	16	1	15.9	.378	.293	.750	1.1	1.1	.3	.0	4.4
Michael Jordan	16	16	42.1	.514	.320	.836	7.2	6.8	2.8	.9	36.7
Stacey King	16	2	17.6	.407	.000	.766	3.2	.6	.4	.5	6.9
Ed Nealy	15	0	15.2	.472	.000	.619	3.5	.3	.7	.1	3.1
John Paxson	15	15	26.3	.425	.444	1.000	1.5	3.6	.6	.0	6.1
Will Perdue	13	0	6.0	.464	.500	.722	1.5	.2	.0	.4	3.1
Scottie Pippen	15	14	40.8	.495	.323	.710	7.2	5.5	2.1	1.3	19.3
Jeff Sanders	3	0	1.0	1.000			.0	.0	.0	.0	.7

- ^{†} Denotes player spent time with another team in the season. Stats reflect time with the Bulls only.

Player statistics citation:

== Awards and records ==
- Craig Hodges, NBA All-Star Weekend Three-Point Shootout Winner
- Michael Jordan, All-NBA First Team
- Michael Jordan, NBA All-Defensive First Team
- Stacey King, NBA All-Rookie Team 2nd Team
- Michael Jordan, NBA All-Star Game
- Scottie Pippen, NBA All-Star Game

== Transactions ==
=== Free agents ===
Subtractions
Player	Date signed	New team
Sam Vincent	Expansion Draft June 15, 1989	Orlando Magic
