= 1989–90 NBA season =

44th NBA season

- League: National Basketball Association
- Sport: Basketball
- Duration: November 3, 1989 – April 22, 1990; April 26 – June 3, 1990 (Playoffs); June 5 – 14, 1990 (Finals)
- Teams: 27
- TV partner(s): CBS, TBS, TNT

Draft
- Top draft pick: Pervis Ellison
- Picked by: Sacramento Kings

Regular season
- Top seed: Los Angeles Lakers
- Season MVP: Magic Johnson (L.A. Lakers)
- Top scorer: Michael Jordan (Chicago)

Playoffs
- Eastern champions: Detroit Pistons
- Eastern runners-up: Chicago Bulls
- Western champions: Portland Trail Blazers
- Western runners-up: Phoenix Suns

Finals
- Champions: Detroit Pistons
- Runners-up: Portland Trail Blazers
- Finals MVP: Isiah Thomas (Detroit)

NBA seasons
- ← 1988–89 1990–91 →

The 1989–90 NBA season was the 44th season of the National Basketball Association. The season ended with the Detroit Pistons winning their second consecutive NBA championship, beating the Portland Trail Blazers 4 games to 1 in the NBA Finals. It was also the Pistons' second NBA title overall.

== Notable occurrences ==
Coaching changes
Offseason
Team	1988–89 coach	1989–90 coach
Chicago Bulls	Doug Collins	Phil Jackson
Minnesota Timberwolves	Expansion	Bill Musselman
New Jersey Nets	Willis Reed	Bill Fitch
New York Knicks	Rick Pitino	Stu Jackson
Orlando Magic	Expansion	Matt Guokas
In-season
Team	Outgoing coach	Incoming coach
Sacramento Kings	Jerry Reynolds	Dick Motta
Dallas Mavericks	John MacLeod	Richie Adubato
Charlotte Hornets	Dick Harter	Gene Littles

- The Minnesota Timberwolves and the Orlando Magic entered the NBA as the league's 26th and 27th franchises. The Timberwolves played their preseason schedule at the Met Center in the Minneapolis suburb of Bloomington home of the NHL's Minnesota North Stars. They played their regular season schedule at the Hubert H. Humphrey Metrodome, former home of the NFL's Minnesota Vikings and MLB's Minnesota Twins. They would move to smaller-capacity Target Center for the 1990–91 season. The Magic would play at Orlando Arena (later known as TD Waterhouse Centre and Amway Arena) for the next 21 years.
- The NBA All-Star Weekend was in Miami Arena in Miami. In the 1990 NBA All-Star Game, the East defeated the West 130–113. Magic Johnson of the Los Angeles Lakers took home the game's MVP award, becoming the third player in history to win the award in a losing effort. Dominique Wilkins of the Atlanta Hawks edged out Kenny Smith of the Sacramento Kings to win the Slam Dunk Contest.
- The Charlotte Hornets were aligned in the Midwest Division in the Western Conference. Charlotte would be aligned in the Central Division for good starting the next year. The league had placed the four new teams in different divisions to spread them out over their first few seasons.
- After seventeen seasons as the broadcast television home for NBA basketball, CBS Sports aired its final NBA broadcast in Game 5 of the Finals from Portland. NBC Sports would begin a twelve-season run as the league's new broadcast partner beginning the next season.
  - This was also the first season that Turner Sports aired games on its, at the time, new cable outlet Turner Network Television; this began a long relationship between TNT and the NBA that would run until the end of the 2024–25 season.
- The NBA adopted the FIBA rule that game clocks register tenths of seconds in the final minute of a quarter. This rule turns controversial during the season because of clock calibration problems in many venues; following a January 15, 1990, game at Madison Square Garden between the New York Knicks and the Chicago Bulls where Trent Tucker sank a three-point basket with the ball put in play with one-tenth of a second remaining, the NBA mandated clock calibration and prohibited any shot made when the ball is put in play with less than three-tenths of a second remaining from counting unless it is a dunk or a tip-in. The Trent Tucker Rule would be established the following year as a result of this incident.
- All three Texas-based teams made the playoffs. This would not happen again until 2004.
- This was the last of nine consecutive seasons in which the Lakers finished as the No. 1 seed in the Western Conference. They would not return there until 2000.
- Long-time Boston Celtics announcer Johnny Most retired after 37 years behind the microphone. Most was best known for his call of "Havlicek stole the ball!!" in the 1965 Eastern Division Finals between the Celtics and the Sixers.
- The Philadelphia 76ers won their first Atlantic Division title since the 1982–83 championship season, and the first in the post-Julius Erving era. They lost to the Bulls in the second round of the playoffs.
- Several players from Eastern Bloc countries in Europe made an impact in the NBA. Yugoslavia's Vlade Divac and Dražen Petrović, and the Soviet Union's Šarūnas Marčiulionis and Alexander Volkov were among the pioneering players from Eastern Europe who made the jump to the NBA.
- On March 28, 1990, near the end of the 1989–90 season, the Cleveland Cavaliers faced their new nemesis Michael Jordan. Needing the victory to clinch a playoff berth, Jordan set his career high with 69 points in an overtime win and putting a dent in the Cavaliers' playoff plans.
- The Spurs orchestrated the biggest turnaround, with rookie David Robinson at center. After finishing 21–61 in 1988–89, they improved by 35 games and won the Midwest Division.
- Scottie Pippen becomes the first forward in NBA history to accumulate over 200 steals with over 100 blocks in a season.

== 1989–90 NBA changes ==
- The Cleveland Cavaliers slightly changed their road uniforms, replacing the team nickname "Cavs" with the city name "Cleveland" on their jerseys.
- The Golden State Warriors changed their logo and uniforms.
- The Los Angeles Clippers slightly changed their uniforms.
- The New York Knicks changed their logo, adding more orange to their previous logo.
- The San Antonio Spurs changed their logo and uniforms.

== Final standings ==
=== By division ===
Atlantic Division	W	L	PCT	GB	Home	Road	Div
y-Philadelphia 76ers	53	29	.646	–	34–7	19–22	19–7
x-Boston Celtics	52	30	.634	1	30–11	22–19	19–7
x-New York Knicks	45	37	.549	8	29–12	16–25	17–9
Washington Bullets	31	51	.378	22	20–21	11–30	10–16
Miami Heat	18	64	.220	35	11–30	7–34	4–22
New Jersey Nets	17	65	.207	36	13–28	4–37	9–17

Central Division	W	L	PCT	GB	Home	Road	Div
y-Detroit Pistons	59	23	.720	–	35–6	24–17	22–8
x-Chicago Bulls	55	27	.671	4	36–5	19–22	20–10
x-Milwaukee Bucks	44	38	.537	15	27–14	17–24	14–16
x-Cleveland Cavaliers	42	40	.512	17	27–14	15–26	14–16
x-Indiana Pacers	42	40	.512	17	28–13	14–27	16–14
Atlanta Hawks	41	41	.500	18	25–16	16–25	15–15
Orlando Magic	18	64	.220	41	12–29	6–35	4–26

Midwest Division	W	L	PCT	GB	Home	Road	Div
y-San Antonio Spurs	56	26	.683	–	34–7	22–19	19–9
x-Utah Jazz	55	27	.671	1	36–5	19–22	21–7
x-Dallas Mavericks	47	35	.573	9	30–11	17–24	17–11
x-Denver Nuggets	43	39	.524	13	28–13	15–26	15–13
x-Houston Rockets	41	41	.500	15	31–10	10–31	13–15
Minnesota Timberwolves	22	60	.268	34	17–24	5–36	6–22
Charlotte Hornets	19	63	.232	37	13–28	6–35	7–21

Pacific Division	W	L	PCT	GB	Home	Road	Div
y-Los Angeles Lakers	63	19	.768	–	37–4	26–15	22–6
x-Portland Trail Blazers	59	23	.720	4	35–6	24–17	20–8
x-Phoenix Suns	54	28	.659	9	32–9	22–19	20–8
Seattle SuperSonics	41	41	.500	22	30–11	11–30	11–17
Golden State Warriors	37	45	.451	26	27–14	10–31	11–17
Los Angeles Clippers	30	52	.366	33	20–21	10–31	7–21
Sacramento Kings	23	59	.280	40	16–25	7–34	7–21

=== By conference ===
#	Eastern Conference				
#	Team	W	L	PCT	GB
1	c-Detroit Pistons	59	23	.720	–
2	y-Philadelphia 76ers	53	29	.646	6
3	x-Chicago Bulls	55	27	.671	4
4	x-Boston Celtics	52	30	.634	7
5	x-New York Knicks	45	37	.549	14
6	x-Milwaukee Bucks	44	38	.537	15
7	x-Cleveland Cavaliers	42	40	.512	17
8	x-Indiana Pacers	42	40	.512	17
9	Atlanta Hawks	41	41	.500	18
10	Washington Bullets	31	51	.378	28
11	Miami Heat	18	64	.220	41
12	Orlando Magic	18	64	.220	41
13	New Jersey Nets	17	65	.207	42

#	Western Conference				
#	Team	W	L	PCT	GB
1	z-Los Angeles Lakers	63	19	.768	–
2	y-San Antonio Spurs	56	26	.683	7
3	x-Portland Trail Blazers	59	23	.720	4
4	x-Utah Jazz	55	27	.671	8
5	x-Phoenix Suns	54	28	.659	9
6	x-Dallas Mavericks	47	35	.573	16
7	x-Denver Nuggets	43	39	.524	20
8	x-Houston Rockets	41	41	.500	22
9	Seattle SuperSonics	41	41	.500	22
10	Golden State Warriors	37	45	.451	26
11	Los Angeles Clippers	30	52	.366	33
12	Sacramento Kings	23	59	.280	40
13	Minnesota Timberwolves	22	60	.268	41
14	Charlotte Hornets	19	63	.232	44

Notes

- z – Clinched home court advantage for the entire playoffs
- c – Clinched home court advantage for the conference playoffs
- y – Clinched division title
- x – Clinched playoff spot

== Playoffs ==
Teams in bold advanced to the next round. The numbers to the left of each team indicate the team's seeding in its conference, and the numbers to the right indicate the number of games the team won in that round. The division champions are marked by an asterisk. Home court advantage does not necessarily belong to the higher-seeded team, but instead the team with the better regular season record; teams enjoying the home advantage are shown in italics.

First Round	Conference Semifinals
**E1**	**Detroit***	**3**
E8	Indiana	0
**E1**	**Detroit***	**4**
E5	New York	1
E4	Boston	2
**E5**	**New York**	**3**
**Eastern Conference**
**E3**	**Chicago**	**3**
E6	Milwaukee	1
**E3**	**Chicago**	**4**
E2	Philadelphia*	1
**E2**	**Philadelphia***	**3**
E7	Cleveland	2
**W1**	**LA Lakers***	**3**
W8	Houston	1
W1	LA Lakers*	1
**W5**	**Phoenix**	**4**
W4	Utah	2
**W5**	**Phoenix**	**3**
**Western Conference**
**W3**	**Portland**	**3**
W6	Dallas	0
**W3**	**Portland**	**4**
W2	San Antonio*	3
**W2**	**San Antonio***	**3**
W7	Denver	0

Conference Finals
**E1**	**Detroit***	**4**
E3	Chicago	3
W5	Phoenix	2
**W3**	**Portland**	**4**

NBA Finals
**E1**	**Detroit***	**4**
W3	Portland	1

- * Division winner
- **Bold** Series winner
- Italic Team with home-court advantage

== Statistics leaders ==
Category	Player	Team	Stat
Points per game	Michael Jordan	Chicago Bulls	33.6
Rebounds per game	Akeem Olajuwon	Houston Rockets	14.0
Assists per game	John Stockton	Utah Jazz	14.5
Steals per game	Michael Jordan	Chicago Bulls	2.77
Blocks per game	Akeem Olajuwon	Houston Rockets	4.59
FG%	Mark West	Phoenix Suns	.625
FT%	Larry Bird	Boston Celtics	.930
3FG%	Steve Kerr	Cleveland Cavaliers	.507

== NBA awards ==
- Most Valuable Player: Magic Johnson, Los Angeles Lakers
- Rookie of the Year: David Robinson, San Antonio Spurs
- Defensive Player of the Year: Dennis Rodman, Detroit Pistons
- Sixth Man of the Year: Ricky Pierce, Milwaukee Bucks
- Most Improved Player: Rony Seikaly, Miami Heat
- Coach of the Year: Pat Riley, Los Angeles Lakers

- All-NBA First Team:
  - F – Karl Malone, Utah Jazz
  - F – Charles Barkley, Philadelphia 76ers
  - C – Patrick Ewing, New York Knicks
  - G – Michael Jordan, Chicago Bulls
  - G – Magic Johnson, Los Angeles Lakers
- All-NBA Second Team:
  - F – Larry Bird, Boston Celtics
  - F – Tom Chambers, Phoenix Suns
  - C – Akeem Olajuwon, Houston Rockets
  - G – John Stockton, Utah Jazz
  - G – Kevin Johnson, Phoenix Suns
- All-NBA Third Team:
  - F – James Worthy, Los Angeles Lakers
  - F – Chris Mullin, Golden State Warriors
  - C – David Robinson, San Antonio Spurs
  - G – Clyde Drexler, Portland Trail Blazers
  - G –Joe Dumars, Detroit Pistons

- NBA All-Rookie First Team:
  - Tim Hardaway, Golden State Warriors
  - Pooh Richardson, Minnesota Timberwolves
  - David Robinson, San Antonio Spurs
  - Sherman Douglas, Miami Heat
  - Vlade Divac, Los Angeles Lakers
- NBA All-Rookie Second Team:
  - Blue Edwards, Utah Jazz
  - Sean Elliott, San Antonio Spurs
  - Stacey King, Chicago Bulls
  - J.R. Reid, Charlotte Hornets
  - Glen Rice, Miami Heat

- NBA All-Defensive First Team:
  - Dennis Rodman, Detroit Pistons
  - Buck Williams, Portland Trail Blazers
  - Akeem Olajuwon, Houston Rockets
  - Michael Jordan, Chicago Bulls
  - Joe Dumars, Detroit Pistons
- NBA All-Defensive Second Team:
  - Kevin McHale, Boston Celtics
  - Rick Mahorn, Philadelphia 76ers
  - David Robinson, San Antonio Spurs
  - Derek Harper, Dallas Mavericks
  - Alvin Robertson, Milwaukee Bucks

=== Player of the week ===
The following players were named NBA Player of the Week.

Week	Player
Nov. 3 – Nov. 12	Vern Fleming (Indiana Pacers)
Nov. 13 – Nov. 19	John Stockton (Utah Jazz)
Nov. 20 – Nov. 26	Clyde Drexler (Portland Trail Blazers)
Nov. 27 – Dec. 3	Patrick Ewing (New York Knicks)
Dec. 4 – Dec. 10	Michael Jordan (Chicago Bulls)
Dec. 11 – Dec. 17	Chris Mullin (Golden State Warriors)
Dec. 18 – Dec. 23	Terry Cummings (San Antonio Spurs)
Dec. 25 – Dec. 30	Karl Malone (Utah Jazz)
Jan. 2 – Jan. 7	Terry Teagle (Golden State Warriors)
Jan. 8 – Jan. 14	Ron Harper (Los Angeles Clippers)
Jan. 15 – Jan. 21	Alvin Robertson (Milwaukee Bucks)
Jan. 22 – Jan. 28	Karl Malone (Utah Jazz)
Jan. 29 – Feb. 4	Tim Hardaway (Golden State Warriors)
Feb. 5 – Feb. 18	Tom Chambers (Phoenix Suns)
Feb. 19 – Feb. 25	David Robinson (San Antonio Spurs)
Feb. 26 – Mar. 4	Akeem Olajuwon (Houston Rockets)
Mar. 5 – Mar. 11	Rony Seikaly (Miami Heat)
Mar. 12 – Mar. 18	Kevin Johnson (Phoenix Suns)
Mar. 19 – Mar. 25	David Robinson (San Antonio Spurs)
Mar. 26 – Apr. 1	Michael Jordan (Chicago Bulls)
Apr. 2 – Apr. 8	Charles Barkley (Philadelphia 76ers)
Apr. 9 – Apr. 15	Magic Johnson (Los Angeles Lakers)
Apr. 16 – Apr. 22	David Robinson (San Antonio Spurs)

=== Player of the month ===
The following players were named NBA Player of the Month.

Month	Player
November	Patrick Ewing (New York Knicks)
December	Michael Jordan (Chicago Bulls)
January	Karl Malone (Utah Jazz)
February	Magic Johnson (Los Angeles Lakers)
March	Michael Jordan (Chicago Bulls)
April	Akeem Olajuwon (Houston Rockets)

=== Rookie of the month ===
The following players were named NBA Rookie of the Month.

Month	Rookie
November	David Robinson (San Antonio Spurs)
December	David Robinson (San Antonio Spurs)
January	David Robinson (San Antonio Spurs)
February	David Robinson (San Antonio Spurs)
March	David Robinson (San Antonio Spurs)
April	David Robinson (San Antonio Spurs)

=== Coach of the month ===
The following coaches were named NBA Coach of the Month.

Month	Coach
November	Dick Versace (Indiana Pacers)
December	Stu Jackson (New York Knicks)
January	Jim Lynam (Philadelphia 76ers)
February	Cotton Fitzsimmons (Phoenix Suns)
March	Rick Adelman (Portland Trail Blazers)
April	Jimmy Rodgers (Boston Celtics)

== See also ==
- List of NBA regular season records
