= NBA steals leaders =

NBA steals leader may refer to:

- List of National Basketball Association annual steals leaders
- List of National Basketball Association career steals leaders
- List of National Basketball Association career playoff steals leaders
- List of National Basketball Association single-game steals leaders
