= List of NBA annual steals leaders =

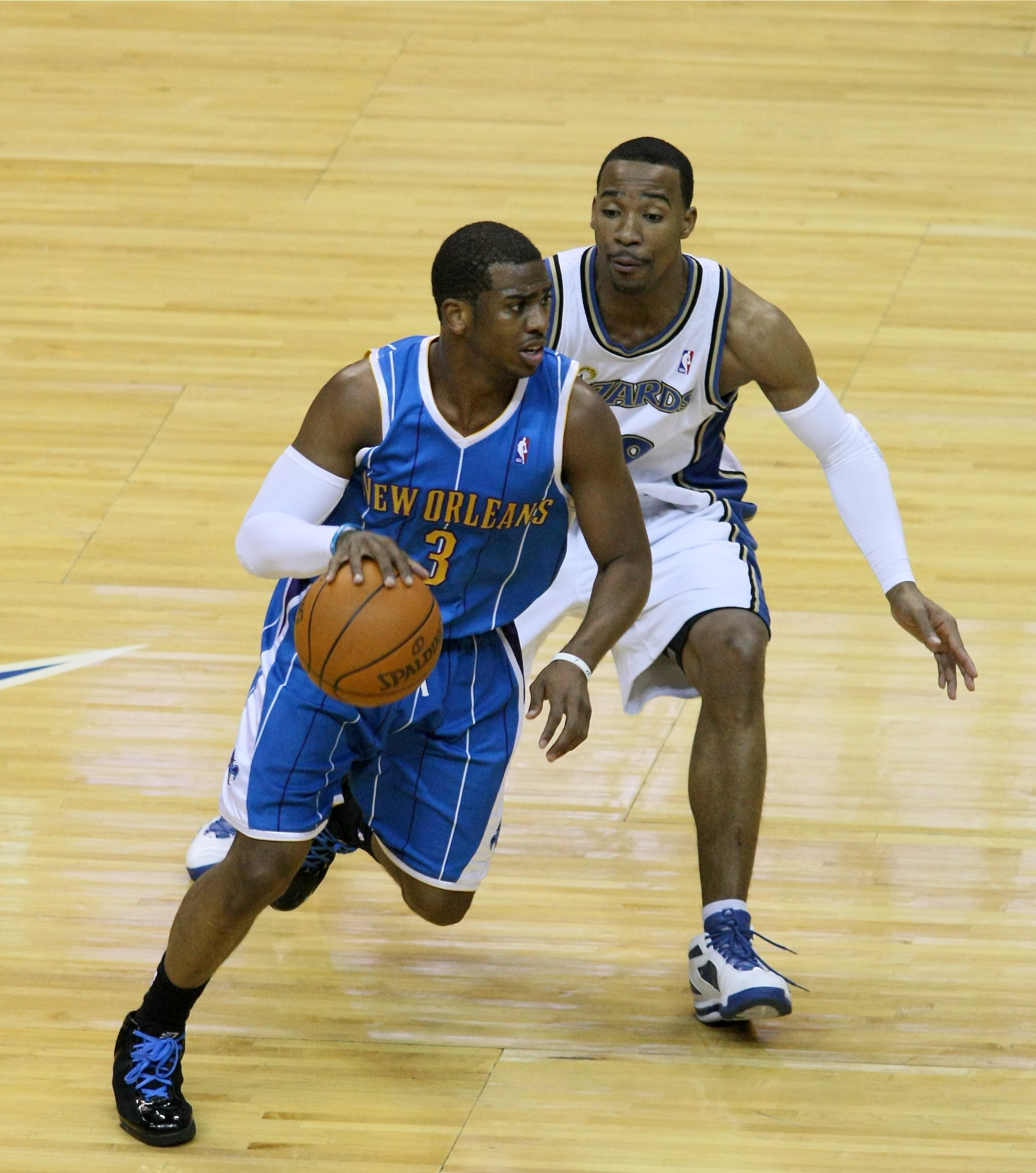
Chris Paul won six steal titles from 2008 to 2009 and from 2011 to 2014.

In basketball, a steal is a "defensive action" that causes the opponent to turn the ball over. The National Basketball Association's (NBA) steal title is awarded to the player with the highest steals per game average in a given season. The steal title was first recognized in the 1973–74 season when statistics on steals were first compiled. To qualify for the steal title, the player must appear in at least 58 games (out of 82). However, a player who appears in fewer than 58 games may qualify as annual steals leader if his steal total would have given him the greatest average, had he appeared in 58 games. This has been the requirement since the 2013–14 season.

Alvin Robertson holds the all-time records for total steals (301) and steals per game (3.67) in a season; achieved in the 1985–86 season. Among active players, Dyson Daniels had the highest season steal total (229) and the highest season steal average (3.01) in the 2024–25 season.

Chris Paul has won the most steal titles, with six. Micheal Ray Richardson, Robertson, Michael Jordan and Allen Iverson all follow with three. Magic Johnson, Mookie Blaylock, Baron Davis and John Stockton are the only other players to win more than one steal title, with two. Paul has won the most consecutive steal titles, with four. Four players have won both the steal title and the NBA championship in the same season: Rick Barry in 1975 with the Golden State Warriors, Johnson in 1982 with the Los Angeles Lakers, Jordan in 1993 with the Chicago Bulls and Draymond Green in 2017 with Golden State.

== Key ==
^	Denotes player who is still active in the NBA
*	Inducted into the Naismith Memorial Basketball Hall of Fame
†	Not yet eligible for Hall of Fame consideration (Note: A player is not eligible for induction into the Naismith Memorial Basketball Hall of Fame until he has been fully retired for three calendar years.)
‡	Denotes player who won the Defensive Player of the Year award that year
Player (X)	Denotes the number of times the player had been the steals leader up to and including that season

PG	Point guard	SG	Shooting guard	SF	Small forward	PF	Power forward	C	Center

== Annual leaders ==
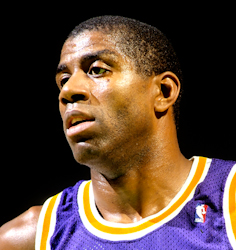
Magic Johnson led the league in steals for two consecutive seasons.

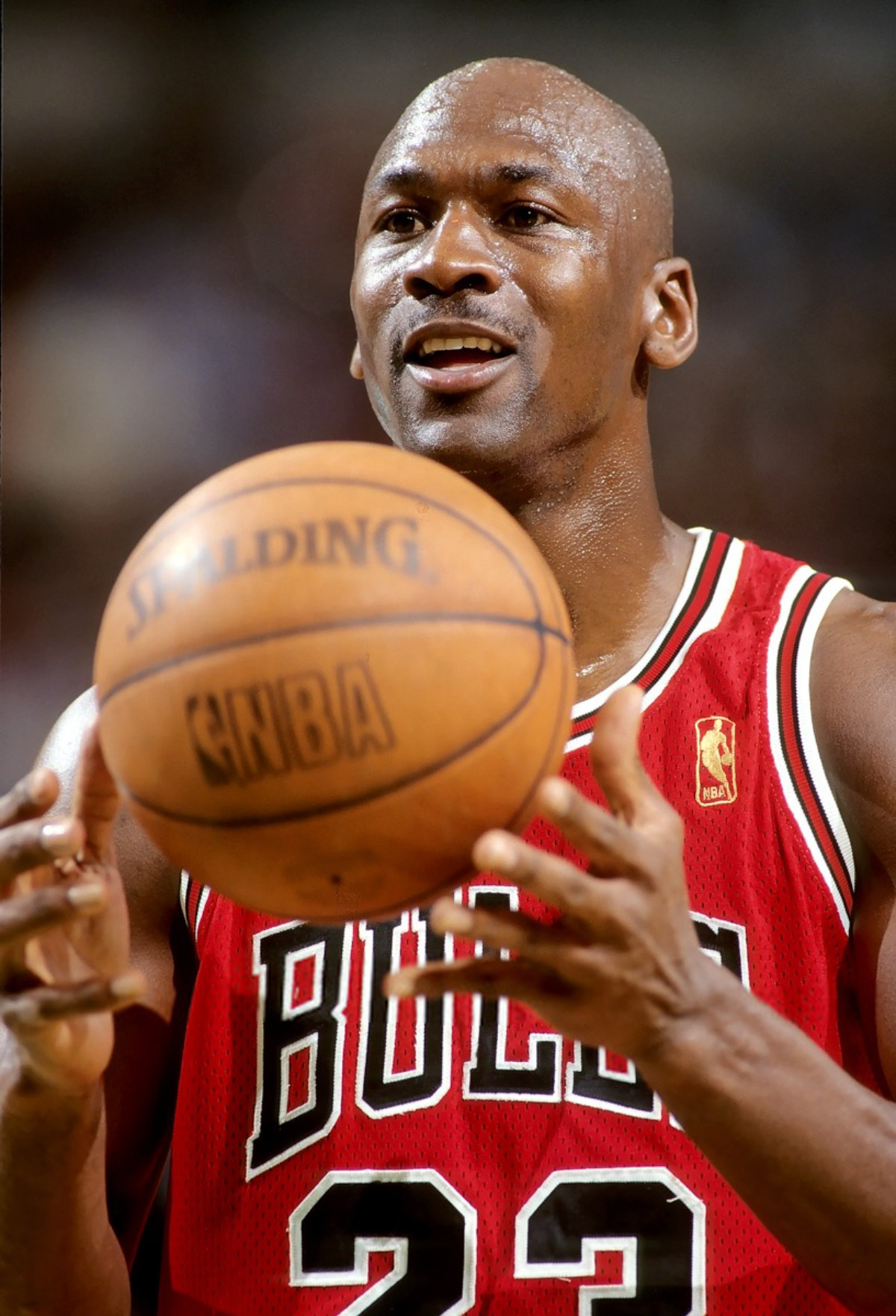
Michael Jordan was the steals leader in three separate seasons: 1988, 1990, and 1993.

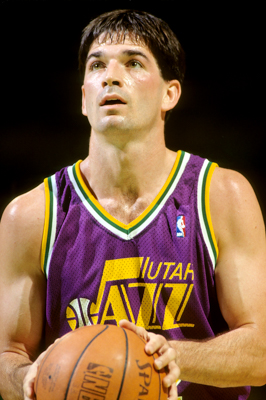
John Stockton was the steals leader in 1989 and 1992.

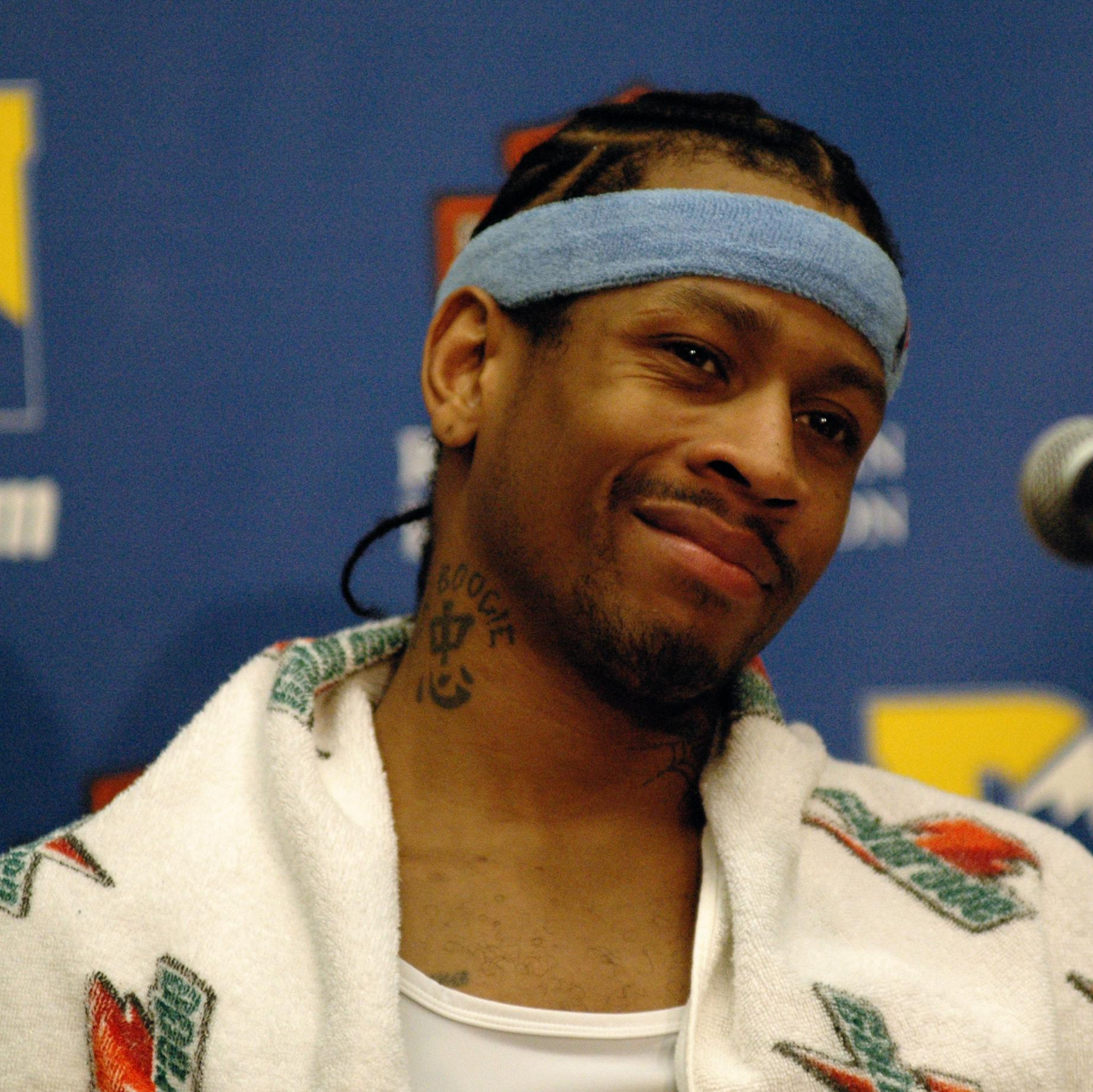
Allen Iverson won in three consecutive seasons.

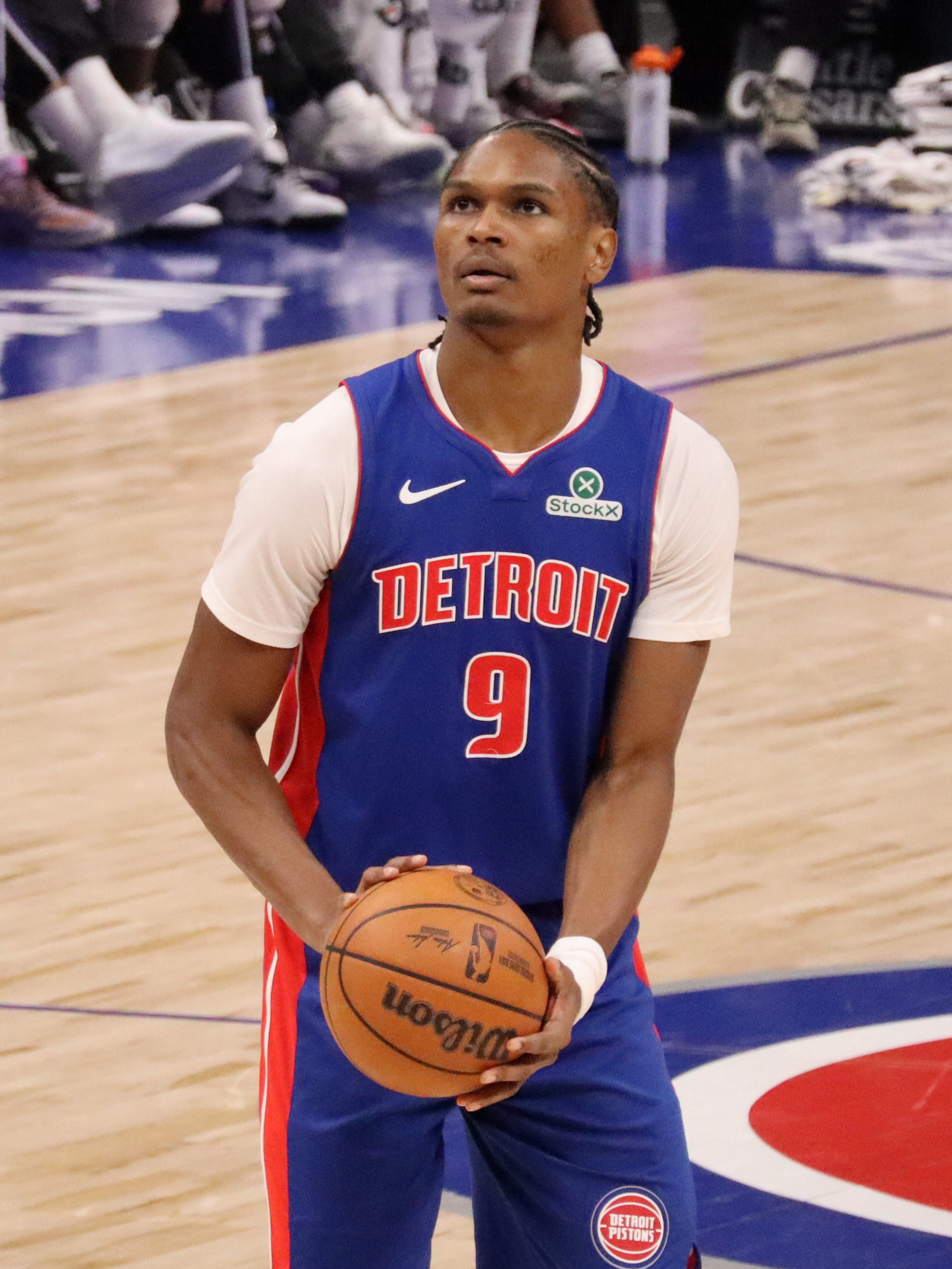
Ausar Thompson is the reigning steals leader in the NBA

Season	Player	Position (Note: The player's primary position is listed first.)	Team	Games played	Total steals	Steals per game	References
1973–74	Larry Steele	G/F	Portland Trail Blazers	81	217	2.67	
1974–75	Rick Barry*	F	Golden State Warriors	80	228	2.85	
1975–76	Slick Watts	G	Seattle SuperSonics	82	261	3.18	
1976–77	Don Buse	G	Indiana Pacers	81	281	3.47	
1977–78	Ron Lee	G	Phoenix Suns	82	225	2.74	
1978–79	M. L. Carr (Note: In the 1978–79 season, Eddie Jordan and Norm Nixon both had the highest steal total (201) but they were tied for second in steal average (2.45).)	F	Detroit Pistons	80	197	2.46	
1979–80	Micheal Ray Richardson	G	New York Knicks	82	265	3.23	
1980–81	Magic Johnson* (Note: In the 1980–81 season, Magic Johnson had only played in 37 games and ranked seventeenth in steal total. Micheal Ray Richardson had the highest total (232).)	G	Los Angeles Lakers	37	127	3.43	
1981–82	Magic Johnson* (2) (Note: In the 1981–82 season, Maurice Cheeks had the highest steal total (209) but was second in steal average (2.65).)	G	Los Angeles Lakers	78	208	2.67	
1982–83	Micheal Ray Richardson (2) (Note: In the 1982–83 season, Micheal Ray Richardson had only played in 64 games and ranked sixth in steal total. Rickey Green had the highest total (220).)	G	Golden State Warriors; New Jersey Nets	64	182	2.84	
1983–84	Rickey Green	G	Utah Jazz	81	215	2.65	
1984–85	Micheal Ray Richardson (3)	G	New Jersey Nets	82	243	2.96	
1985–86 ‡	Alvin Robertson	G	San Antonio Spurs	82	301	3.67	
1986–87	Alvin Robertson (2)	G	San Antonio Spurs	81	260	3.21	
1987–88 ‡	Michael Jordan*	G	Chicago Bulls	82	259	3.16	
1988–89	John Stockton*	G	Utah Jazz	82	263	3.21	
1989–90	Michael Jordan* (2)	G	Chicago Bulls	82	227	2.77	
1990–91	Alvin Robertson (3)	G	Milwaukee Bucks	81	246	3.04	
1991–92	John Stockton* (2)	G	Utah Jazz	82	244	2.98	
1992–93	Michael Jordan* (3)	G	Chicago Bulls	78	221	2.83	
1993–94	Nate McMillan	G	Seattle SuperSonics	73	216	2.96	
1994–95	Scottie Pippen*	F	Chicago Bulls	79	232	2.94	
1995–96 ‡	Gary Payton*	G	Seattle SuperSonics	81	231	2.85	
1996–97	Mookie Blaylock	G	Atlanta Hawks	78	212	2.72	
1997–98	Mookie Blaylock (2) (Note: In the 1997–98 season, Mookie Blaylock had only played in 70 games and ranked fourth in steal total. Brevin Knight had the highest total (196).)	G	Atlanta Hawks	70	183	2.61	
1998–99 (Note: The 1998–99 season was shortened to 50 games due to the league's lockout. The qualification of this season's steal title is to appear in at least 43 games (out of 50) or to have at least 76 steals.)	Kendall Gill	G	New Jersey Nets	50	134	2.68	
1999–00	Eddie Jones	G/F	Charlotte Hornets	72	192	2.67	
2000–01	Allen Iverson* (Note: In the 2000–01 season, Doug Christie had the highest steal total (183) but was third in steal average (2.26).)	G	Philadelphia 76ers	71	178	2.51	
2001–02	Allen Iverson* (2) (Note: In the 2001–02 season, Jason Kidd had the highest steal total (175) but was third in steal average (2.13).)	G	Philadelphia 76ers	60	168	2.80	
2002–03	Allen Iverson* (3)	G	Philadelphia 76ers	82	225	2.74	
2003–04	Baron Davis (Note: In the 2003–04 season, Shawn Marion had the highest steal total (167) but was second in steal average (2.11).)	G	New Orleans Hornets	67	158	2.36	
2004–05	Larry Hughes (Note: In the 2004–05 season, Allen Iverson had the highest steal total (180) but was second in steal average (2.40).)	G	Washington Wizards	61	176	2.89	
2005–06	Gerald Wallace (Note: In the 2005–06 season, Gerald Wallace had only played in 55 games and ranked tenth in steal total. Chris Paul had the highest total (175).)	F	Charlotte Bobcats	55	138	2.51	
2006–07	Baron Davis (2) (Note: In the 2006–07 season, Baron Davis had only played in 63 games and ranked sixth in steal total. Shawn Marion had the highest total (156).)	G	Golden State Warriors	63	135	2.14	
2007–08	Chris Paul†	G	New Orleans Hornets	80	217	2.71	
2008–09	Chris Paul† (2)	G	New Orleans Hornets	78	216	2.77	
2009–10	Rajon Rondo	G	Boston Celtics	81	189	2.33	
2010–11	Chris Paul† (3)	G	New Orleans Hornets	80	188	2.35	
2011–12 (Note: The 2011–12 season was shortened to 66 games due to the league's lockout. The qualification of this season's steal title is to appear in at least 56 games (out of 66) or to have at least 100 steals.)	Chris Paul† (4)	G	Los Angeles Clippers	60	152	2.53	
2012–13	Chris Paul† (5) (Note: In the 2012–13 season, Mike Conley Jr. had the highest steal total (174) but was third in steal average (2.2).)	G	Los Angeles Clippers	70	169	2.41	
2013–14	Chris Paul† (6) (Note: In the 2013–14 season, Ricky Rubio and Thaddeus Young both had higher steal totals (190 and 167 respectively) but they were second and third in steal average (2.3 and 2.1), respectively.)	G	Los Angeles Clippers	62	154	2.48	
2014–15 ‡	Kawhi Leonard^ (Note: In the 2014–15 season, Stephen Curry had the highest steal total (163) but was third in steal average tied with Tony Allen (2.0).)	F	San Antonio Spurs	64	148	2.31	
2015–16	Stephen Curry^	G	Golden State Warriors	79	169	2.14	
2016–17 ‡	Draymond Green^	F	Golden State Warriors	76	154	2.03	
2017–18	Victor Oladipo^{†}	G	Indiana Pacers	75	177	2.36	
2018–19	Paul George^	F	Oklahoma City Thunder	77	170	2.21	
2019–20	Ben Simmons^{†}	G	Philadelphia 76ers	57	119	2.09	
2020–21	Jimmy Butler^	F	Miami Heat	52	108	2.08	
2021–22	Dejounte Murray^	G	San Antonio Spurs	68	138	2.09	
2022–23	OG Anunoby^	F	Toronto Raptors	67	128	1.91	
2023–24	De'Aaron Fox^	G	Sacramento Kings	74	150	2.03	
2024–25	Dyson Daniels^	G	Atlanta Hawks	76	229	3.01	
2025–26	Ausar Thompson^	SF/SG	Detroit Pistons	73	146	2.00	

== Multiple-time leaders ==
Rank	Player	Team	Times leader	Years
1	Chris Paul	New Orleans Hornets (3) / Los Angeles Clippers (3)	6	2008, 2009, 2011, 2012, 2013, 2014
2	Allen Iverson	Philadelphia 76ers	3	2001, 2002, 2003
2	Michael Jordan	Chicago Bulls	3	1988, 1990, 1993
2	Micheal Ray Richardson	New York Knicks (1) / Golden State Warriors (1) / New Jersey Nets (1)	3	1980, 1983, 1985
2	Alvin Robertson	San Antonio Spurs (2) / Milwaukee Bucks (1)	3	1986, 1987, 1991
6	Mookie Blaylock	Atlanta Hawks	2	1997, 1998
6	Baron Davis	New Orleans Hornets (1) / Golden State Warriors (1)	2	2004, 2007
6	Magic Johnson	Los Angeles Lakers	2	1981, 1982
6	John Stockton	Utah Jazz	2	1989, 1992

== See also ==
- NBA records
- List of NBA career steals leaders
- List of NBA annual scoring leaders
- List of NBA annual 3-point scoring leaders
- List of NBA annual rebounding leaders
- List of NBA annual assists leaders
- List of NBA annual blocks leaders
