= Alvin Robertson =

American basketball player (born 1962)

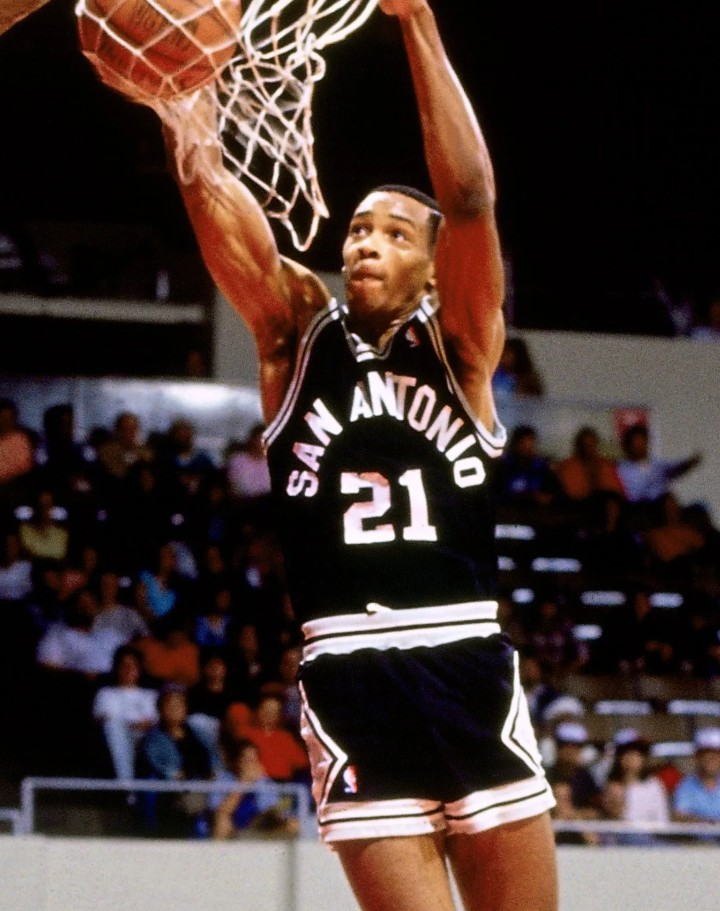
- Robertson with the San Antonio Spurs in 1986

Personal information
- Born: July 22, 1962 (age 64) Barberton, Ohio, U.S.
- Listed height: 6 ft 4 in (1.93 m)
- Listed weight: 208 lb (94 kg)

Career information
- High school: Barberton (Barberton, Ohio)
- College: Crowder College (1980–1981); Arkansas (1981–1984)
- NBA draft: 1984: 1st round, 7th overall pick
- Drafted by: San Antonio Spurs
- Playing career: 1984–1993, 1995–1997
- Position: Shooting guard
- Number: 21, 3, 7

Career history
- 1984–1989: San Antonio Spurs
- 1989–1993: Milwaukee Bucks
- 1993: Detroit Pistons
- 1995–1996: Toronto Raptors
- 1996–1997: Florida Beach Dogs

Career highlights
- 4× NBA All-Star (1986–1988, 1991); All-NBA Second Team (1986); NBA Defensive Player of the Year (1986); 2× NBA All-Defensive First Team (1987, 1991); 4× NBA All-Defensive Second Team (1986, 1988–1990); NBA Most Improved Player (1986); 3× NBA steals leader (1986, 1987, 1991); Second-team All-American – UPI (1984); Third-team All-American – AP (1984)

Career NBA statistics
- Points: 10,882 (14.0 ppg)
- Rebounds: 4,066 (5.2 rpg)
- Steals: 2,112 (2.7 spg)
- Stats at NBA.com
- Stats at Basketball Reference
Medals
Men's basketball
Representing United States
Olympic Games
Gold medal – first place	1984 Los Angeles	Team competition

Alvin Cyrrale Robertson (born July 22, 1962) is an American former professional basketball player who played in the National Basketball Association (NBA) for 10 seasons with the San Antonio Spurs, Milwaukee Bucks, Detroit Pistons, and Toronto Raptors. Robertson holds the record for the most steals per game played, averaging 2.71 steals per game for his career and is the only player to ever have a season of 300 or more steals which he accomplished in the 1985–86 season. He is one of only four players and the only guard in NBA history to have recorded a quadruple-double.

== Early life ==
Alvin Cyrrale Robertson was born on July 22, 1962, in Barberton, Ohio.

== College career ==
Robertson attended Crowder College from 1980 to 1981. He then attended Arkansas from 1981 to 1984.

== Professional career ==
=== San Antonio Spurs (1984–1989) ===
Best known for his defense, the 6'4" Robertson played for ten years after being selected by the San Antonio Spurs with the seventh pick in the 1984 NBA draft out of Crowder Junior College and the University of Arkansas. After five seasons with the Spurs, he finished out his career with the Milwaukee Bucks, the Detroit Pistons and the Toronto Raptors. He also was a member of the 1984 U.S. Olympic gold-medal team.

In 1986, Robertson became the inaugural winner of the NBA Most Improved Player Award. This also marked the first of four National Basketball Association All-Star Game appearances for the guard (the others coming in 1987, 1988, and 1991). He also won the NBA Defensive Player of the Year Award in 1986, and led the league in steals in 1986, 1987 and 1991. Robertson still holds the top career steals-per-game average in the NBA, with 2.71 per contest over 779 career games.

Robertson thrice led the league in steals. In 1985–86 he averaged a league-leading 3.7 steals per game, a major factor in his earning the Defensive Player of the Year honor and being selected second-team All-NBA, one of only seven players in Spurs' history to have been selected first, second or third-team All-NBA. He was a four-time All-Star.

Robertson led the Spurs in steals four of the five seasons he was with the club, three times averaging more than three per game. Though he played only five seasons in San Antonio, he ranks third in club history in total steals, with 1,129. During his San Antonio days, he also recorded a steal in a then-NBA-record 105 consecutive games; Chris Paul surpassed it by recording a steal in 108 consecutive games from 2007 to 2008.

A multi-dimensional player, Robertson is one of only four NBA players to record a quadruple-double (double digits in four statistical categories in a single game) when he registered 20 points, 11 rebounds, 10 assists, and 10 steals while playing for the Spurs against the Phoenix Suns on February 18, 1986. He is also the only non-center to record a quadruple-double, and the only player to do so with steals as the fourth category (the other three were with blocks).

=== Milwaukee Bucks (1989–1993) ===
On May 28, 1989, Robertson was traded by the Spurs with Cadillac Anderson and a 1989 2nd round draft pick (Frank Kornet was later selected) to the Milwaukee Bucks for Terry Cummings and a 1990 2nd round draft pick (Tony Massenburg was later selected). He would continue to be a premier defender on the Bucks, leading the league in steal percentage, an advanced metric, each of his three full seasons. He was also voted to the 1991 all-star team, the same season he led the league in steals for the third time in his career.

=== Detroit Pistons (1993) ===
Robertson finished the 1992–93 NBA season with the Detroit Pistons.

During the 1993–94 season, the Detroit Pistons traded Robertson to the Denver Nuggets in exchange for Mark Macon and Marcus Liberty. However, he never saw any playing time for the Nuggets due to pre-existing back injuries.

=== Toronto Raptors (1995–1996) ===
Robertson scored the first points in Toronto Raptors history. Ed Pinckney won the franchise's opening tip-off against the New Jersey Nets, Robertson hit a three-pointer, and the Raptors were ahead 3–0.

=== Florida Beach Dogs (1996–1997) ===
Robertson played for the Florida Beach Dogs from 1996 to 1997.

== Personal life ==
Robertson is the father of Tyrell Johnson, 2008 NFL 2nd round draft choice of the Minnesota Vikings. He is also the father of Elgin Cook, a professional basketball player. His brother, Ken Robertson, played basketball for Cleveland State University.

=== Legal problems ===
Robertson has had a history of off-court problems, during and after his career. He spent a month in jail during the 1990 NBA off-season on domestic assault charges against his then-wife.

In August 1997, he pleaded no contest to four misdemeanor charges of abusing a former girlfriend and was sentenced to one year in prison. During the trial he was accused of having kicked in an apartment door while his former girlfriend and her 8-year-old daughter were inside, then taking her wallet and knocking over a television set. Robertson allegedly returned a few hours later and ripped rings off her fingers, tore a watch off her wrist, slashed furniture, damaged clothing and tried to set a fire.

Robertson was arrested again in San Antonio in January 2007, on a variety of charges, several related to domestic violence.

He was arrested in 2010 on charges of sex trafficking, but was later cleared of all charges after learning the accusations were fabricated.

In August 2018, Robertson was arrested in San Antonio on an outstanding warrant for violating a protective order.

== NBA career statistics ==
Legend
GP	Games played	GS	Games started	MPG	Minutes per game
FG%	Field goal percentage	3P%	3-point field goal percentage	FT%	Free throw percentage
RPG	Rebounds per game	APG	Assists per game	SPG	Steals per game
BPG	Blocks per game	PPG	Points per game	**Bold**	Career high
*	Led the league	‡	NBA record

=== Regular season ===
Year	Team	GP	GS	MPG	FG%	3P%	FT%	RPG	APG	SPG	BPG	PPG
1984–85	San Antonio	79	9	21.3	.498	.364	.734	3.4	3.5	1.6	0.3	9.2
1985–86	San Antonio	**82**	**82**	35.1	**.514**	.276	**.795**	6.3	5.5	**3.7**‡	0.5	17.0
1986–87	San Antonio	81	78	33.3	.466	.271	.753	6.3	5.2	3.2*	0.4	17.7
1987–88	San Antonio	**82**	**82**	**36.3**	.465	.284	.748	6.1	**6.8**	3.0	**0.8**	**19.6**
1988–89	San Antonio	65	65	35.2	.483	.200	.723	5.9	6.0	3.0	0.6	17.3
1989–90	Milwaukee	81	81	32.1	.503	.154	.741	**6.9**	5.5	2.6	0.2	14.2
1990–91	Milwaukee	81	81	32.1	.485	**.365**	.757	5.7	5.5	3.0*	0.2	13.6
1991–92	Milwaukee	**82**	79	30.0	.430	.319	.763	4.3	4.4	2.6	0.4	12.3
1992–93	Milwaukee	39	32	27.3	.479	.309	.629	3.5	4.0	2.3	0.2	8.7
1992–93	Detroit	30	22	31.4	.434	.343	.690	4.4	3.6	2.2	0.3	9.3
1995–96	Toronto	77	69	32.2	.470	.272	.677	4.4	4.2	2.2	0.5	9.3
Career		779	680	31.7	.477	.295	.743	5.2	5.0	2.7‡	0.4	14.0
All-Star		4	2	15.0	.389	—	1.000	3.3	1.8	0.5	—	4.5

=== Playoffs ===
Year	Team	GP	GS	MPG	FG%	3P%	FT%	RPG	APG	SPG	BPG	PPG
1986	San Antonio	3	3	32.7	.276	—	**.846**	4.7	6.3	2.3	**0.3**	9.0
1988	San Antonio	3	3	**39.7**	.566	**.429**	.778	4.7	**9.3**	**4.0**	**0.3**	23.3
1990	Milwaukee	**4**	**4**	38.8	.522	.000	.706	5.8	4.8	2.3	0.0	23.5
1991	Milwaukee	3	3	39.3	**.592**	.333	.769	**6.0**	5.0	2.7	0.0	**23.7**
Career		13	13	37.7	.515	.353	.754	5.3	6.2	2.8	0.2	20.2

== Awards and achievements ==
- 1st place all-time for steals in a single season with 301.
- 1st place all-time in games with at least 5 steals with 142.
- 1st place all-time in games with at least 7 steals with 32.
- 1st place all-time in games with at least 9 steals with 4.
- 1st place all-time in games with at least 10 steals with 4.
- Only player in NBA history to record at least 300 steals in a single season.
- One of four players in NBA history to record a quadruple double.
  - Includes David Robinson, Nate Thurmond, and Hakeem Olajuwon.
- Only player in NBA history to record a quadruple double as a guard.

== See also ==
- List of NBA career steals leaders
- List of NBA single-season steals per game leaders
- List of NBA single-game steals leaders
