= Larry Steele =

American basketball player and coach

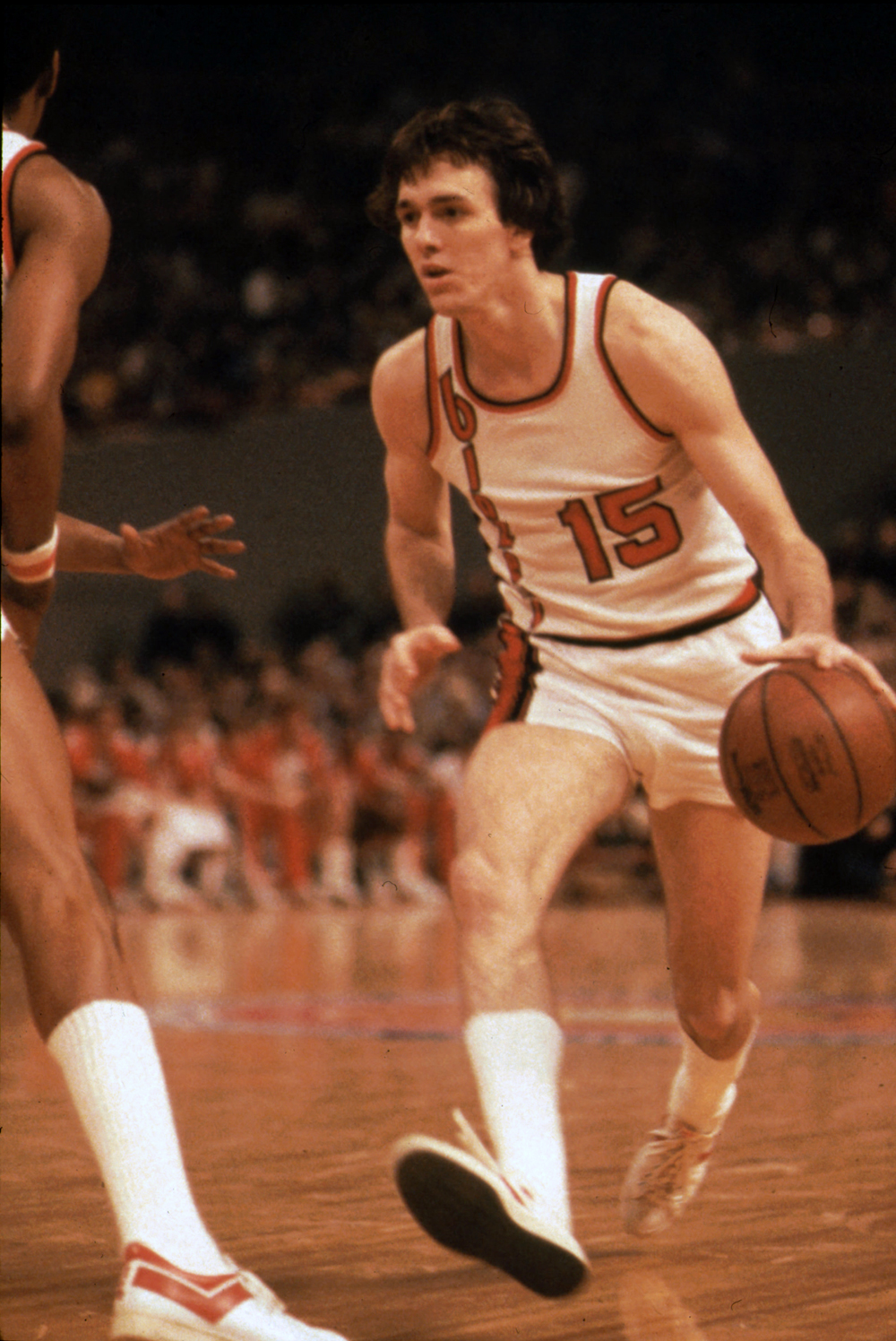
- Steele with the Portland Trail Blazers in 1976

Personal information
- Born: May 5, 1949 (age 77) Greencastle, Indiana, U.S.
- Listed height: 6 ft 5 in (1.96 m)
- Listed weight: 180 lb (82 kg)

Career information
- High school: Bainbridge (Bainbridge, Indiana)
- College: Kentucky (1968–1971)
- NBA draft: 1971: 3rd round, 37th overall pick
- Drafted by: Portland Trail Blazers
- Playing career: 1971–1980
- Position: Shooting guard / small forward
- Number: 15

Career history

Playing
- 1971–1980: Portland Trail Blazers

Coaching
- 1987–1994: University of Portland

Career highlights
- As player: NBA champion (1977); NBA steals leader (1974); No. 15 retired by Portland Trail Blazers; Second-team All-SEC (1971)

Career statistics
- Points: 5,009 (8.2 ppg)
- Rebounds: 1,781 (2.9 rpg)
- Assists: 1,719 (2.8 apg)
- Stats at NBA.com
- Stats at Basketball Reference

Larry Nelson Steele (born May 5, 1949) is an American former professional basketball player, best known for being on the Portland Trail Blazers team that won the 1977 NBA Finals.

== Early life ==
Born in Greencastle, Indiana, Steele grew up in Bainbridge, Indiana, and played collegiately at the University of Kentucky under coach Adolph Rupp. As a junior at Bainbridge High School, he had a high game of 46 points and 38 points as a high game during senior year. He scored a total of 1,646 high school points. His senior year he was selected All-County, All-Sectional, All-Regional, All- Semi-State, Indianapolis News 1st Team All-State, and a member of the Indiana All-Star Team. In 2003, he was inducted into the Indiana Basketball Hall of Fame.

=== College career ===
At the University of Kentucky, he was a three-year starter, averaging 13.1 points, 6.7 rebounds, and 3.9 assists per game. He was selected 1st Team All-SEC twice, Co-captain, MVP, Leadership Award, Hustle Award, led the UK team in assists and free throws. In 2003, he was inducted into the Indiana Basketball Hall of Fame. As a junior in 1970, Steele earned 3rd team UPI/Coaches All-SEC honors and in 1971 as a senior 2nd team AP and 3rd team UPI/Coaches All-SEC honors.

== NBA playing career ==
=== Portland Trail Blazers ===
He was drafted by the Trail Blazers in 1971, with the 2nd pick in the 3rd round (37th overall) and by the Kentucky Colonels in the 1971 American Basketball Association draft. In 1974 he was drafted again by the Kentucky Colonels in the 5th round of the ABA draft of NBA players. He joined the Trail Blazers at the start of the Blazers' second season and became a roster mainstay for nine years before knee injuries forced him into retirement at the end of the 1979–80 season.

Steele played his entire NBA career for the team (retiring from basketball at the end of the 1979–80 season). Steele led the NBA in steals in the 1973–74 NBA season—the first year steals were recorded by the league with 2.68 swipes per game. He played 20.7 MPG on the 1977 championship team (starting nine games) averaging a career high 10.3 points per game. During his nine-year NBA career, all with the Trail Blazers, he averaged 8.2 points, 2.9 assists, 1.39 steals and 24.2 minutes while starting 337 games. The Trail Blazers retired his jersey (15) on October 11, 1981.

== Personal life ==
After his playing days, he worked in the Blazers front office in marketing and served as a commentator with broadcaster Bill Schonely. Steele later worked as a broadcaster for the NBA on CBS and as a head coach at the University of Portland from 1987 to 1994. He currently runs a basketball camp in Vernonia, Oregon.

== NBA career statistics ==
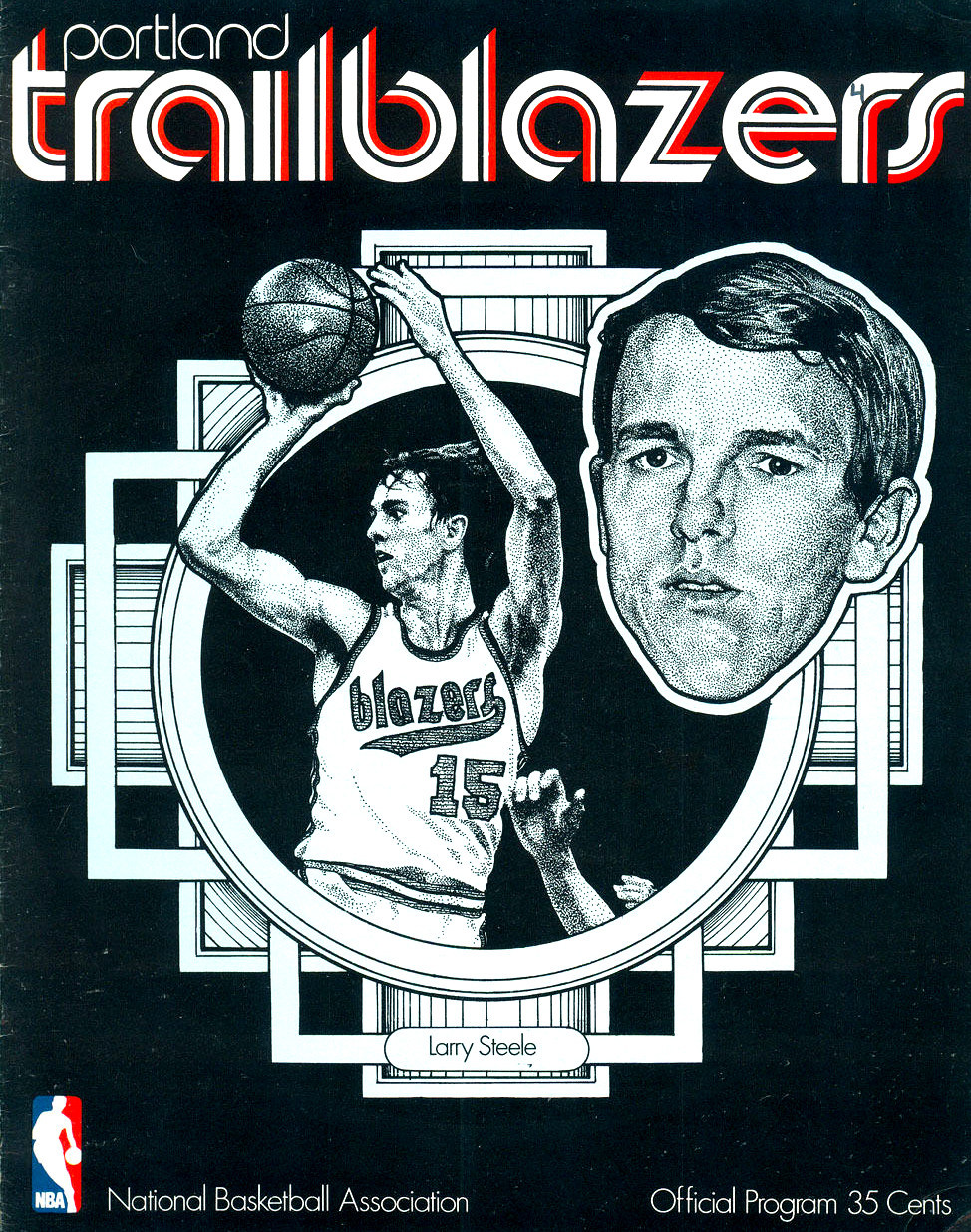
Steele on the cover of a Portland Trail Blazers program in 1971.

Legend
| GP | Games played | GS | Games started | MPG | Minutes per game |
| FG% | Field goal percentage | 3P% | 3-point field goal percentage | FT% | Free throw percentage |
| RPG | Rebounds per game | APG | Assists per game | SPG | Steals per game |
| BPG | Blocks per game | PPG | Points per game | **Bold** | Career high |
| † | Won an NBA championship | * | Led the league |

=== Regular season ===
| Year | Team | GP | GS | MPG | FG% | 3P% | FT% | RPG | APG | SPG | BPG | PPG |
|---|---|---|---|---|---|---|---|---|---|---|---|---|
| 1971–72 | Portland | 72 | - | 18.2 | .481 | - | .722 | **3.9** | 2.2 | - | - | 5.1 |
| 1972–73 | Portland | 66 | - | 19.7 | .483 | - | .798 | 2.3 | 2.4 | - | - | 5.9 |
| 1973–74 | Portland | **81** | - | **32.7** | .478 | - | .789 | 3.8 | 4.0 | **2.7*** | **0.4** | 9.7 |
| 1974–75 | Portland | 76 | - | 31.4 | **.548** | - | **.836** | 3.0 | 3.8 | 2.4 | 0.2 | 8.6 |
| 1975–76 | Portland | **81** | - | 29.4 | .495 | - | .759 | 3.6 | 4.0 | 2.1 | 0.2 | 9.9 |
| 1976–77† | Portland | **81** | - | 20.7 | .500 | - | .806 | 2.3 | 2.1 | 1.5 | 0.2 | **10.3** |
| 1977–78 | Portland | 65 | - | 17.4 | .470 | - | .820 | 1.7 | 1.3 | 0.9 | 0.1 | 8.0 |
| 1978–79 | Portland | 72 | - | 20.7 | .420 | - | .824 | 2.4 | 2.0 | 1.0 | 0.1 | 7.2 |
| 1979–80 | Portland | 16 | - | 27.9 | .425 | - | .815 | 2.8 | **4.2** | 1.6 | 0.1 | 9.1 |
| Career | | 610 | - | 24.2 | .483 | - | .796 | 2.9 | 2.8 | 1.8 | 0.2 | 8.2 |

=== Playoffs ===
| Year | Team | GP | GS | MPG | FG% | 3P% | FT% | RPG | APG | SPG | BPG | PPG |
|---|---|---|---|---|---|---|---|---|---|---|---|---|
| 1977† | Portland | **18** | - | 14.5 | .371 | - | .750 | 1.5 | 1.0 | 0.5 | 0.0 | 4.2 |
| 1978 | Portland | 6 | - | **31.8** | .417 | - | **.905** | **4.3** | **2.3** | 1.2 | **0.3** | 11.5 |
| 1979 | Portland | 3 | - | 24.3 | **.571** | - | .889 | 3.7 | **2.3** | **3.3** | 0.0 | **13.3** |
| **Career** | | 27 | - | 19.4 | .424 | - | .823 | 2.4 | 1.4 | 1.0 | 0.1 | 6.9 |

== Head coaching record ==
Record table
| Season | Team | Overall | Conference | Standing | Postseason |
|---|---|---|---|---|---|
Portland (West Coast Conference) (1987–1993)
| 1987–88 | Portland | 6-22 | 1-13 | 8th | |
| 1988–89 | Portland | 2-26 | 2-12 | T-7th | |
| 1989–90 | Portland | 11-17 | 7-7 | 4th | |
| 1990–91 | Portland | 5-23 | 3-11 | 8th | |
| 1991–92 | Portland | 10-18 | 3-11 | 8th | |
| 1992–93 | Portland | 9-18 | 3-11 | 7th | |
| 1993–94 | Portland | 13-17 | 6-8 | T-5th | |
| Portland: | | 56-141 | 25-73 | | |
| Total: | | 56-141 | | | |
National champion Postseason invitational champion Conference regular season champion Conference regular season and conference tournament champion Division regular season champion Division regular season and conference tournament champion Conference tournament champion

== See also ==
- List of National Basketball Association players with most steals in a game
