= Steal (basketball) =

Term in basketball referring to a legal turnover

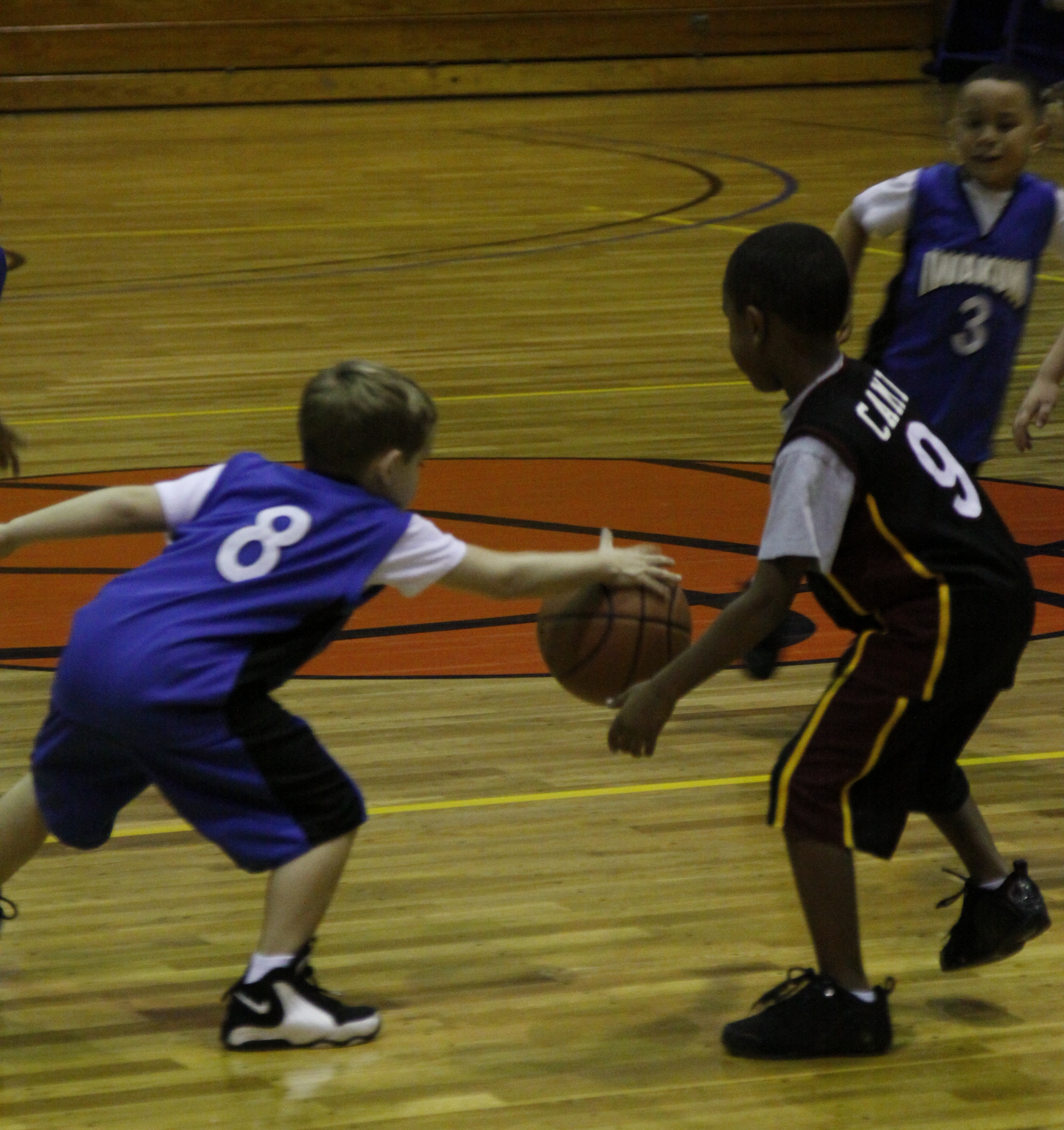
A young defender (left) steals the basketball from an opposing ballhandler

In basketball, a steal occurs when a defensive player legally causes a turnover by their positive, aggressive action(s). This can be done by deflecting and controlling, or by catching the opponent's pass or dribble of an offensive player. The defender must not touch the offensive player's hands or otherwise a foul is called.

Steals are credited to the defensive player who first causes the turnover, even if they do not end up with possession of the live ball. To earn a steal, the defensive player must be the initiator of the action causing the turnover. Whenever a steal is recorded by a defensive player, an offensive player must be credited as committing a turnover.

Stealing the ball requires good anticipation, speed and fast reflexes, all common traits of good defenders. However, like blocked shots, steals are not always a perfect gauge of a player's defensive abilities. An unsuccessful steal can result in the defender being out of position and unable to recover in time, allowing the offense to score. Therefore, attempting to steal is a gamble. Steals, though risky, can pay off greatly, because they often trigger a fast break for the defensive team.

There is no prototypical position from which a player may get many steals. While smaller, quicker guards tend to accumulate the most steals, there are many exceptions. For example, forward Rick Barry led the NBA in steals in 1974–75, and for many years center Hakeem Olajuwon led his team in the category, consistently ranking among the league's leaders, and is the only center ranked in the top 10 all-time in steals. Karl Malone, a power forward, is currently number eleven.

== NBA steals records ==
Steals were first recorded in the NBA in the 1973–74 season, while the rival ABA league first recorded steals during the same season.

Kendall Gill and Larry Kenon are tied for most steals in a regular season NBA game with eleven. Kenon's was recorded on December 26, 1976 while Gill recorded his on April 3, 1999.

The most steals by a player in an NBA season is 301 by Alvin Robertson in 1985–86.

The NBA's all-time leader for steals is John Stockton with 3,265 in his career.

The NBA leader in steals per game (SPG) is Robertson with an average of 2.71 (career, 1250 steals minimum) and 3.67 (season, 125 minimum).

Baron Davis is the all-time playoff leader in steals per game for a career with 2.28 SPG.

Maurice Cheeks in the 1979 Playoffs averaged a playoff record 4.11 SPG.

== WNBA steals records ==
The highest season average is held by Teresa Weatherspoon with 3.33 steals per game.

With 10 steals, Ticha Penicheiro holds the record for most steals in one game.

Tamika Catchings recorded the most steals in her career with 1,074 in 457 games.

== Notable players in the NBA ==
Some of the greatest defensive specialists in the steals category in the NBA include:

- Hakeem Olajuwon - ranking in the top 10 All-Time in both steals and blocks.
- Walt Frazier – renowned for his masterful defense, which culminated around his ability to deflect dribbling and passes using his incredibly quick hands. Steals were not recorded during the early part of his career. Frazier once made 8 consecutive steals during a third quarter against Atlanta in 1971.
- Allen Iverson – led the league in steals three times (consecutively); most steals in a playoff game.
- Michael Jordan – led the league in steals and steals per game three times, #3 all-time in career steals and #3 all-time in steals per game. #2 all-time in career steals in the playoffs behind Scottie Pippen.
- Chris Paul – holds the NBA record for most consecutive games with a steal, led the league in steals and steals per game six times.
- Michael Ray Richardson – led the league in steals three times; #2 all-time in steals per game.
- Alvin Robertson – led the league in steals and steals per game three times, #9 all-time in career steals and #1 all-time in steals per game.
- John Stockton – led the league in steals twice, #1 all-time in career steals and #6 in steals per game.
- Jerry West – is widely known for his ability to execute steals, but the statistic was not recorded until his final season. West was the first player to officially record 10 steals in a game.
- Clyde Drexler – Drexler had 2,207 steals in his 15-year career with the Portland Trail Blazers and Houston Rockets. He is #7 all-time in career steals.

== Notable players in the WNBA ==
- Tamika Catchings – most steals in the league with 1,074 in 457 games.

== See also ==
- List of NBA regular season records
- List of National Basketball Association career steals leaders
- List of National Basketball Association season steals leaders
- List of National Basketball Association players with most steals in a game
- List of WNBA regular season records
- List of WNBA career steals leaders
- List of WNBA annual steals leaders
