= List of NBA career steals leaders =

NBA career steals leaders

This article provides two lists:

A list of National Basketball Association players by total career regular season steals. (Note: The National Basketball Association did not record steal statistics until the 1973–74 NBA season.)

A progressive list of steals leaders showing how the record has increased through the years.

== Steals leaders ==
This is a list of National Basketball Association players by total career regular season leaders in steals.

^	Active NBA player
*	Inducted into the Naismith Memorial Basketball Hall of Fame
†	Not yet eligible for Hall of Fame consideration (Note: A player is not eligible for induction into the Naismith Memorial Basketball Hall of Fame until he has been fully retired for two calendar years.)
§	1st time eligible for Hall of Fame in 2027

Statistics accurate as of November 18, 2026.

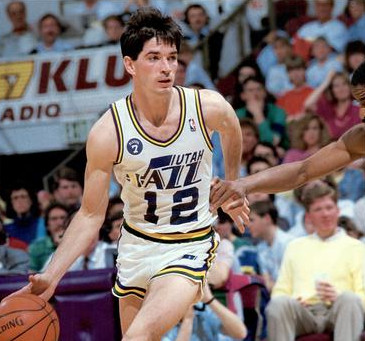
John Stockton has the most steals in NBA history. Stockton is also the all-time leader in assists.

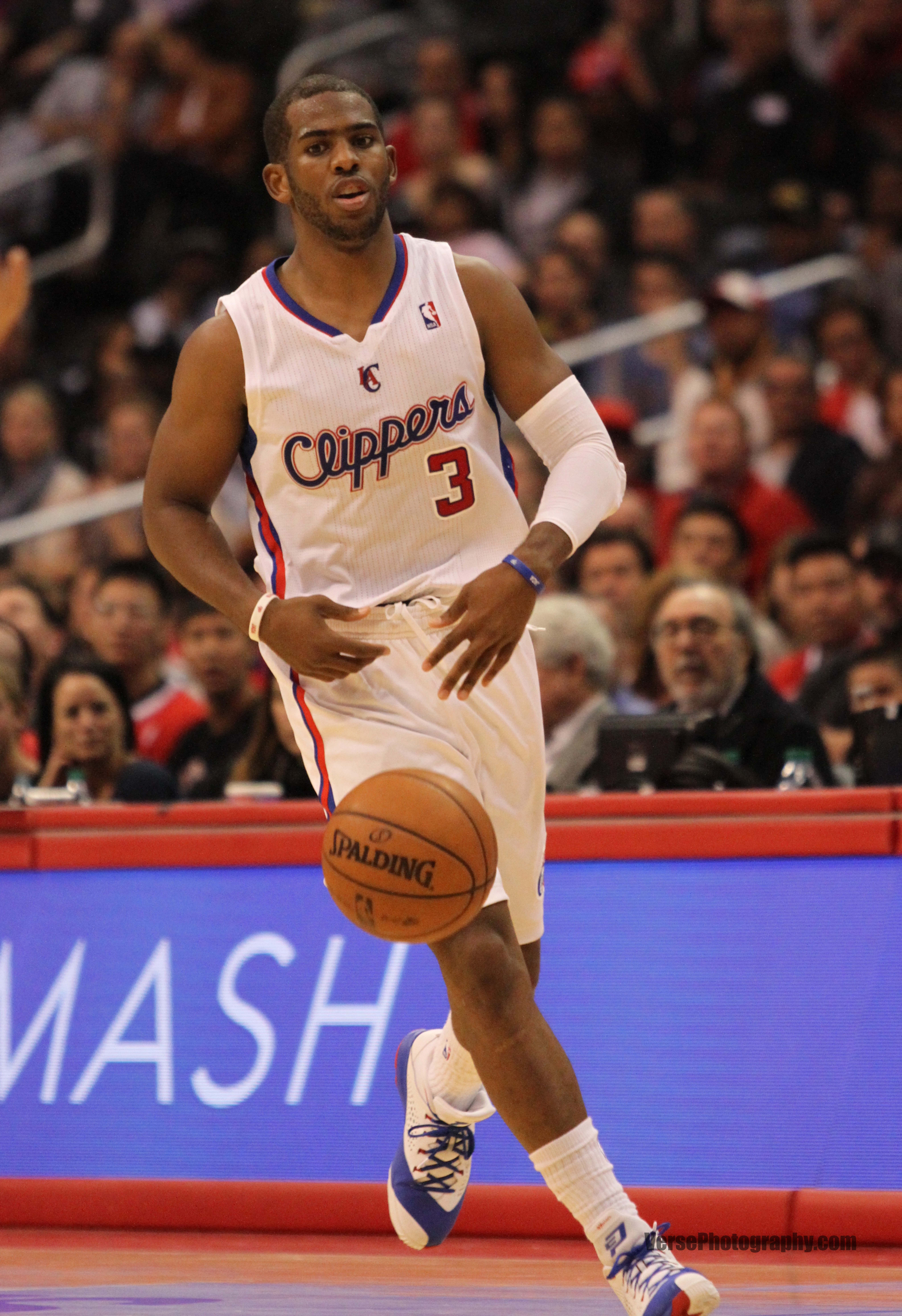
Chris Paul has the second-most steals and the second-most assists in NBA history.

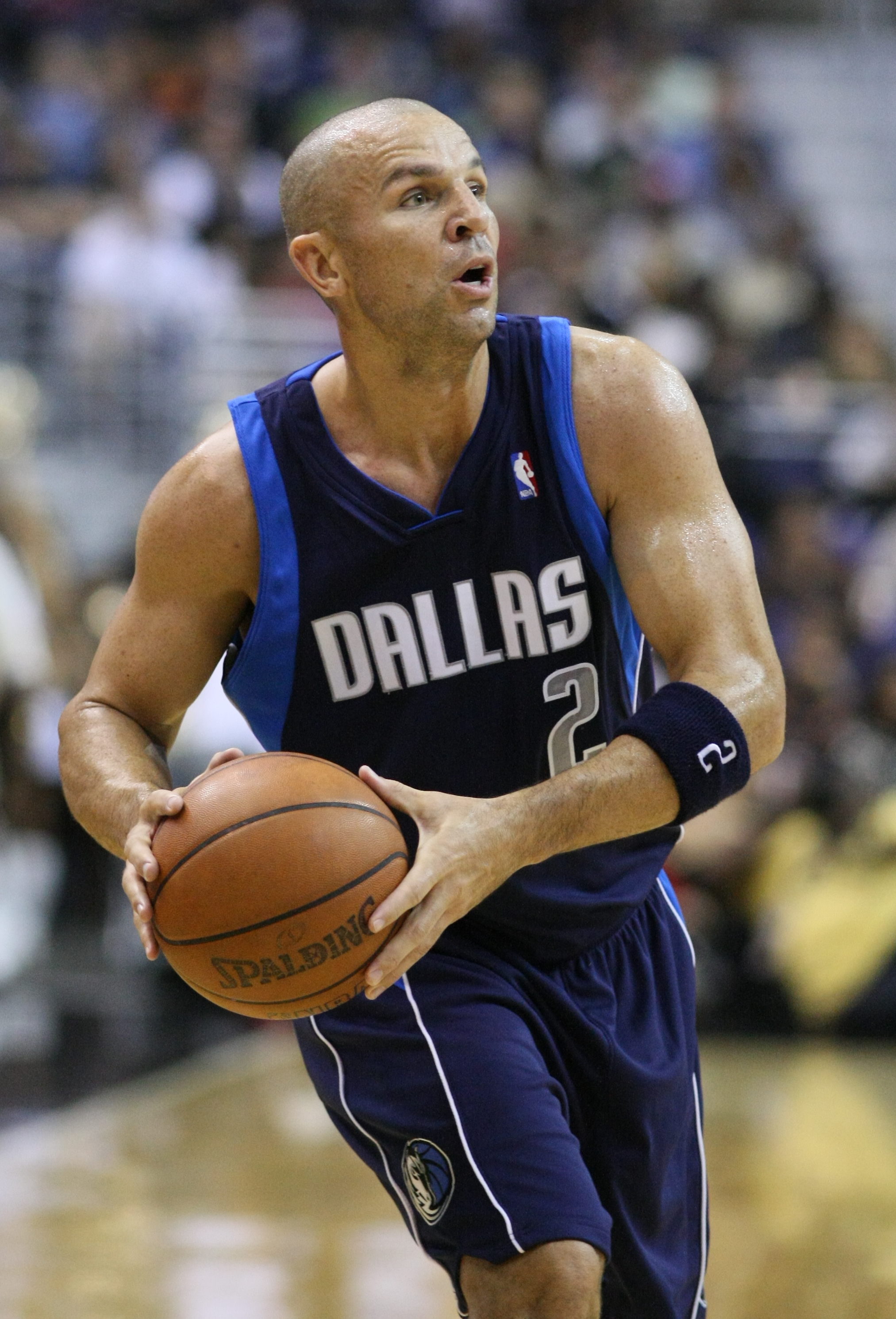
Jason Kidd has the third-most steals and the fourth-most assists in NBA history.

Rank	Player	Position(s)	Team(s) played for (years) (Note: American Basketball Association (ABA) teams other than those admitted into the NBA in 1976 are not included; each year is linked to an article about that particular NBA season.)	Total steals	Games played (Note: Games played in prior seasons where steals were not recorded are not included in total games played nor are they used in calculating the per game average.)	Steals per game average (Note: Average is rounded to the nearest hundredth and its calculation does not include games played in seasons before steals were officially recorded.)
1	John Stockton*	PG	Utah Jazz (1984–2003)	3,265	1,504	2.17
2	Chris Paul^{†}	PG	New Orleans Hornets (2005–2011); Los Angeles Clippers (2011–2017, 2025–2026); Houston Rockets (2017–2019); Oklahoma City Thunder (2019–2020); Phoenix Suns (2020–2023); Golden State Warriors (2023–2024); San Antonio Spurs (2024–2025)	2,728	1,370	1.99
3	Jason Kidd*	PG	Dallas Mavericks (1994–1996, 2008–2012); Phoenix Suns (1996–2001); New Jersey Nets (2001–2008); New York Knicks (2012–2013)	2,684	1,391	1.93
4	Michael Jordan*	SG	Chicago Bulls (1984–1993, 1995–1998); Washington Wizards (2001–2003)	2,514	1,072	2.35
5	Gary Payton*	PG	Seattle SuperSonics (1990–2003); Milwaukee Bucks (2003); Los Angeles Lakers (2003–2004); Boston Celtics (2004–2005); Miami Heat (2005–2007)	2,445	1,335	1.83
6	LeBron James^	SF	Cleveland Cavaliers (2003–2010, 2014–2018); Miami Heat (2010–2014); Los Angeles Lakers (2018–2026); Philadelphia 76ers (2026–present)	2,430	1,634	1.49
7	Maurice Cheeks*	PG	Philadelphia 76ers (1978–1989); San Antonio Spurs (1989–1990); New York Knicks (1990–1991); Atlanta Hawks (1991–1992); New Jersey Nets (1993)	2,310	1,101	2.10
8	Scottie Pippen*	SF	Chicago Bulls (1987–1998, 2003–2004); Houston Rockets (1999); Portland Trail Blazers (1999–2003)	2,307	1,178	1.96
9	Clyde Drexler*	SG	Portland Trail Blazers (1983–1995); Houston Rockets (1995–1998)	2,207	1,086	2.03
10	Hakeem Olajuwon*	C	Houston Rockets (1984–2001); Toronto Raptors (2001–2002)	2,162	1,238	1.75
11	Alvin Robertson	SG	San Antonio Spurs (1984–1989); Milwaukee Bucks (1989–1993); Detroit Pistons (1993); Toronto Raptors (1995–1996)	2,112	779	2.71
12	Karl Malone*	PF	Utah Jazz (1985–2003); Los Angeles Lakers (2003–2004)	2,085	1,476	1.41
13	Mookie Blaylock	PG	New Jersey Nets (1989–1992); Atlanta Hawks (1992–1999); Golden State Warriors (1999–2002)	2,075	889	2.33
14	Russell Westbrook^{†}	PG	Oklahoma City Thunder (2008–2019); Houston Rockets (2019–2020); Washington Wizards (2020–2021); Los Angeles Lakers (2021–2023); Los Angeles Clippers (2023–2024); Denver Nuggets (2024–2025); Sacramento Kings (2025–2026)	2,038	1,301	1.57
15	Allen Iverson*	SG/PG	Philadelphia 76ers (1996–2006, 2009–2010); Denver Nuggets (2006–2008); Detroit Pistons (2008–2009); Memphis Grizzlies (2009)	1,983	914	2.17
16	Derek Harper	PG	Dallas Mavericks (1983–1994, 1996–1997); New York Knicks (1994–1996); Orlando Magic (1997–1998); Los Angeles Lakers (1999)	1,957	1,199	1.63
17	Kobe Bryant*	SG	Los Angeles Lakers (1996–2016)	1,944	1,346	1.44
18	Isiah Thomas*	PG	Detroit Pistons (1981–1994)	1,861	979	1.90
19	Kevin Garnett*	PF	Minnesota Timberwolves (1995–2007, 2015–2016); Boston Celtics (2007–2013); Brooklyn Nets (2013–2015)	1,859	1,462	1.27
20	James Harden^	SG/PG	Oklahoma City Thunder (2009–2012); Houston Rockets (2012–2021); Brooklyn Nets (2021–2022); Philadelphia 76ers (2022–2023); Los Angeles Clippers (2023–2026); Cleveland Cavaliers (2026–present)	1,808	1,236	1.46
21	Andre Iguodala	SF/SG	Philadelphia 76ers (2004–2012); Denver Nuggets (2012–2013); Golden State Warriors (2013–2019, 2021–2023); Miami Heat (2020–2021)	1,765	1,231	1.43
22	Shawn Marion	SF/PF	Phoenix Suns (1999–2008); Miami Heat (2008–2009); Toronto Raptors (2009); Dallas Mavericks (2009–2014); Cleveland Cavaliers (2014–2015)	1,759	1,163	1.53
23	Paul Pierce*	SF/SG	Boston Celtics (1998–2013); Brooklyn Nets (2013–2014); Washington Wizards (2014–2015); Los Angeles Clippers (2015–2017)	1,752	1,343	1.30
24	Magic Johnson*	PG/SG	Los Angeles Lakers (1979–1991, 1996)	1,724	906	1.90
25	Metta Sandiford-Artest	SF	Chicago Bulls (1999–2002); Indiana Pacers (2002–2006); Sacramento Kings (2006–2008); Houston Rockets (2008–2009); Los Angeles Lakers (2009–2013, 2015–2017); New York Knicks (2013–2014)	1,721	991	1.74
26	Ron Harper	SG/PG	Cleveland Cavaliers (1986–1989); Los Angeles Clippers (1989–1994); Chicago Bulls (1994–1999); Los Angeles Lakers (1999–2001)	1,716	1,009	1.70
27	Fat Lever	PG/SG	Portland Trail Blazers (1982–1984); Denver Nuggets (1984–1990); Dallas Mavericks (1990–1994)	1,666	752	2.22
28	Charles Barkley*	PF	Philadelphia 76ers (1984–1992); Phoenix Suns (1992–1996); Houston Rockets (1996–2000)	1,648	1,073	1.54
29	Mike Conley^	PG	Memphis Grizzlies (2007–2019); Utah Jazz (2019–2023); Minnesota Timberwolves (2023–2026); Boston Celtics (2026–present)	1,640	1,230	1.33
30	Gus Williams	PG	Golden State Warriors (1975–1977); Seattle SuperSonics (1977–1984); Washington Bullets (1984–1986); Atlanta Hawks (1987)	1,638	825	1.99
31	Trevor Ariza	SF	New York Knicks (2004–2006); Orlando Magic (2006–2007); Los Angeles Lakers (2007–2009, 2021–2022); Houston Rockets (2009–2010, 2014–2018); New Orleans Hornets (2010–2012); Washington Wizards (2012–2014, 2018–2019); Phoenix Suns (2018); Sacramento Kings (2019–2020); Portland Trail Blazers (2020); Miami Heat (2021)	1,628	1,118	1.46
31	Paul George^	SF	Indiana Pacers (2010–2017); Oklahoma City Thunder (2017–2019); Los Angeles Clippers (2019–2024); Philadelphia 76ers (2024–2026); Boston Celtics (2026–present)	1,628	958	1.70
33	Hersey Hawkins	SG	Philadelphia 76ers (1988–1993); Charlotte Hornets (1993–1995, 2000–2001); Seattle SuperSonics (1995–1999); Chicago Bulls (1999–2000)	1,622	983	1.65
34	Eddie Jones	SG	Los Angeles Lakers (1994–1999); Charlotte Hornets (1999–2000); Miami Heat (2000–2005, 2007); Memphis Grizzlies (2005–2007); Dallas Mavericks (2007–2008)	1,620	954	1.70
34	Dwyane Wade*	SG	Miami Heat (2003–2016, 2018–2019); Chicago Bulls (2016–2017); Cleveland Cavaliers (2017–2018)	1,620	1,054	1.54
36	Rod Strickland	PG	New York Knicks (1988–1990); San Antonio Spurs (1990–1992); Portland Trail Blazers (1992–1996, 2001); Washington Bullets/Wizards (1996–2001); Miami Heat (2001–2002); Minnesota Timberwolves (2002–2003); Orlando Magic (2003–2004); Toronto Raptors (2004); Houston Rockets (2005)	1,616	1,094	1.48
37	Thaddeus Young	PF	Philadelphia 76ers (2007–2014); Minnesota Timberwolves (2014–2015); Brooklyn Nets (2015–2016); Indiana Pacers (2016–2019); Chicago Bulls (2019–2021); San Antonio Spurs (2021–2022); Toronto Raptors (2022–2024); Phoenix Suns (2024)	1,612	1,172	1.38
38	Stephen Curry^	PG	Golden State Warriors (2009–present)	1,611	1,079	1.49
39	Mark Jackson	PG	New York Knicks (1987–1992, 2001–2002); Los Angeles Clippers (1992–1994); Indiana Pacers (1994–1996, 1997–2000); Denver Nuggets (1996–1997); Toronto Raptors (2000–2001); Utah Jazz (2002–2003); Houston Rockets (2004)	1,608	1,296	1.24
40	Jason Terry	SG/PG	Atlanta Hawks (1999–2004); Dallas Mavericks (2004–2012); Boston Celtics (2012–2013); Brooklyn Nets (2013–2014); Houston Rockets (2014–2016); Milwaukee Bucks (2016–2018)	1,603	1,410	1.14
41	Terry Porter	PG	Portland Trail Blazers (1985–1995); Minnesota Timberwolves (1995–1998); Miami Heat (1999); San Antonio Spurs (1999–2002)	1,583	1,274	1.24
42	Doc Rivers	PG	Atlanta Hawks (1983–1991); Los Angeles Clippers (1991–1992); New York Knicks (1992–1994); San Antonio Spurs (1994–1996)	1,563	864	1.81
43	Larry Bird*	SF/PF	Boston Celtics (1979–1992)	1,556	897	1.73
44	Doug Christie	SG	Los Angeles Lakers (1993–1994); New York Knicks (1994–1996); Toronto Raptors (1996–2000); Sacramento Kings (2000–2005); Orlando Magic (2005); Dallas Mavericks (2005); Los Angeles Clippers (2007)	1,555	827	1.88
45	Andre Miller	PG	Cleveland Cavaliers (1999–2002); Los Angeles Clippers (2002–2003); Denver Nuggets (2003–2006, 2011–2014); Philadelphia 76ers (2006–2009); Portland Trail Blazers (2009–2011); Washington Wizards (2014–2015); Sacramento Kings (2015); Minnesota Timberwolves (2015–2016); San Antonio Spurs (2016)	1,546	1,304	1.19
46	Nate McMillan	PG/SG	Seattle SuperSonics (1986–1998)	1,544	796	1.94
47	Jrue Holiday^	PG	Philadelphia 76ers (2009–2013); New Orleans Pelicans (2013–2020); Milwaukee Bucks (2020–2023); Boston Celtics (2023–2025); Portland Trail Blazers (2025–present)	1,541	1,104	1.40
48	Jeff Hornacek	SG	Phoenix Suns (1986–1992); Philadelphia 76ers (1992–1994); Utah Jazz (1994–2000)	1,536	1,077	1.43
49	Vince Carter*	SG/SF	Toronto Raptors (1998–2004); New Jersey Nets (2004–2009); Orlando Magic (2009–2010); Phoenix Suns (2010–2011); Dallas Mavericks (2011–2014); Memphis Grizzlies (2014–2017); Sacramento Kings (2017–2018); Atlanta Hawks (2018–2020)	1,530	1,540	0.99
49	Baron Davis	PG	Charlotte Hornets (1999–2002); New Orleans Hornets (2002–2005); Golden State Warriors (2005–2008); Los Angeles Clippers (2008–2011); Cleveland Cavaliers (2011); New York Knicks (2011–2012)	1,530	835	1.83
49	Chris Mullin*	SF/SG	Golden State Warriors (1985–1997, 2000–2001); Indiana Pacers (1997–2000)	1,530	986	1.55

== Progressive list of steals leaders ==
This is a progressive list of steals leaders showing how the record increased through the years.

^	Active NBA player
*	Inducted into the Naismith Memorial Basketball Hall of Fame
†	Not yet eligible for Hall of Fame consideration
§	Eligible for Hall of Fame in 2027

Statistics accurate as of November 18, 2026.

Team abbreviationsTeam(s) listed is the one player was on when he established the record.
ATL	Atlanta Hawks	GSW	Golden State Warriors	MIL	Milwaukee Bucks	OKC	Oklahoma City Thunder	SDC	San Diego Clippers
BOS	Boston Celtics	IND	Indiana Pacers	MIN	Minnesota Timberwolves	PHI	Philadelphia 76ers	SEA	Seattle SuperSonics
CHO	Charlotte Hornets	LAC	Los Angeles Clippers	NJN	New Jersey Nets	PHX	Phoenix Suns	TOR	Toronto Raptors
CHI	Chicago Bulls	LAL	Los Angeles Lakers	NOH	New Orleans Hornets	POR	Portland Trail Blazers	UTA	Utah Jazz
CLE	Cleveland Cavaliers	MEM	Memphis Grizzlies	NOP	New Orleans Pelicans	SAC	Sacramento Kings	WAS	Washington Wizards
DAL	Dallas Mavericks	MIA	Miami Heat	NYK	New York Knicks	SAS	San Antonio Spurs	WSB	Washington Bullets

Steals leaders at the end of every season
Season	Year-by-year leader	Steals	Active player leader	Steals	Career record	Steals	Single-season record	Steals	Season
1973–74	Larry SteelePOR	217	Larry SteelePOR	217	Larry SteelePOR	217	Larry SteelePOR	217	1973–74
1974–75	Rick Barry*GSW	228	Larry SteelePOR	400	Larry SteelePOR	400	Rick Barry*GSW	228	1974–75
1975–76	Slick WattsSEA	261	Rick Barry*GSW	599	Rick Barry*GSW	599	Slick WattsSEA	261	1975–76
1976–77	Don BuseIND	281	Slick WattsSEA	780	Slick WattsSEA	780	Don BuseIND	281	1976–77
1977–78	Ron LeePHX	225	Rick Barry*GSW	929	Rick Barry*GSW	929	Don BuseIND	281	1977–78
1978–79	Norm NixonLAL; Eddie JordanNJN	201	Rick Barry*GSW	1,024	Rick Barry*GSW	1,024	Don BuseIND	281	1978–79
1979–80	Micheal Ray RichardsonNYK	265	Randy Smith; CLE 1979–81; NYK 1981–82; SDC & ATL 1982–83	1,143	Randy Smith; CLE 1979–81; NYK 1981–82; SDC & ATL 1982–83	1,143	Don BuseIND	281	1979–80
1980–81	Micheal Ray RichardsonNYK	232	Randy Smith; CLE 1979–81; NYK 1981–82; SDC & ATL 1982–83	1,256	Randy Smith; CLE 1979–81; NYK 1981–82; SDC & ATL 1982–83	1,256	Don BuseIND	281	1980–81
1981–82	Micheal Ray RichardsonNYK	213	Randy Smith; CLE 1979–81; NYK 1981–82; SDC & ATL 1982–83	1,347	Randy Smith; CLE 1979–81; NYK 1981–82; SDC & ATL 1982–83	1,347	Don BuseIND	281	1981–82
1982–83	Rickey GreenUTA	220	Randy Smith; CLE 1979–81; NYK 1981–82; SDC & ATL 1982–83	1,403	Randy Smith; CLE 1979–81; NYK 1981–82; SDC & ATL 1982–83	1,403	Don BuseIND	281	1982–83
1983–84	Rickey GreenUTA	215	Gus Williams; SEA 1983–84; WSB 1984–86	1,347	Randy Smith; CLE 1979–81; NYK 1981–82; SDC & ATL 1982–83	1,403	Don BuseIND	281	1983–84
1984–85	Micheal Ray RichardsonNJN	243	Gus Williams; SEA 1983–84; WSB 1984–86	1,525	Gus WilliamsWSB	1,525	Don BuseIND	281	1984–85
1985–86	Alvin RobertsonSAS	301	Gus Williams; SEA 1983–84; WSB 1984–86	1,621	Gus WilliamsWSB	1,621	Alvin RobertsonSAS	301	1985–86
1986–87	Alvin RobertsonSAS	260	Maurice Cheeks*; PHI 1986–89; SAS 1989–90; NYK 1990–91; ATL 1991–92; NJN 1992–93	1,670	Maurice Cheeks*; PHI 1986–89; SAS 1989–90; NYK 1990–91; ATL 1991–92; NJN 1992–93	1,670	Alvin RobertsonSAS	301	1986–87
1987–88	Michael Jordan*CHI	259	Maurice Cheeks*; PHI 1986–89; SAS 1989–90; NYK 1990–91; ATL 1991–92; NJN 1992–93	1,837	Maurice Cheeks*; PHI 1986–89; SAS 1989–90; NYK 1990–91; ATL 1991–92; NJN 1992–93	1,837	Alvin RobertsonSAS	301	1987–88
1988–89	John Stockton*UTA	263	Maurice Cheeks*; PHI 1986–89; SAS 1989–90; NYK 1990–91; ATL 1991–92; NJN 1992–93	1,942	Maurice Cheeks*; PHI 1986–89; SAS 1989–90; NYK 1990–91; ATL 1991–92; NJN 1992–93	1,942	Alvin RobertsonSAS	301	1988–89
1989–90	Michael Jordan*CHI	227	Maurice Cheeks*; PHI 1986–89; SAS 1989–90; NYK 1990–91; ATL 1991–92; NJN 1992–93	2,066	Maurice Cheeks*; PHI 1986–89; SAS 1989–90; NYK 1990–91; ATL 1991–92; NJN 1992–93	2,066	Alvin RobertsonSAS	301	1989–90
1990–91	Alvin RobertsonMIL	246	Maurice Cheeks*; PHI 1986–89; SAS 1989–90; NYK 1990–91; ATL 1991–92; NJN 1992–93	2,194	Maurice Cheeks*; PHI 1986–89; SAS 1989–90; NYK 1990–91; ATL 1991–92; NJN 1992–93	2,194	Alvin RobertsonSAS	301	1990–91
1991–92	John Stockton*UTA	244	Maurice Cheeks*; PHI 1986–89; SAS 1989–90; NYK 1990–91; ATL 1991–92; NJN 1992–93	2,277	Maurice Cheeks*; PHI 1986–89; SAS 1989–90; NYK 1990–91; ATL 1991–92; NJN 1992–93	2,277	Alvin RobertsonSAS	301	1991–92
1992–93	Michael Jordan*CHI	221	Maurice Cheeks*; PHI 1986–89; SAS 1989–90; NYK 1990–91; ATL 1991–92; NJN 1992–93	2,310	Maurice Cheeks*; PHI 1986–89; SAS 1989–90; NYK 1990–91; ATL 1991–92; NJN 1992–93	2,310	Alvin RobertsonSAS	301	1992–93
1993–94	Nate McMillanSEA	216	John Stockton*UTA	2,031	Maurice Cheeks*; PHI 1986–89; SAS 1989–90; NYK 1990–91; ATL 1991–92; NJN 1992–93	2,310	Alvin RobertsonSAS	301	1993–94
1994–95	Scottie Pippen*CHI	232	John Stockton*UTA	2,225	Maurice Cheeks*; PHI 1986–89; SAS 1989–90; NYK 1990–91; ATL 1991–92; NJN 1992–93	2,310	Alvin RobertsonSAS	301	1994–95
1995–96	Gary Payton*SEA	231	John Stockton*UTA	2,365	John Stockton*UTA	2,365	Alvin RobertsonSAS	301	1995–96
1996–97	Mookie BlaylockATL	212	John Stockton*UTA	2,531	John Stockton*UTA	2,531	Alvin RobertsonSAS	301	1996–97
1997–98	Brevin KnightCLE	196	John Stockton*UTA	2,620	John Stockton*UTA	2,620	Alvin RobertsonSAS	301	1997–98
1998–99	Kendall GillNJN	134	John Stockton*UTA	2,701	John Stockton*UTA	2,701	Alvin RobertsonSAS	301	1998–99
1999–00	Eddie JonesCHO	192	John Stockton*UTA	2,844	John Stockton*UTA	2,844	Alvin RobertsonSAS	301	1999–00
2000–01	Doug ChristieSAC	183	John Stockton*UTA	2,976	John Stockton*UTA	2,976	Alvin RobertsonSAS	301	2000–01
2001–02	Jason Kidd*NJN	175	John Stockton*UTA	3,128	John Stockton*UTA	3,128	Alvin RobertsonSAS	301	2001–02
2002–03	Allen Iverson*PHI	225	John Stockton*UTA	3,265	John Stockton*UTA	3,265	Alvin RobertsonSAS	301	2002–03
2003–04	Shawn MarionPHX	167	Scottie Pippen*CHI	2,307	John Stockton*UTA	3,265	Alvin RobertsonSAS	301	2003–04
2004–05	Allen Iverson*PHI	180	Gary Payton*; BOS 2004–05; MIA 2005–07	2,331	John Stockton*UTA	3,265	Alvin RobertsonSAS	301	2004–05
2005–06	Chris Paul^{†}NOK	175	Gary Payton*; BOS 2004–05; MIA 2005–07	2,402	John Stockton*UTA	3,265	Alvin RobertsonSAS	301	2005–06
2006–07	Shawn MarionPHX	156	Gary Payton*; BOS 2004–05; MIA 2005–07	2,445	John Stockton*UTA	3,265	Alvin RobertsonSAS	301	2006–07
2007–08	Chris Paul^{†}NOH	217	Jason Kidd*; NJN 2007–08; DAL 2008–12; NYK 2012–13	2,038	John Stockton*UTA	3,265	Alvin RobertsonSAS	301	2007–08
2008–09	Chris Paul^{†}NOH	216	Jason Kidd*; NJN 2007–08; DAL 2008–12; NYK 2012–13	2,198	John Stockton*UTA	3,265	Alvin RobertsonSAS	301	2008–09
2009–10	Rajon RondoBOS	189	Jason Kidd*; NJN 2007–08; DAL 2008–12; NYK 2012–13	2,343	John Stockton*UTA	3,265	Alvin RobertsonSAS	301	2009–10
2010–11	Chris Paul^{†} NOH 2010–11; LAC 2011–12	188	Jason Kidd*; NJN 2007–08; DAL 2008–12; NYK 2012–13	2,477	John Stockton*UTA	3,265	Alvin RobertsonSAS	301	2010–11
2011–12	Chris Paul^{†} NOH 2010–11; LAC 2011–12	152	Jason Kidd*; NJN 2007–08; DAL 2008–12; NYK 2012–13	2,559	John Stockton*UTA	3,265	Alvin RobertsonSAS	301	2011–12
2012–13	Mike Conley^MEM	174	Jason Kidd*; NJN 2007–08; DAL 2008–12; NYK 2012–13	2,684	John Stockton*UTA	3,265	Alvin RobertsonSAS	301	2012–13
2013–14	Ricky RubioMIN	191	Kobe Bryant*LAL	1,835	John Stockton*UTA	3,265	Alvin RobertsonSAS	301	2013–14
2014–15	Stephen Curry^GSW	163	Kobe Bryant*LAL	1,882	John Stockton*UTA	3,265	Alvin RobertsonSAS	301	2014–15
2015–16	Stephen Curry^GSW	169	Kobe Bryant*LAL	1,944	John Stockton*UTA	3,265	Alvin RobertsonSAS	301	2015–16
2016–17	John WallWAS	157	Chris Paul^{†} LAC 2016–17; HOU 2017–19; OKC 2019–20; PHX 2020–23; GSW 2023–24; SAS 2024–25; LAC 2025–26	1,912	John Stockton*UTA	3,265	Alvin RobertsonSAS	301	2016–17
2017–18	Victor Oladipo^{§}IND	177	Chris Paul^{†} LAC 2016–17; HOU 2017–19; OKC 2019–20; PHX 2020–23; GSW 2023–24; SAS 2024–25; LAC 2025–26	2,008	John Stockton*UTA	3,265	Alvin RobertsonSAS	301	2017–18
2018–19	Paul George^OKC	170	Chris Paul^{†} LAC 2016–17; HOU 2017–19; OKC 2019–20; PHX 2020–23; GSW 2023–24; SAS 2024–25; LAC 2025–26	2,122	John Stockton*UTA	3,265	Alvin RobertsonSAS	301	2018–19
2019–20	James Harden^HOU	125	Chris Paul^{†} LAC 2016–17; HOU 2017–19; OKC 2019–20; PHX 2020–23; GSW 2023–24; SAS 2024–25; LAC 2025–26	2,233	John Stockton*UTA	3,265	Alvin RobertsonSAS	301	2019–20
2020–21	T. J. McConnell^IND	128	Chris Paul^{†} LAC 2016–17; HOU 2017–19; OKC 2019–20; PHX 2020–23; GSW 2023–24; SAS 2024–25; LAC 2025–26	2,332	John Stockton*UTA	3,265	Alvin RobertsonSAS	301	2020–21
2021–22	Dejounte Murray^SAS	138	Chris Paul^{†} LAC 2016–17; HOU 2017–19; OKC 2019–20; PHX 2020–23; GSW 2023–24; SAS 2024–25; LAC 2025–26	2,453	John Stockton*UTA	3,265	Alvin RobertsonSAS	301	2021–22
2022–23	OG Anunoby^TOR	128	Chris Paul^{†} LAC 2016–17; HOU 2017–19; OKC 2019–20; PHX 2020–23; GSW 2023–24; SAS 2024–25; LAC 2025–26	2,544	John Stockton*UTA	3,265	Alvin RobertsonSAS	301	2022–23
2023–24	De'Aaron Fox^SAC; Shai Gilgeous-Alexander^OKC	150	Chris Paul^{†} LAC 2016–17; HOU 2017–19; OKC 2019–20; PHX 2020–23; GSW 2023–24; SAS 2024–25; LAC 2025–26	2,614	John Stockton*UTA	3,265	Alvin RobertsonSAS	301	2023–24
2024–25	Dyson Daniels^ATL	229	Chris Paul^{†} LAC 2016–17; HOU 2017–19; OKC 2019–20; PHX 2020–23; GSW 2023–24; SAS 2024–25; LAC 2025–26	2,717	John Stockton*UTA	3,265	Alvin RobertsonSAS	301	2024–25
2025–26	Cason Wallace^OKC	150	Chris Paul^{†} LAC 2016–17; HOU 2017–19; OKC 2019–20; PHX 2020–23; GSW 2023–24; SAS 2024–25; LAC 2025–26	2,728	John Stockton*UTA	3,265	Alvin RobertsonSAS	301	2025–26
2026–27	Dyson Daniels^ATL	42	LeBron James^PHI	2,430	John Stockton*UTA	3,265	Alvin RobertsonSAS	301	2026–27
Season	Year-by-year leader	Steals	Active player leader	Steals	Career record	Steals	Single-season record	Steals	Season

== See also ==
- Basketball statistics
- NBA regular season records
