= List of NBA single-game steals leaders =

This is a complete listing of National Basketball Association players who have recorded nine or more steals in a game.

52 players have recorded nine or more steals in a game. It has occurred 72 times in NBA history.

Allen Iverson is the only player to record nine or more steals in a playoff game.

The NBA did not record steals until 1973–74 NBA season.

== Key ==
^	Active NBA player
*	Inducted into the Naismith Memorial Basketball Hall of Fame
†	Not yet eligible for Hall of Fame consideration (Note: A player is not eligible for induction into the Naismith Memorial Basketball Hall of Fame until he has been fully retired for three calendar years.)
	Occurred in playoff competition
	Player's team lost the game

== Single-game leaders ==
Steals	Player	Team	Score	Opponent	Date	Minutes played	Points	Rebounds	Assists	Notes
11	Larry Kenon	San Antonio Spurs	110–105	Kansas City Kings	December 26, 1976	44	29	15	4	(Note: Kenon finished with a triple-double.)
11	Kendall Gill	New Jersey Nets	88–77	Miami Heat	April 3, 1999	40	15	10	3	(Note: Gill had quarterly steals of 0, 5, 3 and 3. He had no steals in the first quarter. He finished with a triple-double. He led the league in steals that season.)
10	Jerry West*	Los Angeles Lakers	111–115	Seattle SuperSonics	December 7, 1973	37	27	5	5	(Note: West had 6 steals in the first half and 4 steals in the second half.)
10	Larry Steele	Portland Trail Blazers	112–99	Los Angeles Lakers	November 16, 1974	44	12	11	9	(Note: Steele barely missed a quadruple-double, by one assist. Regardless, he finished with a triple-double.)
10	Fred Brown*	Seattle SuperSonics	121–112	Philadelphia 76ers	December 3, 1976	40	29	3	7	(Note: Fred Brown had 8 steals in a half, tying the former NBA record.)
10	Gus Williams	Seattle SuperSonics	94–83	New Jersey Nets	February 22, 1978	42	31	4	4	
10	Eddie Jordan	New Jersey Nets	98–110	Philadelphia 76ers	March 23, 1979	39	13	1	1	(Note: This was the second game of a double header, which was only the second double header in NBA history.)
10	Johnny Moore	San Antonio Spurs	108–102	Indiana Pacers	March 6, 1985	35	16	7	8	
10	Fat Lever	Denver Nuggets	126–116	Indiana Pacers	March 9, 1985	31	13	4	15	(Note: Lever had 8 steals in the third quarter, setting the NBA record. He had 8 steals in the second half, tying the former NBA record. He finished the game with a triple-double.)
10	Clyde Drexler*	Portland Trail Blazers	89–95	Milwaukee Bucks	January 10, 1986	42	26	9	11	(Note: Drexler barely missed a quadruple-double, by one rebound. Regardless, he finished the game with a triple-double.)
10	Alvin Robertson	San Antonio Spurs	120–114	Phoenix Suns	February 18, 1986	36	20	11	10	(Note: Robertson achieved the second quadruple-double in NBA history. It is the only NBA quadruple-double with steals as one of the four statistics in double figures. He led the league in steals this season.)
10	Alvin Robertson (2)	San Antonio Spurs	109–102	Los Angeles Clippers	November 22, 1986	39	30	5	6	(Note: Robertson led the league in steals this season.)
10	Ron Harper	Cleveland Cavaliers	91–100	Philadelphia 76ers	March 10, 1987	44	28	5	7	(Note: Harper established the rookie single-game record. He had five steals in each half.)
10	Michael Jordan*	Chicago Bulls	120–93	New Jersey Nets	January 29, 1988	27	32	1	4	(Note: Jordan had 6 steals within the third quarter. He left the game early due to the Bulls' comfortable lead. He led the league in steals this season.)
10	Alvin Robertson (3)	San Antonio Spurs	117–122	Houston Rockets	January 11, 1989	44	20	5	7	(Note: The game went to overtime.)
10	Alvin Robertson (4)	Milwaukee Bucks	114–104	Utah Jazz	November 19, 1990	39	16	3	9	(Note: Robertson led the league in steals this season.)
10	Kevin Johnson	Phoenix Suns	114–95	Washington Bullets	December 9, 1993	38	17	3	13	(Note: Johnson recorded a triple-double this game.)
10	Clyde Drexler* (2)	Houston Rockets	96–85	Sacramento Kings	November 1, 1996	42	25	10	9	(Note: Drexler had 8 steals in the second half, tying the former NBA record. It was the first game of the season, marking the most steals in a season opener. For a second time in his career, Drexler barely missed a quadruple-double, this time by one assist. Regardless, he finished the game with a triple-double.)
10	Mookie Blaylock	Atlanta Hawks	95–94	Philadelphia 76ers	April 14, 1998	44	14	8	11	(Note: Blaylock finished the game with a triple-double. He led the league in steals this season.)
10	Allen Iverson*	Philadelphia 76ers	97–85	Orlando Magic	May 13, 1999	43	33	5	5	(Note: Iverson had quarterly steals of 3, 3, 3 and 1.)
10	Michael Finley*	Dallas Mavericks	98–114	Philadelphia 76ers	January 23, 2001	45	27	6	7	(Note: Finley had 8 steals in the first half, tying the former NBA record. He had 5 steals in the first quarter.)
10	Brandon Roy	Portland Trail Blazers	100–87	Washington Wizards	January 24, 2009	39:04	22	5	7	
10	Draymond Green^	Golden State Warriors	122–107	Memphis Grizzlies	February 10, 2017	38	4	12	10	(Note: Green became the first player in NBA history to record 10 steals and 5 blocks in one game. First triple-double in NBA history without scoring at least 10 points. He led the league in steals this season.)
10	Lou Williams	Los Angeles Clippers	113–125	Utah Jazz	January 20, 2018	40	31	2	7	(Note: Williams became the first player in NBA history to record 30 points, 10 steals, and 7 assists in a game since steals became a recorded stat.)
10	T. J. McConnell^	Indiana Pacers	114–111	Cleveland Cavaliers	March 3, 2021	36	16	4	13	(Note: McConnell had 9 steals in the first half, setting the NBA record. He finished the game with a triple-double.)
9	Calvin Murphy*	Houston Rockets	106–114	Boston Celtics	December 14, 1973	43	21	2	10	
9	Larry Steele (2)	Portland Trail Blazers	107–102	Los Angeles Lakers	March 5, 1974	40	15	5	10	(Note: Steele led the league in steals this season.)
9	Rick Barry*	Golden State Warriors	130–101	Buffalo Braves	October 29, 1974	43	30	10	11	(Note: Barry barely missed a quadruple-double, by one steal. Regardless, he finished the game with a triple-double. He led the league in steals this season.)
9	Don "Slick" Watts	Seattle SuperSonics	100–114	Philadelphia 76ers	February 23, 1975	43	13	6	14	(Note: Watts fouled out of the game.)
9	Larry Steele (3)	Portland Trail Blazers	120–98	Phoenix Suns	March 7, 1975	39	12	5	5	
9	Larry Steele (4)	Portland Trail Blazers	114–103	Detroit Pistons	March 14, 1976	40	22	7	8	
9	Quinn Buckner	Milwaukee Bucks	109–116	Indiana Pacers	January 2, 1977	33	16	7	7	(Note: Buckner was a rookie. The Bucks combined for 21 steals.)
9	Slick Watts (2)	Seattle SuperSonics	100–121	Phoenix Suns	March 27, 1977	36	14	3	8	
9	Earl Tatum	Detroit Pistons	105–103	Los Angeles Lakers	November 28, 1978	33	19	2	2	
9	Gus Williams (2)	Seattle SuperSonics	103–100	Washington Bullets	January 23, 1979	37	24	7	6	(Note: Williams had 8 steals in the second half, tying the former NBA record.)
9	Ron Lee	Detroit Pistons	99–102	Houston Rockets	March 16, 1980	42	20	5	6	(Note: Lee shot 6–12 from three-point range, tying the NBA record for three-point attempts at the time.)
9	Dudley Bradley	Indiana Pacers	106–108	Utah Jazz	November 10, 1980	39	14	2	6	(Note: Bradley had eight steals in the second half, tying the former NBA record. He had six steals in the fourth quarter.)
9	Dudley Bradley (2)	Indiana Pacers	117–101	Cleveland Cavaliers	November 29, 1980	28	11	0	2	(Note: Bradley had five steals in the fourth quarter.)
9	Micheal Ray Richardson	New York Knicks	114–117	Chicago Bulls	December 23, 1980	44	19	6	6	
9	Johnny High	Phoenix Suns	98–108	Washington Bullets	January 28, 1981	26	11	4	2	
9	Magic Johnson*	Los Angeles Lakers	99–101	Phoenix Suns	November 6, 1981	40	11	7	16	(Note: Johnson had five steals in a half and four steals in the other half. He led the league in steals this season.)
9	Jack Sikma*	Seattle SuperSonics	110–103	Kansas City Kings	January 27, 1982	40	20	9	3	
9	Rickey Green	Utah Jazz	125–119	Denver Nuggets	November 10, 1982	45	24	5	11	
9	Rickey Green (2)	Utah Jazz	113–126	Philadelphia 76ers	November 27, 1982	44	26	7	12	
9	Micheal Ray Richardson (2)	Golden State Warriors	106–102	San Antonio Spurs	February 5, 1983	42	10	5	11	(Note: Richardson led the league in steals this season.)
9	Darwin Cook	New Jersey Nets	122–128	Portland Trail Blazers	December 3, 1983	44	17	2	6	(Note: The game went to overtime. Cook fouled out.)
9	Gus Williams (3)	Washington Bullets	119–104	Atlanta Hawks	October 30, 1984	39	23	5	9	
9	Johnny Moore (2)	San Antonio Spurs	139–94	Golden State Warriors	January 8, 1985	36	26	11	13	(Note: Moore barely missed a quadruple-double, by one steal. Regardless, he finished the game with a triple-double.)
9	Larry Bird*	Boston Celtics	110–94	Utah Jazz	February 18, 1985	33	30	12	10	(Note: Bird did not play in the fourth quarter due to the Celtics' 22 point lead, as well as his own volition. He barely missed a quadruple-double, by one steal. Regardless, he finished the game with a triple-double.)
9	Micheal Ray Richardson (3)	New Jersey Nets	147–138	Indiana Pacers	October 30, 1985	54	38	11	11	(Note: Richardson registered a triple-double, and nearly reached a quadruple-double. The game went to triple overtime.)
9	Maurice Cheeks*	Philadelphia 76ers	108–102	Los Angeles Clippers	January 5, 1987	42	22	3	10	(Note: Cheeks had seven steals in a half.)
9	T. R. Dunn	Denver Nuggets	98–93	New Jersey Nets	January 6, 1988	32	2	5	3	(Note: Dunn did not start the game. Teammate Fat Lever had eight steals in the same game. It is the only time in NBA history that two teammates have both collected eight or more steals in the same game.)
9	Michael Jordan* (2)	Chicago Bulls	110–104	Boston Celtics	November 9, 1988	42	52	3	2	(Note: Jordan had 8 steals in the first half, tying the former NBA record.)
9	Hersey Hawkins*	Philadelphia 76ers	116–94	Boston Celtics	January 25, 1991	41	38	8	6	
9	John Stockton*	Utah Jazz	113–92	Houston Rockets	February 12, 1991	35	19	3	11	
9	Michael Adams*	Washington Bullets	109–103	Indiana Pacers	November 1, 1991	42	23	4	13	
9	Doc Rivers	Los Angeles Clippers	111–87	Phoenix Suns	November 6, 1991	18	5	1	5	(Note: Rivers had seven steals in a half.)
9	Michael Jordan* (3)	Chicago Bulls	118–105	New Jersey Nets	April 2, 1993	38	40	7	7	(Note: Jordan led the league in steals this season.)
9	Fat Lever (2)	Dallas Mavericks	87–77	Washington Bullets	February 10, 1994	34	4	7	3	
9	Scottie Pippen*	Chicago Bulls	116–95	Atlanta Hawks	March 8, 1994	42	39	6	10	
9	Eric Murdock	Milwaukee Bucks	96–104	Washington Bullets	April 2, 1994	37	18	5	7	
9	Mookie Blaylock (2)	Atlanta Hawks	98–127	Houston Rockets	February 17, 1997	34	18	0	5	(Note: Blaylock led the league in steals this season.)
9	Doug Christie	Toronto Raptors	124–122	Denver Nuggets	February 25, 1997	46	27	5	3	(Note: The game went to overtime.)
9	Eddie Jones	Charlotte Hornets	98–89	Indiana Pacers	November 4, 1999	36	22	3	3	(Note: Jones led the league in steals this season.)
9	Paul Pierce*	Boston Celtics	96–84	Miami Heat	December 3, 1999	38	26	5	4	(Note: Pierce had six steals in the first quarter and seven steals in the first half.)
9	Allen Iverson* (2)	Philadelphia 76ers	89–85	Orlando Magic	March 19, 2000	42	18	3	10	(Note: Iverson had seven steals in the second half.)
9	Andre Miller	Cleveland Cavaliers	91–94	Philadelphia 76ers	December 15, 2001	44	14	4	22	(Note: Miller had six steals in the second half.)
9	Allen Iverson* (3)	Philadelphia 76ers	107–104	Los Angeles Lakers	December 20, 2002	48	32	2	5	(Note: The game went to overtime. Iverson led the league in steals this season.)
9	Dirk Nowitzki*	Dallas Mavericks	98–101	Houston Rockets	March 7, 2004	45	18	1	1	
9	Rafer Alston	Houston Rockets	104–83	Charlotte Bobcats	February 10, 2007	41:13	14	1	8	(Note: Alston had eight steals in the second half, tying the former NBA record.)
9	Chris Paul†	New Orleans Hornets	104–93	Dallas Mavericks	February 20, 2008	40:38	31	5	11	(Note: Paul had seven steals in the first half. He led the league in steals this season.)
9	Mario Chalmers	Miami Heat	106–83	Philadelphia 76ers	November 5, 2008	30:32	6	4	6	(Note: Chalmers was a rookie.)
9	John Wall	Washington Wizards	116–115	Philadelphia 76ers	November 2, 2010	44:48	29	2	13	(Note: Wall was a rookie. He had seven steals in the second half. The game went to overtime.)
9	Michael Carter-Williams	Philadelphia 76ers	114–110	Miami Heat	October 30, 2013	36:10	22	7	12	(Note: The game was Carter-Williams' NBA debut, marking the most steals in an NBA debut.)

== See also ==
- NBA records
- List of NCAA Division I men's basketball players with 11 or more steals in a game
