= 1998–99 Washington Wizards season =

NBA professional basketball team season

- Head coach: Bernie Bickerstaff; Jim Brovelli
- Arena: MCI Center

Results
- Record: 18–32 (.360)
- Place: Division: 6th (Atlantic); Conference: 13th (Eastern)
- Playoff finish: Did not qualify
- Stats at Basketball Reference

Local media
- Television: WBDC; Home Team Sports
- Radio: WTEM

The 1998–99 Washington Wizards season was the 38th season for the Washington Wizards in the National Basketball Association, and their 26th season in Washington, D.C. Due to a lockout, the regular season began on February 5, 1999, and was cut from 82 games to 50.

== Season summary ==
=== Off-season ===
During the off-season, the Wizards acquired All-Star guard Mitch Richmond and Otis Thorpe from the Sacramento Kings, and signed free agents, second-year guard Jeff McInnis and undrafted rookie power forward Randell Jackson.

=== Regular season ===
With the addition of Richmond and Thorpe, the Wizards got off to a 4–4 start to the regular season, but soon struggled playing below .500 in winning percentage for the remainder of the season. Head coach Bernie Bickerstaff was fired after a 13–19 start, and was replaced with assistant coach Jim Brovelli as an interim coach, and Juwan Howard only played 36 games due to an ankle injury. The Wizards posted a seven-game losing streak in April, and lost nine of their final eleven games of the season, finishing in sixth place in the Atlantic Division with a disappointing 18–32 record.

Richmond averaged 19.7 points and 1.3 steals per game, and led the Wizards with 70 three-point field goals, while Howard averaged 18.9 points and 8.1 rebounds per game, and Rod Strickland provided the team with 15.7 points, 9.9 assists and 1.7 steals per game. In addition, Thorpe provided with 11.3 points and 6.8 rebounds per game, while Calbert Cheaney contributed 7.7 points per game, Tracy Murray contributed 6.5 points per game, Ben Wallace averaged 6.0 points, 8.3 rebounds and 2.0 blocks per game, and Terry Davis provided with 3.4 points and 3.8 rebounds per game.

The Wizards finished 20th in the NBA in home-game attendance, with an attendance of 402,481 at the MCI Center during the regular season.

=== Aftermath ===
Following the season, Thorpe signed as a free agent with the Miami Heat, while Cheaney signed with the Boston Celtics, Wallace, Davis, McInnis and Tim Legler were all traded to the Orlando Magic, who then released Davis, McInnis and Legler to free agency. Meanwhile, Jackson was released and Brovelli was fired as head coach.

== Draft picks ==
| Round | Pick | Player | Position | Nationality | College |
|---|---|---|---|---|---|
| 2 | 43 | Jahidi White | PF/C | United States | Georgetown |

== Roster ==
1998–99 Washington Wizards roster
Players

| Pos. | No. | Player | Height | Weight | DOB | From |
|---|---|---|---|---|---|---|
| F | 42 | Etdrick Bohannon | 6 ft 9 in (2.06 m) | 220 lb (100 kg) | –– | Auburn Montgomery |
| G/F | 40 | Calbert Cheaney | 6 ft 7 in (2.01 m) | 209 lb (95 kg) | –– | Indiana |
| C | 51 | John Coker | 7 ft 0 in (2.13 m) | 253 lb (115 kg) | –– | Boise State |
| C | 52 | Terry Davis (injured) | 6 ft 9 in (2.06 m) | 225 lb (102 kg) | –– | Virginia Union |
| F | 5 | Juwan Howard (injured) | 6 ft 9 in (2.06 m) | 240 lb (109 kg) | –– | Michigan |
| F | 50 | Randell Jackson | 6 ft 11 in (2.11 m) | 215 lb (98 kg) | –– | Florida State |
| G | 23 | Tim Legler | 6 ft 4 in (1.93 m) | 200 lb (91 kg) | –– | La Salle |
| G | 10 | Jeff McInnis | 6 ft 4 in (1.93 m) | 179 lb (81 kg) | –– | North Carolina |
| F | 35 | Tracy Murray | 6 ft 7 in (2.01 m) | 225 lb (102 kg) | –– | UCLA |
| G | 2 | Mitch Richmond | 6 ft 5 in (1.96 m) | 215 lb (98 kg) | –– | Kansas State |
| G | 1 | Rod Strickland | 6 ft 3 in (1.91 m) | 175 lb (79 kg) | –– | DePaul |
| F/C | 33 | Otis Thorpe | 6 ft 9 in (2.06 m) | 225 lb (102 kg) | –– | Providence |
| C | 30 | Ben Wallace | 6 ft 9 in (2.06 m) | 240 lb (109 kg) | –– | Virginia Union |
| F/C | 55 | Jahidi White | 6 ft 9 in (2.06 m) | 290 lb (132 kg) | –– | Georgetown |
| G | 12 | Chris Whitney | 6 ft 0 in (1.83 m) | 168 lb (76 kg) | –– | Clemson |
| F/C | 43 | Lorenzo Williams (injured) (IN) | 6 ft 9 in (2.06 m) | 200 lb (91 kg) | –– | Stetson |

Coaches
Head coach
- Jim Brovelli
Assistant(s)
- Mike Brown
- John Outlaw

Legend
- (DP) Unsigned draft pick
- (FA) Free agent
- (S) Suspended
- (IN) Inactive
- Injured

Roster

=== Roster Notes ===
- Center Lorenzo Williams was on the injured reserve list due to stress fractures in both feet, and missed the entire regular season.

== Regular season ==
=== Season standings ===
| Atlantic Division | W | L | PCT | GB | Home | Road | Div | GP |
|---|---|---|---|---|---|---|---|---|
| c-Miami Heat | 33 | 17 | .660 | – | 18‍–‍7 | 15‍–‍10 | 12–8 | 50 |
| x-Orlando Magic | 33 | 17 | .660 | – | 21‍–‍4 | 12‍–‍13 | 12–6 | 50 |
| x-Philadelphia 76ers | 28 | 22 | .560 | 5.0 | 17‍–‍8 | 11‍–‍14 | 9–10 | 50 |
| x-New York Knicks | 27 | 23 | .540 | 6.0 | 19‍–‍6 | 8‍–‍17 | 12–8 | 50 |
| Boston Celtics | 19 | 31 | .380 | 14.0 | 10‍–‍15 | 9‍–‍16 | 10–9 | 50 |
| Washington Wizards | 18 | 32 | .360 | 15.0 | 13‍–‍12 | 5‍–‍20 | 6–13 | 50 |
| New Jersey Nets | 16 | 34 | .320 | 17.0 | 12‍–‍13 | 4‍–‍21 | 6–13 | 50 |

Eastern Conference
| # | Team | W | L | PCT | GB | GP |
|---|---|---|---|---|---|---|
| 1 | c-Miami Heat * | 33 | 17 | .660 | – | 50 |
| 2 | y-Indiana Pacers * | 33 | 17 | .660 | – | 50 |
| 3 | x-Orlando Magic | 33 | 17 | .660 | – | 50 |
| 4 | x-Atlanta Hawks | 31 | 19 | .620 | 2.0 | 50 |
| 5 | x-Detroit Pistons | 29 | 21 | .580 | 4.0 | 50 |
| 6 | x-Philadelphia 76ers | 28 | 22 | .560 | 5.0 | 50 |
| 7 | x-Milwaukee Bucks | 28 | 22 | .560 | 5.0 | 50 |
| 8 | x-New York Knicks | 27 | 23 | .540 | 6.0 | 50 |
| 9 | Charlotte Hornets | 26 | 24 | .520 | 7.0 | 50 |
| 10 | Toronto Raptors | 23 | 27 | .460 | 10.0 | 50 |
| 11 | Cleveland Cavaliers | 22 | 28 | .440 | 11.0 | 50 |
| 12 | Boston Celtics | 19 | 31 | .380 | 14.0 | 50 |
| 13 | Washington Wizards | 18 | 32 | .360 | 15.0 | 50 |
| 14 | New Jersey Nets | 16 | 34 | .320 | 17.0 | 50 |
| 15 | Chicago Bulls | 13 | 37 | .260 | 20.0 | 50 |

z - clinched division title
y - clinched division title
x - clinched playoff spot

== Player statistics ==
Legend
| GP | Games played | GS | Games started | MPG | Minutes per game |
| FG% | Field-goal percentage | 3P% | 3-point field-goal percentage | FT% | Free-throw percentage |
| RPG | Rebounds per game | APG | Assists per game | SPG | Steals per game |
| BPG | Blocks per game | PPG | Points per game |

=== Regular season ===
| Player | GP | GS | MPG | FG% | 3P% | FT% | RPG | APG | SPG | BPG | PPG |
|---|---|---|---|---|---|---|---|---|---|---|---|
| Etdrick Bohannon | 2 | 0 | 2.0 | | | | .0 | .0 | .0 | .0 | .0 |
| Calbert Cheaney | 50 | 18 | 25.3 | .414 | .216 | .493 | 2.8 | 1.5 | .8 | .3 | 7.7 |
| John Coker | 14 | 0 | 7.0 | .419 | | .833 | 1.6 | .0 | .1 | .1 | 2.2 |
| Terry Davis | 37 | 34 | 15.6 | .533 | | .737 | 3.8 | .3 | .3 | .1 | 3.4 |
| Juwan Howard | 36 | 36 | 39.7 | .474 | .000 | .753 | 8.1 | 3.0 | 1.2 | .4 | 18.9 |
| Randell Jackson | 27 | 8 | 10.0 | .426 | .143 | .656 | 2.0 | .3 | .1 | .4 | 4.2 |
| Tim Legler | 30 | 0 | 12.6 | .443 | .400 | .500 | 1.3 | .7 | .1 | .1 | 4.0 |
| Jeff McInnis | 35 | 6 | 12.2 | .373 | .257 | .750 | .6 | 2.1 | .5 | .0 | 3.7 |
| Tracy Murray | 36 | 0 | 18.1 | .350 | .320 | .810 | 2.3 | .8 | .6 | .2 | 6.5 |
| Mitch Richmond | 50 | 50 | 38.2 | .412 | .317 | .857 | 3.4 | 2.4 | 1.3 | .2 | 19.7 |
| Rod Strickland | 44 | 43 | 37.1 | .416 | .286 | .746 | 4.8 | 9.9 | 1.7 | .1 | 15.7 |
| Otis Thorpe | 49 | 38 | 31.4 | .545 | .000 | .698 | 6.8 | 2.1 | .9 | .4 | 11.3 |
| Ben Wallace | 46 | 16 | 26.8 | .578 | | .356 | 8.3 | .4 | 1.1 | 2.0 | 6.0 |
| Jahidi White | 20 | 0 | 9.6 | .531 | | .429 | 2.9 | .1 | .2 | .6 | 2.5 |
| Chris Whitney | 39 | 1 | 11.3 | .410 | .337 | .871 | 1.2 | 1.8 | .5 | .1 | 4.8 |

Player statistics citation:

== See also ==
- 1998-99 NBA season
