= 1995–96 Dallas Mavericks season =

NBA professional basketball team season

- Head coach: Dick Motta
- General manager: Norm Sonju
- Owner: Don Carter
- Arena: Reunion Arena

Results
- Record: 26–56 (.317)
- Place: Division: 5th (Midwest); Conference: 12th (Western)
- Playoff finish: Did not qualify
- Stats at Basketball Reference

Local media
- Television: KDFI; Prime Sports Southwest
- Radio: WBAP

The 1995–96 Dallas Mavericks season was the 16th season for the Dallas Mavericks in the National Basketball Association.

== Season summary ==
=== Off-season ===
The Mavericks received the twelfth overall pick in the 1995 NBA draft, and selected center Cherokee Parks out of Duke University, and also selected center Loren Meyer out of Iowa State University with the 24th overall pick.

=== Regular season ===
The Mavericks got off to a fast start by winning their first four games of the regular season. However, after a 5–1 start to the season, the team struggled losing 21 of their next 24 games, as Jamal Mashburn suffered a season-ending knee injury after only playing just 18 games, averaging 23.4 points and 5.4 rebounds per game. Mashburn, second-year star Jason Kidd and Jim Jackson all had trouble getting along as teammates, as Mashburn and Jackson both feuded with each other, and Jackson and Kidd both feuded with each other; there were rumors that R&B singer Toni Braxton was involved in Kidd and Jackson's feud. The team's troubles continued as sixth man Roy Tarpley was banned from the NBA for violating the league's anti-drug policy. After holding a 16–30 record at the All-Star break, the Mavericks suffered an 11-game losing streak in March, and finished in fifth place in the Midwest Division with a 26–56 record, missing the NBA playoffs for the sixth consecutive year.

Kidd averaged 16.6 points, 6.8 rebounds, 9.7 assists and 2.2 steals per game, and also contributed 133 three-point field goals, while Jackson averaged 19.6 points and 5.0 rebounds per game, along with 121 three-point field goals. In addition, George McCloud showed improvement, stepping up in Mashburn's absence as the team's starting small forward, averaging 18.9 points, 4.8 rebounds and 1.4 steals per game, while finishing second in the league with 257 three-point field goals. Meanwhile, Popeye Jones provided the team with 11.3 points and 10.8 rebounds per game, while off the bench, second-year guard Tony Dumas contributed 11.6 points per game, Lucious Harris contributed 7.9 points per game, Meyer provided with 5.0 points and 4.4 rebounds per game, and starting defensive center Lorenzo Williams averaged 3.0 points, 8.0 rebounds and 1.9 blocks per game.

During the NBA All-Star weekend at the Alamodome in San Antonio, Texas, Kidd was selected for the 1996 NBA All-Star Game, as a member of the Western Conference All-Star team; it was his first ever All-Star appearance. Meanwhile, McCloud participated in the NBA Three-Point Shootout, and also finished in second place in Most Improved Player voting, behind Gheorghe Mureșan of the Washington Bullets. The Mavericks finished 15th in the NBA in home-game attendance, with an attendance of 684,138 at the Reunion Arena during the regular season.

=== Aftermath ===
In May, Ross Perot, Jr. purchased the team from founder Don Carter. Following the season, Jones was traded to the Toronto Raptors, while Harris signed as a free agent with the Philadelphia 76ers, and Williams signed with the Washington Bullets. Meanwhile, Parks was traded to the Minnesota Timberwolves, Scott Brooks signed with the New York Knicks, Terry Davis was released to free agency, and Dick Motta was fired as head coach, and re-assigned to serve as a consultant for the Mavericks.

== Offseason ==
=== Draft picks ===
Round	Pick	Player	Position	Nationality	College
1	12	Cherokee Parks	C/PF	United States	Duke
1	24	Loren Meyer	C/PF	United States	Iowa State

== Roster ==
1995–96 Dallas Mavericks roster
Players

Pos.	No.	Player	Height	Weight	DOB	From
G	1	Scott Brooks	5 ft 11 in (1.80 m)	165 lb (75 kg)	1965–07–31	UC Irvine
F	43	Terry Davis	6 ft 9 in (2.06 m)	225 lb (102 kg)	1967–06–17	Virginia Union
G	7	Tony Dumas	6 ft 6 in (1.98 m)	190 lb (86 kg)	1972–08–25	UMKC
G	30	Lucious Harris	6 ft 5 in (1.96 m)	190 lb (86 kg)	1970–12–18	Long Beach State
G	24	Jim Jackson	6 ft 6 in (1.98 m)	220 lb (100 kg)	1970–10–14	Ohio State
F	54	Popeye Jones	6 ft 8 in (2.03 m)	250 lb (113 kg)	1970–06–17	Murray State
G	5	Jason Kidd	6 ft 4 in (1.93 m)	205 lb (93 kg)	1973–03–23	California
F	32	Jamal Mashburn (injured)	6 ft 8 in (2.03 m)	240 lb (109 kg)	1972–11–29	Kentucky
F	21	George McCloud	6 ft 6 in (1.98 m)	205 lb (93 kg)	1967–05–27	Florida State
C	40	Loren Meyer	6 ft 10 in (2.08 m)	257 lb (117 kg)	1972–12–30	Iowa State
C	4	Cherokee Parks	6 ft 11 in (2.11 m)	235 lb (107 kg)	1972–10–11	Duke
F	50	Reggie Slater	6 ft 7 in (2.01 m)	215 lb (98 kg)	1970–08–27	Wyoming
C	44	Lorenzo Williams	6 ft 9 in (2.06 m)	200 lb (91 kg)	1969–07–15	Stetson
F	10	David Wood	6 ft 9 in (2.06 m)	227 lb (103 kg)	1964–11–30	Nevada

Coaches
Head coach
- Dick Motta
Assistant(s)
- Brad Davis
- Kip Motta

Legend
- (DP) Unsigned draft pick
- (FA) Free agent
- (S) Suspended
- Injured

Roster
Updated: February 23, 1996

== Regular season ==
=== Season standings ===
Midwest Division	W	L	PCT	GB	Home	Road	Div
y-San Antonio Spurs	59	23	.720	–	33–8	26–15	19–5
x-Utah Jazz	55	27	.671	4	34–7	21–20	14–10
x-Houston Rockets	48	34	.585	11	27–14	21–20	15–9
Denver Nuggets	35	47	.427	24	24–17	11–30	13–11
Minnesota Timberwolves	26	56	.317	33	17–24	9–32	10–14
Dallas Mavericks	26	56	.317	33	16–25	10–31	10–14
Vancouver Grizzlies	15	67	.183	44	10–31	5–36	3–21

Western Conference
#	Team	W	L	PCT	GB	GP
1	c-Seattle SuperSonics *	64	18	.780	–	82
2	y-San Antonio Spurs *	59	23	.720	5	82
3	x-Utah Jazz	55	27	.671	9	82
4	x-Los Angeles Lakers	53	29	.646	11	82
5	x-Houston Rockets	48	34	.585	16	82
6	x-Portland Trail Blazers	44	38	.537	20	82
7	x-Phoenix Suns	41	41	.500	23	82
8	x-Sacramento Kings	39	43	.476	25	82
9	Golden State Warriors	36	46	.439	28	82
10	Denver Nuggets	35	47	.427	29	82
11	Los Angeles Clippers	29	53	.354	35	82
12	Minnesota Timberwolves	26	56	.317	38	82
13	Dallas Mavericks	26	56	.317	38	82
14	Vancouver Grizzlies	15	67	.183	49	82

z - clinched division title
y - clinched division title
x - clinched playoff spot

=== Game log ===
1995–96 game log
Total: 26–56 (Home: 0–0; Road: 0–0)
November: 0–0 (home: 0–0; road: 0–0)

Game	Date	Team	Score	High points	High rebounds	High assists	Location Attendance	Record

December: 0–0 (home: 0–0; road: 0–0)

Game	Date	Team	Score	High points	High rebounds	High assists	Location Attendance	Record

January: 0–0 (home: 0–0; road: 0–0)

Game	Date	Team	Score	High points	High rebounds	High assists	Location Attendance	Record

February: 0–0 (home: 0–0; road: 0–0)

Game	Date	Team	Score	High points	High rebounds	High assists	Location Attendance	Record

March: 0–0 (home: 0–0; road: 0–0)

Game	Date	Team	Score	High points	High rebounds	High assists	Location Attendance	Record

April: 0–0 (home: 0–0; road: 0–0)

Game	Date	Team	Score	High points	High rebounds	High assists	Location Attendance	Record

1995–96 schedule

== Player statistics ==
=== Ragular season ===
Player	POS	GP	GS	MP	REB	AST	STL	BLK	PTS	MPG	RPG	APG	SPG	BPG	PPG
Jim Jackson	SG	82	82	2,820	410	235	47	22	1,604	34.4	5.0	2.9	.6	.3	19.6
Jason Kidd	PG	81	81	3,034	553	783	175	26	1,348	37.5	6.8	9.7	2.2	.3	16.6
George McCloud	SF	79	63	2,846	379	212	113	38	1,497	36.0	4.8	2.7	1.4	.5	18.9
Loren Meyer	C	72	21	1,266	319	57	20	32	363	17.6	4.4	.8	.3	.4	5.0
Scott Brooks	PG	69	0	716	41	100	42	3	352	10.4	.6	1.4	.6	.0	5.1
Popeye Jones	PF	68	68	2,322	737	132	54	27	770	34.1	10.8	1.9	.8	.4	11.3
Tony Dumas	SG	67	12	1,284	115	99	42	13	776	19.2	1.7	1.5	.6	.2	11.6
Lorenzo Williams	C	65	61	1,806	521	85	48	122	198	27.8	8.0	1.3	.7	1.9	3.0
Cherokee Parks	C	64	3	869	216	29	25	32	250	13.6	3.4	.5	.4	.5	3.9
Lucious Harris	SG	61	1	1,016	122	79	35	3	481	16.7	2.0	1.3	.6	.0	7.9
David Wood^{†}	PF	37	0	642	133	27	16	9	182	17.4	3.6	.7	.4	.2	4.9
Terry Davis	PF	28	0	501	117	21	10	4	137	17.9	4.2	.8	.4	.1	4.9
Jamal Mashburn	SF	18	18	669	97	50	14	3	422	37.2	5.4	2.8	.8	.2	23.4
Donald Hodge^{†}	C	13	0	113	22	4	1	8	18	8.7	1.7	.3	.1	.6	1.4
Reggie Slater^{†}	PF	3	0	26	5	0	0	0	11	8.7	1.7	.0	.0	.0	3.7

- ^{†} Denotes player spent time with another team in the season. Stats reflect time with the Mavericks only.

== Awards and records ==
- Jason Kidd, NBA All-Star Game

== Transactions ==
=== Free agents ===
Subtractions
Player	Date signed	New team
Doug Smith	Expansion Draft June 24, 1995	Toronto Raptors

== See also ==
- 1995-96 NBA season
