= 1999–2000 Washington Wizards season =

NBA professional basketball team season

- Head coach: Gar Heard (fired); Darrell Walker
- President: Michael Jordan
- General manager: Wes Unseld
- Owner: Abe Pollin
- Arena: MCI Center

Results
- Record: 29–53 (.354)
- Place: Division: 7th (Atlantic); Conference: 13th (Eastern)
- Playoff finish: Did not qualify
- Stats at Basketball Reference

Local media
- Television: Home Team Sports
- Radio: WTEM

The 1999–2000 Washington Wizards season was the 39th season for the Washington Wizards in the National Basketball Association, and their 27th season in Washington, D.C.

== Season summary ==
=== Off-season ===
The Wizards received the seventh overall pick in the 1999 NBA draft, and selected shooting guard Richard Hamilton from the University of Connecticut. During the off-season, the team acquired Isaac Austin from the Orlando Magic, signed free agents Aaron Williams, Michael Smith and second-year forward Gerard King, and hired Gar Heard as their new head coach. In January, retired All-Star guard, and former Chicago Bulls legend Michael Jordan joined the Wizards as the team's vice president.

=== Regular season ===
Under Heard and with the addition of Hamilton, Austin, Williams and Smith, the Wizards continued to struggle posting a seven-game losing streak in November, losing seven of their first eight games of the regular season, and later on holding a 15–34 record at the All-Star break. Heard was fired as head coach after a 14–30 start to the season, and was replaced with Darrell Walker, while the team signed free agent Don Reid, who was previously released by the Detroit Pistons. Despite posting a solid 10–7 record in March, the Wizards finished in last place in the Atlantic Division with a 29–53 record.

Mitch Richmond averaged 17.4 points and 1.5 steals per game, while Juwan Howard averaged 14.9 points and 5.7 rebounds per game, and Rod Strickland provided the team with 12.6 points, 7.5 assists and 1.4 steals per game. In addition, off the bench, sixth man Tracy Murray contributed 10.2 points per game and led the Wizards with 113 three-point field goals, while Hamilton contributed 9.0 points per game, and Chris Whitney provided with 7.8 points and 3.8 assists per game. On the defensive side, second-year center Jahidi White averaged 7.1 points and 6.9 rebounds per game, while Williams provided with 7.6 points and 5.0 rebounds per game off the bench, Smith contributed 6.3 points and 7.2 rebounds per game, but only played just 46 games due to an elbow injury, and King averaged 5.3 points and 4.0 rebounds per game.

During the NBA All-Star weekend at The Arena in Oakland in Oakland, California, Hamilton participated in the NBA 2Ball Competition, along with Chamique Holdsclaw of the WNBA's Washington Mystics. The Wizards finished 21st in the NBA in home-game attendance, with an attendance of 616,593 at the MCI Center during the regular season.

=== Aftermath ===
Following the season, Austin was traded to the Vancouver Grizzlies, while Murray was traded to the Denver Nuggets, Williams signed as a free agent with the New Jersey Nets, Reid signed with the Orlando Magic, and Walker was fired as head coach.

== Offseason ==
=== Draft picks ===
Round	Pick	Player	Position	Nationality	College
1	7	Richard Hamilton	SG	United States	Connecticut
2	35	Calvin Booth	C	United States	Penn State

== Roster ==
1999–2000 Washington Wizards roster
Players

Pos.	No.	Player	Height	Weight	DOB	From
C	8	Isaac Austin	6 ft 10 in (2.08 m)	255 lb (116 kg)	1969–08–18	Arizona State
C	52	Calvin Booth	6 ft 11 in (2.11 m)	230 lb (104 kg)	1976–05–07	Penn State
G	32	Richard Hamilton	6 ft 6 in (1.98 m)	185 lb (84 kg)	1978–02–14	Connecticut
F/C	5	Juwan Howard	6 ft 9 in (2.06 m)	240 lb (109 kg)	1973–02–07	Michigan
F	51	Gerard King	6 ft 9 in (2.06 m)	230 lb (104 kg)	1972–11–25	Nicholls State
F	35	Tracy Murray	6 ft 7 in (2.01 m)	225 lb (102 kg)	1971–07–25	UCLA
G/F	3	Laron Profit	6 ft 5 in (1.96 m)	204 lb (93 kg)	1977–08–05	Maryland
F/C	50	Don Reid	6 ft 8 in (2.03 m)	250 lb (113 kg)	1973–12–30	Georgetown
G	2	Mitch Richmond	6 ft 5 in (1.96 m)	215 lb (98 kg)	1965–06–30	Kansas State
F	34	Michael Smith (injured)	6 ft 8 in (2.03 m)	230 lb (104 kg)	1972–03–28	Providence
G	1	Rod Strickland (injured)	6 ft 3 in (1.91 m)	175 lb (79 kg)	1966–07–11	DePaul
C	55	Jahidi White	6 ft 9 in (2.06 m)	290 lb (132 kg)	1976–02–19	Georgetown
G	12	Chris Whitney	6 ft 0 in (1.83 m)	168 lb (76 kg)	1971–10–05	Clemson
F/C	44	Aaron Williams	6 ft 9 in (2.06 m)	220 lb (100 kg)	1971–10–02	Xavier
F	43	Lorenzo Williams (injured)	6 ft 9 in (2.06 m)	200 lb (91 kg)	1969–07–15	Stetson

Coaches
Head coach
- Gar Heard (fired)
- Darrell Walker
Assistant(s)
- Butch Beard
- Mike Bratz
- Tree Rollins

Legend
- (DP) Unsigned draft pick
- (FA) Free agent
- (S) Suspended
- Injured

Roster
Updated: March 13, 2000

== Regular season ==
=== Season standings ===
Atlantic Division	W	L	PCT	GB	Home	Road	Div
y-Miami Heat	52	30	.634	–	33–8	19–22	18–6
x-New York Knicks	50	32	.610	2	33–8	17–24	14–10
x-Philadelphia 76ers	49	33	.598	3	29–12	20–21	13–11
Orlando Magic	41	41	.500	11	26–15	15–26	12–13
Boston Celtics	35	47	.427	17	26–15	9–32	12–12
New Jersey Nets	31	51	.378	21	22–19	9–32	9–16
Washington Wizards	29	53	.354	23	17–24	12–29	7–17

#	Eastern Conference				
#	Team	W	L	PCT	GB
1	c-Indiana Pacers	56	26	.683	–
2	y-Miami Heat	52	30	.634	4
3	x-New York Knicks	50	32	.610	6
4	x-Charlotte Hornets	49	33	.598	7
5	x-Philadelphia 76ers	49	33	.598	7
6	x-Toronto Raptors	45	37	.549	11
7	x-Detroit Pistons	42	40	.512	14
8	x-Milwaukee Bucks	42	40	.512	14
9	Orlando Magic	41	41	.500	15
10	Boston Celtics	35	47	.427	21
11	Cleveland Cavaliers	32	50	.390	24
12	New Jersey Nets	31	51	.378	25
13	Washington Wizards	29	53	.354	27
14	Atlanta Hawks	28	54	.341	28
15	Chicago Bulls	17	65	.207	39

z - clinched division title
y - clinched division title
x - clinched playoff spot

== Player statistics ==
Legend
GP	Games played	GS	Games started	MPG	Minutes per game
FG%	Field-goal percentage	3P%	3-point field-goal percentage	FT%	Free-throw percentage
RPG	Rebounds per game	APG	Assists per game	SPG	Steals per game
BPG	Blocks per game	PPG	Points per game

=== Regular season ===
Player	POS	GP	GS	MP	REB	AST	STL	BLK	PTS	MPG	RPG	APG	SPG	BPG	PPG
Isaac Austin	C	59	23	1,173	282	74	17	38	397	19.9	4.8	1.3	.3	.6	6.7
Calvin Booth	C	11	0	143	32	7	3	14	42	13.0	2.9	.6	.3	1.3	3.8
Richard Hamilton	SG	71	12	1,373	129	108	28	6	639	19.3	1.8	1.5	.4	.1	9.0
Juwan Howard	PF	82	82	2,909	470	247	67	21	1,220	35.5	5.7	3.0	.8	.3	14.9
Reggie Jordan	PG	36	0	243	41	32	12	2	41	6.8	1.1	.9	.3	.1	1.1
Gerard King	SF	62	28	1,060	250	49	34	15	327	17.1	4.0	.8	.5	.2	5.3
Tracy Murray	SF	80	8	1,831	271	72	45	24	813	22.9	3.4	.9	.6	.3	10.2
Laron Profit	SG	33	1	225	26	25	7	4	49	6.8	.8	.8	.2	.1	1.5
Don Reid^{†}	PF	17	0	333	77	10	19	19	109	19.6	4.5	.6	1.1	1.1	6.4
Mitch Richmond	SG	74	69	2,397	213	185	110	13	1,285	32.4	2.9	2.5	1.5	.2	17.4
Michael Smith	SF	46	46	1,145	331	56	27	23	289	24.9	7.2	1.2	.6	.5	6.3
Rod Strickland	PG	69	67	2,188	259	519	94	18	869	31.7	3.8	7.5	1.4	.3	12.6
Jahidi White	C	80	59	1,537	553	15	31	83	569	19.2	6.9	.2	.4	1.0	7.1
Chris Whitney	PG	82	15	1,627	134	313	55	5	642	19.8	1.6	3.8	.7	.1	7.8
Aaron Williams	PF	81	0	1,545	409	58	41	92	616	19.1	5.0	.7	.5	1.1	7.6
Lorenzo Williams	PF	8	0	76	25	1	3	6	14	9.5	3.1	.1	.4	.8	1.8

- ^{†} Denotes player spent time with another team in the season. Stats reflect time with the Wizards only.

Player statistics citation:
