= 1997–98 Washington Wizards season =

NBA professional basketball team season

- Head coach: Bernie Bickerstaff
- Arena: US Airways Arena (5 games); MCI Center (36 games)

Results
- Record: 42–40 (.512)
- Place: Division: 4th (Atlantic); Conference: 9th (Eastern)
- Playoff finish: Did not qualify
- Stats at Basketball Reference

Local media
- Television: WBDC; Home Team Sports
- Radio: WTEM

The 1997–98 Washington Wizards season was the 37th season for the Washington Wizards in the National Basketball Association, and their 25th season in Washington, D.C. There was a new beginning for basketball in Washington, D.C. as the team changed its name to the "Wizards", fearing "Bullets" endorsed gun violence.

== Season summary ==
=== Off-season ===
The Wizards revealed their new primary logo, replacing their traditional red and blue colors with slated blue, bronze and black to their color scheme of white. The team's primary logo featured a bearded wizard in slated blue with a black letter "W" on its chest, and a bronze star on its slated blue hat, spinning a bronze basketball with its left hand, and pointing towards a bronze star with its right hand; the wizard is leaping in front of a bronze crescent moon with black basketball seams, and above the team name "Wizards" in slated blue letters.

The team also revealed new white home uniforms with slated blue side panels on the left side of their jerseys and shorts, and new slated blue road uniforms with black side panels; both uniforms featured a slated blue, bronze and black trim, with bronze and black outlines next to the side panels, and also featured the team's primary logo on the right leg of their shorts. The team's new primary logo, and new uniforms would both remain in use until 2007, where they switched to a lighter shade of bronze in their logo.

During the off-season, the team signed free agent Terry Davis to join their frontcourt, as the team's starting center, Gheorghe Mureșan missed the entire regular season due to a stretched right ankle tendon, and a right foot injury; the team also re-signed former Bullets guard Ledell Eackles for the third time after a one-year absence from the NBA.

=== Regular season ===
In their NBA regular season debut as the "Wizards", the team lost to the Detroit Pistons on the road, 92–79 at The Palace of Auburn Hills on October 31, 1997. The Wizards got off to a slow 5–11 start to the season, which included a six-game losing streak in November. The team lost their first five home games at US Airways Arena, only winning games on the road such as defeating the Utah Jazz, 90–86 at the Delta Center on November 3, and the 2-time defending NBA champion Chicago Bulls, 90–83 at the United Center on November 12. The Wizards played their final home game at US Airways Arena on November 29, losing to the Bulls by a score of 88–83; the team then moved from their old arena that was known as the "Capital Centre", into their new arena known as the MCI Center in December.

In their first game at the MCI Center, the Wizards won their first home game of the season, defeating the Seattle SuperSonics by a score of 95–78 on December 2. The team posted a six-game winning streak in December, and later on held a 25–24 record at the All-Star break. The Wizards won their final four games of the season, and finished in fourth place in the Atlantic Division with a 42–40 record, but failed to qualify for the NBA playoffs, finishing just one game behind the 8th–seeded New Jersey Nets.

Chris Webber averaged 21.9 points, 9.5 rebounds, 3.8 assists, 1.6 steals and 1.7 blocks per game, while Juwan Howard averaged 18.5 points and 7.0 rebounds per game, and Rod Strickland provided the team with 17.8 points, 5.3 rebounds, 10.5 assists and 1.7 steals per game, and was named to the All-NBA Second Team. In addition, sixth man Tracy Murray provided scoring off the bench, averaging 15.1 points per game and leading the Wizards with 158 three-point field goals, while Calbert Cheaney provided with 12.8 points per game, and Eackles contributed 5.2 points per game, but only played just 42 games. Meanwhile, Chris Whitney contributed 5.1 points and 2.4 assists per game, but only shot .355 in field-goal percentage, Davis averaged 4.4 points and 6.5 rebounds per game, and second-year forward Ben Wallace provided with 3.1 points, 4.8 rebounds and 1.1 blocks per game.

During the NBA All-Star weekend at Madison Square Garden in New York City, New York, Murray participated in the NBA Three-Point Shootout. Despite stellar seasons, neither Webber or Strickland were selected for the 1998 NBA All-Star Game. Strickland finished tied in 18th place in Most Valuable Player voting, and also finished tied in 13th place in Most Improved Player voting, while Murray finished tied in sixth place in Sixth Man of the Year voting.

The Wizards finished sixth in the NBA in home-game attendance, with an attendance of 801,240 at the MCI Center during the regular season.

=== Aftermath ===
Following the season, Webber was traded to the Sacramento Kings after four seasons in Washington, while Harvey Grant signed as a free agent with the Philadelphia 76ers, and Mureșan and Eackles were both released to free agency.

== Offseason ==
=== Draft picks ===
Round	Pick	Player	Position	Nationality	College
2	45	God Shammgod	PG	United States	Providence College
2	48	Predrag Drobnjak	C	Montenegro	

The Wizards entered the draft with two second-round selections, including the 48th pick acquired from the Charlotte Hornets in 1994. The team forfeited their first-round draft pick in connection with the signing of Juwan Howard in 1996; Washington would have had the 17th overall pick.

== Roster ==
1997–98 Washington Wizards roster
Players

Pos.	No.	Player	Height	Weight	DOB	From
G	40	Calbert Cheaney	6 ft 7 in (2.01 m)	209 lb (95 kg)	1971–07–17	Indiana
F	52	Terry Davis	6 ft 9 in (2.06 m)	225 lb (102 kg)	1967–06–17	Virginia Union
G	21	Ledell Eackles	6 ft 5 in (1.96 m)	220 lb (100 kg)	1966–11–24	LSU New Orleans
F	44	Harvey Grant	6 ft 8 in (2.03 m)	195 lb (88 kg)	1965–07–04	Oklahoma
F	31	Darvin Ham	6 ft 7 in (2.01 m)	220 lb (100 kg)	1973–07–23	Texas Tech
F	5	Juwan Howard	6 ft 9 in (2.06 m)	240 lb (109 kg)	1973–02–07	Michigan
G	23	Tim Legler (injured)	6 ft 4 in (1.93 m)	200 lb (91 kg)	1966–12–26	La Salle
C	77	Gheorghe Mureșan (injured) (IN)	7 ft 7 in (2.31 m)	303 lb (137 kg)	1971–02–14	Romania
F	35	Tracy Murray	6 ft 7 in (2.01 m)	225 lb (102 kg)	1971–07–25	UCLA
G	2	God Shammgod	6 ft 0 in (1.83 m)	169 lb (77 kg)	1976–04–29	Providence
G	1	Rod Strickland (injured)	6 ft 3 in (1.91 m)	175 lb (79 kg)	1966–07–11	DePaul
F/C	30	Ben Wallace	6 ft 9 in (2.06 m)	240 lb (109 kg)	1974–09–10	Virginia Union
C	4	Chris Webber	6 ft 9 in (2.06 m)	245 lb (111 kg)	1973–03–01	Michigan
G	12	Chris Whitney	6 ft 0 in (1.83 m)	168 lb (76 kg)	1971–10–05	Clemson
F	43	Lorenzo Williams (injured)	6 ft 9 in (2.06 m)	200 lb (91 kg)	1969–07–15	Stetson

Coaches
Head coach
- Bernie Bickerstaff
Assistant(s)
- Jim Brovelli
- Mike Brown

Legend
- (DP) Unsigned draft pick
- (FA) Free agent
- (S) Suspended
- (IN) Inactive
- Injured

Roster

=== Roster Notes ===
- Center Gheorghe Mureșan was on the injured reserve list due to a stretched right ankle tendon and foot injury, and missed the entire regular season.

== Regular season ==
=== Season standings ===
Atlantic Division	W	L	PCT	GB	Home	Road	Div
y-Miami Heat	55	27	.671	–	30-11	25–16	18–6
x-New York Knicks	43	39	.524	12	28–13	15–26	13–11
x-New Jersey Nets	43	39	.524	12	26–15	17–24	12–12
Washington Wizards	42	40	.512	13	24–17	18–23	12–13
Orlando Magic	41	41	.500	14	24–17	17–24	11–13
Boston Celtics	36	46	.439	19	24–17	12–29	12–12
Philadelphia 76ers	31	51	.378	24	19–22	12–29	7–17

#	Eastern Conference				
#	Team	W	L	PCT	GB
1	c-Chicago Bulls	62	20	.756	–
2	y-Miami Heat	55	27	.671	7
3	x-Indiana Pacers	58	24	.707	4
4	x-Charlotte Hornets	51	31	.622	11
5	x-Atlanta Hawks	50	32	.610	12
6	x-Cleveland Cavaliers	47	35	.573	15
7	x-New York Knicks	43	39	.524	19
8	x-New Jersey Nets	43	39	.524	19
9	Washington Wizards	42	40	.512	20
10	Orlando Magic	41	41	.500	21
11	Detroit Pistons	37	45	.451	25
12	Boston Celtics	36	46	.439	26
13	Milwaukee Bucks	36	46	.439	26
14	Philadelphia 76ers	31	51	.378	31
15	Toronto Raptors	16	66	.195	46

z – clinched division title
y – clinched division title
x – clinched playoff spot

== Player statistics ==
Legend
GP	Games played	GS	Games started	MPG	Minutes per game
FG%	Field-goal percentage	3P%	3-point field-goal percentage	FT%	Free-throw percentage
RPG	Rebounds per game	APG	Assists per game	SPG	Steals per game
BPG	Blocks per game	PPG	Points per game

=== Regular season ===
Player	GP	GS	MPG	FG%	3P%	FT%	RPG	APG	SPG	BPG	PPG
Calbert Cheaney	82	82	34.6	.457	.283	.647	4.0	2.1	1.2	.4	12.8
Terry Davis	74	66	23.0	.496	.000	.580	6.5	.4	.6	.3	4.4
Ledell Eackles	42	0	13.0	.429	.348	.881	1.8	.4	.4	.0	5.2
Harvey Grant	65	8	13.8	.383	.167	.633	2.6	.6	.4	.2	2.6
Darvin Ham	71	3	8.9	.529		.473	1.8	.2	.3	.4	2.0
Juwan Howard	64	64	40.0	.467	.000	.721	7.0	3.3	1.3	.4	18.5
Tim Legler	8	0	9.5	.158	.000	.750	.5	.4	.1	.0	1.1
Lawrence Moten	8	0	3.4	.231	.000	.750	.1	.4	.0	.0	1.1
Tracy Murray	82	12	27.2	.446	.392	.871	3.4	1.0	.8	.3	15.1
Jimmy Oliver	1	0	10.0	.500	.500		2.0	1.0	.0	.0	5.0
God Shammgod	20	0	7.3	.328	.000	.767	.4	1.8	.4	.1	3.1
Rod Strickland	76	76	39.7	.434	.250	.726	5.3	10.5	1.7	.3	17.8
Ben Wallace	67	16	16.8	.518		.357	4.8	.3	.9	1.1	3.1
Chris Webber	71	71	39.6	.482	.317	.589	9.5	3.8	1.6	1.7	21.9
Chris Whitney	82	6	13.1	.355	.308	.915	1.4	2.4	.4	.1	5.1
Lorenzo Williams	14	6	7.9	.765		.000	1.9	.2	.1	.2	1.9

Player statistics citation:

== Awards and records ==
- Rod Strickland, All-NBA Second Team

== See also ==
- 1997–98 NBA season
