= Harvey Grant =

American basketball player (born 1965)

Personal information
- Born: July 4, 1965 (age 61) Augusta, Georgia, U.S.
- Listed height: 6 ft 9 in (2.06 m)
- Listed weight: 225 lb (102 kg)

Career information
- High school: Hancock Central (Sparta, Georgia)
- College: Clemson (1984–1985); Independence CC (1985–1986); Oklahoma (1986–1988)
- NBA draft: 1988: 1st round, 12th overall pick
- Drafted by: Washington Bullets
- Playing career: 1988–2000
- Position: Power forward / small forward
- Number: 44

Career history
- 1988–1993: Washington Bullets
- 1993–1996: Portland Trail Blazers
- 1996–1998: Washington Bullets / Wizards
- 1999: Philadelphia 76ers

Career highlights
- Third-team All-American – NABC, UPI (1988); First-team All-Big Eight (1988); Big Eight Rookie of the Year (1987); Big Eight All-Rookie Team (1987)

Career NBA statistics
- Points: 7,781 (9.9 ppg)
- Rebounds: 3,436 (4.4 rpg)
- Assists: 1,219 (1.6 apg)
- Stats at NBA.com
- Stats at Basketball Reference

Harvey Grant (born July 4, 1965) is an American former professional National Basketball Association (NBA) basketball player. He is the identical twin brother of Horace Grant, also a former NBA player.

== College career ==
Grant transferred to Oklahoma after a year at Independence Community College and a year at Clemson with his brother Horace. He was a member of the 1988 Sooner team that went to the National Championship and lost to Kansas.

== Professional career ==
=== Washington Bullets (1988–1993) ===
Selected twelfth overall by the Washington Bullets in the 1988 NBA draft out of Oklahoma, Grant averaged 5.6 points, 2.3 rebounds and 1.1 assists per game. He lifted his averages to 8.2 points, 4.2 rebounds and 1.6 assists the following season, in 1989–90. Grant improved markedly in the 1990–91 campaign, when he averaged 18.2 points, 7.2 rebounds, 2.6 assists and 1.18 steals per game. At season's end, he was runner-up to the 1991 NBA Most Improved Player Award (which was earned by Orlando's Scott Skiles). In two subsequent seasons, he continued his solid play with 18.0 and 18.6 points per contest in 1991–92 and 1992–93, respectively.

=== Portland Trail Blazers (1993–1996) ===
In 1993, Grant was traded to the Portland Trail Blazers in exchange for center Kevin Duckworth, where he was instead utilized in a secondary role off the bench, and in three seasons with Portland, averaged 9.6 points per game.

=== Return to Washington (1996–1998) ===
On July 15, 1996, Grant returned to the Washington Bullets via a trade, along with Blazers point guard Rod Strickland, for power forward Rasheed Wallace and shooting guard Mitchell Butler. By this stage Grant's career was on a downslide, averaging 4.1 points in 1996–97, then slipping to 2.6 points the following season when the Bullets franchise had reinvented itself as the Wizards.

=== Philadelphia 76ers (1999) ===
Grant rounded out his professional career with the Philadelphia 76ers in the lockout-shortened 1999 NBA season, averaging 3.1 points and 2.3 rebounds in 47 of 50 possible games.

Grant was traded just before the 1999–00 season along with Anthony Parker to the Orlando Magic for Billy Owens, who had previously been sent to the Magic in a trade that sent brother Horace to the Seattle SuperSonics. On October 5, 2000, he re-signed with the Wizards and appeared in six exhibition games before he was waived on October 31.

== Career statistics ==
Legend
GP	Games played	GS	Games started	MPG	Minutes per game
FG%	Field goal percentage	3P%	3-point field goal percentage	FT%	Free throw percentage
RPG	Rebounds per game	APG	Assists per game	SPG	Steals per game
BPG	Blocks per game	PPG	Points per game	**Bold**	Career high

=== Regular season ===
Year	Team	GP	GS	MPG	FG%	3P%	FT%	RPG	APG	SPG	BPG	PPG
1988–89	Washington	71	1	16.8	.464	.000	.596	2.3	1.1	.5	.4	5.6
1989–90	Washington	**81**	25	22.8	.473	.000	.701	4.2	1.6	.6	.5	8.2
1990–91	Washington	77	**76**	36.9	**.498**	.133	.743	**7.2**	2.6	**1.2**	**.8**	18.2
1991–92	Washington	64	60	**37.3**	.478	.125	**.800**	6.8	2.7	**1.2**	.4	18.0
1992–93	Washington	72	72	37.0	.478	.133	.745	5.7	**2.8**	1.0	.6	**18.6**
1993–94	Portland	77	73	27.4	.460	.286	.641	4.6	1.4	.9	.6	10.4
1994–95	Portland	75	14	23.6	.461	.308	.705	3.8	1.1	.7	.7	9.1
1995–96	Portland	76	75	31.5	.462	.313	.545	4.8	1.5	.8	.6	9.3
1996–97	Washington	78	25	20.6	.411	**.315**	.769	3.3	.9	.6	.6	4.1
1997–98	Washington	65	8	13.8	.383	.167	.633	2.6	.6	.4	.2	2.6
1998–99	Philadelphia	47	10	17.0	.369	.167	.724	2.3	.5	.4	.3	3.1
Career		783	439	26.2	.469	.267	.709	4.4	1.6	.8	.5	9.9

=== Playoffs ===
Year	Team	GP	GS	MPG	FG%	3P%	FT%	RPG	APG	SPG	BPG	PPG
1994	Portland	4	1	19.0	.515	—	—	2.3	.8	.3	.5	8.5
1995	Portland	3	3	**38.3**	.500	**.556**	**.625**	**5.3**	**2.0**	**1.0**	**.7**	**14.3**
1996	Portland	**5**	**5**	32.8	.342	.143	.000	4.0	.8	.0	.4	5.4
1997	Washington	3	0	9.7	.000	.000	—	1.3	.0	.0	**.7**	.0
1999	Philadelphia	4	0	7.3	**1.000**	—	—	1.0	.0	.0	.3	.5
Career		19	9	21.7	.437	.353	.500	2.8	.7	.2	.5	5.6

== Personal life ==
Grant's son Jerai, who played college basketball for Clemson University, the same school that Harvey attended before transferring to Oklahoma, has since played in professional leagues in Australia, Italy, Israel, Latvia and currently Lithuania. Another son, Jerian, played for the University of Notre Dame and was selected by the New York Knicks in the 1st round of the 2015 NBA Draft, and a younger son, Jerami, played for the Syracuse University before being drafted 39th overall by the Philadelphia 76ers in the 2014 NBA draft. Jerami was traded to the Oklahoma City Thunder on November 1, 2016, and played three seasons in Oklahoma City before being traded to the Denver Nuggets on July 8, 2019. Jaelin Grant is his youngest son. Harvey Grant also has a daughter, Mikayla, born in 2005 with ex-girlfriend Karen Mitchell. Harvey currently resides in Annapolis, MD and is married to Tonya Dean Steiner Grant.

Grant is also a grandfather to Jerai's daughter, Halle.
