= 1996–97 Washington Bullets season =

NBA professional basketball team season

- Head coach: Jim Lynam (fired) (22–24); Bob Staak (interim) (0–1); Bernie Bickerstaff (22–13)
- General manager: Wes Unseld
- Owner: Abe Pollin
- Arena: US Airways Arena (37 games); Baltimore Arena (4 games)

Results
- Record: 44–38 (.537)
- Place: Division: 4th (Atlantic); Conference: 8th (Eastern)
- Playoff finish: First round (lost to Bulls 0–3)
- Stats at Basketball Reference

Local media
- Television: WBDC; Home Team Sports
- Radio: WTOP

The 1996–97 Washington Bullets season was the 36th season for the Washington Bullets in the National Basketball Association, and their 24th season in Washington, D.C..

== Season summary ==
=== Off-season ===
During the off-season, the Bullets acquired Rod Strickland, and former Bullets forward Harvey Grant from the Portland Trail Blazers, and signed free agents Tracy Murray, Jaren Jackson and Lorenzo Williams. Despite a stellar season last year, Juwan Howard signed a 7-year $100 million contract with the Miami Heat. However, the deal was voided claiming that the Heat exceeded their salary cap; the Bullets quickly re-signed Howard, but would lose their first-round draft pick next year.

=== Regular season ===
With the addition of Strickland, Murray and Grant, the Bullets got off to a 7–6 start to the regular season, but then posted a five-game losing streak afterwards. The team played around .500 in winning percentage for the first half of the season, holding a 22–25 record at the All-Star break. After 46 games, the Bullets fired head coach Jim Lynam, then after playing one game under assistant coach Bob Staak, the team hired former Bullets assistant Bernie Bickerstaff as their new coach. Under Bickerstaff, the Bullets finished the season strong by winning 19 of their final 26 games, including a six-game winning streak between March and April. On the final day of the regular season on April 20, 1997, the Bullets defeated the Cleveland Cavaliers on the road, 85–81 at the Gund Arena to capture the eighth seed in the Eastern Conference; the team finished in fourth place in the Atlantic Division with a 44–38 record, qualifying for the NBA playoffs for the first time since the 1987–88 season, and ending an eight-year playoff drought.

Chris Webber averaged 20.1 points, 10.3 rebounds, 4.6 assists, 1.7 steals and 1.9 blocks per game, while Howard averaged 19.1 points, 8.0 rebounds and 3.8 assists per game, and Strickland provided the team with 17.2 points, 8.9 assists and 1.7 steals per game. In addition, Calbert Cheaney contributed 10.6 points per game, while last season's Most Improved Player Gheorghe Mureșan averaged 10.6 points, 6.6 rebounds and 1.3 blocks per game. Off the bench, Murray contributed 10.0 points per game and led the Bullets with 106 three-point field goals, while Chris Whitney provided with 5.2 points and 2.2 assists per game, Jackson contributed 5.0 points per game, and Grant averaged 4.1 points and 3.3 rebounds per game.

During the NBA All-Star weekend at the Gund Arena in Cleveland, Ohio, Webber was selected for the 1997 NBA All-Star Game, as a member of the Eastern Conference All-Star team; it was his first ever All-Star appearance. Meanwhile, Tim Legler participated in the NBA Three-Point Shootout for the second consecutive year; Legler won the competition the previous year. The Bullets finished twelfth in the NBA in home-game attendance, with an attendance of 700,646 at US Airways Arena during the regular season.

=== NBA playoffs ===
In the Eastern Conference First Round of the 1997 NBA playoffs, the Bullets faced off against the top–seeded, and defending NBA champion Chicago Bulls, who won the Central Division title, and were led by the trio of All-Star guard Michael Jordan, All-Star forward Scottie Pippen, and rebound-specialist Dennis Rodman. The Bullets lost the first two games to the Bulls on the road at the United Center, which included a 109–104 loss in Game 2, in which Jordan scored 55 points. In Game 3 at US Airways Arena, and despite taking a 14–2 lead early in the first quarter, the Bullets lost to the Bulls by a score of 96–95, thus losing the series in a three-game sweep.

This would be the team's final NBA playoff appearance until the 2004–05 season, as what would follow was a seven-year playoff drought. The Bulls would go on to defeat the Utah Jazz in six games in the 1997 NBA Finals, winning their second consecutive NBA championship, and their fifth championship in seven years.

=== Aftermath ===
This was also the Bullet's final full season in which they played their home games at the arena that was known as the "Capital Centre" in Landover, Maryland. In addition, this was also their final season in which they played occasional home games at the Baltimore Arena in Baltimore, Maryland; in their final game at the Baltimore Arena, the Bullets defeated the Dallas Mavericks by a score of 94–87 on March 29, 1997. Following the season, Jackson signed as a free agent with the San Antonio Spurs.

Game 3 of the first-round series against the Bulls at US Airways Arena was officially the team's final game as the "Bullets". In 1995, Bullets owner Abe Pollin decided to change the team's name due to gun violence in Washington, D.C., and after the assassination of his friend, Israel Prime Minister Yitzhak Rabin. On May 15, 1997, the team officially changed its name to the "Wizards", and became known as the "Washington Wizards" the following season. The rebrand was held up by a copyright lawsuit filed by the Harlem Wizards, a traveling comedy basketball team with the same name. Still, the Bullets won the trademark infringement case, as a court ruling allowed them to change their name to the "Wizards".

== Draft picks ==
Round	Pick	Player	Position	Nationality	College
2	55	Ronnie Henderson		United States	LSU

== Roster ==
1996–97 Washington Bullets roster
Players

Pos.	No.	Player	Height	Weight	DOB	From
F	50	Ashraf Amaya	6 ft 8 in (2.03 m)	230 lb (104 kg)	1971–11–23	Southern Illinois
G	40	Calbert Cheaney	6 ft 7 in (2.01 m)	209 lb (95 kg)	1971–07–17	Indiana
C	22	Matt Fish	6 ft 11 in (2.11 m)	235 lb (107 kg)	1969–11–18	UNC Wilmington
F	44	Harvey Grant	6 ft 8 in (2.03 m)	195 lb (88 kg)	1965–07–04	Oklahoma
F	5	Juwan Howard	6 ft 9 in (2.06 m)	240 lb (109 kg)	1973–02–07	Michigan
G	32	Jaren Jackson	6 ft 4 in (1.93 m)	190 lb (86 kg)	1967–10–27	Georgetown
G	23	Tim Legler	6 ft 4 in (1.93 m)	200 lb (91 kg)	1966–12–26	La Salle
C	77	Gheorghe Mureșan	7 ft 7 in (2.31 m)	303 lb (137 kg)	1971–02–14	Romania
F	35	Tracy Murray	6 ft 7 in (2.01 m)	225 lb (102 kg)	1971–07–25	UCLA
G	1	Rod Strickland	6 ft 3 in (1.91 m)	175 lb (79 kg)	1966–07–11	DePaul
F	30	Ben Wallace	6 ft 9 in (2.06 m)	240 lb (109 kg)	1974–09–10	Virginia Union
F	4	Chris Webber	6 ft 9 in (2.06 m)	245 lb (111 kg)	1973–03–01	Michigan
G	12	Chris Whitney	6 ft 0 in (1.83 m)	168 lb (76 kg)	1971–10–05	Clemson
C	43	Lorenzo Williams	6 ft 9 in (2.06 m)	200 lb (91 kg)	1969–07–15	Stetson

Coaches
Head coach
- Jim Lynam (fired)
- Bob Staak (interim)
- Bernie Bickerstaff
Assistant(s)
- Buzz Braman

Legend
- (DP) Unsigned draft pick
- (FA) Free agent
- (S) Suspended
- Injured

Roster
Updated: April 16, 1997

== Regular season ==
=== Season standings ===
Atlantic Division	W	L	PCT	GB	Home	Road	Div
y-Miami Heat	61	21	.744	–	29–12	32–9	16–8
x-New York Knicks	57	25	.695	4	31–10	26–15	19–6
x-Orlando Magic	45	37	.549	16	26–15	19–22	13–11
x-Washington Bullets	44	38	.537	17	25–16	19–22	14–10
New Jersey Nets	26	56	.317	35	16–25	10–31	11–13
Philadelphia 76ers	22	60	.268	39	11–30	11–30	11–14
Boston Celtics	15	67	.183	46	11–30	4–37	1–23

1996–97 NBA East standings
#	Eastern Conference				
#	Team	W	L	PCT	GB
1	z-Chicago Bulls	69	13	.841	–
2	y-Miami Heat	61	21	.744	8
3	x-New York Knicks	57	25	.695	12
4	x-Atlanta Hawks	56	26	.683	13
5	x-Detroit Pistons	54	28	.659	15
6	x-Charlotte Hornets	54	28	.659	15
7	x-Orlando Magic	45	37	.549	24
8	x-Washington Bullets	44	38	.537	25
9	Cleveland Cavaliers	42	40	.512	27
10	Indiana Pacers	39	43	.476	30
11	Milwaukee Bucks	33	49	.402	36
12	Toronto Raptors	30	52	.366	39
13	New Jersey Nets	26	56	.317	43
14	Philadelphia 76ers	22	60	.268	47
15	Boston Celtics	15	67	.183	54

z – clinched division title
y – clinched division title
x – clinched playoff spot

== Game log ==
=== Regular season ===
1996–97 game log
Total: 44–38 (home: 25–16; road: 19–22)
November: 7–8 (home: 4–5; road: 3–3)

Game	Date	Team	Score	High points	High rebounds	High assists	Location Attendance	Record
1	November 1, 1996	@ Orlando	W 96–92				Orlando Arena	1–0
2	November 2, 1996	Cleveland	L 96–98 (OT)				US Airways Arena	1–1
3	November 6, 1996	San Antonio	W 96–86				US Airways Arena	2–1
4	November 8, 1996	Charlotte	L 87–102				US Airways Arena	2–2
5	November 9, 1996	@ Indiana	L 100–103 (OT)				Market Square Arena	2–3
6	November 12, 1996	Detroit	L 79–92				US Airways Arena	2–4
7	November 13, 1996	@ New Jersey	W 106–91				Continental Airlines Arena	3–4
8	November 15, 1996	@ Detroit	L 84–95				The Palace of Auburn Hills	3–5
9	November 16, 1996	Boston	W 106–92				US Airways Arena	4–5
10	November 20, 1996	Seattle	L 110–115 (2OT)				US Airways Arena	4–6
11	November 22, 1996	Philadelphia	W 88–76				US Airways Arena	5–6
12	November 23, 1996	@ Milwaukee	W 95–90				Bradley Center	6–6
13	November 25, 1996	Minnesota	W 105–98				US Airways Arena	7–6
14	November 29, 1996	@ Atlanta	L 81–110				The Omni	7–7
15	November 30, 1996	Houston	L 99–103				US Airways Arena	7–8

December: 8–6 (home: 4–2; road: 4–4)

Game	Date	Team	Score	High points	High rebounds	High assists	Location Attendance	Record
16	December 5, 1996	@ Toronto	L 80–82				SkyDome	7–9
17	December 7, 1996	Milwaukee	L 118–126				US Airways Arena	7–10
18	December 10, 1996	@ New York	L 73–85				Madison Square Garden	7–11
19	December 11, 1996	Cleveland	W 106–95				US Airways Arena	8–11
20	December 13, 1996	Denver	W 108–104				US Airways Arena	9–11
21	December 15, 1996	@ Golden State	W 110–102				San Jose Arena	10–11
22	December 16, 1996	@ Sacramento	W 97–89				ARCO Arena	11–11
23	December 18, 1996	@ Phoenix	L 107–114				America West Arena	11–12
24	December 19, 1996	@ L.A. Clippers	W 102–93				Los Angeles Memorial Sports Arena	12–12
25	December 22, 1996	@ Vancouver	L 87–91				General Motors Place	12–13
26	December 23, 1996	@ Portland	W 106–84				Rose Garden Arena	13–13
27	December 27, 1996	Toronto	W 100–82				US Airways Arena	14–13
28	December 28, 1996	Atlanta (at Baltimore, MD)	W 97–86				Baltimore Arena	15–13
29	December 30, 1996	Charlotte	L 92–101				US Airways Arena	15–14

January: 7–8 (home: 4–2; road: 3–6)

Game	Date	Team	Score	High points	High rebounds	High assists	Location Attendance	Record
30	January 2, 1997	New York	L 80–92				US Airways Arena	15–15
31	January 4, 1997	@ Charlotte	W 104–93				Charlotte Coliseum	16–15
32	January 8, 1997	Phoenix	W 115–113 (OT)				US Airways Arena	17–15
33	January 10, 1997	L.A. Clippers	W 102–98				US Airways Arena	18–15
34	January 11, 1997	@ Cleveland	W 98–85				Gund Arena	19–15
35	January 13, 1997	@ Miami	L 95–93				Miami Arena	19–16
36	January 14, 1997	@ Chicago	L 107–108				United Center	19–17
37	January 17, 1997	Miami (at Baltimore, MD)	L 92–103				Baltimore Arena	19–18
38	January 18, 1997	@ Boston	W 112–106				FleetCenter	20–18
39	January 20, 1997	@ New York	L 79–95				Madison Square Garden	20–19
40	January 21, 1997	@ Orlando	L 88–93				Orlando Arena	20–20
41	January 24, 1997	@ Atlanta	L 105–117 (OT)				The Omni	20–21
42	January 25, 1997	Sacramento	W 113–105				US Airways Arena	21–21
43	January 28, 1997	Orlando	W 102–82				US Airways Arena	22–21
44	January 31, 1997	@ Seattle	L 95–97				KeyArena	22–22

February: 3–9 (home: 3–4; road: 0–5)

Game	Date	Team	Score	High points	High rebounds	High assists	Location Attendance	Record
45	February 2, 1997	@ L.A. Lakers	L 99–129				Great Western Forum	22–23
46	February 3, 1997	@ Utah	L 89–111				Delta Center	22–24
47	February 5, 1997	@ Denver	L 104–106				McNichols Sports Arena	22–25
All-Star Break
48	February 11, 1997	New York	L 92–97				US Airways Arena	22–26
49	February 14, 1997	New Jersey (at Baltimore, MD)	W 125–107				Baltimore Arena	23–26
50	February 15, 1997	@ New Jersey	L 86–107				Continental Airlines Arena	23–27
51	February 17, 1997	Milwaukee	W 95–93				US Airways Arena	24–27
52	February 19, 1997	@ Detroit	L 85–100				The Palace of Auburn Hills	24–28
53	February 21, 1997	Chicago	L 99–103				US Airways Arena	24–29
54	February 23, 1997	Detroit	L 79–85				US Airways Arena	24–30
55	February 25, 1997	Indiana	W 108–87				US Airways Arena	25–30
56	February 27, 1997	L.A. Lakers	L 107–122				US Airways Arena	25–31

March: 11–4 (home: 6–3; road: 5–1)

Game	Date	Team	Score	High points	High rebounds	High assists	Location Attendance	Record
57	March 1, 1997	Golden State	W 118–108				US Airways Arena	26–31
58	March 4, 1997	@ Philadelphia	W 107–106				CoreStates Center	27–31
59	March 6, 1997	@ Miami	W 99–95				Miami Arena	28–31
60	March 7, 1997	Miami	L 105–108 (OT)				US Airways Arena	28–32
61	March 9, 1997	Philadelphia	L 93–99				US Airways Arena	28–33
62	March 12, 1997	Vancouver	W 104–82				US Airways Arena	29–33
63	March 14, 1997	@ Milwaukee	W 105–96				Bradley Center	30–33
64	March 15, 1997	Utah	L 93–100				US Airways Arena	30–34
65	March 17, 1997	@ San Antonio	W 109–85				Alamodome	31–34
66	March 18, 1997	@ Dallas	W 86–85				Reunion Arena	32–34
67	March 20, 1997	@ Houston	L 90–96				The Summit	32–35
68	March 22, 1997	Portland	W 108–104				US Airways Arena	33–35
69	March 26, 1997	Boston	W 105–92				US Airways Arena	34–35
70	March 28, 1997	Toronto	W 113–86				US Airways Arena	35–35
71	March 29, 1997	Dallas (at Baltimore, MD)	W 94–87				Baltimore Arena	36–35

April: 8–3 (home: 4–0; road: 4–3)

Game	Date	Team	Score	High points	High rebounds	High assists	Location Attendance	Record
72	April 1, 1997	@ Indiana	W 104–100				Market Square Arena	37–35
73	April 3, 1997	Chicago	W 110–102				US Airways Arena	38–35
74	April 4, 1997	@ Minnesota	L 95–97				Target Center	38–36
75	April 6, 1997	@ Boston	W 120–114				FleetCenter	39–36
76	April 8, 1997	@ Toronto	L 94–100				SkyDome	39–37
77	April 11, 1997	New Jersey	W 109–90				US Airways Arena	40–37
78	April 12, 1997	@ Charlotte	L 97–99				Charlotte Coliseum	40–38
79	April 14, 1997	@ Philadelphia	W 131–110				CoreStates Center	41–38
80	April 16, 1997	Indiana	W 103–90				US Airways Arena	42–38
81	April 18, 1997	Orlando	W 104–93				US Airways Arena	43–38
82	April 20, 1997	@ Cleveland	W 85–81				Gund Arena	44–38

1996–97 schedule

=== Playoffs ===
1997 playoff game log
First round: 0–3 (home: 0–1; road: 0–2)

Game	Date	Team	Score	High points	High rebounds	High assists	Location Attendance	Series
1	April 25, 1997	@ Chicago	L 86–98	Juwan Howard (21)	Rod Strickland (10)	Rod Strickland (8)	United Center; 24,122	0–1
2	April 27, 1997	@ Chicago	L 104–109	Calbert Cheaney (26)	Chris Webber (12)	Rod Strickland (8)	United Center; 24,267	0–2
3	April 30, 1997	Chicago	L 95–96	Rod Strickland (24)	Chris Webber (8)	Rod Strickland (9)	US Airways Arena; 18,756	0–3

1997 schedule

== Player statistics ==
Legend
GP	Games played	GS	Games started	MPG	Minutes per game
FG%	Field-goal percentage	3P%	3-point field-goal percentage	FT%	Free-throw percentage
RPG	Rebounds per game	APG	Assists per game	SPG	Steals per game
BPG	Blocks per game	PPG	Points per game

=== Regular season ===
Washington Bullets statistics
Player	GP	GS	MPG	FG%	3P%	FT%	RPG	APG	SPG	BPG	PPG
Ashraf Amaya	31	0	4.6	.300	1.000	.536	1.7	.1	.2	.1	1.3
Calbert Cheaney	79	79	30.5	.505	.133	.693	3.4	1.4	1.0	.2	10.6
Matt Fish^{†}	5	0	1.4	.333			1.0	.0	.0	.0	.4
Harvey Grant	78	25	20.6	.411	.315	.769	3.3	.9	.6	.6	4.1
Juwan Howard	82	82	40.5	.486	.000	.756	8.0	3.8	1.1	.3	19.1
Jaren Jackson	75	0	15.1	.407	.335	.768	1.8	.9	.6	.2	5.0
Tim Legler	15	0	12.1	.313	.276	.857	1.4	.5	.2	.3	2.9
Gheorghe Mureșan	73	69	25.3	.604		.618	6.6	.4	.6	1.3	10.6
Tracy Murray	82	1	22.1	.425	.353	.839	3.1	1.0	.8	.2	10.0
Gaylon Nickerson^{†}	1	0	6.0	.333	.000		1.0	.0	1.0	.0	2.0
Rod Strickland	82	81	36.5	.466	.169	.738	4.1	8.9	1.7	.2	17.2
Ben Wallace	34	0	5.8	.348		.300	1.7	.1	.2	.3	1.1
Chris Webber	72	72	39.0	.518	.397	.565	10.3	4.6	1.7	1.9	20.1
Chris Whitney	82	1	13.6	.421	.356	.832	1.3	2.2	.6	.0	5.2
Lorenzo Williams	19	0	13.9	.645		.714	3.6	.2	.3	.4	2.4

=== Playoffs ===
Washington Bullets statistics
Player	GP	GS	MPG	FG%	3P%	FT%	RPG	APG	SPG	BPG	PPG
Calbert Cheaney	3	3	40.0	.439	.000	.750	3.7	1.3	1.0	.7	15.0
Harvey Grant	3	0	9.7	.000	.000		1.3	.0	.0	.7	.0
Juwan Howard	3	3	43.0	.465		.889	6.0	1.7	.7	.7	18.7
Jaren Jackson	3	0	3.7			.000	.7	.3	.0	.0	.0
Tim Legler	3	0	6.3	.000	.000	.500	.3	.7	.0	.0	.3
Gheorghe Mureșan	3	3	23.3	.444		.875	6.0	.0	.0	1.3	5.0
Tracy Murray	3	0	29.0	.567	.500	.941	3.0	.7	1.3	.7	18.3
Rod Strickland	3	3	41.3	.423	.500	.737	6.0	8.3	1.0	.0	19.7
Chris Webber	3	3	35.3	.633	.455	.500	8.0	3.3	.7	2.3	15.7
Chris Whitney	3	0	6.7	.400	.500	1.000	.7	.7	.0	.0	2.3
Lorenzo Williams	2	0	2.5				.0	.0	.0	.0	.0

- ^{†} Denotes player spent time with another team in the season. Stats reflect time with the Bullets only.

Player statistics citation:

== Awards and records ==
No Awards.

== See also ==
- 1996–97 NBA season
