= 1996–97 Cleveland Cavaliers season =

NBA professional basketball team season

- Head coach: Mike Fratello
- General manager: Wayne Embry
- Owners: Gordon Gund; George Gund III
- Arena: Gund Arena

Results
- Record: 42–40 (.512)
- Place: Division: 5th (Central); Conference: 9th (Eastern)
- Playoff finish: Did not qualify
- Stats at Basketball Reference

Local media
- Television: SportsChannel Ohio; WUAB
- Radio: WTAM

The 1996–97 Cleveland Cavaliers season was the 27th season for the Cleveland Cavaliers in the National Basketball Association. The city of Cleveland, Ohio hosted the NBA All-Star weekend at the Gund Arena this season.

== Season summary ==
=== Off-season ===
The Cavaliers acquired the twelfth overall pick in the 1996 NBA draft from the Washington Bullets via trade, and selected Ukrainian center Vitaly Potapenko out of Wright State University; the team also selected Lithuanian center Zydrunas Ilgauskas with the 20th overall pick. However, Ilgauskas would miss the entire regular season due to a broken bone in his right foot. During the off-season, the team signed free agent and former Cavaliers center Mark West.

=== Regular season ===
With the addition of Potapenko, the Cavaliers won nine of their first twelve games of the regular season, and got off to a 21–10 start to the season. However, the team lost 11 of their next 14 games, which included a six-game losing streak in January, and later on held a 25–22 record at the All-Star break. The Cavaliers played above .500 in winning percentage for the entire season, but struggled as the season progressed, losing 10 of their 16 games in March. On the final day of the regular season on April 20, 1997, the Cavaliers faced off against the Washington Bullets at home at the Gund Arena, as both teams were fighting for the eighth seed in the Eastern Conference; the Bullets won the game by a score of 85–81, as the Cavaliers missed the NBA playoffs for the first time since the 1990–91 season, finishing in fifth place in the Central Division with a 42–40 record.

Terrell Brandon averaged 19.5 points, 6.3 assists and 1.8 steals per game, and also contributed 101 three-point field goals, while Chris Mills averaged 13.4 points and 6.2 rebounds per game, and Tyrone Hill provided the team with 12.9 points and 9.9 rebounds per game, and shot .600 in field-goal percentage. In addition, Bobby Phills contributed 12.6 points and 1.6 steals per game, while Danny Ferry provided with 10.6 points per game, and led the Cavaliers with 114 three-point field goals. Off the bench, second-year guard Bob Sura contributed 9.2 points and 4.8 assists per game, while Potapenko averaged 5.8 points and 2.7 rebounds per game, and West provided with 3.2 points and 2.7 rebounds per game, starting at center for half of the regular season.

During the NBA All-Star weekend at the Gund Arena in Cleveland, Brandon was selected for the 1997 NBA All-Star Game, as a member of the Eastern Conference All-Star team; it was his second and final All-Star appearance. Meanwhile, Sura participated in the NBA Slam Dunk Contest, and Potapenko was selected for the NBA Rookie Game, as a member of the Eastern Conference Rookie team.

For the third straight season, the Cavaliers were known as a low-scoring, defensive team led by head coach Mike Fratello's slow-paced, defensive coaching style; the team finished last in the NBA in scoring averaging 87.5 points per game, while allowing 85.6 points per game from their opponents, which was the best in the league, and also had the fifth best team defensive rating. The Cavaliers finished 16th in the NBA in home-game attendance, with an attendance of 692,684 at the Gund Arena during the regular season.

=== Notable highlights ===
On February 27, 1997, the Cavaliers defeated the defending NBA champion Chicago Bulls at the Gund Arena, by a low score of 73–70, in which All-Star guard Michael Jordan missed a three-point shot at the buzzer; the Bulls, along with the Utah Jazz, led the NBA in scoring averaging 103.1 points per game, and also had the third best team defensive rating.

One month later on March 25, the Cavaliers lost to the San Antonio Spurs on the road, 64–59 at the Alamodome, in which both teams combined for a total of 123 points, and combined for 21 points alone in the fourth quarter; it was the second lowest-scoring game in NBA history at the time, and since the shot clock was introduced during the 1954–55 season.

=== Aftermath ===
Following the season, Brandon and Hill were both traded to the Milwaukee Bucks in an off-season three-team trade, while Mills signed as a free agent with the Boston Celtics, who then traded him to the New York Knicks two months later. Meanwhile, Phills signed with the Charlotte Hornets, and West signed with the Indiana Pacers.

== Draft picks ==
| Round | Pick | Player | Position | Nationality | School/Club team |
|---|---|---|---|---|---|
| 1 | 12^{*} | Vitaly Potapenko | Center | Ukraine | Wright State |
| 1 | 20 | Zydrunas Ilgauskas | Center | Lithuania | Atletas |
| 2 | 56^{**} | Reggie Geary | Guard | United States | Arizona |

^{*}1st round pick acquired from Washington in Mark Price deal.
^{**}2nd round pick acquired from Orlando in Steve Kerr deal.

- 2nd round pick (#50) traded to Houston in Keith Hughes deal. Used to draft Terrell Bell.

== Roster ==
1996–97 Cleveland Cavaliers roster
Players

| Pos. | No. | Player | Height | Weight | DOB | From |
|---|---|---|---|---|---|---|
| G | 1 | Terrell Brandon | 5 ft 11 in (1.80 m) | 180 lb (82 kg) | 1970–05–20 | Oregon |
| F | 35 | Danny Ferry | 6 ft 10 in (2.08 m) | 230 lb (104 kg) | 1966–10–17 | Duke |
| G | 2 | Reggie Geary | 6 ft 2 in (1.88 m) | 187 lb (85 kg) | 1973–08–31 | Arizona |
| C | 32 | Tyrone Hill | 6 ft 9 in (2.06 m) | 240 lb (109 kg) | 1968–03–19 | Xavier |
| C | 11 | Zydrunas Ilgauskas (IN) | 7 ft 3 in (2.21 m) | 238 lb (108 kg) | 1975–06–05 | Lithuania |
| F | 21 | Antonio Lang | 6 ft 8 in (2.03 m) | 205 lb (93 kg) | 1972–05–15 | Duke |
| F | 33 | Donny Marshall | 6 ft 7 in (2.01 m) | 230 lb (104 kg) | 1972–07–17 | Connecticut |
| F | 24 | Chris Mills | 6 ft 6 in (1.98 m) | 215 lb (98 kg) | 1970–01–25 | Arizona |
| G | 14 | Bobby Phills | 6 ft 5 in (1.96 m) | 200 lb (91 kg) | 1969–12–20 | Southern |
| C | 52 | Vitaly Potapenko | 6 ft 10 in (2.08 m) | 280 lb (127 kg) | 1975–03–21 | Wright State |
| C | 44 | Shawnelle Scott | 6 ft 10 in (2.08 m) | 250 lb (113 kg) | 1972–06–16 | St. John's |
| G | 3 | Bob Sura | 6 ft 5 in (1.96 m) | 200 lb (91 kg) | 1973–03–25 | Florida State |
| G | 23 | Carl Thomas | 6 ft 4 in (1.93 m) | 175 lb (79 kg) | 1969–10–03 | Eastern Michigan |
| C | 41 | Mark West | 6 ft 10 in (2.08 m) | 230 lb (104 kg) | 1960–11–05 | Old Dominion |

Coaches
Head coach
- Mike Fratello
Assistant(s)
- Jim Boylan
- Sidney Lowe
- Ron Rothstein

Legend
- (DP) Unsigned draft pick
- (FA) Free agent
- (S) Suspended
- (IN) Inactive
- Injured

Roster
Updated: September 23, 1996

=== Roster Notes ===
- Rookie center Zydrunas Ilgauskas was on the injured reserve list due to a broken bone in his right foot, and missed the entire regular season.

== Regular season ==
=== Season standings ===
| Central Division | W | L | PCT | GB | Home | Road | Div |
|---|---|---|---|---|---|---|---|
| y-Chicago Bulls | 69 | 13 | .841 | – | 39–2 | 30–11 | 24–4 |
| x-Atlanta Hawks | 56 | 26 | .683 | 13 | 36–5 | 20–21 | 17–11 |
| x-Detroit Pistons | 54 | 28 | .659 | 15 | 30–11 | 24–17 | 17–11 |
| x-Charlotte Hornets | 54 | 28 | .659 | 15 | 30–11 | 24–17 | 14–14 |
| Cleveland Cavaliers | 42 | 40 | .512 | 27 | 25–16 | 17–24 | 13–15 |
| Indiana Pacers | 39 | 43 | .476 | 30 | 21–20 | 18–23 | 11–17 |
| Milwaukee Bucks | 33 | 49 | .402 | 36 | 20–21 | 13–28 | 10–18 |
| Toronto Raptors | 30 | 52 | .366 | 39 | 18–23 | 12–29 | 6–22 |

1996–97 NBA East standings
| # | Eastern Conference | | | | |
| # | Team | W | L | PCT | GB |
|---|---|---|---|---|---|
| 1 | z-Chicago Bulls | 69 | 13 | .841 | – |
| 2 | y-Miami Heat | 61 | 21 | .744 | 8 |
| 3 | x-New York Knicks | 57 | 25 | .695 | 12 |
| 4 | x-Atlanta Hawks | 56 | 26 | .683 | 13 |
| 5 | x-Detroit Pistons | 54 | 28 | .659 | 15 |
| 6 | x-Charlotte Hornets | 54 | 28 | .659 | 15 |
| 7 | x-Orlando Magic | 45 | 37 | .549 | 24 |
| 8 | x-Washington Bullets | 44 | 38 | .537 | 25 |
| 9 | Cleveland Cavaliers | 42 | 40 | .512 | 27 |
| 10 | Indiana Pacers | 39 | 43 | .476 | 30 |
| 11 | Milwaukee Bucks | 33 | 49 | .402 | 36 |
| 12 | Toronto Raptors | 30 | 52 | .366 | 39 |
| 13 | New Jersey Nets | 26 | 56 | .317 | 43 |
| 14 | Philadelphia 76ers | 22 | 60 | .268 | 47 |
| 15 | Boston Celtics | 15 | 67 | .183 | 54 |

=== Game log ===
1996–97 game log
Total: 42–40 (home: 25–16; road: 17–24)
November: 9–5 (home: 5–3; road: 4–2)

| Game | Date | Team | Score | High points | High rebounds | High assists | Location Attendance | Record |

December : 10–5 (home: 8–1; road: 2–4)

| Game | Date | Team | Score | High points | High rebounds | High assists | Location Attendance | Record |

January : 5–9 (home: 3–5; road: 2–4)

| Game | Date | Team | Score | High points | High rebounds | High assists | Location Attendance | Record |

February : 7–5 (home: 3–2; road: 4–3)

| Game | Date | Team | Score | High points | High rebounds | High assists | Location Attendance | Record |

March : 6–10 (home: 4–2; road: 2–8)

| Game | Date | Team | Score | High points | High rebounds | High assists | Location Attendance | Record |

April : 5–6 (home: 2–3; road: 3–3)

| Game | Date | Team | Score | High points | High rebounds | High assists | Location Attendance | Record |

1996–97 schedule

== Player stats ==
Legend
| GP | Games played | GS | Games started | MPG | Minutes per game |
| FG% | Field-goal percentage | 3P% | 3-point field-goal percentage | FT% | Free-throw percentage |
| RPG | Rebounds per game | APG | Assists per game | SPG | Steals per game |
| BPG | Blocks per game | PPG | Points per game |

=== Regular season ===
| Player | GP | GS | MPG | FG% | 3P% | FT% | RPG | APG | SPG | BPG | PPG |
|---|---|---|---|---|---|---|---|---|---|---|---|
| Terrell Brandon | 78 | 78 | 36.8 | 43.8 | 37.3 | 90.2 | 3.9 | 6.3 | 1.8 | 0.4 | 19.5 |
| Chris Mills | 80 | 79 | 39.6 | 45.3 | 39.1 | 84.2 | 6.2 | 2.5 | 1.1 | 0.5 | 13.4 |
| Tyrone Hill | 74 | 70 | 34.9 | 60.0 | 0.0 | 63.3 | 9.9 | 1.2 | 0.9 | 0.4 | 12.9 |
| Bobby Phills | 69 | 65 | 34.4 | 42.8 | 39.4 | 71.8 | 3.6 | 3.4 | 1.6 | 0.3 | 12.6 |
| Danny Ferry | 82 | 48 | 32.1 | 42.9 | 40.1 | 85.1 | 4.1 | 1.8 | 0.7 | 0.4 | 10.6 |
| Bob Sura | 82 | 23 | 27.7 | 43.1 | 32.3 | 61.4 | 3.8 | 4.8 | 1.1 | 0.4 | 9.2 |
| Vitaly Potapenko | 80 | 3 | 15.5 | 44.0 | 50.0 | 73.6 | 2.7 | 0.5 | 0.3 | 0.4 | 5.8 |
| Mark West | 70 | 43 | 13.7 | 55.6 | 0.0 | 48.2 | 2.7 | 0.3 | 0.2 | 0.8 | 3.2 |
| Donny Marshall | 56 | 0 | 9.8 | 32.5 | 37.9 | 70.4 | 1.3 | 0.4 | 0.4 | 0.1 | 3.1 |
| Antonio Lang | 64 | 1 | 13.2 | 42.0 | 0.0 | 72.9 | 2.0 | 0.5 | 0.5 | 0.5 | 2.7 |
| Reggie Geary | 39 | 0 | 6.3 | 37.9 | 38.1 | 45.5 | 0.4 | 0.9 | 0.3 | 0.1 | 1.5 |
| Shawnelle Scott | 16 | 0 | 3.1 | 50.0 | 0.0 | 36.4 | 1.0 | 0.0 | 0.0 | 0.2 | 1.3 |
| Carl Thomas | 19 | 0 | 4.1 | 37.5 | 16.7 | 100.0 | 0.7 | 0.4 | 0.1 | 0.1 | 1.1 |

Player statistics citation:

== Awards and records ==
=== All-Star ===
Terrell Brandon - 1997 NBA All-Star Game
