= Chris Whitney =

American basketball player

Personal information
- Born: October 5, 1971 (age 55) Hopkinsville, Kentucky, U.S.
- Listed height: 6 ft 0 in (1.83 m)
- Listed weight: 168 lb (76 kg)

Career information
- High school: Christian County (Hopkinsville, Kentucky)
- College: Lincoln Trail (1989–1991); Clemson (1991–1993)
- NBA draft: 1993: 2nd round, 47th overall pick
- Drafted by: San Antonio Spurs
- Playing career: 1993–2004
- Position: Point guard
- Number: 20, 12

Career history
- 1993–1995: San Antonio Spurs
- 1995–1996: Rapid City Thrillers / Florida Beachdogs
- 1996–2002: Washington Bullets / Wizards
- 2002–2003: Denver Nuggets
- 2003: Orlando Magic
- 2003–2004: Washington Wizards

Career highlights
- Third-team All-ACC (1993)

Career NBA statistics
- Points: 3,738 (6.5 ppg)
- Rebounds: 815 (1.4 rpg)
- Assists: 1,613 (2.8 apg)
- Stats at NBA.com
- Stats at Basketball Reference

Christofer Antwone Whitney (born October 5, 1971) is an American former professional basketball player.

Whitney was born in Hopkinsville, Kentucky. A 6'0" point guard from Lincoln Trail College and then Clemson University, Whitney was selected by the San Antonio Spurs in the second round of the 1993 NBA draft. He played 11 seasons (1993–2004) in the NBA, spending time with the Spurs as well as the Washington Bullets/Wizards, Denver Nuggets, and Orlando Magic.

He finished his NBA career with averages of 6.5 points, 2.8 assists and 1.4 rebounds in 579 games, mostly with the Wizards. He spent 8 years as the Director of Player Development for the Charlotte Hornets from 2010 to 2018.

Chris is married to Charlotta Whitney and has 6 children.

== NBA career statistics ==
Legend
GP	Games played	GS	Games started	MPG	Minutes per game
FG%	Field goal percentage	3P%	3-point field goal percentage	FT%	Free throw percentage
RPG	Rebounds per game	APG	Assists per game	SPG	Steals per game
BPG	Blocks per game	PPG	Points per game	**Bold**	Career high
*	Led the league

=== Regular season ===
Year	Team	GP	GS	MPG	FG%	3P%	FT%	RPG	APG	SPG	BPG	PPG
1993–94	San Antonio	40	4	8.5	.305	.333	.800	.7	1.3	.3	.0	1.8
1994–95	San Antonio	25	0	7.2	.298	.158	**1.000**	.5	1.1	.2	.0	1.7
1995–96	Washington	21	0	16.0	**.455**	.432	.932	1.6	2.4	**.9**	.0	7.1
1996–97	Washington	**82**	1	13.6	.421	.356	.832	1.3	2.2	.6	.0	5.2
1997–98	Washington	**82***	6	13.1	.355	.308	.915	1.4	2.4	.4	**.1**	5.1
1998–99	Washington	39	1	11.3	.410	.337	.871	1.2	1.8	.5	**.1**	4.8
1999–00	Washington	**82**	15	19.8	.417	.376	.848	1.6	3.8	.7	**.1**	7.8
2000–01	Washington	59	31	26.0	.387	.375	.894	1.8	4.2	**.9**	**.1**	9.5
2001–02	Washington	**82**	**81**	**26.5**	.418	.406	.880	**1.9**	3.8	**.9**	**.1**	**10.2**
2002–03	Denver	29	20	26.3	.360	.336	.807	1.6	**4.3**	.6	.0	9.6
2002–03	Orlando	22	1	13.1	.341	.194	.917	1.0	1.0	.5	.0	3.5
2003–04	Washington	16	5	11.6	.378	**.444**	**1.000**	.9	.9	.4	**.1**	2.9
Career		579	165	17.4	.395	.361	.875	1.4	2.8	.6	.1	6.5

=== Playoffs ===
Year	Team	GP	GS	MPG	FG%	3P%	FT%	RPG	APG	SPG	BPG	PPG
1997	Washington	3	0	6.7	**.400**	**.500**	**1.000**	.7	.7	.0	.0	2.3
2003	Orlando	**7**	0	**15.9**	.381	.444	**1.000**	**1.6**	**1.0**	**.3**	**.3**	**3.1**
Career		10	0	13.1	.385	.462	1.000	1.3	.9	.2	.2	2.9
