= 1996–97 Toronto Raptors season =

NBA professional basketball team season

- Head coach: Darrell Walker
- General manager: Isiah Thomas
- Owner: John Bitove
- Arena: SkyDome; Copps Coliseum; Maple Leaf Gardens

Results
- Record: 30–52 (.366)
- Place: Division: 8th (Central); Conference: 12th (Eastern)
- Playoff finish: Did not qualify
- Stats at Basketball Reference

Local media
- Television: TSN; CKVR; CityTV; CTV
- Radio: CFRB

The 1996–97 Toronto Raptors season was the second season for the Toronto Raptors in the National Basketball Association.

== Season summary ==
=== Off-season ===
After finishing with a 21–61 record in their inaugural season, the Raptors received the second overall pick in the 1996 NBA draft, and selected center Marcus Camby from the University of Massachusetts. During the off-season, the team hired assistant coach Darrell Walker as their new head coach, signed free agent Walt Williams, acquired Popeye Jones from the Dallas Mavericks, acquired three-point specialist Hubert Davis from the New York Knicks, and signed John Long, who came out of his retirement. The team also signed Benoit Benjamin, but released him to free agency in November after only four games.

=== Regular season ===
Celebrating the 50th anniversary of the NBA in their regular season opener on November 1, 1996, the Raptors played against the New York Knicks at the SkyDome. The game marked the 50th anniversary of the first ever NBA game played, between the Knicks and the Toronto Huskies at Maple Leaf Gardens on November 1, 1946, back when the league was known as the BAA (Basketball Association of America). The Raptors wore throwback uniforms of the Huskies, but lost to the Knicks at home, 107–99; second-year star Damon Stoudamire finished with a double-double of 28 points and 10 assists, while Doug Christie added 24 points, 7 assists and 4 steals.

Under Walker and with the addition of Camby, Williams and Jones, the Raptors played around .500 in winning percentage with a 3–3 start to the regular season, but then posted a six-game losing streak afterwards, and later on held a 17–29 record at the All-Star break. At mid-season, the team re-signed free agent Oliver Miller after a brief stint with the Dallas Mavericks, and traded Acie Earl to the Milwaukee Bucks in exchange for second-year guard Shawn Respert, while signing free agents Reggie Slater and Clifford Rozier. The Raptors finished in last place in the Central Division with a 30–52 record, which was a nine-game improvement over their inaugural season.

Stoudamire averaged 20.2 points, 8.8 assists and 1.5 steals per game, and led the Raptors with 176 three-point field goals, while Williams averaged 16.4 points and 5.0 rebounds per game, and contributed 175 three-point field goals, and Camby provided the team with 14.8 points, 6.3 rebounds and 2.1 blocks per game, and was named to the NBA All-Rookie First Team. In addition, Christie contributed 14.5 points, 5.3 rebounds, 3.9 assists and 2.5 steals per game, along with 147 three-point field goals, while Carlos Rogers averaged 9.8 points and 5.4 rebounds per game, Jones provided with 7.8 points and 8.6 rebounds per game, and Slater contributed 7.8 points and 3.7 rebounds per game in 26 games. Meanwhile, Sharone Wright averaged 6.5 points and 3.1 rebounds per game, Miller provided with 6.0 points and 3.8 rebounds per game in 19 games, Respert contributed 5.6 points per game in 27 games after the trade, Davis contributed 5.0 points per game, but only played just 36 games due to injury, and Rozier provided with 4.6 points and 5.7 rebounds per game in 41 games.

During the NBA All-Star weekend at the Gund Arena in Cleveland, Ohio, Williams participated in the NBA Three-Point Shootout, while Camby was selected for the NBA Rookie Game, as a member of the Eastern Conference Rookie team. Camby scored 18 points along with 12 rebounds and 4 assists, as the Eastern Conference defeated the Western Conference, 96–91. Christie finished in second place in Most Improved Player voting, behind Isaac Austin of the Miami Heat.

The Raptors finished eighth in the NBA in home-game attendance, with an attendance of 744,550 at the SkyDome during the regular season.

=== Aftermath ===
Following the season, Davis signed as a free agent with the Dallas Mavericks, while Rozier signed with the Minnesota Timberwolves, and Long retired.

== Draft picks ==
| Round | Pick | Player | Position | Nationality | College |
|---|---|---|---|---|---|
| 1 | 2 | Marcus Camby | C/PF | United States | UMass |

== Roster ==
1996–97 Toronto Raptors roster
Players

| Pos. | No. | Player | Height | Weight | DOB | From |
|---|---|---|---|---|---|---|
| C | 21 | Marcus Camby | 6 ft 11 in (2.11 m) | 220 lb (100 kg) | 1974–03–22 | UMass |
| G | 13 | Doug Christie | 6 ft 6 in (1.98 m) | 200 lb (91 kg) | 1970–05–09 | Pepperdine |
| G | 44 | Hubert Davis | 6 ft 5 in (1.96 m) | 183 lb (83 kg) | 1970–05–17 | North Carolina |
| F | 54 | Popeye Jones | 6 ft 8 in (2.03 m) | 250 lb (113 kg) | 1970–06–17 | Murray State |
| F | 32 | Martin Lewis | 6 ft 5 in (1.96 m) | 210 lb (95 kg) | 1975–04–28 | Seward County CC |
| G | 25 | John Long | 6 ft 5 in (1.96 m) | 195 lb (88 kg) | 1956–08–28 | Detroit Mercy |
| C | 2 | Oliver Miller | 6 ft 9 in (2.06 m) | 280 lb (127 kg) | 1970–04–06 | Arkansas |
| G | 31 | Shawn Respert | 6 ft 3 in (1.91 m) | 195 lb (88 kg) | 1972–02–06 | Michigan State |
| F | 34 | Carlos Rogers | 6 ft 11 in (2.11 m) | 220 lb (100 kg) | 1971–02–06 | Tennessee State |
| C | 7 | Clifford Rozier | 6 ft 11 in (2.11 m) | 245 lb (111 kg) | 1972–10–31 | Louisville |
| F | 24 | Reggie Slater | 6 ft 7 in (2.01 m) | 215 lb (98 kg) | 1970–08–27 | Wyoming |
| G | 20 | Damon Stoudamire | 5 ft 10 in (1.78 m) | 171 lb (78 kg) | 1973–09–03 | Arizona |
| C | 3 | Žan Tabak | 7 ft 0 in (2.13 m) | 245 lb (111 kg) | 1970–06–15 | Croatia |
| F | 42 | Walt Williams | 6 ft 8 in (2.03 m) | 219 lb (99 kg) | 1970–04–16 | Maryland |
| C | 4 | Sharone Wright | 6 ft 11 in (2.11 m) | 260 lb (118 kg) | 1973–01–30 | Clemson |

Coaches
Head coach
- Darrell Walker
Assistant(s)
- John Shumate
- Jim Thomas
- Bob Zuffelato

Legend
- (DP) Unsigned draft pick
- (FA) Free agent
- (S) Suspended
- Injured

Roster
Updated: February 20, 1997

== Regular season ==
=== Highs ===
- November 1, 1996 – To commemorate the 50th Anniversary of the NBA, the first game of the season was played between the Raptors and the New York Knicks. Both teams wore throwback uniforms to recognize the anniversary. The Raptors wore the jerseys of the Toronto Huskies. The reason the game was played in Toronto was to recognize that the first ever NBA game was played in Toronto. The final score was 107–99 for the Knicks.
- November 8, 1996 – The Raptors pulled a huge upset by defeating the Los Angeles Lakers by a score of 93–92. One of the game's highlights was Popeye Jones blocking a shot by Shaquille O'Neal.
- December 8, 1996 – In a game against the defending NBA Champion Chicago Bulls, the Raptors pulled another upset by defeating the Bulls 97–89
- February 25, 1997 – Versus the Denver Nuggets, the Raptors had their highest point total of the season. The final score was 124–122 for the Raptors.

=== Lows ===
- January 15, 1997 – The Raptors suffer one of their worst losses of the season. It was at the hands of the defending Western Conference champion Seattle SuperSonics by a score of 122–78.

=== Season standings ===
| Central Division | W | L | PCT | GB | Home | Road | Div |
|---|---|---|---|---|---|---|---|
| y-Chicago Bulls | 69 | 13 | .841 | – | 39–2 | 30–11 | 24–4 |
| x-Atlanta Hawks | 56 | 26 | .683 | 13 | 36–5 | 20–21 | 17–11 |
| x-Detroit Pistons | 54 | 28 | .659 | 15 | 30–11 | 24–17 | 17–11 |
| x-Charlotte Hornets | 54 | 28 | .659 | 15 | 30–11 | 24–17 | 14–14 |
| Cleveland Cavaliers | 42 | 40 | .512 | 27 | 25–16 | 17–24 | 13–15 |
| Indiana Pacers | 39 | 43 | .476 | 30 | 21–20 | 18–23 | 11–17 |
| Milwaukee Bucks | 33 | 49 | .402 | 36 | 20–21 | 13–28 | 10–18 |
| Toronto Raptors | 30 | 52 | .366 | 39 | 18–23 | 12–29 | 6–22 |

1996–97 NBA East standings
| # | Eastern Conference | | | | |
| # | Team | W | L | PCT | GB |
|---|---|---|---|---|---|
| 1 | z-Chicago Bulls | 69 | 13 | .841 | – |
| 2 | y-Miami Heat | 61 | 21 | .744 | 8 |
| 3 | x-New York Knicks | 57 | 25 | .695 | 12 |
| 4 | x-Atlanta Hawks | 56 | 26 | .683 | 13 |
| 5 | x-Detroit Pistons | 54 | 28 | .659 | 15 |
| 6 | x-Charlotte Hornets | 54 | 28 | .659 | 15 |
| 7 | x-Orlando Magic | 45 | 37 | .549 | 24 |
| 8 | x-Washington Bullets | 44 | 38 | .537 | 25 |
| 9 | Cleveland Cavaliers | 42 | 40 | .512 | 27 |
| 10 | Indiana Pacers | 39 | 43 | .476 | 30 |
| 11 | Milwaukee Bucks | 33 | 49 | .402 | 36 |
| 12 | Toronto Raptors | 30 | 52 | .366 | 39 |
| 13 | New Jersey Nets | 26 | 56 | .317 | 43 |
| 14 | Philadelphia 76ers | 22 | 60 | .268 | 47 |
| 15 | Boston Celtics | 15 | 67 | .183 | 54 |

=== Game log ===
1996–97 game log
November: 4–10 (home: 4–6; road: 0–4)

| Game | Date | Team | Score | High points | High rebounds | High assists | Location Attendance | Record |
|---|---|---|---|---|---|---|---|---|
| 1 | November 1 | New York | L 99–107 | Damon Stoudamire (28) | Popeye Jones (9) | Damon Stoudamire (10) | SkyDome; 28,457 | 0–1 |
| 2 | November 2 | @ Charlotte | L 98–109 | Damon Stoudamire (19) | Carlos Rogers (8) | Damon Stoudamire (5) | Charlotte Coliseum; 24,042 | 0–2 |
| 3 | November 5 | Dallas | W 100–96 | Walt Williams (34) | Carlos Rogers (12) | Damon Stoudamire (8) | SkyDome; 17,065 | 1–2 |
| 4 | November 8 | L.A. Lakers | W 93–92 | Damon Stoudamire (21) | Damon Stoudamire (10) | Damon Stoudamire (10) | SkyDome; 27,357 | 2-2 |
| 5 | November 11 | Denver | L 93–104 | Marcus Camby (26) | Carlos Rogers (9) | Damon Stoudamire (6) | SkyDome; 17,132 | 2–3 |
| 6 | November 13 | Philadelphia | W 110–98 | Marcus Camby (23) | Popeye Jones (14) | Damon Stoudamire (12) | SkyDome; 17,385 | 3-3 |
| 7 | November 14 | @ New York | L 96–99 | Marcus Camby (29) | Popeye Jones (8) | Damon Stoudamire (13) | Madison Square Garden; 19,763 | 3–4 |
| 8 | November 16 | @ Orlando | L 87–92 | Walt Williams (29) | Doug Christie (7) | Damon Stoudamire (5) | Orlando Arena; 17,248 | 3–5 |
| 9 | November 19 | Seattle | L 98–106 | Doug Christie (31) | Popeye Jones (11) | Marcus Camby (4) | SkyDome; 18,803 | 3–6 |
| 10 | November 21 | Cleveland | L 81–89 | Damon Stoudamire (24) | Acie Earl (8) | Damon Stoudamire (6) | SkyDome; 16,835 | 3–7 |
| 11 | November 23 | Atlanta | L 88–91 | Damon Stoudamire (22) | Popeye Jones (9) | Damon Stoudamire (8) | SkyDome; 16,838 | 3–8 |
| 12 | November 26 | Sacramento | L 87–98 | Damon Stoudamire (27) | Popeye Jones (16) | Damon Stoudamire (6) | SkyDome; 15,037 | 3–9 |
| 13 | November 27 | Charlotte | W 92–88 | Walt Williams (23) | Popeye Jones (18) | Damon Stoudamire (6) | SkyDome; 15,710 | 4–9 |
| 14 | November 30 | @ Minnesota | L 70–79 | Damon Stoudamire (20) | Popeye Jones (15) | Doug Christie, Damon Stoudamire (4) | Target Center; 18,679 | 4–10 |

December: 6–9 (home: 5–2; road: 1–7)

| Game | Date | Team | Score | High points | High rebounds | High assists | Location Attendance | Record |
|---|---|---|---|---|---|---|---|---|
| 15 | December 2 | Houston | W 100–89 | Damon Stoudamire (27) | Popeye Jones (13) | Damon Stoudamire (11) | SkyDome; 17,108 | 5–10 |
| 16 | December 3 | @ Cleveland | L 74–93 | Doug Christie, Acie Earl (16) | Popeye Jones (9) | Damon Stoudamire (11) | Gund Arena; 13,494 | 5–11 |
| 17 | December 5 | Washington | W 82–80 | Walt Williams (29) | Popeye Jones (13) | Damon Stoudamire (9) | SkyDome; 15,222 | 6–11 |
| 18 | December 7 | @ Atlanta | L 75–101 | Walt Williams (17) | Popeye Jones (10) | Doug Christie, Damon Stoudamire (3) | Omni Coliseum; 11,422 | 6–12 |
| 19 | December 8 | Chicago | W 97–89 | Damon Stoudamire (31) | Popeye Jones (18) | Damon Stoudamire (13) | SkyDome; 33,385 | 7–12 |
| 20 | December 10 | Golden State | L 91–101 | Damon Stoudamire (19) | Carlos Rogers (8) | Damon Stoudamire (10) | SkyDome; 15,132 | 7–13 |
| 21 | December 11 | @ Boston | L 113–115 (3OT) | Damon Stoudamire (31) | Popeye Jones (21) | Damon Stoudamire (12) | FleetCenter; 14,760 | 7–14 |
| 22 | December 14 | @ Miami | L 88–89 | Walt Williams (18) | Doug Christie, Carlos Rogers (8) | Doug Christie (6) | Miami Arena; 14,712 | 7–15 |
| 23 | December 16 | Detroit | L 92–98 | Damon Stoudamire (28) | Doug Christie, Carlos Rogers (6) | Damon Stoudamire (8) | SkyDome; 16,546 | 7–16 |
| 24 | December 17 | @ New Jersey | W 97–88 | Walt Williams (24) | Popeye Jones (12) | Doug Christie, Popeye Jones (3) | Continental Airlines Arena; 10,078 | 8–16 |
| 25 | December 19 | Milwaukee | W 96–93 | Damon Stoudamire (19) | Popeye Jones (17) | Damon Stoudamire (12) | SkyDome; 15,321 | 9–16 |
| 26 | December 20 | @ Cleveland | L 82–91 | Carlos Rogers (18) | Doug Christie (8) | Damon Stoudamire (7) | Gund Arena; 14,624 | 9–17 |
| 27 | December 22 | @ Indiana | L 92–111 | Carlos Rogers (15) | Popeye Jones (11) | Damon Stoudamire, Walt Williams (3) | Market Square Arena; 14,533 | 9–18 |
| 28 | December 26 | New Jersey | W 98–96 | Damon Stoudamire (18) | Popeye Jones (11) | Doug Christie (7) | Copps Coliseum; 16,630 | 9–19 |
| 29 | December 27 | @ Washington | L 82–100 | Doug Christie (20) | Marcus Camby (10) | Damon Stoudamire (8) | USAir Arena; 18,756 | 10–19 |

January: 5–9 (home: 3–3; road: 2–6)

| Game | Date | Team | Score | High points | High rebounds | High assists | Location Attendance | Record |
|---|---|---|---|---|---|---|---|---|
| 30 | January 2 | @ Orlando | L 94–96 (OT) | Damon Stoudamire (32) | Popeye Jones (11) | Damon Stoudamire (12) | Orlando Arena; 17,248 | 10–20 |
| 31 | January 4 | @ Detroit | L 74–118 | Doug Christie (20) | Popeye Jones (7) | Damon Stoudamire (5) | The Palace of Auburn Hills; 21,454 | 10–21 |
| 32 | January 7 | L.A. Clippers | L 80–87 | Damon Stoudamire (25) | Doug Christie (11) | Damon Stoudamire (9) | SkyDome; 15,249 | 10–22 |
| 33 | January 9 | Utah | W 110–96 | Damon Stoudamire (27) | Popeye Jones (14) | Doug Christie (10) | SkyDome; 12,410 | 11–22 |
| 34 | January 11 | @ New Jersey | W 123–106 | Damon Stoudamire, Walt Williams (28) | Marcus Camby, Popeye Jones (9) | Doug Christie, Damon Stoudamire (9) | Continental Airlines Arena; 15,527 | 12–22 |
| 35 | January 12 | Orlando | L 85–88 | Walt Williams (22) | Popeye Jones (10) | Damon Stoudamire (14) | SkyDome; 21,416 | 12–23 |
| 36 | January 15 | @ Seattle | L 78–122 | Doug Christie, Carlos Rogers (15) | Carlos Rogers, Walt Williams (7) | Damon Stoudamire (7) | KeyArena; 17,072 | 12–24 |
| 37 | January 17 | @ Portland | W 94–92 | Damon Stoudamire (24) | Popeye Jones (12) | Doug Christie (8) | Rose Garden; 20,212 | 13–24 |
| 38 | January 19 | @ Vancouver | L 92–100 | Damon Stoudamire (34) | Marcus Camby (11) | Damon Stoudamire (6) | General Motors Place; 17,474 | 13–25 |
| 39 | January 21 | Minnesota | W 118–106 | Walt Williams (32) | Popeye Jones (10) | Damon Stoudamire (17) | SkyDome; 15,589 | 14–25 |
| 40 | January 23 | Miami | L 87–99 | Walt Williams (23) | Marcus Camby (10) | Damon Stoudamire (11) | SkyDome; 15,817 | 14–26 |
| 41 | January 25 | @ Chicago | L 98–110 | Damon Stoudamire (26) | Popeye Jones (16) | Damon Stoudamire (11) | United Center; 23,913 | 14–27 |
| 42 | January 28 | Portland | W 120–84 | Doug Christie (33) | Clifford Rozier (11) | Damon Stoudamire (13) | SkyDome; 15,327 | 15–27 |
| 43 | January 29 | @ Philadelphia | L 99–101 | Damon Stoudamire (25) | Popeye Jones (10) | Doug Christie (6) | CoreStates Center; 11,251 | 15–28 |

February: 5–9 (home: 2–4; road: 3–5)

| Game | Date | Team | Score | High points | High rebounds | High assists | Location Attendance | Record |
|---|---|---|---|---|---|---|---|---|
| 44 | February 1 | Phoenix | W 110–86 | Walt Williams (33) | Popeye Jones (14) | Damon Stoudamire (13) | SkyDome; 19,405 | 16–28 |
| 45 | February 3 | Boston | L 102–114 | Damon Stoudamire (26) | Popeye Jones (11) | Damon Stoudamire (10) | SkyDome; 15,259 | 16–29 |
| 46 | February 5 | Cleveland | W 89–84 | Walt Williams (26) | Clifford Rozier (9) | Damon Stoudamire (10) | SkyDome; 16,520 | 17–29 |
| 47 | February 11 | @ Milwaukee | L 96–101 | Walt Williams (27) | Popeye Jones (14) | Damon Stoudamire (12) | Bradley Center; 13,257 | 17–30 |
| 48 | February 12 | @ Atlanta | L 84–106 | Damon Stoudamire, Walt Williams (15) | Clifford Rozier (7) | Damon Stoudamire (3) | Omni Coliseum; 13,846 | 17–31 |
| 49 | February 14 | Milwaukee | L 102–106 | Marcus Camby (21) | Oliver Miller (12) | Damon Stoudamire (14) | Maple Leaf Gardens; 15,193 | 17–32 |
| 50 | February 16 | Detroit | L 89–92 | Walt Williams (22) | Clifford Rozier (11) | Damon Stoudamire (15) | Maple Leaf Gardens; 15,492 | 17–33 |
| 51 | February 17 | @ Indiana | L 103–105 | Damon Stoudamire (23) | Oliver Miller (8) | Damon Stoudamire (11) | Market Square Arena; 14,298 | 17–34 |
| 52 | February 19 | @ San Antonio | W 125–92 | Damon Stoudamire (21) | Popeye Jones (11) | Damon Stoudamire (9) | Alamodome; 13,179 | 18–34 |
| 53 | February 20 | @ Houston | L 97–107 | Damon Stoudamire (17) | Popeye Jones (10) | Damon Stoudamire (7) | The Summit; 16,285 | 18–35 |
| 54 | February 22 | @ Dallas | W 99–92 | Doug Christie (22) | Oliver Miller (8) | Damon Stoudamire (9) | Reunion Arena; 16,314 | 19–35 |
| 55 | February 25 | @ Denver | W 124–122 (OT) | Damon Stoudamire (35) | Popeye Jones (7) | Damon Stoudamire (5) | McNichols Sports Arena; 9,225 | 20–35 |
| 56 | February 27 | @ Utah | L 114–118 | Walt Williams (32) | Popeye Jones, Carlos Rogers (8) | Damon Stoudamire (8) | Delta Center; 19,911 | 20–36 |
| 57 | February 28 | @ L.A. Clippers | L 92–94 | Damon Stoudamire (22) | Carlos Rogers (11) | Doug Christie, Damon Stoudamire (5) | Los Angeles Memorial Sports Arena; 8,574 | 20–37 |

March: 6–10 (home: 3–7; road: 3–3)

| Game | Date | Team | Score | High points | High rebounds | High assists | Location Attendance | Record |
|---|---|---|---|---|---|---|---|---|
| 58 | March 3 | Boston | L 103–107 | Carlos Rogers (17) | Carlos Rogers, Damon Stoudamire (7) | Damon Stoudamire (17) | SkyDome; 15,385 | 20–38 |
| 59 | March 5 | New York | L 94–100 | Marcus Camby, Doug Christie (24) | Marcus Camby (9) | Damon Stoudamire (8) | SkyDome; 18,319 | 20–39 |
| 60 | March 7 | San Antonio | L 103–106 | Damon Stoudamire (25) | Marcus Camby (9) | Doug Christie (9) | SkyDome; 16,178 | 20–40 |
| 61 | March 9 | Vancouver | W 81–77 | Walt Williams (16) | Marcus Camby (12) | Damon Stoudamire (10) | SkyDome; 19,186 | 21–40 |
| 62 | March 11 | @ Phoenix | W 105–101 | Marcus Camby (23) | Clifford Rozier (14) | Damon Stoudamire (9) | America West Arena; 19,023 | 22–40 |
| 63 | March 13 | @ Sacramento | W 103–96 | Damon Stoudamire (31) | Marcus Camby, Walt Williams (6) | Damon Stoudamire (6) | ARCO Arena; 17,317 | 23–40 |
| 64 | March 15 | @ Golden State | L 102–106 | Marcus Camby (27) | Marcus Camby (9) | Damon Stoudamire (14) | San Jose Arena; 15,058 | 23–41 |
| 65 | March 16 | @ L.A. Lakers | L 90–98 (OT) | Damon Stoudamire (25) | Marcus Camby (11) | Damon Stoudamire (8) | Great Western Forum; 16,839 | 23–42 |
| 66 | March 18 | Philadelphia | W 117–105 | Marcus Camby (36) | Doug Christie, Damon Stoudamire (10) | Damon Stoudamire (12) | Maple Leaf Gardens; 15,219 | 24–42 |
| 67 | March 19 | @ Detroit | W 99–97 | Marcus Camby (28) | Marcus Camby (14) | Doug Christie (7) | The Palace of Auburn Hills; 21,454 | 25–42 |
| 68 | March 21 | Charlotte | L 97–102 | Damon Stoudamire (29) | Marcus Camby (16) | Doug Christie (9) | SkyDome; 16,993 | 25–43 |
| 69 | March 23 | Atlanta | L 79–90 | Marcus Camby (37) | Marcus Camby, Walt Williams (8) | Damon Stoudamire (9) | SkyDome; 18,533 | 25–44 |
| 70 | March 25 | Indiana | L 84–98 | Walt Williams (16) | Marcus Camby (10) | Damon Stoudamire (6) | SkyDome; 15,763 | 25–45 |
| 71 | March 27 | Chicago | L 83–96 | Damon Stoudamire (18) | Clifford Rozier (10) | Damon Stoudamire (12) | SkyDome; 34,104 | 25–46 |
| 72 | March 28 | @ Washington | L 86–113 | Doug Christie (17) | Reggie Slater (10) | Damon Stoudamire (3) | USAir Arena; 18,756 | 25–47 |
| 73 | March 30 | Miami | W 102–97 | Damon Stoudamire (35) | Popeye Jones (12) | Damon Stoudamire (11) | SkyDome; 17,959 | 26–47 |

April: 4–5 (home: 1–2; road: 3–3)

| Game | Date | Team | Score | High points | High rebounds | High assists | Location Attendance | Record |
|---|---|---|---|---|---|---|---|---|
| 74 | April 2 | @ Philadelphia | W 112–90 | Doug Christie (29) | Doug Christie (15) | Damon Stoudamire (15) | CoreStates Center; 13,769 | 27–47 |
| 75 | April 5 | @ Miami | L 84–98 | Damon Stoudamire (25) | Marcus Camby, Clifford Rozier (6) | Damon Stoudamire (7) | Miami Arena; 15,200 | 27–48 |
| 76 | April 8 | Washington | W 100–94 | Damon Stoudamire (29) | Clifford Rozier (10) | Damon Stoudamire (13) | SkyDome; 17,159 | 28–48 |
| 77 | April 10 | Orlando | L 69–105 | Sharone Wright (17) | Popeye Jones (12) | Damon Stoudamire (5) | SkyDome; 20,280 | 28–49 |
| 78 | April 12 | Indiana | L 89–100 | Damon Stoudamire (22) | Popeye Jones, Clifford Rozier (11) | Damon Stoudamire (11) | SkyDome; 21,832 | 28–50 |
| 79 | April 14 | @ Chicago | L 100–117 | Damon Stoudamire (29) | Carlos Rogers (12) | Damon Stoudamire (12) | United Center; 23,896 | 28–51 |
| 80 | April 15 | @ Milwaukee | L 85–92 | Reggie Slater (19) | Clifford Rozier (13) | Damon Stoudamire (11) | Bradley Center; 14,652 | 28–52 |
| 81 | April 18 | @ Charlotte | W 108–100 | Damon Stoudamire (28) | Marcus Camby, Popeye Jones (8) | Damon Stoudamire (9) | Charlotte Coliseum; 24,042 | 29–52 |
| 82 | April 20 | @ Boston | W 125–94 | Damon Stoudamire (32) | Popeye Jones (12) | Damon Stoudamire (6) | FleetCenter; 17,820 | 30–52 |

1996–97 season schedule

== Player statistics ==
=== Ragular season ===
| Player | POS | GP | GS | MP | REB | AST | STL | BLK | PTS | MPG | RPG | APG | SPG | BPG | PPG |
|---|---|---|---|---|---|---|---|---|---|---|---|---|---|---|---|
| Damon Stoudamire | PG | 81 | 81 | 3,311 | 330 | 709 | 123 | 13 | 1,634 | 40.9 | 4.1 | 8.8 | 1.5 | .2 | 20.2 |
| Doug Christie | SG | 81 | 81 | 3,127 | 432 | 315 | 201 | 45 | 1,176 | 38.6 | 5.3 | 3.9 | 2.5 | .6 | 14.5 |
| Popeye Jones | PF | 79 | 61 | 2,421 | 680 | 84 | 58 | 39 | 616 | 30.6 | 8.6 | 1.1 | .7 | .5 | 7.8 |
| Walt Williams | SF | 73 | 73 | 2,647 | 367 | 197 | 97 | 62 | 1,199 | 36.3 | 5.0 | 2.7 | 1.3 | .8 | 16.4 |
| Marcus Camby | C | 63 | 38 | 1,897 | 394 | 97 | 66 | 130 | 935 | 30.1 | 6.3 | 1.5 | 1.0 | 2.1 | 14.8 |
| Sharone Wright | C | 60 | 28 | 1,009 | 186 | 28 | 15 | 50 | 390 | 16.8 | 3.1 | .5 | .3 | .8 | 6.5 |
| Carlos Rogers | PF | 56 | 3 | 1,397 | 304 | 37 | 42 | 69 | 551 | 24.9 | 5.4 | .7 | .8 | 1.2 | 9.8 |
| Clifford Rozier^{†} | C | 41 | 29 | 732 | 234 | 31 | 24 | 44 | 189 | 17.9 | 5.7 | .8 | .6 | 1.1 | 4.6 |
| Acie Earl^{†} | C | 38 | 0 | 457 | 85 | 18 | 12 | 27 | 162 | 12.0 | 2.2 | .5 | .3 | .7 | 4.3 |
| Hubert Davis | SG | 36 | 0 | 623 | 40 | 34 | 11 | 2 | 181 | 17.3 | 1.1 | .9 | .3 | .1 | 5.0 |
| John Long | SG | 32 | 0 | 370 | 40 | 21 | 9 | 2 | 129 | 11.6 | 1.3 | .7 | .3 | .1 | 4.0 |
| Donald Whiteside | PG | 27 | 1 | 259 | 12 | 36 | 11 | 0 | 59 | 9.6 | .4 | 1.3 | .4 | .0 | 2.2 |
| Shawn Respert^{†} | SG | 27 | 0 | 412 | 32 | 32 | 20 | 2 | 152 | 15.3 | 1.2 | 1.2 | .7 | .1 | 5.6 |
| Reggie Slater | PF | 26 | 0 | 406 | 95 | 21 | 9 | 6 | 203 | 15.6 | 3.7 | .8 | .3 | .2 | 7.8 |
| Oliver Miller^{†} | C | 19 | 8 | 316 | 73 | 29 | 13 | 13 | 114 | 16.6 | 3.8 | 1.5 | .7 | .7 | 6.0 |
| Žan Tabak | C | 13 | 4 | 218 | 49 | 14 | 6 | 11 | 84 | 16.8 | 3.8 | 1.1 | .5 | .8 | 6.5 |
| Martin Lewis | SF | 9 | 0 | 50 | 6 | 4 | 1 | 2 | 14 | 5.6 | .7 | .4 | .1 | .2 | 1.6 |
| Earl Cureton | PF | 9 | 0 | 46 | 9 | 4 | 0 | 0 | 7 | 5.1 | 1.0 | .4 | .0 | .0 | .8 |
| Brad Lohaus | PF | 6 | 0 | 45 | 7 | 1 | 1 | 0 | 10 | 7.5 | 1.2 | .2 | .2 | .0 | 1.7 |
| Benoit Benjamin | C | 4 | 3 | 44 | 9 | 1 | 1 | 0 | 13 | 11.0 | 2.3 | .3 | .3 | .0 | 3.3 |
| Jimmy Oliver | SG | 4 | 0 | 43 | 5 | 1 | 2 | 0 | 11 | 10.8 | 1.3 | .3 | .5 | .0 | 2.8 |

- ^{†} Denotes player spent time with another team in the season. Stats reflect time with the Raptors only.

== Award winners ==
- Marcus Camby, First Team, NBA All-Rookie Team
