= Lorenzo Williams (basketball, born 1969) =

American basketball player

Personal information
- Born: July 15, 1969 (age 57) Ocala, Florida, U.S.
- Listed height: 6 ft 9 in (2.06 m)
- Listed weight: 200 lb (91 kg)

Career information
- High school: Forest (Ocala, Florida)
- College: Polk State (1987–1989); Stetson (1989–1991)
- NBA draft: 1991: undrafted
- Playing career: 1992–2000
- Position: Power forward / center
- Number: 40, 43, 44

Career history
- 1992: Charlotte Hornets
- 1992: Orlando Magic
- 1993: Boston Celtics
- 1993: Orlando Magic
- 1994: Charlotte Hornets
- 1994–1996: Dallas Mavericks
- 1996–2000: Washington Bullets / Wizards

Career highlights
- Second-team All-TAAC (1991)
- Stats at NBA.com
- Stats at Basketball Reference

Lorenzo Williams (born July 15, 1969) is an American former professional basketball player. He played seven seasons in the National Basketball Association (NBA).

== College career ==
Born in Ocala, Florida, Williams attended Polk Community College and Stetson University, both in Florida, and was known for his shot-blocking ability.

== Professional career ==
In the NBA, Williams, a 6'9" center, played with the Charlotte Hornets (1992, 1994), Orlando Magic (1992), Boston Celtics (1993), Dallas Mavericks (1994–96) and the Washington Bullets/Wizards (1996–2000). During 253 regular season games, he averaged three points and six rebounds per game, shooting less than 38% from the line. Williams was a top shot blocker in the NBA.

Williams also played in the Global Basketball Association (1991–92), the United States Basketball League (1991, 1992) and the Continental Basketball Association (1992–93 and 1993–94).

== Post-retirement ==
After retiring, Williams worked helping youth to develop basketball skills at University of Central Florida's Five Star Basketball Camp, during the summer.

== Personal life ==
Williams has been married to Tracey Williams since July 13, 1996.

== NBA career statistics ==
Legend
GP	Games played	GS	Games started	MPG	Minutes per game
FG%	Field goal percentage	3P%	3-point field goal percentage	FT%	Free throw percentage
RPG	Rebounds per game	APG	Assists per game	SPG	Steals per game
BPG	Blocks per game	PPG	Points per game	**Bold**	Career high

*	Led the league

=== Regular season ===
Year	Team	GP	GS	MPG	FG%	3P%	FT%	RPG	APG	SPG	BPG	PPG
1992–93	Charlotte	2	0	9.0	.333	–	–	4.5	.0	.0	1.0	1.0
1992–93	Orlando	3	0	3.3	.000	–	–	.7	.0	.3	.3	.0
1992–93	Boston	22	7	6.9	.516	–	.286	2.0	.2	.2	.6	1.5
1993–94	Orlando	3	0	6.3	.167	.000	–	1.3	.7	.7	1.0	.7
1993–94	Charlotte	1	0	19.0	.000	.–	–	4.0	.0	**1.0**	**2.0**	.0
1993–94	Dallas	34	11	19.9	.466	–	.429	6.1	.7	.4	1.2	3.2
1994–95	Dallas	**82***	**81**	**29.1**	.477	–	.376	**8.4**	**1.5**	.6	1.8	**4.0**
1995–96	Dallas	65	61	27.8	.407	.000	.343	8.0	1.3	.7	1.9	3.0
1996–97	Washington	19	0	13.9	.645	–	**.714**	3.6	.2	.3	.4	2.4
1997–98	Washington	14	6	7.9	.765	–	.000	1.9	.2	.1	.2	1.9
1999–00	Washington	8	0	9.5	**.778**	–	–	3.1	.1	.4	.8	1.8
Career		253	166	21.9	.469	.000	.377	6.3	1.0	.5	1.4	3.0

=== Playoffs ===
Year	Team	GP	GS	MPG	FG%	3P%	FT%	RPG	APG	SPG	BPG	PPG
1993	Boston	1	0	**3.0**	**1.000**	–	–	**1.0**	.0	.0	.0	**2.0**
1997	Washington	**2**	0	2.5	–	–	–	.0	.0	.0	.0	.0
Career		3	0	2.7	1.000	–	–	.3	.0	.0	.0	.7
