= 1999–2000 Boston Celtics season =

Season of National Basketball Association team the Boston Celtics

- Head coach: Rick Pitino
- General manager: Rick Pitino
- Owner: Paul Gaston
- Arena: Fleet Center

Results
- Record: 35–47 (.427)
- Place: Division: 5th (Atlantic); Conference: 10th (Eastern)
- Playoff finish: Did not qualify
- Stats at Basketball Reference

Local media
- Television: Fox Sports Net New England
- Radio: WEEI

The 1999–2000 Boston Celtics season was the 54th season for the Boston Celtics in the National Basketball Association.

== Season summary ==
=== Off-season ===
During the off-season, the team acquired Danny Fortson, and former Celtics forward Eric Williams from the Denver Nuggets, and signed free agents Calbert Cheaney, and undrafted rookie shooting guard Adrian Griffin.

For the season, the Celtics slightly updated their home and road uniforms; the white home uniforms featured a white version of the team's alternate logo of a cloverleaf on their waistband, while the green road uniforms featured a green cloverleaf. The slightly updated uniforms would remain in use until 2006.

=== Regular season ===
In their third season under head coach Rick Pitino, and with the addition of Williams and Griffin, the Celtics got off to a 10–8 start to the regular season, but then posted a six-game losing streak in December afterwards. The team continued to play below .500 in winning percentage, holding a 21–28 record at the All-Star break. At mid-season, the team traded Fortson to the Toronto Raptors in exchange for Alvin Williams, but the trade was voided due to Williams failing his physical exam; Fortson only played 55 games this season due to a stress fracture in his right foot. The Celtics struggled posting a ten-game losing streak between March and April, but managed to win five of their final six games of the season, finishing in fifth place in the Atlantic Division with a 35–47 record, and missing the NBA playoffs for the fifth consecutive year.

Antoine Walker averaged 20.5 points, 8.0 rebounds, 3.7 assists and 1.4 steals per game, while second-year star Paul Pierce had a stellar season, averaging 19.5 points, 5.4 rebounds and 2.1 steals per game, and Kenny Anderson provided the team with 14.0 points, 5.1 assists and 1.7 steals per game. In addition, Vitaly Potapenko provided with 9.2 points and 6.3 rebounds per game, while Griffin contributed 6.7 points, 5.2 rebounds and 1.6 steals per game. Off the bench, Fortson averaged 7.6 points and 6.7 rebounds per game, while Williams and Dana Barros both contributed 7.2 points per game each, Tony Battie provided with 6.6 points and 5.0 rebounds per game, and Cheaney contributed 4.0 points per game.

During the NBA All-Star weekend at The Arena in Oakland in Oakland, California, Pierce and Griffin were both selected for the NBA Rookie Challenge Game, as Pierce was a member of the Sophomores team, while Griffin was a member of the Rookies team. Pierce scored 18 points, and made 5 out of 11 three-point field-goal attempts, despite the Sophomores losing to the Rookies in overtime, 92–83.

The Celtics finished 15th in the NBA in home-game attendance, with an attendance of 683,608 at the FleetCenter during the regular season.

=== Notable incidents ===
This season also reached a breaking point for the Celtics, after a 96–94 home loss to the Raptors on March 1, 2000, in which All-Star guard Vince Carter hit a three-point shot at the buzzer, which even drew cheers from the Celtics fans at the FleetCenter. Pitino went on a legendary rant in his post-game interview, wherein he blamed fans and the media for being negative towards the Celtics, and demanded them to stop reliving past glories; best remembered by the phrase "walking through that door", as he referred to retired Celtics legends Larry Bird, Kevin McHale and Robert Parish, who all won three NBA championships with the team in the 1980s. This would not leave Celtics fans nor the Boston media any more satiated, and contributed to his eventual downfall.

=== Aftermath ===
Following the season, the Celtics were involved in a four-team trade, as Barros was traded to the Dallas Mavericks, while Fortson was dealt to the Golden State Warriors; however, Barros never played for the Mavericks, as he was traded to the Detroit Pistons two months later. Meanwhile, Cheaney was traded to the Denver Nuggets, and Pervis Ellison signed as a free agent with the Seattle SuperSonics.

== Draft picks ==
Round	Pick	Player	Position	Nationality	College
2	55	Kris Clack	SG/SF	United States	Texas

== Roster ==
1999–2000 Boston Celtics roster
Players

Pos.	No.	Player	Height	Weight	DOB	From
G	7	Kenny Anderson	6 ft 0 in (1.83 m)	168 lb (76 kg)	1970–10–09	Georgia Tech
G	11	Dana Barros	5 ft 11 in (1.80 m)	163 lb (74 kg)	1967–04–13	Boston College
C	4	Tony Battie	6 ft 11 in (2.11 m)	230 lb (104 kg)	1976–02–11	Texas Tech
G/F	40	Calbert Cheaney	6 ft 7 in (2.01 m)	209 lb (95 kg)	1971–07–17	Indiana
F/C	29	Pervis Ellison	6 ft 9 in (2.06 m)	210 lb (95 kg)	1967–04–03	Louisville
F/C	27	Danny Fortson	6 ft 7 in (2.01 m)	260 lb (118 kg)	1976–03–27	Cincinnati
G	44	Adrian Griffin	6 ft 5 in (1.96 m)	217 lb (98 kg)	1974–07–04	Seton Hall
F/C	0	Walter McCarty	6 ft 10 in (2.08 m)	230 lb (104 kg)	1974–02–01	Kentucky
G/F	9	Greg Minor (IN)	6 ft 6 in (1.98 m)	210 lb (95 kg)	1971–09–18	Louisville
G	20	Doug Overton	6 ft 3 in (1.91 m)	190 lb (86 kg)	1969–08–03	La Salle
G/F	34	Paul Pierce	6 ft 7 in (2.01 m)	235 lb (107 kg)	1977–10–13	Kansas
C	52	Vitaly Potapenko	6 ft 10 in (2.08 m)	280 lb (127 kg)	1975–03–21	Wright State
F	8	Antoine Walker	6 ft 8 in (2.03 m)	224 lb (102 kg)	1976–08–12	Kentucky
F	55	Eric Williams	6 ft 8 in (2.03 m)	220 lb (100 kg)	1972–07–17	Providence

Coaches
Head coach
- Rick Pitino
Assistant(s)
- John Carroll
- Lester Conner
- Andy Enfield
- Jim O'Brien

Legend
- (DP) Unsigned draft pick
- (FA) Free agent
- (S) Suspended
- (IN) Inactive
- Injured

Roster
Updated: December 23, 1999

=== Roster Notes ===
- Guard/forward Greg Minor was on the injured reserve list due to a hip injury, and missed the entire regular season.

== Regular season ==
=== Season standings ===
Atlantic Division	W	L	PCT	GB	Home	Road	Div
y-Miami Heat	52	30	.634	–	33–8	19–22	18–6
x-New York Knicks	50	32	.610	2	33–8	17–24	14–10
x-Philadelphia 76ers	49	33	.598	3	29–12	20–21	13–11
Orlando Magic	41	41	.500	11	26–15	15–26	12–13
Boston Celtics	35	47	.427	17	26–15	9–32	12–12
New Jersey Nets	31	51	.378	21	22–19	9–32	9–16
Washington Wizards	29	53	.354	23	17–24	12–29	7–17

#	Eastern Conference				
#	Team	W	L	PCT	GB
1	c-Indiana Pacers	56	26	.683	–
2	y-Miami Heat	52	30	.634	4
3	x-New York Knicks	50	32	.610	6
4	x-Charlotte Hornets	49	33	.598	7
5	x-Philadelphia 76ers	49	33	.598	7
6	x-Toronto Raptors	45	37	.549	11
7	x-Detroit Pistons	42	40	.512	14
8	x-Milwaukee Bucks	42	40	.512	14
9	Orlando Magic	41	41	.500	15
10	Boston Celtics	35	47	.427	21
11	Cleveland Cavaliers	32	50	.390	24
12	New Jersey Nets	31	51	.378	25
13	Washington Wizards	29	53	.354	27
14	Atlanta Hawks	28	54	.341	28
15	Chicago Bulls	17	65	.207	39

== Player statistics ==
Legend
GP	Games played	GS	Games started	MPG	Minutes per game
FG%	Field-goal percentage	3P%	3-point field-goal percentage	FT%	Free-throw percentage
RPG	Rebounds per game	APG	Assists per game	SPG	Steals per game
BPG	Blocks per game	PPG	Points per game

=== Regular season ===
Boston Celtics statistics
Player	GP	GS	MPG	FG%	3P%	FT%	RPG	APG	SPG	BPG	PPG
Kenny Anderson	82	82	31.6	.440	.386	.775	2.7	5.1	1.7	.1	14.0
Dana Barros	72	0	15.8	.451	.410	.868	1.4	1.8	.4	.1	7.2
Tony Battie	82	4	18.4	.477	.125	.675	5.0	.8	.6	.9	6.6
Calbert Cheaney	67	19	19.5	.440	.333	.429	2.1	1.2	.7	.2	4.0
Pervis Ellison	30	5	9.0	.442		.714	2.2	.4	.3	.3	1.8
Danny Fortson	55	5	15.6	.528		.735	6.7	.5	.4	.1	7.6
Adrian Griffin	72	47	26.8	.424	.281	.753	5.2	2.5	1.6	.2	6.7
Walter McCarty	61	5	14.4	.339	.309	.722	1.8	1.1	.4	.4	3.8
Doug Overton	48	0	9.0	.396	.357	.952	.7	1.1	.2	.0	3.2
Paul Pierce	73	72	35.4	.442	.343	.798	5.4	3.0	2.1	.8	19.5
Vitaly Potapenko	79	72	22.7	.499	.000	.681	6.3	1.0	.5	.4	9.2
Jamel Thomas^{†}	3	0	6.3	.500	.000	1.000	.7	.7	.0	.0	3.7
Wayne Turner	3	0	13.7	.167		.333	1.0	1.7	.0	.0	1.3
Antoine Walker	82	82	36.6	.430	.256	.699	8.0	3.7	1.4	.4	20.5
Eric Williams	68	17	20.3	.427	.347	.793	2.3	1.4	.6	.2	7.2

- ^{†} Denotes player spent time with another team in the season. Stats reflect time with the Celtics only.

Player statistics citation:

== See also ==
- Reebok Pro Summer League, a summer league hosted by the Celtics
