= 1996–97 Philadelphia 76ers season =

NBA professional basketball team season

- Head coach: Johnny Davis
- General manager: Brad Greenberg
- Owners: Comcast Spectacor
- Arena: CoreStates Center

Results
- Record: 22–60 (.268)
- Place: Division: 6th (Atlantic); Conference: 14th (Eastern)
- Playoff finish: Did not qualify
- Stats at Basketball Reference

Local media
- Television: WPSG; SportsChannel Philadelphia; PRISM
- Radio: WIP

The 1996–97 Philadelphia 76ers season was the 48th season for the Philadelphia 76ers in the National Basketball Association, and their 34th season in Philadelphia, Pennsylvania.

== Season summary ==
=== Off-season ===
Before the beginning of the season, the 76ers won the NBA draft lottery, and selected point guard Allen Iverson out of Georgetown University with the first overall pick in the 1996 NBA draft. After two seasons at Georgetown, Iverson quickly established himself as one of the premier point guards in the NBA. During the off-season, the 76ers signed free agents Don MacLean, Mark Davis, Lucious Harris, and Michael Cage, and hired Johnny Davis as their new head coach. The team also moved into the new 20,000 plus seat CoreStates Center, after calling The Spectrum home from 1967 to 1996.

=== Regular season ===
Under Davis and with the addition of Iverson, the 76ers played around .500 in winning percentage with a 7–8 start to the regular season. However, the team struggled and lost 23 of their next 24 games, including 10 and 13-game losing streaks posted respectively, and held a 12–34 record at the All-Star break. The 76ers lost ten of their final eleven games of the season, and finished in sixth place in the Atlantic Division with a 22–60 record; the team missed the NBA playoffs for the sixth consecutive year.

Iverson had a successful rookie season, scoring 30 points in his NBA debut in the 76ers' 111–103 home loss to the Milwaukee Bucks, at the CoreStates Center on November 1, 1996, and finishing the regular season averaging 23.5 points, 7.5 assists and 2.1 steals per game, and also leading the team with 155 three-point field goals; he was named the NBA Rookie of the Year, and was named to the NBA All-Rookie First Team. In addition, second-year star Jerry Stackhouse finished second on the team in scoring with 20.7 points per game, and 102 three-point field goals, while Derrick Coleman averaged 18.1 points, 10.1 rebounds and 1.3 blocks per game, but only played 57 games due to a finger injury, and Clarence Weatherspoon provided the team with 12.2 points and 8.3 rebounds per game. Off the bench, MacLean contributed 10.9 points per game, but only played just 37 games due to a hip injury, while Davis provided with 8.5 points and 4.3 rebounds per game, Rex Walters contributed 6.8 points per game, starting center Scott Williams averaged 5.8 points and 6.4 rebounds per game, Harris contributed 5.4 points per game, and Cage provided with 1.8 points and 3.9 rebounds per game.

During the NBA All-Star weekend at the Gund Arena in Cleveland, Ohio, Iverson was selected for the NBA Rookie Game, as a member of the Eastern Conference Rookie team. Iverson scored 19 points along with 9 assists, 3 steals and 3 blocks, and was named the Rookie Game's Most Valuable Player, as the Eastern Conference defeated the Western Conference, 96–91. In addition, Iverson was also selected to participate in the NBA Slam Dunk Contest, but withdrew due to injury, and was replaced with Darvin Ham of the Denver Nuggets. Iverson finished tied in 17th place in Most Valuable Player voting, while Davis finished tied in seventh place in Sixth Man of the Year voting.

The 76ers finished 26th in the NBA in home-game attendance, with an attendance of 610,974 at the CoreStates Center during the regular season, which was the fourth-lowest in the league.

=== Notable highlights ===
Iverson also set a rookie record of scoring 40 or more points in five consecutive games in April, plus scoring a season-high of 50 points in a road game against the Cleveland Cavaliers, at the Gund Arena on April 12, 1997, despite the 76ers losing all five of those games.

=== Aftermath ===
Following the season, Davis and General Manager Brad Greenberg were both fired, and MacLean, Harris and Cage were all traded to the New Jersey Nets.

== Offseason ==
=== NBA draft ===
Round	Pick	Player	Position	Nationality	School/Club team
1	1	Allen Iverson	PG/SG	United States	Georgetown
2	31	Mark Hendrickson	SF	United States	Washington State
2	32	Ryan Minor (from Toronto)	SG	United States	Oklahoma
2	48	Jamie Feick (from Detroit)	PF	United States	Michigan State

== Roster ==
1996–97 Philadelphia 76ers roster
Players

Pos.	No.	Player	Height	Weight	DOB	From
C	50	Mark Bradtke	6 ft 10 in (2.08 m)	265 lb (120 kg)	––	Australia
C	4	Michael Cage	6 ft 9 in (2.06 m)	224 lb (102 kg)	––	San Diego State
F	45	Adrian Caldwell	6 ft 8 in (2.03 m)	265 lb (120 kg)	––	Lamar
F	44	Derrick Coleman	6 ft 10 in (2.08 m)	230 lb (104 kg)	––	Syracuse
F	7	Mark Davis	6 ft 7 in (2.01 m)	210 lb (95 kg)	––	Texas Tech
G	30	Lucious Harris (injured)	6 ft 5 in (1.96 m)	190 lb (86 kg)	––	Long Beach State
F	14	Mark Hendrickson	6 ft 9 in (2.06 m)	220 lb (100 kg)	––	Washington State
G	3	Allen Iverson	6 ft 0 in (1.83 m)	165 lb (75 kg)	––	Georgetown
G	20	Frankie King	6 ft 1 in (1.85 m)	185 lb (84 kg)	––	Western Carolina
F	25	Don MacLean (injured)	6 ft 10 in (2.08 m)	235 lb (107 kg)	––	UCLA
G	9	Doug Overton	6 ft 3 in (1.91 m)	190 lb (86 kg)	––	La Salle
G	42	Jerry Stackhouse	6 ft 6 in (1.98 m)	218 lb (99 kg)	––	North Carolina
G	23	Rex Walters (injured)	6 ft 4 in (1.93 m)	190 lb (86 kg)	––	Kansas
F	35	Clarence Weatherspoon	6 ft 6 in (1.98 m)	240 lb (109 kg)	––	Southern Miss
C	55	Scott Williams	6 ft 10 in (2.08 m)	230 lb (104 kg)	––	North Carolina

Coaches
Head coach
- Johnny Davis
Assistant(s)
- Ed Badger
- Maurice Cheeks
- Bob Ociepka

Legend
- (DP) Unsigned draft pick
- (FA) Free agent
- (S) Suspended
- Injured

Roster

== Regular season ==
=== Season standings ===
Atlantic Division	W	L	PCT	GB	Home	Road	Div
y-Miami Heat	61	21	.744	–	29–12	32–9	16–8
x-New York Knicks	57	25	.695	4	31–10	26–15	19–6
x-Orlando Magic	45	37	.549	16	26–15	19–22	13–11
x-Washington Bullets	44	38	.537	17	25–16	19–22	14–10
New Jersey Nets	26	56	.317	35	16–25	10–31	11–13
Philadelphia 76ers	22	60	.268	39	11–30	11–30	11–14
Boston Celtics	15	67	.183	46	11–30	4–37	1–23

1996–97 NBA East standings
#	Eastern Conference				
#	Team	W	L	PCT	GB
1	z-Chicago Bulls	69	13	.841	–
2	y-Miami Heat	61	21	.744	8
3	x-New York Knicks	57	25	.695	12
4	x-Atlanta Hawks	56	26	.683	13
5	x-Detroit Pistons	54	28	.659	15
6	x-Charlotte Hornets	54	28	.659	15
7	x-Orlando Magic	45	37	.549	24
8	x-Washington Bullets	44	38	.537	25
9	Cleveland Cavaliers	42	40	.512	27
10	Indiana Pacers	39	43	.476	30
11	Milwaukee Bucks	33	49	.402	36
12	Toronto Raptors	30	52	.366	39
13	New Jersey Nets	26	56	.317	43
14	Philadelphia 76ers	22	60	.268	47
15	Boston Celtics	15	67	.183	54

=== Season schedule ===
Game	Date	Opponent	Result	76ers points	Opponent points	Record	Streak	OT
1	November 1	Milwaukee	Loss	103	111	0-1	Lost 1	
2	November 2	@ Chicago	Loss	86	115	0-2	Lost 2	
3	November 5	Detroit	Loss	81	83	0-3	Lost 3	
4	November 8	@ Boston	Win	115	105	1-3	Won 1	
5	November 9	Phoenix	Win	112	95	2-3	Won 2	
6	November 12	@ New York	Win	101	97	3-3	Won 3	
7	November 13	@ Toronto	Loss	98	110	3-4	Lost 1	
8	November 15	Cleveland	Loss	89	105	3-5	Lost 2	
9	November 16	@ Miami	Win	91	89	4-5	Won 1	
10	November 20	Indiana	Loss	92	103	4-6	Lost 1	
11	November 22	@ Washington	Loss	76	88	4-7	Lost 2	
12	November 23	New York	Win	109	92	5-7	Won 1	
13	November 26	LA Lakers	Loss	88	100	5-8	Lost 1	
14	November 29	Orlando	Win	100	91	6-8	Won 1	
15	November 30	Vancouver	Win	96	90	7-8	Won 2	
16	December 4	@ San Antonio	Loss	103	113	7-9	Lost 1	
17	December 5	@ Dallas	Loss	102	106	7-10	Lost 2	
18	December 7	@ Houston	Loss	108	123	7-11	Lost 3	
19	December 9	Seattle	Loss	94	118	7-12	Lost 4	
20	December 11	Miami	Loss	79	84	7-13	Lost 5	
21	December 13	@ Charlotte	Loss	75	84	7-14	Lost 6	
22	December 14	@ Atlanta	Loss	81	106	7-15	Lost 7	
23	December 17	Charlotte	Loss	84	93	7-16	Lost 8	
24	December 20	New York	Loss	103	110	7-17	Lost 9	
25	December 21	Chicago	Loss	105	111	7-18	Lost 10	
26	December 26	@ Denver	Win	118	89	8-18	Won 1	
27	December 28	@ Utah	Loss	84	110	8-19	Lost 1	
28	December 29	@ LA Lakers	Loss	102	115	8-20	Lost 2	
29	January 2	@ Seattle	Loss	82	96	8-21	Lost 3	
30	January 3	@ Golden State	Loss	114	122	8-22	Lost 4	OT
31	January 5	@ Sacramento	Loss	106	107	8-23	Lost 5	
32	January 7	@ Orlando	Loss	88	109	8-24	Lost 6	
33	January 8	Dallas	Loss	93	111	8-25	Lost 7	
34	January 10	Houston	Loss	99	120	8-26	Lost 8	
35	January 13	Utah	Loss	96	97	8-27	Lost 9	OT
36	January 15	Golden State	Loss	111	128	8-28	Lost 10	
37	January 17	New Jersey	Loss	103	105	8-29	Lost 11	OT
38	January 19	@ Indiana	Loss	107	111	8-30	Lost 12	
39	January 20	Milwaukee	Loss	104	114	8-31	Lost 13	
40	January 22	@ Boston	Win	127	125	9-31	Won 1	OT
41	January 24	Sacramento	Loss	92	107	9-32	Lost 1	
42	January 25	@ Detroit	Loss	95	104	9-33	Lost 2	
43	January 29	Toronto	Win	101	99	10-33	Won 1	
44	January 31	Orlando	Loss	99	109	10-34	Lost 1	
45	February 1	@ Milwaukee	Win	109	100	11-34	Won 1	
46	February 5	San Antonio	Win	113	97	12-34	Won 2	
47	February 11	@ Cleveland	Loss	94	105	12-35	Lost 1	
48	February 13	@ New York	Loss	92	107	12-36	Lost 2	
49	February 15	@ Miami	Loss	99	125	12-37	Lost 3	
50	February 16	Denver	Loss	97	112	12-38	Lost 4	
51	February 18	Miami	Loss	83	111	12-39	Lost 5	
52	February 20	LA Clippers	Win	101	84	13-39	Won 1	
53	February 22	Portland	Win	97	80	14-39	Won 2	
54	February 25	@ LA Clippers	Loss	93	98	14-40	Lost 1	
55	February 26	@ Phoenix	Loss	104	111	14-41	Lost 2	
56	February 28	@ Vancouver	Win	104	100	15-41	Won 1	
57	March 2	@ Portland	Loss	95	112	15-42	Lost 1	
58	March 4	Washington	Loss	106	107	15-43	Lost 2	
59	March 6	Atlanta	Loss	104	117	15-44	Lost 3	
60	March 9	@ Washington	Win	99	93	16-44	Won 1	
61	March 11	@ Minnesota	Loss	100	104	16-45	Lost 1	
62	March 12	Chicago	Loss	104	108	16-46	Lost 2	
63	March 14	Minnesota	Win	109	95	17-46	Won 1	
64	March 15	Charlotte	Loss	99	107	17-47	Lost 1	
65	March 18	@ Toronto	Loss	105	117	17-48	Lost 2	
66	March 19	New York	Loss	100	111	17-49	Lost 3	
67	March 21	New Jersey	Win	112	110	18-49	Won 1	
68	March 26	@ New Jersey	Loss	105	123	18-50	Lost 1	
69	March 28	Boston	Win	113	105	19-50	Won 1	
70	March 30	@ Detroit	Win	96	92	20-50	Won 2	
71	April 1	@ Orlando	Win	105	93	21-50	Won 3	
72	April 2	Toronto	Loss	90	112	21-51	Lost 1	
73	April 4	Indiana	Loss	103	114	21-52	Lost 2	
74	April 5	@ Charlotte	Loss	113	115	21-53	Lost 3	
75	April 7	@ Chicago	Loss	102	128	21-54	Lost 4	
76	April 9	Atlanta	Loss	101	116	21-55	Lost 5	
77	April 11	@ Milwaukee	Loss	118	126	21-56	Lost 6	
78	April 12	@ Cleveland	Loss	118	125	21-57	Lost 7	
79	April 14	Washington	Loss	110	131	21-58	Lost 8	
80	April 16	@ New Jersey	Win	113	105	22-58	Won 1	
81	April 18	Boston	Loss	113	119	22-59	Lost 1	
82	April 19	@ Atlanta	Loss	104	136	22-60	Lost 2	

== Player statistics ==
Legend
GP	Games played	GS	Games started	MPG	Minutes per game
FG%	Field-goal percentage	3P%	3-point field-goal percentage	FT%	Free-throw percentage
RPG	Rebounds per game	APG	Assists per game	SPG	Steals per game
BPG	Blocks per game	PPG	Points per game

Player	GP	GS	MPG	FG%	3P%	FT%	RPG	APG	SPG	BPG	PPG
Allen Iverson	76	74	40.1	.416	.341	.702	4.1	7.5	2.1	0.3	23.5
Jerry Stackhouse	81	81	39.1	.407	.298	.766	4.2	3.1	1.1	0.8	20.7
Derrick Coleman	57	54	36.9	.435	.269	.745	10.1	3.4	0.9	1.3	18.1
Clarence Weatherspoon	82	82	36.0	.491	.167	.738	8.3	1.7	0.9	1.0	12.2
Don McLean	37	2	19.8	.447	.316	.660	3.8	1.0	0.3	0.3	10.9
Mark Davis	75	17	22.7	.469	.258	.673	4.3	1.8	1.1	0.4	8.5
Rex Walters	59	16	17.6	.455	.385	.790	1.8	1.9	0.5	0.1	6.8
Scott Williams	62	52	21.2	.509		.691	6.4	0.7	0.7	0.7	5.8
Lucious Harris	54	3	15.1	.381	.364	.702	1.3	0.9	0.8	0.1	5.4
Doug Overton	61	4	10.4	.462	.250	.938	1.1	1.7	0.4	0.0	3.6
Joe Courtney	4	0	13.0	.429			2.3	0.0	0.0	0.0	3.0
Mark Hendrickson	29	1	10.4	.416	.250	.692	3.2	0.1	0.3	0.1	2.9
Frankie King	7	0	8.4	.412	.500	1.000	2.0	0.7	0.6	0.0	2.9
Adrian Caldwell	27	0	13.5	.526		.364	4.1	0.3	0.3	0.3	2.7
Michael Cage	82	24	15.2	.468		.463	3.9	0.5	0.6	0.5	1.8
Mark Bradtke	36	0	7.0	.431		.692	1.9	0.2	0.1	0.1	1.6

== Award winners ==
- Allen Iverson, NBA Rookie of the Year Award
- Allen Iverson, NBA All-Rookie Team First Team
