= Randell Jackson =

American basketball player (born 1976)

Personal information
- Born: January 6, 1976 (age 50) Boston, Massachusetts, U.S.
- Listed height: 6 ft 11 in (2.11 m)
- Listed weight: 215 lb (98 kg)

Career information
- High school: The Winchendon School (Winchendon, Massachusetts)
- College: Florida State (1995–1998)
- NBA draft: 1998: undrafted
- Playing career: 1998–2008
- Position: Power forward
- Number: 50, 43

Career history
- 1998–1999: Fort Wayne Fury
- 1999: Washington Wizards
- 1999: Dallas Mavericks
- 1999–2000: Fort Wayne Fury
- 2000–2001: Connecticut Pride
- 2001: Hapoel Galil Elyon
- 2001: Trotamundos de Carabobo
- 2001: Titanes de Morovis
- 2001–2002: Panionios B.C.
- 2002: Gallitos de Isabela
- 2002–2003: Bnei Herzliya
- 2003: Trotamundos de Carabobo
- 2004–2005: Maccabi Givat Shmuel
- 2005: Cocodrilos de Caracas
- 2005–2006: Xinjiang Flying Tigers
- 2006: Panteras de Aguascalientes
- 2006–2007: Central E. Gualeguaychu
- 2007: Unión de Santa Fe
- 2007–2008: Panteras de Aguascalientes
- 2008: Alba Fehérvár

Career highlights
- McDonald's All-American (1995); Second-team Parade All-American (1995)
- Stats at NBA.com
- Stats at Basketball Reference

Randell Edward Jackson (born January 6, 1976) is an American former professional basketball player who played briefly in the National Basketball Association (NBA), among other leagues.
