= Terry Davis (basketball) =

American basketball player (born 1967)

Personal information
- Born: June 17, 1967 (age 59) Danville, Virginia, U.S.
- Listed height: 6 ft 9 in (2.06 m)
- Listed weight: 225 lb (102 kg)

Career information
- High school: Halifax County (South Boston, Virginia)
- College: Virginia Union (1985–1989)
- NBA draft: 1989: undrafted
- Playing career: 1989–2001
- Position: Power forward / center
- Number: 44, 43, 52

Career history
- 1989–1991: Miami Heat
- 1991–1996: Dallas Mavericks
- 1997–1999: Washington Wizards
- 2000–2001: Denver Nuggets
- Stats at NBA.com
- Stats at Basketball Reference

Terry Raymond Davis (born June 17, 1967) is an American former professional basketball player who was a power forward and center for the Miami Heat, Dallas Mavericks, Washington Wizards, and Denver Nuggets of the National Basketball Association (NBA). He played college basketball for the Virginia Union Panthers.

== Career ==
=== Virginia Union University ===
In college, Davis played for four seasons (from 1985 to 1989), in three of them as a starter, and averaged 22.3 points per game and 11.9 rebounds per game in his senior season.

=== Miami Heat ===
As a rookie (not drafted, started his NBA career as free agent) during the 1989–90 NBA season, Davis played in 63 games for the Heat—a team in its second season of existence in the NBA. In 1990–91, Davis played in fewer games (55) but had a higher scoring and rebounding average than he did in the previous season.

=== Dallas Mavericks ===
On August 6, 1991, Davis signed with the Mavericks and in his first season with the team, he ranked 15th among all NBA players that season when he grabbed 9.9 rebounds per game.

After another good season with the Mavericks in 1992–93, his next three seasons with the team were plagued with injuries and his production slipped heavily.

=== Washington Wizards ===
After a year away from the NBA, Davis resurfaced with the Washington Wizards in the 1997–98 season. It was with the Wizards that he gained the distinction of being the first player to score a basket at Washington, D.C.'s MCI Center.

=== Denver Nuggets ===
After two continuous seasons with the Wizards, and another full season out of the NBA, Davis signed with the Nuggets for the 2000–01 season and played in just 21 games.

== Personal life ==
Terry's son, Ed, was ranked second in the class of 2008 by at least one recruiting service and played college basketball at the University of North Carolina as a sophomore and was drafted 13th overall in the 2010 NBA draft by the Toronto Raptors.
