= 1996–97 Dallas Mavericks season =

NBA professional basketball team season

- Head coach: Jim Cleamons
- General manager: Frank Zaccanelli (through February 7, 1997); Don Nelson (after February 7, 1997)
- Owner: Ross Perot Jr.
- Arena: Reunion Arena

Results
- Record: 24–58 (.293)
- Place: Division: 4th (Midwest); Conference: 11th (Western)
- Playoff finish: Did not qualify
- Stats at Basketball Reference

Local media
- Television: KXTX-TV; Fox Sports Southwest
- Radio: WBAP

The 1996–97 Dallas Mavericks season was the 17th season for the Dallas Mavericks in the National Basketball Association.

== Season summary ==
=== Off-season ===
The Mavericks received the ninth overall pick in the 1996 NBA draft, and selected power forward Samaki Walker from the University of Louisville. During the off-season, the team signed free agents Chris Gatling, Oliver Miller, and former Mavericks guard Derek Harper, acquired Eric Montross from the Boston Celtics, and signed undrafted rookie point guard Erick Strickland. The team also hired Jim Cleamons as their new head coach.

=== Regular season ===
Under Cleamons and with the addition of Gatling, Harper, Montross, Miller and Walker, the Mavericks continued to struggle losing 10 of their first 14 games of the regular season in November. In late December, the team traded All-Star guard Jason Kidd, Tony Dumas, and second-year center Loren Meyer to the Phoenix Suns in exchange for second-year star Michael Finley, Sam Cassell and A.C. Green. The Mavericks lost 11 of their 15 games in January, and later on held a 16–28 record at the All-Star break. Gatling played a sixth man role off the bench, averaging 19.1 points and 7.9 rebounds per game during the first half of the season.

At mid-season, the Mavericks traded Gatling, Cassell, Montross, Jim Jackson and George McCloud to the New Jersey Nets in exchange for Shawn Bradley, Robert Pack, Khalid Reeves and second-year forward Ed O'Bannon; the team also traded Jamal Mashburn to the Miami Heat in exchange for second-year guard Sasha Danilović, second-year forward Kurt Thomas, and rookie power forward Martin Müürsepp, while Miller was released to free agency, and re-signed as a free agent with his former team, the Toronto Raptors. In February, former Milwaukee Bucks and Golden State Warriors head coach Don Nelson became the team's General Manager. The Mavericks posted a seven-game losing streak between February and March, then suffered an 11-game losing streak between March and April, and lost 16 of their final 18 games of the season. The Mavericks finished in fourth place in the Midwest Division with a 24–58 record, and missed the NBA playoffs for the seventh consecutive year.

Finley averaged 16.0 points and 4.5 rebounds per game in 56 games after the trade, while Danilović contributed 16.6 points per game in 13 games, and Bradley averaged 14.6 points, 8.7 rebounds and 2.7 blocks per game in 32 games. In addition, Pack provided the team with 11.5 points, 6.4 assists and 1.8 steals per game in 20 games, while Strickland contributed 10.6 points per game in 28 games, Harper provided with 10.0 points and 4.3 assists per game, and Green averaged 7.9 points and 9.1 rebounds per game in 56 games. Meanwhile, Reeves contributed 7.8 points and 4.3 assists per game in 13 games, and Walker provided with 5.0 points and 3.4 rebounds per game in 43 games.

During the NBA All-Star weekend at the Gund Arena in Cleveland, Ohio, and before the mid-season trade, Gatling was selected for the 1997 NBA All-Star Game, as a member of the Western Conference All-Star team; it was his first and only All-Star appearance. Meanwhile, Finley participated in the NBA Slam Dunk Contest for the second consecutive year, and Walker was selected for the NBA Rookie Game, as a member of the Western Conference Rookie team, but did not participate due to a knee injury.

The Mavericks finished 24th in the NBA in home-game attendance, with an attendance of 619,178 at the Reunion Arena during the regular season.

=== Notable highlights ===
One notable game of the regular season occurred on April 6, 1997, in a road game against the Los Angeles Lakers at the Great Western Forum. After leading 51–37 at halftime, the Mavericks struggled only scoring just two points in the third quarter, as the Lakers outscored them 23–2 in that quarter; the Mavericks lost to the Lakers by a score of 87–80. The Mavericks' two points were the fewest points scored in a quarter of a game in NBA history.

=== Aftermath ===
Following the season, Harper and O'Bannon were both traded to the Orlando Magic, who released O'Bannon to free agency, and Danilović was released after only two seasons in the NBA.

== Offseason ==
=== Draft picks ===
Round	Pick	Player	Position	Nationality	College
1	9	Samaki Walker	PF	United States	Louisville
2	34	Shawn Harvey	G	United States	West Virginia State University
2	56	Darnell Robinson	F	United States	Arkansas

== Roster ==
1996–97 Dallas Mavericks roster
Players

Pos.	No.	Player	Height	Weight	DOB	From
C	44	Shawn Bradley	7 ft 6 in (2.29 m)	235 lb (107 kg)	1972–03–22	BYU
G	5	Sasha Danilovic	6 ft 5 in (1.96 m)	200 lb (91 kg)	1970–02–26	Serbia
C	50	Greg Dreiling	7 ft 1 in (2.16 m)	250 lb (113 kg)	1962–11–07	Kansas
F	4	Michael Finley	6 ft 7 in (2.01 m)	215 lb (98 kg)	1973–03–06	Wisconsin
F	45	A.C. Green	6 ft 9 in (2.06 m)	220 lb (100 kg)	1963–10–04	Oregon State
G	12	Derek Harper	6 ft 4 in (1.93 m)	185 lb (84 kg)	1961–10–13	Illinois
C	33	Stacey King	6 ft 11 in (2.11 m)	230 lb (104 kg)	1967–01–29	Oklahoma
F	13	Martin Müürsepp	6 ft 9 in (2.06 m)	235 lb (107 kg)	1974–09–26	Estonia
F	31	Ed O'Bannon	6 ft 8 in (2.03 m)	222 lb (101 kg)	1972–08–14	UCLA
G	14	Robert Pack	6 ft 2 in (1.88 m)	180 lb (82 kg)	1969–02–03	USC
G	6	Khalid Reeves	6 ft 3 in (1.91 m)	199 lb (90 kg)	1972–07–15	Arizona
G	20	Erick Strickland	6 ft 3 in (1.91 m)	210 lb (95 kg)	1973–11–25	Nebraska
F/C	40	Kurt Thomas (injured) (IN)	6 ft 9 in (2.06 m)	230 lb (104 kg)	1972–10–04	TCU
F	52	Samaki Walker (injured)	6 ft 9 in (2.06 m)	240 lb (109 kg)	1976–02–25	Louisville

Coaches
Head coach
- Jim Cleamons
Assistant(s)
- Butch Beard
- Jack Nolan
- Charlie Parker
- Bob Salmi
- Lanny Van Eman

Legend
- (DP) Unsigned draft pick
- (FA) Free agent
- (S) Suspended
- (IN) Inactive
- Injured

Roster
Updated: April 15, 1997

=== Roster Notes ===
- Center Shawn Bradley holds both American and German citizenship.
- Power forward Kurt Thomas was acquired by the Mavericks from the Miami Heat in a mid-season trade, but was placed on the injured reserve list due to an ankle injury he sustained with the Heat, and did not play with the Mavericks this season.

== Regular season ==
=== Season standings ===
Midwest Division	W	L	PCT	GB	Home	Road	Div
y-Utah Jazz	64	18	.780	–	38–3	26–15	19–5
x-Houston Rockets	57	25	.695	7	30–11	27–14	19–5
x-Minnesota Timberwolves	40	42	.488	24	25–16	15–26	16–8
Dallas Mavericks	24	58	.293	40	14–27	10–31	9–15
Denver Nuggets	21	61	.256	43	12–29	9–32	7–17
San Antonio Spurs	20	62	.244	44	12–29	8–33	8–16
Vancouver Grizzlies	14	68	.171	50	8–33	6–35	6–18

1996–97 NBA West standings
#	Western Conference				
#	Team	W	L	PCT	GB
1	c-Utah Jazz	64	18	.780	–
2	y-Seattle SuperSonics	57	25	.695	7
3	x-Houston Rockets	57	25	.695	7
4	x-Los Angeles Lakers	56	26	.683	8
5	x-Portland Trail Blazers	49	33	.598	15
6	x-Minnesota Timberwolves	40	42	.488	24
7	x-Phoenix Suns	40	42	.488	24
8	x-Los Angeles Clippers	36	46	.439	28
9	Sacramento Kings	34	48	.415	30
10	Golden State Warriors	30	52	.366	34
11	Dallas Mavericks	24	58	.293	40
12	Denver Nuggets	21	61	.256	43
13	San Antonio Spurs	20	62	.244	44
14	Vancouver Grizzlies	14	68	.171	50

z - clinched division title
y - clinched division title
x - clinched playoff spot

=== Game log ===
1996–97 game log
Total: 24–58 (Home: 0–0; Road: 0–0)
November: 4–10 (home: 3–4; road: 1–6)

Game	Date	Team	Score	High points	High rebounds	High assists	Location Attendance	Record
1	November 1	@ Denver	W 92–91	Jim Jackson (28)	Jim Jackson (11)	Jason Kidd (9)	McNichols Sports Arena; 16,104	1–0
2	November 2	Sacramento	L 94–107	Jim Jackson (26)	Jim Jackson (10)	Jason Kidd (9)	Reunion Arena; 18,042	1–1
3	November 5	@ Toronto	L 96–100	Chris Gatling (22)	Chris Gatling (11)	Jason Kidd (5)	SkyDome; 17,065	1–2
4	November 6	@ Detroit	L 84–103	Tony Dumas (15)	George McCloud (8)	Jim Jackson (4)	The Palace of Auburn Hills; 14,473	1–3
5	November 9	Miami	L 84–91	Jamal Mashburn (19)	Chris Gatling (11)	Jason Kidd (8)	Reunion Arena; 15,021	1–4
6	November 12	Indiana	W 103–82	Derek Harper (17)	Oliver Miller (11)	Jason Kidd (11)	Reunion Arena; 14,153	2–4
7	November 14	@ Minnesota	L 90–100	Chris Gatling (26)	Chris Gatling (14)	Jamal Mashburn (8)	Target Center; 14,079	2–5
8	November 16	Utah	L 87–88	Chris Gatling (23)	Chris Gatling (20)	Kidd, Harper (7)	Reunion Arena; 15,947	2–6
9	November 19	@ Milwaukee	L 97–100	Jason Kidd (25)	Jason Kidd (13)	Jason Kidd (8)	Bradley Center; 13,225	2–7
10	November 21	L. A. Clippers	W 105–94	Chris Gatling (27)	Chris Gatling (9)	Jason Kidd (9)	Reunion Arena; 13,510	3–7
11	November 23	@ New Jersey	L 91–114	George McCloud (13)	Loren Meyer (9)	Jason Kidd (12)	Continental Airlines Arena; 15,701	3–8
12	November 24	@ Boston	L 91–105	Jackson, Gatling (23)	Chris Gatling (11)	Jason Kidd (8)	Fleet Center; 15,244	3–9
13	November 26	San Antonio	W 105–101	Chris Gatling (26)	Chris Gatling (6)	Jason Kidd (10)	Reunion Arena; 14,567	4–9
14	November 29	Chicago	L 96–116	Chris Gatling (35)	Chris Gatling (11)	Jason Kidd (17)	Reunion Arena; 18,042	4–10

December: 0–0 (home: 0–0; road: 0–0)

Game	Date	Team	Score	High points	High rebounds	High assists	Location Attendance	Record

January: 0–0 (home: 0–0; road: 0–0)

Game	Date	Team	Score	High points	High rebounds	High assists	Location Attendance	Record

February: 0–0 (home: 0–0; road: 0–0)

Game	Date	Team	Score	High points	High rebounds	High assists	Location Attendance	Record

March: 0–0 (home: 0–0; road: 0–0)

Game	Date	Team	Score	High points	High rebounds	High assists	Location Attendance	Record

April: 2–9 (home: 1–5; road: 1–4)

Game	Date	Team	Score	High points	High rebounds	High assists	Location Attendance	Record
72	April 1	Detroit	L 82–100	Finley, Pack (15)	A. C. Green (10)	Robert Pack (9)	Reunion Arena; 15,291	22–50
73	April 3	@ Golden State	L 90–106	Derek Harper (19)	A. C. Green (8)	Derek Harper (7)	San Jose Arena; 13,669	22–51
74	April 5	@ Seattle	L 84–103	Sasha Danilović (18)	Shawn Bradley (10)	Derek Harper (4)	KeyArena at Seattle Center; 17,072	22–52
75	April 6	@ L. A. Lakers	L 80–87	Derek Harper (18)	A. C. Green (14)	Robert Pack (10)	Great Western Forum; 17,364	22–53
76	April 8	Portland	W 87–82	Sasha Danilović (22)	Robert Pack (9)	A. C. Green (14)	Reunion Arena; 13,590	23–53
77	April 10	Seattle	L 82–90	Michael Finley (25)	Shawn Bradley (8)	Robert Pack (5)	Reunion Arena; 13,687	23–54
78	April 12	Vancouver	L 85–96	Robert Pack (22)	Shawn Bradley (13)	Robert Pack (6)	Reunion Arena; 14,060	23–55
79	April 14	L. A. Clippers	L 93–99	Shawn Bradley (32)	Shawn Bradley (16)	Michael Finley (6)	Reunion Arena; 15,461	23–56
80	April 16	@ Minnesota	W 92–77	Michael Finley (19)	A. C. Green (14)	Michael Finley (4)	Target Center; 16,444	24–56
81	April 18	@ Houston	L 102–112	Sasha Danilović (23)	A. C. Green (13)	Robert Pack (12)	The Summit; 16,285	24–57
82	April 19	Denver	L 95–100	Shawn Bradley (25)	Robert Pack (9)	Shawn Bradley (16)	Reunion Arena; 16,183	24–58

1996–97 schedule

== Player statistics ==
=== Regular season ===
Player	POS	GP	GS	MP	REB	AST	STL	BLK	PTS	MPG	RPG	APG	SPG	BPG	PPG
Derek Harper	PG	75	29	2,210	137	321	92	12	753	29.5	1.8	4.3	1.2	.2	10.0
A. C. Green^{†}	PF	56	54	1,944	518	52	52	15	444	34.7	9.3	.9	.9	.3	7.9
Michael Finley^{†}	SF	56	36	1,994	252	156	50	20	897	35.6	4.5	2.8	.9	.4	16.0
Eric Montross^{†}	C	47	46	984	236	32	9	34	182	20.9	5.0	.7	.2	.7	3.9
Jim Jackson^{†}	SG	46	46	1,676	227	156	57	15	714	36.4	4.9	3.4	1.2	.3	15.5
Chris Gatling^{†}	PF	44	1	1,191	348	25	35	31	840	27.1	7.9	.6	.8	.7	19.1
Samaki Walker	PF	43	12	602	147	17	15	22	214	14.0	3.4	.4	.3	.5	5.0
Oliver Miller^{†}	C	42	0	836	233	58	34	50	180	19.9	5.5	1.4	.8	1.2	4.3
George McCloud^{†}	SF	41	26	1,207	143	92	52	8	563	29.4	3.5	2.2	1.3	.2	13.7
Greg Dreiling	C	40	3	389	76	11	8	7	80	9.7	1.9	.3	.2	.2	2.0
Jamal Mashburn^{†}	SF	37	21	975	115	93	35	5	394	26.4	3.1	2.5	.9	.1	10.6
Shawn Bradley^{†}	C	33	32	1,060	286	32	17	88	482	32.1	8.7	1.0	.5	2.7	14.6
Martin Müürsepp^{†}	PF	32	0	321	62	17	12	10	139	10.0	1.9	.5	.4	.3	4.3
Erick Strickland	SG	28	15	759	90	68	27	5	297	27.1	3.2	2.4	1.0	.2	10.6
Jason Kidd^{†}	PG	22	22	791	90	200	45	8	217	36.0	4.1	9.1	2.0	.4	9.9
Robert Pack^{†}	PG	20	11	597	60	127	35	3	229	29.9	3.0	6.4	1.8	.2	11.5
Loren Meyer^{†}	PF	19	16	259	49	7	6	3	78	13.6	2.6	.4	.3	.2	4.1
Ed O'Bannon^{†}	SF	19	0	175	36	11	5	2	46	9.2	1.9	.6	.3	.1	2.4
Tony Dumas^{†}	SG	18	0	227	14	22	10	1	72	12.6	.8	1.2	.6	.1	4.0
Sam Cassell^{†}	PG	16	13	398	50	57	17	6	197	24.9	3.1	3.6	1.1	.4	12.3
Khalid Reeves^{†}	PG	13	12	384	31	56	11	2	102	29.5	2.4	4.3	.8	.2	7.8
Predrag Danilović^{†}	SG	13	9	438	34	25	15	1	216	33.7	2.6	1.9	1.2	.1	16.6
Fred Roberts	PF	12	0	40	10	0	0	1	22	3.3	.8	.0	.0	.1	1.8
Jamie Watson^{†}	SF	10	6	211	29	23	11	2	45	21.1	2.9	2.3	1.1	.2	4.5
Stevin Smith	SG	8	0	60	10	4	1	0	14	7.5	1.3	.5	.1	.0	1.8
Stacey King^{†}	C	6	0	70	18	0	2	0	12	11.7	3.0	.0	.3	.0	2.0
Jason Sasser^{†}	SF	2	0	7	1	1	1	0	2	3.5	.5	.5	.5	.0	1.0

- ^{†} Denotes player spent time with another team in the season. Stats reflect time with the Mavericks only.

== Transactions ==
=== Trades ===
June 21, 1996
To Dallas Mavericks----
- Eric Montross
- 1996 1st round draft pick
To Boston Celtics----
- 1996 1st round draft pick
- 1997 1st round draft pick
July 23, 1996
To Dallas Mavericks----
- Jimmy King
- 1998 2nd round draft pick
To Toronto Raptors----
- Popeye Jones
December 26, 1996
To Dallas Mavericks----
- Sam Cassell
- Michael Finley
- A. C. Green
- 1998 2nd round draft pick
To Phoenix Suns----
- Tony Dumas
- Jason Kidd
- Loren Meyer
February 14, 1997
To Dallas Mavericks----
- Sasha Danilović
- Martin Müürsepp
- Kurt Thomas
To Miami Heat----
- Jamal Mashburn
February 17, 1997
To Dallas Mavericks----
- Shawn Bradley
- Ed O'Bannon
- Robert Pack
- Khalid Reeves
To New Jersey Nets----
- Sam Cassell
- Chris Gatling
- Jim Jackson
- George McCloud
- Eric Montross

== See also ==
- 1996-97 NBA season
