= 1996–97 Atlanta Hawks season =

NBA professional basketball team season

- Head coach: Lenny Wilkens
- General manager: Pete Babcock
- Owners: Ted Turner / Turner Broadcasting System
- Arena: Omni Coliseum

Results
- Record: 56–26 (.683)
- Place: Division: 2nd (Central); Conference: 4th (Eastern)
- Playoff finish: Conference Semi-finals (lost to Bulls 1–4)
- Stats at Basketball Reference

Local media
- Television: WATL; Fox Sports South
- Radio: WCNN

The 1996–97 Atlanta Hawks season was the 48th season for the Atlanta Hawks in the National Basketball Association, and their 29th season in Atlanta, Georgia. During this season, Hawks owner Ted Turner was the then-vice chairman of Time Warner after acquiring Turner Broadcasting System.

== Season summary ==
=== Off-season ===
During the off-season, the Hawks signed free agent All-Star center Dikembe Mutombo to help strengthen their defense. The team also signed free agents Tyrone Corbin, Willie Burton, Eldridge Recasner, and former Georgia Tech University guard Jon Barry; Corbin previously played for the Hawks during the 1994–95 season.

=== Regular season ===
With the addition of Mutombo and Corbin, the Hawks struggled with a 5–6 start to the regular season, but soon recovered and played above .500 in winning percentage for the remainder of the season. In December, the team signed free agent, and three-point specialist Henry James, and later on released Burton to free agency in January after 24 games. The Hawks posted a 14–2 record in January, which included a 10-game winning streak, and later on held a 31–15 record at the All-Star break. The Hawks posted a seven-game winning streak in March, and finished in second place in the Central Division with a 56–26 record, earning the fourth seed in the Eastern Conference; the team qualified for the NBA playoffs for the fifth consecutive year. The Hawks also posted a successful 36–5 home record at the Omni Coliseum, which was the third-best in the league, and also won 20 consecutive home games from November 12, 1996 to February 12, 1997. The Hawks had the third best team defensive rating in the NBA.

Steve Smith averaged 20.1 points and 4.2 assists per game, and contributed 130 three-point field goals, while Christian Laettner averaged 18.1 points and 8.8 rebounds per game, and Mookie Blaylock provided the team with 17.4 points, 5.3 rebounds, 5.9 assists and 2.7 steals per game, led the Hawks with 221 three-point field goals, and was named to the NBA All-Defensive Second Team. In addition, Mutombo provided with 13.3 points, 11.6 rebounds and 3.3 blocks per game, and was named the NBA Defensive Player of the Year for the second time, and was also named to the NBA All-Defensive First Team, while Corbin contributed 9.5 points and 1.3 steals per game. Off the bench, James contributed 6.7 points per game in 53 games, while second-year forward Alan Henderson averaged 6.6 points and 3.9 rebounds per game, but only played just 30 games due to a mysterious illness known as "acute viral pancreatitis", Recasner provided with 5.7 points per game, and Barry contributed 4.9 points per game.

During the NBA All-Star weekend at the Gund Arena in Cleveland, Ohio, Mutombo and Laettner were both selected for the 1997 NBA All-Star Game, as members of the Eastern Conference All-Star team; it was Laettner's first and only All-Star appearance. Mutombo also finished tied in 13th place in Most Valuable Player voting, while Smith finished tied in 17th place; Blaylock finished in third place in Defensive Player of the Year voting, and head coach Lenny Wilkens finished tied in sixth place in Coach of the Year voting.

The Hawks finished 27th in the NBA in home-game attendance, with an attendance of 549,414 at the Omni Coliseum during the regular season, which was the third-lowest in the league.

=== NBA playoffs ===
In the Eastern Conference First Round of the 1997 NBA playoffs, the Hawks faced off against the 5th–seeded Detroit Pistons, who were led by All-Star forward Grant Hill, All-Star guard Joe Dumars, and Lindsey Hunter. The Hawks won Game 1 over the Pistons at home, 89–75 at the Omni Coliseum, but then lost the next two games, which included a Game 3 loss to the Pistons on the road, 99–91 at The Palace of Auburn Hills, as the Pistons took a 2–1 series lead. However, the Hawks managed to win the next two games, including a Game 5 win over the Pistons at the Omni Coliseum, 84–79 to win in a hard-fought five-game series.

In the Eastern Conference Semi-finals, the team faced off against the top–seeded, and defending NBA champion Chicago Bulls, who won the Central Division title, and were led by the trio of All-Star guard Michael Jordan, All-Star forward Scottie Pippen, and rebound-specialist Dennis Rodman. The Hawks lost Game 1 to the Bulls on the road, 100–97 at the United Center, but managed to win Game 2 on the road, 103–95 to even the series; in Game 2, Blaylock scored 26 points, and made 8 out of 9 three-point field-goal attempts. However, the Hawks lost their next two home games at the Omni Coliseum, before losing Game 5 to the Bulls at the United Center, 107–92, thus losing the series in five games.

The Bulls would go on to defeat the Utah Jazz in six games in the 1997 NBA Finals, winning their second consecutive NBA championship, and their fifth championship in seven years.

=== Aftermath ===
This was also the Hawks' final season in which they played their home games at the Omni Coliseum, which was scheduled for demolition after the season. The Hawks played their final game at "The Omni" in a Game 4 loss to the Bulls, during the second round of the NBA playoffs, 89–80 on May 11, 1997.

Following the season, Barry signed as a free agent with the Los Angeles Lakers, while James re-signed with his former team, the Cleveland Cavaliers, and Ken Norman was released to free agency; Norman only played just 17 games this season due to a back injury.

== Offseason ==
=== Draft picks ===
Round	Pick	Player	Position	Nationality	College
1	28	Priest Lauderdale (from Seattle)	Center	United States	Peristeri BC (Greece)

== Roster ==
1996–97 Atlanta Hawks roster
Players

Pos.	No.	Player	Height	Weight	DOB	From
G	17	Jon Barry	6 ft 4 in (1.93 m)	195 lb (88 kg)	1969–07–25	Georgia Tech
G	10	Mookie Blaylock	6 ft 0 in (1.83 m)	180 lb (82 kg)	1967–03–20	Oklahoma
F	33	Tyrone Corbin	6 ft 6 in (1.98 m)	210 lb (95 kg)	1962–12–31	DePaul
F	35	Darrin Hancock	6 ft 7 in (2.01 m)	205 lb (93 kg)	1971–11–03	Kansas
F	44	Alan Henderson	6 ft 9 in (2.06 m)	235 lb (107 kg)	1972–12–02	Indiana
F	42	Henry James	6 ft 8 in (2.03 m)	220 lb (100 kg)	1965–07–29	Saint Mary's
F/C	32	Christian Laettner	6 ft 11 in (2.11 m)	235 lb (107 kg)	1969–08–17	Duke
C	15	Priest Lauderdale	7 ft 4 in (2.24 m)	325 lb (147 kg)	1973–08–31	Central State
F	2	Anthony Miller (injured)	6 ft 9 in (2.06 m)	235 lb (107 kg)	1971–10–22	Michigan State
C	55	Dikembe Mutombo	7 ft 2 in (2.18 m)	260 lb (118 kg)	1966–06–25	Georgetown
F	28	Ivano Newbill	6 ft 9 in (2.06 m)	245 lb (111 kg)	1970–12–12	Georgia Tech
F	3	Ken Norman (injured)	6 ft 8 in (2.03 m)	215 lb (98 kg)	1964–09–05	Illinois
G	5	Eldridge Recasner	6 ft 3 in (1.91 m)	190 lb (86 kg)	1967–12–14	Washington
G	8	Steve Smith	6 ft 7 in (2.01 m)	200 lb (91 kg)	1969–03–31	Michigan State

Coaches
Head coach
- Lenny Wilkens
Assistant(s)
- Bill Hanzlik
- Dick Helm
- Gary Wortman

Legend
- (DP) Unsigned draft pick
- (FA) Free agent
- (S) Suspended
- Injured

Roster

=== Roster Notes ===
- Shooting guard Donnie Boyce was waived on March 4, 1997.
- Small forward Willie Burton was waived on January 7, 1997.
- Small forward Darrin Hancock played in two separate stints with the Hawks during the regular season; he was signed by the team after being waived by the Phoenix Suns, who acquired him from the Milwaukee Bucks. After the Hawks waived him, he signed with the San Antonio Spurs, where he would only play just one game for them before being released, and re-signed by the Hawks for the remainder of the season.
- Rookie center Priest Lauderdale holds both American and Bulgarian dual citizenship.

== Regular season ==
=== Season standings ===
Central Division	W	L	PCT	GB	Home	Road	Div
y-Chicago Bulls	69	13	.841	–	39–2	30–11	24–4
x-Atlanta Hawks	56	26	.683	13	36–5	20–21	17–11
x-Detroit Pistons	54	28	.659	15	30–11	24–17	17–11
x-Charlotte Hornets	54	28	.659	15	30–11	24–17	14–14
Cleveland Cavaliers	42	40	.512	27	25–16	17–24	13–15
Indiana Pacers	39	43	.476	30	21–20	18–23	11–17
Milwaukee Bucks	33	49	.402	36	20–21	13–28	10–18
Toronto Raptors	30	52	.366	39	18–23	12–29	6–22

1996–97 NBA East standings
#	Eastern Conference				
#	Team	W	L	PCT	GB
1	z-Chicago Bulls	69	13	.841	–
2	y-Miami Heat	61	21	.744	8
3	x-New York Knicks	57	25	.695	12
4	x-Atlanta Hawks	56	26	.683	13
5	x-Detroit Pistons	54	28	.659	15
6	x-Charlotte Hornets	54	28	.659	15
7	x-Orlando Magic	45	37	.549	24
8	x-Washington Bullets	44	38	.537	25
9	Cleveland Cavaliers	42	40	.512	27
10	Indiana Pacers	39	43	.476	30
11	Milwaukee Bucks	33	49	.402	36
12	Toronto Raptors	30	52	.366	39
13	New Jersey Nets	26	56	.317	43
14	Philadelphia 76ers	22	60	.268	47
15	Boston Celtics	15	67	.183	54

z = clinched division title
y = clinched division title
x = clinched playoff spot

=== Game log ===
1996–97 game log
Total: 56–26 (home: 36–5; road: 20–21)
November: 9–7 (home: 4–1; road: 5–6)

Game	Date	Team	Score	High points	Location Attendance	Record
1	November 1	@ Miami Heat	L 81-94		Miami Arena; 15,133	0–1
2	November 2	Detroit Pistons	L 78-90		Omni Coliseum; 16,378	0–2
3	November 4	@ Portland Trail Blazers	W 94-76		Rose Garden Arena; 21,567	1–2
4	November 5	@ Seattle SuperSonics	W 117-95		KeyArena at Seattle Center; 17,072	2-2
5	November 7	@ Sacramento Kings	W 91-87		ARCO Arena; 17,317	3–2
6	November 10	@ Los Angeles Lakers	L 85-92		Great Western Forum; 16,097	3-3
7	November 12	Cleveland Cavaliers	W 87-83		Omni Coliseum	4–3
8	November 13	@ Boston Celtics	L 85-103		FleetCenter; 13,184	4-4
9	November 15	Miami Heat	W 85-77		Omni Coliseum; 16,378	5–4
10	November 16	@ Chicago Bulls	L 69-97		United Center; 23,939	5-5
11	November 19	@ Cleveland Cavaliers	L 63-73		Gund Arena; 14,182	5–6
12	November 21	@ Milwaukee Bucks	W 73-65		Bradley Center; 14,698	6-6
13	November 23	@ Toronto Raptors	W 91-88		SkyDome; 16,838	7–6
14	November 26	Vancouver Grizzlies	W 101-80		Omni Coliseum	8–6
15	November 27	@ Orlando Magic	L 75-79		Orlando Arena; 17,248	8–7
16	November 29	Washington Bullets	W 110-81		Omni Coliseum; 12,457	9–7

December: 7–4 (home: 6–0; road: 1–4)

Game	Date	Team	Score	High points	Location Attendance	Record
17	December 3	Boston Celtics	W 105-95		Omni Coliseum	10–7
18	December 4	@ Detroit Pistons	L 90-100		The Palace of Auburn Hills; 14,574	10–8
19	December 7	Toronto Raptors	W 101-75		Omni Coliseum; 11,422	11–8
20	December 10	Denver Nuggets	W 89-88		Omni Coliseum	12–8
21	December 14	Philadelphia 76ers	W 106-81		Omni Coliseum; 12,473	13–8
22	December 17	@ Dallas Mavericks	W 109-73		Reunion Arena; 14,805	14–8
23	December 20	New Jersey Nets	W 109-95		Omni Coliseum; 12,884	15–8
24	December 21	@ Charlotte Hornets	L 93-98		Charlotte Coliseum; 24,042	15–9
25	December 23	@ New York Knicks	L 76-82		Madison Square Garden; 19,763	15–10
26	December 26	Chicago Bulls	W 108-103		Omni Coliseum; 16,378	16–10
27	December 28	@ Washington Bullets	L 86-97		US Airways Arena; 11,797	16–11

January: 14–2 (home: 9–0; road: 5–2)

Game	Date	Team	Score	High points	Location Attendance	Record
28	January 3	@ New Jersey Nets	W 95-85		Continental Airlines Arena; 14,310	17–11
29	January 4	New York Knicks	W 88-71		Omni Coliseum; 16,378	18–11
30	January 7	Phoenix Suns	W 105-103 (OT)		Omni Coliseum	19–11
31	January 9	@ Orlando Magic	W 97-92 (OT)		Orlando Arena; 17,248	20–11
32	January 11	San Antonio Spurs	W 87-82 (OT)		Omni Coliseum; 15,877	21–11
33	January 13	@ Cleveland Cavaliers	W 93-79		Gund Arena; 14,565	22–11
34	January 14	Minnesota Timberwolves	W 95-93		Omni Coliseum; 14,032	23–11
35	January 16	Orlando Magic	W 78-67		Omni Coliseum; 16,378	24–11
36	January 18	Milwaukee Bucks	W 94-71		Omni Coliseum; 16,378	25–11
37	January 20	Charlotte Hornets	W 106-97		Omni Coliseum; 16,378	26–11
38	January 21	@ Miami Heat	L 91-94		Miami Arena; 14,853	26–12
39	January 24	Washington Bullets	W 117-105 (OT)		Omni Coliseum; 15,325	27–12
40	January 25	Boston Celtics	W 95-90		Omni Coliseum; 16,378	28–12
41	January 28	@ Los Angeles Clippers	W 112-96		Los Angeles Memorial Sports Arena	29–12
42	January 30	@ Utah Jazz	L 96-102		Delta Center; 19,911	29–13
43	January 31	@ Vancouver Grizzlies	W 87-76		General Motors Place; 15,205	30–13

February: 8–5 (home: 5–2; road: 3–3)

Game	Date	Team	Score	High points	Location Attendance	Record
44	February 2	@ Denver Nuggets	L 104-115		McNichols Sports Arena; 13,122	30–14
45	February 4	@ Golden State Warriors	W 107-85		San Jose Arena; 13,111	31–14
46	February 5	@ Phoenix Suns	L 81-99		America West Arena; 19,023	31–15
47	February 12	Toronto Raptors	W 106-84		Omni Coliseum; 13,846	32–15
48	February 14	Chicago Bulls	L 88-89		Omni Coliseum; 16,378	32–16
49	February 15	@ San Antonio Spurs	W 109-89		Alamodome; 26,809	33–16
50	February 17	@ Houston Rockets	L 98-127		The Summit; 16,285	33–17
51	February 19	Indiana Pacers	W 100-87		Omni Coliseum; 16,378	34–17
52	February 21	Houston Rockets	W 76-74		Omni Coliseum; 16,378	35–17
53	February 22	Charlotte Hornets	L 92-93		Omni Coliseum; 16,378	35–18
54	February 24	Golden State Warriors	W 106-100		Omni Coliseum; 15,660	36–18
55	February 26	@ Milwaukee Bucks	W 79-72		Bradley Center; 13,285	37–18
56	February 28	Los Angeles Lakers	W 86-75		Omni Coliseum; 16,378	38–18

March: 12–4 (home: 9–1; road: 3–3)

Game	Date	Team	Score	High points	Location Attendance	Record
57	March 2	@ Detroit Pistons	L 75-82		The Palace of Auburn Hills; 21,454	38–19
58	March 4	Cleveland Cavaliers	W 93-88		Omni Coliseum; 15,404	39–19
59	March 6	@ Philadelphia 76ers	W 117-104		CoreStates Center; 13,802	40–19
60	March 7	Milwaukee Bucks	W 90-80		Omni Coliseum; 14,906	41–19
61	March 9	@ Boston Celtics	W 114-90		FleetCenter; 16,931	42–19
62	March 11	Utah Jazz	W 106-99		Omni Coliseum; 14,475	43–19
63	March 12	@ Indiana Pacers	L 82-92		Market Square Arena; 14,824	43–20
64	March 14	Seattle SuperSonics	L 91-97		Omni Coliseum; 16,378	43–21
65	March 15	@ Chicago Bulls	L 79-99		United Center; 23,984	43–22
66	March 17	Orlando Magic	W 112-107 (OT)		Omni Coliseum; 15,708	44–22
67	March 19	Indiana Pacers	W 107-95		Omni Coliseum; 14,099	45–22
68	March 21	Dallas Mavericks	W 93-72		Omni Coliseum; 13,809	46–22
69	March 23	@ Toronto Raptors	W 90-79		SkyDome; 18,533	47–22
70	March 25	Portland Trail Blazers	W 96-89		Omni Coliseum; 15,256	48–22
71	March 27	Los Angeles Clippers	W 103-88		Omni Coliseum; 13,876	49–22
72	March 29	Sacramento Kings	W 88-74		Omni Coliseum; 14,942	50–22

April: 6–4 (home: 3–1; road: 3–3)

Game	Date	Team	Score	High points	Location Attendance	Record
73	April 2	@ Charlotte Hornets	L 84-95		Charlotte Coliseum; 24,042	50–23
74	April 4	Detroit Pistons	W 103-89		Omni Coliseum; 16,378	51–23
75	April 5	New York Knicks	L 97-102		Omni Coliseum; 16,378	51–24
76	April 9	@ Philadelphia 76ers	W 116-101		CoreStates Center; 16,549	52–24
77	April 11	@ Indiana Pacers	W 104-92		Market Square Arena; 16,403	53–24
78	April 12	@ Minnesota Timberwolves	W 80-66		Target Center; 18,874	54–24
79	April 15	New Jersey Nets	W 109-101		Omni Coliseum; 14,458	55–24
80	April 16	@ New York Knicks	L 92-96		Madison Square Garden; 19,763	55–25
81	April 19	Philadelphia 76ers	W 136-104		Omni Coliseum; 16,457	56–25
82	April 20	@ New Jersey Nets	L 92-108		Continental Airlines Arena; 18,702	56–26

1996–97 season schedule

== Playoffs ==
1997 playoff game log
First round: 3–2 (home: 2–1; road: 1–1)

Game	Date	Team	Score	High points	High rebounds	High assists	Location Attendance	Series
1	April 25	Detroit	W 89–75	Dikembe Mutombo (26)	Dikembe Mutombo (15)	Christian Laettner (4)	Omni Coliseum; 15,795	1–0
2	April 27	Detroit	L 80–93	Steve Smith (22)	Mookie Blaylock (9)	Mookie Blaylock (7)	Omni Coliseum; 16,378	1–1
3	April 29	@ Detroit	L 91–99	Christian Laettner (25)	Dikembe Mutombo (21)	Mookie Blaylock (10)	The Palace of Auburn Hills; 20,059	1–2
4	May 2	@ Detroit	W 94–82	Steve Smith (28)	Mutombo, Laettner (12)	Mookie Blaylock (9)	The Palace of Auburn Hills; 21,454	2–2
5	May 4	Detroit	W 84–79	Christian Laettner (23)	Mutombo, Blaylock (9)	Blaylock, Corbin (5)	Omni Coliseum; 16,378	3–2

Conference Semi-finals: 1–4 (home: 0–2; road: 1–2)

Game	Date	Team	Score	High points	High rebounds	High assists	Location Attendance	Series
1	May 6	@ Chicago	L 97–100	Mookie Blaylock (31)	Mookie Blaylock (12)	Christian Laettner (6)	United Center; 24,397	0–1
2	May 8	@ Chicago	W 103–95	Steve Smith (27)	Dikembe Mutombo (15)	Mookie Blaylock (9)	United Center; 24,544	1–1
3	May 10	Chicago	L 80–100	Dikembe Mutombo (16)	Dikembe Mutombo (13)	Mookie Blaylock (6)	Omni Coliseum; 16,378	1–2
4	May 11	Chicago	L 80–89	Christian Laettner (21)	Christian Laettner (12)	Mookie Blaylock (4)	Omni Coliseum; 16,378	1–3
5	May 13	@ Chicago	L 92–107	Christian Laettner (23)	Dikembe Mutombo (12)	Mookie Blaylock (8)	United Center; 24,544	1–4

1997 schedule

== Player statistics ==
Legend
GP	Games played	GS	Games started	MPG	Minutes per game
FG%	Field-goal percentage	3P%	3-point field-goal percentage	FT%	Free-throw percentage
RPG	Rebounds per game	APG	Assists per game	SPG	Steals per game
BPG	Blocks per game	PPG	Points per game

=== Season ===
Player	GP	GS	MPG	FG%	3P%	FT%	RPG	APG	SPG	BPG	PPG
Derrick Alston	2	0	5.5	.000	.	.000	2.0	.0	.0	.0	.0
Jon Barry	58	8	16.6	.407	.387	.804	1.7	2.0	.9	.1	4.9
Mookie Blaylock	78	78	39.2	.432	.366	.753	5.3	5.9	2.7	.3	17.4
Donnie Boyce	22	2	7.0	.333	.125	.500	.7	.6	.5	.2	2.5
Willie Burton	24	2	15.8	.336	.283	.838	1.7	.5	.3	.1	6.2
Tyrone Corbin	70	65	32.9	.422	.356	.796	4.2	1.8	1.3	.1	9.5
Darrin Hancock	14	0	6.1	.481	.	.667	.9	.5	.5	.1	2.4
Alan Henderson	30	0	16.7	.475	.	.600	3.9	.8	.7	.2	6.6
Henry James	53	15	17.8	.408	.420	.833	1.5	.4	.2	.0	6.7
Christian Laettner	82	82	38.3	.486	.352	.816	8.8	2.7	1.2	.8	18.1
Priest Lauderdale	35	0	5.1	.551	.000	.565	1.2	.3	.0	.3	3.2
Anthony Miller	1	0	14.0	.000	.	.	7.0	.0	.0	.0	.0
Dikembe Mutombo	80	80	37.2	.527	.	.705	11.6	1.4	.6	3.3	13.3
Ivano Newbill	72	2	11.8	.440	.	.385	2.8	.3	.4	.2	1.4
Ken Norman	17	0	12.9	.287	.158	.333	2.3	.7	.4	.2	3.8
Eldridge Recasner	71	4	17.0	.423	.414	.879	1.6	1.3	.5	.1	5.7
Steve Smith	72	72	39.1	.429	.335	.847	3.3	4.2	.9	.3	20.1

=== Playoffs ===
Player	GP	GS	MPG	FG%	3P%	FT%	RPG	APG	SPG	BPG	PPG
Jon Barry	2	0	4.5	.000	.000	.	.	.	.	.	.
Mookie Blaylock	10	10	44.1	.396	.329	.667	7.0	6.5	2.1	.2	16.4
Tyrone Corbin	10	10	36.4	.457	.351	1.000	4.3	2.0	.4	.2	10.6
Darrin Hancock	6	0	5.5	.400	.000	.000	.8	.2	.2	.2	.7
Alan Henderson	10	0	13.6	.559	.	.769	3.3	.	.1	.3	5.8
Henry James	8	0	5.6	.231	.333	.	.1	.3	.1	.	1.0
Christian Laettner	10	10	40.3	.405	.190	.857	7.2	2.6	1.0	.8	17.6
Priest Lauderdale	3	0	2.3	.000	.	.	.7	.	.	.	.
Dikembe Mutombo	10	10	41.5	.628	.	.719	12.3	1.3	.1	2.6	15.4
Ivano Newbill	3	0	1.7	.	.	.	.3	.3	.	.	.
Eldridge Recasner	10	0	12.1	.423	.364	.625	1.1	.9	.2	.	3.1
Steve Smith	10	10	42.1	.396	.327	.824	3.9	1.7	.4	.1	18.9

Player statistics citation:

== Awards and records ==
=== Awards ===
- Dikembe Mutombo, NBA Defensive Player of the Year Award
- Dikembe Mutombo, NBA All-Defensive First Team
- Mookie Blaylock, NBA All-Defensive Second Team

== Transactions ==
=== Trades ===
July 15, 1996

- Traded Stacey Augmon, and Grant Long to the Detroit Pistons for a 1997 second round draft pick, a 1999 first round draft pick, and a 1999 second round draft pick.

=== Free agents ===
July 15, 1996

- Signed Dikembe Mutombo as a free agent.

August 13, 1996

- Signed Jon Barry as a free agent.

September 12, 1996

- Signed Willie Burton as a free agent.
- Signed Tyrone Corbin as a free agent.

September 27, 1996

- Signed Eldridge Recasner as a free agent.

October 2, 1996

- Signed Ivano Newbill as a free agent.
- Signed Melvin Booker as a free agent.

October 28, 1996

- Waived Willie Burton.
- Waived Melvin Booker.

November 13, 1996

- Signed Derrick Alston as a free agent.

November 14, 1996

- Signed Willie Burton as a free agent.
- Signed Anthony Miller as a free agent.

November 26, 1996

- Waived Derrick Alston.

December 20, 1996

- Signed Henry James as a free agent.

January 2, 1997

- Signed Darrin Hancock as a free agent.

January 7, 1997

- Waived Darrin Hancock.
- Waived Willie Burton.

March 4, 1997

- Waived Donnie Boyce.

March 5, 1997

- Signed Darrin Hancock to the first of two 10-day contracts.

March 25, 1997

- Signed Darrin Hancock to a contract for the rest of the season.

==== Additions ====
Player	Signed	Former team
Dikembe Mutombo		Denver Nuggets

==== Subtractions ====
Player	Left	New team

Player transactions citation:

== See also ==
- 1996–97 NBA season
