= 1996–97 New York Knicks season =

Season of National Basketball Association team the New York Knicks

- Head coach: Jeff Van Gundy
- General manager: Ernie Grunfeld
- Owners: ITT; Cablevision
- Arena: Madison Square Garden

Results
- Record: 57–25 (.695)
- Place: Division: 2nd (Atlantic); Conference: 3rd (Eastern)
- Playoff finish: Conference semifinals (lost to Heat 3–4)
- Stats at Basketball Reference

Local media
- Television: MSG Network; WBIS-TV
- Radio: WFAN

The 1996–97 New York Knicks season was the 51st season for the Knicks in the National Basketball Association.

== Season summary ==
=== Off-season ===
For the season, the Knicks celebrated their 50th anniversary in the NBA by revealing an anniversary version of the team's primary logo. During the off-season, the team acquired All-Star forward Larry Johnson from the Charlotte Hornets, and signed free agents Allan Houston, Chris Childs, former All-Star forward Buck Williams, and Scott Brooks.

The Knicks also had three first-round draft picks in the 1996 NBA draft, selecting small forward John Wallace out of Syracuse University with the 18th overall pick, small forward Walter McCarty from the University of Kentucky with the 19th overall pick, and small forward Dontae' Jones out of Mississippi State University with the 21st overall pick. However, Jones would miss the entire regular season due to a left foot injury, and would never play for the Knicks.

=== Regular season ===
In the regular season, and with the addition of Johnson, Houston, Childs and Williams, the Knicks won eight of their first ten games, and later on held a 34–14 record at the All-Star break. The team finished in second place in the Atlantic Division with a 57–25 record, earning the third seed in the Eastern Conference, and qualifying for the NBA playoffs for the tenth consecutive year. The team also posted three seven-game winning streaks during the regular season, which were its longest this season. The Knicks enjoyed a successful season, with their 57 wins tied for the third-most in franchise history. In the final game of the regular season, at the United Center on April 19, 1997, the Knicks defeated the then-69–12 Chicago Bulls, 103–101, preventing them from posting two consecutive 70-win seasons, and tying the best home record at 40–1, which was set by the 1985–86 Boston Celtics, and later on matched by the 2015–16 San Antonio Spurs.

Patrick Ewing averaged 22.4 points, 10.7 rebounds and 2.4 blocks per game, and was named to the All-NBA Second Team, while Houston finished second on the team in scoring with 14.8 points per game, and with 148 three-point field goals. In addition, and with Houston as the Knicks' starting shooting guard, John Starks played a sixth man role off the bench, averaging 13.8 points per game and leading the team with 150 three-point field goals; he was named the NBA Sixth Man of the Year, receiving 84 out of a possible 115 first-place votes from the media. Meanwhile, Johnson averaged 12.8 points and 5.2 rebounds per game, Charles Oakley provided the team with 10.8 points, 9.8 rebounds and 1.4 steals per game, and Childs contributed 9.3 points and 6.1 assists per game. Off the bench, Williams averaged 6.3 points and 5.4 rebounds per game, while Charlie Ward provided the Knicks with 5.2 points and 4.1 assists per game, and Wallace contributed 4.8 points per game.

During the NBA All-Star weekend at the Gund Arena in Cleveland, Ohio, Ewing was selected for the 1997 NBA All-Star Game, as a member of the Eastern Conference All-Star team, while Wallace was selected for the NBA Rookie Game, as a member of the Eastern Conference Rookie team. However, Ewing did not participate in the All-Star Game due to a groin injury, despite playing 78 games this season; it would also be his final All-Star selection, having played in his final All-Star Game the previous year. Ewing also finished in eighth place in Most Valuable Player voting, and was named one of the 50 Greatest Players in NBA History.

The Knicks finished fifth in the NBA in home-game attendance, with an attendance of 790,520 at Madison Square Garden during the regular season.

=== NBA playoffs ===
In the Eastern Conference First Round of the 1997 NBA playoffs, the Knicks faced off against the 6th–seeded Charlotte Hornets, a team that featured All-Star forward Glen Rice, Anthony Mason, and Vlade Divac. The Knicks won their first two home games at Madison Square Garden, before winning Game 3 over the Hornets on the road, 104–95 at the Charlotte Coliseum to win the series in a three-game sweep, and advance to the Eastern Conference Semi-finals.

In the Semi-finals, the team faced off against the 2nd–seeded, and Atlantic Division champion Miami Heat, who were led by All-Star guard Tim Hardaway, All-Star center Alonzo Mourning, and Jamal Mashburn; this would eventually become the first chapter of one of the fiercest NBA rivalries of the period. The Knicks held a 3–1 lead in the series after defeating the Heat in Game 4 at Madison Square Garden, 89–76.

One notable incident of the series occurred in Game 5 at the Miami Arena, in which the Knicks lost to the Heat by a score of 96–81. During the fourth quarter, a brawl erupted when Heat forward P.J. Brown picked up Ward and threw him off the court, and several Knicks players—Ewing, Houston, Johnson and Starks—came off the bench during the altercation. Five Knicks players were suspended, with four of them receiving automatic one-game suspensions for leaving the bench during an altercation; Ewing, Houston and Ward were all suspended for Game 6, while Johnson and Starks were both suspended for Game 7, and Brown was suspended for two games. The Knicks lost Game 6 to the Heat at Madison Square Garden, 95–90, before losing Game 7 at the Miami Arena, 101–90, despite a 37-point performance from Ewing, thus losing in a hard-fought seven-game series.

=== Aftermath ===
Following the season, Wallace was traded to the Toronto Raptors in a three-team trade, and McCarty, Brooks and Jones were all traded to the Boston Celtics; Brooks was soon released by the Celtics, and signed as a free agent with the Cleveland Cavaliers during the following season.

== NBA draft ==
Round	Pick	Player	Position	Nationality	School/Club team
1	18	John Wallace	SF	United States	Syracuse
1	19	Walter McCarty	SF/PF	United States	Kentucky
1	21	Dontae' Jones	SF	United States	Mississippi State

== Roster ==
1996–97 New York Knicks roster
Players

Pos.	No.	Player	Height	Weight	DOB	From
G	4	Scott Brooks	5 ft 11 in (1.80 m)	165 lb (75 kg)	1965–07–31	UC Irvine
G	1	Chris Childs	6 ft 3 in (1.91 m)	195 lb (88 kg)	1967–11–20	Boise State
C	33	Patrick Ewing	7 ft 0 in (2.13 m)	240 lb (109 kg)	1962–08–05	Georgetown
G	20	Allan Houston	6 ft 6 in (1.98 m)	200 lb (91 kg)	1971–04–20	Tennessee
F	2	Larry Johnson	6 ft 7 in (2.01 m)	250 lb (113 kg)	1969–03–14	UNLV
F	5	Dontae' Jones (injured) (IN)	6 ft 8 in (2.03 m)	220 lb (100 kg)	1975–06–02	Mississippi State
F	40	Walter McCarty	6 ft 10 in (2.08 m)	230 lb (104 kg)	1974–02–01	Kentucky
F	34	Charles Oakley	6 ft 8 in (2.03 m)	225 lb (102 kg)	1963–12–18	Virginia Union
G	3	John Starks	6 ft 3 in (1.91 m)	180 lb (82 kg)	1965–08–10	Oklahoma State
F	44	John Wallace	6 ft 8 in (2.03 m)	225 lb (102 kg)	1974–02–09	Syracuse
G	21	Charlie Ward	6 ft 2 in (1.88 m)	190 lb (86 kg)	1970–10–12	Florida State
F	52	Buck Williams	6 ft 8 in (2.03 m)	215 lb (98 kg)	1960–03–08	Maryland
C	32	Herb Williams	6 ft 10 in (2.08 m)	242 lb (110 kg)	1958–02–16	Ohio State

Coaches
Head coach
- Jeff Van Gundy
Assistant(s)
- Greg Brittenham
- Don Chaney
- Brendan Malone
- Jeff Nix
- Tom Thibodeau

Legend
- (DP) Unsigned draft pick
- (FA) Free agent
- (S) Suspended
- (IN) Inactive
- Injured

Roster
Updated: January 6, 1997

=== Roster notes ===
- Rookie small forward Dontae' Jones was on the injured reserve list due to a left foot injury, missed the entire regular season, and never played for the Knicks.

== Regular season ==
=== Season standings ===
Atlantic Division	W	L	PCT	GB	Home	Road	Div
y-Miami Heat	61	21	.744	–	29–12	32–9	16–8
x-New York Knicks	57	25	.695	4	31–10	26–15	19–6
x-Orlando Magic	45	37	.549	16	26–15	19–22	13–11
x-Washington Bullets	44	38	.537	17	25–16	19–22	14–10
New Jersey Nets	26	56	.317	35	16–25	10–31	11–13
Philadelphia 76ers	22	60	.268	39	11–30	11–30	11–14
Boston Celtics	15	67	.183	46	11–30	4–37	1–23

1996–97 NBA East standings
#	Eastern Conference				
#	Team	W	L	PCT	GB
1	z-Chicago Bulls	69	13	.841	–
2	y-Miami Heat	61	21	.744	8
3	x-New York Knicks	57	25	.695	12
4	x-Atlanta Hawks	56	26	.683	13
5	x-Detroit Pistons	54	28	.659	15
6	x-Charlotte Hornets	54	28	.659	15
7	x-Orlando Magic	45	37	.549	24
8	x-Washington Bullets	44	38	.537	25
9	Cleveland Cavaliers	42	40	.512	27
10	Indiana Pacers	39	43	.476	30
11	Milwaukee Bucks	33	49	.402	36
12	Toronto Raptors	30	52	.366	39
13	New Jersey Nets	26	56	.317	43
14	Philadelphia 76ers	22	60	.268	47
15	Boston Celtics	15	67	.183	54

z – clinched division title
y – clinched division title
x – clinched playoff spot

== Playoffs ==
1997 playoff game log
First Round: 3–0 (home: 2–0; road: 1–0)

Game	Date	Team	Score	High points	High rebounds	High assists	Location Attendance	Series
1	April 24	Charlotte	W 109–99	Allan Houston (25)	Patrick Ewing (9)	Chris Childs (8)	Madison Square Garden; 19,763	1–0
2	April 26	Charlotte	W 100–93	Patrick Ewing (30)	Charles Oakley (10)	Chris Childs (9)	Madison Square Garden; 19,763	2–0
3	April 28	@ Charlotte	W 104–95	Larry Johnson (22)	Patrick Ewing (11)	Johnson, Childs (5)	Charlotte Coliseum; 24,042	3–0

Conference semifinals: 3–4 (home: 2–1; road: 1–3)

Game	Date	Team	Score	High points	High rebounds	High assists	Location Attendance	Series
1	May 7	@ Miami	W 88–79	Allan Houston (27)	Patrick Ewing (16)	Johnson, Ward (5)	Miami Arena; 14,870	1–0
2	May 9	@ Miami	L 84–88	Allan Houston (19)	Patrick Ewing (11)	Chris Childs (7)	Miami Arena; 14,870	1–1
3	May 11	Miami	W 77–73	Patrick Ewing (25)	Ewing, Oakley (11)	Ward, Starks (4)	Madison Square Garden; 19,763	2–1
4	May 12	Miami	W 89–76	John Starks (21)	Charles Oakley (9)	Chris Childs (8)	Madison Square Garden; 19,763	3–1
5	May 14	@ Miami	L 81–96	Patrick Ewing (19)	Charles Oakley (9)	Chris Childs (7)	Miami Arena; 14,782	3–2
6	May 16	Miami	L 90–95	Chris Childs (22)	Charles Oakley (12)	Chris Childs (9)	Madison Square Garden; 19,763	3–3
7	May 18	@ Miami	L 90–101	Patrick Ewing (37)	Patrick Ewing (17)	Charlie Ward (8)	Miami Arena; 14,870	3–4

1997 schedule

== Player statistics ==
Legend
GP	Games played	GS	Games started	MPG	Minutes per game
FG%	Field-goal percentage	3P%	3-point field-goal percentage	FT%	Free-throw percentage
RPG	Rebounds per game	APG	Assists per game	SPG	Steals per game
BPG	Blocks per game	PPG	Points per game

=== Regular season ===
Player	GP	GS	MPG	FG%	3P%	FT%	RPG	APG	SPG	BPG	PPG
Scott Brooks	38	0	6.6	.487	.417	.933	.5	.8	.6	.0	1.5
Chris Childs	65	61	31.9	.414	.387	.758	2.9	6.1	1.2	.2	9.3
Patrick Ewing	78	78	37.0	.488	.222	.754	10.7	2.0	.9	2.4	22.4
Allan Houston	81	81	33.1	.423	.385	.803	3.0	2.2	.5	.2	14.8
Chris Jent	3	0	3.3	.333	.667		.3	.3	.0	.0	2.0
Larry Johnson	76	76	34.4	.512	.324	.693	5.2	2.3	.8	.5	12.8
Walter McCarty	35	0	5.5	.382	.286	.571	.7	.4	.2	.3	1.8
Charles Oakley	80	80	35.9	.488	.263	.808	9.8	2.8	1.4	.3	10.8
John Starks	77	1	26.5	.431	.369	.769	2.7	2.8	1.2	.1	13.8
John Wallace	68	6	11.6	.517	.500	.718	2.3	.5	.3	.4	4.8
Charlie Ward	79	21	22.3	.395	.312	.760	2.8	4.1	1.1	.2	5.2
Buck Williams	74	4	20.2	.537	.000	.642	5.4	.7	.5	.5	6.3
Herb Williams	21	2	8.8	.391	.000	.750	1.5	.2	.2	.2	1.9

=== Playoffs ===
Player	GP	GS	MPG	FG%	3P%	FT%	RPG	APG	SPG	BPG	PPG
Scott Brooks	4	0	1.8	.500		1.000	.0	.0	.0	.0	.8
Chris Childs	10	10	32.8	.437	.346	.826	4.9	5.9	2.0	.0	10.4
Patrick Ewing	9	9	39.7	.527	.000	.643	10.6	1.9	.3	2.4	22.6
Allan Houston	9	9	40.0	.436	.500	.886	2.6	2.3	.7	.3	19.2
Larry Johnson	9	9	32.8	.558	.353	.842	4.0	2.6	.8	.1	13.8
Walter McCarty	2	0	2.0	1.000			.0	.0	.5	.0	2.0
Charles Oakley	10	10	35.8	.442	.000	.759	8.8	1.6	2.2	.3	9.8
John Starks	9	1	28.1	.444	.317	.806	3.4	2.8	1.1	.0	14.0
John Wallace	4	1	10.0	.267	.000	1.000	1.8	1.3	.3	.5	2.5
Charlie Ward	9	0	20.2	.296	.111	.750	2.8	4.3	1.4	.0	2.2
Buck Williams	10	1	19.3	.486		.529	4.0	.6	.3	.4	4.3
Herb Williams	3	0	7.7	.400			.3	.0	.0	.0	1.3

- ^{†} Denotes player spent time with another team in the season. Stats reflect time with the Knicks only.

Player statistics citation:

== Awards and records ==
- John Starks, NBA Sixth Man of the Year Award
- Patrick Ewing, All-NBA Second Team
