= 1996–97 Milwaukee Bucks season =

NBA professional basketball team season

- Head coach: Chris Ford
- General manager: Mike Dunleavy
- Owner: Herb Kohl
- Arena: Bradley Center

Results
- Record: 33–49 (.402)
- Place: Division: 7th (Central); Conference: 11th (Eastern)
- Playoff finish: Did not qualify
- Stats at Basketball Reference

Local media
- Television: WVTV; Wisconsin Sports Network (Jim Paschke, Jon McGlocklin)
- Radio: WTMJ

The 1996–97 Milwaukee Bucks season was the 29th season for the Milwaukee Bucks in the National Basketball Association.

== Season summary ==
=== Off-season ===
The Bucks received the fourth overall pick in the 1996 NBA draft, and selected point guard Stephon Marbury out of Georgia Tech University; however, the team soon traded Marbury to the Minnesota Timberwolves in exchange for rookie shooting guard, and first-round draft pick Ray Allen from the University of Connecticut on draft day. During the off-season, the Bucks signed free agent Armen Gilliam, acquired Andrew Lang from the Timberwolves, acquired Elliot Perry from the Phoenix Suns, and hired Chris Ford as their new head coach.

=== Regular season ===
Under Ford and with the addition of Allen, Gilliam, Perry and Lang, the Bucks won five of their first six games of the regular season, and got off to a 15–11 start to the season. However, the team soon fell below .500 in winning percentage, and held a 21–26 record at the All-Star break. At mid-season, the team traded second-year guard Shawn Respert to the Toronto Raptors in exchange for Acie Earl. The Bucks struggled posting an eight-game losing streak between February and March, and finished in seventh place in the Central Division with a 33–49 record; the team missed the NBA playoffs for the sixth consecutive year.

Vin Baker averaged 21.0 points, 10.3 rebounds and 1.4 blocks per game, and was named to the All-NBA Third Team, while Glenn Robinson averaged 21.1 points, 6.3 rebounds and 1.3 steals per game, and Allen provided the team with 13.4 points per game, led them with 117 three-point field goals, and was named to the NBA All-Rookie Second Team. In addition, Sherman Douglas provided with 9.7 points and 5.4 assists per game, while off the bench, Johnny Newman contributed 8.7 points per game, Gilliam averaged 8.6 points and 6.2 rebounds per game, Perry contributed 6.9 points, 3.0 assists and 1.2 steals per game, and Lang, the team's starting center, averaged 5.3 points and rebounds per game each, but only played 52 games due to an Achilles injury.

During the NBA All-Star weekend at the Gund Arena in Cleveland, Ohio, Baker was selected for the 1997 NBA All-Star Game, as a member of the Eastern Conference All-Star team. Off the bench, Baker posted a double-double of 19 points and 12 rebounds, as the Eastern Conference defeated the Western Conference, 132–120. Meanwhile, Allen was selected for the NBA Rookie Game, as a member of the Eastern Conference Rookie team, and also participated in the NBA Slam Dunk Contest.

The Bucks finished 22nd in the NBA in home-game attendance, with an attendance of 634,999 at the Bradley Center during the regular season.

=== Aftermath ===
Following the season, Baker was traded to the Seattle SuperSonics in an off-season three-team trade, and after four seasons with the Bucks, while Newman was traded to the Denver Nuggets on draft day. Meanwhile, Douglas, who was involved in a trade with the Cleveland Cavaliers, signed as a free agent with the New Jersey Nets, and Earl was released to free agency.

== Draft picks ==
Round	Pick	Player	Position	Nationality	College
1	4	Stephon Marbury	PG	United States	Georgia Tech
2	33	Moochie Norris	PG	United States	West Florida
2	53	Jeff Nordgaard	SF	United States	Wisconsin-Green Bay

== Roster ==
1996–97 Milwaukee Bucks roster
Players

Pos.	No.	Player	Height	Weight	DOB	From
G	34	Ray Allen	6 ft 5 in (1.96 m)	205 lb (93 kg)	1975–07–20	Connecticut
F	42	Vin Baker	6 ft 11 in (2.11 m)	232 lb (105 kg)	1971–11–23	Hartford
F	52	Chucky Brown	6 ft 7 in (2.01 m)	214 lb (97 kg)	1968–02–29	NC State
G	20	Sherman Douglas	6 ft 0 in (1.83 m)	180 lb (82 kg)	1966–09–15	Syracuse
C	55	Acie Earl	6 ft 10 in (2.08 m)	240 lb (109 kg)	1970–06–23	Iowa
F	10	Armen Gilliam	6 ft 9 in (2.06 m)	230 lb (104 kg)	1964–05–28	UNLV
C	28	Andrew Lang	6 ft 11 in (2.11 m)	245 lb (111 kg)	1966–06–28	Arkansas
G	21	Cuonzo Martin	6 ft 5 in (1.96 m)	213 lb (97 kg)	1971–09–23	Purdue
G	22	Johnny Newman	6 ft 7 in (2.01 m)	190 lb (86 kg)	1963–11–28	Richmond
G	5	Elliot Perry	6 ft 0 in (1.83 m)	150 lb (68 kg)	1969–03–28	Memphis
F	13	Glenn Robinson	6 ft 7 in (2.01 m)	240 lb (109 kg)	1973–01–10	Purdue
C	51	Keith Tower	6 ft 11 in (2.11 m)	250 lb (113 kg)	1970–05–15	Notre Dame
C	23	Joe Wolf	6 ft 11 in (2.11 m)	230 lb (104 kg)	1964–12–17	North Carolina
F	7	David Wood	6 ft 9 in (2.06 m)	227 lb (103 kg)	1964–11–30	Nevada

Coaches
Head coach
- Chris Ford
Assistant(s)
- Jim Todd
- Dick Versace
- Mike Woodson

Legend
- (DP) Unsigned draft pick
- (FA) Free agent
- (S) Suspended
- Injured

Roster

== Regular season ==
=== Season standings ===
Central Division	W	L	PCT	GB	Home	Road	Div
y-Chicago Bulls	69	13	.841	–	39–2	30–11	24–4
x-Atlanta Hawks	56	26	.683	13	36–5	20–21	17–11
x-Detroit Pistons	54	28	.659	15	30–11	24–17	17–11
x-Charlotte Hornets	54	28	.659	15	30–11	24–17	14–14
Cleveland Cavaliers	42	40	.512	27	25–16	17–24	13–15
Indiana Pacers	39	43	.476	30	21–20	18–23	11–17
Milwaukee Bucks	33	49	.402	36	20–21	13–28	10–18
Toronto Raptors	30	52	.366	39	18–23	12–29	6–22

1996–97 NBA East standings
#	Eastern Conference				
#	Team	W	L	PCT	GB
1	z-Chicago Bulls	69	13	.841	–
2	y-Miami Heat	61	21	.744	8
3	x-New York Knicks	57	25	.695	12
4	x-Atlanta Hawks	56	26	.683	13
5	x-Detroit Pistons	54	28	.659	15
6	x-Charlotte Hornets	54	28	.659	15
7	x-Orlando Magic	45	37	.549	24
8	x-Washington Bullets	44	38	.537	25
9	Cleveland Cavaliers	42	40	.512	27
10	Indiana Pacers	39	43	.476	30
11	Milwaukee Bucks	33	49	.402	36
12	Toronto Raptors	30	52	.366	39
13	New Jersey Nets	26	56	.317	43
14	Philadelphia 76ers	22	60	.268	47
15	Boston Celtics	15	67	.183	54

z - clinched division title
y - clinched division title
x - clinched playoff spot

=== Game log ===
1996–97 game log
Total: 33–49 (Home: 0–0; Road: 0–0)
November: 8–7 (home: 5–3; road: 3–4)

Game	Date	Team	Score	High points	High rebounds	High assists	Location Attendance	Record
1	November 1, 1996	@ Philadelphia	W 111–103	Vin Baker (25)			CoreStates Center; 20,444	1–0
2	November 2, 1996	Boston	W 124–102	Johnny Newman, Glenn Robinson (21)			Bradley Center; 17,275	2–0
3	November 6, 1996	Vancouver	W 105–89	Ray Allen, Vin Baker (20)	Vin Baker (11)	Sherman Douglas (8)	Bradley Center; 13,689	3–0
4	November 8, 1996	@ Miami	L 89—101	Vin Baker (27)			Miami Arena; 15,200	3–1
5	November 9, 1996	@ Charlotte	W 100—98	Vin Baker (28)			Charlotte Coliseum; 24,042	4–1
6	November 12, 1996	Phoenix	W 99–89	Vin Baker (32)			Bradley Center; 13,565	5–1
7	November 14, 1996	@ Golden State	L 86—95	Vin Baker (32)			San Jose Arena; 14,414	5–2
8	November 15, 1996	@ Sacramento	L 99—103	Glenn Robinson (29)			ARCO Arena; 17,317	5–3
9	November 17, 1996	@ L. A. Clippers	L 94—102	Glenn Robinson (31)	Armen Gilliam (13)		Los Angeles Memorial Sports Arena; 7,311	5–4
10	November 19, 1996	Dallas	W 100–97	Armen Gilliam (27)			Bradley Center; 13,225	6–4
11	November 21, 1996	Atlanta	L 65–73				Bradley Center; 14,698	6–5
12	November 23, 1996	Washington	L 90–95				Bradley Center; 16,508	6–6
13	November 25, 1996	@ Orlando	W 100–88				Orlando Arena; 16,808	7–6
14	November 27, 1996	Cleveland	W 92–75				Bradley Center; 14,189	8–6
15	November 30, 1996	Charlotte	L 87–94				Bradley Center; 16,327	8–7

December: 4–2 (home: 3–2; road: 1–0)

Game	Date	Team	Score	High points	High rebounds	High assists	Location Attendance	Record
16	December 3, 1996	Chicago	L 104–107				Bradley Center; 18,717	8–8
17	December 7, 1996	@ Washington	W 126–118	Glenn Robinson (44)	Vin Baker (13)		US Airways Arena; 18,756	9–8
18	December 8, 1996	Boston	W 100–87				Bradley Center; 13,350	10–8
19	December 10, 1996	Detroit	L 85–93				Bradley Center; 13,202	10–9
20	December 12, 1996	Seattle	W 100–97	Glenn Robinson (32)			Bradley Center; 16,355	11–9
21	December 14, 1996	New Jersey	W 101–91	Vin Baker, Glenn Robinson (27)			Bradley Center; 16,689	12–9
22	December 16, 1996	@ Boston	W 107–91				Fleet Center; 15,030	13–9
23	December 18, 1996	L. A. Lakers	W 105–111				Bradley Center; 16,829	13–10
24	December 19, 1996	@ Toronto	L 93–96				SkyDome; 15,321	13–11
25	December 21, 1996	Orlando	W 103–85				Bradley Center; 14,015	14–11
26	December 23, 1996	@ Houston	W 81–76				The Summit; 16,285	15–11
27	December 26, 1996	Houston	L 90–101				Bradley Center; 18,717	15–12
28	December 27, 1996	@ Cleveland	L 86–94				Gund Arena; 19,164	15–13
29	December 29, 1996	Miami	L 94–95				Bradley Center; 16,235	15–14

January: 0–0 (home: 0–0; road: 0–0)

Game	Date	Team	Score	High points	High rebounds	High assists	Location Attendance	Record
30	January 4, 1997	Minnesota	L 91–97				Bradley Center; 17,218	15–15
31	January 5, 1997	@ New York	L 92–97				Madison Square Garden; 19,763	15–16
32	January 7, 1997	@ Detroit	W 86–76				The Palace of Auburn Hills; 17,224	16–16
33	January 8, 1997	Utah	W 119–112 OT				Bradley Center; 13,682	17–16
34	January 10, 1997	Chicago	L 101–116				Bradley Center; 18,717	17–17
35	January 12, 1997	Golden State	W 111–93				Bradley Center; 13,289	18–17
36	January 17, 1997	@ Chicago	L 73–100				United Center; 23,898	18–18
37	January 18, 1997	@ Atlanta	L 71–94				Omni Coliseum; 16,378	18–19
38	January 20, 1997	@ Philadelphia	W 114–104				CoreStates Center; 13,223	19–19

February: 0–0 (home: 0–0; road: 0–0)

Game	Date	Team	Score	High points	High rebounds	High assists	Location Attendance	Record

March: 0–0 (home: 0–0; road: 0–0)

Game	Date	Team	Score	High points	High rebounds	High assists	Location Attendance	Record

April: 0–0 (home: 0–0; road: 0–0)

Game	Date	Team	Score	High points	High rebounds	High assists	Location Attendance	Record

1996–97 schedule

== Player statistics ==
Legend
GP	Games played	GS	Games started	MPG	Minutes per game
FG%	Field-goal percentage	3P%	3-point field-goal percentage	FT%	Free-throw percentage
RPG	Rebounds per game	APG	Assists per game	SPG	Steals per game
BPG	Blocks per game	PPG	Points per game

Player	GP	GS	MPG	FG%	3FG%	FT%	RPG	APG	SPG	BPG	PPG
Ray Allen	82	81	30.9	.430	.393	.823	4.0	2.6	0.9	0.1	13.4
Vin Baker	78	78	40.5	.505	.278	.687	10.3	2.7	1.0	1.4	21.0
Chucky Brown	60	1	11.2	.508	.167	.661	2.2	0.4	0.2	0.3	2.8
Jimmy Carruth	4	0	5.3	.667	.000	1.000	1.0	0.0	0.0	0.5	1.3
Sherman Douglas	79	79	29.3	.502	.333	.667	2.4	5.4	1.0	0.1	9.7
Acie Earl	9	0	4.8	.348	.000	.714	1.2	0.2	0.3	0.1	2.9
Armen Gilliam	80	25	25.6	.471	.000	.768	6.2	0.7	0.8	0.5	8.6
Darrin Hancock	9	0	4.3	.333	.000	.000	0.6	0.4	0.2	0.0	0.4
Andrew Lang	52	52	23.0	.464	.000	.721	5.3	0.5	0.5	0.9	5.3
Cuonzo Martin	3	0	4.3	.000	.000	.000	0.3	0.3	0.0	0.0	0.0
Johnny Newman	82	4	25.1	.450	.347	.765	2.3	1.4	0.9	0.2	8.7
Elliot Perry	82	3	19.5	.474	.358	.745	1.5	3.0	1.2	0.0	6.9
Shawn Respert	14	0	5.9	.316	.111	1.000	0.5	0.6	0.0	0.0	1.4
Glenn Robinson	80	79	38.9	.465	.350	.791	6.3	3.1	1.3	0.9	21.1
Keith Tower	5	1	14.4	.375	.000	.125	1.8	0.2	0.4	0.2	1.4
Joe Wolf	56	7	9.4	.449	.143	.737	2.0	0.4	0.3	0.2	1.7
David Wood	46	0	5.2	.526	.333	.667	0.6	0.3	0.2	0.1	1.2

== Awards and records ==
- Vin Baker, All-NBA Third Team
- Ray Allen, NBA All-Rookie Team 2nd Team

== Transactions ==
=== Trades ===
June 26, 1996
To Milwaukee Bucks----
- Ray Allen
To Minnesota Timberwolves----
- Stephon Marbury
September 25, 1996
To Milwaukee Bucks----
- Elliot Perry
To Phoenix Suns----
- Marty Conlon
December 4, 1996
To Milwaukee Bucks----
- Chucky Brown
To Phoenix Suns----
- Darrin Hancock
February 20, 1997
To Milwaukee Bucks----
- Acie Earl
To Toronto Raptors----
- Shawn Respert

=== Free agents ===
Player	Signed	Former team
Armen Gilliam	August 6, 1996	New Jersey Nets
Joe Wolf	September 3, 1996	Orlando Magic
Darrin Hancock	October 3, 1996	Charlotte Hornets
Keith Tower	October 3, 1996	Los Angeles Clippers
David Wood	October 3, 1996	Dallas Mavericks

Player transactions citation:

== See also ==
- 1996-97 NBA season
