= 1996–97 Detroit Pistons season =

NBA team season

- Head coach: Doug Collins
- General manager: Rick Sund
- Owner: Bill Davidson
- Arena: The Palace of Auburn Hills

Results
- Record: 54–28 (.659)
- Place: Division: 3rd (Central); Conference: 5th (Eastern)
- Playoff finish: First round (lost to Hawks 2–3)
- Stats at Basketball Reference

Local media
- Television: WKBD-TV; PASS Sports
- Radio: WDFN

The 1996–97 Detroit Pistons season was the 49th season for the Detroit Pistons in the National Basketball Association, and their 40th season in Detroit, Michigan.

== Season summary ==
=== Off-season ===
During the off-season, the Pistons acquired Stacey Augmon and Grant Long from the Atlanta Hawks, and re-signed free agent and former "Bad Boy" Rick Mahorn, who was a member of the championship team that defeated the Los Angeles Lakers in the 1989 NBA Finals. The team also signed three-point specialist Kenny Smith, who won two NBA championships with the Houston Rockets, but was released to free agency in November after nine games.

For the season, the Pistons redesigned their primary logo, replacing their traditional blue and red colors with teal, burgundy, black, silver and golden yellow to their color scheme of white. The team's primary logo featured a black and silver horse head with a flaming mane in burgundy and golden yellow, above the team name "Pistons" in white letters with teal shadows, and flaming tailpipes surrounded by a black outline; the flaming horse head and team name are in front of a burgundy basketball with silver seams, surrounded by a teal circle with a silver outline featuring the city name "Detroit" in white letters.

The team also redesigned their home and road uniforms, which featured the flaming horse head along with the team name on the front of their jerseys. The white home uniforms featured a teal, golden yellow and burgundy trim, and teal side panels with golden yellow and burgundy outlines on their jerseys and shorts, while the road uniforms were changed from blue to teal, and featured a black, golden yellow and burgundy trim, and black side panels.

The team's new primary logo, and new uniforms would both remain in use until 2001, while the basic design of the logo would last until 2005.

=== Regular season ===
The Pistons got off to a fast start by winning ten of their first eleven games of the regular season, which included a six-game winning streak in November. The team got off to a 20–4 start to the season, and later on held a 34–12 record at the All-Star break. At mid-season, the Pistons traded Augmon to the Portland Trail Blazers in exchange for Aaron McKie. The Pistons posted another six-game winning streak in February, holding a 40–13 record as of February 23, 1997. However, despite their successful start, the team posted a 20–16 record after the All-Star break, losing six of their final nine games of the season. The Pistons finished in third place in the Central Division with a 54–28 record, and earned the fifth seed in the Eastern Conference; it was also the team's first 50-win season since the 1990–91 season, and would be their last until the 2001–02 season.

Grant Hill averaged 21.4 points, 9.0 rebounds, 7.3 assists and 1.8 steals per game, and was named to the All-NBA First Team, while Joe Dumars averaged 14.7 points and 4.0 assists per game, and contributed 166 three-point field goals, and Lindsey Hunter showed improvement averaging 14.2 points and 1.6 steals per game, along with 166 three-point field goals; despite being the starting point guard, Hunter only contributed just 1.9 assists per game. In addition, Otis Thorpe provided the team with 13.1 points and 7.9 rebounds per game, while sixth man Terry Mills contributed 10.8 points and 4.3 rebounds per game, and led the Pistons with 175 three-point field goals off the bench. Meanwhile, McKie contributed 6.3 points per game in 42 games after the trade, second-year center Theo Ratliff averaged 5.8 points, 3.4 rebounds and 1.5 blocks per game, Long provided with 5.0 points and 3.4 rebounds per game, and Michael Curry contributed 3.9 points per game.

During the NBA All-Star weekend at the Gund Arena in Cleveland, Ohio, Hill and Dumars were both selected for the 1997 NBA All-Star Game, as members of the Eastern Conference All-Star team, while head coach Doug Collins was selected to coach the Eastern Conference; it was Dumars' sixth and final All-Star appearance. Meanwhile, Mills participated in the NBA Three-Point Shootout. Hill also finished in third place in Most Valuable Player voting, behind Karl Malone of the Utah Jazz, and Michael Jordan of the Chicago Bulls; Dumars finished tied in sixth place in Defensive Player of the Year voting, while Hunter finished in seventh place in Most Improved Player voting, Mills finished in fourth place in Sixth Man of the Year voting, and Collins finished in fifth place in Coach of the Year voting.

The Pistons finished sixth in the NBA in home-game attendance, with an attendance of 784,234 at The Palace of Auburn Hills during the regular season.

=== NBA playoffs ===
In the Eastern Conference First Round of the 1997 NBA playoffs, the Pistons faced off against the 4th–seeded Atlanta Hawks, who were led by the quartet of All-Star center, and Defensive Player of the Year, Dikembe Mutombo, All-Star forward Christian Laettner, Steve Smith and Mookie Blaylock. The Pistons lost Game 1 to the Hawks on the road, 89–75 at the Omni Coliseum, but managed to win the next two games, which included a Game 3 win over the Hawks at home, 99–91 at The Palace of Auburn Hills to take a 2–1 series lead. However, the Pistons lost the next two games, including a Game 5 loss to the Hawks at the Omni Coliseum, 84–79, thus losing in a hard-fought five-game series.

=== Aftermath ===
Following the season, Thorpe was traded to the Vancouver Grizzlies after feuding with Collins during the regular season, while Mills signed as a free agent with the Miami Heat, and Curry signed with the Milwaukee Bucks.

== Draft picks ==
Round	Pick	Player	Position	Nationality	College
1	26	Jerome Williams	PF	United States	Georgetown

== Roster ==
1996–97 Detroit Pistons roster
Players

Pos.	No.	Player	Height	Weight	DOB	From
G	3	Randolph Childress	6 ft 2 in (1.88 m)	188 lb (85 kg)	1972–09–21	Wake Forest
G	12	Michael Curry	6 ft 5 in (1.96 m)	210 lb (95 kg)	1968–08–22	Georgia Southern
G	4	Joe Dumars	6 ft 3 in (1.91 m)	190 lb (86 kg)	1963–05–24	McNeese State
G	9	Litterial Green	6 ft 1 in (1.85 m)	185 lb (84 kg)	1970–03–07	Georgia
F	33	Grant Hill	6 ft 8 in (2.03 m)	225 lb (102 kg)	1972–10–05	Duke
G	1	Lindsey Hunter	6 ft 2 in (1.88 m)	170 lb (77 kg)	1970–12–03	Jackson State
F	43	Grant Long	6 ft 8 in (2.03 m)	225 lb (102 kg)	1966–03–12	Eastern Michigan
C	44	Rick Mahorn	6 ft 10 in (2.08 m)	240 lb (109 kg)	1958–09–21	Hampton
G	23	Aaron McKie	6 ft 5 in (1.96 m)	209 lb (95 kg)	1972–10–02	Temple
F	6	Terry Mills	6 ft 10 in (2.08 m)	230 lb (104 kg)	1967–12–21	Michigan
C	42	Theo Ratliff	6 ft 10 in (2.08 m)	225 lb (102 kg)	1973–04–17	Wyoming
F	52	Don Reid	6 ft 8 in (2.03 m)	250 lb (113 kg)	1973–12–30	Georgetown
C	50	Otis Thorpe	6 ft 9 in (2.06 m)	225 lb (102 kg)	1962–08–05	Providence
F	13	Jerome Williams	6 ft 9 in (2.06 m)	206 lb (93 kg)	1973–05–10	Georgetown

Coaches
Head coach
- Doug Collins
Assistant(s)
- Johnny Bach
- Alvin Gentry
- John Hammond
- Brian James
- Mike Abdenour (trainer)

Legend
- (DP) Unsigned draft pick
- (FA) Free agent
- (S) Suspended
- Injured

Roster
Updated: February 18, 1997

== Regular season ==
=== Season standings ===
Central Division	W	L	PCT	GB	Home	Road	Div
y-Chicago Bulls	69	13	.841	–	39–2	30–11	24–4
x-Atlanta Hawks	56	26	.683	13	36–5	20–21	17–11
x-Detroit Pistons	54	28	.659	15	30–11	24–17	17–11
x-Charlotte Hornets	54	28	.659	15	30–11	24–17	14–14
Cleveland Cavaliers	42	40	.512	27	25–16	17–24	13–15
Indiana Pacers	39	43	.476	30	21–20	18–23	11–17
Milwaukee Bucks	33	49	.402	36	20–21	13–28	10–18
Toronto Raptors	30	52	.366	39	18–23	12–29	6–22

1996–97 NBA East standings
#	Eastern Conference				
#	Team	W	L	PCT	GB
1	z-Chicago Bulls	69	13	.841	–
2	y-Miami Heat	61	21	.744	8
3	x-New York Knicks	57	25	.695	12
4	x-Atlanta Hawks	56	26	.683	13
5	x-Detroit Pistons	54	28	.659	15
6	x-Charlotte Hornets	54	28	.659	15
7	x-Orlando Magic	45	37	.549	24
8	x-Washington Bullets	44	38	.537	25
9	Cleveland Cavaliers	42	40	.512	27
10	Indiana Pacers	39	43	.476	30
11	Milwaukee Bucks	33	49	.402	36
12	Toronto Raptors	30	52	.366	39
13	New Jersey Nets	26	56	.317	43
14	Philadelphia 76ers	22	60	.268	47
15	Boston Celtics	15	67	.183	54

z - clinched division title
y - clinched division title
x - clinched playoff spot

=== Game log ===
1996–97 game log
Total: 54-28 (Home: 30–11; Road: 24–17)
November: 11–3 (home: 6–2; road: 5–1)

Game	Date	Team	Score	High points	High rebounds	High assists	Location Attendance	Record
1	November 1	Indiana	W 95–89	Joe Dumars (27)	Grant Hill (8)	Grant Hill (5)	The Palace Of Auburn Hills; 21,454	1–0
2	November 2	@ Atlanta	W 90–78	Grant Hill (22)	Grant Hill (15)	Grant Hill (9)	Omni Coliseum; 16,378	2–0
3	November 5	@ Philadelphia	W 83–81	Grant Hill (22)	Grant Hill (14)	Grant Hill (9)	CoreStates Spectrum; 12,713	3–0
4	November 6	Dallas	W 103–84	Joe Dumars (18)	Otis Thorpe (13)	Joe Dumars (8)	The Palace Of Auburn Hills; 14,473	4–0
5	November 8	Chicago	L 80–98	Joe Dumars (22)	3 players tied (6)	Grant Hill (5)	The Palace Of Auburn Hills; 21,454	4–1
6	November 12	@ Washington	W 92–79	Grant Hill (24)	Grant Long (11)	Grant Hill (7)	US Airways Arena; 15,111	5–1
7	November 13	Denver	W 95–94 (OT)	Grant Hill (27)	Otis Thorpe (14)	Joe Dumars (5)	The Palace Of Auburn Hills; 13,717	6–1
8	November 15	Washington	W 95–84	Grant Hill (27)	Otis Thorpe (12)	Joe Dumars (5)	The Palace Of Auburn Hills; 21,454	7–1
9	November 16	@ Cleveland	W 102–98	Grant Hill (27)	Thorpe & Dumars (6)	Grant Hill (7)	Gund Arena; 17,808	8–1
10	November 20	@ Boston	W 108–83	Grant Hill (23)	4 players tied (5)	Joe Dumars (9)	FleetCenter; 14,291	9–1
11	November 21	New Jersey	W 96–88	Joe Dumars (23)	Hill & Thorpe (8)	Grant Hill (9)	The Palace Of Auburn Hills; 14,753	10–1
12	November 23	@ Charlotte	L 85–93	Joe Dumars (20)	Otis Thorpe (13)	Joe Dumars (6)	Charlotte Coliseum; 24,042	10–2
13	November 27	Vancouver	W 87–78	Lindsey Hunter (24)	Otis Thorpe (14)	Grant Hill (8)	The Palace Of Auburn Hills; 15,195	11–2
14	November 29	L.A. Lakers	L 76–84	Grant Hill (20)	Otis Thorpe (12)	Grant Hill (7)	The Palace Of Auburn Hills; 21,454	11–3

December: 11–4 (home: 7–1; road: 4–3)

Game	Date	Team	Score	High points	High rebounds	High assists	Location Attendance	Record
15	December 1	Sacramento	W 95–66	Grant Hill (23)	Grant Hill (14)	Joe Dumars (7)	The Palace Of Auburn Hills; 14,063	12–3
16	December 4	Atlanta	W 100–90	Terry Mills (25)	Grant Hill (11)	Grant Hill (8)	The Palace Of Auburn Hills; 14,574	13–3
17	December 6	Cleveland	W 93–81	Terry Mills (23)	Otis Thorpe (6)	Terry Mills (9)	The Palace Of Auburn Hills; 17,806	14–3
18	December 7	@ New Jersey	W 95–69	Lindsey Hunter (17)	Theo Ratliff (8)	Grant Hill (6)	Continental Airlines Arena; 12,018	15–3
19	December 10	@ Milwaukee	W 93–85	Joe Dumars (29)	Thorpe & Long (5)	Grant Hill (9)	Bradley Center; 13,202	16–3
20	December 12	@ Houston	L 96–115	Lindsey Hunter (19)	Theo Ratliff (8)	Grant Hill (6)	The Summit; 16,285	16–4
21	December 15	Boston	W 99–89	Grant Hill (25)	Grant Hill (11)	Grant Hill (8)	The Palace Of Auburn Hills; 18,545	17–4
22	December 16	@ Toronto	W 98–92	Grant Hill (27)	Grant Hill (12)	Grant Hill (5)	SkyDome; 16,546	18–4
23	December 18	New York	W 112–78	Lindsey Hunter (28)	Grant Hill (10)	Grant Hill (11)	The Palace Of Auburn Hills; 21,454	19–4
24	December 20	@ Indiana	W 84–75	Lindsey Hunter (20)	Otis Thorpe (15)	Grant Hill (6)	Market Square Arena; 16,110	20–4
25	December 21	@ New York	L 92–95	Grant Hill (25)	Hill & Thorpe (8)	4 players tied (4)	Madison Square Garden; 19,763	20–5
26	December 25	@ Chicago	L 83–95	Grant Hill (27)	Grant Long (11)	Joe Dumars (3)	United Center; 23,744	20–6
27	December 26	Indiana	L 89–95 (OT)	Grant Hill (19)	Grant Hill (16)	Grant Hill (7)	The Palace Of Auburn Hills; 21,454	20–7
28	December 28	Charlotte	W 97–75	Grant Hill (29)	Otis Thorpe (15)	Grant Hill (6)	The Palace Of Auburn Hills; 21,454	21–7
29	December 30	Orlando	W 97–85	Grant Hill (25)	Otis Thorpe (9)	Grant Hill (8)	The Palace Of Auburn Hills; 21,454	22–7

January: 10–4 (home: 6–1; road: 4–3)

Game	Date	Team	Score	High points	High rebounds	High assists	Location Attendance	Record
30	January 2	Boston	W 99–87	Grant Hill (20)	Grant Hill (8)	Grant Hill (8)	The Palace Of Auburn Hills; 18,208	23–7
31	January 4	Toronto	W 118–74	Michael Curry (17)	Grant Hill (8)	Hill & Dumars (7)	The Palace Of Auburn Hills; 21,454	24–7
32	January 7	Milwaukee	L 76–86	Grant Hill (24)	Otis Thorpe (10)	Grant Hill (9)	The Palace Of Auburn Hills; 17,224	24–8
33	January 10	San Antonio	W 84–78	Grant Hill (19)	Otis Thorpe (12)	Grant Hill (7)	The Palace Of Auburn Hills; 19,733	25–8
34	January 11	Utah	W 87–77	Hunter & Hill (19)	Hill & Thorpe (11)	Grant Hill (7)	The Palace Of Auburn Hills; 21,454	26–8
35	January 14	@ Portland	L 86–95	Terry Mills (24)	Grant Hill (10)	Grant Hill (9)	Rose Garden Arena; 20,064	26–9
36	January 15	@ Vancouver	W 103–79	Grant Hill (31)	Grant Hill (11)	Grant Hill (9)	General Motors Place; 16,059	27–9
37	January 18	@ L.A. Lakers	W 100–97 (2OT)	Grant Hill (34)	Grant Hill (15)	Grant Hill (14)	Great Western Forum; 17,505	28–9
38	January 20	@ Phoenix	L 86–89	Lindsey Hunter (23)	Otis Thorpe (13)	Grant Hill (11)	America West Arena; 19,023	28–10
39	January 22	@ Sacramento	L 92–97	Grant Hill (33)	Otis Thorpe (13)	Grant Hill (4)	ARCO Arena; 17,317	28–11
40	January 23	@ Golden State	W 94–79	Terry Mills (22)	Terry Mills (11)	Joe Dumars (8)	San Jose Arena; 16,187	29–11
41	January 25	Philadelphia	W 104–95	Grant Hill (21)	Grant Hill (16)	Grant Hill (10)	The Palace Of Auburn Hills; 21,454	30–11
42	January 28	@ Milwaukee	W 93–84	Grant Hill (22)	Otis Thorpe (9)	Joe Dumars (8)	Bradley Center; 14,487	31–11
43	January 29	Portland	W 98–89	Grant Hill (27)	Otis Thorpe (12)	Joe Dumars (6)	The Palace Of Auburn Hills; 20,128	32–11

February: 10–3 (home: 5–1; road: 5–2)

Game	Date	Team	Score	High points	High rebounds	High assists	Location Attendance	Record
44	February 1	@ New Jersey	W 90–75	Otis Thorpe (23)	Grant Hill (11)	Grant Hill (11)	Continental Airlines Arena; 20,049	33–11
45	February 2	Phoenix	L 97–106	Otis Thorpe (27)	Grant Hill (8)	Joe Dumars (7)	The Palace Of Auburn Hills; 21,454	33–12
46	February 6	Houston	W 96–87	Hill & Mills (16)	Otis Thorpe (12)	Grant Hill (8)	The Palace Of Auburn Hills; 21,454	34–12
All-Star Break
47	February 11	@ Miami	L 91–104	Grant Hill (17)	Hill & Thorpe (7)	Hill & Dumars (5)	Miami Arena; 15,200	34–13
48	February 12	Orlando	W 96–87	Grant Hill (31)	Grant Hill (10)	Grant Hill (10)	The Palace Of Auburn Hills; 21,454	35–13
49	February 14	@ Charlotte	W 109–103	Grant Hill (29)	Terry Mills (11)	Joe Dumars (6)	Charlotte Coliseum; 24,042	36–13
50	February 16	@ Toronto	W 92–89	Grant Hill (23)	Grant Hill (18)	Joe Dumars (7)	Maple Leaf Gardens; 15,492	37–13
51	February 19	Washington	W 100–85	Lindsey Hunter (25)	Terry Mills (9)	Hill & Dumars (7)	The Palace Of Auburn Hills; 21,454	38–13
52	February 21	New Jersey	W 98–84	Grant Hill (19)	Grant Hill (9)	Grant Hill (13)	The Palace Of Auburn Hills; 21,454	39–13
53	February 23	@ Washington	W 85–79	Aaron McKie (16)	Terry Mills (14)	Hill & Dumars (5)	US Airways Arena; 18,756	40–13
54	February 24	@ Orlando	L 84–93	Theo Ratliff (17)	Grant Hill (8)	Grant Hill (6)	Orlando Arena; 17,248	40–14
55	February 26	Golden State	W 117–84	Hunter & Mills (21)	Grant Hill (7)	Grant Hill (10)	The Palace Of Auburn Hills; 21,454	41–14
56	February 28	@ Boston	W 106–100 (OT)	Grant Hill (29)	Grant Hill (12)	Grant Hill (12)	FleetCenter; 18,264	42–14

March: 7–8 (home: 4–3; road: 3–5)

Game	Date	Team	Score	High points	High rebounds	High assists	Location Attendance	Record
57	March 2	Atlanta	W 82–75	Grant Hill (23)	Otis Thorpe (12)	Grant Hill (10)	The Palace Of Auburn Hills; 21,454	43–14
58	March 4	Miami	L 99–108	Lindsey Hunter (26)	Otis Thorpe (9)	Grant Hill (9)	The Palace Of Auburn Hills; 21,454	43–15
59	March 5	@ Minnesota	W 92–88	Lindsey Hunter (21)	Otis Thorpe (9)	Aaron McKie (5)	Target Center; 17,003	44–15
60	March 7	@ Utah	L 88–95	Grant Hill (29)	Otis Thorpe (9)	Grant Hill (8)	Delta Center; 19,911	44–16
61	March 8	@ L.A. Clippers	W 91–85	Joe Dumars (23)	Grant Hill (10)	Grant Hill (8)	Los Angeles Memorial Sports Arena; 16,021	45–16
62	March 11	@ Seattle	L 80–93	Grant Hill (18)	Terry Mills (7)	Grant Hill (8)	KeyArena at Seattle Center; 17,072	45–17
63	March 13	@ Denver	W 102–82	Grant Hill (28)	Grant Hill (14)	Grant Hill (7)	McNichols Sports Arena; 13,813	46–17
64	March 16	Seattle	W 86–83	Terry Mills (25)	Grant Hill (11)	Joe Dumars (7)	The Palace Of Auburn Hills; 21,454	47–17
65	March 17	@ Cleveland	L 82–85	Otis Thorpe (20)	Grant Hill (11)	Grant Hill (7)	Gund Arena; 17,648	47–18
66	March 19	Toronto	L 97–99	Otis Thorpe (21)	Otis Thorpe (6)	Hill & Dumars (8)	The Palace Of Auburn Hills; 21,454	47–19
67	March 21	Minnesota	W 112–98	Grant Hill (22)	Grant Hill (11)	Grant Hill (10)	The Palace Of Auburn Hills; 21,454	48–19
68	March 22	@ Chicago	L 88–103	Grant Hill (16)	Don Reid (8)	Grant Hill (8)	United Center; 23,896	48–20
69	March 26	@ New York	L 94–105	Lindsey Hunter (19)	Grant Hill (9)	Joe Dumars (6)	Madison Square Garden; 19,763	48–21
70	March 28	L.A. Clippers	W 113–85	Joe Dumars (26)	Grant Hill (10)	Joe Dumars (8)	The Palace Of Auburn Hills; 21,454	49–21
71	March 30	Philadelphia	L 92–96	Otis Thorpe (24)	Grant Hill (16)	Grant Hill (10)	The Palace Of Auburn Hills; 21,454	49–22

April: 5–6 (home: 2–3; road: 3–3)

Game	Date	Team	Score	High points	High rebounds	High assists	Location Attendance	Record
72	April 1	@ Dallas	W 100–82	Grant Hill (35)	Grant Hill (18)	Grant Hill (6)	Reunion Arena; 15,291	50–22
73	April 2	@ San Antonio	W 99–92	Grant Hill (31)	Grant Hill (11)	Grant Hill (10)	Alamodome; 14,489	51–22
74	April 4	@ Atlanta	L 89–103	Grant Hill (22)	Grant Hill (12)	Grant Hill (12)	Omni Coliseum; 16,378	51–23
75	April 7	Miami	L 88–94	Otis Thorpe (23)	Otis Thorpe (14)	Grant Hill (7)	The Palace Of Auburn Hills; 21,454	51–24
76	April 10	@ Miami	L 83–93	Terry Mills (24)	Grant Hill (9)	Grant Hill (8)	Miami Arena; 15,200	51–25
77	April 11	Charlotte	L 85–93	Joe Dumars (21)	Grant Hill (14)	Grant Hill (10)	The Palace Of Auburn Hills; 21,454	51–26
78	April 13	Chicago	W 108–91	Terry Mills (29)	Grant Hill (12)	Grant Hill (10)	The Palace Of Auburn Hills; 21,454	52–26
79	April 14	@ Orlando	L 91–100	Lindsey Hunter (17)	Grant Hill (15)	Grant Hill (13)	Orlando Arena; 17,248	52–27
80	April 16	Milwaukee	W 92–85	Theo Ratliff (25)	Ratliff & McKie (12)	Aaron McKie (8)	The Palace Of Auburn Hills; 21,454	53–27
81	April 18	Cleveland	L 75–82	Hill & Mills (14)	Grant Hill (6)	Grant Hill (7)	The Palace Of Auburn Hills; 21,454	53–28
82	April 20	@ Indiana	W 124–120 (OT)	Grant Hill (38)	Aaron McKie (8)	McKie & Hill (7)	Market Square Arena; 16,705	54–28

1996–97 schedule

== Playoffs ==
1997 playoff game log
First Round: 2–3 (home: 1–1; road: 1–2)

Game	Date	Team	Score	High points	High rebounds	High assists	Location Attendance	Series
1	April 25	@ Atlanta	L 75–89	Grant Hill (20)	Grant Hill (14)	Grant Hill (7)	Omni Coliseum; 15,795	0–1
2	April 27	@ Atlanta	W 93–80	Grant Hill (25)	Otis Thorpe (8)	Grant Hill (3)	Omni Coliseum; 16,378	1–1
3	April 29	Atlanta	W 99–91	Lindsey Hunter (26)	Terry Mills (7)	Grant Hill (8)	The Palace of Auburn Hills; 20,059	2–1
4	May 2	Atlanta	L 82–94	Grant Hill (28)	Terry Mills (10)	three players tied (3)	The Palace of Auburn Hills; 21,454	2–2
5	May 4	@ Atlanta	L 79–84	Grant Hill (21)	Lindsey Hunter (9)	Grant Hill (6)	Omni Coliseum; 16,378	2–3

1997 schedule

== Player statistics ==
Legend
GP	Games played	GS	Games started	MPG	Minutes per game
FG%	Field-goal percentage	3P%	3-point field-goal percentage	FT%	Free-throw percentage
RPG	Rebounds per game	APG	Assists per game	SPG	Steals per game
BPG	Blocks per game	PPG	Points per game

=== Regular season ===
Player	GP	GS	MPG	FG%	3P%	FT%	RPG	APG	SPG	BPG	PPG
Stacey Augmon	20	3	14.6	.403	—	.683	2.5	0.8	0.5	0.5	4.5
Randolph Childress	4	0	7.5	.400	.667	—	0.3	0.5	0.5	0.0	2.5
Michael Curry	81	2	15.0	.448	.299	.898	1.5	0.5	0.4	0.1	3.9
Joe Dumars	79	79	37.0	.440	.432	.867	2.4	4.0	0.7	0.0	14.7
Litterial Green	45	0	6.9	.469	.000	.638	0.5	0.9	0.4	0.0	2.0
Grant Hill	80	80	39.3	.496	.303	.711	9.0	7.3	1.8	0.6	21.4
Lindsey Hunter	82	76	36.9	.404	.355	.778	2.8	1.9	1.6	0.3	14.2
Grant Long	65	24	17.9	.447	.362	.750	3.4	0.6	0.7	0.1	5.0
Rick Mahorn	22	7	9.9	.370	.000	.727	2.4	0.3	0.2	0.1	2.5
Aaron McKie	42	3	20.2	.464	.375	.836	3.0	1.8	1.0	0.2	6.3
Terry Mills	79	5	25.3	.444	.422	.829	4.8	1.3	0.4	0.3	10.8
Theo Ratliff	76	38	17.0	.531	—	.698	3.4	0.2	0.4	1.5	5.8
Don Reid	47	14	9.8	.482	.000	.750	2.1	0.3	0.3	0.3	2.8
Kenny Smith	9	0	7.1	.400	.500	1.000	0.6	1.1	0.1	0.0	2.6
Otis Thorpe	79	79	33.7	.532	.000	.653	7.9	1.7	0.7	0.2	13.1
Jerome Williams	33	0	5.4	.392	—	.529	1.5	0.2	0.4	0.0	1.5

=== Playoffs ===
Player	GP	GS	MPG	FG%	3P%	FT%	RPG	APG	SPG	BPG	PPG
Grant Hill	5	5	40.6	.437	—	.718	6.8	5.4	0.8	1.0	23.6
Lindsey Hunter	5	5	40.2	.439	.414	.714	3.6	1.2	1.2	0.2	15.0
Joe Dumars	5	5	42.8	.361	.261	.950	1.8	2.0	1.0	0.0	13.8
Terry Mills	5	4	39.2	.436	.346	.500	7.0	1.4	1.2	0.0	11.8
Otis Thorpe	5	5	30.4	.512	—	.778	6.4	0.8	0.4	0.0	9.8
Grant Long	5	0	17.2	.444	.000	.818	2.2	0.6	0.8	0.0	5.0
Jerome Williams	1	0	5.0	1.000	—	—	3.0	0.0	1.0	0.0	4.0
Don Reid	1	0	3.0	—	—	1.000	1.0	0.0	0.0	0.0	4.0
Aaron McKie	5	0	19.4	.350	.200	—	2.0	2.0	1.2	0.4	3.0
Theo Ratliff	3	0	6.0	.750	—	.500	1.3	0.3	0.3	1.3	2.7
Michael Curry	2	0	3.5	.500	—	.000	0.5	0.0	0.0	0.0	1.0
Rick Mahorn	2	1	9.0	.000	—	—	0.5	0.0	0.0	0.0	0.0

Player statistics citation:

== Awards and records ==
- Grant Hill, All-NBA First Team

== Transactions ==
- July 15, 1996: Signed Michael Curry; released Mark West and Lou Roe
- July 15, 1996: Traded a 1997 2nd Round Draft Pick (which became Alain Digbeu), two 1999 1st Round Draft Picks (Cal Bowdler and Dion Glover) and one 1999 2nd Round Draft Pick (Lari Ketner) to the Atlanta Hawks for Stacey Augmon and Grant Long
- August 5, 1996: Signed Rick Mahorn
- August 30, 1996: Signed Litterial Green
- September 17, 1996: Signed Kenny Smith
- November 23, 1996: Waived Kenny Smith
- January 24, 1997: Acquired Randolph Childress, Reggie Jordan and Aaron McKie from the Portland Trail Blazers for Stacey Augmon
- February 18, 1997: Waived Reggie Jordan

Player transactions citation:

== See also ==
- 1996-97 NBA season
