= 1996–97 Miami Heat season =

NBA professional basketball team season

- Division champions
- Head coach: Pat Riley
- President: Pat Riley
- General manager: Randy Pfund
- Owner: Micky Arison
- Arena: Miami Arena

Results
- Record: 61–21 (.744)
- Place: Division: 1st (Atlantic); Conference: 2nd (Eastern)
- Playoff finish: Eastern Conference finals (lost to Bulls 1–4)
- Stats at Basketball Reference

Local media
- Television: WBFS-TV; Sunshine Network
- Radio: WIOD

The 1996–97 Miami Heat season was the ninth season for the Miami Heat in the National Basketball Association.

== Season summary ==
=== Off-season ===
During the off-season, the Heat signed free agents, All-Star guard and three-point specialist Dan Majerle, P.J. Brown, and Isaac Austin. The team also signed All-Star forward Juwan Howard to a 7-year $100 million contract, but was voided by the league claiming that the Heat exceeded their salary cap; Howard then quickly re-signed with the Washington Bullets.

=== Regular season ===
With the addition of Majerle, Brown and Austin, the Heat got off to a 5–4 start to the regular season, but then posted a nine-game winning streak between November and December afterwards. The team posted a six-game winning streak in January, and later on held a 36–12 record at the All-Star break. At mid-season, the team traded second-year guard Sasha Danilovic, and second-year forward Kurt Thomas to the Dallas Mavericks in exchange for Jamal Mashburn. The Heat posted an 11-game winning streak between January and February, posted an eight-game winning streak in March, and another six-game winning streak in April. The Heat won their first Division title by finishing in first place in the Atlantic Division with a 61–21 record, which stood as the franchise mark until the 2012–13 season, and earned the second seed in the Eastern Conference; the team also posted the league's best road record at 32–9, while posting a 29–12 home record at the Miami Arena. Head coach Pat Riley was named the NBA Coach of the Year for the third time, after leading the Heat to a 19-game improvement over the previous season. The Heat had the best team defensive rating in the NBA.

Tim Hardaway averaged 20.3 points, 8.6 assists and 1.9 steals per game, and led the Heat with 203 three-point field goals, and was named to the All-NBA First Team, while Alonzo Mourning averaged 19.8 points, 9.9 rebounds and 2.9 blocks per game, and Mashburn provided the team with 13.4 points, 5.6 rebounds, 3.5 assists and 1.3 steals per game in 32 games after the trade. In addition, second-year guard Voshon Lenard showed improvement becoming the team's starting shooting guard at mid-season, averaging 12.3 points per game and contributing 183 three-point field goals, while Majerle contributed 10.8 points and 1.5 steals per game, but only played just 36 games due to a back injury, and Brown provided with 9.5 points and 8.4 rebounds per game, and was named to the NBA All-Defensive Second Team. Off the bench, Austin, who played a role as backup center, averaged 9.7 points and 5.8 rebounds per game, and was named the NBA Most Improved Player of the Year, and Keith Askins contributed 4.9 points and 3.5 rebounds per game.

During the NBA All-Star weekend at the Gund Arena in Cleveland, Ohio, Hardaway and Mourning were both selected for the 1997 NBA All-Star Game, as members of the Eastern Conference All-Star team; however, Mourning did not participate due to a foot injury, in which he missed 16 games this season. Hardaway also finished in fourth place in Most Valuable Player voting, while Mourning finished in twelfth place; Lenard finished in fourth place in Most Improved Player voting, while Hardaway finished tied in twelfth place, and Austin finished tied in seventh place in Sixth Man of the Year voting.

The Heat finished 25th in the NBA in home-game attendance, with an attendance of 615,160 at the Miami Arena during the regular season, which was the fifth-lowest in the league.

=== NBA playoffs ===
In the Eastern Conference First Round of the 1997 NBA playoffs, the Heat faced off against their in-state rivals, the 7th–seeded Orlando Magic, a team that featured All-Star guard Penny Hardaway, former Heat center Rony Seikaly, and Nick Anderson. The Heat won their first two home games at the Miami Arena, which included a 35-point margin win over the Magic in Game 1, 99–64. However, the Heat lost the next two games on the road, including a Game 4 loss to the Magic at the Orlando Arena, 99–91. With the series tied at 2–2, the Heat won Game 5 over the Magic at the Miami Arena, 91–83 to win in a hard-fought five-game series; the team won their first ever NBA playoff series in franchise history.

In the Eastern Conference Semi-finals, the Heat faced off against the 3rd–seeded New York Knicks, who were led by All-Star center Patrick Ewing, Allan Houston, and Sixth Man of the Year, John Starks; Riley had previously served as head coach of the Knicks from 1991 to 1995. With the series tied at 1–1, the Heat lost the next two games to the Knicks on the road, including a Game 4 loss at Madison Square Garden by a score of 89–76, as the Knicks took a 3–1 series lead.

One notable incident of the series occurred in Game 5 at the Miami Arena, in which the Heat defeated the Knicks, 96–81. During the fourth quarter, a brawl erupted when Brown picked up Knicks guard Charlie Ward, and threw him off the court, which prompted several Knicks players to come off the bench during the altercation. Five Knicks players were suspended, with four of them receiving automatic one-game suspensions for leaving the bench during an altercation, while Brown was suspended for two games. Despite the absence of Brown, the Heat won Game 6 over the Knicks at Madison Square Garden, 95–90 to even the series, and then won Game 7 at the Miami Arena, 101–90, in which Hardaway scored 38 points; the Heat defeated the Knicks in a hard-fought seven-game series to advance to the Conference Finals for the first time.

In their first appearance in the Eastern Conference Finals, the Heat faced off against the top–seeded, and defending NBA champion Chicago Bulls, who won the Central Division title, and were led by the trio of All-Star guard Michael Jordan, All-Star forward Scottie Pippen, and rebound-specialist Dennis Rodman. The Heat lost the first three games, but managed to win Game 4 over the Bulls at the Miami Arena, 87–80. However, the Heat lost Game 5 to the Bulls on the road, 100–87 at the United Center, thus losing the series in five games. It was also the fifth playoff matchup between Riley and Bulls head coach Phil Jackson that decade, with the first three meetings from 1992 to 1994 when Riley coached the Knicks, and in last year's playoffs.

The Bulls would go on to defeat the Utah Jazz in six games in the 1997 NBA Finals, winning their second consecutive NBA championship, and their fifth championship in seven years.

== Off-season ==
=== NBA draft ===
The Heat did not have any draft picks in 1996.

== Roster ==
1996–97 Miami Heat roster
Players

Pos.	No.	Player	Height	Weight	DOB	From
G	35	Willie Anderson	6 ft 7 in (2.01 m)	190 lb (86 kg)	1967–01–08	Georgia
F	2	Keith Askins	6 ft 7 in (2.01 m)	197 lb (89 kg)	1967–12–15	Alabama
C	8	Isaac Austin	6 ft 10 in (2.08 m)	255 lb (116 kg)	1969–08–18	Arizona State
F	3	Bruce Bowen	6 ft 7 in (2.01 m)	185 lb (84 kg)	1971–06–14	Cal State Fullerton
F/C	42	P. J. Brown	6 ft 11 in (2.11 m)	225 lb (102 kg)	1969–10–14	Louisiana Tech
G	11	John Crotty	6 ft 1 in (1.85 m)	185 lb (84 kg)	1969–07–15	Virginia
G	23	Gary Grant	6 ft 3 in (1.91 m)	185 lb (84 kg)	1965–04–21	Michigan
G	10	Tim Hardaway	6 ft 0 in (1.83 m)	175 lb (79 kg)	1966–09–01	UTEP
G	21	Voshon Lenard	6 ft 4 in (1.93 m)	205 lb (93 kg)	1973–05–14	Minnesota
G/F	9	Dan Majerle	6 ft 6 in (1.98 m)	215 lb (98 kg)	1965–09–09	Central Michigan
F	24	Jamal Mashburn	6 ft 8 in (2.03 m)	240 lb (109 kg)	1972–11–29	Kentucky
C	33	Alonzo Mourning	6 ft 10 in (2.08 m)	240 lb (109 kg)	1970–02–08	Georgetown
F	54	Ed Pinckney	6 ft 9 in (2.06 m)	195 lb (88 kg)	1963–03–27	Villanova
F	30	Mark Strickland	6 ft 9 in (2.06 m)	210 lb (95 kg)	1970–07–14	Temple

Coaches
Head coach
- Pat Riley
Assistant(s)
- Jeff Bzdelik
- Tony Fiorentino
- Bob McAdoo
- Scotty Robertson
- Stan Van Gundy

Legend
- (DP) Unsigned draft pick
- (FA) Free agent
- (S) Suspended
- Injured

Roster
Updated: March 25, 1997

== Regular season ==
=== Season standings ===
Atlantic Division	W	L	PCT	GB	Home	Road	Div
y-Miami Heat	61	21	.744	–	29–12	32–9	16–8
x-New York Knicks	57	25	.695	4	31–10	26–15	19–6
x-Orlando Magic	45	37	.549	16	26–15	19–22	13–11
x-Washington Bullets	44	38	.537	17	25–16	19–22	14–10
New Jersey Nets	26	56	.317	35	16–25	10–31	11–13
Philadelphia 76ers	22	60	.268	39	11–30	11–30	11–14
Boston Celtics	15	67	.183	46	11–30	4–37	1–23

1996–97 NBA East standings
#	Eastern Conference				
#	Team	W	L	PCT	GB
1	z-Chicago Bulls	69	13	.841	–
2	y-Miami Heat	61	21	.744	8
3	x-New York Knicks	57	25	.695	12
4	x-Atlanta Hawks	56	26	.683	13
5	x-Detroit Pistons	54	28	.659	15
6	x-Charlotte Hornets	54	28	.659	15
7	x-Orlando Magic	45	37	.549	24
8	x-Washington Bullets	44	38	.537	25
9	Cleveland Cavaliers	42	40	.512	27
10	Indiana Pacers	39	43	.476	30
11	Milwaukee Bucks	33	49	.402	36
12	Toronto Raptors	30	52	.366	39
13	New Jersey Nets	26	56	.317	43
14	Philadelphia 76ers	22	60	.268	47
15	Boston Celtics	15	67	.183	54

z – clinched division title
y – clinched division title
x – clinched playoff spot

=== Schedule ===
Game	Date	Opponent	Result	Heat points	Opponents	Record	Streak	Notes
1								

== Playoffs ==
In the first round of the playoffs, the Heat confronted their in-state rivals, the Orlando Magic. The Heat won the first two games. In Orlando, the Magic defeated the Heat to force a fifth game. The Heat won the decisive Game 5 at home, 91–83. Winning their first ever playoff series. In the following round, the Heat were matched up against Pat Riley's former team, the New York Knicks. After the first four games, the Knicks had a 3–1 series lead. The Heat won Game 5 although the game was remembered for P. J. Brown fighting with Heisman Trophy winner Charlie Ward. Some Knicks players came off the bench and earned automatic suspensions, and Brown was suspended for the rest of the series. The Heat players stayed on the bench and gained an advantage for the rest of the series. The Heat eliminated the undermanned Knicks in seven games and one of the most heated rivalries in the NBA was born. In the Eastern Conference finals, the Heat were defeated by the eventual NBA champion Chicago Bulls in five games.

1997 playoff game log
First round: 3–2 (home: 3–0; road: 0–2)

Game	Date	Team	Score	High points	High rebounds	High assists	Location Attendance	Series
1	April 24	Orlando	W 99–64	Voshon Lenard (24)	P. J. Brown (12)	Tim Hardaway (11)	Miami Arena; 15,200	1–0
2	April 27	Orlando	W 104–87	Tim Hardaway (20)	Alonzo Mourning (9)	Tim Hardaway (11)	Miami Arena; 15,200	2–0
3	April 29	@ Orlando	L 75–88	Alonzo Mourning (17)	Alonzo Mourning (17)	Tim Hardaway (8)	Orlando Arena; 17,248	2–1
4	May 1	@ Orlando	L 91–99	Alonzo Mourning (23)	Mourning, Brown (13)	Tim Hardaway (8)	Orlando Arena; 16,555	2–2
5	May 4	Orlando	W 91–83	Alonzo Mourning (22)	P. J. Brown (14)	Tim Hardaway (11)	Miami Arena; 15,200	3–2

Conference Semi-finals: 4–3 (home: 3–1; road: 1–2)

Game	Date	Team	Score	High points	High rebounds	High assists	Location Attendance	Series
1	May 7	New York	L 79–88	Tim Hardaway (21)	P. J. Brown (12)	Tim Hardaway (6)	Miami Arena; 14,870	0–1
2	May 9	New York	W 88–84	Tim Hardaway (34)	Alonzo Mourning (13)	Hardaway, Majerle (4)	Miami Arena; 14,870	1–1
3	May 11	@ New York	L 73–77	Voshon Lenard (22)	P. J. Brown (10)	Tim Hardaway (8)	Madison Square Garden; 19,763	1–2
4	May 12	@ New York	L 76–89	Tim Hardaway (14)	P. J. Brown (12)	Willie Anderson (4)	Madison Square Garden; 19,763	1–3
5	May 14	New York	W 96–81	Voshon Lenard (21)	P. J. Brown (12)	Tim Hardaway (6)	Miami Arena; 14,782	2–3
6	May 16	@ New York	W 95–90	Alonzo Mourning (28)	Alonzo Mourning (9)	Tim Hardaway (8)	Madison Square Garden; 19,763	3–3
7	May 18	New York	W 101–90	Tim Hardaway (38)	Alonzo Mourning (12)	Tim Hardaway (7)	Miami Arena; 14,870	4–3

Conference finals: 1–4 (home: 1–1; road: 0–3)

Game	Date	Team	Score	High points	High rebounds	High assists	Location Attendance	Series
1	May 20	@ Chicago	L 77–84	Alonzo Mourning (21)	Mourning, Austin (8)	Tim Hardaway (9)	United Center; 24,544	0–1
2	May 22	@ Chicago	L 68–75	Tim Hardaway (15)	Alonzo Mourning (8)	Tim Hardaway (5)	United Center; 24,544	0–2
3	May 24	Chicago	L 74–98	Voshon Lenard (14)	Alonzo Mourning (9)	John Crotty (5)	Miami Arena; 14,720	0–3
4	May 26	Chicago	W 87–80	Tim Hardaway (25)	Alonzo Mourning (14)	Tim Hardaway (7)	Miami Arena; 14,720	1–3
5	May 28	@ Chicago	L 87–100	Tim Hardaway (27)	Alonzo Mourning (8)	Lenard, Hardaway (5)	United Center; 24,544	1–4

1997 schedule

== Player statistics ==
=== Regular season ===
Player	POS	GP	GS	MP	REB	AST	STL	BLK	PTS	MPG	RPG	APG	SPG	BPG	PPG
Isaac Austin	C	82	17	1,881	478	101	45	43	792	22.9	5.8	1.2	.5	.5	9.7
Tim Hardaway	PG	81	81	3,136	277	695	151	9	1,644	38.7	3.4	8.6	1.9	.1	20.3
P. J. Brown	PF	80	71	2,592	670	92	85	98	761	32.4	8.4	1.2	1.1	1.2	9.5
Keith Askins	SF	78	30	1,773	271	75	53	19	384	22.7	3.5	1.0	.7	.2	4.9
Voshon Lenard	SG	73	47	2,111	217	161	50	18	897	28.9	3.0	2.2	.7	.2	12.3
Alonzo Mourning	C	66	65	2,320	656	104	56	189	1,310	35.2	9.9	1.6	.8	2.9	19.8
John Crotty	PG	48	0	659	47	102	18	0	232	13.7	1.0	2.1	.4	.0	4.8
Predrag Danilović^{†}	SG	43	33	1,351	102	77	39	8	486	31.4	2.4	1.8	.9	.2	11.3
Dan Majerle	SF	36	26	1,264	162	116	54	14	390	35.1	4.5	3.2	1.5	.4	10.8
Jamal Mashburn^{†}	SF	32	30	1,189	179	111	43	7	428	37.2	5.6	3.5	1.3	.2	13.4
Mark Strickland	PF	31	0	153	37	1	4	10	62	4.9	1.2	.0	.1	.3	2.0
Willie Anderson	SG	28	1	303	42	34	14	4	83	10.8	1.5	1.2	.5	.1	3.0
Gary Grant	PG	28	0	365	38	45	16	0	110	13.0	1.4	1.6	.6	.0	3.9
Ed Pinckney	PF	27	0	273	65	6	8	9	66	10.1	2.4	.2	.3	.3	2.4
Kurt Thomas	PF	18	9	374	107	9	12	9	113	20.8	5.9	.5	.7	.5	6.3
Martin Müürsepp^{†}	PF	10	0	27	5	3	0	1	17	2.7	.5	.3	.0	.1	1.7
James Scott	SF	8	0	32	6	3	2	0	1	4.0	.8	.4	.3	.0	.1
Bruce Bowen	SF	1	0	1	0	0	0	1	0	1.0	.0	.0	.0	1.0	.0
Matt Fish^{†}	C	1	0	1	0	0	0	0	0	1.0	.0	.0	.0	.0	.0

- ^{†} Denotes player spent time with another team in the season. Stats reflect time with the Heat only.

=== Playoffs ===
Player	POS	GP	GS	MP	REB	AST	STL	BLK	PTS	MPG	RPG	APG	SPG	BPG	PPG
Tim Hardaway	PG	17	17	701	69	119	27	1	318	41.2	4.1	7.0	1.6	.1	18.7
Alonzo Mourning	C	17	17	630	173	18	11	46	303	37.1	10.2	1.1	.6	2.7	17.8
Jamal Mashburn	SF	17	17	554	84	35	17	2	178	32.6	4.9	2.1	1.0	.1	10.5
Voshon Lenard	SG	17	17	548	50	36	11	3	194	32.2	2.9	2.1	.6	.2	11.4
Dan Majerle	SF	17	2	496	72	43	21	4	136	29.2	4.2	2.5	1.2	.2	8.0
P. J. Brown	PF	15	15	451	129	10	9	20	122	30.1	8.6	.7	.6	1.3	8.1
Isaac Austin	C	15	0	287	66	6	6	7	98	19.1	4.4	.4	.4	.5	6.5
John Crotty	PG	15	0	125	11	11	4	0	37	8.3	.7	.7	.3	.0	2.5
Keith Askins	SF	12	0	146	28	7	3	2	30	12.2	2.3	.6	.3	.2	2.5
Willie Anderson	SG	9	0	120	17	5	4	2	33	13.3	1.9	.6	.4	.2	3.7
Mark Strickland	PF	4	0	16	3	1	1	0	8	4.0	.8	.3	.3	.0	2.0
Ed Pinckney	PF	2	0	6	0	1	0	0	4	3.0	.0	.5	.0	.0	2.0

== Awards ==
- Tim Hardaway, All NBA First Team
- P. J. Brown, All NBA Defensive Second Team
- Pat Riley, Coach of the Year
- Isaac Austin, NBA Most Improved Player Award
