= Darrin Hancock =

American basketball player (born 1971)

Personal information
- Born: November 3, 1971 (age 55) Birmingham, Alabama, U.S.
- Listed height: 6 ft 7 in (2.01 m)
- Listed weight: 205 lb (93 kg)

Career information
- High school: Griffin (Griffin, Georgia)
- College: Garden City CC (1990–1992); Kansas (1992–1993)
- NBA draft: 1994: 2nd round, 38th overall pick
- Drafted by: Charlotte Hornets
- Playing career: 1993–2005
- Position: Shooting guard / small forward
- Number: 4, 12, 35

Career history
- 1993–1994: Maurienne
- 1994–1996: Charlotte Hornets
- 1996: Milwaukee Bucks
- 1997: Atlanta Hawks
- 1997: Omaha Racers
- 1997: San Antonio Spurs
- 1997: Atlanta Hawks
- 1997–1998: Fort Wayne Fury
- 1998: New Jersey Shore Cats
- 1998–2000: Fort Wayne Fury
- 2000: Dodge City Legend
- 2000–2001: Kansas City Knights
- 2001–2003: Gary Steelheads
- 2003–2004: Sioux Falls Skyforce
- 2004: Pennsylvania ValleyDawgs
- 2004–2005: Gary Steelheads
- 2005: Kansas Cagerz

Career highlights
- 2× All-USBL Team (2000, 2003); USBL Post Season MVP (2003); McDonald's All-American (1990); 2× First-team Parade All-American (1989, 1990); 2× Mr. Georgia Basketball (1986, 1988)

Career CBA statistics
- Points: 4,003 (3.5 ppg)
- Rebounds: 169 (1.3 rpg)
- Assists: 89 (0.7 apg)
- Stats at NBA.com
- Stats at Basketball Reference

Darrin Hancock (born November 3, 1971) is an American former professional basketball player. In high school and college he was known for his strong offense, while his quick and agile moves to the basket drew comparisons to the likes of Dominique Wilkins. A Parade Magazine and McDonald's All-American standout at Griffin High School in Griffin, Georgia, Hancock was ranked among the country's best high school basketball players in the late 1980s. He played his first two college seasons at Garden City Community College, where he was considered one of the top junior college recruits in the nation before transferring to the University of Kansas. There he was the starting small forward on the Kansas Jayhawks' Final Four-bound squad in the 1993 NCAA Division I men's basketball tournament. Hancock left college after his junior year to play professional basketball and eventually found success in United States semi-pro basketball leagues after several uneventful stints in the National Basketball Association (NBA). He is considered to be among the best all-time Georgia high school basketball players in the state's history.

== Early life ==
Darrin Hancock was born and raised in Birmingham, Alabama but relocated to the small community of Griffin, Georgia, south of Atlanta in Spalding County, when he was in sixth grade. Hancock suffered tragedy at a young age in 1978 when his father died after succumbing to a heart attack and thereafter was raised by his mother. As a child, he kept to himself and only picked up playing basketball in the eighth grade. Hancock credited James Martin, the Griffin High School basketball coach, as his most positive influence other than his mother. Martin was his coach and mentor in high school and frequently advised Hancock on professional and personal affairs. The young Hancock eventually came to look at Martin as a father figure and the coach later became his legal guardian.

== High school career ==
The young Alabama native attended Griffin High School where his considerably tall height of 6'6" and athletic talent helped land him the role of starting center on his school's varsity basketball squad during his freshman year. Hancock instantly emerged as the star of the team and was considered as one of the state's top freshman high school basketball players during the 1986–87 season. He managed to lead the 25–2 Griffin Bears in points and rebounds as well as helping his number two ranked school seize the state's Region 6-AAAA championship title, all the while before completing his freshman year.

The Griffin Bears continued to flourish with Hancock, as the now number one ranked basketball squad posted a 28–1 record and claimed their second Region 6-AAAA title during the 1987–88 season. Darrin Hancock finished the season averaging 17 points per game while earning the distinct honor of being the first sophomore to be named as The Atlanta Journal-Constitution's state Player of the Year. He was not only considered one of the state's premier underclassmen, but was also rated as the number one sophomore basketball player in the nation by B.C. Scouting Service during his second year in high school.

Hancock is a terrific run-and-jump athlete, a tremendous leaper. He has tremendous quick moves around the basket. He just blows by people before they know what is going on ... He reminds me of a young Dominique Wilkins.

— Bob Gibbons, recruiting analyst

Griffin High School began the 1988–89 season in a new basketball class, the 4-AAAA South region, but were unable to replicate their recent success. The team struggled to adjust to the new class and dropped to a sixth-place ranking with a 19–5 record. However, Hancock continued to achieve individual success, including being named to the 1988–89 Parade Magazine All-American First Team and finishing third in votes for the magazine's National Player of the Year award. He was additionally considered as one of the nation's top five high school players by several national surveys upon entering his senior year in school.

Hancock and the Bears finally managed to break into the 4-AAAA South region after their relative lapse during their previous season. The team obtained the number one ranking in their new class and finished with an impressive 26–4 record before losing to Southwest Macon High School in the state's Class 4-AAAA state quarterfinals. Hancock, who recently had also begun playing in the forward position, displayed what would be considered his best single-game high school performance that season when he scored 50 points and nailed the match's game-winning three-pointer in a double-overtime victory against Vanguard High School of Ocala, Florida. The All-American averaged 30 points and nine rebounds a game at the close of the 1989–90 season. Darrin Hancock, considered to be one of the nation's top senior high school basketball players at the time, was a highly sought after prize by many college basketball programs. The All-American eventually signed a letter of intent to attend the University of Nevada, Las Vegas (UNLV) in the spring of 1990 but was ultimately disqualified from accepting an NCAA Division I scholarship (under Proposition 48 guidelines) because of his grade point average. Unable to enroll at UNLV as a college freshman, Hancock instead opted to enroll at Garden City Community College in southwest Kansas, where he could officially become eligible to transfer to another university after completing his coursework.

== College career ==
=== Garden City College ===
Darrin Hancock relocated from his Georgia home to the Midwest and settled in rural Finney County, Kansas in 1990 to begin his enrollment at Garden City Community College. He joined Garden City's basketball squad as the team's star swingman and averaged 17.5 points, 8.6 rebounds, 5.3 assists and 2.7 steals during his freshman season. His continued athletic accomplishments earned him his third consecutive Parade Magazine All-American recognition as well as being named to the JUCO All-American Third Team.

The Georgia transplant further expanded his prowess on the court during his college sophomore season and averaged 21.8 points per game and 11.7 rebounds per game. Hancock displayed his top single-game college performance when he recorded a triple-double against Barton County Community College, scoring a then-collegiate career high of 37 points, 14 rebounds, 10 assists and three steals. Many considered Hancock to be the nation's number one junior college basketball player, including the National Junior College Athletic Association (NJCAA), who named the sophomore star as the 1991–92 NJCCA Player of the Year. Hancock also captured the attention of the nearby University of Kansas, whose powerhouse basketball program successfully persuaded him to become a Jayhawk for the upcoming 1992–93 season on an athletic scholarship.

=== Kansas ===
Hancock transferred to the University of Kansas where he was tapped to start as the basketball team's starting small forward. News of Hancock's addition to the Kansas Jayhawks' basketball squad created quite a buzz and even prompted Jayhawks' coach Roy Williams to state that, "Darrin is one of the best athletes in the nation [a]nd he will be one of the best athletes ever to put on a Kansas uniform." Several hoops analysts forecasted Kansas as a top-ranked team and as a possible Final Four contender with the arrival of Hancock. The Jayhawks fulfilled those predictions, capturing the 1993 Big Eight Regular Season Championship and the second seed in the Midwest division of the 1993 NCAA Division I men's basketball tournament with a 27–8 record. The Jayhawks marched through the NCAA tournament and arrived at the Final Four Regional Championships, their second appearance in three years. Though Kansas eventually lost to North Carolina in the Final Four, the team's outstanding performance earned the squad a top ten nationwide ranking during the regular season, including a brief time spent at number one.

The dynamic backcourt duo of Rex Walters and Adonis Jordan provided the bulk of the Jayhawks' scoring. Hancock, on the other hand, was primarily a secondary offensive contributor with an average of 7.5 points per game in 33 starts. Hancock's failure to live up to pre-season expectations appeared to have been a result of not adapting well to Kansas' style of play. In July 1993 he abruptly left the university after undisclosed personal issues forced the Jayhawk small forward to miss required summer school coursework and thus become academically ineligible to play on the team. Hancock transferred to Indiana State University in September but had a change of heart after one month, choosing instead to pursue a professional career in Europe.

== Professional career ==
=== Charlotte Hornets ===
The former Jayhawk spent his first season as a pro playing in the French Pro B League for the Maurienne basketball club, where he averaged 17.3 points and 5.4 rebounds over 17 games. Back in the United States, players and teams were prepping for the upcoming 1994 NBA draft. Hancock attended the Chicago pre-draft camp over the summer where he showcased his trademark agility to NBA scouts. The Charlotte Hornets, who earlier packaged away their first-round pick as part of the Hersey Hawkins-Kendall Gill trade, were busy deciding whom to choose for their sole 2nd-round pick. The organization sought out either a rebounding-prone rookie with height or a backup point guard. However, many of Charlotte's rookie prospects were already selected by time it was their turn; and therefore the Hornets tapped Hancock with the 38th overall pick of the draft after he impressed the organization with athleticism that complimented the team's running game style of play. The young rookie earned the final open slot on Charlotte's 12-man roster after displaying his skills at the NBA summer league over the off-season. Hancock joined a veteran-heavy team that was led by the young powerhouse combination of Larry Johnson and Alonzo Mourning. Hancock's own talents were outmatched by many of his teammates, compromising his minutes on the court as the Hornets' 12th man. Nonetheless, he saw significant playing time in April 1995 when Charlotte's starting small forward Scott Burrell and backup small forward David Wingate were simultaneously out with injuries. Hancock recorded a then NBA career high of 15 points that same month against the Philadelphia 76ers in one of his seven starts that season. As a team, the Hornets enjoyed success with their best regular season record in franchise history (50–32) while finishing second in the Central Division. Charlotte returned to the NBA playoffs for the second time in three years before suffering a loss against the Chicago Bulls in the first round. Hancock saw limited playing time in his NBA Playoffs debut as the Hornets shifted players around in order to keep a big lineup against the Chicago Bulls. Nonetheless, the Hornet's rookie contributed in the post-season action, though sparingly, playing less than 10 minutes in three games.

I saw Darrin play in Chicago [NBA pre-draft camp] and he can flat-out run the floor ... He's an intriguing guy. He's got a nice upside.

— Dave Twardzik, Charlotte Hornets Director of Player Personnel

Hancock spent the 1995 summer off-season working on expanding his offensive prowess, which appeared to have some effect on his game during a surprising pre-season start where he averaged 15.5 points over six exhibition games. Starter Scott Burrell entered the season on the injured list nursing a torn Achilles tendon, forcing the newly acquired shooting guard Glen Rice to switch positions and replace Burrell as the squad's starting small forward. Charlotte took a chance with tapping Hancock to temporarily fill the void at the starting shooting guard position in the meantime. He appeared in four starts during the middle of November, averaging five points and two rebounds. However, Burrell returned to the starting lineup later in the month, relegating Hancock back to the bench. Darrin Hancock saw limited playing time in about half of all regular season games through the end of December but recorded an NBA career high of 16 points during an away game against the Utah Jazz. The now second-year NBA swingman began to see a dramatic increase in playing time after Burrell suffered a season-ending dislocated shoulder on New Year's Eve. This time around Charlotte went with Dell Curry as the team's new replacement starting shooting guard, designating Hancock as the Hornets' primary guard-forward swingman reserve. Hancock finished the season with a total average of 13.3 minutes per game in 63 games. Despite seeing more time on the court, Hancock was unable to carry over his pre-season offensive exploits into the regular season and settled instead for a 4.3 points per game average. The Charlotte Hornets, playing their first year without star Alonzo Mourning, had also seen better times after failing to make the playoffs with a 41–41 record. The Hornets decided not to re-sign Hancock at the end of his two-year contract, making the former Hornet a marketable free agent soon thereafter.

=== Bucks–Hawks–Spurs ===
David Wood has done a very good job along with Darrin Hancock. They're two of the best defenders we have, and we'll need that throughout the season.

— Chris Ford, Milwaukee Bucks Head Coach

Darrin Hancock was signed by the Milwaukee Bucks on October 3, 1996 and his strong defensive front court presence helped the former Hornet survive the team's off-season cuts. He averaged 4.8 points and 14.8 minutes in six pre-season contests and eventually made the team's roster for the start of the 1996–97 season. However, Milwaukee head coach Chris Ford struggled to work Hancock into his playbook and as a result the newly acquired Buck saw scarce minutes on the floor, averaging 4.3 minutes per game as small forward reserve. He was traded along with a conditional second-round draft pick to the Phoenix Suns in exchange for Chucky Brown after playing in only nine games for Milwaukee. Hancock remained inactive on the Suns' injured list with bruised knees and was waived a week later on December 11, 1996.

However, Hancock's future soon looked promising when Tyrone Corbin, the Atlanta Hawks' starting small forward, went down with a sprained left ankle in late December. The organization took interest in the native Georgian, who was looking to rebound back into the league after having recently been dropped by the Suns. Hancock, who at the time was conveniently residing in Atlanta, accepted his hometown team's eventual offer. The Hawks signed Henry James and later added Hancock on January 2, 1997, handing Corbin's starting role over to James while assigning Hancock as the team's backup small forward. However, Darrin Hancock only saw scarce time on the court during his stay with Atlanta, playing a total of 10 minutes in two games. Just five days after joining the Hawks, the team released Hancock in order to re-activate Tyrone Corbin from the injured list.

However, the dismissal did not prevent Hancock from returning to the court. He soon found an opportunity to in the Continental Basketball Association (CBA) when the Omaha Racers offered Hancock a deal to play for the team in late January. Hancock averaged 14 points and 3.5 rebounds in his first two games with the Racers. Hancock departed the CBA soon thereafter and found his way back into the big leagues on a 10-day contract with the San Antonio Spurs on January 29, 1997, joining his fifth NBA team in three seasons. Hancock donned a Spurs uniform for only eight minutes during a road game against the Philadelphia 76ers before San Antonio decided against re-signing his 10-day contract in favor for re-signing teammate Jamie Feick. Hancock was offered a 10-day contract in March to return to Atlanta, where he finished the remainder of season as a Hawk.

== NBA career statistics ==
Legend
GP	Games played	GS	Games started	MPG	Minutes per game
FG%	Field goal percentage	3P%	3-point field goal percentage	FT%	Free throw percentage
RPG	Rebounds per game	APG	Assists per game	SPG	Steals per game
BPG	Blocks per game	PPG	Points per game	**Bold**	Career high

=== Regular season ===
Year	Team	GP	GS	MPG	FG%	3P%	FT%	RPG	APG	SPG	BPG	PPG
1994–95	Charlotte	46	**7**	9.2	**.562**	**.333**	.410	1.2	0.7	0.4	**0.1**	3.3
1995–96	Charlotte	**63**	**7**	**13.3**	.523	**.333**	.644	**1.6**	0.7	0.4	**0.1**	**4.3**
1996–97	Milwaukee	9	0	4.3	.333	.000	.000	0.6	0.4	0.2	0.0	0.4
1996–97	Atlanta	14	0	6.1	.481	.000	.667	0.9	0.5	**0.5**	**0.1**	2.4
1996–97	San Antonio	1	0	8.0	.500	.000	**1.000**	0.0	**1.0**	0.0	0.0	4.0
Career		133	14	10.5	.530	.333	.579	1.3	0.7	0.4	0.1	3.5

=== Playoffs ===
Year	Team	GP	GS	MPG	FG%	3P%	FT%	RPG	APG	SPG	BPG	PPG
1994–95	Charlotte	3	0	**6.0**	.333	.000	.000	**1.3**	**0.3**	**0.3**	0.0	**1.3**
1996–97	Atlanta	**6**	0	5.5	**.400**	.000	.000	0.8	0.2	0.2	**0.2**	0.7
Career		9	0	5.7	.364	.000	.000	1.0	0.2	0.2	0.1	0.9

== Personal ==
Darrin Hancock is married to Kathleen Hancock. Darrin and Kathleen met while he was at GCCC. The two finally married in 2011. Darrin Hancock is the father of Darrin "Buck" Hancock Jr., a recruited college football running back at Garden City Community College as of 2010 and formerly a preseason All-Region 4-AAAA standout running back at Griffin High School.

== Awards and accomplishments ==
- The Atlanta Journal-Constitution Boys' Class AAAA All-State First Team (1987–88)
- The Atlanta Journal-Constitution Player of the Year (1988)
- 1988 Mr. Georgia Basketball
- 2× Parade Magazine All-American First Team (1988–89, 1989–90)
- Dapper Dan Roundball Classic (1990)
- McDonald's All-American Team (1990)
- U.S. Olympic Festival: Men's Basketball South Team (1990)
- Parade Magazine All-American Second Team (1990–91)
- JUCO All-American Third Team (1990–91)
- National Junior College Athletic Association All-American Team (1991–92)
- 1991–92 National Junior College Athletic Association Player of the Year
- 2× All-USBL Team (2000, 2003)
- 2003 USBL Post Season MVP
