= 1996–97 Indiana Pacers season =

NBA professional basketball team season

- Head coach: Larry Brown
- General manager: Donnie Walsh
- Owner: Herbert Simon
- Arena: Market Square Arena

Results
- Record: 39–43 (.476)
- Place: Division: 6th (Central); Conference: 10th (Eastern)
- Playoff finish: Did not qualify
- Stats at Basketball Reference

Local media
- Television: WTTV; Fox Sports Midwest
- Radio: WIBC

The 1996–97 Indiana Pacers season was the 21st season for the Indiana Pacers in the National Basketball Association, and their 30th season as a franchise.

== Season summary ==
=== Off-season ===
During the off-season, the Pacers acquired Jalen Rose and Reggie Williams from the Denver Nuggets; the team also received the tenth overall pick in the 1996 NBA draft from the Nuggets, and selected center Erick Dampier out of Mississippi State University. However, after only playing just two games for the Pacers, Williams was then traded to the New Jersey Nets in exchange for Vincent Askew.

=== Regular season ===
The Pacers dealt with injuries all season long, as Rik Smits only played 52 games due to a foot injury, while Derrick McKey only appeared in just 50 games due to a foot injury, and a ruptured Achilles tendon, and Haywoode Workman was out with a season-ending knee injury after only playing just four games. With the addition of Rose and Dampier, the Pacers struggled losing eight of their first eleven games of the regular season, then posted a five-game winning streak afterwards, but continued to struggle playing around .500 in winning percentage for the remainder of the season, holding a 23–23 record at the All-Star break. At mid-season, the team traded Askew, and Eddie Johnson to the Denver Nuggets in exchange for former Pacers guard Mark Jackson, and former Pacers forward LaSalle Thompson. Despite the return of Jackson after a brief stint with the Nuggets, the Pacers finished in sixth place in the Central Division with a disappointing 39–43 record, and failed to qualify for the NBA playoffs for the first time since the 1988–89 season.

Reggie Miller led the Pacers in scoring with 21.6 points per game, and also led the league with 229 three-point field goals, while Smits averaged 17.1 points and 6.9 rebounds per game, and Antonio Davis provided the team with 10.5 points and 7.3 rebounds per game. In addition, Dale Davis provided with 10.4 points and 9.7 rebounds per game, while second-year guard Travis Best contributed 9.9 points, 4.2 assists and 1.3 steals per game, Jackson averaged 9.0 points, 9.8 assists and 1.5 steals per game in 30 games after the trade, and McKey contributed 8.0 points and 4.8 rebounds per game. Off the bench, Rose contributed 7.3 points per game, while Duane Ferrell provided with 6.4 points per game, and Dampier averaged 5.1 points and 4.1 rebounds per game.

During the NBA All-Star weekend at the Gund Arena in Cleveland, Ohio, Dampier was selected for the NBA Rookie Game, as a member of the Eastern Conference Rookie team. Despite a stellar season, Miller was not selected for the 1997 NBA All-Star Game. The Pacers finished 21st in the NBA in home-game attendance, with an attendance of 636,735 at the Market Square Arena during the regular season.

=== Aftermath ===
Following the season, head coach Larry Brown, who won his 600th game during the regular season, was forced to resign after coaching the Pacers for four seasons; he would later on take a coaching job with the Philadelphia 76ers. Meanwhile, Dampier and Ferrell were both traded to the Golden State Warriors, and Thompson retired after playing in his second stint with the Pacers.

== Offseason ==
=== Draft picks ===
Round	Pick	Player	Position	Nationality	College
1	10	Erick Dampier	C	United States	Mississippi State
2	52	Mark Pope	PF/C	United States	Kentucky

== Roster ==
1996–97 Indiana Pacers roster
Players

Pos.	No.	Player	Height	Weight	DOB	From
G	4	Travis Best	5 ft 11 in (1.80 m)	182 lb (83 kg)	1972–07–12	Georgia Tech
C	25	Erick Dampier	6 ft 11 in (2.11 m)	265 lb (120 kg)	1975–07–14	Mississippi State
F	33	Antonio Davis	6 ft 9 in (2.06 m)	215 lb (98 kg)	1968–10–31	UTEP
F	32	Dale Davis	6 ft 11 in (2.11 m)	230 lb (104 kg)	1969–03–25	Clemson
F	27	Duane Ferrell	6 ft 7 in (2.01 m)	209 lb (95 kg)	1965–02–28	Georgia Tech
F	24	Darvin Ham	6 ft 7 in (2.01 m)	220 lb (100 kg)	1973–07–23	Texas Tech
G	20	Fred Hoiberg	6 ft 4 in (1.93 m)	203 lb (92 kg)	1972–10–15	Iowa State
G	13	Mark Jackson	6 ft 1 in (1.85 m)	180 lb (82 kg)	1965–04–01	St. John's
F	9	Derrick McKey (injured)	6 ft 9 in (2.06 m)	205 lb (93 kg)	1966–10–10	Alabama
G	31	Reggie Miller	6 ft 7 in (2.01 m)	185 lb (84 kg)	1965–08–24	UCLA
F	5	Jalen Rose	6 ft 8 in (2.03 m)	210 lb (95 kg)	1973–01–30	Michigan
F	55	Brent Scott	6 ft 10 in (2.08 m)	250 lb (113 kg)	1971–06–15	Rice
C	45	Rik Smits	7 ft 4 in (2.24 m)	250 lb (113 kg)	1966–08–23	Marist
C	41	LaSalle Thompson (injured)	6 ft 10 in (2.08 m)	245 lb (111 kg)	1961–06–23	Texas
G	3	Haywoode Workman (injured)	6 ft 2 in (1.88 m)	180 lb (82 kg)	1966–01–23	Oral Roberts

Coaches
Head coach
- Larry Brown
Assistant(s)
- Bill Blair
- Gar Heard
- Billy King

Legend
- (DP) Unsigned draft pick
- (FA) Free agent
- (S) Suspended
- Injured

Roster

== Regular season ==
=== Season standings ===
Central Division	W	L	PCT	GB	Home	Road	Div
y-Chicago Bulls	69	13	.841	–	39–2	30–11	24–4
x-Atlanta Hawks	56	26	.683	13	36–5	20–21	17–11
x-Detroit Pistons	54	28	.659	15	30–11	24–17	17–11
x-Charlotte Hornets	54	28	.659	15	30–11	24–17	14–14
Cleveland Cavaliers	42	40	.512	27	25–16	17–24	13–15
Indiana Pacers	39	43	.476	30	21–20	18–23	11–17
Milwaukee Bucks	33	49	.402	36	20–21	13–28	10–18
Toronto Raptors	30	52	.366	39	18–23	12–29	6–22

1996–97 NBA East standings
#	Eastern Conference				
#	Team	W	L	PCT	GB
1	z-Chicago Bulls	69	13	.841	–
2	y-Miami Heat	61	21	.744	8
3	x-New York Knicks	57	25	.695	12
4	x-Atlanta Hawks	56	26	.683	13
5	x-Detroit Pistons	54	28	.659	15
6	x-Charlotte Hornets	54	28	.659	15
7	x-Orlando Magic	45	37	.549	24
8	x-Washington Bullets	44	38	.537	25
9	Cleveland Cavaliers	42	40	.512	27
10	Indiana Pacers	39	43	.476	30
11	Milwaukee Bucks	33	49	.402	36
12	Toronto Raptors	30	52	.366	39
13	New Jersey Nets	26	56	.317	43
14	Philadelphia 76ers	22	60	.268	47
15	Boston Celtics	15	67	.183	54

z – clinched division title
y – clinched division title
x – clinched playoff spot

=== Game log ===
1996–97 game log
November

Game	Date	Team	Score	High points	High rebounds	High assists	Location Attendance	Record

December

Game	Date	Team	Score	High points	High rebounds	High assists	Location Attendance	Record

January

Game	Date	Team	Score	High points	High rebounds	High assists	Location Attendance	Record

February

Game	Date	Team	Score	High points	High rebounds	High assists	Location Attendance	Record

March

Game	Date	Team	Score	High points	High rebounds	High assists	Location Attendance	Record

April

Game	Date	Team	Score	High points	High rebounds	High assists	Location Attendance	Record

1996–97 schedule

== Player statistics ==
=== Regular season ===
Player	POS	GP	GS	MP	REB	AST	STL	BLK	PTS	MPG	RPG	APG	SPG	BPG	PPG
Antonio Davis	PF	82	28	2,335	598	65	42	84	858	28.5	7.3	.8	.5	1.0	10.5
Reggie Miller	SG	81	81	2,966	286	273	75	25	1,751	36.6	3.5	3.4	.9	.3	21.6
Dale Davis	PF	80	76	2,589	772	59	60	77	832	32.4	9.7	.7	.8	1.0	10.4
Travis Best	PG	76	46	2,064	166	318	98	5	754	27.2	2.2	4.2	1.3	.1	9.9
Erick Dampier	C	72	21	1,052	294	43	19	73	370	14.6	4.1	.6	.3	1.0	5.1
Jalen Rose	SF	66	6	1,188	121	155	57	18	482	18.0	1.8	2.3	.9	.3	7.3
Duane Ferrell	SF	62	18	1,115	141	66	38	6	394	18.0	2.3	1.1	.6	.1	6.4
Rik Smits	C	52	52	1,518	361	67	22	59	887	29.2	6.9	1.3	.4	1.1	17.1
Jerome Allen^{†}	SG	51	1	692	65	109	27	0	164	13.6	1.3	2.1	.5	.0	3.2
Derrick McKey	SF	50	49	1,449	241	135	47	30	400	29.0	4.8	2.7	.9	.6	8.0
Fred Hoiberg	SG	47	0	572	81	41	27	6	224	12.2	1.7	.9	.6	.1	4.8
Vincent Askew^{†}	SG	41	0	822	98	90	17	6	233	20.0	2.4	2.2	.4	.1	5.7
Mark Jackson^{†}	PG	30	30	1,053	124	294	46	3	271	35.1	4.1	9.8	1.5	.1	9.0
Eddie Johnson^{†}	SF	28	0	306	40	17	5	1	147	10.9	1.4	.6	.2	.0	5.3
Brent Scott	PF	16	0	55	9	3	1	1	19	3.4	.6	.2	.1	.1	1.2
LaSalle Thompson^{†}	C	9	0	35	8	2	0	0	3	3.9	.9	.2	.0	.0	.3
Haywoode Workman	PG	4	2	81	7	11	3	0	22	20.3	1.8	2.8	.8	.0	5.5
Reggie Williams^{†}	SF	2	0	33	7	2	0	0	5	16.5	3.5	1.0	.0	.0	2.5
Darvin Ham^{†}	SF	1	0	5	0	0	1	0	3	5.0	.0	.0	1.0	.0	3.0

- ^{†} Denotes player spent time with another team in the season. Stats reflect time with the Pacers only.

== Transactions ==
=== Overview ===
Players added

Via draft

- Erick Dampier
- Mark Pope

Via trade

- Jalen Rose
- Reggie Williams
- Mark Jackson
- LaSalle Thompson
- Darvin Ham

Via free agency

- Jerome Allen
- Brent Scott
Players Lost

Via trade

- Reggie Williams
- Jerome Allen
- Vincent Askew
- Eddie Johnson

Via free agency

- Scott Haskin
- Dwayne Schintzius
- Adrian Caldwell

=== Trades ===
June 13, 1996	To Indiana Pacers Reggie Williams, Jalen Rose and the draft rights to Erick Dampier	To Denver Nuggets Mark Jackson, Ricky Pierce, and a first-round draft pick
November 4, 1996	To Indiana Pacers Vincent Askew	To New Jersey Nets Reggie Williams
February 20, 1997	To Indiana Pacers Mark Jackson, LaSalle Thompson, and Darvin Ham	To Denver Nuggets Vincent Askew, Eddie Johnson, Jerome Allen, and 1997 and 1998 Second Round draft picks

=== Free agents ===
Additions
Player	Date signed	Former team
Jerome Allen	August 17, 1996	Minnesota Timberwolves
Brent Scott	September 27, 1996	Olitalia Forli (Italy)

Subtractions
Player	Reason Left	New team
Scott Haskin	Unknown	None
Dwayne Schintzius	Free Agency	Los Angeles Clippers
Adrian Caldwell	Free Agency	New Jersey Nets

Player transactions citation:

== See also ==
- 1996–97 NBA season
