= Ivano Newbill =

American basketball player

Personal information
- Born: December 12, 1970 (age 55) Sedalia, Missouri, U.S
- Listed height: 6 ft 9 in (2.06 m)
- Listed weight: 245 lb (111 kg)

Career information
- High school: Southwest (Macon, Georgia)
- College: Georgia Tech (1990–1994)
- NBA draft: 1994: undrafted
- Playing career: 1994–2000
- Position: Power forward / small forward
- Number: 52, 28, 40

Career history
- 1994–1995: Detroit Pistons
- 1995–1996: Grand Rapids Mackers
- 1996–1997: Atlanta Hawks
- 1997–1998: Vancouver Grizzlies
- 1999–2000: Yakima Sun Kings

Career highlights
- CBA champion (2000); Mr. Georgia Basketball (1987)
- Stats at NBA.com
- Stats at Basketball Reference

Ivano Miguel Newbill (born December 12, 1970, in Sedalia, Missouri) is an American former professional basketball player who played three seasons in the National Basketball Association (NBA) as a member of the Detroit Pistons (1994–95), the Atlanta Hawks (1996–97) and the Vancouver Grizzlies (1997–98). He attended the Georgia Institute of Technology.

Newbill won a Continental Basketball Association (CBA) championship with the Yakima Sun Kings in 2000.
