= Rubashkin =

Rubashkin (Russian: Рубашкин; feminine: Rubashkina) is a Russian Jewish surname (see Рубашка). Notable people with the surname include:

  - Aaron Rubashkin, American founder and owner of the Agriprocessors meat company, and his sons:
    - Moshe Rubashkin
    - Sholom Rubashkin
- Samuil Rubashkin (1906—1975), Soviet screenwriter, cameraman and artist
- Eliana Rubashkyn, Colombian pharmacist, chemist, human rights activist, former stateless gender refugee

== See also ==
- Rubashkin, Volgograd Oblast, Rural locality, Russia
