= Agriprocessors =

Defunct slaughterhouse and meat packaging corporation

Agriprocessors, Inc.
- Industry: Meat packing
- Founded: 1987
- Founder: Aaron Rubashkin
- Defunct: 2008
- Headquarters: Postville, Iowa, USA
- Area served: North America, Israel
- Products: Iowa Best Beef
- Owner: Aaron Rubashkin
- Website: The company websites were www.agriprocessors.com and www.rubashkin.com.

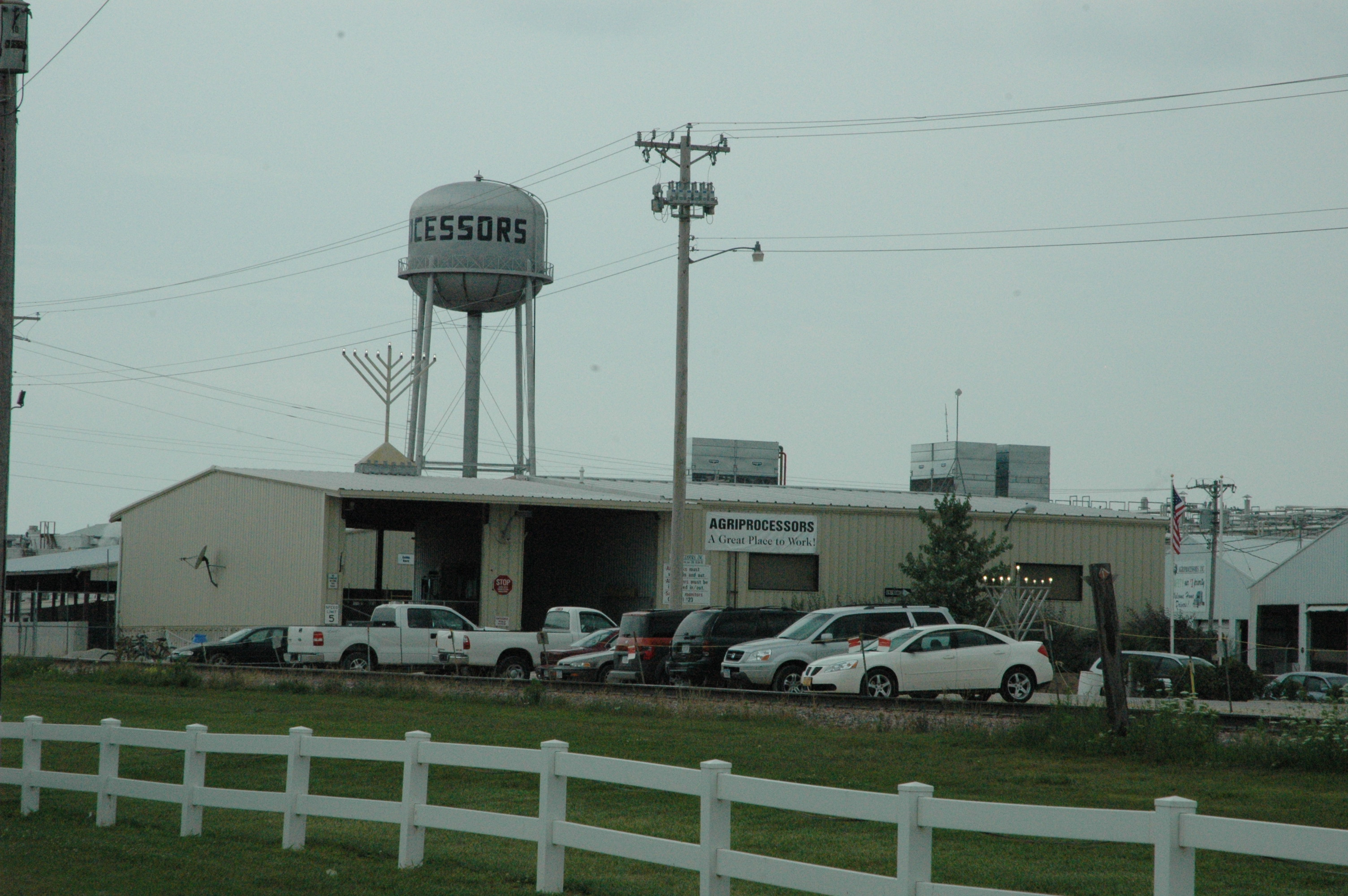
Agriprocessors plant in Postville, Iowa

Agriprocessors was the corporate identity of a slaughterhouse and meat-packaging factory based in Postville, Iowa, best known as a facility for the glatt kosher processing of cattle, as well as chicken, turkey, duck, and lamb. Agriprocessors' meat and poultry products were marketed under the brand Iowa Best Beef. Its kosher products were marketed under various labels, including Aaron’s Best, Shor Habor, Supreme Kosher, and Rubashkins.

The firm was founded and owned by Aaron Rubashkin, who purchased the meat-packing facility in 1987, and managed by two of his sons, Sholom Rubashkin and Heshy Rubashkin. Eventually it became the largest kosher meat-packing plant in the United States.

Agriprocessors faced accusations of mistreatment of cattle, pollution, and a series of alleged violations of labor law. In May 2008, the U.S. Immigration and Customs Enforcement (ICE) staged a raid of the plant, and arrested nearly 400 illegal immigrant workers. Agriprocessors plants stopped operating in October 2008, and the firm filed for bankruptcy on November 5 of the same year. Sholom Rubashkin as the highest ranking day-to-day corporate officer was found guilty of federal financial fraud and sentenced to 27 years in prison in June 2010, and was let free after U.S. President Donald Trump commuted his prison sentence on December 20, 2017.

The Agriprocessors plant was bought at auction in July 2009 by SHF Industries and has resumed production under the new name Agri Star.

== History ==
In the 1980s Aaron Rubashkin, a Russian-born Lubavitcher Hasidic butcher from Brooklyn, decided to take advantage of economic structural changes to bring mass-production to the kosher meat production business. In 1987 he bought an abandoned slaughterhouse outside Postville, a town undergoing a major employment crisis in northeastern Iowa and opened a processing plant creating some 350 jobs. He sent two of his sons to Postville to oversee day-to-day operations. Sholom Rubashkin, the second youngest, served as CEO, and Heshy Rubashkin, the youngest, as vice president of marketing and sales. In 1992, Agriprocessors added poultry to its offerings. At its peak the plant employed over 800 people, slaughtering more than 500 head of cattle each day in kosher production. The sales, according to numbers given to Cattle Buyers Weekly, rose from $80 million in 1997 to $180 million in 2002 and may have reached $250 million or more.

Rubashkin brought modern industrial methods to what has historically been a small, almost boutique craft, developing retail-ready glatt kosher products being sold both in supermarkets and in small, local grocery stores and meat markets around the United States. Agriprocessors was the largest (glatt) kosher meat producer in the United States and the only one authorized by Israel's Orthodox rabbinate to export beef to Israel.

In the 20 years it operated in Postville, Agriprocessors had a major impact on the town, creating new jobs, attracting immigrants from many different countries, and bringing an influx of Orthodox Jews to a part of the United States where Jews had been practically unknown.

The Rubashkin family opened another processing plant for bison, cattle and lamb called Local Pride Plant in conjunction with the Oglala Lakota native-American tribe of the Pine Ridge Indian Reservation in Gordon, Nebraska in 2006 employing some 100 locals. The presence of the plant near an Indian reservation provided considerable tax breaks for Rubashkin. Governor Dave Heineman presented a $505,000 gratuity check to Rubashkin on behalf of the city of Gordon, as part of an incentive package that brought the factory to the town.

Agriprocessors had two distribution sites, one in Brooklyn, New York, and one in Miami, Florida, both managed by members of the Rubashkin family. It also operated slaughter facilities in South America.

== Controversies ==
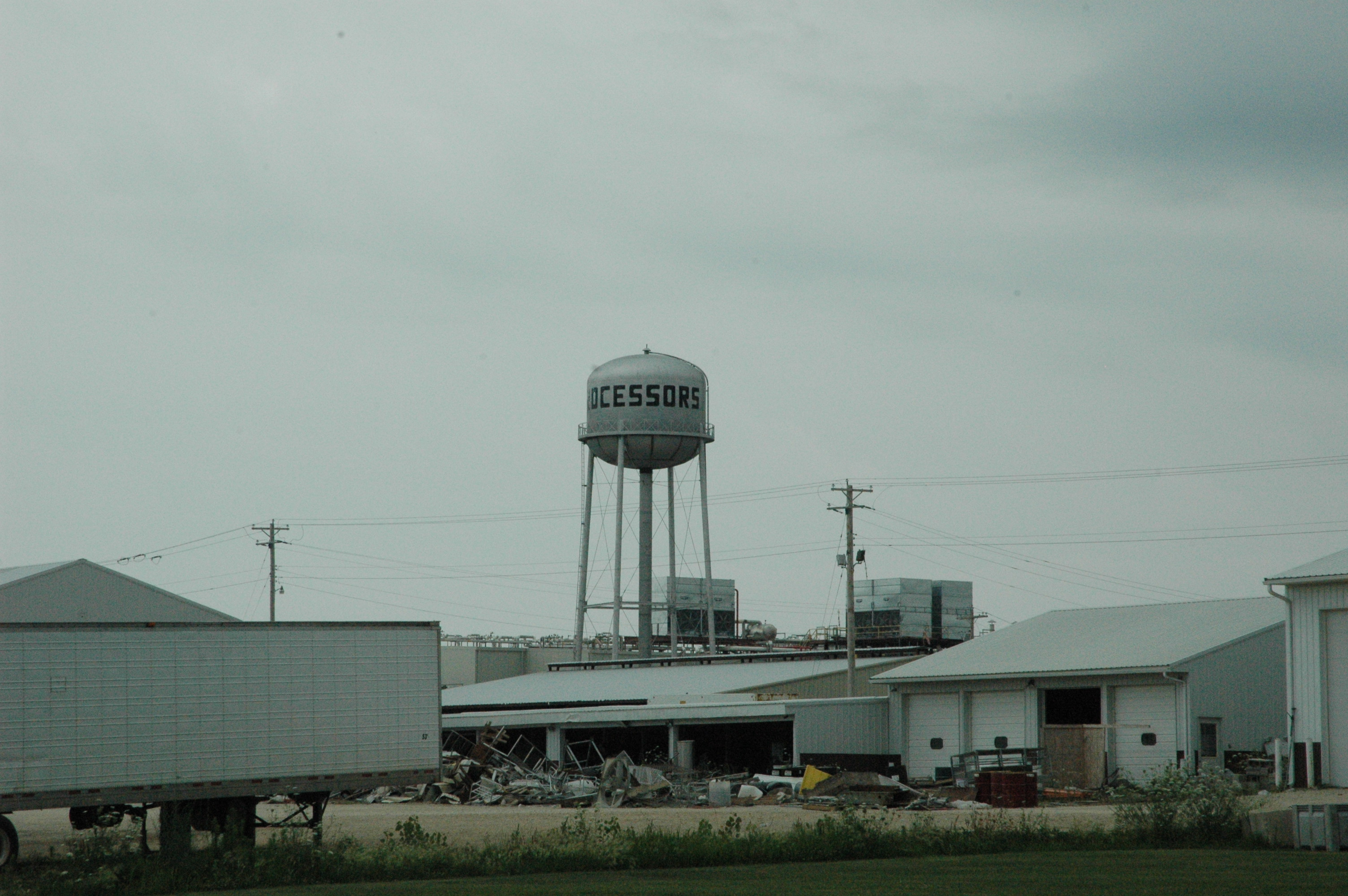
Agriprocessors plant, backside

The Agriprocessors plants have often been controversial because of frequent citations for illegal practices such as animal abuse, food safety violations, violations of environmental laws, child labor laws, and the recruitment of illegal immigrants and inducing them to work in often dangerous conditions at illegal wages.

The controversies have also split the Jewish communities, raised questions of Jewish ethics, and brought about a new consciousness for a Jewish way of eating beyond fulfilling the technical requirements of kashrut.

=== Animal abuse ===
In late 2004, People for the Ethical Treatment of Animals (PETA) released a video filmed undercover at Agriprocessors, showing gory details of cattle having their tracheas and esophagi ripped out of their necks and surviving for minutes after shechita (ritual slaughter). Noted animal welfare expert and meat scientist Dr. Temple Grandin called Agriprocessors procedures an "atrocious abomination" and worse than anything she had ever seen in over 30 kosher abattoirs.

Jewish authorities were split, with former Chief Rabbi of Ireland, David Rosen, and Shechita UK, along with many non-Orthodox rabbis from the Conservative movement, criticizing Agriprocessors, while Orthodox kashrut organizations continued to stand by the kashrut of the meat. Under pressure from the Agriculture Department, the Orthodox Union kosher certification authority, and Israel's chief rabbinate, the plant changed its practices.

In 2005 an internal report from the USDA not only held that Agriprocessors engaged in acts of inhumane slaughter, but that USDA inspectors were sleeping on the job, playing computer games, and had accepted bribes of free meat to ignore violations at the plant.

On June 27, 2006, at the suggestion of Rabbi Menachem Genack of the Orthodox Union, Dr. Grandin toured the facility. According to the Orthodox Union, Dr. Grandin was satisfied with what she saw. In 2008, though, Grandin reported that Agriprocessors had again become "sloppy" in their slaughter operation and was "in the bottom 10%" of slaughterhouses.

Another PETA undercover video, reportedly taken on August 13, 2008, showed violations of the Humane Methods of Livestock Slaughter Act, including the use of saw-like, multiple, hacking cuts in the necks of still-conscious animals. Dr. Grandin said the second cuts would “definitely cause the animal pain.” The episode led Grandin to state that slaughterhouse visits were useless for determining proper animal treatment. Grandin suggested that Agriprocessors install internet video cams on the killing floor for constant, independent, oversight.

=== Pollution ===
In 2004, city authorities started an investigation against Agriprocessors due to complaints from local residents that the firm routinely deposited untreated effluent into local rivers in breach of regulations. On August 31, 2006, Agriprocessors signed a consent decree where they essentially admitted discharging untreated slaughtering wastewater into the Postville sewer system, in violation of federal and Iowa state law and paid a $600,000 fine for violating waste-water regulations. Untreated wastewater from abattoirs is a heavy burden on wastewater treatment plants because of its high biochemical oxygen demand and high concentration of FOG (Fats, oils, and grease) which can form insoluble plaques in sewage pipes.

=== Labor relations ===
In September 2005, workers at Agriprocessors’ distribution site in Brooklyn voted to join the United Food and Commercial Workers union. The company did not recognize the vote, arguing that it was invalid because management had discovered that many of the workers who participated were in the US illegally, making their votes invalid despite protection granted undocumented workers in the National Labor Relations Act. A National Labor Relations Board judge decided against the company and ordered it to recognize the vote. Workers alleged that Agriprocessors paid low wages, failed to pay overtime and immediately terminated employment of workers who complained about conditions or wages.

On August 20, 2008, Jewish employees at Agriprocessors were reported to have staged a 30-minute walkout over delayed payment of wages and other compensation issues.

In October 2008, the Iowa Labor Commission fined Agriprocessors $9.99 million for various violations of state labor law, including illegally deducting money from employees for safety equipment and failing to pay employees.

=== Anti-competitive practices ===
A December 2008 story in the Village Voice featured allegations of sharp business practices by the Rubashkins: intimidating rivals (with threats of physical violence), manipulation of the kosher certification system, collusion with suppliers to withhold supplies from competitors, etc.

=== Federal immigration raid ===
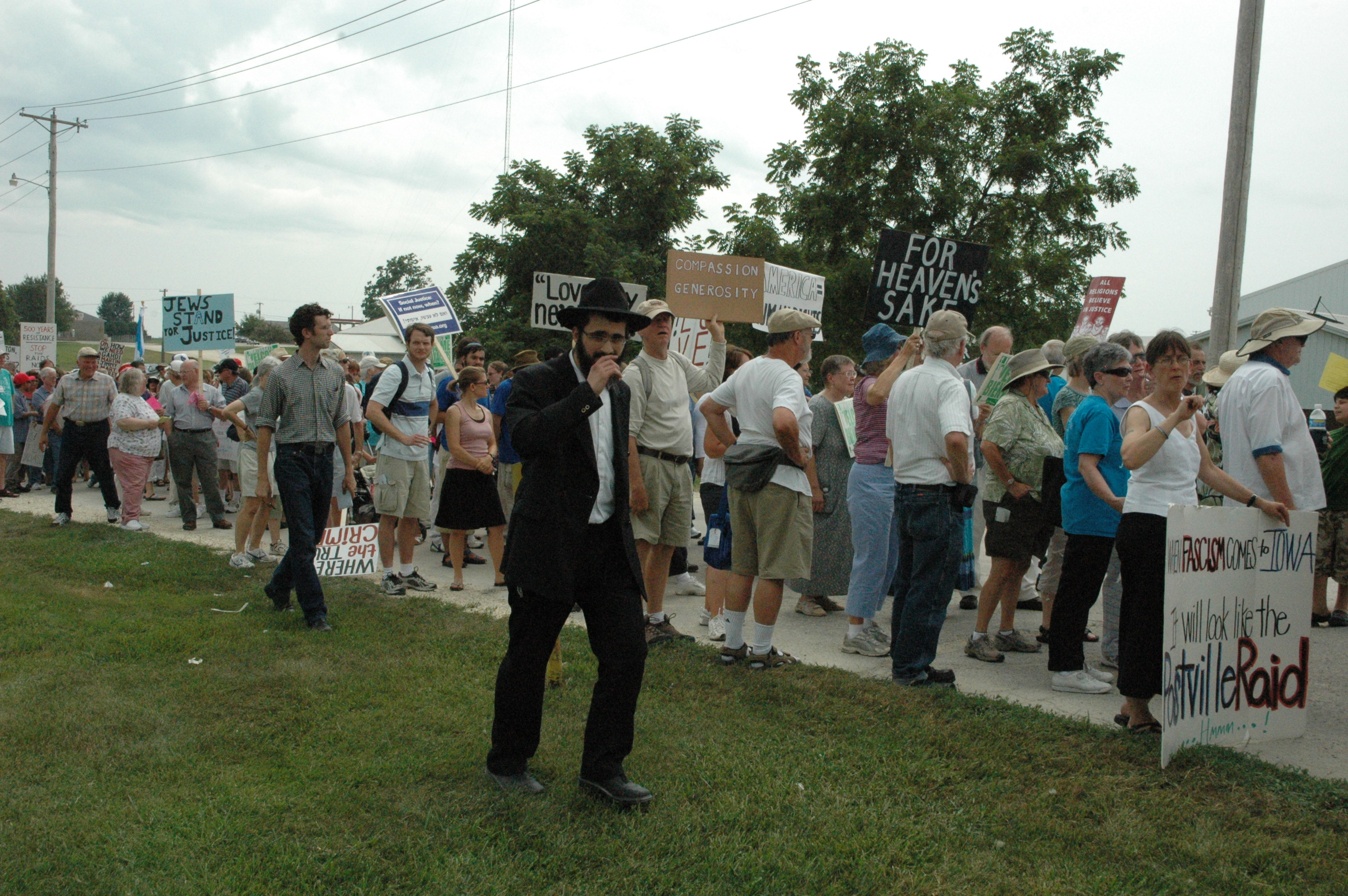
Protest against raid and crackdown on illegal employees

On 12 May 2008, U.S. Immigration and Customs Enforcement (ICE) staged a raid that was described as “largest criminal worksite enforcement operation in U.S. history”. Federal authorities arrested 389 immigrant workers during the raid, 305 of them on criminal charges, 297 were sentenced on federal felony charges for fraud-related offenses. ICE spokesman Tim Counts said that “the raid was aimed at seeking evidence of identity theft, stolen Social Security numbers and for people who are in the country illegally”. According to the U.S. attorney's office for the Northern District of Iowa, those arrested “include 290 Guatemalans, 93 Mexicans, 2 Israelis and 4 Ukrainians”.

Sources quoted in the affidavit and application for search warrant alleged the existence of a methamphetamine laboratory at the slaughterhouse, and that employees carried weapons to work. However, later press reports do not indicate that a methamphetamine laboratory was found during the search.

In late July, members of the Congressional Hispanic Caucus met with workers and community leaders, after a United States House of Representatives' subcommittee had heard testimony about the raid and its impact on the families and the town, and a rally with some 1,500 participants, organized by the Jewish Council on Urban Affairs, Jewish Community Action and St. Bridget's Roman Catholic Church was held in Postville in support of the detained Agriprocessors workers and their families.

The Rubashkin family was reported to have denied any criminal activity; Aaron Rubashkin said that “he had no idea that his workers were illegal and that they had produced what appeared to be legitimate work documents”. Nevertheless, he announced shortly after the raid that he intends to replace his son as the company's CEO. Sholom Rubashkin remained in charge though. He was finally replaced as CEO in September 2008 by Bernard Feldman, a New York attorney who had worked as counsel for the family, after child labor charges against Aaron and Sholom Rubashkin had been announced, and the Orthodox Union had threatened to withdraw their kosher certification.

The ICE raid left the company lacking employees, and it hired Labor Ready to supply "about 150 workers", but these workers stopped working because of alleged safety issues. The Jacobson Staffing company took the job of staffing the plant shortly thereafter. In June 2008, Agriprocessors began hiring workers from homeless shelters in Texas to replace employees detained in the federal immigration raid.

=== Public relations ===
In May 2008, following the federal immigration raid, PostvilleVoices.com, a site that claimed to be "a blog by people who live and work in Postville" and defended the firm's hiring practices, saying that "the people that run Agriprocessors are good, decent, honest people". After Postville residents suspected that this was a case of “astroturfing”, Getzel Rubashkin, son of Sholom Rubashkin, admitted he and two friends created the site.

In June 2008, Agriprocessors retained Jim Martin, a former U.S. Attorney, as the company's outside CCO, hired 5W Public Relations to repair its public image, and Lubicom, a kosher consulting and PR firm headed by Menachem Lubinsky, to present its case to the New York Jewish community. Lubinsky was quoted as saying he “expected 5W to deal with negative publicity and blogs”. Shortly thereafter, suspicious posts defending the company appeared on Jewish blogs critical of the company. Shmarya Rosenberg, author of the Failed Messiah blog, uncovered that two posts under the name of Rabbi Morris Allen of Hechsher Tzedek, a critic of Agriprocessors, were part of a sockpuppeting scheme. Similar comments impersonating Rabbi Allen were found on the websites of the Jewish Telegraphic Agency (JTA) and Vos Iz Neias. Ronn Torossian, CEO of 5W, admitted that a “senior staff member failed to be transparent in dealing with client matters.”

=== Comments by Iowa Governor ===
In August 2008, Iowa Governor Chet Culver commented on Agriprocessors:

Before the federal raid, Agriprocessors already had a history of sanctions by Iowa’s state regulatory agencies for water pollution, as well as health and safety law violations. Alarming information about working conditions at the Postville plant - including allegations ranging from the use of child labor in prohibited jobs to sexual and physical abuse by supervisors; from the nonpayment of regular and overtime wages to the denial of immediate medical attention for workplace injuries - brought to national attention by the raid forces me to believe that, in contrast to our state’s overall economic-development strategy, this company’s owners have deliberately chosen to take the low road in its business practices.

He also directed Iowa state agencies to prohibit Agriprocessors from listing their jobs on state job lists, and ordered his Attorney General to prosecute all violations backed by sufficient evidence.

== Criminal charges and trials ==
Following the May 2008 raid, federal prosecutors arrested former CEO Sholom Rubashkin, and brought charges against him and other former corporate officers and managers.

=== Child labor ===
On September 9, 2008, Agriprocessors, Aaron and Sholom Rubashkin, and two other managers were each charged in violations of child labor laws. In accordance with Iowa law, one charge was filed for every violation for every worker for every day that the specific violation happened, leading to a total of 9311 misdemeanor charges.

Sholom Rubashkin went to trial on these charges in state court on May 4, 2010. After a five-week trial he was found not guilty of all 67 charges of child labor violations by the Black Hawk County District Court jury in Waterloo, Iowa on June 7, 2010. The jury rejected, after about 12 hours of deliberations, prosecutors’ arguments that Sholom Rubashkin had seen many warning signs that child laborers were working at the Agriprocessors plant, though the corporation itself plead guilty to 83 charges of child labor violations.

=== Immigration cases ===
The conviction within four days of 297 Agriprocessors employees arrested by the ICE in May 2008 on criminal charges that included using false documents and unlawfully reentering the United States marked a “significant shift in immigration-enforcement policy toward criminalizing what were previously administrative violations” of the George W. Bush administration.

On November 23, 2009 Sholom Rubashkin's second trial on 72 immigration charges was canceled following the government's request to dismiss. In its motion to dismiss, the U.S. Attorneys Office said any conviction on the immigration charges would have no impact upon his sentence, writing, “dismissal will avoid an extended and expensive trial, conserve limited resources, and lessen the inconvenience to witnesses.” Federal Judge Linda R. Reade dismissed the immigration charges without prejudice.

=== Financial fraud ===
In November 2009, Sholom Rubashkin was convicted in U.S. District Court in Dubuque, Iowa, before Judge Linda R. Reade of 86 charges of financial fraud, including bank fraud, mail and wire fraud and money laundering. Prosecutors had claimed the company intentionally defrauded St. Louis-based First Bank on a revolving $35 million loan by creating fake invoices, inflating the value of the company.

On March 3, 2010, Judge Reade denied Rubashkin's motion for dismissal of the financial corruption charges and a request for a new trial.

On June 22, 2010, Rubashkin was sentenced to 27 years in prison. Prosecutors had asked for a 25-year sentence, Rubashkin's attorney for a six-year term. Rubashkin was also ordered to make $26,852,152.51 in restitution, special assessments of $8,600 were imposed, and he must serve a five-year term of supervised release after the prison term. His lawyers filed an appeal. In October 2010, Judge Reade rejected Sholom Rubashkin's motion for a new trial.

== Bankruptcy ==
On November 5, 2008 Agriprocessor filed for Chapter 11 bankruptcy. Factors cited included a loss of most of the workforce due to the May 2008 immigration raid, declining demand for the firm's products, and increased costs in the aftermath of the raid. The Associated Press reported that “Agriprocessors in its bankruptcy filing said the company owed $50 million to $100 million to creditors. The move appears to be an effort to pre-empt foreclosure by a St. Louis bank, which sued Agriprocessors for defaulting on a $35 million loan”.

In December, the bankruptcy court approved a $2.5 million loan for Agriprocessors to allow it to resume poultry processing through at least January 9, 2009 (about 750,000 chickens). The company was run by Chapter 11 bankruptcy trustee Joseph E. Sarachek of Triax Capital Advisors.

Agriprocessor's problems led to a shortage of kosher meat and higher prices nationwide. Empire Kosher, the largest US producer of kosher poultry, doubled its production capacity in response.

Agriprocessors was bought at auction in July 2009 by SHF Industries, a company formed by Canadian plastics manufacturer Hershey Friedman, an observant Orthodox Jew, and his son-in-law, Daniel Hirsch. The plant has resumed business under the new name Agri Star Meat & Poultry, LLC.

== Media ==
The town of Postville and Agriprocessors have been widely covered by the media in the US and Israel, particularly since the ICE raid in May 2008, mostly focusing on the Jewish element. Postville and Agriprocessors are also the subject of two books, a play, documentary films and an episode of American Greed.

Postville: A Clash of Cultures in Heartland America by journalist Stephen G. Bloom, was published in 2000, the documentary film Postville: When Cultures Collide based on it was released in 2001. Postville U.S.A.: Surviving Diversity in Small-Town America, written by Mark Grey and Michele Devlin, sociologists at the University of Northern Iowa, together with Aaron Goldsmith, a Lubavitcher Hasid and former member of the Postville City Council, came out in 2009, as well as the documentary film on the ICE-raid abUSed. In the same year, seven men who were arrested in the raid wrote a play in Spanish, la Historia de Nuestras Vidas (The Story of Our Lives) and performed it at Lutheran churches in Decorah, IA and Minneapolis.

On March 23, 2011 CNBC's American Greed aired an episode related to this story entitled "The Slaughter House".

Rubashkin himself wrote a book explaining his side of the story in 2021.
