= Postville (disambiguation) =

Postville may also refer to:

== Places ==
Canada

- Postville, Newfoundland and Labrador

United States

- Postville, Iowa
- Postville, Wisconsin

== Culture ==
- Postville: A Clash of Cultures in Heartland America, a religious studies book
