= YWN =

YWN or ywn may refer to:

- Yeshiva World News, an Orthodox Jewish online news publication
- YWN, the former IATA code for Winisk Airport, Ontario, Canada
- ywn, the ISO 639-3 code for Yawanawá language, western Amazonia
- A US Navy hull classification symbol: Water barge, non-self propelled (YWN)
