= Postville raid =

2008 immigration raid in Iowa

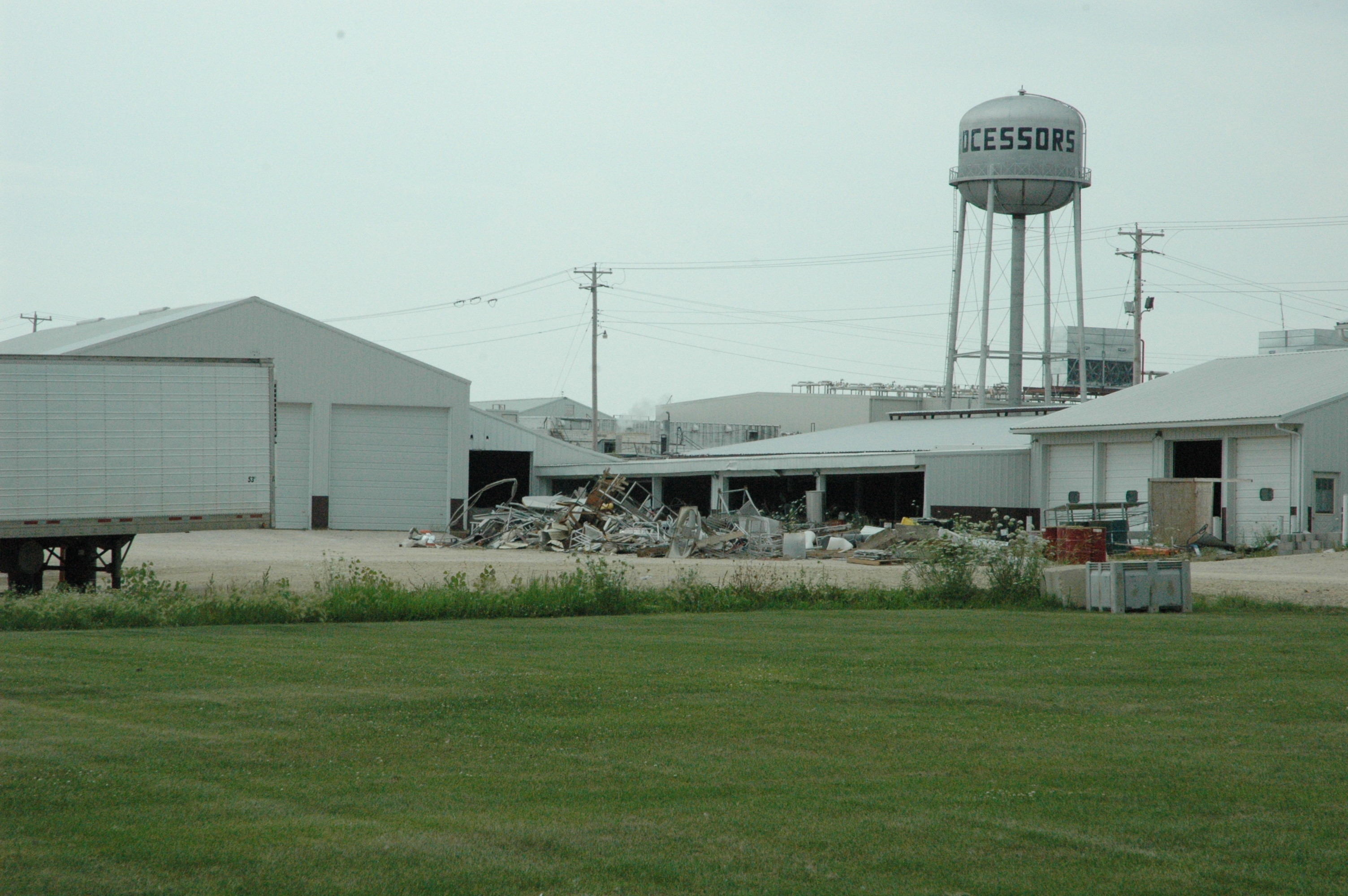
- Date: May 12, 2008
- Venue: Agriprocessors, Inc., kosher slaughterhouse and meat packing plant
- Location: Postville, Iowa; 43°05′12″N 91°34′55″W
- Type: Raid
- Participants: United States Immigration and Customs Enforcement
- Arrests: 398
- Convicted: 300
- Charges: Conspiracy to harbor illegal immigrants, aggravated identity theft, and child labor law violations
- Sentence: Between 60 days and 41 months

The Postville raid was a raid at the Agriprocessors, Inc., kosher slaughterhouse and meat packing plant in Postville, Iowa, on May 12, 2008, during George W. Bush's Presidency executed by the United States Immigration and Customs Enforcement (ICE) division of the Department of Homeland Security together with other agencies.

On that day, ICE deployed 900 agents and arrested 398 employees, 98% of whom were Latino. According to reports at the time, "agents used presumed race/ethnicity to identify suspected undocumented immigrants, allegedly handcuffing all employees assumed to be Latino until their immigration status was verified." Men were detained at the National Cattle Congress in Waterloo, Iowa, women were detained in county jails, and detainees were chained together and arraigned in groups of 10 for felony charges of aggravated identity theft, document fraud, use of stolen Social Security numbers, and related offenses.

Some 300 were convicted on the document fraud charges within four days as part of a plea bargain. In total 297 of them served a five-month prison sentence before being deported. The Supreme Court later ruled that undocumented workers cannot be charged with aggravated identity theft unless it was established that they knew that they had used an authentic Social Security number, prompting calls by some immigration attorneys and members of Congress to dismiss previous convictions against immigrants for aggravated identity theft and consider dismissing the guilty pleas sought against the Postville workers.

Several employees, including lower- and middle-level managers, were convicted on charges of conspiracy to harbor illegal immigrants, aggravated identity theft, and child labor law violations, among others, serving prison sentences between 60 days and 41 months. Neither the owner, Aaron Rubashkin, nor his sons Heshy and plant chief executive Sholom, who were in charge of the management of Agriprocessors, were convicted of immigration or labor law violations, although both Aaron and Sholom were initially charged with 9,311 counts of child labor law violation, for which they could have faced over 700 years in prison if found guilty. All charges against Aaron were dropped right before the trial was scheduled to begin, and after a five-week trial Sholom was acquitted on all charges of violating child labor laws. His case was later completely expunged from Iowa state records. Financial irregularities brought to light by the raid and subsequent investigations led to a conviction of Sholom on bank fraud and related charges.

Sholom was sentenced to 27 years in prison, but this led to an outcry by a bipartisan group of more than 100 former high-ranking and distinguished Department of Justice (DOJ) officials, prosecutors, judges, and legal scholars who expressed concern with the evidentiary proceedings in his case as well as with the severity of his sentence. On December 20, 2017, President Donald Trump commuted his sentence to time served, and his trial on immigration charges was canceled.

== Raid ==
With helicopters, buses and vans, hundreds of federal officials from ICE, together with agents and officers of other federal, state, and local agencies, raided the meat packing plant in the morning hours of May 12, 2008, seizing company records and arresting 398 individuals. According to the U.S. attorney's office for the Northern District of Iowa, those arrested included "290 Guatemalans, 93 Mexicans, 2 Israelis and 4 Ukrainians". Eighteen were juveniles.

According to a retired federal agent, a raid on Agriprocessors expected to lead to the arrest of about 100 illegal workers, mostly from Eastern Europe, had been planned in 2000, and canceled at the last moment over political concerns.

The 2008 raid was planned for months. An affidavit the Homeland Security Department filed in court before the raid cited "...the issuance of 697 criminal complaints and arrest warrants against persons believed to be current employees," and to have acted criminally. The affidavit cited unnamed sources who alleged that the company employed 15-year-old children, that supervisors helped cash checks for workers with false documents, and that they also pressured workers without documents to purchase vehicles and to register them in other names. It also cited a case in which a supervisor blindfolded a Guatemalan worker and allegedly struck him with a meat hook, causing no serious injury. Sources quoted in the affidavit and application for search warrant also alleged the existence of a methamphetamine laboratory at the slaughterhouse, and that employees carried weapons to work. Later press reports omit to indicate whether a methamphetamine laboratory was found during the search.

The arrested workers were taken to a nearby fairground, the National Cattle Congress in Waterloo, Iowa, where they were charged with aggravated identity theft, a criminal offense that carries a mandatory two years sentence, and briefed on their rights and options. The immigrant workers, most of them without prior criminal records, were offered a plea agreement in exchange for a guilty plea to lesser charges. In total, 297 accepted the agreement and pleaded guilty to document fraud. In an expedited procedure known as "fast track," hearings were scheduled over the course of the following three days, in which the judges took guilty pleas from the defendants, who were bound by handcuffs at the wrists as well as chains from their upper torso to their ankles, in groups of ten, and sentenced them immediately, five at a time. Most of the workers were sentenced to five months in prison and were deported afterwards. Before this raid, undocumented people who had no prior records were usually not criminally charged in the aftermath of a raid, and were instantly deported on civil immigration violations. Forty-one of those arrested were allowed to remain in the US, being granted a special visa, known as a "U-visa" (see 'also' "United States visas"), for those who suffered violent abuse.

The Rubashkin family, ultra-Orthodox Jews of the Lubavitcher hasidic movement, who owned and operated Agriprocessors, has denied any knowledge of criminal activity. Aaron Rubashkin, the owner of the company, said that he had no idea that his workers were in the US illegally and that they had produced what appeared to be legitimate work documents. Getzel Rubashkin, one of his grandsons who worked at the plant, was reported as saying: "Obviously some of the people here were presenting false documents. Immigration authorities somehow picked it up and they did what they are supposed to do, they came and picked them up. God bless them for it." According to ICE, costs of the raid totaled $5,211,092 as of August 21, 2008, not including costs associated with the U.S. Attorney's Office, the U.S. Department of Labor or local Postville authorities.

== Impact ==
The raid significantly affected the Postville community. The town, with a census population of only 2,273, lost a large percentage of its population due to the arrests. As a result of the difficulties Agriprocessors faced after the raid, the plant stopped slaughtering cattle in October 2008, and filed for bankruptcy on November 5, 2008. The City Council declared Postville a humanitarian and economic disaster area, but federal officials said the town did not qualify for help. Agriprocessors was bought at auction in July 2009 and has resumed production under the new name "Agri Star" on a smaller scale.

Several Agriprocessors employees and managers were indicted on charges of conspiracy to harbor illegal immigrants and were convicted. Related charges brought, though, against owner Aaron Rubashkin and his son the plant chief executive, Sholom, were dismissed. However, the financial irregularities that were brought to light by the raid and subsequent investigations led to a $35 million bank fraud charge against Sholom, who was convicted and sentenced to 27 years in prison.

=== Indictments and convictions ===
==== Guerrero-Espinoza and De La Rosa-Loera ====
On July 3, 2008, Juan Carlos Guerrero-Espinoza, supervisor of the beef kill department and three other departments, and Martin De La Rosa-Loera, supervisor of the poultry kill department and three other departments, were arrested at the Agriprocessors plant.

They were charged with aiding and abetting the possession and use of fraudulent identity documents, and encouraging aliens to reside illegally in the United States. Guerrero-Espinoza was also charged with aiding and abetting aggravated identity theft.

In late August 2008, Guerrero-Espinoza reached a deal with federal prosecutors and was sentenced to 36 months in federal prison. The plea deal allowed him to avoid deportation and to arrange for his wife and children to return to the US following his prison term. The sentence included a two-year mandatory ruling for aggravated identity theft. In March 2009, De La Rosa-Loera was sentenced to 23 months in federal prison.

After the Flores-Figueroa v. United States ruling of the Supreme Court issued on May 4, 2009, he made a request for the reduction of his sentence. Aggravated identity theft charges had formerly been dismissed against human resources employee Laura Althouse, supervisor Brent Beebe (one of two operations managers at the Agriprocessors plant), and Sholom Rubashkin, the motion contended. Both Guerrero-Espinoza and De La Rosa-Loera, after being released from jail, have gone back to work at the meatpacking plant under the new ownership.

==== Aaron Rubashkin, Sholom Rubashkin, Billmeyer, Althouse, and Freund ====
In September 2008, Aaron Rubashkin, his son Sholom Rubashkin, as well as the company's human resources manager, Elizabeth Billmeyer, and two office employees, Laura Althouse and Karina Freund, were charged for child labor violations. State child labor charges against Aaron Rubashkin were dropped, and he was never charged federally.

In October 2008, Althouse pleaded guilty to one count of conspiracy to harbor illegal aliens and one count of aggravated identity theft. She was sentenced to two years federal probation, Freund to one year of probation. Billmeyer was sentenced to one year and one day in prison, to be followed by two years of supervised release for harboring undocumented aliens and accepting counterfeit resident alien cards. After she agreed to plead guilty to state child labor charges under an agreement with the state, her sentence was reduced to eight months. Former human resources assistant Penny Hanson was sentenced to two years probation on January 7, 2010. In 2010, state child labor charges were dropped against former Agriprocessors supervisor Jeff Heasley, who had his case separated from the other defendants.

On October 30, 2008, Sholom Rubashkin was arrested and charged with conspiracy to harbor undocumented aliens for profit, aiding and abetting document fraud, and aiding and abetting aggravated identity theft. He was released on conditions that he wear a GPS ankle bracelet, limit his travel to the Northern District of Iowa, surrender his passport and his wife′s passport, and provide a $1 million appearance bond with $500,000 to be secured. On November 14, 2008, he was arrested again on a charge of a $35 million bank fraud.

==== Beebe ====
On November 21, 2008, Sholom Rubashkin, Brent Beebe, poultry managers Hosam Amara and Zeev Levi, and human resources employee Karina Freund were indicted on charges including conspiracy, harboring illegal aliens, aggravated identity theft, document fraud and bank fraud. Beebe pleaded guilty in January 2010 to conspiracy to commit document fraud as part of a plea agreement with the government. In the plea, Beebe admitted that he had conspired with Sholom (identified in the proceedings as a former vice president) and others a week before the May 12, 2008 immigration raid at the plant to buy fake identification documents for 19 employees. He was sentenced to 10 months in prison on May 26, 2010. The charges against Freund were dismissed.

==== Meltzer ====
On May 26, 2010, Mitch Meltzer, the plant′s former head accountant, was sentenced to 41 months in prison after his conviction on a federal conspiracy charge. In late September 2009, he admitted that he conspired with others to make false statements to a bank and that he signed false financial records that were used to mislead the banks. In addition to the prison term, Meltzer was ordered to pay $26.9 million in restitution.

Meltzer had been hired by the meat plant′s new owner after having been dismissed by Agriprocessors′ government-appointed trustee, and remained at the company for several months after he pleaded guilty to financial fraud.

==== Amara and Levi ====
Faced with federal charges, Amara and Levi fled the USA. Amara was arrested in Israel on March 31, 2011. After unsuccessful appeals to avoid extradition from Israel, Amara was returned to Cedar Rapids, Iowa for trial on May 3, 2013. He pleaded not guilty. He faced 25 counts related to harboring workers who were in the country illegally and two counts related to document fraud for conspiring to provide false immigration papers. His trial was set for July 1, 2013, but delayed until August 19 by U.S. Magistrate Jon Scoles. On August 29, 2013, Amara signed a plea deal, admitting that he "conspired with Agriprocessors CEO Sholom Rubashkin and other executives for at least five years before the raid to harbor immigrants 'knowing and in reckless disregard of the fact' they had come to the U.S. illegally." He pleaded guilty to one count of conspiring to harbor undocumented immigrants for profit, which carries a maximum penalty of 10 years in prison, though federal sentencing guidelines called for a shorter term. The other counts in the indictment were dismissed.

==== Sholom Rubashkin ====
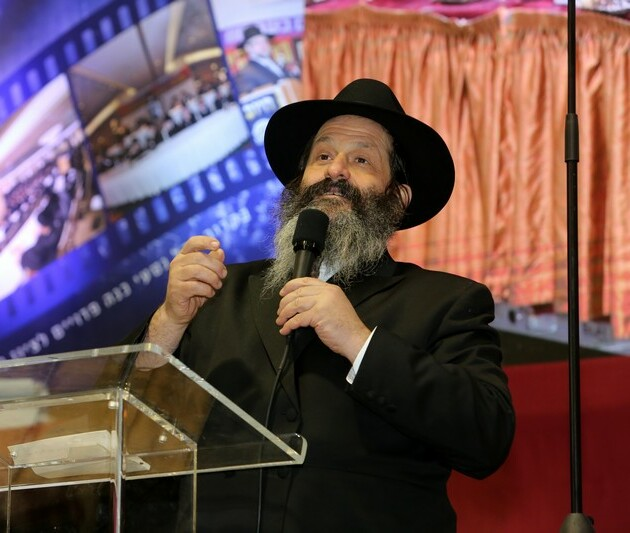
Sholom Rubashkin (2018)

On November 12, 2009, Sholom Rubashkin was convicted in federal court on 86 charges of financial fraud, including bank fraud, mail and wire fraud and money laundering. On June 22, 2010, he was sentenced to serve 27 years in prison and to make $27 million in restitution.

On November 23, 2009, Sholom Rubashkin′s second federal trial on 72 immigration charges was canceled. After winning the financial fraud conviction, federal prosecutors dismissed all immigration-related charges against him. In its motion to dismiss, the U.S. Attorneys Office said any conviction on the immigration charges would not affect his sentence, writing, "dismissal will avoid an extended and expensive trial, conserve limited resources, and lessen the inconvenience to witnesses." Without that trial, it is unlikely that much of the immigration-related evidence gathered at the Agriprocessors site following the raid, or much of the key witness testimony, will ever be publicly revealed.

On June 7, 2010, Sholom Rubashkin was acquitted in state court of knowingly hiring 29 underage workers at the plant.

On December 20, 2017, Sholom Rubashkin's sentence was commuted by President Trump. Rubashkin had served 8 years of his 27-year sentence.

==== Garcia ====
On June 30, 2010, Alvaro Julian Garcia Jr., aged 73, was sentenced to 60 days in jail followed by two years of supervised release, for having registered vehicles that were sold to undocumented workers in Postville between 2004 and 2006 as part of a vehicle title scheme.

=== Reactions ===
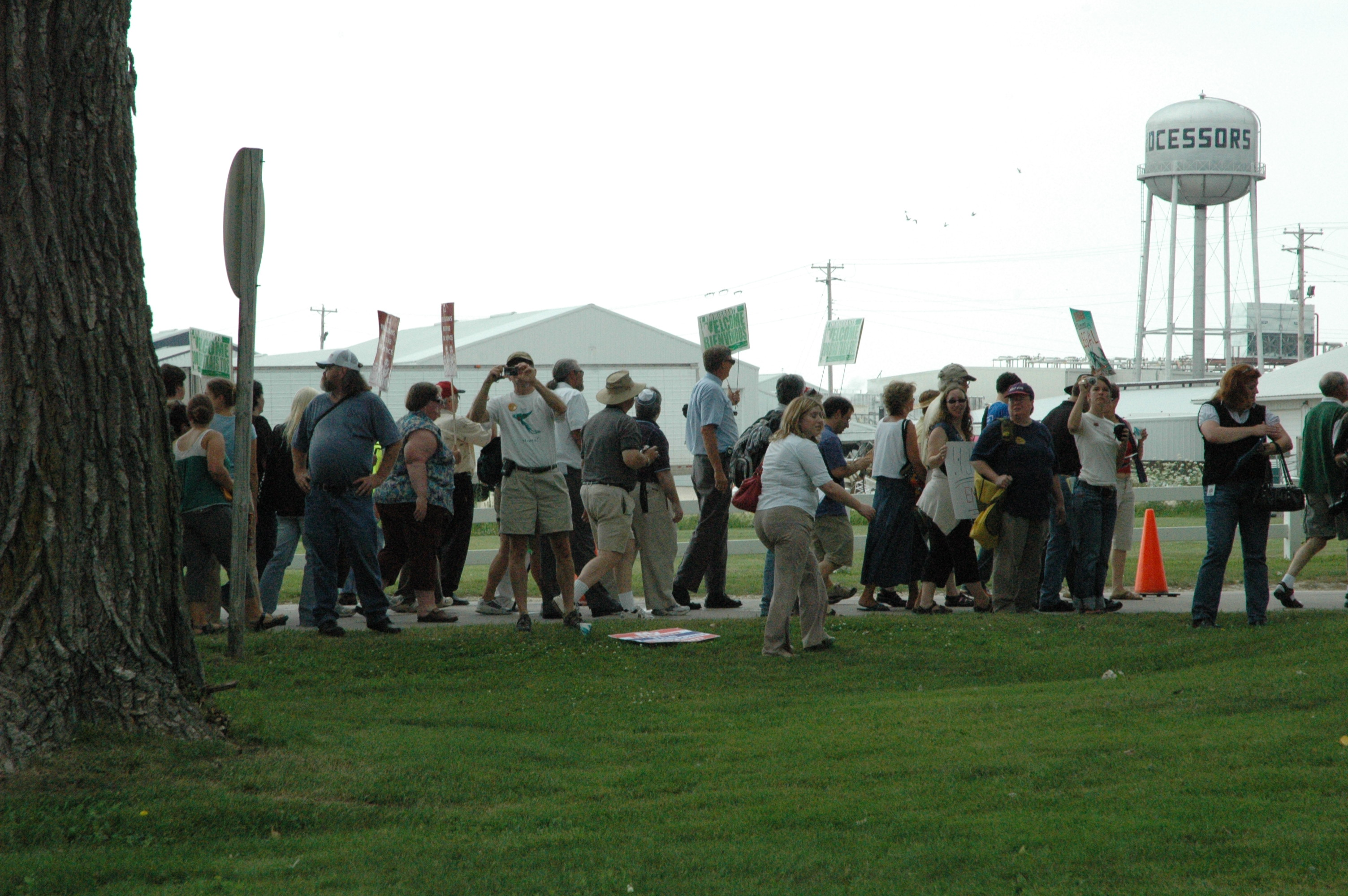
Protest rally on July 27, 2008

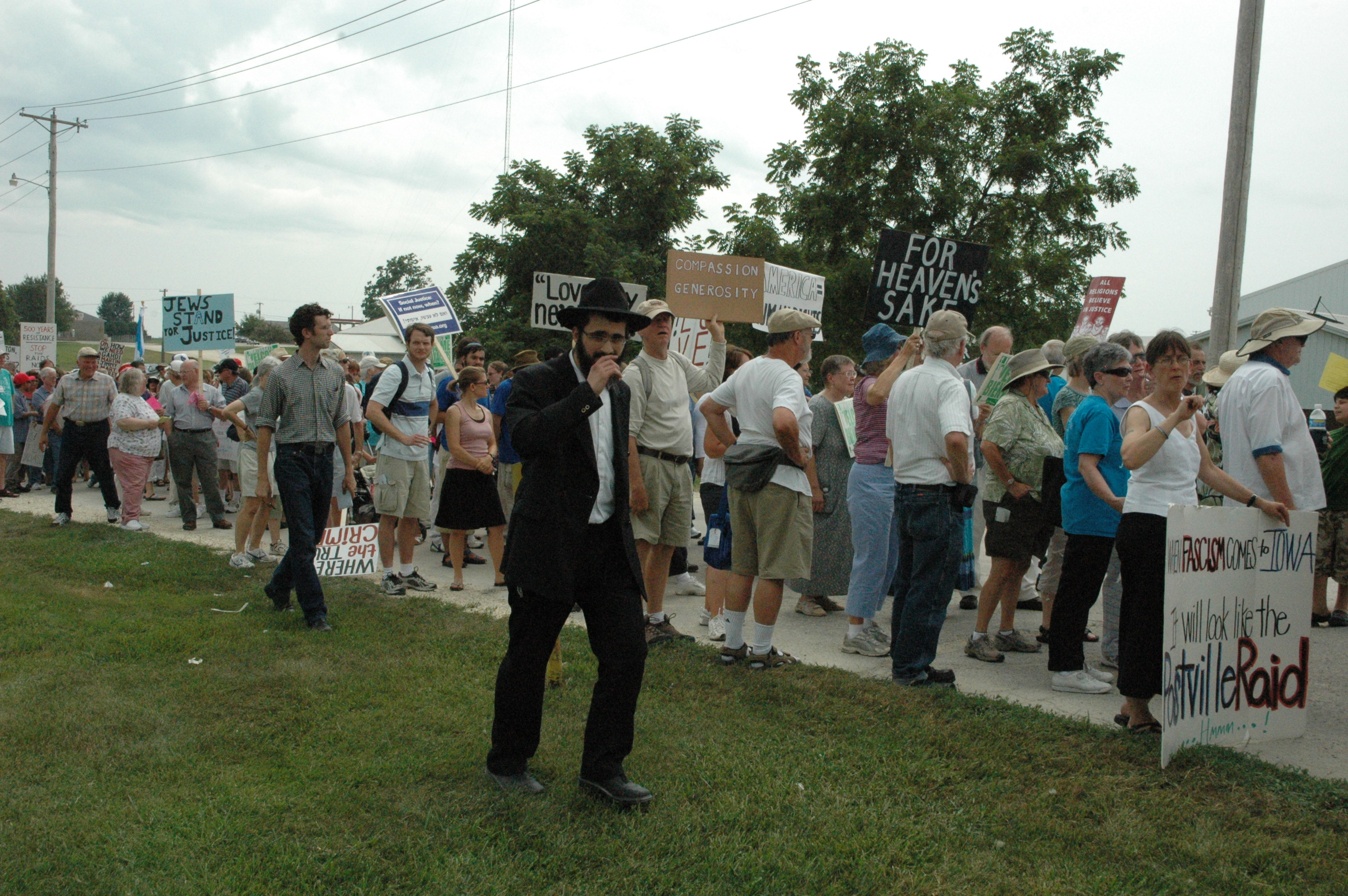
Protest rally on July 27, 2008

==== Initial protests, generally localized ====
On the day of the raid, up to 200 protesters had gathered at National Cattle Congress in Waterloo and later held a vigil outside its gates on behalf of the detainees. On July 27, 2008, a rally organized by St. Bridget's Catholic Church in Postville, Jewish Community Action of Saint Paul, Minnesota, and the Jewish Council on Urban Affairs of Chicago was held in Postville to protest working conditions in the plant, and to call for Congressional legislation to give legal status to immigrants illegally in the US. Members of the Congressional Hispanic Caucus met with Agriprocessors workers and community leaders in Postville. About 1,000 people, including Catholic clergy members, rabbis and Jewish activists, and Hispanic immigrants, held an interfaith service at St. Bridget's Catholic Church, and marched through the center of town to the entrance of the meatpacking plant.

The first anniversary of the raid was marked by a prayer vigil followed by a procession to the National Cattle Congress grounds on May 11, 2009 in Waterloo. The following day, a prayer service and vigil at St. Bridget's Catholic Church, followed by a procession to Agriprocessors, took place in Postville. Both events were attended by representatives of Christian and Jewish faiths, who demonstrated their solidarity and spoke out for immigration reform. Prayer vigils were also held on the second anniversary of the raid in Waterloo and Postville.

In "response to the humanitarian and economic disaster" created by the raid, the "Postville Response Coalition", composed of community organizations, the faith community, and city and county government officials, was founded in November 2008 to help individuals and families. It was dissolved on March 31, 2010, after the meatpacking plant had reopened under new ownership and the community began to recover from the raid and the subsequent closure of the plant. A new organization called "Postville First" was created through the impetus of the "Postville Response Coalition."

==== Reactions of political figures ====
Transcending in fairly short order its initial local impact, the raid received widespread and enduring national publicity.

Zoe Lofgren, Democratic member of the House of Representatives who chairs the House Judiciary Committee′s immigration panel, at the time spoke during a dedicated subcommittee hearing to criticize the raid for the treatment of the workers during the raid itself, for subsequent "coercion" of guilty pleas, and for targeting workers rather than employers. The American Civil Liberties Union (ACLU) has criticized the three-day series of court hearings in the aftermath of the raid, and has published a copy of a "script" that attorneys were given to use in discussing possible plea agreements with their clients. Officials from the office of United States Attorney Matt Dummermuth, whose staff assisted in the preparation of the documents used in the hearings, have defended the proceedings. Bob Teig, a spokesman for Dummermuth's office, noted that the scripts were used only to ensure that the individuals being charged with crimes "...were fully advised of their rights and fully understood the consequences of their decisions to plead guilty." The raid and prosecutions took place, moreover, while investigations of the Wage and Hour Division (WHD) of the Department of Labor (DOL) for possible violations of the Fair Labor Standards Act against Agriprocessors were under way. Concern was voiced that the ICE raid may have affected the ability of the Department of Labor to conduct its investigation of the workplace, and that workers able to assist in the investigation or victims of possible violations may have been among those arrested. Speaking in the same subcommittee hearing, Democratic Representative from Iowa Bruce Braley reported that ICE claimed to have "fully coordinated its activities with other Federal agencies, including the Department of Labor prior to the May 12 operation at the Agriprocessors facility," whereas the Department of Labor stated in a July 3 letter (from which he quoted a few brief phrases), "'the raid occurred without the prior knowledge or participation of the Wage and Hour Division ... no advance notice was given to WHD or any other Department of Labor agency prior to the raid.' In addition, the DOL letter states that the May 12 enforcement action 'changes the complexion of WHD's investigation of Agriprocessors.'" (The subcommittee split largely across party lines in its reaction to the events of the raid.)

Other lawmakers, as well as labor union representatives, criticized the Bush administration as disproportionately targeting workers instead of employers. Chet Culver, governor of Iowa, criticized Agriprocessors in a guest editorial on August 24, 2008, comparing it to Upton Sinclair′s 1906 novel The Jungle: "Alarming information about working conditions at the Postville plant ... brought to national attention by the raid forces me to believe that, in contrast to our state's overall economic-development strategy, this company's owners have deliberately chosen to take the low road in its business practices." One day later, then US senator from Illinois and presidential candidate Barack Obama spoke out against Agriprocessors' managers, without mentioning the company by name, while campaigning in Iowa. During Obama's first year as president, raids on workplaces declined (but on the other hand, deportations of migrants whose entry into the US had been illegal increased by nearly 10 percent from the last year of the Bush presidency).

==== Reactions of the Jewish community ====
Jewish organizations had voiced concern about Agriprocessors meat products meeting ethical standards of kashrut ever since the first criticisms of its slaughtering methods and working conditions were leveled, in large measure by the animal rights organization PETA, brought to the attention of the general public by The New York Times in November 2004, and notably to that of a Jewish readership by the newspaper The Forward in 2006. As a result of the already widespread attention, an ethically based certification for kosher products, updated and now called Magen Tzedek, had been introduced by Rabbi Morris Allen and then been endorsed by the Rabbinical Assembly, the international association of Conservative rabbis, in 2007.

Several of these organizations, reacting to the raid as well as to those earlier criticisms of the problematic practices engaged in by Agriprocessors, addressed anew questions of Jewish ethics, stressing the importance of the commandments (Hebrew: mitzvot) concerning the relationship between human beings (Hebrew: mitzvot bein adam l'chavero), alongside those between human beings and "the Omnipresent" (Hebrew: mitzvot bein adam la-Makom).

Hence, in the wake of the raid, Modern Orthodox rabbis met in Los Angeles on May 18, 2008 to put in motion the corresponding creation of a kosher certification (hechsher) serving to address ethical issues for their own congregations.

The United Synagogue of Conservative Judaism and the Rabbinical Assembly issued on May 22, 2008 a statement requesting "that consumers of kosher meat evaluate whether it is appropriate to buy and eat meat products produced by the Rubashkin's label," adding that "the allegations about the terrible treatment of workers employed by Rubashkin's have shocked and appalled members of the Conservative movement as well as all people of conscience. As kashrut seeks to diminish animal suffering and offer a humane method of slaughter, it is bitterly ironic that a plant producing kosher meat be guilty of inflicting any kind of human suffering." On May 23, 2008, the Jewish Labor Committee went further and "urged consumers of kosher meat products to seek alternatives to the Rubashkin labels" until Agriprocessors lives up "to the responsibilities of corporate citizenship, ends its campaign of worker abuse, and respects the rights of its employees including their legal right to union representation." The liberal Orthodox Jewish organization Uri L'Tzedek (English: "Giving Light to Righteousness"), founded in 2007, called for a boycott of Agriprocessors products. The boycott was lifted six weeks later, after Agriprocessors had appointed a former U.S. attorney as compliance officer and had promised changes in their treatment of workers, even though the management had not been replaced, contrary to the announcement made by the plant's owner immediately after the raid. In September 2008, with the first criminal charges having just been brought against Agriprocessors′ owner and managers, the Orthodox Union, the leading kosher certifier in the United States, threatened to withdraw its certification from the products of Agriprocessors, unless the company put a new management team in place.

Ultra-Orthodox organizations did not take part in the discussion over ethical issues raised by the raid. After Sholom Rubashkin's arrest, Orthodox rabbis showed their solidarity, but, according to the Forward, "most of the [ultra-]Orthodox rabbis who are supporting Rubashkin ... had never considered providing support to the immigrant workers. But Rabbi Shea Hecht, a Chabad rabbi ... said he wished he had done more in the raid′s immediate aftermath."

Student leaders Gilah Kletenik and Simcha Gross organized a panel at Yeshiva University in response to this raid. The discussion engaged questions about ethics, the laws of kashrut and communal responsibility.

==== Public health outcomes ====
The post-Postville raid environment was studied to determine whether racialized stressors may result in public health consequences. A publication by Nicole L Novak, Arline T Geronimus, and Aresha M Martinez-Cardos found that infants born to Latina mothers in the state of Iowa after the raid had a 24% greater chance of low birth weight when compared to infants born during the same period one year earlier. No such change was observed among infants born to White non-Latina mothers before and after the raid.

The raid provides a "natural experiment" in which to investigate the effects of targeted immigration enforcement on birth outcomes within a larger community. According to Novak et al, "The psychosocial, economic, communal and identity-based stressors activated by the Postville raid may have interfered with Latina mothers' neuroendocrine balance and coping resources, leaving infants vulnerable to a dysregulated endocrine environment." They conclude that the Postville raid can demonstrate the effect of psychosocial stressors on health, and that "exclusive immigration policies and their militarized enforcement exacerbate the racialized exclusion of Latinos in the USA, which may contribute to a cumulative health burden for immigrant and USA-born Latinos alike."

== In film ==
The consequences of the raid for undocumented workers and their families, many of whom were from Guatemala and Mexico, were documented in AbUSed: the Postville Raid, a 2011 documentary film by Guatemalan film director Luis Argueta.
