= Azi Paybarah =

American journalist

Azi Paybarah is a New York-based journalist who focuses on local politics. He worked as a reporter for the New York Press, the Queens Tribune and the New York Sun. In February 2011, Paybarah returned to The New York Observer which he had left a few months earlier, where he wrote for the daily blog, The Politicker. In September 2011 he joined the online news publication Capital as senior writer. Paybarah also hosts a political blog on the website of the local NPR station, WNYC.

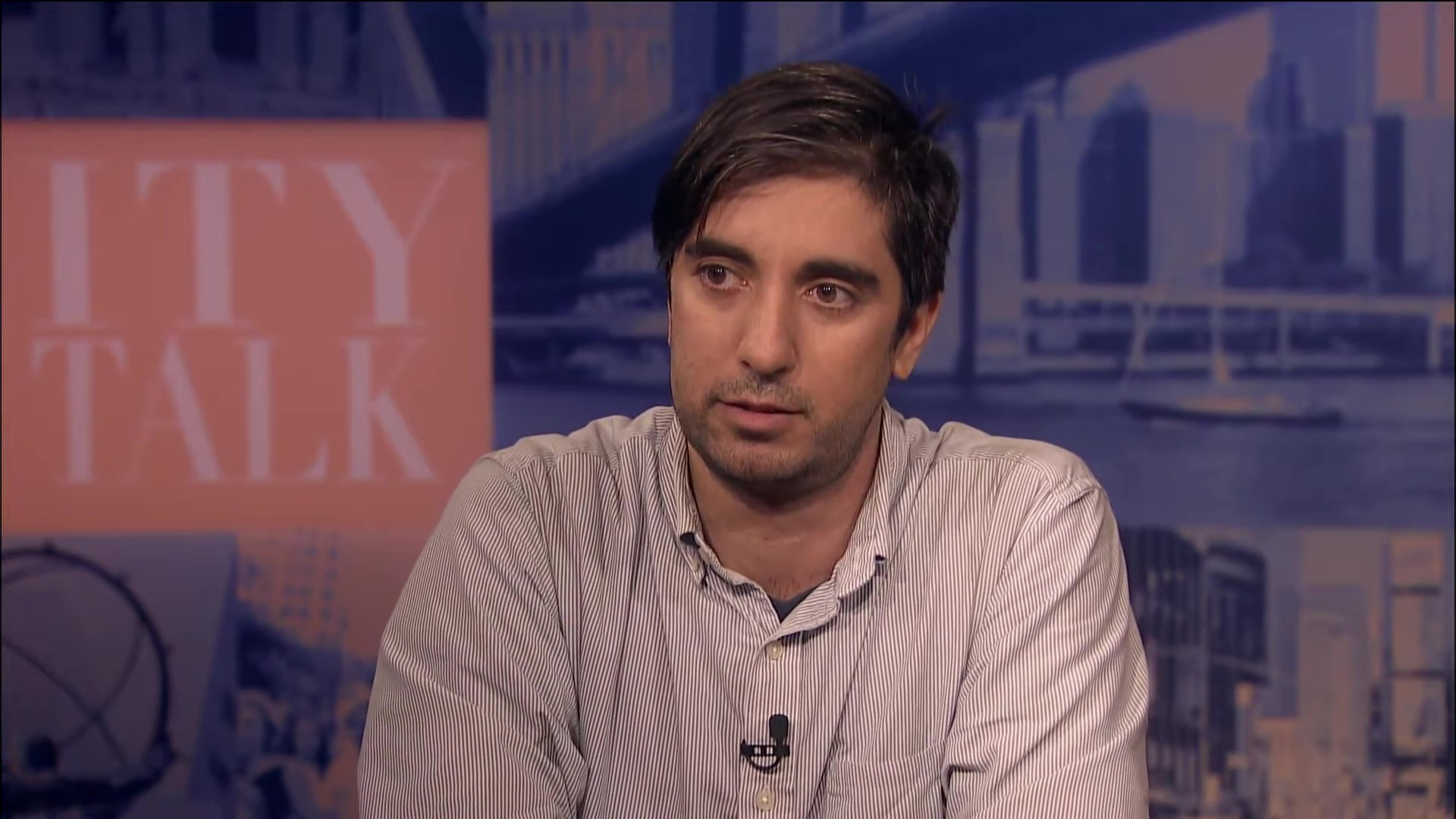
Paybarah on CUNY TV's City Talk, 2014

== Career ==
At times Paybarah will inform political colleagues or rivals of a controversial statement another politician has made to provoke a reaction. An example of this was when he informed others of congressional candidate David Weprin's statements in an interview for Vosizneias, one of the largest Orthodox Jewish websites in the United States, regarding the marriage equality law which allows gay and lesbian marriages in New York State.

In May 2009, Paybarah made headlines for being called "a disgrace" by New York mayor Michael Bloomberg for asking about the mayor's rationale for running for a third term. Though later in his campaign, Bloomberg described Paybarah as "brilliant", according to The New York Times.

In September 2010, he was named one of City Hall's "40 under 40" for being a young influential member of New York City politics.
