= National Cattle Congress =

Agricultural event held in Waterloo, Iowa

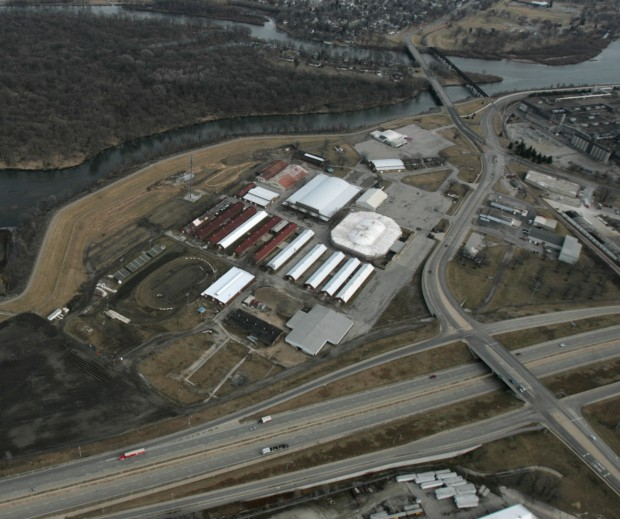
National Cattle Congress fairgrounds

The National Cattle Congress is an annual agricultural event held in Waterloo, Iowa. It was first held in 1910.

The Hippodrome and the Electric Park Ballroom are located on the National Cattle Congress grounds.

== History ==
Unlike other events such as the Iowa State Fair, Cattle Congress was held every year, even during World War II.

In the 1980s, the NCC organization started a greyhound racing business to attempt to generate additional revenue. This was a commercial failure, and the organization declared bankruptcy in 1993. The event was cancelled in 1994 as a result. The racetrack shut down in 1996 after a failed referendum to allow slot machines, and the facility was destroyed in 2018.

In 2008, the fairgrounds were used as a temporary holding facility for 260 illegal immigrants arrested in a raid in Postville, Iowa.

There was no convention in 2020 because of the COVID-19 pandemic, nor was there one in 1917–18 due to World War I.
