= Nate Driggers =

American basketball player (born 1973)

Personal information
- Born: October 12, 1973 (age 53) Chicago, Illinois
- Listed height: 6 ft 5 in (1.96 m)
- Listed weight: 215 lb (98 kg)

Career information
- High school: Corliss (Chicago, Illinois)
- College: Montevallo (1991–1995)
- NBA draft: 1995: undrafted
- Position: Shooting guard
- Number: 27

Career history
- 1995–1996: Quad City Thunder
- 1996–1997: La Crosse Bobcats
- 1996–1997: Boston Celtics

Career highlights
- NAIA Player of the Year (1995); Southern States Player of the Year (1995)
- Stats at NBA.com
- Stats at Basketball Reference

Nathan Allen Driggers (born October 12, 1973) is a retired American basketball player who played in the National Basketball Association (NBA) for the Boston Celtics. After becoming the all-time leading scorer and 1995 NAIA Player of the Year at the University of Montevallo in Alabama, Driggers appeared in 15 games for the NBA's Boston Celtics in the mid-1990s. He also played professionally in Australia, Belgium and France.

Driggers, who is the only NBA player to have played basketball for the University of Montevallo, scored a total of 36 points for a 1996–97 Celtics team that went 15–67.

Driggers was convicted of selling stolen guns in September 2017. He was sentenced to eight years in prison.

== Career statistics ==
Legend
GP	Games played	GS	Games started	MPG	Minutes per game
FG%	Field goal percentage	3P%	3-point field goal percentage	FT%	Free throw percentage
RPG	Rebounds per game	APG	Assists per game	SPG	Steals per game
BPG	Blocks per game	PPG	Points per game	**Bold**	Career high

=== NBA ===
==== Regular season ====
Year	Team	GP	GS	MPG	FG%	3P%	FT%	RPG	APG	SPG	BPG	PPG
1996–97	Boston	15	0	8.8	.302	.000	.714	1.5	.4	.2	.1	2.4
