= 1996–97 Boston Celtics season =

NBA basketball team season

- Head coach: M. L. Carr
- General manager: Jan Volk
- Owner: Paul Gaston
- Arena: Fleet Center

Results
- Record: 15–67 (.183)
- Place: Division: 7th (Atlantic); Conference: 15th (Eastern)
- Playoff finish: Did not qualify
- Stats at Basketball Reference

Local media
- Television: WSBK-TV; SportsChannel New England
- Radio: WRKO

The 1996–97 Boston Celtics season was the 51st season for the Boston Celtics in the National Basketball Association.

== Season summary ==
=== Off-season ===
Celebrating its 50th anniversary as one of the NBA's original franchises, the Celtics received the sixth overall pick in the 1996 NBA draft, and selected power forward Antoine Walker from the University of Kentucky. During the off-season, the team signed free agents Frank Brickowski and Marty Conlon.

For the season, the Celtics updated their primary logo of a leprechaun spinning a basketball, and smoking a cigar in front of a green circle, adding gold, black, brown and peach colors; the logo is still present as of 2026.

=== Regular season ===
With the addition of Walker and Conlon, the Celtics got off to a 4–8 start to the regular season, but then struggled losing 13 of their next 14 games as players like Dino Radja, Dana Barros, Dee Brown, Greg Minor and Pervis Ellison were all out for long stretches of the season due to injuries. The team suffered through their worst season ever, holding an 11–35 record at the All-Star break, posting a 13-game losing streak between February and March, and then posting a 10-game losing streak near the end of the season. The Celtics lost 34 of their final 38 games, finishing in last place in the Atlantic Division with a dreadful 15–67 record, which is currently the team's worst record in franchise history.

Walker averaged 17.5 points, 9.0 rebounds and 1.3 steals per game, and was named to the NBA All-Rookie First Team, while David Wesley averaged 16.8 points, 7.3 assists and 2.2 steals per game, and contributed 103 three-point field goals, and Rick Fox provided the team with 15.4 points, 5.2 rebounds, 3.8 assists and 2.2 steals per game, and with 101 three-point field goals. In addition, second-year forward Eric Williams contributed 15.0 points per game, and Todd Day provided with 14.5 points per game, and led the Celtics with 126 three-point field goals. Meanwhile, Radja averaged 14.0 points, 8.4 rebounds and 1.9 blocks per game in 25 games due to a left knee injury, Barros averaged 12.5 points and 3.4 assists per game in 24 games, Minor contributed 9.6 points per game in 23 games, Brown provided with 7.6 points, 3.2 assists and 1.5 steals per game in 21 games, and Conlon averaged 7.8 points and 4.4 rebounds per game.

During the NBA All-Star weekend at the Gund Arena in Cleveland, Ohio, Walker was selected for the NBA Rookie Game, as a member of the Eastern Conference Rookie team. Walker scored 20 points along with 9 rebounds and 2 steals, as the Eastern Conference defeated the Western Conference, 96–91. Walker also finished in fourth place in Rookie of the Year voting, while Wesley finished in eleventh place in Most Improved Player voting, and Fox finished tied in sixth place in Defensive Player of the Year voting.

The Celtics finished 20th in the NBA in home-game attendance, with an attendance of 664,022 at the FleetCenter during the regular season.

=== Aftermath ===
Following the season, head coach M.L. Carr resigned, while Fox signed as a free agent with the Los Angeles Lakers, Wesley signed with the Charlotte Hornets, and Williams was traded to the Denver Nuggets. Meanwhile, Day signed with the Miami Heat, and Brickowski, Conlon and Alton Lister were all released to free agency.

This was also the final season for Radja; after failing his physical exam, voiding an off-season trade that would have sent him to the Philadelphia 76ers in exchange for Clarence Weatherspoon and Michael Cage, he returned to play overseas in Europe, signing a contract to play in Greece, and ending his four-year career in the NBA with the Celtics.

== Draft picks ==
Round	Pick	Player	Position	Nationality	College
1	6	Antoine Walker	SF/PF	United States	Kentucky
2	38	Steve Hamer	C	United States	Tennessee

== Roster ==
1996–97 Boston Celtics roster
Players

Pos.	No.	Player	Height	Weight	DOB	From
G	11	Dana Barros	5 ft 11 in (1.80 m)	163 lb (74 kg)	1967–04–13	Boston College
F	34	Frank Brickowski	6 ft 9 in (2.06 m)	240 lb (109 kg)	1959–08–14	Penn State
G	7	Dee Brown	6 ft 1 in (1.85 m)	160 lb (73 kg)	1968–11–29	Jacksonville
C	30	Marty Conlon	6 ft 10 in (2.08 m)	224 lb (102 kg)	1968–01–19	Providence
G	13	Todd Day	6 ft 6 in (1.98 m)	188 lb (85 kg)	1970–01–07	Arkansas
F	29	Pervis Ellison	6 ft 9 in (2.06 m)	210 lb (95 kg)	1967–04–03	Louisville
F	44	Rick Fox	6 ft 7 in (2.01 m)	230 lb (104 kg)	1969–07–24	North Carolina
G	5	Michael Hawkins	6 ft 0 in (1.83 m)	178 lb (81 kg)	1972–10–28	Xavier
C	53	Alton Lister	7 ft 0 in (2.13 m)	240 lb (109 kg)	1958–10–01	Arizona State
G/F	9	Greg Minor	6 ft 6 in (1.98 m)	210 lb (95 kg)	1971–09–18	Louisville
C	40	Dino Radja	6 ft 11 in (2.11 m)	225 lb (102 kg)	1967–04–24	Croatia
C	43	Brett Szabo	6 ft 11 in (2.11 m)	230 lb (104 kg)	1968–02–01	Augustana (SD)
F	8	Antoine Walker	6 ft 8 in (2.03 m)	224 lb (102 kg)	1976–08–12	Kentucky
G	4	David Wesley	6 ft 0 in (1.83 m)	190 lb (86 kg)	1970–11–14	Baylor
F	55	Eric Williams	6 ft 8 in (2.03 m)	220 lb (100 kg)	1972–07–17	Providence

Coaches
Head coach
- M. L. Carr
Assistant(s)
- Dennis Johnson
- K.C. Jones
- John Kuester

Legend
- (DP) Unsigned draft pick
- (FA) Free agent
- (S) Suspended
- Injured

Roster
Updated: March 10, 1997

== Regular season ==
=== Season standings ===
Atlantic Division	W	L	PCT	GB	Home	Road	Div
y-Miami Heat	61	21	.744	–	29–12	32–9	16–8
x-New York Knicks	57	25	.695	4	31–10	26–15	19–6
x-Orlando Magic	45	37	.549	16	26–15	19–22	13–11
x-Washington Bullets	44	38	.537	17	25–16	19–22	14–10
New Jersey Nets	26	56	.317	35	16–25	10–31	11–13
Philadelphia 76ers	22	60	.268	39	11–30	11–30	11–14
Boston Celtics	15	67	.183	46	11–30	4–37	1–23

1996–97 NBA East standings
#	Eastern Conference				
#	Team	W	L	PCT	GB
1	z-Chicago Bulls	69	13	.841	–
2	y-Miami Heat	61	21	.744	8
3	x-New York Knicks	57	25	.695	12
4	x-Atlanta Hawks	56	26	.683	13
5	x-Detroit Pistons	54	28	.659	15
6	x-Charlotte Hornets	54	28	.659	15
7	x-Orlando Magic	45	37	.549	24
8	x-Washington Bullets	44	38	.537	25
9	Cleveland Cavaliers	42	40	.512	27
10	Indiana Pacers	39	43	.476	30
11	Milwaukee Bucks	33	49	.402	36
12	Toronto Raptors	30	52	.366	39
13	New Jersey Nets	26	56	.317	43
14	Philadelphia 76ers	22	60	.268	47
15	Boston Celtics	15	67	.183	54

== Player statistics ==
Legend
GP	Games played	GS	Games started	MPG	Minutes per game
FG%	Field-goal percentage	3P%	3-point field-goal percentage	FT%	Free-throw percentage
RPG	Rebounds per game	APG	Assists per game	SPG	Steals per game
BPG	Blocks per game	PPG	Points per game

=== Regular season ===
Boston Celtics statistics
Player	GP	GS	MPG	FG%	3P%	FT%	RPG	APG	SPG	BPG	PPG
Dana Barros	24	8	29.5	.435	.410	.860	2.0	3.4	1.1	.3	12.5
Frank Brickowski	17	2	15.0	.438	.350	.714	2.0	.9	.3	.2	4.8
Dee Brown	21	2	24.9	.367	.308	.818	2.3	3.2	1.5	.3	7.6
Marty Conlon	74	15	21.8	.471	.200	.842	4.4	1.4	.6	.2	7.8
Todd Day	81	27	28.1	.398	.362	.773	4.1	1.4	1.3	.6	14.5
Nate Driggers	15	0	8.8	.302	.000	.714	1.5	.4	.2	.1	2.4
Pervis Ellison	6	4	20.8	.375		.600	4.3	.7	.8	1.5	2.5
Rick Fox	76	75	34.9	.456	.363	.787	5.2	3.8	2.2	.5	15.4
Steve Hamer	35	3	7.7	.526	.000	.552	1.7	.2	.1	.1	2.2
Michael Hawkins	29	0	11.2	.426	.323	.800	1.1	2.2	.6	.0	2.8
Stacey King^{†}	5	0	6.6	.714		.667	1.8	.2	.0	.2	2.4
Alton Lister	53	2	9.7	.416		.742	3.2	.2	.2	.3	1.6
Greg Minor	23	15	23.8	.480	.125	.861	3.5	1.5	.7	.1	9.6
Dino Rađa	25	25	35.0	.440	.000	.718	8.4	1.9	.9	1.9	14.0
Brett Szabo	70	24	9.5	.446	.000	.738	2.4	.2	.2	.5	2.2
Antoine Walker	82	68	36.2	.425	.327	.631	9.0	3.2	1.3	.6	17.5
David Wesley	74	73	40.4	.468	.360	.781	3.6	7.3	2.2	.2	16.8
Eric Williams	72	67	33.8	.456	.250	.752	4.6	1.8	1.0	.2	15.0

- ^{†} Denotes player spent time with another team in the season. Stats reflect time with the Celtics only.

Player statistics citation:

== Awards and records ==
- Antoine Walker, NBA All-Rookie Team 1st Team

== See also ==
- 1996–97 NBA season
