= Brett Szabo =

American basketball player

Personal information
- Born: February 1, 1968 (age 58) Postville, Iowa, U.S.
- Listed height: 6 ft 11 in (2.11 m)
- Listed weight: 230 lb (104 kg)

Career information
- High school: Postville (Postville, Iowa)
- College: Augustana (South Dakota) (1987–1991)
- NBA draft: 1991: undrafted
- Position: Center
- Number: 43

Career history
- 1996–1997: Boston Celtics

Career highlights
- 2× All-NCC (1989, 1990)
- Stats at NBA.com
- Stats at Basketball Reference

Brett Leon Szabo (born February 1, 1968 in Postville, Iowa) is an American former professional basketball player.

== Career ==
=== High school and college ===
Szabo graduated from Postville High School, where he had played basketball, baseball and golf, in 1986. He was inducted into Postville's Hall of Fame in 2005.

A 6'11" center, Szabo played for the NCAA Division II's Augustana College Vikings in South Dakota, amassing 1,520 points, 802 rebounds and 185 blocks. He was presented with All-North Central Conference honors in 1989 and 1990. Szabo was inducted into the Augustana Vikings' Hall of Fame in 2002.

=== NBA ===
He went undrafted in the 1991 NBA draft and later joined the Charlotte Hornets' training camp, before being waived. He played one season for the National Basketball Association's Boston Celtics (1996–97), playing 70 games while averaging 2.2 points and 2.4 rebounds. In the fall of 1997, he made the training camp of the Philadelphia 76ers, but was waived before season start.

=== CBA ===
Additionally, he played four seasons with as many teams in the Continental Basketball Association (mostly with the Sioux Falls Skyforce). His best CBA season came in 1994–95, when he averaged 5.6 points and 5.5 rebounds in 27 games for the Harrisburg Hammerheads.

=== Overseas ===
Szabo had stints in Kilsyth, Australia (in 1991), Germany (TG Renesas Landshut in 1995–96), Belgium (Castors Braine in 1997–98) and Slovakia (BC Slovakofarma Pezinok from 1998 to 2000). He retired in 2000. Suffering from double vision, Szabo wore corrective glasses during games.

== Career statistics ==
Legend
GP	Games played	GS	Games started	MPG	Minutes per game
FG%	Field goal percentage	3P%	3-point field goal percentage	FT%	Free throw percentage
RPG	Rebounds per game	APG	Assists per game	SPG	Steals per game
BPG	Blocks per game	PPG	Points per game	**Bold**	Career high

=== NBA ===
==== Regular season ====
Year	Team	GP	GS	MPG	FG%	3P%	FT%	RPG	APG	SPG	BPG	PPG
1996–97	Boston	70	24	9.5	.446	.000	.738	2.4	.2	.2	.5	2.2
