= Post Township, Allamakee County, Iowa =

Township in Iowa, US

Post Township, Allamakee County
- Township
- Coordinates: 43°06′57″N 091°32′57″W
- Country: United States
- State: Iowa
- County: Allamakee

Area
  - Total: 35 sq mi (91 km^{2})
  - Land: 35 sq mi (91 km^{2})
  - Water: 0 sq mi (0 km^{2})
- Elevation: 1,142 ft (348 m)

Population (2010)
  - Total: 2,221
  - Density: 63/sq mi (24.4/km^{2})
- Time zone: UTC-6 (CST)
  - Summer (DST): UTC-5 (CDT)
- FIPS code: 19-93468
- GNIS feature ID: 0468564

Post Township is one of eighteen townships in Allamakee County, Iowa, USA. At the 2010 census, its population was 2,221.

== History ==
Post Township was organized in 1851. It is named for Joel Post, a first settler and native of Caughnawaga, New York.

== Geography ==
Post Township covers an area of 35.14 square miles (91.0 km^{2}) and contains one incorporated settlement, Postville. According to Iowa GenWeb records, it contains three cemeteries: Cleveland (also known as Evergreen), Minert (also known as Post Township Cemetery), and Smith (also known as Bachtel or Myron).
