= Postville: A Clash of Cultures in Heartland America =

2000 book by Stephen G. Bloom

- Author: Stephen G. Bloom
- Publisher: Harcourt
- Publication date: 2000
- ISBN: 0156013363

Postville: A Clash of Cultures in Heartland America is a 2000 book by journalist Stephen G. Bloom. The book documents the struggle between the small town of Postville, Iowa, and a group of new arrivals: Lubavitcher Hasidim from Brooklyn who came to the town to run Agriprocessors, the largest kosher meat plant in the United States.

The book was published by Harcourt and was named a Best Book of the year by MSNBC, The Chicago Sun-Times, the Rocky Mountain News, The Chicago Tribune, and the St. Louis Post-Dispatch. It was also made into a documentary.

== Background ==
The author travelled to and from his home in Iowa City and Postville, acquainting himself with the local native Iowan and Hasidic populations. Initially, Bloom sought out the Postville Hasidim in his quest to connect to his Jewish heritage in a largely Christian area, and to understand how the community adapted to life in small-town Iowa while surrounded by an insular, homogeneous and occasionally antisemitic culture. The Hasidim, who are involved in Jewish education and outreach initially accepted Bloom because of his Jewish heritage (though they viewed as a "wayward Jew" due to his secularism). Upon deciding that the Hasidim offered little enlightenment on either issue (as their sole concern was his religious awakening), Bloom's mission quickly changes from a personal quest to a journalistic exploration.

== Summary ==
Bloom describes the arrival of the Hasidim in Postville. In 1987, Aaron Rubashkin, a Lubavitcher Hasidic butcher from Brooklyn, purchased an unused meat-rendering plant and turned it into a state-of-the-art facility for producing glatt kosher meat. A group of a few hundred Hasidim joined him to help manage and operate the facility, which grew to employ 900. The town's population of around 1,300 had a mixed relationship with the Hasidim.

Throughout the book, Bloom describes the power struggles between the two groups, culminating in a ballot referendum held by the town calling for annexation of the land where the plant was located, which permitted the town to gain the ability to tax and regulate the plant. According to the jacket, the book tries to the answer whether "the Iowans [were] prejudiced, or were the Lubavitchers simply unbearable?"

Bloom chooses sides in the culture clash. In the book, Bloom voices his opinions on the vote (he supports annexation) and his condemnation of the Hasidic community (whose behavior towards the local native Iowans he frequently describes as "despicable", and whose beliefs he characterizes as "racist"). At one point in the book, Bloom compares Menachem Mendel Schneerson, the Rebbe (religious leader) of the sect who died in 1994, to Louis Farrakhan, asserting that their messages of separatism are nearly identical.

In the Afterword of the updated edition of the book, Bloom describes the receiving in the aftermath of the book's publication frequent accusations of airing the Jews' "dirty laundry", and betraying his brethren.

== Reception ==
The book became an important reference point in the wider perception of Orthodox Jewry in the United States. The book became especially well-read among liberal Jewish circles in the early 2000s. Many readers of American Jewish backgrounds found the book in tune with their sentiments toward the "ultra-Orthodox", reflective of the uneasy and occasionally antagonistic relationship between the modern and the Haredi Jewish communities today.

The book led many American Jews to rethink their assumptions about kosher meat. A movement toward kosher organic and free range meat was fueled by allegations of slaughterhouse conditions at Agriprocessors reminiscent of those described in Upton Sinclair's book The Jungle. By 2008, leaders within Conservative Judaism had called for an advisory against eating meat products from Agriprocessors, due to continuing allegations of mistreatment of workers. Also in 2008, the Postville Agriprocessors plant was raided by Immigration and Customs Enforcement in what would be the largest such raid in American history. Hundreds of undocumented workers were arrested. In 2004 and again in 2008, the Postville Agriprocessors facility was shown to use slaughter methods that opponents claimed were inhumane and therefore contrary to kosher law.

Bloom did an interview in 2010 where he talks about all the pushback he received from non-Jews and Jews because of the content of his book. During this interview he tells a story that he says illustrates why the Orthodox Jews were being intentionally distant or hostile to the non-Jews of Postville, even to the point of being "racist". Bloom was walking down the street with a prominent member of the Jewish community there named Lazar. As they passed by some non-Jewish workers working on the sidewalk, Bloom told them "Good morning". Bloom asked Lazar why he didn't say good morning, or even acknowledge the workers at all. He replied to Bloom by saying that acknowledging them is "welcoming another Holocaust". Lazar then goes on to say that if they acknowledge non-Jews, then "our children will want to play with each other, then our children will want to go over to their homes, then our children will want to eat their food. Then we will be compromised".
