= Ronn Torossian =

American public relations executive

Ronn D. Torossian
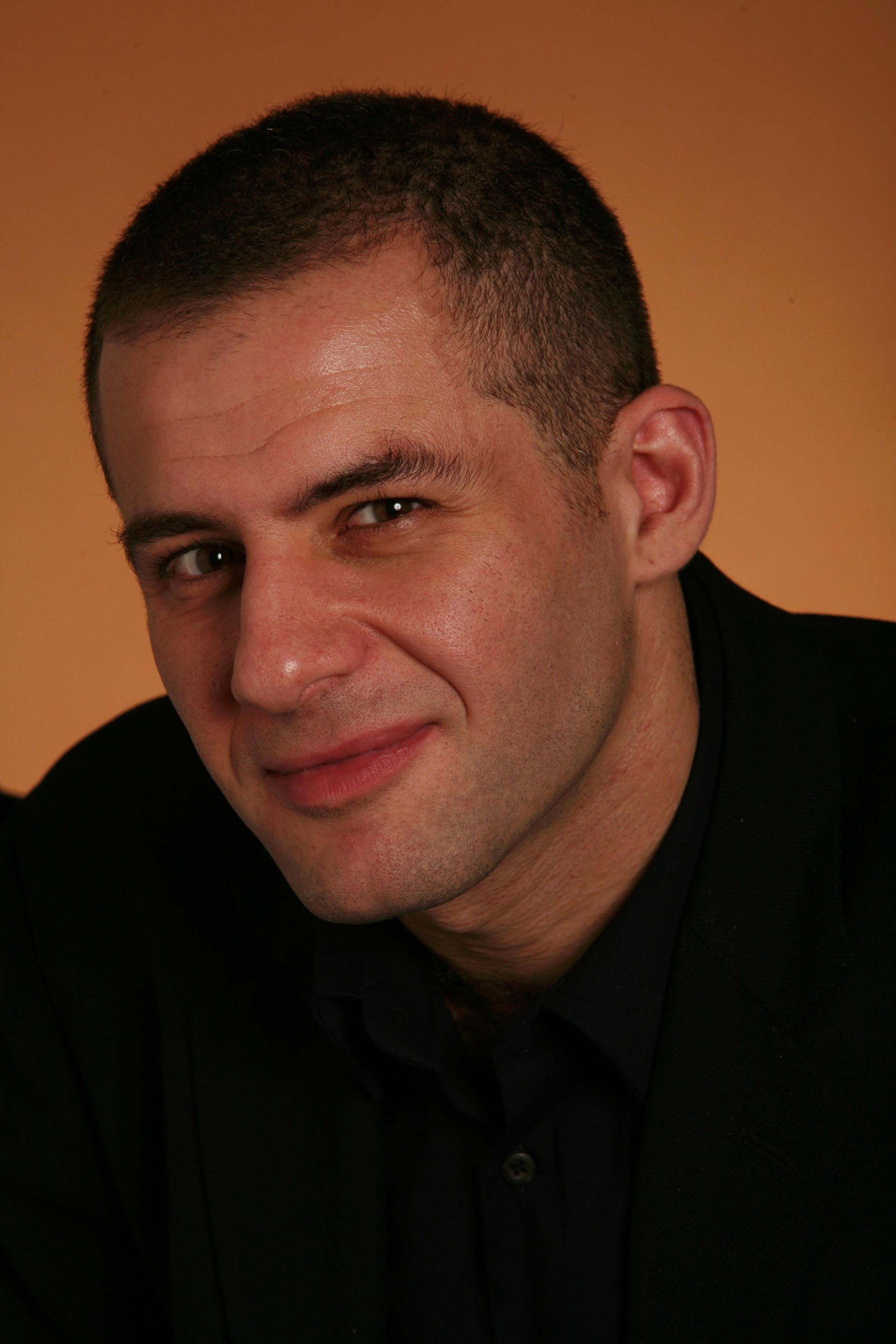
- Torossian in 2011
- Born: August 25, 1974 (age 52); Brooklyn, New York, U.S.
- Education: SUNY Albany
- Occupation: Public relations
- Employer: 5W Public Relations
- Known for: Public relations
- Title: Chief executive officer
- Spouse: Zhanna (m. 2003, divorced)
- Website: Official website

Ronn D. Torossian (born 1974) is an American public relations executive, founder of New York City-based 5W Public Relations (5WPR), and author.

Torossian has been heavily involved in right-wing politics and pro-Israel activism. He has a long-standing association with Betar and helped relaunch and serve in the leadership of the militant pro-Israel group Betar US. Torossian's aggressive and confrontational approach has brought him into conflict with other Jewish organisations, such as the Anti-Defamation League.

== Early life ==
Torossian was born in Brooklyn, New York, grew up in The Bronx and attended Stuyvesant High School in New York City. At age 13, at the insistence of his mother, he joined Betar, the international Zionist youth movement associated with Israel's Likud party. While at SUNY Albany, Torossian became national president of the North American branch of Betar. After completing his undergraduate degree, he moved to Israel, where he sought his master's degree, but quit his studies to get involved in political activism. Torossian founded, together with fellow Betar members (and later Israeli politicians) Danny Danon and Yoel Hasson, an organization called Yerushalyim Shelanu (Our Jerusalem), which promoted Jewish settlement in East Jerusalem.

== Business career ==
Torossian began his career in public relations in 1998, working with then New York City Council speaker Peter Vallone, Sr. during Vallone's trip to Israel. He also worked for the Likud Party in Israel. He worked at two firms, including The MWW Group, before launching his own firm, 5W Public Relations, in 2002. The New York Times called him "brash and aggressively outspoken."

Torossian has also written the book For Immediate Release: Shape Minds, Build Brands, and Deliver Results with Game-Changing Public Relations.

Torossian was on Advertising Age's "40 under 40" list in 2006 and PR Week's "40 under 40" list in 2007.

In addition to his PR company, Torossian is the Chief Marketing Officer, a Partner, and Advisory Board Member of the jet-sharing company JetSmarter. A spokesperson for the New Israel Fund wrote that Torossian had "teamed up" with Pamela Geller and an article in the Jewish Journal of Greater Los Angeles found evidence that he "[worked] in some capacity with Geller." Torossian denied that there was any professional relationship between the two.

=== 5WPR ===
Torossian's public relations agency, 5WPR, was ranked in 2014 by The New York Observer as the number 35 PR company in New York City. In 2017, the public relations reporting organization J. R. O'Dwyer Company ranked 5W Public Relations at number 11 among companies which submitted income and employee information to them, with revenues at $24 million.

In 2008, the company was discovered to have posted fraudulent comments to defend Agriprocessors, a kosher food company that was a client.

=== Reception ===
Torossian's aggressive PR tactics have won him both praise and criticism. Business Week called him "loud, crass, buzz-obsessed," the "Bad Boy of Buzz," and the self-anointed "brash new face of PR." Atlantic Monthly writer Jeffrey Goldberg called him "the most disreputable flack in New York", particularly criticizing his representation of what Goldberg called the "lunatic fringe" of right-wing Israeli politics. Gawker's Hamilton Nolan wrote that Torossian "embodies the public's worst ideas about what a PR person is: loud, brash, more flash than substance, dirty, manipulative, amoral, and, in the end, not particularly bright." The editor of the Jerusalem Post wrote that Torossian and his colleagues were "nuts."

On the other hand, clients have cited his "unlimited energy" and his unique approach to public relations as reasons for hiring him. Jameel Spencer, former CEO of Bad Boy Entertainment-affiliated Blue Flame Marketing and Advertising, called Torossian "one of my most trusted business counsels." A The Jerusalem Post profile of him cited his "meteoric rise in the business world today". Another client compared Torossian to former basketball player Dennis Rodman, whom "Everyone hated to play against. But if he was on your team, you loved him". A Forward story said, "His aggressive style may not always be pretty, but the results speak for themselves."

Some commentators see Torossian's style as a sign of the times. He is "one of the New Yorkiest practitioners of this quintessentially New York profession... the consummate scrappy publicist," wrote The New York Times. Businessweek wrote, "Torossian has anointed himself the brash new face of PR ... echoes the raw, unvarnished discourse of the blogosphere... Few seem better equipped to navigate a celebrity-obsessed culture."

== Political career ==
Torossian was an active member of Betar for 10 years, and its national president from 1994 to 1996, and continued to fund them afterwards. He says he is guided by Ze'ev Jabotinsky's teachings in his financial and personal life. His view of Judaism was shaped by his Betar experience. During his undergraduate days at SUNY Albany, he became an activist and advocate for Jewish people, became the head of Religious Zionists of America/Tagar (the youth wing of Betar), and developed a desire to become the Prime Minister of Israel. He accused the United Jewish Federations of Northeastern New York of financially neglecting SUNY Albany students, but both community and Hillel leaders claimed he was lying. Torossian claimed the personal attacks were because of the community leaders' aversion to his Betar ideology, and that they cared little about the Jewish students.

In 1994, during the Nobel Prize award ceremony in Oslo, Torossian was arrested for protesting together with Avi Weiss against Yasser Arafat being awarded the Peace Prize. And in 1995, as a member of the Coalition for Jewish Concerns-AMCHA, Torossian took part in a protest against Yasser Arafat's visit in front of the John F. Kennedy School of Government where Arafat delivered a speech, and disrupted Arafat's meeting with the National Jewish Community Relations Advisory Council in New York, saying that he and his fellow demonstrators were there to "peacefully raise a voice of Jewish moral conscience against the biggest mass murderer since World War II".

Later that year, Torossian and two other protestors, as members of the Coalition for Jewish Concerns-AMCHA, disrupted the rally where Pat Buchanan launched his presidential bid, holding a sign that said, "Buchanan Is a Racist". Torossian, a follower of Rabbi Avi Weiss, criticized Howard University president Patrick Swygert for his failure to "clamp down" antisemitism on campus, and claimed that Swygert had "allowed Jewish students to be intimidated by black students and ... taken no action". Torossian claimed he and other Jewish students had been "verbally abused and physically threatened" by black students while staging a counterdemonstration against a black student rally in support of the Million Man March, called by Louis Farrakhan. He called Farrakhan "a racist, sexist, anti-Semitic, homophobic hater". Torossian sued the police because they had prevented him from demonstrating at the rally, claiming his First and Fourth Amendment rights had been violated. During a demonstration in front of the Israeli consulate in New York, Torossian condemned and criticized Adam Shapiro, co-founder of the International Solidarity Movement, and called him a traitor.

Torossian organized a protest in 1997 against Arafat's visit to the United Nations, and affirmed the coalition's support of Har Homa. He participated in a demonstration against Sheik Omar Abdel-Rahman in front of a New York courthouse when Abdel-Rahman was being tried for the New York City landmark bomb plot. Later that year, he helped three families, consisting of 15 people, move into a house in Arab East Jerusalem. His organization hired private bulldozers to help quicken the pace of construction in Har Homa. He and his organization began making news for protesting whenever they perceived injustice against Jewish people.

As a Likud activist, Torossian, along with Rabbi Avi Weiss and New York State Assemblyman Dov Hikind submitted a petition in 1998 to Israel's High Court of Justice demanding the arrest and prosecution of Abu Abbas for his role in the Achille Lauro hijacking by PLO in 1985, and the murder of Leon Klinghoffer. The state refused to try Abbas because the Knesset had passed a law that prohibited prosecution of crimes committed before the Oslo Accord of 1993. The court ruled in favor of the state.

As part of the right-wing civil rights organization Tzedek-Tzedek, Torossian helped that same year with coordinating lawsuits against Avishai Raviv to "pursue the legality of the Oslo Accords, to see whether it is legal for Palestinian murderers to be running around, not under trial and not under indictment." He submitted a petition to the High Court demanding that Raviv be tried for perjury for his statements during the trial of Yigal Amir, who assassinated Yitzhak Rabin.

In 1999, Torossian criticized Benjamin Netanyahu's decisions, which included stopping construction at Har Homa and withdrawal of Israeli troops from parts of Hebron. As director of Americans for Israel's Survival, Torossian helped to organize a rally outside the French tourist office in New York in 2002, protesting against the French government's apathy towards antisemitic attacks. The rally called for a boycott of French goods and travel to France, aimed at harming France's economy.

Torossian publishes opinion pieces in the New York Post, The New York Observer and The Jewish Press. In March 2015 he criticized the New Israel Fund in conjunction with a campaign by Pamela Geller over the NIF's stance on the Boycott, Divestment and Sanctions campaign.

Torossian is a supporter of Donald Trump.

Torossian has supported Democratic Congressman Ritchie Torres. In late 2023, Torossian helped Torres create Chutz PAC, a political action committee. After the October 7 attacks in 2023, Torossian started a WhatsApp group called "Jews for Ritchie Torres", which Torossian and Michael Sinensky moderated. Torossian and Sinensky claim to have raised over $150,000 for Torres. The Nation reported that in 2023 and 2024, Torossian introduced Torres to senior Israeli government officials and wealthy American donors. After Zeteo reported on Torossian and Sinensky's support for Torres, Torres returned their donations.

In 2024, Torossian relaunched Betar US, which the Jewish Telegraphic Agency described as a "militant pro-Israel group".

In 2025, Torossian was involved in an altercation at the Conference of Presidents of Major American Jewish Organizations where he shouted and interrupted a speaker, and was removed by security. Around this time the ADL added Betar US to its list of extremist groups, to which Torossian responded by calling the ADL "a radical woke organization." Also that year, he was banned from the World Zionist Congress over disparaging comments made towards Shai Davidai. The ban was lifted a few months later.

In 2026, Betar US reached an agreement with the state of New York's Attorney General Letitia James to stop operating in the region after an investigation found that Betar US had "encouraged its followers to bring weapons to pro-Palestinian protests, trespassed onto private property to steal Palestinian flags and followed and struck people wearing keffiyehs" and had engaged in a "campaign of violence, harassment, and intimidation against Arab, Muslim, and Jewish New Yorkers.” In response, Torossian stated that "NY stands with Palestine. We advise all Zionist organizations to disband in the state of NY."

== Personal life ==
Torossian's grandparents came from Armenia, though Torossian himself has stated that he strongly identifies as Jewish and that "I do not and never have considered myself to be Armenian". He was formerly married to a woman named Zhanna, with which he had at least one child. He formerly lived in Manhattan, but as of 2026 now lives in Israel.
