= Sholom Rubashkin =

Former executive officer of Agriprocessors

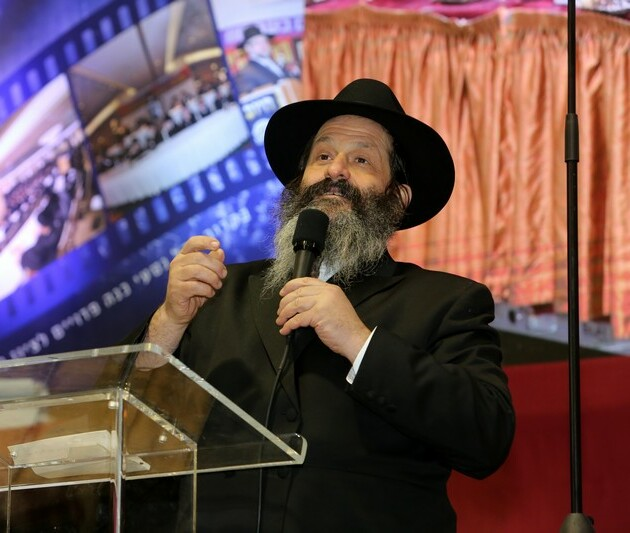
- Born: Sholom Mordechai Rubashkin; October 30, 1959 (age 67); Brooklyn, New York
- Occupation: Kosher meat plant manager
- Employer: Agriprocessors
- Criminal charge: Bank fraud
- Criminal penalty: 27 years imprisonment, $27 million in restitution. June 2010.
- Criminal status: Sentence commuted December 20, 2017
- Spouse: Leah Rubashkin (m. 1981)
- Children: 10
- Parent(s): Aaron Rubashkin (father); Rivka Rubashkin (mother)

Sholom Mordechai Rubashkin (Yiddish: שלום מרדכי רובאשקין, romanized: Sholem Mordkhe Rubashkin; born October 30, 1959) is an American businessman convicted for fraud who was the CEO of Agriprocessors, a now-bankrupt kosher slaughterhouse and meat packing plant in Postville, Iowa, formerly owned by his father, Aaron Rubashkin. During his time as CEO of the plant, Agriprocessors grew into one of the nation's largest kosher meat producers, but was also cited for issues involving animal cruelty, food safety, environmental safety, child labor, and hiring undocumented immigrants.

In November 2009, Rubashkin was convicted of 86 counts of financial fraud, including bank fraud, mail and wire fraud and money laundering. In June 2010, he was sentenced to 27 years in prison. In a separate trial, he was acquitted of knowingly hiring underage workers. He served his sentence in Federal Correctional Institution, Otisville in Mount Hope, New York. In January 2011, his lawyers filed an appeal; on September 16, 2011, the appeals court ruled against Rubashkin. The U.S. Supreme Court refused to hear an appeal of that ruling on October 1, 2012. On December 20, 2017, asserting a large bipartisan push for the measure, President Donald Trump commuted Rubashkin's prison sentence after eight years served.

== Early life and marriage ==
Sholom Rubashkin was the second-youngest son of Rivka and Aaron Rubashkin, a kosher butcher from Brooklyn, New York, born in Nevel, Russia. The Rubashkins are ultra-Orthodox Jews belonging to the Chabad-Lubavitch Hasidic movement.

In 1981, Rubashkin married Leah Goldman and spent a year learning in kollel. He then worked in his father's butcher shop, until he and his wife were sent to Atlanta, Georgia, as emissaries (shluchim) in the Chabad-Lubavitch outreach program. A year later the couple moved to Minnesota, and Rubashkin commuted to his father's new meat-packing plant in Postville, Iowa for approximately three years before he and his family relocated there. The couple has ten children.

== CEO of Agriprocessors ==
In 1987, Aaron Rubashkin opened the Agriprocessors plant in Postville, Iowa, and put two of his sons in charge: Sholom, the second-youngest, as CEO; and Heshy, the youngest, as vice president of marketing and sales. Eventually, Agriprocessors became the nation's largest kosher slaughterhouse and meat packing plant and the only one authorized by Israel's Orthodox rabbinate to export beef to Israel. According to statistics Rubashkin gave to Cattle Buyers Weekly, Agriprocessors' sales increased from $80 million in 1997 to $180 million in 2002. In 2002, Agriprocessors was ranked as one of the 30 biggest beef-packing plants in America.

Under Rubashkin's leadership, Agriprocessors was cited for issues involving animal treatment, food safety, environmental safety, child labor, and hiring other undocumented workers.

In 2004 and again in 2008, PETA lodged complaints about Agriprocessors’ alleged cruel treatment of animals and gruesome violations of Kosher law.

Rubashkin was replaced as CEO in September 2008. Agriprocessors' plants stopped operating in October 2008. On November 5, 2008, the firm filed for bankruptcy.

== Raid and arrests ==
On May 12, 2008, the FBI and Department of Homeland Security agents raided the plant and arrested 389 workers who were suspected of being undocumented immigrants. At that time, it was the largest single-site raid into a workplace in the United States.

On October 30, 2008, one day after the Iowa labor commissioner fined Agriprocessors $10 million for wage violations, Rubashkin was arrested on federal conspiracy charges of harboring undocumented immigrants and aiding and abetting aggravated identity theft. Federal officials claimed that he intentionally helped undocumented workers obtain false documentation. After an initial court appearance, he was released the same day on $1 million appearance bond after agreeing to wear an ankle monitor to track his movement, to limit his travel to northern Iowa, and to surrender his and his wife's passports.

On November 13, 2008, Rubashkin was arrested again at his Postville home on federal bank fraud charges alleging that he diverted millions of dollars in loan collateral to artificially inflate Agriprocessors' accounts receivable.

Rubashkin was denied release on bail on November 20, 2008, after Magistrate Judge Jon Scoles determined that he posed a flight risk. Scoles took into consideration Israel's "Law of Return," which grants automatic citizenship to every Jew and members of his family upon immigration, as well as a search of Rubashkin's house in which federal agents found a bag with $20,000 in cash, several silver coins and passports. The successful use of an argument based on Israel's Law of Return has caused concern among Jewish communities who fear that such claims could be used to deny bail to Jews in general.

District Court Judge Linda Reade reversed Scoles's ruling on January 27, 2009. Rubashkin was released on $500,000 bond and ordered to surrender his birth certificate and his and his family's passports and agree to wear an electronic monitoring bracelet. He was not allowed to leave Allamakee County or on any of Agriprocessors' property and was barred from having contact with potential witnesses.

== Trials ==
=== Federal trials ===
Rubashkin was convicted in November 2009 on 86 charges of financial fraud, including bank fraud, mail and wire fraud and money laundering. Prosecutors claimed the company intentionally defrauded St. Louis based First Bank on a revolving $35 million loan by faking invoices from meat dealers, inflating the value of the company.

On November 23, 2009, Rubashkin's second trial on 72 immigration charges was canceled following the government's request to dismiss without prejudice. In its motion to dismiss, the U.S. Attorney's Office said any conviction on the immigration charges would have no impact upon his sentence, writing, "dismissal will avoid an extended and expensive trial, conserve limited resources, and lessen the inconvenience to witnesses." Reade dismissed the immigration charges without prejudice.

On March 3, 2010, Reade denied Rubashkin's motion for dismissal of the financial corruption charges and request for a new trial.

Rubashkin's sentencing hearing took place on April 28–29 in Cedar Rapids, Iowa. Prosecutors asked Reade to impose a life sentence. After that request came under fire from former Justice Department officials, including six former Attorneys General, one former solicitor general and more than a dozen former U.S. attorneys, Assistant U.S. Attorney Pete Deegan said in court that the government would seek 25 years, while the defense asked for no more than six years.

On June 22, 2010, Reade handed down a sentence of 27 years, two years more than prosecutors had requested. According to a 52-page memorandum she released the day before sentencing, Reade imposed a 324-month prison term followed by 5 years of supervised release, and ordered Rubashkin to pay $18.5 million to First Bank Business Capital, the plant's largest lender; $8.3 million to MB Financial Bank, another lender; and $3,800 to Waverly Sales, Inc., which received late payments from the plant for cattle.

His lawyers requested that he be sent to Federal Correctional Institution, Otisville due to the services the prison provides to religious Jewish inmates; Reade placed the request and the BOP granted it. His lawyers stated that he wished to be eventually sent to a lower-security prison.

=== State child labor trial ===
Separate from the federal trials, Rubashkin went on trial on the child labor charges in state court in Waterloo, Iowa, starting May 4, 2010. Before the trial, charges against Agriprocessors corporate officer Aaron Rubashkin and plant human resources employee Laura Althouse were dismissed. Additionally, the number of charges in the indictment was amended to 83 from 9,311. Sholom Rubashkin was acquitted of all charges on June 7, 2010, but Agriprocessors, which had been purchased by Heshy Friedman, entered a guilty plea to the 83 child labor charges, and the plant's human resources manager pleaded to state child labor charges under an agreement with the state.

In February 2016 the child labor case against Rubashkin was expunged.

=== Unsuccessful motion for new trial ===
On August 5, 2010, Rubashkin's lawyers filed a motion for new trial after having discovered that Reade was more involved in planning the 2008 immigration raid at Agriprocessors′ Postville plant than previously disclosed, claiming that "federal law and U.S. Supreme Court rulings would have required Reade to remove herself from the trial." On October 27, 2010, Reade denied the motion.

On January 3, 2011, Rubashkin's lawyers filed an appeal for a new trial with the 8th Circuit Court of Appeals in St. Louis. In the brief, four arguments for a new trial were made. According to the brief, government documents that surfaced after Rubashkin's conviction and were not made available to the defense showed that Reade was involved in planning the federal immigration raid of the Postville plant in May 2008, which it sees as collusion with the prosecution. Reade's "excessive coziness" with prosecutors planning the raid raised doubts about her impartiality in the case, the brief claims, and states that as a result Reade should have recused herself, and that Rubashkin is entitled to a new trial or, at a minimum, an evidentiary hearing.

Following the filing of this appeal, the American Civil Liberties Union (ACLU), National Association of Criminal Defense Lawyers (NACDL) and Washington Legal Foundation (WLF) filed amicus briefs supporting Rubashkin's appeal for a new trial. What has united the three groups is the involvement of the judge in the case with the prosecution, as argued by Rubashkin's defense team, which, according to ACLU's Iowa legal director Randall Wilson, "immediately gave the appearance of unfairness." The ACLU brief says: "Mr. Rubashkin's conviction should be vacated and he should get his 'day in court,' with a tribunal that is not an arm of the prosecution. Due Process demands it. The Separation of Powers Doctrine demands it." The ACLU still sees Rubashkin as someone who exploited undocumented workers and underage labor, according to Wilson, but sees these as separate issues from the matter of legal principle argued in its brief. After the filing of the appeal, the government, in a rare move, denied consent to the filing of the three amicus briefs, and filed a Resistance with the Eighth Circuit, attempting to block the court from accepting the brief. Following a law review published in Bloomberg Law Reports, the government filed a brief to withdraw its opposition to the amicus briefs.

On March 11, 2011, the government filed its response to Rubashkin's appeal and on April 18, 2011, Rubashkin's lawyers filed their reply brief. The oral argument before the 8th Circuit Court of Appeals took place on June 15, 2011, in St. Louis. On September 16, 2011, the court ruled against Rubashkin. Rubashkin's attorney said they would appeal to the U.S. Supreme Court.

=== Unsuccessful U.S. Supreme Court petition ===
Represented by former US Solicitor General Paul Clement and Nathan Lewin, Rubashkin petitioned the Supreme Court for a writ of certiorari in April 2012, arguing that Reade's pre-raid meetings with prosecutors raised questions of bias and that his sentence was excessive for a first-time nonviolent offender. While supported by amicus briefs from several legal organizations and former Justice Department Officials, the Supreme Court denied the petition in October 2012.

== Responses ==
On May 3, 2011, at a once-a-year House Oversight Hearing of the Judiciary Committee at which Attorney General Eric Holder testified, two members of Congress (Debbie Wasserman Schultz and Sheila Jackson Lee) publicly mentioned Rubashkin's case to Holder.

Forty-five members of Congress wrote to Holder to ask questions about the handling of the case.

A petition on the White House's "We the People" website, asking then President Barack Obama to investigate Rubashkin's case, was submitted on October 22, 2011, with 52,226 online signatures. The White House's response was that it could not comment due to the separation of powers. As to the allegations of prosecutorial unethical conduct, the White House asserted that the Department of Justice "has mechanisms in place to investigate allegations of prosecutorial misconduct."

In an op-ed titled "Prosecutors, judges decry Rubashkin 'witch hunt'" in the Des Moines Register, Charles B. Renfrew and James H. Reynolds wrote, "The explanation as to 'why' the pursuit of Sholom Rubashkin was so overzealous that it bordered on a veritable witch hunt still remains elusive, but the clarification as to 'how' is now punctiliously laid out in both the merits brief and the letter to Mr. Techau: There was false testimony and willful manipulation, and that makes this a shocking case of prosecutorial misconduct."

== Commutation ==
On December 20, 2017, President Donald Trump commuted Rubashkin's sentence. The White House wrote that the commutation was "encouraged by bipartisan leaders from across the political spectrum, from Orrin Hatch to Nancy Pelosi", and was "based on expressions of support from Members of Congress and a broad cross-section of the legal community", although the action "is not a Presidential pardon. It does not vacate Mr. Rubashkin's conviction, and it leaves in place a term of supervised release and a substantial restitution obligation, which were also part of Mr. Rubashkin's sentence." Rubashkin was thus released 19 years earlier than planned.

Harvard Law School professor emeritus Alan Dershowitz had raised Rubashkin's case over lunch with Trump. Jared Kushner, Trump's son-in-law, had also persistently advocated for the clemency, as had the Chabad-Lubavitch-affliated Aleph Institute, which applauded the act. Opponents of undocumented immigration were upset by the commutation, and reportedly Trump did not answer a reporter's question that was shouted at him about whether he knew Rubashkin had hired undocumented immigrants.

== See also ==
- List of people granted executive clemency in the first Trump presidency
- List of people pardoned or granted clemency by the president of the United States
- Moshe Rubashkin
