= Rubashkin, Volgograd Oblast =

Rubashkin Рубашкин
- Khutor
- Location within Volgograd Oblast Location within Russia
- Coordinates: 49°24′N 42°03′E
- Country: Russia
- Region: Volgograd Oblast
- District: Serafimovichsky District
- Time zone: UTC+4:00

Rubashkin (Russian: Рубашкин) is a rural locality (a khutor) in Gorbatovskoye Rural Settlement, Serafimovichsky District, Volgograd Oblast, Russia. The population was 140 as of 2010. There are 3 streets.

== Geography ==
Rubashkin is located near the Krivaya River, 63 km southwest of Serafimovich (the district's administrative centre) by road. Gorbatovsky is the nearest rural locality.
