= Shmarya Rosenberg =

American blogger

- Born: 1958 (age 67–68)

Shmarya Rosenberg (born Scott Rosenberg in 1958) is a former blogger who published the blog FailedMessiah.com.

== Biography ==
Rosenberg grew up in a Conservative Jewish non-observant family in Saint Paul, Minnesota, where his parents operated a beauty supply company. According to his family's history, his great-great-grandfather was a former chasid of Rabbi Menachem Mendel Schneersohn, the third Chabad rebbe.

Rosenberg was active in Jewish student politics at the University of Minnesota and served several years as an executive of the North American World Union of Jewish Students. He became a baal teshuva and joined the Chabad movement as an ultra-orthodox Hasidic Jew dedicated to study, community and rigorous observance, abandoning his former ambitions, one of which was to become a songwriter. He was an observant Hasidic Jew for the next 20 years.

Rosenberg became disenchanted with the Chabad movement in 2004 after discovering an unsigned and unsent letter addressed to him by Rabbi Menachem Mendel Schneerson responding to his request for Chabad aid in the effort to rescue the Jews of Ethiopia. This resulted in the creation of his blog, FailedMessiah.com.

=== FailedMessiah blog ===
Rosenberg's writing career began with his personal blog, FailedMessiah, referring to the belief among Lubavitcher Hassidim that their dead rebbe, Menachem Mendel Schneerson, is the messiah. FailedMessiah served as a news outlet with the motto Covering Orthodox Judaism since 2004. Rosenberg reports as a journalistic watchdog and whistleblower in "a combination of muckraking reporting and personal grudge into a must-read digest of the actual and alleged misdeeds of the ultra-Orthodox world. He has broken news about sexual misconduct, smear campaigns and dubious business practices conducted by or on behalf of stringently religious Jews." Chabad-Lubavitch leaders claim that he has exaggerated the degree of messianism in the movement and that he is driven to settle scores.

Rosenberg sold Failed Messiah in February 2016 to a group known as Diversified Holdings.
