= VINnews =

Orthodox Jewish news website

- Former name: Vos Iz Neias
- Company type: Private
- Website type: News, News aggregation & blogging
- Available in: English
- Website: vinnews.com
- Advertising: Yes
- Registration: Optional
- Launched: 2006
- Current status: Active

VINnews, formerly Vos Iz Neias? ("What's the news?" in Yiddish), founded in 2007, is an online news site that caters to the Orthodox and Haredi Jewish communities, primarily in the New York metropolitan area. VINnews competes with Yeshiva World News as the major news website for the Haredi Jewish world.

VINnews is owned by four anonymous Orthodox Jewish investors. There are advertisers and writers, but since all business is conducted through the Internet and through PayPal, the anonymity of the investors are maintained.

VINnews endorsed Donald Trump in the 2020 U.S. presidential election, describing Joe Biden as senile and a socialist, while approving of Trump's support of school vouchers and his position on Israel.
