= Moshe Rubashkin =

American businessman (born 1958)

Moshe Rubashkin (born 1958) is an American businessman and convicted fraudster.

An ultra-Orthodox Jew of the Lubavitcher hasidic movement, he is a former chairman of the Crown Heights Jewish Community Council (CHJCC), a private, nonprofit social service organization in Crown Heights, Brooklyn, New York, that receives $2 million per annum in state funding for community improvement projects. He was elected to a three-year term in January 2005, while on probation after having served 15 months in federal prison on bank fraud charges. In 2008, he was sentenced to 16 months in prison for illegal storage of hazardous waste at a textile mill he formerly owned, and remained in office as head of CHJCC while serving time in federal prison.

== Biography ==
Moshe Rubashkin is the second-oldest son of Rivka and Aaron Rubashkin, a Lubavitcher hasidic butcher from Brooklyn, New York, born in Nevel, Russia.

== Indictments and convictions ==
=== Assault and riot ===
In 1983, Rubashkin was arrested and indicted on felony assault and riot charges. He later pleaded guilty to misdemeanor charges and was sentenced to three years probation and 300 hours of community service.

=== Cherry Hill Textiles ===
In 1995, Rubashkin and his father, Aaron Rubashkin, as owners of Cherry Hill Textiles Mill in Brooklyn, New York, were found guilty by the National Labor Relations Board of failing to pay union dues deducted from workers' wages, for six months in 1993 through the date of the judgement. They were ordered to make restitution with interest.

=== Montex Textiles ===
Rubashkin owned and operated Montex Textiles, a textile dyeing, bleaching and weaving business in Allentown, Pennsylvania, bought by the Rubashkin family in 1989 until it was closed in 2001.

==== Bank fraud ====
A government investigation found that between March 25, 1999, and March 30, 1999, Rubashkin attempted to deposit three checks totalling $325,000 payable to Montex drawn from an account of an entity named First Choice Associates in Brooklyn, that he knew did not have the funds to cover the checks. He pleaded guilty to one count of bank fraud under US CODE 18 § 1344, "execution of a scheme to defraud a financial institution" on July 31, 2002.

He was sentenced to 15 months in prison, five years probation, and fined $233,000. He appealed the length of the sentence without success. He served his time at Fort Dix Federal Prison in New Jersey.

Prior to this, Rubashkin was involved in a separate punishable offense. In his capacity as president of Montex, he had failed to secure workers' compensation insurance for the company's employees, required by Pennsylvania law. On May 4, 2001, he was placed in an Accelerated Rehabilitation Disposition (ARD) program for a period of 18 months and ordered to pay $968 in fines, costs, and restitution.

==== Illegal storage of hazardous waste ====
The textile mill closed in 2001, but numerous containers of hazardous waste were stored without the necessary environmental permits on the premises. In 2002, the mill was sold to a New York corporation called Skyline Industries, Inc. According to the prosecution, the Rubashkin family had maintained an interest in the plant following its sale to Skyline Industries and during subsequent complex financial transactions, including a $4 million mortgage foreclosure awarded to a company called Supreme Realty of Brooklyn. In 2005, an order by the city was issued for the property to be sold at a sheriff's auction because of unpaid school and county property taxes. Shortly before the planned sale, a fire broke out at the plant; that was followed by three more fires — one of which was attributed to arson. The Environmental Protection Agency (EPA) obtained a court order to enter the site. They found major fire hazards, including explosive aluminium powder and acids. The EPA initiated a clean-up of the property in October 2005, including disposal of numerous containers of hazardous wastes and substances. In November 2007, Rubashkin and his son, Sholom Rubashkin, formerly in charge of running the family's real estate branch under the alias Sam Sternburg, were arrested and indicted on charges of illegal storage of hazardous waste without a permit and one count of making a materially false statement.

Moshe Rubashkin pleaded guilty in February 2008. In November 2008, he was sentenced to 16 months in prison and ordered to pay $450,000 (~$641,805 in 2024) in fines. The monies will be distributed between the EPA and the city of Allentown. He served his time at Otisville Federal Prison, from where he was released on April 12, 2010.

His son, Sholom, pleaded guilty to making a materially false statement to the EPA. In March 2009, he was sentenced to four months in prison and three years supervised release.

== As head of the Crown Heights Jewish Community Council ==
In 2005, Rubashkin was elected with 70% of the votes as chairman of the Crown Heights Jewish Community Council (CHJCC), described as "a publicly-funded social service organization whose leadership doubles as the neighborhood's rabbinical council". His time in office was controversial. When elected, he was expected to help bridge divisiveness in the Lubavitcher community, and he was supposed not to be directly involved in the CHJCC's finances due to his conviction on felony charges, but he was soon accused by fellow members of the Council of having misdirected funds for personal gain. Rubashkin was also reported to have physically attacked people who did not agree with him.

At the end of his three-year term in January 2008, he successfully prevented elections taking place until May of the following year. When he was convicted a second time on felony charges, "no one seemed to mind ... And the strange thing is, even though he went to jail in November (2008), he remained president of the council until elections were held in May (2009). In May, (his) ticket lost the election. And then, something strange happened: ... Moshe′s family and supporters waged a court battle to retain control of the council."

== See also ==
- Sholom Rubashkin
