= Aaron Rubashkin =

American businessman (died 2020)

- Born: Abraham Aaron Rubashkin; 1927 or 1928; Nevel, Leningrad Oblast, Russian SFSR, USSR
- Died: April 2, 2020 (aged 92); New York City, U.S.
- Occupations: Businessman, kosher meat butcher
- Spouse: Rivka Chazanov
- Children: 9, including Sholom and Moshe

Abraham Aaron Rubashkin (Yiddish: אברהם אהרן רובאַשקין Russian: Рубашкин; 1927 or 1928 – April 2, 2020) was an American businessman and butcher.

== Early life ==
An adherent of the Lubavitcher Hasidic movement, Rubashkin was born in the late-1920s in the town of Nevel, Russian SFSR of the former Soviet Union. He was the son of Getzel Rubashkin and Rosa, Lubavicher Hasidim who raised their two sons and daughters as observant Jews in spite of the anti-religious repression in the Soviet Union. When the Germans occupied Nevel in July 1941, the Rubashkin family fled east, eventually reaching the Uzbek city of Samarkand, where he married Rivka Chazanov of the Chein family of Nevel. After the war, the Rubashkin family left the Soviet Union via Lemberg (Lviv, Ukraine) and spent time in Austria, before they settled in Paris in 1947. In Paris, his father ran a grocery shop and his mother served as a cook at a Jewish girls school, and he became a butcher. In 1953, the family moved to New York City, where he and his partner opened Lieberman & Rubashkin Glatt Kosher Butchers on 14th Avenue in the Borough Park section of Brooklyn.

== Career ==
He was the head, usually referred to as "patriarch", of the Rubashkin family, dubbed a "kosher meat dynasty" by The New York Times. The Rubashkin family is a tight-knit family, well known among orthodox Jews in Brooklyn for its wealth and generosity towards Jewish causes. Rubashkin was the owner and president of most of the family's businesses, many of which have faced legal problems. Most notable of those problems were those of Agriprocessors, once the largest kosher slaughterhouse and meat-packaging factory in the United States. Through the company, Rubashkin was responsible for establishing a small Orthodox Jewish community in Postville, Iowa. Agriprocessors went into bankruptcy after the U.S. Immigration and Customs Enforcement (ICE) staged a raid of the plant known as the "Postville Raid" for employing illegal immigrant laborers.

=== Family businesses ===
Although best known for his role in the kosher meat business, Rubashkin also invested in the textile industry and in real estate. Three generations, including in-laws, have been involved in the tight-knit family's business ventures.

==== Rubashkin's ====
Rubashkin's, a butcher shop on 14th Avenue in the Borough Park section of Brooklyn, which Rubashkin opened in 1953 with his partner Alter Lieberman, was run by him until his death. His office on the second floor was said to be the center from where he was overseeing his various businesses. Rubashkin's was also one of the names under which the kosher meat produced by Agriprocessors' was marketed.

==== Crown Deli ====
Crown Deli, on 13th Avenue in Brooklyn, a restaurant run by Rubashkin's wife, Rivka, since the 1960s, was described by some as more of a soup kitchen than a business. It was closed several times for sanitary violations by the New York City Department of Health and Mental Hygiene (DOHMH), the last time on March 3, 2010.

==== Cherry Hill Textiles ====
Cherry Hill Textiles, Inc. was a corporation with its principal place of business in Brooklyn, New York. It engaged in the dyeing and finishing of textiles owned by Aaron Rubashkin and his second oldest son Moshe Rubashkin. In 1995 he and his son Moshe were found guilty of collecting union dues from their employees without sending the collected monies on to the "United Production Workers Union". They were ordered by the National Labor Relations Board. to repay the money with interest.

==== Agriprocessors ====
Founded in 1987, the slaughterhouse and meat-packaging factory Agriprocessors, based in Postville, Iowa, was owned by Rubashkin and managed by two of his sons and a son-in-law. The distribution centers in Brooklyn and Miami, Florida were run by one of his daughters and another of his sons.

Agriprocessors faced several accusations of mistreatment of cattle between 2004 and 2008. The company was fined $600,000 for violating waste-water regulations in 2006, and $9.99 million in October 2008 for various violations of state labor law, including illegally deducting money from employees for safety equipment and failing to pay employees. When the U.S. Immigration and Customs Enforcement (ICE) staged a raid at the Postville plant in May 2008, during which nearly 400 illegal immigrant workers were arrested, Rubashkin said that he "had no idea that his workers were illegal". In September 2008, he, his son Sholom Rubashkin, as well as the company's human resources manager and two office employees, were charged for state child labor violations. He was never charged federally, and the state child labor charges against him were dropped in May 2010. His son was acquitted in state court of knowingly hiring underage workers at the plant in June 2010. However, Agriprocessors, as a corporation, entered a guilty plea to 83 child labor charges, with the footnote that the conviction wasn't based on the knowledge or intent of Sholom Rubashkin or his father, Abraham 'Aaron' Rubashkin. The plant's human resources manager pleaded to state child labor charges under an agreement with the state.

On November 5, 2008, Agriprocessors filed for Chapter 11 bankruptcy, and was bought at auction in July 2009.

== Personal life ==
Rubashkin's death from COVID-19 was announced on April 2, 2020.

=== Family ===
The couple had nine children, five daughters and four sons:

- Gutol Goldman
- Sara Balkany
- Rochel Leah Rosenfeld
- Yossi Rubashkin
- Moshe Rubashkin
- Sholom Mordechai Rubashkin
- Chayala Gourarie
- Heshy Zvi Rubashkin
- Chana Zelda Minkowicz
