= Stephen G. Bloom =

American journalist and academic

Stephen G. Bloom (born August 19, 1951) is an American journalist and professor emeritus of journalism at the University of Iowa, in Iowa City.

== Background ==
Born in New Jersey, Bloom attended the University of California, Berkeley, and received a B.A. in 1973.

== Professional career ==
Bloom began his career living in Rio de Janeiro as a writer and editor at the Brazil Herald. He has written for the Los Angeles Times, the San Jose Mercury News, the Sacramento Bee and the Dallas Morning News. He also served as the national news editor at the Latin America Daily Post. He was press secretary and speechwriter for San Francisco Mayor Frank Jordan during 1992. In 1993, he joined the journalism faculty of the University of Iowa, where he serves as professor emeritus and Bessie Dutton Murray Professional Scholar. Bloom has been a visiting scholar at Columbia University's Center for the Study of Society and Medicine and, during the 2011–2012 academic year, he served as the Howard R. Marsh Visiting professor of journalism in the Department of Communication Studies at the University of Michigan.

== Writings ==
Bloom has also written a number of short stories, and co-written a play called Shoedog. He wrote the book Postville: A Clash of Cultures in Heartland America, a look at a Chabad hasidic community that moved into a small Midwestern town. His book was heavily criticized in Jewish religious circles as having an anti-religious bias.

He has published The Oxford Project with photographer Peter Feldstein. The book consists of a series portraits of residents of Oxford, Iowa, taken 21 years apart with first-person text from the subjects.

Tears of Mermaids, his book about the history of pearls and the people who collect, trade, sell, and obsess over them, was published by St. Martin's Press in 2009.Works.

=== Observations From 20 Years of Iowa Life ===
In December 2011, Bloom wrote an essay entitled "Observations From 20 Years of Iowa Life" for The Atlantic, characterizing Iowans in terms of his assessment of economic and social challenges facing the state, and questioning whether Iowa's status as the first-in-the-nation caucus is justified. In an e-mail to a fellow faculty member, Bloom said that he submitted the column to more than 40 publications before The Atlantic Online accepted it; among those that rejected it were Politico. He also hoped to appear on Comedy Central's The Colbert Report and John King's show on CNN, appearances that never materialized. In an e-mail of Dec. 11, Bloom said that he was scheduled to appear on Colbert on January 3, the night of the Iowa Caucuses, but the appearance did not materialize.

The article provoked outrage from many Iowans, who took offense at Bloom's negative tone, broad stereotypes, and factual errors. The Atlantic ran several corrections, which is "unusual," according to the senior editor who accepted Bloom's submitted article, Garance Franke-Ruta. Bloom's article prompted a rebuttal by University of Iowa president Sally Mason (who said "he does not speak for the university," described the article as "riddled with inaccuracies and factual errors," and said, "the Iowa I see is one of strong, hard-working, and creative people"), an op-ed by four of Bloom's colleagues in the University of Iowa School of Journalism and Mass Communication detailing their "profound and professional disagreement with Professor Bloom concerning the practice of 'good journalism'.'" Peter Feldstein, the photographer with whom Bloom collaborated on the book The Oxford Project, wrote an article in the Cedar Rapids Gazette that concluded, "I wish Stephen Bloom's name was not on The Oxford Project.". Bloom also received almost 250 mails responding to the article on his University of Iowa account; these were made available online to the public after a Freedom of Information Act request by the Iowa City Press-Citizen.

After the controversy erupted, Bloom declined interview requests from Iowa Public Radio, the Des Moines Register, and other Iowa press. He did appear on NBC's Rock Center with Brian Williams on January 2, 2012, telling interviewer Willie Geist, "...this is the way I do it. This is called satire. This is called parody."

== Personal life ==
Stephen Bloom is married, has one son, and lives in Iowa City, Iowa.

== Bibliography ==
- —— (2000). Postville: A Clash of Cultures in Heartland America. Harcourt.
- —— (2002). Inside the Writer's Mind: Writing Narrative Journalism. Iowa State Press.
- —— (2003). The Swedish Wife in The Exquisite Corpse: A Journal of Letters and Life. The Exquisite Corpse.
- —— (2009). Tears of Mermaids: The Secret Story of Pearls. St. Martin's Press.
- —— (2018). The Audacity of Inez Burns: Dreams, Desire, Treachery and Ruin in the City of Gold. Regan Arts.
- —— (2022). Blue Eyes, Brown Eyes: A Cautionary Tale of Race and Brutality. University of California Press.
- —— (2024). The Brazil Chronicles. University of Missouri Press.
