= Yeshiva World News =

Orthodox Jewish online news publication

- Company type: Privately held company
- Website type: News, News aggregation, & blogging
- Available in: English
- Headquarters: Brooklyn, New York, United States
- Area served: United States, Israel
- Founder: Judah (Yehudah) Eckstein
- Key people: Judah (Yehudah) Eckstein, Yechiel Spira, Dov Gefen, Chaim Shapiro, Eli Geffen, Chaim Chernoff, Moshe Altusky, Aliza Levine, & Noach B. Rosen.
- Industry: News
- Website: www.theyeshivaworld.com
- Advertising: Yes
- Registration: Optional
- Current status: Active

Yeshiva World News (YWN) is an Orthodox Jewish online news publication.

== History ==
Yeshiva World News started in 2003 as a news aggregation blog by its founder Judah (Yehudah) Eckstein. It has since grown to an independent news source with freelance reporters and photographers, in addition to continuing as a news aggregator.

The website was redesigned in 2010, and again in 2017. It has sections containing general news items and Israeli news, as well as religious news, and news tailored around Jewish life cycle events and the Jewish calendar. Features relevant to Jewish observance, include articles about Torah and Jewish law (halakha), kosher recipes, and a streaming radio feature.

On March 18, 2026, the site was hacked for a few hours by hackers suspected to be linked to Iran. This happened just weeks into the 2026 Iran war, following a U.S. government assessment that such "low level" cyberattacks were becoming an increasing concern.
