= Postville, Iowa =

- City
- Jewish market and community center in Postville

- Logo
- Motto: "Hometown to the World"
- Location of Postville, Iowa
- Coordinates: 43°05′03″N 91°34′04″W
- Country: United States
- State: Iowa
- Counties: Allamakee, Clayton
- Townships: Post (Allamakee County), Grand Meadow (Clayton County)
- Settled: June 1843
- Incorporated: March 11, 1873
- Named for: Joel Post

Area
  - Total: 2.08 sq mi (5.38 km^{2})
  - Land: 2.08 sq mi (5.38 km^{2})
  - Water: 0 sq mi (0.00 km^{2})
- Elevation: 1,175 ft (358 m)

Population (2020)
  - Total: 2,503
  - Density: 1,205.1/sq mi (465.29/km^{2})
- Time zone: UTC-6 (Central (CST))
  - Summer (DST): UTC-5 (CDT)
- ZIP code: 52162
- Area code: 563
- FIPS code: 19-64290
- GNIS feature ID: 2396261
- Website: www.cityofpostville.com

Postville is a city in Allamakee and Clayton counties in the U.S. state of Iowa. It lies near the junction of four counties and at the intersection of U.S. Routes 18 and 52 and Iowa Highway 51, with airport facilities in the neighboring communities of Waukon, Decorah, Monona and Prairie du Chien. The population was 2,503 at the time of the 2020 census, up from 2,273 in 2000. The city is in Allamakee County's southwestern corner and Clayton County's northwestern corner in a quad county, or four-corner region, where four counties intersect. Winneshiek County is just to the west and Fayette County is just to the southwest of Postville.

== History ==
The area of what is now Postville was first settled in 1843 by pioneer settler and mill worker Joel Post, hence the name of the city. Postville was platted in 1853. The population had ancestry from Germany and Norway. Stephanie Simon of the Los Angeles Times wrote that, until circa the 1990s, "Postville was basically all white and all Christian."

On March 17, 1873, Postville was officially incorporated as a city.

In 1987, a group of Hasidic Jews started Agriprocessors, a Kosher slaughterhouse, in Postville. By 1999, the plant attracted immigrants from various countries, especially those from Latin America and the former Soviet Union. After numerous accusations of mistreatment of cattle, pollution, and violations of labor law, the federal government raided the facility in May 2008, resulting in hundreds of arrests of undocumented workers. Agriprocessors filed for bankruptcy on November 5, 2008; SHF Industries bought the plant at auction in July 2009 and it has resumed production under the new name Agri Star.

== Geography ==
According to the United States Census Bureau, the city has an area of 2.11 square miles (5.46 km^{2}), all land.

=== Climate ===
Climate data for Postville, Iowa (1991–2020 normals, extremes 1897–present)
Month	Jan	Feb	Mar	Apr	May	Jun	Jul	Aug	Sep	Oct	Nov	Dec	Year
Record high °F (°C)	58 (14)	66 (19)	83 (28)	88 (31)	105 (41)	104 (40)	108 (42)	102 (39)	99 (37)	89 (32)	76 (24)	64 (18)	108 (42)
Mean daily maximum °F (°C)	25.7 (−3.5)	29.9 (−1.2)	43.0 (6.1)	57.5 (14.2)	69.4 (20.8)	79.0 (26.1)	82.8 (28.2)	80.8 (27.1)	74.0 (23.3)	60.6 (15.9)	44.7 (7.1)	31.4 (−0.3)	56.6 (13.7)
Daily mean °F (°C)	16.6 (−8.6)	20.2 (−6.6)	32.7 (0.4)	45.8 (7.7)	58.2 (14.6)	68.4 (20.2)	71.9 (22.2)	69.5 (20.8)	61.6 (16.4)	48.8 (9.3)	35.1 (1.7)	22.7 (−5.2)	46.0 (7.8)
Mean daily minimum °F (°C)	7.4 (−13.7)	10.5 (−11.9)	22.4 (−5.3)	34.0 (1.1)	46.9 (8.3)	57.8 (14.3)	60.9 (16.1)	58.2 (14.6)	49.2 (9.6)	37.0 (2.8)	25.5 (−3.6)	14.0 (−10.0)	35.3 (1.8)
Record low °F (°C)	−35 (−37)	−29 (−34)	−18 (−28)	6 (−14)	20 (−7)	34 (1)	39 (4)	35 (2)	20 (−7)	−7 (−22)	−12 (−24)	−27 (−33)	−35 (−37)
Average precipitation inches (mm)	1.12 (28)	1.21 (31)	2.09 (53)	4.14 (105)	4.99 (127)	5.88 (149)	4.52 (115)	4.36 (111)	3.96 (101)	3.00 (76)	2.10 (53)	1.57 (40)	38.94 (989)
Average snowfall inches (cm)	12.0 (30)	10.4 (26)	5.0 (13)	1.6 (4.1)	0.0 (0.0)	0.0 (0.0)	0.0 (0.0)	0.0 (0.0)	0.0 (0.0)	0.1 (0.25)	2.7 (6.9)	8.0 (20)	39.8 (101)
Average precipitation days (≥ 0.01 in)	5.8	5.4	6.7	10.1	12.2	11.2	8.8	9.0	8.5	7.7	5.9	6.1	97.4
Average snowy days (≥ 0.1 in)	5.2	4.5	2.6	0.9	0.0	0.0	0.0	0.0	0.0	0.2	1.6	4.5	19.5
Source: NOAA

== Demographics ==
Historical populations
Year	Pop.	±%
1880	732	—
1890	884	+20.8%
1900	984	+11.3%
1910	952	−3.3%
1920	1,039	+9.1%
1930	1,060	+2.0%
1940	1,194	+12.6%
1950	1,343	+12.5%
1960	1,554	+15.7%
1970	1,546	−0.5%
1980	1,475	−4.6%
1990	1,472	−0.2%
2000	2,273	+54.4%
2010	2,227	−2.0%
2020	2,503	+12.4%
Source:"U.S. Census website". United States Census Bureau. and Iowa Data Center; Source: U.S. Decennial Census

=== 2020 census ===
As of the 2020 census, Postville had a population of 2,503. The median age was 29.4 years. 35.4% of residents were under the age of 18 and 13.6% of residents were 65 years of age or older. For every 100 females there were 102.7 males, and for every 100 females age 18 and over there were 99.1 males age 18 and over.

0.0% of residents lived in urban areas, while 100.0% lived in rural areas.

There were 788 households in Postville, of which 45.3% had children under the age of 18 living in them. Of all households, 47.0% were married-couple households, 20.4% were households with a male householder and no spouse or partner present, and 26.6% were households with a female householder and no spouse or partner present. About 24.8% of all households were made up of individuals and 11.3% had someone living alone who was 65 years of age or older.

The population density was 1,205.7 inhabitants per square mile (465.5/km^{2}). There were 859 housing units at an average density of 413.8 per square mile (159.8/km^{2}), of which 8.3% were vacant. The homeowner vacancy rate was 2.0% and the rental vacancy rate was 9.7%.

Racial composition as of the 2020 census
Race	Number	Percent
White	1,320	52.7%
Black or African American	217	8.7%
American Indian and Alaska Native	71	2.8%
Asian	15	0.6%
Native Hawaiian and Other Pacific Islander	1	0.0%
Some other race	671	26.8%
Two or more races	208	8.3%
Hispanic or Latino (of any race)	1,077	43.0%

=== 2010 census ===
As of the census of 2010, there were 2,227 people, 744 households, and 497 families residing in the city. The population density was 1,055.5 inhabitants per square mile (407.5/km^{2}). There were 902 housing units at an average density of 427.5 per square mile (165.1/km^{2}). The racial makeup of the city was 77.0% White, 4.4% African American, 0.6% Native American, 1.0% Asian, 0.7% Pacific Islander, 14.3% from other races, and 2.0% from two or more races. Hispanic or Latino of any race were 32.0% of the population.

There were 744 households, of which 40.3% had children under the age of 18 living with them, 47.7% were married couples living together, 14.2% had a female householder with no husband present, 4.8% had a male householder with no wife present, and 33.2% were non-families. 26.9% of all households were made up of individuals, and 12.3% had someone living alone who was 65 years of age or older. The average household size was 2.92 and the average family size was 3.54.

The median age in the city was 30.2 years. 32.7% of residents were under the age of 18; 9.8% were between the ages of 18 and 24; 24.6% were from 25 to 44; 18.4% were from 45 to 64; and 14.5% were 65 years of age or older. The gender makeup of the city was 50.4% male and 49.6% female.

=== Ethnic groups ===
In 2017 about one quarter of Postville's population were recent immigrants from Latin America and Somalia; Greg Flakus of Voice of America stated that this was ethnically diverse compared to most Iowa towns, which are almost uniformly non-Hispanic white, even though "Postville is not all that diverse" compared to major American metropolitan areas. The earliest immigrants were from England, Germany, and Scandinavia.

Orthodox Jews established Agriprocessors circa 1987; its founders came from New York City. At its peak, there were about 100 Orthodox Jewish families in Postville. After the 2008 raid, the number declined, and in 2017 there were about 50. Postville has services for Jewish families typically seen in larger communities. It also has a Jewish elementary school and a yeshiva. A Judaic library opened in 2005, but closed after the raid.

The 2008 raid led to the arrests of Hispanics; the resulting lack of labor drew Somalis to Postville from Minnesota and Wisconsin to work in the area kosher factory. Mother Jones said this caused a "cultural shift".

Postville: A Clash of Cultures in Heartland America discusses the arrival of the Orthodox Jews.

== Economy ==
Postville's growth was due to the presence of two large meat processing plants, Agriprocessors and Iowa Turkey Products. The Iowa Turkey Products plant burned in December 2003; it was rebuilt in Marshall, Minnesota.

Agriprocessors, a kosher meat plant, was the largest of its type in the world. As of February 2008 it employed about 900 people and purchased $100 million worth of livestock annually. In May 2008, it was the target of a federal Immigration and Customs Enforcement raid. Subsequently, a criminal complaint was filed against Agriprocessors and its principal for alleged violations of child labor laws. As a result of its legal problems, Agriprocessors became insolvent and was run by a Chapter 11 bankruptcy trustee until SHF Industries bought it at auction in July 2009. It resumed business as Agri Star Meat & Poultry, LLC under the new ownership.

As of 2017, 700 people, more than 30% of the total population, work at Agri Star; about 100 are of Somali origin.

Postville is also the home of a composites factory, Norplex-Micarta, started in 1975. The Norplex factory produces laminated plastics plate, sheet, and profile shapes. As of 2007 it employed between 150 and 200 workers.

== Education ==
Postville Community School District operates public schools. John R. Mott High School is the local high school.

Mesivta of Postville is the area yeshiva.

== Notable people ==
- William McKinley (1879–1964), 44th speaker of the Illinois House of Representatives, raised in Postville
- John R. Mott (1865–1955), recipient of the 1946 Nobel Peace Prize, childhood resident of Postville
- Brett Szabo (born 1968), NBA player, childhood resident of Postville

== Books on Postville ==
- The interaction of long-time Postville residents with newcomers was the subject of a book about the town, Postville: A Clash of Cultures in Heartland America, by Stephen G. Bloom, a professor at University of Iowa.
- A more recent book about the community and its experience with diversity before and after the May 2008 federal immigration raid is Postville USA: Surviving Diversity in Small-Town America by Mark Grey, Michele Devlin, and Aaron Goldsmith.
