= Bison Dele =

American basketball player (1969–2002)

- Born: Brian Carson Williams; April 6, 1969; Fresno, California, U.S.
- Disappeared: July 7, 2002 (aged 33); Tahiti, French Polynesia
- Status: Missing for 24 years, 4 months and 10 days
- Basketball career

Personal information
- Listed height: 6 ft 11 in (2.11 m)
- Listed weight: 260 lb (118 kg)

Career information
- High school: Saint Monica Catholic (Santa Monica, California); Bishop Gorman (Las Vegas, Nevada)
- College: Maryland (1987–1988); Arizona (1988–1991)
- NBA draft: 1991: 1st round, 10th overall pick
- Drafted by: Orlando Magic
- Playing career: 1991–1999
- Position: Center / power forward
- Number: 8, 18

Career history
- 1991–1993: Orlando Magic
- 1993–1995: Denver Nuggets
- 1995–1996: Los Angeles Clippers
- 1997: Chicago Bulls
- 1997–1999: Detroit Pistons

Career highlights
- NBA champion (1997); First-team All-Pac-10 (1991); Third-team Parade All-American (1987); McDonald's All-American (1987)

Career statistics
- Points: 4,536 (11.0 ppg)
- Rebounds: 2,564 (6.2 rpg)
- Blocks: 355 (0.9 bpg)
- Stats at NBA.com
- Stats at Basketball Reference
Medals
Men's basketball
Representing United States
FIBA U19 World Championship
Silver medal – second place	1987 Bormio	Team competition

Bison Dele (/ˈbaɪsən ˈdɛli/ BYE-sən DEL-ee; born Brian Carson Williams; April 6, 1969 – disappeared July 7, 2002) was an American professional basketball player who played center for the Orlando Magic, Denver Nuggets, Los Angeles Clippers, Chicago Bulls and Detroit Pistons of the National Basketball Association (NBA). Dele played college basketball for the Maryland Terrapins and the Arizona Wildcats before being selected by the Magic with the 10th overall pick in the 1991 NBA draft. He won a championship with the Bulls in 1997.

Dele is believed to have been murdered at sea by his older brother, Miles Dabord, in 2002. His girlfriend, Serena Karlan, and skipper Bertrand Saldo are also presumed to have been killed by Dabord, who later intentionally overdosed on insulin and died.

== Early life and NCAA career ==
Williams was born on Easter Sunday, April 6, 1969, in Fresno, California, the second son of Patricia Phillips and of singer Eugene "Geno" Williams Jr. of the musical group The Platters, who later divorced. Patricia Phillips remarried and raised her two sons in Fresno until that marriage ended when Brian was in junior high. He was of African-American descent.

As a junior in high school, he attended Bishop Gorman High School in Las Vegas, Nevada. He averaged 17.3 points, 12.7 rebounds, 2.1 assists, 2.5 steals and 9.1 blocks per game in his senior season, shooting 57.7% from the field. As a senior, he attended Saint Monica Catholic High School in Santa Monica, California, where his jersey is retired. He was a track and field runner, until a high school growth spurt pushed him towards basketball. His collegiate basketball career began at the University of Maryland, where he played for one year before sitting out the next season while transferring to the University of Arizona.

== Professional career ==
After playing for two seasons at Arizona, Williams was drafted with the 10th pick in the first round of the 1991 NBA draft by the Orlando Magic. He saw limited action during two seasons in Orlando.

After playing for Orlando, Williams joined the Denver Nuggets, for whom he played two seasons. In 1993–94, he played a career-high 80 games and averaged 8.0 points per game. Williams then played one year for the Los Angeles Clippers, earning increased playing time and averaging 15.8 points per game. Due to a contract dispute and reports that Williams' asking price was too high, he could not find a team at the beginning of the 1996–97 season, sitting out most of the season. He was then signed by the Chicago Bulls nine games before the end of the season and became an important backup player in the Bulls' run to their fifth championship. Williams finished his career playing two seasons with the Detroit Pistons, where he set career highs of 16.2 points and 8.9 rebounds per game in 1997–98.

In 1998, he changed his name to Bison Dele to honor his Native American (Cherokee) and African ancestry, and played his final season under that name.

=== Retirement ===
Dele suddenly retired from the NBA before the start of the 1999–2000 season at age 30, when he was still in the prime of his career. He had been the Pistons' highest-paid player, but had strained relationships with the organization and decided to walk away from the remaining five years and US$36.45 million on his contract rather than be traded. It has also been theorized he had never been especially passionate about playing basketball and felt he had earned enough money to allow him to walk away from the professional game and lifestyle.

== Personal life ==
Dele reportedly dated Madonna at one point in his career. He played the saxophone, violin and trumpet, enjoyed adventure travel, and earned a pilot's license. After his retirement he spent long periods traveling to Lebanon, the Mediterranean, and the Australian outback before learning to sail and purchasing a catamaran.

== Disappearance ==
On July 6, 2002, Dele sailed from Tahiti on his catamaran, Hukuna Matata (a misspelling of the Swahili phrase hakuna matata). He was joined by his girlfriend, Serena Karlan, his brother, Miles Dabord (born Kevin Williams), and skipper Bertrand Saldo. Dabord was the only person involved in the voyage who was seen or heard from after July 8, 2002, when the last of four satellite phone calls from the voyage was made. Dele and Karlan had previously kept regular contact with their banks and family members. On July 20, Dabord brought the boat into Tahiti; he was alone aboard the vessel.

On September 6, 2002, police used a sting operation organized by Dele's family and friends to detain Dabord in Phoenix. Dabord had forged Dele's signature in order to open mailboxes in his name, and to buy US$152,000 worth of gold under his brother's name, using Dele's passport as identification. Mexican police later found that Dabord had been staying at a hotel in Tijuana, Mexico. Two days before, the Hukuna Matata, which had been registered in Tahiti under another name, was found off the coast of Tahiti with its name plate removed and some possible bullet holes patched. About the same time, Dabord phoned his mother, Patricia Phillips, telling her that he would never hurt Dele and that he could not survive in prison.

The FBI and French authorities became involved in the investigation, found that Dabord bought about $200 of weights and was suspected of using them to weigh down the bodies, and concluded that Dele, Karlan and Saldo were probably murdered and then thrown overboard by Dabord, the weights along with other evidence suggesting that Dabord had planned the murders. Given that the bodies were likely dumped in the middle of the Pacific Ocean, it would be highly unlikely that the three would ever be found.

Dabord, the only first-person source of information regarding the case, intentionally overdosed on insulin and slipped into a coma. On September 27, 2002, Dabord died in a California hospital. In his account of events, Dabord said he and his brother had fought, and that Karlan had been accidentally hit and died when her head struck part of the boat. When Saldo wanted to report her death, a panicked Dele killed him; Dabord then shot his brother in self-defense, threw the bodies overboard and subsequently fled back to the U.S. Special Agent John Steiner, the FBI supervisor on the case, related that the forensic team examining the boat had not found any evidence to support Dabord's story and that "There's just no way it could have happened like that." It is not conclusively known that Dabord's story is false, but the story would not explain why Dabord bought weights, why he allegedly threw all three bodies overboard, why there were patched holes conforming with bullet holes in the boat, why he used his brother's identity, and why he subsequently purposely overdosed on insulin instead of explaining to authorities what had happened, if the story was true. After Dabord's death, officials did not expect to find much more regarding the case. A memorial service was then held for both Dele and Dabord.

The brothers were frequently at odds with each other. A crew member had left the boat because he found the brothers’ fighting unbearable. After Dabord's death, his lawyer and lifelong friend, Paul White, was questioned regarding Dabord but was somewhat evasive and gave little information about what happened.

== Career statistics ==
Legend
GP	Games played	GS	Games started	MPG	Minutes per game
FG%	Field goal percentage	3P%	3-point field goal percentage	FT%	Free throw percentage
RPG	Rebounds per game	APG	Assists per game	SPG	Steals per game
BPG	Blocks per game	PPG	Points per game	**Bold**	Career high
†	Won an NBA championship

=== NBA ===
==== Regular season ====
Year	Team	GP	GS	MPG	FG%	3P%	FT%	RPG	APG	SPG	BPG	PPG
1991–92	Orlando	48	2	18.9	.528	–	.669	5.7	.7	.9	**1.1**	9.1
1992–93	Orlando	21	0	11.4	.513	.000	**.800**	2.7	.2	.7	.8	4.6
1993–94	Denver	**80**	1	18.8	.541	.000	.649	5.6	.6	.6	**1.1**	8.0
1994–95	Denver	63	10	20.0	**.589**	–	.654	4.7	.8	.6	.7	7.9
1995–96	L.A. Clippers	65	65	33.2	.546	.167	.734	7.6	**1.9**	**1.1**	.8	15.8
1996–97†	Chicago	9	0	15.3	.413	–	.733	3.7	1.3	.3	.6	7.0
1997–98	Detroit	78	**78**	**33.6**	.511	**.333**	.707	**8.9**	1.2	.9	.7	**16.2**
1998–99	Detroit	49	48	24.0	.501	.000	.686	5.6	1.4	.8	.8	10.5
Career		413	204	24.2	.528	.143	.691	6.2	1.1	.8	.9	11.0

==== Playoffs ====
Year	Team	GP	GS	MPG	FG%	3P%	FT%	RPG	APG	SPG	BPG	PPG
1994	Denver	12	0	24.1	.553	–	.659	**7.4**	**.9**	.3	**.9**	9.3
1995	Denver	3	0	14.7	.556	–	**1.000**	6.0	.7	.0	.3	8.0
1997†	Chicago	**19**	0	17.7	.481	–	.516	3.7	.6	**1.0**	.4	6.1
1999	Detroit	5	**5**	**24.4**	**.600**	–	.556	6.4	.2	.6	.4	**10.6**
Career		39	5	20.3	.529	–	.612	5.4	.6	.7	.6	7.8

== See also ==
- List of people who disappeared at sea
