= 1996–97 Utah Jazz season =

NBA professional basketball team season

- Conference champions
- Division champions
- Head coach: Jerry Sloan
- General manager: Tim Howells
- Owner: Larry H. Miller
- Arena: Delta Center

Results
- Record: 64–18 (.780)
- Place: Division: 1st (Midwest); Conference: 1st (Western)
- Playoff finish: NBA Finals (lost to Bulls 2–4)
- Stats at Basketball Reference

Local media
- Television: KJZZ-TV; Fox Sports Utah
- Radio: KFNZ

The 1996–97 Utah Jazz season was the 23rd season for the Utah Jazz in the National Basketball Association, and their 18th season in Salt Lake City, Utah.

== Season summary ==
=== Off-season ===
During the off-season, the Jazz redesigned their primary logo, replacing the colors purple, green and yellow with a different shade of purple, light blue, copper and teal to their color scheme of white. The team's primary logo featured the team name "Jazz" in light blue and purple with a teal outline, below purple and white mountains and above a purple basketball with white seams, surrounded by a copper circle with a black outline, featuring the state name Utah in purple letters with a white outline. The team also redesigned their home and road uniforms, which featured the team's primary logo of mountains along with the team name on the front of their jerseys, and a purple, teal, white and copper trim. The white home uniforms featured purple mountains on the front of their jerseys, and the left leg of their shorts, while the road uniforms were changed to a different shade of purple, and featured white and light blue mountains.

The team's new primary logo, and new uniforms would both remain in use until 2004, while the basic design of the logo would last until 2016.

=== Regular season ===
After a 2–2 start to the regular season, the Jazz posted a 15-game winning streak between November and December, and later on held a 33–14 record at the All-Star break. The team posted a 31–4 record for the remainder of the season, in which they posted a seven-game winning streak in February, posted another 15-game winning streak between March and April, and won 19 of their final 20 games. The Jazz finished in first place in the Midwest Division with a franchise-best 64–18 record, and earned the first seed in the Western Conference; the team qualified for the NBA playoffs for the 14th consecutive year. The Jazz also had the second-best home record in the league with a 38–3 record at the Delta Center.

Karl Malone averaged 27.4 points, 9.9 rebounds, 4.5 assists and 1.4 steals per game, and was named the NBA Most Valuable Player of the Year, finishing in first place ahead of All-Star guard Michael Jordan of the Chicago Bulls in Most Valuable Player voting; he was also named to the All-NBA First Team, and to the NBA All-Defensive First Team. In addition, Jeff Hornacek averaged 14.5 points, 4.4 assists and 1.5 steals per game, while John Stockton provided the team with 14.4 points, 10.5 assists and 2.0 steals per game, and was named to the All-NBA Third Team, and to the NBA All-Defensive Second Team. Meanwhile, Bryon Russell showed improvement becoming the team's starting small forward, averaging 10.8 points and 1.4 steals per game, and leading the Jazz with 108 three-point field goals, while second-year center Greg Ostertag averaged 7.3 points and rebounds per game each, and led the team with 2.0 blocks per game. Off the bench, Antoine Carr contributed 7.4 points per game, while rookie shooting guard, and second-round draft pick Shandon Anderson contributed 5.9 points per game, and Howard Eisley provided with 4.5 points and 2.4 assists per game.

During the NBA All-Star weekend at the Gund Arena in Cleveland, Ohio, Malone and Stockton were both selected for the 1997 NBA All-Star Game, as members of the Western Conference All-Star team. However, Malone was booed by the fans at the Gund Arena throughout the entire All-Star Game. Prior to the game, Malone stated that he would rather be at his home in Salt Lake City than play in the All-Star Game in Cleveland; he later on stated that he did not mean to disrespect the city of Cleveland, and that his comments were taken out of context. In addition, Stockton also participated in the NBA Three-Point Shootout for the second time. Stockton finished in 15th place in Most Valuable Player voting, while head coach Jerry Sloan finished in third place in Coach of the Year voting; despite showing a lot of improvement over the previous season, Russell did not receive any votes in Most Improved Player voting.

The Jazz finished fourth in the NBA in home-game attendance, with an attendance of 811,439 at the Delta Center during the regular season.

=== NBA playoffs ===
In the Western Conference First Round of the 1997 NBA playoffs, the Jazz faced off against the 8th–seeded Los Angeles Clippers, a team that featured Loy Vaught, Malik Sealy and Rodney Rogers. The Jazz won the first two games over the Clippers at home at the Delta Center, before winning Game 3 on the road, 104–92 at the Los Angeles Memorial Sports Arena, to win the series in a three-game sweep.

In the Western Conference Semi-finals, the team faced off against the 4th–seeded Los Angeles Lakers, who were led by the trio of All-Star center Shaquille O'Neal, All-Star guard Eddie Jones, and Nick Van Exel. The Jazz won the first two games at the Delta Center, but then lost Game 3 to the Lakers on the road, 104–84 at the Great Western Forum. The Jazz managed to win the next two games, which included a Game 5 win over the Lakers at the Delta Center, 98–93 to win the series in five games.

In the Western Conference Finals, the Jazz then faced off against the 3rd–seeded Houston Rockets, who were led by the All-Star trio of Hakeem Olajuwon, Charles Barkley and Clyde Drexler. The Jazz won the first two games at the Delta Center to take a 2–0 series lead. However, the Rockets managed to win the next two games to even the series, as Rockets forward Eddie Johnson hit a dramatic three-point shot at the buzzer to win Game 4, 95–92 at The Summit. After winning Game 5 at the Delta Center, 96–91, Game 6 at The Summit appeared to be heading into overtime, until Stockton hit a game-winning three-pointer at the buzzer, as the Jazz defeated the Rockets, 103–100 to win the series in six games, and advance to the NBA Finals for the first time in franchise history.

In the 1997 NBA Finals, the Jazz faced off against the top–seeded, and defending NBA champion Bulls, who were led by the trio of Jordan, All-Star forward Scottie Pippen, and rebound-specialist Dennis Rodman. The Jazz lost the first two games to the Bulls on the road at the United Center, but then won their next two home games to even the series at 2–2. In Game 5 at the Delta Center, which was known as "The Flu Game", Jordan scored 38 points in 44 minutes, as the Bulls defeated the Jazz, 90–88 to take a 3–2 series lead. The Jazz lost Game 6 to the Bulls at the United Center, 90–86, thus losing the series in six games, as the Bulls won their second consecutive NBA championship, and their fifth title in seven years.

=== Notable highlights ===
One notable highlight of the season occurred on November 27, 1996, in which the Jazz trailed 70–36 at halftime to the Denver Nuggets at the Delta Center, but came back from a 34-point deficit, outscoring the Nuggets 71–33 in the second half to win the game, 107–103.

== Draft picks ==
| Round | Pick | Player | Position | Nationality | College |
|---|---|---|---|---|---|
| 1 | 25 | Martin Müürsepp | PF/SF | Estonia | |
| 2 | 54 | Shandon Anderson | SF/SG | United States | Georgia |

== Roster ==
1996–97 Utah Jazz roster
Players

| Pos. | No. | Player | Height | Weight | DOB | From |
|---|---|---|---|---|---|---|
| G | 40 | Shandon Anderson | 6 ft 6 in (1.98 m) | 208 lb (94 kg) | 1973–12–31 | Georgia |
| F | 55 | Antoine Carr | 6 ft 9 in (2.06 m) | 225 lb (102 kg) | 1961–07–23 | Wichita State |
| G | 10 | Howard Eisley | 6 ft 2 in (1.88 m) | 177 lb (80 kg) | 1972–12–04 | Boston College |
| C | 44 | Greg Foster | 6 ft 11 in (2.11 m) | 240 lb (109 kg) | 1968–10–03 | UTEP |
| G | 14 | Jeff Hornacek | 6 ft 3 in (1.91 m) | 190 lb (86 kg) | 1963–05–03 | Iowa State |
| F | 43 | Stephen Howard | 6 ft 9 in (2.06 m) | 230 lb (104 kg) | 1970–05–15 | DePaul |
| F | 31 | Adam Keefe | 6 ft 9 in (2.06 m) | 230 lb (104 kg) | 1970–02–22 | Stanford |
| F | 32 | Karl Malone | 6 ft 9 in (2.06 m) | 250 lb (113 kg) | 1963–07–24 | Louisiana Tech |
| F | 34 | Chris Morris | 6 ft 8 in (2.03 m) | 210 lb (95 kg) | 1966–01–20 | Auburn |
| C | 00 | Greg Ostertag | 7 ft 2 in (2.18 m) | 280 lb (127 kg) | 1973–03–06 | Kansas |
| F | 3 | Bryon Russell | 6 ft 7 in (2.01 m) | 225 lb (102 kg) | 1970–12–31 | Long Beach State |
| G | 12 | John Stockton | 6 ft 1 in (1.85 m) | 170 lb (77 kg) | 1962–03–26 | Gonzaga |

Coaches
Head coach
- Jerry Sloan
Assistant(s)
- Gordon Chiesa
- David Fredman
- Phil Johnson
- Kenny Natt

Legend
- (DP) Unsigned draft pick
- (FA) Free agent
- (S) Suspended
- Injured

Roster
Updated: March 5, 1997

=== Roster Notes ===
- Small forward Jamie Watson was waived on March 5, 1997.

== Regular season ==
=== Season standings ===
| Midwest Division | W | L | PCT | GB | Home | Road | Div |
|---|---|---|---|---|---|---|---|
| y-Utah Jazz | 64 | 18 | .780 | – | 38–3 | 26–15 | 19–5 |
| x-Houston Rockets | 57 | 25 | .695 | 7 | 30–11 | 27–14 | 19–5 |
| x-Minnesota Timberwolves | 40 | 42 | .488 | 24 | 25–16 | 15–26 | 16–8 |
| Dallas Mavericks | 24 | 58 | .293 | 40 | 14–27 | 10–31 | 9–15 |
| Denver Nuggets | 21 | 61 | .256 | 43 | 12–29 | 9–32 | 7–17 |
| San Antonio Spurs | 20 | 62 | .244 | 44 | 12–29 | 8–33 | 8–16 |
| Vancouver Grizzlies | 14 | 68 | .171 | 50 | 8–33 | 6–35 | 6–18 |

1996–97 NBA West standings
| # | Western Conference | | | | |
| # | Team | W | L | PCT | GB |
|---|---|---|---|---|---|
| 1 | c-Utah Jazz | 64 | 18 | .780 | – |
| 2 | y-Seattle SuperSonics | 57 | 25 | .695 | 7 |
| 3 | x-Houston Rockets | 57 | 25 | .695 | 7 |
| 4 | x-Los Angeles Lakers | 56 | 26 | .683 | 8 |
| 5 | x-Portland Trail Blazers | 49 | 33 | .598 | 15 |
| 6 | x-Minnesota Timberwolves | 40 | 42 | .488 | 24 |
| 7 | x-Phoenix Suns | 40 | 42 | .488 | 24 |
| 8 | x-Los Angeles Clippers | 36 | 46 | .439 | 28 |
| 9 | Sacramento Kings | 34 | 48 | .415 | 30 |
| 10 | Golden State Warriors | 30 | 52 | .366 | 34 |
| 11 | Dallas Mavericks | 24 | 58 | .293 | 40 |
| 12 | Denver Nuggets | 21 | 61 | .256 | 43 |
| 13 | San Antonio Spurs | 20 | 62 | .244 | 44 |
| 14 | Vancouver Grizzlies | 14 | 68 | .171 | 50 |

z – clinched division title
y – clinched division title
x – clinched playoff spot

=== Game log ===
1996–97 game log
Total: 64–18 (home: 38–3; road: 26–15)
November: 11–2 (home: 8–1; road: 3–1)

| Game | Date | Team | Score | High points | High rebounds | High assists | Location Attendance | Record |
|---|---|---|---|---|---|---|---|---|
| 1 | November 1 | Seattle | W 99–91 | Karl Malone (27) | Karl Malone (13) | Hornacek, Stockton (8) | Delta Center; 19,911 | 1–0 |
| 2 | November 2 | @ L.A. Clippers | W 95–90 | Karl Malone (21) | Karl Malone (12) | John Stockton (7) | Los Angeles Memorial Sports Arena; 13,041 | 2–0 |
| 3 | November 4 | Houston | L 72–75 | Karl Malone (16) | Karl Malone (14) | Jeff Hornacek (5) | Delta Center; 19,911 | 2–1 |
| 4 | November 9 | @ Houston | L 85–91 | Karl Malone (32) | Karl Malone (11) | John Stockton (6) | The Summit; 16,285 | 2–2 |
| 5 | November 13 | Sacramento | W 105–74 | Karl Malone (22) | Greg Ostertag (13) | John Stockton (10) | Delta Center; 19,283 | 3–2 |
| 6 | November 15 | Vancouver | W 104–96 | Karl Malone (21) | Greg Ostertag (20) | John Stockton (18) | Delta Center; 19,046 | 4–2 |
| 7 | November 16 | @ Dallas | W 88–87 | John Stockton (23) | Byron Russell (13) | John Stockton (8) | Reunion Arena; 15,947 | 5–2 |
| 8 | November 20 | @ L.A. Lakers | W 113–97 | Karl Malone (37) | Greg Ostertag (9) | John Stockton (13) | Great Western Forum; 16,122 | 6–2 |
| 9 | November 21 | Golden State | W 109–104 (OT) | Karl Malone (33) | Karl Malone (13) | John Stockton (15) | Delta Center; 18,889 | 7–2 |
| 10 | November 23 | Chicago | W 105–100 | Karl Malone (36) | Karl Malone (15) | John Stockton (13) | Delta Center; 19,911 | 8–2 |
| 11 | November 25 | New Jersey | W 108–92 | Karl Malone (27) | Karl Malone (16) | John Stockton (13) | Delta Center; 19,132 | 9–2 |
| 12 | November 27 | Denver | W 107–103 | Karl Malone (31) | Karl Malone (17) | John Stockton (10) | Delta Center; 19,324 | 10–2 |
| 13 | November 29 | L.A. Clippers | W 111–94 | John Stockton (28) | Greg Ostertag (14) | John Stockton (10) | Delta Center; 19,381 | 11–2 |

December: 11–5 (home: 7–1; road: 4–4)

| Game | Date | Team | Score | High points | High rebounds | High assists | Location Attendance | Record |
|---|---|---|---|---|---|---|---|---|
| 14 | December 1 | @ Seattle | W 96–90 | Karl Malone (30) | Karl Malone (13) | John Stockton (12) | KeyArena; 17,072 | 12–2 |
| 15 | December 2 | Charlotte | W 107–97 | John Stockton (22) | Karl Malone (11) | John Stockton (16) | Delta Center; 19,410 | 13–2 |
| 16 | December 4 | L.A. Lakers | W 101–75 | Karl Malone (26) | Karl Malone (8) | John Stockton (7) | Delta Center; 19,911 | 14–2 |
| 17 | December 6 | Minnesota | W 106–95 | Karl Malone (34) | Greg Ostertag (8) | John Stockton (16) | Delta Center; 19,911 | 15–2 |
| 18 | December 7 | @ Denver | W 104–91 | Karl Malone (21) | Karl Malone (9) | John Stockton (12) | McNichols Sports Arena; 12,837 | 16–2 |
| 19 | December 10 | Indiana | W 110–86 | Karl Malone (22) | Greg Ostertag (15) | John Stockton (9) | Delta Center; 19,911 | 17–2 |
| 20 | December 12 | Phoenix | L 87–95 | Karl Malone (27) | Karl Malone (12) | John Stockton (11) | Delta Center; 19,911 | 17–3 |
| 21 | December 14 | Orlando | W 101–68 | Ostertag, Stockton (16) | Greg Ostertag (16) | John Stockton (8) | Delta Center; 19,911 | 18–3 |
| 22 | December 17 | @ New York | L 94–99 | Karl Malone (29) | Karl Malone (14) | John Stockton (5) | Madison Square Garden; 19,763 | 18–4 |
| 23 | December 19 | @ Miami | W 94–87 (OT) | Karl Malone (35) | Karl Malone (16) | John Stockton (10) | Miami Arena; 14,919 | 19–4 |
| 24 | December 20 | @ Orlando | W 98–93 | John Stockton (22) | Karl Malone (6) | John Stockton (15) | Orlando Arena; 17,248 | 20–4 |
| 25 | December 22 | @ Cleveland | L 94–100 | Karl Malone (20) | Karl Malone (12) | John Stockton (9) | Gund Arena; 17,205 | 20–5 |
| 26 | December 23 | @ Minnesota | L 98–107 | Karl Malone (22) | Karl Malone (13) | John Stockton (13) | Target Center; 14,434 | 20–6 |
| 27 | December 26 | Portland | W 99–94 | Karl Malone (24) | Karl Malone (9) | John Stockton (11) | Delta Center; 19,911 | 21–6 |
| 28 | December 28 | Philadelphia | W 110–84 | Karl Malone (29) | Karl Malone (14) | John Stockton (14) | Delta Center; 19,911 | 22–6 |
| 29 | December 30 | @ L.A. Clippers | L 101–115 | John Stockton (23) | Karl Malone (10) | John Stockton (7) | Los Angeles Memorial Sports Arena; 7,865 | 22–7 |

January: 9–6 (home: 5–0; road: 4–6)

| Game | Date | Team | Score | High points | High rebounds | High assists | Location Attendance | Record |
|---|---|---|---|---|---|---|---|---|
| 30 | January 2 | @ San Antonio | L 80–83 | Karl Malone (26) | Karl Malone (7) | John Stockton (11) | Alamodome; 15,220 | 22–8 |
| 31 | January 4 | Miami | W 83–80 | Karl Malone (28) | Karl Malone (12) | John Stockton (11) | Delta Center; 19,911 | 23–8 |
| 32 | January 6 | @ Chicago | L 89–102 | Karl Malone (27) | Karl Malone (11) | John Stockton (11) | United Center; 23,882 | 23–9 |
| 33 | January 8 | @ Milwaukee | L 112–119 (OT) | Karl Malone (38) | Karl Malone (19) | Karl Malone (8) | Bradley Center; 13,682 | 23–10 |
| 34 | January 9 | @ Toronto | L 96–110 | Karl Malone (24) | Karl Malone (10) | John Stockton (14) | SkyDome; 16,517 | 23–11 |
| 35 | January 11 | @ Detroit | L 77–87 | Karl Malone (19) | Greg Ostertag (10) | John Stockton (10) | The Palace of Auburn Hills; 21,454 | 23–12 |
| 36 | January 13 | @ Philadelphia | W 97–96 (OT) | Karl Malone (28) | Karl Malone (9) | John Stockton (7) | CoreStates Center; 13,438 | 24–12 |
| 37 | January 16 | Phoenix | W 95–91 | Karl Malone (28) | Karl Malone (11) | John Stockton (9) | Delta Center; 19,911 | 25–12 |
| 38 | January 17 | @ Vancouver | W 106–68 | Karl Malone (30) | Howard, Keefe (9) | Jeff Hornacek (8) | General Motors Place; 15,173 | 26–12 |
| 39 | January 19 | @ Portland | L 96–102 | Jeff Hornacek (22) | Karl Malone (10) | John Stockton (10) | Rose Garden; 21,166 | 26–13 |
| 40 | January 20 | Cleveland | W 94–74 | Karl Malone (32) | Karl Malone (8) | Hornacek, Stockton (6) | Delta Center; 19,911 | 27–13 |
| 41 | January 22 | @ Phoenix | W 111–99 | Karl Malone (41) | Karl Malone (8) | John Stockton (12) | America West Arena; 19,023 | 28–13 |
| 42 | January 25 | @ Houston | W 105–100 (OT) | Karl Malone (27) | Karl Malone (17) | John Stockton (11) | The Summit; 16,285 | 29–13 |
| 43 | January 28 | Denver | W 114–99 | Karl Malone (28) | Malone, Ostertag (13) | John Stockton (9) | Delta Center; 19,911 | 30–13 |
| 44 | January 30 | Atlanta | W 102–96 | Karl Malone (32) | Karl Malone (15) | John Stockton (11) | Delta Center; 19,911 | 31–13 |

February: 9–3 (home: 7–1; road: 2–2)

| Game | Date | Team | Score | High points | High rebounds | High assists | Location Attendance | Record |
|---|---|---|---|---|---|---|---|---|
| 45 | February 1 | @ Dallas | L 97–100 | Karl Malone (36) | Malone, Russell (11) | John Stockton (13) | Reunion Arena; 17,185 | 31–14 |
| 46 | February 3 | Washington | W 111–89 | Karl Malone (24) | Karl Malone (10) | Howard Eisley (9) | Delta Center; 19,911 | 32–14 |
| 47 | February 5 | @ Seattle | W 99–95 | Karl Malone (26) | Greg Ostertag (10) | John Stockton (13) | KeyArena; 17,072 | 33–14 |
All-Star Break
| 48 | February 11 | @ Sacramento | W 120–98 | Karl Malone (30) | Karl Malone (8) | John Stockton (16) | ARCO Arena; 17,317 | 34–14 |
| 49 | February 13 | Portland | W 110–86 | Karl Malone (24) | Karl Malone (11) | John Stockton (13) | Delta Center; 19,911 | 35–14 |
| 50 | February 15 | Dallas | W 99–84 | Jeff Hornacek (18) | Greg Ostertag (12) | John Stockton (8) | Delta Center; 19,911 | 36–14 |
| 51 | February 18 | San Antonio | W 113–105 | Karl Malone (37) | Greg Ostertag (10) | John Stockton (10) | Delta Center; 19,911 | 37–14 |
| 52 | February 20 | Boston | W 122–105 | Karl Malone (34) | Karl Malone (16) | John Stockton (11) | Delta Center; 19,911 | 38–14 |
| 53 | February 23 | Seattle | L 87–89 (OT) | Karl Malone (32) | Karl Malone (10) | John Stockton (12) | Delta Center; 19,911 | 38–15 |
| 54 | February 25 | New York | W 110–99 | Karl Malone (33) | Greg Ostertag (13) | John Stockton (12) | Delta Center; 19,911 | 39–15 |
| 55 | February 27 | Toronto | W 118–114 | Karl Malone (32) | Karl Malone (13) | John Stockton (13) | Delta Center; 19,911 | 40–15 |
| 56 | February 28 | @ Portland | L 105–115 | Karl Malone (30) | Karl Malone (6) | John Stockton (11) | Rose Garden; 21,253 | 40–16 |

March: 14–1 (home: 4–0; road: 10–1)

| Game | Date | Team | Score | High points | High rebounds | High assists | Location Attendance | Record |
|---|---|---|---|---|---|---|---|---|
| 57 | March 2 | @ Vancouver | W 93–86 | Bryon Russell (20) | Malone, Ostertag (9) | John Stockton (16) | General Motors Place; 16,415 | 41–16 |
| 58 | March 3 | @ Golden State | W 111–104 | Karl Malone (41) | Karl Malone (7) | Stockton, Hornacek (8) | San Jose Arena; 16,334 | 42–16 |
| 59 | March 5 | Dallas | W 96–65 | Karl Malone (20) | Greg Ostertag (13) | Karl Malone (7) | Delta Center; 19,911 | 43–16 |
| 60 | March 7 | Detroit | W 95–88 | Karl Malone (41) | Greg Ostertag (10) | Stockton, Hornacek (9) | Delta Center; 19,911 | 44–16 |
| 61 | March 9 | @ Minnesota | W 115–106 | Karl Malone (36) | Karl Malone (11) | John Stockton (9) | Target Center; 19,006 | 45–16 |
| 62 | March 11 | @ Atlanta | L 99–106 | Karl Malone (24) | Karl Malone (7) | John Stockton (10) | The Omni; 14,475 | 45–17 |
| 63 | March 12 | @ New Jersey | W 117–102 | John Stockton (31) | Greg Ostertag (19) | John Stockton (11) | Continental Airlines Arena; 13,150 | 46–17 |
| 64 | March 14 | @ Indiana | W 105–96 | Karl Malone (38) | Karl Malone (11) | John Stockton (10) | Market Square Arena; 16,618 | 47–17 |
| 65 | March 15 | @ Washington | W 100–93 | Karl Malone (32) | Karl Malone (10) | John Stockton (12) | US Airways Arena; 18,756 | 48–17 |
| 66 | March 17 | @ Charlotte | W 114–93 | Karl Malone (37) | Karl Malone (9) | Jeff Hornacek (12) | Charlotte Coliseum; 24,042 | 49–17 |
| 67 | March 19 | @ Boston | W 113–100 | Karl Malone (32) | Karl Malone (12) | John Stockton (10) | Fleet Center; 16,770 | 50–17 |
| 68 | March 22 | L.A. Clippers | W 107–94 | Karl Malone (20) | Greg Ostertag (14) | John Stockton (12) | Delta Center; 19,911 | 51–17 |
| 69 | March 23 | @ Denver | W 120–103 | Karl Malone (35) | Karl Malone (8) | John Stockton (15) | McNichols Sports Arena; 10,723 | 52–17 |
| 70 | March 28 | Milwaukee | W 101–96 | Karl Malone (31) | Greg Ostertag (18) | John Stockton (10) | Delta Center; 19,911 | 53–17 |
| 71 | March 29 | @ San Antonio | W 115–102 | Karl Malone (33) | Karl Malone (12) | John Stockton (10) | Alamodome; 25,705 | 54–17 |

April: 10–1 (home: 7–0; road: 3–1)

| Game | Date | Team | Score | High points | High rebounds | High assists | Location Attendance | Record |
|---|---|---|---|---|---|---|---|---|
| 72 | April 2 | Sacramento | W 118–87 | Karl Malone (23) | Greg Ostertag (11) | Howard Eisley (9) | Delta Center; 19,911 | 55–17 |
| 73 | April 4 | Vancouver | W 106–79 | Karl Malone (16) | Greg Ostertag (10) | John Stockton (12) | Delta Center; 19,911 | 56–17 |
| 74 | April 6 | @ Golden State | W 114–100 | Karl Malone (30) | Karl Malone (8) | John Stockton (13) | San Jose Arena; 15,167 | 57–17 |
| 75 | April 7 | San Antonio | W 116–93 | Karl Malone (26) | Greg Ostertag (9) | John Stockton (8) | Delta Center; 19,911 | 58–17 |
| 76 | April 9 | L.A. Lakers | W 101–89 | Karl Malone (29) | Byron Russell (9) | John Stockton (10) | Delta Center; 19,911 | 59–17 |
| 77 | April 11 | Houston | W 104–83 | Karl Malone (28) | Karl Malone (13) | John Stockton (8) | Delta Center; 19,911 | 60–17 |
| 78 | April 13 | @ L.A. Lakers | L 98–100 | John Stockton (30) | Greg Ostertag (13) | John Stockton (9) | Great Western Forum; 17,505 | 60–18 |
| 79 | April 15 | @ Phoenix | W 127–122 | Karl Malone (31) | Karl Malone (11) | John Stockton (14) | America West Arena; 19,023 | 61–18 |
| 80 | April 17 | Golden State | W 106–93 | Karl Malone (20) | three players tied (4) | three players tied (6) | Delta Center; 19,911 | 62–18 |
| 81 | April 19 | Minnesota | W 101–89 | Karl Malone (26) | Ostertag, Russell (8) | John Stockton (12) | Delta Center; 19,911 | 63–18 |
| 82 | April 20 | @ Sacramento | W 113–109 | Karl Malone (18) | Karl Malone (6) | John Stockton (14) | ARCO Arena; 17,317 | 64–18 |

1996–97 schedule

== Playoffs ==
1997 playoff game log
Western Conference First Round: 3–0 (home: 2–0; road: 1–0)

| Game | Date | Team | Score | High points | High rebounds | High assists | Location Attendance | Series |
|---|---|---|---|---|---|---|---|---|
| 1 | April 24 | L.A. Clippers | W 106–86 | Karl Malone (27) | Karl Malone (10) | John Stockton (17) | Delta Center; 19,911 | 1–0 |
| 2 | April 26 | L.A. Clippers | W 105–99 | Karl Malone (39) | Karl Malone (11) | Hornacek, Stockton (4) | Delta Center; 19,911 | 2–0 |
| 3 | April 28 | @ L.A. Clippers | W 104–92 | Karl Malone (26) | Karl Malone (13) | John Stockton (13) | Los Angeles Memorial Sports Arena; 11,747 | 3–0 |

Western Conference Semifinals: 4–1 (home: 3–0; road: 1–1)

| Game | Date | Team | Score | High points | High rebounds | High assists | Location Attendance | Series |
|---|---|---|---|---|---|---|---|---|
| 1 | May 4 | L.A. Lakers | W 93–77 | Karl Malone (23) | Karl Malone (13) | Jeff Hornacek (7) | Delta Center; 19,911 | 1–0 |
| 2 | May 6 | L.A. Lakers | W 103–101 | Karl Malone (31) | Karl Malone (11) | Hornacek, Stockton (7) | Delta Center; 19,911 | 2–0 |
| 3 | May 8 | @ L.A. Lakers | L 84–104 | Jeff Hornacek (26) | Karl Malone (10) | John Stockton (8) | Great Western Forum; 17,505 | 2–1 |
| 4 | May 10 | @ L.A. Lakers | W 110–95 | Bryon Russell (29) | Bryon Russell (10) | John Stockton (11) | Great Western Forum; 17,505 | 3–1 |
| 5 | May 12 | L.A. Lakers | W 98–93 (OT) | Karl Malone (32) | Karl Malone (20) | John Stockton (10) | Delta Center; 19,911 | 4–1 |

Western Conference Finals: 4–2 (home: 3–0; road: 1–2)

| Game | Date | Team | Score | High points | High rebounds | High assists | Location Attendance | Series |
|---|---|---|---|---|---|---|---|---|
| 1 | May 19 | Houston | W 101–86 | Karl Malone (21) | Karl Malone (13) | John Stockton (13) | Delta Center; 19,911 | 1–0 |
| 2 | May 21 | Houston | W 104–92 | John Stockton (26) | Karl Malone (15) | John Stockton (12) | Delta Center; 19,911 | 2–0 |
| 3 | May 23 | @ Houston | L 100–118 | Karl Malone (21) | Greg Ostertag (9) | John Stockton (10) | The Summit; 16,285 | 2–1 |
| 4 | May 25 | @ Houston | L 92–95 | Malone, Stockton (22) | Karl Malone (10) | John Stockton (8) | The Summit; 16,285 | 2–2 |
| 5 | May 27 | Houston | W 96–91 | Karl Malone (29) | Karl Malone (14) | John Stockton (6) | Delta Center; 19,911 | 3–2 |
| 6 | May 29 | @ Houston | W 103–100 | John Stockton (25) | Greg Ostertag (14) | John Stockton (13) | The Summit; 16,285 | 4–2 |

NBA Finals: 2–4 (home: 2–1; road: 0–3)

| Game | Date | Team | Score | High points | High rebounds | High assists | Location Attendance | Series |
|---|---|---|---|---|---|---|---|---|
| 1 | June 1 | @ Chicago | L 82–84 | Karl Malone (23) | Karl Malone (15) | John Stockton (12) | United Center; 24,544 | 0–1 |
| 2 | June 4 | @ Chicago | L 85–97 | Karl Malone (20) | Karl Malone (13) | John Stockton (7) | United Center; 24,544 | 0–2 |
| 3 | June 6 | Chicago | W 104–93 | Karl Malone (37) | Karl Malone (10) | John Stockton (12) | Delta Center; 19,911 | 1–2 |
| 4 | June 8 | Chicago | W 78–73 | Karl Malone (23) | Karl Malone (10) | John Stockton (12) | Delta Center; 19,911 | 2–2 |
| 5 | June 11 | Chicago | L 88–90 | Karl Malone (19) | Greg Ostertag (15) | Karl Malone (6) | Delta Center; 19,911 | 2–3 |
| 6 | June 13 | @ Chicago | L 86–90 | Karl Malone (21) | Greg Ostertag (8) | John Stockton (5) | United Center; 24,544 | 2–4 |

1997 schedule

=== NBA Finals ===
In the Finals, the Jazz faced the Chicago Bulls losing the first two games on the road. However, the Jazz upon arriving at the Delta Center continued their home court advantage by taking Game 3, and Game 4 to even the series. With a chance to take a series lead in Game 5, the Jazz were beaten by a heroic performance by Michael Jordan playing with the flu like ailment 90–88. Back in Chicago for Game 6, the Jazz battled the Bulls tightly before falling by four points as the Bulls won their fifth title in seven years.

== Player statistics ==
Legend
| GP | Games played | GS | Games started | MPG | Minutes per game |
| FG% | Field-goal percentage | 3P% | 3-point field-goal percentage | FT% | Free-throw percentage |
| RPG | Rebounds per game | APG | Assists per game | SPG | Steals per game |
| BPG | Blocks per game | PPG | Points per game |

=== Season ===
| Player | GP | GS | MPG | FG% | 3FG% | FT% | RPG | APG | SPG | BPG | PPG |
|---|---|---|---|---|---|---|---|---|---|---|---|
| Shandon Anderson | 65 | 0 | 16.4 | .462 | .511 | .687 | 2.8 | .8 | .4 | .1 | 5.9 |
| Antoine Carr | 82 | 0 | 17.8 | .483 | .000 | .780 | 2.4 | .9 | .3 | .8 | 7.4 |
| Howard Eisley | 82 | 0 | 13.2 | .451 | .278 | .787 | 1.0 | 2.4 | .5 | .1 | 4.5 |
| Greg Foster | 79 | 12 | 11.6 | .453 | .667 | .831 | 2.4 | .4 | .1 | .3 | 3.5 |
| Jeff Hornacek | 82 | 82 | 31.6 | .482 | .369 | .899 | 2.9 | 4.4 | 1.5 | .3 | 14.5 |
| Stephen Howard^{†} | 42 | 0 | 8.3 | .573 | | .597 | 1.8 | .2 | .3 | .2 | 3.6 |
| Adam Keefe | 62 | 0 | 14.8 | .513 | .000 | .689 | 3.5 | .5 | .5 | .2 | 3.8 |
| Karl Malone | 82 | 82 | 36.6 | .550 | .000 | .755 | 9.9 | 4.5 | 1.4 | .6 | 27.4 |
| Chris Morris | 73 | 1 | 13.4 | .408 | .274 | .722 | 2.2 | .6 | .4 | .3 | 4.3 |
| Ruben Nembhard^{†} | 8 | 0 | 11.8 | .414 | .000 | .800 | 1.0 | 1.5 | .8 | .0 | 4.0 |
| Greg Ostertag | 77 | 70 | 23.6 | .515 | .000 | .678 | 7.3 | .4 | .3 | 2.0 | 7.3 |
| Bryon Russell | 81 | 81 | 31.2 | .479 | .409 | .701 | 4.1 | 1.5 | 1.6 | .3 | 10.8 |
| John Stockton | 82 | 82 | 35.3 | .548 | .422 | .846 | 2.8 | 10.5 | 2.0 | .2 | 14.4 |
| Brooks Thompson^{†} | 2 | 0 | 4.0 | .000 | | | .0 | .5 | .0 | .0 | .0 |
| Jamie Watson^{†} | 13 | 0 | 9.9 | .440 | .333 | .833 | 1.4 | .8 | .8 | .2 | 2.5 |

=== Playoffs ===
| Player | GP | GS | MPG | FG% | 3FG% | FT% | RPG | APG | SPG | BPG | PPG |
|---|---|---|---|---|---|---|---|---|---|---|---|
| Shandon Anderson | 18 | 0 | 16.4 | .439 | .417 | .714 | 2.7 | .7 | .6 | .1 | 4.6 |
| Antoine Carr | 20 | 0 | 14.0 | .482 | | .750 | 2.0 | .5 | .3 | .5 | 4.9 |
| Howard Eisley | 20 | 0 | 10.9 | .500 | .474 | .964 | .9 | 2.0 | .2 | .0 | 5.6 |
| Greg Foster | 20 | 0 | 15.5 | .389 | .250 | .867 | 2.8 | .6 | .2 | .4 | 4.2 |
| Jeff Hornacek | 20 | 20 | 35.2 | .433 | .358 | .876 | 4.5 | 3.7 | 1.1 | .2 | 14.6 |
| Stephen Howard | 5 | 0 | 2.6 | .500 | | .750 | .2 | .0 | .2 | .0 | 1.8 |
| Adam Keefe | 8 | 0 | 7.4 | .333 | | .667 | 2.0 | .3 | .3 | .1 | 1.0 |
| Karl Malone | 20 | 20 | 40.8 | .435 | .500 | .720 | 11.4 | 2.9 | 1.4 | .8 | 26.0 |
| Chris Morris | 20 | 0 | 8.8 | .400 | .320 | .600 | 1.6 | .3 | .4 | .2 | 2.9 |
| Greg Ostertag | 20 | 20 | 23.0 | .410 | | .743 | 6.9 | .3 | .5 | 2.4 | 4.7 |
| Bryon Russell | 20 | 20 | 37.9 | .461 | .356 | .721 | 4.6 | 1.4 | 1.1 | .3 | 12.3 |
| John Stockton | 20 | 20 | 37.0 | .521 | .380 | .856 | 3.9 | 9.6 | 1.7 | .3 | 16.1 |

Player statistics citation:

== Awards and records ==
=== Awards ===
- Karl Malone, NBA Most Valuable Player Award
- Karl Malone, All-NBA First Team
- John Stockton, All-NBA Third Team
- Karl Malone, NBA All-Defensive First Team
- John Stockton, NBA All-Defensive Second Team

== Transactions ==
=== Free agents ===
==== Additions ====
| Player | Signed | Former team |

==== Subtractions ====
| Player | Left | New team |
