= 1996–97 Charlotte Hornets season =

NBA professional basketball team season

- Head coach: Dave Cowens
- General manager: Bob Bass
- Owner: George Shinn
- Arena: Charlotte Coliseum

Results
- Record: 54–28 (.659)
- Place: Division: 4th (Central); Conference: 6th (Eastern)
- Playoff finish: First round (lost to Knicks 0–3)
- Stats at Basketball Reference

Local media
- Television: Fox Sports South; WJZY; WFVT
- Radio: WBT

The 1996–97 Charlotte Hornets season was the ninth season for the Charlotte Hornets in the National Basketball Association. For the first time since the 1990–91 season, Larry Johnson was not on the team's opening day roster.

== Season summary ==
=== Off-season ===
The Hornets received the 13th overall pick in the 1996 NBA draft, and selected shooting guard, and high school basketball star Kobe Bryant; the team also selected shooting guard Tony Delk from the University of Kentucky with the 16th overall pick. However, the Hornets soon traded Bryant to the Los Angeles Lakers in exchange for Vlade Divac, acquired Anthony Mason from the New York Knicks, and signed free agent Tony Smith during the off-season. The team also hired former Boston Celtics star Dave Cowens as their new head coach.

=== Regular season ===
Under Cowens, and with the addition of Divac and Mason, the Hornets struggled with an 8–9 start to the regular season, but then won 21 of their next 31 games, holding a 29–19 record at the All-Star break. At mid-season, the team signed free agent, and former All-Star forward Tom Chambers in January, then traded Scott Burrell to the Golden State Warriors in exchange for Donald Royal, and traded second-year guard Anthony Goldwire, and second-year center George Zidek to the Denver Nuggets in exchange for Ricky Pierce in February. However, Chambers was released to free agency after 12 games. The Hornets posted a nine-game winning streak in April, and finished in fourth place in the Central Division with a franchise-best 54–28 record, earning the sixth seed in the Eastern Conference, and making it back to the NBA playoffs after a one-year absence.

Glen Rice averaged a career-high of 26.8 points per game, led the Hornets with 207 three-point field goals, and shot .470 in three-point field-goal percentage; he was named to the All-NBA Second Team. In addition, Mason averaged 16.2 points, 11.4 rebounds and 5.7 assists per game, and was named to the All-NBA Third Team, and to the NBA All-Defensive Second Team, while sixth man Dell Curry contributed 14.8 points per game and 126 three-point field goals off the bench, and Divac provided the team with 12.6 points, 9.0 rebounds, 3.7 assists, 1.3 steals and 2.2 blocks per game. Meanwhile, Pierce contributed 12.0 points per game in 27 games after the trade, Matt Geiger averaged 8.9 points and 5.3 rebounds per game, but only played just 49 games due to a back injury, Muggsy Bogues provided with 8.0 points, 7.2 assists and 1.3 steals per game, Delk contributed 5.4 points per game, and Smith averaged 5.0 points per game.

During the NBA All-Star weekend at the Gund Arena in Cleveland, Ohio, Rice was selected for the 1997 NBA All-Star Game, as a member of the Eastern Conference All-Star team. Rice scored 26 points, and made 4 out of 7 three-point field-goal attempts off the bench, and was named the NBA All-Star Game Most Valuable Player, as the Eastern Conference defeated the Western Conference, 132–120. In addition, Rice also participated in the NBA Three-Point Shootout for the third consecutive year. Rice finished in fifth place in Most Valuable Player voting, while Mason finished tied in ninth place; Rice also finished tied in fifth place in Most Improved Player voting, while Curry finished tied in fifth place in Sixth Man of the Year voting, and Cowens finished in second place in Coach of the Year voting, behind Pat Riley of the Miami Heat.

The Hornets led the NBA in home-game attendance for the eighth, and final time during their history in Charlotte, with an attendance of 985,722 at the Charlotte Coliseum during the regular season; the team also finished with the best three-point field-goal percentage in NBA history, shooting .428 from beyond the arch.

=== NBA playoffs ===
In the Eastern Conference First Round of the 1997 NBA playoffs, the Hornets faced off against the 3rd–seeded New York Knicks, who were led by All-Star center Patrick Ewing, Allan Houston, and Sixth Man of the Year, John Starks. The Hornets lost the first two games to the Knicks on the road at Madison Square Garden, before losing Game 3 at home, 104–95 at the Charlotte Coliseum, thus losing the series in a three-game sweep.

=== Aftermath ===
Following the season, Pierce re-signed as a free agent with his former team, the Milwaukee Bucks during the next season, and Smith and Royal were both released to free agency.

== NBA draft ==
Round	Pick	Player	Position	Nationality	School
1	13	Kobe Bryant	SG	United States	Lower Merion HS
1	16	Tony Delk	SG/PG	United States	Kentucky
2	44	Malik Rose	PF	United States	Drexel

The Hornets entered the draft with two first-round picks and one second-round pick. The 16th pick was acquired from the Miami Heat via trade in 1995.

In the 1996 NBA draft, the Hornets selected Kobe Bryant with the 13th overall pick. Before he was chosen by the Hornets, the 17-year-old Bryant had made a lasting impression on then-Lakers general manager Jerry West, who immediately foresaw potential in Bryant's basketball ability during pre-draft workouts. West even went on to state that Bryant's workouts were some of the bests he had seen. Immediately after the draft, Dave Cowens expressed that the Hornets had no use for him. Fifteen days later, West traded his starting center, Vlade Divac to the Hornets for the young Kobe Bryant. However, this ultimately proved brilliant, as Bryant went on to win 5 NBA championships with the Lakers, while the Hornets have yet to win one.

== Roster ==
1996–97 Charlotte Hornets roster
Players

Pos.	No.	Player	Height	Weight	DOB	From
F	7	Rafael Addison	6 ft 7 in (2.01 m)	215 lb (98 kg)	1964–07–22	Syracuse
G	1	Muggsy Bogues	5 ft 3 in (1.60 m)	136 lb (62 kg)	1965–01–09	Wake Forest
G	30	Dell Curry	6 ft 4 in (1.93 m)	190 lb (86 kg)	1964–06–25	Virginia Tech
G	00	Tony Delk	6 ft 1 in (1.85 m)	189 lb (86 kg)	1974–01–28	Kentucky
C	12	Vlade Divac	7 ft 1 in (2.16 m)	243 lb (110 kg)	1968–02–03	Yugoslavia
C	52	Matt Geiger	7 ft 0 in (2.13 m)	243 lb (110 kg)	1969–09–10	Georgia Tech
F	14	Anthony Mason	6 ft 7 in (2.01 m)	250 lb (113 kg)	1966–12–14	Tennessee State
G	21	Ricky Pierce	6 ft 4 in (1.93 m)	205 lb (93 kg)	1959–08–19	Rice
F	41	Glen Rice	6 ft 7 in (2.01 m)	215 lb (98 kg)	1967–05–28	Michigan
F	31	Malik Rose	6 ft 7 in (2.01 m)	250 lb (113 kg)	1974–11–23	Drexel
F	5	Donald Royal	6 ft 8 in (2.03 m)	210 lb (95 kg)	1966–05–22	Notre Dame
G	34	Tony Smith	6 ft 3 in (1.91 m)	185 lb (84 kg)	1968–06–14	Marquette

Coaches
Head coach
- Dave Cowens
Assistant(s)
- T. R. Dunn
- Lee Rose

Legend
- (DP) Unsigned draft pick
- (FA) Free agent
- (S) Suspended
- Injured

Roster
Updated: February 20, 1997

=== Roster notes ===
- Power forward Tom Chambers was waived on April 8, 1997.

== Regular season ==
=== Season standings ===
Central Division	W	L	PCT	GB	Home	Road	Div
y-Chicago Bulls	69	13	.841	–	39–2	30–11	24–4
x-Atlanta Hawks	56	26	.683	13	36–5	20–21	17–11
x-Detroit Pistons	54	28	.659	15	30–11	24–17	17–11
x-Charlotte Hornets	54	28	.659	15	30–11	24–17	14–14
Cleveland Cavaliers	42	40	.512	27	25–16	17–24	13–15
Indiana Pacers	39	43	.476	30	21–20	18–23	11–17
Milwaukee Bucks	33	49	.402	36	20–21	13–28	10–18
Toronto Raptors	30	52	.366	39	18–23	12–29	6–22

1996–97 NBA East standings
#	Eastern Conference				
#	Team	W	L	PCT	GB
1	z-Chicago Bulls	69	13	.841	–
2	y-Miami Heat	61	21	.744	8
3	x-New York Knicks	57	25	.695	12
4	x-Atlanta Hawks	56	26	.683	13
5	x-Detroit Pistons	54	28	.659	15
6	x-Charlotte Hornets	54	28	.659	15
7	x-Orlando Magic	45	37	.549	24
8	x-Washington Bullets	44	38	.537	25
9	Cleveland Cavaliers	42	40	.512	27
10	Indiana Pacers	39	43	.476	30
11	Milwaukee Bucks	33	49	.402	36
12	Toronto Raptors	30	52	.366	39
13	New Jersey Nets	26	56	.317	43
14	Philadelphia 76ers	22	60	.268	47
15	Boston Celtics	15	67	.183	54

== Game log ==
=== Regular season ===
1996–97 game log
Total: 54–28 (home: 30–11; road: 24–17)
November: 8–6 (home: 5–2; road: 3–4)

Game	Date	Team	Score	High points	High rebounds	High assists	Location Attendance	Record
1	November 2, 1996	Toronto	W 109–98				Charlotte Coliseum	1–0
2	November 3, 1996	@ New York	L 86–113				Madison Square Garden	1–1
3	November 6, 1996	L.A. Lakers	W 88–78				Charlotte Coliseum	2–1
4	November 8, 1996	@ Washington	W 102–87				US Airways Arena	3–1
5	November 9, 1996	Milwaukee	L 98–100				Charlotte Coliseum	3–2
6	November 12, 1996	@ Miami	L 72–93				Miami Arena	3–3
7	November 14, 1996	@ Orlando	L 89–96				Orlando Arena	3–4
8	November 15, 1996	Chicago	L 87–110				Charlotte Coliseum	3–5
9	November 20, 1996	New York	W 93–86				Charlotte Coliseum	4–5
10	November 21, 1996	@ Indiana	W 90–87				Market Square Arena	5–5
11	November 23, 1996	Detroit	W 93–85				Charlotte Coliseum	6–5
12	November 26, 1996	Seattle	W 97–89				Charlotte Coliseum	7–5
13	November 27, 1996	@ Toronto	L 88–92				SkyDome	7–6
14	November 30, 1996	@ Milwaukee	W 94–87				Bradley Center	8–6

December: 8–7 (home: 3–2; road: 5–5)

Game	Date	Team	Score	High points	High rebounds	High assists	Location Attendance	Record
15	December 2, 1996	@ Utah	L 97–107				Delta Center	8–7
16	December 3, 1996	@ L.A. Clippers	L 89–96				Los Angeles Memorial Sports Arena	8–8
17	December 6, 1996	@ Portland	L 93–97				Rose Garden Arena	8–9
18	December 7, 1996	@ Seattle	W 94–92				KeyArena	9–9
19	December 9, 1996	@ Vancouver	W 107–91				General Motors Place	10–9
20	December 11, 1996	Denver	W 101–97				Charlotte Coliseum	11–9
21	December 13, 1996	Philadelphia	W 84–75				Charlotte Coliseum	12–9
22	December 14, 1996	@ Chicago	L 82–87				United Center	12–10
23	December 17, 1996	@ Philadelphia	W 93–84				CoreStates Center	13–10
24	December 19, 1996	Chicago	L 72–93				Charlotte Coliseum	13–11
25	December 21, 1996	Atlanta	W 98–93				Charlotte Coliseum	14–11
26	December 22, 1996	@ Boston	W 102–98				FleetCenter	15–11
27	December 27, 1996	Miami	L 86–101				Charlotte Coliseum	15–12
28	December 28, 1996	@ Detroit	L 75–97				The Palace of Auburn Hills	15–13
29	December 30, 1996	@ Washington	W 101–92				US Airways Arena	16–13

January: 10–6 (home: 5–2; road: 5–4)

Game	Date	Team	Score	High points	High rebounds	High assists	Location Attendance	Record
30	January 2, 1997	Dallas	W 107–97				Charlotte Coliseum	17–13
31	January 4, 1997	Washington	L 93–104				Charlotte Coliseum	17–14
32	January 6, 1997	@ Golden State	W 109–101				San Jose Arena	18–14
33	January 8, 1997	@ L.A. Lakers	L 97–101				Great Western Forum	18–15
34	January 10, 1997	@ Phoenix	L 90–102				America West Arena	18–16
35	January 12, 1997	@ Sacramento	W 97–93				ARCO Arena	19–16
36	January 13, 1997	@ Denver	W 102–100 (OT)				McNichols Sports Arena	20–16
37	January 15, 1997	New Jersey	W 116–104				Charlotte Coliseum	21–16
38	January 18, 1997	@ New Jersey	W 102–92				Continental Airlines Arena	22–16
39	January 20, 1997	@ Atlanta	L 97–106				The Omni	22–17
40	January 21, 1997	Houston	W 114–108				Charlotte Coliseum	23–17
41	January 24, 1997	New York	W 113–104 (OT)				Charlotte Coliseum	24–17
42	January 25, 1997	@ Cleveland	L 73–106				Gund Arena	24–18
43	January 28, 1997	@ Indiana	W 98–97				Market Square Arena	25–18
44	January 29, 1997	Indiana	L 95–106				Charlotte Coliseum	25–19
45	January 31, 1997	Milwaukee	W 102–95				Charlotte Coliseum	26–19

February: 10–3 (home: 6–1; road: 4–2)

Game	Date	Team	Score	High points	High rebounds	High assists	Location Attendance	Record
46	February 2, 1997	@ New York	W 99–93				Madison Square Garden	27–19
47	February 4, 1997	Minnesota	W 115–101				Charlotte Coliseum	28–19
48	February 6, 1997	Sacramento	W 115–100				Charlotte Coliseum	29–19
All-Star Break
49	February 11, 1997	@ Chicago	L 100–103				United Center	29–20
50	February 12, 1997	New Jersey	W 113–100				Charlotte Coliseum	30–20
51	February 14, 1997	Detroit	L 103–109				Charlotte Coliseum	30–21
52	February 17, 1997	Orlando	W 124–110				Charlotte Coliseum	31–21
53	February 19, 1997	Phoenix	W 123–115				Charlotte Coliseum	32–21
54	February 21, 1997	L.A. Clippers	W 114–96				Charlotte Coliseum	33–21
55	February 22, 1997	@ Atlanta	W 93–92				The Omni	34–21
56	February 24, 1997	@ San Antonio	W 96–84				Alamodome	35–21
57	February 25, 1997	@ Dallas	L 84–86				Reunion Arena	35–22
58	February 27, 1997	@ Houston	W 106–95				The Summit	36–22

March: 9–4 (home: 6–3; road: 3–1)

Game	Date	Team	Score	High points	High rebounds	High assists	Location Attendance	Record
59	March 2, 1997	@ Minnesota	W 108–96				Target Center	37–22
60	March 4, 1997	San Antonio	W 105–98				Charlotte Coliseum	38–22
61	March 6, 1997	Boston	W 122–121 (OT)				Charlotte Coliseum	39–22
62	March 9, 1997	Miami	W 82–76				Charlotte Coliseum	40–22
63	March 11, 1997	Vancouver	W 98–92				Charlotte Coliseum	41–22
64	March 14, 1997	@ Orlando	L 81–86				Orlando Arena	41–23
65	March 15, 1997	@ Philadelphia	W 107–99				CoreStates Center	42–23
66	March 17, 1997	Utah	L 93–114				Charlotte Coliseum	42–24
67	March 19, 1997	Cleveland	W 90–72				Charlotte Coliseum	43–24
68	March 21, 1997	@ Toronto	W 102–97				SkyDome	44–24
69	March 22, 1997	Golden State	W 100–93 (OT)				Charlotte Coliseum	45–24
70	March 26, 1997	Portland	L 87–88				Charlotte Coliseum	45–25
71	March 28, 1997	Indiana	L 115–116				Charlotte Coliseum	45–26

April: 9–2 (home: 5–1; road: 4–1)

Game	Date	Team	Score	High points	High rebounds	High assists	Location Attendance	Record
72	April 2, 1997	Atlanta	W 95–84				Charlotte Coliseum	46–26
73	April 3, 1997	@ New Jersey	W 93–87				Continental Airlines Arena	47–26
74	April 5, 1997	Philadelphia	W 115–113				Charlotte Coliseum	48–26
75	April 7, 1997	@ Cleveland	W 110–105 (OT)				Gund Arena	49–26
76	April 9, 1997	Boston	W 136–111				Charlotte Coliseum	50–26
77	April 11, 1997	@ Detroit	W 93–85				The Palace of Auburn Hills	51–26
78	April 12, 1997	Washington	W 99–97				Charlotte Coliseum	52–26
79	April 14, 1997	Cleveland	W 94–82				Charlotte Coliseum	53–26
80	April 16, 1997	@ Boston	W 108–102				FleetCenter	54–26
81	April 18, 1997	Toronto	L 100–108				Charlotte Coliseum	54–27
82	April 20, 1997	@ Milwaukee	L 100–120				Bradley Center	54–28

1996–97 schedule

== Playoffs ==
1997 playoff game log
First Round: 0–3 (home: 0–1; road: 0–2)

Game	Date	Team	Score	High points	High rebounds	High assists	Location Attendance	Series
1	April 24, 1997	@ New York	L 99–109	Vlade Divac (27)	Anthony Mason (13)	Anthony Mason (5)	Madison Square Garden; 19,763	0–1
2	April 26, 1997	@ New York	L 93–100	Glen Rice (39)	Divac, Mason (12)	four players tied (2)	Madison Square Garden; 19,763	0–2
3	April 28, 1997	New York	L 95–104	Glen Rice (22)	Anthony Mason (11)	Glen Rice (9)	Charlotte Coliseum; 24,042	0–3

1997 schedule

== Player statistics ==
=== Ragular season ===
Player	POS	GP	GS	MP	REB	AST	STL	BLK	PTS	MPG	RPG	APG	SPG	BPG	PPG
Vlade Divac	C	81	80	2,840	725	301	103	180	1,024	35.1	9.0	3.7	1.3	2.2	12.6
Glen Rice	SF	79	78	3,362	318	160	72	26	2,115	42.6	4.0	2.0	.9	.3	26.8
Anthony Mason	PF	73	73	3,143	829	414	76	33	1,186	43.1	11.4	5.7	1.0	.5	16.2
Tony Smith	PG	69	39	1,291	94	150	48	19	346	18.7	1.4	2.2	.7	.3	5.0
Dell Curry	SG	68	20	2,078	211	118	60	14	1,008	30.6	3.1	1.7	.9	.2	14.8
Muggsy Bogues	PG	65	65	1,880	141	469	82	2	522	28.9	2.2	7.2	1.3	.0	8.0
Tony Delk	PG	61	1	867	99	99	36	6	332	14.2	1.6	1.6	.6	.1	5.4
Malik Rose	PF	54	1	525	164	32	28	17	160	9.7	3.0	.6	.5	.3	3.0
Matt Geiger	C	49	13	1,044	258	38	20	27	437	21.3	5.3	.8	.4	.6	8.9
Rafael Addison	SF	41	3	355	45	34	8	3	128	8.7	1.1	.8	.2	.1	3.1
George Zidek^{†}	C	36	2	288	63	9	4	3	91	8.0	1.8	.3	.1	.1	2.5
Anthony Goldwire^{†}	PG	33	9	576	38	94	19	1	190	17.5	1.2	2.8	.6	.0	5.8
Scott Burrell^{†}	SF	28	2	482	79	39	14	11	151	17.2	2.8	1.4	.5	.4	5.4
Ricky Pierce^{†}	SG	27	17	650	68	49	14	4	324	24.1	2.5	1.8	.5	.1	12.0
Donald Royal^{†}	SF	25	2	320	58	10	12	2	70	12.8	2.3	.4	.5	.1	2.8
Tom Chambers	PF	12	5	83	14	4	1	0	19	6.9	1.2	.3	.1	.0	1.6
Jamie Feick^{†}	C	3	0	10	3	0	0	1	5	3.3	1.0	.0	.0	.3	1.7
Eric Leckner^{†}	C	1	0	11	1	1	0	0	0	11.0	1.0	1.0	.0	.0	.0

- ^{†} Denotes player spent time with another team in the season. Stats reflect time with the Hornets only.

=== Playoffs ===
Player	POS	GP	GS	MP	REB	AST	STL	BLK	PTS	MPG	RPG	APG	SPG	BPG	PPG
Glen Rice	SF	3	3	137	11	11	4	1	83	45.7	3.7	3.7	1.3	.3	27.7
Anthony Mason	PF	3	3	131	36	9	1	1	39	43.7	12.0	3.0	.3	.3	13.0
Vlade Divac	C	3	3	116	26	10	3	6	54	38.7	8.7	3.3	1.0	2.0	18.0
Ricky Pierce	SG	3	2	87	8	4	2	0	23	29.0	2.7	1.3	.7	.0	7.7
Tony Delk	PG	3	1	85	10	6	2	0	31	28.3	3.3	2.0	.7	.0	10.3
Dell Curry	SG	3	1	50	1	5	4	0	14	16.7	.3	1.7	1.3	.0	4.7
Matt Geiger	C	3	0	31	8	2	2	1	6	10.3	2.7	.7	.7	.3	2.0
Muggsy Bogues	PG	2	2	58	3	5	1	0	32	29.0	1.5	2.5	.5	.0	16.0
Malik Rose	PF	2	0	12	5	1	0	0	4	6.0	2.5	.5	.0	.0	2.0
Tony Smith	PG	2	0	9	1	2	1	0	1	4.5	.5	1.0	.5	.0	.5
Donald Royal	SF	1	0	4	2	0	0	0	0	4.0	2.0	.0	.0	.0	.0

== Awards and records ==
- Glen Rice, NBA All-Star Game Most Valuable Player Award
- Bob Bass, NBA Executive of the Year Award
- Glen Rice, All-NBA Second Team
- Anthony Mason, All-NBA Third Team
- Anthony Mason, NBA All-Defensive Second Team

== Transactions ==
- July 11, 1996

Released Michael Adams.

Traded Kobe Bryant to the Los Angeles Lakers for Vlade Divac.

Released Robert Parish.

- July 14, 1996

Traded Larry Johnson to the New York Knicks for Brad Lohaus and Anthony Mason.

- October 3, 1996

Signed Bob McCann as a free agent.

October 19, 1996

Signed Tony Smith as a free agent.

- October 31, 1996

Waived Brad Lohaus.

- January 6, 1997

Signed Jamie Feick to the first of two 10-day contracts.

- January 28, 1997

Signed Eric Leckner to a 10-day contract.

- January 30, 1997

Signed Tom Chambers to a contract for the rest of the season.

- February 20, 1997

Traded Scott Burrell to the Golden State Warriors for Donald Royal.

Traded Anthony Goldwire and George Zidek to the Denver Nuggets for Ricky Pierce.

- April 8, 1997

Waived Tom Chambers.

Player transactions citation:
