= 1996–97 Chicago Bulls season =

NBA basketball team season (won championship)

- NBA champions
- Conference champions
- Division champions
- Head coach: Phil Jackson
- General manager: Jerry Krause
- Owners: Jerry Reinsdorf
- Arena: United Center

Results
- Record: 69–13 (.841)
- Place: Division: 1st (Central); Conference: 1st (Eastern)
- Playoff finish: NBA champions (Defeated Jazz 4–2)
- Stats at Basketball Reference

Local media
- Television: WGN-TV; SportsChannel Chicago
- Radio: WMVP

The 1996–97 Chicago Bulls season was the 31st season for the Chicago Bulls in the National Basketball Association. The Bulls entered the regular season as defending NBA champions, having defeated the Seattle SuperSonics in the 1996 NBA Finals in six games, winning their fourth NBA championship. They repeated their Championship, defeating the Utah Jazz in six games.

== Season summary ==
=== Off-season ===
During the off-season, the Bulls signed 43-year old free agent All-Star center Robert Parish, who won three championships with the Boston Celtics in the 1980s. Coming off of one of the greatest seasons in NBA history, the Bulls, on the backs of recording another first-place finish in their division and conference, repeated as NBA champions. The Bulls were led by Michael Jordan, perennial All-Star small forward Scottie Pippen, and rebound ace Dennis Rodman; other notable players on the club's roster that year were clutch-specialist Croatian Toni Kukoč, and sharp-shooting point guard Steve Kerr.

=== Regular season ===
The Bulls got off to a fast start by winning their first twelve games of the regular season. The team posted an eight-game winning streak in December, and then posted a nine-game winning streak between December and January, which led to a 34–4 start to the season. The Bulls posted another eight-game winning streak between January and February, and held a 42–6 record at the All-Star break. The team posted a seven-game winning streak in February, and later on posted another eight-game winning streak between March and April. In April, the Bulls signed free agent Brian Williams, who previously played for the Los Angeles Clippers last season, and spent most of the 1996–97 season as a free agent; Williams played in the final nine games of the regular season as a backup center for the Bulls.

With a 69–12 record, the Bulls looked to make history against the New York Knicks in their final game of the regular season, at home at the United Center on April 19, 1997. However, Pippen missed a game-winning three-pointer at the buzzer, as the Bulls lost to the Knicks, 103–101. The Bulls finished in first place in the Central Division with a 69–13 record, just missing out on becoming the first team in NBA history to have back-to-back 70 wins seasons; the team also posted a 39–2 home record at the United Center. The Bulls earned the first seed in the Eastern Conference, qualified for the NBA playoffs for the 13th consecutive year, and had the fourth best team defensive rating in the NBA.

Jordan led the league in scoring once again, averaging 29.6 points, 5.9 rebounds, 4.3 assists and 1.7 steals per game, plus contributing 111 three-point field goals, and was named to the All-NBA First Team, while Pippen averaged 20.2 points, 6.5 rebounds, 5.7 assists and 1.9 steals per game, led the Bulls with 156 three-point field goals, and was named to the All-NBA Second Team; both Jordan and Pippen were named to the NBA All-Defensive First Team. In addition, Kukoč provided scoring off the bench, averaging 13.2 points, 4.6 rebounds and 4.5 assists per game, but only played 57 games due to a foot injury, while Luc Longley provided the team with 9.1 points and 5.6 rebounds per game, and Kerr contributed 8.1 points per game and 110 three-point field goals off the bench, while shooting .464 in three-point field goal percentage. Meanwhile, second-year forward Jason Caffey averaged 7.3 points and 4.0 rebounds per game, Ron Harper contributed 6.3 points and 2.5 assists per game, Rodman provided with 5.7 points and 16.1 rebounds per game, but only played 55 games due to suspensions and a knee injury, which caused him to miss the final 13 games of the regular season, and Randy Brown contributed 4.7 points per game.

During the NBA All-Star weekend at the Gund Arena in Cleveland, Ohio, Jordan and Pippen were both selected for the 1997 NBA All-Star Game, as members of the Eastern Conference All-Star team; it was Pippen's seventh and final All-Star appearance. Jordan recorded the first triple-double in an All-Star Game with 14 points, 11 rebounds and 11 assists, as the Eastern Conference defeated the Western Conference, 132–120. Meanwhile, Kerr won the NBA Three-Point Shootout, in which he participated in for the fourth consecutive year. Jordan also finished in second place in Most Valuable Player voting, behind Karl Malone of the Utah Jazz, while Pippen finished in eleventh place; Pippen finished in fourth place in Defensive Player of the Year voting, while Jordan finished in fifth place, and Kukoč finished in second place in Sixth Man of the Year voting, behind John Starks of the Knicks.

The Bulls finished second in the NBA in home-game attendance behind the Charlotte Hornets, with an attendance of 978,457 at the United Center during the regular season.

=== NBA playoffs ===
In the Eastern Conference First Round of the 1997 NBA playoffs, the Bulls faced off against the 8th–seeded Washington Bullets, a team that featured the trio of All-Star forward Chris Webber, Juwan Howard and Rod Strickland. In their first two home games at the United Center, the Bulls won Game 1 over the Bullets, 98–86, despite shooting .380 in field-goal percentage, and then won Game 2 by a score of 109–104, in which Jordan scored 55 points. In Game 3 at US Airways Arena, and despite trailing 14–2 early in the first quarter, the Bulls defeated the Bullets, 96–95 to win the series in a three-game sweep.

In the Eastern Conference Semi-finals, the team faced off against the 4th–seeded Atlanta Hawks, who were led by the quartet of All-Star center, and Defensive Player of the Year, Dikembe Mutombo, All-Star forward Christian Laettner, Steve Smith and Mookie Blaylock. The Bulls won Game 1 over the Hawks at the United Center, 100–97, but then lost Game 2 at home, 103–95 as the Hawks evened the series. The Bulls managed to win the next two games on the road at the Omni Coliseum, before winning Game 5 over the Hawks at the United Center, 107–92 to win the series in five games.

In the Eastern Conference Finals, the Bulls then faced off against the 2nd–seeded, and Atlantic Division champion Miami Heat, who were led by All-Star guard Tim Hardaway, All-Star center Alonzo Mourning, and Jamal Mashburn. The Bulls took a 3–0 series lead before losing Game 4 to the Heat on the road, 87–80 at the Miami Arena. The Bulls won Game 5 over the Heat at the United Center, 100–87 to win the series in five games, and advance to the NBA Finals for the second consecutive year.

In the 1997 NBA Finals, the Bulls faced off against the top–seeded Jazz, who were led by the trio of Malone, All-Star guard John Stockton, and Jeff Hornacek. The Bulls won the first two games over the Jazz at the United Center, but then lost the next two games on the road, as the Jazz evened the series. In Game 5 at the Delta Center, which was known as "The Flu Game", Jordan scored 38 points in 44 minutes, as the Bulls defeated the Jazz, 90–88 to take a 3–2 series lead. The Bulls won Game 6 over the Jazz at the United Center, 90–86 to win the series in six games for their second consecutive NBA championship, and their fifth championship in seven years; Jordan was named the NBA Finals Most Valuable Player for the second straight year, and for the fifth time overall.

=== Notable incidents ===
One notable incident of the regular season occurred on January 15, 1997, during a road game against the Minnesota Timberwolves at the Target Center. Rodman tripped and fell while trying to grab a rebound, and then kicked cameraman Eugene Amos in the groin; Amos had to be put on a stretcher and was rushed to a local hospital, as Rodman was suspended for eleven games. The Bulls defeated the Timberwolves by a score of 112–102.

=== Aftermath ===
Following the season, Parish retired after 21 seasons in the NBA, while Williams signed as a free agent with the Detroit Pistons, and Dickey Simpkins was traded to the Golden State Warriors.

== Offseason ==
=== NBA draft ===
Round	Pick	Player	Position	Nationality	School/Club team
1	29	Travis Knight	C	United States	UConn

== Roster ==
1996–97 Chicago Bulls roster
Players

Pos.	No.	Player	Height	Weight	DOB	From
G	1	Randy Brown	6 ft 2 in (1.88 m)	190 lb (86 kg)	1968–05–22	New Mexico State
F	30	Jud Buechler	6 ft 6 in (1.98 m)	220 lb (100 kg)	1968–06–19	Arizona
F	35	Jason Caffey	6 ft 8 in (2.03 m)	255 lb (116 kg)	1973–06–12	Alabama
G	9	Ron Harper	6 ft 6 in (1.98 m)	185 lb (84 kg)	1964–01–20	Miami (OH)
G	23	Michael Jordan	6 ft 6 in (1.98 m)	215 lb (98 kg)	1963–02–17	North Carolina
G	25	Steve Kerr	6 ft 3 in (1.91 m)	175 lb (79 kg)	1965–09–27	Arizona
F	7	Toni Kukoč	6 ft 10 in (2.08 m)	192 lb (87 kg)	1968–09–18	Croatia
C	13	Luc Longley	7 ft 2 in (2.18 m)	265 lb (120 kg)	1969–01–19	New Mexico
C	00	Robert Parish	7 ft 0 in (2.13 m)	235 lb (107 kg)	1953–08–30	Centenary
F	33	Scottie Pippen	6 ft 7 in (2.01 m)	220 lb (100 kg)	1965–09–25	Central Arkansas
F	91	Dennis Rodman	6 ft 8 in (2.03 m)	210 lb (95 kg)	1961–05–13	SE Oklahoma State
F	8	Dickey Simpkins	6 ft 9 in (2.06 m)	248 lb (112 kg)	1972–04–06	Providence
F	6	Matt Steigenga	6 ft 7 in (2.01 m)	225 lb (102 kg)	1970–03–27	Michigan State
C	34	Bill Wennington (injured)	7 ft 0 in (2.13 m)	245 lb (111 kg)	1963–04–26	St. John's
C	18	Brian Williams	6 ft 11 in (2.11 m)	260 lb (118 kg)	1969–04–06	Arizona

Coaches
Head coach
- Phil Jackson
Assistant(s)
- Bill Cartwright
- Frank Hamblen
- Jimmy Rodgers
- Tex Winter

Legend
- (DP) Unsigned draft pick
- (FA) Free agent
- (S) Suspended
- Injured

Roster
Updated: April 12, 1997

== Regular season ==
=== Season standings ===
Central Division	W	L	PCT	GB	Home	Road	Div
y-Chicago Bulls	69	13	.841	–	39–2	30–11	24–4
x-Atlanta Hawks	56	26	.683	13	36–5	20–21	17–11
x-Detroit Pistons	54	28	.659	15	30–11	24–17	17–11
x-Charlotte Hornets	54	28	.659	15	30–11	24–17	14–14
Cleveland Cavaliers	42	40	.512	27	25–16	17–24	13–15
Indiana Pacers	39	43	.476	30	21–20	18–23	11–17
Milwaukee Bucks	33	49	.402	36	20–21	13–28	10–18
Toronto Raptors	30	52	.366	39	18–23	12–29	6–22

1996–97 NBA East standings
#	Eastern Conference				
#	Team	W	L	PCT	GB
1	z-Chicago Bulls	69	13	.841	–
2	y-Miami Heat	61	21	.744	8
3	x-New York Knicks	57	25	.695	12
4	x-Atlanta Hawks	56	26	.683	13
5	x-Detroit Pistons	54	28	.659	15
6	x-Charlotte Hornets	54	28	.659	15
7	x-Orlando Magic	45	37	.549	24
8	x-Washington Bullets	44	38	.537	25
9	Cleveland Cavaliers	42	40	.512	27
10	Indiana Pacers	39	43	.476	30
11	Milwaukee Bucks	33	49	.402	36
12	Toronto Raptors	30	52	.366	39
13	New Jersey Nets	26	56	.317	43
14	Philadelphia 76ers	22	60	.268	47
15	Boston Celtics	15	67	.183	54

== Game log ==
=== Regular season ===
1996–97 game log
Total: 69–13 (Home: 39–2; Road: 30–11)
November: 15–1 (home: 6–0; road: 9–1)

Game	Date	Team	Score	High points	High rebounds	High assists	Location Attendance	Record
1	November 1	@ Boston	W 107–98	Michael Jordan (30)	Dennis Rodman (13)	Toni Kukoč (7)	FleetCenter; 18,624	1–0
2	November 2	Philadelphia	W 115–86	Michael Jordan (27)	Dennis Rodman (12)	Scottie Pippen (9)	United Center; 24,040	2–0
3	November 5	Vancouver	W 96–73	Michael Jordan (22)	Dennis Rodman (19)	Scottie Pippen (8)	United Center; 23,726	3–0
4	November 6	@ Miami	W 106–100	Michael Jordan (50)	Dennis Rodman (22)	Scottie Pippen (5)	Miami Arena; 15,200	4–0
5	November 8	@ Detroit	W 98–80	3 players tied (16)	Dennis Rodman (20)	Michael Jordan (8)	The Palace of Auburn Hills; 21,454	5–0
6	November 9	Boston	W 104–92	Michael Jordan (27)	Scottie Pippen (12)	Scottie Pippen (11)	United Center; 23,813	6–0
7	November 11	Phoenix	W 97–79	Michael Jordan (26)	Dennis Rodman (22)	Scottie Pippen (7)	United Center; 23,807	7–0
8	November 13	Miami	W 103–71	Michael Jordan (28)	Dennis Rodman (19)	Brown & Kukoč (4)	United Center; 23,889	8–0
9	November 15	@ Charlotte	W 110–87	Michael Jordan (38)	Dennis Rodman (17)	Scottie Pippen (7)	Charlotte Coliseum; 24,042	9–0
10	November 16	Atlanta	W 97–69	Michael Jordan (25)	Dennis Rodman (15)	Scottie Pippen (7)	United Center; 23,939	10–0
11	November 20	@ Phoenix	W 113–99	Jordan & Pippen (37)	Dennis Rodman (16)	Scottie Pippen (7)	America West Arena; 19,023	11–0
12	November 21	@ Denver	W 110–92	Michael Jordan (31)	3 players tied (7)	Pippen & Rodman (5)	McNichols Sports Arena; 17,171	12–0
13	November 23	@ Utah	L 100–105	Michael Jordan (44)	Dennis Rodman (10)	Michael Jordan (4)	Delta Center; 19,911	12–1
14	November 25	@ L.A. Clippers	W 88–84	Michael Jordan (40)	Dennis Rodman (14)	Kukoč & Pippen (4)	Los Angeles Memorial Sports Arena; 16,144	13–1
15	November 29	@ Dallas	W 116–97	Michael Jordan (36)	Dennis Rodman (19)	Toni Kukoč (6)	Reunion Arena; 18,042	14–1
16	November 30	@ San Antonio	W 97–88	Michael Jordan (35)	Dennis Rodman (14)	Scottie Pippen (8)	Alamodome; 37,058	15–1

December: 12–3 (home: 8–1; road: 4–2)

Game	Date	Team	Score	High points	High rebounds	High assists	Location Attendance	Record
17	December 3	@ Milwaukee	W 107–104	Michael Jordan (40)	Dennis Rodman (12)	Jordan & Pippen (6)	Bradley Center; 18,717	16–1
18	December 5	L.A. Clippers	W 114–96	Scottie Pippen (25)	Dennis Rodman (14)	Toni Kukoč (12)	United Center; 23,687	17–1
19	December 7	Miami	L 80–83	Michael Jordan (37)	Dennis Rodman (18)	Scottie Pippen (5)	United Center; 23,861	17–2
20	December 8	@ Toronto	L 89–97	Scottie Pippen (28)	Dennis Rodman (11)	Michael Jordan (8)	SkyDome; 33,385	17–3
21	December 11	Minnesota	W 103–86	Michael Jordan (27)	Scottie Pippen (9)	Scottie Pippen (8)	United Center; 23,505	18–3
22	December 13	@ New Jersey	W 113–92	Michael Jordan (32)	Bill Wennington (8)	Jordan & Pippen (6)	Continental Airlines Arena; 20,049	19–3
23	December 14	Charlotte	W 87–82	Michael Jordan (29)	Dennis Rodman (23)	Jordan & Pippen (5)	United Center; 23,771	20–3
24	December 17	L.A. Lakers	W 129–123 (OT)	Scottie Pippen (35)	Dennis Rodman (18)	Scottie Pippen (6)	United Center; 23,919	21–3
25	December 19	@ Charlotte	W 93–72	Michael Jordan (35)	Dennis Rodman (14)	Dennis Rodman (5)	Charlotte Coliseum; 24,042	22–3
26	December 21	@ Philadelphia	W 111–105	Michael Jordan (31)	Dennis Rodman (18)	Scottie Pippen (7)	CoreStates Center; 20,918	23–3
27	December 23	New Jersey	W 113–81	Michael Jordan (24)	Dennis Rodman (17)	Toni Kukoč (5)	United Center; 23,601	24–3
28	December 25	Detroit	W 95–83	Scottie Pippen (27)	Dennis Rodman (22)	Kukoč & Pippen (8)	United Center; 23,744	25–3
29	December 26	@ Atlanta	L 103–108	Michael Jordan (34)	Parish & Rodman (10)	Ron Harper (4)	Omni Coliseum; 16,378	25–4
30	December 28	Cleveland	W 102–97	Michael Jordan (45)	Dennis Rodman (16)	Scottie Pippen (6)	United Center; 23,792	26–4
31	December 30	Indiana	W 81–79	Michael Jordan (28)	Dennis Rodman (21)	Scottie Pippen (5)	United Center; 23,692	27–4

January: 13–1 (home: 7–0; road: 6–1)

Game	Date	Team	Score	High points	High rebounds	High assists	Location Attendance	Record
32	January 3	Orlando	W 110–89	Michael Jordan (22)	Dennis Rodman (22)	Ron Harper (7)	United Center; 23,904	28–4
33	January 6	Utah	W 102–89	Scottie Pippen (24)	Dennis Rodman (16)	Toni Kukoč (6)	United Center; 23,904	29–4
34	January 10	@ Milwaukee	W 116–101	Michael Jordan (33)	Dennis Rodman (26)	3 players tied (5)	Bradley Center; 18,717	30–4
35	January 11	Houston	W 110–86	Michael Jordan (32)	Dennis Rodman (18)	Jordan & Pippen (7)	United Center; 24,196	31–4
36	January 14	Washington	W 108–107	Michael Jordan (39)	Dennis Rodman (18)	Scottie Pippen (8)	United Center; 23,891	32–4
37	January 15	@ Minnesota	W 112–102	Scottie Pippen (29)	Dennis Rodman (15)	Toni Kukoč (7)	Target Center; 20,113	33–4
38	January 17	Milwaukee	W 100–73	Jordan & Kukoč (24)	Luc Longley (8)	Michael Jordan (11)	United Center; 23,898	34–4
39	January 19	@ Houston	L 86–102	Michael Jordan (26)	Michael Jordan (14)	Scottie Pippen (7)	The Summit; 16,285	34–5
40	January 21	New York	W 88–87	Michael Jordan (51)	Scottie Pippen (10)	Scottie Pippen (9)	United Center; 23,902	35–5
41	January 23	@ Cleveland	W 87–71	Michael Jordan (32)	Scottie Pippen (12)	Scottie Pippen (8)	Gund Arena; 20,562	36–5
42	January 25	Toronto	W 110–98	Michael Jordan (24)	Jason Caffey (6)	Toni Kukoč (13)	United Center; 23,913	37–5
43	January 28	@ Vancouver	W 111–96	Michael Jordan (28)	Scottie Pippen (10)	Toni Kukoč (11)	General Motors Place; 19,193	38–5
44	January 30	@ Sacramento	W 111–93	Michael Jordan (32)	Luc Longley (11)	Kukoč & Pippen (6)	ARCO Arena; 17,317	39–5
45	January 31	@ Golden State	W 115–92	Scottie Pippen (32)	Scottie Pippen (10)	Michael Jordan (8)	San Jose Arena; 18,748	40–5

February: 10–2 (home: 6–0; road: 4–2)

Game	Date	Team	Score	High points	High rebounds	High assists	Location Attendance	Record
46	February 2	@ Seattle	W 91–84	Michael Jordan (45)	Michael Jordan (7)	Toni Kukoč (9)	KeyArena; 17,072	41–5
47	February 4	@ Portland	W 88–84	Michael Jordan (36)	Scottie Pippen (8)	Toni Kukoč (5)	Rose Garden; 21,538	42–5
48	February 5	@ L.A. Lakers	L 90–106	Michael Jordan (27)	Toni Kukoč (6)	Scottie Pippen (9)	Great Western Forum; 17,505	42–6
All-Star Break
49	February 11	Charlotte	W 103–100	Michael Jordan (43)	Dennis Rodman (14)	Scottie Pippen (7)	United Center; 23,884	43–6
50	February 14	@ Atlanta	W 89–88	Michael Jordan (30)	Dennis Rodman (12)	Jordan & Pippen (4)	Omni Coliseum; 16,378	44–6
51	February 16	Orlando	W 110–89	Scottie Pippen (22)	Dennis Rodman (13)	Scottie Pippen (11)	United Center; 23,919	45–6
52	February 18	Denver	W 134–123	Scottie Pippen (47)	Dennis Rodman (13)	Michael Jordan (12)	United Center; 23,874	46–6
53	February 21	@ Washington	W 103–99	Michael Jordan (36)	Dennis Rodman (12)	Scottie Pippen (7)	US Airways Arena; 18,756	47–6
54	February 22	Golden State	W 120–87	Michael Jordan (34)	Dennis Rodman (12)	Harper & Kerr (7)	United Center; 23,917	48–6
55	February 24	Portland	W 116–89	Michael Jordan (37)	Dennis Rodman (15)	Scottie Pippen (11)	United Center; 23,841	49–6
56	February 27	@ Cleveland	L 70–73	Michael Jordan (23)	Dennis Rodman (16)	Michael Jordan (4)	Gund Arena; 20,562	49–7
57	February 28	Sacramento	W 126–108	Michael Jordan (35)	Dennis Rodman (11)	Harper & Jordan (6)	United Center; 23,836	50–7

March: 12–2 (home: 8–0; road: 4–2)

Game	Date	Team	Score	High points	High rebounds	High assists	Location Attendance	Record
58	March 3	Milwaukee	W 108–90	Michael Jordan (31)	Dennis Rodman (11)	Dennis Rodman (7)	United Center; 23,894	51–7
59	March 5	San Antonio	W 111–69	Scottie Pippen (19)	Caffey & Longley (10)	Randy Brown (8)	United Center; 23,841	52–7
60	March 7	Indiana	W 104–96	Michael Jordan (38)	Dennis Rodman (18)	Scottie Pippen (9)	United Center; 23,902	53–7
61	March 9	@ New York	L 93–97	Michael Jordan (36)	Dennis Rodman (19)	Jordan & Pippen (4)	Madison Square Garden; 19,763	53–8
62	March 11	@ Boston	W 117–106	Michael Jordan (32)	Dennis Rodman (16)	Michael Jordan (9)	FleetCenter; 18,624	54–8
63	March 12	@ Philadelphia	W 108–104	Scottie Pippen (31)	Dennis Rodman (17)	Scottie Pippen (8)	CoreStates Center; 21,061	55–8
64	March 14	@ New Jersey	L 98–99	Michael Jordan (36)	Dennis Rodman (17)	Scottie Pippen (9)	Continental Airlines Arena; 20,049	55–9
65	March 15	Atlanta	W 99–79	Scottie Pippen (17)	Dennis Rodman (14)	Longley & Pippen (7)	United Center; 23,984	56–9
66	March 18	Seattle	W 89–87 (OT)	Michael Jordan (32)	Michael Jordan (18)	Scottie Pippen (7)	United Center; 23,989	57–9
67	March 21	@ Indiana	W 117–98	Michael Jordan (36)	Dennis Rodman (19)	Scottie Pippen (8)	Market Square Arena; 16,759	58–9
68	March 22	Detroit	W 103–88	Scottie Pippen (26)	Dennis Rodman (18)	Michael Jordan (7)	United Center; 23,896	59–9
69	March 25	Dallas	W 94–92	Jordan & Kerr (20)	Dennis Rodman (21)	Scottie Pippen (6)	United Center; 23,854	60–9
70	March 27	@ Toronto	W 96–83	Longley & Pippen (16)	Michael Jordan (10)	Scottie Pippen (7)	SkyDome; 34,104	61–9
71	March 29	New Jersey	W 111–101	Scottie Pippen (31)	Scottie Pippen (8)	Michael Jordan (10)	United Center; 23,916	62–9

April: 7–4 (home: 4–1; road: 3–3)

Game	Date	Team	Score	High points	High rebounds	High assists	Location Attendance	Record
72	April 1	Boston	W 111–106	Michael Jordan (21)	Jason Caffey (9)	Scottie Pippen (7)	United Center; 23,906	63–9
73	April 3	@ Washington	L 102–110	Michael Jordan (34)	Caffey & Kukoč (8)	Michael Jordan (6)	US Airways Arena; 18,756	63–10
74	April 4	Cleveland	W 84–71	Michael Jordan (22)	Scottie Pippen (7)	Luc Longley (6)	United Center; 23,955	64–10
75	April 6	@ Orlando	W 110–94	Michael Jordan (37)	Caffey & Jordan (8)	Michael Jordan (5)	Orlando Arena; 17,248	65–10
76	April 7	Philadelphia	W 128–102	Michael Jordan (30)	Luc Longley (11)	Ron Harper (7)	United Center; 23,618	66–10
77	April 9	@ Indiana	W 86–80	Michael Jordan (23)	Jason Caffey (16)	Scottie Pippen (3)	Market Square Arena; 16,760	67–10
78	April 10	@ New York	W 105–103	Michael Jordan (34)	Caffey & Jordan (8)	Michael Jordan (6)	Madison Square Garden; 19,763	68–10
79	April 13	@ Detroit	L 91–108	Scottie Pippen (21)	Jason Caffey (10)	Michael Jordan (7)	The Palace of Auburn Hills; 21,454	68–11
80	April 14	Toronto	W 117–100	Michael Jordan (30)	Michael Jordan (11)	Michael Jordan (10)	United Center; 23,896	69–11
81	April 16	@ Miami	L 92–102	Scottie Pippen (28)	Michael Jordan (8)	Luc Longley (5)	Miami Arena; 15,200	69–12
82	April 19	New York	L 101–103	Michael Jordan (33)	3 players tied (6)	Scottie Pippen (12)	United Center; 24,161	69–13

1996–97 schedule

=== Playoffs ===
1997 playoff game log
Total: 15–4 (Home: 10–1; Road: 5–3)
First Round: 3–0 (home: 2–0; road: 1–0)

Game	Date	Team	Score	High points	High rebounds	High assists	Location Attendance	Series
1	April 25	Washington	W 98–86	Michael Jordan (29)	Scottie Pippen (10)	Michael Jordan (8)	United Center; 24,122	1–0
2	April 27	Washington	W 109–104	Michael Jordan (55)	Scottie Pippen (9)	Luc Longley (6)	United Center; 24,267	2–0
3	April 30	@ Washington	W 96–95	Michael Jordan (28)	Dennis Rodman (10)	Michael Jordan (6)	US Airways Arena; 18,756	3–0

Conference Semifinals: 4–1 (home: 2–1; road: 2–0)

Game	Date	Team	Score	High points	High rebounds	High assists	Location Attendance	Series
1	May 6	Atlanta	W 100–97	Michael Jordan (34)	Michael Jordan (11)	Michael Jordan (6)	United Center; 24,397	1–0
2	May 8	Atlanta	L 95–103	Michael Jordan (27)	Michael Jordan (16)	Scottie Pippen (9)	United Center; 24,544	1–1
3	May 10	@ Atlanta	W 100–80	Michael Jordan (21)	Jason Caffey (11)	Kukoč & Pippen (5)	Omni Coliseum; 16,378	2–1
4	May 11	@ Atlanta	W 89–80	Michael Jordan (27)	Jordan & Pippen (8)	3 players tied (4)	Omni Coliseum; 16,378	3–1
5	May 13	Atlanta	W 107–92	Michael Jordan (24)	Dele & Longley (10)	Jordan & Pippen (7)	United Center; 24,544	4–1

Conference Finals: 4–1 (home: 3–0; road: 1–1)

Game	Date	Team	Score	High points	High rebounds	High assists	Location Attendance	Series
1	May 20	Miami	W 84–77	Michael Jordan (37)	Dennis Rodman (19)	Harper & Pippen (4)	United Center; 24,544	1–0
2	May 22	Miami	W 75–68	Jordan & Pippen (23)	Dennis Rodman (10)	Ron Harper (6)	United Center; 24,544	2–0
3	May 24	@ Miami	W 98–74	Michael Jordan (34)	Dennis Rodman (9)	Toni Kukoč (6)	Miami Arena; 14,720	3–0
4	May 26	@ Miami	L 80–87	Michael Jordan (29)	Dennis Rodman (11)	Scottie Pippen (5)	Miami Arena; 14,720	3–1
5	May 28	Miami	W 100–87	Michael Jordan (28)	Dennis Rodman (13)	Toni Kukoč (7)	United Center; 24,544	4–1

NBA Finals: 4–2 (home: 3–0; road: 1–2)

Game	Date	Team	Score	High points	High rebounds	High assists	Location Attendance	Series
1	June 1	Utah	W 84–82	Michael Jordan (31)	Dennis Rodman (12)	Michael Jordan (8)	United Center; 24,544	1–0
2	June 4	Utah	W 97–85	Michael Jordan (38)	Michael Jordan (13)	Michael Jordan (9)	United Center; 24,544	2–0
3	June 6	@ Utah	L 93–104	Scottie Pippen (27)	Ron Harper (7)	Michael Jordan (6)	Delta Center; 19,911	2–1
4	June 8	@ Utah	L 73–78	Michael Jordan (22)	Scottie Pippen (12)	3 players tied (4)	Delta Center; 19,911	2–2
5	June 11	@ Utah	W 90–88	Michael Jordan (38)	Scottie Pippen (10)	Jordan & Pippen (5)	Delta Center; 19,911	3–2
6	June 13	Utah	W 90–86	Michael Jordan (39)	Jordan & Rodman (11)	Michael Jordan (4)	United Center; 24,544	4–2

1997 schedule

== Player stats ==
Legend
GP	Games played	GS	Games started	MPG	Minutes per game
FG%	Field-goal percentage	3P%	3-point field-goal percentage	FT%	Free-throw percentage
RPG	Rebounds per game	APG	Assists per game	SPG	Steals per game
BPG	Blocks per game	PPG	Points per game

=== Regular season ===
Player	GP	GS	MPG	FG%	3P%	FT%	RPG	APG	SPG	BPG	PPG
Randy Brown	72	3	14.7	.420	.182	.679	1.5	1.8	1.12	.24	4.7
Jud Buechler	76	0	9.2	.367	.333	.357	1.7	.8	.30	.28	1.8
Jason Caffey	75	19	18.7	.532	.000	.659	4.0	1.2	.33	.12	7.3
Bison Dele	9	0	15.3	.413	.000	.733	3.7	1.3	.33	.56	7.0
Ron Harper	76	74	22.9	.436	.362	.707	2.5	2.5	1.13	.50	6.3
Michael Jordan	82	82	37.9	.486	.374	.833	5.9	4.3	1.71	.54	29.6
Steve Kerr	82	0	22.7	.533	.464	.806	1.6	2.1	.82	.04	8.1
Toni Kukoč	57	15	28.2	.471	.331	.770	4.6	4.5	1.05	.51	13.2
Luc Longley	59	59	24.9	.456	.000	.792	5.6	2.4	.39	1.12	9.1
Robert Parish	43	3	9.4	.490	.000	.677	2.1	.5	.14	.44	3.7
Scottie Pippen	82	82	37.7	.474	.368	.701	6.5	5.7	1.88	.55	20.2
Dennis Rodman	55	54	35.4	.448	.263	.568	16.1	3.1	.58	.35	5.7
Dickey Simpkins	48	0	8.2	.333	.250	.700	1.9	.6	.10	.10	1.9
Matt Steigenga	2	0	6.0	.250	.000	.500	1.5	1.0	.50	.50	1.5
Bill Wennington	61	19	12.8	.498	.000	.830	2.1	.7	.16	.18	4.6

=== Playoffs ===
Player	GP	GS	MPG	FG%	3P%	FT%	RPG	APG	SPG	BPG	PPG
Randy Brown	17		5.8	.300	.000	.600	.6	.4	.47	.12	1.2
Jud Buechler	18		7.7	.419	.333	.600	1.3	.3	.17	.06	1.8
Jason Caffey	17	5	9.8	.455	.000	.786	2.5	.9	.18	.18	2.4
Bison Dele	19		17.7	.481	.000	.516	3.7	.6	1.00	.42	6.1
Ron Harper	19	19	27.1	.400	.344	.750	4.3	3.0	1.26	.74	7.5
Michael Jordan	19	19	42.3	.456	.194	.831	7.9	4.8	1.58	.89	31.1
Steve Kerr	19		17.9	.429	.381	.929	.9	1.1	.89	.11	5.0
Toni Kukoč	19		22.3	.360	.358	.707	2.8	2.8	.68	.21	7.9
Luc Longley	19	19	22.7	.548	.000	.385	4.4	1.8	.37	.84	6.5
Robert Parish	2		9.0	.143	.000	.000	2.0	.0	.00	1.50	1.0
Scottie Pippen	19	19	39.6	.417	.345	.791	6.8	3.8	1.47	.95	19.2
Dennis Rodman	19	14	28.2	.370	.250	.577	8.4	1.4	.53	.21	4.2

Player statistics citation:

== NBA finals ==
=== Schedule ===
- Game 1 – June 1, Sunday @Chicago, Chicago 84, Utah 82: Chicago leads series 1-0
- Game 2 – June 4, Wednesday @Chicago, Chicago 97, Utah 85: Chicago leads series 2-0
- Game 3 – June 6, Friday @Utah, Utah 104, Chicago 93: Chicago leads series 2-1
- Game 4 – June 8, Sunday @Utah, Utah 78, Chicago 73: Series tied 2-2
- Game 5 – June 11, Wednesday @Utah, Chicago 90, Utah 88: Chicago leads series 3-2
- Game 6 – June 13, Friday @Chicago, Chicago 90, Utah 86: Chicago wins series 4-2

The Finals were played using a 2-3-2 site format, where the first two and last two games are held at the team with home court advantage's (Chicago's) home court (United Center).

=== Game 1 ===
Sunday, June 1, at the United Center

Team	1	2	3	4	Total
Utah	18	24	22	18	82
Chicago	17	21	24	22	84

=== Game 2 ===
Wednesday, June 4, at the United Center

Team	1	2	3	4	Total
Utah	20	11	28	26	85
Chicago	25	22	31	19	97

=== Game 3 ===
Friday, June 6, at the Delta Center

Team	1	2	3	4	Total
Chicago	22	23	15	33	93
Utah	31	30	16	27	104

=== Game 4 ===
Sunday, June 8, at the Delta Center

Team	1	2	3	4	Total
Chicago	16	24	16	17	73
Utah	21	14	21	22	78

=== Game 5: The Flu Game ===
Wednesday, June 11, at the Delta Center

Game 5, often referred to as "The Flu Game", was one of Michael Jordan's most memorable. Just 24 hours earlier, on June 10, 1997, Jordan woke up nauseated and sweating profusely. He hardly had the strength to sit up in bed and was diagnosed with a stomach virus or food poisoning. The Bulls trainers told Jordan that there was no way he could play in the game. The Jazz had just won two in a row to tie the series, and Chicago needed their leader in this critical swing game. Against all odds, Jordan rose from bed at 3:00 p.m., just in time for the 6:00 tip-off at the Delta Center.

Jordan was visibly weak and pale as he stepped onto the court for Game Five. At first, he displayed no energy whatsoever, and John Stockton, along with reigning MVP Karl Malone, quickly led the Jazz to a 16-point lead. But in the second quarter, Jordan started to sink shots despite lacking his usual explosive speed and hardly being able to concentrate. He scored 17 points in the quarter as the Bulls hit the front before halftime.

Luc Longley and Scottie Pippen did their best to keep the Bulls in the game while Jordan was fatigued again in the third. But Jordan turned it on again, scoring 15 points in the fourth quarter, including a clutch rebound and three-point shot with the game tied and under a minute left that put the Bulls up by three points. Chicago held on for a narrow victory.

Jordan finished the game with 38 points, seven rebounds, five assists, three steals and one block. Malone was the highest-scoring Jazz player with 19 points but suffered from some dreadful shooting. Jordan stayed on the court for 44 minutes, resting for only four minutes while being perpetually at the brink of fainting. With only a few seconds remaining and the game finally at hand, Jordan collapsed into Scottie Pippen's arms.

- Game Recap
- Box Score

Team	1	2	3	4	Total
Chicago	16	33	18	23	90
Utah	29	24	19	16	88

=== Game 6 ===
Friday, June 13, at the United Center

Michael Jordan was not fully recovered from the flu, but was feeling much better and led the Bulls with 39 points. In the third quarter Michael Jordan dunked after a steal, bringing the crowd to its feet. The Bulls trailed by 9 points early in the fourth quarter but went on a 10–0 run to take their first lead since the opening minutes when Steve Kerr hit a 3-pointer, but the Jazz would regain the lead. In the final minutes, Jordan's fadeaway on the baseline put the Bulls up by 3, before Bryon Russell hit a three-pointer to tie the game at 86-86. The two teams would fail to score on their next possessions. With 28 seconds left after Shandon Anderson missed a reverse layup, the Jazz expected Jordan to take the final shot. Instead, Jordan passed off to Steve Kerr, who hit a shot with 5 seconds left to send the United Center crowd into a frenzy. The Jazz looked for one final shot to stay alive, but Scottie Pippen made a massive defensive play as he knocked away Bryon Russell's inbound pass intended for Shandon Anderson and was able to pass the ball over to Toni Kukoč, who dunked the final 2 points of the game to bring the Finals to an end. Afterwards, Jordan was named the NBA Finals MVP.

Team	1	2	3	4	Total
Utah	23	21	26	16	86
Chicago	17	20	27	26	90

== Awards and honors ==
- Scottie Pippen, Forward, NBA's 50th Anniversary All-Time Team
- Michael Jordan, Guard, NBA's 50th Anniversary All-Time Team
- Robert Parish, Center, NBA's 50th Anniversary All-Time Team
- Michael Jordan, All-NBA Team, First Team
- Michael Jordan, Guard, NBA Finals MVP
- Michael Jordan, NBA All-Defensive First Team
- Michael Jordan, Regular season leader, Field Goals (920)
- Michael Jordan, Regular season leader, Field Goal Attempts (1892)
- Michael Jordan, Regular season leader, Total Points (2431)
- Michael Jordan, Regular season leader, Scoring Average (29.6 points per game)
- Scottie Pippen, All-NBA Team, Second Team
- Scottie Pippen, NBA All-Defensive First Team

=== NBA All-Star Game ===
- Michael Jordan, Guard
- Scottie Pippen, Forward
