= 1996–97 NBA season =

51st NBA season

- League: National Basketball Association
- Sport: Basketball
- Duration: November 1, 1996 – April 20, 1997; April 24 – May 29, 1997 (Playoffs); June 1 – 13, 1997 (Finals)
- Teams: 29
- TV partner(s): NBC, TBS, TNT

Draft
- Top draft pick: Allen Iverson
- Picked by: Philadelphia 76ers

Regular season
- Top seed: Chicago Bulls
- Season MVP: Karl Malone (Utah)
- Top scorer: Michael Jordan (Chicago)

Playoffs
- Eastern champions: Chicago Bulls
- Eastern runners-up: Miami Heat
- Western champions: Utah Jazz
- Western runners-up: Houston Rockets

Finals
- Champions: Chicago Bulls
- Runners-up: Utah Jazz
- Finals MVP: Michael Jordan (Chicago)

NBA seasons
- ← 1995–96 1997–98 →

The 1996–97 NBA season was the 51st season of the National Basketball Association (NBA). The league used this season to celebrate its 50th anniversary, which included the unveiling of the league's list of its 50 greatest players. This particular season featured what has since been acknowledged as one of the most talented rookie-classes, featuring the debuts of Allen Iverson, Ray Allen, Kobe Bryant, Steve Nash, Jermaine O'Neal, Ben Wallace and Stephon Marbury. The season ended with the Chicago Bulls defeating the Utah Jazz 4 games to 2 in the NBA Finals to win the franchise's fifth championship.

== 1996 NBA lockout ==
The 1996 NBA lockout was the second lockout of four in the history of the NBA. It took place on July 10, 1996. The lockout was imposed after the league and the players union could not reach an agreement involving $50 million in profit sharing from television revenue. The league requested 50 percent of the profits be applied toward player salaries while the union pushed for a larger share. After a few hours of talks, the league agreed to allocate an additional $14 million per season in television revenue toward the salary cap during the last four years of the six-year collective bargaining agreement. The agreement ending the lockout was announced a few hours after the lockout began.

== Notable occurrences ==
Coaching changes
Offseason
| Team | 1995–96 coach | 1996–97 coach |
|---|---|---|
| Charlotte Hornets | Allan Bristow | Dave Cowens |
| Dallas Mavericks | Dick Motta | Jim Cleamons |
| Milwaukee Bucks | Mike Dunleavy, Sr. | Chris Ford |
| New Jersey Nets | Butch Beard | John Calipari |
| Philadelphia 76ers | John Lucas | Johnny Davis |
| Phoenix Suns | Cotton Fitzsimmons | Danny Ainge |
| Toronto Raptors | Brendan Malone | Darrell Walker |
In–season
| Team | Outgoing coach | Incoming coach |
| Denver Nuggets | Bernie Bickerstaff | Dick Motta |
| Orlando Magic | Brian Hill | Richie Adubato |
| Sacramento Kings | Garry St. Jean | Eddie Jordan |
| San Antonio Spurs | Bob Hill | Gregg Popovich |
| Vancouver Grizzlies | Brian Winters | Stu Jackson |
| Washington Bullets | Jim Lynam | Bob Staak |
| Washington Bullets | Bob Staak | Bernie Bickerstaff |

- The Chicago Bulls missed back to back 70 win seasons, going 69–13, tying the second best all-time record (with the 1971–72 Los Angeles Lakers season). With four games to play, the Bulls' record stood at 68–10, only needing a 2–2 split; however, they went 1–3 in those games. In the final game of the regular season, the Bulls lost to the Knicks 103–101 as Scottie Pippen missed a three-pointer that would have given the Bulls back to back 70 win seasons. This loss also prevented the Bulls from tying the best home record of 40–1, set by the 1985–86 Boston Celtics, finishing 39–2 at the United Center.
- The 1997 NBA All-Star Game was played at Gund Arena in Cleveland, Ohio, with the East defeating the West 132–120. Glen Rice of the Charlotte Hornets was named the game's MVP after scoring a record 20 points in the third quarter, and 24 in the second half. Minnesota Timberwolves forward Kevin Garnett became the youngest player to play in the All-Star Game. Coincidentally, the MLB All-Star Game would be played at nearby Jacobs Field in July, giving Cleveland the distinction of hosting two All-Star Games in the same year.
- The New Jersey Nets and Orlando Magic both played two games against each other in Tokyo, Japan early into the season.
- The Philadelphia 76ers played their first season at the Core States Center (later First Union, Wachovia and Wells Fargo Center, now Xfinity Mobile Arena).
- The Los Angeles Lakers signed free-agent center Shaquille O'Neal. Along with the addition of Kobe Bryant, the duo would become a fixture on the team for eight years, winning three championships together. However, a media created feud would eventually lead to O'Neal being traded to Miami in 2004.
- Allen Iverson set a rookie record scoring with forty points or more in five games.
- Due to extensive renovations at Oakland Coliseum Arena, the Golden State Warriors played their home games at the San Jose Arena (later the HP Pavilion at San Jose, now known as the SAP Center at San Jose), home of the NHL's San Jose Sharks. Following the season, the renovated arena became known as The Arena in Oakland, and was later renamed after the Oracle software company they continued at the arena until the Warriors' moved back to San Francisco's new arena the Chase Center for the 2019–20 season.
- Dennis Rodman was suspended for 11 games after kicking a cameraman in a road game against the Minnesota Timberwolves after tripping over him.
- In the last game of the regular season for both teams, the Washington Bullets defeated the Cleveland Cavaliers to obtain the eighth and final playoff spot in the Eastern Conference. Had Cleveland won, the Cavaliers would have qualified instead. As for the Bullets, this was their final playoff appearance until 2005 where the team was renamed the "Wizards". It was the last time until the 2017-18 NBA season a regular-season game has served as a direct play-in game to the postseason.
- Following a last-second three-point shot by John Stockton in Game 6 of the Western Conference Finals, the Utah Jazz made their first ever NBA Finals appearance.
- The rivalry between the New York Knicks and the Miami Heat got underway in Game 5 of the Conference Semifinals with a brawl at Miami Arena. In that brawl, P. J. Brown flipped Charlie Ward on the hardwood, inciting a bench brawl between the two. As a result, Brown was handed a two-game suspension, while Ward was suspended for Game 6. Meanwhile, as a result of leaving the bench during the brawl, Patrick Ewing and Allan Houston were suspended for Game 6, while Larry Johnson and John Starks were suspended for Game 7. The Heat eventually won the series in seven games.
- In Game 4 of the Western Conference Semifinals against the Lakers, Karl Malone hit all 18 of his free-throw attempts, setting a playoff record for most attempts without a miss, since broken by Paul Pierce and Dirk Nowitzki.
- After seven seasons of futility, the Minnesota Timberwolves finally made a postseason appearance, becoming the last of the late 1980s expansion teams to do so. In addition, their expansion counterparts (Charlotte, Orlando, and Miami) also made the playoffs. It would be seven years, however, before they could win their first playoff series.
- The Atlanta Hawks played their final season at The Omni Coliseum. The site of The Omni was demolished to make way for Philips Arena, forcing the Hawks to play most of their home games at the Georgia Dome and, in games featuring lesser-profile opponents, the Alexander Memorial Coliseum for the next two seasons.
- The season marked the fiftieth anniversary of the NBA. To commemorate the occasion, some NBA teams wore throwback uniforms they will not return again until the 2002–03 season in which Jordan's last season in the NBA, the NBA logo was decorated in gold for all uniforms, and the 50th anniversary logo patch was featured in the warmups. The 'NBA 50' logo also adorned all 29 NBA courts for the first month of the season, decorated in the respective team colors. In addition, the NBA also unveiled the 50 Greatest Players in NBA History during halftime of the 1997 NBA All-Star Game. One team, the Toronto Raptors, honored the Toronto Huskies BAA team by wearing the Huskies' throwback uniforms, and even played the New York Knicks at the SkyDome on the 50th anniversary of the first ever BAA/NBA game on November 1, 1996.
- The Boston Celtics not only set a record for the worst winning percentage and number of wins in franchise history, but also become the only NBA team to win only once in 24 games against other teams in its division, in its last game therein versus the Philadelphia 76ers. Several other teams, previously the 1970–71 Cleveland Cavaliers and latterly the 2005–06 Houston Rockets, the 2006–07 Milwaukee Bucks (ten years later, suffered to the same franchise worst record finished with 24–58 record including a franchise–record 18–game losing streak before both Kevin Garnett and Ray Allen arrived in Boston along with Paul Pierce and won the championship in 2008 against the Los Angeles Lakers.), the 2008–09 Washington Wizards, the 2010–11 Minnesota Timberwolves (Shaquille O'Neal's last season before retiring in June 2011), the 2017–18 Brooklyn Nets (coincidentally, only one win against the same Philadelphia 76ers team and also Kyrie Irving's first of two seasons spent with the Celtics before leaving the team during the 2019 offseason free agency.), the 2020–21 Detroit Pistons (As part of the shortening 72 game schedule due to COVID-19 pandemic started the regular season in late December 2020 until the end of the season in mid–May 2021) and the 2021–22 Portland Trail Blazers (As part of the NBA 75th Anniversary season), won only one divisional game in a shorter schedule.
- For the first time in NBA history, multiple teams – the above-mentioned Celtics and the second-year Vancouver Grizzlies – finished with a winning percentage below .200. This was to be repeated in 1997–98 (the Nuggets and the Raptors) and again during 1998–99 (the Grizzlies again and the Los Angeles Clippers) but has never occurred in any season since 1999–2000.
- After the San Antonio Spurs got off to a poor 3–15 start, general manager Gregg Popovich fired head coach Bob Hill. Popovich immediately took over as the head coach, beginning (as of the 2024–25 season) the NBA's longest active coaching tenure. The Spurs, after finishing the previous season with 59 victories, plunged to a 20–62 record while dealing with a myriad of injuries, especially to David Robinson and Sean Elliott. The 39-game decline was the worst regular-season turnaround in NBA history, surpassed 14 seasons later by the Cleveland Cavaliers, who lost 42 more games than the previous year.
- The greatest comeback in National Basketball Association play occurred on November 27, 1996, when the Utah Jazz, down by 36 points to the Denver Nuggets late in the second quarter (70–34), overcame this deficit to win 107–103.

== 1996–97 NBA changes ==
- The Boston Celtics changed their logo adding color.
- The Detroit Pistons changed their logo and uniforms, replacing their primary blue and red colors with teal with side panels to their jerseys and shorts.
- The Golden State Warriors played at the San Jose Arena, due to renovations at the Oakland Coliseum Arena.
- The Minnesota Timberwolves changed their logo and uniforms, adding dark blue and black to their color scheme.
- The Philadelphia 76ers moved into the CoreStates Center.
- The Utah Jazz changed their logo and uniforms with purple, blue and teal colors.

== Final standings ==
=== By division ===
Eastern Conference

| Atlantic Division | W | L | PCT | GB | Home | Road | Div |
|---|---|---|---|---|---|---|---|
| y-Miami Heat | 61 | 21 | .744 | – | 29–12 | 32–9 | 16–8 |
| x-New York Knicks | 57 | 25 | .695 | 4 | 31–10 | 26–15 | 19–6 |
| x-Orlando Magic | 45 | 37 | .549 | 16 | 26–15 | 19–22 | 13–11 |
| x-Washington Bullets | 44 | 38 | .537 | 17 | 25–16 | 19–22 | 14–10 |
| New Jersey Nets | 26 | 56 | .317 | 35 | 16–25 | 10–31 | 11–13 |
| Philadelphia 76ers | 22 | 60 | .268 | 39 | 11–30 | 11–30 | 11–14 |
| Boston Celtics | 15 | 67 | .183 | 46 | 11–30 | 4–37 | 1–23 |

| Central Division | W | L | PCT | GB | Home | Road | Div |
|---|---|---|---|---|---|---|---|
| y-Chicago Bulls | 69 | 13 | .841 | – | 39–2 | 30–11 | 24–4 |
| x-Atlanta Hawks | 56 | 26 | .683 | 13 | 36–5 | 20–21 | 17–11 |
| x-Detroit Pistons | 54 | 28 | .659 | 15 | 30–11 | 24–17 | 17–11 |
| x-Charlotte Hornets | 54 | 28 | .659 | 15 | 30–11 | 24–17 | 14–14 |
| Cleveland Cavaliers | 42 | 40 | .512 | 27 | 25–16 | 17–24 | 13–15 |
| Indiana Pacers | 39 | 43 | .476 | 30 | 21–20 | 18–23 | 11–17 |
| Milwaukee Bucks | 33 | 49 | .402 | 36 | 20–21 | 13–28 | 10–18 |
| Toronto Raptors | 30 | 52 | .366 | 39 | 18–23 | 12–29 | 6–22 |

Western Conference

| Midwest Division | W | L | PCT | GB | Home | Road | Div |
|---|---|---|---|---|---|---|---|
| y-Utah Jazz | 64 | 18 | .780 | – | 38–3 | 26–15 | 19–5 |
| x-Houston Rockets | 57 | 25 | .695 | 7 | 30–11 | 27–14 | 19–5 |
| x-Minnesota Timberwolves | 40 | 42 | .488 | 24 | 25–16 | 15–26 | 16–8 |
| Dallas Mavericks | 24 | 58 | .293 | 40 | 14–27 | 10–31 | 9–15 |
| Denver Nuggets | 21 | 61 | .256 | 43 | 12–29 | 9–32 | 7–17 |
| San Antonio Spurs | 20 | 62 | .244 | 44 | 12–29 | 8–33 | 8–16 |
| Vancouver Grizzlies | 14 | 68 | .171 | 50 | 8–33 | 6–35 | 6–18 |

| Pacific Division | W | L | PCT | GB | Home | Road | Div |
|---|---|---|---|---|---|---|---|
| y-Seattle SuperSonics | 57 | 25 | .695 | – | 31–10 | 26–15 | 16–8 |
| x-Los Angeles Lakers | 56 | 26 | .683 | 1 | 31–10 | 25–16 | 18–6 |
| x-Portland Trail Blazers | 49 | 33 | .598 | 8 | 29–12 | 20–21 | 15–9 |
| x-Phoenix Suns | 40 | 42 | .488 | 17 | 25–16 | 15–26 | 13–11 |
| x-Los Angeles Clippers | 36 | 46 | .439 | 21 | 21–20 | 15–26 | 10–14 |
| Sacramento Kings | 34 | 48 | .415 | 23 | 22–19 | 12–29 | 8–16 |
| Golden State Warriors | 30 | 52 | .366 | 27 | 18–23 | 12–29 | 4–20 |

=== By conference ===
1996–97 NBA East standings
| # | Eastern Conference | | | | |
| # | Team | W | L | PCT | GB |
|---|---|---|---|---|---|
| 1 | z-Chicago Bulls | 69 | 13 | .841 | – |
| 2 | y-Miami Heat | 61 | 21 | .744 | 8 |
| 3 | x-New York Knicks | 57 | 25 | .695 | 12 |
| 4 | x-Atlanta Hawks | 56 | 26 | .683 | 13 |
| 5 | x-Detroit Pistons | 54 | 28 | .659 | 15 |
| 6 | x-Charlotte Hornets | 54 | 28 | .659 | 15 |
| 7 | x-Orlando Magic | 45 | 37 | .549 | 24 |
| 8 | x-Washington Bullets | 44 | 38 | .537 | 25 |
| 9 | Cleveland Cavaliers | 42 | 40 | .512 | 27 |
| 10 | Indiana Pacers | 39 | 43 | .476 | 30 |
| 11 | Milwaukee Bucks | 33 | 49 | .402 | 36 |
| 12 | Toronto Raptors | 30 | 52 | .366 | 39 |
| 13 | New Jersey Nets | 26 | 56 | .317 | 43 |
| 14 | Philadelphia 76ers | 22 | 60 | .268 | 47 |
| 15 | Boston Celtics | 15 | 67 | .183 | 54 |

1996–97 NBA West standings
| # | Western Conference | | | | |
| # | Team | W | L | PCT | GB |
|---|---|---|---|---|---|
| 1 | c-Utah Jazz | 64 | 18 | .780 | – |
| 2 | y-Seattle SuperSonics | 57 | 25 | .695 | 7 |
| 3 | x-Houston Rockets | 57 | 25 | .695 | 7 |
| 4 | x-Los Angeles Lakers | 56 | 26 | .683 | 8 |
| 5 | x-Portland Trail Blazers | 49 | 33 | .598 | 15 |
| 6 | x-Minnesota Timberwolves | 40 | 42 | .488 | 24 |
| 7 | x-Phoenix Suns | 40 | 42 | .488 | 24 |
| 8 | x-Los Angeles Clippers | 36 | 46 | .439 | 28 |
| 9 | Sacramento Kings | 34 | 48 | .415 | 30 |
| 10 | Golden State Warriors | 30 | 52 | .366 | 34 |
| 11 | Dallas Mavericks | 24 | 58 | .293 | 40 |
| 12 | Denver Nuggets | 21 | 61 | .256 | 43 |
| 13 | San Antonio Spurs | 20 | 62 | .244 | 44 |
| 14 | Vancouver Grizzlies | 14 | 68 | .171 | 50 |

Notes

- z – Clinched home court advantage for the entire playoffs
- c – Clinched home court advantage for the conference playoffs
- y – Clinched division title
- x – Clinched playoff spot

== Playoffs ==
Teams in bold advanced to the next round. The numbers to the left of each team indicate the team's seeding in its conference, and the numbers to the right indicate the number of games the team won in that round. The division champions are marked by an asterisk. Home court advantage does not necessarily belong to the higher-seeded team, but instead the team with the better regular season record; teams enjoying the home advantage are shown in italics.

First Round | Conference Semifinals
**E1** | **Chicago*** | **3**
E8 | Washington | 0
**E1** | **Chicago*** | **4**
E4 | Atlanta | 1
**E4** | **Atlanta** | **3**
E5 | Detroit | 2
**Eastern Conference**
**E3** | **New York** | **3**
E6 | Charlotte | 0
E3 | New York | 3
**E2** | **Miami*** | **4**
**E2** | **Miami*** | **3**
E7 | Orlando | 2
**W1** | **Utah*** | **3**
W8 | LA Clippers | 0
**W1** | **Utah*** | **4**
W4 | LA Lakers | 1
**W4** | **LA Lakers** | **3**
W5 | Portland | 1
**Western Conference**
**W3** | **Houston** | **3**
W6 | Minnesota | 0
**W3** | **Houston** | **4**
W2 | Seattle* | 3
**W2** | **Seattle*** | **3**
W7 | Phoenix | 2

Conference Finals
**E1** | **Chicago*** | **4**
E2 | Miami* | 1
**W1** | **Utah*** | **4**
W3 | Houston | 2

NBA Finals
**E1** | **Chicago*** | **4**
W1 | Utah* | 2

- * Division winner
- **Bold** Series winner
- Italic Team with home-court advantage

== Statistics leaders ==
| Category | Player | Team | Stat |
|---|---|---|---|
| Points per game | Michael Jordan | Chicago Bulls | 29.6 |
| Rebounds per game | Dennis Rodman | Chicago Bulls | 16.1 |
| Assists per game | Mark Jackson | Indiana Pacers | 11.4 |
| Steals per game | Mookie Blaylock | Atlanta Hawks | 2.72 |
| Blocks per game | Shawn Bradley | New Jersey Nets | 3.40 |
| FG% | Gheorghe Mureșan | Washington Bullets | .604 |
| FT% | Mark Price | Golden State Warriors | .906 |
| 3FG% | Glen Rice | Charlotte Hornets | .470 |

== NBA awards ==
=== Yearly awards ===
- Most Valuable Player: Karl Malone (Utah Jazz)
- Rookie of the Year: Allen Iverson (Philadelphia 76ers)
- Defensive Player of the Year: Dikembe Mutombo (Atlanta Hawks)
- Sixth Man of the Year: John Starks (New York Knicks)
- Most Improved Player: Isaac Austin (Miami Heat)
- Coach of the Year: Pat Riley (Miami Heat)

- All-NBA First Team:
  - F – Karl Malone (Utah Jazz)
  - F – Grant Hill (Detroit Pistons)
  - C – Hakeem Olajuwon (Houston Rockets)
  - G – Michael Jordan (Chicago Bulls)
  - G – Tim Hardaway (Miami Heat)
- All-NBA Second Team:
  - F Scottie Pippen (Chicago Bulls)
  - F Glen Rice (Charlotte Hornets)
  - C Patrick Ewing (New York Knicks)
  - G Gary Payton (Seattle SuperSonics)
  - G Mitch Richmond (Sacramento Kings)
- All-NBA Third Team:
  - F Anthony Mason (Charlotte Hornets)
  - F Vin Baker (Milwaukee Bucks)
  - C Shaquille O'Neal (Los Angeles Lakers)
  - G John Stockton (Utah Jazz)
  - G Penny Hardaway (Orlando Magic)

- NBA All-Defensive First Team:
  - F Scottie Pippen (Chicago Bulls)
  - F Karl Malone (Utah Jazz)
  - C Dikembe Mutombo (Atlanta Hawks)
  - G Michael Jordan (Chicago Bulls)
  - G Gary Payton (Seattle SuperSonics)
- NBA All-Defensive Second Team:
  - F Anthony Mason (Charlotte Hornets)
  - F P. J. Brown (Miami Heat)
  - C Hakeem Olajuwon (Houston Rockets)
  - G Mookie Blaylock (Atlanta Hawks)
  - G John Stockton (Utah Jazz)

- NBA All-Rookie First Team:
  - Shareef Abdur-Rahim (Vancouver Grizzlies)
  - Allen Iverson (Philadelphia 76ers)
  - Stephon Marbury (Minnesota Timberwolves)
  - Marcus Camby (Toronto Raptors)
  - Antoine Walker (Boston Celtics)
- NBA All-Rookie Second Team:
  - Kerry Kittles (New Jersey Nets)
  - Ray Allen (Milwaukee Bucks)
  - Travis Knight (Los Angeles Lakers)
  - Kobe Bryant (Los Angeles Lakers)
  - Matt Maloney (Houston Rockets)

=== Player of the week ===
The following players were named NBA Player of the Week.

| Week | Player |
|---|---|
| Nov. 1 – Nov. 10 | Hakeem Olajuwon (Houston Rockets) |
| Nov. 11 – Nov. 17 | Dale Ellis (Denver Nuggets) |
| Nov. 18 – Nov. 24 (tie) | Charles Barkley (Houston Rockets) |
| Nov. 18 – Nov. 24 (tie) | Karl Malone (Utah Jazz) |
| Nov. 25 – Dec. 1 | Dikembe Mutombo (Atlanta Hawks) |
| Dec. 2 – Dec. 8 | Terry Mills (Detroit Pistons) |
| Dec. 9 – Dec. 15 | Shaquille O'Neal (Los Angeles Lakers) |
| Dec. 16 – Dec. 22 | Terrell Brandon (Cleveland Cavaliers) |
| Dec. 23 – Dec. 29 | Tim Hardaway (Miami Heat) |
| Dec. 30 – Jan. 5 | Glen Rice (Charlotte Hornets) |
| Jan. 6 – Jan. 12 | Glenn Robinson (Milwaukee Bucks) |
| Jan. 13 – Jan. 19 | Grant Hill (Detroit Pistons) |
| Jan. 20 – Jan. 26 | Mitch Richmond (Sacramento Kings) |
| Jan. 27 – Feb. 2 | Glen Rice (Charlotte Hornets) |
| Feb. 11 – Feb. 16 | Alonzo Mourning (Miami Heat) |
| Feb. 17 – Feb. 23 | Scottie Pippen (Chicago Bulls) |
| Feb. 24 – Mar. 2 | Loy Vaught (Los Angeles Clippers) |
| Mar. 3 – Mar. 9 | Patrick Ewing (New York Knicks) |
| Mar. 10 – Mar. 16 | Karl Malone (Utah Jazz) |
| Mar. 17 – Mar. 23 | Karl Malone (Utah Jazz) |
| Mar. 24 – Mar. 30 | Kevin Johnson (Phoenix Suns) |
| Apr. 1 – Apr. 6 | Grant Hill (Detroit Pistons) |
| Apr. 7 – Apr. 13 | Allen Iverson (Philadelphia 76ers) |
| Apr. 14 – Apr. 20 | Chris Webber (Washington Bullets) |

=== Player of the month ===
The following players were named NBA Player of the Month.

| Month | Player |
|---|---|
| November | Michael Jordan (Chicago Bulls) |
| December | Shaquille O'Neal (Los Angeles Lakers) |
| January | Grant Hill (Detroit Pistons) |
| February | Glen Rice (Charlotte Hornets) |
| March | Karl Malone (Utah Jazz) |
| April | Kevin Johnson (Phoenix Suns) |

=== Rookie of the month ===
The following players were named NBA Rookie of the Month.

| Month | Rookie |
|---|---|
| November | Allen Iverson (Philadelphia 76ers) |
| December (tie) | Shareef Abdur-Rahim (Vancouver Grizzlies) |
| December (tie) | Kerry Kittles (New Jersey Nets) |
| January | Stephon Marbury (Minnesota Timberwolves) |
| February | Shareef Abdur-Rahim (Vancouver Grizzlies) |
| March | Marcus Camby (Toronto Raptors) |
| April | Allen Iverson (Philadelphia 76ers) |

=== Coach of the month ===
The following coaches were named NBA Coach of the Month.

| Month | Coach |
|---|---|
| November | Rudy Tomjanovich (Houston Rockets) |
| December | Pat Riley (Miami Heat) |
| January | Lenny Wilkens (Atlanta Hawks) |
| February | Doug Collins (Detroit Pistons) |
| March | Jerry Sloan (Utah Jazz) |
| April | Dave Cowens (Charlotte Hornets) |

== See also ==
- List of NBA regular season records
