= 1997 NBA All-Star Game =

Exhibition basketball game

	1	2	3	4	Total
West	34	26	27	33	120
East	21	36	40	35	132
- Date: February 9, 1997
- Arena: Gund Arena
- City: Cleveland
- MVP: Glen Rice
- National anthem: Amanda Marshall (CAN); Brian McKnight and David Sanborn (USA)
- Halftime show: Presentation of the NBA's 50 Greatest Players
- Attendance: 20,562
- Network: NBC; TNT (All-Star Saturday)
- Announcers: Marv Albert, Matt Guokas and Bill Walton

NBA All-Star Game
< 1996	1998 >

The 1997 NBA All-Star Game was the 47th edition of the All-Star Game and commemorated the 50th anniversary of NBA. The game was played on February 9, 1997, at Gund Arena (now known as Rocket Arena) in Cleveland, home of the Cavaliers. The East won the game 132–120. The winner of the MVP award was Glen Rice of the Charlotte Hornets who played 25 minutes and scored 26 points while breaking two records in the process, 20 points in the third quarter and 24 points in the second half. Rice's 20 points in the period broke Hal Greer's record (19), set in 1968. Rice's 24 points in a half surpassed the previous mark of 23, owned by Wilt Chamberlain and Tom Chambers. Michael Jordan's 14 points, 11 rebounds, and 11 assists were the first and until the 2011 NBA All-Star Game the only triple-double in NBA All-Star Game history; LeBron James (2011), Dwyane Wade (2012), and Kevin Durant (2017) have also achieved this. Five players (Charles Barkley, Alonzo Mourning, Patrick Ewing, Clyde Drexler, Shaquille O'Neal) who were voted or selected for the team opted out due to injury, opening the doors for the annually neglected and the new stars—Joe Dumars, Detlef Schrempf, Chris Webber, Chris Gatling and 20-year-old second-year man Kevin Garnett took their spots.

For this NBA All-Star Game and the next four games that were played (1998, 2000–02), no special uniforms were issued, and the players simply wore the uniforms from their respective teams, a similar approach that used to be used by Major League Baseball for its All-Star Game. The halftime show featured a ceremony honoring the 50 Greatest Players in NBA History. Of the 50 players named, three were not present: Pete Maravich, who died in 1988, Shaquille O'Neal, who was recovering from a knee injury, and Jerry West, who was having surgery for an ear infection.

== Summary ==
=== Coaches ===
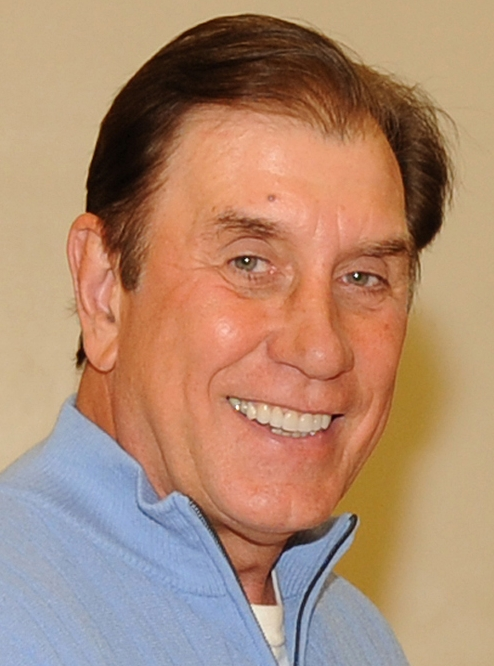
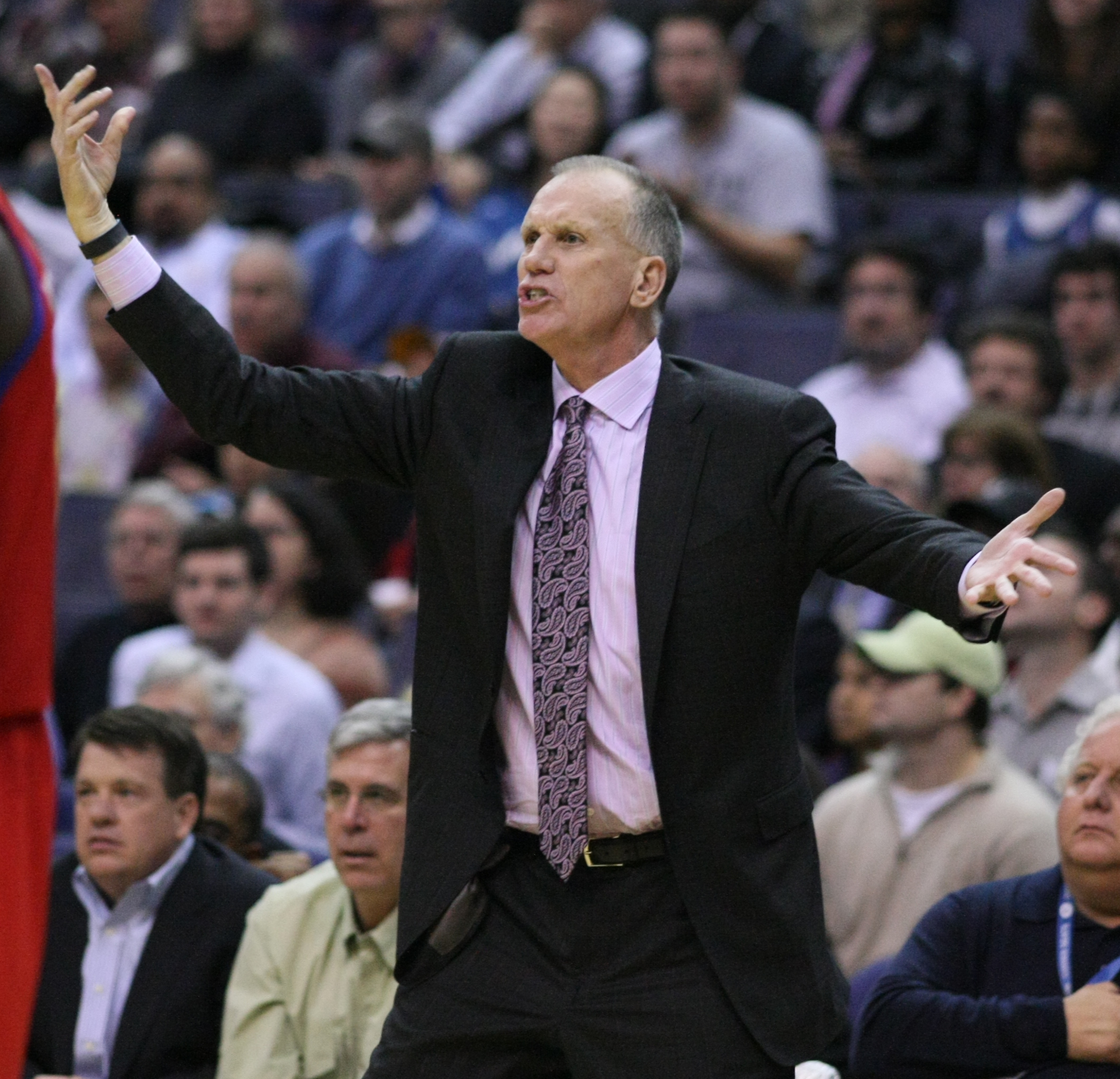
Houston Rockets' Rudy Tomjanovich and Detroit Pistons' Doug Collins were selected as the All-Star Game head coaches.

Rudy Tomjanovich, the head coach of the Western Conference leader Houston Rockets, coached the Western All-Stars. Although the Chicago Bulls have the best record in the Eastern Conference, their head coach, Phil Jackson, was ineligible to coach in the All-Star Game because he had coached in the 1996 game and league rules prohibit a coach from coaching in consecutive All-Star Games. In turn, Doug Collins, the head coach of the Detroit Pistons, coached the Eastern All-Stars as Detroit placed second in the East as of January 27.

=== Players ===
Eastern Conference All-Stars
Pos	Player	Team	No. of selections	Votes
Starters
G	Penny Hardaway	Orlando Magic	3rd	1,132,024
G	Michael Jordan	Chicago Bulls	11th	2,451,136
F	Scottie Pippen	Chicago Bulls	7th	1,683,956
F	Grant Hill	Detroit Pistons	3rd	1,868,020
C	Patrick Ewing^{INJ}	New York Knicks	11th	1,395,759
Reserves
F	Vin Baker	Milwaukee Bucks	3rd	269,994
G	Terrell Brandon	Cleveland Cavaliers	2nd	—
G	Joe Dumars^{REP}	Detroit Pistons	6th	428,535
G	Tim Hardaway	Miami Heat	4th	309,220
F	Christian Laettner	Atlanta Hawks	1st	225,893
C	Alonzo Mourning^{INJ}	Miami Heat	4th	1,041,570
C	Dikembe Mutombo	Atlanta Hawks	4th	541,528
F	Glen Rice	Charlotte Hornets	2nd	199,216
F	Chris Webber^{REP}	Washington Bullets	1st	396,365
Head coach: Doug Collins (Detroit Pistons)

Western Conference All-Stars
Pos	Player	Team	No. of selections	Votes
Starters
G	Gary Payton	Seattle SuperSonics	4th	1,206,539
G	John Stockton	Utah Jazz	9th	1,127,250
F	Charles Barkley^{INJ}	Houston Rockets	11th	1,877,232
F	Shawn Kemp	Seattle SuperSonics	5th	1,713,049
C	Hakeem Olajuwon	Houston Rockets	12th	1,487,310
Reserves
G	Clyde Drexler^{INJ}	Houston Rockets	10th	926,432
F	Kevin Garnett^{REP}	Minnesota Timberwolves	1st	481,911
F	Chris Gatling^{REP}	Dallas Mavericks	1st	—
F	Tom Gugliotta	Minnesota Timberwolves	1st	280,504
G	Eddie Jones	Los Angeles Lakers	1st	372,196
F	Karl Malone	Utah Jazz	10th	1,337,319
C	Shaquille O'Neal^{INJ}	Los Angeles Lakers	5th	1,305,941
G	Mitch Richmond	Sacramento Kings	5th	347,195
F	Detlef Schrempf^{REP}	Seattle SuperSonics	3rd	259,839
G	Latrell Sprewell	Golden State Warriors	3rd	—
Head coach: Rudy Tomjanovich (Houston Rockets)

^INJ Charles Barkley, Clyde Drexler, Patrick Ewing, Alonzo Mourning, and Shaquille O'Neal were unable to participate due to injury. Dikembe Mutombo replaced Ewing in the East starting lineup, and Karl Malone replaced Barkley in the West starting lineup. Barkley, Drexler, and Ewing were present, however, for the halftime ceremony.
^REP Detlef Schrempf, Chris Gatling, Chris Webber, Joe Dumars, and Kevin Garnett were chosen to replace Charles Barkley, Clyde Drexler, Patrick Ewing, Alonzo Mourning, and Shaquille O'Neal, respectively.

== Score by quarters ==
Score by periods:	1	2	3	4	Final
Western Conference	34	26	27	33	120
Eastern Conference	21	36	40	35	132

- Halftime— West, 60–57
- Third Quarter— East, 97–87
- Technical Fouls— none
- Officials— Hugh Evans, Bill Oakes, Ron Garretson
- Attendance— 20,562
- Time – 2:26
- Rating— 11.2/19 share (NBC).

== Three-point shootout ==
First Round
Player	Score
Walt Williams	18
Tim Legler	17
Glen Rice	16
Steve Kerr	15
John Stockton	13
Dale Ellis	12
Terry Mills	11
Sam Perkins	8

Semifinals
Player	Score
Steve Kerr	21
Tim Legler	19
Glen Rice	14
Walt Williams	12

Finals
Player	Score
Steve Kerr	22
Tim Legler	18

== Slam Dunk Competition ==
First Round
Player	Score
Chris Carr	44
Michael Finley	39
Kobe Bryant	37
Ray Allen	35
Bob Sura	35
Darvin Ham	36

Finals
Player	Score
Kobe Bryant	49
Chris Carr	45
Michael Finley	33

== Rookie Challenge ==
4th NBA Rookie Challenge Game. Date: February 8, 1997, at Gund Arena in Cleveland; Coaches: Eastern Conference: Red Auerbach; Western Conference: Red Holzman; MVP: Allen Iverson, Philadelphia (26 minutes, 19 points).

Team replacements: EAST— None; WEST— ?? for Minnesota guard Stephon Marbury, ?? for Dallas forward Samaki Walker.

=== Western Conference ===
Player	MIN	FGA	3PA	FTA	O	D	TOT	AST	PF	ST	TO	BS	PTS
Shareef Abdur-Rahim, VAN	24	8–13	1–2	0–0	0	4	4	1	1	1	2	1	17
Kobe Bryant, LAL	26	8–17	2–5	13–16	3	5	8	3	3	2	7	1	31
Travis Knight, LAL	20	3–5	0–0	3–4	2	2	4	1	4	1	2	1	9
Derek Fisher, LAL	15	5–9	1–2	5–5	0	0	0	6	4	0	0	0	15
Matt Maloney, HOU	24	2–10	1–4	0–0	1	3	4	4	0	3	3	0	5
Roy Rogers, VAN	23	1–3	0–0	0–0	1	1	2	0	1	1	0	2	2
Lorenzen Wright, LAC	11	3–6	0–0	1–2	2	2	4	0	2	0	1	1	7
Steve Nash, PHO	7	2–5	0–3	0–0	0	2	2	1	2	0	0	0	4
Totals	150	32–68	5–16	22–27	9	19	28	16	17	8	15	6	91

=== Eastern Conference ===
Player	MIN	FGA	3PA	FTA	O	D	TOT	AST	PF	ST	TO	BS	PTS
Antoine Walker, BOS	23	9–15	0–1	2–4	8	1	9	1	3	2	4	0	20
Marcus Camby, TOR	21	8–13	1–2	1–2	2	10	12	4	1	1	0	1	18
Erick Dampier, IND	15	5–6	0–0	1–2	2	5	7	1	2	1	2	1	11
Kerry Kittles, NJN	24	4–9	1–2	0–2	1	1	2	4	1	1	2	2	9
Allen Iverson, PHI	26	7–11	0–0	5–8	1	3	4	9	2	3	4	3	19
Vitaly Potapenko, CLE	12	3–4	0–0	0–0	0	0	0	0	3	1	0	0	6
John Wallace, NYK	15	2–7	0–2	1–3	2	1	3	0	1	0	1	0	5
Ray Allen, MIL	14	1–6	0–2	6–7	0	2	2	2	3	1	0	0	8
Totals	150	39–72	2–9	16–28	16	23	39	21	16	10	13	7	96

=== Score by periods ===
Score by periods:	1st	2nd	Final
Western Conference	36	55	91
Eastern Conference	51	45	96

- Officials: Nolan Fine, Bill Spooner, Michael Smith.
