= 1995–96 Vancouver Grizzlies season =

- Head coach: Brian Winters
- General manager: Stu Jackson
- Owners: Arthur Griffiths
- Arena: General Motors Place

Results
- Record: 15–67 (.183)
- Place: Division: 7th (Midwest); Conference: 14th (Western)
- Playoff finish: Did not qualify
- Stats at Basketball Reference

Local media
- Television: BCTV; Showcase
- Radio: CKNW

The 1995–96 Vancouver Grizzlies season was the inaugural season for the Vancouver Grizzlies in the National Basketball Association. The Grizzlies, along with the Toronto Raptors, became expansion NBA franchises in 1995; they were the first NBA teams to play in Canada since the 1946–47 Toronto Huskies.

== Season summary ==
=== Off-season ===
The Grizzlies revealed their new primary logo, adding turquoise, brown, black, red and white to their color scheme; the team's primary logo featured a brown grizzly bear with black shadows, holding a red basketball below the city name "Vancouver" in red letters with a black outline, and the team name "Grizzlies" in turquoise letters with a black outline, brown shadows and white scratch marks. The team also revealed new white home uniforms, and new turquoise road uniforms, which featured Native American markings on the trims of their jerseys, waistband, and the bottom right leg of their shorts, all surrounded by a red outline. In addition, both uniforms featured the city and team name on the front of their jerseys, while the shorts featured the team's primary logo of a grizzly bear on the left leg.

The Grizzlies' new primary logo would remain in use until 2001, where the team relocated to Memphis, Tennessee, and replaced the word "Vancouver" with "Memphis" on the logo; the original logo would last until 2004, while the new uniforms would remain in use until 2000. The Grizzlies played their home games at General Motors Place in Vancouver, British Columbia, Canada.

In the 1995 NBA expansion draft, the team selected veteran players like Greg Anthony, Blue Edwards, Byron Scott, Benoit Benjamin, Gerald Wilkins and Kenny Gattison; the team also signed free agents Chris King and undrafted power rookie forward Ashraf Amaya, and acquired Anthony Avent from the Orlando Magic. The Grizzlies received the sixth overall pick in the 1995 NBA draft, and selected center Bryant Reeves out of Oklahoma State University, and also hired Brian Winters as their first ever head coach.

=== Regular season ===
The Grizzlies made their NBA regular season debut on November 3, 1995, in which the team defeated the Portland Trail Blazers on the road, 92–80 at the Rose Garden Arena; Benjamin led the Grizzlies with 29 points, 13 rebounds and 3 blocks. Two nights later on November 5, the Grizzlies had a successful home debut at General Motors Place by defeating the Minnesota Timberwolves in overtime, 100–98. Scott led the team with 18 points off the bench, while King made a tip-in from Scott's missed jumper at the buzzer to win the game.

However, despite winning their first two games, the Grizzlies struggled and posted a dreadful 19-game losing streak between November and December afterwards, leading to an awful 2–19 start to the season. After 13 games, Benjamin was traded to the Milwaukee Bucks in exchange for Eric Murdock, and second-year forward Eric Mobley. The Grizzlies posted a six-game losing streak between January and February, and held a 10–37 record at the All-Star break. At mid-season, the team traded Gattison to the Orlando Magic in exchange for Jeff Turner; however, Turner never played for the Grizzlies due to a season-ending knee injury he sustained with the Magic. The Grizzlies then suffered a dreadful 23-game losing streak between February and April, including a winless month in March, in which the team posted an 0–17 record during that month, but managed to close the season with two straight victories. The Grizzlies finished their inaugural season in last place in the Midwest Division with a league-worst record of 15 wins and 67 losses.

Anthony led the Grizzlies in scoring with a low team-high average of 14.0 points, and contributed 6.9 assists and 1.7 steals per game, while Reeves averaged 13.3 points and 7.4 rebounds per game, and was named to the NBA All-Rookie Second Team, and Edwards provided the team with 12.7 points and 1.4 steals per game. In addition, Scott played a sixth man role off the bench, averaging 10.2 points per game, while Murdock contributed 9.1 points, 4.6 assists and 2.0 steals per game in 64 games after the trade, and King provided with 7.9 points and 3.6 rebounds per game. Meanwhile, Wilkins averaged 6.7 points per game, but only played just 28 games due to back and Achilles tendon injuries, rookie shooting guard, and second-round draft pick Lawrence Moten contributed 6.6 points per game, Amaya averaged 6.3 points and 5.6 rebounds per game, and Avent provided with 5.8 points and 5.6 rebounds per game.

During the NBA All-Star weekend at the Alamodome in San Antonio, Texas, Reeves was selected for the NBA Rookie Game, as a member of the Western Conference Rookie team. Anthony finished tied in 14th place in Most Improved Player voting. The Grizzlies finished 20th in the NBA in home-game attendance, with an attendance of 654,013 at General Motors Place during the regular season.

=== Aftermath ===
Following the season, Scott re-signed as a free agent with his former team, the Los Angeles Lakers, while Wilkins signed with the Orlando Magic, Murdock signed with the Denver Nuggets, Amaya signed with the Washington Bullets, and King, Avent and Turner were all released to free agency.

== Offseason ==
=== NBA expansion draft ===
The Grizzlies roster was filled during the 1995 NBA expansion draft. By way of winning a coin flip with the Toronto Raptors, Vancouver elected to choose the former, between a higher NBA draft pick and the first pick in the NBA expansion draft, and therefore had the second pick in this draft. With their first pick, the Grizzlies selected point guard Greg Anthony from the New York Knicks.

Pick	Player	Position	Nationality	Former Team
2	Greg Anthony	Point guard	United States	New York Knicks
4	Rodney Dent	Center	United States	Orlando Magic
6	Antonio Harvey	Forward	United States	Los Angeles Lakers
8	Reggie Slater	Power forward-center	United States	Denver Nuggets
10	Trevor Ruffin	Point guard	United States	Phoenix Suns
12	Derrick Phelps	Point guard	United States	Sacramento Kings
14	Larry Stewart	Power forward	United States	Washington Bullets
16	Kenny Gattison	Power forward	United States	Charlotte Hornets
18	Byron Scott	Shooting guard	United States	Indiana Pacers
20	Gerald Wilkins	Small forward	United States	Cleveland Cavaliers
22	Benoit Benjamin	Center	United States	New Jersey Nets
24	Doug Edwards	Forward	United States	Atlanta Hawks
26	Blue Edwards	Shooting guard	United States	Utah Jazz

=== NBA draft ===
The Grizzlies held both their original selections in their first NBA draft appearance. Their first ever draft pick was Bryant Reeves.

Round	Pick	Player	Position	Nationality	College
1	6	Bryant Reeves	Center	United States	Oklahoma State
2	36	Lawrence Moten	Guard	United States	Syracuse

== Roster ==
1995–96 Vancouver Grizzlies roster
Players

Pos.	No.	Player	Height	Weight	DOB	From
F	18	Ashraf Amaya	6 ft 8 in (2.03 m)	230 lb (104 kg)	1971–11–23	Southern Illinois
G	2	Greg Anthony	6 ft 0 in (1.83 m)	176 lb (80 kg)	1967–11–15	UNLV
F	34	Anthony Avent	6 ft 9 in (2.06 m)	235 lb (107 kg)	1969–10–18	Seton Hall
G	30	Blue Edwards	6 ft 4 in (1.93 m)	200 lb (91 kg)	1965–10–31	East Carolina
F	32	Doug Edwards	6 ft 7 in (2.01 m)	220 lb (100 kg)	1971–01–21	Florida State
F	17	Chris King	6 ft 8 in (2.03 m)	215 lb (98 kg)	1969–07–24	Wake Forest
C	15	Rich Manning (injured)	6 ft 11 in (2.11 m)	260 lb (118 kg)	1970–06–23	Washington
G	40	Cuonzo Martin	6 ft 5 in (1.96 m)	213 lb (97 kg)	1971–09–23	Purdue
C	52	Eric Mobley (injured)	6 ft 11 in (2.11 m)	235 lb (107 kg)	1970–02–01	Pittsburgh
G	7	Lawrence Moten	6 ft 5 in (1.96 m)	185 lb (84 kg)	1972–03–25	Syracuse
G	14	Eric Murdock	6 ft 1 in (1.85 m)	190 lb (86 kg)	1968–06–14	Providence
C	50	Bryant Reeves	7 ft 0 in (2.13 m)	290 lb (132 kg)	1973–06–08	Oklahoma State
G	4	Byron Scott	6 ft 3 in (1.91 m)	195 lb (88 kg)	1961–03–28	Arizona State
F	–	Jeff Turner (injured) (IN)	6 ft 9 in (2.06 m)	230 lb (104 kg)	1962–04–09	Vanderbilt
F	21	Gerald Wilkins	6 ft 6 in (1.98 m)	185 lb (84 kg)	1963–09–11	Chattanooga

Coaches
Head coach
- Brian Winters
Assistant(s)
- Lionel Hollins
- Rex Hughes
- Jimmy Powell

Legend
- (DP) Unsigned draft pick
- (FA) Free agent
- (S) Suspended
- (IN) Inactive
- Injured

Roster

=== Roster Notes ===
- Power forward Jeff Turner was acquired by the Grizzlies from the Orlando Magic in a mid-season trade, but was placed on the injured reserve list due to a knee injury he sustained with the Magic, and did not play for the Grizzlies.

== First game ==
- On November 3, 1995, Vancouver played their first ever game in Portland against the Trail Blazers and beat the Blazers by a score of 92–80. Benoit Benjamin scored a team high 29 points and 13 rebounds for the Grizzlies.

== Regular season ==
Although they won their first two games in franchise history, the Grizzlies finished with the worst win–loss record in the 1995–96 NBA season, as is typical for an expansion team, and lost 23 straight games from February to April (setting an NBA single-season record now held by the Philadelphia 76ers with 27.)

=== Highs ===
- On November 3, 1995, Vancouver plays their first ever game, defeating the Portland Trail Blazers by a score of 92–80 in Portland. On November 5, 1995, the Grizzlies make their home debut, defeating the Minnesota Timberwolves 100–98 in overtime in front of 19,113 fans, to begin the season with a 2–0 record.
- The Grizzlies defeat nearby rivals the Seattle SuperSonics by a single point in a hotly contested game on December 19, 1995. The crowd leaves ecstatic.
- The Grizzlies hold the Miami Heat to only 65 points in a 69–65 victory on January 13, 1996.
- Vancouver finishes the season on a positive note, defeating the Denver Nuggets and Los Angeles Clippers on the road.

=== Lows ===
- After starting the season 2–0, Vancouver would lose their next 19 games to quickly fall into last place in the Midwest Division.
- Vancouver was held to a season low 62 points in a 111–62 loss to the San Antonio Spurs on November 8, 1995.
- On December 10, 1995, the Grizzlies play the Toronto Raptors for the first time. The first NBA regular season game contested between two non-U.S. based teams. The game is held at General Motors Place in Vancouver. The Raptors win the game by a score of 93–81.
- On April 2, 1996, Vancouver loses its 23rd straight game, losing 101–85 to the Portland Trail Blazers. The loss was also the Grizzlies 29th in their last 30 games.

=== Season standings ===
Midwest Division	W	L	PCT	GB	Home	Road	Div
y-San Antonio Spurs	59	23	.720	–	33–8	26–15	19–5
x-Utah Jazz	55	27	.671	4	34–7	21–20	14–10
x-Houston Rockets	48	34	.585	11	27–14	21–20	15–9
Denver Nuggets	35	47	.427	24	24–17	11–30	13–11
Minnesota Timberwolves	26	56	.317	33	17–24	9–32	10–14
Dallas Mavericks	26	56	.317	33	16–25	10–31	10–14
Vancouver Grizzlies	15	67	.183	44	10–31	5–36	3–21

Western Conference
#	Team	W	L	PCT	GB	GP
1	c-Seattle SuperSonics *	64	18	.780	–	82
2	y-San Antonio Spurs *	59	23	.720	5	82
3	x-Utah Jazz	55	27	.671	9	82
4	x-Los Angeles Lakers	53	29	.646	11	82
5	x-Houston Rockets	48	34	.585	16	82
6	x-Portland Trail Blazers	44	38	.537	20	82
7	x-Phoenix Suns	41	41	.500	23	82
8	x-Sacramento Kings	39	43	.476	25	82
9	Golden State Warriors	36	46	.439	28	82
10	Denver Nuggets	35	47	.427	29	82
11	Los Angeles Clippers	29	53	.354	35	82
12	Minnesota Timberwolves	26	56	.317	38	82
13	Dallas Mavericks	26	56	.317	38	82
14	Vancouver Grizzlies	15	67	.183	49	82

=== Game log ===
#	Date	Opponent	Score	Record	Attendance
1	November 3	@ Portland Trail Blazers	92–80	1–0	19,115
2	November 5	Minnesota Timberwolves	100–98 (OT)	2–0	19,193
3	November 7	@ Dallas Mavericks	88–99	2–1	15,325
4	November 8	@ San Antonio Spurs	62–111	2–2	12,355
5	November 10	Los Angeles Clippers	91–98	2–3	17,345
6	November 11	@ Seattle SuperSonics	81–117	2–4	17,102
7	November 13	Dallas Mavericks	89–94	2–5	17,171
8	November 16	@ Los Angeles Clippers	98–103	2–6	10,169
9	November 17	Los Angeles Lakers	91–114	2–7	19,193
10	November 19	@ New York Knicks	93–98	2–8	19,763
11	November 22	@ Orlando Magic	93–95	2–9	17,248
12	November 24	@ Charlotte Hornets	104–116	2–10	24,042
13	November 25	@ Miami Heat	91–111	2–11	14,293
14	November 28	@ Minnesota Timberwolves	98–121	2–12	10,251
15	November 30	Chicago Bulls	88–94	2–13	19,193
16	December 1	@ Los Angeles Lakers	100–113	2–14	12,426
17	December 3	Milwaukee Bucks	95–109	2–15	14,149
18	December 5	@ Phoenix Suns	108–112	2–16	19,023
19	December 7	Detroit Pistons	84–93	2–17	14,685
20	December 10	Toronto Raptors	81–93	2–18	17,438
21	December 13	Houston Rockets	89–100	2–19	15,715
22	December 15	Portland Trail Blazers	104–100 (OT)	3–19	15,236
23	December 16	Golden State Warriors	85–116	3–20	15,539
24	December 18	@ Sacramento Kings	85–92	3–21	17,317
25	December 19	Seattle SuperSonics	94–93	4–21	16,701
26	December 21	@ Seattle SuperSonics	68–92	4–22	17,072
27	December 22	Phoenix Suns	80–101	4–23	17,636
28	December 26	@ Houston Rockets	84–100	4–24	16,285
29	December 28	@ Dallas Mavericks	101–103 (2OT)	4–25	17,502
30	December 30	Boston Celtics	103–95	5–25	19,193
31	January 5	Philadelphia 76ers	103–102 (OT)	6–25	17,870
32	January 7	Los Angeles Clippers	93–101	6–26	18,089
33	January 9	@ Golden State Warriors	103–109	6–27	15,025
34	January 10	Denver Nuggets	85–91	6–28	15,416
35	January 12	Golden State Warriors	95–104	6–29	16,581
36	January 13	Miami Heat	69–65	7–29	17,532
37	January 18	Cleveland Cavaliers	90–98	7–30	16,805
38	January 20	New York Knicks	84–80	8–30	19,193
39	January 22	@ Milwaukee Bucks	100–92	9–30	13,488
40	January 24	@ Chicago Bulls	84–104	9–31	23,652
41	January 25	@ Toronto Raptors	106–101 (OT)	10–31	21,378
42	January 27	@ Washington Bullets	77–102	10–32	18,756
43	January 29	@ Philadelphia 76ers	92–103	10–33	8,422
44	January 31	@ Boston Celtics	98–131	10–34	17,025
45	February 2	New Jersey Nets	84–93	10–35	16,141
46	February 5	Utah Jazz	83–92	10–36	15,827
47	February 7	@ Utah Jazz	79–102	10–37	19,911
48	February 14	Sacramento Kings	93–86	11–37	15,391
49	February 16	Atlanta Hawks	100–110	11–38	15,664
50	February 18	Seattle SuperSonics	109–118	11–39	19,193
51	February 19	@ Phoenix Suns	94–98 (OT)	11–40	19,023
52	February 25	San Antonio Spurs	84–95	11–41	16,598
53	February 28	Los Angeles Lakers	80–99	11–42	19,193
54	March 1	Dallas Mavericks	111–119	11–43	15,656
55	March 2	@ Denver Nuggets	82–108	11–44	15,832
56	March 4	Washington Bullets	81–96	11–45	15,996
57	March 5	@ Golden State Warriors	78–110	11–46	15,025
58	March 8	Indiana Pacers	80–94	11–47	16,451
59	March 10	Houston Rockets	89–95	11–48	19,193
60	March 11	@ Sacramento Kings	88–92	11–49	17,317
61	March 15	Orlando Magic	87–92 (OT)	11–50	19,193
62	March 17	@ Minnesota Timberwolves	85–90	11–51	12,228
63	March 19	@ New Jersey Nets	77–82	11–52	10,621
64	March 20	@ Atlanta Hawks	93–98	11–53	8,297
65	March 22	@ Indiana Pacers	94–111	11–54	16,715
66	March 24	@ Cleveland Cavaliers	85–90	11–55	18,108
67	March 26	@ Detroit Pistons	75–86	11–56	15,781
68	March 28	Denver Nuggets	88–92	11–57	16,889
69	March 29	@ Utah Jazz	91–105	11–58	19,911
70	March 31	Charlotte Hornets	88–121	11–59	18,147
71	April 2	@ Portland Trail Blazers	85–101	11–60	19,868
72	April 3	Minnesota Timberwolves	105–103	12–60	16,216
73	April 5	@ Los Angeles Lakers	94–104	12–61	17,505
74	April 7	Phoenix Suns	92–112	12–62	19,193
75	April 9	@ Houston Rockets	84–90	12–63	16,285
76	April 10	@ San Antonio Spurs	82–105	12–64	17,269
77	April 12	Sacramento Kings	99–98	13–64	18,619
78	April 14	Portland Trail Blazers	79–81	13–65	16,522
79	April 16	San Antonio Spurs	86–95	13–66	16,127
80	April 18	Utah Jazz	79–94	13–67	18,407
81	April 19	@ Denver Nuggets	92–78	14–67	15,119
82	April 21	@ Los Angeles Clippers	108–101	15–67	13,298

== Player statistics ==
=== Regular season ===
Player	POS	GP	GS	MP	REB	AST	STL	BLK	PTS	MPG	RPG	APG	SPG	BPG	PPG
Blue Edwards	SF	82	82	2,773	346	212	118	46	1,043	33.8	4.2	2.6	1.4	.6	12.7
Chris King	SF	80	66	1,930	285	104	68	33	634	24.1	3.6	1.3	.9	.4	7.9
Byron Scott	SG	80	0	1,894	192	123	63	22	819	23.7	2.4	1.5	.8	.3	10.2
Bryant Reeves	C	77	63	2,460	570	109	43	55	1,021	31.9	7.4	1.4	.6	.7	13.3
Anthony Avent	PF	71	32	1,586	355	69	30	42	415	22.3	5.0	1.0	.4	.6	5.8
Greg Anthony	PG	69	68	2,096	174	476	116	11	967	30.4	2.5	6.9	1.7	.2	14.0
Eric Murdock^{†}	PG	64	14	1,480	155	292	129	9	585	23.1	2.4	4.6	2.0	.1	9.1
Ashraf Amaya	PF	54	34	1,104	303	33	22	10	339	20.4	5.6	.6	.4	.2	6.3
Lawrence Moten	SG	44	3	573	61	50	29	8	291	13.0	1.4	1.1	.7	.2	6.6
Eric Mobley^{†}	C	34	1	611	128	22	13	23	182	18.0	3.8	.6	.4	.7	5.4
Doug Edwards	PF	31	0	519	87	39	10	18	93	16.7	2.8	1.3	.3	.6	3.0
Rich Manning	PF	29	0	311	55	7	3	6	107	10.7	1.9	.2	.1	.2	3.7
Gerald Wilkins	SG	28	14	738	65	68	22	2	188	26.4	2.3	2.4	.8	.1	6.7
Kenny Gattison	PF	25	14	570	114	14	10	11	229	22.8	4.6	.6	.4	.4	9.2
Darrick Martin^{†}	PG	24	0	402	38	61	27	1	161	16.8	1.6	2.5	1.1	.0	6.7
Antonio Harvey^{†}	PF	18	6	410	94	9	14	21	98	22.8	5.2	.5	.8	1.2	5.4
Benoit Benjamin^{†}	C	13	13	404	103	16	10	15	181	31.1	7.9	1.2	.8	1.2	13.9
Cuonzo Martin	SG	4	0	19	2	2	1	0	9	4.8	.5	.5	.3	.0	2.3

- ^{†} Denotes player spent time with another team in the season. Stats reflect time with the Grizzlies only.

== Franchise firsts ==
On opening night, the Grizzlies would spoil the Portland Trail Blazers debut at the Rose Garden Arena by defeating them. A few nights later, the Grizzlies would play their first home game, defeating the Minnesota Timberwolves at the buzzer.

== Awards and records ==
- Bryant Reeves, Second Team, NBA All-Rookie Team
