= 2018 Vancouver International Film Festival =

Vancouver International Film Festival
- Opening film: The Hummingbird Project by Kim Nguyen
- Closing film: The Front Runner by Jason Reitman
- Location: Vancouver, British Columbia, Canada
- Festival date: September 27 – October 12, 2018

The 2018 Vancouver International Film Festival (VIFF) took place from September 27 to October 12, 2018.

== Awards ==
The festival award winners were announced on October 12.

Award	Film	Director
People's Choice	Finding Big Country	Kathleen Jayme
Most Popular Canadian Feature	Edge of the Knife	Gwaai Edenshaw and Helen Haig-Brown
Most Popular International Feature	Shoplifters	Hirokazu Kore-eda
Most Popular International Documentary	Bathtubs Over Broadway	Dava Whisenant
Best Canadian Film	Edge of the Knife	Gwaai Edenshaw and Helen Haig-Brown
Best Canadian Film, Honorable Mention	Genesis (Genèse)	Philippe Lesage
Best Canadian Film, Honorable Mention	The Grizzlies	Miranda de Pencier
Best Canadian Documentary	The Museum of Forgotten Triumphs	Bojan Bodružić
Best Canadian Documentary, Honorable Mention	A Sister's Song	Danae Elon
Best Canadian Short Film	Fauve	Jérémy Comte
Emerging Canadian Director	When the Storm Fades	Seán Devlin
Emerging Canadian Director, Honorable Mention	M/M	Drew Lint
Most Promising Canadian Director of a Short Film	EXIT	Claire Edmondson
Best BC Film	Edge of the Knife	Gwaai Edenshaw and Helen Haig-Brown
Sea to Sky Award	Broken Bunny	Meredith Hama-Brown
Sea to Sky Award, Honorable Mention	Anthem of a Teenage Prophet	Robin Hays
BC Emerging Filmmaker	Freaks	Zach Lipovsky and Adam Stein
Best BC Short Film	Biidaaban (The Dawn Comes)	Amanda Strong
VIFF Impact Award	The Devil We Know	Stephanie Soechtig
Daily Hive #mustseeBC	Finding Big Country	Kathleen Jayme

== Programmes ==
=== Galas ===
- The Hummingbird Project — Kim Nguyen (Opening)
- The Front Runner — Jason Reitman (Closing)

=== Special Presentations ===
- Anthropocene: The Human Epoch — Jennifer Baichwal, Nicholas de Pencier, Edward Burtynsky
- Boy Erased — Joel Edgerton
- Can You Ever Forgive Me? — Marielle Heller
- Cold War — Paweł Pawlikowski
- Colette — Wash Westmoreland
- Everybody Knows — Asghar Farhadi
- The Favourite — Yorgos Lanthimos
- The Grizzlies — Miranda de Pencier
- The Happy Prince — Rupert Everett
- Non-Fiction — Olivier Assayas
- The Old Man and the Gun — David Lowery
- A Private War — Matthew Heineman
- Shadow — Zhang Yimou
- Sharkwater Extinction — Rob Stewart
- Shoplifters — Hirokazu Kore-eda
- The Sisters Brothers — Jacques Audiard

=== Special Events ===
- VIFF Trbute Award: Jean-Marc Vallée, with screening of Dallas Buyers Club
- An Evening with Jane Goodall, with screening of Jane
- Bethune: The Making of a Hero — Phillip Borsos

=== ALT ===
- Another Day of Life — Raúl de la Fuente, Damian Nenow
- Climax — Gaspar Noé
- The House That Jack Built — Lars von Trier
- Level 16 — Danishka Esterhazy
- Mega Time Squad — Tim Van Dammen
- One Cut of the Dead — Shin'ichirô Ueda
- Parallel — Isaac Ezban
- Profile — Timur Bekmambetov
- Relaxer — Joel Potrykus
- Ruben Brandt, Collector — Milorad Krstić
- Seder-Masochism — Nina Paley
- Under the Silver Lake — David Robert Mitchell
- Virus Tropical — Santiago Caicedo
- The Wolf House — Cristobal León & Joaquín Cociña

=== Modes ===
- Hi I Need to Be Loved — Marnie Ellen Hertzler
- The Hymns of Muscovy — Dimitri Venkov
- Julio Iglesias's House — Natalia Marin
- LHB — Charlotte Prodger
- Lost Head & the Bird — Sohrab Hura
- The Rare Event — Ben Rivers, Ben Russell
- A Room with a Coconut View — Tulapop Saenjaroen
- Unearthing. In Conversation — Belinda Kazeem-Kaminski
- The White Elephant — Shuruq Harb

=== Gateway ===
- 14 Apples — Midi Z
- Ala Changso — Sonthar Gyal
- Asako I & II — Ryūsuke Hamaguchi
- Ash Is Purest White — Jia Zhangke
- Burning — Lee Chang-dong
- An Elephant Sitting Still — Hu Bo
- A Family Tour — Ying Liang
- Father to Son — Hsiao Ya-Chuan
- Girls Always Happy — Yang Mingming
- Grass — Hong Sang-soo
- It's Boring Here, Pick Me Up — Ryuichi Hiroki
- Jinpa — Pema Tseden
- A Land Imagined — Yeo Siew Hua
- Long Day's Journey Into Night — Bi Gan
- Lush Reeds — Yang Yishu
- Manta Ray — Phuttiphong Aroonpheng
- Microhabitat — Jeon Go-woon
- Mirai — Mamoru Hosoda
- Mori, The Artist's Habitat — Shuichi Okita
- Nervous Translation — Shireen Seno
- No. 1 Chung Ying Street — Derek Chiu
- People's Republic of Desire — Hao Wu
- The Running Actress — Moon So-ri
- The Scythian Lamb — Daihachi Yoshida
- The Seen and Unseen — Kamila Andini
- The Third Wife — Ash Mayfair
- Wangdrak's Rain Boots — Lhapal Gyal

=== Impact ===
- Central Airport THF by Karim Aïnouz
- Chris the Swiss by Anja Kofmel
- Cuban Food Stories by Asori Soto
- Dawnland by Adam Mazo, Ben Pender-Cudlip
- The Devil We Know by Stephanie Soechtig
- The Distant Barking of Dogs by Simon Lereng Wilmont
- Dolphin Man: The Story of Jacques Mayol by Lefteris Charitos
- Dreaming Under Capitalism by Sophie Bruneau
- Eldorado by Markus Imhoof
- The Image You Missed by Donal Foreman
- In My Room by Ayelet Albenda
- Inside My Heart by Debra Kellner
- Jane by Brett Morgen
- John McEnroe: In the Realm of Perfection by Julien Faraut
- The Lost City of the Monkey God by Bill Benenson
- The Oslo Diaries by Mor Loushy, Daniel Sivan
- Piazza Vittorio by Abel Ferrara
- Putin's Witnesses by Vitaly Mansky
- Samouni Road by Stefano Savona
- The Serengeti Rules by Nicolas Brown
- Shirkers by Sandi Tan
- The Silence of Others by Almudena Carracedo, Robert Bahar
- Theatre of War by Lola Arias
- The Washing Society by Lizzie Olesker, Lynne Sachs
- What Comes Around by Reem Saleh
- Wine Calling by Bruno Sauvard

=== M/A/D ===
- Bathtubs Over Broadway by Dava Whisenant
- Bergman - A Year in a Life by Jane Magnusson
- Blue Note Records: Beyond the Notes by Sophie Huber
- Carmine Street Guitars by Ron Mann
- The Eyes of Orson Welles by Mark Cousins
- Garry Winogrand: All Things Are Photographable by Sasha Waters Freyer
- Impulso by Emilio Belmonte
- Jamilia by Aminatou Echard
- Le Grand Bal by Laetitia Carton
- The Man Who Stole Banksy by Marco Proserpio
- Maria by Callas by Tom Volf
- Matangi/Maya/M.I.A. by Stephen Loveridge
- Minute Bodies: The Intimate Lives of F. Percy Smith by Stuart A. Staples
- O Horizon by The Otolith Group
- The Price of Everything by Nathaniel Kahn
- The Proposal by Jill Magid
- United Skates by Dyana Winkler, Tina Brown
- The Whistleblower of My Lai by Connie Field
- Yellow Is Forbidden by Pietra Brettkelly

=== Contemporary World Cinema ===
- 3 Faces — Jafar Panahi
- Ága — Milko Lazarov
- All Good (Alles ist gut) — Eva Trobisch
- Amateurs (Amatörer) — Gabriela Pichler
- Ben Is Back — Peter Hedges
- Barefoot (Po strništi bos) — Jan Svěrák
- Becoming Astrid (Unga Astrid) — Pernille Fischer Christensen
- Bel Canto — Paul Weitz
- Birds of Passage — Ciro Guerra, Cristina Gallego
- Capernaum — Nadine Labaki
- Carmen & Lola (Carmen y Lola) — Arantxa Echevarría
- The Dead and the Others — João Salaviza, Renée Nader Messora
- Dear Son — Mohamed Ben Attia
- Diamantino — Gabriel Abrantes, Daniel Schmidt
- Diane — Kent Jones
- Djon Africa — Filipa Reis, João Miller Guerra
- Dovlatov — Aleksei German
- Dressage — Pooya Badkoobeh
- Fugue — Agnieszka Smoczyńska
- Garden Store: Suitor — Jan Hřebejk
- The Guilty — Gustav Möller
- Hat-Trick — Ramtin Lavafi
- The Heiresses — Marcelo Martinessi
- Hendi and Hormoz — Abbas Amini
- Holiday — Isabella Eklöf
- In My Room — Ulrich Köhler
- In the Aisles — Thomas Stuber
- In the Shadows — Dipesh Jain
- Jonathan — Bill Oliver
- Last Summer — Jon Jones
- Leto — Kirill Serebrennikov
- Liquid Truth — Carolina Jabor
- The Load — Ognjen Glavonić
- Mug — Małgorzata Szumowska
- No One Will Ever Know — Jesús Torres Torres
- Patrimony — Jiří Vejdělek
- Petra — Jaime Rosales
- Pity — Babis Makridis
- The Reports on Sarah and Saleem — Muayad Alayan
- Shock Waves — Ursula Meier, Lionel Baier, Frédéric Mermoud, Jean-Stéphane Bron
- Sir — Rohena Gera
- The Snatch Thief — Agustin Toscano
- Sofia — Meryem Benm'Barek-Aloïsi
- Styx — Wolfgang Fischer
- Transit — Christian Petzold
- Volcano — Roman Bondarchuk
- What They Had — Elizabeth Chomko
- The Wild Pear Tree — Nuri Bilge Ceylan
- Winter Flies — Olmo Omerzu
- Woman at War — Benedikt Erlingsson
- Working Woman — Michal Aviad
- Yomeddine — Abu Bakr Shawky

=== Spotlight on France ===
- At War (En guerre) — Stéphane Brizé
- Coincoin and the Extra-Humans (Coincoin et les z'inhumains) — Bruno Dumont
- The Image Book (Le Livre d'image) — Jean-Luc Godard
- Keep an Eye Out (Au poste!) — Quentin Dupieux
- Memoir of War (La douleur) — Emmanuel Finkiel
- A Paris Education (Mes provinciales) — Jean-Paul Civeyrac
- The Prayer (La prière) — Cédric Kahn
- Shéhérazade — Jean-Bernard Marlin
- Sorry Angel (Plaire, aimer et courir vite) — Christophe Honoré

=== Focus on Italy ===
- Daughter of Mine (Figlia mia) — Laura Bispuri
- Dogman — Matteo Garrone
- Euphoria (Euforia) — Valeria Golino
- Happy as Lazzaro (Lazzaro felice) — Alice Rohrwacher
- Love and Bullets (Ammore e malavita) — Manetti Bros.
- A Woman's Name (Nome di donna) — Marco Tullio Giordana
- Piazza Vittorio — Abel Ferrara
- Sicilian Ghost Story — Fabio Grassadonia, Antonio Piazza

=== Vanguard ===
- Communion Los Angeles — Adam R. Levine, Peter Bo Rappmund
- The Flower (La Flor) — Mariano Llinás
- The Grand Bizarre — Jodie Mack
- Introduzione all'oscuro — Gastón Solnicki
- Notes on an Appearance — Ricky D'Ambrose
- Quantification Trilogy — Jeremy Shaw
- Ray & Liz — Richard Billingham
- What You Gonna Do When the World's on Fire? — Roberto Minervini

=== Sea to Sky ===
- Anthem of a Teenage Prophet — Robin Hays
- Because We Are Girls — Baljit Sangra
- The Darling — Lee Seung-Yup
- Edge of the Knife — Gwaai Edenshaw, Helen Haig-Brown
- Finding Big Country — Kathleen Jayme
- Freaks — Zach Lipovsky and Adam Stein
- In the Valley of Wild Horses — Trevor Mack, Asia Youngman
- Kingsway — Bruce Sweeney
- N.O.N. — Zebulon Zang
- Picking Up the Pieces: The Making of the Witness Blanket — Cody Graham and Carey Newman
- This Mountain Life — Grant Baldwin
- When the Storm Fades — Seán Devlin

=== True North ===
- Clara — Akash Sherman
- Everything Outside — David Findlay
- The Far Shore — Joyce Wieland
- Firecrackers — Jasmin Mozaffari
- Genesis (Genèse) — Philippe Lesage
- Giant Little Ones — Keith Behrman
- Mouthpiece — Patricia Rozema
- The New Romantic — Carly Stone
- Quiet Killing — Kim O'Bomsawin
- Roads in February (Les routes en février) — Katherine Jerkovic
- A Sister's Song — Danae Elon
- Splinters — Thom Fitzgerald
- Through Black Spruce — Don McKellar
- Ville Neuve — Félix Dufour-Laperrière
- What Is Democracy? — Astra Taylor
- What Walaa Wants — Christy Garland

=== Future//Present ===
- Fausto by Andrea Bussmann
- M/M by Drew Lint
- Mangoshake by Terry Chiu
- The Museum of Forgotten Triumphs — Bojan Bodružić
- Song of a Seer — Aïda Maigre-Touchet
- Spice It Up — Lev Lewis, Yonah Lewis, Calvin Thomas
- The Stone Speakers — Igor Drljaca
- Waiting for April — Olivier Godin

=== Canadian Short Films ===
- 7A — Zack Russell
- Acres — Rebeccah Love
- Animal Behaviour — Alison Snowden, David Fine
- Best Friends Read the Same Books — Matthew Taylor Blais
- Biidaaban (The Dawn Comes) — Amanda Strong
- Broken Bunny — Meredith Hama-Brown
- La Cartographe — Nathan Douglas
- Century — Levi Holwell, Gabe Romero
- Compete — Emmanuelle Lacombe
- A Dreaming House — Devin Shears
- Encore — Connor Gaston, Vaughn Gaston
- EXIT — Claire Edmondson
- Fauve — Jérémy Comte
- From Across the Street and Through Two Sets of Windows — Steven McCarthy
- Girl on a Bus — Matthew B. Schmidt
- Glitter's Wild Woman — Danielle Roney
- Guts — Nano Clow
- Haus — Joseph Amenta
- Hazel Isle — Jessica Johnson
- Hole — G. Goletski
- Loretta's Flowers — Brendan Prost
- The Lure of the Deep — Larissa Corriveau
- Mahalia Melts in the Rain — Émilie Mannering
- Medical Drama — Sophie Jarvis
- My Life Is a Joke — Chelsea McMullan, Sarafina Difelice
- Paddock — Michel Kandinsky
- Paseo — Matthew Hannam
- Prawn — Andrew Gillingham
- Pumpkin Movie — Sophy Romvari
- The Subject — Patrick Bouchard
- Titanyum — Gökçe Erdem
- Train Hopper — Amélie Hardy
- Turbine — Alex Boya
- Under the Viaduct — Norm Li
- The Urge to Run a Lap — Lesley Loksi Chan
- Veslemøy's Song — Sofia Bohdanowicz
- Woman in Stall — Madeleine Sims-Fewer, Dusty Mancinelli

=== International Shorts ===
- Akeda (The Binding) — Dan Bronfeld
- Anointed — Dan Lin
- Aquarium — Lorenzo Puntoni
- The Beetle at the End of the Street — Joan Vives Lozano
- Bodies — Laura Nagy
- Boy Saint — Tom Speers
- Coming of Age — Doug Tompos
- Dawn — Jörn Threlfall
- Eli — Colin Gerrard
- Exit Toll — Mohammad Najarian Dariani
- First Generation — Jeannie Nguyen
- Gerry — Victoria Hollup, Paul Agar
- Green — Suzanne Andrew Correa
- Hard Rubbish — Stephen Packer
- In Lucia's Skin — Marya Hermosillo, Angel De Guillermo
- The Light Refracts Into the Shadows — Tsung Hsuan Yeh
- Mamartuile — Alejandro Saevich
- Matria — Alvaro Gago
- Mino Bimaadiziwin — Shane McSauby
- Open House — Philip Aceto
- Open Your Eyes — Ilay Mevorach
- Password: Fajara — Séverine Sajous, Patricia Sanchez Mora
- A Picnic Table at Dusk — Sheridan O'Donnell
- Precious — Mohammed Hammad
- The Racer — Alex Harron
- Seen from Above — Patrick Brooks
- Shadow Animals — Jerry Carlsson
- Skates — Maddelin McKenna
- Sorceress — Max Blustin
- Theo & Celeste — Hanna Dougherty
- Trophy Boy — Emrhys Cooper
- Yesterday or the Day Before — Hugo Sanz
- You Don't Know Me — Rodrigo Sellos

=== Youth Shorts ===
- Big Girls Don't Cry — Rebecca Shapass
- The Bunny Odyssey — Taerang Yun
- Foreign — Timothy Ross
- Gary, Mary, Barry and Craig — Carissa Clarkson, Rani Li, Ben Cockell, Sylvie Hopkins, Owen Liu
- Gift — Yohann Grignou
- Gone Astray — Mabel Ye
- If Teardrops Were Pennies — Tiana Bates, Alexandria Sayers
- iRony — Radheya Jegatheva
- Jasmine Stung — Partho Gupte
- Little Jerusalem — Monika Navickaite
- Matriarch Rising — Helen Motts Tommy, Savannah M., Kelly Yellowbird, Shaina W. and Jenna Quock
- My Clayey Conception — Zanyar Muhammadineko
- Pulse — Gage Oxley
- Rami & Mohammed's Story — Khaled Ahmed, Mohamed B., Rami Al Mitwali, Fouad Hammoud
- Replica — Han Pham
- Slurp — Anya Martin
- Somethings — Shira Haimovici
- Squats — Karina Jesson
- Urban Poetry — Anton Guttenberg

=== Shorts airing with features ===
- ante mis ojos — Lina Rodriguez
- Carlotta's Face — Valentin Riedl
- Caterpillarplasty — David Barlow-Krelina
- A Fortress — Miryam Charles
- The Great Wall of China — Aleksandra Odic
- The Harvesters — Derek Howard
- Holy Angels — Jay Cardinal Villeneuve
- In the Valley of the Wild Horses — Trevor Mack, Asia Youngman
- Roy Thomson — Sofia Bohdanowicz
- The Soft Space — Sofia Bohdanowicz, Melanie Scheiner
- Three Atlas — Miryam Charles
- Where — Sofia Bohdanowicz
