= 1996–97 Vancouver Grizzlies season =

- Head coach: Brian Winters (8–35) (fired); Stu Jackson (6–33)
- General manager: Stu Jackson
- Owners: Arthur Griffiths
- Arena: General Motors Place

Results
- Record: 14–68 (.171)
- Place: Division: 7th (Midwest); Conference: 14th (Western)
- Playoff finish: Did not qualify
- Stats at Basketball Reference

Local media
- Television: BCTV; Showcase
- Radio: CKNW

The 1996–97 Vancouver Grizzlies season was the second season for the Vancouver Grizzlies in the National Basketball Association.

== Season summary ==
=== Off-season ===
Coming off of finishing with a league-worst 15–67 record in their inaugural season, the Grizzlies received the third overall pick in the 1996 NBA draft, and selected small forward Shareef Abdur-Rahim from the University of California; the team also selected power forward Roy Rogers from the University of Alabama with the 22nd overall pick. During the off-season, the Grizzlies acquired Anthony Peeler and George Lynch from the Los Angeles Lakers, and signed free agents Lee Mayberry and Pete Chilcutt.

=== Regular season ===
However, despite the addition of Abdur-Rahim, Peeler, Lynch and Rogers, the Grizzlies continued to struggle in their second season, losing their first seven games of the regular season, and then later on posting an eight-game losing streak in January. Head coach Brian Winters was fired after an 8–35 start to the season, and was replaced with General Manager Stu Jackson as an interim coach. Under Jackson, the Grizzlies held a 9–42 record at the All-Star break, suffered a 15-game losing streak between February and March, and then posted a nine-game losing streak between March and April, finishing in last place in the Midwest Division with a league-worst 14–68 record, which was their worst record in franchise history.

Abdur-Rahim averaged 18.7 points and 6.9 rebounds per game, and was named to the NBA All-Rookie First Team, while second-year star Bryant Reeves showed improvement averaging 16.2 points and 8.1 rebounds per game, and Peeler provided the team with 14.5 points, 3.6 assists and 1.5 steals per game, and led them with 128 three-point field goals. In addition, Greg Anthony contributed 9.5 points, 6.3 assists and 2.0 steals per game, while Lynch provided with 8.3 points, 6.4 rebounds and 1.5 steals per game, but only played just 41 games due to an abdominal strain injury, and Blue Edwards provided with 7.8 points per game. Meanwhile second-year guard Lawrence Moten contributed 6.7 points per game, Rogers averaged 6.6 points, 4.7 rebounds and 2.0 blocks per game, Mayberry provided with 5.1 points and 4.1 assists per game, and rookie shooting guard, and second-round draft pick Chris Robinson contributed 4.6 points per game.

During the NBA All-Star weekend at the Gund Arena in Cleveland, Ohio, Abdur-Rahim and Rogers were both selected for the NBA Rookie Game, as members of the Western Conference Rookie team. Abdur-Rahim scored 17 points despite the Western Conference losing to the Eastern Conference, 96–91. Abdur-Rahim also finished in third place in Rookie of the Year voting. The Grizzlies finished 17th in the NBA in home-game attendance, with an attendance of 683,442 at General Motors Place during the regular season.

=== Aftermath ===
Following the season, Anthony signed as a free agent with the Seattle SuperSonics, while Jackson was fired as head coach, Rogers was traded to the Boston Celtics, and Moten and Eric Mobley were both released to free agency.

== Draft picks ==
The Grizzlies first draft pick was Shareef Abdur-Rahim, which was the third overall pick in the draft.

Round	Pick	Player	Position	Nationality	College
1	3	Shareef Abdur-Rahim	Forward	United States	University of California
1	22	Roy Rogers	Forward	United States	University of Alabama
2	51	Chris Robinson	Guard	United States	Western Kentucky University

== Roster ==
1996–97 Vancouver Grizzlies roster
Players

Pos.	No.	Player	Height	Weight	DOB	From
F	3	Shareef Abdur-Rahim	6 ft 9 in (2.06 m)	225 lb (102 kg)	––	California
G	2	Greg Anthony	6 ft 0 in (1.83 m)	176 lb (80 kg)	––	UNLV
F	33	Pete Chilcutt	6 ft 10 in (2.08 m)	230 lb (104 kg)	––	North Carolina
G/F	30	Blue Edwards	6 ft 4 in (1.93 m)	200 lb (91 kg)	––	East Carolina
F	32	Doug Edwards (injured) (IN)	6 ft 7 in (2.01 m)	220 lb (100 kg)	––	Florida State
C	55	Eric Leckner	6 ft 11 in (2.11 m)	265 lb (120 kg)	––	Wyoming
F	34	George Lynch (injured)	6 ft 8 in (2.03 m)	218 lb (99 kg)	––	North Carolina
G	11	Lee Mayberry	6 ft 1 in (1.85 m)	172 lb (78 kg)	––	Arkansas
C	52	Eric Mobley (injured)	6 ft 11 in (2.11 m)	235 lb (107 kg)	––	Pittsburgh
G	21	Lawrence Moten	6 ft 5 in (1.96 m)	185 lb (84 kg)	––	Syracuse
G	7	Anthony Peeler	6 ft 4 in (1.93 m)	208 lb (94 kg)	––	Missouri
C	50	Bryant Reeves	7 ft 0 in (2.13 m)	290 lb (132 kg)	––	Oklahoma State
G	5	Chris Robinson	6 ft 5 in (1.96 m)	200 lb (91 kg)	––	Western Kentucky
F	44	Roy Rogers	6 ft 10 in (2.08 m)	235 lb (107 kg)	––	Alabama
F	15	Aaron Williams	6 ft 9 in (2.06 m)	220 lb (100 kg)	––	Xavier

Coaches
Head coach
- Stu Jackson
Assistant(s)
- Lionel Hollins
- Rex Hughes
- Jimmy Powell

Legend
- (DP) Unsigned draft pick
- (FA) Free agent
- (S) Suspended
- (IN) Inactive
- Injured

Roster

=== Roster notes ===
- Small forward Doug Edwards was on the injured reserve list due to compartment syndrome in both legs, and missed the entire regular season.

== Regular season ==
The Grizzlies would open the season with a seven-game losing streak before earning their first win, as they defeated the Phoenix Suns 92–89 in their eighth game. Wins would be few and far between for Vancouver, as they finished the season with a 14–68 record, which was one game worse than their expansion season. The Grizzlies also once again finished in last place in the league.

=== Highs ===
- The Grizzlies swept a season series for the first time in team history, as they won both of their games against the Boston Celtics. The win against the Celtics was also the only time the Grizzlies won consecutive games during the season, as they defeated the San Antonio Spurs the previous game.
- Vancouver scored a season high 121 points in their final game of the season, as they defeated the Phoenix Suns 121–107.

=== Lows ===
- The Grizzlies lose their first seven games of the season, including a double OT loss to the Los Angeles Clippers in their seventh game.
- Vancouver gives up a season high 127 points in a 127–80 loss to the Indiana Pacers on December 4, 1996.
- After a 95–76 loss against the Minnesota Timberwolves on January 23, 1997, Vancouver fires head coach Brian Winters and general manager Stu Jackson takes over for the remainder of the season.
- On March 19, 1997, the Grizzlies lose their season high fifteenth straight game, as the Minnesota Timberwolves defeat Vancouver 95–72.

=== Season standings ===
Midwest Division	W	L	PCT	GB	Home	Road	Div
y-Utah Jazz	64	18	.780	–	38–3	26–15	19–5
x-Houston Rockets	57	25	.695	7	30–11	27–14	19–5
x-Minnesota Timberwolves	40	42	.488	24	25–16	15–26	16–8
Dallas Mavericks	24	58	.293	40	14–27	10–31	9–15
Denver Nuggets	21	61	.256	43	12–29	9–32	7–17
San Antonio Spurs	20	62	.244	44	12–29	8–33	8–16
Vancouver Grizzlies	14	68	.171	50	8–33	6–35	6–18

1996–97 NBA West standings
#	Western Conference				
#	Team	W	L	PCT	GB
1	c-Utah Jazz	64	18	.780	–
2	y-Seattle SuperSonics	57	25	.695	7
3	x-Houston Rockets	57	25	.695	7
4	x-Los Angeles Lakers	56	26	.683	8
5	x-Portland Trail Blazers	49	33	.598	15
6	x-Minnesota Timberwolves	40	42	.488	24
7	x-Phoenix Suns	40	42	.488	24
8	x-Los Angeles Clippers	36	46	.439	28
9	Sacramento Kings	34	48	.415	30
10	Golden State Warriors	30	52	.366	34
11	Dallas Mavericks	24	58	.293	40
12	Denver Nuggets	21	61	.256	43
13	San Antonio Spurs	20	62	.244	44
14	Vancouver Grizzlies	14	68	.171	50

=== Game log ===
#	Date	Opponent	Score	Record	Attendance
1	November 1	Portland Trail Blazers	85–114	0–1	19,193
2	November 3	Golden State Warriors	95–105	0–2	15,781
3	November 5	@ Chicago Bulls	73–96	0–3	23,726
4	November 6	@ Milwaukee Bucks	89–105	0–4	13,689
5	November 8	@ Cleveland Cavaliers	72–88	0–5	13,691
6	November 10	New York Knicks	82–101	0–6	17,356
7	November 12	Los Angeles Clippers	92–99 (2OT)	0–7	14,259
8	November 14	Phoenix Suns	92–89	1–7	15,158
9	November 15	@ Utah Jazz	96–104	1–8	19,046
10	November 17	@ Seattle SuperSonics	81–91	1–9	17,072
11	November 18	Sacramento Kings	83–84	1–10	14,672
12	November 20	Miami Heat	75–94	1–11	15,054
13	November 24	San Antonio Spurs	96–91	2–11	15,874
14	November 26	@ Atlanta Hawks	80–101	2–12	6,957
15	November 27	@ Detroit Pistons	78–87	2–13	15,195
16	November 29	@ Indiana Pacers	94–104	2–14	15,488
17	November 30	@ Philadelphia 76ers	90–96	2–15	13,038
18	December 3	Indiana Pacers	80–127	2–16	15,699
19	December 6	@ San Antonio Spurs	105–89	3–16	13,646
20	December 7	@ Dallas Mavericks	85–96	3–17	15,102
21	December 9	Charlotte Hornets	91–107	3–18	15,780
22	December 12	@ Portland Trail Blazers	78–99	3–19	20,042
23	December 13	Orlando Magic	95–93	4–19	15,954
24	December 15	@ Phoenix Suns	84–103	4–20	19,023
25	December 17	Houston Rockets	93–92	5–20	16,205
26	December 19	Dallas Mavericks	98–105	5–21	15,049
27	December 20	@ Denver Nuggets	93–108	5–22	10,020
28	December 22	Washington Bullets	91–87	6–22	15,751
29	December 26	@ Sacramento Kings	88–111	6–23	17,317
30	December 28	Phoenix Suns	98–103	6–24	16,757
31	December 30	San Antonio Spurs	88–95	6–25	15,749
32	January 3	Seattle SuperSonics	94–108	6–26	19,193
33	January 5	Los Angeles Lakers	82–95	6–27	19,193
34	January 8	@ Golden State Warriors	109–95	7–27	12,819
35	January 9	Golden State Warriors	86–104	7–28	15,454
36	January 11	Sacramento Kings	101–109	7–29	16,092
37	January 14	@ Los Angeles Lakers	81–91	7–30	15,606
38	January 15	Detroit Pistons	79–103	7–31	16,059
39	January 17	Utah Jazz	68–106	7–32	15,173
40	January 19	Toronto Raptors	100–92	8–32	17,474
41	January 20	@ Seattle SuperSonics	96–112	8–33	17,072
42	January 22	@ Denver Nuggets	84–94	8–34	8,422
43	January 23	Minnesota Timberwolves	76–95	8–35	15,282
44	January 25	Denver Nuggets	82–83	8–36	17,102
45	January 27	@ Golden State Warriors	97–122	8–37	12,839
46	January 28	Chicago Bulls	96–111	8–38	19,193
47	January 30	@ Los Angeles Clippers	94–100	8–39	5,122
48	January 31	Atlanta Hawks	76–87	8–40	15,205
49	February 2	@ Boston Celtics	102–92	9–40	15,737
50	February 4	@ New Jersey Nets	105–111	9–41	10,990
51	February 6	@ Minnesota Timberwolves	86–103	9–42	14,277
52	February 11	@ Houston Rockets	97–106	9–43	16,285
53	February 12	@ San Antonio Spurs	106–101	10–43	12,463
54	February 14	Boston Celtics	109–106	11–43	17,434
55	February 17	Dallas Mavericks	95–100	11–44	15,540
56	February 19	Minnesota Timberwolves	73–84	11–45	15,729
57	February 21	@ Los Angeles Lakers	91–99	11–46	17,031
58	February 23	Cleveland Cavaliers	84–91	11–47	15,536
59	February 26	Los Angeles Clippers	80–83	11–48	15,619
60	February 28	Philadelphia 76ers	100–104	11–49	17,463
61	March 2	Utah Jazz	86–93	11–50	16,415
62	March 6	New Jersey Nets	96–102	11–51	16,673
63	March 9	@ Toronto Raptors	77–81	11–52	19,186
64	March 11	@ Charlotte Hornets	92–98	11–53	24,042
65	March 12	@ Washington Bullets	82–104	11–54	11,007
66	March 14	@ Miami Heat	82–88	11–55	14,728
67	March 16	@ Orlando Magic	89–100	11–56	17,248
68	March 18	@ New York Knicks	73–98	11–57	19,763
69	March 19	@ Minnesota Timberwolves	72–95	11–58	13,368
70	March 21	Denver Nuggets	108–101	12–58	19,193
71	March 23	Seattle SuperSonics	92–106	12–59	17,645
72	March 25	@ Los Angeles Clippers	104–110 (OT)	12–60	5,528
73	March 27	Los Angeles Lakers	98–102 (OT)	12–61	18,722
74	March 28	@ Portland Trail Blazers	81–115	12–62	20,865
75	April 1	Milwaukee Bucks	91–102	12–63	17,193
76	April 4	@ Utah Jazz	79–106	12–64	19,911
77	April 6	Houston Rockets	85–94	12–65	17,356
78	April 8	@ Sacramento Kings	93–109	12–66	17,317
79	April 10	@ Houston Rockets	94–102	12–67	16,285
80	April 12	@ Dallas Mavericks	96–85	13–67	14,060
81	April 17	Portland Trail Blazers	73–105	13–68	19,193
82	April 19	@ Phoenix Suns	121–107	14–68	19,023

== Player statistics ==
=== Ragular season ===
Player	POS	GP	GS	MP	REB	AST	STL	BLK	PTS	MPG	RPG	APG	SPG	BPG	PPG
Roy Rogers	PF	82	50	1,848	386	46	21	163	543	22.5	4.7	.6	.3	2.0	6.6
Shareef Abdur-Rahim	PF	80	71	2,802	555	175	79	79	1,494	35.0	6.9	2.2	1.0	1.0	18.7
Lee Mayberry	PG	80	38	1,952	134	329	60	8	410	24.4	1.7	4.1	.8	.1	5.1
Bryant Reeves	C	75	75	2,777	610	160	29	67	1,213	37.0	8.1	2.1	.4	.9	16.2
Anthony Peeler	SG	72	57	2,291	247	256	105	17	1,041	31.8	3.4	3.6	1.5	.2	14.5
Lawrence Moten	SG	67	18	1,214	119	129	48	24	447	18.1	1.8	1.9	.7	.4	6.7
Greg Anthony	PG	65	44	1,863	184	407	129	4	616	28.7	2.8	6.3	2.0	.1	9.5
Blue Edwards	SF	61	12	1,439	189	114	38	20	478	23.6	3.1	1.9	.6	.3	7.8
Pete Chilcutt	PF	54	1	662	156	47	26	17	182	12.3	2.9	.9	.5	.3	3.4
George Lynch	SF	41	27	1,059	261	76	63	17	342	25.8	6.4	1.9	1.5	.4	8.3
Chris Robinson	SG	41	6	681	71	65	28	9	188	16.6	1.7	1.6	.7	.2	4.6
Aaron Williams^{†}	PF	32	1	553	138	15	16	26	197	17.3	4.3	.5	.5	.8	6.2
Eric Mobley	C	28	8	307	58	14	5	10	72	11.0	2.1	.5	.2	.4	2.6
Eric Leckner^{†}	C	19	1	115	35	4	3	2	34	6.1	1.8	.2	.2	.1	1.8
Rich Manning^{†}	PF	16	1	128	23	2	3	1	44	8.0	1.4	.1	.2	.1	2.8
Moochie Norris	PG	8	0	89	12	23	4	0	12	11.1	1.5	2.9	.5	.0	1.5

- ^{†} Denotes player spent time with another team in the season. Stats reflect time with the Grizzlies only.

== Awards and records ==
- Shareef Abdur-Rahim, First Team, NBA All-Rookie Team

== Transactions ==
Vancouver would make a trade with the Los Angeles Lakers, as the Grizzlies would acquire Anthony Peeler and George Lynch along with the Lakers second round draft choices in 1997 and 1998 for Vancouver's second round draft choices in 1997 and 1998. Peeler would start 57 games for the Grizzlies in the 1996–97 season and finish third in team scoring averaging 14.5 points per game.
