= Shareef Abdur-Rahim =

American basketball player (born 1976)

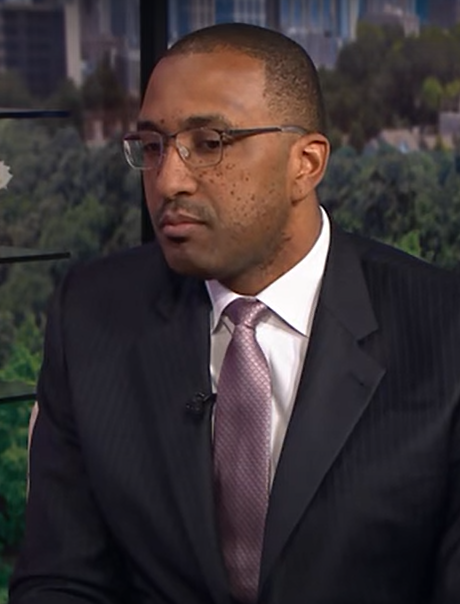
- Abdur-Rahim on Sister Circle in 2019

Personal information
- Born: December 11, 1976 (age 49) Marietta, Georgia, U.S.
- Listed height: 6 ft 9 in (2.06 m)
- Listed weight: 245 lb (111 kg)

Career information
- High school: Joseph Wheeler (Marietta, Georgia)
- College: California (1995–1996)
- NBA draft: 1996: 1st round, 3rd overall pick
- Drafted by: Vancouver Grizzlies
- Playing career: 1996–2008
- Position: Power forward / small forward
- Number: 3, 33
- Coaching career: 2008–2010

Career history

Playing
- 1996–2001: Vancouver Grizzlies
- 2001–2004: Atlanta Hawks
- 2004–2005: Portland Trail Blazers
- 2005–2008: Sacramento Kings

Coaching
- 2008–2010: Sacramento Kings (assistant)

Career highlights
- NBA All-Star (2002); NBA All-Rookie First Team (1997); Third-team All-American – AP, NABC (1996); Pac-10 Player of the Year (1996); First-team All-Pac-10 (1996); Pac-10 Freshman of the Year (1996); McDonald's All-American (1995); First-team Parade All-American (1995); 2× Mr. Georgia Basketball (1994, 1995)

Career NBA statistics
- Points: 15,028 (18.1 ppg)
- Rebounds: 6,239 (7.5 rpg)
- Assists: 2,109 (2.5 apg)
- Stats at NBA.com
- Stats at Basketball Reference
Medals
Men's basketball
Representing United States
Summer Olympics
Gold medal – first place	2000 Sydney	Team
FIBA Americas U18 Championship
Gold medal – first place	1994 Santa Rosa	Team

Julius Shareef Abdur-Rahim (born December 11, 1976) is an American former professional basketball player who is the president of the NBA G League. Nicknamed "Reef", he previously served as the director of player personnel for the Sacramento Kings of the National Basketball Association (NBA) and the general manager of the Reno Bighorns, the Kings' minor-league affiliate.

Abdur-Rahim played both the forward and center positions during his career. He emerged as a prospect at Joseph Wheeler High School in his hometown of Marietta, Georgia. Abdur-Rahim played for the California Golden Bears during the 1995–96 season before he entered the 1996 NBA draft. He was selected third overall by the Vancouver Grizzlies where he was the star of the team during his early NBA career. Abdur-Rahim played on the United States men's national basketball team that won the gold medal at the 2000 Sydney Olympics. He was traded by the Grizzlies in 2001 to the Atlanta Hawks with whom he made his only NBA All-Star appearance in the 2001–02 season. Abdur-Rahim was traded to the Portland Trail Blazers in 2004 before he signed with his last team, the Sacramento Kings, in 2008. Despite the fact that he achieved solid statistics throughout his career, Abdur-Rahim had played the second most games in NBA history without making a playoff appearance (744) until he made the playoffs for the first and only time in 2006. Following persistent injuries to his right knee, Abdur-Rahim announced his retirement from playing basketball in 2008. He finished with the lowest career plus–minus in NBA history at -2,904, a record that still stands as of the 2024–25 season.

== Early life ==
Shareef Abdur-Rahim is the second eldest sibling in the family of twelve children born to Aminah and William Abdur-Rahim. He values his parents for their guiding influence on him since his youth and credits them with his life philosophy: "remember how you came on all your accomplishments and stay humble." From an early age, Abdur-Rahim was surrounded by family members who played basketball; his brother, Muhammad, played at the University of Detroit while his late younger brother, Amir, played at the Southeastern Louisiana University and coached at the University of South Florida. Abdur-Rahim himself started playing competitive basketball at Joseph Wheeler High School in Marietta, Georgia. At Wheeler, he was named "Mr. Basketball" in back-to-back seasons, and he led the school to a state title as a junior in 1994. In his senior year, Abdur-Rahim averaged 31 points, 12.4 rebounds and 4 blocks per game.

Abdur-Rahim later attended college at the University of California, Berkeley, where he maintained a 3.5 GPA. At California, he averaged 21.1 points per game (ppg) and 8.4 rebounds per game (rpg) in 28 games. He was the first freshman in Pac-10 history to win Conference Player of the Year honors, and was named Third Team All-America by the Associated Press. Also named the Pac-10 Freshman of the Year, Abdur-Rahim set single-season freshman records for points, scoring average, field goals, and free throws. After a year at California, however, he decided to leave college to enter the 1996 NBA draft.

== Professional career ==
=== Vancouver Grizzlies (1996–2001) ===
Abdur-Rahim was selected third overall by the Vancouver Grizzlies in the 1996 Draft, behind Allen Iverson and Marcus Camby. He made an immediate impact playing for the Grizzlies, becoming the team's leading scorer while setting a franchise record of 18.7 points per game. He also averaged 6.9 rebounds and 2.2 assists per game. On January 11, 1997, Abdur-Rahim scored a season high 37 points and grabbed 7 rebounds in a 109–101 loss against the Kings. He finished third in balloting for the Schick NBA Rookie of the Year behind Philadelphia's Allen Iverson and Minnesota's Stephon Marbury, and he was picked for the All-Rookie First Team. By the end of the 1996–97 season, Abdur-Rahim led the team in scoring on 33 occasions, and rebounding on 23 occasions.

For the next few seasons, Abdur-Rahim remained the centerpiece of the Grizzlies team. In his sophomore season, he averaged 22.3 points, 7.1 rebounds and 2.6 assists per game. The following season, he elevated his performance with 23.0 points, 7.5 rebounds and 3.4 assists per game. On February 17, 1999, Abdur-Rahim scored a then career high 39 points, grabbed 13 rebounds, and recorded 5 assists in a 131-129 triple over time loss against the Celtics. Despite his best efforts, the Grizzlies remained at the bottom two spots of the Midwest Division in his first four seasons. In the 2000–01 season, Abdur-Rahim finished with a 20.5-point average for the fourth straight season and was ranked in the top 20 in 13 NBA statistical categories, once again leading the Grizzlies in both points and rebounds per game. Abdur-Rahim's importance to the team was highlighted in a game against the Indiana Pacers on December 1, 2000, when he earned all of the 20 points scored by the Grizzlies in the final quarter of the game.

=== Atlanta Hawks (2001–2004) ===
On June 27, 2001, the Atlanta Hawks reached an agreement to acquire Abdur-Rahim and the 27th overall pick in the 2001 NBA draft from the Vancouver Grizzlies in exchange for Brevin Knight, Lorenzen Wright and Pau Gasol, the third overall pick in the 2001 NBA Draft. Abdur-Rahim's return to his hometown, and expected partnership with sophomore Jason Terry, provided a significant amount of buzz around the league. While the Hawks finished the 2001–02 campaign with a 33–49 win–loss record, Abdur-Rahim's performances, including a career-high 50-point game, ensured that he would be selected to the NBA All-Star game for that season.

In his second season with the Hawks, Abdur-Rahim achieved another personal milestone on December 28, 2002, when his jump shot against the Washington Wizards made him the sixth-youngest player in NBA history to reach 10,000-points. Although Glenn Robinson, Jason Terry and Abdur-Rahim combined to average 57.9 points per game and become the highest-scoring trio in the league for the 2002–03 season, the Hawks failed to make the playoffs again. With an average of 19.9 points and 8.4 rebounds per game, Abdur-Rahim played in all but one of the Hawks' games. By the end of the season, Hawks General Manager Billy Knight decided major changes had to be made for the franchise to move forward, and Abdur-Rahim was traded the next season.

=== Portland Trail Blazers (2004–2005) ===
Abdur-Rahim was sent, along with Theo Ratliff and Dan Dickau, to the Portland Trail Blazers on February 9, 2004, in exchange for Rasheed Wallace and Wesley Person. His impact in the two seasons with the Trail Blazers was considerably less than in previous seasons. His averages were 16.3 points/7.5 rebounds and 16.8 points/7.3 rebounds for the 2003–04 and 2004–05 seasons respectively. At the end of the 2004–05 season, Abdur-Rahim became a free agent.

During the 2005 off-season, he was traded via a sign and trade agreement (in principle) to the New Jersey Nets for a first-round draft pick (which Portland planned to trade to the Phoenix Suns for Leandro Barbosa). On August 4, 2005, though the news conference was planned to announce the postponement of his arrival, it was revealed that he failed a required physical due to scar tissue found in his knee. The trade was put on hold, pending a second opinion from other medical sources. On August 7, Abdur-Rahim was quoted saying: "I don't feel I want to be a Net". He felt the knee was a non-issue, claiming that he never missed a game in his entire career because of the knee injury. Two days later, it was announced that New Jersey decided to rescind the trade.

=== Sacramento Kings (2005–2008) ===
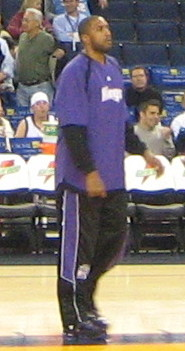
Abdur-Rahim with the Sacramento Kings in 2006

On August 12, 2005, Abdur-Rahim signed a free-agent contract with the Sacramento Kings. In his first season with them, Abdur-Rahim started in 30 of the 72 games he played. As a starter, he averaged 16.0 points, 6.2 rebounds and 3.0 assists per game. He shot .543 for field goal percentage, and almost .800 from the free throw line. The Kings went on to qualify for the 2006 playoffs. Abdur-Rahim made his postseason career debut against the San Antonio Spurs. At the same time, he ended a streak of having played the most games in NBA history without participating in the post-season. Abdur-Rahim had played the second most games in NBA history without making a playoff appearance (744); he made the playoffs for the first and only time in 2006. In his second season with the Kings, Abdur-Rahim continued to be deployed as a sixth man; however, the Kings failed to secure a playoff berth as Abdur-Rahim recorded 9.9 points per game. The 2007–08 season proved to be Abdur-Rahim's last, as he played only six games and his persistent knee injury forced him to announce his retirement on September 22, 2008. He joined the Sacramento Kings' coaching staff as an assistant the following week.

==== Front Office ====
On October 7, 2010, Abdur-Rahim was hired to be the assistant general manager for the Sacramento Kings. He later became the team's director of player personnel, a position he held in 2014 after new ownership had taken over in 2013. Abdur-Rahim left the team in September 2014. League sources would later report his departure occurred after the 2014 NBA draft, where Abdur-Rahim had arguments with coach Michael Malone and general manager Pete D'Alessandro.

== National team career ==
Prior to joining the NBA, Abdur-Rahim was the USA's leading scorer and rebounder at the 1994 COPABA Junior World Championship Qualifying Tournament held in Argentina. He averaged a double-double of 16.8 points and 10.1 rebounds. While trying for a team high in blocked shots averaging 1.6 blocks per game, he helped push the American squad to an 8–0 record, the gold medal, and a qualifying berth in the 1995 FIBA Junior World Championship. The following May he was named to USA Basketball's 1995 Junior Select Team that captured an 86–77 victory over an International Select Team in the inaugural Hoop Summit Game.

While playing for the Grizzlies, Abdur-Rahim was selected as a replacement for the injured Grant Hill to be part of the USA Men's basketball team, a team that included several NBA stars such as Kevin Garnett and Tim Hardaway and won the gold medal at the 2000 Olympic Games in Sydney, Australia.

== NBA career statistics ==
Legend
GP	Games played	GS	Games started	MPG	Minutes per game
FG%	Field goal percentage	3P%	3-point field goal percentage	FT%	Free throw percentage
RPG	Rebounds per game	APG	Assists per game	SPG	Steals per game
BPG	Blocks per game	PPG	Points per game	**Bold**	Career high
*	Led the league

=== Regular season ===
Year	Team	GP	GS	MPG	FG%	3P%	FT%	RPG	APG	SPG	BPG	PPG
1996–97	Vancouver	80	71	35.0	.453	.259	.756	6.9	2.2	1.0	1.0	18.7
1997–98	Vancouver	82*	**82***	36.0	.485	**.412**	.784	7.1	2.6	1.1	.9	22.3
1998–99	Vancouver	50*	50*	**40.4**	.432	.306	.841	7.5	**3.4**	**1.4**	**1.1**	**23.0**
1999–00	Vancouver	82	**82***	39.3	.465	.302	.809	**10.1**	3.3	1.1	**1.1**	20.3
2000–01	Vancouver	81	81	40.0	.472	.188	.834	9.1	3.1	1.1	1.0	20.5
2001–02	Atlanta	77	77	38.7	.461	.300	.801	9.0	3.1	1.3	**1.1**	21.2
2002–03	Atlanta	81	81	38.1	.478	.350	.841	8.4	3.0	1.1	.5	19.9
2003–04	Atlanta	**53***	53	36.9	.485	.217	.880	9.3	2.4	.8	.4	20.1
2003–04	Portland	**32***	3	22.8	.447	.364	.832	4.5	1.5	.8	.6	10.0
2004–05	Portland	54	49	34.6	.503	.385	.866	7.3	2.1	.9	.5	16.8
2005–06	Sacramento	72	30	27.2	**.525**	.227	.784	5.0	2.1	.7	.6	12.3
2006–07	Sacramento	80	45	25.2	.474	.150	.726	5.0	1.4	.7	.5	9.9
2007–08	Sacramento	6	0	8.5	.214	.000	**1.000**	1.7	.7	.2	.0	1.7
Career		830	704	34.8	.472	.297	.810	7.5	2.5	1.0	.8	18.1
All-Star		1	0	21.0	1.000	1.000	.000	6.0	.0	.0	.0	9.0

=== Playoffs ===
Year	Team	GP	GS	MPG	FG%	3P%	FT%	RPG	APG	SPG	BPG	PPG
2006	Sacramento	6	0	21.5	.535	.000	.600	4.8	1.2	.3	.0	9.2

== Coaching career ==
=== Sacramento Kings ===
On October 2, 2008, Abdur-Rahim was named as an assistant coach for the Sacramento Kings.

== Executive career ==
=== Sacramento Kings ===
On October 7, 2010, the Kings announced Abdur-Rahim as their assistant general manager.

=== Reno Bighorns ===
On August 29, 2013, Abdur-Rahim was named as the new general manager of the Reno Bighorns for the 2013–14 season.

=== NBA ===
Abdur-Rahim was the associate vice president of basketball operations of the NBA.

=== NBA G League ===
On December 11, 2018, Abdur-Rahim was named the president of the NBA G League, and replaced Malcolm Turner who stepped down on January 11, 2019, to become the Athletics Director at Vanderbilt University.

== Personal life ==
Abdur-Rahim and his wife Delicia have two children: a son Jabri, and a daughter, Samiyah. Jabri Abdur-Rahim was rated as an ESPN Top 30 player in the high school Class of 2020 and committed to play for the Virginia Cavaliers under Tony Bennett. He has since transferred to the University of Georgia and subsequently the Providence Friars.

Abdur-Rahim has started his own foundation, the Future Foundation, which provides after-school and other support services for youth at-risk in Atlanta. On television, Abdur-Rahim has appeared on an episode of The Jamie Foxx Show with fellow NBA players Gary Payton and Vin Baker. After retiring, Abdur-Rahim returned to U.C. Berkeley, graduating with a degree in sociology in 2012 with a 3.8 GPA. Abdur-Rahim earned an MBA at the University of Southern California Marshall School of Business in 2016.

Shareef's brother, Amir, died on October 24, 2024, age 43. At the time, Amir was the head coach for the USF Bulls men's basketball team, and had been coach of the Kennesaw State Owls men's basketball team for the previous four seasons.

Abdur-Rahim is referenced in the Latyrx song "The Quickening (The Wreckoning Part II)", from their 1997 album The Album.
