= Gans, Oklahoma =

- Town
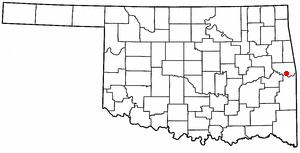
- Location of Gans, Oklahoma
- Coordinates: 35°23′15″N 94°41′41″W
- Country: United States
- State: Oklahoma
- County: Sequoyah

Area
  - Total: 0.22 sq mi (0.56 km^{2})
  - Land: 0.22 sq mi (0.56 km^{2})
  - Water: 0 sq mi (0.00 km^{2})
- Elevation: 532 ft (162 m)

Population (2020)
  - Total: 251
  - Density: 1,155.3/sq mi (446.05/km^{2})
- Time zone: UTC-6 (Central (CST))
  - Summer (DST): UTC-5 (CDT)
- ZIP code: 74936
- Area codes: 539/918
- FIPS code: 40-28350
- GNIS feature ID: 2412666
- Website: www.townofgans.com

Gans is a town in Sequoyah County, Oklahoma, United States. It is part of the Fort Smith, Arkansas-Oklahoma metropolitan statistical area. As of the 2020 census, Gans had a population of 251.

== History ==
At the time of its founding, Gans was located in the Sequoyah District of the Cherokee Nation. It was originally called Jack Town, but was renamed Gann after three brothers, who were Cherokee Indians, settled there: Charlie, Swimmer, and Tom Gann.

A post office opened at Gann, Indian Territory, on March 21, 1896. The Kansas City, Pittsburg and Gulf Railroad built a line through the area during 1895-6 and requested that the name be changed to Gans, since it already had two stations named Gann. The name of the post office changed to Gans on September 8, 1899.

Gans incorporated in 1902. It lost this status in 1933. It reincorporated in 1953. The town was seriously damaged by a tornado in 1957, but later rebuilt.

== Geography ==
Gans is located 7 miles (11 km) southeast of Sallisaw. According to the United States Census Bureau, the town has a total area of 0.2 square miles (0.52 km^{2}), all land.

== Demographics ==
Historical population
Census	Pop.	Note	%±
1900	136		—
1910	351		158.1%
1920	295		−16.0%
1930	204		−30.8%
1960	234		—
1970	238		1.7%
1980	346		45.4%
1990	218		−37.0%
2000	208		−4.6%
2010	312		50.0%
2020	251		−19.6%
U.S. Decennial Census

=== 2020 census ===
As of the 2020 census, Gans had a population of 251. The median age was 31.9 years. 26.7% of residents were under the age of 18 and 10.8% of residents were 65 years of age or older. For every 100 females there were 91.6 males, and for every 100 females age 18 and over there were 89.7 males age 18 and over.

0.0% of residents lived in urban areas, while 100.0% lived in rural areas.

There were 86 households in Gans, of which 48.8% had children under the age of 18 living in them. Of all households, 40.7% were married-couple households, 16.3% were households with a male householder and no spouse or partner present, and 31.4% were households with a female householder and no spouse or partner present. About 15.1% of all households were made up of individuals and 9.3% had someone living alone who was 65 years of age or older.

There were 110 housing units, of which 21.8% were vacant. The homeowner vacancy rate was 2.1% and the rental vacancy rate was 11.4%.

Racial composition as of the 2020 census
Race	Number	Percent
White	161	64.1%
Black or African American	1	0.4%
American Indian and Alaska Native	70	27.9%
Asian	0	0.0%
Native Hawaiian and Other Pacific Islander	0	0.0%
Some other race	2	0.8%
Two or more races	17	6.8%
Hispanic or Latino (of any race)	4	1.6%

=== 2000 census ===
As of the 2000 census, 208 people, 79 households, and 57 families lived in the town. The population density was 1,111.7 inhabitants per square mile (429.2/km^{2}). The 87 housing units had an average density of 465.0 per square mile (179.5/km^{2}). The racial makeup of the town was 70.67% White, 0.96% African American, 26.44% Native American, 0.48% from other races, and 1.44% from two or more races. Hispanics or Latinos of any race were 0.48% of the population.

Of the 79 households, 38.0% had children under 18 living with them, 51.9% were married couples living together, 19.0% had a female householder with no husband present, and 27.8% were not families. About 25.3% of all households were made up of individuals, and 16.5% had someone living alone who was 65 or older. The average household size was 2.63 and the average family size was 3.12.

In the town, the age distribution was 31.3% under 18, 8.2% from 18 to 24, 26.9% from 25 to 44, 14.9% from 45 to 64, and 18.8% who were 65 or older. The median age was 30 years. For every 100 females, there were 98.1 males. For every 100 females 18 and over, there were 78.8 males.

The median income for a household in the town was $17,344, and for a family was $23,750. Males had a median income of $24,375 versus $12,188 for females. The per capita income for the town was $8,922. About 25.9% of families and 27.1% of the population were below the poverty line, including 36.0% of those under the age of 18 and 25.8% of those 65 or over.

== Notable people ==
- Cal Smith — American country music singer
- Bryant Reeves — American basketball player, Vancouver Grizzlies
