= Malcolm Turner (disambiguation) =

Malcolm Turner is a vice chancellor for athletics and university affairs and athletics director at Vanderbilt University.

Malcolm Turner may also refer to:

- Malcolm Bruce Turner (1922–1993), musician
- Malcolm Turner, actor, played Chemist in The Thief Lord
- Malcolm Turner, a character in the film Big Momma's House
