= Midwest Division =

Midwest Division may refer to:

- Midwest Division (NBA)
- Midwest Division (OHL)
