= Eric Mobley =

American basketball player (1970–2021)

Personal information
- Born: February 1, 1970 The Bronx, New York, U.S.
- Died: June 2, 2021 (aged 51) Los Angeles, California, U.S.
- Listed height: 6 ft 11 in (2.11 m)
- Listed weight: 235 lb (107 kg)

Career information
- High school: Salesian (New Rochelle, New York)
- College: Allegany College (1989–1990); Pittsburgh (1991–1994)
- NBA draft: 1994: 1st round, 18th overall pick
- Drafted by: Milwaukee Bucks
- Playing career: 1994–1997
- Position: Center
- Number: 52

Career history
- 1994–1995: Milwaukee Bucks
- 1995–1997: Vancouver Grizzlies

Career highlights
- Third-team All-Big East (1994); Fourth-team Parade All-American (1989)

Career NBA statistics
- Points: 440 (3.9 ppg)
- Rebounds: 351 (3.1 rpg)
- Stats at NBA.com
- Stats at Basketball Reference

Eric Mobley (February 1, 1970 – June 2, 2021) was an American professional basketball player who played three seasons in the National Basketball Association (NBA). He was selected by the Milwaukee Bucks in the first round (18th pick overall) of the 1994 NBA draft. A 6'11" center from Allegany Community College and the University of Pittsburgh, Mobley played in three NBA seasons for the Bucks and Vancouver Grizzlies. In his three-year career, Mobley appeared in 113 games and averaged 3.9 points, 3.1 rebounds, 0.5 assists, 0.2 steals, and 0.5 blocks per game. He died on June 2, 2021 from cancer.

He is not to be confused with SMU Mustangs' assistant basketball coach Eric Mobley, who is the father of professional basketball players Evan Mobley and Isaiah Mobley.

== Career statistics ==
Legend
GP	Games played	GS	Games started	MPG	Minutes per game
FG%	Field goal percentage	3P%	3-point field goal percentage	FT%	Free throw percentage
RPG	Rebounds per game	APG	Assists per game	SPG	Steals per game
BPG	Blocks per game	PPG	Points per game	**Bold**	Career high

=== NBA ===
Year	Team	GP	GS	MPG	FG%	3P%	FT%	RPG	APG	SPG	BPG	PPG
1994–95	Milwaukee	**46**	**26**	12.8	**.591**	**1.000**	.489	3.3	0.5	0.2	0.6	3.9
1995–96	Milwaukee	5	3	13.0	.286	.000	.500	2.4	0.0	0.2	0.2	1.2
1995–96	Vancouver	34	1	**18.0**	.550	.500	.446	**3.8**	**0.6**	**0.4**	**0.7**	**5.4**
1996–97	Vancouver	28	8	11.0	.444	.000	**.533**	2.1	0.5	0.2	0.4	2.6
Career		113	38	13.9	.541	.750	.475	3.1	0.5	0.2	0.5	3.9

=== College ===
Year	Team	GP	GS	MPG	FG%	3P%	FT%	RPG	APG	SPG	BPG	PPG
1991–92	Pittsburgh	**33**	-	16.4	.559	-	.410	4.6	0.6	0.4	1.7	7.2
1992–93	Pittsburgh	28	-	26.8	.542	-	**.553**	7.5	1.8	0.3	1.9	10.4
1993–94	Pittsburgh	27	-	**29.6**	**.568**	-	.492	**8.8**	**2.0**	**0.7**	**2.8**	**13.7**
Career		88	-	23.8	.557	-	.486	6.8	1.4	0.5	2.1	10.2
