= Finding Big Country =

- Directed by: Kathleen Jayme
- Written by: Kathleen Jayme
- Produced by: Michael Grand
- Starring: Bryant Reeves
- Cinematography: Mike Dinsmore
- Edited by: Greg Ng
- Release date: September 30, 2018 (VIFF)
- Running time: 40 minutes
- Country: Canada
- Language: English

Finding Big Country is a Canadian documentary film, directed by Kathleen Jayme and released in 2018. The film documents her attempts to trace the whereabouts of former Vancouver Grizzlies player Bryant "Big Country" Reeves several years after his 2001 retirement from basketball.

The film had its theatrical premiere at the 2018 Vancouver International Film Festival, where it was the winner of the People's Choice Award and the Daily Hive #mustseeBC Award. It subsequently received two special public screenings in Reeves' home state of Oklahoma before returning to the film festival circuit, where it won the award for Best Canadian Film at the Toronto Reel Asian International Film Festival, and the awards for Best Multicultural Film and Best Documentary POV at the 2019 Yorkton Film Festival.

The film won five Leo Awards in 2019, for Best Short Documentary, Best Direction in a Short Documentary (Jayme), Best Screenwriting in a Short Documentary (Jayme), Best Picture Editing in a Short Documentary (Greg Ng) and Best Sound in a Short Documentary (Gregor Phillips).

Jayme subsequently made several further short documentary films about basketball, including We the West (2019) and Born Identities (2021), before releasing the full-length documentary film The Grizzlie Truth, an exploration of the Vancouver Grizzlies' overall failure, in 2022.

== See also ==
- List of basketball films
