= The Grizzlie Truth =

2022 Canadian film directed by Kathleen Jayme

- Directed by: Kathleen Jayme
- Produced by: James Brown; Michael Grand
- Cinematography: Mike Dinsmore
- Edited by: Greg Ng
- Production company: Grizz Films
- Release date: October 1, 2022 (VIFF)
- Running time: 97 minutes
- Country: Canada
- Language: English

The Grizzlie Truth is a Canadian documentary film, directed by Kathleen Jayme and released in 2022. Following up on Jayme's 2018 film Finding Big Country, the film traces the history of the ill-fated Vancouver Grizzlies of the National Basketball Association, attempting to trace the reasons for the team's relocation to Memphis.

The film premiered on October 1, 2022, at the 2022 Vancouver International Film Festival, where it was named the winner of the Audience Award for the Galas & Special Presentations program. The film was subsequently screened at the Toronto Reel Asian International Film Festival where it won the Audience Award for best documentary.

The film was screened in Toronto at the Hot Docs Ted Rogers Cinema on December 10, 2022, with the beginning of a theatrical run in early 2023.

== See also ==
- List of basketball films
