= NBA Films for Fans =

2021 short film anthology

NBA Films for Fans is a Canadian short film anthology, which premiered in 2021. Funded by the Ontario Lottery and Gaming Corporation to celebrate the 75th anniversary of the first-ever National Basketball Association game between the Toronto Huskies and the New York Knickerbockers at Maple Leaf Gardens in 1946, the project commissioned five emerging Canadian black, indigenous and people of colour filmmakers to create short documentary films about basketball.

The only rules that the filmmakers were given were that the film could be no longer than seven minutes and 50 seconds in length, and that it had to incorporate footage from the NBA archives.

The films premiered on September 17, 2021, as a special event at the 2021 Toronto International Film Festival. They were subsequently released to the web on a dedicated free online streaming platform.

== Films ==
- "Born Identities" – Kathleen Jayme: The history of the creation of the Toronto Raptors and Vancouver Grizzlies logos in 1995.
- "Inheritance" – Shawn Gerrard: An exploration of the love of basketball as a bonding experience in families.
- "Shorty" – Romeo Candido: A young girl who is discouraged when she realizes that she is the shortest person at her local basketball tryouts is inspired when her father tells her the history of several shorter players who have excelled in the NBA.
- "The Shot" – S.M. Turrell: Kawhi Leonard's Game 7 buzzer beater shot in the Eastern Conference Semifinals of the 2019 NBA playoffs.
- "Draft Day" – Thyrone Tommy: Several Canadian NBA hopefuls await word about their futures on the day of the NBA draft.

== See also ==
- List of basketball films
