= Bryant Reeves =

American basketball player (born 1973)

Personal information
- Born: June 8, 1973 (age 53) Fort Smith, Arkansas, U.S.
- Listed height: 7 ft 0 in (2.13 m)
- Listed weight: 290 lb (132 kg)

Career information
- High school: Gans (Gans, Oklahoma)
- College: Oklahoma State (1991–1995)
- NBA draft: 1995: 1st round, 6th overall pick
- Drafted by: Vancouver Grizzlies
- Playing career: 1995–2001
- Position: Center
- Number: 50

Career history
- 1995–2001: Vancouver Grizzlies

Career highlights
- NBA All-Rookie Second Team (1996); 2× Second-team All-American – UPI (1994, 1995); 2× Third-team All-American – AP (1994, 1995); Big Eight Player of the Year (1993); 3× First-team All-Big Eight (1993–1995)

Career NBA statistics
- Points: 4,945 (12.5 ppg)
- Rebounds: 2,745 (6.9 rpg)
- Blocks: 302 (0.8 bpg)
- Stats at NBA.com
- Stats at Basketball Reference

Bryant Reeves (born June 8, 1973) is an American former professional basketball player. Reeves spent his entire career with the National Basketball Association's Vancouver Grizzlies, playing with the team from 1995 until 2001. He was nicknamed "Big Country" by his college teammate Byron Houston after Reeves was amazed by the size of the United States following his first cross-country airplane flight, having grown up in the small community of Gans, Oklahoma.

== College career ==
Standing 7 ft (213 cm) tall and weighing between 275 and 300 pounds (125 and 136 kg), Reeves was an imposing physical presence on the court and was primed to become a dominant center in the NBA. He had a strong collegiate career with Oklahoma State University, where he averaged 21.5 points per game as a senior and led OSU to the 1995 Final Four.

== Professional career ==
Reeves became the Grizzlies' first-ever draft choice, selected sixth overall in the 1995 NBA draft.

Reeves played six seasons with the Grizzlies. After averaging 13.3 points per game in a solid rookie season, he averaged 16.2 points per game in the 1996–97 season and was subsequently awarded with a six-year, $61.8 million contract extension. The next season was his best, when he averaged 16.3 points, 7.9 rebounds, and 1.08 blocked shots per game. During that season he scored a career-high 41 points against the Boston Celtics. He was the first and last player to wear #50 before Zach Randolph, whom it was retired in honor of.

After 1998, weight-control problems and injuries began to take a toll on Reeves, and his numbers fell off dramatically. He was still the starting center for the Grizzlies, but his minutes per game dropped, and his field goal percentage dropped significantly. Eventually, after the Grizzlies moved to Memphis, Tennessee in 2001, Reeves started the season on the injured list due to chronic back pain and was never able to play another game (the only games he played with the team in Memphis were two preseason games). During preseason play in the fall of 2001, Reeves experienced back pain after just two preseason games. On January 29, 2002, the Grizzlies announced Reeves' retirement from the NBA due to chronic back pain caused by degenerative discs. At the time he was the Grizzlies all-time leader in games played with 395.

== NBA career statistics ==
Legend
GP	Games played	GS	Games started	MPG	Minutes per game
FG%	Field goal percentage	3P%	3-point field goal percentage	FT%	Free throw percentage
RPG	Rebounds per game	APG	Assists per game	SPG	Steals per game
BPG	Blocks per game	PPG	Points per game	**Bold**	Career high

Year	Team	GP	GS	MPG	FG%	3P%	FT%	RPG	APG	SPG	BPG	PPG
1995–96	Vancouver	**77**	63	24.9	.457	.000	.732	7.4	1.4	**.6**	.7	13.3
1996–97	Vancouver	75	**75**	**37.0**	.486	.091	.704	**8.1**	**2.1**	.4	.9	16.2
1997–98	Vancouver	74	74	34.1	**.523**	.000	.706	7.9	2.1	.5	**1.1**	**16.3**
1998–99	Vancouver	25	14	28.1	.406	.000	.578	5.5	1.5	.5	.3	10.8
1999–00	Vancouver	69	67	25.7	.448	.000	.648	5.7	1.2	.5	.6	8.9
2000–01	Vancouver	75	48	24.4	.460	**.250**	**.796**	6.0	1.1	**.6**	.7	8.3
Career		395	341	30.6	.475	.074	.703	6.9	1.6	.5	.8	12.5

== Personal life ==
Bryant was the subject of Kathleen Jayme's documentary film Finding Big Country in 2018.

Following his career, Reeves went back to Oklahoma and is now a cattle farmer and a family man, living on a ranch in Sequoyah County. His son Trey was a three-year walk on at Oklahoma State, earning a scholarship his final year before going on to being accepted at Harvard Law School.

== See also ==
- List of NCAA Division I men's basketball players with 2000 points and 1000 rebounds
