= Anthem of a Teenage Prophet =

- Poster
- Directed by: Robin Hays
- Written by: Joshua Close; Andy Matic; Elisah Matic
- Based on: Anthem of a Teenage Prophet by Joanne Proulx
- Produced by: Tina Pehme; Kim Roberts
- Starring: Cameron Monaghan; Peyton List; Juliette Lewis
- Cinematography: Todd M. Duyn
- Edited by: Austin Andrews
- Music by: Andrew Harris
- Production companies: Sepia Films; Hand Picked Films
- Distributed by: SP Releasing
- Release date: October 6, 2018 (VIFF)
- Running time: 99 minutes
- Country: Canada
- Language: English

Anthem of a Teenage Prophet is a 2018 Canadian drama film directed by Robin Hays and starring Cameron Monaghan, Peyton List and Juliette Lewis. It is based on Joanne Proulx's young adult novel of the same name. It is also Hays' feature directorial debut. The film premiered at the 2018 Vancouver International Film Festival.

== Cast ==
- Cameron Monaghan as Luke Hunter
- Grayson Gabriel as Fang
- Peyton List as Faith
- Juliette Lewis as Mary
- Alex MacNicoll as Stan

== Release ==
The film was released theatrically on January 11, 2019.

== Plot ==
The film features the story of Luke Hunter, a teenager who develops the ability to foresee death at random. One day he foresees the death of his best friend, Stan and struggles when the premonition becomes reality.

From there Luke struggles not only with grief, but the changing relationships between himself and his friends; Faith and Fang. Added in with the ongoing premonitions, Luke is on a journey that will change his life, and the lives of those around him.

== Reception ==
Frank Scheck of The Hollywood Reporter gave the film a negative review and wrote, "Such restraint is admirable in a genre not known for it, but it results in the film feeling more tepid than it should have been."
