= The Museum of Forgotten Triumphs =

- Film poster
- Directed by: Bojan Bodružić
- Written by: Bojan Bodružić
- Produced by: Bojan Bodružić; Igor Drljaca
- Cinematography: Bojan Bodružić
- Edited by: Bojan Bodružić
- Music by: Bojan Bodružić; Alexandre Klinke
- Production company: Japanese Polka Dancing Films
- Release date: September 30, 2018 (VIFF)
- Running time: 85 minutes
- Country: Canada
- Language: Serbo-Croatian

The Museum of Forgotten Triumphs is a Canadian documentary film, directed by Bojan Bodružić and released in 2018. The film centres on interviews between Bodružić, a Bosnian-born filmmaker who came to Canada with his parents as refugees from the Bosnian War in the 1990s, and his grandparents, who never left Sarajevo, about their experiences living through the war.

The film took 15 years to make, beginning with Bodružić's first trip back to Sarajevo after the war in the early 2000s.

The film premiered on September 30, 2018 at the 2018 Vancouver International Film Festival, where it won the award for Best Canadian Documentary. It received a Vancouver Film Critics Circle nomination for Best Canadian Documentary at the Vancouver Film Critics Circle Awards 2018.
