= I'm Just Here for the Riot =

2023 documentary film

- Directed by: Asia Youngman; Kathleen Jayme
- Produced by: James Brown; Michael Grand; Gentry Kirby
- Cinematography: Kaayla Whachell
- Edited by: Katie Chipperfield and Greg Ng
- Distributed by: ESPN Films
- Release date: May 5, 2023 (Hot Docs)
- Running time: 77 minutes
- Country: Canada
- Language: English

I'm Just Here for the Riot is a 2023 documentary film about the 2011 Stanley Cup riot that occurred in Vancouver after Game 7 of the Stanley Cup Final between the Vancouver Canucks and the Boston Bruins. Directed by Kathleen Jayme and Asia Youngman, it examines the riot through on-the-ground footage, interviews with many people who were there, including rioters who were outed on social media and the, "lasting, multi-platform impact the riot had across the city."

The documentary premiered at the 2023 Hot Docs Canadian International Documentary Festival. It also screened at the 42nd Vancouver International Film Festival. It is the 124th full-length film in ESPN's 30 for 30 series.

== Background ==
An estimated 155,000 people were in downtown Vancouver to watch Game 7 of the Stanley Cup Final. A massive riot broke out almost immediately after the conclusion of the Boston Bruins’ win over the Vancouver Canucks. 122 cars were damaged or destroyed, police cars were burned, building windows were shattered and stores were looted as waves of young people were caught in mob mentality, resulting in over $3.78M in damages. At least 140 people were injured, including nine police officers and 101 people arrested. In total, police brought 887 charges against 301 individuals.

== Production ==
Both directors, Kathleen Jayme and Asia Youngman, are Vancouverites who watched Game 7: Youngman was present downtown while Jayme watched from home. Jayme went downtown the following morning to interview cleanup volunteers. They began developing the documentary together in 2018 but every broadcaster in Canada turned them down. In February 2020, they pitched it to the former director of development at ESPN and were greenlit the following year. Sound and colour correction was completed by April 2023.

== Cast ==
Rioters were quickly identified online, described as the first "smartphone riot" and "trial-by-social-media." Interviews include some of the people whose faces were "named and shamed."

== Reception ==
Susan G. Cole, writing for POV Magazine, said it was an "emotional experience" and "loaded with information." Rachel Ho praised its "balanced approach exploring the effects of social media and mob mentality." Writing for TheGATE, Andrew Parker described it as "a typically great ESPN 30 for 30 documentary" and "compelling viewing... sure to spark debate."

The film was named to the initial longlist for the 2023 Jean-Marc Vallée DGC Discovery Award.

== See also ==
- List of films about ice hockey
