= Kathleen Jayme =

Canadian documentary filmmaker

- Born: 1988 (age 36–37)
- Occupation: Director
- Years active: 2018–present
- Website: Official Website

Kathleen Jayme is a Canadian documentary filmmaker from Vancouver, British Columbia. She is most noted for the films Finding Big Country and The Grizzlie Truth, which examine the history of the ill-fated Vancouver Grizzlies of the National Basketball Association.

== Career ==
Finding Big Country, which documented Jayme's attempts to trace the whereabouts of former Grizzlies player Bryant "Big Country" Reeves several years after his 2001 retirement from basketball, premiered at the 2018 Vancouver International Film Festival, where it was the winner of the People's Choice Award and the Daily Hive #mustseeBC Award.

The Grizzlie Truth, a portrait of the team's overall history and failure, premiered at the 2022 Vancouver International Film Festival, where it was the winner of the Audience Award for most popular film in the Galas & Special Presentations program.

Jayme also created Born Identities, a short documentary film about the creation of the Grizzlies and Toronto Raptors logos, which screened at the 2021 Toronto International Film Festival as part of the NBA Films for Fans project.

She received a Canadian Screen Award nomination for Best Writing in a Web Program or Series at the 10th Canadian Screen Awards in 2022 for "Invasion of the Murder Hornets", an episode of the documentary web series Farm Crime.

Her latest documentary, I'm Just Here for the Riot, examining the 2011 Vancouver Stanley Cup riot, was produced for ESPN's 30 for 30 in collaboration with Asia Youngman, and premiered at the 2023 Hot Docs Canadian International Documentary Festival.
