= Aminatou Echard =

French filmmaker

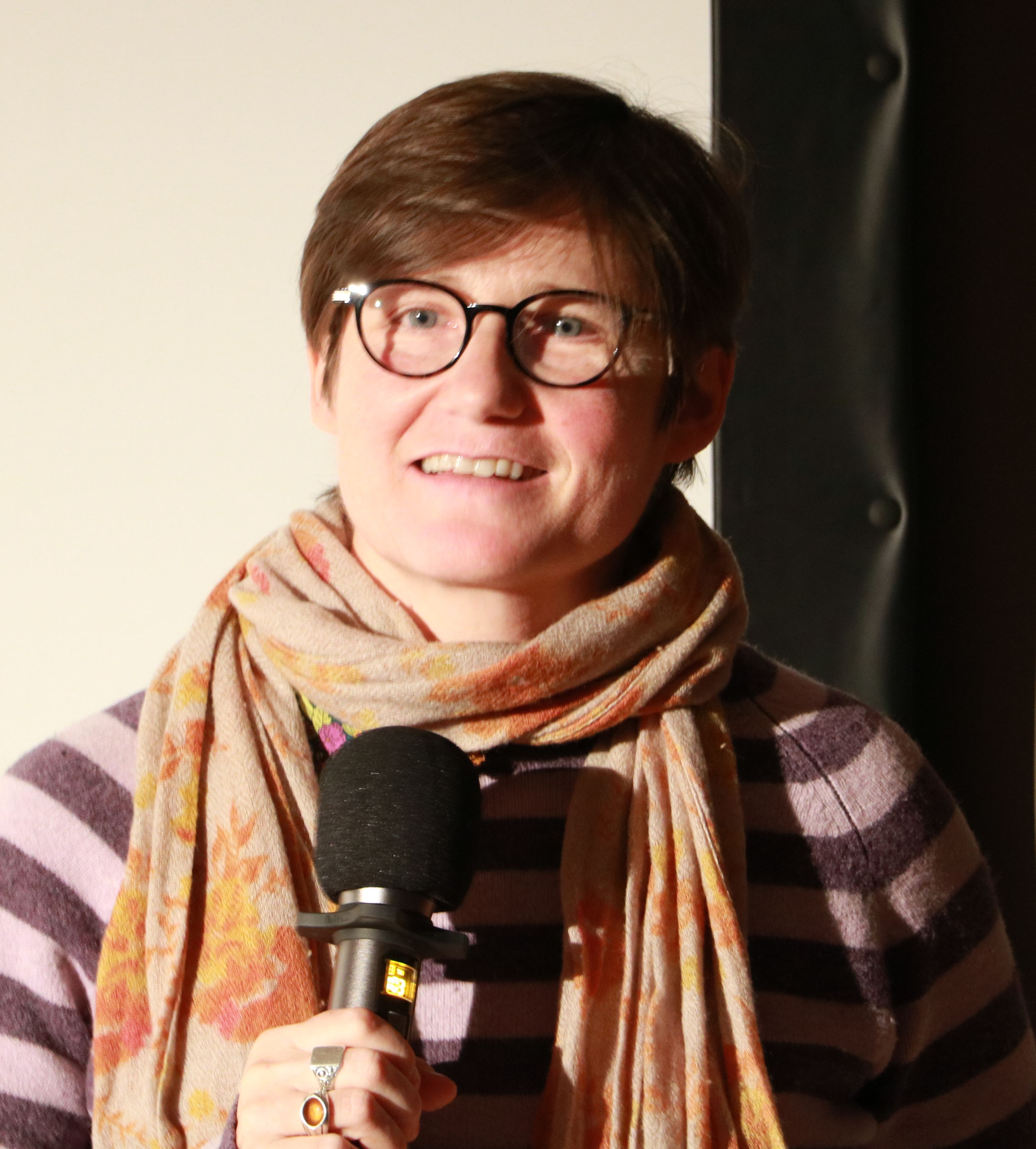
Image of Aminatou Echard

Aminatou Echard (born 1973) is a French filmmaker, best known for her 2018 documentary film, Jamilia.

== Biography ==
Echard was born in 1973 in Les Lilas, France. She went on to study Music, Performing Arts and Film Studies in Paris and Bologna.

== Filmography ==
- Jamilia (2018)
- (Marco) (2014)
- Broadway (2011)
