= Asia Youngman =

Cree-Métis filmmaker from Canada

Asia Youngman is a Cree-Métis filmmaker from Canada.

In 2017 she released her debut short documentary film Lelum', which won the award for Best Documentary Short at the 2017 imagineNATIVE Film and Media Arts Festival.

In 2018, she was one of eight women filmmakers selected for the Academy of Canadian Cinema and Television's Apprenticeship for Women Directors program, alongside Kathleen Hepburn, Kirsten Carthew, Alicia K. Harris, Allison White, Tiffany Hsiung, Halima Ouardiri, and Kristina Wagenbauer. In the same year Youngman and Trevor Mack collaborated on the short documentary In the Valley of Wild Horses.

In 2019, Youngman released This Ink Runs Deep, a short documentary about Indigenous tattooing traditions. It won the award for Best Short Documentary at the 2019 Calgary International Film Festival. In 2021, she released Hatha, her first narrative short film, and followed up in 2022 with N'xaxaitkw.

In 2023, Youngman and Kathleen Jayme collaborated on I'm Just Here for the Riot, a feature documentary about the 2011 Vancouver Stanley Cup riot. The film premiered at the 2023 Hot Docs Canadian International Documentary Festival.

In 2025 Youngman won the Betty Youson Award for Best Canadian Short Documentary at the Hot Docs Canadian International Documentary Festival for her short film Delta Dawn.

Youngman has also directed episodes of the television series Odd Squad, Odd Squad Mobile Unit and Amplify, and the television film The Hillsdale Adoption Scam.
