= Tulapop Saenjaroen =

Tulapop Saenjaroen is a Thai experimental filmmaker and artist.

== Career ==
In 2010, Saenjaroen organized a Siamese Smile Contest at the Chatuchak Weekend Market, in which participants competed to a continuous smile for as long as possible. For his 2013 performance work Disavowing Voices, he arranged for four vocalists unfamiliar with Thai to learn the Thai National Anthem and perform it.

As part of a residency through the NTU Centre for Contemporary Art Singapore, Saenjaroen collaborated with Anocha Suwichakornpong on the 2015 film Nightfall. It stars Suwichkornpong as a fictionalized version of herself researching Thai politics. The film combines this story with documentary-style footage taken in Singapore. A voiceover recites speeches delivered by Thai Prime Minister Thanom Kittikachorn and Singaporean Prime Minister Lee Kuan Yew in 1973. The film developed several elements that recur in Saenjaroen's later films, such as narration from multiple perspectives and the relation between the present and possible futures.

A Room with a Coconut View (2018) is set in the tourist destination of Bang Saen Beach. It depicts an automated tour guide, Kanya, delivering a presentation to Alex, a hotel guest.

Saenjaroen's 2020 film People on Sunday is inspired by the 1930 German film People on Sunday. Like the original film, it was shot on Sundays with a cast of non-professional actors. It reinterprets the light, cheerful tone of the original and remakes it with stock phrases delivered in a stilted manner. The film deals with themes of self-improvement culture and the relation between leisure and labor.

Squish! (2021) examines the history of film and the work of Sanae Klaikleun, an animator who unsuccessfully attempted to create Thailand's first animated film. Notes from the Periphery (2021), shot in Laem Chabang, creates compositions that contrast the city's commercial port with the surrounding communities.
