= Malcolm Turner =

American sports administrator

Athletic Director of Vanderbilt University
- In office February 1, 2019 – February 4, 2020
- Preceded by: David Williams II
- Succeeded by: Candice Storey Lee

President of the NBA G League
- In office November 12, 2014 – January 11, 2019
- Preceded by: Dan Reed
- Succeeded by: Shareef Abdur-Rahim

Personal details
- Education: University of North Carolina at Chapel Hill (BBA); Harvard University (JD, MBA)

Malcolm Turner is an athletics administrator who most recently served as the Athletic Director at Vanderbilt University. Prior to this role, he served as the president of the NBA G League.

== Early life ==
Turner attended the University of North Carolina at Chapel Hill where he was a Morehead-Cain Scholar. He was member of Alpha Phi Alpha fraternity. He graduated with a business degree and was a Rhodes Scholar finalist.

He earned joint J.D. and M.B.A degrees from Harvard University.

== Career ==
Turner is a member of the New York State Bar. Turner worked at Wasserman Media Group, serving as the managing director of the golf division. Prior to his role in the golf division, Turner helped build Wasserman’s consulting division as its managing director, creating and managing sports, entertainment, venue and new product launch strategies for leading corporate brands and properties.

On October 31, 2014, Malcolm Turner was hired as the president of the NBA Development League (NBA D-League). As president, the league grew from 14 to 27 teams as of the 2018–19 season. Under his leadership, Gatorade became the title sponsor of the D-League, and it was renamed the NBA G League prior to the 2017–18 season.

On February 1, 2019, Turner became the Athletic Director at Vanderbilt University. He resigned on February 4, 2020.

== Awards and honors ==
At UNC, he received the Ernest L. Mackie Chancellor’s Award for character, scholarship and leadership. He was named in SportsBusiness Journal’s “Forty Under 40” in 2007.

== Personal life ==
Turner served on the advisory boards of Teach for America, the UNC Kenan–Flagler Business School, and the Morehead-Cain Scholarship Fund.
