= Stu Jackson =

American basketball player, coach, executive

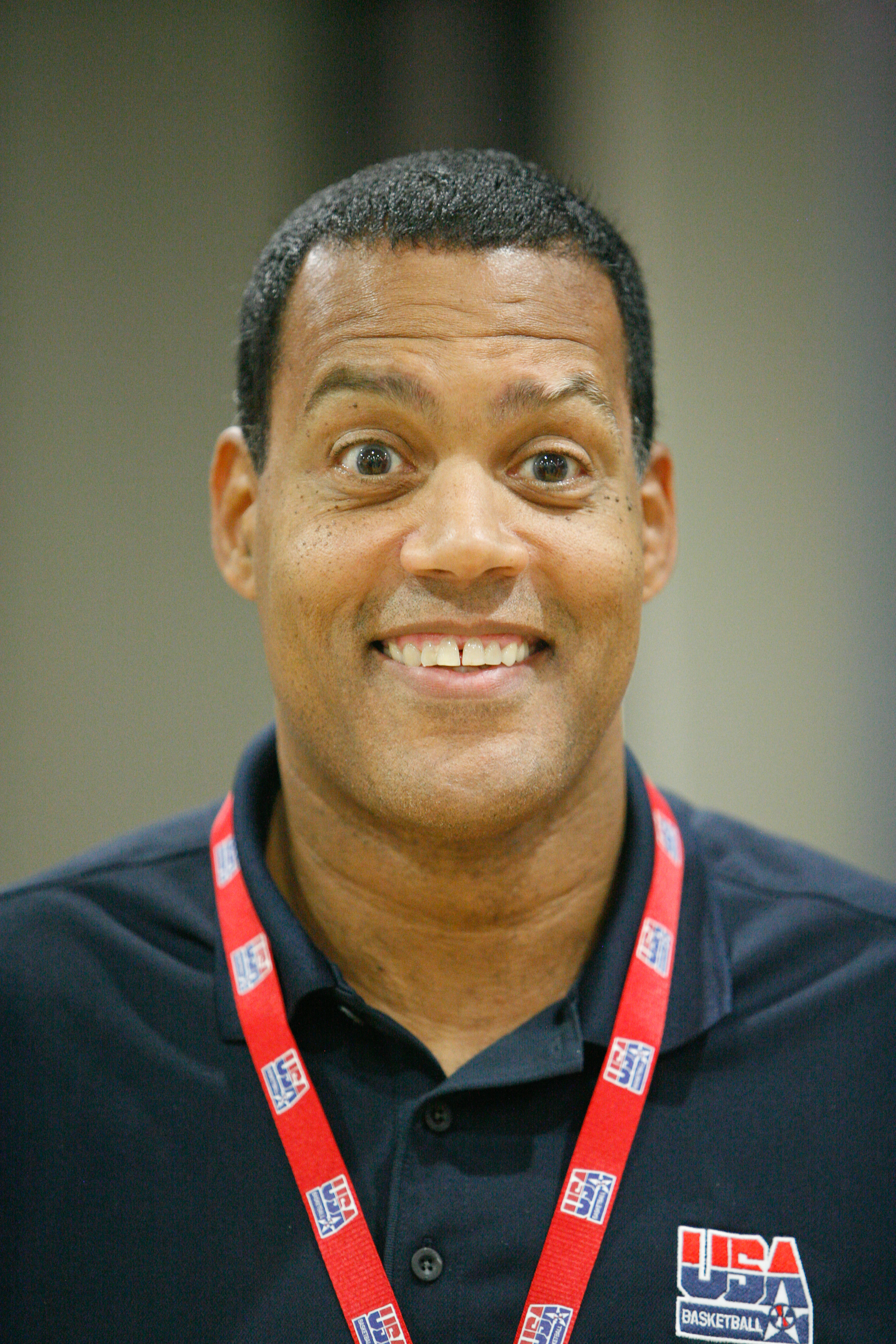
- Jackson in 2008

Personal information
- Born: December 11, 1955 (age 70) Reading, Pennsylvania, U.S.
- Listed height: 6 ft 6 in (1.98 m)

Career information
- College: Oregon (1973–1976); Seattle (1977–1978)
- NBA draft: 1978: undrafted
- Position: Forward
- Coaching career: 1981–1997

Career history

Coaching
- 1981–1983: Oregon (assistant)
- 1983–1985: Washington State (assistant)
- 1985–1987: Providence (assistant)
- 1987–1989: New York Knicks (assistant)
- 1989–1990: New York Knicks
- 1992–1994: Wisconsin
- 1997: Vancouver Grizzlies (interim)

Stuart Wayne Jackson (born December 11, 1955) is an American basketball executive and former basketball coach. He is currently the Commissioner of the West Coast Conference since April 24, 2023 and a member of the NCAA Division I Men’s Basketball Committee since June 2024. Jackson has coached the New York Knicks from 1989 to 1990, and the Vancouver Grizzlies in 1997, and has also served as the Grizzlies' general manager. He is the former executive vice president of the National Basketball Association (NBA). He previously was the director of basketball operations for the Pau-based French professional club Élan Béarnais from 2021 to 2023.

== Career ==
Jackson played basketball at the University of Oregon and Seattle University. He worked as an associate coach and head recruiting coordinator under Rick Pitino at Providence College from 1985 to 1987. He also worked as an assistant coach at Washington State University from 1983 to 1985 and at the University of Oregon from 1981 through 1983. Jackson was named the head coach of the New York Knicks in 1989 at the age of 33, becoming the then second-youngest head coach in NBA history. The Knicks went 52–45 during his tenure, upsetting the Boston Celtics in the 1990 playoffs before losing to the eventual NBA champions Detroit Pistons.

After starting the 1990–1991 season by winning the 1990 McDonald's Open, Jackson was fired in December after a 7–8 start in the NBA.

He was head coach of the Wisconsin Badgers in the 1992–93 and 1993–94 seasons, leading the Badgers to the 1994 NCAA tournament. He resigned after the tournament ended to become general manager of the expansion team Vancouver Grizzlies. He was general manager of the NBA's Vancouver Grizzlies for the franchise's first five seasons, during which the Grizzlies lost 300 of 378 games. In June 2007, he became the executive vice president of basketball operations for the NBA, a league official whose duties included penalizing players for on-court misconduct. His duties included being in charge of on-the-court operations, scheduling, game rules, conduct, discipline and serving as the chair of the Competition Committee. Jackson holds a bachelor's degree in business administration from Seattle University. Jackson resides in New York with his four daughters.

Jackson was announced on July 15, 2014 as the Big East Conference's Senior Associate Commissioner for Men's Basketball beginning July 28. He served in that capacity for nine years until 2023.

Jackson was appointed as the fifth full-time Commissioner of the West Coast Conference on March 6, 2023, officially assuming responsibilities seven weeks later on April 24. His first major move was announcing on December 22 the additions of Oregon State University and Washington State University as associate members across 12 sports for two academic years beginning in 2024–25. The conference expanded further on May 10, 2024, when Jackson's alma mater Seattle University was approved to become a full member on July 1, 2025. He replaced then-Santa Clara University Athletics Director Renee Baumgartner on the NCAA Division I Men’s Basketball Committee on May 31, 2024. His term expires in 2029.

== College head coaching record ==
Record table
Season	Team	Overall	Conference	Standing	Postseason
Wisconsin Badgers (Big Ten Conference) (1992–1994)
1992–93	Wisconsin	14–14	7–11	T–8th	NIT first round
1993–94	Wisconsin	18–11	8–10	7th	NCAA Division I second round
Wisconsin:		32–25 (.561)	15–21 (.417)		
Total:		32–25 (.561)			

== NBA head coaching record ==
Legend
Regular season	G	Games coached	W	Games won	L	Games lost	W–L %	Win–loss %
Playoffs	PG	Playoff games	PW	Playoff wins	PL	Playoff losses	PW–L %	Playoff win–loss %

Team	Year	G	W	L	W–L%	Finish	PG	PW	PL	PW–L%	Result
New York	1989–90	82	45	37	.549	3rd in Atlantic	10	4	6	.400	Lost in Conference semifinals
New York	1990–91	15	7	8	.467	(fired)	—	—	—	—	–
Vancouver	1996–97	39	6	33	.154	7th in Midwest	—	—	—	—	Missed playoffs
Career		136	58	78	.426		10	4	6	.400	
