= Doug Edwards (basketball) =

American basketball player (born 1971)

Personal information
- Born: January 21, 1971 (age 55) Miami, Florida, U.S.
- Listed height: 6 ft 7 in (2.01 m)
- Listed weight: 235 lb (107 kg)

Career information
- High school: Miami Senior (Miami, Florida)
- College: Florida State (1990–1993)
- NBA draft: 1993: 1st round, 15th overall pick
- Drafted by: Atlanta Hawks
- Playing career: 1993–1996
- Position: Small forward
- Number: 34, 32

Career history
- 1993–1995: Atlanta Hawks
- 1995–1996: Vancouver Grizzlies

Career highlights
- 2× Second-team All-ACC (1992, 1993); First-team Parade All-American (1989); McDonald's All-American (1989); Florida Mr. Basketball (1989)
- Stats at NBA.com
- Stats at Basketball Reference

Douglas Edwards (born January 21, 1971) is an American former professional basketball player who was selected by the Atlanta Hawks in the first round (15th pick overall) of the 1993 NBA draft. Edwards played for the Hawks and Vancouver Grizzlies in 3 NBA seasons, averaging 2.4 ppg. He played collegiately at Florida State University. Edwards gained his nickname "Doughboy" while playing in Vancouver. On September 10, 2008, Frank Martin announced the addition of Edwards to his coaching staff at Kansas State University. He has two brothers, both former basketball players: Steven (b. 1973) and Allen (b. 1975).

== Coaching career ==
In May 2022, Edwards was hired as the Director of Player Personnel and Special Assistant to the Head Coach for University of Massachusetts Amherst.
