= Vancouver Grizzlies =

Defunct professional basketball team (1995–2001)

- Conference: Western
- Division: Midwest
- Founded: 1995
- History: Vancouver Grizzlies; 1995–2001; Memphis Grizzlies; 2001–present
- Arena: General Motors Place
- Location: Vancouver, British Columbia
- Team colors: Turquoise, bronze, red, black
- General manager: Stu Jackson (1994–2000); Billy Knight (2000–2001)
- Head coach: Brian Winters (1995–1997); Stu Jackson (1997); Brian Hill (1997–1999); Lionel Hollins (1999–2000); Sidney Lowe (2000–2001)
- Ownership: Orca Bay Sports and Entertainment (1995–2000); Michael Heisley (2000–2001)
- Championships: 0
- Conference titles: 0
- Division titles: 0
Home	Road

The Vancouver Grizzlies were a Canadian professional basketball team based in Vancouver. The Grizzlies competed in the National Basketball Association (NBA) as a member of the Midwest Division of the Western Conference. The team was established in 1995, along with the Toronto Raptors, as part of the NBA's expansion into Canada. Following the 2000–01 season, the team relocated to Memphis, Tennessee, United States, and was renamed the Memphis Grizzlies. The Grizzlies played their home games at General Motors Place (now Rogers Arena) for all of their six seasons in Vancouver.

Like most expansion teams, the Grizzlies struggled in their early years. The team finished last in their division in all but one season (1997-98 Denver Nuggets), and never won more than 30% of its games in any of the team's seasons in Vancouver. In total, the team won 101 games, lost 359, and never qualified for the NBA playoffs. The two expansion teams were denied early draft picks in the first season, but the Grizzlies secured Shareef Abdur-Rahim in 1996 and Mike Bibby with the second pick of the 1998 NBA draft. The team continued to lose games despite high draft picks. After they selected Steve Francis as second pick in 1999, he refused to play in Vancouver and was traded away. After the 1998–99 lockout, lower attendance and a weak Canadian dollar caused the owner Orca Bay Sports and Entertainment to lose money on the franchise. After a failed attempt to sell the team to Bill Laurie, it was instead sold to Michael Heisley and subsequently moved to Memphis, Tennessee, for the 2001–02 season.

== History ==
=== Establishment ===
The only former professional basketball team to play in Canada was the Toronto Huskies, who played a single season in 1946–47 before folding. Attempts had been made by Nelson Skalbania, a local entrepreneur, to get an NBA franchise to Vancouver in the 1980s, but had failed. Arthur Griffiths, owner of the Vancouver Canucks of the National Hockey League (NHL) through Northwest Sports Enterprises, announced in February 1993 that he hoped to bring an NBA franchise to Vancouver. Griffiths was developing a privately owned 20,000-seat arena for the Canucks in downtown Vancouver, which was scheduled for completion for the 1995–96 season. The Toronto Raptors were awarded an expansion franchise for that season on September 30, 1993. On February 14, 1994, the NBA's Expansion Committee gave a preliminary approval for Vancouver, with full approval being granted by the Board of Governors on 27 April. Both franchises paid a fee of US$125 million, up from $32.5 million paid during the 1988–89 expansion. The Grizzlies became the NBA's 29th franchise.

One hindrance for the expansion was that the NBA wanted the province of British Columbia to abolish wagering on Grizzlies games, specifically by removing the games from the Sports Actions betting. NBA betting accounted for CA$1.56 million in 1993, with the profits going to provincial health care. Similar demands were laid forward in Ontario. There was large public opposition against the league's demands. This issue was resolved on February 9, 1994, after the franchise company agreed to donate $500,000 per year to health care.

The company hired Stu Jackson as general manager on 22 July, who was at the time head coach of the University of Wisconsin Badgers and, previously, head coach for the New York Knicks. Jackson started by hiring a scouting department headed by Larry Riley. Original proposals were for the team to be called the Vancouver Mounties, but objections from the Royal Canadian Mounted Police forced the team to find a new name, which was announced on 11 August, named for the bear indigenous to British Columbia. The team colors were announced to be turquoise, bronze and red.

The Grizzlies were the first NBA team to have a website, which was created in 1995 by Bob Kerstein, Chief Information Officer of the Grizzlies at the time. Josh Davis was credited with designing the Vancouver Grizzlies logo in 1995.

To start playing, the team needed to have sold 12,500 season tickets with 50 percent payment prior to January 1, 1995. This was a number higher than that of the Canucks, and both Orlando Magic and Minnesota Timberwolves had seen problems reaching 10,000 during the 1989 expansion. On December 21, 1994, only about 10,000 tickets had been sold when Shoppers Drug Mart purchased the necessary 2,500 tickets to push the team over the limit, in a deal similar to what was necessary in Toronto. On March 7, 1995, the majority of the holding company was sold from Griffiths to Seattle-based John McCaw, Jr. Griffiths and McCaw, Jr. proceeded to create a parent company for the Canucks, Grizzlies and the General Motors Place, which at first was baptized Northwest Entertainment Group, but got renamed in August as Orca Bay Sports and Entertainment. Brian Winters was announced as head coach on 19 June. Winters had spent the past nine seasons as an assistant under Lenny Wilkens with the Atlanta Hawks and Cleveland Cavaliers. Prior to the draft, the team signed free agent Kevin Pritchard, the team's first player.

Five days later, the Grizzlies and Raptors attended the 1995 NBA expansion draft. Each of the 27 NBA teams could protect eight of their players, and the two expansion teams could select one unprotected player from each team. Vancouver won the coin flip, and opted for a better position in the upcoming draft, allowing the Raptors the first pick. Vancouver's first pick was Knicks' point guard Greg Anthony; other top players were guards Byron Scott and Gerald Wilkins, and swingman Blue Edwards. The team also selected forward Kenny Gattison, centre Benoit Benjamin, forward Larry Stewart, Rodney Dent, Antonio Harvey, Reggie Slater, Trevor Ruffin, Derrick Phelps and Doug Edwards.

Both the Canadian teams were hampered by the NBA's decision to deny them one of the top five picks in the draft. The teams would not be allowed a top draft pick in the following three seasons, even if they should win the lottery. The teams were also hindered from using their full salary cap the first two seasons. In the first draft, the Grizzlies were sixth and selected centre Bryant Reeves. Although a solid player, he failed both at carrying the team and, lacking creative style, did not help draw up attendance.

=== Six seasons ===
Every year, except the 1998–99 season, the Grizzlies played the Raptors in the pre-season Naismith Cup, held at a neutral venue in Canada. The Grizzlies' first official contest was against the Portland Trail Blazers; both the first game and the following game against the Timberwolves were won. The team followed up by losing 19 straight games, and later set the NBA single-season record of 23 straight losses in February to April (a record since bested by the Cleveland Cavaliers, Detroit Pistons and Philadelphia 76ers). The season ended with 15 wins and 67 losses—the .196 winning percentage being the lowest in the whole league. The team saw an average attendance of 17,183 spectators, 14th in the NBA.

Shareef Abdur-Rahim was selected third overall by the Grizzlies in the 1996 NBA draft. The Grizzlies also traded for Anthony Peeler and George Lynch from the Los Angeles Lakers on July 16, 1996. Abdur-Rahim made an immediate impact playing for the Grizzlies, becoming the team's leading scorer while setting a franchise record of 18.7 points per game (ppg). He finished third in balloting for the NBA Rookie of the Year and was picked for the NBA All-Rookie First Team. By the end of the 1996–97 season, Abdur-Rahim led the team in scoring on 33 occasions, rebounding on 23 occasions. Despite these acquisitions, Brian Winters was removed as head coach after 43 games of the 1996–97 season, and replaced for the remainder of the season by Stu Jackson. The Grizzlies went on to win only 14 games that season, again the worst in the whole league.

The 1997–98 season saw the hiring of Brian Hill as head coach. In the draft, Vancouver selected Antonio Daniels with the fourth pick. The team traded to get Otis Thorpe for the 2003 first-round draft pick and Sam Mack for Rodrick Rhodes. Both would play a single season for the Grizzlies. The team won 19 games, placing the sixth in the division, ahead of the Denver Nuggets, and 25th overall in the league.

Ahead of the 1998–99 Vancouver Grizzlies season, the Grizzlies signed free agent Cherokee Parks and traded Daniels for the Spurs' Felipe López and Carl Herrera. In the draft, the Grizzlies selected Mike Bibby with the second overall pick. During the 1998–99 season, Abdur-Rahim elevated his performance with 23.0 ppg, the highest season average of his career. Due to the 1998–99 NBA lockout, the season was reduced to only 50 games. As a result, the league's average attendance dropped that season. Vancouver actually registered a slight increase in attendance. This was despite the team finishing with 8 wins and 42 losses, yielding the all-time low winning percentage of .160.

The Grizzlies again had second pick in the 1999 draft. Despite having an all-star caliber point guard in Mike Bibby, they selected Steve Francis. He had hoped to be selected first by the Chicago Bulls, and his managers had several times indicated that he was not interested in playing in Vancouver. He relented and briefly considered joining the Grizzlies, but after an incident at the airport, his manager Jeffrey Fried started trying to get him traded. In what became the biggest deal till then in NBA history, involving eleven players and three teams, Francis and Tony Massenburg were sent to Houston, Michael Smith, Lee Mayberry, Rodrick Rhodes and Makhtar N'Diaye were sent to Orlando Magic, while the Grizzlies received forwards Othella Harrington and Antoine Carr, guards Michael Dickerson and Brent Price, first- and second-round draft picks and cash. Francis would go on to win the Rookie of the Year Award, and was harassed both verbally and physically by fans when he played in Vancouver.

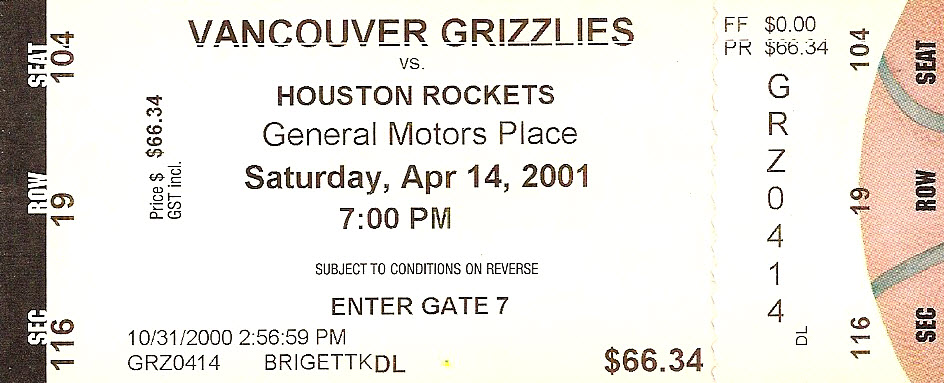
A ticket from the Grizzlies' final home game in Vancouver

The 1999–2000 season saw Lionel Hollins take over as coach after 22 games, after Hill had only four wins. The season ended with 22 wins and 60 losses, placing the Grizzlies last in the division. The season also saw a large drop in attendance, averaging 13,899, ranking the team 27th in the league. Hollins was relieved as head coach following the 1999–2000 season. He would later serve two additional stints as head coach of the Grizzlies following their move to Memphis, thus making him head coach of the team on three occasions.

For the 2000–01 season, the team's final season in Vancouver, Sidney Lowe was hired as head coach. Forward Stromile Swift was selected as the second-overall pick in the draft. Despite finishing with a franchise-best 23 wins and 59 losses, the team still finished last in the division. The team's final home game at GM Place was against the Rockets on April 14, 2001. The team's final game as the Vancouver Grizzlies was a 95–81 win against the Golden State Warriors on April 18, 2001.

=== Relocation ===
Financially, the lockout that occurred in 1998 was the turning point for the team. Attendance plummeted from a league average of 16,108 in the 1997–98 season to 13,899 in the 1999–2000 season, which was the third-lowest in the league. Orca Bay started losing money on operations, in part because of a weak Canadian dollar.

Griffiths sold Orca Bay to Seattle-based John McCaw, Jr. in 1995 and 1996. In September 1999, McCaw announced the sale of the Grizzlies, but not the arena or the Canucks, to NHL's St. Louis Blues owner Bill Laurie for US$200 million. He stated that he intended to move the Grizzlies to St. Louis, but the transaction was stopped by the NBA.

Instead, McCaw sold the team to Chicago-based Michael Heisley for US$160 million. At the time he stated that he intended to keep the team in Vancouver, but immediately started a process to find a suitable relocation city in the US. Cities considered for relocation of the team included Memphis, Nashville, Las Vegas, New Orleans, Tampa, Anaheim, San Diego, Buffalo and Louisville. Despite the need for the construction of a new venue to house the team on a permanent basis, Memphis was announced as the recipient city (pending league approval) on March 26, 2001. The NBA Board of Governors approved the move on July 3, 2001.

The last Vancouver Grizzlies player on Memphis' active roster was Stromile Swift, who last played for the team in the 2007-08 season, though he played for Houston in the 2005–06 season before returning to Memphis. The last active Vancouver Grizzlies player in the NBA was Mike Bibby, who retired after playing for the New York Knicks following the conclusion of the 2011–12 season.

== Uniforms ==
The Vancouver Grizzlies' original uniforms featured Indigenous imagery and red accents on the piping. Home uniforms were white with turquoise letters and black and bronze trim, while road uniforms were turquoise with white letters and black and bronze trim. The front of the uniform featured the full team name from the logo, while the "howling bear" alternate was emblazoned on the left leg. The "ball and claws" logo is also added to the beltline.

In the 1997–98 season, the Grizzlies added a black alternate uniform, featuring only the city name in front and thick turquoise and thin red stripes. Letters were in white with red and turquoise trim. The alternate "G-bear" logo is on the right leg, while the "paw" logo is on the beltline. The "ball and claws" logo was moved below the neckline. This uniform would become the primary for the 2000–01 season. A corresponding white uniform, with the team name and letters in black with red and turquoise trim, was also unveiled that season.

Both original Vancouver Grizzlies uniforms have since been brought back by the current Memphis Grizzlies in the 2019–20 (turquoise) and 2024–25 (white) seasons, as part of the Grizzlies franchise's 25th and 30th anniversaries respectively.

== Venue ==
General Motors Place was host to the Vancouver Grizzlies for all of their games before moving to Memphis, Tennessee. The arena has since changed its name to Rogers Arena.

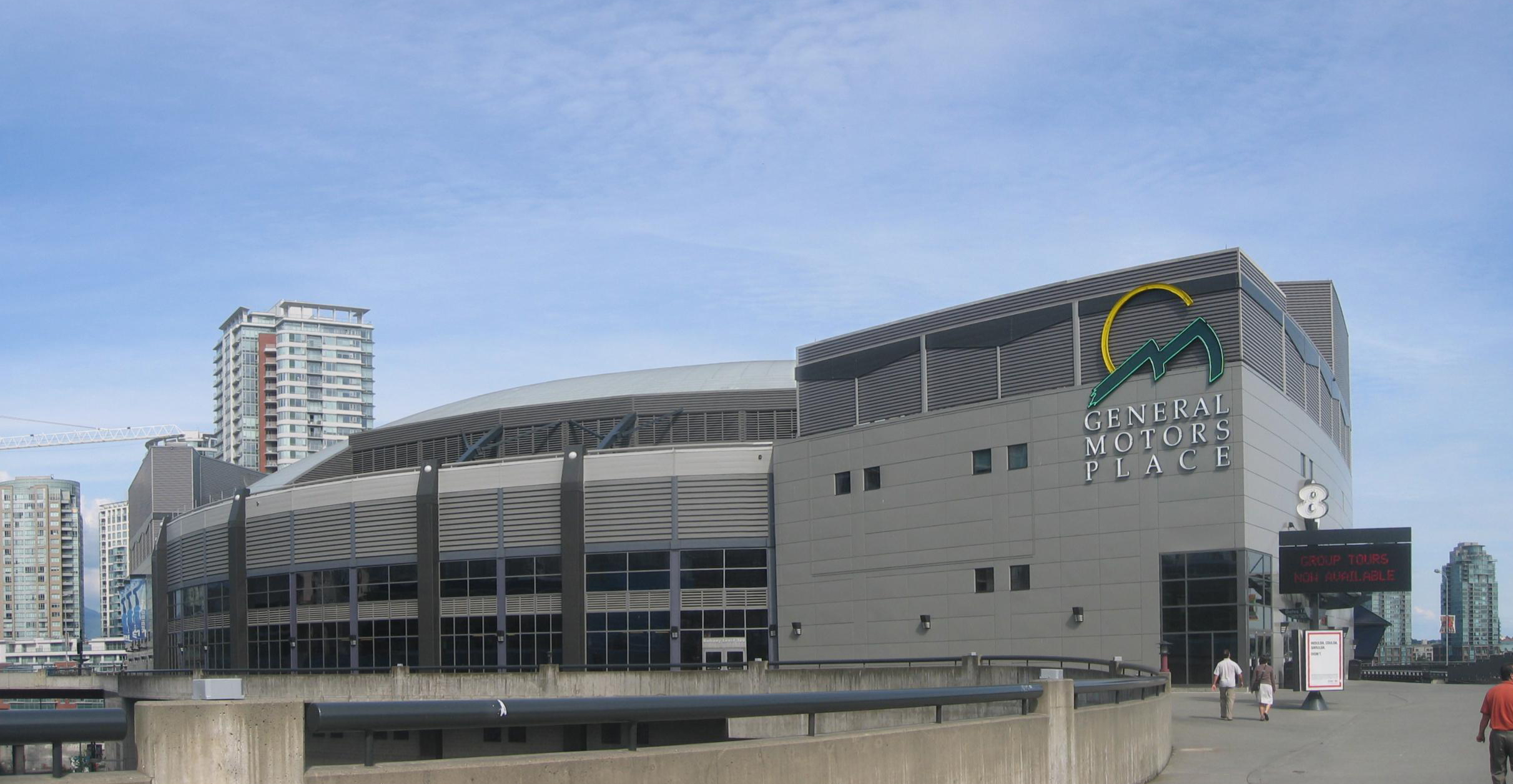
General Motors Place was the home for the Vancouver Grizzlies

== Season-by-season record ==
While in Vancouver, the Grizzlies played in the Midwest Division of the Western Conference.

Season	Regular season					Postseason	Attendance	Ref
Season	Pos	GP	W	L	Win%	Postseason	Attendance	Ref
1995–96	7th	82	15	67	.183	—	17,183	
1996–97	7th	82	14	68	.171	—	16,571	
1997–98	6th	82	19	63	.232	—	16,108	
1998–99	7th	50	8	42	.160	—	16,718	
1999–00	7th	82	22	60	.268	—	13,899	
2000–01	7th	82	23	59	.280	—	13,737	

== Head coaches ==
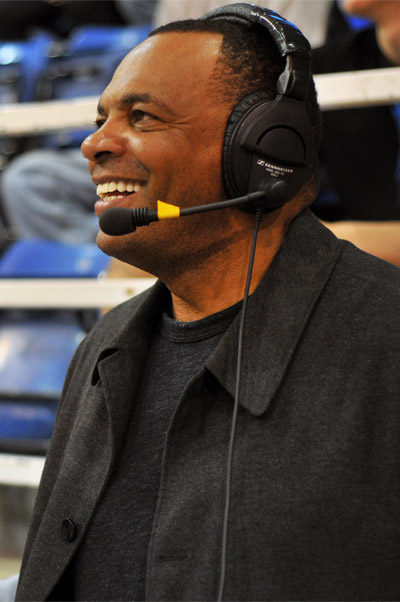
Lionel Hollins was the interim coach of the Grizzlies during their 1999–2000 campaign in Vancouver. After the move to Memphis, he served a second stint as interim coach in 2004. He then served as full-time coach from the 2009–10 season through the 2012–13 season.

Five people have been head coach for the Vancouver Grizzlies. The following lists the Grizzlies coaches while in Vancouver. It contains games coached (GC), wins (W), losses (L), winning percentage (Win%) and number as coach (#).

#	Name	Term	GC	W	L	Win%	Ref
1	Brian Winters	1995–1997	184	36	148	.196	
2	Stu Jackson	1997	39	6	33	.154	
3	Brian Hill	1997–1999	154	31	123	.201	
4	Lionel Hollins	1999–2000	60	18	42	.300	
5	Sidney Lowe	2000–2001	82	23	59	.280	

== Cultural depictions ==
The team has been the subject of two documentary films by Vancouver filmmaker Kathleen Jayme: Finding Big Country (2018) and The Grizzlie Truth (2022).
