= Midwest Division (NBA) =

US National Basketball Association Western conference division

- Conference: Western Conference
- League: National Basketball Association
- Sport: Basketball
- First season: 1970–71 season
- Folded: 2003–04 season
- Most titles: San Antonio Spurs (11 titles)

The Midwest Division was a division in the Western Conference of the National Basketball Association (NBA). The division was created at the start of the 1970–71 season, when the league expanded from 14 to 17 teams with the addition of the Buffalo Braves, the Cleveland Cavaliers and the Portland Trail Blazers. The league realigned itself into two conferences, the Western Conference and the Eastern Conference, with two divisions in each conference. The Midwest Division began with four inaugural members, the Chicago Bulls, the Detroit Pistons, the Milwaukee Bucks and the Phoenix Suns. The Bulls and the Suns joined from the Western Division, while the Pistons and the Bucks joined from the Eastern Division.

The division was disbanded when the league expanded from 29 to 30 teams with the addition of the Charlotte Bobcats at the start of the 2004–05 season. The league realigned itself into two conferences with three divisions each. The Midwest Division was replaced with two new divisions, the Southwest Division and the Northwest Division. The 2003–04 season, the division's last season, consisted of seven teams, the Dallas Mavericks, the Denver Nuggets, the Houston Rockets, the Memphis Grizzlies, the Minnesota Timberwolves, the San Antonio Spurs and the Utah Jazz. The Mavericks, the Rockets, the Grizzlies and the Spurs joined the Southwest Division, while the Nuggets, the Timberwolves and the Jazz joined the Northwest Division.

The Denver Nuggets played 28 seasons in the Midwest Division, longer than any other team. Three teams, the Heat, the Magic and the Charlotte Hornets, only played one season each in the division. None of the four inaugural members remained when the division was disbanded in 2004.

Despite the name, the division was made up mostly of teams who were located far outside the Midwest from 1980 to 2004.

== Results ==
The San Antonio Spurs won the most Midwest Division titles with eleven. The Milwaukee Bucks and the Utah Jazz won the second most titles with six. However, the Bucks won those six titles in only ten seasons before they left the division. The 34th and last division champion was the Minnesota Timberwolves. Seven division champions had or tied for the best regular season record during the season.

Five NBA champions came from the Midwest Division. The Spurs and the Houston Rockets won two championships each, while the Bucks won one championship. All of them, except the 1994–95 Rockets, were division champions.

The Midwest Division twice had six teams qualified for the playoffs. In the 1985–86 season, all six teams from the division qualified for the playoffs, while in the 2003–04 season, six of seven teams qualified for the playoffs. In the division's first and last season, all teams in the division had winning percentages above 0.500 (50%).

== Teams ==
Team	City	Year	From	Year	To	Current division
Team	City	Joined		Left		Current division
Charlotte Hornets (1988–2002; 2004–present)	Charlotte, North Carolina	1989	Atlantic Division	1990	Central Division	Southeast Division
Chicago Bulls	Chicago, Illinois	1970	Western Division	1980	Central Division	Central Division
Dallas Mavericks	Dallas, Texas	1980	—†	2004	Southwest Division	Southwest Division
Denver Nuggets	Denver, Colorado	1976	ABA‡	2004	Northwest Division	Northwest Division
Detroit Pistons	Detroit, Michigan	1970	Eastern Division	1978	Central Division	Central Division
Houston Rockets	Houston, Texas	1980	Central Division	2004	Southwest Division	Southwest Division
Indiana Pacers	Indianapolis, Indiana	1976	ABA‡	1979	Central Division	Central Division
Memphis Grizzlies (2001–present); Vancouver Grizzlies (1995–2001)	Memphis, Tennessee; Vancouver, British Columbia	1995	—†	2004	Southwest Division	Southwest Division
Miami Heat	Miami, Florida	1988	—†	1989	Atlantic Division	Southeast Division
Milwaukee Bucks	Milwaukee, Wisconsin	1970	Eastern Division	1980	Central Division	Central Division
Minnesota Timberwolves	Minneapolis, Minnesota	1989	—†	2004	Northwest Division	Northwest Division
Orlando Magic	Orlando, Florida	1990	Central Division	1991	Atlantic Division	Southeast Division
Phoenix Suns	Phoenix, Arizona	1970	Western Division	1972	Pacific Division	Pacific Division
Sacramento Kings (1985–present); Kansas City Kings (1975–1985); Kansas City-Omaha Kings (1972–1975)	Sacramento, California; Kansas City, Missouri; Kansas City, Missouri and Omaha, Nebraska	1972	Central Division (as Cincinnati Royals)	1988	Pacific Division	Pacific Division
San Antonio Spurs	San Antonio, Texas	1980	Central Division	2004	Southwest Division	Southwest Division
Utah Jazz	Salt Lake City, Utah	1979	Central Division (as New Orleans Jazz)	2004	Northwest Division	Northwest Division

Notes

- † denotes an expansion team.
- ‡ denotes a team that merged from the American Basketball Association (ABA).

== Division champions ==
^	Had or tied for the best regular season record for that season

Season	Team	Record	Playoffs result
1970–71	Milwaukee Bucks^	66–16 (.805)	Won NBA Finals
1971–72	Milwaukee Bucks	63–19 (.768)	Lost conference finals
1972–73	Milwaukee Bucks	60–22 (.732)	Lost conference semifinals
1973–74	Milwaukee Bucks^	59–23 (.720)	Lost NBA Finals
1974–75	Chicago Bulls	47–35 (.573)	Lost conference finals
1975–76	Milwaukee Bucks	38–44 (.463)	Lost First round
1976–77	Denver Nuggets	50–32 (.610)	Lost conference semifinals
1977–78	Denver Nuggets	48–34 (.585)	Lost conference finals
1978–79	Kansas City Kings	48–34 (.585)	Lost conference semifinals
1979–80	Milwaukee Bucks	49–33 (.598)	Lost conference semifinals
1980–81	San Antonio Spurs	52–30 (.634)	Lost conference semifinals
1981–82	San Antonio Spurs	48–34 (.585)	Lost conference finals
1982–83	San Antonio Spurs	53–29 (.646)	Lost conference finals
1983–84	Utah Jazz	45–37 (.549)	Lost conference semifinals
1984–85	Denver Nuggets	52–30 (.634)	Lost conference finals
1985–86	Houston Rockets	51–31 (.622)	Lost NBA Finals
1986–87	Dallas Mavericks	55–27 (.671)	Lost First round
1987–88	Denver Nuggets	54–28 (.659)	Lost conference semifinals
1988–89	Utah Jazz	51–31 (.622)	Lost First round
1989–90	San Antonio Spurs	56–26 (.683)	Lost conference semifinals
1990–91	San Antonio Spurs	55–27 (.671)	Lost First round
1991–92	Utah Jazz	55–27 (.671)	Lost conference finals
1992–93	Houston Rockets	55–27 (.671)	Lost conference semifinals
1993–94	Houston Rockets	58–24 (.707)	Won NBA Finals
1994–95	San Antonio Spurs^	62–20 (.756)	Lost conference finals
1995–96	San Antonio Spurs	59–23 (.720)	Lost conference semifinals
1996–97	Utah Jazz	64–18 (.780)	Lost NBA Finals
1997–98	Utah Jazz^	62–20 (.756)	Lost NBA Finals
1998–99^{[a]}	San Antonio Spurs^	37–13 (.740)	Won NBA Finals
1999–00	Utah Jazz	55–27 (.671)	Lost conference semifinals
2000–01	San Antonio Spurs^	58–24 (.707)	Lost conference finals
2001–02	San Antonio Spurs	58–24 (.707)	Lost conference semifinals
2002–03	San Antonio Spurs^	60–22 (.732)	Won NBA Finals
2003–04	Minnesota Timberwolves	58–24 (.707)	Lost conference finals

=== Titles by team ===
Team	Titles	Season(s) won
San Antonio Spurs	11	1980–81, 1981–82, 1982–83, 1989–90, 1990–91, 1994–95, 1995–96, 1998–99, 2000–01, 2001–02, 2002–03
Milwaukee Bucks	6	1970–71, 1971–72, 1972–73, 1973–74, 1975–76, 1979–80
Utah Jazz	6	1983–84, 1988–89, 1991–92, 1996–97, 1997–98, 1999–00
Denver Nuggets	4	1976–77, 1977–78, 1984–85, 1987–88
Houston Rockets	3	1985–86, 1992–93, 1993–94
Chicago Bulls	1	1974–75
Kansas City Kings (now Sacramento Kings)	1	1978–79
Dallas Mavericks	1	1986–87
Minnesota Timberwolves	1	2003–04

== Season results ==
^	Denotes team that won the NBA championships
^{+}	Denotes team that won the Conference finals, but lost the NBA Finals
*	Denotes team that qualified for the NBA Playoffs

Season	Team (record)						
Season	1st	2nd	3rd	4th	5th	6th	7th
1970: The Midwest Division was formed with four inaugural members. The Chicago Bulls and the Phoenix Suns joined from the Western Division, while the Detroit Pistons and the Milwaukee Bucks joined from the Eastern Division.
1970–71	Milwaukee^ (66–16)	Chicago* (51–31)	Phoenix (48–34)	Detroit (45–37)	—	—	—
1971–72	Milwaukee* (63–19)	Chicago* (57–25)	Phoenix (49–33)	Detroit (26–56)	—	—	—
1972: The Cincinnati Royals, who relocated and became the Kansas City-Omaha Kings, joined from the Central Division. The Phoenix Suns left to join the Pacific Division.
1972–73	Milwaukee* (60–22)	Chicago* (51–31)	Detroit (40–42)	Kansas City-Omaha (36–46)	—	—	—
1973–74	Milwaukee^{+} (59–23)	Chicago* (54–28)	Detroit* (52–30)	Kansas City-Omaha (33–49)	—	—	—
1974–75	Chicago* (47–35)	Detroit* (44–38)	Kansas City-Omaha* (40–42)	Milwaukee (38–44)	—	—	—
1975: The Kansas City-Omaha Kings were renamed the Kansas City Kings.
1975–76	Milwaukee* (38–44)	Detroit* (36–46)	Kansas City (31–51)	Chicago (24–58)	—	—	—
1976: Two American Basketball Association (ABA) teams that merged with the NBA, the Denver Nuggets and the Indiana Pacers, joined the division.
1976–77	Denver (50–32)*	Detroit* (44–38)	Chicago* (44–38)	Kansas City (40–42)	Indiana (36–46)	Milwaukee (30–52)	—
1977–78	Denver* (48–34)	Milwaukee* (44–38)	Chicago (40–42)	Detroit (38–44)	Kansas City (31–51)	Indiana (31–51)	—
1978: The Detroit Pistons left to join the Central Division.
1978–79	Kansas City* (48–34)	Denver* (47–35)	Milwaukee (38–44)	Indiana (38–44)	Chicago (31–51)	—	—
1979: The New Orleans Jazz, who relocated and became the Utah Jazz, joined from the Central Division. The Indiana Pacers left to join the Central Division.
1979–80	Milwaukee* (49–33)	Kansas City* (47–35)	Denver (30–52)	Chicago (30–52)	Utah (24–58)	—	—
1980: An expansion team, the Dallas Mavericks, joined the division. The Houston Rockets and the San Antonio Spurs joined from the Central Division. The Chicago Bulls and the Milwaukee Bucks left to join the Central Division.
1980–81	San Antonio* (52–30)	Kansas City* (40–42)	Houston^{+} (40–42)	Denver (37–45)	Utah (28–54)	Dallas (15–67)	—
1981–82	San Antonio* (48–34)	Denver* (46–36)	Houston* (46–36)	Kansas City (30–52)	Dallas (28–54)	Utah (25–57)	—
1982–83	San Antonio* (53–29)	Denver* (45–37)	Kansas City (45–37)	Dallas (38–44)	Utah (30–52)	Houston (14–68)	—
1983–84	Utah* (45–37)	Dallas* (43–39)	Denver* (38–44)	Kansas City* (38–44)	San Antonio (37–45)	Houston (29–53)	—
1984–85	Denver* (52–30)	Houston* (48–34)	Dallas* (44–38)	Utah* (41–41)	San Antonio* (41–41)	Kansas City (31–51)	—
1985: The Kansas City Kings relocated and became the Sacramento Kings.
1985–86	Houston^{+} (51–31)	Denver* (47–35)	Dallas* (44–38)	Utah* (42–40)	Sacramento* (37–45)	San Antonio* (35–47)	—
1986–87	Dallas* (55–27)	Utah* (44–38)	Houston* (42–40)	Denver* (37–45)	Sacramento (29–53)	San Antonio (28–54)	—
1987–88	Denver* (54–28)	Dallas* (53–29)	Utah* (47–35)	Houston* (46–36)	San Antonio* (31–51)	Sacramento (24–58)	—
1988: An expansion team, the Miami Heat, joined the division temporarily for one season. The Sacramento Kings left to join the Pacific Division.
1988–89	Utah* (51–31)	Houston* (45–37)	Denver* (44–38)	Dallas (38–44)	San Antonio (21–61)	Miami (15–67)	—
1989: An expansion team, the Minnesota Timberwolves, joined the division. The Charlotte Hornets joined temporarily for one season from the Atlantic Division. The Miami Heat left to join the Atlantic Division.
1989–90	San Antonio* (56–26)	Utah* (55–27)	Dallas* (47–35)	Denver* (43–39)	Houston* (41–41)	Minnesota (22–60)	Charlotte (19–63)
1990: The Orlando Magic joined temporarily for one season from the Central Division. The Charlotte Hornets left to join the Central Division.
1990–91	San Antonio* (55–27)	Utah* (54–28)	Houston* (52–30)	Orlando (31–51)	Minnesota (29–53)	Dallas (28–54)	Denver (20–62)
1991: The Orlando Magic left to join the Atlantic Division.
1991–92	Utah* (55–27)	San Antonio* (47–35)	Houston (42–40)	Denver (24–58)	Dallas (22–60)	Minnesota (15–67)	—
1992–93	Houston* (55–27)	San Antonio* (49–33)	Utah* (47–35)	Denver (36–46)	Minnesota (19–63)	Dallas (11–71)	—
1993–94	Houston^ (58–24)	San Antonio* (55–27)	Utah* (53–29)	Denver* (42–40)	Minnesota (20–62)	Dallas (13–69)	—
1994–95	San Antonio* (62–20)	Utah* (60–22)	Houston^ (47–35)	Denver* (41–41)	Dallas (36–46)	Minnesota (21–61)	—
1995: An expansion team, the Vancouver Grizzlies, joined the division.
1995–96	San Antonio* (59–23)	Utah* (55–27)	Houston* (48–34)	Denver (35–47)	Minnesota (26–56)	Dallas (26–56)	Vancouver (15–67)
1996–97	Utah^{+} (64–18)	Houston* (57–25)	Minnesota* (40–42)	Dallas (24–58)	Denver (21–61)	San Antonio (20–62)	Vancouver (14–68)
1997–98	Utah^{+} (62–20)	San Antonio* (56–26)	Minnesota* (45–37)	Houston* (41–41)	Dallas (20–62)	Vancouver (19–63)	Denver (11–71)
1998–99^{[a]}	San Antonio^ (37–13)	Utah* (37–13)	Houston* (31–19)	Minnesota* (27–23)	Dallas (19–31)	Denver (14–36)	Vancouver (8–42)
1999–00	Utah* (55–27)	San Antonio* (53–29)	Minnesota* (50–32)	Dallas (40–42)	Denver (35–47)	Houston (34–48)	Vancouver (22–60)
2000–01	San Antonio* (58–24)	Utah* (53–29)	Dallas* (53–29)	Minnesota* (47–35)	Houston (45–37)	Denver (40–42)	Vancouver (23–59)
2001: The Vancouver Grizzlies relocated and became the Memphis Grizzlies.
2001–02	San Antonio* (58–24)	Dallas* (57–25)	Minnesota* (50–32)	Utah* (44–38)	Houston (28–54)	Denver (27–55)	Memphis (23–59)
2002–03	San Antonio^ (60–22)	Dallas* (60–22)	Minnesota* (51–31)	Utah* (47–35)	Houston (43–39)	Memphis (28–54)	Denver (17–65)
2003–04	Minnesota* (58–24)	San Antonio* (57–25)	Dallas* (52–30)	Memphis* (50–32)	Houston* (45–37)	Denver* (43–39)	Utah (42–40)
2004: The Denver Nuggets, the Minnesota Timberwolves and the Utah Jazz left to join the Northwest Division. The Dallas Mavericks, the Houston Rockets, the Memphis Grizzlies, and the San Antonio Spurs left to join the Southwest Division.

== See also ==
- Atlantic Division (NBA)
- Pacific Division (NBA)
- Southwest Division (NBA)
- Central Division (NBA)

== Notes ==
- ^{a 1} ^{2} Because of a lockout, the season did not start until February 5, 1999, and all 29 teams played a shortened 50-game regular season schedule.
