= Professional sports leagues in the United States =

Professional sports leagues in the United States includes major professional sports leagues, other highest-level professional leagues, and minor leagues.

Based on revenue, the major professional sports leagues in the United States comprise the following: Major League Baseball (MLB), the National Basketball Association (NBA), the National Football League (NFL), the National Hockey League (NHL), and Major League Soccer (MLS).

The major sports leagues tend to have the greatest fan interest, have national television contracts, draw high fan attendance, and have teams located throughout the largest metropolitan areas in the United States.

== Major leagues ==
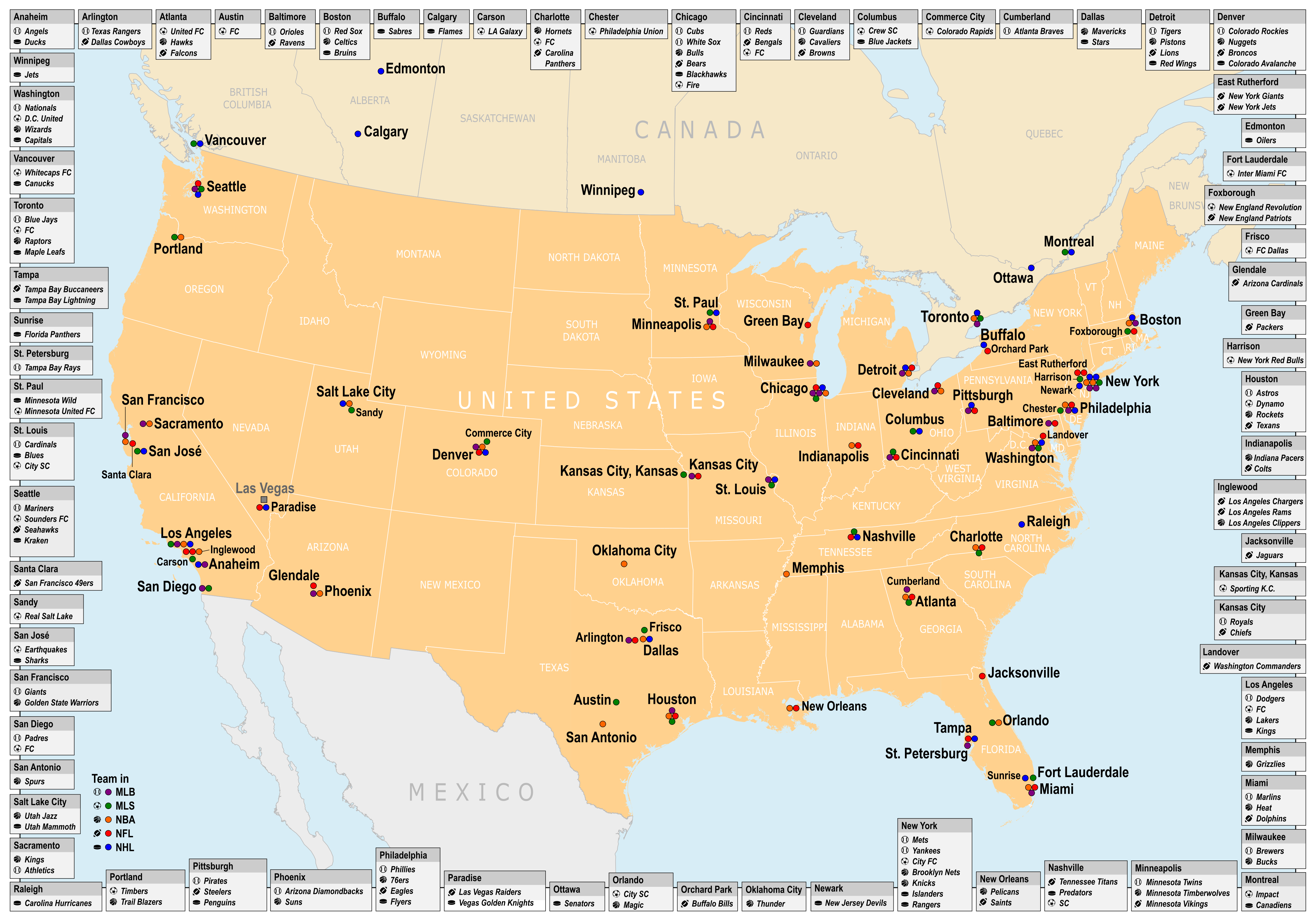
All cities in the United States and Canada with at least one team in MLB, NBA, NFL, NHL, and MLS as of 2025

=== Major League Baseball (MLB) ===
Major League Baseball is the highest level of play of baseball in North America. It consists of the National League (founded in 1876) and the American League (founded in 1901). Cooperation between the two leagues began in 1903, and the two merged on an organizational level in 2000 with the elimination of separate league offices; they have shared a single commissioner since 1920. There are currently 30 member teams, with 29 located in the U.S. and 1 in Canada. Traditionally called the "national pastime", baseball was the first professional sport in the U.S.

=== National Basketball Association (NBA) ===
The National Basketball Association is the premier basketball league in the world. It was founded as the Basketball Association of America in 1946, and adopted its current name in 1949, when the BAA partially absorbed the rival National Basketball League. Four teams from the rival American Basketball Association joined the NBA with the ABA–NBA merger in 1976. It currently has 30 teams, 29 in the United States and 1 in Canada. The NBA is watched by audiences both domestically and internationally.

=== National Football League (NFL) ===
The National Football League was founded in 1920 as a combination of various teams from regional leagues such as the Ohio League, the New York Pro Football League, and the Chicago circuit. The NFL partially absorbed the All-America Football Conference in 1949 and merged with the American Football League in 1970. It has 32 teams, all located in the United States.

NFL games are the most attended of domestic professional leagues in the world in terms of per-game attendance, and the most popular in the U.S. in terms of television ratings and merchandising. Its championship game, the Super Bowl, is the most watched annual event on U.S. television, with Super Bowl LVIII in February 2024 being the single most-watched program in U.S. television history.

The NFL is the only one of the major American leagues not to have a presence in Canada, where the Canadian Football League is the premier professional league in the separate though related sport of Canadian football.

=== National Hockey League (NHL) ===
The National Hockey League is the only one of the major leagues to have been founded in Canada. It was formed in 1917 as a successor to Canada's NHA, the National Hockey Association (founded 1909), taking all but one of the NHA's teams. The NHL partially absorbed the rival World Hockey Association (WHA) in 1979. As of the 2024–25 season there are 32 teams in the NHL, with 25 in the U.S. and 7 in Canada, with the Utah Mammoth joining as an expansion team.

The most popular sports league in Canada, and widely followed across the northern U.S., the NHL has expanded southward in recent decades to attempt to gain a more national following in the United States, in cities such as Dallas, Miami, Nashville, Phoenix, Las Vegas, Raleigh, and Tampa, with varying success. Hockey remains much more popular in the northern states of the U.S. closer to Canada, such as the Upper Midwest (8 NHL teams), New England and the New York to Washington area (6 NHL teams), than in the rest of the United States. The NHL has more Canadian teams (seven) than MLB, MLS, the NBA, and the NFL combined (five).

=== Major League Soccer (MLS) ===
Major League Soccer is the top-level men's professional soccer league in the United States and Canada. As of the 2025 MLS season, the league will have 30 teams — 27 in the United States and 3 in Canada, with the addition of San Diego FC. MLS began play in 1996, its creation a requirement by FIFA for awarding the United States the right to host the 1994 World Cup. MLS is the first major Division I outdoor soccer league in the U.S. or Canada since the North American Soccer League (NASL) operated from 1968 to 1984.

MLS has increased in popularity following the adoption of the Designated Player Rule in 2007, which allowed MLS to sign stars such as David Beckham and Thierry Henry. In 2014, MLS reported an average attendance of 19,148 per game, with total attendance exceeding 6.1 million overall, both breaking previous MLS attendance records. With an average attendance of over 20,000 per game, MLS has the third highest average attendance of any sports league in the U.S. after the National Football League (NFL) and Major League Baseball (MLB), and is the seventh highest attended professional soccer league worldwide.

Nate Silver of the ESPN-owned website FiveThirtyEight has argued that there is a case to be made for the inclusion of MLS in the major professional sports leagues of North America.

The five major professional sports leagues

League	Sport	Year founded	Teams	Last expansion	Last contraction	Revenue US$ (bn)	Average attendance (2022)
Major League Baseball (MLB)	Baseball	1903 (Note: This date reflect the year the modern World Series was first contested, although an earlier version of the Series was contested in the 1880s between the National League and the defunct American Association. The two component leagues of Major League Baseball, the National and American Leagues, were founded in 1876 and 1901 respectively. MLB also celebrates the anniversary of the start of professional baseball in 1869. MLB underwent a major organizational change following the 1920 season when the office of Commissioner of Baseball, with far more significant powers over both leagues than the earlier National Commission that had preceded this office, was established. The AL and NL commenced regular season interleague play in 1997 and fully merged on an organizational level, i.e. they abolished their separate league offices and vested all authority in the office of the Commissioner, after the 1999 season. Since its constituent leagues began co-operation in 1903, MLB has never recognized a third major league or absorbed a rival league, although the proposed Continental League of the early 1960s was only forestalled when the AL and NL added two teams each.)	30	1998	1899 (Note: The elimination of four NL teams following the 1899 season is undoubtedly the most recent occasion where MLB has fielded fewer teams for the following season, however some baseball historians regard the original Baltimore Orioles to have folded outright following the 1902 MLB season, and replaced by an expansion team that eventually became the New York Yankees for the following season, in a manner similar to the NFL's last "contraction" as listed in this table.)	$10.7	26,843
National Basketball Association (NBA)	Basketball	1946 (Note: This date reflects the establishment of the Basketball Association of America, which adopted its current name after absorbing the rival National Basketball League in 1950. Although the NBL predated the BAA by nine seasons, the NBA continues to regard the 1946-47 BAA season (as opposed to the 1937-38 NBL season) to be its inaugural one. The NBA has always awarded an internally-created trophy to its champions - the league adopted the trophy's present design in 1977 and its current name (the Larry O'Brien Championship Trophy) in 1984. The NBA later partially absorbed the rival American Basketball Association (founded in 1967) in 1976.)	30	2004	1954	$8.8	18,007
National Football League (NFL)	American football	1920 (Note: The NFL was originally called the American Professional Football Association and adopted its present name in 1922. Other "founding" dates recognized to be of significance by the NFL include the founding of the American Football League (originally a rival league) in 1960, the establishment of what eventually became the Super Bowl in 1966 and the full merger of the AFL and NFL in 1970. 1966 in particular considered a significant epoch by football historians as the start of the "Super Bowl era" while the 1970 merger remains the only time a rival North American sports league has fully merged into an established league with all of its teams intact and its playing records fully recognized as part of the history of the older league. The NFL had earlier partially absorbed the All-America Football Conference (founded in 1946) in 1950, but unlike the latter case with the AFL it wasn't until 2025 NFL recognized AAFC records.)	32	2002	1952 (Note: This date reflects the demise of the original Dallas Texans, who folded after only one season. However, the Texans were immediately replaced by the Baltimore Colts, meaning the league was not reduced in size for the 1953 season. Although the Colts were awarded the assets (including player contracts) of the Texans, they are considered a separate franchise. The last time the league fielded fewer teams for a subsequent season was after the 1950 season when the original Baltimore Colts (also considered to be unrelated to the modern Colts franchise) folded. Also, the date in the table does not recognize the temporary 1995 suspension of the Cleveland Browns in which the then-extant Cleveland football organization was transferred to what was considered an expansion franchise in Baltimore - because the Browns were later restocked via an expansion draft after a three year absence, the NFL does not consider this event to be a contraction.)	$15.3	69,442
National Hockey League (NHL)	Ice hockey	1917 (Note: The Stanley Cup was first awarded in 1893, but did not become the NHL's de facto championship trophy until 1926. Although the NHL recognizes its founding date as 1917, three of its four charter members had previously been members of the National Hockey Association founded in 1910. Upon its founding, the NHL assumed the NHA's then-extant position as the eastern challenger for the Stanley Cup which at the time was a trophy contested between the champions of the NHA/NHL and various leagues based in Western Canada and the U.S. Pacific Northwest. This arrangement continued until 1926 when the last major western-based league folded, after which the NHL took sole possession of the Stanley Cup to be awarded to its playoff champion ever since. The NHL later partially absorbed the rival World Hockey Association (founded in 1972) in 1979.)	32	2021	1978	$5.1	17,456
Major League Soccer (MLS)	Soccer	1996	30	2025	2014 (Note: This date reflects the demise of Chivas USA. However, two teams were added for the 2015 season. The last time MLS fielded fewer teams for the following season was in 2002, when MLS dropped from 12 teams to 10 after folding both of its Florida franchises (the Miami Fusion and Tampa Bay Mutiny) at the end of the 2001 season.)	$1.1	21,006
Explanatory citations

== Other highest-level professional leagues ==
In addition to the major sports leagues, there are several other highest-level professional sports leagues in the United States. These leagues usually lack TV contracts for popular network TV or mainstream cable channels, draw more modest attendance, and generally pay significantly lower salaries than the major sports leagues.

Highest-level professional leagues (non-major)
League	Sport	First season (Teams)	Current teams	Recent average attendance	Average salaries	Refs
Athlete's Unlimited (AU Pro Basketball)	Women's basketball	2022	N/A		$20,000-$30,000	
Athletes Unlimited Softball League (AUSL)	Softball	2024	6		$35,000-$80,000	
Indoor Football League (IFL)	Arena football	2009	14 (Note: Expanding to 17 teams in 2027.)			
LOVB Pro	Women's volleyball	2025	6 (Note: Expanding to 10 teams in 2027.)		$60,000	
Major Arena Soccer League (MASL)	Indoor soccer	2008	10 (Note: Expanding to 11 teams in 2027.)	2,554 (2019–20)	$15,000-$45,000	
Major League Cricket (MLC)	Twenty20 cricket	2023	6			
Major League Rugby (MLR)	Rugby union	2018 (7)	5	4,125 (2018)	$45,000	
Major League Volleyball (MLV)	Women's volleyball	2024 (7) (Note: Played as the Pro Volleyball Federation)	10 (Note: Does not include 1 team on hiatus.)			
National Lacrosse League (NLL)	Box lacrosse	1987 (4)	12	9,596 (2019)	$19,000	
National Volleyball Association (NVA)	Men's volleyball	2018	12			
National Women's Soccer League (NWSL)	Women's soccer	2013 (8)	16 (Note: Expanding to 18 teams in 2028.)	11,250 (2024)	$65,000 (Note: The NWSL's first collective bargaining agreement with its players' union, reached in 2022, calls for minimum salaries of $35,000. Stated salaries do not include allowances for health care, transportation, and housing.)	
Premier Lacrosse League (PLL)	Field lacrosse	2019 (6)	8		$35,000	
Professional Women's Hockey League (PWHL)	Women's ice hockey	2023–24 (6) (Note: The first season was billed as the 2023–24 season, but was played entirely within calendar 2024.)	8 (Note: Includes four Canadian teams.) (Note: Expanding to 12 teams in 2026–27, with one new team in Canada and 3 in the U.S.)	9,304 (2026)	$72,000	
Ultimate Frisbee Association (UFA)	Ultimate	2012	22			
Unrivaled	Women's 3x3 Basketball	2023	8		$220,000	
Women's Lacrosse League (WLL)	Women's Lacrosse	2025	4		$5,000	
Women's National Basketball Association (WNBA)	Women's basketball	1997 (8)	15 (Note: Expanding by 1 team each season from 2028 to 2030.)	9,807 (2024)	$72,000	
Women's Pro Baseball League (WPBL)	Women's baseball	2026 (4)	4		~$6,300 (Note: Teams operate under a $95,000 salary cap with 15-player rosters; players are paid per game. The 2026 season was played entirely at a single venue in Springfield, Illinois.)	

=== Major League Cricket (MLC) ===
Major League Cricket (MLC) is a professional Twenty20 cricket league in the United States. Operated by American Cricket Enterprises (ACE) and sanctioned by USA Cricket, it plans to begin play in 2023, with six teams in major U.S. cities under a single-entity model. In 2021, the development league for MLC, Minor League Cricket (MiLC), completed its inaugural season, which was contested by 27 franchise-based teams.

=== Major League Rugby (MLR) ===
Major League Rugby is the highest level of professional rugby union in the United States and Canada. The competition is supported and sanctioned by USA Rugby. The first season of Major League Rugby began in May 2018 with seven teams ranging from the Pacific Northwest to the Southwest. The top four teams make the playoffs for a spot in the final, the winner receives the American Championship Shield. Thirteen teams competed in the 2022 season but will be reduced to twelve in the 2023 season, with Chicago replacing Los Angeles and Austin.

=== National Lacrosse League (NLL) ===
The National Lacrosse League (NLL) is a men's professional box lacrosse league in North America. It currently has 12 teams: 7 in the United States and 5 in Canada. The NLL plays its games in the winter and spring. The league's American teams have historically been concentrated in the northeastern United States, and two of the league's longest-established and most commercially successful teams, the Buffalo Bandits and Rochester Knighthawks, still reside there. Each year, the playoff teams battle for the National Lacrosse League Cup. The NLL averaged between 9,400 and 10,700 spectators per game each year from 2004 to 2012.

=== National Women's Soccer League (NWSL) ===
The National Women's Soccer League (NWSL) is a professional women's soccer league. At the top of the United States league system, it is the country's primary competition for women's soccer. The NWSL was established in 2012 as a successor to Women's Professional Soccer (2007–2012). The league began play in 2013 with eight teams; four of which were former members of Women's Professional Soccer. With the addition of two expansion teams in Houston and Orlando since the league's founding, it reached a peak of 10 teams based throughout the United States. Following the 2017 season, the league dropped to 9 teams following the demise of two charter members, one of which was replaced by a new franchise. The league returned to 10 teams for 2021. Utah Royals FC, which had inherited the roster of the defunct FC Kansas City after the 2017 season, itself folded after the 2020 season, with its roster being taken over by a new Kansas City ownership group that now fields the Kansas City Current. The completely new Racing Louisville FC also started play in 2021. The NWSL added two teams in 2022, the Los Angeles-based Angel City FC and San Diego Wave FC. In 2024, the Utah Royals returned to the league under new ownership, and the San Francisco Bay Area-based Bay FC also joined. The Boston-based Boston Legacy FC and Denver-based Denver NWSL team plan to join in 2026.

=== Premier Lacrosse League (PLL) ===
The Premier Lacrosse League is a professional field lacrosse league. The league originally uses a competitive model that radically differs from those of other U.S. professional leagues—its eight teams play a tour-based schedule. Each week, the league visits a different market, with all teams playing. It absorbed the older Major League Lacrosse in a merger in 2020. In 2023, all 8 PLL teams were assigned to cities. Starting in 2024, the teams were aligned into Eastern and Western conferences, and the regular-season schedule was expanded to 10 games. Each team plays two games against the other teams in its conference and single games against teams in the opposite conference.

=== Professional Women's Hockey League (PWHL) ===
The Professional Women's Hockey League (PWHL) started play in January 2024 as the de facto replacement of the Premier Hockey Federation (PHF). The PHF had played since 2015, originally as the National Women's Hockey League, and was the first professional women's hockey league in North America. After the PHF's 2022–23 season, the league was purchased by a group led by investor Mark Walter and tennis great Billie Jean King, and was shut down to make way for the PWHL. The PWHL will field six teams, three each in the U.S. and Canada, in its first season. This was down from the seven teams (five U.S., two Canadian) that the PHF fielded in its final season.

Women's hockey leagues before the PHF, such as the high-level Canadian Women's Hockey League (CWHL), were non-paid and teams operated with primarily local players. Many teams, such as the Minnesota Whitecaps, operated independently to give women a place to keep playing after their college careers. The NWHL had four teams in its inaugural season that competed for the Isobel Cup. It later added the Whitecaps for the 2018–19 season, the Toronto Six for 2020–21, and the Montreal Force for 2022–23, and adopted the Premier Hockey Federation name starting in 2021–22.

The CWHL was primarily based out of Canada from 2007 to 2019, but also had a team in the United States and up to two teams in China. The CWHL teams competed for the Clarkson Cup, a trophy that was previously awarded to the best women's hockey team regardless of league before it became the de facto CHWL championship in 2011. The CWHL began paying its players a stipend in 2017 to compete with the NWHL, based largely off its expansion into China. The CWHL ceased operations in 2019 citing that the two leagues could not coexist, splitting the potential sponsorship revenue, and still be financially feasible.

Following the demise of the CWHL, players from both leagues were dissatisfied in the operation of both the NWHL and CWHL in that neither league provided health insurance or a livable salary. Due to these conditions, over 200 players released a joint statement announcing their intent to not participate in any North American professional league for the 2019–20 season. The players formed a worker's union called the Professional Women's Hockey Player Association (PWHPA) to further push for their stated goals of a league that provides financial and infrastructure resources to players, health insurance, and support to training programs for young female players. Members of the PWHPA hold tournaments in various locations in support of their cause for a creating a fully professional women's league. This initiative bore fruit in 2023 with the creation of the PWHL.

=== USL Super League (USLS) ===
Announced in 2021 but not starting play until August 2024, the USL Super League is operated by the United Soccer League, which operates a series of lower-level soccer leagues for men, women, and youth. USLS initially planned to start play in 2023, but delayed its first season by a year, partially because it decided to seek sanctioning by the U.S. Soccer Federation as a Division I league—the same level as the NWSL—instead of Division II. USLS received said sanctioning before its first season. Unlike most U.S. soccer leagues, USLS plays a fall-to-spring season, putting it in line with most European leagues and the sport's international calendar.

=== Women's National Basketball Association (WNBA) ===
The Women's National Basketball Association (WNBA) is the highest level of competition in women's basketball. Currently the WNBA is one of two fully professional women's sports leagues operating in North America. Founded in 1996 and beginning play in the 1997 season, it is the longest-running active American professional women's sport league in history.

The league's attendance started with about 10,000 per game in the 1990s, steadied in the 7,000 to 8,000 range in most of the 2010s, before dropping under 7,000 since 2018. As WNBA attendance has fallen, both the Atlanta Dream and Washington Mystics have moved from arenas seating over 18,000 to ones with less than 5,000; the New York Liberty made a similar move, but had planned to return to an NBA arena in 2020 after being purchased by an NBA team owner (said return was delayed to 2021 due to COVID-19). Total attendance was 1,598,160 in 2010. In 2007, the league signed a television deal with ESPN that ran from 2009 to 2016. This deal is the first to ever pay rights fees to women's teams. In 2009, it had a total television viewership of 413,000 in combined cable and broadcast television.

In 2024, the WNBA saw major increases in attendance and media interest, much of this credited to the arrival of college basketball icon Caitlin Clark in the league.

== Minor leagues ==
Several of the major sports leagues in the United States have other professional leagues in tiers below them. For example, Major League Baseball has an extensive "farm system" of minor league teams. Similarly, below Major League Soccer (as of 2025) are the Division II USL Championship and two Division III leagues—USL League One and MLS Next Pro. The National Independent Soccer Association had been another third-level league before disputes with the United States Soccer Federation led to it only playing a cup tournament in 2025; it plans to resume full-season play in 2026.

=== American football ===
In contrast with the other major sports, the National Football League does not maintain an official minor league system. The only league to have served as a minor league to the entire NFL was NFL Europe; teams in NFL Europe were not affiliated with an individual NFL squad, but instead received prospects from all of the NFL's teams, who played in Europe during the offseason, then returned stateside in time for training camp. Individual NFL teams over the course of their history signed affiliation deals with the American Association in the 1930s, the Association of Professional Football Leagues in the 1940s, and the Atlantic Coast Football League in the 1960s. In addition to these leagues, NFL owners also operated franchises in the Arena Football League in the 2000s (decade); this arrangement differed in that the AFL teams were not directly used for player development. Arena football had its own minor league, arenafootball2, for most of the same decade.

The most recent independent minor professional football leagues to play outdoors were the Alliance of American Football, which both began play and folded in 2019, failing to complete its only season, and the XFL, which shared the name and some ownership with a previous XFL that played one season in 2001, and began play in 2020, one week after the Super Bowl. It declared bankruptcy and shut down after the COVID-19 pandemic forced the league to prematurely end its inaugural season. Afterwards, the rights to the league were bought by Dwayne Johnson and his business partner and former wife Dany Garcia, with Johnson first announcing that the league planned to resume play in 2022 and then delaying that to 2023. The XFL later announced a formal partnership with the NFL, with the XFL to be used as a test bed for potential NFL rules changes, as well as a developing ground for coaches and game officials.

A new version of the United States Football League started play in 2022, also as a spring league. Partially owned by Fox Sports, it played its first regular season entirely in Birmingham, Alabama, shifting to Canton, Ohio for its playoffs due to scheduling conflicts with Birmingham's hosting of the 2022 World Games. For 2023, four cities hosted regular-season games, each hosting two teams.

The USFL and XFL merged after their 2023 seasons to form the current United Football League. The merged league features teams from four former XFL markets, three former USFL markets, and one market that had teams in both leagues.

The Spring League, founded in 2017, is nominally professional but does not pay its players and in fact charges many of its players to participate, a business model that allows it to play without spectators or television revenue.

Indoor American football leagues outside the auspices of the Arena Football League have historically played at a level somewhere on the margins between minor-professional and semi-professional. Some surviving indoor leagues include the American Arena League, Champions Indoor Football, Indoor Football League, and National Arena League. Indoor leagues are notorious for their instability, with teams often folding midway through their seasons, teams jumping between leagues, and leagues often failing to launch or folding abruptly. Fan Controlled Football follows a gaming-inspired, made-for-television approach to the sport, with fans voting on rules, recognizable former NFL players, and power-ups that allow special one-time rule changes.

=== American Hockey League (AHL) ===
The American Hockey League (AHL) is a 32-team professional ice hockey league based in the United States and Canada that serves as the primary developmental league for the National Hockey League (NHL). Since the 2010–11 season, every team in the league has an affiliation agreement with an NHL team. Twenty-six AHL teams are located in the United States and the remaining six are in Canada. The annual playoff champion is awarded the Calder Cup, named for Frank Calder, the first president (1917–1943) of the NHL. The league's players are represented by the Professional Hockey Players' Association (PHPA).

The ECHL is a mid-level professional ice hockey league with teams across the United States and two franchises in Canada. It is a tier below the AHL. Like the AHL, the league's players are represented by the PHPA. All but four NHL teams have affiliations with an ECHL team with Vancouver, St. Louis, Nashville, and Winnipeg having no official affiliations as of 2022. However, these teams do sometimes lend contracted players to ECHL teams for development and increased playing time. The league's regular season begins in October and ends in April.

The AHL and the ECHL are the only minor leagues recognized by the collective bargaining agreement between the NHL and the National Hockey League Players' Association, meaning any player signed to an entry-level NHL contract and designated for assignment must report to a club in either the ECHL or the AHL.

Additionally, lower-level professional leagues include the SPHL (formerly Southern Professional Hockey League), Federal Prospects Hockey League (FPHL), and Ligue Nord-Américaine de Hockey (LNAH). These leagues operate largely independently, though some SPHL teams are used as affiliates by ECHL teams.

=== Minor League Baseball (MiLB) ===
Minor League Baseball is a hierarchy of professional baseball leagues in the United States and Canada are developmental league that compete at levels below Major League Baseball (MLB) and provide opportunities for player development and a way to prepare for the major leagues. All of the minor leagues are operated as independent businesses. Most are members of the umbrella organization known as Minor League Baseball (MiLB), which operates under the Commissioner of Baseball within the scope of organized baseball, a five-tier league hierarchy (six when Major League Baseball is included as the top tier) that classifies leagues by level of development. The highest level of minor league baseball, Triple-A, features high level major league prospects almost ready to join the majors playing in large cities without MLB franchises, while each successively lower class (Double-A, High-A, Low-A, and Rookie) features players with correspondingly less experience and, generally, playing in smaller markets. Additionally, several independent baseball leagues, none of which had any official links to Major League Baseball before 2021 (with only four now having such links), also operate, with varying quality of competition, some in suburban communities too close to affiliated baseball teams to avoid territorial exclusivity.

=== Minor League Cricket (MiLC) ===
Minor League Cricket is a developmental Twenty20 cricket league for Major League Cricket that had its inaugural season begin in 2021, after it was delayed from a mid-to-late 2020 start due to the COVID-19 pandemic. It consists of 26 teams from four regions. The league began its regional draft process in late-August 2020, and a series of exhibition games in September 2020. The draft for the league began on June 4, 2021. The Strikers won the inaugural finals against the New Jersey Stallions by six wickets, with the Thunderbolts winning the 2022 finals against the Atlanta Fire by ten runs.

=== NBA G League ===
The NBA G League, formerly the NBA Development League (D-League), is the National Basketball Association's official minor league basketball organization. The D-League started with eight teams in the fall of 2001. In March 2005, NBA commissioner David Stern announced a plan to expand the D-League to 15 teams and develop it into a true minor league farm system, with each D-League team affiliated with one or more NBA teams. At the conclusion of the 2013–14 NBA season, 33% of NBA players had spent time in the D-League, up from 23% in 2011. The last completed season of 2018–19 featured 27 teams; the 2019–20 season, which was started but not completed due to COVID-19, featured 28. With COVID-19 still impacting the league in 2020–21, 11 of the intended 29 teams chose to sit out that season. The league initially planned to add a Mexican team, the Mexico City Capitanes, in 2020–21, but that team's G League debut was delayed to 2021–22. All G League teams except the Capitanes are either owned by an NBA franchise or affiliated with a single NBA team; the last "independent" team, the Fort Wayne Mad Ants (now the Noblesville Boom), was acquired by the Indiana Pacers in September 2015. The G League formerly featured a developmental team, NBA G League Ignite, that played exhibitions against G League franchises during the season through the 2022–23 season, after which it was fully incorporated into the league. The NBA created this team as an alternative to college basketball for elite high school prospects. However, legal challenges to the NCAA's nominally amateur model in the 2020s led to the legalization of direct payments to college athletes, making the concept of Ignite mostly irrelevant. The NBA shuttered Ignite after the 2023–24 G League season.

=== USL Championship (USL) ===
The USL Championship is a professional men's soccer league in the United States and Canada that began its inaugural season in 2011. The USL Championship is sanctioned as a Division II Professional League by the United States Soccer Federation (U.S. Soccer). The league is owned and operated by United Soccer League (USL; formerly United Soccer Leagues) and was formed as result of the organization's merger of the old USL First and Second Divisions. The merger is meant to consolidate USL's position within the American professional soccer landscape and focus on stability, commercial growth and the professional development of soccer in four main regions throughout the United States and Canada. In January 2013, USL and MLS reached an agreement to integrate USL Pro league competition with the MLS Reserve League, primarily to improve player development in North America, strengthen league competition and build ties between divisions in the American soccer pyramid. This multi-year deal encourages MLS and USL Pro team affiliations and player loans, and it will lead to more games for teams and developing players.

The USL Championship (USLC), rebranded from "United Soccer League" after the 2018 season, fields 24 teams in its ongoing 2025 season, with many expansion teams coming in the coming years. The league peaked at 36 teams in 2019, but since that season, three teams folded entirely, with one doing so because of the 2023 arrival of a new MLS team in its city; two others were withdrawn from the USL system by their MLS parent clubs (those sides would eventually be revived in MLS Next Pro); three other MLS reserve sides moved directly from the USLC to Next Pro; another was replaced in 2020 by a new MLS team in the same city; and two voluntarily dropped to the third-level USL League One. One of the teams that folded in 2019 sold its USLC franchise rights to a preexisting club in Miami, which thus joined the USLC. Two California-based teams joined in the 2020s, with San Diego doing so in 2020 and Oakland in 2021. More teams are set to start play in the coming years, but several MLS affiliates left after the 2022 season for MLS Next Pro.

Major League Soccer pulled most of its lower-level affiliates from the USL system in the early 2020s in preparation for MLS Next Pro, a third-level league that launched in 2022. Of the 21 teams in the inaugural season, 20 are MLS reserve sides. By the 2023 season, all US-based MLS teams except D.C. United fielded their reserve sides in Next Pro, with the final reserve team, Loudoun United FC, being sold and becoming its own separate club by the 2024 season.

The USL corporation launched a new third-division league, known as USL League One (USL1), for the 2019 season. That league began play with 10 teams and expanded to 11 in 2020, a number it has maintained in both subsequent seasons, although the lineup of USL1 teams has changed after each of its seasons to date. The league is currently set to expand to 21 teams in 2026.

A new third division league, the National Independent Soccer Association (NISA), was founded in 2019 and was founded as semi-professional; however, they obtained professional status.

== See also ==
- Amateur sports
- List of professional sports teams in the United States and Canada
- Major professional sports leagues in the United States and Canada
- Major professional sports teams in the United States and Canada
- List of American and Canadian cities by number of major professional sports teams
- Prominent women's sports leagues in the United States and Canada
- List of top level minor league sports teams in the United States by city
- List of soccer clubs in the United States by city
