= Major professional sports teams in the United States and Canada =

This article is a list of teams that play in the major professional sports leagues in the United States and Canada: Major League Baseball (MLB), the National Basketball Association (NBA), the National Football League (NFL), the National Hockey League (NHL), Major League Soccer (MLS), and the Canadian Football League (CFL).

Est. represents the year the team was originally established. Future expansion teams whose inaugural seasons are confirmed are also included.

Team	Venue	City	State/Province	League	Est.	Notes	Ref
Anaheim Ducks	Honda Center	Anaheim	California	NHL	1993	(Note: Previously the Mighty Ducks of Anaheim (1993–2006))	
Arizona Cardinals	State Farm Stadium	Glendale	Arizona	NFL	1898	(Note: Established in Chicago as the Morgan Athletic Club, and joined the NFL as a charter member on September 17, 1920. Previously the Chicago Cardinals (1920–1959) and St. Louis Cardinals (1960–1987))	
Arizona Diamondbacks	Chase Field	Phoenix	Arizona	MLB	1998		
Athletics	Sutter Health Park	West Sacramento	California	MLB	1901	(Note: Previously the Philadelphia Athletics (1901–1954), Kansas City Athletics (1955–1967), and Oakland Athletics (1968–2024))	
Atlanta Braves	Truist Park	Cumberland	Georgia	MLB	1871	(Note: Previously the Boston Braves (1871–1952) and Milwaukee Braves (1953–1965))	
Atlanta Falcons	Mercedes-Benz Stadium	Atlanta	Georgia	NFL	1966		
Atlanta Hawks	State Farm Arena	Atlanta	Georgia	NBA	1949	(Note: Previously the Tri-Cities Blackhawks (1949–1951), Milwaukee Hawks (1951–1955) and St. Louis Hawks (1955–1968))	
Atlanta United FC	Mercedes-Benz Stadium	Atlanta	Georgia	MLS	2017		
Austin FC	Q2 Stadium	Austin	Texas	MLS	2021		
Baltimore Orioles	Oriole Park at Camden Yards	Baltimore	Maryland	MLB	1894	(Note: Previously the Milwaukee Brewers (1894–1901) and St. Louis Browns (1902–1953))	
Baltimore Ravens	M&T Bank Stadium	Baltimore	Maryland	NFL	1996	(Note: The Baltimore Ravens were created from the corporate structure of the previous season's Cleveland Browns. The NFL considers the Ravens to have been an expansion franchise. See also Cleveland Browns relocation controversy.)	
BC Lions	BC Place	Vancouver	British Columbia	CFL	1954		
Boston Bruins	TD Garden	Boston	Massachusetts	NHL	1924		
Boston Celtics	TD Garden	Boston	Massachusetts	NBA	1946		
Boston Red Sox	Fenway Park	Boston	Massachusetts	MLB	1901		
Brooklyn Nets	Barclays Center	New York City	New York	NBA	1967	(Note: Previously the New Jersey Americans (1967–1968), New York Nets (1968–1977) and New Jersey Nets (1977–2012))	
Buffalo Bills	Highmark Stadium	Orchard Park	New York	NFL	1960		
Buffalo Sabres	KeyBank Center	Buffalo	New York	NHL	1970		
Calgary Flames	Scotiabank Saddledome	Calgary	Alberta	NHL	1972	(Note: Previously the Atlanta Flames (1972–1980))	
Calgary Stampeders	McMahon Stadium	Calgary	Alberta	CFL	1945		
Carolina Hurricanes	Lenovo Center	Raleigh	North Carolina	NHL	1972 (Note: The Hurricanes did not play in Raleigh until 1999, when the venue now known as Lenovo Center opened. The team, as planned, played its first two North Carolina seasons in Greensboro.)	(Note: Previously the Hartford Whalers (1972–1997))	
Carolina Panthers	Bank of America Stadium	Charlotte	North Carolina	NFL	1995 (Note: The Panthers played their inaugural 1995 season on the campus of Clemson University in South Carolina while the venue now known as Bank of America Stadium was being completed in Charlotte.)		
Charlotte FC	Bank of America Stadium	Charlotte	North Carolina	MLS	2022		
Charlotte Hornets	Spectrum Center	Charlotte	North Carolina	NBA	1988	(Note: As part of a collaboration between this franchise, the New Orleans Pelicans and the NBA, the history of the original Charlotte Hornets (1988–2002) and the history of the Charlotte Bobcats are considered part of the history of the current Hornets franchise.)	
Chicago Bears	Soldier Field	Chicago	Illinois	NFL	1920	(Note: Previously the Decatur Staleys (1920))	
Chicago Blackhawks	United Center	Chicago	Illinois	NHL	1926		
Chicago Bulls	United Center	Chicago	Illinois	NBA	1966		
Chicago Cubs	Wrigley Field	Chicago	Illinois	MLB	1870		
Chicago Fire FC	Soldier Field	Chicago	Illinois	MLS	1997		
Chicago White Sox	Rate Field	Chicago	Illinois	MLB	1894		
Cincinnati Bengals	Paycor Stadium	Cincinnati	Ohio	NFL	1968		
FC Cincinnati	TQL Stadium	Cincinnati	Ohio	MLS	2019		
Cincinnati Reds	Great American Ball Park	Cincinnati	Ohio	MLB	1882		
Cleveland Browns	Huntington Bank Field	Cleveland	Ohio	NFL	1946	(Note: In 1996, the Browns corporate structure was transferred to Baltimore, Maryland, to become the Baltimore Ravens. The NFL considers the Browns to have been inactive from 1996 until the re-establishment of football in Cleveland in the 1999 NFL season. See also Cleveland Browns relocation controversy.)	
Cleveland Cavaliers	Rocket Arena	Cleveland	Ohio	NBA	1970		
Cleveland Guardians	Progressive Field	Cleveland	Ohio	MLB	1894	(Note: Previously the Cleveland Indians (1915–2021). Club announced on December 14, 2020 that it would change the name "Indians" amidst the controversy surrounding it. The new team name "Guardians" was officially announced on July 23, 2021.)	
Colorado Avalanche	Ball Arena	Denver	Colorado	NHL	1972	(Note: Previously the Quebec Nordiques (1972–1995))	
Colorado Rapids	Dick's Sporting Goods Park	Commerce City	Colorado	MLS	1996		
Colorado Rockies	Coors Field	Denver	Colorado	MLB	1993		
Columbus Blue Jackets	Nationwide Arena	Columbus	Ohio	NHL	2000		
Columbus Crew SC	ScottsMiracle-Gro Field	Columbus	Ohio	MLS	1996		
Dallas Cowboys	AT&T Stadium	Arlington	Texas	NFL	1960		
FC Dallas	Toyota Stadium	Frisco	Texas	MLS	1996		
Dallas Mavericks	American Airlines Center	Dallas	Texas	NBA	1980		
Dallas Stars	American Airlines Center	Dallas	Texas	NHL	1967	(Note: Previously the Minnesota North Stars (1967–1993))	
D.C. United	Audi Field	Washington	District of Columbia	MLS	1996		
Denver Broncos	Empower Field at Mile High	Denver	Colorado	NFL	1960		
Denver Nuggets	Ball Arena	Denver	Colorado	NBA	1967		
Detroit Lions	Ford Field	Detroit	Michigan	NFL	1928	(Note: Previously the Portsmouth Spartans (1928–1933))	
Detroit Pistons	Little Caesars Arena	Detroit	Michigan	NBA	1948	(Note: Previously the Fort Wayne Pistons (1948–1957))	
Detroit Red Wings	Little Caesars Arena	Detroit	Michigan	NHL	1926		
Detroit Tigers	Comerica Park	Detroit	Michigan	MLB	1901		
Edmonton Elks	Commonwealth Stadium	Edmonton	Alberta	CFL	1949	(Note: Previously the Edmonton Eskimos (1949–2019). Club announced on July 21, 2020 it had retired its "Eskimos" name amid the controversy over it. In 2021, the club officially changed its name to the Elks.)	
Edmonton Oilers	Rogers Place	Edmonton	Alberta	NHL	1972		
Florida Panthers	Amerant Bank Arena	Sunrise	Florida	NHL	1993		
Golden State Warriors	Chase Center	San Francisco	California	NBA	1946	(Note: Previously the Philadelphia Warriors (1946–1962) and San Francisco Warriors (1962–1971))	
Green Bay Packers	Lambeau Field	Green Bay	Wisconsin	NFL	1919		
Hamilton Tiger-Cats	Hamilton Stadium	Hamilton	Ontario	CFL	1950	(Note: Formed by the merger of the Hamilton Tigers (1869) and Hamilton Wildcats (1941).)	
Houston Astros	Daikin Park	Houston	Texas	MLB	1962	(Note: Previously competed in the National League (1962–2012) and currently in the American League (2013–present).)	
Houston Dynamo FC	Shell Energy Stadium	Houston	Texas	MLS	2006	(Note: Formed from the roster of the San Jose Earthquakes, which went on hiatus.)	
Houston Rockets	Toyota Center	Houston	Texas	NBA	1967	(Note: Previously the San Diego Rockets (1967–1971))	
Houston Texans	NRG Stadium	Houston	Texas	NFL	2002		
Indiana Pacers	Gainbridge Fieldhouse	Indianapolis	Indiana	NBA	1967		
Indianapolis Colts	Lucas Oil Stadium	Indianapolis	Indiana	NFL	1953	(Note: Previously the Baltimore Colts (1953–1983). See also Baltimore Colts relocation to Indianapolis.)	
Jacksonville Jaguars	EverBank Stadium	Jacksonville	Florida	NFL	1995		
Kansas City Chiefs	Arrowhead Stadium	Kansas City	Missouri	NFL	1960	(Note: Previously the Dallas Texans (1960–1962))	
Kansas City Royals	Kauffman Stadium	Kansas City	Missouri	MLB	1969		
Sporting Kansas City	Sporting Park	Kansas City	Kansas	MLS	1996	(Note: Previously played in Kansas City, Missouri (1996–2008).)	
LA Galaxy	Dignity Health Sports Park	Carson	California	MLS	1996		
Las Vegas Raiders	Allegiant Stadium	Paradise	Nevada	NFL	1960	(Note: Previously the Oakland Raiders (1960–1982 and 1995–2019) and Los Angeles Raiders (1982–1994). See also Oakland Raiders relocation to Las Vegas.)	
Los Angeles Angels	Angel Stadium	Anaheim	California	MLB	1961	(Note: Previously the California Angels (1965– 1996), Anaheim Angels (1997–2004) and Los Angeles Angels of Anaheim (2005–2015))	
Los Angeles Chargers	SoFi Stadium	Inglewood	California	NFL	1960	(Note: Played inaugural 1960 season in Los Angeles before moving to San Diego, where they played as the San Diego Chargers (1961–2016))	
Los Angeles Clippers	Intuit Dome	Inglewood	California	NBA	1970	(Note: Previously the Buffalo Braves (1970–1978) and San Diego Clippers (1978–1984))	
Los Angeles Dodgers	Dodger Stadium	Los Angeles	California	MLB	1884	(Note: Previously the Brooklyn Dodgers (1884–1957))	
Los Angeles FC	BMO Stadium	Los Angeles	California	MLS	2018		
Los Angeles Kings	Crypto.com Arena	Los Angeles	California	NHL	1967		
Los Angeles Lakers	Crypto.com Arena	Los Angeles	California	NBA	1946	(Note: Previously the Detroit Gems (1946–1947) and Minneapolis Lakers (1947–1960))	
Los Angeles Rams	SoFi Stadium	Inglewood	California	NFL	1937	(Note: Previously the Cleveland Rams (1937–1945) and St. Louis Rams (1995–2015). Previously located in Los Angeles (1946–1994)).	
Memphis Grizzlies	FedExForum	Memphis	Tennessee	NBA	1995	(Note: Previously the Vancouver Grizzlies (1995–2001). See also Vancouver Grizzlies relocation to Memphis.)	
Miami Dolphins	Hard Rock Stadium	Miami Gardens	Florida	NFL	1966		
Miami Heat	Kaseya Center	Miami	Florida	NBA	1988		
Inter Miami CF	Chase Stadium	Fort Lauderdale	Florida	MLS	2020		
Miami Marlins	LoanDepot Park	Miami	Florida	MLB	1993	(Note: Previously the Florida Marlins (1993–2011))	
Milwaukee Brewers	American Family Field	Milwaukee	Wisconsin	MLB	1969	(Note: Previously the Seattle Pilots (1969). Competed in the American League (1970–1997) and currently in the National League (1998–present).)	
Milwaukee Bucks	Fiserv Forum	Milwaukee	Wisconsin	NBA	1968		
Minnesota Timberwolves	Target Center	Minneapolis	Minnesota	NBA	1989		
Minnesota Twins	Target Field	Minneapolis	Minnesota	MLB	1901	(Note: Previously the Washington Senators (1901–1960))	
Minnesota United FC	Allianz Field	St. Paul	Minnesota	MLS	2017		
Minnesota Vikings	U.S. Bank Stadium	Minneapolis	Minnesota	NFL	1961		
Minnesota Wild	Grand Casino Arena	St. Paul	Minnesota	NHL	2000		
Montreal Alouettes	Percival Molson Memorial Stadium	Montreal	Quebec	CFL	1946	(Note: The CFL considers all incarnations of the Alouettes as one franchise. Current incarnation is a result of a move by the Baltimore Stallions (1994–1995) ownership, but the Stallions are not considered part of the Alouettes franchise.)	
Montreal Canadiens	Bell Centre	Montreal	Quebec	NHL	1909		
CF Montréal	Saputo Stadium	Montreal	Quebec	MLS	2012	(Note: Previously the Montreal Impact (2012–2020))	
Nashville Predators	Bridgestone Arena	Nashville	Tennessee	NHL	1998		
Nashville SC	Geodis Park	Nashville	Tennessee	MLS	2020		
New England Patriots	Gillette Stadium	Foxborough	Massachusetts	NFL	1960	(Note: Previously the Boston Patriots (1960–1970))	
New England Revolution	Gillette Stadium	Foxborough	Massachusetts	MLS	1996		
New Jersey Devils	Prudential Center	Newark	New Jersey	NHL	1974	(Note: Previously the Kansas City Scouts (1974–1976) and Colorado Rockies (1976–1982))	
New Orleans Pelicans	Smoothie King Center	New Orleans	Louisiana	NBA	2002	(Note: Temporarily relocated to Oklahoma City (2005–2007))	
New Orleans Saints	Caesars Superdome	New Orleans	Louisiana	NFL	1967		
New York City FC	Yankee Stadium	New York City	New York	MLS	2015		
New York Giants	MetLife Stadium	East Rutherford	New Jersey	NFL	1925		
New York Islanders	UBS Arena	Elmont	New York	NHL	1972		
New York Jets	MetLife Stadium	East Rutherford	New Jersey	NFL	1960	(Note: Previously the Titans of New York (1960–1962))	
New York Knicks	Madison Square Garden	New York City	New York	NBA	1946		
New York Mets	Citi Field	New York City	New York	MLB	1962		
New York Rangers	Madison Square Garden	New York City	New York	NHL	1926		
New York Red Bulls	Sports Illustrated Stadium	Harrison	New Jersey	MLS	1996		
New York Yankees	Yankee Stadium	New York City	New York	MLB	1903		
Oklahoma City Thunder	Paycom Center	Oklahoma City	Oklahoma	NBA	1967	(Note: Previously the Seattle SuperSonics (1967–2008). See also Seattle SuperSonics relocation to Oklahoma City.)	
Orlando City SC	Inter&Co Stadium	Orlando	Florida	MLS	2015		
Orlando Magic	Kia Center	Orlando	Florida	NBA	1989		
Ottawa Redblacks	TD Place Stadium	Ottawa	Ontario	CFL	1876; 2002; 2014	(Note: Since 2017, the CFL has treated all Ottawa-based teams in the CFL and its predecessor leagues as a single entity for record-keeping purposes. The previous teams were the Ottawa Rough Riders (1876–1996) and Ottawa Renegades (2002–2005).)	
Ottawa Senators	Canadian Tire Centre	Ottawa	Ontario	NHL	1992		
Philadelphia 76ers	Xfinity Mobile Arena	Philadelphia	Pennsylvania	NBA	1949	(Note: Previously the Syracuse Nationals (1949–1963))	
Philadelphia Eagles	Lincoln Financial Field	Philadelphia	Pennsylvania	NFL	1933		
Philadelphia Flyers	Xfinity Mobile Arena	Philadelphia	Pennsylvania	NHL	1967		
Philadelphia Phillies	Citizens Bank Park	Philadelphia	Pennsylvania	MLB	1883		
Philadelphia Union	Subaru Park	Chester	Pennsylvania	MLS	2010		
Phoenix Suns	Mortgage Matchup Center	Phoenix	Arizona	NBA	1968		
Pittsburgh Penguins	PPG Paints Arena	Pittsburgh	Pennsylvania	NHL	1967		
Pittsburgh Pirates	PNC Park	Pittsburgh	Pennsylvania	MLB	1882		
Pittsburgh Steelers	Acrisure Stadium	Pittsburgh	Pennsylvania	NFL	1933		
Portland Timbers	Providence Park	Portland	Oregon	MLS	2011		
Portland Trail Blazers	Moda Center	Portland	Oregon	NBA	1970		
Sacramento Kings	Golden 1 Center	Sacramento	California	NBA	1948	(Note: Previously the Rochester Royals (1948–1957), Cincinnati Royals (1957–1972) and Kansas City Kings (1972–1985))	
St. Louis Blues	Enterprise Center	St. Louis	Missouri	NHL	1967		
St. Louis Cardinals	Busch Stadium	St. Louis	Missouri	MLB	1882		
St. Louis City SC	Energizer Park	St. Louis	Missouri	MLS	2023		
Real Salt Lake	America First Field	Sandy	Utah	MLS	2005		
San Antonio Spurs	Frost Bank Center	San Antonio	Texas	NBA	1967	(Note: Previously the Dallas Chaparrals (1967–1973))	
San Diego FC	Snapdragon Stadium	San Diego	California	MLS	2025		
San Diego Padres	Petco Park	San Diego	California	MLB	1969		
San Francisco 49ers	Levi's Stadium	Santa Clara	California	NFL	1946		
San Francisco Giants	Oracle Park	San Francisco	California	MLB	1883	(Note: Previously the New York Giants (1883–1957))	
San Jose Earthquakes	PayPal Park	San Jose	California	MLS	1996	(Note: The franchise was placed on hiatus in 2006, with the roster moving to Houston to become the Houston Dynamo, and reactivated in 2008.)	
San Jose Sharks	SAP Center at San Jose	San Jose	California	NHL	1991		
Saskatchewan Roughriders	Mosaic Stadium	Regina	Saskatchewan	CFL	1910		
Seattle Kraken	Climate Pledge Arena	Seattle	Washington	NHL	2021		
Seattle Mariners	T-Mobile Park	Seattle	Washington	MLB	1977		
Seattle Seahawks	Lumen Field	Seattle	Washington	NFL	1976		
Seattle Sounders FC	Lumen Field	Seattle	Washington	MLS	2009		
Tampa Bay Buccaneers	Raymond James Stadium	Tampa	Florida	NFL	1976		
Tampa Bay Lightning	Benchmark International Arena	Tampa	Florida	NHL	1992		
Tampa Bay Rays	Tropicana Field	St. Petersburg	Florida	MLB	1998		
Tennessee Titans	Nissan Stadium	Nashville	Tennessee	NFL	1960 (Note: The team did not play in Nashville until 1998. When relocating the franchise from Houston to Nashville, owner Bud Adams originally planned for the team to play both the 1997 and 1998 seasons in Memphis as the Tennessee Oilers during the construction of what is now known as Nissan Stadium. Low attendance led Adams to move the team to Nashville a year earlier than planned, playing in Vanderbilt Stadium until the new venue was completed for the 1999 season.)	(Note: Previously the Houston Oilers (1960–1996))	
Texas Rangers	Globe Life Field	Arlington	Texas	MLB	1961	(Note: Previously the Washington Senators (1961–1971))	
Toronto Argonauts	BMO Field	Toronto	Ontario	CFL	1873		
Toronto Blue Jays	Rogers Centre	Toronto	Ontario	MLB	1977		
Toronto FC	BMO Field	Toronto	Ontario	MLS	2007		
Toronto Maple Leafs	Scotiabank Arena	Toronto	Ontario	NHL	1923		
Toronto Raptors	Scotiabank Arena	Toronto	Ontario	NBA	1995		
Utah Jazz	Delta Center	Salt Lake City	Utah	NBA	1974	(Note: Previously the New Orleans Jazz (1974–1979).)	
Utah Mammoth	Delta Center	Salt Lake City	Utah	NHL	2024	(Note: Team is officially considered by the NHL to be an expansion team, but acquired the entire hockey assets of the Arizona Coyotes. Played as the Utah Hockey Club during the 2024–25 NHL season.)	
Vancouver Canucks	Rogers Arena	Vancouver	British Columbia	NHL	1970		
Vancouver Whitecaps FC	BC Place	Vancouver	British Columbia	MLS	2011		
Vegas Golden Knights	T-Mobile Arena	Paradise	Nevada	NHL	2017		
Washington Capitals	Capital One Arena	Washington	District of Columbia	NHL	1974		
Washington Commanders	Northwest Stadium	Landover	Maryland	NFL	1932	(Note: Previously the Boston Braves (1932–1933), Boston Redskins (1933–1936), Washington Redskins (1937–2019), and Washington Football Team (2020–2021). The team retired its "Redskins" name and logo in July 2020 amidst corporate financial pressure resulting from the controversy over it. They were rebranded as the Commanders in 2022.)	
Washington Nationals	Nationals Park	Washington	District of Columbia	MLB	1969	(Note: Previously the Montreal Expos (1969–2004). During the franchise's last two seasons as the Expos, it split its home schedule between Montreal and San Juan, Puerto Rico.)	
Washington Wizards	Capital One Arena	Washington	District of Columbia	NBA	1961	(Note: Previously the Chicago Packers (1961–1962), Chicago Zephyrs (1962–1963), Baltimore Bullets (1963–1973), Capital Bullets (1973–1974) and Washington Bullets (1974–1997))	
Winnipeg Blue Bombers	Princess Auto Stadium	Winnipeg	Manitoba	CFL	1930		
Winnipeg Jets	Canada Life Centre	Winnipeg	Manitoba	NHL	1999	(Note: Previously the Atlanta Thrashers (1999–2011))	

Established

== See also ==
- Major professional sports leagues in the United States and Canada
- Professional sports leagues in the United States
- List of professional sports leagues
- List of defunct professional sports leagues
- List of American and Canadian cities by number of major professional sports teams
- List of professional sports teams in the United States and Canada
- List of top-level minor league sports teams in the United States by metropolitan area
- List of soccer clubs in the United States
