= Two-way contract =

Type of professional sports contract

A two-way contract is a professional sports contract that stipulates that an athlete's salary is dependent upon the league in which the athlete is assigned to play. This is opposed to a one-way contract that would pay the same salary regardless of where the athlete is assigned to play.

== Basketball ==
Beginning in the 2017–18 season, the National Basketball Association added two-way contracts between NBA teams and their minor league NBA G League affiliates. Through the 2022–23 season, each team could offer two contracts per season to players with fewer than four years of NBA experience; from 2023 to 2024, three such contracts per team are allowed. Unlike in the NHL, these contracts are not offered to every aspiring NBA player, but are intended for players whom a team would like to keep "on retainer" without having to sign to a full-time contract. However, some players drafted during the second-round of an NBA draft can be retained by teams under a two-way contract as an alternative signing method for them. Two-way players are typically considered to be the "16th and 17th men" (and presumably "18th") on a roster.

The two-way contract system benefits young undrafted players who do not want to play professional basketball overseas and want to play in the NBA, as well as those who believe an organizational investment in them is beneficial toward their development. Some player agents have been concerned about this system, because in exchange for guaranteed employment at a higher salary than a typical G League player, two-way players give up the freedom to be called up from the G League by any NBA team, possibly one with intent to sign the player to a 10-day contract, which could eventually lead to a full-time NBA roster spot sooner than with a two-way contract. However, some players who have proven themselves during their time under a two-way contract can then be given a full-scale contract for the rest of the season, though they can require removing another player from the team to maintain the maximum of 15 full roster spots.

=== Salary changes ===
Originally, excluding time spent before and after the G League's season, players on two-way contracts could spend up to 45 days per season with their NBA team, with these players being ineligible for the NBA Playoffs. During the 2017–18 season, players earned $75,000 while they were in the G League and roughly up to $204,000 if they spent the maximum 45 days on an NBA roster, increasing yearly up to $92,241 by the 2024–25 season.

However, as a result of the COVID-19 pandemic, during the subsequent suspension of the 2019–20 NBA season, the league allowed two-way players to become eligible for the 2020 NBA Playoffs within their 2020 NBA Bubble, as part of the effort to avoid any COVID-19 outbreaks spreading among the players.

For the 2020–21 season, which was shortened to 72 games and paired with a truncated 2020–21 NBA G League season, the NBA allowed a significant increase in salary for two-way contracts from an initial $81,955 minimum to an overall salary worth up to $449,155. The amount of time allowed with the NBA team also increased from 45 total days to 50 games. Even this restriction was eventually lifted, permitting two-way players to play the entire regular season and the 2021 NBA Playoffs. Players going over the initial 50-game cap receive a veteran's minimum salary. However, it was ultimately revealed to only be for that playoff stretch, as two-way contracts would return to the 50 game barrier the following season, with no playoff appearances whatsoever for them in the process, barring any last-minute promotions to the regular season roster for them.

== Baseball ==
In baseball, players can receive a split contract. This contract pays the player different salaries based on whether they are in Major League Baseball or Minor League Baseball.

== Ice hockey ==
Two-way contracts are common for professional ice hockey players who aspire to play in the National Hockey League (NHL). Any player entering the NHL for the first time will sign an entry-level, two-way contract with an NHL team stipulating that he will receive a higher salary if assigned to play with the NHL team, but will receive a lower salary if assigned to play for a team in the minor leagues such as the American Hockey League (AHL) or the ECHL.
