= USL Super League =

Professional women's soccer league in the United States

- Generic logo (top) and sponsor logo (bottom)
- Organizing body: United Soccer League
- First season: 2024–25
- Country: United States
- Confederation: CONCACAF
- Number of clubs: 8 (10 in 2027, 11 in 2028)
- Level on pyramid: 1
- Current champion(s): Lexington SC (2025–26)
- Current Players' Shield: Lexington SC (2025–26)
- Broadcaster: Peacock
- Website: gainbridgesuperleague.com
- Current: 2026 Fall season

The USL Super League (USLS), officially known as the Gainbridge Super League for sponsorship reasons, is a professional women's soccer league and the highest level of the United States soccer league system, alongside the National Women's Soccer League. Organized by the United Soccer League (USL), it operates as its premier league for women above the pre-professional USL W League. It began play with the 2024–25 season.

The league consists of eight clubs who annually play four round-robins – two in the fall and two in the spring – to earn four places in a playoff tournament that determines the league's champion. Additional clubs are expected to join the league in the future. Clubs in the league have no cap on salaries or squad sizes, while minimum salaries are around US$35,000 to 37,000. There is no draft system, and squads are primarily built with free agents. The league's matches are streamed nationally on Peacock.

The USLS was established in September 2021 as part of an effort to develop a youth-to-pro pathway for women's players within the USL system. Initially planned as a division two league, numerous USL clubs explored fielding women's teams in the league, with eight markets being decided upon. The USL would later successfully seek division one sanctioning by U.S. Soccer, marking the first time that two leagues occupied the top tier of the United States women's soccer league system. As of the 2025–26 season, Lexington SC are the current champions and Players' Shield holders.

== History ==
Embarking on the creation of a full pathway for women's soccer within their system, the United Soccer League (USL) established a professional women's league in 2021, and publicly unveiled it as the USL Super League in September of that year. Amanda Vandervort, former Chief Women's Football Officer for FIFPro, was appointed as the league's first president. In the wake of the unveiling, D.C. United, Lane United FC, Memphis 901 FC, Real Central New Jersey, USL New Orleans, and Santa Barbara Sky FC expressed interest in entering the Super League.

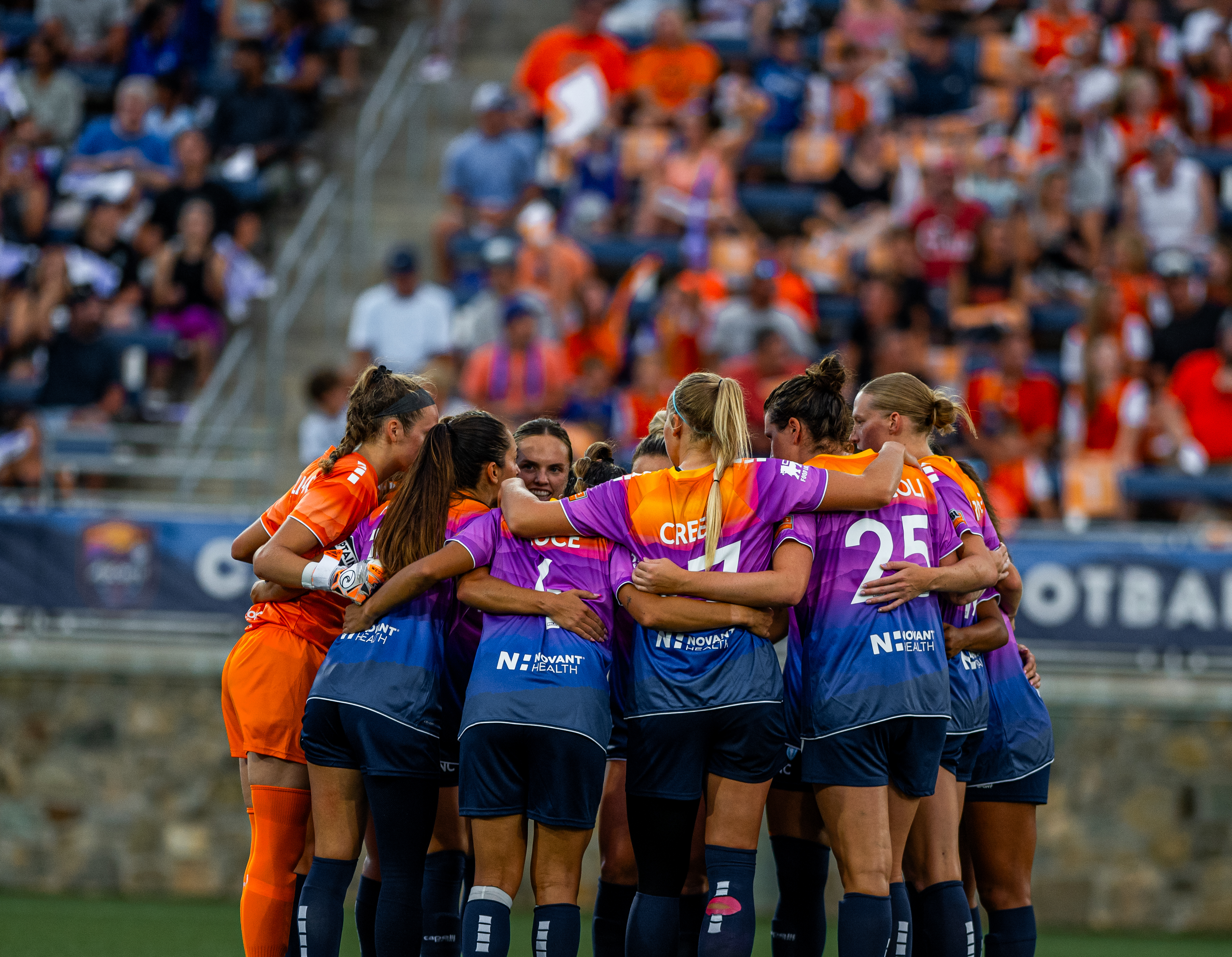
The first match in USL Super League history was hosted at American Legion Memorial Stadium in Charlotte. (Carolina Ascent FC players before the match pictured)

In May 2023, the USL awarded Super League franchise rights to Carolina Ascent FC, Dallas Trinity FC, DC Power FC, FC Tucson, Lexington SC, Phoenix Rising FC, Spokane Zephyr FC, and Tampa Bay Sun FC for the inaugural season; and Chattanooga Red Wolves SC, Forward Madison, Indy Eleven, Oakland Soul SC, and Sporting Club Jacksonville for later seasons. FC Tucson and the Rising would later forfeit their franchise rights, citing unpreparedness for professional play. Brooklyn FC and Fort Lauderdale United gained entry into the league in their place. U.S. Soccer granted the Super League its Division I sanctioning in February 2024, alongside the National Women's Soccer League. The league's inaugural season kicked off on August 17, 2024, with two matches: an Ascent home victory against DC Power FC during which Vicky Bruce scored the league's first goal, and a Zephyr home tie with Fort Lauderdale.

Spokane Zephyr FC, an inaugural member team, abruptly folded at the end of the 2025–26 season amid a decline in attendance that averaged under 1,000 spectators. Beginning in 2026, the USLS will transition to a spring-to-fall season structure, matching the National Women's Soccer League. An abridged season will be played in the second half of 2026 followed by a full season in 2027.

== Format ==
The USL Super League is currently on a shortened fall season, with plans to run on a spring-fall calendar starting in the spring of 2027. They played their first 2 seasons under a "fall to summer" schedule, aligning with the traditional fall–spring domestic soccer season, which differed from the spring–fall schedule typically used by American soccer leagues. A mid-season break was observed in order to avoid play in harsher climates during winter. The Super League does not have a college draft, and clubs rely on free agents and transfers to build rosters.

The team with the best record in the regular season wins the USL Super League Players' Shield. After the regular season, the top four teams play a single-elimination playoff tournament, the winner of which is the league champion.

== Organization ==
Amanda Vandervort serves as the president of the USL Super League, while Missy Price serves as its vice president. Carrie Taylor is its vice president of operations. The league is organized underneath the United Soccer League league system, which is led by Alec and Nick Papadakis, who has led the USL since his appointment in 2009.

== Teams ==
2026 USL Super League teams
Team	Location	Venue	Cap	First	Men's Affilate
Brooklyn FC	New York City, NY	Maimonides Park	7,000	2024–25	Brooklyn FC (USLC)
Carolina Ascent FC	Charlotte, NC	American Legion Memorial Stadium	10,500	2024–25	Charlotte Independence (USL1)
Dallas Trinity FC	Dallas, TX	Cotton Bowl	90,000	2024–25	Atlético Dallas (USLC)
DC Power FC	Washington, D.C.	Audi Field	20,000	2024–25	D.C. United (MLS)
Fort Lauderdale United FC	Fort Lauderdale, FL	Amerant Bank Field	≈5,000	2024–25	Fort Lauderdale United FC (USL2)
Lexington SC	Lexington, KY	Lexington SC Stadium	7,500	2024–25	Lexington SC (USLC)
Sporting Club Jacksonville	Jacksonville, FL	Hodges Stadium	12,000	2025–26	Sporting Club Jacksonville (USLC)
Tampa Bay Sun FC	Tampa, FL	Suncoast Credit Union Field	5,000	2024–25	—N/a

Future USL Super League teams
Team	Location	Venue	Cap	First
New York Cosmos	Paterson, NJ	Hinchliffe Stadium	10,000	2027–28
Ozark United FC	Rogers, AR	Ozark United Stadium	5,000	2027–28
Athletic Club Boise	Garden City, ID	Stadium at Expo Idaho	7,247	TBD
Buffalo Pro Soccer	Buffalo, NY	TBD	TBD	TBD
Chattanooga Red Wolves SC	East Ridge, TN	CHI Memorial Stadium	5,500	TBD
Indy Eleven	Indianapolis, IN	Eleven Park	20,000	TBD
Oakland Soul SC	Oakland, CA	Oakland Coliseum	15,000	TBD
Rally Madison FC	Madison, WI	Breese Stevens Field	5,000	TBD

Former USL Super League teams
Team	Location	Venue	Cap	First	Last
Spokane Zephyr FC	Spokane, WA	One Spokane Stadium	5,100	2024–25	2025–26

== Seasons ==
List of USL Super League seasons
Year	T	Pl	Champion	Runners-up	Players' Shield	Att.	Top scorer
2024–25	8	28	Tampa Bay Sun FC	Fort Lauderdale United FC	Carolina Ascent FC	2,487	(United States) Thornton (13)
2025–26	9	28	Lexington SC	Carolina Ascent FC	Lexington SC	2,634	(United States) Barry (16)
2026	8	14					

== Broadcasting and sponsorship ==
NBCUniversal holds broadcasting rights for the USL Super League as part of a multi-year deal. It livestreams all matches on its subscription streaming service Peacock, with some matches simulcast on its NBC Sports NOW FAST channel. Additionally, individual teams have sold packages of games to various local broadcasters, including over-the-air television stations and regional sports networks.

Gainbridge owns the league's naming rights as part of a multi-year deal beginning in the 2025–26 season.

== See also ==
- Prominent women's sports leagues in the United States and Canada
- Women's soccer in the United States
- USL W-League (1995–2015)
- Northern Super League
