= List of developmental and minor sports leagues =

This is a list of developmental and minor sports leagues, two concepts which are largely restricted to North American sports. Note that this does not include teams in leagues that include promotion and relegation.

== North America ==
=== Baseball ===
- Minor League Baseball
  - International League (Class AAA)
  - Pacific Coast League (Class AAA)
  - Eastern League (Class AA)
  - Southern League (Class AA)
  - Texas League (Class AA)
  - Midwest League (Class A+)
  - Northwest League (Class A+)
  - South Atlantic League (Class A+)
  - California League (Class A)
  - Carolina League (Class A)
  - Florida State League (Class A)
  - Arizona Complex League (rookie)
  - Florida Complex League (rookie)
  - Dominican Summer League (rookie)
- Off-season leagues
  - Arizona Fall League (off-season)
  - Colombian Professional Baseball League (off-season)
  - Dominican Winter Baseball League (off-season)
  - Mexican Pacific League (off-season)
  - Puerto Rico Baseball League (off-season)
  - Venezuelan Professional Baseball League (off-season)
- Independent baseball leagues
  - American Association †
  - Atlantic League †
  - Canadian League
  - Empire League
  - Frontier League †
  - Mexican League
  - Pecos League
  - Pioneer League †
  - United Shore League

† MLB Partner Leagues

=== Basketball ===
Affiliated:

- NBA G League
- NBA Summer League

Independent:

Pro

- 94x50 League (94x50)
- Basketball Super League (BSL)
- Big3
- Canadian Elite Basketball League (CEBL)
- Overtime Elite (OTE)
- The Basketball League (TBL)
- The Basketball Tournament (TBT)
- United States Basketball League (USBL)

Semi-Pro

- American Basketball Association (ABA)
- East Coast Basketball League (ECBL)
- Florida Basketball Association (FBA)
- Maximum Basketball League (MBL)
- Premier Basketball League (PBL)
- United Basketball League (UBL)
- Universal Basketball Association (UBA)

=== American football ===
Outdoor:

High-level

- United Football League

Low-level

- Gridiron Developmental Football League
- Liga de Fútbol Americano Profesional

Indoor:

High-level

- Fan Controlled Football
- Indoor Football League
- National Arena League
- Arena Football One

Mid-level

- American Indoor Football

Low-level

- American Arena League
- Great Lakes Arena Football

=== Ice hockey ===
Professional:

- American Hockey League (high-level)
- ECHL (formerly East Coast Hockey League) (mid-level)
- Federal Prospects Hockey League (low-level)
- Ligue Nord-Américaine de Hockey (low-level)
- SPHL (formerly Southern Professional Hockey League) (low-level)

Juniors:

- Canadian Hockey League (CHL; an umbrella organization)
  - Ontario Hockey League (Major junior)
  - Quebec Maritimes Junior Hockey League (Major junior)
  - Western Hockey League (Major junior)
- United States Hockey League (Tier I)

=== Association football (soccer) ===
- United Soccer League
  - USL Championship (men's Division II)
  - USL League One (men's Division III)
- MLS Next Pro (men's Division III)
- National Independent Soccer Association (Division III)
- United Women's Soccer (women's Division III)
- Women's Premier Soccer League (women's Division III)
- Liga de Expansión MX

Announced future leagues:

- NWSL Second Division (women's Division II; planned for 2026)
- WPSL PRO (women's Division II; planned for 2026)

=== Indoor soccer ===
- Major Arena Soccer League 2 (M2)

=== Auto racing ===
- ARCA Menards Series
- American Speed Association
- CRA
- Indy NXT
- USF Pro 2000 Championship
- IMSA SportsCar Challenge
- NASCAR Pinty's Series (Canada)
- NASCAR Peak Mexico Series (Mexico)
- NASCAR Whelen Euro Series (Europe)
- NASCAR Whelen Modified Tour
- NASCAR Whelen Southern Modified Tour
- NASCAR K&N Pro Series East
- NASCAR K&N Pro Series West
- Michelin Pilot Challenge
- GT4 America

=== Cricket ===
- Minor League Cricket

== Africa ==
=== Rugby union ===
- Vodacom Cup (South Africa; now defunct. During the competition's existence, teams from Argentina and Namibia were occasionally included.)
- Rugby Challenge (South Africa; successor to the Vodacom Cup. Includes the same Namibian team that occasionally featured in the Vodacom Cup.)

== Asia ==
=== Baseball ===
- Baseball Challenge League (Japan)
- Eastern League (Japan)
- Kansai Independent Baseball League (Japan, 2008-2013)
- Shikoku-Kyūshū Island League (Japan)
- Western League (Japan)
- Popcorn League (Taiwan) (2014-present)

=== Basketball ===
- National Basketball League (China)
- Philippine Basketball League (Philippines, 1983–2011)
- United Regional Basketball League (Philippines, 2004–2005)
- Liga Pilipinas (Philippines, 2008-2011)
- PBA Developmental League (Philippines, 2011–2024)
- Filsports Basketball Association (Philippines, 2015-2016)
- Pilipinas Commercial Basketball League (Philippines, 2015-2016)
- Pinoyliga (Philippines, 2017–present)
- Community Basketball Association (Philippines, 2019–2020)
- Sinag Liga Asya (Philippines, 2023–present)
- United Collegiate & Schools Athletics Tournament (Philippines, 2026–present)

=== Association football ===
- Perserikatan (Indonesia) (1930–1994)
- K3 League (South Korea) (2007–2019)
- Manila Football League (Philippines, 1930-1967)
- Manila Premier Football League (Philippines, 1997)
- National Football League (Philippines, 1977-1991)
- P-League (Philippines) (1998-1999)
- PFA (now PFF) Major Soccer Series (Philippines, 1967-1972)
- PFF National Men's Club Championship (Philippines) (2011-2015)
- Ang Liga (Philippines, 2003-present)
- Filipino Premier League (Philippines, 2008)
- United Football League (Philippines) (2009-2016)

=== Volleyball ===
- Maharlika Pilipinas Volleyball Association (Philippines, 2023–present)
- Shakey's Super League (Philippines, 2022–present)
- Spikers' Turf (Philippines, 2015–present)
- United Collegiate & Schools Athletics Tournament (Philippines, 2026–present)
- V-League (Philippines) (2022–present)

== Europe ==
=== Motorsports ===
- European Le Mans
- GT4 European Series
- GT4 France Cup

== Oceania ==
=== Association football (soccer) ===
- National Second Division (Australia, from 2025 onwards)
- National Premier Leagues (Australia)

=== Australian rules football ===
- TAC Cup (Victoria)
- South Australian National Football League (South Australia)
- Victorian Football League (Victoria)
- West Australian Football League (Western Australia)
- North East Australian Football League (New South Wales, Queensland, Northern Territory & Australian Capital Territory)

=== Baseball ===
- Darwin Baseball League (Northern Territory)
- Greater Brisbane League (Queensland)
- Illawarra Baseball League (New South Wales)
- New South Wales Major League (New South Wales)

=== Basketball ===
- Big V (Victoria)
- NBL1 (Australia)
  - NBL1 Central (South Australia)
  - NBL1 East (New South Wales and Australian Capital Territory)
  - NBL1 North (Queensland and Northern Territory)
  - NBL1 South (Victoria, Tasmania, and South Australia)
  - NBL1 West (Western Australia)

=== Ice hockey ===
- East Coast Super League (New South Wales)

=== Rugby league ===
- Melbourne Rugby League (Victoria)
- New South Wales Cup (New South Wales)
- Queensland Cup (Queensland)
- S. G. Ball Cup (Australia)

=== Motorsports ===
- Super2 Series
- Super3 Series
- GT4 Australia

== See also ==
- List of top level minor league sports teams in the United States by city
- List of American and Canadian cities by number of major professional sports franchises
- List of professional sports teams in the United States and Canada
- Minor league
