= List of professional golf tournaments in the United States by city =

This is a list of professional golf tournaments in the United States by city.

It does not include touring events such as the U.S. Open, PGA Championship and Ryder Cup.

Rank	City	PGA Tour	PGA Tour Champions	Web.com Tour	LPGA Tour
1	New York City	The Northern Trust			
2	Los Angeles	Los Angeles Open; Humana Challenge	PowerShares QQQ Championship		ANA Inspiration
3	Chicago	BMW Championship	Encompass		
4	Baltimore / Washington				
5	San Jose / San Francisco	Fortinet Championship		Stonebrae	Swinging Skirts
6	Boston				
7	Dallas / Fort Worth	Colonial; Byron Nelson			North Texas LPGA Shootout
8	Philadelphia				ShopRite LPGA Classic
9	Houston	Houston Open	Insperity Invitational		
10	Miami	Honda Classic	Allianz		
11	Atlanta	Tour Championship	Greater Gwinnett		
12	Detroit	Rocket Mortgage Classic	The Ally Challenge		
14	Phoenix	Phoenix Open	Charles Schwab Cup; Championship		JTBC Founders Cup
15	Minneapolis / St. Paul	3M Open	3M Championship		
16	Cleveland	WGC-Bridgestone		Cleveland Open	
18	San Diego	The Sentry			Kia Classic
19	Portland			Portland Open	Portland Classic
20	Orlando	Arnold Palmer; World Challenge			
21	Tampa Bay	Tampa Bay Classic			
24	Charlotte	Quail Hollow			
26	Salt Lake City			Utah Championship	
27	Kansas City			Midwest Classic	
28	Columbus	Memorial Tournament		Nationwide Children's Hospital	
30	San Antonio	Texas Open	AT&T Championship		
31	Las Vegas	Shriners			
32	Cincinnati			Chiquita Classic	
33	Raleigh–Durham		SAS Championship	Rex Hospital Open	
35	Austin	WGC-Match Play			
37	Virginia Beach				Kingsmill Championship
38	Greensboro	Wyndham			
39	Jacksonville	The Players Championship		Web.com Tour Championship	
41	Hartford	Greater Hartford Open			
42	New Orleans	Classic of New Orleans			
43	Grand Rapids				Meijer LPGA Classic
44	Greenville			BMW Charity Pro-Am	
46	Memphis	St. Jude Classic			
47	Birmingham		The Tradition		
56	Knoxville			News Sentinel Open	
60	Cape Coral		ACE Group Classic		Tour Championship
61	Honolulu	Hawaiian Open	Pacific Links Hawai'i		Lotte Championship
92	Augusta	The Masters			
106	Lexington	Barbasol Championship			

== See also ==
- List of American and Canadian cities by number of major professional sports franchises
- List of auto racing tracks in the United States by city
- List of top level minor league sports teams in the United States by city
- List of soccer clubs in the United States by city
