= History of the Charlotte Hornets =

Sports team history

The history of the Charlotte Hornets spans two periods of National Basketball Association basketball in Charlotte, North Carolina. The original Hornets began play as an expansion team in 1988 and relocated to New Orleans in 2002. A separate expansion franchise, the Charlotte Bobcats, began play in 2004. In 2014, the Bobcats adopted the Hornets name and were assigned the records and history of the 1988–2002 Charlotte teams, while the New Orleans organization retained its records and history from 2002 onward.

George Shinn led the group that secured Charlotte's original NBA franchise. The team became one of the league's attendance leaders and first reached the playoffs in 1993. Led at different points by Larry Johnson, Alonzo Mourning, Glen Rice, and Baron Davis, the Hornets made seven playoff appearances between 1993 and 2002. Arena disputes and declining attendance preceded the team's relocation after the 2001–02 season.

A group led by Robert L. Johnson was awarded Charlotte's new expansion franchise in 2002. The Bobcats reached the playoffs in 2010 and 2014, and Michael Jordan became the team's majority owner in 2010. After the Hornets name was restored, Charlotte returned to the playoffs in 2016; Kemba Walker became the franchise's career scoring leader in 2018, and LaMelo Ball won the NBA Rookie of the Year Award in 2021. Jordan sold his majority interest to a group led by Gabe Plotkin and Rick Schnall in 2023. Under the new ownership group, Charlotte improved from 19–63 in 2024–25 to 44–38 in 2025–26 and returned to the play-in tournament. After the season, the Hornets traded Ball to the Minnesota Timberwolves.

== Founding and expansion, 1985–1988 ==
In 1985, the NBA, with 23 teams, was planning to expand by four teams by the 1988–89 season. George Shinn, an entrepreneur from Kannapolis, North Carolina, wanted to bring an NBA team to the Charlotte area, and he assembled a group of prominent local businessmen to head the prospective franchise. The Charlotte area had long been a hotbed for college basketball. The Atlantic Coast Conference's four North Carolina teams had very large and very loyal fan bases in the region, as did local teams UNC Charlotte, Davidson, and Johnson C. Smith. Charlotte was also one of the fastest-growing cities in the United States, and was previously one of the three in-state regional homes to the American Basketball Association's Carolina Cougars.

Some critics doubted that Charlotte, then mostly known for banking, could support an NBA team; one Sacramento Bee columnist joked, "The only franchise Charlotte is going to get is one with Golden Arches." However, Shinn's ace in the hole was the Charlotte Coliseum, a state-of-the-art arena under construction that would seat almost 24,000 spectators – the largest basketball-specific arena to serve as a full-time home for an NBA team. On April 5, 1987, NBA Commissioner David Stern called Shinn to award the NBA's 24th franchise, to begin play in 1988. Franchises were also granted to Miami, Minneapolis-Saint Paul, and Orlando. Playing heavily on the area's support of college basketball, the new team ran billboards in the area saying, "Bringing the NBA to Basketball Country!"

Originally, the team was intended to be named the Charlotte Spirit, but a name-the-team contest yielded "Hornets" as the winning choice. That name was derived from the city's fierce resistance to British occupation during the Revolutionary War, which prompted the British commander, Lord Cornwallis, to refer to it as "a veritable hornet's nest of rebellion". The name had been used for previous Charlotte sports teams, including a minor league baseball team from 1901 to 1972, and a World Football League team that played there from 1974 to 1975. In addition the Charlotte 49ers and Davidson Wildcats of the NCAA play annually for the Hornets' Nest Trophy.

The team received attention when it chose teal as its primary color, setting off a sports fashion craze in the late 1980s and early 1990s, with many pro and amateur clubs soon following with teal in their color schemes. The team's uniforms were designed by international designer and North Carolina native Alexander Julian, and featured a first for NBA uniforms—pinstripes. Similar designs by the Orlando Magic, Toronto Raptors, Houston Rockets, Chicago Bulls, and Indiana Pacers followed soon after.

Shinn hired Carl Scheer, a longtime NBA executive, as the team's first general manager. Scheer sought a roster of veteran players, hoping to put together a competitive team as soon as possible, with a goal of making the playoffs in five years. Former college coach and veteran NBA assistant Dick Harter was hired as the team's first head coach.

In 1988, the Hornets and the Miami Heat were part of the 1988 NBA expansion draft. Unlike many expansion franchises that invest in the future with a team composed entirely of young players, Charlotte stocked its inaugural roster with several veterans in hopes of putting a competitive lineup on the court right away. The team also had three draft picks at the 1988 NBA draft.

== Original Charlotte Hornets, 1988–2002 ==
=== Early seasons, 1988–1991 ===
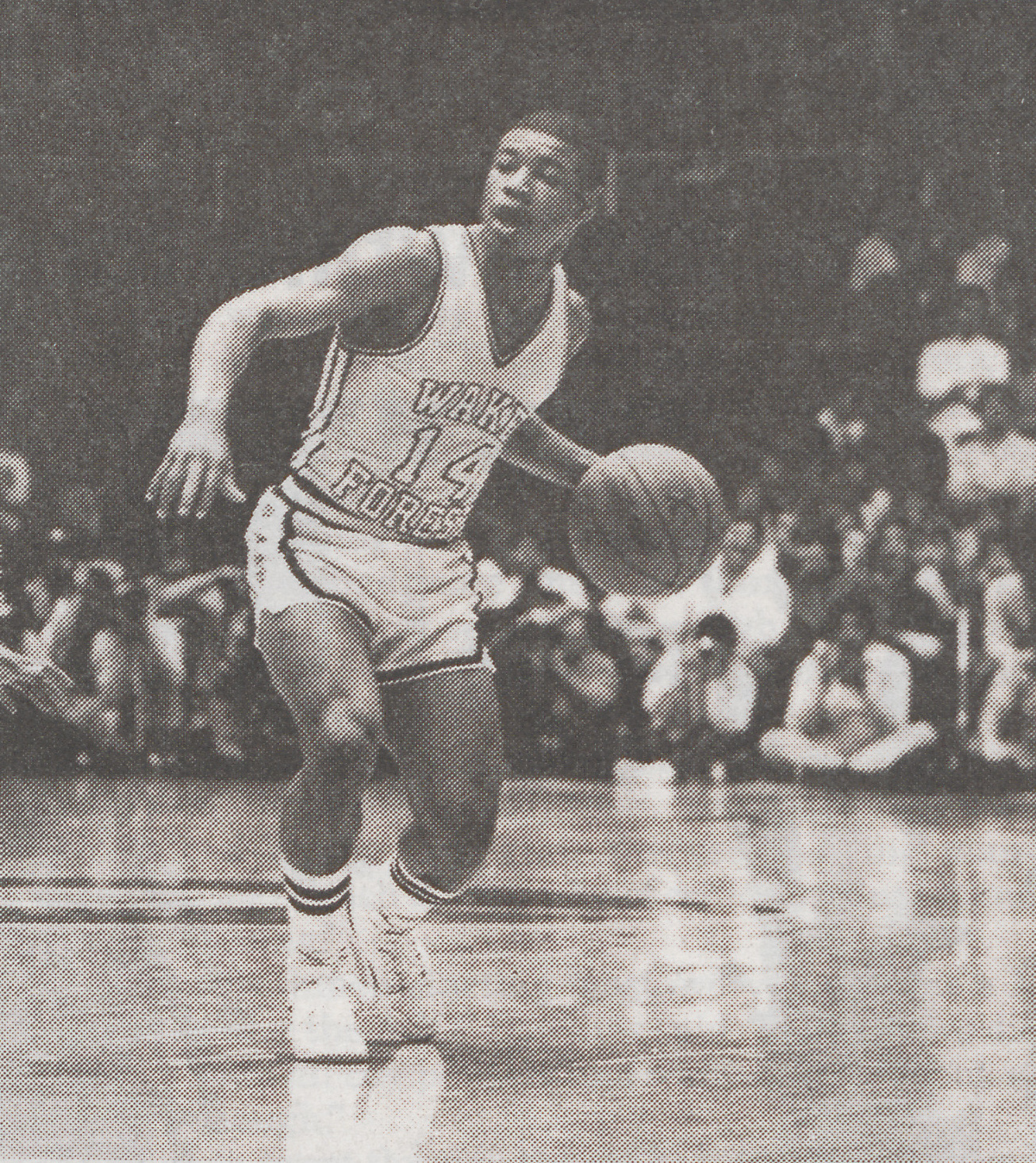
Muggsy Bogues (pictured here with Wake Forest), the shortest player in NBA history played for the Hornets from 1988 until 1997

The Hornets' inaugural roster was led by guard Kelly Tripucka, first-round pick Rex Chapman, and point guard Muggsy Bogues. Charlotte played its first NBA game on November 4, 1988, losing 133–93 to the Cleveland Cavaliers, and finished the 1988–89 season with a 20–62 record. Despite concerns about the size of the Charlotte Coliseum, the Hornets led the NBA in attendance during their first season and eventually sold out 364 consecutive games.

Head coach Dick Harter was fired during the 1989–90 season and replaced on an interim basis by assistant Gene Littles. Charlotte finished 19–63. The Hornets selected guard Kendall Gill with the fifth pick in the 1990 NBA draft. They improved to 26–56 in 1990–91 and hosted the 1991 NBA All-Star Game, after which Littles was replaced by general manager Allan Bristow.

=== Johnson and Mourning era, 1991–1995 ===
With the first pick in the 1991 NBA draft, the Hornets selected Larry Johnson from UNLV. Johnson won the 1992 NBA Rookie of the Year Award, and Charlotte improved to 31–51 in the 1991–92 season.

Charlotte selected center Alonzo Mourning with the second pick in the 1992 NBA draft, pairing him with Johnson and Kendall Gill. The Hornets finished the 1992–93 season 44–38, their first winning record, and qualified for the playoffs for the first time. Mourning's late basket in Game 4 gave Charlotte a first-round series victory over the Boston Celtics, before the New York Knicks eliminated the Hornets in the conference semifinals.

Charlotte missed the playoffs in 1993–94. The team won 50 games and returned to the postseason in 1994–95. The Chicago Bulls eliminated the Hornets in the first round.

=== Glen Rice era, 1995–1998 ===
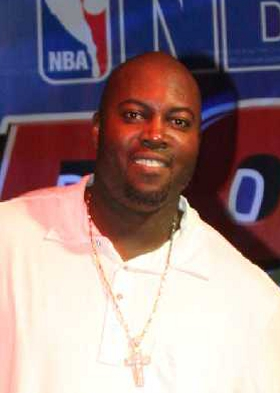
Glen Rice

Before the 1995–96 season, the Hornets traded Mourning to the Miami Heat for Glen Rice, Matt Geiger, and Khalid Reeves. Rice led Charlotte in scoring, but the team finished 41–41 and missed the playoffs; Dave Cowens replaced Allan Bristow as head coach after the season.

Charlotte traded Johnson to the New York Knicks in 1996 and sent the draft rights to Kobe Bryant to the Los Angeles Lakers for center Vlade Divac. The reshaped team set a franchise record with 54 wins in 1996–97. Rice finished third in the league in scoring. He made the All-NBA Second Team and was named MVP of the 1997 NBA All-Star Game. The Knicks swept Charlotte in the first round.

The Hornets followed with a 51–31 record in 1997–98. Rice earned All-NBA Third Team honors, and Charlotte advanced to the conference semifinals before losing to the Chicago Bulls.

=== Final playing seasons, 1998–2002 ===
During the lockout-shortened 1998–99 season, Charlotte traded Rice to the Los Angeles Lakers for Eddie Jones and Elden Campbell. Cowens resigned during the season and was replaced by Paul Silas; the Hornets finished 26–24 and missed the playoffs.

The Hornets selected point guard Baron Davis with the third pick in the 1999 NBA draft. During the 1999–2000 season, guard Bobby Phills was killed in an automobile accident, and the team retired his No. 13. Charlotte finished 49–33 and lost to the Philadelphia 76ers in the first round of the playoffs. That year, negotiations for Michael Jordan to join the ownership group ended when Shinn would not grant him control of basketball operations.

Charlotte reached the conference semifinals in each of its final two seasons before relocation. The 2000–01 team finished 46–36, swept the Miami Heat in the first round, and lost to the Milwaukee Bucks in seven games. In 2001–02, the Hornets went 44–38, defeated the Orlando Magic, and lost to the New Jersey Nets in five games. The league approved the relocation to New Orleans before the playoffs ended.

=== Arena dispute and relocation, 1997–2002 ===
Many attributed the Hornets lapse in popularity during the late 1990s and early 2000s to the team's owner, George Shinn, who was slowly becoming hated by the fans. In 1997, a Charlotte woman claimed that Shinn had raped her, and the subsequent trial severely tarnished his reputation. The consensus was that while Charlotte was as basketball-crazy as ever, fans took out their anger at Shinn on the team. Shinn was also discontented with the Charlotte Coliseum, which, although considered state-of-the-art when it opened in 1988, had a limited number of luxury boxes. On March 26, 2001, both the Hornets and the Vancouver Grizzlies applied for relocation to Memphis, Tennessee, which was ultimately won by the Grizzlies. Shinn issued an ultimatum: unless the city built a new arena at no cost to him, the Hornets would leave town. The city initially refused, leading Shinn to consider moving the team to either Norfolk, Louisville, or St. Louis.

Of the cities in the running, only St. Louis had an NBA-ready arena (Savvis Center, now known as the Enterprise Center) already in place and was a larger media market than Charlotte at the time; also, it was the only one of the four to have a previously had hosted an NBA franchise — the St. Louis Hawks (who moved to Atlanta in 1968). However, Savvis Center was eventually ruled out in large part because it already hosted a National Hockey League team whose primary tenants (the St. Louis Blues) were guaranteed priority for scheduling even if an NBA team moved there. Also, at the time St. Louis already had teams in both of the other two "Big Four" major professional sports leagues — the market was smaller than any other at the time with teams in all four except for Denver, which has proven able to support four teams due to its relative isolation from other major sports markets.

Finally, a new arena in Uptown, which would eventually become the Charlotte Bobcats Arena (later to become Time Warner Cable Arena and now known as the Spectrum Center), was included in a non-binding referendum for a larger arts-related package, and Shinn withdrew his application to move the team. Polls showed the referendum on its way to passage. However, just days before the referendum, Mayor Pat McCrory vetoed a living wage ordinance. The veto prompted many of the city's black ministers to oppose the referendum. They felt it was immoral for the city to build a new arena when city employees weren't paid enough to make a living. After the referendum failed, city leaders devised a plan to build a new arena that did not require voter support, but made it known that they would not consider building it unless Shinn sold the team. While even the NBA acknowledged that Shinn had alienated fans, league officials felt such a demand would anger other owners as it could set a precedent.

The city council refused to remove the statement, leading the Hornets to request a move to New Orleans – a move which would eventually return pro basketball to the city after the Jazz moved to Salt Lake City in 1979. The NBA approved the move and as part of the deal, as well as to avoid a Cleveland Browns-like lawsuit, the NBA promised that Charlotte would get a new expansion franchise, although unlike the arrangement agreed to in 1996 by the NFL for Cleveland, the NBA also agreed at the time to allow Shinn to relocate the extant Hornets' franchise, name, history and records to New Orleans.

== Charlotte Bobcats, 2002–2014 ==
=== Expansion award and team establishment, 2002–2004 ===
Long before the New Orleans relocation, the then-29-team NBA had been seriously considering adding another franchise in order to balance its divisions and conferences. The league soon made it known it would be receptive to placing that team in Charlotte for the 2004–05 season, if an arena deal could be reached. Several ownership groups, including one led by former Boston Celtics star Larry Bird, made bids for the franchise. On December 18, 2002, a group led by Black Entertainment Television founder Robert L. Johnson was awarded the franchise, with Johnson becoming the first African American majority owner in major U.S. professional sports. The rapper Nelly became a minority owner.

In June 2003, the team was named the Bobcats. The Charlotte Regional Sports Commission "Help Name The Team" effort drew over 1,250 suggestions. The three finalists were Bobcats, Dragons, and the eventual winner Flight, referencing North Carolina's "First in Flight" status due to the Wright Flyer as well as the state's military bases. But "Flight" was eventually discarded by Johnson and the team, being considered too abstract and reminiscent of the then-current Iraq War aerial strikes. During the summer of 2003, at a street festival crowd of 7,000 fans, the franchise unveiled "Bobcats" as the team name. The bobcat, according to the North Carolina Wildlife Commission, is an athletic, fierce predator indigenous to the Carolinas. Since Charlotte was already home to the Carolina Panthers of the National Football League, designer Chris Weiller created the team logo to alay confusion or close comparison. There was suspicion that owner Robert "Bob" Johnson chose "Bobcats" as a play on his name.

The Bobcats hired Bernie Bickerstaff as the first head coach and general manager. A new arena to host the Bobcats at uptown Charlotte began construction in July 2003, and the team played its home games at the Coliseum until the new building was ready. After failed attempts at the ballot box to force the team to fully fund the arena, city politicians implemented a hotel and leisure tax in Charlotte to help pay for it.

=== Early seasons, 2004–2008 ===
The Bobcats assembled their first roster through the 2004 expansion draft, which brought Gerald Wallace to Charlotte. Charlotte also acquired the second pick in the 2004 NBA draft and selected center Emeka Okafor. The Bobcats finished the inaugural season 18–64, and Okafor won the NBA Rookie of the Year Award.

The team moved into the new Charlotte Bobcats Arena during the 2005–06 season and improved to 26–56. After the season, Michael Jordan purchased a minority stake and assumed control of basketball operations.

Charlotte improved to 33–49 in 2006–07, the final season of Bernie Bickerstaff's tenure as head coach. Sam Vincent replaced him but was dismissed after the Bobcats went 32–50 in 2007–08.

=== Larry Brown and first playoff berth, 2008–2010 ===
The Bobcats hired Hall of Fame coach Larry Brown in April 2008. Charlotte improved to 35–47 in the 2008–09 season, narrowly missing the playoffs. Owner Robert L. Johnson subsequently put the franchise up for sale.

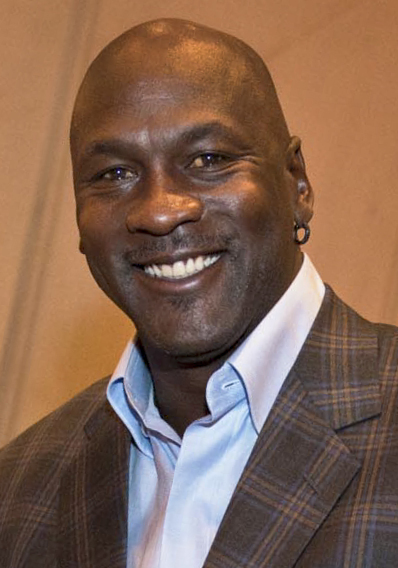
Jordan became the majority owner of the Bobcats franchise in 2010

In February 2010, Johnson agreed to sell the Bobcats to Jordan, who became the first former NBA player to serve as majority owner of a league franchise. The 2009–10 Bobcats finished 44–38, their first winning record, and qualified for the playoffs for the first time. Gerald Wallace became the first Bobcats player selected for the NBA All-Star Game, but the Orlando Magic swept Charlotte in the first round.

=== Drafting Kemba Walker and rebuilding, 2010–2013 ===
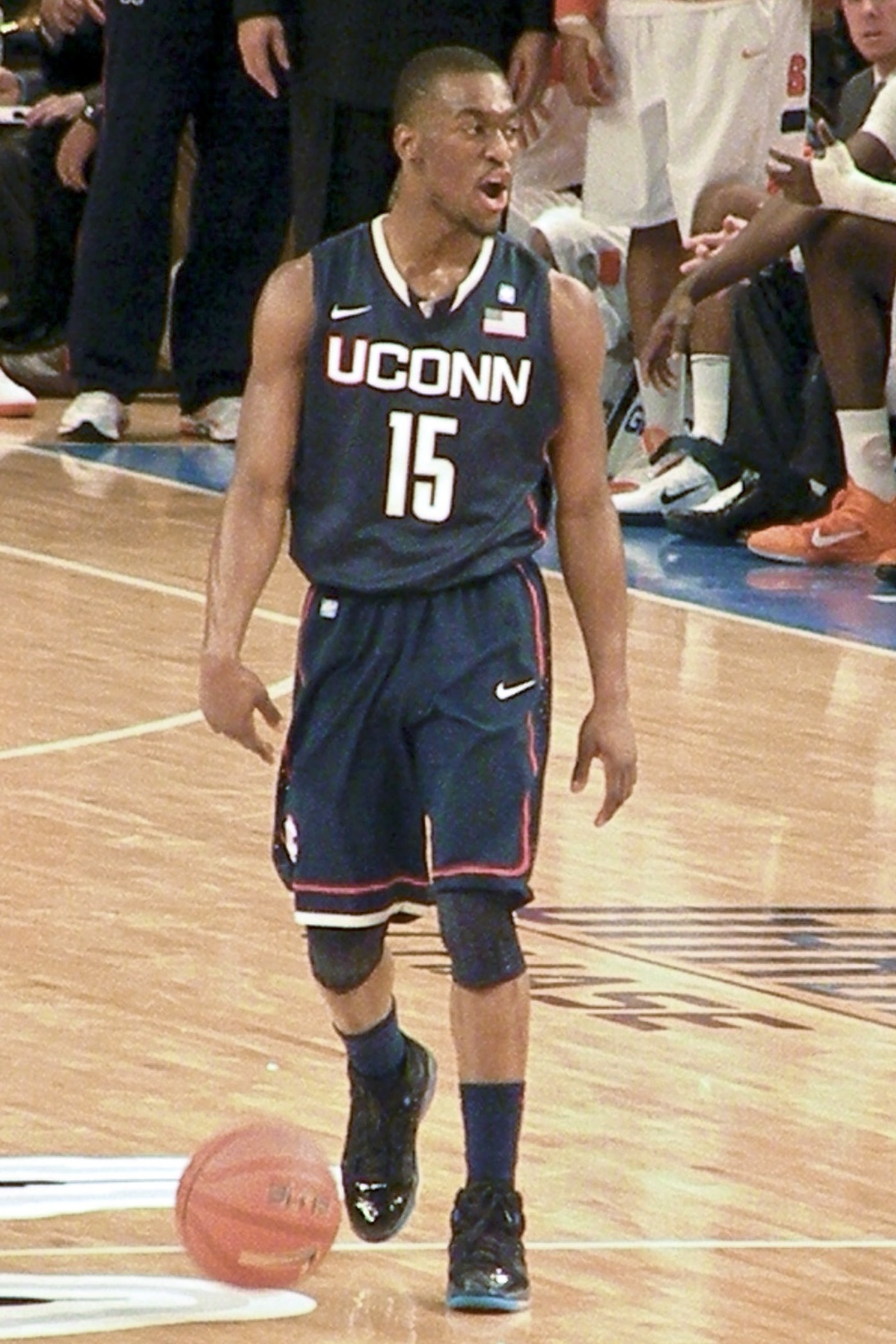
The Hornets drafted Kemba Walker from UConn with the ninth pick of the 2011 NBA draft

Brown left the team after a 9–19 start to the 2010–11 season, and former Hornets coach Paul Silas returned as his replacement. Charlotte finished 34–48 and began rebuilding, including a trade that sent Gerald Wallace to the Portland Trail Blazers for draft assets.

In the 2011 NBA draft, the Bobcats selected Kemba Walker with the ninth pick. The lockout-shortened 2011–12 season ended with a 7–59 record, giving Charlotte an NBA-record .106 winning percentage. Silas did not return, and Mike Dunlap was hired as head coach.

The Bobcats finished 21–61 in the 2012–13 season, after which Dunlap was dismissed and replaced by Steve Clifford.

=== Final Bobcats season and restoration of the Hornets name, 2013–2014 ===
On May 21, 2013, Jordan announced that the franchise had applied to adopt the Charlotte Hornets name beginning with the 2014–15 season. The NBA Board of Governors unanimously approved the change on July 18. Charlotte later unveiled a teal-and-purple color scheme, a new logo, and the "Buzz City" campaign for the restored identity.

The Bobcats signed center Al Jefferson during the 2013 offseason. In the final Bobcats season, Charlotte finished 43–39 and reached the playoffs for the second time as the Bobcats. The defending champion Miami Heat swept Charlotte in the first round, ending the Bobcats era.

== Charlotte Hornets, 2014–present ==
=== Restoration of the Hornets identity, 2014–2015 ===
On May 20, 2014, the Bobcats officially adopted the Charlotte Hornets name. Team officials also announced that the Hornets, Pelicans, and the NBA made an agreement, in which the renamed franchise had been assigned the history and records of the 1988–2002 Charlotte teams, while the New Orleans organization retained its records and history from 2002 onward. Charlotte had already been using footage of the original Hornets as part of the "Buzz City" campaign.

In the first season under the restored identity, the Hornets finished 33–49 and missed the playoffs. On November 1, 2014, the Hornets retired Phills' jersey number a second time; when they were the Bobcats, they did not issue number 13 out of respect to Phills. It currently hangs from the rafters of the Spectrum Center.

=== Return to the playoffs, 2015–2017 ===
Charlotte reshaped its roster before the 2015–16 season, most notably acquiring Nicolas Batum and signing Jeremy Lin. The Hornets finished 48–34, their highest win total since 1999–2000, and earned the sixth seed in the Eastern Conference. Charlotte defeated the Miami Heat in Game 3 for its first playoff victory since 2002 and extended the series to seven games before being eliminated.

Kemba Walker was selected for his first NBA All-Star Game in 2017. Charlotte finished the 2016–17 season 36–46 and missed the playoffs.

=== Final Kemba Walker seasons, 2017–2019 ===
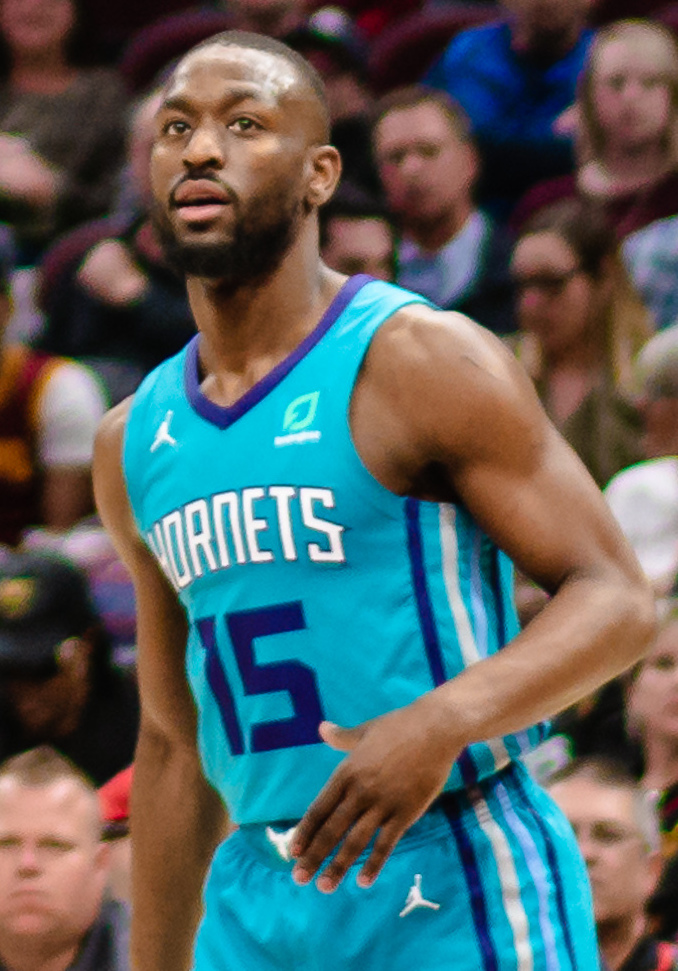
Walker became the Hornets' career scoring leader after surpassing Dell Curry

Walker made a second consecutive All-Star appearance in 2018 and, on March 28, surpassed Dell Curry as the franchise's career scoring leader. The Hornets finished the 2017–18 season 36–46 and missed the playoffs for a second consecutive season. During the organizational changes that followed, Mitch Kupchak replaced Rich Cho as general manager, Steve Clifford was dismissed, and James Borrego became head coach.

Charlotte hosted the 2019 NBA All-Star Game, with Walker selected as a starter. The Hornets were eliminated from playoff contention on the final day of the 2018–19 regular season, their third consecutive season outside the postseason.

=== Post-Walker transition and pandemic-shortened season, 2019–2020 ===
In July 2019, Charlotte sent Walker and a future second-round pick to the Boston Celtics in a sign-and-trade for Terry Rozier and a future second-round pick, ending Walker's eight-season tenure with the franchise.

The Hornets were 23–42 when the NBA suspended the 2019–20 season in March 2020 because of the COVID-19 pandemic. Charlotte was one of eight teams not invited to the league's restart at the 2020 NBA Bubble, ending the franchise's season.

=== Ball's arrival and play-in appearances, 2020–2022 ===
With the third pick in the 2020 NBA draft, the Hornets selected guard LaMelo Ball. Later that month, Charlotte acquired forward Gordon Hayward in a sign-and-trade with the Boston Celtics. The Hornets finished the shortened 2020–21 season with a 33–39 record and qualified for the play-in tournament, where the Indiana Pacers eliminated them, 144–117. Ball was named NBA Rookie of the Year, becoming the third Charlotte player to receive the award after Larry Johnson and Emeka Okafor.

Charlotte improved to 43–39 in the 2021–22 season but again finished tenth in the Eastern Conference. The Hornets lost 132–103 to the Atlanta Hawks in the play-in tournament, and the team dismissed head coach James Borrego after the season.

=== Clifford's return and ownership transition, 2022–2024 ===
The Hornets rehired Steve Clifford as head coach on June 24, 2022, beginning his second tenure with the team. During the 2022–23 season, Charlotte's players missed a combined 258 games because of injuries, and the team finished 27–55. The Hornets received the second pick in the 2023 NBA draft and selected forward Brandon Miller. On August 3, 2023, the sale of Jordan's majority stake to a group led by Plotkin and Schnall was finalized; Jordan retained a minority interest.

The Hornets finished the 2023–24 season with a 21–61 record. During the season, Mitch Kupchak moved into an advisory role and the team appointed Jeff Peterson as executive vice president of basketball operations. After Clifford announced that the season would be his last as head coach, Charlotte hired Charles Lee on May 9, 2024. Miller was named to the All-Rookie First Team, and the Hornets selected forward Tidjane Salaün with the sixth pick in the 2024 NBA draft.

=== Organizational reset, 2024–present ===
In Lee's first season, injuries again affected the roster, including season-ending injuries to Ball and Miller, and Charlotte finished the 2024–25 season with a 19–63 record. The Hornets selected Kon Knueppel with the fourth pick in the 2025 NBA draft.

Charlotte improved by 25 wins in the 2025–26 season, finishing 44–38 and ninth in the Eastern Conference. Knueppel was a unanimous All-Rookie First Team selection and finished second to Cooper Flagg in Rookie of the Year voting. In the 2026 play-in tournament, the Hornets defeated the Miami Heat 127–126 in overtime before losing 121–90 to the Orlando Magic in the game for the Eastern Conference's eighth playoff seed.

In the 2026 NBA draft, Charlotte selected Hannes Steinbach and Christian Anderson Jr. with the 14th and 18th picks, respectively. In July, the Hornets traded Ball and Josh Green to the Minnesota Timberwolves in a four-team deal that brought back Naz Reid, Mo Gueye, and multiple draft assets. Charlotte subsequently traded Miles Bridges and two draft picks to the Phoenix Suns for Grayson Allen, Royce O'Neale, and a 2033 first-round pick.
