= List of American and Canadian cities by number of major professional sports teams =

This is a list of urban areas in the United States and Canada categorized by the number of major professional sports teams in their urban areas.

== Major professional sports leagues ==
The major professional sports leagues, or simply major leagues, in the United States and Canada are the highest professional competitions of team sports in the two countries. Although individual sports such as golf, mixed martial arts, tennis, and auto racing are also very popular, the term is usually limited to team sports.

The term "major league" was first used in 1921 in reference to Major League Baseball (MLB), the top level of professional baseball. Today, in addition to MLB, other major professional sports leagues in the United States and Canada are the National Basketball Association (NBA), the National Football League (NFL) and the National Hockey League (NHL). These four leagues are also commonly referred to as the "Big Four". Each is the richest professional club competition in its respective sport worldwide. The best players can become cultural icons in both countries and elsewhere in the world, because the leagues enjoy a significant place in popular culture in the U.S. and Canada. The NFL and NHL each have 32 teams, while the MLB and NBA each have 30 teams.

Baseball, football, and ice hockey have had professional leagues for over 100 years; early leagues such as the National Association, Ohio League and National Hockey Association formed the basis of the modern MLB, NFL, and NHL, respectively. Basketball is a relatively new development; the NBA evolved when the National Basketball League and the Basketball Association of America merged, taking on its current form in 1949. The fifth biggest professional sports league is Major League Soccer (MLS), which also has 30 teams. While soccer is very popular globally, it had struggled to become established in the U.S. and Canada, with several professional leagues starting and folding before MLS was founded in 1996. The Canadian Football League (CFL), a much smaller league (9 teams), was founded in 1958 and is popular in Canada. All six of these leagues draw 15,000 or more fans in attendance per game on average as of 2015. This list includes a ranking by teams in the Big Four (B4) and a separate ranking including MLS and CFL teams called the Big Six (B6).

The most recent market to receive a new Big Four team is Salt Lake City, Utah, in which the NHL's Utah Mammoth made its debut in the 2024–25 season. The largest urban area without a team in one of the Big Four leagues is the 31st-ranked Austin region, though it does have an MLS team. The largest urban area without a team in one of the Big Six leagues is the 39th-ranked Hampton Roads region.

== Teams by urban area ==
The following list contains all urban areas in the United States and Canada containing at least one team in any of the six major leagues. The number of teams in the Big Four leagues (B4) (NFL, MLB, NBA, and NHL) and the Big Six leagues (B6) (aforementioned leagues plus MLS and CFL) are included in the table below. No urban area has teams in all six leagues, as NFL teams are exclusively in the United States and CFL teams are exclusively in Canada. There are currently 12 urban areas (11 in the United States and 1 in Canada) with teams in five of the six leagues (MLB, MLS, NBA, NHL, and NFL (United States) or CFL (Canada)).

Urban area	Country	Pop. rank	Population (2025 est.)	B4	NFL	MLB	NBA	NHL	B6	MLS	CFL
New York City	United States	1	20,892,000	9	Giants; Jets (Note: Seven NFL teams have previously played in the New York City area: the New York Giants (1921; no relation to the current Giants), the Brooklyn Lions/Horsemen 1926, the New York Yankees (1927-1929), the Orange/Newark Tornadoes (1929-1930), the Staten Island Stapletons (1929-1932), the Brooklyn Dodgers/Tigers/Yanks (1930-1945) and the New York Bulldogs/Yanks (1949-1951).)	Yankees; Mets (Note: The New York Mutuals played in the National League's inaugural season in 1876, but were expelled at the end of that season. The next year, the Hartford Dark Blues moved to nearby Brooklyn (then an independent city) and played the 1877 season as the Hartfords before it dissolved. The Gothams/Giants played in Manhattan from 1883 and the Brooklyn Atlantics/Grays/Bridegrooms/Grooms/Bridegrooms/Superbas/Trolley Dodgers/Superbas/Robins/Dodgers played in Brooklyn (which became part of New York City in 1898) from 1890 (when it joined the NL from the AA); both teams respectively moved to San Francisco and Los Angeles in 1958. Before the move to the West Coast, the Dodgers played several home games in Jersey City at Roosevelt Stadium. The Newark Peppers were a member of the Federal League in 1915.)	Knicks; Nets	Rangers; Islanders; Devils (Note: The New York/Brooklyn Americans played in the NHL from 1925 until suspending operations in 1942, and were disbanded in 1946.)	11	Red Bulls; New York City FC	—
Los Angeles	United States	2	15,582,000	8	Rams; Chargers (Note: The Rams and Chargers are both in their second stints in the Los Angeles market. The Rams arrived from Cleveland in 1946 and played in the L.A. area until moving to St. Louis after the 1995 season; they would return to L.A. in 2016. The Chargers were originally based in Los Angeles, playing there for the AFL's first season in 1960 before moving to San Diego, where they would play until returning to L.A. in 2017. In addition to the Rams and Chargers, two other NFL teams have called Los Angeles home. The Buccaneers (no relation to NFL franchise in Tampa) played in the 1926 season; despite representing Los Angeles, the team operated out of Chicago because of the difficulty of transcontinental travel in the era before modern air travel. The Oakland Raiders played in Los Angeles from 1982 to 1994, before they moved back to Oakland.)	Dodgers; Angels	Lakers; Clippers	Kings; Ducks	10	Galaxy; Los Angeles FC (Note: Club Deportivo Chivas USA was a Major League Soccer club that existed between 2005 and 2014 before folding.)	—
Chicago	United States	3	8,790,000	5	Bears (Note: The Chicago Tigers played one season in the NFL (then APFA) in 1920, while the Chicago Cardinals were a charter franchise of the NFL, before moving to St. Louis in 1960.)	Cubs; White Sox	Bulls (Note: Chicago has had two prior NBA teams: the Stags existed from 1946 to 1950 before folding and the Packers/Zephyrs played from 1961 to 1963, before moving to Baltimore.)	Blackhawks	6	Fire	—
Washington–Baltimore	United States	4	7,636,000	6	Commanders; Ravens (Note: The Washington Senators played 1 season in the NFL (then APFA) in 1921. The Commanders were known as the Redskins from 1937, when they moved from Boston, until 2020 when the name was temporarily changed to the Washington Football Team; the Commanders name was adopted in 2022. Baltimore was home to two NFL teams, both named the Colts. The original Colts played in the 1950 NFL season before folding, while the second Colts team played from 1953 until it relocated to Indianapolis following the 1983 season.)	Nationals; Orioles (Note: Before the then-Montreal Expos moved to Washington in 2005, four MLB teams (two per league) had played in Washington. In the National League, the original Nationals played from 1886 to 1889. Three teams also played under the name of the Washington Senators: The NL's Senators, who played from 1892 until it was contracted in 1899, and two American League Senators teams (the Senators/Nationals/Senators, who moved to Minneapolis in 1960 and a new Senators team which moved to Dallas in 1971). The original Orioles joined the National League in 1892 from the defunct American Association and played there until they were contracted from the NL in 1899. Another Orioles team played in the American League for two years, before dissolving after the 1902 season.)	Wizards (Note: The Washington Capitols were a charter member of what became the NBA; the team dissolved midway through the 1950-1951 season. Baltimore was home to two NBA teams, both named the Bullets. The original Bullets played in the American Basketball League and NBA from 1944 to 1954. The second team was founded in 1963, following the relocation of the Chicago Zephyrs to Maryland. For the next 11 seasons, the Bullets played in Baltimore before moving to Landover, Maryland, within the Washington, D.C. metropolitan area, in 1973.)	Capitals	7	D.C. United	(Note: Baltimore was granted a CFL expansion franchise in 1994, the Baltimore Stallions, which relocated to Montreal after the 1995 season to become the current Montreal Alouettes.)
Boston	United States	5	7,375,000	4	Patriots (Note: Before the Patriots joined the NFL as a result of the AFL-NFL merger in 1970, three other NFL teams had played in Boston: the Bulldogs (1929, disbanded), the Braves/Redskins (1932-1936, moved to Washington) and the Yanks (1944-1948, moved to New York and became the Bulldogs).)	Red Sox (Note: The Red Caps/Beaneaters/Doves/Rustlers/Braves/Bees/Braves played in the National League from the league's 1876 inception until it moved to Milwaukee in 1953.)	Celtics	Bruins	5	Revolution	—
Dallas–Fort Worth	United States	6	6,980,000	4	Cowboys (Note: Two other top-level football teams have played as the Dallas Texans. The first Texans played in the NFL for one season in 1952. The second Texans were one of the eight original teams of the AFL in 1960, and played under that name through the 1962 season, after which they moved to Kansas City, Missouri and began play under their current name of Kansas City Chiefs.)	Rangers	Mavericks	Stars	5	FC Dallas	—
Houston	United States	7	6,804,000	3	Texans (Note: Houston hosted the Houston Oilers from 1960 (where they played in the AFL until its merger with the NFL in 1970) through 1996 when the team moved to Tennessee—initially being called the Tennessee Oilers in its first season in Memphis and its second season in Nashville until ultimately being renamed the Tennessee Titans upon the opening of the team's current Nashville stadium in 1999.)	Astros	Rockets	—	4	Dynamo	—
Toronto–Hamilton	Canada	8	6,400,000	3	(Note: While Toronto has not had an NFL franchise, the Buffalo Bills did host one of the team's regular season games each year and a number of pre-season games at the Rogers Centre from 2008 to 2013 as part of the Bills Toronto Series.)	Blue Jays	Raptors (Note: The Toronto Huskies played in the inaugural season of what would become the NBA, before dissolving. The Buffalo Braves were an NBA team that played a total of 16 home games in Toronto from 1971 to 1975.)	Maple Leafs (Note: The Hamilton Tigers played in the NHL from 1920 to 1925 before relocating to New York City to become the New York Americans; that team folded in 1946.)	6	Toronto FC	Argonauts; Tiger-Cats
San Francisco Bay Area	United States	9	6,376,000	4	49ers (Note: The Oakland Raiders called Oakland home from 1960 until 1982 and again from 1995 until 2019 before relocating to Las Vegas becoming the Las Vegas Raiders.)	Giants (Note: The Oakland Athletics played in Oakland from 1968 until 2024, before temporarily relocating to West Sacramento, California for the 2025–27 seasons, while awaiting the opening of their permanent new ballpark in Las Vegas, currently planned for 2028.)	Warriors	Sharks (Note: The California Golden Seals were an NHL expansion team which played in Oakland from 1967–76, when they moved to Cleveland to become the Cleveland Barons.)	5	Earthquakes	—
Miami–Fort Lauderdale	United States	10	6,129,000	4	Dolphins	Marlins	Heat	Panthers	5	Inter Miami CF (Note: Miami Fusion F.C. was an MLS club located in Fort Lauderdale, Florida that played from 1998 to 2001 when they folded.)	—
Philadelphia	United States	11	5,697,000	4	Eagles (Note: The Frankford Yellow Jackets played from 1924 to 1931.)	Phillies (Note: The Athletics played in the National League's inaugural season in 1876, before being expelled from the league. Another Athletics team was established in the American League in 1901 and played until 1954, when the team moved to Kansas City.)	76ers (Note: The Philadelphia Warriors played from 1946 to 1962.)	Flyers (Note: The Quakers played in the NHL for the 1930-1931 season. Afterwards, the team suspended operations for the next five years before officially announcing their dissolution in 1936.)	5	Union	—
Atlanta	United States	12	5,495,000	3	Falcons	Braves	Hawks	(Note: The NHL expanded to Atlanta in 1972 with the Atlanta Flames, but the team departed for Calgary, Alberta in 1980 to become the Calgary Flames. In 1999 another expansion franchise, the Atlanta Thrashers, was established, but this team moved to Winnipeg and became the current Winnipeg Jets in 2011.)	4	United FC	—
Phoenix	United States	13	4,600,000	3	Cardinals	Diamondbacks	Suns	(Note: The Arizona Coyotes played from 1996 to 2024, when the franchise was declared inactive and its assets acquired by an expansion team in Salt Lake City due to the lack of a suitable home arena. The franchise subsequently ceased operations after failing to secure a new arena.)	3	—	—
Detroit	United States	14	4,143,000	4	Lions (Note: Detroit was home to the NFL (then APFA) Detroit Heralds/Tigers from 1920 to 1921, the Detroit Panthers from 1925 to 1926, and finally the Detroit Wolverines in 1928.)	Tigers (Note: The Detroit Wolverines played in the National League from 1881 until the team disbanded in 1888.)	Pistons (Note: The Detroit Falcons played in the inaugural season of what would become the NBA, but disbanded following that season.)	Red Wings	4	—	—
Montreal	Canada	15	4,029,000	1	—	(Note: Montreal was home to a Major League Baseball team, the Montreal Expos, beginning in 1969. However, the team moved to Washington, D.C., in 2005, where it was renamed as the Washington Nationals.)	—	Canadiens (Note: Montreal was home to two other NHL clubs. The Montreal Wanderers who played a portion of the NHL's inaugural 1917/18 season, and the Montreal Maroons who played in the NHL from 1924 to 1938.)	3	CF Montréal	Alouettes
Seattle	United States	16	3,952,000	3	Seahawks	Mariners (Note: The Seattle Pilots played one season in 1969, before moving to Milwaukee and becoming the Brewers.)	(Note: The Seattle SuperSonics began play in 1967, but in 2008 was moved to Oklahoma City and was renamed as the Oklahoma City Thunder.)	Kraken	4	Sounders FC	—
Orlando	United States	17	3,204,000	1	—	—	Magic	—	2	Orlando City SC	—
Tampa Bay Area	United States	18	3,180,000	3	Buccaneers	Rays	(Note: The Toronto Raptors temporarily played in Tampa in Amalie Arena due to the COVID-19 pandemic in 2020-21.)	Lightning	3	(Note: The Tampa Bay Mutiny was a charter franchise of MLS in 1996. However, the franchise folded in 2001.)	—
San Diego	United States	19	3,053,000	1	(Note: San Diego hosted the San Diego Chargers from 1961 (where they initially played in the AFL until the league's merger with the NFL in 1970) through 2016, at which point the team moved back to its original city of Los Angeles for the 2017 season.)	Padres	(Note: San Diego has had two NBA franchises: the San Diego Rockets and the San Diego Clippers. The Rockets represented San Diego from 1967 until 1971 when they moved to Houston, Texas to become the Houston Rockets. Seven years later, the Buffalo Braves moved to town and were renamed the San Diego Clippers, where they played until 1984, when the team relocated to Los Angeles and became the Los Angeles Clippers.)	—	2	San Diego FC	—
Minneapolis–Saint Paul	United States	20	2,904,000	4	Vikings (Note: The Minneapolis Marines/Red Jackets played in the NFL from 1921 to 1924 and again from 1929 to 1930.)	Twins	Timberwolves (Note: The Minneapolis Lakers played in the NBA (formerly BAA) from 1947 to 1960, when the team moved to Los Angeles to become the Los Angeles Lakers.)	Wild (Note: The Minnesota North Stars were an NHL expansion team that played in Bloomington from 1967 to 1993, when the team moved to Dallas and became the Dallas Stars.)	5	United FC	—
Denver	United States	21	2,892,000	4	Broncos	Rockies	Nuggets (Note: The Denver Nuggets joined the NBA in 1949 as a result of the BAA's merger with the NBL, but dissolved following their first NBA season; the current Denver Nuggets joined the NBA as part of the ABA–NBA merger of 1976 and are not related to the original Nuggets.)	Avalanche (Note: The Kansas City Scouts relocated to become the Colorado Rockies in 1976, but subsequently moved again and were renamed the New Jersey Devils in 1982. The current Colorado Avalanche were established when the Quebec Nordiques relocated from Quebec City in 1995.)	5	Rapids	—
Vancouver	Canada	22	2,833,000	1	—	—	(Note: The expansion Vancouver Grizzlies of the NBA began play in 1995. However, in 2001 the team moved to Memphis, Tennessee and was renamed as the Memphis Grizzlies.)	Canucks	3	Whitecaps FC	Lions
Cleveland	United States	23	2,642,000	3	Browns (Note: Five other NFL teams have played in the Cleveland area: the Tigers (1920-1922; the team suspended operations and could not pay an annual guarantee), the Indians/Bulldogs (1923-1927, when the team moved to Detroit and became the Wolverines), the Indians (1931), the Rams (1937-1946; moved to Los Angeles) and the original Browns (1950-1995). The original Browns' owner Art Modell had planned to move the Browns to Baltimore but was threatened by legal action from both Cleveland and Browns fans; the dispute was resolved when Modell was given an expansion franchise in Baltimore using existing Browns personnel, while the city of Cleveland was allowed to retain the team's intellectual property for a new Browns franchise.)	Guardians (Note: 2 former baseball teams played in the National League: the Blues (1879-1884, when the teams was folded into the Brooklyn Grays) and the Spiders (1889-1899, when the team was contracted from the league). The Guardians were known as the Indians from 1914 to 2021.)	Cavaliers (Note: The Cleveland Rebels played in the inaugural season of the NBA's predecessor, the BAA, before dissolving.)	(Note: The California Golden Seals of the NHL relocated to Cleveland for the 1976–77 season and were renamed the Barons. However, the team was merged into the Minnesota North Stars following the 1977–78 season.)	3	—	—
Salt Lake City	United States	24	2,455,000	2	—	—	Jazz	Mammoth	3	Real Salt Lake	—
Las Vegas	United States	25	2,260,000	2	Raiders		(Note: Las Vegas has never had an NBA team, but the Utah Jazz played 11 home games in Las Vegas during the 1983-1984 season.)	Golden Knights	2	—	(Note: The Las Vegas Posse was a CFL expansion franchise that existed for only the 1994 season.)
Charlotte	United States	26	2,214,000	2	Panthers	—	Hornets (Note: The original Hornets franchise played in the NBA from 1988 to 2002, before moving to New Orleans. The current Hornets were established in 2004 as the Charlotte Bobcats, but re-assumed the Hornets name in 2014, after the New Orleans Hornets renamed themselves the Pelicans and transferred their records and statistics from their time as the original Hornets to the current Charlotte franchise.)	—	3	Charlotte FC	—
St. Louis	United States	27	2,193,000	2	(Note: St. Louis has hosted four NFL teams: the St. Louis All-Stars in 1923, the St. Louis Gunners who played the last 3 games of the 1934 season, the St. Louis Cardinals who played from 1960 to 1988 before moving to Phoenix, Arizona, and the St. Louis Rams who played from 1995 to 2015, before moving back to Los Angeles.)	Cardinals (Note: Before the Cardinals joined the National League from the defunct American Association in 1892, St. Louis had been home to two NL teams: the St. Louis Brown Stockings, which dissolved in 1877, and the Maroons, which joined the NL in 1885 from the defunct Union Association and moved to Indianapolis in 1887. In addition, the Browns played in the American League from 1901 until it moved to Baltimore in 1954.)	(Note: St. Louis has been home to two NBA teams: the St. Louis Hawks, who moved to Atlanta and became the Atlanta Hawks in 1968 and the St. Louis Bombers, who folded in 1950. St. Louis was also home to the American Basketball Association (ABA)'s Spirits of St. Louis before the ABA–NBA merger in 1976.)	Blues (Note: The Eagles, a relocation of the Ottawa Senators, played in the NHL for the 1934-1935 season; after a request to suspend operations for the following season was rejected by the NHL, the team was disbanded and its players dispersed among the league's remaining teams.)	3	St. Louis City SC	—
San Antonio	United States	28	2,101,000	1	(Note: San Antonio served as a temporary home for the New Orleans Saints during the 2005 NFL season due to the effects of Hurricane Katrina.)	—	Spurs	—	1	—	(Note: The San Antonio Texans were a CFL team that played in 1995 CFL season, having relocated from Sacramento, California, where the team had been called the Sacramento Gold Miners, but folded after a single season.)
Portland	United States	29	2,076,000	1	—	—	Trail Blazers	—	2	Timbers	—
Sacramento	United States	30	1,970,000	2	—	Athletics	Kings	—	2	—	(Note: The Sacramento Gold Miners were a CFL expansion team based in Sacramento, California for two years before relocating to become the San Antonio Texans.)
Austin	United States	31	1,957,000	0	—	—	—	—	1	Austin FC	—
Kansas City	United States	32	1,788,000	2	Chiefs (Note: Kansas City was home to the Kansas City Blues/Cowboys from 1924 to 1926.)	Royals (Note: Kansas City was home to the National League Kansas City Cowboys in 1886 and the American League's Kansas City Athletics from 1955 until it moved to Oakland in 1968.)	(Note: Kansas City had an NBA team from 1972 to 1985, having moved from Cincinnati, Ohio where they were known as the Cincinnati Royals. The team was known as the Kansas City-Omaha Kings from 1972 to 1975 because it played home games in both Kansas City, Missouri and Omaha, Nebraska. Starting with the 1975–76 season, the team played exclusively in Kansas City and was known as the Kansas City Kings. The Kings moved to Sacramento, California in 1985.)	(Note: In 1974 the Kansas City Scouts were granted an NHL expansion franchise. However, the franchise became the Colorado Rockies in 1976.)	3	Sporting Kansas City	—
Indianapolis	United States	33	1,757,000	2	Colts	(Note: The Indianapolis Blues played in the National League for the 1878 season, while the St. Louis Maroons moved to Indianapolis and played as the Hoosiers from 1887 until the team dissolved in 1889. A second Indianapolis Hoosiers team took the field in 1914, and won the championship of the new Federal League, which is officially considered to be a major league. The franchise moved to Newark, New Jersey for the league's second and final season.)	Pacers (Note: Before the Pacers joined the NBA in 1976 as a result of the ABA–NBA merger, two NBA teams had played in Indianapolis: the Indianapolis Jets of the NBL joined the BAA (the NBA's immediate predecessor) in 1948, but dissolved the following year when the NBL merged with the BAA, in favor of the NBL's Indianapolis Olympians. The Olympians would disband in 1953.)	—	2	—	—
Cincinnati	United States	34	1,712,000	2	Bengals (Note: Cincinnati was home to the NFL (then APFA) Cincinnati Celts in 1921 and later the Cincinnati Reds from 1933 to 1934.)	Reds (Note: The Red Stockings, informally known as the "Reds", played in the National League from 1876 until it was expelled in 1880 for violating league rules. The current Reds joined the NL in 1890 from the AA.)	(Note: The Cincinnati Royals were an NBA team founded as the Rochester Royals in 1948, before moving to Cincinnati in 1957. Upon moving to Kansas City, Missouri in 1972, the team was renamed as the Kansas City-Omaha Kings.)	—	3	FC Cincinnati	—
Pittsburgh	United States	35	1,700,000	3	Steelers	Pirates	(Note: Pittsburgh had one of the founding members of what became the NBA: the Pittsburgh Ironmen. However, they only played a single season (1946–47) before folding.)	Penguins (Note: The Pirates played in the NHL from 1925 until the team moved to Philadelphia in 1930 due to the effects of the Great Depression.)	3	—	—
Calgary	Canada	36	1,593,000	1	—	—	—	Flames	2	—	Stampeders
Raleigh	United States	37	1,585,000	1	—	—	—	Hurricanes	1	—	—
Columbus	United States	38	1,583,000	1	(Note: Columbus had an NFL team called the Columbus Panhandles that played from 1920 to 1926.)	—	—	Blue Jackets	2	Crew	—
Edmonton	Canada	40	1,333,000	1	—	—	—	Oilers	2	—	Elks (Note: The Elks were known as the Eskimos from 1949 until 2020, then temporarily calling themselves the Edmonton Football Team before adopting the Elks name in 2021.)
Jacksonville	United States	41	1,325,000	1	Jaguars	—	—	—	1	—	—
Milwaukee	United States	42	1,284,000	2	(Note: Milwaukee had an NFL franchise from 1922 to 1926 called the Milwaukee Badgers. A few years after the Badgers folded, the Green Bay Packers would play a portion of their home schedule in Milwaukee on a regular basis from 1933 until 1994.)	Brewers (Note: Prior to the Brewers, three MLB teams have played in Milwaukee. In the National League, the Grays played in the 1878 NL season, while the Braves played in the city from 1953 until it moved to Atlanta in 1965. The original Brewers played in the American League's inaugural season in 1901 before moving to St. Louis and becoming the Browns.)	Bucks (Note: Milwaukee was home to the Milwaukee Hawks from 1951 to 1955.)	—	2	—	—
Nashville	United States	43	1,195,000	2	Titans	—	—	Predators	3	Nashville SC	—
Ottawa	Canada	44	1,187,000	1	—	—	—	Senators (Note: An earlier Ottawa Senators played in the NHL from 1917 to 1934.)	2	—	Redblacks (Note: Two CFL teams have previously played in the Ottawa area: The Rough Riders, who existed from 1876 to 1996 and the Renegades, who played from 2002 to 2006.)
Memphis	United States	47	1,024,000	1	(Note: The NFL's Houston Oilers relocated to Memphis for one season (as the Tennessee Oilers) in 1997 before moving to Nashville to become the Tennessee Titans.)	—	Grizzlies	—	1	—	(Note: The Memphis Mad Dogs were a CFL expansion franchise that existed for only the 1995 season.)
Oklahoma City	United States	48	1,007,000	1	—	—	Thunder (Note: Oklahoma City served as a temporary home for the New Orleans Hornets for two seasons due to the effects of Hurricane Katrina.)	—	1	—	—
Buffalo	United States	51	950,000	2	Bills (Note: Before the Bills joined the NFL as a result of the AFL-NFL merger in 1970, two other NFL teams played in the Buffalo area. The All-Americans/Bisons/Rangers/Bisons played in the city under several different owners until 1929 (not playing the 1928 season), while the Tonawanda Kardex Lumbermen played in Tonawanda in the 1921 season, but disbanded after a lopsided loss in their sole NFL game. From the 2008 to 2013 seasons, the Bills hosted one of their regular season games and a number of preseason games at Toronto's Rogers Centre as part of the Bills Toronto Series.)	(Note: The Bisons played in the National League from 1879 until it left the league in 1885; the Bisons have played in the minor leagues in one form or another since. In addition, the Toronto Blue Jays played a majority of their home games in Buffalo during the 2020 season due to COVID-19-related issues preventing the Blue Jays from playing in Toronto.)	(Note: The Buffalo Braves were an NBA team that moved to San Diego, California in 1978 to become the San Diego Clippers.)	Sabres	2	—	—
New Orleans	United States	52	920,000	2	Saints	—	Pelicans (Note: The New Orleans Jazz played in the NBA in 1974 before moving to Salt Lake City in 1979. The Pelicans themselves (not related to the Jazz) were formerly a relocation of the Charlotte Hornets, but in 2013 the renamed Pelicans transferred its records and statistics from their time in Charlotte to the Charlotte Bobcats, who were about to reassume the Hornets name. The Pelicans are now considered an expansion team starting play in 2002 as the New Orleans Hornets, then renaming themselves as the Pelicans in 2013.)	—	2	—	—
Winnipeg	Canada	55	858,000	1	—	—	—	Jets (Note: The original Winnipeg Jets relocated to become the Phoenix Coyotes (known as the Arizona Coyotes since 2014) in 1996. The current Winnipeg Jets were established by the relocation of the Atlanta Thrashers in 2011.)	2	—	Blue Bombers
Green Bay	United States	—	329,375 (Note: Metro population)	1	Packers	—	—	—	1	—	—
Regina	Canada	—	255,395	0	—	—	—	—	1	—	Roughriders
Totals	—	—	–	124	32	30	30	32	163	30	9

== Teams by state/province/district ==
Big 6 sports teams

State Province District	Pop. rank (Note: U.S. figures are from the 2020 United States census and Canadian figures are from the 2021 Canadian census.)	Big four teams (B4)	NFL	MLB	NBA	NHL	Big six teams (B6)	MLS	CFL
(United States) California	1	15	Chargers; Rams; 49ers	Angels; Dodgers; Athletics; Padres; Giants	Warriors; Clippers; Lakers; Kings	Ducks; Kings; Sharks	19	Galaxy; Los Angeles FC; Earthquakes; San Diego FC	—
(United States) Texas	2	8	Cowboys; Texans	Astros; Rangers	Mavericks; Rockets; Spurs	Stars	11	Dynamo; FC Dallas; Austin FC	—
(United States) Florida	3	9	Jaguars; Dolphins; Buccaneers	Marlins; Rays	Heat; Magic	Panthers; Lightning	11	Orlando City SC; Inter Miami CF	—
(United States) New York	4	8	Bills (Note: The NFL's Buffalo Bills held one of the team's regular season games each year and a number of preseason games at Toronto's Rogers Centre from 2008 to 2013 as part of the Bills Toronto Series.) (Note: The New York Giants and Jets both play their home games at MetLife Stadium in East Rutherford, New Jersey.)	Mets; Yankees	Nets; Knicks	Sabres; Islanders; Rangers	9	New York City FC (Note: The New York Red Bulls play their home games at Sports Illustrated Stadium in Harrison, New Jersey.)	—
(Canada) Ontario	5	4	—	Blue Jays	Raptors	Senators; Maple Leafs	8	Toronto FC	Tiger-Cats; Redblacks; Argonauts
(United States) Pennsylvania	6	7	Eagles; Steelers	Phillies; Pirates	76ers	Flyers; Penguins	8	Union	—
(United States) Illinois	7	5	Bears	Cubs; White Sox	Bulls	Blackhawks	6	Fire	—
(United States) Ohio	8	6	Bengals; Browns	Reds; Guardians	Cavaliers	Blue Jackets	8	Crew; FC Cincinnati	—
(United States) Georgia	9	3	Falcons	Braves	Hawks	—	4	United FC	—
(United States) North Carolina	10	3	Panthers	—	Hornets	Hurricanes	4	Charlotte FC	—
(United States) Michigan	11	4	Lions	Tigers	Pistons	Red Wings	4	—	—
(United States) New Jersey	12	3	Giants; Jets	—	—	Devils	4	Red Bulls	—
(Canada) Quebec	14	1	—	—	—	Canadiens	3	CF Montréal	Alouettes
(United States) Washington	15	3	Seahawks	Mariners	—	Kraken	4	Sounders FC	—
(United States) Arizona	16	3	Cardinals	Diamondbacks	Suns	—	3	—	—
(United States) Massachusetts	17	4	Patriots	Red Sox	Celtics	Bruins	5	Revolution	—
(United States) Tennessee	18	3	Titans	—	Grizzlies	Predators	4	Nashville SC	—
(United States) Indiana	19	2	Colts	—	Pacers	—	2	—	—
(United States) Maryland	20	3	Ravens; Commanders (Note: The Washington Commanders play their home games at Northwest Stadium in Landover, Maryland.)	Orioles	—	—	3	—	—
(United States) Missouri	21	4	Chiefs	Royals; Cardinals	—	Blues	5	St. Louis City SC	—
(United States) Wisconsin	22	3	Packers	Brewers	Bucks	—	3	—	—
(United States) Colorado	23	4	Broncos	Rockies	Nuggets	Avalanche	5	Rapids	—
(United States) Minnesota	24	4	Vikings	Twins	Timberwolves	Wild	5	United FC	—
(Canada) British Columbia	27	1	—	—	—	Canucks	3	Whitecaps FC	Lions
(United States) Louisiana	28	2	Saints	—	Pelicans	—	2	—	—
(Canada) Alberta	30	2	—	—	—	Flames; Oilers	4	—	Stampeders; Elks
(United States) Oregon	31	1	—	—	Trail Blazers	—	2	Timbers	—
(United States) Oklahoma	32	1	—	—	Thunder	—	1	—	—
(United States) Utah	34	2	—	—	Jazz	Mammoth	3	Real Salt Lake	—
(United States) Nevada	36	2	Raiders	— (Note: The Oakland Athletics are scheduled to move to Las Vegas in 2028, after three seasons playing in West Sacramento, California.)	—	Golden Knights	2	—	—
(United States) Kansas	39	0	—	—	—	—	1	Sporting Kansas City (Note: Sporting Kansas City play their home games at Sporting Park in Kansas City, Kansas.)	—
(Canada) Manitoba	47	1	—	—	—	Jets	2	—	Blue Bombers
(Canada) Saskatchewan	48	0	—	—	—	—	1	—	Roughriders
(United States) Washington, D.C.	–	3	—	Nationals	Wizards	Capitals	4	D.C. United	—
34 states/ provinces/ districts		124	32	30	30	32	163	30	9

== See also ==
- U.S. cities with teams from four major league sports
- List of auto racing tracks in the United States by city
- List of professional golf tournaments in the United States by city
- List of professional sports teams in the United States and Canada
- Major professional sports leagues in the United States and Canada
- Major professional sports teams in the United States and Canada
- List of top level minor league sports teams in the United States by city
- List of soccer clubs in the United States by city
