= List of top-level minor league sports teams in the United States by metropolitan area =

This article features a listing of the top-level professional minor league sports teams based in the United States that are typically the second tier of professional sports under the major professional leagues. The minor leagues listed below also include teams outside the United States, with seven in Canada (one in the NBA G League and six in the American Hockey League) and one in Mexico (NBA G League).

Triple-A minor league baseball has two leagues, the International League and Pacific Coast League, both affiliated with Major League Baseball. Basketball and ice hockey each have one affiliated minor league, the NBA G League and American Hockey League, respectively. The USL Championship (USLC) is a Division II league below Major League Soccer as designated by the United States Soccer Federation that governs the various soccer leagues, although some MLS teams are affiliated with clubs from outside the second tier for development purposes. However, most MLS clubs now field their reserve sides in MLS Next Pro, a third-level league that launched in 2022, and the only MLS clubs that are not fielding a Next Pro side in 2025 are CF Montréal, D.C. United, and San Diego FC. There are no affiliated minor leagues for American or Canadian football as most of its recruiting is done through college football, and minor football leagues do not historically have long lifespans before folding,. Currently there is one existing high level spring league: the United Football League, formed from the merger of the USFL and the XFL.

Teams that will join a league for a future season are indicated in italics.

Rank (Note: As of 2020)	Metropolitan area	Triple-A Baseball	NBA G League	American Hockey League	USL Championship	United Football League
1	New York		Long Island Nets; Westchester Knicks		Brooklyn FC	
2	Los Angeles		South Bay Lakers		Orange County SC	
3	Chicago		Windy City Bulls	Chicago Wolves		
4	Dallas–Fort Worth, Texas		Texas Legends			Arlington Renegades
5	Houston, Texas	Sugar Land Space Cowboys (PCL)				Houston Roughnecks
6	Washington, D.C.		Capital City Go-Go		Loudoun United FC	DC Defenders
7	Philadelphia, Pennsylvania		Delaware Blue Coats			
8	Miami, Florida				Miami FC; USL Palm Beach	
9	Atlanta, Georgia	Gwinnett Stripers (IL)	College Park Skyhawks			
11	Phoenix, Arizona		Valley Suns		Phoenix Rising FC	
12	San Francisco-Oakland-Berkeley				Oakland Roots SC	
13	Inland Empire			Ontario Reign; Coachella Valley Firebirds		
14	Detroit, Michigan		Motor City Cruise		Detroit City FC	Michigan Panthers
15	Seattle, Washington	Tacoma Rainiers (PCL)				
16	Minneapolis–Saint Paul	St. Paul Saints (IL)				
17	San Diego, California		San Diego Clippers	San Diego Gulls		
18	Tampa Bay, Florida				Tampa Bay Rowdies	
21	St. Louis, Missouri					St. Louis BattleHawks
22	Orlando, Florida		Osceola Magic			
23	Charlotte, North Carolina	Charlotte Knights (IL)		Charlotte Checkers		
24	San Antonio, Texas				San Antonio FC	San Antonio Brahmas
25	Portland, Oregon		Rip City Remix			
26	Sacramento, California	Sacramento River Cats (PCL)			Sacramento Republic FC	
27	Pittsburgh, Pennsylvania				Pittsburgh Riverhounds SC	
28	Austin, Texas	Round Rock Express (PCL)	Austin Spurs	Texas Stars		
29	Las Vegas, Nevada	Las Vegas Aviators (PCL)		Henderson Silver Knights	Las Vegas Lights FC	
32	Columbus, Ohio	Columbus Clippers (IL)				
33	Indianapolis, Indiana	Indianapolis Indians (IL)	Noblesville Boom		Indy Eleven	
34	Cleveland, Ohio		Cleveland Charge	Cleveland Monsters		
35	San Jose-Sunnyvale-Santa Clara, California			San Jose Barracuda		
36	Nashville, Tennessee	Nashville Sounds (IL)				
37	Virginia Beach-Norfolk, Virginia	Norfolk Tides (IL)				
38	Providence, Rhode Island			Providence Bruins	Rhode Island FC	
39	Jacksonville, Florida	Jacksonville Jumbo Shrimp (IL)			Sporting Club Jacksonville	
40	Milwaukee, Wisconsin			Milwaukee Admirals	Milwaukee Pro Soccer	
41	Oklahoma City	Oklahoma City Comets (PCL)	Oklahoma City Blue		OKC Energy FC	
42	Raleigh-Durham, North Carolina	Durham Bulls (IL)			North Carolina FC	
43	Memphis, Tennessee	Memphis Redbirds (IL)	Memphis Hustle		Memphis 901 FC	Memphis Showboats
45	Louisville, Kentucky	Louisville Bats (IL)			Louisville City FC	
46	New Orleans, Louisiana				USL New Orleans	
47	Salt Lake City, Utah	Salt Lake Bees (PCL)	Salt Lake City Stars			
48	Hartford, Connecticut			Hartford Wolf Pack	Hartford Athletic	
49	Buffalo, New York	Buffalo Bisons (IL)			Buffalo Pro Soccer	
50	Birmingham, Alabama		Birmingham Squadron		Birmingham Legion FC	Birmingham Stallions
51	Rochester, New York	Rochester Red Wings (IL)		Rochester Americans		
52	Grand Rapids, Michigan		Grand Rapids Gold	Grand Rapids Griffins		
53	Tucson, Arizona			Tucson Roadrunners		
55	Tulsa, Oklahoma				FC Tulsa	
57	Worcester, Massachusetts	Worcester Red Sox (IL)				
58	Omaha, Nebraska	Omaha Storm Chasers (IL)				
59	Bridgeport, Connecticut			Bridgeport Islanders		
61	Albuquerque, New Mexico	Albuquerque Isotopes (PCL)			New Mexico United	
62	Bakersfield, California			Bakersfield Condors		
65	McAllen, Texas		Rio Grande Valley Vipers			
67	El Paso, Texas	El Paso Chihuahuas (PCL)			El Paso Locomotive FC	
69	Lehigh Valley	Lehigh Valley IronPigs (IL)		Lehigh Valley Phantoms		
74	Charleston, South Carolina				Charleston Battery	
75	Stockton–Lodi, California		Stockton Kings			
76	Greensboro, North Carolina		Greensboro Swarm			
79	Colorado Springs				Colorado Springs Switchbacks FC	
82	Des Moines, Iowa	Iowa Cubs (IL)	Iowa Wolves	Iowa Wild	USL Pro Iowa	
84	Springfield, Massachusetts			Springfield Thunderbirds		
91	Syracuse, New York	Syracuse Mets (IL)		Syracuse Crunch		
94	Toledo, Ohio	Toledo Mud Hens (IL)				
98	Harrisburg, Pennsylvania			Hershey Bears		
100	Scranton/Wilkes-Barre, Pennsylvania	Scranton/Wilkes-Barre Highlanders (IL)		Wilkes-Barre/Scranton Penguins		
104	Portland, Maine		Maine Celtics			
105	Northwest Arkansas				Ozark United FC	
109	Lexington, Kentucky				Lexington SC	
112	Reno, Nevada	Reno Aces (PCL)				
124	Salinas, California				Monterey Bay FC	
151	Fort Collins–Loveland, Colorado			Colorado Eagles		
154	Rockford, Illinois			Rockford IceHogs		
169	Utica, New York			Utica Comets		
177	Sioux Falls, South Dakota		Sioux Falls Skyforce			
182	Santa Cruz, California		Santa Cruz Warriors			
250	Oshkosh, Wisconsin		Wisconsin Herd			

== See also ==
- List of developmental and minor sports leagues
- List of American and Canadian cities by number of major professional sports franchises
- List of professional sports teams in the United States and Canada
- List of auto racing tracks in the United States by city
- List of professional golf tournaments in the United States by city
- List of soccer clubs in the United States by city
