= USL New Orleans =

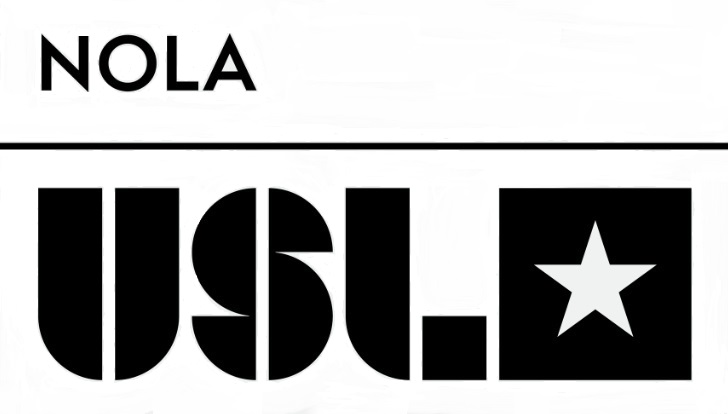
- Full name: USL New Orleans
- Founded: July 14, 2022; 3 years ago
- Ground: TBD
- Owner: Warren Smith and Jamie Guin
- League: USL Championship

USL New Orleans is a planned American professional soccer team based in New Orleans, Louisiana. Founded in 2022, the team planned to make its debut in the USL Championship in 2025. These plans were later postponed.

== History ==
On July 14, 2022, the USL awarded an expansion team to the city of New Orleans, Louisiana. The ownership group consists of Warren Smith, who was previously involved with the launch of the Sacramento Republic FC, and former MLS and New Orleans Pelicans team executive Jamie Guin. The team had announced plans to join the USL Championship for the 2025 season, but did not confirm their stadium site or other details. A potential soccer-specific stadium in the River District near the Ernest N. Morial Convention Center was proposed by a private developer, while other venues had been in discussions with the ownership group.

As of 2025, the team has not announced when they would begin play, their stadium, or their permanent name. The team is no longer listed on the USL Championship's website, and the team's social media pages have not been updated since 2023.
