= Social conscience =

Sense of responsibility or concern for the problems of society

A social conscience is "a sense of responsibility or concern for the problems and injustices of society".

While our conscience is related to moral conduct in our day-to-day lives with respect to individuals, social conscience is concerned with the broader institutions of society and the gap that we may perceive between the sort of society that should exist and the one that does exist.

The term "social conscience" has been used in conjunction with everything from investing, to art, antiques, and politics.

== Development ==
The social conscience of an individual can be related to George Herbert Mead's generalized other. Instead of having an internalized expectation of what society expects of them, the individual possesses certain expectations of society. These expectations are generally tied to their moral values. Once the individual is impacted by an occurrence that defies or goes against what they consider to be right and wrong, they develop a social conscience towards that issue. The next step is deciding whether to act on that urge. If the individual chooses to act, they may choose to demonstrate their concern for that issue in a variety of ways, such as fighting back, protesting, or in several other forms of rebelling against that realistic form of society.

== Modern ties ==
=== Protests ===
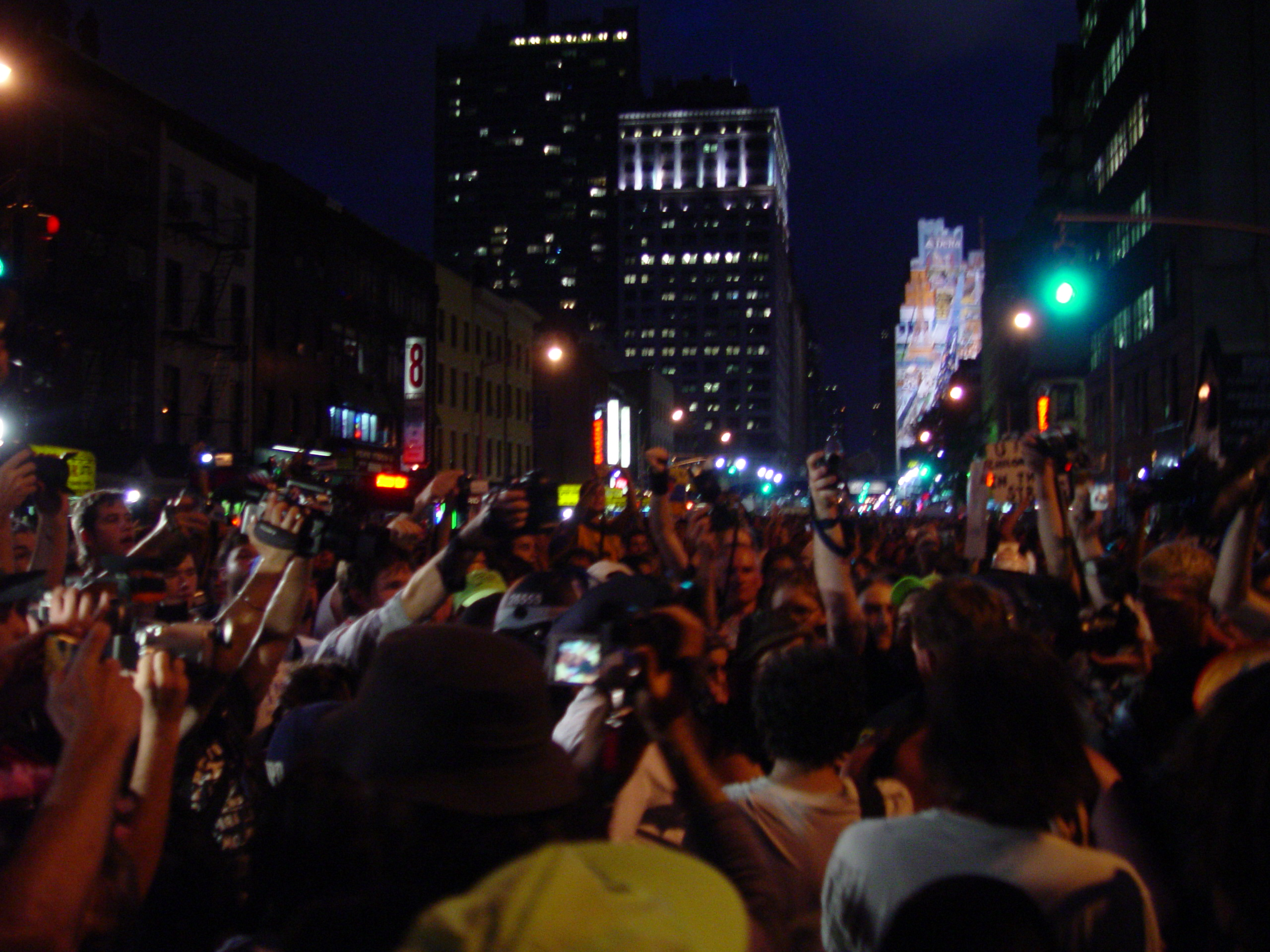
Protest against the Republican National Convention of 2004 in New York

The act of following one's social conscience is to take empathy and direct it in support of a cause. Protesting is a popular way of demonstrating one's ideologies towards a particular subject in the hopes of alternating the outcome to fit what is perceived to be the sort of society that should exist.

Protests can arise from the frustrations and grievances of someone or multiple people in response to a perceived problem that does not coincide with their ideal society.

According to social psychologist Albert Bandura, our expectation to be able to change the outcome of something by protesting is known as self-efficacy. People tend to believe that problems can be solved with a group effort, which is why protesting is seen as a popular choice.

Protesting is not limited to being a group effort and can be undertaken by a single individual following their social conscience.

These protests are usually targeted at groups with a higher status of power in the hopes of alternating the flow of power to another group that is perceived to be morally correct. This selection of groups is not limited to the powerless versus the powerful. The powerful can also protest against the powerless, and members of both groups can intermingle with one another to protest against another group.

=== Business ===
Social conscience is tied to business through the disagreeableness or agreeableness that might be imposed on someone by the actions of a corporate entity. These differing opinions may lead one, or both parties, to develop a social conscience or set of ideals that dictates what they consider to be morally correct.

The ethical concerns behind the financial decisions or investments of a business can trigger a sense of responsibility towards those decisions. If a corporation possesses a disagreeable aspect in the way it functions, the social conscience of the human mind notices these injustices and may develop a set of responsibilities towards these actions.

The development of one's social conscience is not limited to disagreeing with the ideals of a broader institution. Many businesses center their function around combating a set of issues or injustices and feel an obligation to help their community. People can develop their social conscience around these ideals and also feel an urge to act against these issues.

It has become possible to track many of the corporate ideals that companies put into effect. In Japan, companies are expected by the government to report what influences their environmental policies may have on citizens, on a yearly basis. This transparency allows citizens to develop their social conscience in response to the decisions of these broader institutions.

== Historical accounts of social conscience ==
=== Early Victorian era ===
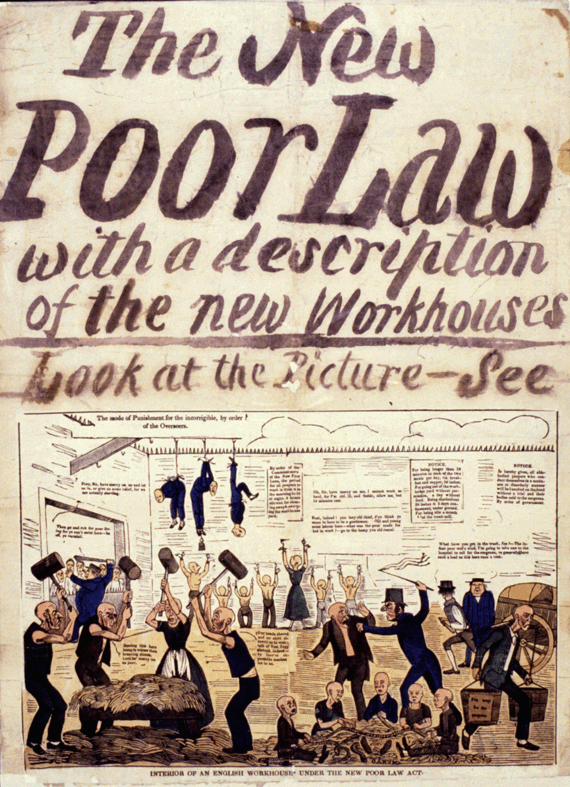
Political cartoon depicting the harsh conditions of a workhouse after the passing of the Poor Law Amendment Act 1834.

Early Victorians were notable initiators of social conscience in a society where industrialization took a widespread approach. To combat this increase of industrialization, they formed a decentralized government. This new ideal of diverting power to the people was initially inefficient, with a group of people being in charge whose experience was lacking, or whose ideals were not those of the citizens. Despite the initial failures of this system, it serves as an early example of social conscience. It was the initiator for a new movement to combat the unfair conditions that widespread industrialization had brought. The organizational advancements needed to create this new platform of government was a large step in a direction that only came to light when the people of this era began to feel an obligation to solve those injustices due to their social conscience.

Moral arguments have propelled many movements seeking reform. The morals of two men in different working-class positions could have differed, but both could have demonstrated support for or rejection of the Poor Law Amendment Act 1834. This is a result of both men seeking some type of reform, not believing that the current state of the law could allow for their ideal image of a working class to be fulfilled. The social conscience of supporters and adversaries of this amendment sought reform as a solution to what they felt were injustices.

=== Mid- and Post-World War II ===
The economic and social changes brought about by the Second World War led to several reform movements, which manifested in the form of strikes, peaceful protests, and other awareness-raising campaigns.

One such movement was initiated by a group of young men who shined a spotlight on the inhumane conditions of mental hospitals and other facilities that treated those with intellectual disabilities. Patients were subjected to forms of brutality and abuse, which was observed by this group of volunteers at the institute. Their ability to expose several public institutions stemmed from their social conscience acting upon witnessing these acts, which were considered by them to be immoral. Their cause was supported by prominent Americans such as Eleanor Roosevelt. Their concern with the gap between an ideal society and reality led to an attempt at reform.

== The social conscience of art ==
=== Literature ===
Literature is a common method used to convey one's emotions and has been a popular platform for conveying ethical concerns. These concerns usually stem from a person's social conscience towards a particular issue or various issues that they feel should be addressed.

Forms of literature, like poems with a social conscience inscribed into them, have several layers and dimensions that represent deeper meanings to the reader. The reader becomes immersed in these meanings, understanding the social conscience of the writer who is conveying an opinion through poetry. The authors of these poems format their writing to highlight the differences between an ethically ideal world and reality, attempting to instigate the social conscience of the reader.

Carolyn Forché, an award-winning American author, is an example of someone using their social conscience in literature. She, along with her colleague Duncan Wu, have compiled a volume of poetry focused on the writings of poets attacking humanitarian issues such as slavery and war.

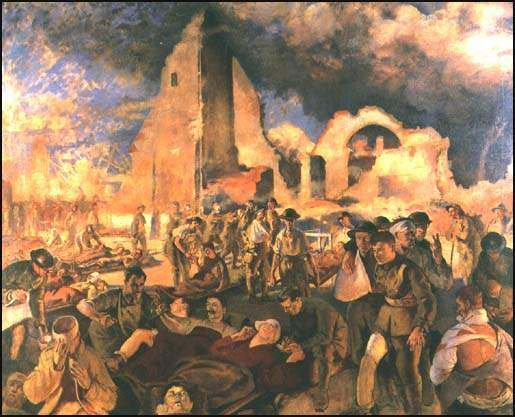
A painting depicting the struggles of war in a French advanced dressing station during World War I.

=== Visual art ===
Forms of visual art, such as portraits or paintings, possess the ability to bring out an emotional response in the viewer. By using this imagery, artists can instigate a response in the viewer that allows them to develop a set of responsibilities or set of concerns for a cause.

Portraits, paintings, pottery, and many other forms of creation can act as reminders of events that have unfolded, specifically noting the emotional impacts of those events. Historical pieces of art can serve as a reference for the morality of the viewer, allowing them to adjust their social conscience in response to what has and hasn't worked in the past.

=== Music ===
Music can be used as an auditory form of conveying one's social conscience on a matter to others. Several genres of music were created as a response to the social issues of the time, such as rap, which tells stories and delivers ideals. Music can also be used to rebel against societal norms by delivering currently non-accepted ideologies.
