= Parnassus (Northern Essex Community College) =

American literary magazine

Parnassus Literary Arts Magazine
- 2012 Parnassus
- Categories: Literary Arts Magazine
- Frequency: Annually
- Founded: 1965; 60 years ago
- Country: USA
- Based in: Haverhill, Massachusetts
- Language: English
- Website: parnassuslitmag.com

Parnassus is the annual literary arts magazine of Northern Essex Community College in Haverhill, Massachusetts. The magazine has been in publication since 1965, and was a bi-annual publication until 2008, when it switched to a yearly publication, with issues released at the end of each year's spring semester in May. Parnassus is a free publication, and copies can be found at the Haverhill campus of NECC while available.

Parnassus is edited by students of NECC, and its contents feature student work in the areas of fiction, poetry, creative non fiction, photography, and other assorted artwork. The magazine's advisor has been professor Patrick Lochelt since 2006. The magazine is a part of the Liberal Arts department at NECC, and membership in the editorial staff is open to all current NECC students in either the fall or spring semesters each year.

== Guest authors and artists ==
Since 2008, Parnassus has regularly featured work from notable New England-area guest authors and artists:

- 2008: Steve Almond's short story "Sweet Jesus"
- 2009: Andre Dubus III's short story "Tracks and Ties"
- 2010: NECC Poets (a group of alumni and faculty poets from NECC)
- 2011: Stephen King's short story "Night Surf"
- 2012: Gregory Maguire's short story "In That Country" (First publication)
- 2014: Junot Diaz' short story "Homecoming, With Turtle"
- 2016: Diannely Antigua - poetry compilation
- 2017: Michael Cormier's short story "The Worshipping Tree"
- 2018: Lance Hidy - artwork compilation
- 2019: Dale Rogers Jr. - sculpture compilation

== Recent issues and awards ==
Year	Association	Awards and nominations	Ref
2008	Community College Humanities Association	Second Place, Eastern Division	
2008	American Scholastic Press Association	First Place with Merit	
2008	American Scholastic Press Association	Best Gallery	
2009	Community College Humanities Association	First Place, Eastern Division	
2009	Associated Collegiate Press	Finalist, Pacemaker Awards	
2009	American Scholastic Press Association	First Place with Merit	
2009	National Council for Marketing and Public Relations	Silver Medal Award	
2010	Community College Humanities Association	First Place, Eastern Division	
2010	Columbia Scholastic Press Association	Silver Crown Award	
2010	American Scholastic Press Association	First Place	
2010	American Scholastic Press Association	Best Page Design	
2011	Associated Collegiate Press	Best Two-Year College Literary Magazine, Pacemaker Awards	
2011	Columbia Scholastic Press Association	Gold Crown award	
2011	Community College Humanities Association	First Place, Eastern Division	
2011	American Scholastic Press Association	First Place	
2011	National Council for Marketing and Public Relations		
2012	Community College Humanities Association	First Place, Eastern Division	
2012	American Scholastic Press Association	First Place	
2013	Associated Collegiate Press	Finalist, Pacemaker Awards	
2013	Community College Humanities Association	First Place, Eastern Division	
2013	American Scholastic Press Association	First Place	
2016	Community College Humanities Association	Second Place, Eastern Division	
2016	American Scholastic Press Association	First Place	
2017	Associated Collegiate Press	Finalist, Pacemaker Awards	
2017	American Scholastic Press Association	First Place	
2017	National Council for Marketing and Public Relations	District One Medallion Award	
2018	Associated Collegiate Press	Best Two-Year College Literary Magazine, Pacemaker Awards	
2018	American Scholastic Press Association	Second Place	
