= Essex County College =

Community college in New Jersey, US

Coordinates: 40.7387°N 74.1784°W

- Type: Public community college
- Established: 1966
- Academic affiliations: Space-grant
- Location: Newark, New Jersey, U.S.
- Colors: Green & yellow
- Nickname: Wolverines
- Website: www.essex.edu

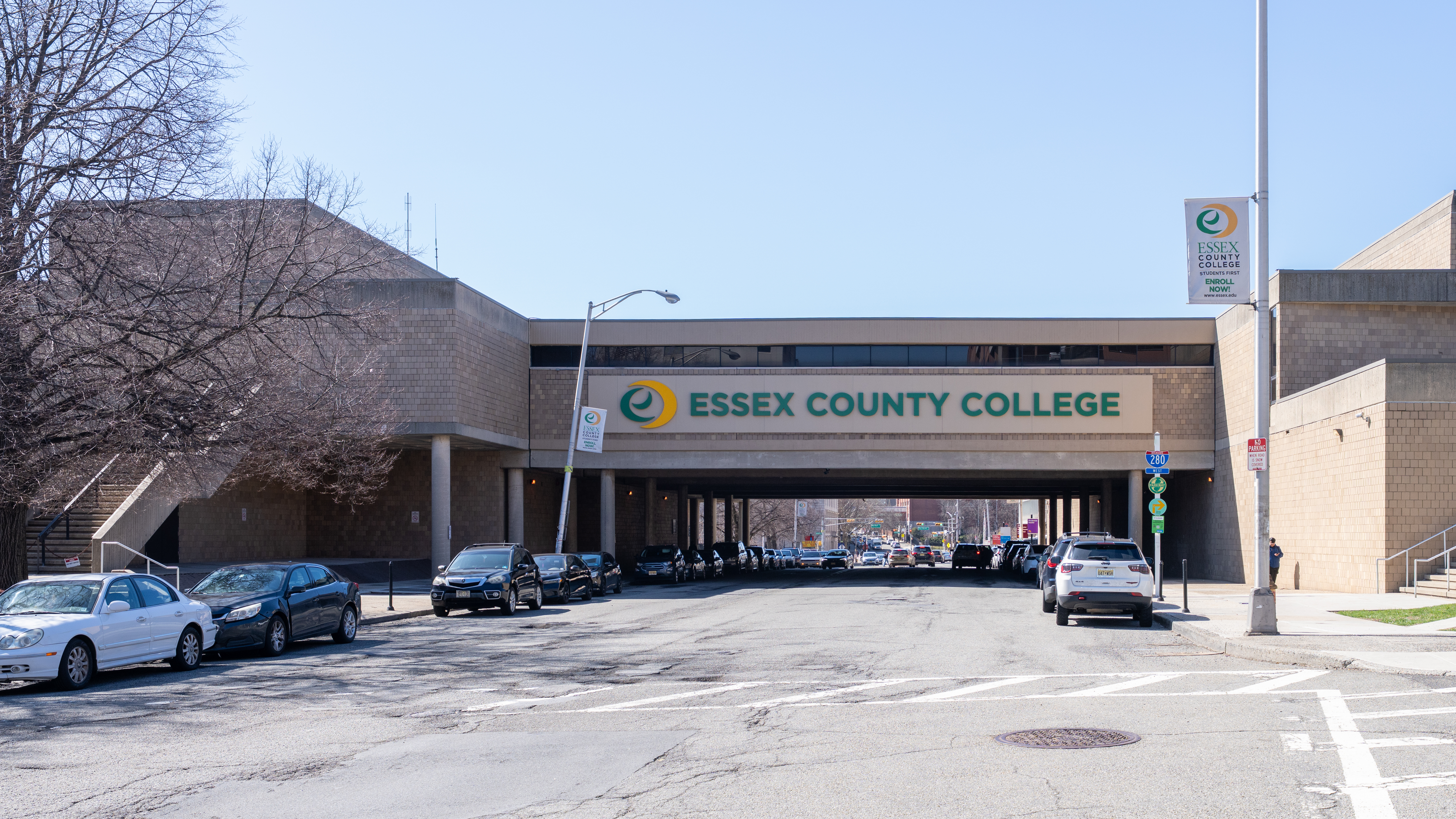
Newark Campus view from Dr. Martin Luther King, Jr. Blvd.

Essex County College (ECC) is a public community college in Essex County, New Jersey, United States.

== History ==
In August 1966, the Essex County Board of Freeholders approved the creation of Essex County College and in September 1968, more than a year after the Newark riots, the college opened its doors to 3,400 students at 31 Clinton Street, Newark, New Jersey.

In early 1970, after the college celebrated its first commencement, graduating 214 students, it was decided that the new main campus would be built in what is today called the University Heights district. The groundbreaking of the "Megastructure" (now called the A. Zachary Yamba Building) began in June 1972 with the grand opening occurring a little under four years later in April 1976. During this time, in June 1974, the college was officially given its accreditation by the Middles States Association of college and Schools' Commission on Higher Education. The main campus would see expansions in October 1985 (with the opening of the Gymnasium and Child Development Center), in October 1996 (with the opening of the Center for Technology), and in September 1999 (with the opening of the Clara E. Dasher Student Center).

In January 1979, the West Essex Extension Center, a former elementary school, opened in West Caldwell. In 1982 an additional 8 acres (3.2 ha) was purchased and, in September 1985, the newly expanded and renovated Center was unveiled. It would take another four years before the New Jersey State Department of Higher Education would grant the Center full branch campus status, transforming it into the West Essex Campus.

The FOCUS Center (which opened in September 1974) and the Ironbound Center (which opened in September 1979) are two extension centers, located in Newark, which offer off-campus educational services.

In December 1998, operations began at the Public Safety Academy in Cedar Grove.

After the 2010 retirement of long-serving president A. Zachary Yamba, the college went through two separate presidencies in less than a handful of years which led to Yamba being brought back as an interim president in the spring of 2016. In November of that year the college was placed on warning by the Middle States Commission on Higher Education for failing to comply with standards involving institutional resources and governance. That, along with a former athletic coach having been found to have stolen $150,000.00 of college funds, led to a decline in enrollment.

Anthony Munroe was hired by the college in May 2017 to succeed Yamba and help bring the institution back into compliance with the standards set by Middle States but internal issues, including the board of trustees rejecting several of the president's proposed appointees (including a Chief Financial Officer) led to the college being placed on probation. After a reshaping and reorganizing, Munroe and his administration submitted a monitoring report to Middle States on March 1, 2018, which led to a Small Team visit two weeks later where the Middle States representatives reported that the institution appeared to be in compliance with the standards for which it was placed on probation. That same month, the college laid off 20 full-time staff and eliminated 14 vacant positions in an effort to save money; like many community colleges, Essex County College has seen a significant (25% fewer compared to five years ago) decrease in enrollment. On July 2, 2018, in response to the college's actions and changes in its structure and governance, and based upon the recommendation from the Small Team's visit, Middle States reaffirmed the institution's accreditation.

=== Presidents ===
- May 1966 - Robert McCabe (1st)
- January 1969 - Ellis White (2nd)
- May 1971 - J. Harry Smith (3rd, and first college president of color in the State of New Jersey)
- July 1978 - George Harris (4th)
- May 1980 - A. Zachary Yamba (5th)
- April 2010 - Edythe Abdullah (6th)
- March 2013 - Gale E. Gibson (interim)
- October 2013 - Gale E. Gibson (7th)
- March 2016 - A. Zachary Yamba (interim)
- May 2017 - Anthony Munroe (8th)
- July 2020 - Augustine Boakye (interim)
- November 2021 - Augustine Boakye (9th)

== Academics ==
Essex County College offers A.A., A.S., and A.A.S. degree programs in more than 50 different majors. It also offers 26 academic certificate programs. Thousands enroll each year in the college's various degree and non-degree programs, including job training and enrichment programs. Day, evening, weekend, and online courses are offered throughout the fall, semester winter intercession, spring semester, two summer sessions. The college's academic offerings are split up into six distinct divisions:

- Division of Biology, Chemistry, and Physics
- Division of Business
- Division of Humanities and Bilingual Studies
- Division of Mathematics, Engineering Technologies, and Computer Sciences
- Division of Nursing and Health Sciences
- Division of Social Sciences

== Student life ==
Essex County College's students represent over 50 different countries.

More Essex graduates transfer to Rutgers University-Newark, New Jersey Institute of Technology, and Bloomfield College than any other two-year college in the state.

In the fall of 1982 Phi Theta Kappa was chartered.

Dozens of student organized and run clubs exist at the college, including the Short Films Club and the Future Teachers Club.

Over the last decade, over one dozen Essex graduates have received Jack Kent Cooke Foundation Undergraduate Transfer Scholarships, allowing them to attend a four-year institution partially, or entirely, for free.

== Athletics ==
Essex County College's athletic teams, dubbed the Wolverines, are represented in the Garden State Athletic Conference (GSAC) and Region 19 of the National Junior College Athletic Association. Men and women are able to participate in basketball, cross country, soccer, and track & field (indoor and outdoor). Essex athletes have gone on to become All-Americans. The college has also produced more than two dozen athletes who have competed at the Summer Olympics, representing various countries around the world.

== Notable alumni ==
- Jane Burgio (1922–2005), politician who served as secretary of state of New Jersey and as a member of the New Jersey General Assembly
- Steven Corbin (1953-1995), writer who was best known for his novel Fragments That Remain
- Angelo Cruz (born 1958), former basketball player who played for the Puerto Rican National Basketball Team at the 1988 Summer Olympics and mysteriously disappeared in 1998
- Moussa Dembélé (born 1988), a former hurdler who represented Senegal at the 2012 Summer Olympics.
- Joe Evans (1916–2014), jazz saxophonist and founder of Carnival Records
- Jerry Gant (1961–2018), visual artist, poet, performance artist and educator
- Shawn Harvey (born 1966), basketball player
- Larry Hazzard (born 1944), Boxing referee, member of the International Boxing Hall of Fame (graduated with an associate of arts degree, 1970)
- Riker Hylton (born 1988), sprinter who won a bronze medal at the 2011 Athletics World Championships and competed at the 2012 Olympic Games for Jamaica
- Demetrius Pinder (born 1989) Sprinter that won an Olympic gold medal at the 2012 Olympic Games as part of the Bahamas 4x400 relay team
- Ronald Rice (1945–2023), Democratic Party politician who served in the New Jersey State Senate from 1986 to 2022, where he represented the 28th legislative district
- Alonzo Russell (born 1992) Sprinter that won an Olympic bronze medal at the 2016 Olympic Games as part of the Bahamas 4x400 relay team
- Kevin J. Ryan (born 1969), politician who served in the New Jersey General Assembly from 2011 to 2012, representing the 36th legislative district
- Frederick Scalera (born 1958), politician who served in the New Jersey General Assembly from 2003 to 2011, representing the 36th district
- Kenia Sinclair (born 1980), Jamaican-born track star who finished sixth at the 2008 Summer Olympics in the 800m final
- Aron Stewart (born 1950), former basketball player who went on to play for the University of Richmond, winning the 1973 Southern Conference Player of the Year award

== Notable faculty ==
- David A. Berry - history professor who taught at the college for nearly 40 years, was executive director of the Community College Humanities Association for over 25 years, and is a recipient of the National Humanities Medal from President Bill Clinton
- Dr. Clement Alexander Price - American historian who taught at the college in its first academic year before taking a position at Rutgers University-Newark where he was the founding director of the Institute on Ethnicity, Culture, and the Modern Experience, which now bears his name
- Dr. William J. Tooma (Billy Tooma) - award-nominated documentary filmmaker of Clarence Chamberlin: Fly First & Fight Afterward, Poetry of Witness, and The Black Eagle of Harlem who, since 2010, has taught English composition and literature courses

== See also ==
- New Jersey County Colleges
