= Northern Essex Community College =

Public community college in Essex County, Massachusetts, US

Coordinates: 42°47′45.55″N 71°2′51.50″W

- Established: 1961
- President: Lane Glenn
- Students: 4,339 (fall 2022)
- Location: Essex County, Massachusetts, United States
- Website: necc.edu

Northern Essex Community College (NECC) is a public community college in Essex County, Massachusetts. The college serves residents of the Merrimack Valley and Southern New Hampshire. It has campuses in Haverhill and Lawrence. The college is part of the Massachusetts Higher Education system. More than 6,600 students are enrolled in 70 credit associate degree and certificate programs and another 3,400 take noncredit workforce development and community education classes on campus, and at businesses and community sites across the Merrimack Valley. The school's athletic teams are known as the Knights. Northern Essex Community College is accredited by the New England Commission of Higher Education.

Northern Essex offers an active athletic program. It offers men's basketball, baseball, track & field, and cross country. There is also women's volleyball, softball, track & field, and cross country.

== History ==
In the fall of 1961, Northern Essex opened its doors to 186 students in the then-former Greenleaf Elementary School on Chadwick Street in Bradford, Massachusetts. Most were recent graduates of Haverhill High School as well as other high schools in surrounding towns. The college was popular from the start and in 1971 the Haverhill campus was built in the bucolic setting off Route 110.

The Lawrence campus was expanded with The Dimitry Building in 1991, followed by the Louise Haffner Fournier Education Center in 2005, and NECC Riverwalk in 2010.

In 2001, Northern Essex became the first federally designated Hispanic Serving Institution (HSI) in all of New England. The NECC student population is 40% Hispanic – most of whom are from the Dominican Republic and Puerto Rico.

In 2014, the Lawrence campus added its newest building, the El-Hefni Allied Health and Technology Building.

Northern Essex was the first Massachusetts community college to offer Competency Based Education. It is also host to the Northern Essex Community College/Methuen Police Academy, and the Essex County Sheriff's Academy.

== Academics ==
Northern Essex Community College offers over 70 associate degrees and certificates, categorized within 14 areas of study.

== Locations ==
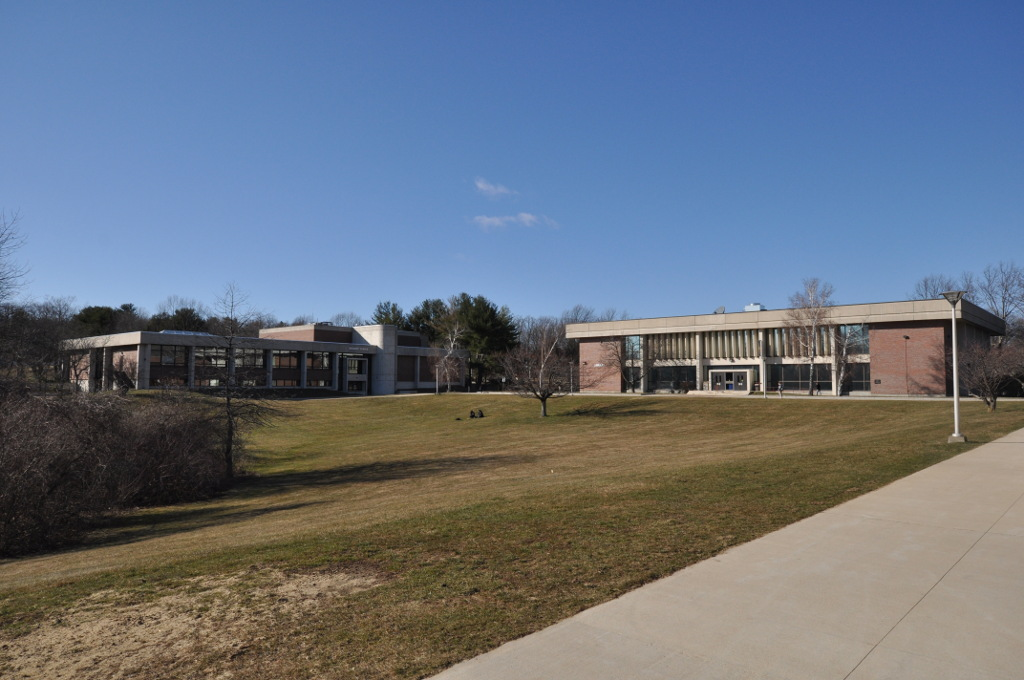
View of the Haverhill campus

The college has a rural 106-acre Haverhill Campus (100 Elliott Street) which features seven campus buildings including the David Hartleb Technology Center (built in 2005) and the Behrakis One-Stop Student Center. There are currently four locations in the nearby city of Lawrence: The Dimitry Building located (45 Franklin Street); The Louise Haffner Fournier Education Center (78 Amesbury Street); the Dr. Ibrahim El Hefni Allied Health and Technology Center (414 Common Street); and another facility at 420 Common Street.

== Publications ==
NECC is home to Parnassus, a literary arts magazine in publication since 1965. Parnassus is student-run and published yearly. It features student work in the form of fiction, poetry, creative nonfiction, art, and photography. Both the 2011 and 2018 issues of Parnassus were awarded a Pacemaker Award from the Associated Collegiate Press, placing best in the nation for two-year colleges. From 2009 to 2013, the magazine was awarded First Place in the Eastern Division of the Community College Humanities Association. Parnassus regularly features special guest authors from the New England area each year, and past guests have included Steve Almond, Andre Dubus III, Stephen King, Gregory Maguire, and Junot Díaz, amongst others.

The NECC Observer is the college's award-winning student newspaper. This paper is run by students and was awarded the designation of "College Gold Crown Newspaper" by the Columbia Scholastic Press Association in 2998. All students are encouraged to write for the Observer.

== Notable alumni ==
- Steve Bedrosian, professional baseball player
- Tom Bergeron, (did not graduate) television personality
- Daniel Lyons, author
- Francisco Urena, politician
