= Shawn Harvey (basketball) =

American basketball player (born 1973)

Personal information
- Born: December 31, 1973 (age 52) Philadelphia, Pennsylvania, U.S.
- Listed height: 6 ft 4 in (1.93 m)
- Listed weight: 180 lb (82 kg)

Career information
- High school: West Philadelphia (Philadelphia, Pennsylvania)
- College: Essex CC (1991–1992); West Virginia State (1993–1996)
- NBA draft: 1996: 2nd round, 34th overall pick
- Drafted by: Dallas Mavericks
- Position: Guard
- Stats at Basketball Reference

Shawn Harvey (born December 31, 1973) is an American former professional basketball player from Essex County Community College and West Virginia State University. He is a 6-foot-4-inch (1.93 m), 180-pound (82 kg) shooting guard. Harvey was drafted by the National Basketball Association's Dallas Mavericks in the second round (#34 pick overall) of the 1996 NBA draft, but he was later released. He was also selected by Florida Beachdogs in second round (#20 pick overall) of 1996 CBA Draft.

He played for the Yakima Sun Kings in the Continental Basketball Association.
