= Todd Fuller =

American basketball player (born 1974)

Personal information
- Born: July 25, 1974 (age 52) Fayetteville, North Carolina, U.S.
- Listed height: 6 ft 11 in (2.11 m)
- Listed weight: 255 lb (116 kg)

Career information
- High school: Charlotte Christian (Charlotte, North Carolina)
- College: NC State (1992–1996)
- NBA draft: 1996: 1st round, 11th overall pick
- Drafted by: Golden State Warriors
- Playing career: 1996–2006
- Position: Center
- Number: 52, 35

Career history
- 1996–1998: Golden State Warriors
- 1999: Utah Jazz
- 1999–2000: Charlotte Hornets
- 2000–2001: Miami Heat
- 2002: Gijón Baloncesto
- 2002: DKV Joventut
- 2002–2003: Bàsquet Manresa
- 2003: Prokom Trefl Sopot
- 2003–2004: CB Tarragona
- 2004–2005: Apollon Patras
- 2006: South Dragons

Career highlights
- First-team All-ACC (1996); Second-team All-ACC (1995); Third-team All-ACC (1994); No. 52 jersey honored by NC State Wolfpack; North Carolina Mr. Basketball (1992)

Career NBA statistics
- Points: 833 (3.7 ppg)
- Rebounds: 674 (3.0 rpg)
- Stats at NBA.com
- Stats at Basketball Reference

Todd Douglas Fuller (born July 25, 1974) is an American former professional basketball player who was selected by the Golden State Warriors with the 11th overall pick of the 1996 NBA draft. He played in five NBA seasons from 1996 to 2001 for the Warriors, Utah Jazz, Charlotte Hornets and Miami Heat, averaging 3.7 ppg. Fuller was drafted ahead of future NBA All-Stars Kobe Bryant, Steve Nash, Peja Stojaković, and Jermaine O'Neal in the 1996 NBA draft. He also played six seasons overseas, on pro teams in Spain, Poland Greece and Australia.

== College career ==
Fuller graduated from Charlotte Christian School in 1992 and played collegiately at North Carolina State University (NC State). While with NC State, he led the Atlantic Coast Conference (ACC) in scoring during his senior year with 20.9 ppg and 9.9 rpg. He was an Academic All-American, and declined a Rhodes Scholarship to the University of Oxford to play professional basketball. He was also inducted into Phi Beta Kappa and graduated summa cum laude in 1996 with a bachelor of science in applied mathematics from NC State. Fuller is also a frequent public speaker.

North Carolina State honored Todd Fuller by hanging his number 52 jersey from the ceiling of the PNC Arena during a halftime ceremony of the Red and White basketball scrimmage game on October 27, 2007.

== Professional career ==
On July 4, 2006, it was announced that Fuller had been signed by the South Dragons of the Australian National Basketball League to play in the team's inaugural season. At a press conference on October 23, 2006 it was announced that coach Mark Price and Fuller had both been released from the South Dragons. Price recruited Fuller as the team's first import player. Fuller averaged 18 points and 9 rebounds per game in his five games with the South Dragons, while shooting 63% from the floor and 70% from the free throw line.

== Personal life ==
Fuller sponsors the annual mathematics competition for Raleigh, North Carolina area high school students through North Carolina State University called the "Todd Fuller Math Competition." He has a scholarship fund set up through the North Carolina State University Physical and Mathematical Sciences (PAMS) college.

Fuller is also known for his strong Christian beliefs including abstinence from sex before marriage. He lives in Charlotte with his wife, the former Elizabeth "Libby" Shaw, who is an elementary school teacher.

Fuller is a frequent global traveler for volunteer events. He participated in the Australian National Baptist Basketball Carnival – an annual youth sporting event held each year in Australia – during January 2008 in Tasmania. He spent three weeks in the Federated States of Micronesia in June 2008, on a volunteer mission to train basketball players to become coaches who in turn helped train islander youth. The team included Dr. Richard Dankworth of the University of the Nations, a frequent supporter of sports youth development in the South Pacific, and former professional basketball player David Wood.

Fuller has been serving on the Airport Advisory Committee for Charlotte-Douglas International Airport since 2008. During his tenure, CLT was given the Eagle Award in 2010, naming CLT the World's Best Airport by the International Air Transport Association(IATA) and opened a third parallel runway in early 2011.

Fuller serves on the Park Scholarships Selection Committee for North Carolina State University. He is currently a licensed high school math teacher. Todd Fuller earned his Master of Science Degree in Analytics (MSA) from North Carolina State University in May 2016.

== See also ==
- List of All-Atlantic Coast Conference men's basketball teams
