= David A. Berry =

American educator

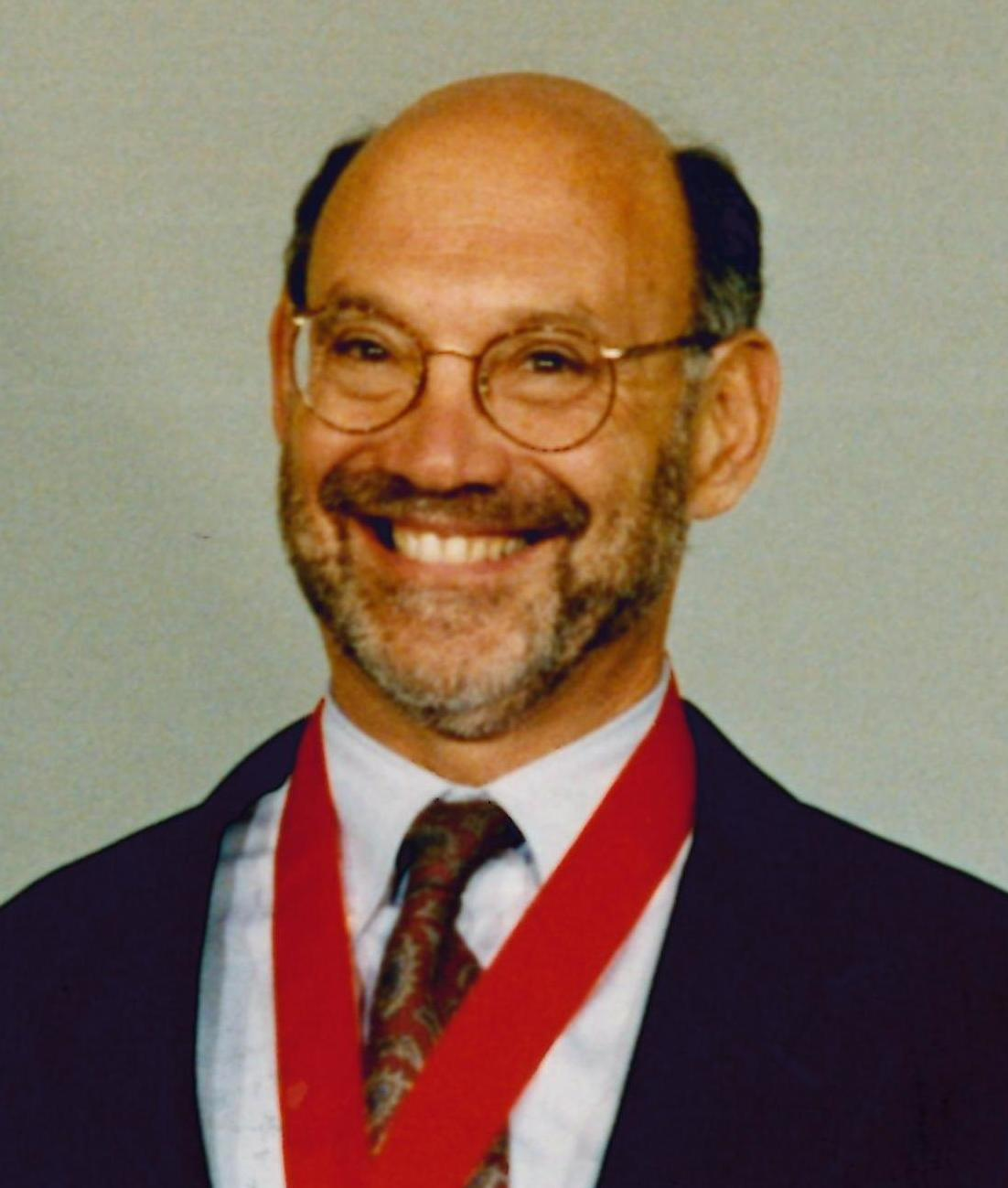
- Berry in 1997
- Born: May 5, 1945 (age 81); Asheville, North Carolina, U.S.
- Education: University of Rochester; University of Connecticut
- Occupations: professor; administrator
- Awards: National Humanities Medal (1997)

David A. Berry (born May 6, 1945) is an American educator and administrator, known for co-founding and leading the Community College Humanities Association. For his efforts to strengthen the humanities curricula in community colleges across the United States, he was awarded the National Humanities Medal in 1997.

== Early life and education ==
David A. Berry was born in Asheville, North Carolina. A year later, his parents moved to Roseland, New Jersey, where he was raised. Berry graduated from West Essex Regional High School. He then attended the University of Rochester, where he earned a bachelor's degree in 1967. In 1969, he earned a master's degree from the University of Connecticut. Afterward, he completed coursework in a PhD program at New York University without taking a degree.

== Career ==
Berry began his career as a high school teacher in Maine, remaining in that position for one year. He declined offers to join the faculty at the University of Alabama and a college in New Hampshire in order to join the faculty at the newly opened Essex County College in Newark, New Jersey. He remained a professor of history at Essex County College for the rest of his teaching career, and he has also been an adjunct professor at New York University.

Berry helped to create the Community College Humanities Association, a national nonprofit association that was founded in 1979. Its purpose is to promote a curriculum in the humanities at two-year colleges. In 1986, Berry co-edited The Introductory History Course: Alternative Directions, a publication developed from a 1984 summer institute which was sponsored by the Community College Humanities Association. The booklet explored alternative approaches to introductory history courses and included a syllabus on the Han Dynasty created by Berry. Berry became the organization's executive director in 1989. He has also chaired the organization's board of directors. In his leadership role, he was instrumental in promoting the humanities at community colleges, including through numerous projects funded by the National Endowment for the Humanities, for which he served as the project director or co-director. Among these initiatives was "Advancing the Humanities at Community Colleges: An NEH Bridging Cultures Project", which provided funding for two-year colleges to develop courses in the humanities. In 1995, he testified before the United States Congress about the value of the National Endowment for the Humanities. He has also directed projects funded by the Ford Foundation and the Funds for the Improvement of Post-Secondary Education.

In 1997, Berry was awarded the National Humanities Medal, which he received from President Bill Clinton in a ceremony at the White House. In his remarks, President Clinton noted that Berry had "broadened the horizons and expanded the dreams" of students across the country.

Berry has been a member of, or held committee roles in, the Organization of American Historians, the American Historical Association, the American Association of Community Colleges, and the Modern Language Association. He has published articles in Women's Studies Quarterly, the Community College Humanities Review, and elsewhere. He has also served on the Alumni Advisory Committee for the University of Rochester's history department.

== Honors ==
- National Humanities Medal (1997)
- Presidential Medallion for Teaching and Service, Essex County College (2002)

In addition, the Community College Humanities Association presents an annual David A. Berry National Humanities Educator Award.
