= Duncan Wu =

British academic and biographer (born 1961)

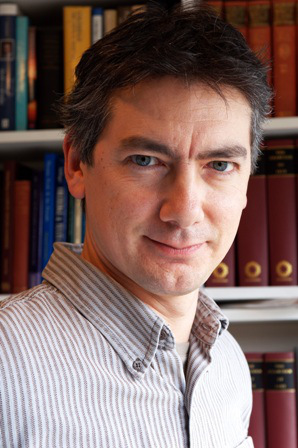
- Born: Duncan Wu; 3 November 1961 (age 64); Woking, Surrey, England
- Education: St Catherine's College, Oxford
- Occupations: Academic, author

Duncan Wu (born 3 November 1961 in Woking, Surrey) is a British academic and biographer.

== Biography ==
Wu is half-Chinese. He received his D.Phil from Oxford University. From 2000 to 2008, he was Professor of English Language and Literature at St Catherine's College, Oxford. He is now the Raymond Wagner Professor of Literary Studies in the English Department at Georgetown University in Washington DC. Wu joined St Catherine's in 2000 as university lecturer, and in 2003 became Professor of English Language and Literature. Before that, he was reader and then professor of English literature at the University of Glasgow, 1995–2000, and before that he was a research fellow of the British Academy, 1991–4.

His first book, Wordsworth's reading 1770-1799, was published in 1993. His popular textbook, Romanticism: An Anthology, went to a third edition in 2005. Besides several other books about Wordsworth, he has written about contemporary British drama, the fiction of William S. Burroughs, and the non-fiction of Charles Lamb and William Hazlitt. He worked with Alasdair Gray on his Book of Prefaces and is a regular contributor to The Daily Telegraph, The Independent, The Guardian and other British newsprints. His latest volume, William Hazlitt: The First Modern Man, was published by Oxford University Press in the UK on 20 October 2008. He is also vice-chairman of The Charles Lamb Society, trustee of The Keats-Shelley Memorial Association, and a founder member and former chairman of The Hazlitt Society.

Wu's interests include music, books, and monster trucks.

== In other media ==
In November 2013, Wu was interviewed, as scholar, for the documentary Poetry of Witness, directed by independent filmmakers Billy Tooma and Anthony Cirilo, alongside his Georgetown University colleague, Carolyn Forché.

== Partial bibliography ==
Works written by Wu include:

- Wordsworth's reading 1770-1799 Cambridge University Press, 1993, ISBN 978-0511519147
- Wordsworth's Reading 1800-1815. Cambridge University Press. 1995. ISBN 978-0-521-49674-2.
- Selected Writings of William Hazlitt (9 vols., 1998)
  - New Writings of William Hazlitt. Oxford University Press. 1 September 2007. p. 262. ISBN 978-0-19-923573-5.
- Making Plays Macmillan Publishers Limited, 2000, ISBN 9780333915615
- Wordsworth: An Inner Life, Wiley, 2002, ISBN 9780631206385
- Wordsworth's Poets Carcanet, 2006, ISBN 9781857546392
- William Hazlitt : The First Modern Man. OUP Oxford. 23 October 2008. ISBN 978-0-19-156361-4.

Edited

- A Companion to Romanticism. John Wiley & Sons. 29 October 1999. ISBN 978-0-631-21877-7.
- Romanticism: An Anthology. John Wiley & Sons. 3 February 2012. ISBN 978-1-118-25657-2.
