= Coleman Nee =

National Commander of the Disabled American Veterans
- Incumbent
- Assumed office 2025
- Preceded by: Daniel Contreras

Massachusetts Secretary of Veterans' Services
- In office 2011–2015
- Preceded by: Thomas G. Kelley
- Succeeded by: Francisco Urena

Personal details
- Party: Democratic
- Spouse: Karyn Swaun
- Children: 2

Military service
- Branch/service: United States Marine Corps Reserve
- Years of service: 1986–1994
- Rank: Corporal

Coleman Nee is an American veterans' organization leader who is the national commander of the Disabled American Veterans. From 2011 to 2015, he was the Massachusetts Secretary of Veterans' Services.

== Early life ==
From 1986 to 1994, Nee served as a member of the United States Marine Corps Reserve, serving in an active-duty deployment during Operation Desert Storm.

Nee worked in public policy advocacy and corporate communications for over 20 years. Among the companies Nee worked for were Bradlees, the Logan Airport Hilton Hotel and Towers, and Julie Country Day School.

== Massachusetts Department of Veterans' Services ==
In 2008, Nee was named Undersecretary of Veterans' Services. In this role he oversaw the creation of the Statewide Advocacy for Veterans’ Empowerment (SAVE) program, which supports veterans and their families coping with the stresses of returning from war and assist them in obtaining veteran's benefits and services. He also helped obtain over $1 million in federal funds to train and find employment for veterans. Additionally, he led outreach efforts to homeless, women, and disabled veterans.

On January 21, 2011, he was named Secretary of Veterans' Services, succeeding Medal of Honor recipient Thomas G. Kelley.

== Non-profit career ==
From 2016 to 2024, Nee was CEO of Triangle, Inc., a Malden, Massachusetts based non-profit that assists people with disabilities and their families.

In 2025, Nee was elected national commander of the Disabled American Veterans. He was a member of the DAV National Executive Committee from 2017 to 2019.
