= Bruce Weigl =

American poet

- Born: January 27, 1949 (age 77); Lorain, Ohio, U.S.
- Education: Oberlin College (BA); University of New Hampshire (MA); University of Utah (PhD)
- Occupation: Poet
- Children: 1 (adopted)
- Writing career
- Notable awards: Pushcart Prize (x2); Lannan Literary Award for Poetry (2006)

Bruce Weigl (born January 27, 1949, Lorain, Ohio) is an American contemporary poet whose work engages profoundly with experience of both Americans and Vietnamese during and after the Vietnam war.

== Biography ==
Weigl enlisted in the United States Army shortly after his 18th birthday and spent three years in the service. He served in the Vietnam War from December 1967 to December 1968 and received the Bronze Star. When he returned to the United States, Weigl obtained a bachelor's degree from Oberlin College and a Master of Arts Degree in Writing/American and British Literature from the University of New Hampshire. From 1975-76, Weigl was an instructor at Lorain County Community College in Elyria, Ohio.

Weigl's first full-length collection of poems, A Romance, was published in 1979. Afterwards, he received a Ph.D. from the University of Utah in 1979, he was an assistant professor of English at the University of Arkansas at Little Rock, and later held the same position at Old Dominion University. Weigl additionally served as the president of the Associated Writing Programs.

During the 1980s, Weigl published two more poetry collections, The Monkey Wars and Song of Napalm. In 1986, Weigl became an associate professor of English at Pennsylvania State University and was later promoted to a professor of English. In 1999, he published two more poetry collections, Archeology of the Circle: New and Selected Poems and After the Others. He left Penn State in 2000 and took a position at Lorain County Community College as a distinguished professor.

He also published a memoir that year titled The Circle of Hanh: A Memoir. Many of Weigl's poems are inspired by the time he spent in the U.S. Army and Vietnam. In The Circle of Hanh, Weigl writes, "The war took away my life and gave me poetry in return...the fate the world has given me is to struggle to write powerfully enough to draw others into the horror."

In addition to writing his own poetry, Weigl worked with Thanh T. Nguyen of the Joiner Research Center to translate poems of North Vietnamese and Viet Cong soldiers captured during the war. Weigl and Nguten accepted an invitation from the Vietnamese Writers Association and traveled to Hanoi to receive assistance in translating the poems. His poems are featured in American Alphabets: 25 Contemporary Poets (2006) and many other anthologies.

== Awards ==
Weigl's first award was a prize from the American Academy of Poets in 1979. He received two Pushcart Prizes, a Patterson Poetry Prize, and a Yaddo Foundation Fellowship. Weigl was awarded the Bread Loaf Fellowship in Poetry in 1981 and was awarded a grant from the National Endowment for the Arts in 1988 for Arts and Creative Writing. He was also nominated for the Pulitzer Prize in 1988 for Song of Napalm, and in 2006 he won the Lannan Literary Award in Poetry. He was 2003 Poetry Panel Chair for the National Book Award. In 2011, Weigl was awarded the Robert Creeley Award by the Robert Creeley Foundation.

On April 15, 2013 it was announced that Weigl's book The Abundance of Nothing was a finalist for the 2013 Pulitzer Prize in Poetry. The Pulitzer jury's citation read:

a powerful collection of poems that explore the trauma of the Vietnam War and the feelings that have never left many of those who fought in the conflict.

== Bruce Weigl and his adopted Vietnamese daughter ==
Bruce Weigl has a Vietnamese adopted daughter named Hạnh Nguyễn Weigl, whom he received from an orphanage in 1996. At that time he told the orphanage that: "Today I receive from you a Vietnamese child. I promised that in the future I will return a Vietnamese lady to you. I will never change her into an American". Indeed, Weigl's family have been trying their best to preserve the Vietnamese elements in Hạnh Nguyễn. For example, they usually encourage her to speak Vietnamese, eat Vietnamese food, and have arranged many meetings between Hạnh Nguyễn and Weigl's Vietnamese friends. Weigl's effort was highly appreciated by Vietnamese media.

== Published works ==
Poetry

- Executioner. Tucson, AZ: Ironwood Press, 1976. OCLC 3122552
- Like a Sack Full of Old Quarrels. Cleveland: Cleveland State University Poetry Series, 1976. ISBN 0914946048 OCLC 2804404
- A Romance. Pittsburgh: University of Pittsburgh Press, 1979. ISBN 0822933934 OCLC 4493734
- The Monkey Wars. Athens: University of Georgia Press, 1984. ISBN 0820307408 OCLC 10912766
- Song of Napalm. New York: Atlantic Monthly Press, 1988. ISBN 0871132419 OCLC 17619586
- What Saves Us. Evanston: Northwestern University Press. 1992. ISBN 978-0-8101-5013-3. "Bruce Weigl."
- Lies, Grace, and Redemption: [Poems and Interview]. English Dept. of Kutztown University. 1995. OCLC 34304998.
- Sweet Lorain. Evanston: Northwestern University Press. 1996. ISBN 978-0-8101-5053-9.
- Not on the Map. Chester Springs, PA: Dufour, 1996.
- Archeology of the Circle: New and Selected Poems. New York: Grove Press. 1999. ISBN 978-0-8021-3607-7.
- After the Others. Evanston, IL: Triquarterly Books/Northwestern UP, 1999.
- The unraveling strangeness: poems. Grove Press. 2002. ISBN 978-0-8021-3938-2.
- Declension in the village of Chung Luong. Ausable Press. 2006. ISBN 978-1-931337-31-1. "Bruce Weigl."
- The Abundance of Nothing. Evanston, IL: Triquarterly Books/Northwestern UP, 2012. ISBN 978-0-810152-23-6
- Among Elms, in Ambush. Rochester, NY: BOA Editions, Ltd., 2021. ISBN 978-1-950774-41-8

Translation

- Thanh T. Nguyen, Bruce Weigl (1994). Poems from Captured Documents. University of Massachusetts Press. ISBN 978-0-87023-922-9. "Bruce Weigl."

Prose

- The Circle of Hanh: A Memoir. New York: Grove Press. 2000. ISBN 978-0-8021-3805-7. OCLC 42080135. "Bruce Weigl."

== Reviews ==
One has to go back to the poetry of James Wright to find a writer who has used the fallen industrial landscape of the Midwest as effectively as Bruce Weigl, or to that of Frost for one who has used narrative so prominently. These are lofty comparisons, but The Monkey Wars is equal to them. When Weigl's dramas are not revealing a mythical and violent Midwest, they unveil a disruptive, wargutted Vietnamese landscape in a way I can recall no other writer doing.

== In other media ==
In June 2014, Weigl was interviewed for the documentary Poetry of Witness, directed by independent filmmakers Billy Tooma and Anthony Cirilo.
