= Robert Creeley Foundation =

Defunct poetry foundation in the United States of America

The Robert Creeley Foundation was a poetry foundation based in Acton, Massachusetts, dedicated to honoring the legacy of American poet Robert Creeley. The Foundation presented the Robert Creeley Award to a nationally recognized poet each year, and it had an active role in promoting poetry and the arts in the local community, particularly via close relationships with the Acton-Boxborough Regional High School and Acton Memorial Library. The Foundation ceased operations in 2018.

The award and foundation stem from a "chance meeting" between Robert Clawson and Robert Creeley in late 2000.

Robert Creeley participated in selecting the award winners until his death in 2005.

== Robert Creeley Award ==
The following are the winners of the Robert Creeley Award:

- 2001 — Robert Creeley
- 2002 — Galway Kinnell
- 2003 — Grace Paley
- 2004 — Martín Espada
- 2005 — C. D. Wright
- 2006 — Carolyn Forché
- 2007 — Yusef Komunyakaa
- 2008 — John Ashbery
- 2009 — Sonia Sanchez
- 2010 — Gary Snyder
- 2011 — Bruce Weigl
- 2012 — Thomas Lux
- 2013 — Naomi Shihab Nye
- 2014 — Mary Ruefle
- 2015 — Ron Padgett
- 2016 — Tracy K. Smith
- 2017 — Marie Howe
- 2018 — Mark Doty

== Student programs ==
The Foundation also awarded the Helen Creeley Student Poetry Prize to honor Robert Creeley's older sister Helen, a prize-winning poet while she was a high school student, who was an early mentor to Robert. The prize was awarded to one or two Massachusetts high school students each year.

Students received a monetary prize and also the opportunity to read their work as an opener to the Robert Creeley Award winner.

The past winners of the Helen Creeley Student Poetry Prize are:

- 2018 — Malia Chung (Milton Academy) and Jocelyn Shen (Phillips Academy)
- 2017 — Emma Crockford (Rising Tide Charter High School) and Claudia Inglessis (Buckingham Browne & Nichols)
- 2016 — Alma Bitran (Brookline High School) and Samantha Mackertich (Walnut Hill School for the Arts)
- 2015 — Nicole Blackwood (Newburyport High School) and Sequoia LeBreux (Mohawk Trail Regional High School)
- 2014 — Talin Tahajian (Belmont High School)
- 2013 — Charina Hanley (ABRHS) and Talin Tahajian (Belmont High School)
- 2012 — Soubhik Barari (ABRHS) and Alessandra Davy-Falconi (Boston University Academy)
- 2011 — Soubhik Barari (ABRHS) and Emily Sager (ABRHS)
- 2010 — Andy Vo (Boston Latin) and Melanie Wang (Wayland High School)
- 2009 — Kaila Guilmet (ABRHS) and Anna Cataldo (Concord-Carlisle)
- 2008 — Michael Bottari (ABRHS) and Peter Boskey (Concord Academy)
- 2007 — Brendan Fitzmaurice (ABRHS)
