= 1996 NBA draft =

Basketball player selection

General information
- Sport: Basketball
- Date: June 26, 1996
- Location: Continental Airlines Arena (East Rutherford, New Jersey)
- Network: TNT

Overview
- 58 total selections in 2 rounds
- League: NBA
- First selection: Allen Iverson (Philadelphia 76ers)
- Hall of Famers: 5: SG Allen Iverson; SG Ray Allen; SG Kobe Bryant; PG Steve Nash; C Ben Wallace

The 1996 NBA draft was the 50th draft in the National Basketball Association (NBA). It was held on June 26, 1996, at Continental Airlines Arena in East Rutherford, New Jersey. In this draft, NBA teams took turns selecting college basketball players and other first-time eligible players, such as players from high schools and non-North American leagues. The Vancouver Grizzlies had the highest probability to win the NBA draft lottery, but since they were an expansion team along with the Toronto Raptors, they were not allowed to select first in this draft. The team with the second-highest probability, the Philadelphia 76ers, won the lottery and obtained the first selection. The Toronto Raptors and the Vancouver Grizzlies were second and third, respectively. The Raptors won the first overall pick in 1996, but they had to give that up due to the expansion agreement with the league.

It is widely considered to be one of the deepest and most talented NBA drafts in history, with one-third of the first-round picks later becoming NBA All-Stars. The draft class produced three players who won a combined four NBA MVP awards (Kobe Bryant, Allen Iverson, Steve Nash), seven other drafted players who became All-Stars (Shareef Abdur-Rahim, Ray Allen, Žydrūnas Ilgauskas, Stephon Marbury, Jermaine O'Neal, Peja Stojaković, Antoine Walker), and one undrafted All-Star (Ben Wallace), for a grand total of 11 All-Stars. Moreover, eight players from this draft class have been named to at least one All-NBA Team, the most among any draft. The draft class also produced three players who have been named to the NBA's all-defensive first team: Bryant, Marcus Camby, and Wallace. Camby won the Defensive Player of the Year Award in 2007, while Wallace earned the same award in 2002, 2003, 2005, and 2006. Five-time NBA champion Derek Fisher was also selected in the draft.

The 76ers selected two future Major League Baseball players, Mark Hendrickson and Ryan Minor, with their second-round picks.

Most experts rate it along with the 1984 NBA draft and the 2003 NBA draft as one of the best drafts in history. Sports Illustrated named it the second-best, behind the 1984 draft, which included a draft class of Hakeem Olajuwon, Michael Jordan, Charles Barkley, Alvin Robertson, and John Stockton.

== Key ==
PG	Point guard	SG	Shooting guard	SF	Small forward	PF	Power forward	C	Center

^	Denotes player who has been inducted to the Naismith Memorial Basketball Hall of Fame
*	Denotes player who has been selected for at least one All-Star Game and All-NBA Team
^{+}	Denotes player who has been selected for at least one All-Star Game
^{x}	Denotes player who has been selected for at least one All-NBA Team
^{#}	Denotes player who has never appeared in an NBA regular-season or playoff game
^{~}	Denotes player who has been selected as Rookie of the Year

== Draft selections ==
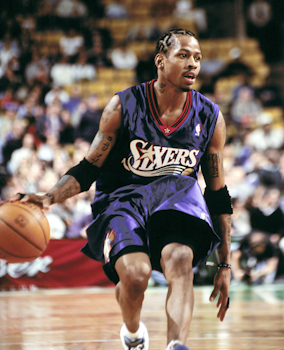
Allen Iverson was selected 1st overall by the Philadelphia 76ers.

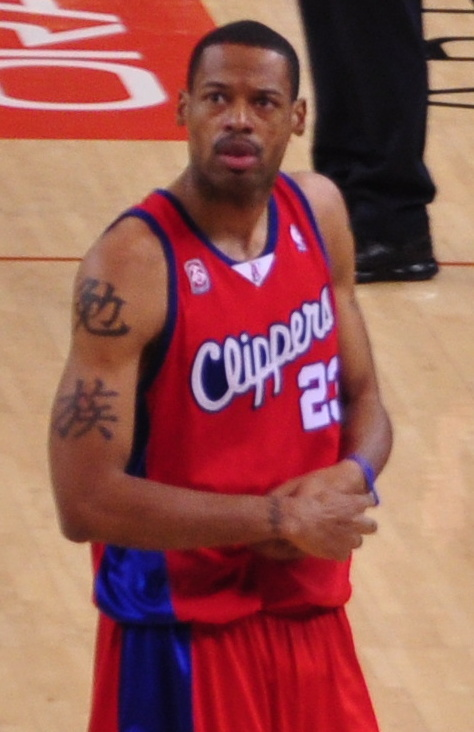
Marcus Camby was selected 2nd overall by the Toronto Raptors.

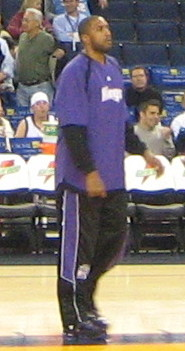
Shareef Abdur-Rahim was selected 3rd overall by the Vancouver Grizzlies.

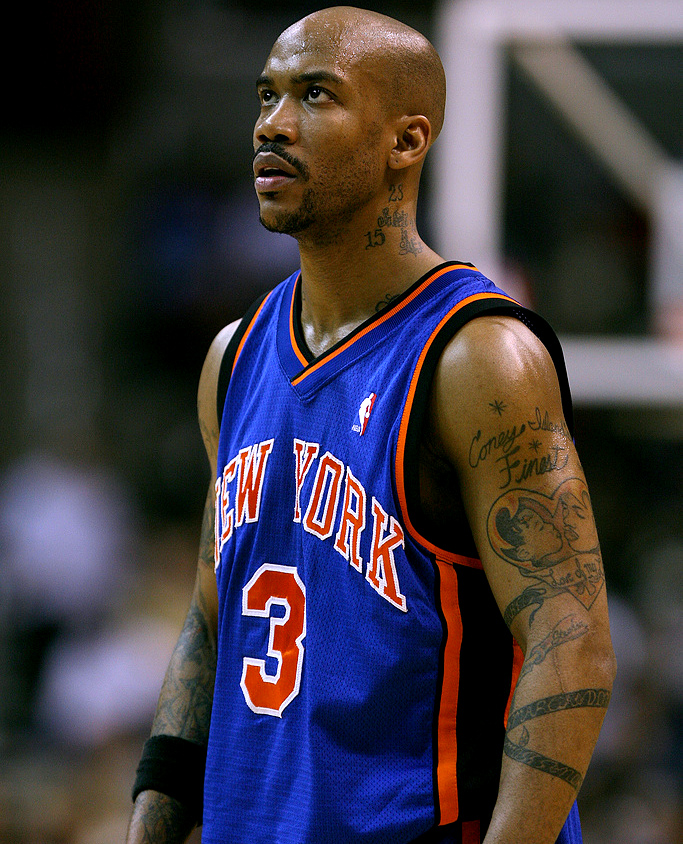
Stephon Marbury was selected 4th overall by the Milwaukee Bucks (traded to the Minnesota Timberwolves).

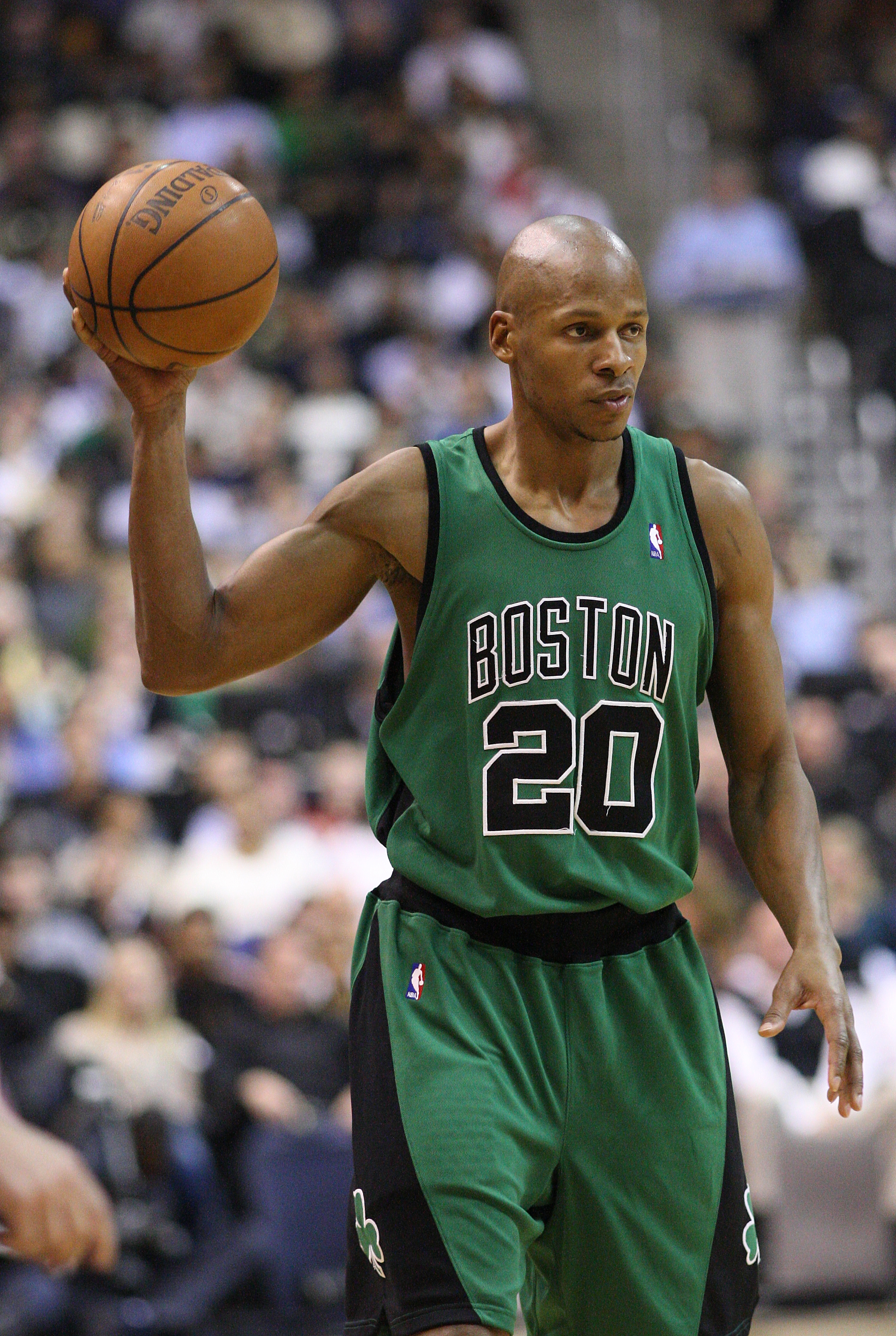
Ray Allen was selected 5th overall by the Minnesota Timberwolves (traded to the Milwaukee Bucks).

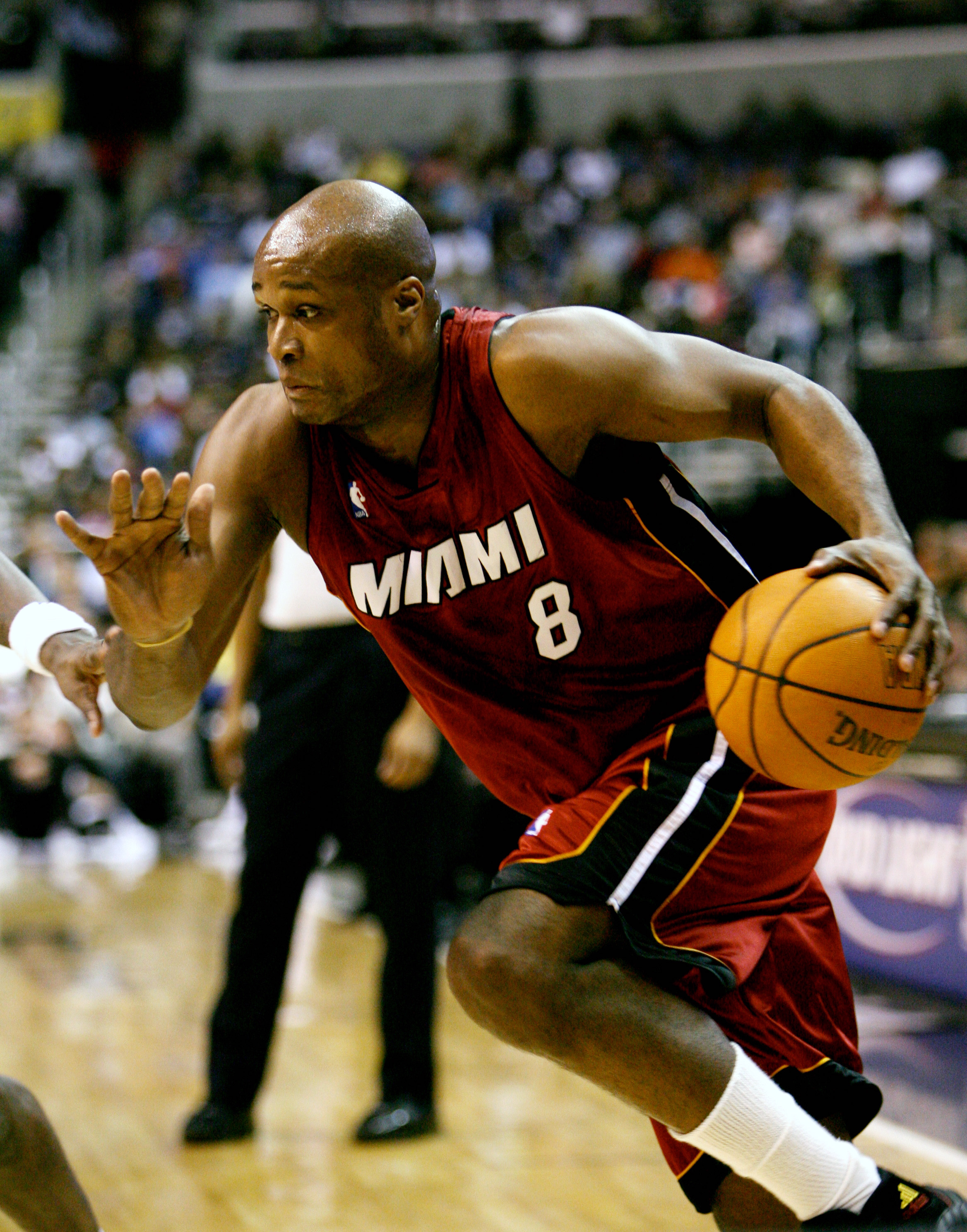
Antoine Walker was selected 6th overall by the Boston Celtics.

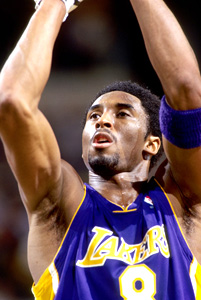
Kobe Bryant was selected 13th overall by the Charlotte Hornets (traded to the Los Angeles Lakers).

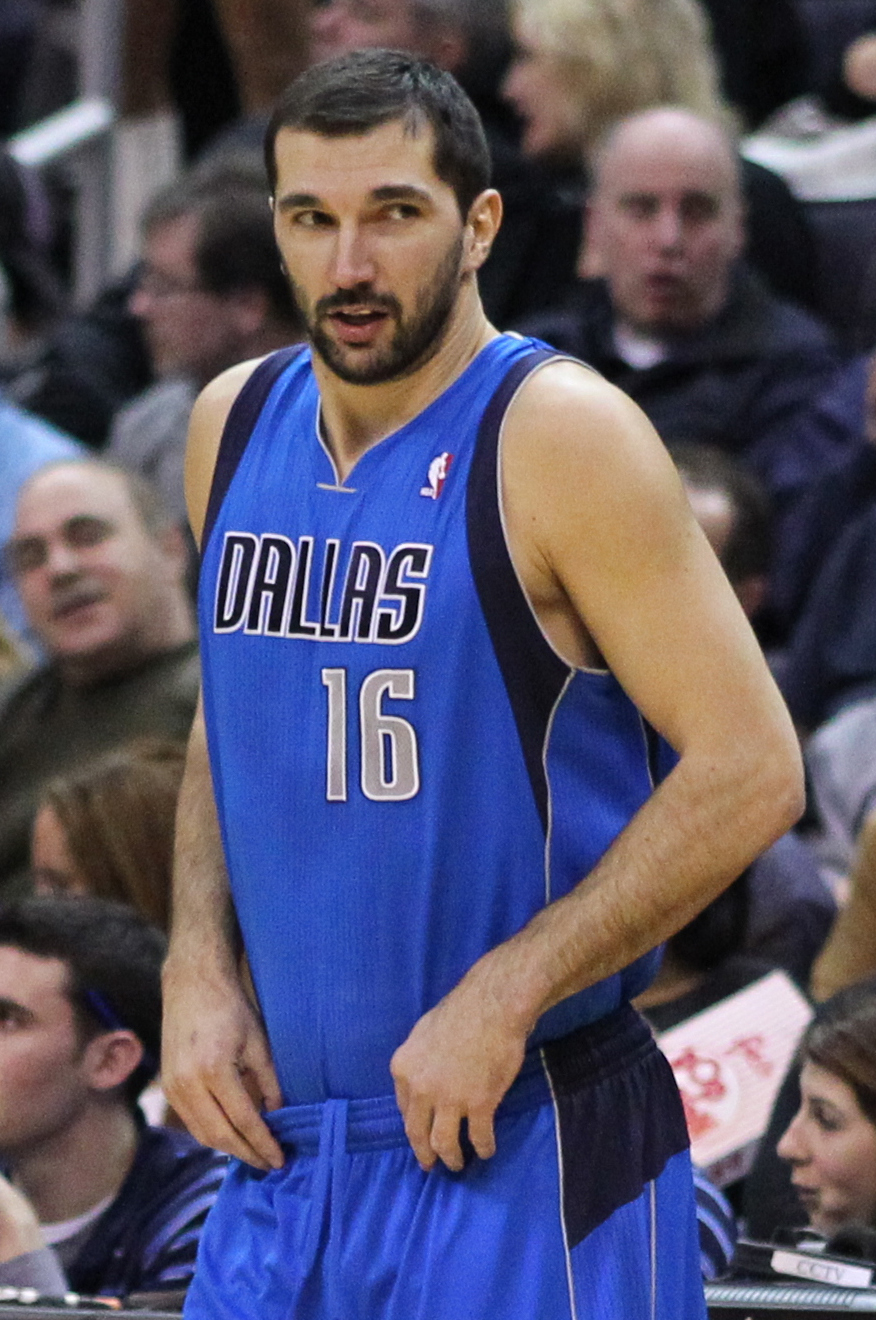
Peja Stojaković was selected 14th overall by the Sacramento Kings.

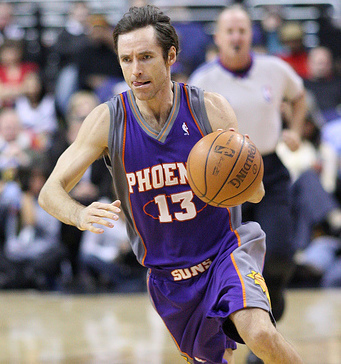
Steve Nash was selected 15th overall by the Phoenix Suns.

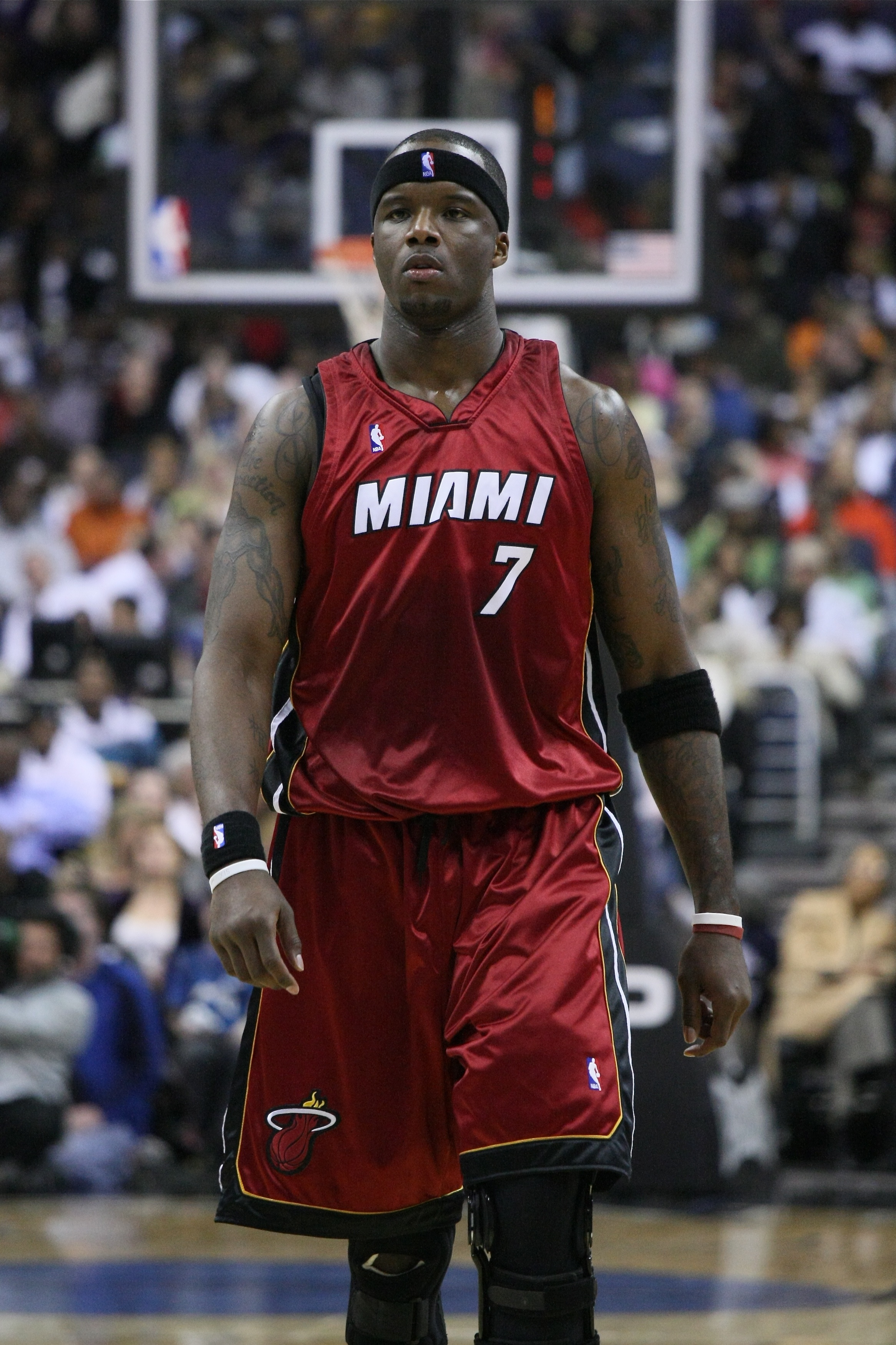
Jermaine O'Neal was selected 17th overall by the Portland Trail Blazers.

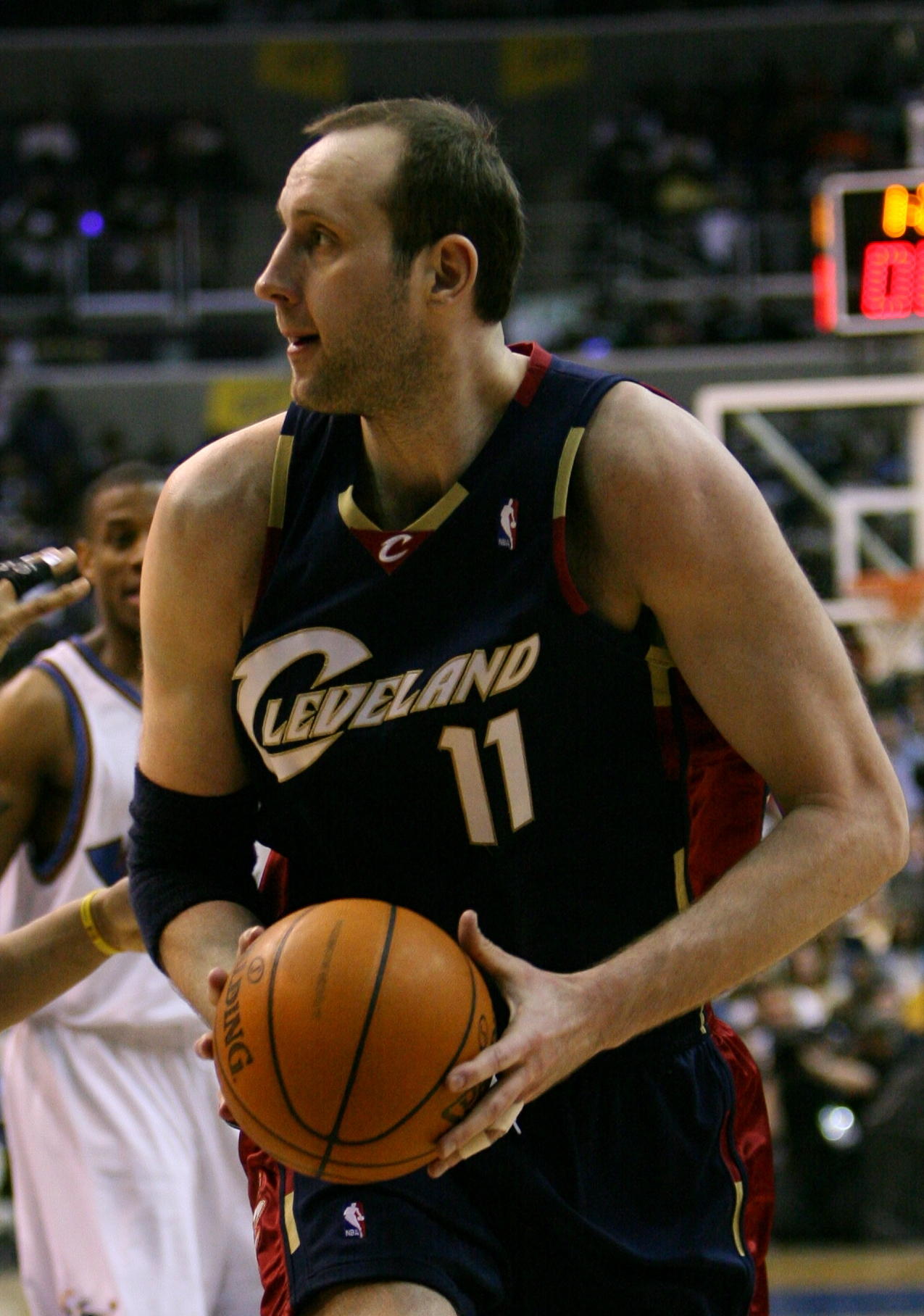
Žydrūnas Ilgauskas was selected 20th overall by the Cleveland Cavaliers.

Round	Pick	Player	Pos.	Nationality (Note: Nationality indicates the player's national team or representative nationality. If a player has not competed at the international level, then the nationality indicates the national team which the player is eligible to represent according to FIBA rules.)	NBA team	School/Club team
1	1	Allen Iverson^~	SG/PG	United States	Philadelphia 76ers	Georgetown (So.)
1	2	Marcus Camby	C	United States	Toronto Raptors	Massachusetts (Jr.)
1	3	Shareef Abdur-Rahim^{+}	F	United States	Vancouver Grizzlies	California (Fr.)
1	4	Stephon Marbury*	G	United States	Milwaukee Bucks (traded to Minnesota)	Georgia Tech (Fr.)
1	5	Ray Allen^	SG	United States	Minnesota Timberwolves (traded to Milwaukee)	Connecticut (Jr.)
1	6	Antoine Walker^{+}	F	United States	Boston Celtics (from Dallas)	Kentucky (So.)
1	7	Lorenzen Wright	C	United States	Los Angeles Clippers	Memphis (So.)
1	8	Kerry Kittles	SG	United States	New Jersey Nets	Villanova (Sr.)
1	9	Samaki Walker	F	United States	Dallas Mavericks (from Boston)	Louisville (So.)
1	10	Erick Dampier	C	United States	Indiana Pacers (from Denver)	Mississippi State (Jr.)
1	11	Todd Fuller	C	United States	Golden State Warriors (from Golden State via Orlando and Washington)	NC State (Sr.)
1	12	Vitaly Potapenko	C	Ukraine	Cleveland Cavaliers (from Washington)	Wright State (Jr.)
1	13	Kobe Bryant^	SG	United States	Charlotte Hornets (traded to L.A. Lakers)	Lower Merion HS (Lower Merion, Pennsylvania)
1	14	Peja Stojaković*	F	FR Yugoslavia	Sacramento Kings	P.A.O.K. (Greece)
1	15	Steve Nash^	PG	Canada	Phoenix Suns	Santa Clara (Sr.)
1	16	Tony Delk	G	United States	Charlotte Hornets (from Miami)	Kentucky (Sr.)
1	17	Jermaine O'Neal*	F/C	United States	Portland Trail Blazers	Eau Claire High School (Columbia, South Carolina)
1	18	John Wallace	F	United States	New York Knicks (from Detroit via San Antonio)	Syracuse (Sr.)
1	19	Walter McCarty	F	United States	New York Knicks (from Atlanta via Miami)	Kentucky (Sr.)
1	20	Žydrūnas Ilgauskas^{+}	C	Lithuania	Cleveland Cavaliers	Atletas Kaunas (Lithuania)
1	21	Dontae' Jones	F	United States	New York Knicks	Mississippi State (Jr.)
1	22	Roy Rogers	F	United States	Vancouver Grizzlies (from Houston)	Alabama (Sr.)
1	23	Efthimios Rentzias	C	Greece	Denver Nuggets (from Indiana)	PAOK (Greece)
1	24	Derek Fisher	G	United States	Los Angeles Lakers	Arkansas-Little Rock (Sr.)
1	25	Martin Müürsepp	F	Estonia	Utah Jazz (traded to Miami)	Kalev (Estonia)
1	26	Jerome Williams	F	United States	Detroit Pistons (from San Antonio)	Georgetown (Sr.)
1	27	Brian Evans	F	United States	Orlando Magic	Indiana (Sr.)
1	28	Priest Lauderdale	C	United States	Atlanta Hawks (from Seattle)	Peristeri (Greece)
1	29	Travis Knight	C	United States	Chicago Bulls	Connecticut (Sr.)
2	30	Othella Harrington	F/C	United States	Houston Rockets (from Vancouver)	Georgetown (Sr.)
2	31	Mark Hendrickson	G	United States	Philadelphia 76ers	Washington State (Sr.)
2	32	Ryan Minor^{#}	G	United States	Philadelphia 76ers (from Toronto)	Oklahoma (Sr.)
2	33	Moochie Norris	G	United States	Milwaukee Bucks	West Florida (So.)
2	34	Shawn Harvey^{#}	G	United States	Dallas Mavericks	West Virginia State (Sr.)
2	35	Joseph Blair^{#}	C	United States	Seattle SuperSonics (from Minnesota)	Arizona (Sr.)
2	36	Doron Sheffer^{#}	G	Israel	Los Angeles Clippers	Connecticut (Sr.)
2	37	Jeff McInnis	G	United States	Denver Nuggets (from New Jersey via Sacramento)	North Carolina (Jr.)
2	38	Steve Hamer	C	United States	Boston Celtics	Tennessee (Sr.)
2	39	Russ Millard^{#}	F	United States	Phoenix Suns (from Denver, via L.A. Clippers and Detroit)	Iowa (Sr.)
2	40	Marcus Mann^{#}	F	United States	Golden State Warriors	Mississippi Valley State (Sr.)
2	41	Jason Sasser	F	United States	Sacramento Kings	Texas Tech (Sr.)
2	42	Randy Livingston	G	United States	Houston Rockets (from Vancouver via Washington and Orlando)	LSU (So.)
2	43	Ben Davis	F	United States	Phoenix Suns	Arizona (Sr.)
2	44	Malik Rose	F	United States	Charlotte Hornets	Drexel (Sr.)
2	45	Joe Vogel^{#}	C	United States	Seattle SuperSonics (from Miami via Atlanta)	Colorado State (Sr.)
2	46	Marcus Brown	G	United States	Portland Trail Blazers	Murray State (Sr.)
2	47	Ron Riley^{#}	G/F	United States	Seattle SuperSonics (from Atlanta)	Arizona State (Sr.)
2	48	Jamie Feick	F	United States	Philadelphia 76ers (from Detroit)	Michigan State (Sr.)
2	49	Amal McCaskill	C	United States	Orlando Magic (from New York via Minnesota and Vancouver)	Marquette (Sr.)
2	50	Terrell Bell^{#}	C	United States	Houston Rockets (from Cleveland)	Georgia (Sr.)
2	51	Chris Robinson	G	United States	Vancouver Grizzlies (from Houston)	Western Kentucky (Sr.)
2	52	Mark Pope	F	United States	Indiana Pacers	Kentucky (Sr.)
2	53	Jeff Nordgaard	F	United States	Milwaukee Bucks (from L.A. Lakers via Seattle)	Wisconsin–Green Bay (Sr.)
2	54	Shandon Anderson	F	United States	Utah Jazz	Georgia (Sr.)
2	55	Ronnie Henderson^{#}	G	United States	Washington Bullets (from San Antonio via Charlotte)	LSU (Jr.)
2	56	Reggie Geary	G	United States	Cleveland Cavaliers (from Orlando)	Arizona (Sr.)
2	57	Drew Barry	G	United States	Seattle SuperSonics	Georgia Tech (Sr.)
2	58	Darnell Robinson^{#}	F	United States	Dallas Mavericks (from Chicago)	Arkansas (Jr.)

== Notable undrafted players ==
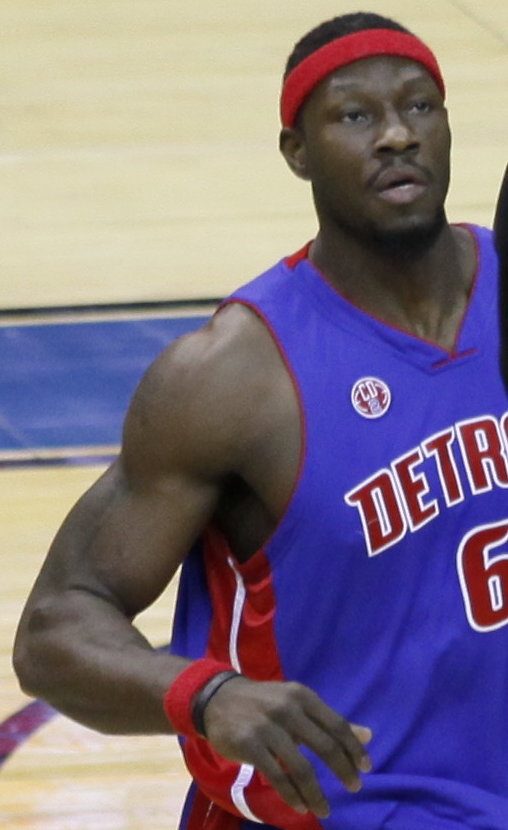
Ben Wallace, not selected in the draft, had a successful career including 4 All-Star selections, and became the first undrafted NBA player of the modern era to be elected to the Hall of Fame.

The following are undrafted players of the 1996 NBA Draft but later played in the NBA.

Player	Pos.	Nationality	School/Club team
Chucky Atkins	G	United States	South Florida (Sr.)
Ira Bowman	G	United States	Penn (Sr.)
William Cunningham	C	United States	Temple (Sr.)
Adrian Griffin	F/G	United States	Seton Hall (Sr.)
Darvin Ham	F	United States	Texas Tech (Sr.)
Ben Handlogten	C	United States	Western Michigan (Sr.)
Juaquin Hawkins	F	United States	Long Beach State (Sr.)
Rick Hughes	F/C	United States	Thomas More (Sr.)
İbrahim Kutluay	G	Turkey	Fenerbahçe (Turkey)
Rusty LaRue	G	United States	Wake Forest (Sr.)
Horacio Llamas	C	Mexico	Grand Canyon (Sr.)
Art Long	F	United States	Cincinnati (Sr.)
Joe Stephens	F	United States	Little Rock (Sr.)
Erick Strickland	G	United States	Nebraska (Sr.)
Ben Wallace^	C/F	United States	Virginia Union (Sr.)
Brandon Williams	G/F	United States	Davidson (Sr.)

== Early entrants ==
=== College underclassmen ===
This year would officially see a steep climb up of the number of underclassmen declaring their entry into the NBA. While previous years starting in 1971 would see a relatively small amount of college underclassmen alongside overseas and even high school players not only officially declare their entry to the draft, but also sticking with it, this year saw an official total of 42 different players that qualified as underclassmen see an initial entry into the NBA draft. However, six of these players (those being the Nigerian born Sunday Adebayo from the University of Arkansas, Carlos Knox from IUPUI, Terquin Mott from Coppin State University, Mark Sanford from the University of Washington, Jess Settles from the University of Iowa, and Kebu Stewart from Cal State Bakersfield) would ultimately withdraw their initial entry into this year's NBA draft, leaving 29 players that declared for the NBA draft as proper college underclassmen, three high school players (including Kobe Bryant and Jermaine O'Neal) entering the NBA draft as high school seniors, three proper international players (including the first two teammates from the same team) entering directly from overseas play, and one player named Priest Lauderdale previously leaving Central State University to play for the Peristeri B.C. in Greece for a grand total of 36 players that would qualify as underclassmen. That being said, the following college basketball players successfully applied for early draft entrance.

- (United States) Shareef Abdur-Rahim – F, California (freshman)
- (United States) Ray Allen – G, Connecticut (junior)
- (United States) Marcus Camby – C, Massachusetts (junior)
- (United States) Erick Dampier – C, Mississippi State (junior)
- (United States) Randy Edney – C, Mount St. Mary's (junior)
- (United States) Eric Gingold – C, Williams (junior)
- (United States) LeMarcus Golden – G, Memphis (junior)
- (United States) Ronnie Henderson – G, LSU (junior)
- (United States) Allen Iverson – G, Georgetown (sophomore)
- (United States) Willie Jackson – F, Lawson CC (freshman)
- (United States) Dontae' Jones – F, Mississippi State (junior)
- (United States) Chris Kingsbury – G, Iowa (junior)
- (United States) Idris Lee – G, Mount Senario (junior)
- (United States) Randy Livingston – G, LSU (sophomore)
- (United States) Michael Lloyd – G, Auburn Montgomery (junior)
- (United States) Stephon Marbury – G, Georgia Tech (freshman)
- (Cuba) Richard Matienzo – F, Miami Dade (freshman)
- (Sudan) Dut Mayar Madut – C, Frank Phillips (freshman)
- (United States) Jeff McInnis – G, North Carolina (junior)
- (United States) Chris Nurse – F, Delaware State (junior)
- (United States) Jason Osborne – F, Louisville (junior)
- (United States) Jessie Pate – G, Arkansas (junior)
- (Ukraine) Vitaly Potapenko – F/C, Wright State (junior)
- (United States) Darnell Robinson – F/C, Arkansas (junior)
- (United States) Greg Simpson – G, West Virginia (junior)
- (United States) Kevin Simpson – G, Dixie (sophomore)
- (United States) Antoine Walker – F, Kentucky (sophomore)
- (United States) Samaki Walker – F, Louisville (sophomore)
- (United States) Lorenzen Wright – F, Memphis (sophomore)

=== High school players ===
This year marked the second year in a row where high school players would be allowed entry into the NBA directly from high school after previously not allowing high schoolers to enter the NBA draft directly since 1975. The following high school players successfully applied for early draft entrance.

- (United States) Kobe Bryant – G, Lower Merion HS (Lower Merion, Pennsylvania)
- (United States) Taj McDavid – G, Palmetto HS (Williamston, South Carolina)
- (United States) Jermaine O'Neal – F, Eau Claire HS (Columbia, South Carolina)

=== International players ===
This year marked the first time that international teammates would declare their entry into the NBA draft simultaneously. The following international players successfully applied for early draft entrance.

- Zydrunas Ilgauskas – C, Atletas Kaunas (Lithuania)
- Efthimios Rentzias – F/C, P.A.O.K. B.C. (Greece)
- (Federal Republic of Yugoslavia) Peja Stojaković – F, P.A.O.K. B.C. (Greece)

=== Other eligible players ===
Player	Team	Note	Ref.
(United States) Priest Lauderdale	Peristeri B.C. (Greece)	Left Central State in 1995; playing professionally since the 1995–96 season	

== Invited attendees ==
The 1996 NBA draft is considered to be the nineteenth NBA draft to have utilized what's properly considered the "green room" experience for NBA prospects. The NBA's green room is a staging area where anticipated draftees often sit with their families and representatives, waiting for their names to be called on draft night. Often being positioned either in front of or to the side of the podium (in this case, being positioned somewhere within the Continental Airlines Arena), once a player heard his name, he would walk to the podium to shake hands and take promotional photos with the NBA commissioner. From there, the players often conducted interviews with various media outlets while backstage. From there, the players often conducted interviews with various media outlets while backstage. However, once the NBA draft started to air nationally on TV starting with the 1980 NBA draft, the green room evolved from players waiting to hear their name called and then shaking hands with these select players who were often called to the hotel to take promotional pictures with the NBA commissioner a day or two after the draft concluded to having players in real-time waiting to hear their names called up and then shaking hands with David Stern, the NBA's commissioner at the time. The NBA compiled its list of green room invites through collective voting by the NBA's team presidents and general managers alike, which in this year's case belonged to only what they believed were the top 19 prospects at the time. Despite the high number of invites and successful draft prospects involved for this year's draft, there would still be some notable absences to not be invited for this year's draft in Shareef Abdur-Rahim from the University of California, Jermaine O'Neal from Eau Claire High School in South Carolina, and arguably Ben Wallace from Virginia Union University. With that in mind, the following players were invited to attend this year's draft festivities live and in person.

- (United States) Ray Allen – SG, Connecticut
- (United States) Kobe Bryant – SG, Lower Merion High School (Lower Merion Township, Pennsylvania)
- (United States) Marcus Camby – C, Massachusetts
- (United States) Erick Dampier – C, Mississippi State
- (United States) Todd Fuller – C, North Carolina State
- Žydrūnas Ilgauskas – C, Atletas Kaunas (Lithuania)
- (United States) Allen Iverson – PG, Georgetown
- (United States) Kerry Kittles – SG, Villanova
- (United States) Stephon Marbury – PG, Georgia Tech
- (United States) Walter McCarty – SF/PF, Kentucky
- (Canada) / (South Africa) Steve Nash – PG, Santa Clara
- (Ukraine) Vitaly Potapenko – C, Wright State
- (United States) Roy Rogers – PF, Alabama
- (Federal Republic of Yugoslavia) / (Croatia) Predrag "Peja" Stojaković – SF, P.A.O.K. B.C. (Greece)
- (United States) Antoine Walker – SF/PF, Kentucky
- (United States) Samaki Walker – PF/C, Louisville
- (United States) John Wallace – SF, Syracuse
- (United States) Jerome Williams – PF, Georgetown
- (United States) Lorenzen Wright – C, Memphis

== See also ==
- List of first overall NBA draft picks
