= Francisco Urena =

Massachusetts Secretary of Veterans' Affairs

Massachusetts Secretary of Veterans' Services
- In office January 8, 2015 – June 24, 2020
- Governor: Charlie Baker
- Preceded by: Coleman Nee
- Succeeded by: Cheryl Lussier Poppe

Boston Commissioner of Veterans' Services
- In office 2011–2015
- Preceded by: Eugene Vaillancourt
- Succeeded by: Giselle Sterling

Lawrence, Massachusetts Director of Veterans' Services
- In office 2007–2011

Personal details
- Born: Dominican Republic
- Party: Republican
- Spouse: Jennifer Siegler (m. 2014)
- Education: Northern Essex Community College; University of Massachusetts Lowell; Attended University of Massachusetts Boston
- Occupation: Marine; Veterans' services officer State cabinet secretary

Military service
- Branch/service: United States Marine Corps
- Years of service: 1998–2006
- Rank: Staff sergeant

Francisco Urena is a Dominican-born American government official and former Marine who served as the Massachusetts Secretary of Veterans' Affairs and previously served as the Veterans' Services Officer for the cities of Boston and Lawrence, Massachusetts.

== Early life ==
Urena was born in the Dominican Republic. When he was four years old his family moved to Lawrence, Massachusetts. However, increasing violence in the city caused them to relocate to South Florida. Urena graduated from South Broward High School in 1998.

== Military career ==
After graduating from high school 1998, Urena joined the United States Marine Corps. In 2001 he was accepted into the Marine Embassy Guard Program. Following the September 11 attacks, Urena requested a more active assignment, but instead was ordered to report to security school immediately. After graduating from the program, he worked as a security guard at the United States embassies in Syria and Kyrgyzstan.

Urena was later moved to Iraq's Al Anbar Governorate, where he served as a tank commander during Operation Iraqi Freedom. During a fight with insurgents, he was struck by flying glass and debris, including a piece of scrap metal that became stuck in his left cheek. Because surgery to remove the piece could leave a permanent scar, Urena has opted not to take it out. He was awarded the Purple Heart for his injury. Urena was honorably discharged in November 2005.

== Lawrence Director of Veterans' Services ==
After receiving his discharge, Urena returned to Lawrence. He worked as a security guard, attended Northern Essex Community College, and volunteered in Lawrence's Veterans' Services office and at the local public-access television station. In January 2007, Mayor Michael J. Sullivan chose Urena to serve as Lawrence's Director of Veterans Services. Following the May 2007 abduction of U.S. soldiers in Iraq, Urena assisted the family of captured U.S. Army Specialist Alex Jimenez. In 2008, Urena was named Massachusetts' Veterans Services Director of the Year in part for his work with the Jimenez family.

== Boston Commissioner of Veterans' Services ==
On September 8, 2011, Urena was named Commissioner of Veterans' Services for the City of Boston by Mayor Thomas Menino. In this position he oversaw this distribution of over $3.8 million a year in benefits to the city's 700-plus veterans.

== Massachusetts Secretary of Veterans' Services ==
On January 5, 2015, Governor-elect Charlie Baker announced that Urena would serve as his Secretary of Veterans' Services. He was sworn in by Baker on January 8, 2015, shortly after the Governor's own inauguration. Urena resigned on June 24, 2020, the day of release of a report into the deaths of veterans from COVID-19 at the Soldiers' Home in Holyoke.

== Personal life ==
Urena resides in East Boston and owns property in Lawrence. In August 2014 he married Jennifer Siegler. He has degrees from Northern Essex Community College, University of Massachusetts Lowell, and University of Massachusetts Boston.
