= USS Thomas G. Kelley =

Guided missile destroyer

History

United States
- Name: Thomas G. Kelley
- Namesake: Thomas G. Kelley
- Awarded: 30 August 2024
- Builder: Bath Iron Works
- Identification: Hull number: DDG-140
- Status: Announced

General characteristics
- Class & type: Arleigh Burke-class destroyer
- Displacement: 9,217 tons (full load)
- Length: 510 ft (160 m)
- Beam: 66 ft (20 m)
- Propulsion: 4 × General Electric LM2500 gas turbines 100,000 shp (75,000 kW)
- Speed: 31 knots (57 km/h; 36 mph)
- Complement: 380 officers and enlisted
- Armament: Guns: 1 × 5-inch (127 mm)/62 Mk 45 Mod 4 (lightweight gun); 1 × 20 mm (0.8 in) Phalanx CIWS; 2 × 25 mm (0.98 in) Mk 38 machine gun system; 4 × 0.50 in (12.7 mm) caliber guns; Missiles: 1 × 32-cell, 1 × 64-cell (96 total cells) Mk 41 vertical launching system (VLS): RIM-66M surface-to-air missile; RIM-156 surface-to-air missile; RIM-174A Standard ERAM; RIM-161 anti-ballistic missile; RIM-162 ESSM (quad-packed); BGM-109 Tomahawk cruise missile; RUM-139 vertical launch ASROC; Torpedoes: 2 × Mark 32 triple torpedo tubes: Mark 46 lightweight torpedo; Mark 50 lightweight torpedo; Mark 54 lightweight torpedo
- Armor: Kevlar-type armor with steel hull. Numerous passive survivability measures.
- Aircraft carried: 2 × MH-60R Seahawk helicopters
- Aviation facilities: Double hangar and helipad

USS Thomas G. Kelley (DDG-140) is the 90th planned Arleigh Burke-class (Flight III) Aegis guided missile destroyer of the United States Navy. She will honor Captain Thomas G. Kelley (USN, Ret.), who as a then-lieutenant serving in Vietnam, was awarded the Medal of Honor "for conspicuous gallantry and intrepidity at the risk of his life above and beyond the call of duty". Kelley served in the Navy for 30 years, and after retirement, went on to become Secretary of the Massachusetts Department of Veterans' Services.

== Construction ==
The keel plate signing ceremony, with the ship's namesake Captain Thomas G. Kelley in attendance, was held at a General Dynamics Bath Iron Works facility in Brunswick, Maine, on 30 August 2024.
