= Harry Mattison =

American photographer

Harry Mattison (born January 27, 1948) is an American photographer born Henry E. Mattison in New York City. In 1978, he photographed the bombing of Estelí, Nicaragua and began working as a photographer for Time magazine. Between 1977 and 1996, Mattison photographed in Central America, Lebanon, and South Africa. His photographs have also appeared in The New York Times, Le Figaro, Paris Match, Der Spiegel, and many other publications. In 1982, he was awarded the Robert Capa Gold Medal for photography. That same year, he published El Salvador: Work of Thirty Photographers, which he co-edited with Susan Meiselas.

Mattison earned a B.A. in Philosophy and Literature at Fordham University in 1971. During college he worked as an assistant to the photographer Richard Avedon. Following graduation, he did research for Ivan Illich in Cuernavaca, Mexico.

He lives in Maryland with his wife, poet Carolyn Forché, and their son, Sean-Christophe. He is a member of the permanent faculty of the Maryland Institute College of Art in Baltimore, Maryland. He has been photographing in the People's Republic of China during the past four years. VITA: Harry Mattison was published in November 2013 by Umbrage Editions, New York.

== Exhibitions ==
- Twenty-year retrospective, 1994, The William Joiner Center for the Study of War and Its Social Consequences, University of Massachusetts Boston.
- Maryland Institute and College of Art, April, 1996.
- Tokyo Fuji Art Museum, 2000
- Tokyo Metropolitan Museum of Photography, 2001
- International Center of Photography, New York "El Salvador: Work of Thirty Photographers,” September 2005.
- 798 Gallery, Beijing, China "Ten International Photographers” July, 2007.
- Harry Ransom Center, University of Texas at Austin, "Inside El Salvador," April 17 - August 3, 2008.

== Awards ==
- Robert Capa Gold Medal, Overseas Press Club, 1982. "Best Foreign Reporting requiring exceptional courage and enterprise.”
- D.C. Council for the Arts Award 1998
- MICA Teaching Awards 2005
- Beijing—An Olympic City in View, Beijing, First Prize 2007.

== Publications ==
Photographs have appeared in the following books:

- The Indelible Image. Photographs of War, 1846 to the Present. (New York: Abrams, 1985)
- El Salvador: Work of Thirty Photographers Edited with Susan Meiselas. Text by Carolyn Forché (New York: Readers and Writers, 1983)
- Day In The Life of Canada (New York: Collins,1984)
- Day In The Life of Australia (New York: Collins,1981)
- War Torn Edited by Susan Vermazen. (New York: Pantheon, 1984)
- El Salvador: The Face of Revolution Edited by Janet Shenck and Robert Armstrong. (Boston: South End Press, 1982)
- Inhumanity and Humanity (Tokyo: Tokyo Fuji Art Museum), 2000. Exhibition catalog.
- Writing Between The Lines: An Anthology of War and Its Social Consequences, edited by Kevin Bowen and Bruce Weigl. (Boston: University of Massachusetts Press, 1997)
- "Learning Mandarin, The Lesson," Cue Magazine, 2008.
