= Thomas G. Kelley =

United States Navy Medal of Honor recipient

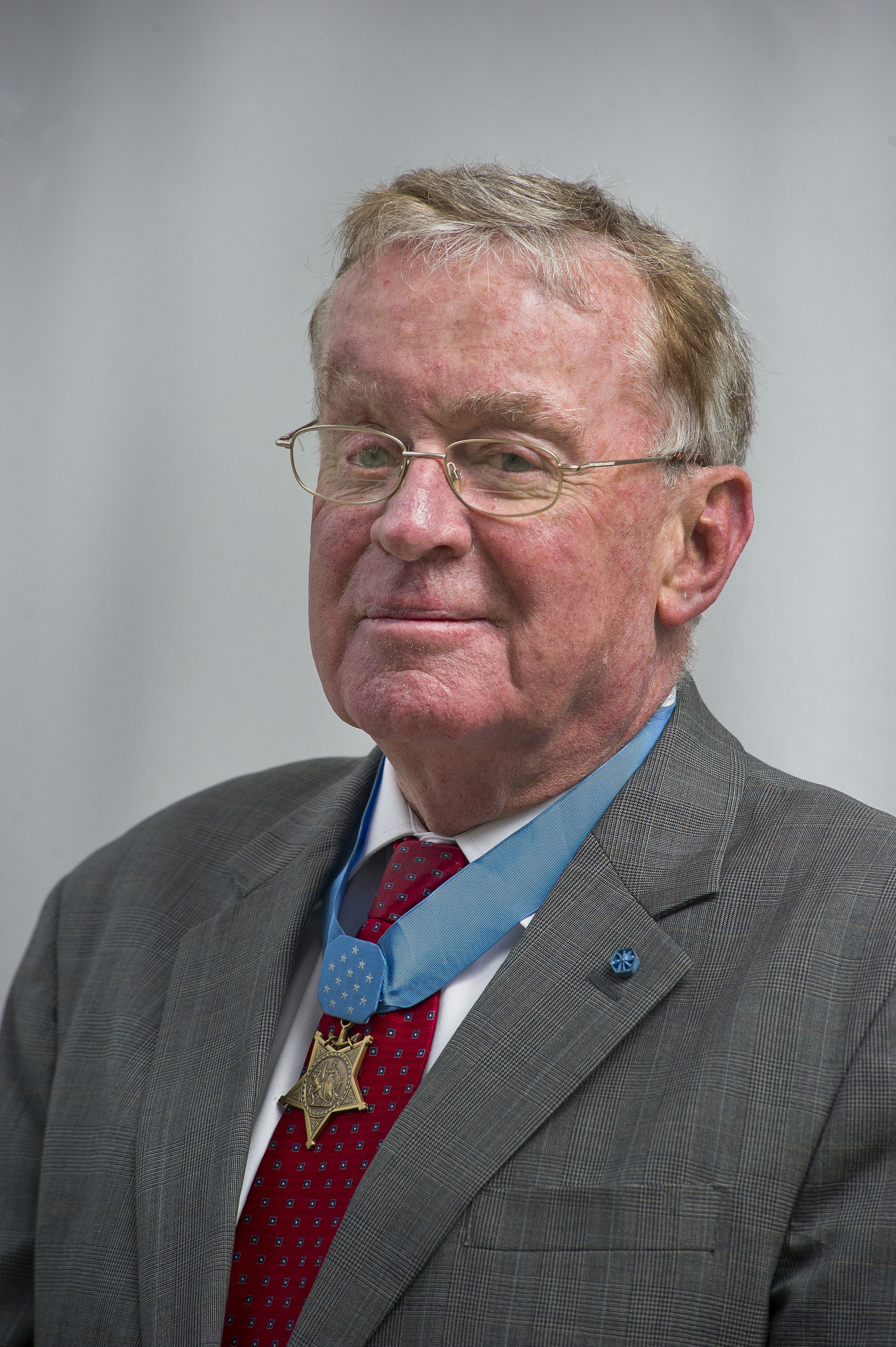
- Kelley in 2011
- Born: May 13, 1939 (age 87); Boston, Massachusetts, U.S.
- Allegiance: United States
- Branch: United States Navy
- Service years: 1960–1990 (30 years)
- Rank: Captain
- Commands: USS Lang; River Assault Division 152; Military Sealift Command Far East
- Conflicts: Vietnam War
- Awards: Medal of Honor; Legion of Merit (3); Purple Heart
- Alma mater: College of the Holy Cross (BA)
- Spouse: Joan O'Connor (m. 2005)

Massachusetts Secretary of the Department of Veterans' Services
- In office 1999–2011
- Preceded by: Thomas J. Hudner Jr.
- Succeeded by: Coleman Nee

Thomas Gunning Kelley (born May 13, 1939) is an American veteran and retired captain in the United States Navy who received the Medal of Honor for his actions during the Vietnam War. From 2003 to 2011 he served as Secretary of the Massachusetts Department of Veterans' Services. He served as the president of the Medal of Honor Society from 2015 to 2017.

== Early life ==
Kelley was born on May 13, 1939, in Boston, Massachusetts. His parents were John Basil Kelley, a school teacher and principal, and Elizabeth Gunning. Brought up in a Roman Catholic family, Kelley attended Boston College High School, a Jesuit school. He then attended the College of the Holy Cross, where he graduated in 1960.

== Military career ==
In June 1960, Kelley joined the United States Navy through the Officer Candidate School program in Newport, Rhode Island. After assignments as a surface warfare officer on USS Pandemus (ARL-18), USS Davis (DD-937) and USS Stickell (DD-888), he volunteered for service in Vietnam as a lieutenant in command of River Assault Division 152, part of the Mobile Riverine Force.

On June 15, 1969, Kelley led eight river assault craft boats on a mission to extract a United States Army infantry company from the bank of the Ong Muong Canal in Kien Hoa Province, South Vietnam. When a boat malfunctioned, he ordered the other craft to circle the disabled boat that had come under attack and placed his boat directly in the line of enemy fire. A rocket-propelled grenade struck nearby, severely injuring Kelley, but he continued to protect his men until they could get to safety, then ordered medical assistance for himself. For this feat he was awarded the Medal of Honor.

Despite the loss of one eye during this action and the Navy's decision that he was no longer fit for service, Kelley persevered in his requests to remain on active duty. Kelley's following seagoing assignments included that of executive officer of USS Sample (DE-1048) and commanding officer of USS Lang (FF-1060), which deployed to the South China Sea in 1978 to rescue refugees from Vietnam, then to the Philippines as well as South Korea. In addition, he earned his master's degree in management at the Naval Postgraduate School in Monterey, California. Later he completed the Armed Forces Staff College course in Norfolk, Virginia, and served in the Office of the Chief of Naval Operations in manpower and planning. In 1982, Kelley was assigned to Yokohama as the commander of the Navy's Military Sealift Command Far East for oversight of its ships' repairs and maintenance. His following assignment was as chief of staff for the commander of United States Naval Forces in Korea. Kelley's final assignment was as the director of legislation in the Bureau of Naval Personnel. There he worked closely with Vice Admiral Mike Boorda to increase the responsibilities and stature of enlisted personnel, while closely integrating minorities and women into mainstream assignments. He retired in 1990 after 30 years of service. His military awards include: Medal of Honor, Legion of Merit (three awards), and Purple Heart.

== Later and current life ==
After his Navy service, Kelley worked as a civilian in the Department of Defense for several years before returning to Boston. He became commissioner of the Massachusetts Department of Veterans' Services in April 1999 and was named Secretary of that department in August 2003. While Secretary, Kelley ran the Commonwealth's veterans' public assistance program, along with educational benefits and annuities for the disabled. After 9/11, as veterans began returning to Massachusetts, Kelley created programs to serve their unique needs, especially those involving the unseen wounds of war, such as Traumatic Brain Injury and suicide prevention. He hired young, disabled veterans to reach out to this new cadre. He also worked with the United States Department of Labor to enforce federal employment protections for returning service men and women.

In January 2011, Kelley retired from public service. His more than 40 years of naval and state service were recognized in a tribute attended by 500 people that also raised $300,000 for the Massachusetts Soldiers' Legacy Fund, which pays the educational expenses for children of those soldiers who died in the War in Afghanistan (2001-2021); U.S. involvement in the Iraq War (2003–2010); and other "war on terror" theaters.

From 2015 to 2017, Kelley served as president of the Medal of Honor Society. He advocated for the living recipients and their spouses and promoted their Character Development Program in middle, high, and now elementary schools. The program draws on examples of courage, commitment, sacrifice and integrity from the recipients' lives. Kelley also provides meals for a homeless shelter and helps run the veterans' ministry at his church. He remains close to Holy Cross and serves on its O'Callahan Society that supports their Naval Reserve Officers Training Corps program. He mentors students at BC High, is an active alumnus, and received their Ignatius Award in 2015. He has served on the Army's Arlington National Cemetery Advisory Committee since 2012. He is on the board of the Homebase Program, a collaboration of the Boston Red Sox Foundation and Massachusetts General Hospital that helps veterans and their families recover from the invisible wounds of war. He was recognized for a Lifetime Achievement Award in 2019 and serves on the board of directors of the USS Constitution Museum.

== Honors and author ==
Kelley received an honorary doctoral degree from the Massachusetts School of Professional Psychology, now the William James College, in 2009 and an honorary Doctor of Laws from Boston University in 2012.

Kelly is a member of the Ancient and Honorable Artillery Company of Massachusetts.

Kelley and his wife Joan, published a military memoir, The Siren's Call and Second Chances, about perseverance, service, courage and love. The book's proceeds go to the Ahern Family Charitable Foundation, which supports returning veterans and their families.

In January 2023, Secretary of the Navy Carlos Del Toro announced that the future Arleigh Burke-class guided missile destroyer USS Thomas G. Kelley (DDG-140) will be named in his honor.

== Personal life ==
Kelley has three daughters, Liza DuVal, Kate Clark and Jane Kelley. Kelley married the former Joan O'Connor in October 2005. She retired from the U.S. Navy Reserve as a commander after 20 years as a public affairs officer. She has a son, Brian O'Connor.

== Medal of Honor citation ==
Kelley's official Medal of Honor citation reads:

For conspicuous gallantry and intrepidity at the risk of his life above and beyond the call of duty in the afternoon while serving as commander of River Assault Division 152 during combat operations against enemy aggressor forces. Lt. Cmdr. (then Lt.) Kelley was in charge of a column of 8 river assault craft which were extracting one company of U.S. Army infantry troops on the east bank of the Ong Muong Canal in Kien Hoa province, when one of the armored troop carriers reported a mechanical failure of a loading ramp. At approximately the same time, Viet Cong forces opened fire from the opposite bank of the canal. After issuing orders for the crippled troop carrier to raise its ramp manually, and for the remaining boats to form a protective cordon around the disabled craft, Lt. Comdr. Kelley realizing the extreme danger to his column and its inability to clear the ambush site until the crippled unit was repaired, boldly maneuvered the monitor in which he was embarked to the exposed side of the protective cordon in direct line with the enemy's fire, and ordered the monitor to commence firing. Suddenly, an enemy rocket scored a direct hit on the coxswain's flat, the shell penetrating the thick armor plate, and the explosion spraying shrapnel in all directions. Sustaining serious head wounds from the blast, which hurled him to the deck of the monitor, Lt. Cmdr. Kelley disregarded his severe injuries and attempted to continue directing the other boats. Although unable to move from the deck or to speak clearly into the radio, he succeeded in relaying his commands through one of his men until the enemy attack was silenced and the boats were able to move to an area of safety. Lt. Comdr. Kelley's brilliant leadership, bold initiative, and resolute determination served to inspire his men and provide the impetus needed to carry out the mission after he was medically evacuated by helicopter. His extraordinary courage under fire, and his selfless devotion to duty sustain and enhance the finest traditions of the U.S. Naval Service.

== See also ==
- List of Medal of Honor recipients for the Vietnam War
