= Community College Humanities Association =

Non-profit association of faculty members

Community College Humanities Association (CCHA)
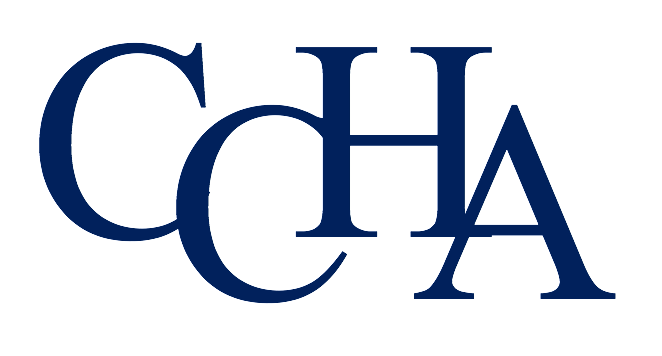
- Formation: 1979
- Type: Non-Profit (Education Association)
- Purpose: Dedicated to preserving and strengthening the humanities in two-year colleges.
- Headquarters: 7201 Rossville Blvd, Baltimore, MD, 21237
- Website: http://www.cchumanities.org

The Community College Humanities Association (CCHA) is a formal, non-profit association of faculty members from the nation's community colleges. The organization seeks to advocate for the humanities in the nation's two year colleges; although, it does also engage in work with four-year institutions, and much of the association's work is done through grants and affiliations with the National Endowment for the Humanities.

== History ==
CCHA was founded in 1979 through the American Association for the Advancement of the Humanities. CCHA held its first conference that year in Summit, New Jersey, culminating in the publication of Challenges Before the Humanities in Community Colleges: Review and Proceedings of the Community College Humanities Association. Through the years, CCHA has been at multiple institutions as the association has never been a "stand-alone" association and has always existed and been supported by a community college campus. Most recently, CCHA was housed at Essex County College in Newark, NJ, until the end of 2015. At the beginning of 2016, CCHA moved to the Community College of Baltimore County (CCBC) and it is currently housed on the Essex campus.

The Community College Humanities Association is also a member of the American Association of Community Colleges (AACC) Affiliated Council.

== Governance ==
CCHA is governed by a board of directors composed of community college presidents and five elected regional presidents. The current chairman of the board is David A. Berry, Professor of Humanities at Essex County College, who won the National Humanities Medal in 1997 for his services to the humanities. In addition, the regular day-to-day work of the organization is overseen by the National Director, Andrew Rusnak, Jr, who is an associate professor of English at the Community College of Baltimore County.

== Organization and conferences ==
The association is broken into five regional divisions. These divisions are the Central, Eastern, Pacific-Western, Southern, and Southwestern. Every other year, each of the divisions holds an annual conference within their geographical division. Additionally, national conferences are held in the years between the regional conferences. All conferences tend to be held near the end of October or beginning of November.

== Publications ==
The organization has two publications. The primary and flagship publication is the Community College Humanities Review, a peer-reviewed journal published bi-annually. The second is the Humanist newsletter, sent out at regular intervals during the academic year. CCHA also publishes shorter pieces to the blog Discourse, which is maintained on their website.

== Awards and prizes ==
Each year, CCHA holds a Literary Magazine Competition, through which the magazines of different institutions compete in multiple categories such as "best artwork" and "best poem." Submissions are generally due near the end of May, and winners are announced in August and recognized at the conference(s).

== Workshops, grant projects, and summer institutes ==
CCHA has a long-standing relationship with the National Endowment for the Humanities, and this relationship has led to the creation and implementation of many workshops and summer institutes for humanities faculty. Examples of recent programs are listed below.

=== 2016 ===
On Native Grounds: Studies of Native American Histories and the Land (cont.)

=== 2015 ===
Transcendentalism and Reform in the Age of Emerson, Thoreau, and Fuller

Slavery in the American Republic: From Constitution to Civil War

On Native Grounds: Studies of Native American Histories and the Land

Funding was also given to the 2015 documentary film Poetry of Witness

=== 2014 ===
Pictorial Histories and Myth-Histories: "Graphic Novels" of the Mixtecs and Aztecs

=== 2013 ===
India's Past And The Making Of The Present

=== 2012 ===
The Legacy of Ancient Italy: The Etruscan and Early Roman City

Advancing the Humanities at Community Colleges: An NEH Bridging Cultures Project

Mesoamerica and the Southwest: A New History for an Ancient Land

Georgia O'Keeffe: Santa Fe, Abiquiu, and the New Mexico Landscape
