= Carolyn Forché =

American poet, editor, professor, translator (born 1950)

- Forché, photographed here with article written about here, in 2026 at the Politics and Prose bookstore in Washington, D.C.
- Born: Carolyn Louise Sidlosky; April 28, 1950 (age 76); Detroit, Michigan, U.S.
- Education: Michigan State University (BA); Bowling Green State University (MFA)
- Occupations: Poet; columnist; essayist; lyricist
- Spouse: Harry Mattison (m. 1984)
- Writing career
- Notable works: Gathering the Tribes (1976); The Country Between Us (1981); What You Have Heard Is True (2019)
- Notable awards: Windham–Campbell Prize

Carolyn Louise Forché (born April 28, 1950) is an American poet, editor, professor, translator, and human rights advocate. She has received many awards for her literary work.

== Biography ==
Forché was born Carolyn Louise Sidlosky in Detroit, Michigan, to Michael Joseph and Louise Nada Blackford Sidlosky. Forché earned a bachelor's degree in Creative Writing at Michigan State University in 1972, and Master of Fine Arts at Bowling Green State University in 1975.

She has taught at a number of universities, including Bowling Green State University, Michigan State University, the University of Virginia, Skidmore College, Columbia University, San Diego State University and in the Master of Fine Arts program at George Mason University.

Forché is a Presidential Fellow at Chapman University, and has received honorary doctorates from the University of Scranton, the California Institute of the Arts, Marquette University, Russell Sage University, and Sierra Nevada College. She was Director of Lannan Center for Poetics and Social Practice, and held the Lannan Visiting Chair in Poetry at Georgetown University, Washington, DC, where she is now a university professor. She is co-chair, with Gloria Steinem, of the Creative Advisory Council of Hedgebrook, a residency for women writers on Whidbey Island.

Forché began publishing under the surname from her first marriage. She lives in Maryland with her husband, Harry Mattison, a photographer, whom she married in 1984. Their son is Sean-Christophe Mattison.

== Career ==
=== Awards and publications ===
Forché's first poetry collection, Gathering the Tribes (1976), won the Yale Series of Younger Poets Competition, leading to publication by Yale University Press. After her 1977 trip to Spain, in which she translated the work of Salvadoran-exiled poet Claribel Alegría as well as the works of Georg Trakl and Mahmoud Darwish, she received a Guggenheim Fellowship, which enabled her to travel to El Salvador, where she worked as a human rights advocate, mentored by Leonel Gómez Vides.

Her second book, The Country Between Us (1981), published with the help of Margaret Atwood, received the Poetry Society of America's Alice Fay di Castagnola Award, and was also the Lamont Poetry Selection of the Academy of American Poets. Forché has held three fellowships from the National Endowment for the Arts, and in 1992 received a Lannan Foundation Literary Fellowship. Additional awards include the Robert Creeley Award, the Windham–Campbell Prize, the Edita and Ira Morris Hiroshima Foundation Award for Peace and Culture, and the Denise Levertov Award.

Forche at the Politics and Prose bookstore in Washington, D.C. (2026)

Her anthology, Against Forgetting: Twentieth-Century Poetry of Witness, was published in 1993, and her third book of poetry, The Angel of History (1994), was chosen for the Los Angeles Times Book Award. Her works include the famed poem The Colonel (The Country Between Us). She is also a trustee for the Griffin Poetry Prize. Her articles and reviews have appeared in The New York Times, The Washington Post, The Nation, Esquire, Mother Jones, Boston Review, and others.

Her fourth book of poems, Blue Hour, was released in 2003. Other books include a memoir, The Horse on Our Balcony (2010, HarperCollins); a book of essays (2011, HarperCollins); a memoir about her time in El Salvador, What You Have Heard Is True (2019, Penguin Press); and a fifth collection of poems, In the Lateness of the World (Bloodaxe Books, 2020).

In October 2019, What You Have Heard is True was named a finalist for the National Book Award for Nonfiction., the book also won the 2019 Juan E. Méndez Book Award for Human Rights in Latin America.

In 2024, she was elected as a Royal Society of Literature International Writer.

=== Readings and translations ===
Among her translations are Mahmoud Darwish's Unfortunately, It Was Paradise: Selected Poems (2003), Claribel Alegría's Sorrow (1999), and Robert Desnos's Selected Poetry (with William Kulik, for the Modern English Poetry Series, 1991).

Forché has given poetry readings in France, Spain, Germany, Italy, Russia, Czech Republic, Slovakia, Bulgaria, Romania, Lithuania, Belarus, Finland, Sweden, Republic of South Africa, Zimbabwe, Libya, Japan, Colombia, Mexico and Canada. Her poetry books have been translated into Swedish, German and Spanish. Individual poems have been translated into more than twenty other languages.

=== Writing perspective ===
Although Forché is sometimes described as a political poet, she considers herself a poet who is politically engaged. After the publication of her second book, The Country Between Us, which included poems describing what she had personally experienced in El Salvador at the beginning of the Salvadoran Civil War, she responded to controversy concerning whether or not her work had become “political,” by researching and writing about poetry written in the aftermath of extremity in the 20th century. She proposed that such works not be read as narrowly “political” but rather as “poetry of witness." Her own aesthetic is more one of rendered experienced and at times of mysticism rather than one of ideology or agitprop.

Forché is particularly interested in the effect of political trauma on the poet's use of language. The anthology Against Forgetting was intended to collect the work of poets who had endured the impress of extremity during the 20th century, whether through their engagements or force of circumstance. These experiences included warfare, military occupation, imprisonment, torture, forced exile, censorship, and house arrest. The anthology, composed of the work of one hundred and forty-five poets writing in English and translated from over thirty languages, begins with the Armenian Genocide and ends with the uprising of the pro-Democracy movement at Tiananmen Square. Although she was not guided in her selections by the political or ideological persuasions of the poets, Forché believes the sharing of painful experience to be radicalizing, returning the poet to an emphasis on community rather than the individual ego. In this she was influenced by Terrence des Pres, Hannah Arendt, Martin Buber, Simone Weil and Emmanuel Levinas.

Forché is also influenced by her Slovak family background, particularly the life story of her grandmother, an immigrant whose family included a woman resistance fighter imprisoned during the Nazi occupation of former Czechoslovakia. Forché was raised Roman Catholic and religious themes are frequent in her work.

== In other media ==
Forché appeared in the Ken Burns Oscar-nominated documentary The Statue of Liberty in 1985.

In November 2013, Forché was interviewed as both scholar and poet for the documentary Poetry of Witness, directed by independent filmmakers Billy Tooma and Anthony Cirilo.

In 2022, the album The Blue Hour was released, based on lyrics from the poem On Earth from the collection Blue Hour: Poems. The song cycle was commissioned by the Boston chamber orchestra A Far Cry and the music was composed by five female composers: Rachel Grimes, Angélica Negrón, Shara Nova, Caroline Shaw and Sarah Kirkland Snider.

== Bibliography ==
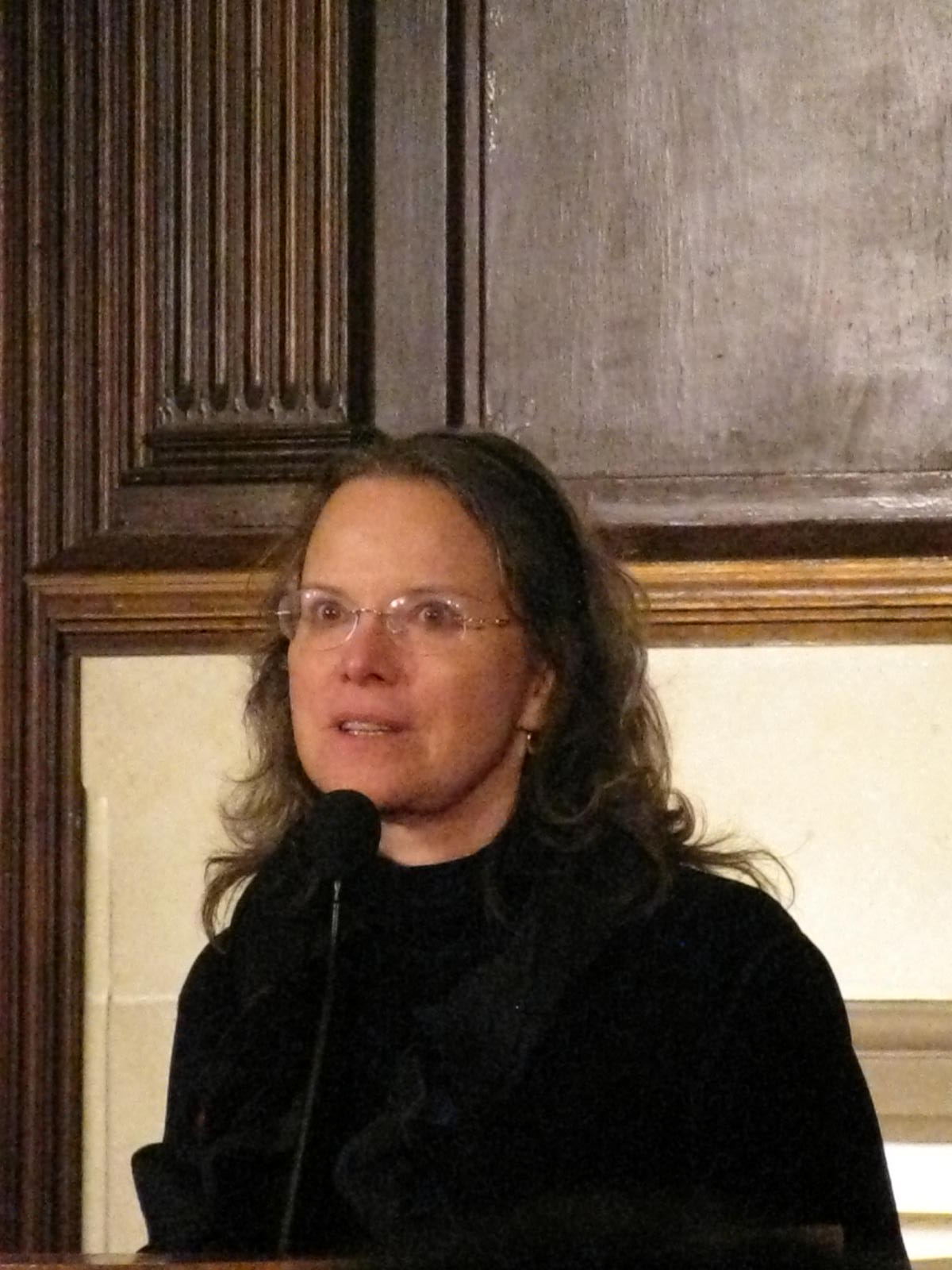
Forché at Georgetown University in 2012

=== Published books ===
- Women in American Labor History, 1825-1935: An Annotated Bibliography (Michigan State University, 1972), with Martha Jane Soltow and Murray Massre
- Gathering the Tribes (Yale University Press, 1976), ISBN 0-300-01983-1
- History and Motivations of U.S. Involvement in the Control of the Peasant Movement in El Salvador: The Role of AIFLD in the Agrarian Reform Process, 1970-1980 (EPICA, 1980), with Philip Wheaton
- The Country Between Us (Harper & Row, USA, 1981, ISBN 0-06-014955-8; Bloodaxe Books, UK, 2019 ISBN 978-1-78037-374-4)
- El Salvador: Work of Thirty Photographers (W.W. Norton, 1983), ISBN 0-86316-063-8
- Against Forgetting: Twentieth-Century Poetry of Witness (W.W. Norton, 1993), ISBN 0-393-03372-4 (ed.)
- The Angel of History (HarperCollins, USA, 1994 ISBN 0-06-017078-6; Bloodaxe Books, UK, 1994 ISBN 978-1-85224-307-4)
- Writing Creative nonfiction: Instruction and Insights from Teachers of the Associated Writing Programs (Story Press, 2001), ISBN 1-884910-50-5 (ed. with Philip Gerard)
- Blue Hour (HarperCollins, USA, 2003; Bloodaxe Books, UK, 2003 ISBN 978-1-85224-618-1)
- Poetry of Witness: The Tradition in English, 1500-2001, (W.W. Norton & Co., 2014)
- What You Have Heard Is True: A Memoir of Witness and Resistance (Penguin Press, 2019)
- In The Lateness of The World: Poems (Penguin Press, USA, 2020; Bloodaxe Books, UK, 2020 ISBN 978-1-85224-964-9)
