= Poetry of Witness =

- Directed by: Billy Tooma; Anthony Cirilo
- Starring: Carolyn Forché; Saghi Ghahraman; Fady Joudah; Neil J. Kressel; Claudia Serea; Mario Susko; Bruce Weigl; Duncan Wu
- Music by: Will Lewis
- Production company: Icon Independent Films
- Release date: October 16, 2015 (Buffalo)
- Running time: 60 minutes
- Country: United States
- Language: English

Poetry of Witness is a 2015 documentary film directed by Billy Tooma and Anthony Cirilo about the lives of six contemporary poets who have lived through, and survived, extremities such as war, torture, exile, and repression, using poetry to preserve their memories. It debuted October 16, 2015 at the Buffalo International Film Festival.

== Synopsis ==
The film documents the struggle of six contemporary poets who have faced the duress of war, exile, and human rights violations to give voice to their experiences while wrestling with the complex moral quandaries of artistic production, memory, and trauma. The poets: Carolyn Forché (Salvadoran Civil War), Saghi Ghahraman (Iranian Revolution), Fady Joudah (Doctors Without Borders), Claudia Serea (Socialist Republic of Romania), Mario Susko (Bosnian War), and Bruce Weigl (Vietnam War) offer first-person accounts of how their experiences as soldier, activist, doctor, and survivor imprint their poetry as evidence of those conflicts, rather than as representations of them.

Along the way, the poets read from their work and all poems are accompanied by original artwork by Jimmy Buitrago, as well as a musical score by Will Lewis. Duncan Wu (Georgetown University) and Neil J. Kressel (William Paterson University) help to contextualize these discussions throughout with historical and psychoanalytic perspectives.

The film can be seen as an extension of the decades-long work Forché has conducted in the subject, beginning with her anthology Against Forgetting: Twentieth Century Poetry of Witness (1993). Coinciding with the publication of a new anthology (co-edited by Forché and Wu), Poetry of Witness: The Tradition in English, 1500–2001 (2014), this documentary aims to bring this work to a wider audience.
