= Expansion of the NBA =

Periods when the NBA has been expanded

Since beginning with 11 teams in 1946, the National Basketball Association (NBA) expanded several times before reaching its current 30 teams. The most recent additions were the Charlotte Hornets and Miami Heat (1988), the Minnesota Timberwolves and Orlando Magic (1989), the Toronto Raptors and Vancouver Grizzlies (1995; the latter relocated to Memphis in 2001), and the New Orleans Hornets (2002; now called the Pelicans).

On March 25, 2026, the NBA Board of Governors authorized the league to explore potential expansion franchises in Seattle and Las Vegas, targeted to begin play in the 2028–29 season.

Progression of NBA expansion
Years	No. of teams
1946–1947	11
1947–1948	8
1948–1949	12
1949–1950	17
1950–1951	11
1951–1953	10
1953–1955	9
1955–1961	8
1961–1966	9
1966–1967	10
1967–1968	12
1968–1970	14
1970–1974	17
1974–1976	18
1976–1980	22
1980–1988	23
1988–1989	25
1989–1995	27
1995–2004	29
2004–present	30

== Early years (1946–1966) ==
There was a lot of expansion and moving of organizations in the early years of the NBA. During this 20-year time period is when notable franchises entered the NBA like the Syracuse Nationals (now the Philadelphia 76ers), the Philadelphia Warriors (now the Golden State Warriors), Minneapolis Lakers (now the Los Angeles Lakers), Tri-Cities Blackhawks (now the Atlanta Hawks), and Rochester Royals (now the Sacramento Kings).

The league experienced its first substantial growth, although short-lived, as the league was back down to eight teams by 1955 after peaking to 17 teams in 1949–50.

== Expansion era (1966–1980) ==
During a span of 15 years, 14 of the 30 current teams were brought into the league, beginning with the Chicago Bulls in 1966. The San Diego Rockets (now Houston Rockets) and Seattle SuperSonics (now Oklahoma City Thunder) joined one year later, with the Phoenix Suns and Milwaukee Bucks following them in 1968. After two more seasons, in 1970, the Buffalo Braves (later San Diego Clippers, now Los Angeles Clippers), Cleveland Cavaliers, and Portland Trail Blazers all began play. The New Orleans Jazz (now Utah Jazz) became the league's 18th franchise in 1974.

Following the 1975–76 season, the NBA merged with the American Basketball Association, a competing league that had operated for nine seasons beginning in 1967. With the ABA–NBA merger, four ABA teams became members of the NBA: the Denver Nuggets, Indiana Pacers, New York Nets (became New Jersey Nets, now Brooklyn Nets) and the San Antonio Spurs. In 1980, the Dallas Mavericks were created as the league's 23rd member.

== Modern expansion (1988–2004) ==
The NBA has added seven more franchises from 1988 to present, the latest in 2004. Four teams were created in 1988 and 1989: the Charlotte Hornets, the Miami Heat and Orlando Magic, both in Florida, and the Minnesota Timberwolves. In 1995 the NBA created two new teams in Canada: the Toronto Raptors and Vancouver Grizzlies (who have since moved to Tennessee and are now the Memphis Grizzlies). The Raptors and Grizzlies were the first two Canadian teams since the now-defunct Toronto Huskies in the inaugural 1946–47 season. The league expanded to 30 with the Charlotte Bobcats in 2004, following the 2002 relocation of the Charlotte Hornets to New Orleans. In 2014, the Bobcats rebranded to and acquired the history of the Charlotte Hornets, with the New Orleans Pelicans being retroactively recognized as a new franchise established in 2002.

== Future expansion (2028–2029) ==
On September 17, 2024, in the midst of rumors of the NBA potentially exploring expansion, ESPN reported on how the league had been exploring the idea of expanding once more since 2020 and that there had been many factors pointing to that idea of doing so in the upcoming future.

On December 18, 2025, NBA commissioner Adam Silver said that a decision would be made in 2026 on whether to proceed with expansion, with Seattle and Las Vegas being the top markets to be considered.

During meetings on March 24 and 25, 2026, the league's Board of Governors unanimously voted to explore adding expansion teams in Seattle and Las Vegas. The approval paves the path for the possible revival of the Seattle SuperSonics, which would result in the Oklahoma City Thunder ceding the SuperSonics' history back to Seattle. The Thunder have retained the rights to the SuperSonics' banners, trophies, retired jerseys, nickname, logo, and color scheme since the SuperSonics' move to Oklahoma City in 2008, which would be made available to any subsequent NBA team that plays in Seattle, subject to NBA approval. The potential of adding a brand-new team in Las Vegas, long rumored to be a destination for a future NBA franchise, is due to the city hosting the annual NBA Summer League, where all teams have participated since 2018, and the NBA Cup semifinal and championship games. Both teams are targeted to begin play in the 2028–29 season. Despite reports that the process was slowing down, the NBA stated that the process to finalize the expansion process would be completed by the end of 2026 with the target dates still on track, and later confirmed they hoped to make a decision by the same deadline.

=== Seattle ===
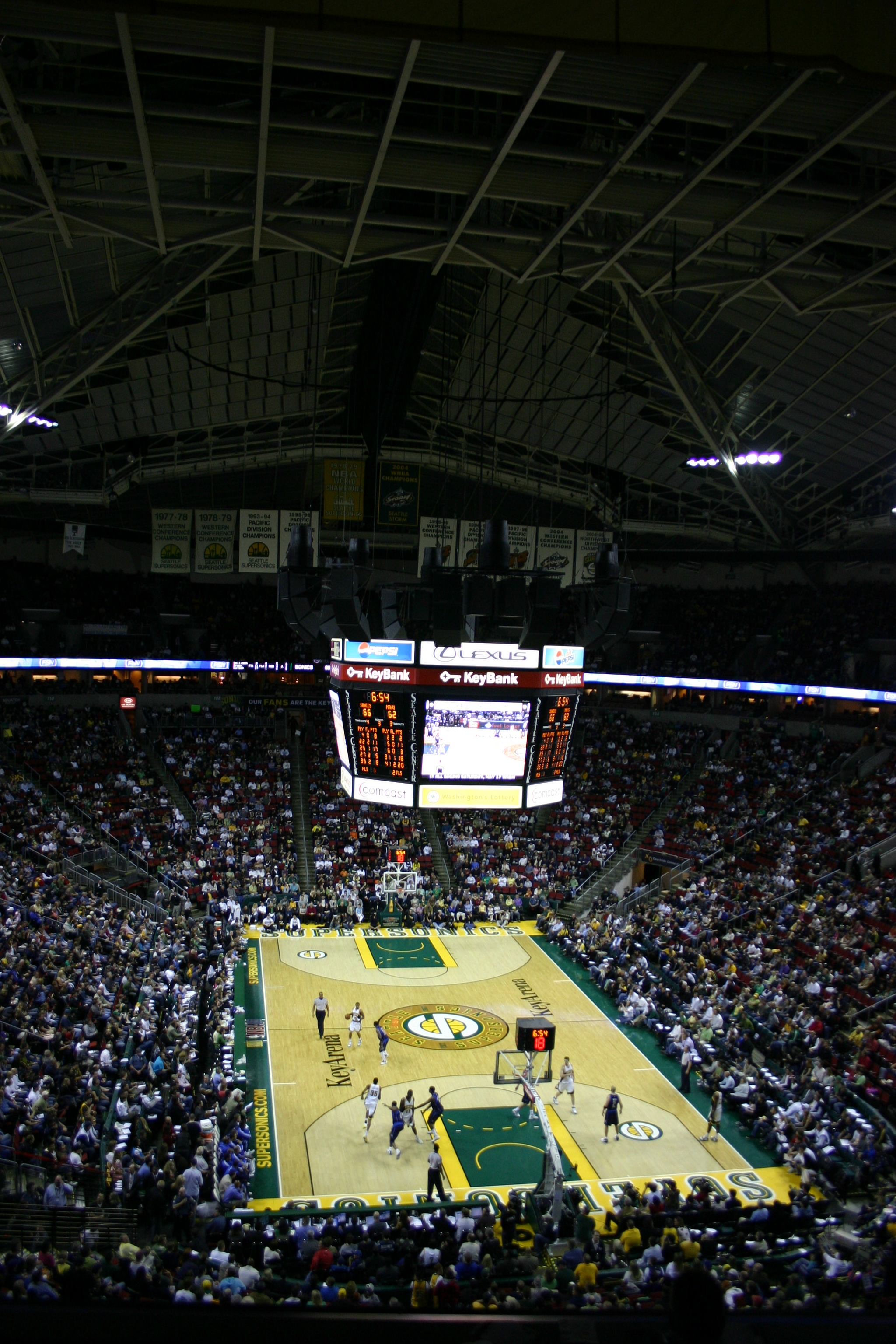
KeyArena during the Seattle SuperSonics' last home game in 2008 prior to the club's relocation to Oklahoma City

Seattle is both the most populous metropolitan area and the second largest American media market (behind Tampa–St. Petersburg–Sarasota) without an NBA franchise. The city hosted the Seattle SuperSonics from the 1967–68 season until the 2007–08 season, after which the team was relocated to Oklahoma City, due to team and Seattle officials being unable to come to an agreement to build a new arena. With the potential expansion to Seattle, the history of the SuperSonics would be acquired by the revived team while the Oklahoma City Thunder would be retroactively recognized as a new franchise established in 2008.

On December 3, 2018, the redevelopment of what was once KeyArena into Climate Pledge Arena began, both to provide an arena up to current NBA standards and in preparation for the then-upcoming National Hockey League (NHL) expansion franchise, the Seattle Kraken, which began play in 2021. Following its opening, the new arena hosted a notably successful annual preseason NBA game known as the "Rain City Showcase" from 2022-2024. On March 23, 2026, Samantha Holloway, the leader of the Kraken ownership group, created One Roof Sports and Entertainment (ORSE), an umbrella company to manage the group's teams and venue holdings, in anticipation of NBA expansion. As previously agreed, ORSE assumed a majority stake in Climate Pledge Arena from arena developer Oak View Group (OVG) to support NBA team management. On the same day, a video conference call between Washington governor Bob Ferguson and NBA commissioner Adam Silver occurred regarding the return of the SuperSonics. In May 2026, Holloway hired JPMorgan Chase and Moelis & Company as advisors on the expansion process. In June 2026, Melinda French Gates joined ORSE to help in the group's expansion bid. That same month, the city approved a resolution for a revitalization of Seattle Center in 2027 as part of efforts to bring back the SuperSonics.

In September 2026, Silver revealed that NBA operational groups had toured Climate Pledge Arena and determined it could be ready for NBA play in as quick as five weeks. That same month, an $8.1 billion rival bid submitted to the NBA – backed by private equity company BlackSun, the Tulalip Tribes (via Native World Sports), and other regional leader – proposed building an arena on tribal land in nearby Marysville, about 40 miles from downtown Seattle. In November 2026, the governor of Washington once again met with Silver to discuss the return of the SuperSonics, and that same month, it was reported that Holloway was getting more serious with her efforts to bring the SuperSonics back while Amazon CEO and ORSE investor Andy Jassy and said he was confident the SuperSonics would return.

In addition to the expansion Kraken, Seattle also hosts the Seattle Seahawks of the National Football League (NFL), Seattle Mariners of Major League Baseball (MLB), Seattle Sounders FC of Major League Soccer (MLS), Seattle Seawolves of Major League Rugby (MLR), Seattle Storm of the Women's National Basketball Association (WNBA), Seattle Reign FC of the National Women's Soccer League (NWSL), and Seattle Torrent of the Professional Women's Hockey League (PWHL).

=== Las Vegas ===
Las Vegas hosts the annual NBA Summer League, in which all teams have participated since 2018, and the NBA Cup semifinal and championship games. In 2001, Las Vegas was included in the list of cities the Vancouver Grizzlies were considering relocating to, before the team ultimately chose to move to Memphis, Tennessee, to become the Memphis Grizzlies.

The 2007 NBA All-Star Game took place in the city at the Thomas & Mack Center on the campus of the University of Nevada, Las Vegas. The arena is home to the UNLV Runnin' Rebels team of NCAA Division I's Mountain West Conference (MWC).

T-Mobile Arena, opened in 2016 and home of the NHL's Vegas Golden Knights, has been suggested as a potential destination for a future franchise in the city. Las Vegas mayor Carolyn Goodman was a vocal supporter of landing an NBA team for the city, including personally contacting NBA commissioner Adam Silver in early 2021. The arena has hosted part of the NBA Cup in 2023, 2024, and 2025.

In 2022, LeBron James expressed interest in owning an NBA team, specifically one located in Las Vegas; however, by 2026 he stated he was no longer interested in owning the Vegas team. In March 2026, it was reported that Magic Johnson and the MAGI group met with Nevada Governor Joe Lombardo to discuss an expansion team in the city, including a possible new arena and resort to house the team. Golden Knights owner Bill Foley has also expressed interest in joining the ownership group of the Vegas NBA team. In June 2026, Foley announced a bid to acquire an NBA franchise for Las Vegas. In July 2026, Bill Laurie and his wife Nancy Walton Laurie announced a second bid to acquire an NBA franchise for Las Vegas. Other interested ownership groups include the "Las Vegas Jacks" led by former Phoenix Suns owner Jerry Colangelo, former NBA coach Vinny Del Negro, former Turner Broadcasting System CEO David Levy, American Century Investments CEO Jonathan Thomas, analyst Jay Williams, and Scott Colangelo, another group led by former Disney CEO Bob Iger and businessman Joshua Kushner prior to their purchase of the Los Angeles Lakers in August 2026, and rumored bids from Shaquille O'Neal as well as former Milwaukee Bucks owner Marc Lasry and interest from UFC CEO Dana White. In September 2026, the bidding parties were narrowed down to three groups: a joint bid by the Lauries and Egon Durban; a joint bid by Steve Apostolopoulos and Marc Lasry; and a joint bid by Foley and Colangelo with Apostolopoulos and Lasry dropping out in October 2026. In November 2026, it was reported that Foley's group intended to renovate T-Mobile Arena to make it NBA ready.

A competing arena bid to house the Las Vegas NBA team dubbed "Las Vegas Diamond Arena" was announced in April 2026. It would be a 21,212-seat arena located directly across from Mandalay Bay and be in close proximity to Harry Reid International Airport as well as I-15 and I-215. Another competing arena backed by the Fisher Brothers was announced in October 2026 which would be located at Area15.

In addition to the Golden Knights, who began play in 2017, Las Vegas also hosts the NFL's Las Vegas Raiders, who relocated from Oakland to the city in 2020, the WNBA's Las Vegas Aces, who relocated from San Antonio to the city in 2018, and the PWHL's Vegas Vanguards who began play in 2026. MLB's Athletics are due to begin playing in a new stadium in Las Vegas in 2028.

== Expansion drafts ==
There have been 11 expansion drafts in NBA history. An additional four of the league's current teams joined via the 1976 ABA–NBA merger. Assuming the league fully approves expansion in Seattle and Las Vegas in 2028, the league will host its 12th expansion draft ahead of the 2028 NBA draft, after which is when both teams will begin play in the subsequent 2028–29 season.

Year	New teams	Team(s)	Total teams after draft
1961	1	Chicago Packers (now Washington Wizards)	9
1966	1	Chicago Bulls	10
1967	2	San Diego Rockets (now Houston Rockets), Seattle SuperSonics (now Oklahoma City Thunder)	12
1968	2	Milwaukee Bucks, Phoenix Suns	14
1970	3	Buffalo Braves (now Los Angeles Clippers), Cleveland Cavaliers, Portland Trail Blazers	17
1974	1	New Orleans Jazz (now Utah Jazz)	18
1976 merger with ABA	4	Denver Nuggets, Indiana Pacers, New York Nets (now Brooklyn Nets), San Antonio Spurs	22
1980	1	Dallas Mavericks	23
1988	2	Charlotte Hornets, Miami Heat	25
1989	2	Minnesota Timberwolves, Orlando Magic	27
1995	2	Toronto Raptors, Vancouver Grizzlies (now Memphis Grizzlies)	29
2004	1	Charlotte Bobcats (now Charlotte Hornets)	30

== Teams ==
The NBA originated in 1946 with 11 teams, and through a sequence of team expansions, contractions, and relocations consists of 30 teams. The United States is home to 29 teams and one is located in Canada.

The following table shows current NBA teams that are participating in the 2025–26 NBA season, in which city they are located, when the club was founded, joined the NBA, number of times relocated and times the franchise name has changed.

=== Current ===
Team	Location	Founded	Joined	Relocated	Name changed
Atlanta Hawks	Atlanta, Georgia	1946	1949	3	1
Boston Celtics	Boston, Massachusetts	1946	1946	0	0
Brooklyn Nets	Brooklyn, New York	1967	1976	0	1
Charlotte Hornets	Charlotte, North Carolina	1988, 2004^{1}	1988, 2004^{1}	0	1
Chicago Bulls	Chicago, Illinois	1966	1966	0	0
Cleveland Cavaliers	Cleveland, Ohio	1970	1970	0	0
Dallas Mavericks	Dallas, Texas	1980	1980	0	0
Denver Nuggets	Denver, Colorado	1967	1976	0	0
Detroit Pistons	Detroit, Michigan	1941	1948	1	1
Golden State Warriors	San Francisco, California	1946	1946	1	0
Houston Rockets	Houston, Texas	1967	1967	1	0
Indiana Pacers	Indianapolis, Indiana	1967	1976	0	0
Los Angeles Clippers	Inglewood, California	1970	1970	2	1
Los Angeles Lakers	Los Angeles, California	1947	1948	1	0
Memphis Grizzlies	Memphis, Tennessee	1995	1995	1	0
Miami Heat	Miami, Florida	1988	1988	0	0
Milwaukee Bucks	Milwaukee, Wisconsin	1968	1968	0	0
Minnesota Timberwolves	Minneapolis, Minnesota	1989	1989	0	0
New Orleans Pelicans	New Orleans, Louisiana	2002	2002	1^{2}	1
New York Knicks	New York City, New York	1946	1946	0	0
Oklahoma City Thunder	Oklahoma City, Oklahoma	1967^{3}	1967^{3}	1	1
Orlando Magic	Orlando, Florida	1989	1989	0	0
Philadelphia 76ers	Philadelphia, Pennsylvania	1946	1949	1	1
Phoenix Suns	Phoenix, Arizona	1968	1968	0	0
Portland Trail Blazers	Portland, Oregon	1970	1970	0	0
Sacramento Kings	Sacramento, California	1923	1949	3	1
San Antonio Spurs	San Antonio, Texas	1967	1976	0	0
Toronto Raptors	Toronto, Ontario	1995	1995	1^{4}	0
Utah Jazz	Salt Lake City, Utah	1974	1974	1	0
Washington Wizards	Washington, D.C.	1961	1961	2	3

Notes:

1. The Charlotte Hornets are regarded as a continuation of the original Charlotte franchise. Because of this, the New Orleans Pelicans are no longer the same franchise as the original Charlotte Hornets. The New Orleans Pelicans were established in 2002. The Charlotte Hornets rejoined the league in 2004, and were known as the Bobcats from 2004 to 2014.
2. Spent two seasons as Oklahoma City/New Orleans Hornets due to Hurricane Katrina.
3. The Thunder market the team as being established in 2008 following the move of the Seattle SuperSonics to Oklahoma City and rebranding.
4. Spent one season in Tampa Bay due to the COVID-19 pandemic.

=== Former ===
Team	Location	Founded	Entered NBA	Years active	Left NBA	Reason
Anderson Packers	Anderson, Indiana	1946	1949	1	1950	Small market
Baltimore Bullets	Baltimore, Maryland	1944	1947	8	1954	—
Chicago Stags	Chicago, Illinois	1946	1946	4	1950	—
Cleveland Rebels	Cleveland, Ohio	1946	1946	1	1947	—
Denver Nuggets	Denver, Colorado	1932	1949	1	1950	—

== See also ==
- List of defunct NBA teams
- List of relocated NBA teams
