= Timeline of the NBA =

The following is a timeline of the organizational changes in the National Basketball Association (NBA), including contractions, expansions, relocations, and divisional realignment. The league was formed as the Basketball Association of America (BAA) in 1946 and took its current name in 1949, when it merged with the National Basketball League (NBL). The histories of NBA franchises that were also members of the American Basketball League (ABL), NBL, National Pro Basketball League (NPBL), and American Basketball Association (ABA) are also included.

== 1946–1949: BAA years ==
=== 1946: Founding of the BAA ===
- The Basketball Association of America (BAA) was established with 11 teams (divided into Eastern and Western Divisions).

Team folded after this season †

1946–47 BAA teams
Eastern	Western
Boston Celtics	Chicago Stags
New York Knicks	Cleveland Rebels†
Philadelphia Warriors	Detroit Falcons†
Providence Steamrollers	Pittsburgh Ironmen†
Toronto Huskies†	St. Louis Bombers
Washington Capitols	

=== 1947 ===
- The Cleveland Rebels, Detroit Falcons, Pittsburgh Ironmen, and Toronto Huskies folded.
- The Baltimore Bullets joined from the ABL and were placed in the Western Division.
- The Washington Capitols moved to the Western Division.

First season in BAA *

1947–48 BAA teams
Eastern	Western
Boston Celtics	Baltimore Bullets*
New York Knicks	Chicago Stags
Philadelphia Warriors	St. Louis Bombers
Providence Steamrollers	Washington Capitols

=== 1948 ===
- The Fort Wayne Pistons, Indianapolis Jets, Minneapolis Lakers, and Rochester Royals all joined from the NBL and were placed in the Western Division.
- The Washington Capitols moved back to the Eastern Division.
- The Baltimore Bullets moved to the Eastern Division.

First season in BAA *
Only season in the league §
Folded after this season †

1948–49 BAA teams
Eastern	Western
Baltimore Bullets	Chicago Stags
Boston Celtics	Fort Wayne Pistons*
New York Knicks	Indianapolis Jets§
Philadelphia Warriors	Minneapolis Lakers*
Providence Steamrollers†	Rochester Royals*
Washington Capitols	St. Louis Bombers

== 1949–1966: BAA–NBL merger ==
=== 1949: BAA–NBL merger ===
- The Indianapolis Jets and Providence Steamrollers folded.
- The BAA merged with the NBL to form the NBA.
- The BAA teams from the Western Division were moved to a newly created Central Division.
- The Anderson Packers, Denver Nuggets, Sheboygan Red Skins, Syracuse Nationals, Tri-Cities Blackhawks, and Waterloo Hawks joined from the NBL. All were placed in the Western Division, except the Nationals, who were placed in the Eastern Division.
- The Indianapolis Olympians joined as an expansion team and were placed in the Western Division.

Team merged from NBL ^
First season in NBA *
Folded after this season †
Team merged from the NBL, but then jumped to the NPBL after this season §
Team merged from the NBL, but then folded after this season ^†

1949–50 NBA teams
Eastern	Central	Western
Baltimore Bullets	Chicago Stags†	Anderson Packers§
Boston Celtics	Fort Wayne Pistons	Denver Nuggets^†
New York Knicks	Minneapolis Lakers	Indianapolis Olympians*
Philadelphia Warriors	Rochester Royals	Sheboygan Red Skins§
Syracuse Nationals^	St. Louis Bombers†	Tri-Cities Blackhawks^
Washington Capitols		Waterloo Hawks§

=== 1950 contraction ===
- The Chicago Stags, Denver Nuggets, and St. Louis Bombers folded.
- The Anderson Packers, Sheboygan Red Skins, and Waterloo Hawks transferred to the NPBL.
- The Pistons, Lakers, and Royals moved back to the Western Division and the Central Division was eliminated.
- The Washington Capitols folded mid-season.

Folded midway through this season †

1950–51 NBA teams
Eastern	Western
Baltimore Bullets	Fort Wayne Pistons
Boston Celtics	Indianapolis Olympians
New York Knicks	Minneapolis Lakers
Philadelphia Warriors	Rochester Royals
Syracuse Nationals	Tri-Cities Blackhawks
Washington Capitols†	

=== 1951: Hawks relocate to Milwaukee ===
- The Tri-Cities Blackhawks relocated to Milwaukee to become the Milwaukee Hawks.

Folded after the 1952–53 season †

1951–52 to 1952–53 NBA teams
Eastern	Western
Baltimore Bullets	Fort Wayne Pistons
Boston Celtics	Indianapolis Olympians†
New York Knicks	Milwaukee Hawks
Philadelphia Warriors	Minneapolis Lakers
Syracuse Nationals	Rochester Royals

=== 1953 and 1954 contraction ===
- The Indianapolis Olympians folded.
- The Baltimore Bullets folded after 14 games into the 1954–55 season.

Folded midway through the 1954–55 season †

1953–54 to 1954–55 NBA teams
Eastern	Western
Baltimore Bullets†	Fort Wayne Pistons
Boston Celtics	Milwaukee Hawks
New York Knicks	Minneapolis Lakers
Philadelphia Warriors	Rochester Royals
Syracuse Nationals	

=== 1955: Hawks relocate to St. Louis ===
- The Milwaukee Hawks relocated to St. Louis to become the St. Louis Hawks.

1955–56 to 1956–57 NBA teams
Eastern	Western
Boston Celtics	Fort Wayne Pistons
New York Knicks	Minneapolis Lakers
Philadelphia Warriors	Rochester Royals
Syracuse Nationals	St. Louis Hawks

=== 1957: Pistons and Royals relocate ===
- The Fort Wayne Pistons relocated to Detroit to become the Detroit Pistons.
- The Rochester Royals relocated to Cincinnati to become the Cincinnati Royals.

1957–58 to 1959–60 NBA teams
Eastern	Western
Boston Celtics	Cincinnati Royals
New York Knicks	Detroit Pistons
Philadelphia Warriors	Minneapolis Lakers
Syracuse Nationals	St. Louis Hawks

=== 1960: Lakers relocate to Los Angeles ===
- The Minneapolis Lakers relocated to Los Angeles to become the Los Angeles Lakers.

1960–61 NBA teams
Eastern	Western
Boston Celtics	Cincinnati Royals
New York Knicks	Detroit Pistons
Philadelphia Warriors	Los Angeles Lakers
Syracuse Nationals	St. Louis Hawks

=== 1961 expansion ===
- The Chicago Packers joined as an expansion team and were placed in the Western Division.

First season in NBA *

1961–62 NBA teams
Eastern	Western
Boston Celtics	Chicago Packers*
New York Knicks	Cincinnati Royals
Philadelphia Warriors	Detroit Pistons
Syracuse Nationals	Los Angeles Lakers
	St. Louis Hawks

=== 1962: Warriors relocate and Chicago rebrands ===
- The Philadelphia Warriors relocated to San Francisco to become the San Francisco Warriors and moved to the Western Division.
- The Cincinnati Royals moved to the Eastern Division.
- The Chicago Packers renamed the Chicago Zephyrs.

1962–63 NBA teams
Eastern	Western
Boston Celtics	Chicago Zephyrs
Cincinnati Royals	Detroit Pistons
New York Knicks	Los Angeles Lakers
Syracuse Nationals	San Francisco Warriors
	St. Louis Hawks

=== 1963: Zephyrs and Nationals relocate ===
- The Chicago Zephyrs relocated to Baltimore and renamed the Baltimore Bullets.
- The Syracuse Nationals relocated to Philadelphia and renamed the Philadelphia 76ers.

1963–64 to 1965–66 NBA teams
Eastern	Western
Boston Celtics	Baltimore Bullets
Cincinnati Royals	Detroit Pistons
New York Knicks	Los Angeles Lakers
Philadelphia 76ers	San Francisco Warriors
	St. Louis Hawks

== 1966–1976: Expansion era ==
=== 1966 expansion ===
- The Chicago Bulls joined as an expansion team and were placed in the Western Division.
- The Baltimore Bullets moved to the Eastern Division.

First season in NBA *

1966–67 NBA teams
Eastern	Western
Baltimore Bullets	Chicago Bulls*
Boston Celtics	Detroit Pistons
Cincinnati Royals	Los Angeles Lakers
New York Knicks	San Francisco Warriors
Philadelphia 76ers	St. Louis Hawks

=== 1967 expansion ===
- The San Diego Rockets and Seattle SuperSonics joined as expansion teams and were placed in the Western Division.
- The Detroit Pistons moved to the Eastern Division.

First season in NBA *

1967–68 NBA teams
Eastern	Western
Baltimore Bullets	Chicago Bulls
Boston Celtics	Los Angeles Lakers
Cincinnati Royals	San Diego Rockets*
Detroit Pistons	San Francisco Warriors
New York Knicks	Seattle SuperSonics*
Philadelphia 76ers	St. Louis Hawks

=== 1968 expansion and relocation ===
- The Milwaukee Bucks and Phoenix Suns joined as expansion teams. The Bucks were placed in the Eastern Division and the Suns in the Western Division.
- The St. Louis Hawks relocated to Atlanta to become the Atlanta Hawks.

1968–69 first season in NBA *

1968–69 to 1969–70 NBA teams
Eastern	Western
Baltimore Bullets	Atlanta Hawks
Boston Celtics	Chicago Bulls
Cincinnati Royals	Los Angeles Lakers
Detroit Pistons	Phoenix Suns*
Milwaukee Bucks*	San Diego Rockets
New York Knicks	San Francisco Warriors
Philadelphia 76ers	Seattle SuperSonics

=== 1970 expansion and realignment ===
- The league realigned into the Eastern and Western Conferences, with two new divisions each. The Atlantic and Central Divisions were added to the Eastern Conference, while the Midwest and Pacific Divisions were added to the Western Conference.
- The Buffalo Braves, Cleveland Cavaliers, and Portland Trail Blazers joined as expansion teams. The Braves were placed in the Atlantic Division, the Cavaliers in the Central Division, and the Trail Blazers in the Pacific Division.
- While most of the remaining teams were placed in the conference of the same name as their former division, the Atlanta Hawks moved from the Western Division to the Eastern Conference, while the Detroit Pistons and Milwaukee Bucks moved from the Eastern Division to the Western Conference.

First season in NBA *

1970–71 NBA teams
Eastern		Western	
Atlantic	Central	Midwest	Pacific
Boston Celtics	Atlanta Hawks	Chicago Bulls	Los Angeles Lakers
Buffalo Braves*	Baltimore Bullets	Detroit Pistons	Portland Trail Blazers*
New York Knicks	Cincinnati Royals	Milwaukee Bucks	San Diego Rockets
Philadelphia 76ers	Cleveland Cavaliers*	Phoenix Suns	San Francisco Warriors
			Seattle SuperSonics

=== 1971: Rockets and Warriors relocate ===
- The San Diego Rockets relocated to Houston to become the Houston Rockets.
- The San Francisco Warriors moved to Oakland to become the Golden State Warriors.

1971–72 NBA teams
Eastern		Western	
Atlantic	Central	Midwest	Pacific
Boston Celtics	Atlanta Hawks	Chicago Bulls	Golden State Warriors
Buffalo Braves	Baltimore Bullets	Detroit Pistons	Houston Rockets
New York Knicks	Cincinnati Royals	Milwaukee Bucks	Los Angeles Lakers
Philadelphia 76ers	Cleveland Cavaliers	Phoenix Suns	Portland Trail Blazers
			Seattle SuperSonics

=== 1972: Royals relocate to Kansas City–Omaha ===
- The Cincinnati Royals left Cincinnati and split their home games between Kansas City, Missouri and Omaha, Nebraska, becoming the Kansas City–Omaha Kings. They moved from the Central to the Midwest Division.
- The Houston Rockets moved from the Pacific to the Central Division.
- The Phoenix Suns moved from the Midwest to the Pacific Division.

1972–73 NBA teams
Eastern		Western	
Atlantic	Central	Midwest	Pacific
Boston Celtics	Atlanta Hawks	Chicago Bulls	Golden State Warriors
Buffalo Braves	Baltimore Bullets	Detroit Pistons	Los Angeles Lakers
New York Knicks	Cleveland Cavaliers	Kansas City–Omaha Kings	Phoenix Suns
Philadelphia 76ers	Houston Rockets	Milwaukee Bucks	Portland Trail Blazers
			Seattle SuperSonics

=== 1973: Bullets relocate ===
- The Baltimore Bullets relocated to the Washington, D.C. suburb of Landover, Maryland to become the Capital Bullets.

1973–74 NBA teams
Eastern		Western	
Atlantic	Central	Midwest	Pacific
Boston Celtics	Atlanta Hawks	Chicago Bulls	Golden State Warriors
Buffalo Braves	Capital Bullets	Detroit Pistons	Los Angeles Lakers
New York Knicks	Cleveland Cavaliers	Kansas City–Omaha Kings	Phoenix Suns
Philadelphia 76ers	Houston Rockets	Milwaukee Bucks	Portland Trail Blazers
			Seattle SuperSonics

=== 1974 expansion ===
- The New Orleans Jazz joined as an expansion team and were placed in the Central Division.
- The Capital Bullets renamed the Washington Bullets.

First season in NBA *

1974–75 NBA teams
Eastern		Western	
Atlantic	Central	Midwest	Pacific
Boston Celtics	Atlanta Hawks	Chicago Bulls	Golden State Warriors
Buffalo Braves	Cleveland Cavaliers	Detroit Pistons	Los Angeles Lakers
New York Knicks	Houston Rockets	Kansas City–Omaha Kings	Phoenix Suns
Philadelphia 76ers	New Orleans Jazz*	Milwaukee Bucks	Portland Trail Blazers
	Washington Bullets		Seattle SuperSonics

=== 1975: Kings play in Kansas City full-time ===
- The Kansas City–Omaha Kings abandoned playing in Omaha to become the Kansas City Kings.

1975–76 NBA teams
Eastern		Western	
Atlantic	Central	Midwest	Pacific
Boston Celtics	Atlanta Hawks	Chicago Bulls	Golden State Warriors
Buffalo Braves	Cleveland Cavaliers	Detroit Pistons	Los Angeles Lakers
New York Knicks	Houston Rockets	Kansas City Kings	Phoenix Suns
Philadelphia 76ers	New Orleans Jazz	Milwaukee Bucks	Portland Trail Blazers
	Washington Bullets		Seattle SuperSonics

== 1976–1988: ABA–NBA merger ==
=== 1976: ABA–NBA merger ===
- The Denver Nuggets, Indiana Pacers, New York Nets, and San Antonio Spurs joined from the American Basketball Association (ABA).

Team merged from ABA ^

1976–77 NBA teams
Eastern		Western	
Atlantic	Central	Midwest	Pacific
Boston Celtics	Atlanta Hawks	Chicago Bulls	Golden State Warriors
Buffalo Braves	Cleveland Cavaliers	Denver Nuggets^	Los Angeles Lakers
New York Knicks	Houston Rockets	Detroit Pistons	Phoenix Suns
New York Nets^	New Orleans Jazz	Indiana Pacers^	Portland Trail Blazers
Philadelphia 76ers	San Antonio Spurs^	Kansas City Kings	Seattle SuperSonics
	Washington Bullets	Milwaukee Bucks	

=== 1977: Nets relocate to New Jersey ===
- The New York Nets relocated to Piscataway, New Jersey to become the New Jersey Nets.

1977–78 NBA teams
Eastern		Western	
Atlantic	Central	Midwest	Pacific
Boston Celtics	Atlanta Hawks	Chicago Bulls	Golden State Warriors
Buffalo Braves	Cleveland Cavaliers	Denver Nuggets	Los Angeles Lakers
New Jersey Nets	Houston Rockets	Detroit Pistons	Phoenix Suns
New York Knicks	New Orleans Jazz	Indiana Pacers	Portland Trail Blazers
Philadelphia 76ers	San Antonio Spurs	Kansas City Kings	Seattle SuperSonics
	Washington Bullets	Milwaukee Bucks	

=== 1978: Braves relocate to San Diego ===
- The Buffalo Braves relocated to San Diego to become the San Diego Clippers and moved from the Atlantic to the Pacific Division.
- The Detroit Pistons moved from the Midwest to the Central Division.
- The Washington Bullets moved from the Central to the Atlantic Division.

1978–79 NBA teams
Eastern		Western	
Atlantic	Central	Midwest	Pacific
Boston Celtics	Atlanta Hawks	Chicago Bulls	Golden State Warriors
New Jersey Nets	Cleveland Cavaliers	Denver Nuggets	Los Angeles Lakers
New York Knicks	Detroit Pistons	Indiana Pacers	Phoenix Suns
Philadelphia 76ers	Houston Rockets	Kansas City Kings	Portland Trail Blazers
Washington Bullets	New Orleans Jazz	Milwaukee Bucks	San Diego Clippers
	San Antonio Spurs		Seattle SuperSonics

=== 1979: Jazz relocate to Utah ===
- The New Orleans Jazz relocated to Salt Lake City, Utah to become the Utah Jazz, and moved from the Central to the Midwest Division.
- The Indiana Pacers moved from the Midwest to the Central Division.

1979–80 NBA teams
Eastern		Western	
Atlantic	Central	Midwest	Pacific
Boston Celtics	Atlanta Hawks	Chicago Bulls	Golden State Warriors
New Jersey Nets	Cleveland Cavaliers	Denver Nuggets	Los Angeles Lakers
New York Knicks	Detroit Pistons	Kansas City Kings	Phoenix Suns
Philadelphia 76ers	Houston Rockets	Milwaukee Bucks	Portland Trail Blazers
Washington Bullets	Indiana Pacers	Utah Jazz	San Diego Clippers
	San Antonio Spurs		Seattle SuperSonics

=== 1980 expansion and realignment ===
- The Dallas Mavericks are enfranchised as the league's 23rd team and placed in the Midwest Division.
- The two other Texas teams, the Houston Rockets and San Antonio Spurs, moved from the Central to the Midwest Division to join the Mavericks.
- The Chicago Bulls and Milwaukee Bucks moved from the Midwest to the Central Division.

1980–81 is first season in NBA *

1980–81 to 1983–84 NBA teams
Eastern		Western	
Atlantic	Central	Midwest	Pacific
Boston Celtics	Atlanta Hawks	Dallas Mavericks*	Golden State Warriors
New Jersey Nets	Chicago Bulls	Denver Nuggets	Los Angeles Lakers
New York Knicks	Cleveland Cavaliers	Houston Rockets	Phoenix Suns
Philadelphia 76ers	Detroit Pistons	Kansas City Kings	Portland Trail Blazers
Washington Bullets	Indiana Pacers	San Antonio Spurs	San Diego Clippers
	Milwaukee Bucks	Utah Jazz	Seattle SuperSonics

=== 1984: Clippers relocate to Los Angeles ===
- The San Diego Clippers relocated to Los Angeles to become the Los Angeles Clippers.

1984–85 NBA teams
Eastern		Western	
Atlantic	Central	Midwest	Pacific
Boston Celtics	Atlanta Hawks	Dallas Mavericks	Golden State Warriors
New Jersey Nets	Chicago Bulls	Denver Nuggets	Los Angeles Clippers
New York Knicks	Cleveland Cavaliers	Houston Rockets	Los Angeles Lakers
Philadelphia 76ers	Detroit Pistons	Kansas City Kings	Phoenix Suns
Washington Bullets	Indiana Pacers	San Antonio Spurs	Portland Trail Blazers
	Milwaukee Bucks	Utah Jazz	Seattle SuperSonics

=== 1985: Kings relocate to Sacramento ===
- The Kansas City Kings relocated to Sacramento, California to become the Sacramento Kings.

1985–86 to 1987–88 NBA teams
Eastern		Western	
Atlantic	Central	Midwest	Pacific
Boston Celtics	Atlanta Hawks	Dallas Mavericks	Golden State Warriors
New Jersey Nets	Chicago Bulls	Denver Nuggets	Los Angeles Clippers
New York Knicks	Cleveland Cavaliers	Houston Rockets	Los Angeles Lakers
Philadelphia 76ers	Detroit Pistons	Sacramento Kings	Phoenix Suns
Washington Bullets	Indiana Pacers	San Antonio Spurs	Portland Trail Blazers
	Milwaukee Bucks	Utah Jazz	Seattle SuperSonics

== 1988–2004: Modern expansion era ==
=== 1988 expansion ===
- The Charlotte Hornets and Miami Heat are enfranchised as the league's 24th and 25th teams. The Hornets are placed in the Atlantic Division and the Heat in the Midwest Division.
- The Sacramento Kings moved from the Midwest to the Pacific Division.

First season in NBA *

1988–89 NBA teams
Eastern		Western	
Atlantic	Central	Midwest	Pacific
Boston Celtics	Atlanta Hawks	Dallas Mavericks	Golden State Warriors
Charlotte Hornets*	Chicago Bulls	Denver Nuggets	Los Angeles Clippers
New Jersey Nets	Cleveland Cavaliers	Houston Rockets	Los Angeles Lakers
New York Knicks	Detroit Pistons	Miami Heat*	Phoenix Suns
Philadelphia 76ers	Indiana Pacers	San Antonio Spurs	Portland Trail Blazers
Washington Bullets	Milwaukee Bucks	Utah Jazz	Sacramento Kings
			Seattle SuperSonics

=== 1989 expansion ===
- The Minnesota Timberwolves and Orlando Magic are enfranchised as the league's 26th and 27th teams. The Timberwolves are placed in the Midwest Division and the Magic in the Central Division.
- The Charlotte Hornets and Miami Heat switched conferences. The Hornets moved from the Atlantic to the Midwest Division, while the Heat moved from the Midwest to the Atlantic Division.

First season in NBA *

1989–90 NBA teams
Eastern		Western	
Atlantic	Central	Midwest	Pacific
Boston Celtics	Atlanta Hawks	Charlotte Hornets	Golden State Warriors
Miami Heat	Chicago Bulls	Dallas Mavericks	Los Angeles Clippers
New Jersey Nets	Cleveland Cavaliers	Denver Nuggets	Los Angeles Lakers
New York Knicks	Detroit Pistons	Houston Rockets	Phoenix Suns
Philadelphia 76ers	Indiana Pacers	Minnesota Timberwolves*	Portland Trail Blazers
Washington Bullets	Milwaukee Bucks	San Antonio Spurs	Sacramento Kings
	Orlando Magic*	Utah Jazz	Seattle SuperSonics

=== 1990: Hornets and Magic switch conferences ===
- The Charlotte Hornets moved from the Midwest to the Central Division, while the Orlando Magic moved from the Central to the Midwest Division.

1990–91 NBA teams
Eastern		Western	
Atlantic	Central	Midwest	Pacific
Boston Celtics	Atlanta Hawks	Dallas Mavericks	Golden State Warriors
Miami Heat	Charlotte Hornets	Denver Nuggets	Los Angeles Clippers
New Jersey Nets	Chicago Bulls	Houston Rockets	Los Angeles Lakers
New York Knicks	Cleveland Cavaliers	Minnesota Timberwolves	Phoenix Suns
Philadelphia 76ers	Detroit Pistons	Orlando Magic	Portland Trail Blazers
Washington Bullets	Indiana Pacers	San Antonio Spurs	Sacramento Kings
	Milwaukee Bucks	Utah Jazz	Seattle SuperSonics

=== 1991: Magic moves back to the Eastern Conference ===
- The Orlando Magic moved from the Midwest to the Atlantic Division to reduce travel after spending the previous season in the Western Conference.

1991–92 to 1994–95 NBA teams
Eastern		Western	
Atlantic	Central	Midwest	Pacific
Boston Celtics	Atlanta Hawks	Dallas Mavericks	Golden State Warriors
Miami Heat	Charlotte Hornets	Denver Nuggets	Los Angeles Clippers
New Jersey Nets	Chicago Bulls	Houston Rockets	Los Angeles Lakers
New York Knicks	Cleveland Cavaliers	Minnesota Timberwolves	Phoenix Suns
Orlando Magic	Detroit Pistons	San Antonio Spurs	Portland Trail Blazers
Philadelphia 76ers	Indiana Pacers	Utah Jazz	Sacramento Kings
Washington Bullets	Milwaukee Bucks		Seattle SuperSonics

=== 1995 expansion ===
- The NBA expands into Canada as the Toronto Raptors and Vancouver Grizzlies are enfranchised as the league's 28th and 29th teams. The Raptors are placed in the Central Division and the Grizzlies in the Midwest Division.

1995–96 is first season in NBA *

1995–96 to 1996–97 NBA teams
Eastern		Western	
Atlantic	Central	Midwest	Pacific
Boston Celtics	Atlanta Hawks	Dallas Mavericks	Golden State Warriors
Miami Heat	Charlotte Hornets	Denver Nuggets	Los Angeles Clippers
New Jersey Nets	Chicago Bulls	Houston Rockets	Los Angeles Lakers
New York Knicks	Cleveland Cavaliers	Minnesota Timberwolves	Phoenix Suns
Orlando Magic	Detroit Pistons	San Antonio Spurs	Portland Trail Blazers
Philadelphia 76ers	Indiana Pacers	Utah Jazz	Sacramento Kings
Washington Bullets	Milwaukee Bucks	Vancouver Grizzlies*	Seattle SuperSonics
	Toronto Raptors*		

=== 1997: Washington renaming ===
- The Washington Bullets are renamed the Washington Wizards.

1997–98 to 2000–01 NBA teams
Eastern		Western	
Atlantic	Central	Midwest	Pacific
Boston Celtics	Atlanta Hawks	Dallas Mavericks	Golden State Warriors
Miami Heat	Charlotte Hornets	Denver Nuggets	Los Angeles Clippers
New Jersey Nets	Chicago Bulls	Houston Rockets	Los Angeles Lakers
New York Knicks	Cleveland Cavaliers	Minnesota Timberwolves	Phoenix Suns
Orlando Magic	Detroit Pistons	San Antonio Spurs	Portland Trail Blazers
Philadelphia 76ers	Indiana Pacers	Utah Jazz	Sacramento Kings
Washington Wizards	Milwaukee Bucks	Vancouver Grizzlies	Seattle SuperSonics
	Toronto Raptors		

=== 2001: Grizzlies relocate to Memphis ===
- The Vancouver Grizzlies relocated to Memphis, Tennessee to become the Memphis Grizzlies.

2001–02 NBA teams
Eastern		Western	
Atlantic	Central	Midwest	Pacific
Boston Celtics	Atlanta Hawks	Dallas Mavericks	Golden State Warriors
Miami Heat	Charlotte Hornets	Denver Nuggets	Los Angeles Clippers
New Jersey Nets	Chicago Bulls	Houston Rockets	Los Angeles Lakers
New York Knicks	Cleveland Cavaliers	Memphis Grizzlies	Phoenix Suns
Orlando Magic	Detroit Pistons	Minnesota Timberwolves	Portland Trail Blazers
Philadelphia 76ers	Indiana Pacers	San Antonio Spurs	Sacramento Kings
Washington Wizards	Milwaukee Bucks	Utah Jazz	Seattle SuperSonics
	Toronto Raptors		

=== 2002: Hornets relocate to New Orleans ===
The Charlotte Hornets relocated to New Orleans to become the New Orleans Hornets.

2002–03 to 2003–04 NBA teams
Eastern		Western	
Atlantic	Central	Midwest	Pacific
Boston Celtics	Atlanta Hawks	Dallas Mavericks	Golden State Warriors
Miami Heat	Chicago Bulls	Denver Nuggets	Los Angeles Clippers
New Jersey Nets	Cleveland Cavaliers	Houston Rockets	Los Angeles Lakers
New York Knicks	Detroit Pistons	Memphis Grizzlies	Phoenix Suns
Orlando Magic	Indiana Pacers	Minnesota Timberwolves	Portland Trail Blazers
Philadelphia 76ers	Milwaukee Bucks	San Antonio Spurs	Sacramento Kings
Washington Wizards	New Orleans Hornets	Utah Jazz	Seattle SuperSonics
	Toronto Raptors		

== 2004–present: Realignment ==
=== 2004 expansion and realignment ===
- The Charlotte Bobcats are enfranchised as the league's 30th team.
- The league realigned to create three divisions in each conference with five teams in each division.
- The New Orleans Hornets switch conferences, moving from the Eastern Conference to the Western Conference.

First season in NBA *

2004–05 NBA teams
Eastern			Western		
Atlantic	Central	Southeast	Northwest	Pacific	Southwest
Boston Celtics	Chicago Bulls	Atlanta Hawks	Denver Nuggets	Golden State Warriors	Dallas Mavericks
New Jersey Nets	Cleveland Cavaliers	Charlotte Bobcats*	Minnesota Timberwolves	Los Angeles Clippers	Houston Rockets
New York Knicks	Detroit Pistons	Miami Heat	Portland Trail Blazers	Los Angeles Lakers	Memphis Grizzlies
Philadelphia 76ers	Indiana Pacers	Orlando Magic	Seattle SuperSonics	Phoenix Suns	New Orleans Hornets
Toronto Raptors	Milwaukee Bucks	Washington Wizards	Utah Jazz	Sacramento Kings	San Antonio Spurs

=== 2005: Hurricane Katrina impacts Hornets ===
- Due to the damages caused by Hurricane Katrina, the Hornets split their home games between New Orleans and Oklahoma City for two seasons, and thus officially played as the New Orleans–Oklahoma City Hornets.

2005–06 to 2006–07 NBA teams
Eastern			Western		
Atlantic	Central	Southeast	Northwest	Pacific	Southwest
Boston Celtics	Chicago Bulls	Atlanta Hawks	Denver Nuggets	Golden State Warriors	Dallas Mavericks
New Jersey Nets	Cleveland Cavaliers	Charlotte Bobcats	Minnesota Timberwolves	Los Angeles Clippers	Houston Rockets
New York Knicks	Detroit Pistons	Miami Heat	Portland Trail Blazers	Los Angeles Lakers	Memphis Grizzlies
Philadelphia 76ers	Indiana Pacers	Orlando Magic	Seattle SuperSonics	Phoenix Suns	New Orleans–Oklahoma City Hornets
Toronto Raptors	Milwaukee Bucks	Washington Wizards	Utah Jazz	Sacramento Kings	San Antonio Spurs

=== 2007: Hornets return to New Orleans full-time ===
- With damages caused by Hurricane Katrina fully repaired, the Hornets returned to New Orleans full-time.

2007–08 NBA teams
Eastern			Western		
Atlantic	Central	Southeast	Northwest	Pacific	Southwest
Boston Celtics	Chicago Bulls	Atlanta Hawks	Denver Nuggets	Golden State Warriors	Dallas Mavericks
New Jersey Nets	Cleveland Cavaliers	Charlotte Bobcats	Minnesota Timberwolves	Los Angeles Clippers	Houston Rockets
New York Knicks	Detroit Pistons	Miami Heat	Portland Trail Blazers	Los Angeles Lakers	Memphis Grizzlies
Philadelphia 76ers	Indiana Pacers	Orlando Magic	Seattle SuperSonics	Phoenix Suns	New Orleans Hornets
Toronto Raptors	Milwaukee Bucks	Washington Wizards	Utah Jazz	Sacramento Kings	San Antonio Spurs

=== 2008: SuperSonics relocate to Oklahoma City ===
The Seattle SuperSonics relocated to Oklahoma City and were renamed the Oklahoma City Thunder.

2008–09 to 2011–12 NBA teams
Eastern			Western		
Atlantic	Central	Southeast	Northwest	Pacific	Southwest
Boston Celtics	Chicago Bulls	Atlanta Hawks	Denver Nuggets	Golden State Warriors	Dallas Mavericks
New Jersey Nets	Cleveland Cavaliers	Charlotte Bobcats	Minnesota Timberwolves	Los Angeles Clippers	Houston Rockets
New York Knicks	Detroit Pistons	Miami Heat	Oklahoma City Thunder	Los Angeles Lakers	Memphis Grizzlies
Philadelphia 76ers	Indiana Pacers	Orlando Magic	Portland Trail Blazers	Phoenix Suns	New Orleans Hornets
Toronto Raptors	Milwaukee Bucks	Washington Wizards	Utah Jazz	Sacramento Kings	San Antonio Spurs

=== 2012: Nets relocate to Brooklyn ===
The New Jersey Nets relocated to Brooklyn to become the Brooklyn Nets.

2012–13 NBA teams
Eastern			Western		
Atlantic	Central	Southeast	Northwest	Pacific	Southwest
Boston Celtics	Chicago Bulls	Atlanta Hawks	Denver Nuggets	Golden State Warriors	Dallas Mavericks
Brooklyn Nets	Cleveland Cavaliers	Charlotte Bobcats	Minnesota Timberwolves	Los Angeles Clippers	Houston Rockets
New York Knicks	Detroit Pistons	Miami Heat	Oklahoma City Thunder	Los Angeles Lakers	Memphis Grizzlies
Philadelphia 76ers	Indiana Pacers	Orlando Magic	Portland Trail Blazers	Phoenix Suns	New Orleans Hornets
Toronto Raptors	Milwaukee Bucks	Washington Wizards	Utah Jazz	Sacramento Kings	San Antonio Spurs

=== 2013: New Orleans renaming ===
The New Orleans Hornets are renamed the New Orleans Pelicans.

2013–14 NBA teams
Eastern			Western		
Atlantic	Central	Southeast	Northwest	Pacific	Southwest
Boston Celtics	Chicago Bulls	Atlanta Hawks	Denver Nuggets	Golden State Warriors	Dallas Mavericks
Brooklyn Nets	Cleveland Cavaliers	Charlotte Bobcats	Minnesota Timberwolves	Los Angeles Clippers	Houston Rockets
New York Knicks	Detroit Pistons	Miami Heat	Oklahoma City Thunder	Los Angeles Lakers	Memphis Grizzlies
Philadelphia 76ers	Indiana Pacers	Orlando Magic	Portland Trail Blazers	Phoenix Suns	New Orleans Pelicans
Toronto Raptors	Milwaukee Bucks	Washington Wizards	Utah Jazz	Sacramento Kings	San Antonio Spurs

=== 2014: Charlotte renaming ===
The Charlotte Bobcats are renamed the Charlotte Hornets after the New Orleans Pelicans agree to return the original Charlotte Hornets' name, history, and records from 1988 to 2002 to the city of Charlotte.

2014–15 to the present NBA teams
Eastern			Western		
Atlantic	Central	Southeast	Northwest	Pacific	Southwest
Boston Celtics	Chicago Bulls	Atlanta Hawks	Denver Nuggets	Golden State Warriors	Dallas Mavericks
Brooklyn Nets	Cleveland Cavaliers	Charlotte Hornets	Minnesota Timberwolves	Los Angeles Clippers	Houston Rockets
New York Knicks	Detroit Pistons	Miami Heat	Oklahoma City Thunder	Los Angeles Lakers	Memphis Grizzlies
Philadelphia 76ers	Indiana Pacers	Orlando Magic	Portland Trail Blazers	Phoenix Suns	New Orleans Pelicans
Toronto Raptors	Milwaukee Bucks	Washington Wizards	Utah Jazz	Sacramento Kings	San Antonio Spurs

== See also ==
- History of the National Basketball Association
- List of defunct NBA teams
- List of relocated NBA teams
- Expansion of the NBA
