= Vancouver Grizzlies relocation to Memphis =

Moving of an NBA team in 2001

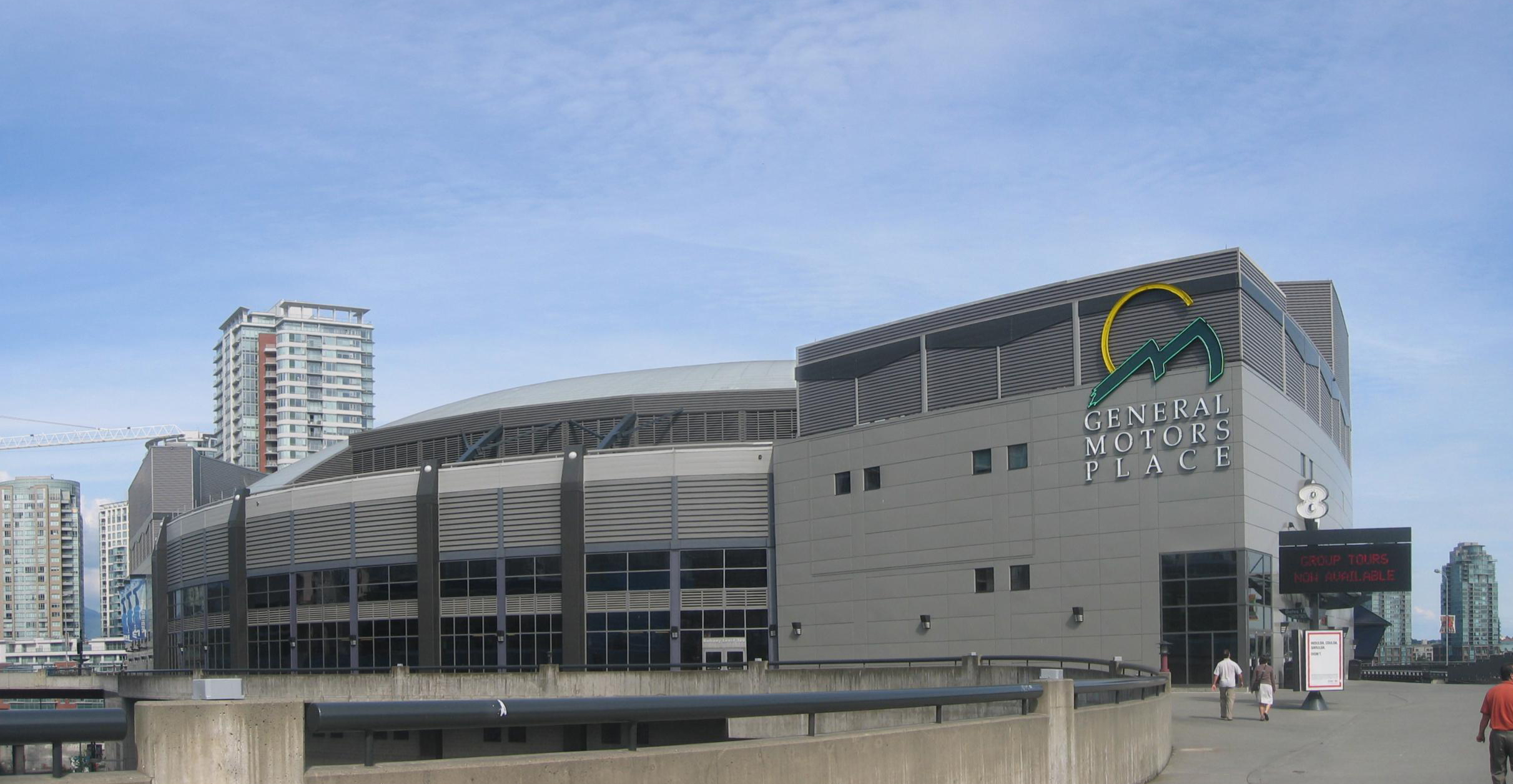
General Motors Place, now Rogers Arena, was the Vancouver Grizzlies' home arena.

On July 3, 2001, the Vancouver Grizzlies, a Canadian professional basketball team that competed in the National Basketball Association (NBA), moved from its original city of Vancouver to the American city of Memphis, Tennessee. The team began play as the Memphis Grizzlies in the 2001–02 season. It was the first of three NBA franchises to move between 2001 and 2008, and the third of four major league teams to move from Canada to the United States between 1995 and 2005.

The Grizzlies had been created as an expansion team along with the Toronto Raptors in 1995. For the six seasons in Vancouver, the Grizzlies performed unsuccessfully; they only once finished better than last in the Midwest Division and never reached the playoffs. The Grizzlies were owned by Orca Bay Sports and Entertainment, who also owned the Vancouver Canucks of the National Hockey League (NHL). In 1999, Bill Laurie, owner of the NHL's St. Louis Blues, attempted to buy the Grizzlies, with the intent to move it to St. Louis. After interference by the NBA, the Grizzlies were sold to Michael Heisley. He immediately started the process to move the team, and eight U.S. cities were candidates for the team—Anaheim, California; Buffalo, New York; Memphis, Tennessee; New Orleans, Louisiana; Tampa, Florida; Louisville, Kentucky; Las Vegas, Nevada; and San Diego, California—before settling on the move to Memphis at the end of the season.

In the first four Grizzlies seasons, annual attendance had been in the top third of the league or at least in the middle, but it had plunged to among the league's worst in the last two seasons, largely due to the team's poor performance and the 1998–99 NBA lockout. Contributing to the conditions for relocation were a weak Canadian dollar, unwillingness of some American players to live in Canada, and unfavorable weather.

== Background ==
Memphis had hosted a major professional basketball team in the American Basketball Association (ABA). Founded as the New Orleans Buccaneers in 1967, the franchise moved to Memphis in 1970, becoming known as the Pros. The team changed its name to the Tams and then the Sounds, then folded in 1975 before the ABA–NBA merger in 1976.

The Grizzlies were created as an expansion team for the 1995–96 season which, along with the creation of the Toronto Raptors, saw the NBA expand into Canada. The Grizzlies were owned by Vancouver Canucks owner Arthur Griffiths. His company was in the process of building General Motors Place (GM Place) for the Canucks, and saw the Grizzlies as an additional tenant. Both Canadian teams (the Vancouver Grizzlies and the Toronto Raptors) were hampered by the NBA's decision to deny them one of the top five picks in the first draft, and the teams would not be allowed a top draft pick in the following three seasons, even if they should win the lottery. The teams were also hindered from using their full salary cap the first two seasons. For all six seasons in Vancouver, the Grizzlies had a terrible record. They finished seventh of seven in five seasons, and claimed one sixth place in the Midwest Division, never close to reaching the playoffs. The team won 101 games and lost 359, giving a winning percentage of .220.

== Change of ownership ==
On March 7, 1995, six months before the Grizzlies began play, the majority of the holding company was sold from Griffiths to Seattle-based John McCaw, Jr. On November 12, 1996, McCaw bought the rest of company. He stated that he was committed to retaining the team in Vancouver. Griffiths was forced to sell the Canucks and Grizzlies following the cost overruns that occurred on GM Place, and the expansion fees to start the Grizzlies had made his company illiquid.

In 1999, McCaw started attempts to sell either Orca Bay or the Grizzlies, and at first negotiated an agreement with Dennis Washington, owner of Seaspan, who had a large portion of his operations in Vancouver. Washington initially agreed to purchase 50% of Orca Bay, with the intent of keeping the teams in Vancouver. Instead, McCaw used Washington's bid to obtain a higher sales price with Bill Laurie, who offered US$148 million for the Grizzlies, and a US$52 million bonus if the team moved to St. Louis. The announcement was made in September 1999, one month after Laurie had bought the NHL team St. Louis Blues and their home venue Kiel Center (now the Enterprise Center). St. Louis had not hosted an NBA franchise since the Hawks moved to Atlanta in 1968. At the time, Kiel Center sold out 15 to 17 Saint Louis University Billikens basketball games each year.

After the deal was announced, NBA Commissioner David Stern said he wanted the Grizzlies remain in Vancouver because no NBA franchise had changed cities since 1985, when the Kansas City Kings moved to Sacramento, California. The NBA Board of Governors' Finance Committee also made negative statements, as the purchase agreement was structured with incentives to move the team. The deal was renegotiated before the board could vote on it. On January 21, 2001, Laurie announced that he had paid McCaw an undisclosed amount to walk away from the deal.

Four days later, on January 25, it was announced that the Grizzlies were sold to Chicago-based Michael Heisley for US$160 million. At a press conference, he stated that he had the support of Stern, that he was committed to keeping the franchise in Vancouver, to making it a winning team, and that he was an owner that was committed to the market.

== Reasons for moving ==
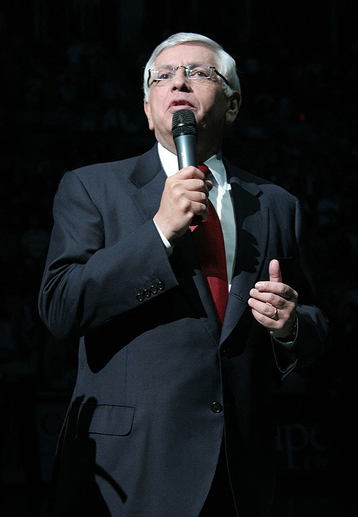
Then-Commissioner of the NBA David Stern initially opposed the team's planned move from Vancouver.

Dick Versace, the Grizzlies' president of basketball operations, stated in the final Vancouver season that the company was losing US$40 million per season. These numbers were questioned by Richard Peddie, CEO of the Raptors, as the Grizzlies had a salary cap of US$48 million. Retrospectively, Heisley stated that he lost US$87 million on owning the Grizzlies, although that included a US$30 million relocation fee to the NBA. Versace stated that he felt that the team did not get sufficient support from the business community. Colin Jones, University of Victoria professor in sports economics, stated that it was difficult to attract corporate sponsors as long as the team was losing so many games; the Grizzlies' lack of good draft picks led to the team failing to win, thus losing revenue. He also noted that the team never sought help in the general business community regarding management issues.

Stu Jackson, general manager for the first five seasons, made several non-optimal player selection decisions. This included selecting Bryant Reeves in the 1995 draft, and signing him to a US$65 million six-year contract extension in 1997, putting the Grizzlies in a salary cap squeeze. From then he consequently drafted point guards, including Antonio Daniels, who failed to develop. Jackson traded a 2003 first-round pick for Otis Thorpe, who "hated Vancouver". He signed free agent Tony Massenburg for US$1.5 million, just to sign Isaac Austin for US$5.5 million and leave Massenburg on the bench. Griffiths retrospectively stated that the draft conditions from the NBA did not allow the franchise to build a winning team in years, and that the NBA had asked too high a price for not providing the means of a suitable income. However, he did draft Shareef Abdur-Rahim and his hands were tied when top pick Steve Francis refused to play for Vancouver. On the other hand, the Raptors succeeded in acquiring Vince Carter, reached the playoffs in the 1999–2000 season and played consistently in front of sell-out crowds.

The location of the team in Canada was a major contributor; at the time the exchange rate was 67 U.S. cents to the Canadian dollar. Because revenue was collected in Canadian dollars but player and coach salaries were paid in U.S. dollars, the team ended up spending an undue amount of its revenue on salaries. The 1998–99 lockout was the pivoting point for home game attendance. While the whole league experienced a drop in attendance after the lockout, Vancouver experienced an even larger fall. The average attendance in 1997–98 was 16,108, ranking 16th in the league, while it fell to 13,899 in 1999–00, ranking 27th.

Retrospectively, Griffiths stated that Heisley intentionally ran the team financially aground by alienating people, running insufficient marketing, and claiming basketball did not work in Vancouver. While running the team, Griffiths had not lost "millions and millions" and he stated that Vancouver had a better fan base than most NBA teams. The statements were denied by Heisley.

== Proposed cities ==
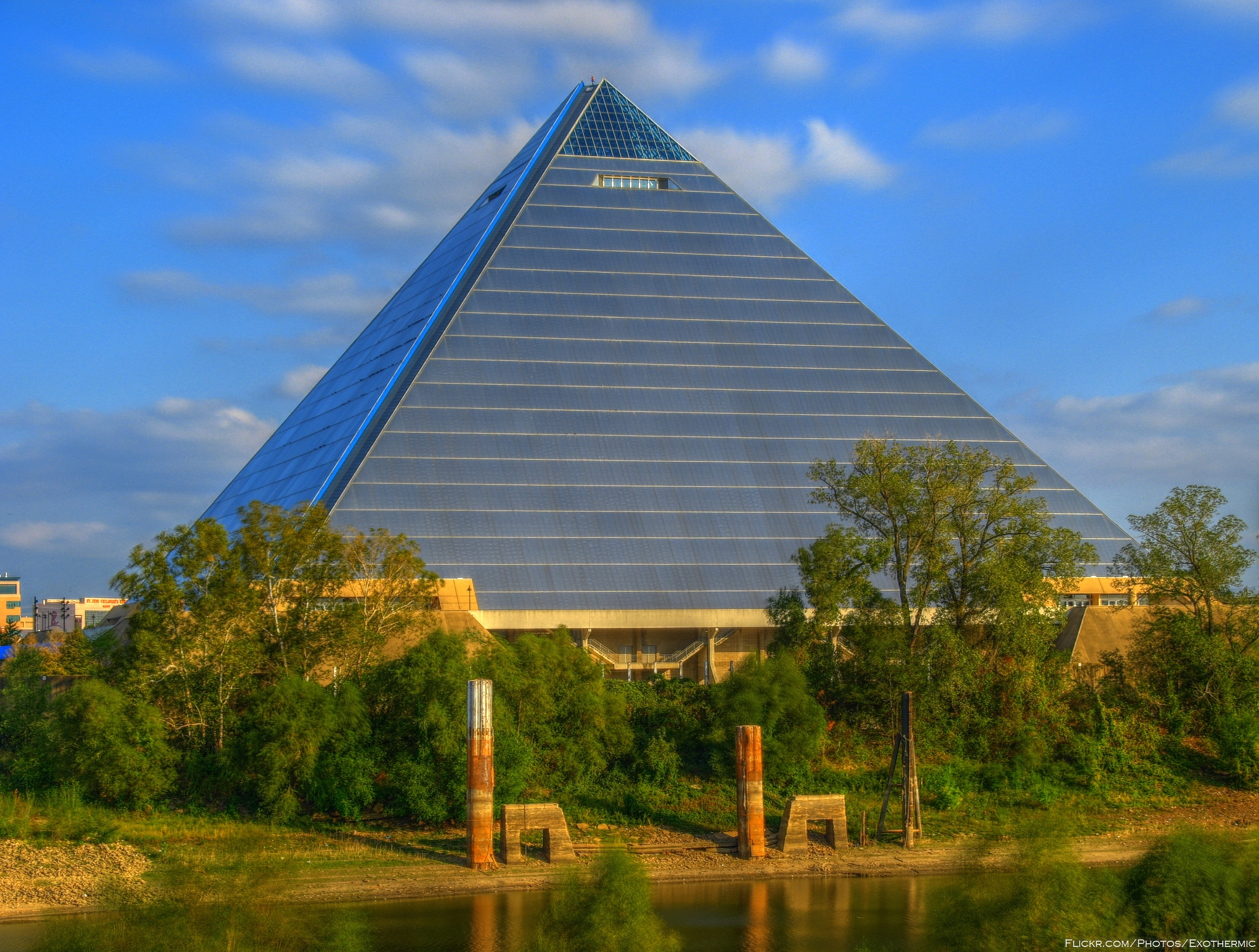
The Memphis Pyramid, then known as Pyramid Arena, was the home venue for the Grizzlies from 2001 to 2004.

With the public announcement in mid-February of the team's possible move, Heisley and representatives for the Grizzlies set out on a road trip to several U.S. cities that sought the franchise. Originally, Heisley had until March 1 to apply for permission to move, but the NBA later extended the deadline to March 26. A similar deadline was also given to the Charlotte Hornets, which were also considering moving.

In February 2001, the Louisville Board of Aldermen contacted the Grizzlies in an attempt to move the team to Louisville, Kentucky. The city lacked a suitable venue, but state and local officials agreed to build a new US$200 million arena if the NBA franchise moved to the city. In addition, Tricon Global Restaurants (now Yum! Brands) would offer Heisley US$5 million per year for 20 years to put the team in Louisville. (Ultimately, while the Grizzlies did not move there, the city built its own NBA-suitable arena in 2010 called the KFC Yum! Center; It houses the University of Louisville's basketball program.)

Memphis had begun trying to get an NBA team in 1997, after the Houston Oilers of the National Football League moved to Tennessee. The city's effort was led by AutoZone founder Pitt Hyde, who promised to purchase 50% of the team. The city had Pyramid Arena, completed in 1991, that could be used as a temporary home until a new US$250 million venue was ready for use in 2004. The venue would be publicly financed through sales tax rebates, government-backed bonds, and hotel and car rental taxes.

New Orleans mayor Marc Morial stated that he had approached Heisley in an attempt to attract the Grizzlies to his city. The city had opened the US$114 million New Orleans Arena (now Smoothie King Center) in 1999, and offered it as a home to the franchise. Metrovision, the area's economic development chamber, stated that they had secured guarantees for purchasing suites, season tickets and club seating from businesses to the extent that there was a waiting list for suites. A move to St. Louis, under the same conditions as with Laurie, was also considered.

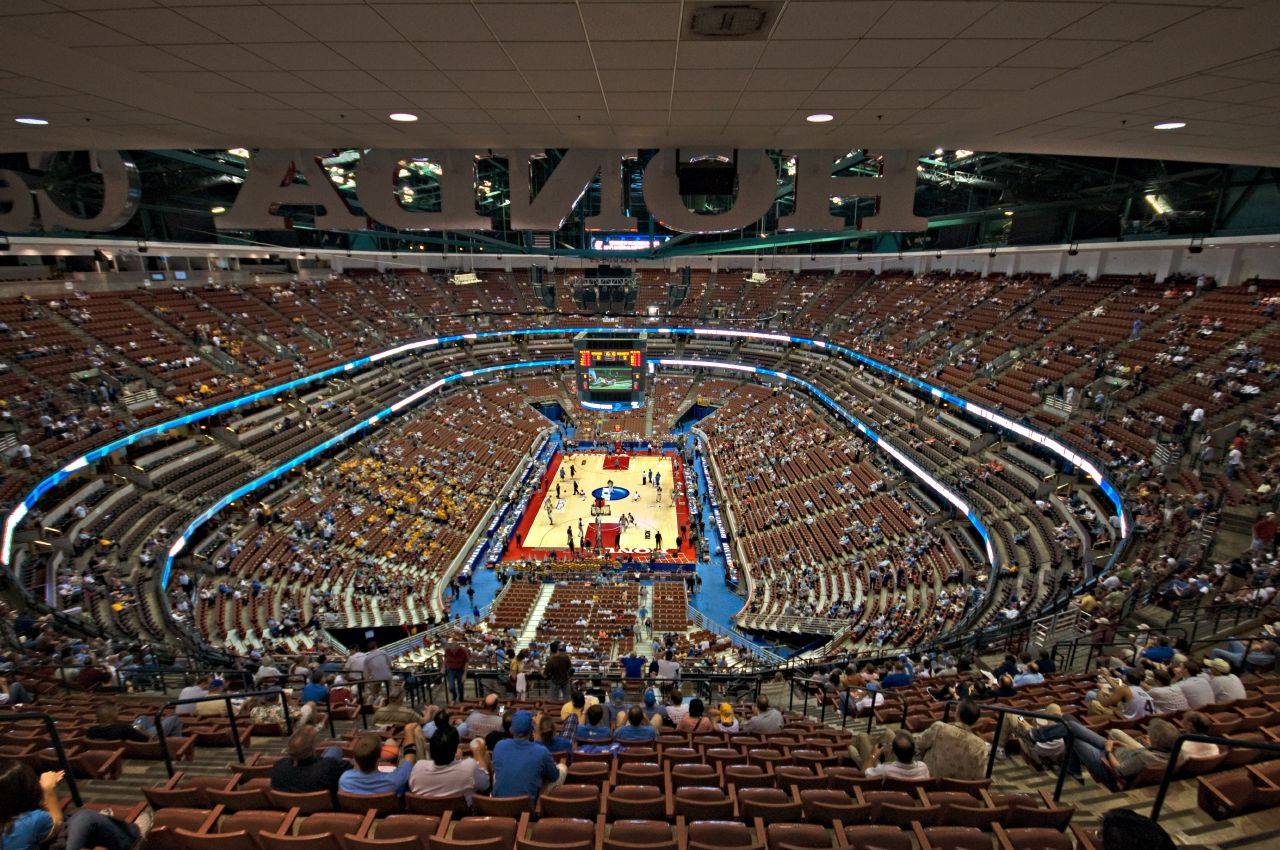
Arrowhead Pond of Anaheim, home of the NHL's Mighty Ducks of Anaheim, was considered as a relocation site.

Another option was Anaheim, in the Greater Los Angeles area. The Houston Rockets had previously looked into moving to Arrowhead Pond of Anaheim (now Honda Center), home arena of the NHL's Mighty Ducks of Anaheim. However, the Mighty Ducks had an agreement that any other tenant at the Pond should share revenues with their then-owner, The Walt Disney Company, although Disney stated they were willing to negotiate the terms. The Grizzlies would also have had to share the market with the Los Angeles Lakers and Los Angeles Clippers.

Buffalo, New York, announced interest in attracting the Grizzlies. The city had an appropriate venue in HSBC Arena (now KeyBank Center), home of the Buffalo Sabres NHL ice hockey franchise. Mayor Anthony Masiello, a former college basketball star, stated that the attempt was "a long shot", but worth the try. The city previously hosted an NBA franchise in the Buffalo Braves, from 1970 to 1978, which was only dismantled because Paul Snyder, who owned the team from 1971 to 1976, was feuding with other teams that used Buffalo's only arena at the time (Buffalo Memorial Auditorium); some of those conflicts were no longer issues with the new arena, and Snyder was still active in business at the time of the Grizzlies bid. The Braves became the San Diego Clippers in 1978 and moved to Los Angeles in 1984; San Diego was also mentioned as a potential site for the Grizzlies, although the city lacked a suitable venue. Heisley visited Las Vegas, Nevada, where he negotiated with Mayor Oscar Goodman. The city offered the team free land for a new arena, but would not pay for construction. The other issue was Stern's demand that casinos stop accepting bets on NBA games as a precondition of placing a team in Las Vegas.

The strongest bids were Memphis, Louisville, Anaheim, and New Orleans. As the latter two had venues in place, they were seen as having an edge on the other two. Both Memphis and Louisville needed public funding for a new venue, and in either city, the team would have to play in a sub-optimal location for several seasons. However, the construction of a new venue was seen as an advantage by the Grizzlies, as it could be tailor-made for basketball, and the team would be able to control all revenue. The team also expected the highest local radio and television broadcasting rights in Louisville and Memphis, and that the two cities lacked other Big Four major league teams, granting the team preferred air times and increased attention from fans and media. A 2000 report from PricewaterhouseCoopers concluded that small cities often had higher attendance than larger cities because of team's professional league exclusivity. It also pointed to the strong support for college basketball in Tennessee and Kentucky.

== The move ==
In Vancouver, the organization Save the Grizzlies was established to find a local investor to purchase the team. Led by among others Peter Ufford, they had a plan to create a public entity which could take over ownership of the team. Ufford retrospectively stated that had the attempt been given more time, they may have been able to secure a deal to keep the team in town, but that the decision to move came too quickly for any plan to be finalized. Heisley stated that he had been willing to sell the team with a 30% discount to a Vancouver investor if he could secure a guarantee that the team would remain in town.

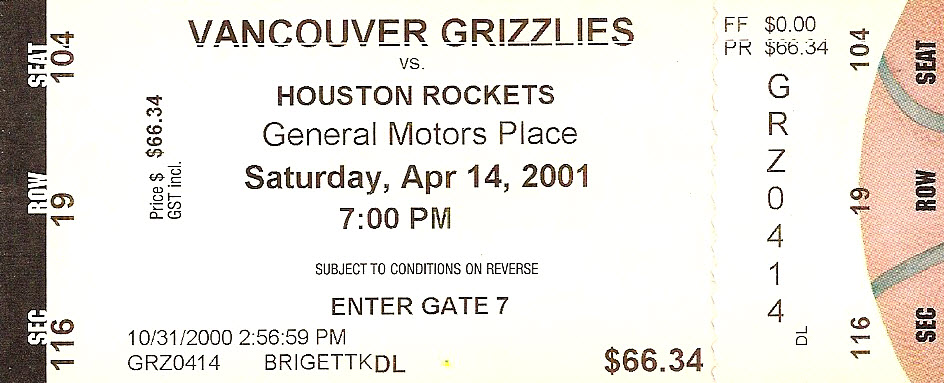
A ticket from the Grizzlies' final home game in Vancouver

On March 26, 2001, Heisley announced that he had selected Memphis. Memphis and Louisville were the most promising cities, with Heisley selecting Memphis because it offered a better deal and because of poor local executive leadership in Louisville. The choice would still have to be studied by a five-member NBA group before permission was granted from the league.

The night before Heisley's announcement concerning Memphis' selection, the Grizzlies had lost 102–92 to the Raptors in Toronto in what would turn out to be the final NBA game between two Canadian teams. The team's final game at GM Place was a 100–95 loss against the Houston Rockets on April 14; the team's final game as a Vancouver-based franchise was a 95–81 road win against the Golden State Warriors on April 18.

The NBA relocation committee gave its approval for the move to Memphis in late June, and on July 3 the Board of Governors unanimously approved the move. This also permitted Hyde to purchase a minority share of the franchise. By then, the team administration had already moved, and the day before the final decision, the team set up its rookie camp at Rhodes College. A moving party was held on July 7. A week before the move, the Grizzlies traded away two of the top players, Shareef Abdur-Rahim and guard Mike Bibby.

Unlike all other major professional sports teams that moved from Canada to the U.S., the Grizzlies did not adopt a new nickname. A factor in this decision was that Memphis already had a history with the "Grizzlies" name, and one which had a Canadian connection. The Toronto Northmen of the ill-fated World Football League, who had faced legal obstacles in their bid to play American football in Canada, moved to Memphis before playing a game and were officially rebranded the Memphis Southmen. The Southmen name was so unpopular with fans that the team, whose logo prominently featured a grizzly bear, became known during its brief existence as the "Grizzlies" on a semi-official basis.

== Aftermath ==
The move to Memphis did not solve the Grizzlies' financial problems, and as of 2011 the team's cumulative loss was US$100 million. The team did manage a 50-win season and reached the playoffs four times, but failed to advance in the playoffs until the 2010–11 season. As of 2025, the Grizzlies are, according to Forbes, the least-valuable NBA franchise, at US $3.5 billion. Attendance did not exceed Vancouver levels for more than a decade after the move. The Grizzlies averaged 13,737 spectators in their first season in Memphis; the first season in which they exceeded Vancouver attendance levels was 2012–13, when they averaged 16,624.

The Grizzlies were the first NBA team to move since the Kansas City Kings moved to Sacramento, California and became the Sacramento Kings in 1985. It was followed by two others in the same decade. The first was the move of the original Charlotte Hornets to New Orleans in 2002, with the team becoming the New Orleans Hornets (now Pelicans). (That move is no longer treated by the league as such; after the 2013–14 season, the franchise then known as the Charlotte Bobcats reclaimed the Hornets name and also received sole rights to the history of the Hornets in Charlotte.) The second was in 2008, when the Seattle SuperSonics moved to become the Oklahoma City Thunder. The move of the Grizzlies was one of several professional teams that moved from Canada to the United States in the 1990s and 2000s when the Canadian dollar was weak; in the NHL, two teams moved from Canada to the U.S. during the mid-1990s: the Quebec Nordiques became the Colorado Avalanche in 1995, and the Winnipeg Jets became the Phoenix Coyotes in 1996 and were rebranded as the Arizona Coyotes in 2014 (a new Winnipeg Jets team returned to the city in 2011: the former Atlanta Thrashers). In 2005, one of Canada's two Major League Baseball teams (the Montreal Expos) moved to Washington, D.C. and became the Washington Nationals. The failure of the Vancouver franchise was part of the reason the NBA changed the expansion drafting rules following the return of Charlotte to the league as the Bobcats in 2004. The Bobcats were allowed to pick fourth in their first draft, and were later not restricted from first picks.

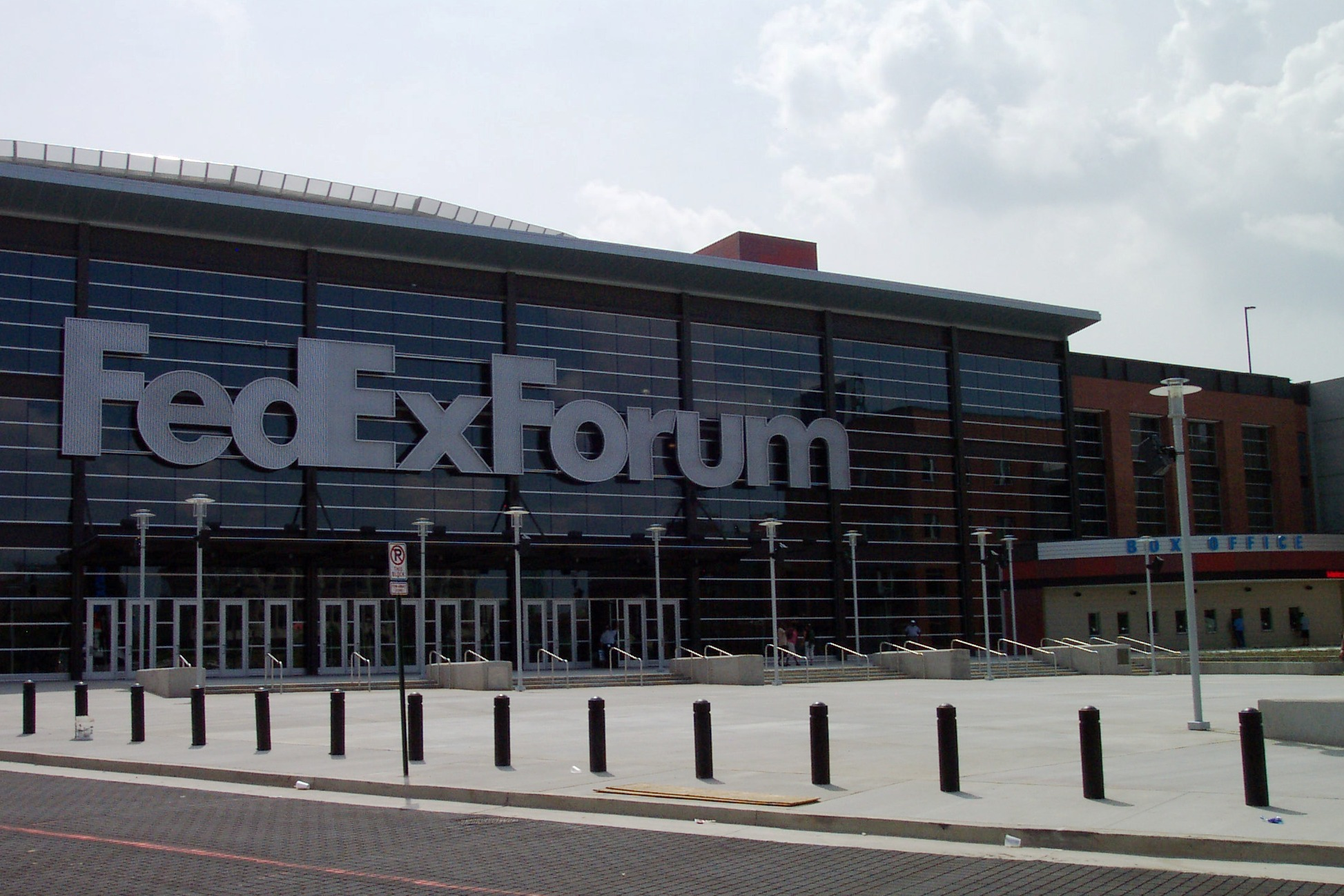
FedExForum has been the Grizzlies' home venue since 2004

In a major change from 2001—when one unnamed former NBA executive stated that a franchise would not return to Vancouver in his lifetime—Stern revealed in February 2011 that Vancouver was being considered along with Pittsburgh, Tampa and Kansas City. Reasons for considering Vancouver are the strengthening of the Canadian dollar, which for several years in the early 2010s was roughly at par with the U.S. dollar; the influx of international players who would be more willing to play in Canada; sell-outs for pre-season exhibition games at Rogers Arena (the current name of what was once General Motors Place); Vancouver having a state-of-the-art venue; and an increased realization among NBA executives that the Vancouver failure was not predominantly because of lack of interest for basketball in Vancouver. The city has also been through a resurrection in professional sports, with the creation of the Vancouver Giants in junior hockey, the 2010 Winter Olympics, and Vancouver Whitecaps FC joining Major League Soccer. However, the location of the city also allows for more varied sports experiences, such as skiing, hunting, fishing and golf, which could partially limit the interest for spectator sports. In addition, the Canadian dollar dramatically weakened against its U.S. counterpart later in the decade, dropping as low as 68 U.S. cents during 2016. The unfavorable exchange rate has been the main reason that sports leagues have been hesitant to expand into Canada, such as the NHL commissioner Gary Bettman league deferring Quebec City's bid to rejoin the NHL.

In 2011, the ownership group of the Canucks, now owned by Francesco Aquilini, announced they were considering purchasing the Hornets. In December 2010, the league bought the Hornets and considered moving them to solve to the club's financial difficulties. However, a Hornets move was effectively taken off the table in 2012 when Tom Benson, a New Orleans native who already owned the NFL's New Orleans Saints, purchased the team. One year later, Aquilini denied rumours that he wanted to purchase the Sacramento Kings from the Maloof family. Aquilini expressed that while Rogers Arena is ready for basketball, having the NBA in Vancouver comes down to market support, which his company assesses to see if it has improved since the Grizzlies left.

== See also ==
- Relocation of professional sports teams
- List of relocated National Basketball Association teams
