= Effect of Hurricane Katrina on the New Orleans Hornets =

Aftermath of hurricane in New Orleans Hornets

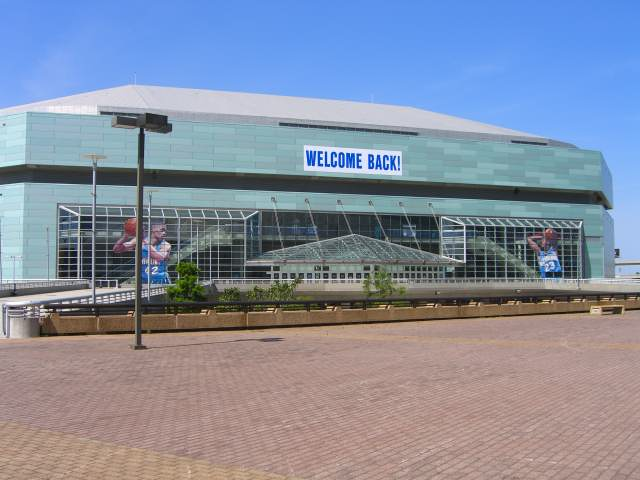
The New Orleans Arena in May 2006.

Hurricane Katrina devastated the city of New Orleans on August 29, 2005, and caused extensive damage to the New Orleans Arena. As a result, the National Basketball Association (NBA)'s New Orleans Hornets were unable to play any home games at the Arena for both the entire 2005–06 and 2006–07 seasons, and temporarily relocated to Oklahoma City, Oklahoma, to become the New Orleans/Oklahoma City Hornets. After playing the majority of home games for both the 2005–06 and 2006–07 seasons at the Ford Center in Oklahoma City, the Hornets returned to New Orleans for the 2007–08 season.

Following the success of the Hornets' tenure in the city, the Seattle SuperSonics relocated to Oklahoma City for the 2008–09 season, where they now compete as the Oklahoma City Thunder. As for the Hornets franchise, they changed their name to the Pelicans in 2013, paving the way for a return of the Hornets name to its original home of Charlotte, North Carolina, where it replaced the Bobcats name one year later.

== Response ==
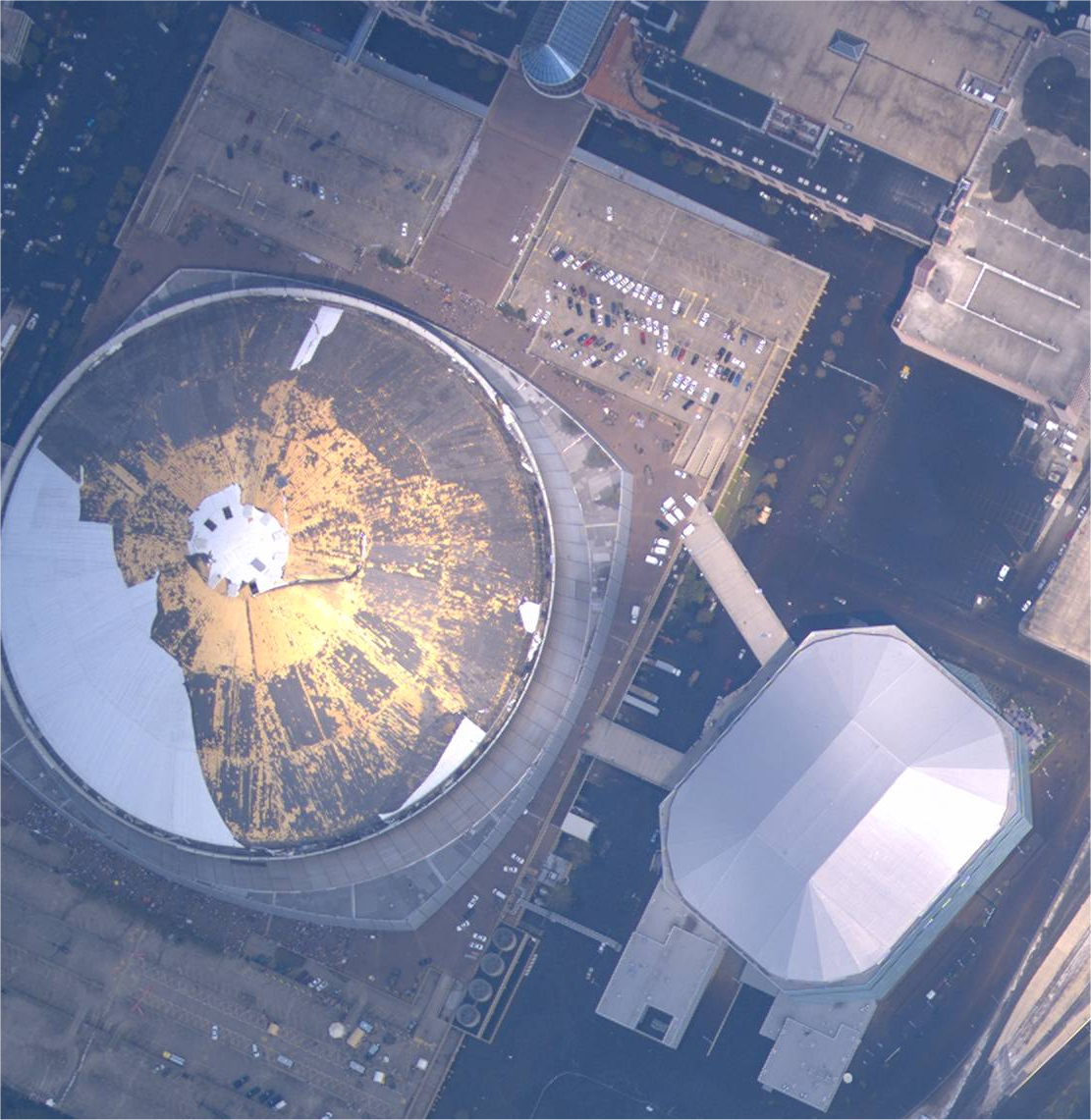
The New Orleans Arena at right following the storm.

Because of the extensive damage resulting from the hurricane, where the Hornets would play for the 2005–06 season came into question. Although the New Orleans Arena suffered only slight damage, the flooding surrounding the area made it impossible to use. With the training camp scheduled to begin on October 4, the team announced that the first three weeks of camp would be held at the Air Force Academy in Colorado Springs, Colorado, instead of their usual location, Alario Center in Westwego. Additionally the team stated that they wanted to play home games within Louisiana, at either the Pete Maravich Assembly Center or the Rivercenter in Baton Rouge. On September 3, Hornets owner George Shinn stated that the storm would not be used as a reason to permanently relocate the franchise.

By September 10, the prospect of securing a Baton Rouge location to host the Hornets was fading as a result of the facilities being utilized for hurricane related relief operations. Numerous cities inquired about hosting the franchise for the season, including Kansas City, Louisville, Nashville, Oklahoma City and San Diego. During this period, Oklahoma City announced that it was the favored choice to serve as the temporary home of the franchise, although by mid-September SMG announced that the New Orleans arena could potentially be ready for occupancy by the All-Star Game break. However, by late September the Hornets finalized a move to Oklahoma City, where 35 games would be played at the Ford Center, as well as six in Baton Rouge at the Pete Maravich Assembly Center. Additionally, it was announced that three of the games in March could be moved to New Orleans if the arena repairs were complete. At the same time, the NBA also announced the team would be referred to officially as the New Orleans/Oklahoma City Hornets, and that the deal reached with Oklahoma City would allow for the team to return for the 2006–07 season, if necessary.

== Delayed return ==
The club's logo featuring the Oklahoma City location wordmark, used from 2005 to 2007.

In order to allow for a full recovery of the New Orleans market in the wake of the storm, the NBA announced on January 31, 2006, that the Hornets would remain in Oklahoma City for the 2006–07 season and return for the 2007–08 season. The league also announced that New Orleans would play host for the 2008 All-Star Game, in addition to hosting the team for six of their 41 home games during the season.

Although guarantees by the league and organization indicated a return for 2007–08, many fans in New Orleans were still skeptical of a permanent return due to the popularity of the team in Oklahoma City. Meanwhile, the Hornets opened their season in Oklahoma City with a 26-point win over the Sacramento Kings on November 1, 2005. They played their first game in Louisiana in a loss to the Phoenix Suns on December 21, 2005, and they played the first professional sports event in New Orleans after Hurricane Katrina on March 8, 2006, where they lost to the Los Angeles Lakers.

The Hornets completed the 2005–06 season by winning 38 games, tenth in the Western Conference. They became the first team since the 1974–75 Boston Celtics to play home games at four separate venues: the Ford Center in Oklahoma City, the New Orleans Arena in New Orleans, the Pete Maravich Assembly Center in Baton Rouge, and the Lloyd Noble Center in Norman, Oklahoma. The Hornets had finished last in attendance in the previous season in New Orleans, but playing in Ford Center, they averaged 18,168 fans, a 78% increase. Referring to the fan support in Oklahoma City, Hornets star Chris Paul said that "You get a feeling you're a part of something special"; mayor Mick Cornett said, "My expectations were lofty, but we've exceeded them."

All repair work on the New Orleans Arena was finished by March 2006, and a new scoreboard and video displays were added during the process. In June 2006, Shinn stated he was pleased with the ongoing recovery process in New Orleans and again reaffirmed his desire to permanently return for the 2007–08 season. However, the Hornets also announced that they were in the process of negotiating with Oklahoma City to play the 2007–08 season at the Ford Center as a contingency plan. The Hornets opened the 2006–07 season at New Orleans with a win over the Boston Celtics. They improved their final record from the previous season by one game, and again finished tenth in the Western Conference, three games out of the playoffs. Their attendance declined slightly compared to the previous season, and they finished 15th overall in attendance.

The Hornets made their permanent return to New Orleans on October 31, 2007, when they defeated the Sacramento Kings 109–90 to open the 2007–08 season. In the following two seasons, the Hornets averaged an attendance of 15,574. During the 2008 All-Star Game, the NBA donated $5 million towards relief work, and staged an NBA Cares program throughout the city to help rebuilding efforts.

== See also ==
- 2020–21 Toronto Raptors season, another event of an NBA team temporarily displaced from their home city, in this instance due to the COVID-19 pandemic.
- Effect of Hurricane Katrina on the New Orleans Saints
