= Peter Ufford =

- Scientific career
- Institutions: Capilano University

Peter Ufford is the former Chancellor of Capilano University, which is located in the District of North Vancouver in British Columbia, Canada.
