= List of relocated NBA teams =

Teams with the National Basketball Association (NBA), a professional men's basketball league in North America, have moved between cities some two dozen times. This list contains current franchises in the NBA. It does not include name changes.

First	First year in original city
Last	Last year in original city
Win%	Winning percentage
PA	NBA Playoffs appearances
C	Championship titles
^	City later received a new franchise
*	Later moved again

== Permanent moves ==
Team	Founded	Moved	Moved to	Seasons	Win%	PA	C	Main reason	Ref
Tri-Cities Blackhawks	1949	1951	Milwaukee Hawks*	2	.409	1	0	Small city	
Milwaukee Hawks^	1951	1955	St. Louis Hawks*	4	.324	0	0		
Fort Wayne Pistons	1948	1957	Detroit Pistons	9	.506	8	0	Small city	
Rochester Royals	1948	1957	Cincinnati Royals*	9	.576	7	1	Lack of profitability	
Minneapolis Lakers^	1948	1960	Los Angeles Lakers	12	.545	11	5	Poor attendance	
Philadelphia Warriors^	1946	1962	San Francisco Warriors	16	.506	12	2	Sold to San Francisco owner	
Chicago Zephyrs^	1961	1963	Baltimore Bullets*	2	.269	0	0		
Syracuse Nationals	1949	1963	Philadelphia 76ers	14	.569	14	1		
St. Louis Hawks	1955	1968	Atlanta Hawks	13	.550	12	1	Sold to Atlanta owners	
New Jersey Americans	1967	1968	New York Nets*	1		0	0	Overbooked play location	
San Diego Rockets^	1967	1971	Houston Rockets	4	.363	1	0	(Note: Sold to Houston ownership group after original owner Robert Breitbard came under financial distress due to tax assessment issues surrounding the arena he developed, the San Diego International Sports Center)	
Cincinnati Royals	1957	1972	Kansas City–Omaha Kings*	15	.467	7	0		
Baltimore Bullets	1963	1973	Capital Bullets	10	.493	7	0	(Note: The Capital Bullets were later renamed Washington Bullets (1974–1997) and Washington Wizards (since 1997). Despite moving, the team would play a few home games in Baltimore from 1989 to 1997.)	
Kansas City–Omaha Kings	1972	1975	Kansas City Kings*	3	.459	1	0	Moved all games to Kansas City	
New York Nets	1968	1977	New Jersey Nets*	8		1	0	NBA-ABA Merger, poor attendance	
Buffalo Braves	1970	1978	San Diego Clippers*	8	.395	3	0	(Note: Sale to California owner Irv Levin, who previously owned the Boston Celtics and swapped franchises with Braves owner John Y. Brown Jr.)	
New Orleans Jazz^	1974	1979	Utah Jazz	5	.393	0	0	Lack of profitability	
San Diego Clippers	1978	1984	Los Angeles Clippers	6	.378	0	0	(Note: Sold to Donald Sterling, who wanted the team in his hometown and eventually succeeded in moving. In 2024, the Clippers' NBA G League team moved from Ontario, California to San Diego, adopting the San Diego Clippers branding.)	
Kansas City Kings	1975	1985	Sacramento Kings	10	.465	4	0	Low attendance	
Vancouver Grizzlies	1995	2001	Memphis Grizzlies	6	.220	0	0	(Note: Financial problems caused by low attendance and the weak Canadian dollar; sold to Michael Heisley with the intention of moving the team to Memphis.)	
Charlotte Hornets^	1988	2002	New Orleans Hornets	14	.485	7	0	(Note: Declining attendance, reported lack of profitability, and the declining popularity of owner George Shinn. This move was reversed retroactively in 2014 when the newly rebranded Charlotte Hornets (founded as the Bobcats in 2004) was awarded the history and records of the original Hornets in Charlotte from 1988 to 2002, while retroactively suspending operations from 2002 to 2004. The now-New Orleans Pelicans (rebranded from the Hornets in 2013) kept the history and records of the team in New Orleans from 2002 onward, but were retroactively reclassified as an expansion team.)	
Seattle SuperSonics	1967	2008	Oklahoma City Thunder	41	.524	22	1	(Note: Financial problems exacerbated by the failure to provide funds for a new arena in Seattle; sold to Clay Bennett in 2006 who concealed the intention of moving the team to Oklahoma City. As part of a settlement with the city of Seattle, all colors, logos and trademarks associated with the SuperSonics were kept in Seattle. The NBA continues to acknowledge the SuperSonics and Thunder as one continuous franchise; however, the Thunder do not include any pre-2008 statistics and records in their media guides, nor do they acknowledge the SuperSonics' 1979 NBA championship as part of its history. Should a future expansion Seattle franchise join the NBA, that franchise will inherit the pre-2008 statistics and records from the Thunder, while retroactively reclassifying the Thunder as a 2008 expansion team.)	
New Jersey Nets	1977	2012	Brooklyn Nets	35	-	-	-	(Note: Nets former owner Bruce Ratner bought them to move them to their new arena in Brooklyn, which is within 14 miles of its former arena in East Rutherford, New Jersey, both of which are in the same New York Metropolitan Area)	

== Temporary moves ==
Team	Founded	Moved	Moved to	Returned	Main reason	Ref
New Orleans Hornets	2002	2005	Oklahoma City	2007	(Note: Damage to the New Orleans metropolitan area caused by Hurricane Katrina forced the Hornets to play most of their home games in Oklahoma City as the New Orleans/Oklahoma City Hornets. The Hornets returned to New Orleans after repairs to the team's home arena were completed. The team was later renamed the New Orleans Pelicans (since 2013) and subsequently returned the Hornets brand to the NBA, which was reclaimed by the new Charlotte team (originally Bobcats) in 2014. Oklahoma City would later be the site for a permanent location, as the Seattle SuperSonics moved there in 2008 and became the Oklahoma City Thunder.)	
Toronto Raptors	1995	2020	Tampa	2021	(Note: The Raptors played their home games at Amalie Arena in Tampa, Florida, home of the Tampa Bay Lightning of the National Hockey League, during their 2020–21 season, as a result of COVID-19 cross-border travel restrictions imposed by the Government of Canada. They returned to Toronto the following season.)	

== See also ==
- List of defunct NBA teams
