= Seattle SuperSonics relocation to Oklahoma City =

NBA franchise relocation

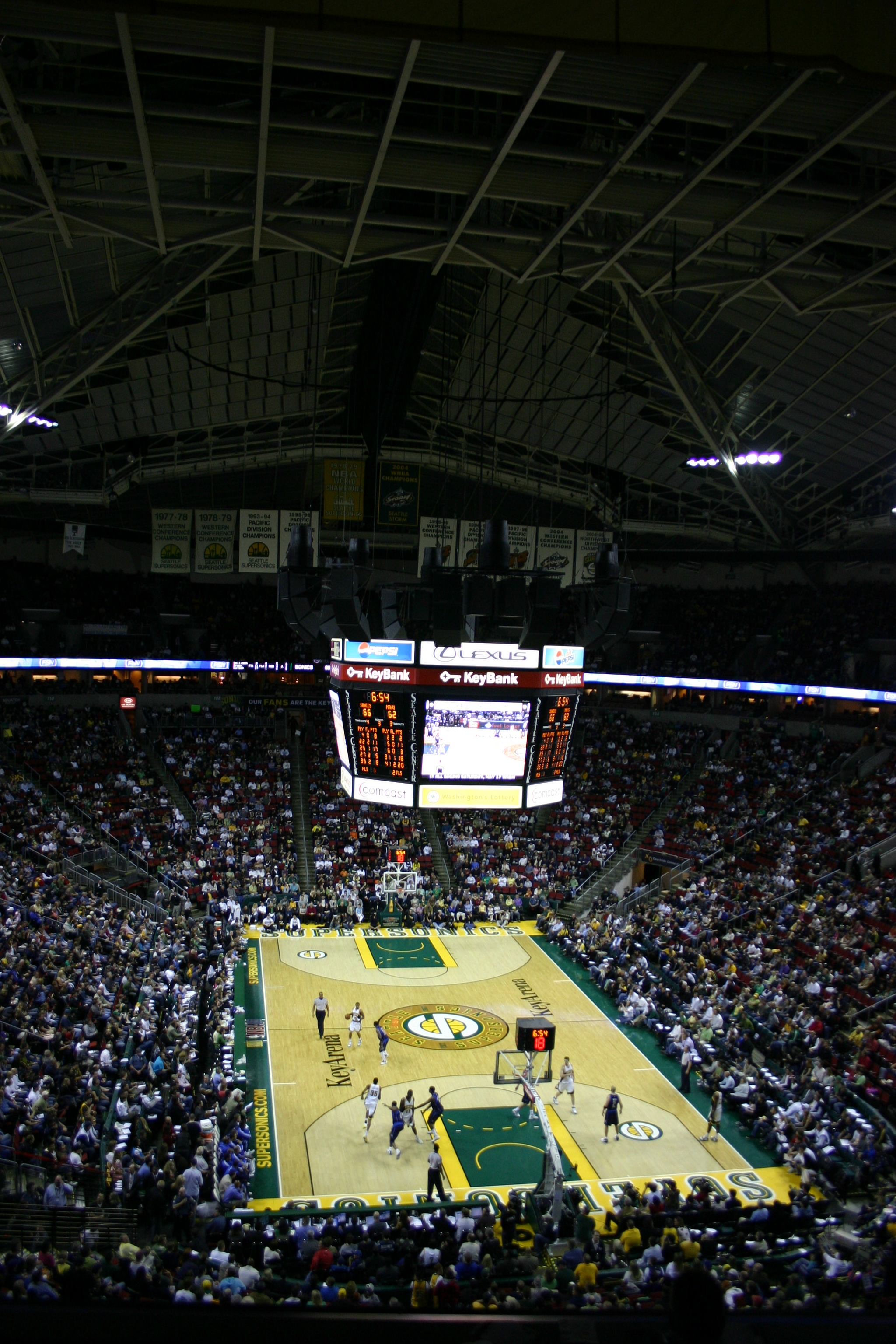
The interior of KeyArena during the SuperSonics' final home game in Seattle, which was played against the Dallas Mavericks.

On July 2, 2008, the Seattle SuperSonics, an American professional basketball team that competed in the National Basketball Association (NBA), moved from its original city of Seattle to Oklahoma City. The team began to play as the Oklahoma City Thunder in the 2008–09 NBA season. The SuperSonics were the third NBA team to move from one metropolitan area to another in the 2000s.

After the SuperSonics' ownership group, led by Howard Schultz, failed to persuade Washington state government officials to provide $220 million in public funding to update KeyArena, Schultz sold the team to the Professional Basketball Club LLC (PBC), an investment group headed by Oklahoma City businessman Clay Bennett. A condition of the sale was that PBC execute a "good-faith effort" to secure a suitable arena in the Seattle area for the team. The new owners failed to persuade local governments to pay for a new $500 million arena complex, and consequently announced that they intended to move the team to Oklahoma City. When they sought to be released from the lease that required the SuperSonics to play in KeyArena through 2010, a judge rejected the request and Seattle sued Bennett's group to enforce the lease. On July 2, 2008, a settlement was reached: among other conditions, PBC would pay $45 million to break the lease plus $30 million if Seattle had no replacement team after five years.

In months before the settlement, Seattle officials released emails exchanged by members of Bennett's ownership group, alleging that they indicated that some members intended to move the team to Oklahoma City all along, and had not negotiated in good faith. As a result, Schultz sued to rescind the sale and transfer the team to a court-appointed receiver. He dropped the suit after the NBA noted that he had signed a binding contract not to sue Bennett's group and argued that his proposal would violate league ownership rules.

In 2019, Schultz said, "Selling the Sonics as I did is one of the biggest regrets of my professional life. I should have been willing to lose money until a local buyer emerged. I am forever sorry."

== Sale of team ==
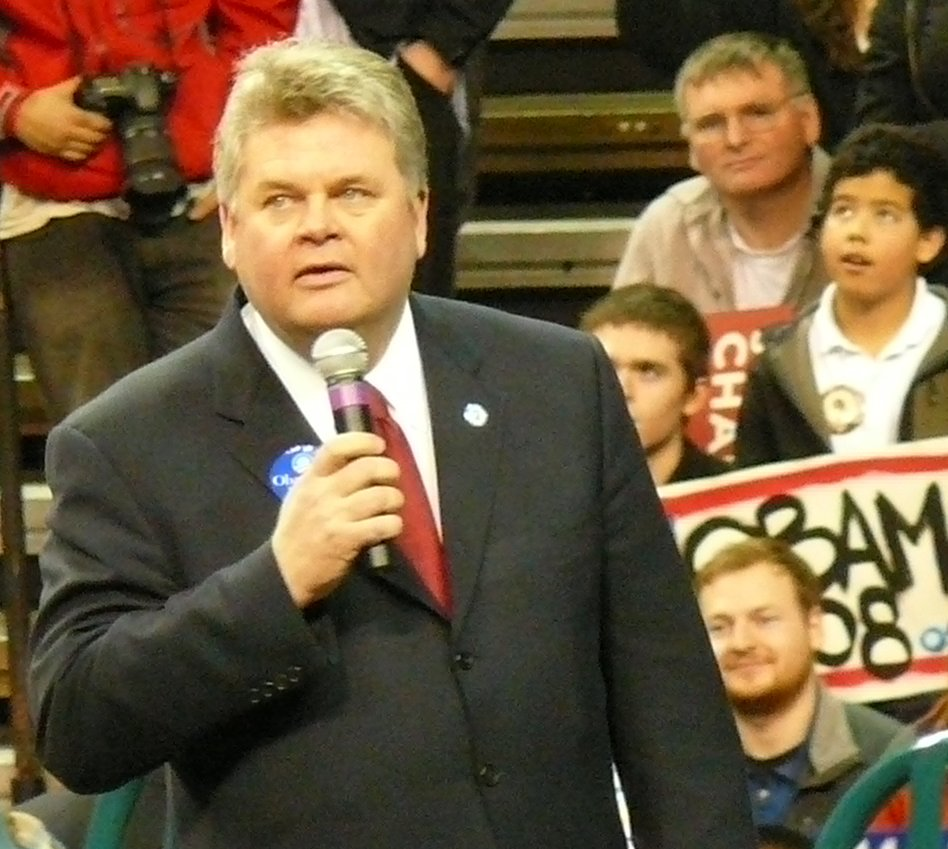
After the sale of the SuperSonics, Seattle Mayor Greg Nickels pledged he would fight to keep the team from moving to Oklahoma City.

In 2001, ownership of the Seattle SuperSonics was transferred from Barry Ackerley to Starbucks CEO Howard Schultz. In the next five years, the team suffered heavy financial losses due to Schultz's plan to sell, which led him to seek funding from the Washington State Legislature for a newer, more modern arena in the Puget Sound region to replace KeyArena at Seattle Center. On July 18, 2006, the Basketball Club of Seattle, led by Schultz, sold the SuperSonics and its sister team, the Women's National Basketball Association (WNBA)'s Seattle Storm, after failing to persuade the city of Seattle to fund a $220 million expansion of KeyArena. KeyArena, remodeled in 1995, was the NBA's smallest venue, with a seating capacity of 17,072. After failing to find a local ownership group to buy the team, Schultz talked to ownership groups from Kansas City, St. Louis, Las Vegas, San Jose, and Anaheim before agreeing to sell the team to an ownership group from Oklahoma City, which pursued an NBA franchise after hosting the New Orleans Hornets franchise for two seasons as the city of New Orleans rebuilt from Hurricane Katrina. The sale to Clay Bennett's ownership group for $350 million was approved by NBA owners on October 24, 2006. Terms of the sale required the new owners to "use good-faith best efforts" for 12 months to secure a new arena lease or venue in the Seattle metropolitan area. Further complicating matters, the voters of Seattle passed Initiative 91, a measure that virtually prohibited the use of public money on sporting arenas. This lack of government financial support for the team, combined with earlier losses under recent ownership groups, "likely doomed the Sonics' future in the city", a local newspaper wrote.

On February 12, 2007, Bennett proposed using public money to pay for a new $500 million arena in Renton, Washington, a suburb of Seattle. After failing to reach a deal by the end of the legislative session, Bennett gave up his attempt in April 2007. On November 2, 2007, the team announced it would move to Oklahoma City as soon as it could get out of its KeyArena lease. Seattle's mayor, Greg Nickels, said the SuperSonics were expected to stay in Seattle until their lease expired in 2010 and that the city did not intend to make it easy for Bennett to move the team early. Over concerns the city would accept a buyout of the lease, a grassroots group filed a citywide initiative that sought to prevent the city from accepting such an offer from Bennett's group. The Seattle City Council later unanimously passed an ordinance modeled after the initiative.

On August 13, 2007, Aubrey McClendon, a minor partner of Bennett's ownership group, told The Journal Record, an Oklahoma City newspaper, that the group bought the team with intentions to move to Oklahoma City. Bennett later denied such intentions, saying McClendon "was not speaking on behalf of the ownership group". The NBA fined McClendon $250,000 for his comments. In 2019, Schultz said, "Selling the Sonics as I did is one of the biggest regrets of my professional life. I should have been willing to lose money until a local buyer emerged."

== Effort to move ==
On September 21, 2007, Bennett applied for arbitration on the issue of whether the team could break its lease in 2008. Three days later, the city filed for declaratory relief, arguing that the lease did not allow for arbitration on the issue of occupancy. The motion asked the King County Superior Court to reject the arbitration request and enforce the Specific Performance Clause of the SuperSonics' lease, which required the team to play at KeyArena through 2010. United States District Court Judge Ricardo Martinez denied the request for arbitration on October 29, saying that the "arguments ignore the clear language of Article II, which states that PBC’s use and occupancy rights with respect to the Premises and the Term of this Agreement shall end on September 30, 2010.”

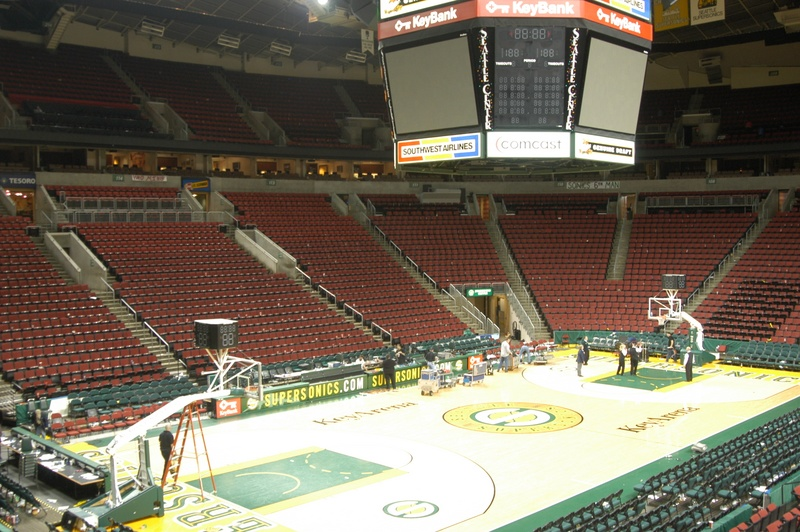
KeyArena, rebuilt in 1995, was the smallest venue in the NBA at the time of the SuperSonics' move, seating 17,072 for basketball.

Two days after Bennett's October 31, 2007, deadline passed for public financing of a new arena, he informed NBA commissioner David Stern that the ownership group intended to move the SuperSonics to Oklahoma City as soon as it was legally possible. The timing of the announcement, one day after the SuperSonics' home opener, was criticized by Tom Carr, Seattle's attorney: "Mr. Bennett's announcement today is a transparent attempt to alienate the Seattle fan base and follow through on his plan to move the team to Oklahoma City...Making this move now continues the current ownership's insulting behavior toward the Sonics' dedicated fans and the citizens of the city." Bennett also reiterated that the team was not for sale and dismissed attempts by local groups to repurchase the team.

On February 15, 2008, the SuperSonics' ownership group gave the city of Seattle a one-day deadline to accept a $26.5 million offer that would buy out the SuperSonics' lease in KeyArena and pay off what the ownership group claimed was the value of debts on the arena. The city rejected the offer.

The prospect of expanding KeyArena resurfaced on March 6, 2008, when then-Microsoft CEO Steve Ballmer promised that his investor group would pay half of the $300 million needed for an extensive renovation if the city and county would provide the rest. However, when the state legislature did not give approval for the county to provide funds by an April 10 deadline, Seattle Mayor Greg Nickels said that the effort had failed and the city's hopes rested in its lawsuit.

=== Oklahoma City's preparations ===
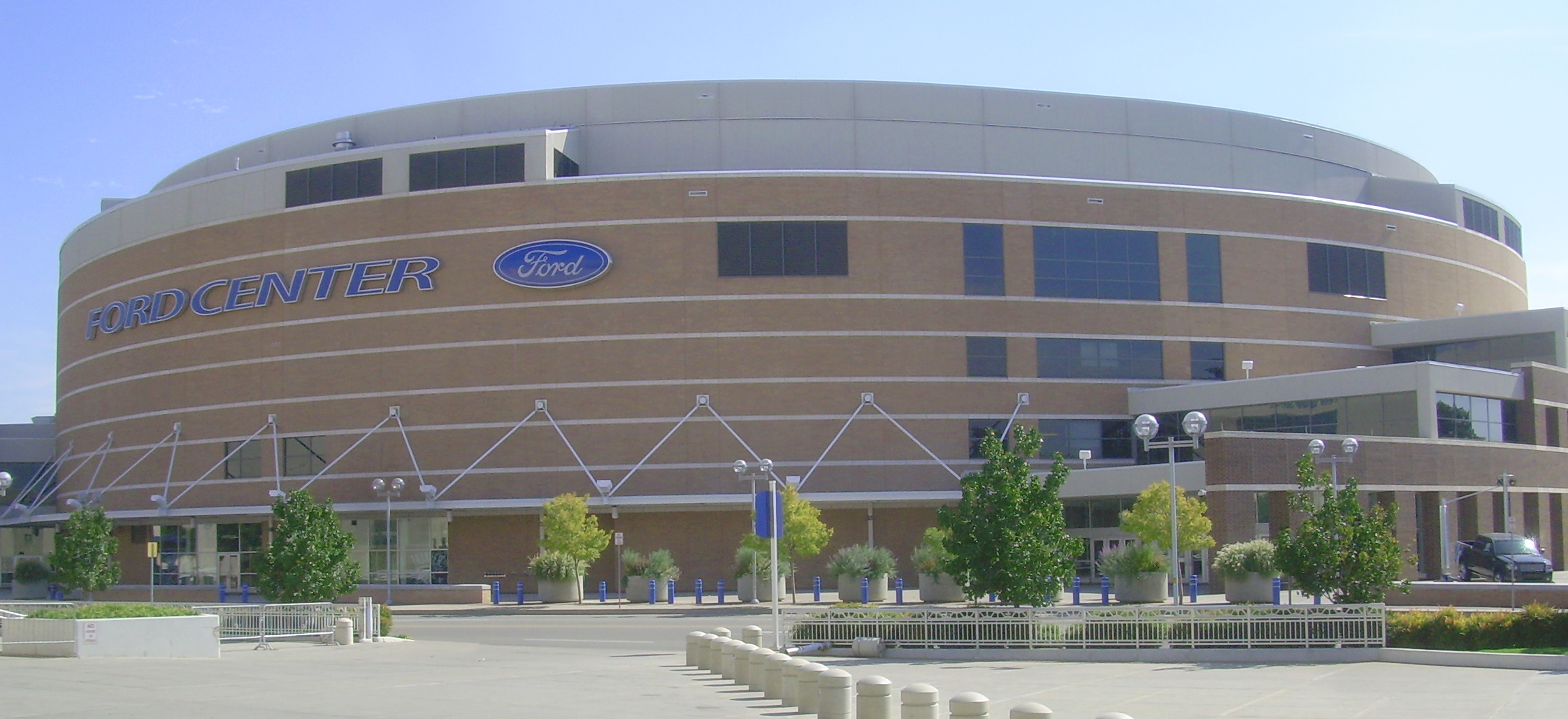
Paycom Center (then known as the Ford Center), which seats 18,203 for basketball, was completed in 2002, and has received public funding for renovation.

In anticipation of an NBA team, and led by Mayor Mick Cornett, who had won the previous temporary move of the New Orleans Hornets to Oklahoma City, the voters of that city approved a $120 million renovation of the Ford Center on March 3, 2008, including construction of a new NBA practice facility. After a tour of downtown Oklahoma City, a subcommittee of three NBA owners recommended that the league approve the move. On March 14, Bennett reached a preliminary agreement with Oklahoma City on a 15-year lease of the Ford Center that was finalized by the Oklahoma City Council and the SuperSonics' ownership group two weeks later. The Oklahoma State Legislature later approved a bill to provide tax breaks and other incentives if the team moved.

On April 18, NBA owners voted 28-2 to approve a potential SuperSonics move to Oklahoma City; only Mark Cuban of the Dallas Mavericks and Paul Allen of the Portland Trail Blazers voted against the move. The approval meant the SuperSonics would be allowed to move to Oklahoma City's Ford Center for the 2008–2009 season after reaching a settlement with the city of Seattle.

=== Popular opposition in Seattle ===
In 2006, a group of Seattle residents created Save Our Sonics and Storm ("SOS") to rally support for a permanent professional basketball presence in Seattle. The "and Storm" portion of the name was dropped when the WNBA Storm was sold to local ownership. On June 16, 2008, the group organized a well-publicized rally, which reportedly drew over 3,000 participants, at the U.S. District Courthouse in Seattle to protest the team's proposed move. The rally was held on the first day of the city of Seattle's lawsuit against the PBC to enforce the remaining two years on the KeyArena lease.

== Lawsuits ==
=== City of Seattle v. Professional Basketball Club LLC ===
Seattle filed a lawsuit on September 23, 2007, in an attempt to keep the SuperSonics from leaving before the end of their lease in 2010. The trial was set for June 16, 2008. On April 10, 2008, Seattle asked the federal district court to order the NBA to release documents related to the financial situation of each of its teams, the claim that the SuperSonics' lease with KeyArena was financially unworkable, and the league's involvement in requiring PBC to make a good-faith effort to stay in Seattle. On April 28, the trial's presiding judge, Loretta Preska, ruled that the NBA must supply the documents, adding that commissioner Stern could be deposed if the need arose. The city hoped the documents would help build its legal case, and cited an email conversation among members of the ownership group that suggested they were privately discussing intenions to move the team while publicly insisting that they would not attempt to do so.

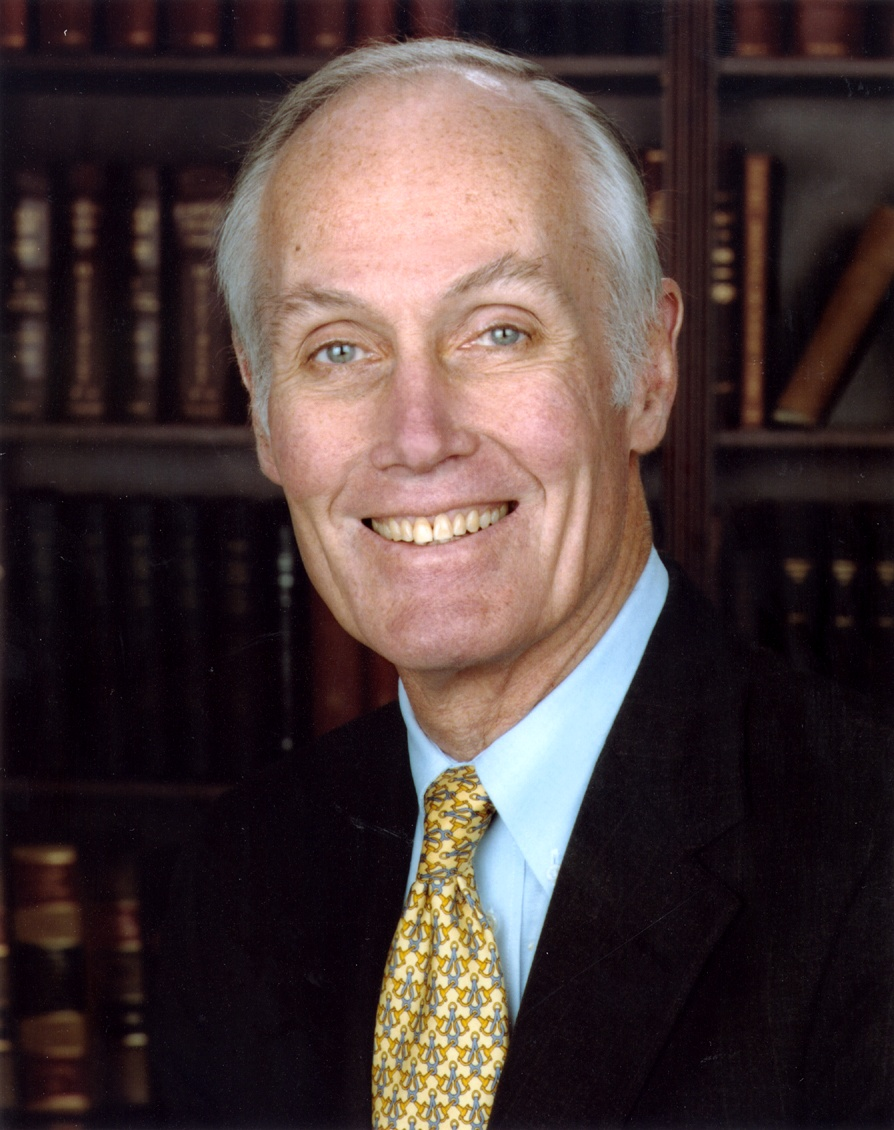
Slade Gorton, a former U.S. Senator from Washington, represented Seattle as their attorney.

The ownership group filed a motion saying that the lawsuit and the release of the emails by the city were meant to drive up the cost of leaving Seattle and force the ownership group to sell the team. The motion requested that all emails and other records be released to the team. Slade Gorton, lead attorney for the city, responded by pointing out that PBC that started the fight that led to the lawsuit when they filed for arbitration to break the lease. The motion was denied by the presiding judge, who said the team failed to make a "good-faith effort" to resolve the dispute and that it failed to show that trial preparations were hindered by the records not being made public. However, the ruling also said the team could bring up the issue again if it could prove the relevance or the confidentiality of the records.

On April 21, 2008, Gorton said he would be open to a settlement if the league promised a replacement team for Seattle. He said it was "highly unlikely" that the SuperSonics would stay and indicated the city should instead focus on gaining a replacement team, but noted that local governments would need to be willing to fund an expansion of KeyArena first.

When Bennett's group requested that the trial also decide the team's financial obligations to KeyArena should its lease be broken, Seattle's lawyers requested a six-month delay in the trial date in order to prepare for the additional issues, arguing that the ownership group's request would "dramatically change the scope" of the case and would require considerable preparation time to determine damages. The trial's presiding judge denied the motion by Bennett's group on March 6, noting that the team would have needed to make the request at the scheduling conference. A second trial would therefore need to have been held to determine the team's financial obligations.

Attorneys made their closing arguments in the city's case on June 26 and Judge Marsha J. Pechman announced that she would issue her ruling on the following Wednesday. On July 2, hours before Judge Pechman was to release her ruling, it was announced that the team and the city had reached a settlement where PBC would pay the city $45 million immediately in exchange for breaking the lease, and an additional $30 million if Seattle was not given a replacement team in five years. According to the conditions of the settlement, the SuperSonics' name and colors could not be used by the team in Oklahoma City, but could be taken by a future team in Seattle, although no promises for a replacement team were given. The Oklahoma City team would retain the franchise history of the SuperSonics, which could be "shared" with any future NBA team in Seattle until that time comes. In this case, OKC will return the latter artifacts back to the new Seattle team and relinquish their pre-move history to the new team. The team moved to Oklahoma City immediately and announced it would begin play in the 2008–09 season.

=== Basketball Club of Seattle LLC v. Professional Basketball Club LLC ===
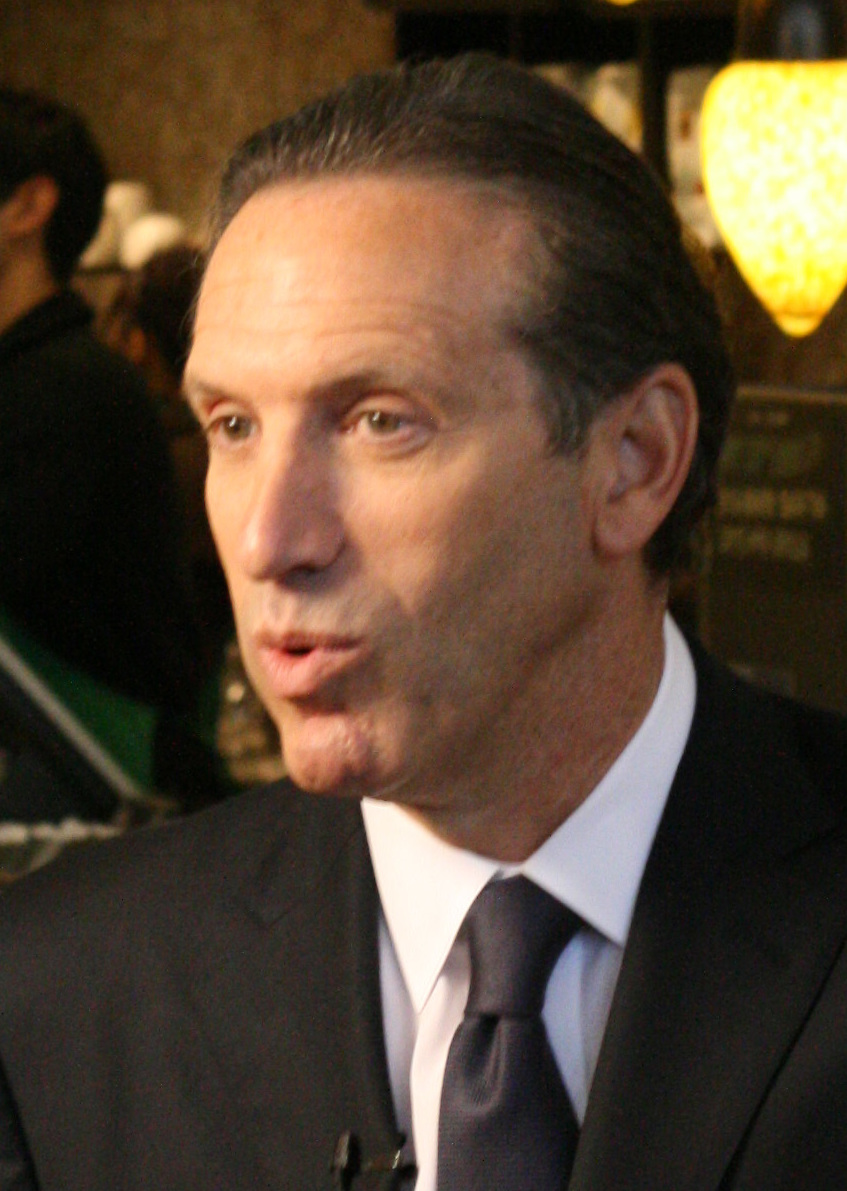
Starbucks Chairman and CEO Howard Schultz, who led the Basketball Club of Seattle, sold the SuperSonics to Clay Bennett in 2006. He was sued for breach of contract in 2008, after Schultz's attorneys accused Bennett of misrepresenting himself.

The release of email conversations between members of Bennett's group prompted former SuperSonics' owner Howard Schultz to file a lawsuit that sought to rescind the sale of the team and alleged that Bennett's group used fraud and misrepresentation to purchase the SuperSonics without making a "good faith best effort" to keep them in Seattle as mandated by the original sales contract. Bennett said the emails were misinterpreted and that he had spent millions of dollars in attempting to keep the team in Seattle.

The lawsuit was filed on April 22, 2008, at the U.S. District Court for the Western District of Washington. It sought, among other things, an injunction to prevent the SuperSonics from being moved from Seattle to Oklahoma City. The suit further requested that the franchise be placed in a constructive trust and no longer in the ownership of PBC. On May 20, 2008, Schultz's attorney added alleged a breach of contract as a third cause of action against Bennett. Chicago-based attorney and ESPN senior writer Lester Munson said that while the remedies Schultz sought were "without precedent in the sports industry", he did believe that both the Schultz case and Seattle's lease case presented "serious problems" for Bennett.

On May 9, 2008, Oklahoma City officials declared intent to sue for damages and a forced move of the SuperSonics if Schultz's lawsuit succeeded and the subsequent ownership did not move. In a legal letter to Schultz, Oklahoma City's attorney said that the SuperSonics were legally bound to move to Oklahoma City at the end of the KeyArena lease regardless of who owned the team. The letter stated that the city had "valid and enforceable agreements with the Team requiring it relocate to Oklahoma City at the end of the current lease with the city of Seattle." Schultz's attorney replied to the letter saying the lease agreement was with PBC, not BCOS, and that the city began improvements on Ford Center at their own risk before the conclusion of the pending litigation.

The NBA filed a motion to intervene with Seattle's federal court on July 9, 2008, claiming that Schultz's lawsuit would interfere with the stable operation of the franchise and the transfer of ownership would violate NBA regulations unless the team was put under control of NBA Commissioner David Stern. The league also claimed that Schultz signed a release forbidding him to sue Bennett's ownership group as a condition of the NBA's approval of the original sale. Weeks later, Schultz requested that two separate trials be used to determine whether Bennett's group committed fraud and subsequently determine a remedy. On August 29, 2008, shortly after the court denied his request and ruled that the NBA could intervene in the case, Schultz said his legal team no longer believed the case could be won. He announced he would drop the lawsuit, saying in a prepared statement, "The prevailing wisdom of many in the Seattle community and the advice of key members of the BCOS is that Seattle's best chance for a professional basketball franchise is to end this litigation and allow the City, State Legislature and other parties to begin the necessary fence mending with the NBA."

== Distribution of assets ==
Under the settlement agreement, any items associated with the SuperSonics' history in Seattle, including trophies, banners, and retired jerseys, stayed in the city and were placed in the Museum of History & Industry (MOHAI). Other items such as televisions, radios, headphones, CDs, chairs, and equipment were shipped to Oklahoma City after the Seattle Storm finished the 2008 WNBA season.

== Chronicles ==
In 2009, Seattle-based filmmakers released Sonicsgate, a documentary chronicling the history of the SuperSonics, especially the team's move to Oklahoma City.

In 2012, the book Big League City: Oklahoma City's Rise to the NBA by now mayor David Holt chronicled the story from Oklahoma City's perspective.

In 2025, a 9-episode podcast by The Ringer examined the SuperSonics' move.

== See also ==
- Relocation of professional sports teams
- List of relocated NBA teams
