= Darrick Martin =

American basketball player (born 1971)

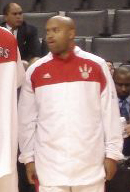

Personal information
- Born: March 6, 1971 (age 55) Denver, Colorado, U.S.
- Listed height: 5 ft 11 in (1.80 m)
- Listed weight: 170 lb (77 kg)

Career information
- High school: St. Anthony (Long Beach, California)
- College: UCLA (1988–1992)
- NBA draft: 1992: undrafted
- Playing career: 1994–2009
- Position: Point guard
- Number: 15, 5, 2
- Coaching career: 2016–2018

Career history

Playing
- 1994–1995: Sioux Falls Skyforce
- 1995: Minnesota Timberwolves
- 1995–1996: Vancouver Grizzlies
- 1996: Minnesota Timberwolves
- 1996–1999: Los Angeles Clippers
- 1999–2001: Sacramento Kings
- 2001: Dallas Mavericks
- 2002: Avtodor Saratov
- 2002–2003: Yakima Sun Kings
- 2003: Scafati Basket
- 2003: Harlem Globetrotters
- 2003–2004: Sioux Falls Skyforce
- 2004: Minnesota Timberwolves
- 2005: Los Angeles Clippers
- 2005–2008: Toronto Raptors
- 2009: Los Angeles Lightning

Coaching
- 2016–2018: Reno Bighorns

Career highlights
- CBA champion (2003); CBA Playoff/Finals MVP (2003); All-CBA First Team (1995); First-team Parade All-American (1988); McDonald's All-American (1988)

Career NBA statistics
- Points: 3,525 (6.9 ppg)
- Rebounds: 588 (1.1 rpg)
- Assists: 1,475 (2.9 apg)
- Stats at NBA.com
- Stats at Basketball Reference
Medals
Men's basketball
Representing United States
FIBA Americas U18 Championship
Gold medal – first place	1990 Montevideo	Team competition

Darrick David Martin (born March 6, 1971) is an American former professional basketball player in the National Basketball Association (NBA). He played college basketball for the UCLA Bruins. Martin played professionally for over a decade, shuttling between NBA and the Continental Basketball Association (CBA), where he won the 2003 CBA Playoffs MVP. In 2003, he even played for the Harlem Globetrotters. He then went on to play for the Los Angeles Lightning of the Independent Basketball Association (IBL). He was named the head coach of the Reno Bighorns of the NBA G League in 2016.

== High school honors and collegiate history ==
As a senior at St. Anthony High School, Martin was a Parade First-Team All-American and named to the McDonald's High School All-American team.

Martin received a full scholarship from the University of California, Los Angeles, and played on a Bruins squad with future NBA players Don MacLean, Tracy Murray and Mitchell Butler. As a quick point guard, he completed his college career at UCLA in 1992 ranked second in school history in both assists (636) and steals (179) behind Pooh Richardson. Martin's career assists total placed him fourth on the Pacific-10 Conference's all-time list. He averaged 9.3 points and 4.9 assists in his four years at UCLA. As a junior, he averaged a career-high 11.6 points and 6.8 assists, and his assists average was the best in the Pac-10 and the 16th highest in the country. His single-season high of 217 assists was second all-time at UCLA to Richardson's 236.

== Professional career ==
=== Pre-NBA career ===
The 5'11" point guard was not drafted by an NBA franchise and instead played for the CBA's Sioux Falls Skyforce, (where he was the league's 10th leading scorer with 21 points per game). He was selected to the CBA All-League Second Team in 1995. He signed two consecutive 10-day contracts with the NBA's Minnesota Timberwolves in February 1995. He returned to the Timberwolves for the 2003–04 NBA season as a backup for Sam Cassell after Troy Hudson was injured.

=== Vancouver Grizzlies ===
At the beginning of the 1995–96 NBA season he signed with the Vancouver Grizzlies as a free agent, but the Grizzlies traded him back to the Timberwolves two months later, in exchange for a second-round draft pick. His scoring average in these first two seasons remained at about seven points per game.

=== Los Angeles Clippers ===
Martin signed with the Los Angeles Clippers in 1996 and remained with them for three seasons, averaging ten points per game in (and playing all 82 games of) the first two of them.

He returned to the Clippers in the 2004–05 season and averaged 3.8 PPG.

=== Sacramento Kings ===
Martin's contract expired once again after the lockout-shortened 1999 season, and he signed with Sacramento Kings where he would spend the next two years. Late in the Kings' 130–109 win over the Dallas Mavericks on March 6, 2000, Martin came off the bench to score 11 points in only two minutes. He was given the nickname "The Domino" by his teammates.

=== CBA ===
Martin won a Continental Basketball Association (CBA) championship with the Yakima Sun Kings in 2003.

=== Toronto Raptors ===
Martin signed with the Toronto Raptors for the 2005–06 season. In his first year with the club he posted 2.6 ppg and 1.4 apg in 8.5 mpg of play. Martin's primary role with the Raptors, according to head coach Sam Mitchell, was to provide guidance to the younger players on the team such as point guards T. J. Ford and José Calderón. Darrick's most notable moment in a Raptors uniform was a 3-pointer against the Dallas Mavericks on November 29, 2006. With over a second remaining in regulation, and the Raptors trailing by 22 points, Martin hoisted up a 3-point shot uncontested and successfully sunk the shot. With the Raptors NBA record consecutive game streak with a 3-pointer on the verge of ending, Martin's shot enabled the Raptors to extend the streak which ended January 24, 2011. After two and a half seasons with Toronto, Martin was waived on March 27, 2008, to open up a spot on the roster for Linton Johnson. Though waived by the Raptors, Martin stayed with the team as an informal assistant coach/consultant.

== NBA career statistics ==
Legend
GP	Games played	GS	Games started	MPG	Minutes per game
FG%	Field goal percentage	3P%	3-point field goal percentage	FT%	Free throw percentage
RPG	Rebounds per game	APG	Assists per game	SPG	Steals per game
BPG	Blocks per game	PPG	Points per game	**Bold**	Career high
*	Led the league

=== Regular season ===
Year	Team	GP	GS	MPG	FG%	3P%	FT%	RPG	APG	SPG	BPG	PPG
1994–95	Minnesota	34	9	23.6	.408	.184	.877	1.9	3.9	1.0	.0	7.5
1995–96	Vancouver	24	0	16.8	**.450**	.227	.826	1.6	2.5	1.1	.0	6.7
1995–96	Minnesota	35	16	21.3	.381	.319	.851	1.3	**4.5**	.7	**.1**	7.3
1996–97	L.A. Clippers	**82**	**64**	22.2	.407	.389	.872	1.4	4.1	.7	.0	**10.9**
1997–98	L.A. Clippers	**82***	63	**28.0**	.377	.365	.848	**2.0**	4.0	1.0	**.1**	10.3
1998–99	L.A. Clippers	37	25	25.4	.367	.292	.803	1.3	3.9	**1.2**	**.1**	8.0
1999–00	Sacramento	71	1	12.6	.380	.306	.824	.6	1.7	.4	.0	5.7
2000–01	Sacramento	31	0	5.6	.382	**.519**	.886	.5	.5	.2	.0	3.3
2001–02	Dallas	3	0	7.5	.000	.000	.500	.3	1.0	.7	.0	.3
2003–04	Minnesota	16	0	10.7	.299	.231	**1.000**	.4	1.4	.1	**.1**	3.4
2004–05	L.A. Clippers	11	0	17.3	.320	.278	.625	.9	2.5	.5	.0	3.8
2005–06	Toronto	40	0	8.5	.351	.400	.750	.5	1.4	.4	.0	2.6
2006–07	Toronto	31	0	7.1	.351	.351	.714	.4	1.4	.1	.0	3.0
2007–08	Toronto	17	0	8.3	.233	.125	.833	.4	1.2	.4	.0	1.6
Career		514	178	17.8	.382	.340	.843	1.1	2.9	.7	.0	6.9

=== Playoffs ===
Year	Team	GP	GS	MPG	FG%	3P%	FT%	RPG	APG	SPG	BPG	PPG
1997	L.A. Clippers	3	**3**	**25.7**	**.440**	**.556**	.667	.7	**4.3**	.0	.0	**11.0**
2000	Sacramento	2	0	10.5	.333	.333	.750	**1.5**	1.0	**.5**	.0	5.0
2001	Sacramento	2	0	4.5	.000	.000	–	.0	1.5	.0	.0	.0
2004	Minnesota	**16**	**3**	11.4	.275	.300	.800	.9	1.4	.3	.0	3.1
2007	Toronto	2	0	4.1	.000	.000	**1.000**	.5	1.0	.0	.0	1.0
Career		25	6	11.9	.301	.333	.771	.8	1.7	.2	.0	3.8

== Later work ==
In November 2009, Martin returned to his first NBA team, the Minnesota Timberwolves, as the assistant director of player development.

In 2012, Martin was named an assistant coach of the St. John's Red Storm men's basketball team, working under head coach Steve Lavin.

On October 27, 2015, it was announced that he had been hired as the radio analyst for the UCLA Bruins on the UCLA Bruins IMG Sports network, replacing Tracy Murray.

On June 22, 2016, Martin was named the head coach of the Reno Bighorns of the NBA Development League. When the team relocated to become the Stockton Kings, he was not retained.
