= 1996–97 Portland Trail Blazers season =

NBA professional basketball team season

- Head coach: P. J. Carlesimo
- Arena: Rose Garden Arena

Results
- Record: 49–33 (.598)
- Place: Division: 3rd (Pacific); Conference: 5th (Western)
- Playoff finish: First round (lost to Lakers 1–3)
- Stats at Basketball Reference

Local media
- Television: KGW; Fox Sports Northwest
- Radio: KEX

The 1996–97 Portland Trail Blazers season was the 27th season for the Portland Trail Blazers in the National Basketball Association.

== Season summary ==
=== Off-season ===
The Trail Blazers had the 17th overall pick in the 1996 NBA draft, and selected power forward, and high school basketball star Jermaine O'Neal. During the off-season, the team signed free agent Kenny Anderson, acquired Isaiah Rider from the Minnesota Timberwolves, and acquired second-year forward Rasheed Wallace and Mitchell Butler from the Washington Bullets.

=== Regular season ===
With the addition of Anderson, Rider and Wallace, the Trail Blazers got off to a 12–8 start to the regular season, but then lost seven of their next nine games, falling below .500 in winning percentage with a 14–15 start to the season. However, the team posted a five-game winning streak afterwards, but later on posted a five-game losing streak between January and February, holding a 25–23 record at the All-Star break. At mid-season, the team traded Aaron McKie to the Detroit Pistons in exchange for Stacey Augmon in January. The Trail Blazers posted a 13–2 record in March, which included an 11-game winning streak between February and March, and then won their final four games of the season, finishing in third place in the Pacific Division with a 49–33 record, and earning the fifth seed in the Western Conference; the team qualified for the NBA playoffs for the 15th consecutive year, and also for the 20th time in 21 years.

Anderson averaged 17.5 points, 7.1 assists and 2.0 steals per game, and led the Trail Blazers with 132 three-point field goals, while Rider averaged 16.1 points per game, and Clifford Robinson contributed 15.1 points per game and 121 three-point field goals. In addition, Wallace provided the team with 15.1 points and 6.8 rebounds per game, but only played 62 games due to a broken thumb, while second-year center Arvydas Sabonis provided with 13.4 points and 7.9 rebounds per game. Off the bench, second-year forward Gary Trent averaged 10.8 points and 5.2 rebounds per game, while Augmon contributed 4.7 points per game in 40 games after the trade, Dontonio Wingfield provided with 4.5 points and 2.9 rebounds per game, and Chris Dudley averaged 3.9 points, 7.3 rebounds and 1.2 blocks per game.

Wallace finished in third place in Most Improved Player voting. The Trail Blazers finished third in the NBA in home-game attendance, with an attendance of 852,798 at the Rose Garden Arena during the regular season. The team had the seventh best team defensive rating in the NBA.

=== NBA playoffs ===
In the Western Conference First Round of the 1997 NBA playoffs, the Trail Blazers faced off against the 4th–seeded Los Angeles Lakers, who were led by the trio of All-Star center Shaquille O'Neal, All-Star guard Eddie Jones, and Nick Van Exel. The Trail Blazers lost the first two games to the Lakers on the road at the Great Western Forum, but managed to win Game 3 at home, 98–90 at the Rose Garden Arena. However, the Trail Blazers lost Game 4 to the Lakers at home, 95–91, thus losing the series in four games; it was the fifth consecutive year that the Trail Blazers lost in the opening round of the NBA playoffs.

=== Notable highlights ===
A forgotten highlight of the regular season occurred on April 16, 1997, in which the Trail Blazers defeated the Denver Nuggets at home by a 44-point margin, 107–63 at the Rose Garden Arena. The Trail Blazers held the Nuggets to only just eight points in the first quarter, and later on held a 53–22 lead at halftime; the Nuggets struggled only shooting just .284 in field-goal percentage.

=== Aftermath ===
Following the season, head coach P. J. Carlesimo was fired after three seasons with the Trail Blazers, while Robinson signed as a free agent with the Phoenix Suns after eight seasons in Portland. Meanwhile, Dudley was traded to the New York Knicks in a three-team trade, and Butler signed with the Cleveland Cavaliers.

== Draft picks ==
Round	Pick	Player	Position	Nationality	School/Club team
1	17	Jermaine O'Neal	PF/C	United States	Eau Claire HS (Columbia, SC)
2	46	Marcus Brown	PG	United States	Murray State

== Roster ==
1996–97 Portland Trail Blazers roster
Players

Pos.	No.	Player	Height	Weight	DOB	From
G	7	Kenny Anderson	6 ft 0 in (1.83 m)	168 lb (76 kg)	1970–10–09	Georgia Tech
G/F	2	Stacey Augmon	6 ft 8 in (2.03 m)	205 lb (93 kg)	1968–08–01	UNLV
G	4	Marcus Brown (injured)	6 ft 3 in (1.91 m)	185 lb (84 kg)	1974–04–03	Murray State
G	6	Mitchell Butler	6 ft 5 in (1.96 m)	210 lb (95 kg)	1970–12–15	UCLA
C	20	Chris Dudley	6 ft 11 in (2.11 m)	235 lb (107 kg)	1965–02–22	Yale
F/C	5	Jermaine O'Neal	6 ft 11 in (2.11 m)	226 lb (103 kg)	1978–10–13	Eau Claire HS (SC)
G	34	Isaiah Rider	6 ft 5 in (1.96 m)	215 lb (98 kg)	1971–03–12	UNLV
F	3	Clifford Robinson	6 ft 10 in (2.08 m)	225 lb (102 kg)	1966–12–16	Connecticut
G	21	Rumeal Robinson	6 ft 2 in (1.88 m)	195 lb (88 kg)	1966–11–13	Michigan
C	11	Arvydas Sabonis	7 ft 3 in (2.21 m)	279 lb (127 kg)	1964–12–19	Lithuania
F	33	Gary Trent	6 ft 8 in (2.03 m)	250 lb (113 kg)	1974–09–22	Ohio
F	30	Rasheed Wallace	6 ft 10 in (2.08 m)	225 lb (102 kg)	1974–09–17	North Carolina
G	8	Ennis Whatley	6 ft 3 in (1.91 m)	177 lb (80 kg)	1962–08–11	Alabama
F	10	Dontonio Wingfield	6 ft 8 in (2.03 m)	256 lb (116 kg)	1974–06–23	Cincinnati

Coaches
Head coach
- P. J. Carlesimo
Assistant(s)
- Rick Carlisle
- Dick Harter

Legend
- (DP) Unsigned draft pick
- (FA) Free agent
- (S) Suspended
- Injured

Roster

== Regular season ==
=== Season standings ===
Pacific Division	W	L	PCT	GB	Home	Road	Div
y-Seattle SuperSonics	57	25	.695	–	31–10	26–15	16–8
x-Los Angeles Lakers	56	26	.683	1	31–10	25–16	18–6
x-Portland Trail Blazers	49	33	.598	8	29–12	20–21	15–9
x-Phoenix Suns	40	42	.488	17	25–16	15–26	13–11
x-Los Angeles Clippers	36	46	.439	21	21–20	15–26	10–14
Sacramento Kings	34	48	.415	23	22–19	12–29	8–16
Golden State Warriors	30	52	.366	27	18–23	12–29	4–20

1996–97 NBA West standings
#	Western Conference				
#	Team	W	L	PCT	GB
1	c-Utah Jazz	64	18	.780	–
2	y-Seattle SuperSonics	57	25	.695	7
3	x-Houston Rockets	57	25	.695	7
4	x-Los Angeles Lakers	56	26	.683	8
5	x-Portland Trail Blazers	49	33	.598	15
6	x-Minnesota Timberwolves	40	42	.488	24
7	x-Phoenix Suns	40	42	.488	24
8	x-Los Angeles Clippers	36	46	.439	28
9	Sacramento Kings	34	48	.415	30
10	Golden State Warriors	30	52	.366	34
11	Dallas Mavericks	24	58	.293	40
12	Denver Nuggets	21	61	.256	43
13	San Antonio Spurs	20	62	.244	44
14	Vancouver Grizzlies	14	68	.171	50

z - clinched division title
y - clinched division title
x - clinched playoff spot

== Playoffs ==
1997 playoff game log
First round: 1–3 (home: 1–1; road: 0–2)

Game	Date	Team	Score	High points	High rebounds	High assists	Location Attendance	Series
1	April 25	@ L.A. Lakers	L 77–95	Wallace, Sabonis (18)	Chris Dudley (11)	Isaiah Rider (5)	Great Western Forum; 17,505	0–1
2	April 27	@ L.A. Lakers	L 93–107	Rasheed Wallace (20)	Clifford Robinson (10)	Kenny Anderson (7)	Great Western Forum; 17,505	0–2
3	April 30	L.A. Lakers	W 98–90	Kenny Anderson (30)	Chris Dudley (7)	Kenny Anderson (5)	Rose Garden; 21,538	1–2
4	May 2	L.A. Lakers	L 91–95	Arvydas Sabonis (23)	Arvydas Sabonis (10)	Kenny Anderson (5)	Rose Garden; 21,538	1–3

1997 schedule

== Player statistics ==
Legend
GP	Games played	GS	Games started	MPG	Minutes per game
FG%	Field-goal percentage	3P%	3-point field-goal percentage	FT%	Free-throw percentage
RPG	Rebounds per game	APG	Assists per game	SPG	Steals per game
BPG	Blocks per game	PPG	Points per game

=== Regular season ===
Player	GP	GS	MPG	FG%	3P%	FT%	RPG	APG	SPG	BPG	PPG
Kenny Anderson	82	81	37.6	.427	.361	.768	4.4	7.1	2.0	.2	17.5
Gary Trent	82	28	23.4	.536	.000	.699	5.2	1.1	.6	.4	10.8
Clifford Robinson	81	79	38.0	.426	.346	.696	4.0	3.2	1.2	.8	15.1
Chris Dudley	81	14	22.7	.430		.474	7.3	.5	.5	1.2	3.9
Isaiah Rider	76	68	33.7	.464	.385	.812	4.0	2.6	.6	.3	16.1
Arvydas Sabonis	69	68	25.5	.498	.371	.777	7.9	2.1	.9	1.2	13.4
Rasheed Wallace	62	56	30.5	.558	.273	.638	6.8	1.2	.8	1.0	15.1
Mitchell Butler	49	1	9.5	.416	.308	.640	1.1	.6	.3	.0	3.0
Dontonio Wingfield	47	0	12.1	.409	.338	.675	2.9	1.0	.3	.1	4.5
Jermaine O'Neal	45	0	10.2	.451	.000	.603	2.8	.2	.0	.6	4.1
Aaron McKie^{†}	41	8	18.9	.340	.418	.837	2.3	2.0	.8	.4	4.1
Stacey Augmon^{†}	40	7	16.3	.517		.732	2.2	1.0	.8	.2	4.7
Rumeal Robinson^{†}	27	0	10.9	.402	.391	.870	1.1	1.9	.7	.0	3.5
Marcus Brown	21	0	8.8	.400	.406	.684	.7	1.0	.4	.1	3.9
Randolph Childress^{†}	19	0	6.6	.333	.188	.750	.3	.8	.4	.0	1.5
Reggie Jordan^{†}	9	0	11.0	.500		.400	2.6	1.2	.6	.3	2.2
Aleksandar Đorđević	8	0	7.6	.500	.714	.800	.6	.6	.0	.0	3.1
Ennis Whatley	3	0	7.3	.500			1.0	1.0	.0	.0	1.3
Ruben Nembhard^{†}	2	0	9.5	.500	.000		.0	2.5	1.5	.0	4.0

=== Playoffs ===
Player	GP	GS	MPG	FG%	3P%	FT%	RPG	APG	SPG	BPG	PPG
Kenny Anderson	4	4	42.3	.478	.263	.950	4.3	4.8	1.8	.3	17.0
Isaiah Rider	4	4	40.3	.372	.375	.882	2.0	4.3	.8	.0	13.3
Clifford Robinson	4	4	40.3	.362	.188	.688	6.8	3.0	.5	1.0	12.0
Rasheed Wallace	4	4	37.0	.589	.400	.550	6.0	1.5	.5	.5	19.8
Arvydas Sabonis	4	4	27.0	.429	.250	.875	6.5	2.3	.8	.8	11.3
Chris Dudley	4	0	17.3	.455		.333	7.0	.8	.5	1.3	3.0
Gary Trent	4	0	15.3	.448	.000	.545	3.0	1.0	.0	.3	8.0
Stacey Augmon	4	0	8.8	.333		.750	.3	.8	.3	.0	1.8
Rumeal Robinson	4	0	6.0	.333	.000	1.000	.3	1.3	.3	.0	1.3
Dontonio Wingfield	3	0	5.3	1.000		1.000	.7	.3	.3	.0	2.7
Mitchell Butler	2	0	2.0	.500			.5	.0	.0	.0	1.0
Jermaine O'Neal	2	0	2.0	.000	.000	.000	.5	.0	.0	.5	.0

- ^{†} Denotes player spent time with another team in the season. Stats reflect time with the Trail Blazers only.

Player statistics citation:

== Transactions ==
=== Trades ===
July 15, 1996	To Portland Trail Blazers Mitchell Butler; Rasheed Wallace	To Washington Bullets Harvey Grant; Rod Strickland

July 23, 1996	To Portland Trail Blazers Isaiah Rider	To Minnesota Timberwolves Bill Curley; James Robinson; 1997 1st-round pick

January 24, 1997	To Portland Trail Blazers Stacey Augmon	To Detroit Pistons Randolph Childress; Reggie Jordan; Aaron McKie

=== Free agents ===
Additions
Player	Date signed	Former team
Kenny Anderson	July 23	Charlotte Hornets
Reggie Jordan	August 30	Atlanta Hawks
Aleksandar Đorđević	September 20	Fortitudo Bologna (Italy)
Ennis Whatley (10-day)	January 24	Presto Tivolis (Philippines)
Ruben Nembhard (10-day)	January 30	none
Rumeal Robinson (10-day)	February 24	Connecticut Pride (CBA)

Subtractions
Player	Date signed	New Team
Buck Williams	July 23	New York Knicks
Rumeal Robinson	July 23	signed with team later in season
Elmore Spencer	July 23	Seattle SuperSonics
Jason Sasser	October 16	Sioux Falls Skyforce (CBA)
Aleksandar Đorđević	December 27	FC Barcelona (Spain)

Player transactions citation:
