= 1996–97 Seattle SuperSonics season =

NBA professional basketball team season

- Division champions
- Head coach: George Karl
- General manager: Wally Walker
- Arena: KeyArena at Seattle Center

Results
- Record: 57–25 (.695)
- Place: Division: 1st (Pacific); Conference: 2nd (Western)
- Playoff finish: West Semi-finals (lost to Rockets 3–4)
- Stats at Basketball Reference

Local media
- Television: KSTW; Fox Sports Northwest
- Radio: KJR

The 1996–97 Seattle SuperSonics season was the 29th season for the Seattle SuperSonics in the National Basketball Association. The SuperSonics entered the regular season as runners-up in the 1996 NBA Finals, having lost to the Chicago Bulls in six games.

== Season summary ==
=== Off-season ===
During the off-season, the SuperSonics signed free agent center Jim McIlvaine to a 7-year $33.6 million contract, which was controversial as McIlvaine previously played a reserve role for the Washington Bullets in his first two seasons of his NBA career; he only averaged 2.3 points, 2.9 rebounds and 2.1 blocks per game during the previous season. The team also signed other free agents, Craig Ehlo, and Larry Stewart, and then later on signed former All-Star forward Terry Cummings in January.

=== Regular season ===
With the addition of McIlvaine, the SuperSonics posted an 11-game winning streak after losing two of their first three games of the regular season. The team posted a nine-game winning streak in January, and later on held a 32–15 record at the All-Star break. The SuperSonics posted a seven-game winning streak in February, and won their third Division title in four years, finishing in first place in the Pacific Division with a 57–25 record, and earning the second seed in the Western Conference; the team qualified for the NBA playoffs for the seventh consecutive year. The SuperSonics had the sixth best team defensive rating in the NBA.

Gary Payton averaged 21.8 points, 7.1 assists and 2.4 steals per game, contributed 119 three-point field goals, and was named to the All-NBA Second Team, and to the NBA All-Defensive First Team, while Shawn Kemp averaged 18.7 points, 10.0 rebounds and 1.5 steals per game, and Detlef Schrempf provided the team with 16.8 points, 6.5 rebounds and 4.4 assists per game, but only played 61 games due to a foot injury. In addition, Hersey Hawkins contributed 13.9 points and 1.9 steals per game, and led the SuperSonics with 143 three-point field goals, while off the bench, sixth man Sam Perkins provided with 11.0 points per game and 122 three-point field goals, Cummings averaged 8.2 points and 4.1 rebounds per game in 45 games, Stewart provided with 4.3 points per game, and McIlvaine, who was the team's starting center, contributed 3.8 points, 4.0 rebounds and 2.0 blocks per game. Defensive guard Nate McMillan only played just 37 games this season due to a torn right abductor muscle, as he averaged 4.6 points, 3.8 assists and 1.6 steals per game.

During the NBA All-Star weekend at the Gund Arena in Cleveland, Ohio, Payton, Kemp and Schrempf were all selected for the 1997 NBA All-Star Game, as members of the Western Conference All-Star team; it was Schrempf's third and final All-Star appearance. Payton posted a double-double of 17 points and 10 assists, despite the Western Conference losing to the Eastern Conference, 132–120. Meanwhile, Perkins participated in the NBA Three-Point Shootout. Payton finished in sixth place in Most Valuable Player voting, and also finished in second place in Defensive Player of the Year voting, behind Dikembe Mutombo of the Atlanta Hawks, while Kemp finished tied in sixth place, and Perkins finished tied in fifth place in Sixth Man of the Year voting.

The SuperSonics finished 13th in the NBA in home-game attendance, with an attendance of 699,952 at the KeyArena at Seattle Center during the regular season.

=== NBA playoffs ===
In the Western Conference First Round of the 1997 NBA playoffs, the SuperSonics faced off against the 7th–seeded Phoenix Suns, a team that featured Kevin Johnson, Rex Chapman, and All-Star guard Jason Kidd. The SuperSonics lost Game 1 to the Suns at home, 106–101 at the KeyArena at Seattle Center, but then won Game 2 at home by a 44-point margin, 122–78. The SuperSonics faced elimination after losing Game 3 to the Suns on the road, 110–103 at the America West Arena, as the Suns took a 2–1 series lead. However, the SuperSonics managed to win Game 4 on the road in overtime, 122–115 to even the series, and then won Game 5 over the Suns at the KeyArena at Seattle Center, 116–92 to win in a hard-fought five-game series.

In the Western Conference Semi-finals, the team faced off against the 3rd–seeded Houston Rockets, who were led by the All-Star trio of Hakeem Olajuwon, Charles Barkley and Clyde Drexler. Despite both teams finishing with the same regular-season record, and with the SuperSonics winning the Pacific Division title, the Rockets had home-court advantage in the series. The Rockets took a 3–1 series lead over the SuperSonics, defeating them in Game 4 at the KeyArena at Seattle Center in overtime, 110–106. The SuperSonics managed to win the next two games, including a Game 6 home win over the Rockets, 99–96 to even the series at 3–3. However, the SuperSonics lost Game 7 to the Rockets on the road, 96–91 at The Summit, thus losing in a hard-fought seven-game series.

=== Aftermath ===
Following the season, Kemp was traded to the Cleveland Cavaliers in an off-season three-team trade after eight seasons with the SuperSonics. Meanwhile, Cummings signed as a free agent with the Philadelphia 76ers, Stewart was released to free agency, and Ehlo retired.

== Draft picks ==
Round	Pick	Player	Position	Nationality	College
2	35	Joseph Blair	C	United States	Arizona
2	45	Joe Vogel	C	United States	Colorado State
2	47	Ron Riley	SG/SF	United States	Arizona State
2	57	Drew Barry	PG	United States	Georgia Tech

== Roster ==
1996–97 Seattle SuperSonics roster
Players

Pos.	No.	Player	Height	Weight	DOB	From
F	34	Terry Cummings	6 ft 9 in (2.06 m)	220 lb (100 kg)	1961–03–15	DePaul
G	3	Craig Ehlo	6 ft 6 in (1.98 m)	180 lb (82 kg)	1961–08–11	Washington State
G	21	Greg Graham	6 ft 4 in (1.93 m)	174 lb (79 kg)	1970–11–26	Indiana
C	24	Antonio Harvey	6 ft 11 in (2.11 m)	250 lb (113 kg)	1970–07–06	Pfeiffer
G	33	Hersey Hawkins	6 ft 3 in (1.91 m)	190 lb (86 kg)	1966–09–29	Bradley
F	40	Shawn Kemp	6 ft 10 in (2.08 m)	230 lb (104 kg)	1969–11–26	Trinity Valley CC
C	22	Jim McIlvaine	7 ft 1 in (2.16 m)	240 lb (109 kg)	1972–07–30	Marquette
G	10	Nate McMillan	6 ft 5 in (1.96 m)	195 lb (88 kg)	1964–08–03	NC State
G	20	Gary Payton	6 ft 4 in (1.93 m)	180 lb (82 kg)	1968–07–23	Oregon State
C	14	Sam Perkins	6 ft 9 in (2.06 m)	235 lb (107 kg)	1961–06–14	North Carolina
C	55	Steve Scheffler	6 ft 9 in (2.06 m)	250 lb (113 kg)	1967–09–03	Purdue
F	11	Detlef Schrempf	6 ft 10 in (2.08 m)	214 lb (97 kg)	1963–01–21	Washington
G	13	Eric Snow	6 ft 3 in (1.91 m)	190 lb (86 kg)	1973–04–24	Michigan State
F	23	Larry Stewart	6 ft 8 in (2.03 m)	220 lb (100 kg)	1968–09–21	Coppin State
G	25	David Wingate	6 ft 5 in (1.96 m)	185 lb (84 kg)	1963–12–15	Georgetown

Coaches
Head coach
- George Karl
Assistant(s)
- Dwane Casey
- Tim Grgurich
- Terry Stotts
- Bob Weiss

Legend
- (DP) Unsigned draft pick
- (FA) Free agent
- (S) Suspended
- Injured

== Regular season ==
=== Season standings ===
Pacific Division	W	L	PCT	GB	Home	Road	Div
y-Seattle SuperSonics	57	25	.695	–	31–10	26–15	16–8
x-Los Angeles Lakers	56	26	.683	1	31–10	25–16	18–6
x-Portland Trail Blazers	49	33	.598	8	29–12	20–21	15–9
x-Phoenix Suns	40	42	.488	17	25–16	15–26	13–11
x-Los Angeles Clippers	36	46	.439	21	21–20	15–26	10–14
Sacramento Kings	34	48	.415	23	22–19	12–29	8–16
Golden State Warriors	30	52	.366	27	18–23	12–29	4–20

1996–97 NBA West standings
#	Western Conference				
#	Team	W	L	PCT	GB
1	c-Utah Jazz	64	18	.780	–
2	y-Seattle SuperSonics	57	25	.695	7
3	x-Houston Rockets	57	25	.695	7
4	x-Los Angeles Lakers	56	26	.683	8
5	x-Portland Trail Blazers	49	33	.598	15
6	x-Minnesota Timberwolves	40	42	.488	24
7	x-Phoenix Suns	40	42	.488	24
8	x-Los Angeles Clippers	36	46	.439	28
9	Sacramento Kings	34	48	.415	30
10	Golden State Warriors	30	52	.366	34
11	Dallas Mavericks	24	58	.293	40
12	Denver Nuggets	21	61	.256	43
13	San Antonio Spurs	20	62	.244	44
14	Vancouver Grizzlies	14	68	.171	50

== Playoffs ==
1997 playoff game log
First round: 3–2 (home: 2–1; road: 1–1)

Game	Date	Team	Score	High points	High rebounds	High assists	Location Attendance	Series
1	April 25	Phoenix	L 101–106	Gary Payton (23)	Shawn Kemp (15)	Gary Payton (9)	KeyArena; 17,072	0–1
2	April 27	Phoenix	W 122–78	Payton, Kemp (23)	Shawn Kemp (15)	Gary Payton (6)	KeyArena; 17,072	1–1
3	April 29	@ Phoenix	L 103–110	Gary Payton (34)	Shawn Kemp (11)	Gary Payton (6)	America West Arena; 19,023	1–2
4	May 1	@ Phoenix	W 122–115 (OT)	Gary Payton (28)	Shawn Kemp (20)	Gary Payton (14)	America West Arena; 19,023	2–2
5	May 3	Phoenix	W 116–92	Detlef Schrempf (24)	Shawn Kemp (11)	Gary Payton (10)	KeyArena; 17,072	3–2

Conference Semi-finals: 3–4 (home: 1–2; road: 2–2)

Game	Date	Team	Score	High points	High rebounds	High assists	Location Attendance	Series
1	May 5	@ Houston	L 102–112	Shawn Kemp (24)	Shawn Kemp (11)	Eric Snow (7)	The Summit; 16,285	0–1
2	May 7	@ Houston	W 106–101	Shawn Kemp (22)	Shawn Kemp (15)	Gary Payton (9)	The Summit; 16,285	1–1
3	May 9	Houston	L 93–97	Payton, Kemp (28)	Shawn Kemp (10)	Payton, Kemp (5)	KeyArena; 17,072	1–2
4	May 11	Houston	L 106–110 (OT)	Gary Payton (27)	Kemp, Cummings (9)	Gary Payton (11)	KeyArena; 17,072	1–3
5	May 13	@ Houston	W 100–94	Hersey Hawkins (23)	Shawn Kemp (10)	Gary Payton (11)	The Summit; 16,285	2–3
6	May 15	Houston	W 99–96	Shawn Kemp (22)	Shawn Kemp (11)	Gary Payton (13)	KeyArena; 17,072	3–3
7	May 17	@ Houston	L 91–96	Gary Payton (27)	Shawn Kemp (10)	Gary Payton (7)	The Summit; 16,285	3–4

1997 schedule

== Player statistics ==
Legend
GP	Games played	GS	Games started	MPG	Minutes per game
FG%	Field-goal percentage	3P%	3-point field-goal percentage	FT%	Free-throw percentage
RPG	Rebounds per game	APG	Assists per game	SPG	Steals per game
BPG	Blocks per game	PPG	Points per game

=== Season ===
Player	GP	GS	MPG	FG%	3P%	FT%	RPG	APG	SPG	BPG	PPG
Gary Payton	82	82	39.2	.476	.313	.715	4.6	7.1	2.4	.2	21.8
Hersey Hawkins	82	82	33.6	.464	.403	.875	3.9	3.0	1.9	.1	13.9
Jim McIlvaine	82	79	18.0	.471	.143	.495	4.0	.3	.5	2.0	3.8
Shawn Kemp	81	75	34.0	.510	.364	.742	10.0	1.9	1.5	1.0	18.7
Sam Perkins	81	4	24.4	.439	.395	.817	3.7	1.3	.9	.6	11.0
Larry Stewart	70	21	14.0	.444	.243	.720	2.4	.7	.4	.3	4.3
Eric Snow	67	0	11.6	.451	.267	.712	1.0	2.4	.6	.0	3.0
David Wingate	65	2	14.3	.416	.352	.825	1.1	1.2	.7	.1	3.6
Craig Ehlo	62	0	13.7	.351	.284	.500	1.8	1.1	.6	.1	3.5
Detlef Schrempf	61	60	35.9	.492	.354	.801	6.5	4.4	1.0	.3	16.8
Terry Cummings	45	3	18.4	.486	.600	.695	4.1	.9	.7	.2	8.2
Nate McMillan	37	2	21.6	.409	.333	.655	3.2	3.8	1.6	.2	4.6
Greg Graham	28	0	7.0	.363	.290	.650	.5	.4	.4	.0	3.3
Steve Scheffler	7	0	4.1	.857		.500	.4	.0	.0	.0	1.9
Antonio Harvey	6	0	4.3	.455		.833	1.7	.2	.0	.7	2.5
Elmore Spencer	1	0	5.0	.000			.0	.0	1.0	.0	.0

=== Playoffs ===
Player	GP	GS	MPG	FG%	3P%	FT%	RPG	APG	SPG	BPG	PPG
Gary Payton	12	12	45.5	.412	.333	.820	5.4	8.7	2.2	.3	23.8
Hersey Hawkins	12	12	40.3	.470	.458	.914	4.5	2.8	2.5	.3	15.3
Detlef Schrempf	12	12	38.3	.472	.552	.815	5.8	3.4	1.1	.1	16.9
Shawn Kemp	12	12	36.8	.486	.200	.829	12.3	3.0	1.2	1.3	21.6
Sam Perkins	12	6	28.3	.337	.311	.862	4.4	1.3	1.0	1.0	8.4
Terry Cummings	12	6	24.3	.489		.667	6.0	1.2	.9	.5	8.8
David Wingate	12	0	16.0	.424	.387	.692	3.1	1.2	.4	.3	6.4
Eric Snow	8	0	6.0	.455	.500	.500	.3	1.5	.5	.0	1.6
Greg Graham	6	0	7.2	.286	.250	.750	.8	1.0	.3	.0	2.0
Jim McIlvaine	5	0	5.6	.571		.500	.4	.0	.2	.4	1.8
Larry Stewart	4	0	4.0	.833	.500	1.000	.3	.5	.5	.3	3.3
Nate McMillan	3	0	13.7	.000	.000		1.7	1.0	.3	.0	.0

Player statistics citation:

== Awards and records ==
=== Awards ===
- Gary Payton, All-NBA Second Team
- Gary Payton, NBA All-Defensive First Team

== Transactions ==
=== Free agents ===
==== Additions ====
Player	Signed	Former team

==== Subtractions ====
Player	Left	New team

== See also ==
- 1996–97 NBA season
