= 1996–97 Houston Rockets season =

- Head coach: Rudy Tomjanovich
- General manager: Carroll Dawson
- Owner: Leslie Alexander
- Arena: The Summit

Results
- Record: 57–25 (.695)
- Place: Division: 2nd (Midwest); Conference: 3rd (Western)
- Playoff finish: Western Conference finals (lost to Jazz 2–4)
- Stats at Basketball Reference

Local media
- Television: KTXH; Fox Sports Southwest
- Radio: KTRH

The 1996–97 Houston Rockets season was the 30th season for the Houston Rockets in the National Basketball Association, and their 26th season in Houston, Texas.

== Season summary ==
=== Off-season ===
During the off-season, the Rockets acquired All-Star forward Charles Barkley from the Phoenix Suns, and signed free agents Kevin Willis, Brent Price, undrafted rookie point guard Matt Maloney, and re-signed former Rockets forward and three-point specialist Matt Bullard, who was a member of the championship team from the 1994 NBA Finals.

=== Regular season ===
With the addition of Barkley, Willis and Maloney, the Rockets won their first six games of the regular season. The team posted a nine-game winning streak between November and December, and posted another six-game winning streak in December, leading to a 21–2 start to the season. However, the Rockets later on struggled posting a six-game losing streak between January and February, and held a 32–16 record at the All-Star break. At mid-season, the team signed free agents Eddie Johnson and Sedale Threatt. The Rockets posted another six-game winning streak in March, won 14 of their final 17 games of the season, and finished in second place in the Midwest Division with a 57–25 record, earning the third seed in the Western Conference; the team qualified for the NBA playoffs for the fifth consecutive year.

Hakeem Olajuwon averaged 23.2 points, 9.2 rebounds, 1.5 steals and 2.2 blocks per game, and was named to the All-NBA First Team, and to the NBA All-Defensive Second Team, while Barkley averaged 19.2 points, 13.5 rebounds, 4.7 assists and 1.3 steals per game, but only played 53 games due to ankle and hip injuries, and Clyde Drexler provided the team with 18.0 points, 6.0 rebounds, 5.7 assists and 1.9 steals per game, along with 119 three-point field goals, but only played 62 games due to a hamstring injury. In addition, Mario Elie provided with 11.7 points and 4.0 assists per game, along with 120 three-point field goals, while Johnson contributed 11.5 points per game in 24 games, Willis averaged 11.2 points and 7.5 rebounds per game, and Maloney contributed 9.4 points and 3.7 assists per game, led the Rockets with 154 three-point field goals, and was named to the NBA All-Rookie Second Team. Meanwhile, Sam Mack contributed 5.6 points per game in 52 games, Price provided with 5.0 and 2.6 assists per game in 25 games, rookie power forward, and second-round draft pick Othella Harrington averaged 4.8 points and 3.5 rebounds per game, Bullard contributed 4.5 points per game, and rookie point guard, and second-round draft pick Randy Livingston provided with 3.9 points and 2.4 assists per game.

During the NBA All-Star weekend at the Gund Arena in Cleveland, Ohio, Olajuwon, Barkley and Drexler were all selected for the 1997 NBA All-Star Game, as members of the Western Conference All-Star team, while head coach Rudy Tomjanovich was selected to coach the Western Conference. However, Barkley and Drexler did not participate due to injuries; it was also the final All-Star selections for Olajuwon, Barkley and Drexler. Meanwhile, Maloney was selected for the NBA Rookie Game, as a member of the Western Conference Rookie team. Olajuwon also finished in seventh place in Most Valuable Player voting, while Barkley finished in 16th place, and Elie finished tied in sixth place in Defensive Player of the Year voting.

The Rockets finished 19th in the NBA in home-game attendance, with an attendance of 667,685 at The Summit during the regular season.

=== NBA playoffs ===
In the Western Conference First Round of the 1997 NBA playoffs, the Rockets faced off against the 6th–seeded Minnesota Timberwolves, a team that featured the trio of All-Star forward Tom Gugliotta, All-Star forward Kevin Garnett, and rookie point guard Stephon Marbury. The Rockets won the first two games over the Timberwolves at home at The Summit, before winning Game 3 on the road, 125–120 at the Target Center to win the series in a three-game sweep.

In the Western Conference Semi-finals, the team faced off against the 2nd–seeded, and Pacific Division champion Seattle SuperSonics, who were led by the All-Star trio of Gary Payton, Shawn Kemp and Detlef Schrempf. Both teams finished with the same regular-season record, but despite the SuperSonics winning the Pacific Division title, the Rockets had home-court advantage in the series. The Rockets took a 3–1 series lead over the SuperSonics, which included a Game 4 road win in overtime, 110–106 at the KeyArena at Seattle Center. However, the Rockets lost the next two games to the SuperSonics, including a Game 6 road loss, 99–96. With the series tied at 3–3, the Rockets won Game 7 over the SuperSonics at The Summit, 96–91 to win in a hard-fought seven-game series, and advance to the Conference Finals.

In the Western Conference Finals, the Rockets then faced off against the top–seeded, and Midwest Division champion Utah Jazz, who were led by the trio of All-Star forward, and Most Valuable Player of the Year, Karl Malone, All-Star guard John Stockton, and Jeff Hornacek. The Rockets lost the first two games to the Jazz on the road at the Delta Center, but managed to win their next two home games to even the series at 2–2, as Johnson hit a three-point buzzer-beater to win Game 4 over the Jazz, 95–92 at The Summit. However, after losing Game 5 at the Delta Center, 96–91, the Rockets lost Game 6 to the Jazz at The Summit, 103–100, when Stockton hit the series-winning three-point shot over Barkley at the buzzer, thus losing the series in six games.

The Jazz would advance to the NBA Finals for the first time in franchise history, but would lose to the defending NBA champion Chicago Bulls in six games in the 1997 NBA Finals.

=== Aftermath ===
Following the season, Mack was traded to the Vancouver Grizzlies, and Threatt and Livingston were both released to free agency. The Rockets would not advance to the Western Conference Finals again until 2015, where they were defeated by the Golden State Warriors in five games.

== Offseason ==
During the 1996 off-season, All-Star forward Charles Barkley was traded from the Phoenix Suns in exchange for Sam Cassell, Robert Horry, Mark Bryant, and Chucky Brown; Barkley chose Houston specifically because he hoped to win an NBA championship with the team.

== Draft picks ==
| Round | Pick | Player | Position | Nationality | College |
|---|---|---|---|---|---|
| 2 | 30 | Othella Harrington | PF/C | United States | Georgetown |
| 2 | 42 | Randy Livingston | SG/PG | United States | LSU |
| 2 | 50 | Terrell Bell | C | United States | Georgia |

== Roster ==
1996–97 Houston Rockets roster
Players

| Pos. | No. | Player | Height | Weight | DOB | From |
|---|---|---|---|---|---|---|
| F | 4 | Charles Barkley | 6 ft 6 in (1.98 m) | 252 lb (114 kg) | 1963–02–20 | Auburn |
| F | 50 | Matt Bullard | 6 ft 10 in (2.08 m) | 215 lb (98 kg) | 1967–06–05 | Iowa |
| G | 15 | Emanual Davis | 6 ft 4 in (1.93 m) | 195 lb (88 kg) | 1968–08–27 | Delaware State |
| G | 22 | Clyde Drexler | 6 ft 7 in (2.01 m) | 210 lb (95 kg) | 1962–06–22 | Houston |
| G/F | 17 | Mario Elie | 6 ft 5 in (1.96 m) | 210 lb (95 kg) | 1963–11–26 | American International |
| F | 32 | Othella Harrington | 6 ft 9 in (2.06 m) | 235 lb (107 kg) | 1974–01–31 | Georgetown |
| G/F | 8 | Eddie Johnson | 6 ft 7 in (2.01 m) | 215 lb (98 kg) | 1959–05–01 | Illinois |
| F/C | 27 | Charles Jones | 6 ft 9 in (2.06 m) | 215 lb (98 kg) | 1957–04–03 | Albany State |
| G | 3 | Randy Livingston | 6 ft 4 in (1.93 m) | 209 lb (95 kg) | 1975–04–02 | LSU |
| F | 5 | Sam Mack | 6 ft 7 in (2.01 m) | 220 lb (100 kg) | 1970–05–26 | Houston |
| G | 12 | Matt Maloney | 6 ft 3 in (1.91 m) | 192 lb (87 kg) | 1971–12–06 | Penn |
| C | 34 | Hakeem Olajuwon | 7 ft 0 in (2.13 m) | 255 lb (116 kg) | 1963–01–21 | Houston |
| G | 20 | Brent Price | 6 ft 1 in (1.85 m) | 165 lb (75 kg) | 1968–12–09 | Oklahoma |
| G | 2 | Sedale Threatt | 6 ft 2 in (1.88 m) | 175 lb (79 kg) | 1961–09–10 | West Virginia Tech |
| F/C | 42 | Kevin Willis | 7 ft 0 in (2.13 m) | 220 lb (100 kg) | 1962–09–06 | Michigan State |

Coaches
Head coach
- Rudy Tomjanovich
Assistant(s)
- Bill Berry
- Jim Boylen
- Carroll Dawson
- Larry Smith

Legend
- (DP) Unsigned draft pick
- (FA) Free agent
- (S) Suspended
- Injured

Roster

== Regular season ==
In his first game with the Houston Rockets, Charles Barkley got 33 rebounds, a career high.

=== Season standings ===
| Midwest Division | W | L | PCT | GB | Home | Road | Div |
|---|---|---|---|---|---|---|---|
| y-Utah Jazz | 64 | 18 | .780 | – | 38–3 | 26–15 | 19–5 |
| x-Houston Rockets | 57 | 25 | .695 | 7 | 30–11 | 27–14 | 19–5 |
| x-Minnesota Timberwolves | 40 | 42 | .488 | 24 | 25–16 | 15–26 | 16–8 |
| Dallas Mavericks | 24 | 58 | .293 | 40 | 14–27 | 10–31 | 9–15 |
| Denver Nuggets | 21 | 61 | .256 | 43 | 12–29 | 9–32 | 7–17 |
| San Antonio Spurs | 20 | 62 | .244 | 44 | 12–29 | 8–33 | 8–16 |
| Vancouver Grizzlies | 14 | 68 | .171 | 50 | 8–33 | 6–35 | 6–18 |

1996–97 NBA West standings
| # | Western Conference | | | | |
| # | Team | W | L | PCT | GB |
|---|---|---|---|---|---|
| 1 | c-Utah Jazz | 64 | 18 | .780 | – |
| 2 | y-Seattle SuperSonics | 57 | 25 | .695 | 7 |
| 3 | x-Houston Rockets | 57 | 25 | .695 | 7 |
| 4 | x-Los Angeles Lakers | 56 | 26 | .683 | 8 |
| 5 | x-Portland Trail Blazers | 49 | 33 | .598 | 15 |
| 6 | x-Minnesota Timberwolves | 40 | 42 | .488 | 24 |
| 7 | x-Phoenix Suns | 40 | 42 | .488 | 24 |
| 8 | x-Los Angeles Clippers | 36 | 46 | .439 | 28 |
| 9 | Sacramento Kings | 34 | 48 | .415 | 30 |
| 10 | Golden State Warriors | 30 | 52 | .366 | 34 |
| 11 | Dallas Mavericks | 24 | 58 | .293 | 40 |
| 12 | Denver Nuggets | 21 | 61 | .256 | 43 |
| 13 | San Antonio Spurs | 20 | 62 | .244 | 44 |
| 14 | Vancouver Grizzlies | 14 | 68 | .171 | 50 |

c – clinched conference title
y – clinched division title
x – clinched playoff spot

=== Game log ===
| Game | Date | Opponent | Result | Team points | Opponent score | Record | Streak | OT |
| 1 | November 1 | vs Sacramento | Win | 96 | 85 | 1-0 | Won 1 | |
| 2 | November 2 | at Phoenix | Win | 110 | 95 | 2-0 | Won 2 | |
| 3 | November 4 | at Utah | Win | 75 | 72 | 3-0 | Won 3 | |
| 4 | November 5 | at Sacramento | Win | 102 | 80 | 4-0 | Won 4 | |
| 5 | November 7 | at Denver | Win | 110 | 108 | 5-0 | Won 5 | OT |
| 6 | November 9 | vs Utah | Win | 91 | 85 | 6-0 | Won 6 | |
| 7 | November 12 | vs LA Lakers | Loss | 115 | 126 | 6-1 | Lost 1 | 2OT |
| 8 | November 14 | vs Indiana | Win | 90 | 88 | 7-1 | Won 1 | |
| 9 | November 16 | vs Golden State | Win | 115 | 103 | 8-1 | Won 2 | |
| 10 | November 19 | vs Minnesota | Win | 122 | 93 | 9-1 | Won 3 | |
| 11 | November 21 | vs Phoenix | Win | 115 | 105 | 10-1 | Won 4 | |
| 12 | November 23 | at Golden State | Win | 120 | 115 | 11-1 | Won 5 | OT |
| 13 | November 24 | at LA Lakers | Win | 90 | 85 | 12-1 | Won 6 | |
| 14 | November 26 | vs Portland | Win | 102 | 101 | 13-1 | Won 7 | OT |
| 15 | November 29 | at Boston | Win | 120 | 94 | 14-1 | Won 8 | |
| 16 | November 30 | at Washington | Win | 103 | 99 | 15-1 | Won 9 | |
| 17 | December 2 | at Toronto | Loss | 89 | 100 | 15-2 | Lost 1 | |
| 18 | December 4 | vs Boston | Win | 94 | 89 | 16-2 | Won 1 | |
| 19 | December 7 | vs Philadelphia | Win | 123 | 108 | 17-2 | Won 2 | |
| 20 | December 10 | at Minnesota | Win | 96 | 94 | 18-2 | Won 3 | |
| 21 | December 12 | vs Detroit | Win | 115 | 96 | 19-2 | Won 4 | |
| 22 | December 14 | at Seattle | Win | 109 | 100 | 20-2 | Won 5 | |
| 23 | December 15 | at Portland | Win | 99 | 89 | 21-2 | Won 6 | |
| 24 | December 17 | at Vancouver | Loss | 92 | 93 | 21-3 | Lost 1 | |
| 25 | December 19 | vs San Antonio | Loss | 101 | 115 | 21-4 | Lost 2 | |
| 26 | December 21 | vs Miami | Loss | 66 | 86 | 21-5 | Lost 3 | |
| 27 | December 23 | vs Milwaukee | Loss | 76 | 81 | 21-6 | Lost 4 | |
| 28 | December 26 | at Milwaukee | Win | 101 | 90 | 22-6 | Won 1 | |
| 29 | December 28 | vs Golden State | Win | 104 | 95 | 23-6 | Won 2 | |
| 30 | December 30 | vs Seattle | Win | 99 | 91 | 24-6 | Won 3 | |
| 31 | January 2 | vs Portland | Loss | 96 | 112 | 24-7 | Lost 1 | |
| 32 | January 4 | vs LA Clippers | Loss | 91 | 95 | 24-8 | Lost 2 | |
| 33 | January 7 | at Minnesota | Win | 104 | 95 | 25-8 | Won 1 | |
| 34 | January 8 | at Cleveland | Win | 81 | 78 | 26-8 | Won 2 | |
| 35 | January 10 | at Philadelphia | Win | 120 | 99 | 27-8 | Won 3 | |
| 36 | January 11 | at Chicago | Loss | 86 | 110 | 27-9 | Lost 1 | |
| 37 | January 14 | vs New York | Win | 106 | 86 | 28-9 | Won 1 | |
| 38 | January 16 | vs Sacramento | Win | 89 | 80 | 29-9 | Won 2 | |
| 39 | January 17 | at Dallas | Win | 88 | 78 | 30-9 | Won 3 | |
| 40 | January 19 | vs Chicago | Win | 102 | 86 | 31-9 | Won 4 | |
| 41 | January 21 | at Charlotte | Loss | 108 | 114 | 31-10 | Lost 1 | |
| 42 | January 23 | vs New Jersey | Win | 111 | 104 | 32-10 | Won 1 | |
| 43 | January 25 | vs Utah | Loss | 100 | 105 | 32-11 | Lost 1 | OT |
| 44 | January 30 | vs Denver | Loss | 109 | 113 | 32-12 | Lost 2 | |
| 45 | January 31 | at Indiana | Loss | 74 | 100 | 32-13 | Lost 3 | |
| 46 | February 2 | at Orlando | Loss | 90 | 103 | 32-14 | Lost 4 | |
| 47 | February 4 | at New York | Loss | 95 | 99 | 32-15 | Lost 5 | |
| 48 | February 6 | at Detroit | Loss | 87 | 96 | 32-16 | Lost 6 | |
| 49 | February 11 | vs Vancouver | Win | 106 | 97 | 33-16 | Won 1 | |
| 50 | February 14 | at Seattle | Loss | 85 | 105 | 33-17 | Lost 1 | |
| 51 | February 15 | at Portland | Loss | 105 | 109 | 33-18 | Lost 2 | |
| 52 | February 17 | vs Atlanta | Win | 127 | 98 | 34-18 | Won 1 | |
| 53 | February 20 | vs Toronto | Win | 107 | 97 | 35-18 | Won 2 | |
| 54 | February 21 | at Atlanta | Loss | 74 | 76 | 35-19 | Lost 1 | |
| 55 | February 23 | vs San Antonio | Win | 95 | 85 | 36-19 | Won 1 | |
| 56 | February 25 | vs LA Lakers | Win | 100 | 96 | 37-19 | Won 2 | |
| 57 | February 27 | vs Charlotte | Loss | 95 | 106 | 37-20 | Lost 1 | |
| 58 | March 1 | vs Dallas | Win | 89 | 80 | 38-20 | Won 1 | |
| 59 | March 4 | at LA Clippers | Win | 113 | 109 | 39-20 | Won 2 | |
| 60 | March 5 | at Golden State | Win | 90 | 85 | 40-20 | Won 3 | |
| 61 | March 7 | at LA Lakers | Win | 111 | 90 | 41-20 | Won 4 | |
| 62 | March 9 | at Dallas | Win | 88 | 83 | 42-20 | Won 5 | |
| 63 | March 11 | at San Antonio | Win | 103 | 79 | 43-20 | Won 6 | |
| 64 | March 12 | vs Orlando | Loss | 95 | 96 | 43-21 | Lost 1 | |
| 65 | March 16 | at Miami | Loss | 80 | 101 | 43-22 | Lost 2 | |
| 66 | March 18 | at New Jersey | Win | 97 | 89 | 44-22 | Won 1 | |
| 67 | March 20 | vs Washington | Win | 96 | 90 | 45-22 | Won 2 | |
| 68 | March 22 | vs Phoenix | Loss | 99 | 104 | 45-23 | Lost 1 | |
| 69 | March 25 | vs Minnesota | Win | 112 | 103 | 46-23 | Won 1 | |
| 70 | March 27 | vs Cleveland | Win | 107 | 89 | 47-23 | Won 2 | |
| 71 | March 29 | vs Denver | Win | 120 | 105 | 48-23 | Won 3 | |
| 72 | April 1 | at Denver | Win | 116 | 99 | 49-23 | Won 4 | |
| 73 | April 2 | at Phoenix | Loss | 96 | 109 | 49-24 | Lost 1 | |
| 74 | April 4 | at Sacramento | Win | 108 | 94 | 50-24 | Won 1 | |
| 75 | April 6 | at Vancouver | Win | 94 | 85 | 51-24 | Won 2 | |
| 76 | April 8 | at LA Clippers | Win | 127 | 117 | 52-24 | Won 3 | |
| 77 | April 10 | vs Vancouver | Win | 102 | 94 | 53-24 | Won 4 | |
| 78 | April 11 | at Utah | Loss | 83 | 104 | 53-25 | Lost 1 | |
| 79 | April 13 | vs Seattle | Win | 113 | 73 | 54-25 | Won 1 | |
| 80 | April 15 | vs LA Clippers | Win | 123 | 119 | 55-25 | Won 2 | |
| 81 | April 18 | vs Dallas | Win | 112 | 102 | 56-25 | Won 3 | OT |
| 82 | April 20 | at San Antonio | Win | 103 | 99 | 57-25 | Won 4 | |

== Playoffs ==
1997 playoff game log
First Round: 3–0 (home: 2–0; road: 1–0)

| Game | Date | Team | Score | High points | High rebounds | High assists | Location Attendance | Series |
|---|---|---|---|---|---|---|---|---|
| 1 | April 24 | Minnesota | W 112–95 | Mario Elie (21) | Kevin Willis (13) | Clyde Drexler (8) | The Summit; 16,285 | 1–0 |
| 2 | April 26 | Minnesota | W 96–84 | Charles Barkley (20) | Charles Barkley (15) | Clyde Drexler (7) | The Summit; 16,285 | 2–0 |
| 3 | April 29 | @ Minnesota | W 125–120 | Matt Maloney (26) | Hakeem Olajuwon (11) | Clyde Drexler (9) | Target Center; 19,006 | 3–0 |

Conference semifinals: 4–3 (home: 2–2; road: 2–1)

| Game | Date | Team | Score | High points | High rebounds | High assists | Location Attendance | Series |
|---|---|---|---|---|---|---|---|---|
| 1 | May 5 | Seattle | W 112–102 | Clyde Drexler (22) | Hakeem Olajuwon (11) | Mario Elie (8) | The Summit; 16,285 | 1–0 |
| 2 | May 7 | Seattle | L 101–106 | Clyde Drexler (25) | Hakeem Olajuwon (12) | Clyde Drexler (8) | The Summit; 16,285 | 1–1 |
| 3 | May 9 | @ Seattle | W 97–93 | Hakeem Olajuwon (24) | Hakeem Olajuwon (11) | Sedale Threatt (5) | KeyArena; 17,072 | 2–1 |
| 4 | May 11 | @ Seattle | W 110–106 (OT) | Maloney, Barkley (26) | Charles Barkley (15) | Hakeem Olajuwon (9) | KeyArena; 17,072 | 3–1 |
| 5 | May 13 | Seattle | L 94–100 | Hakeem Olajuwon (31) | Charles Barkley (20) | Mario Elie (6) | The Summit; 16,285 | 3–2 |
| 6 | May 15 | @ Seattle | L 96–99 | Hakeem Olajuwon (30) | Charles Barkley (12) | Clyde Drexler (6) | KeyArena; 17,072 | 3–3 |
| 7 | May 17 | Seattle | W 96–91 | Clyde Drexler (24) | Charles Barkley (14) | Mario Elie (11) | The Summit; 16,285 | 4–3 |

Conference finals: 2–4 (home: 2–1; road: 0–3)

| Game | Date | Team | Score | High points | High rebounds | High assists | Location Attendance | Series |
|---|---|---|---|---|---|---|---|---|
| 1 | May 19 | @ Utah | L 86–101 | Hakeem Olajuwon (30) | Hakeem Olajuwon (13) | Hakeem Olajuwon (5) | Delta Center; 19,911 | 0–1 |
| 2 | May 21 | @ Utah | L 92–104 | Hakeem Olajuwon (30) | Charles Barkley (12) | Clyde Drexler (4) | Delta Center; 19,911 | 0–2 |
| 3 | May 23 | Utah | W 118–100 | Eddie Johnson (31) | Charles Barkley (16) | three players tied (6) | The Summit; 16,285 | 1–2 |
| 4 | May 25 | Utah | W 95–92 | Hakeem Olajuwon (27) | Charles Barkley (16) | Matt Maloney (6) | The Summit; 16,285 | 2–2 |
| 5 | May 27 | @ Utah | L 91–96 | Hakeem Olajuwon (33) | Hakeem Olajuwon (10) | Charles Barkley (5) | Delta Center; 19,911 | 2–3 |
| 6 | May 29 | Utah | L 100–103 | Clyde Drexler (33) | Hakeem Olajuwon (11) | Sedale Threatt (9) | The Summit; 16,285 | 2–4 |

1997 schedule

== Player statistics ==
Legend
| GP | Games played | GS | Games started | MPG | Minutes per game |
| FG% | Field-goal percentage | 3P% | 3-point field-goal percentage | FT% | Free-throw percentage |
| RPG | Rebounds per game | APG | Assists per game | SPG | Steals per game |
| BPG | Blocks per game | PPG | Points per game |

=== Season ===
| Player | GP | GS | MPG | FG% | 3FG% | FT% | RPG | APG | SPG | BPG | PPG |
|---|---|---|---|---|---|---|---|---|---|---|---|
| Charles Barkley | 53 | 53 | 37.9 | .484 | .283 | .694 | 13.5 | 4.7 | 1.3 | .5 | 19.2 |
| Elmer Bennett^{†} | 4 | 0 | 4.0 | .333 | .333 | .833 | .3 | 1.0 | .5 | .0 | 2.5 |
| Matt Bullard | 71 | 12 | 14.4 | .401 | .366 | .735 | 1.6 | .9 | .3 | .3 | 4.5 |
| Emanual Davis | 13 | 0 | 17.7 | .444 | .444 | .625 | 1.7 | 2.0 | .7 | .2 | 5.0 |
| Clyde Drexler | 62 | 62 | 36.6 | .442 | .355 | .750 | 6.0 | 5.7 | 1.9 | .6 | 18.0 |
| Mario Elie | 78 | 77 | 34.4 | .497 | .420 | .896 | 3.0 | 4.0 | 1.2 | .2 | 11.7 |
| Othella Harrington | 57 | 1 | 15.1 | .549 | .000 | .605 | 3.5 | .3 | .2 | .4 | 4.8 |
| Eddie Johnson^{†} | 24 | 2 | 25.3 | .447 | .388 | .854 | 4.1 | 1.5 | .4 | .0 | 11.5 |
| Charles Jones | 12 | 0 | 7.8 | .400 | | | 1.1 | .3 | .2 | .3 | .3 |
| Randy Livingston | 64 | 0 | 15.3 | .437 | .409 | .646 | 1.5 | 2.4 | .6 | .2 | 3.9 |
| Sam Mack | 52 | 10 | 17.4 | .401 | .331 | .833 | 2.0 | 1.1 | .6 | .1 | 5.6 |
| Matt Maloney | 82 | 82 | 29.1 | .441 | .404 | .763 | 2.0 | 3.7 | 1.0 | .0 | 9.4 |
| Tracy Moore | 27 | 1 | 8.8 | .388 | .256 | .710 | 1.0 | .7 | .2 | .0 | 3.7 |
| Hakeem Olajuwon | 78 | 78 | 36.6 | .510 | .313 | .787 | 9.2 | 3.0 | 1.5 | 2.2 | 23.2 |
| Brent Price | 25 | 0 | 15.6 | .419 | .321 | 1.000 | 1.2 | 2.6 | .7 | .0 | 5.0 |
| Joe Stephens | 2 | 0 | 4.5 | .200 | .333 | | 1.5 | .0 | 1.5 | .0 | 1.5 |
| Sedale Threatt | 21 | 0 | 15.9 | .378 | .400 | .750 | 1.1 | 1.9 | .7 | .1 | 3.3 |
| Kevin Willis | 75 | 32 | 26.2 | .481 | .143 | .693 | 7.5 | .9 | .6 | .4 | 11.2 |

=== Playoffs ===
| Player | GP | GS | MPG | FG% | 3FG% | FT% | RPG | APG | SPG | BPG | PPG |
|---|---|---|---|---|---|---|---|---|---|---|---|
| Charles Barkley | 16 | 16 | 37.8 | .434 | .289 | .769 | 12.0 | 3.4 | 1.2 | .4 | 17.9 |
| Matt Bullard | 2 | 0 | 3.5 | 1.000 | 1.000 | | 1.0 | .0 | .0 | .0 | 3.0 |
| Clyde Drexler | 16 | 16 | 38.9 | .436 | .373 | .778 | 5.6 | 4.8 | 1.6 | .4 | 18.1 |
| Mario Elie | 16 | 16 | 37.4 | .466 | .400 | .839 | 3.5 | 3.8 | .9 | .3 | 11.5 |
| Othella Harrington | 7 | 0 | 2.1 | .500 | | .700 | .6 | .0 | .0 | .0 | 1.3 |
| Eddie Johnson | 16 | 0 | 17.8 | .410 | .298 | .958 | 2.3 | .6 | .3 | .0 | 8.3 |
| Charles Jones | 1 | 0 | 2.0 | | | | .0 | 1.0 | .0 | .0 | .0 |
| Randy Livingston | 2 | 0 | 7.5 | .250 | 1.000 | | .0 | 2.0 | .5 | .0 | 1.5 |
| Matt Maloney | 16 | 16 | 32.9 | .399 | .398 | .667 | 1.2 | 3.1 | .6 | .2 | 11.2 |
| Hakeem Olajuwon | 16 | 16 | 39.3 | .590 | .000 | .731 | 10.9 | 3.4 | 2.1 | 2.6 | 23.1 |
| Sedale Threatt | 16 | 0 | 16.6 | .393 | .300 | .750 | 1.1 | 3.0 | .4 | .3 | 3.7 |
| Kevin Willis | 16 | 0 | 18.4 | .400 | .000 | .684 | 4.7 | .7 | .6 | .3 | 6.4 |

Player statistics citation:

== Awards and records ==
=== Awards ===
- Hakeem Olajuwon, All-NBA First Team
- Hakeem Olajuwon, NBA All-Defensive Second Team
- Matt Maloney, NBA All-Rookie Team 2nd Team

== Transactions ==
=== Trades ===
| August 19, 1996 | To Houston Rockets Charles Barkley | To Phoenix Suns Robert Horry; Sam Cassell; Mark Bryant; Chucky Brown |

=== Free agents ===
==== Additions ====
| Player' | Signed | Former team |

==== Subtractions ====
| Player | Left | New team |

Player transactions citation:

== See also ==
- 1996–97 NBA season
