= 1996–97 Los Angeles Clippers season =

NBA professional basketball team season

- Head coach: Bill Fitch
- Owners: Donald Sterling
- Arena: Los Angeles Memorial Sports Arena; Arrowhead Pond

Results
- Record: 36–46 (.439)
- Place: Division: 5th (Pacific); Conference: 8th (Western)
- Playoff finish: West First Round (lost to Jazz 0–3)
- Stats at Basketball Reference

Local media
- Television: KCAL-TV (Ralph Lawler, Bill Walton)
- Radio: KNNS (Rory Markas)

The 1996–97 Los Angeles Clippers season was the 27th season for the Los Angeles Clippers in the National Basketball Association, their 13th season in Los Angeles, California, and their third season in which they played occasional home games in Anaheim, California.

== Season summary ==
=== Off-season ===
The Clippers received the seventh overall pick in the 1996 NBA draft, and selected center Lorenzen Wright from the University of Memphis. During the off-season, the team signed free agents Darrick Martin, and former All-Star center Kevin Duckworth.

=== Regular season ===
With the addition of Wright and Martin, and despite the loss of Brian Williams to free agency, the Clippers got off to a 6–4 start to the regular season. However, the team posted a six-game losing streak in November afterwards, while losing ten of their next eleven games, which led to a 7–14 start to the season. The team continued to deal with injuries, as Duckworth only played just 26 games due to a sore heel injury, while Stanley Roberts only played just 18 games due to a back injury, and second-year guard Brent Barry only appeared in 59 games due to thumb and ankle injuries. Despite the injuries, the Clippers held a 19–25 record at the All-Star break, and finished in fifth place in the Pacific Division with a 36–46 record, which was below .500 in winning percentage, but still good enough to earn the eighth seed in the Western Conference, as the team qualified for the NBA playoffs; this was the Clippers' third playoff appearance since relocating from San Diego, California to Los Angeles in 1984, and their first since the 1992–93 season.

Loy Vaught averaged 14.9 points and 10.0 rebounds per game, while Malik Sealy averaged 13.5 points and 1.6 steals per game, and Rodney Rogers provided the team with 13.2 points and 5.1 rebounds per game. In addition, Martin contributed 10.9 points and 4.1 assists per game, while Wright provided with 7.3 points and 6.1 rebounds per game. Off the bench, Roberts averaged 9.5 points, 5.1 rebounds and 1.3 blocks per game, while Bo Outlaw provided with 7.6 points, 5.5 rebounds and 1.7 blocks per game, and also led the league with .609 in field-goal percentage, Barry contributed 7.5 points per game, and Lamond Murray contributed 7.4 points per game. Terry Dehere averaged 6.4 points per game, while three-point specialist Eric Piatkowski contributed 6.0 points per game, and Pooh Richardson provided with 5.6 points and 2.9 assists per game.

During the NBA All-Star weekend at the Gund Arena in Cleveland, Ohio, Wright was selected for the NBA Rookie Game, as a member of the Western Conference Rookie team. Outlaw finished tied in seventh place in Sixth Man of the Year voting, while head coach Bill Fitch finished tied in sixth place in Coach of the Year voting. The Clippers finished last in the NBA in home-game attendance, with an attendance of 232,895 at the Los Angeles Memorial Sports Arena during the regular season, which was 29th in the league.

=== NBA playoffs ===
In the Western Conference First Round of the 1997 NBA playoffs, the Clippers faced off against the top–seeded, and Midwest Division champion Utah Jazz, who were led by the trio of All-Star forward, and Most Valuable Player of the Year, Karl Malone, All-Star guard John Stockton, and Jeff Hornacek. The Clippers lost the first two games to the Jazz on the road at the Delta Center, before losing Game 3 at home, 104–92 at the Los Angeles Memorial Sports Arena, thus losing the series in a three-game sweep.

The Jazz would advance to the NBA Finals for the first time in franchise history, but would lose to the defending NBA champion Chicago Bulls in six games in the 1997 NBA Finals. This would also be the Clippers' final NBA playoff appearance until the 2005–06 season, as what would follow was an eight-year playoff drought.

=== Aftermath ===
Following the season, Sealy signed as a free agent with the Detroit Pistons, while Roberts was traded to the Minnesota Timberwolves on draft day, and Outlaw signed with the Orlando Magic. Meanwhile, Dehere signed with the Sacramento Kings, and Duckworth retired.

== Draft picks ==
Round	Pick	Player	Position	Nationality	College
1	7	Lorenzen Wright	C/PF	United States	Memphis
2	36	Doron Sheffer	F	Israel	UConn

== Roster ==
1996–97 Los Angeles Clippers roster
Players

Pos.	No.	Player	Height	Weight	DOB	From
G	31	Brent Barry	6 ft 7 in (2.01 m)	210 lb (95 kg)	1971–12–31	Oregon State
G	24	Terry Dehere	6 ft 2 in (1.88 m)	190 lb (86 kg)	1971–09–12	Seton Hall
C	00	Kevin Duckworth	7 ft 0 in (2.13 m)	300 lb (136 kg)	1964–04–01	Eastern Illinois
C	50	Rich Manning	6 ft 11 in (2.11 m)	260 lb (118 kg)	1970–06–23	Washington
G	15	Darrick Martin	5 ft 11 in (1.80 m)	170 lb (77 kg)	1971–03–06	UCLA
F	7	Lamond Murray	6 ft 7 in (2.01 m)	236 lb (107 kg)	1973–04–20	California
F	45	Bo Outlaw	6 ft 8 in (2.03 m)	210 lb (95 kg)	1971–04–13	Houston
G/F	52	Eric Piatkowski	6 ft 7 in (2.01 m)	215 lb (98 kg)	1970–09–30	Nebraska
G	2	Pooh Richardson	6 ft 1 in (1.85 m)	180 lb (82 kg)	1966–05–14	UCLA
C	53	Stanley Roberts	7 ft 0 in (2.13 m)	285 lb (129 kg)	1970–02–07	LSU
F	54	Rodney Rogers	6 ft 7 in (2.01 m)	260 lb (118 kg)	1971–06–20	Wake Forest
C	33	Dwayne Schintzius	7 ft 1 in (2.16 m)	260 lb (118 kg)	1968–10–14	Florida
G	21	Malik Sealy	6 ft 8 in (2.03 m)	190 lb (86 kg)	1970–02–01	St. John's
F	35	Loy Vaught	6 ft 9 in (2.06 m)	230 lb (104 kg)	1968–02–27	Michigan
C	55	Lorenzen Wright	6 ft 11 in (2.11 m)	240 lb (109 kg)	1975–11–04	Memphis

Coaches
Head coach
- Bill Fitch
Assistant(s)
- Jim Brewer
- Barry Hecker
- Rex Kalamian

Legend
- (DP) Unsigned draft pick
- (FA) Free agent
- (S) Suspended
- Injured

Roster
Updated: 2009-10-04

=== Roster Notes ===
A number of players from the 1996–97 roster have either died prematurely and/or ended up in unfortunate circumstances; these players are:

- Center Stanley Roberts (banned from the NBA for drug use in 1999).
- Guard Malik Sealy (died in an automobile accident in 2000 at age 30).
- Center Kevin Duckworth (died of heart failure in 2008 at age 44).
- Forward Rodney Rogers (became paralyzed after a dirt bike accident in 2008 at age 37; died in 2025 at age 54).
- Center Lorenzen Wright (murdered by his ex-wife in 2010 at age 34).
- Center Dwayne Schintzius (died from cancer complications in 2012 at age 43).

Brent Barry, had a long and productive career in the NBA, winning two titles (2005 and 2007) with the San Antonio Spurs, as well as being a consistent starter for the Seattle SuperSonics in the 2000s, but was divorced from his wife Erin in 2011, allegedly due to an extra-marital affair with his Spurs teammate Tony Parker.

== Regular season ==
=== Season standings ===
Pacific Division	W	L	PCT	GB	Home	Road	Div
y-Seattle SuperSonics	57	25	.695	–	31–10	26–15	16–8
x-Los Angeles Lakers	56	26	.683	1	31–10	25–16	18–6
x-Portland Trail Blazers	49	33	.598	8	29–12	20–21	15–9
x-Phoenix Suns	40	42	.488	17	25–16	15–26	13–11
x-Los Angeles Clippers	36	46	.439	21	21–20	15–26	10–14
Sacramento Kings	34	48	.415	23	22–19	12–29	8–16
Golden State Warriors	30	52	.366	27	18–23	12–29	4–20

1996–97 NBA West standings
#	Western Conference				
#	Team	W	L	PCT	GB
1	c-Utah Jazz	64	18	.780	–
2	y-Seattle SuperSonics	57	25	.695	7
3	x-Houston Rockets	57	25	.695	7
4	x-Los Angeles Lakers	56	26	.683	8
5	x-Portland Trail Blazers	49	33	.598	15
6	x-Minnesota Timberwolves	40	42	.488	24
7	x-Phoenix Suns	40	42	.488	24
8	x-Los Angeles Clippers	36	46	.439	28
9	Sacramento Kings	34	48	.415	30
10	Golden State Warriors	30	52	.366	34
11	Dallas Mavericks	24	58	.293	40
12	Denver Nuggets	21	61	.256	43
13	San Antonio Spurs	20	62	.244	44
14	Vancouver Grizzlies	14	68	.171	50

z – clinched division title
y – clinched division title
x – clinched playoff spot

== Playoffs ==
1997 playoff game log
First round: 0–3 (home: 0–1; road: 0–2)

Game	Date	Team	Score	High points	High rebounds	High assists	Location Attendance	Series
1	April 24	@ Utah	L 86–106	Loy Vaught (20)	Loy Vaught (11)	three players tied (3)	Delta Center; 19,911	0–1
2	April 26	@ Utah	L 99–105	Lorenzen Wright (17)	Loy Vaught (9)	Darrick Martin (6)	Delta Center; 19,911	0–2
3	April 28	Utah	L 92–104	Loy Vaught (20)	Vaught, Wright (9)	Darrick Martin (5)	Los Angeles Memorial Sports Arena; 11,747	0–3

1997 schedule

== Player statistics ==
Legend
GP	Games played	GS	Games started	MPG	Minutes per game
FG%	Field-goal percentage	3P%	3-point field-goal percentage	FT%	Free-throw percentage
RPG	Rebounds per game	APG	Assists per game	SPG	Steals per game
BPG	Blocks per game	PPG	Points per game

=== Season ===
Player	GP	GS	MPG	FG%	3P%	FT%	RPG	APG	SPG	BPG	PPG
Brent Barry	59	0	18.5	.409	.324	.817	1.9	2.6	.9	.3	7.5
Terry Dehere	73	3	14.4	.386	.325	.824	1.3	2.2	.4	.0	6.4
Kevin Duckworth	26	22	14.8	.437	.750	.688	2.3	.6	.3	.4	4.0
Rich Manning	10	1	7.3	.412	.000	.500	1.6	.1	.1	.1	3.1
Darrick Martin	82	64	22.2	.407	.389	.872	1.4	4.1	.7	.0	10.9
Lamond Murray	74	1	17.5	.416	.341	.739	3.1	.8	.7	.4	7.4
Bo Outlaw	82	25	26.8	.609	.000	.504	5.5	1.9	1.1	1.7	7.6
Eric Piatkowski	65	0	11.5	.450	.425	.821	1.6	.8	.5	.2	6.0
Pooh Richardson	59	18	18.1	.381	.328	.605	1.7	2.9	.9	.1	5.6
Stanley Roberts	18	2	21.0	.426	.	.703	5.1	.5	.4	1.3	9.5
Rodney Rogers	81	62	30.6	.462	.361	.663	5.1	2.7	1.1	.8	13.2
Dwayne Schintzius	15	0	7.7	.361	.500	.875	1.5	.3	.1	.6	2.3
Malik Sealy	80	79	30.7	.396	.356	.876	3.0	2.1	1.6	.6	13.5
Loy Vaught	82	82	34.6	.500	.167	.702	10.0	1.3	1.0	.3	14.9
Lorenzen Wright	77	51	25.1	.481	.250	.587	6.1	.6	.6	.8	7.3

=== Playoffs ===
Player	GP	GS	MPG	FG%	3P%	FT%	RPG	APG	SPG	BPG	PPG
Brent Barry	3	0	28.0	.407	.455	.889	2.3	3.3	1.3	.0	11.7
Terry Dehere	2	0	2.5	.000	.000	.	.5	.0	.0	.0	.0
Rich Manning	3	0	7.0	.222	.	.833	1.3	.3	.0	.3	3.0
Darrick Martin	3	3	25.7	.440	.556	.667	.7	4.3	.0	.0	11.0
Lamond Murray	3	0	21.7	.300	.250	1.000	3.7	1.0	.7	1.0	7.0
Bo Outlaw	3	0	22.0	.545	.000	.300	4.7	1.3	.3	.7	5.0
Eric Piatkowski	3	0	12.7	.364	.400	.857	.7	.0	.3	.0	5.3
Pooh Richardson	2	0	9.0	.500	.000	.000	.0	1.5	.5	.0	2.0
Rodney Rogers	3	3	28.3	.414	.200	.750	2.3	2.0	1.3	1.0	10.7
Malik Sealy	3	3	26.3	.480	.200	.733	1.0	1.7	.0	.0	12.0
Loy Vaught	3	3	30.0	.613	.333	.667	9.0	.7	1.0	.7	15.0
Lorenzen Wright	3	3	30.7	.406	.	1.000	7.3	.7	1.0	.7	10.3

Player statistics citation:

== Transactions ==
The Clippers have been involved in the following transactions during the 1996–97 season.

=== Trades ===
No trades occurred for this team this season.

=== Free agents ===
==== Additions ====
Player	Signed	Former team
Darrick Martin	July 11	Vancouver Grizzlies
Dwayne Schintzius	September 19	Indiana Pacers
Kevin Duckworth	October 10	Milwaukee Bucks
Rich Manning	April 1	Vancouver Grizzlies

==== Subtractions ====
Player	Left	New team
Keith Tower	waived, July 11	Milwaukee Bucks
Antonio Harvey	free agency, November 15	Seattle SuperSonics
Brian Williams	free agency, April 2	Chicago Bulls

Player transactions citation:

== See also ==
- 1996–97 NBA season
