= 1996–97 Sacramento Kings season =

NBA professional basketball team season

- Head coach: Garry St. Jean (fired); Eddie Jordan
- President: Geoff Petrie
- General manager: Geoff Petrie
- Owner: Jim Thomas
- Arena: ARCO Arena

Results
- Record: 34–48 (.415)
- Place: Division: 6th (Pacific); Conference: 9th (Western)
- Playoff finish: Did not qualify
- Stats at Basketball Reference

Local media
- Television: KPWB-TV; SportsChannel Pacific
- Radio: KHTK

The 1996–97 Sacramento Kings season was the 48th season for the Sacramento Kings in the National Basketball Association, and their 12th season in Sacramento, California.

== Season summary ==
=== Off-season ===
The Kings had the 14th overall pick in the 1996 NBA draft, and selected Serbian small forward Peja Stojaković; however, Stojaković had a five-year contract with his team, PAOK BC in the Greek Basketball League, and would not play for the Kings until the 1998–99 season. During the off-season, the team acquired Mahmoud Abdul-Rauf from the Denver Nuggets, and later on signed free agent Jeff Grayer in January.

=== Regular season ===
With the addition of Abdul-Rauf, and coming off of their first NBA playoff appearance in ten years, the Kings struggled with an 8–17 start to the regular season, as Brian Grant only played just 24 games due to a shoulder injury, and Billy Owens missed 16 games early into the season due to a groin injury. The Kings soon recovered posting a five-game winning streak in December afterwards, and later on held a 21–28 record at the All-Star break. However, after holding a 28–32 record as of March 5, 1997, the team posted a seven-game losing streak as head coach Garry St. Jean was fired, and replaced with assistant coach Eddie Jordan for the remainder of the season. The Kings posted a six-game losing streak between March and April, and finished in sixth place in the Pacific Division with a 34–48 record, missing the NBA playoffs by finishing just two games behind the 8th–seeded Los Angeles Clippers.

Mitch Richmond averaged 25.9 points, 4.2 assists and 1.5 steals per game, led the Kings with 204 three-point field goals, and was named to the All-NBA Second Team. In addition, Abdul-Rauf finished second on the team in scoring with 13.7 points per game, while Olden Polynice provided the team with 12.5 points and 9.4 rebounds per game, second-year forward Corliss Williamson showed improvement averaging 11.6 points per game, Owens provided with 11.0 points and 5.9 rebounds per game, and Grant contributed 10.5 points and 5.9 rebounds per game. Meanwhile, Michael Smith was the team's starting power forward in Grant's absence, averaging 6.6 points and 9.5 rebounds per game, second-year guard Tyus Edney provided with 6.9 points and 3.2 assists per game, and Kevin Gamble contributed 5.0 points per game, and shot .482 in three-point field-goal percentage.

During the NBA All-Star weekend at the Gund Arena in Cleveland, Ohio, Richmond was selected for the 1997 NBA All-Star Game, as a member of the Western Conference All-Star team; he also finished tied in 13th place in Most Valuable Player voting. The Kings finished tenth in the NBA in home-game attendance, with an attendance of 709,993 at the ARCO Arena II during the regular season.

=== Aftermath ===
Following the season, Grant signed as a free agent with the Portland Trail Blazers, while Edney signed with the Boston Celtics, Duane Causwell was traded to the Miami Heat, and Grayer was released to free agency. Meanwhile, Lionel Simmons retired due to knee surgery, after playing seven seasons in the NBA with the Kings.

== Draft picks ==
Round	Pick	Player	Position	Nationality	College
1	14	Peja Stojaković	SF	Yugoslavia	
2	41	Jason Sasser	SF	United States	Texas Tech

== Roster ==
1996–97 Sacramento Kings roster
Players

Pos.	No.	Player	Height	Weight	DOB	From
G	3	Mahmoud Abdul-Rauf	6 ft 1 in (1.85 m)	162 lb (73 kg)	1969–03–09	LSU
C	31	Duane Causwell	7 ft 0 in (2.13 m)	240 lb (109 kg)	1968–05–31	Temple
G	5	Tyus Edney	5 ft 10 in (1.78 m)	152 lb (69 kg)	1973–02–14	UCLA
G/F	40	Kevin Gamble	6 ft 5 in (1.96 m)	210 lb (95 kg)	1965–11–13	Iowa
F	33	Brian Grant	6 ft 9 in (2.06 m)	254 lb (115 kg)	1972–03–05	Xavier
G	20	Jeff Grayer	6 ft 5 in (1.96 m)	200 lb (91 kg)	1965–12–17	Iowa State
G	7	Bobby Hurley	6 ft 0 in (1.83 m)	165 lb (75 kg)	1971–06–28	Duke
F	30	Billy Owens	6 ft 8 in (2.03 m)	220 lb (100 kg)	1969–05–01	Syracuse
C	0	Olden Polynice	6 ft 11 in (2.11 m)	220 lb (100 kg)	1964–11–21	Virginia
G	2	Mitch Richmond	6 ft 5 in (1.96 m)	215 lb (98 kg)	1965–06–30	Kansas State
C	32	Kevin Salvadori	7 ft 0 in (2.13 m)	231 lb (105 kg)	1970–12–30	North Carolina
F	22	Lionel Simmons	6 ft 7 in (2.01 m)	210 lb (95 kg)	1968–11–14	La Salle
F	34	Michael Smith	6 ft 8 in (2.03 m)	230 lb (104 kg)	1972–03–28	Providence
F	4	Corliss Williamson	6 ft 7 in (2.01 m)	245 lb (111 kg)	1973–12–04	Arkansas

Coaches
Head coach
- Eddie Jordan
Assistant(s)
- Mike Bratz
- Pete Carril

Legend
- (DP) Unsigned draft pick
- (FA) Free agent
- (S) Suspended
- Injured

Roster
Updated: March 21, 1997

== Regular season ==
=== Season standings ===
Pacific Division	W	L	PCT	GB	Home	Road	Div
y-Seattle SuperSonics	57	25	.695	–	31–10	26–15	16–8
x-Los Angeles Lakers	56	26	.683	1	31–10	25–16	18–6
x-Portland Trail Blazers	49	33	.598	8	29–12	20–21	15–9
x-Phoenix Suns	40	42	.488	17	25–16	15–26	13–11
x-Los Angeles Clippers	36	46	.439	21	21–20	15–26	10–14
Sacramento Kings	34	48	.415	23	22–19	12–29	8–16
Golden State Warriors	30	52	.366	27	18–23	12–29	4–20

1996–97 NBA West standings
#	Western Conference				
#	Team	W	L	PCT	GB
1	c-Utah Jazz	64	18	.780	–
2	y-Seattle SuperSonics	57	25	.695	7
3	x-Houston Rockets	57	25	.695	7
4	x-Los Angeles Lakers	56	26	.683	8
5	x-Portland Trail Blazers	49	33	.598	15
6	x-Minnesota Timberwolves	40	42	.488	24
7	x-Phoenix Suns	40	42	.488	24
8	x-Los Angeles Clippers	36	46	.439	28
9	Sacramento Kings	34	48	.415	30
10	Golden State Warriors	30	52	.366	34
11	Dallas Mavericks	24	58	.293	40
12	Denver Nuggets	21	61	.256	43
13	San Antonio Spurs	20	62	.244	44
14	Vancouver Grizzlies	14	68	.171	50

z - clinched division title
y - clinched division title
x - clinched playoff spot

== Game log ==
1996–97 game log
Total: 34–48 (Home: 22–19; Road: 12–29)
November: 5–11 (home: 2–4; road: 3–7)

Game	Date	Team	Score	High points	High rebounds	High assists	Location Attendance	Record
1	November 1	@ Houston	L 85–96	Mahmoud Abdul-Rauf (17)	Michael Smith (10)	Mahmoud Abdul-Rauf (5)	The Summit; 16,285	0–1
2	November 2	@ Dallas	W 107–94	Mitch Richmond (24)	Brian Grant (15)	Tie (3)	Reunion Arena; 18,042	1–1
3	November 5	Houston	L 80–102	Mahmoud Abdul-Rauf (16)	Olden Polynice (11)	Mitch Richmond (4)	ARCO Arena; 17,317	1–2
4	November 7	Atlanta	L 87–91	Mitch Richmond (29)	Olden Polynice (15)	Mahmoud Abdul-Rauf (7)	ARCO Arena; 17,317	1–3
5	November 9	Portland	W 103–102	Mitch Richmond (29)	Tie (7)	Mitch Richmond (6)	ARCO Arena; 17,317	2–3
6	November 11	Seattle	L 94–110	Mitch Richmond (28)	Michael Smith (17)	Owens, Richmond (5)	ARCO Arena; 17,317	2–4
7	November 13	@ Utah	L 74–105	Mitch Richmond (16)	Duane Causwell (8)	Abdul-Rauf, Owens (4)	Delta Center; 19,283	2–5
8	November 15	Milwaukee	W 103–99	Mitch Richmond (30)	Olden Polynice (12)	Lionel Simmons (7)	ARCO Arena; 17,317	3–5
9	November 16	@ Seattle	L 96–108	Mitch Richmond (27)	Billy Owens (8)	Michael Smith (5)	KeyArena; 17,072	3–6
10	November 18	@ Vancouver	W 84–83	Billy Owens (17)	Olden Polynice (11)	Mitch Richmond (5)	General Motors Place; 14,672	4–6
11	November 19	@ Portland	L 90–92	Mahmoud Abdul-Rauf (31)	Olden Polynice (12)	Tie (3)	Rose Garden Arena; 20,245	4–7
12	November 22	Miami	L 108–111	Mitch Richmond (32)	Michael Smith (9)	Mitch Richmond (6)	ARCO Arena; 17,317	4–8
13	November 24	@ Cleveland	L 74–103	Mitch Richmond (23)	Lionel Simmons (9)	Lionel Simmons (4)	Gund Arena; 13,786	4–9
14	November 26	@ Toronto	W 98–87	Mahmoud Abdul-Rauf (18)	Billy Owens (8)	Mitch Richmond (7)	SkyDome; 15,037	5–9
15	November 28	@ Indiana	L 83–101	Mitch Richmond (18)	Billy Owens (7)	Owens, Polynice (4)	Market Square Arena; 14,732	5–10
16	November 30	@ New York	L 101–115	Mitch Richmond (25)	Olden Polynice (8)	Abdul-Rauf, Richmond (5)	Madison Square Garden; 19,763	5–11

December: 8–7 (home: 7–3; road: 1–4)

Game	Date	Team	Score	High points	High rebounds	High assists	Location Attendance	Record
17	December 1	@ Detroit	L 66–95	Corliss Williamson (15)	Michael Smith (9)	Tie (3)	The Palace of Auburn Hills; 14,063	5–12
18	December 3	@ Minnesota	W 96–89	Mitch Richmond (29)	Billy Owens (11)	Owens, Simmons (4)	Target Center; 11,191	6–12
19	December 6	Phoenix	L 95–101	Mitch Richmond (22)	Billy Owens (16)	Mitch Richmond (7)	ARCO Arena; 17,317	6–13
20	December 8	Orlando	W 91–84	Mitch Richmond (22)	Michael Smith (13)	Tyus Edney (7)	ARCO Arena; 17,317	7–13
21	December 10	L. A. Lakers	L 90–92	Olden Polynice (18)	Olden Polynice (12)	Billy Owens (6)	ARCO Arena; 17,317	7–14
22	December 12	Dallas	W 93–86	Mitch Richmond (24)	Michael Smith (12)	Mitch Richmond (6)	ARCO Arena; 17,317	8–14
23	December 14	@ L. A. Clippers	L 94–106	Mitch Richmond (33)	Olden Polynice (10)	Edney, Hurley (4)	Los Angeles Memorial Sports Arena; 7,269	8–15
24	December 16	Washington	L 89–97	Mitch Richmond (28)	Michael Smith (15)	Bobby Hurley (7)	ARCO Arena; 17,317	8–16
25	December 18	@ Denver	L 79–95	Mitch Richmond (32)	Olden Polynice (18)	Kevin Gamble (5)	McNichols Sports Arena; 7,682	8–17
26	December 19	Minnesota	W 112–105	Mitch Richmond (31)	Olden Polynice (12)	Kevin Gamble (4)	ARCO Arena; 17,317	9–17
27	December 21	Portland	W 101–99	Mitch Richmond (37)	Michael Smith (13)	Tyus Edney (7)	ARCO Arena; 17,317	10–17
28	December 23	L. A. Clippers	W 100–88	Mitch Richmond (23)	Olden Polynice (14)	Kevin Gamble (5)	ARCO Arena; 17,317	11–17
29	December 26	Vancouver	W 111–88	Polynice, Richmond (18)	Michael Smith (12)	Michael Smith (6)	ARCO Arena; 17,317	12–17
30	December 28	Boston	W 126–96	Mitch Richmond (27)	Michael Smith (10)	Tyus Edney (9)	ARCO Arena; 17,317	13–17
31	December 30	@ Phoenix	L 88–100	Mitch Richmond (40)	Billy Owens (12)	Mitch Richmond (5)	America West Arena; 19,023	13–18

January: 6–8 (home: 3–4; road: 3–4)

Game	Date	Team	Score	High points	High rebounds	High assists	Location Attendance	Record
32	January 2	L. A. Lakers	L 83–90	Mitch Richmond (32)	Olden Polynice (15)	Bobby Hurley (6)	ARCO Arena; 17,317	13–19
33	January 3	@ L. A. Lakers	L 93–100	Mitch Richmond (33)	Olden Polynice (9)	Bobby Hurley (7)	Great Western Forum; 17,505	13–20
34	January 5	Philadelphia	W 107–106	Mahmoud Abdul-Rauf (25)	Michael Smith (12)	Olden Polynice (7)	ARCO Arena; 17,317	14–20
35	January 7	Denver	L 96–109	Mitch Richmond (19)	Olden Polynice (13)	Tyus Edney (9)	ARCO Arena; 17,317	14–21
36	January 11	@ Vancouver	W 109–101	Mitch Richmond (32)	Michael Smith (11)	Mitch Richmond (13)	General Motors Place; 16,092	15–21
37	January 12	Charlotte	L 93–97	Mahmoud Abdul-Rauf (22)	Michael Smith (14)	Mitch Richmond (5)	ARCO Arena; 17,317	15–22
38	January 14	Indiana	W 105–98	Mitch Richmond (37)	Billy Owens (11)	Tyus Edney (5)	ARCO Arena; 17,317	16–22
39	January 16	@ Houston	L 80–89	Mitch Richmond (23)	Olden Polynice (16)	Mitch Richmond (4)	The Summit; 16,285	16–23
40	January 17	@ San Antonio	L 76–96	Corliss Williamson (16)	Causwell, Smith (12)	Gamble, Smith (5)	Alamodome; 13,938	16–24
41	January 22	Detroit	W 97–92	Mitch Richmond (38)	Michael Smith (12)	Mitch Richmond (10)	ARCO Arena; 17,317	17–24
42	January 24	@ Philadelphia	W 107–92	Mitch Richmond (33)	Olden Polynice (14)	Hurley, Richmond (8)	CoreStates Center; 13,428	18–24
43	January 25	@ Washington	L 105–113	Mitch Richmond (38)	Michael Smith (11)	Mitch Richmond (6)	US Airways Arena; 18,756	18–25
44	January 28	@ Minnesota	W 91–88	Mitch Richmond (28)	Michael Smith (14)	Mitch Richmond (9)	Target Center; 14,119	19–25
45	January 30	@ Chicago	L 93–111	Mitch Richmond (28)	Michael Smith (11)	Abdul-Rauf, Richmond (6)	ARCO Arena; 17,317	19–26

February: 6–6 (home: 3–2; road: 3–4)

Game	Date	Team	Score	High points	High rebounds	High assists	Location Attendance	Record
46	February 1	@ Denver	W 113–107	Mitch Richmond (35)	Mitch Richmond (13)	Abdul-Rauf, Polynice (5)	McNichols Sports Arena; 10,821	20–26
47	February 3	@ San Antonio	W 85–79	Mitch Richmond (26)	Olden Polynice (17)	Tie (4)	Alamodome; 12,764	21–26
48	February 4	@ Dallas	L 96–104	Mitch Richmond (31)	Olden Polynice (8)	Mitch Richmond (5)	Reunion Arena; 12,338	21–27
49	February 6	@ Charlotte	L 100–115	Mitch Richmond (37)	Michael Smith (11)	Mitch Richmond (5)	Charlotte Coliseum; 24,042	21–28
50	February 11	Utah	L 98–120	Mitch Richmond (34)	Olden Polynice (11)	Tyus Edney (5)	ARCO Arena; 17,317	21–29
51	February 13	L. A. Clippers	W 105–98	Mitch Richmond (41)	Olden Polynice (15)	Mitch Richmond (7)	ARCO Arena; 17,317	22–29
52	February 16	Golden State	W 105–85	Olden Polynice (23)	Michael Smith (16)	Mahmoud Abdul-Rauf (8)	ARCO Arena; 17,317	23–29
53	February 18	Minnesota	W 95–84	Mitch Richmond (20)	Olden Polynice (21)	Mitch Richmond (7)	ARCO Arena; 17,317	24–29
54	February 20	New York	L 87–109	Mitch Richmond (25)	Michael Smith (9)	Edney, Smith (4)	ARCO Arena; 17,317	24–30
55	February 25	@ New Jersey	L 90–97	Mitch Richmond (32)	Michael Smith (17)	Olden Polynice (7)	Continental Airlines Arena; 13,010	24–31
56	February 26	@ Boston	W 111–105	Mitch Richmond (38)	Olden Polynice (14)	Olden Polynice (8)	FleetCenter; 15,651	25–31
57	February 28	@ Chicago	L 108–126	Mahmoud Abdul-Rauf (26)	Olden Polynice (11)	Mitch Richmond (9)	United Center; 23,836	25–32

1996–97 schedule

== Player statistics ==
Legend
GP	Games played	GS	Games started	MPG	Minutes per game
FG%	Field-goal percentage	3P%	3-point field-goal percentage	FT%	Free-throw percentage
RPG	Rebounds per game	APG	Assists per game	SPG	Steals per game
BPG	Blocks per game	PPG	Points per game

=== Regular season ===
Player	GP	GS	MPG	FG%	3P%	FT%	RPG	APG	SPG	BPG	PPG
Olden Polynice	82	82	35.3	.457	.000	.562	9.4	2.2	.6	1.0	12.5
Mitch Richmond	81	81	38.6	.454	.428	.861	3.9	4.2	1.5	.3	25.9
Michael Smith	81	52	31.2	.539		.496	9.5	2.4	1.0	.7	6.6
Corliss Williamson	79	31	25.2	.498	.000	.689	4.1	1.6	.8	.6	11.6
Mahmoud Abdul-Rauf	75	51	28.4	.445	.382	.846	1.6	2.5	.7	.1	13.7
Tyus Edney	70	20	19.7	.384	.190	.823	1.6	3.2	.9	.0	6.9
Billy Owens	66	56	30.2	.467	.347	.697	5.9	2.8	.9	.4	11.0
Kevin Gamble	62	2	15.4	.430	.482	.700	1.7	1.2	.3	.3	5.0
Bobby Hurley	49	12	12.9	.368	.311	.698	.8	3.0	.6	.1	2.9
Duane Causwell	46	8	12.6	.511	.667	.541	2.8	.4	.3	.8	2.6
Lionel Simmons	41	0	12.7	.331	.233	.875	2.5	1.4	.2	.3	3.4
Jeff Grayer	25	0	12.6	.458	.364	.550	1.5	1.0	.3	.3	3.6
Brian Grant	24	15	25.3	.440		.778	5.9	1.2	.8	1.0	10.5
Kevin Salvadori	23	0	6.7	.364		.722	1.1	.4	.1	.6	1.6
Lloyd Daniels^{†}	5	0	5.6	.125	.182		.8	.2	.2	.0	1.2
Devin Gray^{†}	3	0	8.3	.273		.500	3.0	.7	1.0	.0	2.7

- ^{†} Denotes player spent time with another team in the season. Stats reflect time with the Kings only.

Player statistics citation:

== Awards and records ==
- Mitch Richmond, All-NBA Second Team

== See also ==
- 1996-97 NBA season
