= 1996–97 Minnesota Timberwolves season =

NBA professional basketball team season

- Head coach: Flip Saunders
- General manager: Kevin McHale
- Owner: Glen Taylor
- Arena: Target Center

Results
- Record: 40–42 (.488)
- Place: Division: 3rd (Midwest); Conference: 6th (Western)
- Playoff finish: First round (lost to Rockets 0–3)
- Stats at Basketball Reference

Local media
- Television: KARE; KLGT-TV; Midwest Sports Channel
- Radio: KFAN

The 1996–97 Minnesota Timberwolves season was the eighth season for the Minnesota Timberwolves in the National Basketball Association.

== Season summary ==
=== Off-season ===
The Timberwolves received the fifth overall pick in the 1996 NBA draft, and selected shooting guard Ray Allen from the University of Connecticut; however, the team soon traded Allen to the Milwaukee Bucks in exchange for rookie point guard, and first-round draft pick Stephon Marbury out of Georgia Tech University on draft day. During the off-season, the team acquired James Robinson from the Portland Trail Blazers, and second-year center Cherokee Parks from the Dallas Mavericks, while signing free agents, rookie center Dean Garrett, second-year guard Chris Carr, and Stojko Vrankovic. However, Michael Williams would miss the entire regular season due to a strained plantar fascia in his left heel.

For the season, the Timberwolves redesigned their primary logo, replacing the color blue with slated blue and black to their color scheme of green, silver and white. The team's primary logo featured a silver wolf with yellow eyes and a black shadow on the left side of its face, along with black and slated blue outlines; the wolf is surrounded by green pine trees with black outlines, above the state name Minnesota in silver letters on a black rectangle, and the team name "Timberwolves" in slated blue letters with black and white outlines. The team also redesigned their home and road uniforms, which featured a black trim of green pine trees on their jerseys, waistband, and the bottom left leg of their shorts; the right leg featured the team's primary logo of a wolf's head. The home uniforms remained white, while the road uniforms were changed from royal blue to slated blue.

The team's new primary logo, and new uniforms would both remain in use until 2008, where the logo would be slightly redesigned.

=== Regular season ===
With the addition of Marbury, Garrett and Robinson, the Timberwolves got off to a 7–8 start to the regular season. However, the team posted a six-game losing streak afterwards, while losing nine of their next ten games, leading to an 8–17 start to the season. The Timberwolves soon recovered and later on held a 23–25 record at the All-Star break. The Timberwolves showed improvement by finishing in third place in the Midwest Division with a 40–42 record, which was below .500 in winning percentage, but still good enough to earn the sixth seed in the Western Conference; the team qualified for their first ever NBA playoff appearance in franchise history, ending a seven-year playoff drought.

Tom Gugliotta averaged 20.6 points, 8.7 rebounds, 4.1 assists and 1.6 steals per game, while second-year star Kevin Garnett showed improvement averaging 17.0 points, 8.0 rebounds, 1.4 steals and 2.1 blocks per game, and Marbury provided the team with 15.8 points and 7.8 assists per game, and contributed 102 three-point field goals, playing in 67 games due to ankle and thigh injuries, as he was named to the NBA All-Rookie First Team. In addition, Sam Mitchell played a sixth man role off the bench, averaging 9.3 points and 4.0 rebounds per game, while Garrett provided with 8.0 points, 7.3 rebounds and 1.4 blocks per game, and Doug West contributed 7.8 points per game. Off the bench, Robinson contributed 8.3 points per game and 102 three-point field goals, while Terry Porter provided with 6.9 points and 3.6 assists per game, Carr contributed 6.1 points per game, and Vrankovic averaged 3.4 points, 3.2 rebounds and 1.3 blocks per game, starting at center for half of the regular season.

During the NBA All-Star weekend at the Gund Arena in Cleveland, Ohio, Gugliotta and Garnett were both selected for the 1997 NBA All-Star Game, as members of the Western Conference All-Star team; it was Garnett's first ever All-Star appearance, and the first and only All-Star appearance for Gugliotta. Meanwhile, Marbury was selected for the NBA Rookie Game, as a member of the Western Conference Rookie team, but did not participate due to a thigh injury, and Carr participated in the NBA Slam Dunk Contest. Gugliotta finished tied in 17th place in Most Valuable Player voting, while Garnett finished in eighth place in Most Improved Player voting, with Gugliotta finishing tied in ninth place; Marbury finished in second place in Rookie of the Year voting, behind Allen Iverson of the Philadelphia 76ers, and head coach Flip Saunders finished tied in sixth place in Coach of the Year voting.

The Timberwolves finished 14th in the NBA in home-game attendance, with an attendance of 697,727 at the Target Center during the regular season.

=== NBA playoffs ===
In the Western Conference First Round of the 1997 NBA playoffs, the Timberwolves faced off against the 3rd–seeded Houston Rockets, who were led by the All-Star trio of Hakeem Olajuwon, Charles Barkley and Clyde Drexler. The Timberwolves lost the first two games to the Rockets on the road at The Summit, before losing Game 3 at home, 125–120 at the Target Center, thus losing the series in a three-game sweep. It was also Garnett's first ever NBA playoff appearance.

=== Aftermath ===
Following the season, Garrett signed as a free agent with the Denver Nuggets, while Robinson signed with the Los Angeles Clippers, and Vrankovic was traded to the Clippers.

== Draft picks ==
Round	Pick	Player	Position	Nationality	College
1	5	Ray Allen	SG	United States	Connecticut

== Roster ==
1996–97 Minnesota Timberwolves roster
Players

Pos.	No.	Player	Height	Weight	DOB	From
G	43	Chris Carr	6 ft 5 in (1.96 m)	207 lb (94 kg)	1974–03–12	Southern Illinois
F	17	Bill Curley (injured) (IN)	6 ft 9 in (2.06 m)	220 lb (100 kg)	1972–05–29	Boston College
F	21	Kevin Garnett	6 ft 11 in (2.11 m)	220 lb (100 kg)	1976–05–19	Farragut Academy HS (IL)
C	22	Dean Garrett	6 ft 10 in (2.08 m)	225 lb (102 kg)	1966–11–27	Indiana
F	24	Tom Gugliotta	6 ft 10 in (2.08 m)	240 lb (109 kg)	1969–12–19	NC State
G	10	Shane Heal	6 ft 0 in (1.83 m)	180 lb (82 kg)	1970–09–06	Upper Yarra Secondary College (HS)
G	31	Reggie Jordan	6 ft 4 in (1.93 m)	195 lb (88 kg)	1968–01–26	New Mexico State
G	3	Stephon Marbury	6 ft 2 in (1.88 m)	180 lb (82 kg)	1977–02–20	Georgia Tech
F	42	Sam Mitchell	6 ft 6 in (1.98 m)	210 lb (95 kg)	1963–09–02	Mercer
C	44	Cherokee Parks	6 ft 11 in (2.11 m)	235 lb (107 kg)	1972–10–11	Duke
G	30	Terry Porter	6 ft 3 in (1.91 m)	195 lb (88 kg)	1963–04–08	UW–Stevens Point
G	26	James Robinson	6 ft 2 in (1.88 m)	180 lb (82 kg)	1970–08–31	Alabama
C	11	Stojko Vranković	7 ft 2 in (2.18 m)	260 lb (118 kg)	1964–01–22	Croatia
G	5	Doug West	6 ft 6 in (1.98 m)	200 lb (91 kg)	1967–05–27	Villanova
G	4	Micheal Williams (injured) (IN)	6 ft 2 in (1.88 m)	175 lb (79 kg)	1966–07–23	Baylor

Coaches
Head coach
- Flip Saunders
Assistant(s)
- Greg Ballard
- Mike Schuler
- Jerry Sichting
- Randy Wittman

Legend
- (DP) Unsigned draft pick
- (FA) Free agent
- (S) Suspended
- (IN) Inactive
- Injured

Roster

=== Roster Notes ===
- Power forward Bill Curley was on the injured reserve list rehabilitating from surgery on his right knee, and missed the entire regular season.
- Point guard Michael Williams was on the injured reserve list due to a sore left heel injury, and missed the entire regular season.

== Regular season ==
=== Season standings ===
Midwest Division	W	L	PCT	GB	Home	Road	Div
y-Utah Jazz	64	18	.780	–	38–3	26–15	19–5
x-Houston Rockets	57	25	.695	7	30–11	27–14	19–5
x-Minnesota Timberwolves	40	42	.488	24	25–16	15–26	16–8
Dallas Mavericks	24	58	.293	40	14–27	10–31	9–15
Denver Nuggets	21	61	.256	43	12–29	9–32	7–17
San Antonio Spurs	20	62	.244	44	12–29	8–33	8–16
Vancouver Grizzlies	14	68	.171	50	8–33	6–35	6–18

1996–97 NBA West standings
#	Western Conference				
#	Team	W	L	PCT	GB
1	c-Utah Jazz	64	18	.780	–
2	y-Seattle SuperSonics	57	25	.695	7
3	x-Houston Rockets	57	25	.695	7
4	x-Los Angeles Lakers	56	26	.683	8
5	x-Portland Trail Blazers	49	33	.598	15
6	x-Minnesota Timberwolves	40	42	.488	24
7	x-Phoenix Suns	40	42	.488	24
8	x-Los Angeles Clippers	36	46	.439	28
9	Sacramento Kings	34	48	.415	30
10	Golden State Warriors	30	52	.366	34
11	Dallas Mavericks	24	58	.293	40
12	Denver Nuggets	21	61	.256	43
13	San Antonio Spurs	20	62	.244	44
14	Vancouver Grizzlies	14	68	.171	50

z – clinched division title
y – clinched division title
x – clinched playoff spot

== Playoffs ==
1997 playoff game log
First round: 0–3 (home: 0–1; road: 0–2)

Game	Date	Team	Score	High points	High rebounds	High assists	Location Attendance	Series
1	April 24	@ Houston	L 95–112	Stephon Marbury (28)	Kevin Garnett (9)	three players tied (4)	The Summit; 16,285	0–1
2	April 26	@ Houston	L 84–96	Stephon Marbury (22)	Dean Garrett (14)	Stephon Marbury (6)	The Summit; 16,285	0–2
3	April 29	Houston	L 120–125	Tom Gugliotta (27)	Dean Garrett (15)	Stephon Marbury (13)	Target Center; 19,006	0–3

1997 schedule

== Player statistics ==
=== Ragular season ===
Player	POS	GP	GS	MP	REB	AST	STL	BLK	PTS	MPG	RPG	APG	SPG	BPG	PPG
Terry Porter	PG	82	20	1,568	176	295	54	11	568	19.1	2.1	3.6	.7	.1	6.9
Sam Mitchell	SF	82	5	2,044	326	79	51	20	766	24.9	4.0	1.0	.6	.2	9.3
Tom Gugliotta	PF	81	81	3,131	702	335	130	89	1,672	38.7	8.7	4.1	1.6	1.1	20.6
Kevin Garnett	SF	77	77	2,995	618	236	105	163	1,309	38.9	8.0	3.1	1.4	2.1	17.0
Cherokee Parks	PF	76	0	961	195	34	41	48	252	12.6	2.6	.4	.5	.6	3.3
James Robinson	PG	69	5	1,309	112	126	30	8	572	19.0	1.6	1.8	.4	.1	8.3
Doug West	SG	68	66	1,920	148	113	61	24	531	28.2	2.2	1.7	.9	.4	7.8
Dean Garrett	C	68	47	1,665	495	38	40	95	542	24.5	7.3	.6	.6	1.4	8.0
Stephon Marbury	PG	67	64	2,324	184	522	67	19	1,057	34.7	2.7	7.8	1.0	.3	15.8
Chris Carr	SG	55	10	830	113	48	24	10	337	15.1	2.1	.9	.4	.2	6.1
Stojko Vranković	C	53	35	766	168	14	10	67	181	14.5	3.2	.3	.2	1.3	3.4
Shane Heal	PG	43	0	236	18	33	3	3	75	5.5	.4	.8	.1	.1	1.7
Reggie Jordan^{†}	SG	10	0	31	4	1	2	0	20	3.1	.4	.1	.2	.0	2.0

- ^{†} Denotes player spent time with another team in the season. Stats reflect time with the Timberwolves only.

=== Playoffs ===
Player	POS	GP	GS	MP	REB	AST	STL	BLK	PTS	MPG	RPG	APG	SPG	BPG	PPG
Kevin Garnett	SF	3	3	125	28	11	4	3	52	41.7	9.3	3.7	1.3	1.0	17.3
Tom Gugliotta	PF	3	3	121	16	13	7	2	55	40.3	5.3	4.3	2.3	.7	18.3
Dean Garrett	C	3	3	118	35	4	2	3	38	39.3	11.7	1.3	.7	1.0	12.7
Stephon Marbury	PG	3	3	117	12	23	2	0	64	39.0	4.0	7.7	.7	.0	21.3
Doug West	SG	3	3	87	4	6	2	1	33	29.0	1.3	2.0	.7	.3	11.0
Sam Mitchell	SF	3	0	47	7	1	1	1	17	15.7	2.3	.3	.3	.3	5.7
Terry Porter	PG	3	0	46	3	9	2	2	16	15.3	1.0	3.0	.7	.7	5.3
James Robinson	PG	2	0	31	3	3	2	0	14	15.5	1.5	1.5	1.0	.0	7.0
Shane Heal	PG	2	0	3	0	1	0	0	6	1.5	.0	.5	.0	.0	3.0
Cherokee Parks	PF	1	0	11	5	0	1	0	4	11.0	5.0	.0	1.0	.0	4.0
Chris Carr	SG	1	0	8	2	1	0	0	0	8.0	2.0	1.0	.0	.0	.0
Stojko Vranković	C	1	0	6	1	0	0	0	0	6.0	1.0	.0	.0	.0	.0

== Awards and records ==
- Kevin Garnett, NBA All-Star
- Tom Gugliotta, NBA All-Star
- Stephon Marbury, NBA All-Rookie Team 1st Team

== See also ==
- 1996–97 NBA season
