= 1996–97 San Antonio Spurs season =

- Head coach: Bob Hill (fired); Gregg Popovich
- President: Gregg Popovich (vice)
- General manager: Gregg Popovich
- Owner: Peter Holt
- Arena: Alamodome

Results
- Record: 20–62 (.244)
- Place: Division: 6th (Midwest); Conference: 13th (Western)
- Playoff finish: Did not qualify
- Stats at Basketball Reference

Local media
- Television: KSAT-TV; KRRT; Fox Sports Southwest
- Radio: WOAI

The 1996–97 San Antonio Spurs season was the 21st season for the San Antonio Spurs in the National Basketball Association, and their 30th season as a franchise.

== Season summary ==
=== Off-season ===
During the off-season, the Spurs signed free agent and former All-Star forward Dominique Wilkins, who previously played overseas in Greece last season, and re-signed former Spurs guard Vernon Maxwell, who won two NBA championships with the Houston Rockets.

=== Regular season ===
However, despite the addition of Wilkins and Maxwell, All-Star center David Robinson only played just six games due to back and foot injuries, while three-point specialist Chuck Person was out for the entire regular season due to an off-season back injury. The Spurs struggled losing 13 of their first 15 games of the season in November, which included an eight-game losing streak. After 18 games, head coach Bob Hill was fired and replaced with General Manager Gregg Popovich; Popovich would remain as head coach of the Spurs until 2025. The team dealt with additional injuries as Sean Elliott only played just 39 games due to a knee injury, and Charles D. Smith only appeared in just 19 games also with a knee injury. The Spurs held a 11–34 record at the All-Star break, and then later on lost their final six games of the season, finishing in sixth place in the Midwest Division with an awful 20–62 record; the team failed to qualify for the NBA playoffs for the first time since the 1988–89 season. The Spurs had the worst team defensive rating in the NBA.

Wilkins appeared in 63 games with the Spurs, averaging 18.2 points and 6.4 rebounds per game, while Robinson averaged 17.7 points and 8.5 rebounds per game during his short six-game stint, and Elliott averaged 14.9 points per game. In addition, Maxwell provided the team with 12.9 points per game and led them with 115 three-point field goals, while Vinny Del Negro contributed 12.3 points per game, and Avery Johnson provided with 10.5 points, 6.8 assists and 1.3 steals per game. Meanwhile, Monty Williams showed improvement averaging 9.0 points per game, while Will Perdue provided with 8.7 points, 9.8 rebounds and 1.6 blocks per game, Carl Herrera contributed 8.0 points and 4.5 rebounds per game, and Greg Anderson averaged 3.9 points and 5.5 rebounds per game.

Wilkins finished tied in seventh place in Sixth Man of the Year voting, while Williams finished tied in twelfth place in Most Improved Player voting. The Spurs finished eleventh in the NBA in home-game attendance, with an attendance of 706,641 at the Alamodome during the regular season.

=== Aftermath ===
Following the season, Wilkins left to play overseas in Italy, while Maxwell was released to free agency, Anderson re-signed as a free agent with the Atlanta Hawks, and Smith retired.

Since the Spurs joined the NBA in 1976, this was only the fourth time they missed the NBA playoffs. Until 2020, this was the Spurs' last season in which they failed to qualify for the playoffs, due in large part to turning the lottery pick they earned in 1997 into perennial All-Star Tim Duncan, who would create a dynasty that won them their first championship two years later, then four more championships in 2003, 2005, 2007, and 2014.

== Draft picks ==
The Spurs did not have any draft picks in 1996.

== Roster ==
1996–97 San Antonio Spurs roster
Players

| Pos. | No. | Player | Height | Weight | DOB | From |
|---|---|---|---|---|---|---|
| G | 1 | Cory Alexander | 6 ft 1 in (1.85 m) | 185 lb (84 kg) | –– | Virginia |
| C | 33 | Greg Anderson | 6 ft 10 in (2.08 m) | 230 lb (104 kg) | –– | Houston |
| G | 15 | Vinny Del Negro | 6 ft 4 in (1.93 m) | 185 lb (84 kg) | –– | NC State |
| F | 32 | Sean Elliott | 6 ft 8 in (2.03 m) | 205 lb (93 kg) | –– | Arizona |
| F | 14 | Jamie Feick | 6 ft 9 in (2.06 m) | 255 lb (116 kg) | –– | Michigan State |
| F | 7 | Carl Herrera | 6 ft 9 in (2.06 m) | 215 lb (98 kg) | –– | Houston |
| G | 6 | Avery Johnson | 5 ft 10 in (1.78 m) | 175 lb (79 kg) | –– | Southern |
| G | 11 | Vernon Maxwell | 6 ft 4 in (1.93 m) | 180 lb (82 kg) | –– | Florida |
| C | 41 | Will Perdue | 7 ft 0 in (2.13 m) | 240 lb (109 kg) | –– | Vanderbilt |
| F | 45 | Chuck Person | 6 ft 8 in (2.03 m) | 220 lb (100 kg) | –– | Auburn |
| C | 50 | David Robinson | 7 ft 1 in (2.16 m) | 235 lb (107 kg) | –– | Navy |
| F | 54 | Charles Smith | 6 ft 10 in (2.08 m) | 230 lb (104 kg) | –– | Pittsburgh |
| F | 21 | Dominique Wilkins | 6 ft 7 in (2.01 m) | 200 lb (91 kg) | –– | Georgia |
| F | 3 | Monty Williams | 6 ft 8 in (2.03 m) | 225 lb (102 kg) | –– | Notre Dame |

Coaches
Head coach
- Gregg Popovich
Assistant(s)
- Mike Budenholzer
- Hank Egan
- Paul Pressey

Legend
- (DP) Unsigned draft pick
- (FA) Free agent
- (S) Suspended
- (IN) Inactive
- Injured

Roster

=== Roster notes ===
- Small forward Chuck Person was on the injured reserve list due to a back injury, and missed the entire regular season.

== Regular season ==
The Spurs were trying to continue the success of the last two seasons which had records of 59-23 and 62-20 respectively. However they would finish a dismal 20–62, Scoring leader David Robinson was injured, and was only able to play just six games due to back and foot injuries. Also injured was forward and three-point specialist Chuck Person, who missed the entire season with an off-season back injury. Head coach Bob Hill was fired midway through the season after starting 3–15, being replaced by Gregg Popovich, who would finish 17–47. He would later be appointed head coach after the season's end. This would be the only losing season for Gregg Popovich and the first losing season for the Spurs since the 1988-89 NBA season. However the lone silver lining in this season would be winning the number one pick for the 1997 NBA draft.

=== Season standings ===
| Midwest Division | W | L | PCT | GB | Home | Road | Div |
|---|---|---|---|---|---|---|---|
| y-Utah Jazz | 64 | 18 | .780 | – | 38–3 | 26–15 | 19–5 |
| x-Houston Rockets | 57 | 25 | .695 | 7 | 30–11 | 27–14 | 19–5 |
| x-Minnesota Timberwolves | 40 | 42 | .488 | 24 | 25–16 | 15–26 | 16–8 |
| Dallas Mavericks | 24 | 58 | .293 | 40 | 14–27 | 10–31 | 9–15 |
| Denver Nuggets | 21 | 61 | .256 | 43 | 12–29 | 9–32 | 7–17 |
| San Antonio Spurs | 20 | 62 | .244 | 44 | 12–29 | 8–33 | 8–16 |
| Vancouver Grizzlies | 14 | 68 | .171 | 50 | 8–33 | 6–35 | 6–18 |

1996–97 NBA West standings
| # | Western Conference | | | | |
| # | Team | W | L | PCT | GB |
|---|---|---|---|---|---|
| 1 | c-Utah Jazz | 64 | 18 | .780 | – |
| 2 | y-Seattle SuperSonics | 57 | 25 | .695 | 7 |
| 3 | x-Houston Rockets | 57 | 25 | .695 | 7 |
| 4 | x-Los Angeles Lakers | 56 | 26 | .683 | 8 |
| 5 | x-Portland Trail Blazers | 49 | 33 | .598 | 15 |
| 6 | x-Minnesota Timberwolves | 40 | 42 | .488 | 24 |
| 7 | x-Phoenix Suns | 40 | 42 | .488 | 24 |
| 8 | x-Los Angeles Clippers | 36 | 46 | .439 | 28 |
| 9 | Sacramento Kings | 34 | 48 | .415 | 30 |
| 10 | Golden State Warriors | 30 | 52 | .366 | 34 |
| 11 | Dallas Mavericks | 24 | 58 | .293 | 40 |
| 12 | Denver Nuggets | 21 | 61 | .256 | 43 |
| 13 | San Antonio Spurs | 20 | 62 | .244 | 44 |
| 14 | Vancouver Grizzlies | 14 | 68 | .171 | 50 |

z - clinched division title
y - clinched division title
x - clinched playoff spot

== Player statistics ==
=== Ragular season ===
| Player | POS | GP | GS | MP | REB | AST | STL | BLK | PTS | MPG | RPG | APG | SPG | BPG | PPG |
|---|---|---|---|---|---|---|---|---|---|---|---|---|---|---|---|
| Cadillac Anderson | C | 82 | 48 | 1,659 | 448 | 34 | 63 | 67 | 322 | 20.2 | 5.5 | .4 | .8 | .8 | 3.9 |
| Cory Alexander | PG | 80 | 6 | 1,454 | 123 | 254 | 82 | 16 | 577 | 18.2 | 1.5 | 3.2 | 1.0 | .2 | 7.2 |
| Avery Johnson | PG | 76 | 76 | 2,472 | 147 | 513 | 96 | 15 | 800 | 32.5 | 1.9 | 6.8 | 1.3 | .2 | 10.5 |
| Carl Herrera | PF | 75 | 58 | 1,837 | 340 | 50 | 62 | 53 | 597 | 24.5 | 4.5 | .7 | .8 | .7 | 8.0 |
| Vinny Del Negro | SG | 72 | 53 | 2,243 | 210 | 231 | 59 | 7 | 886 | 31.2 | 2.9 | 3.2 | .8 | .1 | 12.3 |
| Vernon Maxwell | SG | 72 | 31 | 2,068 | 159 | 153 | 87 | 19 | 929 | 28.7 | 2.2 | 2.1 | 1.2 | .3 | 12.9 |
| Will Perdue | C | 65 | 34 | 1,918 | 638 | 38 | 32 | 102 | 565 | 29.5 | 9.8 | .6 | .5 | 1.6 | 8.7 |
| Monty Williams | SF | 65 | 26 | 1,345 | 206 | 91 | 55 | 52 | 588 | 20.7 | 3.2 | 1.4 | .8 | .8 | 9.0 |
| Dominique Wilkins | SF | 63 | 26 | 1,945 | 402 | 119 | 39 | 31 | 1,145 | 30.9 | 6.4 | 1.9 | .6 | .5 | 18.2 |
| Sean Elliott | SF | 39 | 39 | 1,393 | 190 | 124 | 24 | 24 | 582 | 35.7 | 4.9 | 3.2 | .6 | .6 | 14.9 |
| Jamie Feick^{†} | PF | 38 | 0 | 614 | 211 | 26 | 16 | 13 | 146 | 16.2 | 5.6 | .7 | .4 | .3 | 3.8 |
| Charles Smith | PF | 19 | 7 | 329 | 65 | 14 | 13 | 22 | 88 | 17.3 | 3.4 | .7 | .7 | 1.2 | 4.6 |
| Tim Kempton | PF | 10 | 0 | 59 | 8 | 2 | 1 | 1 | 4 | 5.9 | .8 | .2 | .1 | .1 | .4 |
| Stephen Howard^{†} | SF | 7 | 0 | 69 | 9 | 1 | 8 | 2 | 26 | 9.9 | 1.3 | .1 | 1.1 | .3 | 3.7 |
| David Robinson | C | 6 | 6 | 147 | 51 | 8 | 6 | 6 | 106 | 24.5 | 8.5 | 1.3 | 1.0 | 1.0 | 17.7 |
| Jason Sasser^{†} | SF | 6 | 0 | 62 | 7 | 1 | 2 | 0 | 17 | 10.3 | 1.2 | .2 | .3 | .0 | 2.8 |
| Joe Courtney^{†} | PF | 5 | 0 | 48 | 7 | 0 | 0 | 0 | 13 | 9.6 | 1.4 | .0 | .0 | .0 | 2.6 |
| Gaylon Nickerson^{†} | SG | 3 | 0 | 36 | 4 | 1 | 0 | 1 | 13 | 12.0 | 1.3 | .3 | .0 | .3 | 4.3 |
| Devin Gray^{†} | PF | 3 | 0 | 24 | 5 | 0 | 1 | 0 | 10 | 8.0 | 1.7 | .0 | .3 | .0 | 3.3 |
| Darrin Hancock^{†} | SF | 1 | 0 | 8 | 0 | 1 | 0 | 0 | 4 | 8.0 | .0 | 1.0 | .0 | .0 | 4.0 |

- ^{†} Denotes player spent time with another team in the season. Stats reflect time with the Spurs only.

== See also ==
- 1996-97 NBA season
