= 1996–97 Denver Nuggets season =

NBA professional basketball team season

- Head coach: Bernie Bickerstaff (resigned); Dick Motta
- President: Bernie Bickerstaff
- General manager: Bernie Bickerstaff; Allan Bristow
- Arena: McNichols Sports Arena

Results
- Record: 21–61 (.256)
- Place: Division: 5th (Midwest); Conference: 12th (Western)
- Playoff finish: Did not qualify
- Stats at Basketball Reference

Local media
- Television: KWGN-TV; Fox Sports Rocky Mountain
- Radio: KKFN

The 1996–97 Denver Nuggets season was the 21st season for the Denver Nuggets in the National Basketball Association, and their 30th season as a franchise.

== Season summary ==
=== Off-season ===
During the off-season, the Nuggets acquired Mark Jackson and Ricky Pierce from the Indiana Pacers, acquired Šarūnas Marčiulionis from the Sacramento Kings, and signed free agents Ervin Johnson, Eric Murdock, and undrafted rookie power forward Darvin Ham; Murdock was later on released to free agency in November after just 12 games. Early into the regular season, the Nuggets signed Brooks Thompson, who was previously released by the Utah Jazz.

=== Regular season ===
With the addition of Jackson, Johnson and Pierce, the Nuggets lost 9 of their first 13 games of the regular season. After 13 games, Bernie Bickerstaff resigned as head coach and was replaced with Dick Motta. The Nuggets then posted a 10-game losing streak, and later on held a 16–32 record at the All-Star break. At mid-season, the team traded Jackson and Ham to the Indiana Pacers, whom Jackson had previously played for, while Pierce was traded to the Charlotte Hornets in exchange for second-year guard Anthony Goldwire, and second-year center George Zidek. The team also signed free agent and three-point specialist Kenny Smith, who won two NBA championships with the Houston Rockets. The Nuggets struggled losing 26 of their final 30 games of the season, and finished in fifth place in the Midwest Division with a 21–61 record.

LaPhonso Ellis had a stellar season, averaging 21.9 points and 7.0 rebounds per game, but only played 55 games due to knee injuries and a ruptured Achilles tendon, while second-year star Antonio McDyess averaged 18.3 points, 7.3 rebounds and 1.7 blocks per game, and Dale Ellis provided the team with 16.6 points per game, and led them with 192 three-point field goals. In addition, Bryant Stith contributed 14.9 points per game, but only played 52 games due to a foot injury, while Smith provided with 7.9 points and 3.1 assists per game in 33 games, and Goldwire contributed 7.3 points and 4.6 assists per game in 27 games after the trade. Meanwhile, Johnson averaged 7.1 points, 11.1 rebounds and 2.8 blocks per game, Thompson contributed 6.8 points and 2.8 assists per game, and Tom Hammonds provided with 6.2 points and 5.0 rebounds per game.

During the NBA All-Star weekend at the Gund Arena in Cleveland, Ohio, Dale Ellis participated in the NBA Three-Point Shootout, while before the mid-season trade, Ham participated in the NBA Slam Dunk Contest. LaPhonso Ellis finished tied in ninth place in Most Improved Player voting. The Nuggets finished 28th in the NBA in home-game attendance, with an attendance of 340,486 at the McNichols Sports Arena during the regular season, which was the second-lowest in the league.

=== Notable highlights ===
On April 16, 1997, the Nuggets suffered a 44-point margin road loss to the Portland Trail Blazers, 107–63 at the Rose Garden Arena. The Trail Blazers held the Nuggets to only just eight points in the first quarter, and later on held a 53–22 lead at halftime; the Nuggets struggled only shooting just .284 in field-goal percentage.

=== Aftermath ===
Following the season, McDyess was traded to the Phoenix Suns in a three-team trade, while Dale Ellis was traded back to his former team, the Seattle SuperSonics, and Johnson was dealt to the Milwaukee Bucks on draft day. Meanwhile, Hammonds signed as a free agent with the Minnesota Timberwolves during the next season, Smith and Marčiulionis both retired, Thompson was released to free agency, and Motta was fired as head coach.

== Draft picks ==
Round	Pick	Player	Position	Nationality	School/Club team
1	23	Efthimios Rentzias	C	Greece	PAOK
2	37	Jeff McInnis	PG/SG	United States	North Carolina

== Roster ==
1996–97 Denver Nuggets roster
Players

Pos.	No.	Player	Height	Weight	DOB	From
G	53	Jerome Allen	6 ft 4 in (1.93 m)	184 lb (83 kg)	1973–01–28	Penn
G	17	Vincent Askew	6 ft 6 in (1.98 m)	210 lb (95 kg)	1966–02–28	Memphis
F	3	Dale Ellis	6 ft 7 in (2.01 m)	205 lb (93 kg)	1960–08–06	Tennessee
F	20	LaPhonso Ellis (injured)	6 ft 8 in (2.03 m)	240 lb (109 kg)	1970–05–05	Notre Dame
G	5	Anthony Goldwire	6 ft 1 in (1.85 m)	182 lb (83 kg)	1971–09–06	Houston
F	21	Tom Hammonds	6 ft 9 in (2.06 m)	215 lb (98 kg)	1967–03–27	Georgia Tech
C	50	Ervin Johnson	6 ft 11 in (2.11 m)	245 lb (111 kg)	1967–12–21	LSU New Orleans
G	13	Jimmy King	6 ft 5 in (1.96 m)	210 lb (95 kg)	1973–08–09	Michigan
G	8	Šarūnas Marčiulionis (injured)	6 ft 5 in (1.96 m)	200 lb (91 kg)	1964–06–13	Lithuania
F	24	Antonio McDyess	6 ft 9 in (2.06 m)	220 lb (100 kg)	1974–09–07	Alabama
G	30	Kenny Smith	6 ft 3 in (1.91 m)	170 lb (77 kg)	1965–03–08	North Carolina
G	23	Bryant Stith	6 ft 5 in (1.96 m)	208 lb (94 kg)	1970–12–10	Virginia
G	6	Brooks Thompson	6 ft 4 in (1.93 m)	193 lb (88 kg)	1970–07–19	Oklahoma State
C	25	George Zidek	7 ft 0 in (2.13 m)	250 lb (113 kg)	1973–08–02	UCLA

Coaches
Head coach
- Bernie Bickerstaff (resigned)
- Dick Motta
Assistant(s)
- Jim Brovelli
- Gene Littles

Legend
- (DP) Unsigned draft pick
- (FA) Free agent
- (S) Suspended
- Injured

Roster
Updated: April 6, 1997

=== Roster Notes ===
- Point guard Eric Murdock was waived on November 26, 1996.

== Regular season ==
=== Season standings ===
Midwest Division	W	L	PCT	GB	Home	Road	Div
y-Utah Jazz	64	18	.780	–	38–3	26–15	19–5
x-Houston Rockets	57	25	.695	7	30–11	27–14	19–5
x-Minnesota Timberwolves	40	42	.488	24	25–16	15–26	16–8
Dallas Mavericks	24	58	.293	40	14–27	10–31	9–15
Denver Nuggets	21	61	.256	43	12–29	9–32	7–17
San Antonio Spurs	20	62	.244	44	12–29	8–33	8–16
Vancouver Grizzlies	14	68	.171	50	8–33	6–35	6–18

1996–97 NBA West standings
#	Western Conference				
#	Team	W	L	PCT	GB
1	c-Utah Jazz	64	18	.780	–
2	y-Seattle SuperSonics	57	25	.695	7
3	x-Houston Rockets	57	25	.695	7
4	x-Los Angeles Lakers	56	26	.683	8
5	x-Portland Trail Blazers	49	33	.598	15
6	x-Minnesota Timberwolves	40	42	.488	24
7	x-Phoenix Suns	40	42	.488	24
8	x-Los Angeles Clippers	36	46	.439	28
9	Sacramento Kings	34	48	.415	30
10	Golden State Warriors	30	52	.366	34
11	Dallas Mavericks	24	58	.293	40
12	Denver Nuggets	21	61	.256	43
13	San Antonio Spurs	20	62	.244	44
14	Vancouver Grizzlies	14	68	.171	50

z - clinched division title
y - clinched division title
x - clinched playoff spot

== Player statistics ==
Legend
GP	Games played	GS	Games started	MPG	Minutes per game
FG%	Field-goal percentage	3P%	3-point field-goal percentage	FT%	Free-throw percentage
RPG	Rebounds per game	APG	Assists per game	SPG	Steals per game
BPG	Blocks per game	PPG	Points per game

=== Regular season ===
Player	GP	GS	MPG	FG%	3FG%	FT%	RPG	APG	SPG	BPG	PPG
LaPhonso Ellis	55	49	36.4	.439	.367	.773	7.0	2.4	0.8	0.7	21.9
Antonio McDyess	74	73	34.7	.463	.171	.708	7.3	1.4	0.8	1.7	18.3
Dale Ellis	82	51	35.9	.414	.364	.817	3.6	2.0	0.7	0.1	16.6
Bryant Stith	52	52	34.4	.416	.385	.863	4.2	2.6	1.2	0.4	14.9
Mark Jackson	52	52	38.5	.425	.397	.801	5.2	12.3	1.0	0.2	10.4
Ricky Pierce	33	10	18.2	.462	.308	.902	1.6	0.9	0.4	0.2	10.2
Kenny Smith	33	3	19.8	.422	.425	.854	1.1	3.1	0.5	0.0	7.9
Anthony Goldwire	27	21	22.7	.392	.394	.816	1.7	4.6	0.5	0.0	7.3
Ervin Johnson	82	82	31.7	.520	.000	.615	11.1	0.9	0.8	2.8	7.1
Brooks Thompson	65	6	16.1	.400	.398	.632	1.5	2.8	0.8	0.0	6.8
Sarunas Marciulionis	17	0	15.0	.376	.367	.806	1.8	1.5	0.7	0.1	6.8
Tom Hammonds	81	8	21.7	.480	.000	.721	5.0	0.8	0.2	0.3	6.2
Aaron Williams	1	0	10.0	.600			5.0	0.0	0.0	3.0	6.0
Vincent Askew	1	0	9.0	.667		1.000	0.0	0.0	0.0	0.0	6.0
Jeff McInnis	13	0	9.0	.469	.462	.700	0.5	1.4	0.2	0.1	5.0
Eric Murdock	12	0	9.5	.455	.400	.917	0.9	2.0	0.8	0.2	3.8
George Zidek	16	0	5.5	.485		.800	1.4	0.3	0.1	0.0	3.3
Jimmy King	2	0	11.0	.333		.500	1.0	1.0	1.5	0.0	3.0
Jerome Allen	25	0	10.0	.284	.206	.600	1.3	1.7	0.2	0.2	2.6
Elmer Bennett	5	0	11.8	.308	.333	.500	0.6	1.4	0.4	0.0	2.4
Darvin Ham	35	3	8.9	.525		.485	1.6	0.4	0.2	0.2	2.3
Melvin Booker	5	0	4.2	.500	.500		0.2	0.6	0.0	0.0	1.0
LaSalle Thompson	17	0	6.2	.188		.500	1.5	0.0	0.2	0.4	0.4

Player statistics citation:

== See also ==
- 1996-97 NBA season
