= 1996–97 Golden State Warriors season =

NBA professional basketball team season

- Head coach: Rick Adelman
- Owners: Chris Cohan
- Arena: San Jose Arena

Results
- Record: 30–52 (.366)
- Place: Division: 7th (Pacific); Conference: 10th (Western)
- Playoff finish: Did not qualify
- Stats at Basketball Reference

Local media
- Television: KPIX/KICU-TV; SportsChannel Pacific
- Radio: KNBR

The 1996–97 Golden State Warriors season was the 51st season for the Golden State Warriors in the National Basketball Association, and their 35th season in the San Francisco Bay Area.

== Season summary ==
=== Off-season ===
The Warriors received the eleventh overall pick in the 1996 NBA draft, and selected center Todd Fuller out of North Carolina State University. Due to extensive renovations at the Oakland-Alameda County Coliseum Arena, the team played their home games at the San Jose Arena in San Jose, California this season. During the off-season, the Warriors signed free agent All-Star guard Mark Price, then traded Rony Seikaly to the Orlando Magic in exchange for Felton Spencer, Donald Royal and Jon Koncak at the start of the regular season. However, Koncak was out for the entire season due to a knee injury, and never played for the Warriors.

=== Regular season ===
With the addition of Price and Spencer, the Warriors struggled losing 10 of their first 13 games of the regular season, and later on held a 17–29 record at the All-Star break. At mid-season, the team traded Royal to the Charlotte Hornets in exchange for Scott Burrell. The Warriors posted a seven-game losing streak in March, as B. J. Armstrong only played just 49 games due to a knee injury, and Bimbo Coles only appeared in 51 games due to a hernia injury. The Warriors lost six of their final eight games of the season, and finished in last place in the Pacific Division with a 30–52 record.

Latrell Sprewell averaged 24.2 points, 6.3 assists and 1.7 steals per game, and led the Warriors with 147 three-point field goals, while second-year star Joe Smith continued to show improvement, averaging 18.7 points and 8.5 rebounds per game, and Chris Mullin provided the team with 14.5 points, 4.1 assists and 1.6 steals per game. In addition, Price contributed 11.3 points and 4.9 assists per game, along with 112 three-point field goals, while Armstrong contributed 7.9 points and 2.6 assists per game, and Donyell Marshall provided with 7.3 points and 4.5 rebounds per game. Meanwhile, Coles contributed 6.1 points and 2.9 assists per game, second-year center Andrew DeClercq averaged 5.3 points and 4.2 rebounds per game, Spencer averaged 5.1 points and 5.7 rebounds per game, Burrell contributed 4.9 points per game in 29 games after the trade, and Fuller provided with 4.1 points and 3.3 rebounds per game.

During the NBA All-Star weekend at the Gund Arena in Cleveland, Ohio, Sprewell was selected for the 1997 NBA All-Star Game, as a member of the Western Conference All-Star team. Off the bench, Sprewell scored 19 points along with 2 steals, despite the Western Conference losing to the Eastern Conference, 132–120. The Warriors finished 23rd in the NBA in home-game attendance, with an attendance of 621,844 at the San Jose Arena during the regular season.

=== Aftermath ===
This season marked an end of an era, as Mullin was traded to the Indiana Pacers the following season; although he would later on return to Golden State for the 2000–01 season. Meanwhile, Price was traded to the Orlando Magic, Burrell was dealt to the Chicago Bulls, DeClercq signed as a free agent with the Boston Celtics, head coach Rick Adelman was fired after two seasons with the Warriors, and Koncak retired.

== Offseason ==
=== Draft picks ===
Round	Pick	Player	Position	Nationality	College
1	11	Todd Fuller	C	United States	North Carolina State
2	40	Marcus Mann	PF	United States	Mississippi Valley State

== Roster ==
1996–97 Golden State Warriors roster
Players

Pos.	No.	Player	Height	Weight	DOB	From
G	11	B. J. Armstrong (injured)	6 ft 2 in (1.88 m)	175 lb (79 kg)	1967–09–09	Iowa
G	5	Melvin Booker	6 ft 2 in (1.88 m)	185 lb (84 kg)	1972–08–20	Missouri
F	23	Scott Burrell	6 ft 7 in (2.01 m)	218 lb (99 kg)	1971–01–12	Connecticut
G	12	Bimbo Coles (injured)	6 ft 1 in (1.85 m)	180 lb (82 kg)	1968–04–22	Virginia Tech
C	55	Andrew DeClercq	6 ft 10 in (2.08 m)	230 lb (104 kg)	1973–02–01	Florida
C	52	Todd Fuller	6 ft 11 in (2.11 m)	255 lb (116 kg)	1974–07–25	NC State
C	45	Jon Koncak (injured) (IN)	7 ft 0 in (2.13 m)	235 lb (107 kg)	1963–05–17	SMU
F	3	Donyell Marshall	6 ft 9 in (2.06 m)	218 lb (99 kg)	1973–05–18	Connecticut
F	17	Chris Mullin	6 ft 6 in (1.98 m)	200 lb (91 kg)	1963–07–30	St. John's
F	35	Ray Owes	6 ft 9 in (2.06 m)	224 lb (102 kg)	1972–11–30	Arizona
C	51	Mike Peplowski (injured) (IN)	6 ft 10 in (2.08 m)	270 lb (122 kg)	1970–10–15	Michigan State
G	25	Mark Price	6 ft 0 in (1.83 m)	170 lb (77 kg)	1964–02–15	Georgia Tech
F	21	Lou Roe	6 ft 7 in (2.01 m)	220 lb (100 kg)	1972–07–14	UMass
F	32	Joe Smith	6 ft 10 in (2.08 m)	225 lb (102 kg)	1975–07–26	Maryland
C	50	Felton Spencer	7 ft 0 in (2.13 m)	265 lb (120 kg)	1968–02–15	Louisville
G	15	Latrell Sprewell	6 ft 5 in (1.96 m)	190 lb (86 kg)	1970–09–08	Alabama

Coaches
Head coach
- Rick Adelman
Assistant(s)
- George Irvine
- Rod Higgins
- John Wetzel

Legend
- (DP) Unsigned draft pick
- (FA) Free agent
- (S) Suspended
- (IN) Inactive
- Injured

Roster

=== Roster Notes ===
- Center Jon Koncak was acquired by the Warriors from the Orlando Magic in an early-season trade, but was placed on the injured reserve list due to a knee injury, missed the entire regular season, and never played for the Warriors.
- Center Mike Peplowski was on the injured reserve list due to a torn knee ligament sustained during the preseason, and missed the entire regular season.

== Regular season ==
=== Season standings ===
Pacific Division	W	L	PCT	GB	Home	Road	Div
y-Seattle SuperSonics	57	25	.695	–	31–10	26–15	16–8
x-Los Angeles Lakers	56	26	.683	1	31–10	25–16	18–6
x-Portland Trail Blazers	49	33	.598	8	29–12	20–21	15–9
x-Phoenix Suns	40	42	.488	17	25–16	15–26	13–11
x-Los Angeles Clippers	36	46	.439	21	21–20	15–26	10–14
Sacramento Kings	34	48	.415	23	22–19	12–29	8–16
Golden State Warriors	30	52	.366	27	18–23	12–29	4–20

1996–97 NBA West standings
#	Western Conference				
#	Team	W	L	PCT	GB
1	c-Utah Jazz	64	18	.780	–
2	y-Seattle SuperSonics	57	25	.695	7
3	x-Houston Rockets	57	25	.695	7
4	x-Los Angeles Lakers	56	26	.683	8
5	x-Portland Trail Blazers	49	33	.598	15
6	x-Minnesota Timberwolves	40	42	.488	24
7	x-Phoenix Suns	40	42	.488	24
8	x-Los Angeles Clippers	36	46	.439	28
9	Sacramento Kings	34	48	.415	30
10	Golden State Warriors	30	52	.366	34
11	Dallas Mavericks	24	58	.293	40
12	Denver Nuggets	21	61	.256	43
13	San Antonio Spurs	20	62	.244	44
14	Vancouver Grizzlies	14	68	.171	50

z - clinched division title
y - clinched division title
x - clinched playoff spot

=== Game log ===
1996–97 game log
Total: 67–15 (Home: 39–2; Road: 28–13)
November: 4–11 (home: 2–6; road: 2–5)

Game	Date	Team	Score	High points	High rebounds	High assists	Location Attendance	Record
1	November 1	L.A. Clippers	L 85–97				San Jose Arena; 15,593	0–1
3	November 3	@ Vancouver	W 105–95				General Motors Place; 15,781	1–1
4	November 5	Portland	L 93–111				San Jose Arena; 13,458	1–2
5	November 7	New York	L 100–105				San Jose Arena; 16,639	1–3
6	November 8	@ Denver	L 91–94				McNichols Sports Arena; 10,302	1–4
7	November 12	@ Seattle	L 102–121				KeyArena at Seattle Center; 17,072	1–5
8	November 13	Milwaukee	W 95–86				San Jose Arena; 14,414	2–5
9	November 16	@ Houston	L 103–115				The Summit; 16,285	2–6
10	November 17	@ San Antonio	W 102–92				Alamodome; 13,334	3–6
11	November 19	Los Angeles Lakers	L 109–112				San Jose Arena; 18,742	3-7
12	November 21	@ Utah	L 104–109				Delta Center; 18,889	3–8
13	November 23	Houston	L 115–120				San Jose Arena; 16,896	3–9
14	November 26	Miami	L 88–107				San Jose Arena; 15,026	3–10
15	November 28	New Jersey	W 124–118				San Jose Arena; 15,209	4–10
16	November 29	@ Portland	L 93–119				Rose Garden Arena; 21,068	4–11

1996–97 schedule

== Player statistics ==
Legend
GP	Games played	GS	Games started	MPG	Minutes per game
FG%	Field-goal percentage	3P%	3-point field-goal percentage	FT%	Free-throw percentage
RPG	Rebounds per game	APG	Assists per game	SPG	Steals per game
BPG	Blocks per game	PPG	Points per game

=== Regular season ===
Player	GP	GS	MPG	FG%	3P%	FT%	RPG	APG	SPG	BPG	PPG
Joe Smith	80	80	38.6	.454	.261	.814	8.5	1.6	.9	1.1	18.7
Latrell Sprewell	80	79	41.9	.449	.354	.843	4.6	6.3	1.7	.6	24.2
Chris Mullin	79	63	34.6	.553	.411	.864	4.0	4.1	1.6	.4	14.5
Todd Fuller	75	18	12.7	.429		.691	3.3	.3	.1	.3	4.1
Felton Spencer^{†}	72	64	21.4	.486		.584	5.7	.3	.5	.7	5.1
Andrew DeClercq	71	1	15.0	.520		.603	4.2	.5	.5	.4	5.3
Mark Price	70	49	26.8	.447	.396	.906	2.6	4.9	1.0	.0	11.3
Donyell Marshall	61	20	16.8	.413	.315	.622	4.5	.9	.4	.8	7.3
Ray Owes	57	1	10.4	.417	.200	.565	2.9	.3	.3	.4	3.1
Bimbo Coles	51	13	23.2	.389	.294	.755	2.3	2.9	.7	.1	6.1
B. J. Armstrong	49	17	20.8	.453	.278	.861	1.5	2.6	.5	.0	7.9
Donald Royal^{†}	36	1	14.1	.385	.000	.795	2.6	.4	.3	.3	3.8
Scott Burrell^{†}	29	0	15.8	.379	.361	.652	2.7	1.2	.5	.3	4.9
Lou Roe	17	0	6.3	.292	.273	.474	.8	.4	.2	.1	2.4
Melvin Booker^{†}	16	4	25.6	.436	.314	.900	1.8	3.1	.2	.1	7.3
Clifford Rozier^{†}	1	0	5.0	.000			.0	.0	.0	.0	.0

- ^{†} Denotes player spent time with another team in the season. Stats reflect time with the Warriors only.

Player statistics citation:

== Transactions ==
=== Trades ===
November 2, 1996	To Golden State Warriors Jon Koncak; Donald Royal; Felton Spencer	To Orlando Magic Clifford Rozier; Rony Seikaly; 1999 second-round pick

February 20, 1997	To Golden State Warriors Scott Burrell	To Charlotte Hornets Donald Royal

=== Free agents ===
Additions
Player	Date signed	Former team
Mark Price	July 21	Washington Bullets
Ray Owes	September 30	Geelong Supercats (Australia)
Henry James	September 30	Houston Rockets
Lou Roe	September 30	Detroit Pistons
Melvin Booker (10-day)	March 19	Grand Rapids Hoops (CBA)
Melvin Booker (rest of season)	April 9	Golden State Warriors

Subtractions
Player	Date signed	New Team
Robert Churchwell	July 21	La Crosse Bobcats (CBA)
Geert Hammink	July 21	Panionios (Greece)
Jerome Kersey	July 21	Los Angeles Lakers
Jon Barry	July 21	Atlanta Hawks
Kevin Willis	July 21	Houston Rockets
Henry James	October 27	Atlanta Hawks

Player transactions citation:

== See also ==
- 1996-97 NBA season
