= Mitchell Butler =

American basketball player and sports agent (born 1970)

Personal information
- Born: December 15, 1970 (age 55) Los Angeles, California, U.S.
- Listed height: 6 ft 5 in (1.96 m)
- Listed weight: 210 lb (95 kg)

Career information
- High school: Oakwood (Los Angeles, California)
- College: UCLA (1989–1993)
- NBA draft: 1993: undrafted
- Playing career: 1993–2004
- Position: Shooting guard
- Number: 32, 6, 23

Career history
- 1993–1996: Washington Bullets
- 1996–1997: Portland Trail Blazers
- 1997–1999: Cleveland Cavaliers
- 2000: Žalgiris Kaunas
- 2000–2001: San Diego Wildfire
- 2001–2002: Portland Trail Blazers
- 2002–2003: Yakima Sun Kings
- 2003–2004: Washington Wizards

Career highlights
- CBA champion (2003); Third-team Parade All-American (1989); McDonald's All-American (1989)

Career NBA statistics
- Points: 1,868 (5.3 ppg)
- Rebounds: 717 (2.0 rpg)
- Assists: 342 (0.9 apg)
- Stats at NBA.com
- Stats at Basketball Reference

Mitchell Leon Butler (born December 15, 1970) is an American sports agent and former professional basketball player. He played in the National Basketball Association (NBA) from 1993 to 2004.

The 6-foot-5-inch (1.96 m) shooting guard signed undrafted with the Washington Bullets in 1993 after a collegiate career at UCLA in which he played in more career games than any other Bruin and swiped the seventh-most steals in UCLA history. After three seasons in Washington, Butler was traded to the Portland Trail Blazers along with Rasheed Wallace in exchange for Rod Strickland and Harvey Grant. Following his stint playing for the Blazers, he signed as a free agent with the Cleveland Cavaliers. Following the 1999 season, Butler did not play in the NBA for two years. In 2001–02, Butler signed with the Trail Blazers, marking his second stint with the franchise. Mitchell's last year in the league was in the 2003–04 season, when he once again played for the D.C. franchise, now renamed the Washington Wizards. Butler played in a total of 362 NBA games with 33 starts. He owns career averages of 5.2 points, 2 rebounds, and 1 assist.

Butler appeared in the 1994 movie Blue Chips.

Butler worked as NBA sports agent with Lagardère Unlimited before joining Rival Sports Group as president of basketball.
