= List of NBA career playoff steals leaders =

This article provides two lists:

A list of National Basketball Association players by total career Playoffs steals recorded.

A progressive list of steals leaders showing how the record increased through the years.

== Playoff steals leaders ==
This is a list of National Basketball Association players by total career Playoffs steals recorded.

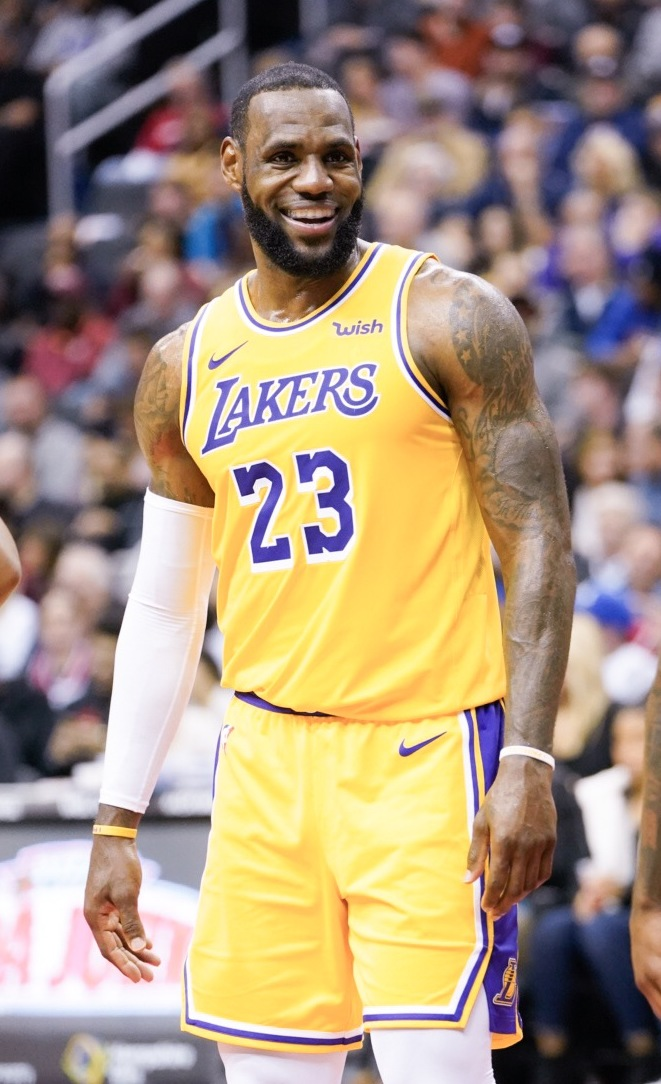
LeBron James has the most steals in NBA playoffs history.

Statistics accurate as of the 2026 NBA playoffs.

| ^ | Active NBA player |
| * | Inducted into a Naismith Memorial Basketball Hall of Fame |

| Rank | Player | Position(s) | Playoff team(s) played for (years) | Total steals | Games played | Steals per game average |
|---|---|---|---|---|---|---|
| 1 | LeBron James^ | SF | Cleveland Cavaliers (2006–2010, 2015–2018); Miami Heat (2011–2014); Los Angeles Lakers (2020–2021, 2023–2026) | 506 | 302 | 1.68 |
| 2 | Scottie Pippen* | SF | Chicago Bulls (1988–1998); Houston Rockets (1999); Portland Trail Blazers (2000–2003) | 395 | 208 | 1.90 |
| 3 | Michael Jordan* | SG | Chicago Bulls (1985–1993, 1995–1998) | 376 | 179 | 2.10 |
| 4 | Magic Johnson* | PG | Los Angeles Lakers (1980–1991, 1996) | 358 | 190 | 1.88 |
| 5 | John Stockton* | PG | Utah Jazz (1985–2003) | 338 | 182 | 1.86 |
| 6 | James Harden^ | SG/PG | Oklahoma City Thunder (2010–2012); Houston Rockets (2013–2020); Brooklyn Nets (2021); Philadelphia 76ers (2022–2023); Los Angeles Clippers (2024–2025); Cleveland Cavaliers (2026) | 313 | 191 | 1.64 |
| 7 | Kobe Bryant* | SG | Los Angeles Lakers (1997–2004, 2006–2012) | 310 | 220 | 1.41 |
| 8 | Jason Kidd* | PG | Phoenix Suns (1997–2001); New Jersey Nets (2002–2007); Dallas Mavericks (2008–2012); New York Knicks (2013) | 302 | 158 | 1.91 |
| 9 | Larry Bird* | SF/PF | Boston Celtics (1980–1988, 1990–1992) | 296 | 164 | 1.80 |
| 10 | Maurice Cheeks* | PG | Philadelphia 76ers (1979–1987, 1989); New York Knicks (1990–1991); New Jersey Nets (1993) | 295 | 133 | 2.22 |
| 11 | Manu Ginóbili* | SG | San Antonio Spurs (2003–2008, 2010–2018) | 292 | 218 | 1.34 |
| 12 | Chris Paul^{†} | PG | New Orleans Hornets (2008–2009, 2011); Los Angeles Clippers (2012–2017); Houston Rockets (2018–2019); Oklahoma City Thunder (2020); Phoenix Suns (2021–2023) | 287 | 149 | 1.93 |
| 13 | Clyde Drexler* | SG | Portland Trail Blazers (1984–1994); Houston Rockets (1995–1998) | 278 | 145 | 1.92 |
| 14 | Robert Horry | PF/SF | Houston Rockets (1993–1996); Los Angeles Lakers (1997–2003); San Antonio Spurs (2004–2008) | 276 | 244 | 1.13 |
| 15 | Dwyane Wade* | SG | Miami Heat (2004–2007, 2009–2014, 2016, 2018); Chicago Bulls (2017) | 273 | 177 | 1.54 |
| 16 | Derek Fisher | PG | Los Angeles Lakers (1997–2004, 2008–2011); Utah Jazz (2007); Oklahoma City Thunder (2012–2014) | 272 | 259 | 1.05 |
| 17 | Karl Malone* | PF | Utah Jazz (1986–2003); Los Angeles Lakers (2004) | 258 | 193 | 1.34 |
| 18 | Draymond Green^ | PF | Golden State Warriors (2013–2019, 2022–2023, 2025) | 257 | 169 | 1.52 |
| 19 | Kawhi Leonard^ | SF | San Antonio Spurs (2012–2017); Toronto Raptors (2019); Los Angeles Clippers (2020–2021, 2023–2025) | 256 | 146 | 1.75 |
| 20 | Dennis Johnson* | PG/SG | Seattle SuperSonics (1978–1980); Phoenix Suns (1981–1983); Boston Celtics (1984–1990) | 247 | 180 | 1.37 |
| 21 | Hakeem Olajuwon* | C | Houston Rockets (1985–1991, 1993–1999); Toronto Raptors (2002) | 245 | 145 | 1.69 |
| 22 | Julius Erving* | SF | Philadelphia 76ers (1977–1987) | 235 | 141 | 1.67 |
| 23 | Isiah Thomas* | PG | Detroit Pistons (1984–1992) | 234 | 111 | 2.11 |
| 24 | Stephen Curry^ | PG | Golden State Warriors (2013–2019, 2022–2023, 2025) | 231 | 155 | 1.49 |
| 25 | Rajon Rondo | PG | Boston Celtics (2008–2012); Dallas Mavericks (2015); Chicago Bulls (2017); New Orleans Pelicans (2018); Los Angeles Lakers (2020); Los Angeles Clippers (2021) | 228 | 134 | 1.70 |
| Rank | Player | Position(s) | Playoff team(s) played for (years) | Total steals | Games played | Steals per game average |

== Progressive list for steals ==
This is a progressive list of steals leaders showing how the record has increased through the years.

| ^ | Active NBA player |
| * | Inducted into the Naismith Memorial Basketball Hall of Fame |

Statistics accurate as of the 2026 NBA playoffs.

Team AbbreviationsTeam listed is the one player was on when he established the record.
| ATL | Atlanta Hawks | DEN | Denver Nuggets | LAL | Los Angeles Lakers | OKC | Oklahoma City Thunder | WAS | Washington Wizards |
| BOS | Boston Celtics | DET | Detroit Pistons | MEM | Memphis Grizzlies | ORL | Orlando Magic | WSB | Washington Bullets |
| CHI | Chicago Bulls | GSW | Golden State Warriors | MIA | Miami Heat | POR | Portland Trail Blazers | | |
| CHO | Charlotte Hornets | HOU | Houston Rockets | NJN | New Jersey Nets | SAS | San Antonio Spurs | | |
| CLE | Cleveland Cavaliers | IND | Indiana Pacers | NOP | New Orleans Pelicans | UTA | Utah Jazz | | |
| DAL | Dallas Mavericks | LAC | Los Angeles Clippers | NYK | New York Knicks | TOR | Toronto Raptors | | |

Playoff Steals Leaders at the end of every season
| Season | Year-by-year leader | Stl | Active leader | Stl | Career record | Stl | Single-season record | Stl | Season |
|---|---|---|---|---|---|---|---|---|---|
| 1973–74 | Don ChaneyBOS John Havlicek*BOS | 24 | Don ChaneyBOS John Havlicek*BOS | 24 | Don ChaneyBOS John Havlicek*BOS | 24 | Don ChaneyBOS & John Havlicek*BOS | 24 | 1973–74 |
| 1974–75 | Rick Barry*GSW | 50 | Rick Barry*; GSW 1974–78; HOU 1978–79 | 50 | Rick Barry*; GSW 1974–78; HOU 1978–79 | 50 | Rick Barry*GSW | 50 | 1974–75 |
| 1975–76 | Gar HeardPHX | 39 | Rick Barry*; GSW 1974–78; HOU 1978–79 | 88 | Rick Barry*; GSW 1974–78; HOU 1978–79 | 88 | Rick Barry*GSW | 50 | 1975–76 |
| 1976–77 | Lionel HollinsPOR | 47 | Rick Barry*; GSW 1974–78; HOU 1978–79 | 105 | Rick Barry*; GSW 1974–78; HOU 1978–79 | 105 | Rick Barry*GSW | 50 | 1976–77 |
| 1977–78 | Gus WilliamsSEA | 45 | Rick Barry*; GSW 1974–78; HOU 1978–79 | 105 | Rick Barry*; GSW 1974–78; HOU 1978–79 | 105 | Rick Barry*GSW | 50 | 1977–78 |
| 1978–79 | Maurice Cheeks*PHI | 37 | Rick Barry*; GSW 1974–78; HOU 1978–79 | 105 | Rick Barry*; GSW 1974–78; HOU 1978–79 | 105 | Rick Barry*GSW | 50 | 1978–79 |
| 1979–80 | Magic Johnson*LAL | 49 | Gus WilliamsSEA | 132 | Gus WilliamsSEA | 132 | Rick Barry*GSW | 50 | 1979–80 |
| 1980–81 | Robert ReidHOU | 50 | Julius Erving*PHI Gus WilliamsSEA | 132 | Julius Erving*PHI Gus WilliamsSEA | 132 | Rick Barry* & Robert ReidHOU | 50 | 1980–81 |
| 1981–82 | Maurice Cheeks*PHI | 48 | Maurice Cheeks*PHI | 170 | Maurice Cheeks*PHI | 170 | Rick Barry* & Robert ReidHOU | 50 | 1981–82 |
| 1982–83 | Magic Johnson*LAL | 34 | Maurice Cheeks*PHI | 196 | Maurice Cheeks*PHI | 196 | Rick Barry* & Robert ReidHOU | 50 | 1982–83 |
| 1983–84 | Larry Bird*BOS | 54 | Maurice Cheeks*PHI | 209 | Maurice Cheeks*PHI | 209 | Larry Bird*BOS | 54 | 1983–84 |
| 1984–85 | Byron ScottLAL | 41 | Maurice Cheeks*PHI | 240 | Maurice Cheeks*PHI | 240 | Larry Bird*BOS | 54 | 1984–85 |
| 1985–86 | Danny AingeBOS | 41 | Maurice Cheeks*PHI | 253 | Maurice Cheeks*PHI | 253 | Larry Bird*BOS | 54 | 1985–86 |
| 1986–87 | Isiah Thomas*DET | 39 | Magic Johnson*LAL | 263 | Magic Johnson*LAL | 263 | Larry Bird*BOS | 54 | 1986–87 |
| 1987–88 | Isiah Thomas*DET | 66 | Magic Johnson*LAL | 297 | Magic Johnson*LAL | 297 | Isiah Thomas*DET | 66 | 1987–88 |
| 1988–89 | Michael Jordan*CHI | 42 | Magic Johnson*LAL | 324 | Magic Johnson*LAL | 324 | Isiah Thomas*DET | 66 | 1988–89 |
| 1989–90 | Clyde Drexler*POR | 53 | Magic Johnson*LAL | 335 | Magic Johnson*LAL | 335 | Isiah Thomas*DET | 66 | 1989–90 |
| 1990–91 | Scottie Pippen*CHI | 42 | Magic Johnson*LAL | 358 | Magic Johnson*LAL | 358 | Isiah Thomas*DET | 66 | 1990–91 |
| 1991–92 | Michael Jordan*CHI | 44 | Isiah Thomas*DET | 234 | Magic Johnson*LAL | 358 | Isiah Thomas*DET | 66 | 1991–92 |
| 1992–93 | Scottie Pippen*CHI | 41 | Michael Jordan*CHI | 258 | Magic Johnson*LAL | 358 | Isiah Thomas*DET | 66 | 1992–93 |
| 1993–94 | Derek HarperNYK | 42 | Scottie Pippen*CHI | 210 | Magic Johnson*LAL | 358 | Isiah Thomas*DET | 66 | 1993–94 |
| 1994–95 | Penny HardawayORL | 40 | Michael Jordan*CHI | 281 | Magic Johnson*LAL | 358 | Isiah Thomas*DET | 66 | 1994–95 |
| 1995–96 | Scottie Pippen*CHI | 47 | Magic Johnson*LAL | 358 | Magic Johnson*LAL | 358 | Isiah Thomas*DET | 66 | 1995–96 |
| 1996–97 | Hakeem Olajuwon*HOU; John Stockton*UTA | 33 | Michael Jordan*CHI | 344 | Magic Johnson*LAL | 358 | Isiah Thomas*DET | 66 | 1996–97 |
| 1997–98 | Scottie Pippen*CHI | 45 | Michael Jordan*CHI | 376 | Michael Jordan*CHI | 376 | Isiah Thomas*DET | 66 | 1997–98 |
| 1998–99 | Charlie WardNYK | 35 | Scottie Pippen*; HOU 1998–99; POR 1999–03; CHI 2003–04 | 351 | Michael Jordan*CHI | 376 | Isiah Thomas*DET | 66 | 1998–99 |
| 1999–00 | Kobe Bryant*LAL; Scottie Pippen*POR | 32 | Scottie Pippen*; HOU 1998–99; POR 1999–03; CHI 2003–04 | 383 | Scottie Pippen*; POR 1999–03; CHI 2003–04 | 383 | Isiah Thomas*DET | 66 | 1999–00 |
| 2000–01 | Allen Iverson*PHI | 52 | Scottie Pippen*; HOU 1998–99; POR 1999–03; CHI 2003–04 | 391 | Scottie Pippen*; POR 1999–03; CHI 2003–04 | 391 | Isiah Thomas*DET | 66 | 2000–01 |
| 2001–02 | Jason Kidd*NJN | 34 | Scottie Pippen*; HOU 1998–99; POR 1999–03; CHI 2003–04 | 395 | Scottie Pippen*; POR 1999–03; CHI 2003–04 | 395 | Isiah Thomas*DET | 66 | 2001–02 |
| 2002–03 | Ben Wallace*DET | 42 | Scottie Pippen*; HOU 1998–99; POR 1999–03; CHI 2003–04 | 395 | Scottie Pippen*; POR 1999–03; CHI 2003–04 | 395 | Isiah Thomas*DET | 66 | 2002–03 |
| 2003–04 | Ben Wallace*DET | 44 | Scottie Pippen*; HOU 1998–99; POR 1999–03; CHI 2003–04 | 395 | Scottie Pippen*; POR 1999–03; CHI 2003–04 | 395 | Isiah Thomas*DET | 66 | 2003–04 |
| 2004–05 | Ben Wallace*DET | 43 | Robert HorrySAS | 255 | Scottie Pippen*; POR 1999–03; CHI 2003–04 | 395 | Isiah Thomas*DET | 66 | 2004–05 |
| 2005–06 | Dwyane Wade*MIA | 51 | Robert HorrySAS | 260 | Scottie Pippen*; POR 1999–03; CHI 2003–04 | 395 | Isiah Thomas*DET | 66 | 2005–06 |
| 2006–07 | LeBron James^CLE | 34 | Robert HorrySAS | 271 | Scottie Pippen*; POR 1999–03; CHI 2003–04 | 395 | Isiah Thomas*DET | 66 | 2006–07 |
| 2007–08 | Rajon RondoBOS | 45 | Robert HorrySAS | 276 | Scottie Pippen*; POR 1999–03; CHI 2003–04 | 395 | Isiah Thomas*DET | 66 | 2007–08 |
| 2008–09 | Kobe Bryant*LAL | 38 | Kobe Bryant*LAL | 247 | Scottie Pippen*; POR 1999–03; CHI 2003–04 | 395 | Isiah Thomas*DET | 66 | 2008–09 |
| 2009–10 | Rajon RondoBOS | 46 | Kobe Bryant*LAL | 278 | Scottie Pippen*; POR 1999–03; CHI 2003–04 | 395 | Isiah Thomas*DET | 66 | 2009–10 |
| 2010–11 | Jason Kidd*DAL | 40 | Kobe Bryant*LAL | 294 | Scottie Pippen*; POR 1999–03; CHI 2003–04 | 395 | Isiah Thomas*DET | 66 | 2010–11 |
| 2011–12 | Rajon RondoBOS | 45 | Kobe Bryant*LAL | 310 | Scottie Pippen*; POR 1999–03; CHI 2003–04 | 395 | Isiah Thomas*DET | 66 | 2011–12 |
| 2012–13 | LeBron James^MIA | 41 | Kobe Bryant*LAL | 310 | Scottie Pippen*; POR 1999–03; CHI 2003–04 | 395 | Isiah Thomas*DET | 66 | 2012–13 |
| 2013–14 | Paul George^IND; Russell Westbrook^OKC | 41 | Kobe Bryant*LAL | 310 | Scottie Pippen*; POR 1999–03; CHI 2003–04 | 395 | Isiah Thomas*DET | 66 | 2013–14 |
| 2014–15 | Stephen Curry^GSW | 39 | Kobe Bryant*LAL | 310 | Scottie Pippen*; POR 1999–03; CHI 2003–04 | 395 | Isiah Thomas*DET | 66 | 2014–15 |
| 2015–16 | LeBron James^CLE | 49 | LeBron James^ CLE 2015–18; LAL 2018–26 | 354 | Scottie Pippen*; POR 1999–03; CHI 2003–04 | 395 | Isiah Thomas*DET | 66 | 2015–16 |
| 2016–17 | LeBron James^CLE | 35 | LeBron James^ CLE 2015–18; LAL 2018–26 | 389 | Scottie Pippen*; POR 1999–03; CHI 2003–04 | 395 | Isiah Thomas*DET | 66 | 2016–17 |
| 2017–18 | Draymond Green^GSW | 41 | LeBron James^ CLE 2015–18; LAL 2018–26 | 419 | LeBron James^ CLE 2017–18; LAL 2018–26 | 419 | Isiah Thomas*DET | 66 | 2017–18 |
| 2018–19 | Kawhi Leonard^TOR | 40 | LeBron James^ CLE 2015–18; LAL 2018–26 | 419 | LeBron James^ CLE 2017–18; LAL 2018–26 | 419 | Isiah Thomas*DET | 66 | 2018–19 |
| 2019–20 | Jimmy Butler^MIA | 41 | LeBron James^ CLE 2015–18; LAL 2018–26 | 445 | LeBron James^ CLE 2017–18; LAL 2018–26 | 445 | Isiah Thomas*DET | 66 | 2019–20 |
| 2020–21 | Jrue Holiday^MIL | 38 | LeBron James^ CLE 2015–18; LAL 2018–26 | 454 | LeBron James^ CLE 2017–18; LAL 2018–26 | 454 | Isiah Thomas*DET | 66 | 2020–21 |
| 2021–22 | Jimmy Butler^MIA | 35 | LeBron James^ CLE 2015–18; LAL 2018–26 | 454 | LeBron James^ CLE 2017–18; LAL 2018–26 | 454 | Isiah Thomas*DET | 66 | 2021–22 |
| 2022–23 | Jimmy Butler^MIA | 40 | LeBron James^ CLE 2015–18; LAL 2018–26 | 471 | LeBron James^ CLE 2017–18; LAL 2018–26 | 471 | Isiah Thomas*DET | 66 | 2022–23 |
| 2023–24 | Luka Dončić^DAL | 41 | LeBron James^ CLE 2015–18; LAL 2018–26 | 483 | LeBron James^ CLE 2017–18; LAL 2018–26 | 483 | Isiah Thomas*DET | 66 | 2023–24 |
| 2024–25 | Alex Caruso^OKC | 45 | LeBron James^ CLE 2015–18; LAL 2018–26 | 493 | LeBron James^ CLE 2017–18; LAL 2018–26 | 493 | Isiah Thomas*DET | 66 | 2024–25 |
| 2025–26 | Josh Hart^NYK; Cason Wallace^OKC | 32 | LeBron James^ CLE 2015–18; LAL 2018–26 | 506 | LeBron James^ CLE 2017–18; LAL 2018–26 | 506 | Isiah Thomas*DET | 66 | 2025–26 |
| Season | Year-by-year leader | Stl | Active player leader | Stl | Career record | Stl | Single-season record | Stl | Season |

== See also ==
- Basketball statistics
- NBA post-season records
