= 1996–97 Los Angeles Lakers season =

NBA professional basketball team season

- Head coach: Del Harris
- General manager: Jerry West
- Owner: Jerry Buss
- Arena: Great Western Forum

Results
- Record: 56–26 (.683)
- Place: Division: 2nd (Pacific); Conference: 4th (Western)
- Playoff finish: Conference semifinals (lost to Jazz 1–4)
- Stats at Basketball Reference

Local media
- Television: KCAL-TV; Fox Sports West
- Radio: KLAC

The 1996–97 Los Angeles Lakers season was the 49th season for the Los Angeles Lakers in the National Basketball Association, and their 37th season in Los Angeles, California.

== Season summary ==
=== Off-season ===
This season was mostly remembered for the Lakers signing free agent All-Star center Shaquille O'Neal to a seven-year, $120 million contract, and acquiring rookie shooting guard, and high school basketball star Kobe Bryant from the Charlotte Hornets, who selected him with the 13th overall pick in the 1996 NBA draft during the off-season. In the draft, the Lakers selected point guard Derek Fisher from the University of Arkansas at Little Rock with the 24th overall pick. The team also signed former "Showtime"-era Lakers guard Byron Scott, signed free agents Jerome Kersey, and Sean Rooks, and acquired rookie center Travis Knight out of the University of Connecticut from the Chicago Bulls.

=== Regular season ===
With the addition of O'Neal, Bryant and Scott, the Lakers won eight of their first eleven games of the regular season, and posted a six-game winning streak between December and January. In January, the team traded Cedric Ceballos back to his former team, the Phoenix Suns, in exchange for Robert Horry, who won two NBA championships with the Houston Rockets. The Lakers posted another six-game winning streak between January and February, and held the best record in the Western Conference at the All-Star break with a 35–13 record. However, the Lakers soon slipped out of first-place, by finishing in second place in the Pacific Division with a 56–26 record, and earning the fourth seed in the Western Conference. The team had the eighth best team defensive rating in the NBA.

O'Neal averaged 26.2 points, 12.5 rebounds and 2.9 blocks per game, but only played 51 games due to a knee injury, and was named to the All-NBA Third Team, while Eddie Jones averaged 17.2 points and 2.4 steals per game, along with 152 three-point field goals, and Nick Van Exel provided the team with 15.3 points and 8.5 assists per game, and led the Lakers with 177 three-point field goals. In addition, Elden Campbell provided with 14.9 points, 8.0 rebounds and 1.5 blocks per game, while Horry averaged 9.2 points, 5.4 rebounds, 1.7 steals and 1.3 blocks per game in 22 games after the trade, and Kersey contributed 6.8 points, 5.2 rebounds and 1.7 steals per game. Off the bench, Bryant averaged 7.6 points per game, while Scott contributed 6.7 points per game, Knight averaged 4.8 points and 4.5 rebounds per game, Corie Blount provided with 4.2 points and 4.8 rebounds per game, and Fisher contributed 3.9 points and 1.5 assists per game. Bryant and Knight were both named to the NBA All-Rookie Second Team.

During the NBA All-Star weekend at the Gund Arena in Cleveland, Ohio, O'Neal and Jones were both selected for the 1997 NBA All-Star Game, as members of the Western Conference All-Star team; it was Jones's first ever All-Star appearance. However, O'Neal did not participate due to injury. Meanwhile, Bryant won the NBA Slam Dunk Contest. In addition, Bryant, Knight and Fisher were all selected for the NBA Rookie Game, as members of the Western Conference Rookie team. Bryant scored 31 points along with 8 rebounds and 2 steals, despite the Western Conference losing to the Eastern Conference, 96–91. O'Neal also finished tied in ninth place in Most Valuable Player voting, while Jones finished tied in twelfth place in Most Improved Player voting.

The Lakers finished 15th in the NBA in home-game attendance, with an attendance of 697,159 at the Great Western Forum during the regular season.

=== NBA playoffs ===
In the Western Conference First Round of the 1997 NBA playoffs, the Lakers faced off against the 5th–seeded Portland Trail Blazers, a team that featured Kenny Anderson, Isaiah Rider and Clifford Robinson. The Lakers won the first two games over the Trail Blazers at home at the Great Western Forum, before losing Game 3 on the road, 98–90 at the Rose Garden Arena. The Lakers won Game 4 over the Trail Blazers on the road, 95–91 to win the series in four games.

In the Western Conference Semi-finals, the team faced off against the top–seeded, and Midwest Division champion Utah Jazz, who were led by the trio of All-Star forward, and Most Valuable Player of the Year, Karl Malone, All-Star guard John Stockton, and Jeff Hornacek. The Lakers lost the first two games to the Jazz on the road at the Delta Center, but managed to win Game 3 at the Great Western Forum, 104–84. However, the Lakers lost the next two games, which included a Game 5 loss to the Jazz at the Delta Center, 98–93, thus losing the series in five games.

The Jazz would advance to the NBA Finals for the first time in franchise history, but would lose to the defending NBA champion Chicago Bulls in six games in the 1997 NBA Finals.

=== Notable highlights ===
One notable highlight of the regular season occurred on April 6, 1997, in a home game against the Dallas Mavericks at the Great Western Forum. After trailing 51–37 at halftime, the Lakers held the Mavericks to only just two points in the third quarter, outscoring them 23–2 in that quarter, and winning the game by a score of 87–80. The Mavericks' two points were the fewest points scored in a quarter of a game in NBA history.

=== Aftermath ===
Following the season, Scott went overseas and signed with the Greek Basket League giants Panathinaikos for the 1997–98 season, while Kersey signed as a free agent with the Seattle SuperSonics, and Knight signed with the Boston Celtics.

== Draft picks ==
Round	Pick	Player	Position	Nationality	College
1	24	Derek Fisher	Guard	United States	Arkansas–Little Rock

Before he was chosen as the 13th overall draft pick by the Charlotte Hornets in 1996, the 17-year-old Bryant had made a lasting impression on then-Lakers general manager Jerry West, who immediately foresaw potential in Bryant's basketball ability during pre-draft workouts. He went on to state that Bryant's workouts against former Lakers players and then assistant coaches Michael Cooper, and Larry Drew were the best he had ever seen. Immediately after the draft, Bryant expressed that he did not wish to play for the Hornets and wanted to play for the Lakers instead. Fifteen days later, West traded his starting center, Vlade Divac to the Hornets for the young Kobe Bryant.

== Roster ==
1996–97 Los Angeles Lakers roster
Players

Pos.	No.	Player	Height	Weight	DOB	From
F	43	Corie Blount	6 ft 9 in (2.06 m)	240 lb (109 kg)	1969–01–04	Cincinnati
G	8	Kobe Bryant	6 ft 6 in (1.98 m)	205 lb (93 kg)	1978–08–23	Lower Merion HS
F	41	Elden Campbell	6 ft 11 in (2.11 m)	215 lb (98 kg)	1968–07–23	Clemson
G	2	Derek Fisher	6 ft 1 in (1.85 m)	210 lb (95 kg)	1974–08–09	Little Rock
F	5	Robert Horry	6 ft 9 in (2.06 m)	220 lb (100 kg)	1970–08–25	Alabama
G	6	Eddie Jones	6 ft 6 in (1.98 m)	190 lb (86 kg)	1971–10–20	Temple
F	12	Jerome Kersey	6 ft 7 in (2.01 m)	215 lb (98 kg)	1962–06–26	Longwood
C	40	Travis Knight	6 ft 10 in (2.08 m)	235 lb (107 kg)	1974–09–13	Connecticut
F	7	Larry Krystkowiak	6 ft 9 in (2.06 m)	220 lb (100 kg)	1964–09–23	Montana
F	24	George McCloud	6 ft 6 in (1.98 m)	205 lb (93 kg)	1967–05–27	Florida State
C	34	Shaquille O'Neal	7 ft 1 in (2.16 m)	325 lb (147 kg)	1972–03–06	LSU
C	45	Sean Rooks	6 ft 10 in (2.08 m)	250 lb (113 kg)	1969–09–09	Arizona
G	4	Byron Scott	6 ft 3 in (1.91 m)	195 lb (88 kg)	1961–03–28	Arizona State
G	9	Nick Van Exel	6 ft 1 in (1.85 m)	170 lb (77 kg)	1971–11–27	Cincinnati

Coaches
Head coach
- Del Harris
Assistant(s)
- Bill Bertka
- Larry Drew
- Kurt Rambis

Legend
- (DP) Unsigned draft pick
- (FA) Free agent
- (S) Suspended
- Injured

Roster
Updated: February 24, 1997

== Regular season ==
=== Kobe's rookie season ===
During his first season, Bryant mostly came off the bench behind guards Eddie Jones and Nick Van Exel. Initially, he played limited minutes, but as the season continued, he began to see some more playing time. He earned himself a reputation as a high-flyer and a fan-favorite by winning the 1997 Slam Dunk Contest during the All-Star Weekend in Cleveland. He averaged 7.6 points and 15.5 minutes per game in 71 games, and was named to the NBA All-Rookie Second Team.

=== Season standings ===
Pacific Division	W	L	PCT	GB	Home	Road	Div
y-Seattle SuperSonics	57	25	.695	–	31–10	26–15	16–8
x-Los Angeles Lakers	56	26	.683	1	31–10	25–16	18–6
x-Portland Trail Blazers	49	33	.598	8	29–12	20–21	15–9
x-Phoenix Suns	40	42	.488	17	25–16	15–26	13–11
x-Los Angeles Clippers	36	46	.439	21	21–20	15–26	10–14
Sacramento Kings	34	48	.415	23	22–19	12–29	8–16
Golden State Warriors	30	52	.366	27	18–23	12–29	4–20

1996–97 NBA West standings
#	Western Conference				
#	Team	W	L	PCT	GB
1	c-Utah Jazz	64	18	.780	–
2	y-Seattle SuperSonics	57	25	.695	7
3	x-Houston Rockets	57	25	.695	7
4	x-Los Angeles Lakers	56	26	.683	8
5	x-Portland Trail Blazers	49	33	.598	15
6	x-Minnesota Timberwolves	40	42	.488	24
7	x-Phoenix Suns	40	42	.488	24
8	x-Los Angeles Clippers	36	46	.439	28
9	Sacramento Kings	34	48	.415	30
10	Golden State Warriors	30	52	.366	34
11	Dallas Mavericks	24	58	.293	40
12	Denver Nuggets	21	61	.256	43
13	San Antonio Spurs	20	62	.244	44
14	Vancouver Grizzlies	14	68	.171	50

== Game log ==
=== Pre-season ===
1996 preseason game log
Total: 5–3
Preseason

Game	Date	Team	Score	High points	High rebounds	High assists	Location Attendance	Record
1	October 10	Denver	W 111-101	Shaquille O'Neal (25)	Shaquille O'Neal (10)	Nick Van Exel (8)	Stan Sheriff Center (Honolulu, HI); 10,225	1–0
2	October 12	Denver	W 105-96	Shaquille O'Neal (27)	Shaquille O'Neal (15)	Derek Fisher (4)	Stan Sheriff Center (Honolulu, HI); 10,225	2–0
3	October 16	Dallas	W 90-80	Shaquille O'Neal (12)	Corie Blount (9)	3 players tied (3)	Selland Arena (Fresno, CA); 10,274	3–0
4	October 18	Philadelphia	W 113-92	Shaquille O'Neal (25)	Shaquille O'Neal (10)	Jones & Van Exel (5)	Great Western Forum; 14,149	4–0
5	October 19	Phoenix	W 100-87	Nick Van Exel (19)	Shaquille O'Neal (10)	Nick Van Exel (10)	Great Western Forum; 15,054	5–0
6	October 22	Houston	L 114-116	Cedric Ceballos (26)	Shaquille O'Neal (9)	Nick Van Exel (9)	San Diego Sports Arena (San Diego, CA); 13,481	5–1
7	October 23	Phoenix	L 100-109	Byron Scott (25)	Cedric Ceballos (9)	Cedric Ceballos (4)	McKale Center (Tucson, AZ); 14,162	5–2
8	October 25	Seattle	L 94–99	Byron Scott (16)			BSU Pavilion (Boise, ID)	5–3

1997 schedule

=== Regular season ===
1996–97 game log
Total: 56-26 (home: 31-10; road: 25–16)
November: 11–6 (home: 5–2; road: 6–4)

Game	Date	Team	Score	High points	High rebounds	High assists	Location Attendance	Record
1	November 1	Phoenix	W 96-82	Shaquille O'Neal (23)	Shaquille O'Neal (14)	Nick Van Exel (8)	Great Western Forum; 17,505	1–0
2	November 3	Minnesota	W 91-85	Shaquille O'Neal (35)	Shaquille O'Neal (19)	Nick Van Exel (11)	Great Western Forum; 15,407	2–0
3	November 5	@ New York	W 98-92	Shaquille O'Neal (26)	Shaquille O'Neal (13)	Nick Van Exel (8)	Madison Square Garden; 19,763	3–0
4	November 6	@ Charlotte	L 78-88	Shaquille O'Neal (22)	Shaquille O'Neal (10)	Nick Van Exel (7)	Charlotte Coliseum; 24,042	3–1
5	November 8	@ Toronto	L 92-93	Jones & O'Neal (25)	Shaquille O'Neal (10)	Campbell & Van Exel (4)	SkyDome; 27,357	3–2
6	November 10	Atlanta	W 92-85	Jones & O'Neal (19)	Shaquille O'Neal (18)	Nick Van Exel (5)	Great Western Forum; 16,097	4–2
7	November 12	@ Houston	W 126-115 (2OT)	Shaquille O'Neal (34)	Shaquille O'Neal (15)	Nick Van Exel (14)	The Summit; 16,285	5–2
8	November 13	@ San Antonio	L 83-95	Shaquille O'Neal (30)	Shaquille O'Neal (10)	Nick Van Exel (8)	Alamodome; 26,002	5–3
9	November 15	L.A. Clippers	W 107-100	Eddie Jones (32)	Elden Campbell (10)	Nick Van Exel (15)	Great Western Forum; 16,207	6–3
10	November 17	@ Phoenix	W 102-88	Eddie Jones (18)	Shaquille O'Neal (13)	Nick Van Exel (9)	American West Arena; 19,023	7–3
11	November 19	@ Golden State	W 112-109	Nick Van Exel (27)	Shaquille O'Neal (12)	Nick Van Exel (12)	San Jose Arena; 18,742	8–3
12	November 20	Utah	L 97-113	Shaquille O'Neal (26)	Shaquille O'Neal (15)	Nick Van Exel (11)	Great Western Forum; 16,122	8–4
13	November 22	San Antonio	W 96-86	Shaquille O'Neal (29)	Shaquille O'Neal (21)	Nick Van Exel (9)	Great Western Forum; 17,505	9–4
14	November 24	Houston	L 85-90	Shaquille O'Neal (23)	Shaquille O'Neal (11)	Nick Van Exel (12)	Great Western Forum; 17,505	9–5
15	November 26	@ Philadelphia	W 100-88	Jones & O'Neal (23)	Shaquille O'Neal (20)	Jones & Van Exel (6)	CoreStates Center; 20,652	10–5
16	November 27	@ Boston	L 94-110	Shaquille O'Neal (22)	Shaquille O'Neal (10)	Shaquille O'Neal (5)	Fleet Center; 18,624	10–6
17	November 29	@ Detroit	W 84-76	Shaquille O'Neal (27)	Elden Campbell (12)	Nick Van Exel (10)	The Palace of Auburn Hills; 21,454	11–6

December: 11–3 (home: 8–0; road: 3–3)

Game	Date	Team	Score	High points	High rebounds	High assists	Location Attendance	Record
18	December 1	Denver	W 104-96	O'Neal & Van Exel (24)	Shaquille O'Neal (16)	Shaquille O'Neal (8)	Great Western Forum; 15,684	12–6
19	December 3	Seattle	W 110-106	Shaquille O'Neal (32)	Shaquille O'Neal (14)	Eddie Jones (9)	Great Western Forum; 17,505	13–6
20	December 4	@ Utah	L 75-101	Shaquille O'Neal (21)	Shaquille O'Neal (8)	Derek Fisher (3)	Delta Center; 19,911	13–7
21	December 6	Orlando	W 92-81	Shaquille O'Neal (25)	Shaquille O'Neal (18)	Nick Van Exel (11)	Great Western Forum; 17,505	14–7
22	December 8	Minnesota	W 110-86	Nick Van Exel (23)	Shaquille O'Neal (10)	Nick Van Exel (7)	Great Western Forum; 15,212	15–7
23	December 10	@ Sacramento	W 92-90	Shaquille O'Neal (27)	Shaquille O'Neal (13)	Derek Fisher (6)	ARCO Arena; 17,317	16–7
24	December 11	Indiana	W 79-76	Shaquille O'Neal (33)	Shaquille O'Neal (10)	Nick Van Exel (8)	Great Western Forum; 16,139	17–7
25	December 13	Portland	W 120-119 (OT)	Shaquille O'Neal (34)	Shaquille O'Neal (10)	Nick Van Exel (15)	Great Western Forum; 16,315	18–7
26	December 17	@ Chicago	L 123-129 (OT)	Nick Van Exel (36)	Elden Campbell (14)	Nick Van Exel (6)	United Center; 23,919	18–8
27	December 18	@ Milwaukee	W 111-105	Shaquille O'Neal (41)	Shaquille O'Neal (13)	Nick Van Exel (11)	Bradley Center; 16,829	19–8
28	December 21	@ Minnesota	L 88-103	Nick Van Exel (22)	Shaquille O'Neal (17)	Nick Van Exel (9)	Target Center; 18,127	19–9
29	December 25	@ Phoenix	W 108-87	Shaquille O'Neal (26)	Shaquille O'Neal (16)	Nick Van Exel (12)	American West Arena; 19,023	20–9
30	December 27	Boston	W 109-102	Shaquille O'Neal (25)	Campbell & O'Neal (11)	Jones & Van Exel (5)	Great Western Forum; 17,505	21–9
31	December 29	Philadelphia	W 115-102	Shaquille O'Neal (28)	Travis Knight (10)	Nick Van Exel (11)	Great Western Forum; 17,505	22–9

January: 11–3 (home: 6–2; road: 5–1)

Game	Date	Team	Score	High points	High rebounds	High assists	Location Attendance	Record
32	January 2	@ Sacramento	W 90-83	Shaquille O'Neal (25)	Shaquille O'Neal (16)	Nick Van Exel (6)	ARCO Arena; 17,317	23–9
33	January 3	Sacramento	W 100-93	Elden Campbell (22)	Elden Campbell (15)	Derek Fisher (6)	Great Western Forum; 17,505	24–9
34	January 5	@ Vancouver	W 95-82	Shaquille O'Neal (31)	Shaquille O'Neal (12)	Nick Van Exel (23)	General Motors Place; 19,193	25–9
35	January 6	@ Portland	L 84-88	Shaquille O'Neal (34)	Shaquille O'Neal (12)	Nick Van Exel (9)	Rose Garden; 21,538	25–10
36	January 8	Charlotte	W 101-97	Shaquille O'Neal (23)	Shaquille O'Neal (16)	Nick Van Exel (10)	Great Western Forum; 16,980	26–10
37	January 10	Miami	W 94-85	Shaquille O'Neal (34)	Shaquille O'Neal (14)	Nick Van Exel (8)	Great Western Forum; 17,505	27–10
38	January 14	Vancouver	W 91-81	Shaquille O'Neal (24)	Knight & O'Neal (12)	Nick Van Exel (6)	Great Western Forum; 15,606	28–10
39	January 16	Portland	L 98-102	Shaquille O'Neal (33)	Shaquille O'Neal (13)	Nick Van Exel (8)	Great Western Forum; 16,432	28–11
40	January 18	Detroit	L 97-100 (2OT)	Kobe Bryant (21)	Shaquille O'Neal (19)	Nick Van Exel (9)	Great Western Forum; 17,505	28–12
41	January 20	Dallas	W 109-99	Nick Van Exel (24)	Shaquille O'Neal (13)	Nick Van Exel (8)	Great Western Forum; 16,959	29–12
42	January 24	Golden State	W 114-97	Shaquille O'Neal (33)	Travis Knight (15)	Nick Van Exel (12)	Great Western Forum; 17,505	30–12
43	January 26	@ Seattle	W 104-103	Nick Van Exel (25)	Shaquille O'Neal (11)	Nick Van Exel (6)	KeyArena; 17,072	31–12
44	January 28	@ Dallas	W 102-83	Shaquille O'Neal (31)	Shaquille O'Neal (10)	Nick Van Exel (6)	Reunion Arena; 18,042	32–12
45	January 29	@ San Antonio	W 99-92	Eddie Jones (23)	Shaquille O'Neal (19)	Nick Van Exel (12)	Alamodome; 25,570	33–12

February: 6–6 (home: 3–3; road: 3–3)

Game	Date	Team	Score	High points	High rebounds	High assists	Location Attendance	Record
46	February 2	Washington	W 129-99	Shaquille O'Neal (24)	Elden Campbell (10)	Nick Van Exel (6)	Great Western Forum; 17,505	34–12
47	February 4	@ L.A. Clippers	L 86-108	Campbell & Van Exel (20)	Travis Knight (7)	Campbell & Van Exel (4)	Arrowhead Pond; 18,462	34–13
48	February 5	Chicago	W 106-90	Elden Campbell (34)	Elden Campbell (14)	Nick Van Exel (13)	Great Western Forum; 17,505	35–13
All-Star Break
49	February 12	@ Minnesota	W 100-84	Elden Campbell (21)	Robert Horry (10)	Robert Horry (8)	Target Center; 18,243	36–13
50	February 13	@ Denver	W 132-117	Nick Van Exel (30)	Kersey & Rooks (6)	Nick Van Exel (9)	McNichols Sports Arena; 16,713	37–13
51	February 16	Seattle	L 91-102	Eddie Jones (26)	Elden Campbell (17)	Nick Van Exel (11)	Great Western Forum; 17,505	37–14
52	February 19	Cleveland	L 84-103	Elden Campbell (23)	Travis Knight (9)	Nick Van Exel (7)	Great Western Forum; 16,402	37–15
53	February 21	Vancouver	W 99-91	Campbell & Jones (23)	Elden Campbell (12)	Jones & Van Exel (8)	Great Western Forum; 17,031	38–15
54	February 23	New York	L 121-127 (2OT)	Elden Campbell (40)	Travis Knight (13)	Nick Van Exel (16)	Great Western Forum; 17,505	38–16
55	February 25	@ Houston	L 96-100	Elden Campbell (19)	Elden Campbell (9)	Nick Van Exel (11)	The Summit; 16,285	38–17
56	February 27	@ Washington	W 122-107	Elden Campbell (38)	Eddie Jones (8)	Nick Van Exel (12)	US Airways Arena; 18,756	39–17
57	February 28	@ Atlanta	L 75-86	Eddie Jones (17)	Elden Campbell (7)	Eddie Jones (5)	Omni Coliseum; 16,378	39–18

March: 9–5 (home: 4–2; road: 5–3)

Game	Date	Team	Score	High points	High rebounds	High assists	Location Attendance	Record
58	March 2	@ Indiana	L 85-101	Eddie Jones (28)	Corie Blount (10)	Nick Van Exel (9)	Market Square Arena; 16,711	39–19
59	March 4	@ Dallas	W 102-92	Nick Van Exel (37)	Elden Campbell (10)	4 players tied (2)	Reunion Arena; 15,809	40–19
60	March 7	Houston	L 90-111	Campbell & Jones (17)	Elden Campbell (7)	Nick Van Exel (6)	Great Western Forum; 17,505	40–20
61	March 9	New Jersey	W 115-105	Eddie Jones (34)	Eddie Jones (13)	Fisher & Van Exel (5)	Great Western Forum; 17,103	41–20
62	March 12	Golden State	W 109-101	Elden Campbell (26)	Corie Blount (15)	Nick Van Exel (14)	Great Western Forum; 17,009	42–20
63	March 14	L.A. Clippers	L 95-97	Eddie Jones (22)	Corie Blount (15)	Nick Van Exel (13)	Great Western Forum; 17,505	42–21
64	March 16	Toronto	W 98-90 (OT)	Eddie Jones (27)	Jerome Kersey (11)	Nick Van Exel (8)	Great Western Forum; 16,839	43–21
65	March 17	@ Denver	W 113-94	Nick Van Exel (30)	Blount & Campbell (10)	Nick Van Exel (9)	McNichols Sports Arena; 13,817	44–21
66	March 20	@ Cleveland	W 89-76	Eddie Jones (25)	Corie Blount (12)	Nick Van Exel (7)	Gund Arena; 18,818	45–21
67	March 21	@ Miami	L 97-98	Elden Campbell (24)	Elden Campbell (12)	Nick Van Exel (11)	Miami Arena; 15,200	45–22
68	March 23	@ Orlando	L 84-110	Elden Campbell (16)	Blount & Kersey (8)	Nick Van Exel (6)	Orlando Arena; 17,248	45–23
69	March 24	@ New Jersey	W 109-84	Nick Van Exel (23)	Travis Knight (14)	Nick Van Exel (8)	Continental Airlines Arena; 20,049	46–23
70	March 26	Milwaukee	W 106-84	Elden Campbell (31)	Corie Blount (14)	3 players tied (4)	Great Western Forum; 17,505	47–23
71	March 27	@ Vancouver	W 102-98 (OT)	Elden Campbell (25)	Elden Campbell (9)	Nick Van Exel (8)	General Motors Place; 18,722	48–23

April: 8–3 (home: 5–1; road: 3–2)

Game	Date	Team	Score	High points	High rebounds	High assists	Location Attendance	Record
72	April 1	@ Seattle	W 99-97	Nick Van Exel (30)	Blount & Kersey (11)	Nick Van Exel (6)	KeyArena; 17,072	49–23
73	April 2	Denver	W 110-85	Eddie Jones (27)	Corie Blount (13)	Nick Van Exel (12)	Great Western Forum; 17,141	50–23
74	April 4	San Antonio	L 83-94	Sean Rooks (20)	Corie Blount (13)	Nick Van Exel (5)	Great Western Forum; 17,505	50–24
75	April 6	Dallas	W 87-80	Derek Fisher (21)	Sean Rooks (11)	3 players tied (5)	Great Western Forum; 17,364	51–24
76	April 8	@ Golden State	W 109-85	Kobe Bryant (24)	Knight & Rooks (7)	Derek Fisher (6)	San Jose Arena; 17,973	52–24
77	April 9	@ Utah	L 89-101	Eddie Jones (16)	Elden Campbell (11)	Derek Fisher (4)	Delta Center; 19,911	52–25
78	April 11	Phoenix	W 114-98	O'Neal & Van Exel (24)	Horry & O'Neal (11)	Nick Van Exel (9)	Great Western Forum; 17,505	53–25
79	April 13	Utah	W 100-98	Shaquille O'Neal (39)	Shaquille O'Neal (13)	Nick Van Exel (7)	Great Western Forum; 17,505	54–25
80	April 17	Sacramento	W 108-99	Shaquille O'Neal (42)	Shaquille O'Neal (12)	Nick Van Exel (7)	Great Western Forum; 17,505	55–25
81	April 18	@ L.A. Clippers	W 123-95	Elden Campbell (21)	Travis Knight (9)	Nick Van Exel (10)	Los Angeles Memorial Sports Arena; 16,094	56–25
82	April 20	@ Portland	L 96-100	Elden Campbell (29)	Elden Campbell (11)	Nick Van Exel (8)	Rose Garden; 21,538	56–26

1996–97 schedule

=== Playoffs ===
1997 playoff game log
Total: 4–5 (home: 3–1; road: 1–4)
First round: 3–1 (home: 2–0; road: 1–1)

Game	Date	Team	Score	High points	High rebounds	High assists	Location Attendance	Series
1	April 25	Portland	W 95–77	Shaquille O'Neal (46)	Shaquille O'Neal (11)	Nick Van Exel (8)	Great Western Forum; 17,505	1–0
2	April 27	Portland	W 107–93	Shaquille O'Neal (30)	Eddie Jones (7)	Nick Van Exel (9)	Great Western Forum; 17,505	2–0
3	April 30	@ Portland	L 90–98	Shaquille O'Neal (29)	Shaquille O'Neal (12)	O'Neal & Van Exel (4)	Rose Garden; 21,538	2–1
4	May 2	@ Portland	W 95–91	Campbell & O'Neal (27)	4 players tied (8)	Jones & Van Exel (5)	Rose Garden; 21,538	3–1

Conference Semi-finals: 1–4 (home: 1–1; road: 0–3)

Game	Date	Team	Score	High points	High rebounds	High assists	Location Attendance	Series
1	May 4	@ Utah	L 77–93	Nick Van Exel (23)	Shaquille O'Neal (12)	Nick Van Exel (4)	Delta Center; 19,911	0–1
2	May 6	@ Utah	L 101–103	Shaquille O'Neal (25)	Shaquille O'Neal (12)	Nick Van Exel (12)	Delta Center; 19,911	0–2
3	May 8	Utah	W 104–84	Kobe Bryant (19)	Shaquille O'Neal (10)	Nick Van Exel (5)	Great Western Forum; 17,505	1–2
4	May 10	Utah	L 95–110	Shaquille O'Neal (34)	Shaquille O'Neal (11)	Nick Van Exel (7)	Great Western Forum; 17,505	1–3
5	May 12	@ Utah	L 93–98 (OT)	Nick Van Exel (26)	Shaquille O'Neal (13)	Shaquille O'Neal (5)	Delta Center; 19,911	1–4

1997 schedule

== Player statistics ==
Legend
GP	Games played	GS	Games started	MPG	Minutes per game
FG%	Field-goal percentage	3P%	3-point field-goal percentage	FT%	Free-throw percentage
RPG	Rebounds per game	APG	Assists per game	SPG	Steals per game
BPG	Blocks per game	PPG	Points per game

=== Regular season ===
Player	GP	GS	MPG	FG%	3FG%	FT%	RPG	APG	SPG	BPG	PPG
Shaquille O'Neal	51	51	38.1	.557	.000	.484	12.5	3.1	0.9	2.9	26.2
Eddie Jones	80	80	37.5	.438	.391	.819	4.1	3.4	2.4	0.6	17.2
Nick Van Exel	79	79	37.2	.402	.378	.825	2.9	8.5	0.9	0.1	15.3
Cedric Ceballos	8	8	34.9	.410	.238	.867	6.6	1.9	0.6	0.8	10.8
Elden Campbell	77	77	32.7	.469	.250	.711	8.0	1.6	0.6	1.5	14.9
Robert Horry	22	14	30.7	.455	.329	.700	5.4	2.5	1.7	1.3	9.2
Jerome Kersey	70	44	25.2	.432	.262	.602	5.2	1.3	1.7	0.7	6.8
Byron Scott	79	8	18.2	.430	.388	.841	1.5	1.3	0.6	0.2	6.7
Corie Blount	58	18	17.4	.514	.333	.675	4.8	0.6	0.4	0.4	4.2
Travis Knight	71	14	16.3	.509	-	.620	4.5	0.5	0.4	0.8	4.8
Kobe Bryant	71	6	15.5	.417	.375	.819	1.9	1.3	0.7	0.3	7.6
George McCloud	23	2	12.4	.354	.429	.667	1.6	0.7	0.4	0.0	4.1
Derek Fisher	80	3	11.5	.397	.301	.658	1.2	1.5	0.5	0.1	3.9
Sean Rooks	69	3	10.7	.470	.000	.700	2.4	0.6	0.2	0.6	3.8

=== Playoffs ===
Player	GP	GS	MPG	FG%	3FG%	FT%	RPG	APG	SPG	BPG	PPG
Corie Blount	3	0	2.7	1.000		.500	.7	.3	.0	.0	1.0
Kobe Bryant	9	0	14.8	.382	.261	.867	1.2	1.2	.3	.2	8.2
Elden Campbell	9	9	30.9	.398	1.000	.816	4.3	1.0	.8	1.4	11.8
Derek Fisher	6	0	5.7	.273	.000	.667	.5	1.0	.2	.0	1.3
Robert Horry	9	9	31.0	.447	.429	.778	5.3	1.4	1.1	.8	6.7
Eddie Jones	9	9	31.4	.458	.375	.743	3.4	3.2	1.0	.4	11.2
Jerome Kersey	9	0	23.3	.486	.000	.789	5.3	1.6	1.0	.7	5.4
Travis Knight	9	0	10.3	.800		.750	2.0	.3	.3	.3	2.1
Shaquille O'Neal	9	9	36.2	.514		.610	10.6	3.2	.6	1.9	26.9
Sean Rooks	8	0	6.8	.444		.750	1.5	.1	.4	.4	1.8
Byron Scott	8	0	16.8	.455	.364	.895	1.5	1.4	.1	.0	6.4
Nick Van Exel	9	9	39.2	.378	.273	.824	3.4	6.4	1.1	.0	14.4

Player statistics citation:

== Awards and records ==
- Shaquille O'Neal, 1997 Kids' Choice Awards Favorite Male Athlete
- Shaquille O'Neal, All-NBA Third Team
- Kobe Bryant, NBA All-Rookie Team 2nd Team
- Travis Knight, NBA All-Rookie Team 2nd Team
