= Travis Knight (basketball) =

American basketball player

Personal information
- Born: September 13, 1974 (age 52) Salt Lake City, Utah, U.S.
- Listed height: 7 ft 0 in (2.13 m)
- Listed weight: 235 lb (107 kg)

Career information
- High school: Alta (Sandy, Utah)
- College: UConn (1992–1996)
- NBA draft: 1996: 1st round, 29th overall pick
- Drafted by: Chicago Bulls
- Playing career: 1996–2003
- Position: Center
- Number: 40, 44

Career history
- 1996–1997: Los Angeles Lakers
- 1997–1998: Boston Celtics
- 1999–2000: Los Angeles Lakers
- 2000–2003: New York Knicks

Career highlights
- NBA champion (2000); NBA All-Rookie Second Team (1997)

Career NBA statistics
- Points: 1,276 (3.4 ppg)
- Rebounds: 1,160 (3.1 rpg)
- Blocks: 221 (0.6 bpg)
- Stats at NBA.com
- Stats at Basketball Reference

Travis Knight (born September 13, 1974) is an American former professional basketball player who played seven seasons in the National Basketball Association (NBA). A 7'0" center from the University of Connecticut, he played under Hall of Fame head coach Jim Calhoun.

== Career ==
Knight was drafted with the 29th overall pick of the 1996 NBA draft by the Chicago Bulls. In July 1996, less than a month after drafting Knight, the Bulls renounced the rights to sign Knight rather than give him the required three-year contract for first-round picks. He then signed with the Los Angeles Lakers.

After playing in 71 games with the Lakers, which included 14 starts, an appearance in the rookie all-star game and averages of 4.8 points and 4.5 rebounds in 16.3 minutes per game, Knight was once again a free agent and signed a 7-year contract worth $22 million with the Boston Celtics under new coach and general manager Rick Pitino. Upon signing the deal, Knight said, "I really have mixed emotions; I should be elated right now, but I'm not. I feel so much loyalty [to the Lakers]". After one season in which he averaged 6.5 points over 71 games with the Celtics, Knight was traded back to the Lakers for Tony Battie. He won a championship as a role player with the Lakers in 2000, averaging 1.6 points per game in 6.3 minutes in 71 games. In September 2000, Knight was sent to the New York Knicks as part of a four-team trade which sent Patrick Ewing to the Seattle SuperSonics. Knight played his final 3 NBA seasons in New York; he averaged between 5.7 and 9 minutes per game over those seasons and never more than 2 points per game as a bench player. He left the NBA in 2003 when the initial contract he signed in 1996 expired.

Overall, Knight played in 7 NBA seasons from 1996 to 2003, appeared in 371 games over that time and scored a total of 1,276 points. He holds the NBA Playoff record for quickest disqualification, having fouled out in six minutes in game 4 of the 1999 Western Conference semi-finals.

== Personal life ==
Knight is married to April Cowgill. Together they have two children, Lyric and Phoenix Knight. He also has two daughters, Natasha and Skylar, from two previous relationships.

== Career statistics ==
Legend
| GP | Games played | GS | Games started | MPG | Minutes per game |
| FG% | Field goal percentage | 3P% | 3-point field goal percentage | FT% | Free throw percentage |
| RPG | Rebounds per game | APG | Assists per game | SPG | Steals per game |
| BPG | Blocks per game | PPG | Points per game | **Bold** | Career high |
| † | Won an NBA championship |

=== NBA ===
==== Regular season ====
| Year | Team | GP | GS | MPG | FG% | 3P% | FT% | RPG | APG | SPG | BPG | PPG |
|---|---|---|---|---|---|---|---|---|---|---|---|---|
| 1996–97 | L.A. Lakers | 71 | 14 | 16.3 | .509 | – | .620 | 4.5 | .5 | .4 | .8 | 4.8 |
| 1997–98 | Boston | **74** | 21 | **20.3** | .441 | **.273** | **.786** | **4.9** | **1.4** | **.7** | **1.1** | **6.5** |
| 1998–99 | L.A. Lakers | 37 | **23** | 14.2 | **.515** | .000 | .759 | 3.5 | .8 | .6 | .7 | 4.2 |
| 1999–00† | L.A. Lakers | 65 | 0 | 6.5 | .390 | – | .607 | 2.0 | .4 | .1 | .4 | 1.7 |
| 2000–01 | New York | 45 | 0 | 5.7 | .189 | .000 | .500 | 1.2 | .1 | .1 | .2 | .6 |
| 2001–02 | New York | 49 | 0 | 8.8 | .363 | – | .762 | 2.1 | .2 | .2 | .2 | 2.0 |
| 2002–03 | New York | 32 | 0 | 9.0 | .385 | .000 | .769 | 1.9 | .4 | .3 | .3 | 1.9 |
| Career | | 371 | 58 | 12.3 | .438 | .259 | .696 | 3.1 | .6 | .4 | .6 | 3.4 |

==== Playoffs ====
| Year | Team | GP | GS | MPG | FG% | 3P% | FT% | RPG | APG | SPG | BPG | PPG |
|---|---|---|---|---|---|---|---|---|---|---|---|---|
| 1997 | L.A. Lakers | 9 | 0 | **10.3** | **.800** | – | **.750** | **2.0** | **.3** | **.3** | **.3** | **2.1** |
| 1999 | L.A. Lakers | 3 | 0 | 3.3 | .333 | – | .500 | 1.7 | **.3** | .0 | .0 | 1.0 |
| 2000† | L.A. Lakers | **14** | 0 | 3.4 | .533 | – | .333 | .4 | .0 | .1 | .2 | 1.3 |
| 2001 | New York | 1 | 0 | 1.0 | – | – | – | .0 | .0 | .0 | .0 | .0 |
| Career | | 27 | 0 | 5.6 | .607 | – | .500 | 1.0 | .1 | .1 | .2 | 1.5 |
