= 1999–2000 Los Angeles Lakers season =

Season of National Basketball Association team the Los Angeles Lakers

- NBA champions
- Conference champions
- Division champions
- Head coach: Phil Jackson
- General manager: Jerry West
- Owner: Jerry Buss
- Arena: Staples Center

Results
- Record: 67–15 (.817)
- Place: Division: 1st (Pacific); Conference: 1st (Western)
- Playoff finish: NBA champions (Defeated Pacers 4–2)
- Stats at Basketball Reference

Local media
- Television: KCAL-TV; Fox Sports West (Chick Hearn, Stu Lantz)
- Radio: KLAC (Chick Hearn, Stu Lantz)

The 1999–2000 Los Angeles Lakers season was the 52nd season for the Los Angeles Lakers in the National Basketball Association, and their 40th season in Los Angeles, California.

== Season summary ==
=== Off-season ===
The Lakers moved into their new arena known as the Staples Center, becoming co-tenants with their crosstown rival, the Los Angeles Clippers.

During the off-season, the team re-acquired former Lakers forward A.C. Green from the Dallas Mavericks, and signed free agents Ron Harper, Brian Shaw and John Salley; Green won two championships with the Lakers in the 1980s, and Salley won three championships with the Detroit Pistons and the Chicago Bulls. More significantly, the Lakers hired former Bulls coach Phil Jackson as their new head coach; Jackson would go on to help the team win five NBA championships over the course of the next twelve years.

For the season, the Lakers slightly updated their primary logo of a golden yellow basketball with a black outline, changing the city and team name from periwinkle to purple. The team also redesigned their home and road uniforms, adding side panels to their jerseys and shorts; the golden yellow home uniforms featured a purple trim, and purple side panels with white and purple outlines, while the purple road uniforms featured a golden yellow trim, and golden yellow side panels with white and golden yellow outlines. The team's new primary logo would remain in use until 2017, while the new uniforms would last until 2004, where they would slightly change their jerseys by adding the secondary logo to their shorts.

=== Regular season ===
Under Jackson and with the addition of Harper, Green and Shaw, the Lakers got off to an 8–4 start to the regular season. The team posted a seven-game winning streak between November and December afterwards, then posted a 16-game winning streak between December and January, and later on held a 37–11 record at the All-Star break. The Lakers posted a 19-game winning streak between February and March, and then posted an 11-game winning streak between March and April. The Lakers finished in first place in the Pacific Division with a league-best 67–15 record, earning the first seed in the Western Conference, and in the NBA playoffs for the 25th time in franchise history; the team's 67 wins were the most wins since the 1971–72 team won a franchise-record of 69 games. The Lakers qualified for the playoffs for the sixth consecutive year.

Shaquille O'Neal averaged 29.7 points, 13.6 rebounds, 3.8 assists and 3.0 blocks per game, and was almost unanimously named the NBA Most Valuable Player of the Year, and was also named to the All-NBA First Team, and to the NBA All-Defensive Second Team; O'Neal received 120 out of 121 first-place votes from the media in MVP voting, as the only person who did not vote for him was CNN sports broadcaster Fred Hickman, who instead voted for Allen Iverson of the Philadelphia 76ers. In addition, Kobe Bryant averaged 22.5 points, 6.3 rebounds and 4.9 assists per game, and was named to the All-NBA Second Team, and to the NBA All-Defensive First Team, while Glen Rice finished third on the team in scoring averaging 15.9 points per game. Meanwhile, Harper provided the team with 7.0 points and 3.4 assists per game, Rick Fox contributed 6.5 points per game, and Derek Fisher provided with 6.3 points and 2.8 assists per game, but only shot .346 in field-goal percentage. On the defensive side, Robert Horry averaged 5.7 points and 4.8 rebounds per game, and Green contributed 5.0 points and 5.9 rebounds per game.

During the NBA All-Star weekend at The Arena in Oakland in Oakland, California, O'Neal and Bryant were both selected for the 2000 NBA All-Star Game, as members of the Western Conference All-Star team, while Jackson was selected to coach the Western Conference. O'Neal scored 22 points along with 9 rebounds and 3 blocks, as he and Tim Duncan of the San Antonio Spurs both shared the NBA All-Star Game Most Valuable Player award, as the Western Conference defeated the Eastern Conference, 137–126. Meanwhile, Fisher participated in the NBA 2Ball Competition, along with Lisa Leslie of the WNBA's Los Angeles Sparks.

Bryant also finished in twelfth place in Most Valuable Player voting, while O'Neal finished in second place in Defensive Player of the Year voting, behind Alonzo Mourning of the Miami Heat, and with Bryant finishing tied in fifth place; in addition, both O'Neal and Bryant also finished in Most Improved Player voting, finishing in tenth and tied in eleventh place respectively, and Jackson finished in second place in Coach of the Year voting behind Doc Rivers of the Orlando Magic, despite the Magic missing the playoffs with a 41–41 record. The Lakers had the best team defensive rating in the NBA.

The Lakers finished seventh in the NBA in home-game attendance, with an attendance of 771,420 at the Staples Center during the regular season.

=== NBA playoffs ===
In the Western Conference First Round of the 2000 NBA playoffs, the Lakers faced off against the 8th–seeded Sacramento Kings, a team that featured All-Star forward Chris Webber, second-year star Jason Williams, and former Lakers center Vlade Divac. The Lakers won the first two games over the Kings at home at the Staples Center, before losing the next two games on the road, which included a Game 4 loss to the Kings at the ARCO Arena II, 101–88. With the series tied at 2–2, the Lakers won Game 5 over the Kings at the Staples Center, 113–86 to win in a hard-fought five-game series.

In the Western Conference Semi-finals, the team faced off against the 5th–seeded Phoenix Suns, a team that featured Clifford Robinson, Penny Hardaway, and All-Star guard Jason Kidd; Hardaway was O'Neal's former teammate on the Orlando Magic. The Lakers won the first three games to take a 3–0 series lead, but then lost Game 4 to the Suns on the road, 117–98 at the America West Arena. The Lakers won Game 5 over the Suns at the Staples Center, 87–65 to win the series in five games.

In the Western Conference Finals, the Lakers then faced off against the 3rd–seeded Portland Trail Blazers, who were led by All-Star forward Rasheed Wallace, Scottie Pippen and Steve Smith. With the series tied at 1–1, the Lakers won the next two games over the Trail Blazers on the road, including a Game 4 win at the Rose Garden Arena, 103–91. However, the Trail Blazers managed to win the next two games, which included a Game 6 win over the Lakers at the Rose Garden Arena, 103–93 to even the series. The Lakers won Game 7 over the Trail Blazers at the Staples Center, 89–84 to win in a hard-fought seven-game series, and advance to the NBA Finals for the first time since the 1990–91 season.

In the 2000 NBA Finals, the Lakers faced off against the top–seeded Indiana Pacers, who were led by Most Improved Player of the Year, Jalen Rose, All-Star guard Reggie Miller, and All-Star forward Dale Davis. The Lakers won the first two games over the Pacers at the Staples Center, before losing Game 3 on the road, 100–91 at Conseco Fieldhouse. The Lakers managed to win Game 4 on the road in overtime, 120–118, but then lost Game 5 to the Pacers at the Conseco Fieldhouse, 120–87. The Lakers won Game 6 over the Pacers at the Staples Center, 116–111 to win the series in six games, and earning the franchise its twelfth NBA championship, as O'Neal was named the NBA Finals Most Valuable Player; it was the first of the Lakers' three-peat championships to begin the millennium, and the franchise's first championship since 1988. The championship win was also Jackson's seventh championship as a head coach, and the first with a team besides the Chicago Bulls.

=== Aftermath ===
Following the season, Rice and Travis Knight were both traded to the New York Knicks in a four-team trade, while Green signed as a free agent with the Miami Heat, and Salley retired after making a comeback to the NBA.

Because of their dominant regular and postseason performance, as well as O'Neal and Bryant's individual achievements, this Los Angeles Lakers team is widely regarded as one of the greatest teams in NBA history. A documentary miniseries, Birth of a Dynasty, based on this Lakers season, was released in late 2019.

== Draft picks ==
Round	Pick	Player	Position	Nationality	College
1	23	Devean George	SF	United States	Augsburg
2	30	John Celestand	PG	United States	Villanova

== Roster ==
1999–2000 Los Angeles Lakers roster
Players

Pos.	No.	Player	Height	Weight	DOB	From
SG	8	Kobe Bryant	6 ft 6 in (1.98 m)	205 lb (93 kg)	1978–08–23	Lower Merion HS
PG	11	John Celestand	6 ft 4 in (1.93 m)	178 lb (81 kg)	1977–03–06	Villanova
PG	2	Derek Fisher	6 ft 1 in (1.85 m)	210 lb (95 kg)	1974–08–09	Little Rock
SF	17	Rick Fox	6 ft 7 in (2.01 m)	230 lb (104 kg)	1969–07–24	North Carolina
SF	3	Devean George	6 ft 8 in (2.03 m)	235 lb (107 kg)	1977–08–29	Augsburg
PF	45	A.C. Green	6 ft 9 in (2.06 m)	220 lb (100 kg)	1963–10–04	Oregon State
PG	4	Ron Harper	6 ft 6 in (1.98 m)	185 lb (84 kg)	1964–01–20	Miami (OH)
PF	5	Robert Horry	6 ft 10 in (2.08 m)	240 lb (109 kg)	1970–08–25	Alabama
C	40	Travis Knight	6 ft 10 in (2.08 m)	235 lb (107 kg)	1974–09–13	Connecticut
PG	10	Tyronn Lue	6 ft 0 in (1.83 m)	175 lb (79 kg)	1977–05–03	Nebraska
C	34	Shaquille O'Neal	7 ft 1 in (2.16 m)	340 lb (154 kg)	1972–03–06	LSU
SF	41	Glen Rice	6 ft 7 in (2.01 m)	215 lb (98 kg)	1967–05–28	Michigan
C	16	John Salley	6 ft 11 in (2.11 m)	190 lb (86 kg)	1964–05–16	Georgia Tech
SG	20	Brian Shaw	6 ft 6 in (1.98 m)	190 lb (86 kg)	1966–03–22	UC Santa Barbara

Coaches
Head coach
- Phil Jackson
Assistant(s)
- Bill Bertka
- Jim Cleamons
- Frank Hamblen
- Tex Winter

Legend
- (DP) Unsigned draft pick
- (FA) Free agent
- (S) Suspended
- Injured

Roster
Updated: November 12, 1999

== Regular season ==
=== Season standings ===
Pacific Division	W	L	PCT	GB	Home	Road	Div
y-Los Angeles Lakers	67	15	.817	–	36–5	31–10	20–4
x-Portland Trail Blazers	59	23	.720	8	30–11	29–12	21–3
x-Phoenix Suns	53	29	.646	14	32–9	21–20	15–9
x-Seattle SuperSonics	45	37	.549	22	24–17	21–20	12–12
x-Sacramento Kings	44	38	.537	23	30–11	14–27	9–15
Golden State Warriors	19	63	.232	48	12–29	7–34	2–22
Los Angeles Clippers	15	67	.183	52	10–31	5–36	5–19

#	Western Conference				
#	Team	W	L	PCT	GB
1	z-Los Angeles Lakers	67	15	.817	–
2	y-Utah Jazz	55	27	.671	12
3	x-Portland Trail Blazers	59	23	.720	8
4	x-San Antonio Spurs	53	29	.646	14
5	x-Phoenix Suns	53	29	.646	14
6	x-Minnesota Timberwolves	50	32	.610	17
7	x-Seattle SuperSonics	45	37	.549	22
8	x-Sacramento Kings	44	38	.537	23
9	Dallas Mavericks	40	42	.488	27
10	Denver Nuggets	35	47	.427	32
11	Houston Rockets	34	48	.415	33
12	Vancouver Grizzlies	22	60	.268	45
13	Golden State Warriors	19	63	.232	48
14	Los Angeles Clippers	15	67	.183	52

== Regular season summary ==
The Lakers went 31-19 during the shortened lockout season of 1998–99, good enough to claim the fourth spot of the Western Conference. They cruised past the Rockets on the first round, before bowing down to the eventual champions, the Spurs.

The Lakers started their season without Kobe Bryant, who missed the first month of the regular season due to a preseason hand injury, so Phil Jackson used veteran forwards such as A.C. Green and Glen Rice to fill the void left by Bryant.

=== November ===
On November 2, 1999, the Lakers started their season with a 91–84 win on the road against the Utah Jazz. Glen Rice led the Lakers with 28 points to go along with 5 3-pointers made. The very next day, the Lakers got their first win at home after defeating the visiting Vancouver Grizzlies, 103–88, behind Shaquille O'Neal's double-double performance of 28 points and 10 rebounds. It was also the first time that the Lakers played in STAPLES Center. Their first loss of the season came on November 6 when the Lakers were defeated by the home team, Portland Trail Blazers, led by Scottie Pippen. In that game, Shaquille O'Neal led both teams in scoring as he scored 21 points to go along with 10 rebounds and 2 blocks. The next two games, the Lakers were pitted against the Dallas Mavericks led by rising stars Steve Nash and Dirk Nowitzki. They played first at the Lakers homecourt then the next game, on the Mavericks homecourt. However, they were no match for the dominance of O'Neal who averaged 28.5 points per game, 15.0 rebounds per game and 2 blocks per game in those two contests. The Lakers will face the Houston Rockets the next two games, this time, they will face the Rockets first on the road before going home to face the Rockets there. During their first meeting on November 10, the Lakers were pushed to the limit for Shaquille O'Neal was fouled out in the game. He just played 16 minutes for the entire game. However, the Rockets were not able to capitalize the opportunity as the veterans of the Lakers led by Glen Rice's 24 points, powered the Lakers towards their 5th win of the season. They match-up against each other again two days after, but without O'Neal who was suspended, they bowed to the visiting Rockets, 81–97, who was led by Hakeem Olajuwon and Steve Francis. Two days after, the Lakers bounced back because O'Neal was back who dominated the whole game against the visiting Atlanta Hawks. O'Neal recorded 23 points, 11 rebounds, 3 assists and 3 blocks as he led the Lakers towards the win. The Lakers, led by the strong performance of O'Neal, overpowered the home team, Phoenix Suns, who were led by Jason Kidd and former Bulls player, Luc Longley, 91–82. O'Neal recorded 34 points, 18 rebounds, 4 assists and 8 blocks for the Lakers. On November 18, the Lakers were up against the Nick Van Exel-led Nuggets. Van Exel was the former point guard of the Lakers. During the first half, the Lakers were up 42–39. However, the Nuggets stormed back as they got the win, 93–82. It was the Lakers' third loss of the season. Shaquille O'Neal led all scorers with 36 points to go along with 8 rebounds. The Lakers next faced the Chicago Bulls. O'Neal led the Lakers towards their eighth win of the season as they defeat the visiting Bulls, 103–95. O'Neal recorded 41 points, 17 rebounds and 7 blocks. On November 21, the Lakers were up against the Vince Carter-led Toronto Raptors. However, Vince Carter scored 34 points to go along with 13 rebounds as the Raptors take the win in STAPLES Center, 111–102, to give the Lakers their fourth loss of the season. For the Lakers, O'Neal was again the leading scorer with 37 points to go along with 19 rebounds. On their last game for the month in November, the Lakers traveled on the road to match-up against the Gary Payton-led Seattle Supersonics. However, the Lakers just proved too much to be handled as they dispatched the Supersonics, 101–77. They finished the month of November with an 11–4 record.

=== December ===
On December 1, 1999, Kobe Bryant was back from almost a month of not playing due to injury, and this time, they were up against the 2-11 Golden State Warriors. Bryant came off the bench to play almost 30 minutes and scored 19 points and grabbed 6 rebounds. O'Neal also contributed 28 points and 23 rebounds as they got the 12th win of the season. Six days later, the Lakers won their 15th game of the season, led by Shaquille O'Neal who recorded 30 points, 16 rebounds and 7 blocks, in a 91–80 win over the visiting Washington Wizards. On December 12, Kobe Bryant scored 26 points and Shaquille O'Neal contributed 22 points and 24 rebounds as the Lakers won their 17th win of the season after beating the visiting Detroit Pistons, 101–93. Two days after, Phil Jackson re-inserted Kobe Bryant into the startling lineup for the first time this season. And now, the Lakers were up against their division rivals, the L.A. Clippers. O'Neal recorded 21 points, 19 rebounds and 3 blocks and Bryant added 18 points as the Lakers dismissed the Clippers, 95–68. On December 17, the Lakers won their fifth straight game as they won on the road against the Timberwolves, 97–88. Kobe Bryant paved the way with 28 points, 7 rebounds and 12 assists. Three days later, Shaquille O'Neal recorded 34 points, 20 rebounds and 2 blocks in a 99–90 win over the home team, Boston Celtics, for the seventh straight win. The next game, the Lakers were visited by the defending champions, the San Antonio Spurs who were led by the "Twin Towers" of Tim Duncan and David Robinson for a Christmas showdown. At halftime, the Lakers led the Spurs, 50–42, before the Spurs surged in the third quarter, outscoring the Lakers, 25–21, cutting the lead to four. However, the Lakers responded in the fourth quarter as they pulled away and won their eighth straight game. Shaquille O'Neal recorded 35 points and 14 rebounds as the Lakers took a narrow win over the visiting Mavericks, 108–106. On their last game of the century and year 1999, the Lakers won their tenth straight game, after defeating the visiting Suns, 103–88, thanks to Shaquille O'Neal's performance of 27 points, 19 rebounds, 7 assists and 5 blocks. For the month of December, the Lakers have a record of 14–1, and they went undefeated at their homecourt.

=== January ===
In the first two games of the 21st century (year 2000), the Lakers were up against the Clippers, whom they defeated both games. In the second game, O'Neal recorded 40 points and 19 rebounds for the Lakers. On January 10, Bryant and O'Neal combined for 61 of the 130 points of the Lakers whom they guided towards a win over the visiting Nuggets. It was their 15th straight win The next game, they traveled in Milwaukee in which they recorded their 16th straight win after beating the Bucks, 103–94. Their 16-game winning streak came to an end when the Reggie Miller-led Indiana Pacers beat the Lakers, 111–102. It was their sixth loss of the season. Their seventh loss came against the Seattle Supersonics wherein Gary Payton led the Supersonics towards the win. Following their loss against the Supersonics, in the next 6 games, they have a record of 2 wins and 4 losses, and 3 of the 4 losses came on the road. Their last win for the month of January happened on January 28 wherein the Lakers defeated the visiting Bucks, 117–89.

=== February ===
They started the month of February with an 81–105 loss to the defending champions, San Antonio Spurs. The "Twin Towers" proved too much for the Lakers. O'Neal led the Lakers in scoring with 31 points. The next game, the Lakers blows out the visiting Utah Jazz, 113–67. Shaquille O'Neal recorded 25 points, 6 rebounds and 5 blocks to lead the Lakers. It was the tied for the sixth highest point differential in Lakers franchise history. On February 9, the Lakers had another blowout win, this time against the visiting Timberwolves. O'Neal recorded 37 points, 16 rebounds and 4 blocks as the Lakers won 114–81. On February 20, the Lakers escaped the Allen Iverson-led 76ers on the road, 87–84, thus winning their seventh straight game. O'Neal once again led the Lakers with 22 points, 16 rebounds, 9 assists and 4 blocks. During their last game of February, O'Neal and Bryant recorded 55 points of the 90 Laker points as they led the Lakers towards their 12th straight win, escaping the home team, Portland Trail Blazers, 90–87. They ended the month of February with a record of 12–1.

=== March ===
On March 1, the Lakers defeated the visiting Vancouver Grizzlies, 103–91, thus winning their 13th straight win. Kobe Bryant led the Lakers in scoring with 27 points to go along with 6 rebounds and 3 assists. Five days later, the Lakers were up against the Clippers, and they won their 16th straight win, 123–103. O'Neal recorded a career-high 61 points to go along with 23 rebounds and 3 assists for the Lakers. They also have won their 50th game of the season. Three days after, Bryant and O'Neal combined for 59 points as they defeated the home team, Golden State Warriors, 109–92, to extend their winning streak to 17 in a row. With that win, the Lakers now have their second longest winning streak in franchise history, after beating their winning streak earlier in the season when they won 16 in a row. They also won 16 in a row back in January to February 1991. On March 12, their winning streak were nearly snapped as they overcame a 12-point deficit against the visiting Sacramento Kings. The Lakers won 109–106. Bryant recorded 40 points, 10 rebounds and 8 assists and O'Neal added 39 points, 20 rebounds and 5 assists. The very next day, O'Neal, Bryant and Rice combined for 82 points as they extend their winning streak to 19 games as they defeat the home team, the Denver Nuggets, 118–108. Their 19-game winning streak was the longest in the NBA for four years when the 1995-96 Bulls won 18 in a row. Their 19-game winning streak ended when they were defeated by the home team, Washington Wizards, 102–109, despite O'Neal's 40 points and 12 rebounds for the Lakers. They got back in the winning column, as they blown out the home team, the Detroit Pistons, 110–82. In that game, they've won their 54th game of the season. O'Neal led the Lakers with 35 points and 11 rebounds. O'Neal again led the Lakers as he recorded 43 points and 10 rebounds as they won again, 92–85, against the home team, New York Knicks. On March 20, O'Neal and Rice combined for 56 of the 100 Lakers points as they got the road win in Miami, 100–89. Bryant also added 23 points and 5 rebounds for the Lakers. On March 26, in a road game against the Sacramento Kings, the Kings jumped out on an early lead, leading the Lakers 50–47 by the end of the first half. However, the Lakers outscored the Kings, 43–37, in the second half, thus winning the game, 90–89. The Lakers now have won their sixth straight game. In their last game for the month of March, the Lakers defeated the visiting 76ers, 100–88. O'Neal led the Lakers with 37 points, 14 rebounds, 5 assists and 8 blocks. The Lakers now have won their 61st game of the season, the first time they have won over 61 games for over a decade. They ended the month of March with a 15–1 win record, only losing to the Washington Wizards.

=== April ===
Their first game on April was against the visiting Knicks. O'Neal led the Lakers with 34 points, 12 rebounds, 4 assists and 5 blocks as the Lakers captured their 62nd win of the season, 106–82. On April 5, O'Neal recorded 49 points and 13 rebounds as the Lakers recorded their 64th win of the season as they won on the road, 111–104, against the home team, Golden State Warriors. On April 10, the Lakers captured their 65th win of the season, behind Kobe Bryant's 33 points, 10 rebounds and 6 assist performance for the Lakers, as they escaped the visiting SuperSonics, 106–103. Their 65 wins have matched their 2nd highest win total for a single season in franchise history, matching the 1986-87 Lakers season. Their 67th win of the season came in a 101–95 win over the visiting Timberwolves. O'Neal once again led the Lakers with 33 points, 14 rebounds and 8 assists.

== Game log ==
=== Pre-season ===
1999 preseason game log
Total: 3–5
Preseason

Game	Date	Team	Score	High points	High rebounds	High assists	Location Attendance	Record
	October 12	Washington	Cancelled (stadium structural stability concerns)				Alltel Arena (Little Rock, AR)	0-0
1	October 13	Washington	L 84-88	Shaquille O'Neal (22)	Shaquille O'Neal (14)	Kobe Bryant (5)	Kemper Arena (Kansas City, MO); 14,211	0–1
2	October 19	Golden State	W 97-90	Shaquille O'Neal (19)	O'Neal & Rice (8)	Derek Fisher (9)	San Diego Sports Arena (San Diego, CA); 13,327	1-1
3	October 21	Golden State	W 93-89 (OT)	Shaquille O'Neal (21)	Shaquille O'Neal (15)	Derek Fisher (7)	Great Western Forum; 10,398	2–1
4	October 22	Phoenix	L 100-112	Shaquille O'Neal (37)	Shaquille O'Neal (14)	Derek Fisher (5)	Great Western Forum; 12,510	2-2
5	October 24	Miami	W 97-79	George & O'Neal (14)	Shaquille O'Neal (12)	George & Harper (4)	Centennial Garden (Bakersfield, CA); 9,411	3–2
6	October 25	Portland	L 78-92	Shaquille O'Neal (16)	Shaquille O'Neal (12)	Brian Shaw (3)	University Arena (Albuquerque, NM); 13,150	3-3
7	October 26	Phoenix	L 73-95	Shaquille O'Neal (26)	Shaquille O'Neal (17)	Brian Shaw (5)	Thomas & Mack Center (Las Vegas, NV); 12,128	3–4
8	October 28	Utah	L 76-92	Shaquille O'Neal (31)			Arrowhead Pond (Anaheim, CA); 15,632	3–5

2000 schedule

=== Regular season ===
1999–2000 game log
Total: 67–15 (Home: 36–5; Road: 31–10)
November: 11–4 (home: 6–2; road: 5–2)

Game	Date	Team	Score	High points	High rebounds	High assists	Location Attendance	Record
1	November 2	@ Utah	W 91–84	Glen Rice (28)	Shaquille O'Neal (13)	Derek Fisher (7)	Delta Center; 19,911	1–0
2	November 3	Vancouver	W 103–88	Shaquille O'Neal (28)	Shaquille O'Neal (10)	Derek Fisher (8)	Staples Center; 18,997	2–0
3	November 6	@ Portland	L 82–97	Shaquille O'Neal (21)	Green & O'Neal (10)	Ron Harper (6)	Rose Garden; 20,584	2–1
4	November 7	Dallas	W 105–97	Shaquille O'Neal (30)	Shaquille O'Neal (20)	Derek Fisher (8)	Staples Center; 18,068	3–1
5	November 9	@ Dallas	W 123–101	Shaquille O'Neal (27)	Shaquille O'Neal (10)	Brian Shaw (5)	Reunion Arena; 17,349	4–1
6	November 10	@ Houston	W 89–88	Glen Rice (24)	A.C. Green (12)	Ron Harper (6)	Compaq Center; 16,285	5–1
7	November 12	Houston	L 81–97	Glen Rice (11)	A.C. Green (9)	A.C. Green (4)	Staples Center; 18,359	5–2
8	November 14	Atlanta	W 93–88	Shaquille O'Neal (23)	Shaquille O'Neal (11)	Ron Harper (5)	Staples Center; 18,510	6–2
9	November 15	@ Phoenix	W 91–82	Shaquille O'Neal (34)	Shaquille O'Neal (18)	Harper & O'Neal (4)	America West Arena; 19,023	7–2
10	November 18	@ Denver	L 82–93	Shaquille O'Neal (36)	A.C. Green (9)	Derek Fisher (9)	Pepsi Center; 15,218	7–3
11	November 19	Chicago	W 103–95	Shaquille O'Neal (41)	Shaquille O'Neal (17)	Ron Harper (4)	Staples Center; 18,401	8–3
12	November 21	Toronto	L 102–111	Shaquille O'Neal (37)	Shaquille O'Neal (19)	Fisher & O'Neal (5)	Staples Center; 18,676	8–4
13	November 24	Utah	W 90–82	Shaquille O'Neal (39)	Shaquille O'Neal (18)	Harper & O'Neal (4)	Staples Center; 18,997	9–4
14	November 26	New Jersey	W 103–80	Shaquille O'Neal (30)	Shaquille O'Neal (16)	Shaquille O'Neal (7)	Staples Center; 18,997	10–4
15	November 30	@ Seattle	W 101–77	Shaquille O'Neal (27)	Shaquille O'Neal (10)	Derek Fisher (8)	KeyArena; 17,072	11–4

December: 14–1 (home: 9–0; road: 5–1)

Game	Date	Team	Score	High points	High rebounds	High assists	Location Attendance	Record
16	December 1	Golden State	W 93–75	Shaquille O'Neal (28)	Shaquille O'Neal (23)	Derek Fisher (4)	Staples Center; 17,689	12–4
17	December 3	Portland	W 93–80	Kobe Bryant (23)	Shaquille O'Neal (16)	Shaquille O'Neal (6)	Staples Center; 18,997	13–4
18	December 5	Orlando	W 117–100	Shaquille O'Neal (27)	Shaquille O'Neal (10)	Shaquille O'Neal (7)	Staples Center; 18,422	14–4
19	December 7	Washington	W 91–80	Shaquille O'Neal (30)	Shaquille O'Neal (16)	Ron Harper (7)	Staples Center; 17,571	15–4
20	December 8	@ Sacramento	L 91–103	Bryant & O'Neal (27)	Shaquille O'Neal (9)	Kobe Bryant (5)	ARCO Arena; 17,317	15–5
21	December 11	@ Vancouver	W 106–94	Shaquille O'Neal (30)	Shaquille O'Neal (10)	Kobe Bryant (7)	General Motors Place; 14,059	16–5
22	December 12	Detroit	W 101–93	Kobe Bryant (26)	Shaquille O'Neal (24)	Kobe Bryant (6)	Staples Center; 18,785	17–5
23	December 14	L.A. Clippers	W 95–68	Shaquille O'Neal (21)	Shaquille O'Neal (19)	3 players tied (4)	Staples Center; 18,719	18–5
24	December 16	@ Atlanta	W 95–88	Kobe Bryant (30)	Shaquille O'Neal (13)	O'Neal & Rice (4)	Philips Arena; 19,463	19–5
25	December 17	@ Minnesota	W 97–88	Kobe Bryant (28)	Shaquille O'Neal (13)	Kobe Bryant (12)	Target Center; 19,354	20–5
26	December 19	@ Toronto	W 94–88	Kobe Bryant (26)	Shaquille O'Neal (15)	Glen Rice (4)	Air Canada Centre; 19,800	21–5
27	December 20	@ Boston	W 99–90	Shaquille O'Neal (34)	Shaquille O'Neal (20)	Bryant & Fox (4)	FleetCenter; 18,624	22–5
28	December 25	San Antonio	W 99–93	Shaquille O'Neal (32)	Shaquille O'Neal (11)	3 players tied (5)	Staples Center; 18,997	23–5
29	December 27	Dallas	W 108–106	Shaquille O'Neal (35)	Shaquille O'Neal (14)	Robert Horry (8)	Staples Center; 18,997	24–5
30	December 29	Phoenix	W 103–87	Shaquille O'Neal (27)	Shaquille O'Neal (19)	Shaquille O'Neal (7)	Staples Center; 18,997	25–5

January: 9–5 (home: 5–2; road: 4–3)

Game	Date	Team	Score	High points	High rebounds	High assists	Location Attendance	Record
31	January 4	@ L.A. Clippers	W 122–98	Shaquille O'Neal (38)	Shaquille O'Neal (15)	Brian Shaw (7)	Staples Center; 20,042	26–5
32	January 5	L.A. Clippers	W 118–101	Shaquille O'Neal (40)	Shaquille O'Neal (19)	Brian Shaw (8)	Staples Center; 18,788	27–5
33	January 7	Charlotte	W 87–83	Shaquille O'Neal (23)	Shaquille O'Neal (16)	Bryant & O'Neal (4)	Staples Center; 18,997	28–5
34	January 8	@ Seattle	W 110–100	Kobe Bryant (31)	Shaquille O'Neal (9)	Shaquille O'Neal (6)	KeyArena; 17,072	29–5
35	January 10	Denver	W 130–95	Shaquille O'Neal (31)	Shaquille O'Neal (19)	Shaquille O'Neal (9)	Staples Center; 18,997	30–5
36	January 12	@ Milwaukee	W 103–94	Shaquille O'Neal (27)	Shaquille O'Neal (10)	Derek Fisher (6)	Bradley Center; 18,717	31–5
37	January 14	@ Indiana	L 102–111	Glen Rice (23)	Shaquille O'Neal (14)	Ron Harper (7)	Conseco Fieldhouse; 18,345	31–6
38	January 15	@ Minnesota	W 104–91	Shaquille O'Neal (26)	Shaquille O'Neal (19)	Harper & O'Neal (7)	Target Center; 19,767	32–6
39	January 17	Seattle	L 81–82	Shaquille O'Neal (30)	Kobe Bryant (14)	Harper & O'Neal (6)	Staples Center; 18,997	32–7
40	January 19	Cleveland	W 95–86	Shaquille O'Neal (27)	Shaquille O'Neal (23)	Kobe Bryant (4)	Staples Center; 18,997	33–7
41	January 22	Portland	L 91–95	Kobe Bryant (28)	Shaquille O'Neal (16)	Shaquille O'Neal (7)	Staples Center; 18,997	33–8
42	January 24	@ Utah	L 101–105 (2OT)	Shaquille O'Neal (36)	Shaquille O'Neal (9)	Ron Harper (8)	Delta Center; 19,911	33–9
43	January 28	Milwaukee	W 117–89	Shaquille O'Neal (30)	Shaquille O'Neal (8)	Ron Harper (10)	Staples Center; 18,997	34–9
44	January 30	@ Houston	L 83–89	Shaquille O'Neal (27)	Shaquille O'Neal (19)	Kobe Bryant (5)	Compaq Center; 16,285	34–10

February: 12–1 (home: 5–0; road: 7–1)

Game	Date	Team	Score	High points	High rebounds	High assists	Location Attendance	Record
45	February 1	@ San Antonio	L 81–105	Shaquille O'Neal (31)	Bryant & O'Neal (7)	Kobe Bryant (8)	Alamodome; 25,589	34–11
46	February 4	Utah	W 113–67	Shaquille O'Neal (25)	A.C. Green (10)	Kobe Bryant (9)	Staples Center; 18,997	35–11
47	February 7	Denver	W 106–98	Shaquille O'Neal (35)	Shaquille O'Neal (13)	Kobe Bryant (11)	Staples Center; 18,997	36–11
48	February 9	Minnesota	W 114–81	Shaquille O'Neal (37)	Shaquille O'Neal (16)	Brian Shaw (7)	Staples Center; 18,843	37–11
All-Star Break
49	February 15	@ Chicago	W 88–76	Shaquille O'Neal (29)	Shaquille O'Neal (20)	Derek Fisher (6)	United Center; 23,208	38–11
50	February 16	@ Charlotte	W 92–85	Kobe Bryant (26)	Shaquille O'Neal (14)	Kobe Bryant (6)	Charlotte Coliseum; 23,799	39–11
51	February 18	@ Orlando	W 107–99 (OT)	Shaquille O'Neal (39)	Shaquille O'Neal (16)	Derek Fisher (8)	TD Waterhouse Centre; 17,248	40–11
52	February 20	@ Philadelphia	W 87–84	Shaquille O'Neal (22)	Shaquille O'Neal (16)	Shaquille O'Neal (9)	First Union Center; 21,060	41–11
53	February 22	@ New Jersey	W 97–89	Shaquille O'Neal (35)	Shaquille O'Neal (13)	4 players tied (4)	Continental Airlines Arena; 20,049	42–11
54	February 23	@ Cleveland	W 116–98	Kobe Bryant (21)	Shaquille O'Neal (8)	Shaquille O'Neal (7)	Gund Arena; 20,562	43–11
55	February 25	Boston	W 109–96	Shaquille O'Neal (28)	Shaquille O'Neal (15)	Ron Harper (7)	Staples Center; 18,997	44–11
56	February 27	Houston	W 101–85	Kobe Bryant (31)	Shaquille O'Neal (13)	Shaquille O'Neal (8)	Staples Center; 18,997	45–11
57	February 29	@ Portland	W 90–87	Shaquille O'Neal (23)	Shaquille O'Neal (10)	Robert Horry (5)	Rose Garden; 20,584	46–11

March: 15–1 (home: 7–0; road: 8–1)

Game	Date	Team	Score	High points	High rebounds	High assists	Location Attendance	Record
58	March 1	Vancouver	W 103–91	Kobe Bryant (27)	Shaquille O'Neal (17)	O'Neal & Shaw (5)	Staples Center; 18,912	47–11
59	March 3	Indiana	W 107–92	Shaquille O'Neal (31)	Shaquille O'Neal (15)	Kobe Bryant (7)	Staples Center; 18,997	48–11
60	March 5	Miami	W 93–80	Glen Rice (23)	Shaquille O'Neal (11)	Shaquille O'Neal (7)	Staples Center; 18,997	49–11
61	March 6	@ L.A. Clippers	W 123–103	Shaquille O'Neal (61)	Shaquille O'Neal (23)	3 players tied (5)	Staples Center; 20,385	50–11
62	March 9	@ Golden State	W 109–92	Kobe Bryant (30)	Shaquille O'Neal (13)	Bryant & Fisher (4)	The Arena in Oakland; 20,136	51–11
63	March 12	Sacramento	W 109–106	Kobe Bryant (40)	Shaquille O'Neal (20)	Kobe Bryant (8)	Staples Center; 18,997	52–11
64	March 13	@ Denver	W 118–108	Shaquille O'Neal (40)	Bryant & O'Neal (9)	Shaquille O'Neal (7)	Pepsi Center; 19,099	53–11
65	March 16	@ Washington	L 102–109	Shaquille O'Neal (40)	Shaquille O'Neal (12)	Kobe Bryant (7)	MCI Center; 20,674	53–12
66	March 17	@ Detroit	W 110–82	Shaquille O'Neal (35)	Shaquille O'Neal (11)	Kobe Bryant (6)	The Palace of Auburn Hills; 22,076	54–12
67	March 19	@ New York	W 92–85	Shaquille O'Neal (43)	Shaquille O'Neal (10)	Kobe Bryant (7)	Madison Square Garden; 19,763	55–12
68	March 20	@ Miami	W 100–89	O'Neal & Rice (28)	Shaquille O'Neal (12)	Kobe Bryant (4)	American Airlines Arena; 20,075	56–12
69	March 22	Golden State	W 119–96	Shaquille O'Neal (22)	Travis Knight (10)	Ron Harper (7)	Staples Center; 18,843	57–12
70	March 24	Phoenix	W 109–101	Shaquille O'Neal (40)	Shaquille O'Neal (14)	Kobe Bryant (7)	Staples Center; 18,997	58–12
71	March 26	@ Sacramento	W 90–89	Shaquille O'Neal (34)	Kobe Bryant (14)	Kobe Bryant (4)	ARCO Arena; 17,317	59–12
72	March 29	@ Vancouver	W 108–99	Kobe Bryant (28)	Robert Horry (7)	Shaquille O'Neal (8)	General Motors Place; 16,780	60–12
73	March 31	Philadelphia	W 100–88	Shaquille O'Neal (37)	Shaquille O'Neal (14)	3 players tied (5)	Staples Center; 18,997	61–12

April: 6–3 (home: 4–1; road: 2–2)

Game	Date	Team	Score	High points	High rebounds	High assists	Location Attendance	Record
74	April 2	New York	W 106–82	Shaquille O'Neal (34)	Shaquille O'Neal (12)	Kobe Bryant (8)	Staples Center; 18,997	62–12
75	April 4	@ Phoenix	W 84–83	Shaquille O'Neal (32)	Robert Horry (11)	Ron Harper (8)	America West Arena; 19,023	63–12
76	April 5	@ Golden State	W 111–104	Shaquille O'Neal (49)	Shaquille O'Neal (13)	Kobe Bryant (11)	The Arena in Oakland; 18,621	64–12
77	April 8	San Antonio	L 80–98	Kobe Bryant (26)	A.C. Green (9)	Kobe Bryant (5)	Staples Center; 18,997	64–13
78	April 10	Seattle	W 106–103 (OT)	Kobe Bryant (33)	Kobe Bryant (10)	Bryant & Shaw (6)	Staples Center; 18,997	65–13
79	April 14	Sacramento	W 121–114	Shaquille O'Neal (41)	Shaquille O'Neal (16)	Ron Harper (10)	Staples Center; 18,997	66–13
80	April 16	Minnesota	W 101–95	Shaquille O'Neal (33)	Shaquille O'Neal (14)	Kobe Bryant (10)	Staples Center; 18,912	67–13
81	April 18	@ Dallas	L 102–112	Shaquille O'Neal (38)	Shaquille O'Neal (20)	Brian Shaw (9)	Reunion Arena; 18,190	67–14
82	April 19	@ San Antonio	L 98–103 (OT)	Kobe Bryant (23)	Brian Shaw (10)	Brian Shaw (7)	Alamodome; 29,447	67–15

1999–00 schedule

=== Playoffs ===
2000 playoff game log
Total: 15–8 (Home: 11–2; Road: 4–6)
First Round: 3–2 (home: 3–0; road: 0–2)

Game	Date	Team	Score	High points	High rebounds	High assists	Location Attendance	Series
1	April 23	Sacramento	W 117–107	Shaquille O'Neal (46)	Shaquille O'Neal (17)	Bryant & Shaw (5)	Staples Center; 18,997	1–0
2	April 27	Sacramento	W 113–89	Kobe Bryant (32)	Shaquille O'Neal (19)	Shaquille O'Neal (6)	Staples Center; 18,997	2–0
3	April 30	@ Sacramento	L 91–99	Kobe Bryant (35)	Shaquille O'Neal (17)	Ron Harper (4)	ARCO Arena; 17,317	2–1
4	May 2	@ Sacramento	L 88–101	Kobe Bryant (32)	Shaquille O'Neal (16)	Bryant & Harper (4)	ARCO Arena; 17,317	2–2
5	May 5	Sacramento	W 113–86	Shaquille O'Neal (32)	Shaquille O'Neal (18)	Bryant & Rice (6)	Staples Center; 18,997	3–2

Conference Semifinals: 4–1 (home: 3–0; road: 1–1)

Game	Date	Team	Score	High points	High rebounds	High assists	Location Attendance	Series
1	May 7	Phoenix	W 105–77	Shaquille O'Neal (37)	Shaquille O'Neal (14)	Brian Shaw (4)	Staples Center; 18,997	1–0
2	May 10	Phoenix	W 97–96	Shaquille O'Neal (38)	Shaquille O'Neal (20)	Kobe Bryant (6)	Staples Center; 18,997	2–0
3	May 12	@ Phoenix	W 105–99	Shaquille O'Neal (37)	Shaquille O'Neal (17)	Horry & Shaw (4)	America West Arena; 19,023	3–0
4	May 14	@ Phoenix	L 98–117	Shaquille O'Neal (24)	Horry & O'Neal (9)	Kobe Bryant (5)	America West Arena; 19,023	3–1
5	May 16	Phoenix	W 87–65	Kobe Bryant (17)	Shaquille O'Neal (21)	Brian Shaw (4)	Staples Center; 18,997	4–1

Conference Finals: 4–3 (home: 2–2; road: 2–1)

Game	Date	Team	Score	High points	High rebounds	High assists	Location Attendance	Series
1	May 20	Portland	W 109–94	Shaquille O'Neal (41)	Shaquille O'Neal (11)	Shaquille O'Neal (7)	Staples Center; 18,997	1–0
2	May 22	Portland	L 77–106	Shaquille O'Neal (23)	Shaquille O'Neal (12)	3 players tied (4)	Staples Center; 18,997	1–1
3	May 26	@ Portland	W 93–91	Shaquille O'Neal (26)	Shaquille O'Neal (12)	Kobe Bryant (7)	Rose Garden; 20,135	2–1
4	May 28	@ Portland	W 103–91	Shaquille O'Neal (25)	Shaquille O'Neal (11)	Kobe Bryant (7)	Rose Garden; 20,209	3–1
5	May 30	Portland	L 88–96	Shaquille O'Neal (31)	Shaquille O'Neal (21)	Robert Horry (5)	Staples Center; 18,997	3–2
6	June 2	@ Portland	L 93–103	Kobe Bryant (33)	Shaquille O'Neal (11)	Robert Horry (7)	Rose Garden; 20,340	3–3
7	June 4	Portland	W 89–84	Kobe Bryant (25)	Kobe Bryant (11)	Kobe Bryant (7)	Staples Center; 18,997	4–3

NBA Finals: 4–2 (home: 3–0; road: 1–2)

Game	Date	Team	Score	High points	High rebounds	High assists	Location Attendance	Series
1	June 7	Indiana	W 104–87	Shaquille O'Neal (43)	Shaquille O'Neal (19)	Bryant & Harper (5)	Staples Center; 18,997	1–0
2	June 9	Indiana	W 111–104	Shaquille O'Neal (40)	Shaquille O'Neal (24)	Brian Shaw (7)	Staples Center; 18,997	2–0
3	June 11	@ Indiana	L 91–100	Shaquille O'Neal (33)	Shaquille O'Neal (13)	Derek Fisher (10)	Conseco Fieldhouse; 18,345	2–1
4	June 14	@ Indiana	W 120–118 (OT)	Shaquille O'Neal (36)	Shaquille O'Neal (21)	Kobe Bryant (5)	Conseco Fieldhouse; 18,345	3–1
5	June 16	@ Indiana	L 87–120	Shaquille O'Neal (35)	Shaquille O'Neal (11)	Ron Harper (5)	Conseco Fieldhouse; 18,345	3–2
6	June 19	Indiana	W 116–111	Shaquille O'Neal (41)	Shaquille O'Neal (12)	Ron Harper (9)	Staples Center; 18,997	4–2

2000 schedule

== Playoffs ==
=== Western Conference first round ===
(1) Los Angeles Lakers vs. (8) Sacramento Kings Last Playoff Meeting: 1984 Western Conference First Round (Los Angeles won 3–0; Kings were in Kansas City, Missouri)

NBC

April 23
2:30pm PDT

Sacramento Kings 107, Los Angeles Lakers 117

Staples Center, Los Angeles

In Game 1, the Lakers started the game strong, outscoring the visiting Kings, 65–55, at halftime. The Lakers carried this momentum all the way towards the second half, thus winning Game 1 of the series. O'Neal led the Lakers with 46 points, 17 rebounds and 4 blocks. Bryant added 23 points, 7 rebounds and 5 assists for the Lakers. Shaquille O'Neal became the first player to record that statline since Hakeem Olajuwon back in 1987. He also became the first Lakers player to have done that since Kareem Abdul-Jabbar recorded 45 points and 18 rebounds back in 1977.

TNT

April 27
7:30pm PDT

Sacramento Kings 89, Los Angeles Lakers 113

Staples Center, Los Angeles

In Game 2, the Lakers were once again dominant, outscoring the visiting Kings in every quarter. Kobe Bryant led the Lakers with 32 points and 4 rebounds. O'Neal added 23 points, 19 rebounds, 6 assists and 3 blocks for the Lakers.

TNT

April 30
7:30pm PDT

Los Angeles Lakers 91, Sacramento Kings 99

ARCO Arena, Sacramento

In Game 3, the series now shifted in Sacramento, wherein the Kings now host the Lakers. Up 2–0 in the series, the Lakers lead the Kings, 51–46, at halftime. The Lakers maintained that lead until the end of the third quarter. However, the Kings outscored the Lakers 33-20 during the fourth quarter, thus winning against the visiting Lakers. Kobe Bryant led all players in terms of scoring with 35 points for the Lakers.

TNT

May 2
7:30pm PDT

Los Angeles Lakers 88, Sacramento Kings 101

ARCO Arena, Sacramento

In Game 4, the Kings opened up their largest lead of the series in the first half, leading the visiting Lakers, 56–45, at halftime. Despite the Lakers outscoring the Kings in the third quarter, the Kings responded in the fourth quarter, thus the Lakers lost again on the road, 88–101. Kobe Bryant once again led all players in scoring with 32 points to go along with 6 rebounds.

TNT

May 5
7:30pm PDT

Sacramento Kings 86, Los Angeles Lakers 113
Los Angeles wins series, 3-2

Staples Center, Los Angeles

With the Kings winning in Game 4, this sets up for a winner-take-all Game 5 back in Los Angeles. The Lakers, determined to avenge their losses, blew out the visiting Kings, 113–86, thus advancing to the next round. Shaquille O'Neal led the Lakers with 32 points, 18 rebounds and 4 assists.

=== Western Conference semifinals ===
(1) Los Angeles Lakers vs. (5) Phoenix Suns Last Playoff Meeting: 1993 Western Conference First Round (Phoenix won 3–2)

May 7

Phoenix Suns 77, Los Angeles Lakers 105

Staples Center, Los Angeles

May 10

Phoenix Suns 96, Los Angeles Lakers 97

Staples Center, Los Angeles

May 12

Los Angeles Lakers 105, Phoenix Suns 99

America West Arena, Phoenix

May 14

Los Angeles Lakers 98, Phoenix Suns 117

America West Arena, Phoenix

May 16

Phoenix Suns 65, Los Angeles Lakers 87
Los Angeles wins series, 4-1

Staples Center, Los Angeles

=== Western Conference finals ===
(1) Los Angeles Lakers vs. (3) Portland Trail Blazers Last Playoff Meeting: 1998 Western Conference First Round (Los Angeles won 3–1)

May 20
NBC 3:30EST

Portland Trail Blazers 94, Los Angeles Lakers 109

Staples Center, Los Angeles

May 22
TNT 9:00EST

Portland Trail Blazers 106, Los Angeles Lakers 77

Staples Center, Los Angeles

May 26
9:00EST

Los Angeles Lakers 93, Portland Trail Blazers 91

Rose Garden, Portland

May 28
3:30EST

Los Angeles Lakers 103, Portland Trail Blazers 91

Rose Garden, Portland

May 30
9:00EST

Portland Trail Blazers 96, Los Angeles Lakers 88

Staples Center, Los Angeles

June 2
9:30EST

Los Angeles Lakers 93, Portland Trail Blazers 103

Rose Garden, Portland

June 4
7:30EST

Portland Trail Blazers 84, Los Angeles Lakers 89
Los Angeles wins series, 4-3

Staples Center, Los Angeles

=== NBA Finals ===
- Lakers' backup center John Salley became the first player in NBA history to play on three different championship-winning franchises, as he won titles in 1989 and '90 with the Detroit Pistons and 1996 with the Chicago Bulls.
- This was the Lakers first NBA Finals in the new Staples Center.
- After closing out game 6, fans rioted outside Staples Center by making bonfires, tipping cars, breaking windows of cars and buildings, and vandalizing businesses around the area. Overall, they caused $1 million in damages. In Lakers' championship run the following year, the LAPD came out in bigger force after the Lakers won and prevented the same thing from happening again.
- Staples Center, which was a first-year building in 2000, had a very tricky shooting background and opposing teams often had difficulty shooting there. Pacers coach Larry Bird wanted to have a shoot-around in the arena the day before Game 6 to help his team shoot more consistently because they shot very poorly in Games 1 and 2. However, the Pacers couldn't practice in the building because of an Arena Football game. Bird was very upset about this, and his team had to go down to the Lakers practice facility in El Segundo.
- The two arenas in this series, Conseco Fieldhouse and Staples Center, were both first-year arenas.

==== Summary ====
The following scoring summary is written in a line score format, except that the quarter numbers are replaced by game numbers.

Team	Game 1	Game 2	Game 3	Game 4*	Game 5	Game 6	Wins
Los Angeles (West)	104	111	91	120	87	116	4
Indiana (East)	87	104	100	118	120	111	2

==== Aspects ====
Although the Lakers were one of the more talented teams in the NBA the previous year, they failed to win a single game against the San Antonio Spurs in the 1999 NBA playoffs. Twenty-four days after being swept by the eventual league champion, the Lakers signed Phil Jackson as head coach. Jackson, famous for coaching Michael Jordan and the six-time champion Chicago Bulls, would build his triangle offense around Shaquille O'Neal and Kobe Bryant. General Manager Jerry West surrounded O'Neal and Bryant with effective role players such as Glen Rice, Ron Harper (who had experience with Jackson's triangle offense as part of the '96–'98 Bulls), and A.C. Green (member of the last two Lakers championship teams).

Along with these starters, the Lakers also possessed a strong bench. Robert Horry not only had championship experience with the Houston Rockets but also was a threat on the perimeter and a defensive star. Derek Fisher was a defensively minded point-guard with the ability to shoot well from long range. Rick Fox, acquired after being released by the Boston Celtics, was the Lakers' sixth man. With a healthy O'Neal, the Lakers dominated the regular season, with winning streaks of 11, 16, and 19 en route to a 67–15 record, tying the 1992 Chicago Bulls and 1986 Boston Celtics as the fifth best record in NBA regular season history.

Although many expected the Lakers to reach the Finals, the road would be a rocky one. In the first round, the Lakers won the first two games against the Sacramento Kings, only to drop the next two games in Sacramento. The Lakers then defeated Sacramento in Game 5, 113–86, to face the Phoenix Suns in the conference semifinals. The Lakers clobbered the Suns, winning the series 4–1 (with their only loss coming in Game 4). In Game 1 of the Western Conference Finals against the Portland Trail Blazers, Rasheed Wallace earned two technical fouls and was ejected; the Lakers took advantage of Wallace's absence and secured victory. The Trail Blazers stormed back in the next game, giving the Lakers their worst home loss of the season in a 106–77 shellacking. This setback did not affect Los Angeles, as they assembled a 3–1 series lead by winning the next two games in Portland. The Lakers underestimated the Trail Blazers, however. Led by former Jackson linchpin Scottie Pippen, Portland won back-to-back elimination games and forced a series-deciding Game 7. Amid several controversial foul calls by referee Dick Bavetta against members of the Trail Blazers, Portland relinquished a 75–60 fourth quarter lead. Rallying back with a 25–4 run, the Lakers won the game and secured a berth in the NBA Finals.

In the 1997–1998 NBA season, the Chicago Bulls narrowly defeated the Pacers, 4 games to 3, in the Eastern Conference Finals. The 1998–1999 NBA season began with a lockout but saw Indiana return to the Eastern Conference Finals, where they fell to the New York Knicks. The 1999–2000 NBA season brought several major changes to the Pacers. It was their first season at Conseco Fieldhouse, as well as their first since 1993 without center Antonio Davis, who was traded for the rights to the No. 5 overall pick in the 1999 NBA Draft. Jalen Rose replaced Chris Mullin in the starting line up, winning the NBA Most Improved Player award, while Austin Croshere replaced him as the sixth man.

The Pacers started the season 7–7 but eventually finished with an Eastern Conference best 56–26 record, including a franchise-best 25 game win streak at home. The Pacers, like the Lakers, struggled in the playoffs. They needed a clutch Travis Best three-pointer to dispatch the Milwaukee Bucks in five games. Indiana faced the Philadelphia 76ers in the second round and took the series in six games, earning a trip to the Eastern Conference Finals. The Pacers would face their rival Knicks, winning a memorable six-game series in a reversal of fortunes from years past. With the victory, Indiana advanced to the first NBA Finals in franchise history, becoming the second former ABA team to do so.

==== Game 1 ====
Wednesday, June 7, 2000, 9:00 at the Staples Center.

The Lakers dominated from the start. The Lakers shot 15-for-20 (75%) in the first period while the Pacers shot only 7-for-20 (35%). Miller would miss all of his shots in the first quarter to give the Lakers a 15-point lead. Croshere came off the bench to keep the Pacers alive in the 2nd quarter, scoring 9 points and grabbing 4 rebounds in the quarter. Although the Pacers attempted a comeback in the 2nd quarter, they were still down by 12. In the 3rd quarter, it would be Jackson who led the Pacers to a comeback, cutting the Lakers lead by 2. Miller also hit his first field goal in the 3rd quarter, though it would be his last. The Lakers handled the Pacers in the final quarter, with a 13–2 run winning by 17 points. O'Neal scored 43 points and grabbed 19 rebounds.

Team	1st Qt.	2nd Qt.	3rd Qt.	4th Qt.	Total
Indiana	18	22	28	16	87
Los Angeles	33	25	22	27	104

==== Game 2 ====
Friday, June 9, 2000, 9:00 at the Staples Center.

Los Angeles and Indiana were evenly matched for the first quarter, both scoring 28. However, Los Angeles suffered a major setback when Kobe Bryant left the game in the 2nd quarter due to a sprained ankle and did not return. Jalen Rose later admitted that he intentionally stuck out his foot when Kobe shot a jumpshot in order to trip him when he landed. Ron Harper went in for Bryant and scored 21 points for the game. Desperate to try to gain the lead, Larry Bird resorted to the "Hack-a-Shaq" strategy. Shaq shot 39 free throws, making only 18, an NBA record for most free throws attempted. Despite this low percentage, Shaq made 9 of 16 in the 4th quarter to keep a Lakers lead. The Pacers cut the lead to 99–96 and were looking to foul Shaq, but when Shaq got the ball he passed to Robert Horry who converted not only the layup, but the foul shot as well giving them a 102–96 lead en route to a 111–104 Lakers victory.

Team	1st Qt.	2nd Qt.	3rd Qt.	4th Qt.	Total
Indiana	28	21	20	35	104
Los Angeles	28	24	21	38	111

==== Game 3 ====
Sunday, June 11, 2000, 7:30 at the Conseco Fieldhouse.

Taking advantage of Kobe Bryant's ankle injury, Indiana restored a semblance of parity to the proceedings. Kobe's absence was felt as the Pacers had an 11–2 run in the first quarter to take an 8-point lead. Austin Croshere once again had another huge 2nd quarter, scoring 8 points as the Pacers shot 61% from the field. The Lakers tried to make a run to get back into the game, but upon doings so, Indiana answered with 12 straight points and led by 17. The Lakers were desperate and attempted another run to get within 3 points, but Reggie Miller nailed all his free throws at the end of the game to give Indiana a 9-point win.

Team	1st Qt.	2nd Qt.	3rd Qt.	4th Qt.	Total
Los Angeles	15	27	24	25	91
Indiana	23	30	26	21	100

==== Game 4 ====
Wednesday, June 14, 2000, 9:00 at the Conseco Fieldhouse.

The Pacers took a quick 9–2 lead due to Rik Smits hitting his first four shots. Kobe Bryant attempted to play with his sore ankle but only managed to score 6 points in the first half. Even though Bryant and O'Neal were in foul trouble in the first half (each picking up his third with 5 minutes remaining in the second quarter), Indiana could not take advantage and did not extend their lead. This would be a problem as Kobe Bryant scored 10 points and the Lakers took a 62–60 lead due to a Glen Rice three-pointer. The game remained close going into the fourth quarter, when O'Neal and Reggie Miller scored 14 and 13 points respectively, sending the game into overtime. Midway through overtime, O'Neal committed his sixth foul but 21-year-old Bryant delivered three clutch shots, as the Lakers were able to overcome back-up center John Salley's inability to effectively defend Smits. Smits and Miller scored all 14 of Indiana's OT points, but it was not enough to overcome as Miller missed a last-second three-pointer, and L.A. was able to pull one out in Indianapolis.

Team	1st Qt.	2nd Qt.	3rd Qt.	4th Qt.	OT	Total
Los Angeles	23	28	29	24	16	120
Indiana	33	21	23	27	14	118

==== Game 5 ====
Friday, June 16, 2000, 9:00 at the Conseco Fieldhouse.

Reggie Miller and the Pacers dominated the game from the start in what would be Larry Bird's last game as a coach in the state of Indiana. Reggie Miller came out and made 5 straight shots including a 4-point play. The Pacers hit their first 6 three point shots in the game. The Pacers would have a 20-point lead in the 2nd quarter, and eventually won by 33 – it was the worst Lakers NBA Finals loss since the 148–114 loss to Boston in the 1985 NBA Finals, known as the "Memorial Day Massacre."

With their loss in Game 5, the Lakers record in close-out games dropped to 3–6 in the 2000 NBA Playoffs (the other losses coming in Games 3 and 4 in the first round against Sacramento, Game 4 in the series against Phoenix, and Games 5 and 6 versus Portland). As a result, the series returned to California.

Team	1st Qt.	2nd Qt.	3rd Qt.	4th Qt.	Total
Los Angeles	28	17	22	20	87
Indiana	39	25	22	34	120

==== Game 6 ====
Monday, June 19, 2000, 9:00 at the Staples Center.

After the two teams traded blows in the first quarter, Mark Jackson concluded the period with a turn-around half-court shot at the buzzer to give the Pacers a 26–24 advantage. They would not relinquish their lead until the fourth quarter. In the first half, the Pacers would lead by as many as twelve points. However, the Lakers chipped away and entered intermission trailing 56–53. Indiana, however, added two more points to their lead, and entered the final period in a position to force a decisive seventh game.

In the fourth quarter, the momentum shifted. The Lakers got four timely three-pointers from Derek Fisher, Robert Horry, and Rick Fox. The turning point occurred on a play where Brian Shaw stole the ball from Jalen Rose, leading to a fast break where Shaquille O'Neal hit an off-balance shot to give the Lakers the lead. The Pacers never led after that point.

The Lakers would build a seven-point lead, but the Pacers fought back to tie the score at 103. After a timeout, the Lakers scored six unanswered points to regain control. The Pacers made one final valiant effort, but it fell short and the Lakers clinched their first championship in twelve years. Shaquille O'Neal led all scorers with 41 points and also pulled down 12 rebounds. He was awarded the Finals MVP.

Team	1st Qt.	2nd Qt.	3rd Qt.	4th Qt.	Total
Indiana	26	30	28	27	111
Los Angeles	24	29	26	37	116

== Player statistics ==
Legend
GP	Games played	GS	Games started	MPG	Minutes per game
FG%	Field-goal percentage	3P%	3-point field-goal percentage	FT%	Free-throw percentage
RPG	Rebounds per game	APG	Assists per game	SPG	Steals per game
BPG	Blocks per game	PPG	Points per game

=== Season ===
Player	GP	GS	MPG	FG%	3P%	FT%	RPG	APG	SPG	BPG	PPG
Kobe Bryant	66	62	38.2	.468	.319	.821	6.3	4.9	1.61	.94	22.5
John Celestand	16	0	11.6	.333	.222	.833	.7	1.2	.44	.00	2.3
Derek Fisher	78	22	23.1	.346	.313	.724	1.8	2.8	1.03	.04	6.3
Rick Fox	82	1	18.0	.414	.326	.808	2.4	1.7	.63	.32	6.5
Devean George	49	1	7.0	.389	.340	.659	1.5	.2	.20	.08	3.2
A.C. Green	82	82	23.5	.447	.250	.695	5.9	1.0	.65	.22	5.0
Ron Harper	80	78	25.5	.399	.311	.680	4.2	3.4	1.06	.49	7.0
Robert Horry	76	0	22.2	.438	.309	.788	4.8	1.6	1.11	1.05	5.7
Sam Jacobson	3	0	6.0	.556	.000	.000	.3	.7	.33	.00	3.3
Travis Knight	63	0	6.5	.390	.000	.607	2.0	.4	.10	.37	1.7
Tyronn Lue	8	0	18.2	.487	.500	.750	1.5	2.1	.38	.00	6.0
Shaquille O'Neal	79	79	40.0	.574	.000	.524	13.6	3.8	.46	3.03	29.7
Glen Rice	80	80	31.6	.430	.367	.874	4.1	2.2	.59	.15	15.9
John Salley	45	3	6.7	.362	.000	.750	1.4	.6	.18	.31	1.6
Brian Shaw	74	2	16.9	.382	.310	.759	2.9	2.7	.47	.19	4.1

=== Playoffs ===
Player	GP	GS	MPG	FG%	3P%	FT%	RPG	APG	SPG	BPG	PPG
Kobe Bryant	22	22	39.0	.442	.344	.754	4.5	4.4	1.45	1.45	21.1
Derek Fisher	21	0	15.3	.430	.414	.760	1.0	2.0	.52	.05	4.7
Rick Fox	23	0	14.4	.452	.462	.762	1.7	1.2	.39	.00	4.3
Devean George	9	0	5.0	.368	.200	.545	1.1	.2	.11	.00	2.4
A.C. Green	23	23	18.7	.411	.000	.696	4.2	.6	.61	.13	3.9
Ron Harper	23	23	28.0	.431	.231	.702	3.7	3.2	1.00	.57	8.6
Robert Horry	23	0	26.9	.407	.288	.702	5.3	2.5	.87	.83	7.6
Travis Knight	14	0	3.4	.533	.000	.333	.4	.0	.07	.21	1.3
Shaquille O'Neal	23	23	43.5	.566	.000	.456	15.4	3.1	.57	2.39	30.7
Glen Rice	23	23	33.3	.408	.418	.798	4.0	2.1	.65	.17	12.4
John Salley	18	0	4.3	.385	.000	.700	1.2	.2	.06	.33	.9
Brian Shaw	22	1	18.5	.421	.333	.813	2.3	3.0	.50	.18	5.4

Player statistics citation:

== Award winners ==
- Shaquille O'Neal, NBA Most Valuable Player
- Shaquille O'Neal, All-NBA First Team
- Kobe Bryant, All-NBA Second Team
- Kobe Bryant, NBA All-Defensive First Team
- Shaquille O'Neal, NBA All-Defensive Second Team
- Shaquille O'Neal, NBA Finals Most Valuable Player

== Transactions ==
The Lakers have been involved in the following transactions during the 1999–2000 season.

=== Trades ===
September 1, 1999	To Los Angeles Lakers A.C. Green	To Dallas Mavericks Sean Rooks; 2000 2nd round draft pick
September 21, 1999	To Los Angeles Lakers Melvin Levett	To Detroit Pistons Derek Harper

Briefly, the Lakers considered to trade Kobe Bryant for Grant Hill, but it never came close to consummation.

=== Additions ===
Player	Signed	Former Team
Ron Harper	Signed 2-year contract for $4.2 Million	Chicago Bulls
Brian Shaw	Signed 1-year contract for $? Million	Portland Trail Blazers
John Salley	Signed ? year contract for $? Million	N/A

=== Subtractions ===
Player	Reason Left	New Team
Ruben Patterson	Free agent	Seattle SuperSonics
J. R. Reid	Free agent	Milwaukee Bucks

Player Transactions Citation:
