= Robert Horry =

American basketball player (born 1970)

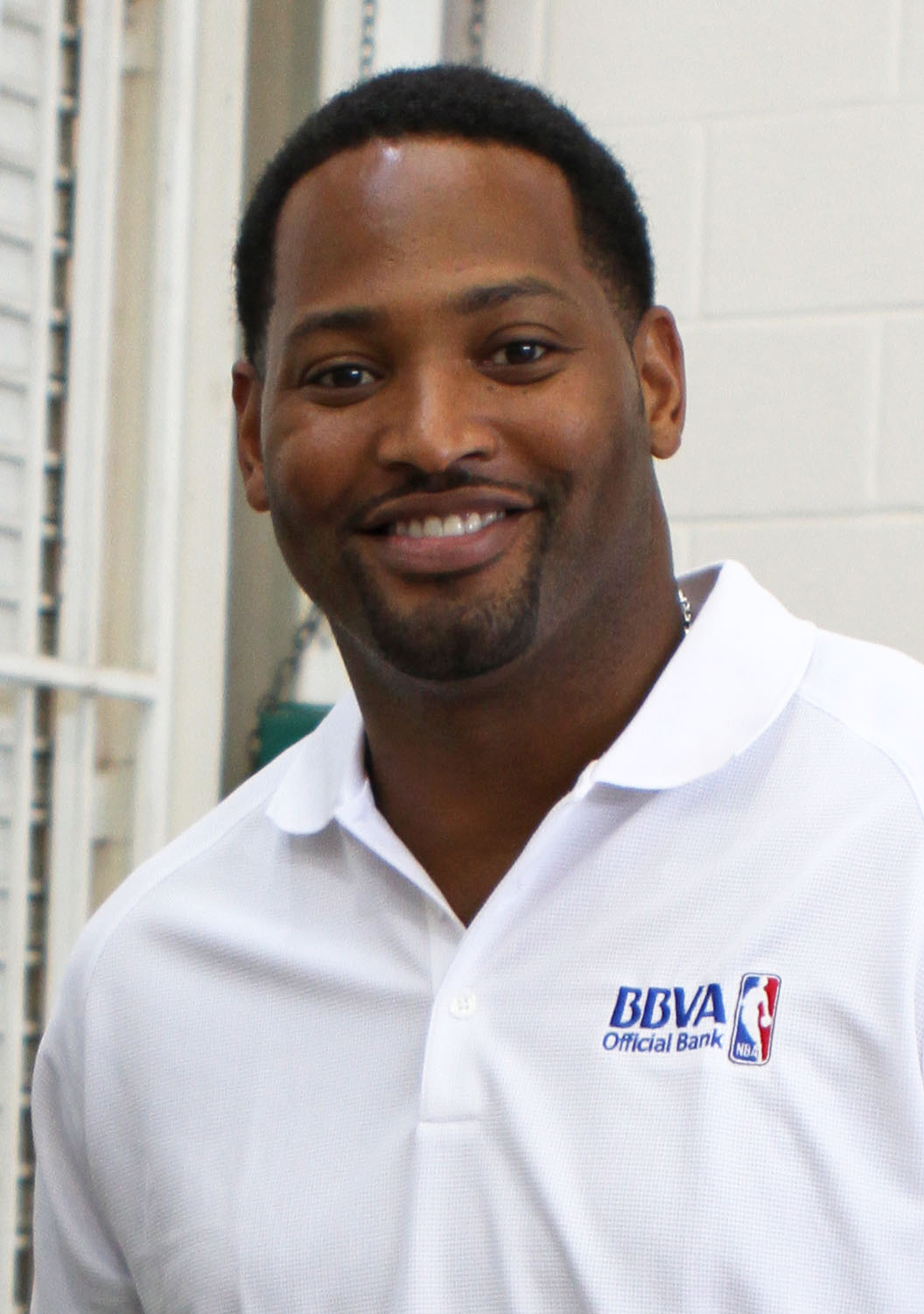
- Horry in 2012

Personal information
- Born: August 25, 1970 (age 56) Harford County, Maryland, U.S.
- Listed height: 6 ft 10 in (2.08 m)
- Listed weight: 240 lb (109 kg)

Career information
- High school: Andalusia (Andalusia, Alabama)
- College: Alabama (1988–1992)
- NBA draft: 1992: 1st round, 11th overall pick
- Drafted by: Houston Rockets
- Playing career: 1992–2008
- Position: Power forward / small forward
- Number: 25, 5

Career history
- 1992–1996: Houston Rockets
- 1996–1997: Phoenix Suns
- 1997–2003: Los Angeles Lakers
- 2003–2008: San Antonio Spurs

Career highlights
- 7× NBA champion (1994, 1995, 2000–2002, 2005, 2007); NBA All-Rookie Second Team (1993); Second-team All-SEC (1992); Third-team All-SEC (1990); SEC All-Defensive Team (1992); Fourth-team Parade All-American (1988)

Career statistics
- Points: 7,715 (7.0 ppg)
- Rebounds: 5,269 (4.8 rpg)
- Assists: 2,343 (2.1 apg)
- Stats at NBA.com
- Stats at Basketball Reference

Robert Keith Horry (/ˈɒri/ ORR-ee; born August 25, 1970) is an American sports commentator and former professional basketball player who played in the National Basketball Association (NBA) as a member of the Houston Rockets, Phoenix Suns, Los Angeles Lakers, and San Antonio Spurs. Nicknamed "Big Shot Rob", (Note: Horry was also known as "Big Shot Bob" but personally preferred the "Rob" variant. "You can make it Rob," Horry said. "R-o-b. But B-o-b, that’s not me.") Horry was a member of seven NBA championship winning teams over his 16-year career and is regarded as one of the most clutch shooters in NBA history.

== Early life ==
Robert Keith Horry was born on August 25, 1970, in Harford County, Maryland. Soon afterwards, his father, Staff Sergeant Robert Horry Sr., divorced his mother, Leila, and moved to South Carolina. Horry grew up in Andalusia, Alabama. Later, when Robert Sr. was stationed at Fort Benning, Georgia, the father and son met weekly. As a senior at Andalusia High School, Horry won the Naismith Alabama High School Player of the Year Award.

== College career ==
Horry attended the University of Alabama, where he played college basketball for Coach Wimp Sanderson, and he was a teammate of fellow future NBA player Latrell Sprewell. At Alabama, Horry played from 1988 to 1992. He started 108 of the 133 games he played and helped the Tide win three Southeastern Conference (SEC) tournament titles and twice reached the NCAA's Sweet 16 round. Alabama compiled a 98–36 record during his four seasons. He set a school record for career blocked shots (282). He was selected to the All-Southeastern Conference, the SEC All-Defensive and the SEC All-Academic teams. Years later, Horry returned to the university to finish his degree and graduated in spring 2021.

== Professional career ==
=== Houston Rockets (1992–1996) ===
Horry was selected 11th overall in the 1992 NBA draft in the first round by the Houston Rockets as a small forward. He spent his first four seasons with the Rockets, helping them win the NBA championship in 1994 and 1995. He set an individual NBA Finals record with seven steals in a game. During his years with the Rockets, Horry wore number 25.

In Game 7 of the 1993 Western Conference Semifinals against the Seattle SuperSonics, he hit a jump shot with the shot clock expiring and 33 seconds left in regulation to put the Rockets up 93–91. The Rockets lost in overtime and lost the series. In February 1994, he and Matt Bullard were traded to the Detroit Pistons for Sean Elliott, but Elliott failed a physical because of kidney problems, so the trade was rescinded. Horry said that the trade falling through probably saved his career. Horry went on to be a key member of the Rockets' title teams. He began to build his "Big Shot" reputation in the 1995 playoffs: first, with a game-winning jumper with 6.5 seconds left in Game 1 of the 1995 Western Conference Finals against the San Antonio Spurs, then hitting a three to put Houston up 104–100 with 14.1 seconds left in a 106–103 win in Game 3 of the 1995 NBA Finals against the Orlando Magic. The Rockets went on to win Game 4 and their second championship. Horry later said that out of his seven championship victories, this was the one he was the most proud of because the Rockets were the sixth seed in the Western Conference.

=== Phoenix Suns (1996–1997) ===
On August 19, 1996, before the 1996–97 NBA season, Horry was traded to the Phoenix Suns, along with Sam Cassell, Chucky Brown and Mark Bryant, for former NBA Most Valuable Player Charles Barkley. Horry had been criticized in Houston for not taking enough shots and felt that was what prompted the Rockets to trade him. On January 5, 1997, in a game against the Celtics, he had an on-court altercation with head coach Danny Ainge. Horry had been performing poorly and had just been substituted out. As he was leaving the floor, Horry walked up to Ainge and the two shared some words. As he was walking away, Horry screamed obscenities at Ainge and then threw a towel at his face. Horry was promptly suspended by the Suns for two games. Suns GM Jerry Colangelo wanted to suspend Horry for longer but, at that time, the Collective Bargaining Agreement only allowed a maximum of two games.

=== Los Angeles Lakers (1997–2003) ===
Due to his attitude problems and lackluster performance, Horry, along with Joe Kleine, were traded to the Los Angeles Lakers on January 10, 1997, for Cedric Ceballos and Rumeal Robinson. Because the Lakers had retired jersey number 25 to honor Gail Goodrich, Horry wore the number 5. On May 6, 1997, he hit seven three-point shots in a row, setting the NBA playoff record for most three-point shots without a miss.

During the 1999–2000 season, Horry played behind A.C. Green, but frequently played more minutes off the bench than the starters, especially during the playoffs. In the 2000 Finals against the Indiana Pacers, the Lakers took a 2–1 lead into Game 4 in Indiana. The game went into overtime. Shaquille O'Neal fouled out, but Kobe Bryant led a run to seal the Laker victory. Horry finished with 17 points in 37 minutes, his high for the Finals. The Lakers won the 2000 NBA Finals in six games. Horry averaged 7.6 points and 5.4 rebounds per game throughout the 2000 playoffs.

In the 2000–01 season, Horry played behind Horace Grant, but once again played big minutes in the playoffs. He played in 16 Lakers 2001 playoffs games, averaging 5.9 points. In the Finals, the Lakers dropped Game 1 before winning Game 2. In Game 3, in Philadelphia, he scored 12 of his 15 points in the fourth quarter, including a critical three-pointer with 47.1 seconds left in the fourth quarter to make it 92–88. He followed this with four consecutive free throws in the last 21 seconds to help seal a 96–91 Laker victory. In Game 4, Horry made three of the Lakers' 10 total three-pointers as the Lakers rolled to a 100–86 victory. The Lakers won Game 5, 108–96, to clinch their second straight championship. He has said this victory was the second-proudest of his career, after the 1995 NBA Finals.

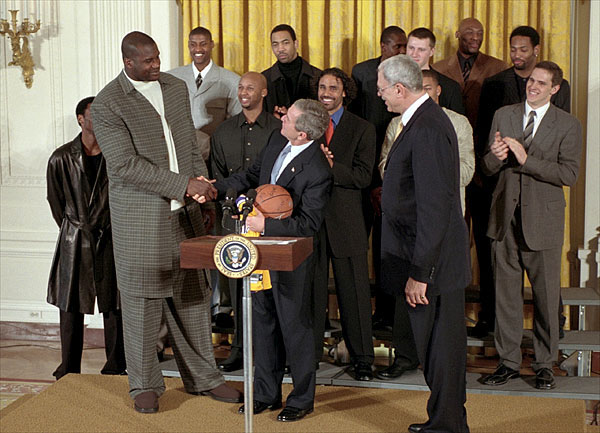
Horry (back row, farthest right) at a White House ceremony in January 2002 following the Lakers' 2001 NBA Finals victory.

In the 2001–02 season, he was the backup power forward to Samaki Walker, starting just 23 games. In the playoffs, Horry started 14 of the Lakers' 19 games, playing an average of 37 minutes, a game with averages of 9.3 points and 8.1 rebounds a game. Horry built his reputation for clutch play in Game 4 of the 2002 Western Conference Finals against the Sacramento Kings. Trailing two games to one in the series and facing Game 5 in Sacramento, the Lakers were down by as many as 24 points in the first half. Eventually, the Lakers cut the lead to 99–97 with 11.8 seconds to play. On the final possession, after Kobe and Shaq missed consecutive layups, Sacramento center Vlade Divac knocked the ball away from the basket in an attempt to run out the clock. However, the ball bounced right to Horry, who hit a three-pointer as time expired to win Game 4 100–99. A day later, Magic Johnson called Horry "one of the 10 best clutch players in league history". The Lakers would win the series in 7 games and sweep the New Jersey Nets 4–0 in the NBA Finals to complete a three-peat. Horry started all four games in the Finals.

On March 5, 2003, Indiana Pacers center Jermaine O'Neal swatted the inside pass for Shaquille O'Neal to a wide-open Horry, who hit the game-winning shot. In the 2003 playoffs, the Lakers were attempting to win their fourth straight NBA championship. In the closing seconds of Game 5 of the Western Conference Semifinals, Horry's potential game-winning shot rattled in and out, putting a halt to the Lakers' rally from a 25-point deficit. The Lakers were eliminated in six games. Horry was 0-18 from the three-point line during the series.

=== San Antonio Spurs (2003–2008) ===
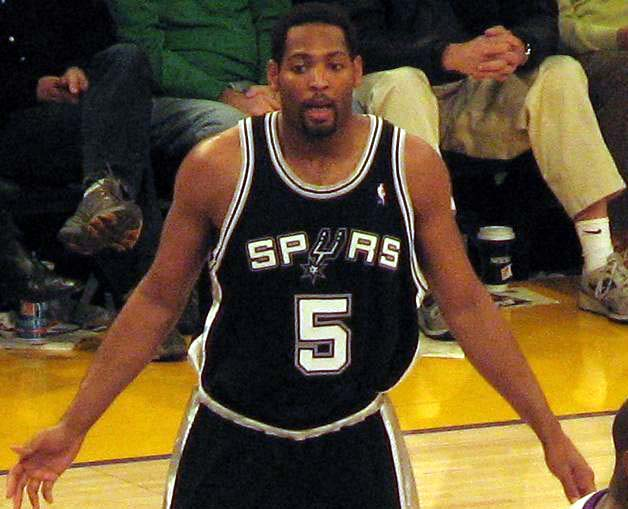
Horry with the Spurs in 2007

Following the 2002–03 season, Horry became a free agent. Citing concerns over family, all of whom live in Houston, he signed with the San Antonio Spurs. During the 2002–03 season, the Lakers had increased Horry's minutes to nearly 30 a game. With the Spurs, coach Gregg Popovich cut his minutes significantly. In the 2003–04 season, the Spurs won 57 games and reached the 2004 playoffs where they swept the Memphis Grizzlies in four games, before losing in six games to the Los Angeles Lakers.

During the following season, the Spurs reached the 2005 playoffs. Horry went 38 of 85 from three-point range. In Game 5 of the 2005 NBA Finals, after only scoring three points in the first three quarters, he scored 21 of the Spurs' points in the fourth quarter and overtime. The Spurs went on to win Game 5, 96–95, after Horry hit a game-winning three-point shot with 5.9 seconds left. ESPN columnist Bill Simmons wrote, "Horry's Game 5 ranks alongside MJ's Game 6 in 1998, Worthy's Game 7 in 1988, Frazier's Game 7 in 1970, and every other clutch Finals performance over the years". His 15 three point shots was a finals record that stood until the 2019 NBA Finals when Fred VanVleet made 16.

During the 2007 playoffs, Horry body-checked Phoenix Suns' point guard Steve Nash in Game 4, drawing a flagrant foul call. During the ensuing commotion, Raja Bell was assessed a technical foul for charging at him. Horry was ejected from the game and suspended for Games 5 and 6. The Spurs won the next game on the road, and then the series, eventually moving on to the 2007 NBA Finals, where they swept the Cleveland Cavaliers.

Horry began wearing the number 25 again after the 2006–07 season. After the 2007–08 season, Horry became a free agent but went unsigned, marking his last professional season.

As of 2025, Horry works as a commentator for the Lakers on Spectrum SportsNet.

=== Records and honors ===
Horry is one of four NBA players to win championships with three teams: two with the Houston Rockets, three with the Los Angeles Lakers, and two with the San Antonio Spurs. He holds NBA records for most steals in a Finals game and for most three-point shots made in a playoff game without a miss. He is the only non-member of the 1950s and 1960s Boston Celtics to win more than six championships.

When he retired, Horry held the record for three-pointers all-time in the NBA Finals with 56, having eclipsed Michael Jordan's record of 42. Five players passed him before the 2023 NBA Finals. He holds the NBA playoffs record for most three-point field goals made in a game without a miss (seven) against the Utah Jazz in Game 2 of the 1997 Western Conference Semifinals.

In 2009, Horry played in the 2009 NBA Asia Challenge against the Philippine Basketball Association All-Stars at Araneta Coliseum in Manila. Horry was the first player to accumulate 100 steals, 100 blocked shots, and 100 threes in one season (steals and blocks were not recorded until the 1973–74 season and the three-point line was not implemented until the 1979–80 season). In 2010, he was inducted into the Alabama Sports Hall of Fame. Horry has played in three Game 7s which went to overtime; the 1993 Western Conference Semifinals, as a member of the Houston Rockets, the 2002 Western Conference Finals with the Los Angeles Lakers, and the 2006 Western Conference Semifinals with the San Antonio Spurs.

== NBA career statistics ==
Legend
GP	Games played	GS	Games started	MPG	Minutes per game
FG%	Field goal percentage	3P%	3-point field goal percentage	FT%	Free throw percentage
RPG	Rebounds per game	APG	Assists per game	SPG	Steals per game
BPG	Blocks per game	PPG	Points per game	**Bold**	Career high
†	Won an NBA championship

=== Regular season ===
Year	Team	GP	GS	MPG	FG%	3P%	FT%	RPG	APG	SPG	BPG	PPG
1992–93	Houston	79	79	29.5	.474	.255	.715	5.0	2.4	1.0	1.1	10.1
1993–94†	Houston	**81**	**81**	29.3	.459	.324	.732	5.4	2.9	1.5	.9	9.9
1994–95†	Houston	64	61	32.4	.447	.379	.761	5.1	3.4	1.5	1.2	10.2
1995–96	Houston	71	71	**37.1**	.410	.366	.776	5.8	**4.0**	1.6	**1.5**	**12.0**
1996–97	Phoenix	32	15	22.5	.421	.308	.640	3.7	1.7	.9	.8	6.9
1996–97	L.A. Lakers	22	14	30.7	.455	.329	.700	5.4	2.5	**1.7**	1.3	9.2
1997–98	L.A. Lakers	72	71	30.4	**.476**	.204	.692	**7.5**	2.3	1.6	1.3	7.4
1998–99	L.A. Lakers	38	5	19.6	.459	**.444**	.739	4.0	1.5	.9	1.0	4.9
1999–00†	L.A. Lakers	76	0	22.2	.438	.309	.788	4.8	1.6	1.1	1.0	5.7
2000–01†	L.A. Lakers	79	1	20.1	.387	.346	.711	3.7	1.6	.7	.7	5.2
2001–02†	L.A. Lakers	**81**	23	26.4	.398	.374	.783	5.9	2.9	1.0	1.1	6.8
2002–03	L.A. Lakers	80	26	29.3	.387	.288	.769	6.4	2.9	1.2	.8	6.5
2003–04	San Antonio	**81**	1	15.9	.405	.380	.645	3.4	1.2	.6	.6	4.8
2004–05†	San Antonio	75	16	18.6	.419	.370	**.789**	3.6	1.1	.9	.8	6.0
2005–06	San Antonio	63	3	18.8	.384	.368	.647	3.8	1.3	.7	.8	5.1
2006–07†	San Antonio	68	8	16.5	.359	.336	.594	3.4	1.1	.7	.6	3.9
2007–08	San Antonio	45	5	13.0	.319	.257	.643	2.4	1.0	.5	.4	2.5
Career		1,107	480	24.5	.425	.341	.726	4.8	2.1	1.0	.9	7.0

=== Playoffs ===
Year	Team	GP	GS	MPG	FG%	3P%	FT%	RPG	APG	SPG	BPG	PPG
1993	Houston	12	12	31.2	.465	.300	.741	5.2	3.2	1.5	1.3	10.5
1994†	Houston	**23**	**23**	33.8	.434	.382	.765	6.1	**3.6**	1.5	.9	11.7
1995†	Houston	22	22	38.2	.445	.400	.744	7.0	3.5	1.5	1.2	**13.1**
1996	Houston	8	8	**38.5**	.407	.396	.435	7.1	3.0	**2.6**	**1.6**	**13.1**
1997	L.A. Lakers	9	9	31.0	.447	.429	.778	5.3	1.4	1.1	.8	6.7
1998	L.A. Lakers	13	13	32.5	**.557**	.353	.683	6.5	3.1	1.1	1.1	8.6
1999	L.A. Lakers	8	0	22.1	.462	.417	.786	4.5	1.4	.8	.8	5.0
2000†	L.A. Lakers	**23**	0	26.9	.407	.288	.702	5.3	2.5	.9	.8	7.6
2001†	L.A. Lakers	16	0	23.9	.368	.362	.591	5.2	1.9	1.4	1.0	5.9
2002†	L.A. Lakers	19	14	37.0	.449	.387	.789	**8.1**	3.2	1.7	.8	9.3
2003	L.A. Lakers	12	10	31.1	.319	.053	.556	6.7	3.1	1.3	1.0	5.6
2004	San Antonio	10	0	21.1	.465	.364	**.929**	6.3	.9	.8	.2	6.1
2005†	San Antonio	**23**	0	26.9	.448	**.447**	.732	5.4	2.0	.9	.9	9.3
2006	San Antonio	13	5	17.2	.405	.353	.731	3.7	.8	.4	.7	4.2
2007†	San Antonio	18	0	20.1	.417	.351	.824	3.9	1.6	.6	1.3	4.3
2008	San Antonio	15	0	10.3	.194	.227	.667	2.1	.5	.3	.3	1.5
Career		244	116	28.0	.426	.359	.722	5.6	2.4	1.1	.9	7.9

== Personal life ==
Horry's first child, daughter Ashlyn, was diagnosed with a rare genetic disorder called 1p36 deletion syndrome, an affliction that develops when part of the first chromosome is missing. She died on June 14, 2011, at the age of 17. His older son Camron Horry played football at Texas A&M. His younger daughter Jade Horry lives in Los Angeles, California. His younger son Christian "CJ" Horry is following in his footsteps as a basketball player. CJ plays basketball at UCLA in Southern California. Horry coached his AAU Big Shot basketball team in Los Angeles. On September 29, 2019, he married his long-time girlfriend Candice Madrid. Horry appeared as himself in a 2023 episode of the television series The Lincoln Lawyer.

== See also ==
- List of NBA players with most championships
- List of NBA career playoff steals leaders
- List of NBA career playoff blocks leaders
- List of NBA career playoff 3-point scoring leaders
- List of NBA career playoff games played leaders
- List of NBA career playoff minutes leaders
