= Sean Rooks =

American basketball player and coach (1969–2016)

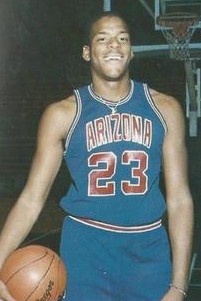
- Rooks, circa 1987

Personal information
- Born: September 9, 1969 New York City, New York, U.S.
- Died: June 7, 2016 (aged 46) Philadelphia, Pennsylvania, U.S.
- Listed height: 6 ft 10 in (2.08 m)
- Listed weight: 250 lb (113 kg)

Career information
- High school: Fontana (Fontana, California)
- College: Arizona (1988–1992)
- NBA draft: 1992: 2nd round, 30th overall pick
- Drafted by: Dallas Mavericks
- Playing career: 1992–2012
- Position: Center
- Number: 45
- Coaching career: 2007–2016

Career history

Playing
- 1992–1994: Dallas Mavericks
- 1994–1996: Minnesota Timberwolves
- 1996: Atlanta Hawks
- 1996–1999: Los Angeles Lakers
- 1999–2000: Dallas Mavericks
- 2000–2003: Los Angeles Clippers
- 2003–2004: New Orleans Hornets
- 2004: Orlando Magic
- 2005: Unicaja Málaga
- 2005: Joventut Badalona
- 2011–2012: Los Angeles Slam

Coaching
- 2007–2008: Bakersfield Jam (assistant)
- 2010–2011: New Mexico Thunderbirds (assistant)
- 2012: Sioux Falls Skyforce (assistant)
- 2012–2013: Phoenix Suns (assistant)
- 2013–2016: Sioux Falls Skyforce (assistant)
- 2014–2016: Philadelphia 76ers (assistant)

Career highlights
- First-team All-Pac-10 (1992)

Career NBA statistics
- Points: 4,676 (6.2 ppg)
- Rebounds: 2,877 (3.8 rpg)
- Blocks: 499 (0.7 bpg)
- Stats at NBA.com
- Stats at Basketball Reference

Sean Lester Rooks (September 9, 1969 – June 7, 2016) was an American professional basketball player. He played in the National Basketball Association (NBA) from 1992 to 2004, and was an Assistant for Player Development for the Philadelphia 76ers. He played college basketball for the Arizona Wildcats, earning all-conference honors in the Pac-10 (known later as the Pac-12) as a senior. Rooks died of heart disease on June 7, 2016.

== Early life ==
Sean Lester Rooks was born on September 9, 1969, in New York City, to Deborah and Roland Rooks . His father, Roland, was a standout college basketball player at Parsons College who was drafted by the New York Knicks before an injury cut his playing career short; he later became a prominent streetball referee in New York City at historic venues like Rucker Park. In 1973, Rooks and his mother moved to Los Angeles, California, where he grew up.

== Playing career ==
The 6'10" center was drafted by the Dallas Mavericks in the second round (30th overall pick) in the 1992 NBA draft. He was a starter for the Mavericks in his rookie season and then again in 1995 for the Minnesota Timberwolves. He also played for the Atlanta Hawks, the Los Angeles Lakers, the Los Angeles Clippers, the New Orleans Hornets, and the Orlando Magic. Rooks played twelve seasons in the NBA between 1992 and 2004.

== Coaching career ==
After retiring, Rooks moved into coaching and served as an assistant coach in the NBA Development League for the Bakersfield Jam (2007–2008), the New Mexico Thunderbirds (2010–2011) and the Sioux Falls Skyforce (from March 2012). In 2012, he joined the Phoenix Suns' player development staff. He resigned from the staff in January 2013 to taking a coaching position overseas. From 2014 until his death, he was an assistant coach for the Philadelphia 76ers.

== Personal life ==
Rooks had 2 children, a daughter Khayla who played for the Washington Huskies women's basketball team, and a son, Kameron, who was a member of the 2013–14 California Golden Bears men's basketball team recruiting class at the University of California, Berkeley.

== Death ==
Rooks died of heart disease in Philadelphia on June 7, 2016, hours after interviewing for a job on the New York Knicks coaching staff.
