= Kenneth C. Anderson =

Kenneth C. Anderson may refer to:

- Ken Anderson (wrestler) (born 1976), American professional wrestler
- Kenneth C. Anderson (physician), editor of the medical journal Clinical Cancer Research

== See also ==
- Kenneth Anderson (disambiguation)
