= 1997 NBA playoffs =

Postseason tournament

Tournament details
- Dates: April 24–June 13, 1997
- Season: 1996–97
- Teams: 16

Final positions
- Champions: Chicago Bulls (5th title)
- Runners-up: Utah Jazz
- Semifinalists: Houston Rockets; Miami Heat

Tournament statistics
- Scoring leader(s): Michael Jordan (Bulls) (31.1 PPG)

Awards
- MVP: Michael Jordan (Bulls)

The 1997 NBA playoffs was the postseason tournament of the National Basketball Association's 1996–97 season. The tournament concluded with the defending NBA champion and Eastern Conference champion Chicago Bulls defeating the Western Conference champion Utah Jazz 4 games to 2. This was the Bulls' second straight title, and fifth overall (They completed the 3-peat by beating Utah again in 1998). Michael Jordan was named NBA Finals MVP for the fifth time.

== Overview ==
The Minnesota Timberwolves made their playoff debut after failing to win more than 30 games in their first 7 seasons. It was also the first of 7 straight years in which they made the playoffs only to lose in the first round. They were the last of the 1988/89 expansion four to make their playoff debut.

The Phoenix Suns made the playoffs despite starting the season with 13 straight losses. Their 0–13 start is an NBA record for the most losses to start a season by a team that went on to make the postseason.

All four 1988/89 expansion teams (Minnesota, Miami, Orlando and Charlotte) made the playoffs for the first time. This would happen again in 2001.

Both eighth seeds in the 1997 Playoffs, the Washington Bullets and the Los Angeles Clippers, broke playoff droughts (Bullets eight years, Clippers only just three) with this season's playoff appearances. (The Bullets' last playoff appearance was in 1988; the Clippers in 1993). Unfortunately for both teams, it would be a long time before they made the playoffs again; the renamed Wizards made their return in 2005; the Clippers in 2006). The Bullets qualified by defeating the Cleveland Cavaliers in a regular season finale that saw both teams fighting for the #8 seed.

This season was the first, and to date only, season since the ABA–NBA merger that none of the four former ABA teams (the San Antonio Spurs, the Denver Nuggets, the Indiana Pacers, and the New Jersey Nets) qualified for the playoffs. It was also one of only four times that the Spurs failed to make the playoffs since their admission to the NBA. The Spurs would not miss the playoffs again until 2020.

The Los Angeles Memorial Sports Arena hosted its final NBA playoff game in Game 3 of the Clippers–Jazz series. When the Clippers returned to the playoffs in 2006, they had moved to the Staples Center (Now Crypto.com Arena), their home since the 1999–2000 season. The Sports Arena remained active until its closure and demolition in 2016; the site is now Banc of California Stadium, home to MLS' Los Angeles FC.

Game 3 of the Bulls–Bullets series was the last playoff game ever played at the USAir Arena. They moved into a new arena in December of the next season. It was also the final game for the Washington Bullets. They changed their team name to the Wizards on May 15, making it the last time the team was officially named the "Bullets".

With their first round victory over the Orlando Magic, the Miami Heat won a playoff series for the first time in franchise history.

Game 4 of the Bulls–Hawks series was the last game ever played at the Omni Coliseum. The Hawks' home playoff games for 1998 and 1999 were played at the Georgia Dome while the Omni was demolished to make way for what is now State Farm Arena, which would open in September 1999.

The Miami Heat became the sixth team in NBA History to come back from a 3–1 series deficit with their conference semifinals win over the New York Knicks. Ironically, their run to the Eastern Conference Finals marked the farthest they had reached in the playoffs up to that point; they did not return until 2005, and won the NBA Finals in 2006. They would not beat the Knicks again in a playoff series until 2012.

This was the first Western Conference title for the Jazz in their 23–year history, with their series win against the Houston Rockets. After losing in the Western Conference Finals to the Jazz, the Rockets would not win a playoff series until 2009 and would not return to the Conference Finals until 2015.

== Bracket ==
First Round	Conference Semifinals
E1	Chicago*	3
E8	Washington	0
E1	Chicago*	4
E4	Atlanta	1
E4	Atlanta	3
E5	Detroit	2
Eastern Conference
E3	New York	3
E6	Charlotte	0
E3	New York	3
E2	Miami*	4
E2	Miami*	3
E7	Orlando	2
W1	Utah*	3
W8	LA Clippers	0
W1	Utah*	4
W4	LA Lakers	1
W4	LA Lakers	3
W5	Portland	1
Western Conference
W3	Houston	3
W6	Minnesota	0
W3	Houston	4
W2	Seattle*	3
W2	Seattle*	3
W7	Phoenix	2

Conference Finals
E1	Chicago*	4
E2	Miami*	1
W1	Utah*	4
W3	Houston	2

NBA Finals
E1	Chicago*	4
W1	Utah*	2

- * Division winner
- Bold Series winner
- Italic Team with home-court advantage

== Playoff qualifying ==
=== Western Conference ===
==== Best record in conference ====
The Utah Jazz clinched the best record in the Western Conference, and had home court advantage throughout the Western Conference playoffs.

==== Clinched a playoff berth ====
The following teams clinched a playoff berth in the West:

1. Utah Jazz (64–18, clinched Midwest division)
2. Seattle SuperSonics (57–25, clinched Pacific division)
3. Houston Rockets (57–25)
4. Los Angeles Lakers (56–26)
5. Portland Trail Blazers (49–33)
6. Minnesota Timberwolves (40–42)
7. Phoenix Suns (40–42)
8. Los Angeles Clippers (36–46)

=== Eastern Conference ===
==== Best record in NBA ====
The Chicago Bulls clinched the best record in the NBA, and earned home court advantage throughout the entire playoffs.

==== Clinched a playoff berth ====
The following teams clinched a playoff berth in the East:

1. Chicago Bulls (69–13, clinched Central division)
2. Miami Heat (61–21, clinched Atlantic division)
3. New York Knicks (57–25)
4. Atlanta Hawks (56–26)
5. Detroit Pistons (54–28)
6. Charlotte Hornets (54–28)
7. Orlando Magic (45–37)
8. Washington Bullets (44–38)

== Memorable moments ==
The 1997 NBA Playoffs featured numerous clutch shots and other moments.

- April 30: Chicago Bulls vs. Washington Bullets, Game 3

Scottie Pippen made the series-winning dunk with 7.4 seconds left as the Bulls swept the Bullets 96–95 and advanced.

- May 1: Seattle SuperSonics vs. Phoenix Suns, Game 4

With his team trailing 107–104 with 4.3 seconds left, Phoenix guard Rex Chapman took the inbounds pass, launched a 3-point shot while falling out of bounds, and made the shot to tie the game. The Sonics would however win in OT 122–115.

- May 6: Chicago Bulls vs. Atlanta Hawks, Game 1

Scottie Pippen broke a 97–97 tie by making a 3-point shot with 43.9 seconds left. Neither team would score after that, and the Bulls beat Atlanta 100–97.

- May 14: New York Knicks vs. Miami Heat, Game 5

A courtside brawl erupted when Heat forward P.J. Brown body-slammed Knicks guard Charlie Ward causing both teams' benches to clear. For the Knicks, Patrick Ewing, John Starks, Allan Houston and Larry Johnson left the bench. All of the players involved were suspended. The Knicks, under-manned by the suspensions, lost the series in 7 games to start the Heat-Knicks rivalry. This was the first time in history where a New York-based major league sports team lost a playoff series after securing a 3–1 series lead; this would later be repeated when the New York Yankees blew a 3–0 series lead against the Boston Red Sox in 2004 and when the New York Rangers blew a 3–1 series lead against the Washington Capitals in 2009.

- May 25: Utah Jazz vs. Houston Rockets, Game 4

Eddie Johnson made a 3 as time expired to tie the Western Conference Finals at 2.

- May 29: Utah Jazz vs. Houston Rockets, Game 6

John Stockton scored 25 points and Karl Malone scored 24. John Stockton capped off a spectacular 4th quarter performance by hitting a 3 as time expired to send Utah to the NBA Finals for the first time in franchise history.

- June 1: Chicago Bulls vs. Utah Jazz, Game 1

With the game tied at 82 with 9.2 seconds left, Jazz forward Karl Malone missed two crucial free throws. Chicago regained possession and Michael Jordan hit a jumper as time expired for the Bulls to win 84–82.

- June 13: Chicago Bulls vs. Utah Jazz, Game 6

With most NBC viewers thinking Jordan would take the last shot with the game tied at 86, he instead passed to Steve Kerr, who made a 17-foot shot with 5 seconds left. On the next play, Scottie Pippen stole Bryon Russell's inbound pass and rolled the ball to Toni Kukoč, who clinched the title with a dunk.

== Notes ==
- For the first time since 1992, a #5 seed did not beat their #4 seeded opponent in the first round.
- This would be the last postseason until 2004 to feature teams with sub .500 records.
- Until 2020, this is the most recent postseason where a Western Conference team (Minnesota, Phoenix, and the Los Angeles Clippers) qualified with a losing record.

== First round ==
=== Eastern Conference first round ===
==== (1) Chicago Bulls vs. (8) Washington Bullets ====
TNT

April 25
8:00 PM

Boxscore

Washington Bullets 86, Chicago Bulls 98
Scoring by quarter: 20–24, 23–23, 13–17, 30–34
Pts: Juwan Howard 21; Rebs: Rod Strickland 10; Asts: Rod Strickland 8	Pts: Michael Jordan 29; Rebs: Scottie Pippen 10; Asts: Michael Jordan 8
Chicago leads series, 1–0

United Center, Chicago, Illinois
Attendance: 24,122
Referees: Ted Bernhardt, Joe Forte, Steve Javie

NBC

April 27
5:30 PM

Boxscore

Washington Bullets 104, Chicago Bulls 109
Scoring by quarter: 30–29, 35–29, 15–28, 24–23
Pts: Calbert Cheaney 26; Rebs: Chris Webber 12; Asts: Rod Strickland 8	Pts: Michael Jordan 55; Rebs: Scottie Pippen 9 Asts: Luc Longley 6
Chicago leads series, 2–0

United Center, Chicago, Illinois
Attendance: 24,267
Referees: Hugh Evans, Nolan Fine, Don Vaden

Michael Jordan scores 20 of the Bulls' 23 points in the fourth quarter

TNT

April 30
8:00 PM

Boxscore

Chicago Bulls 96, Washington Bullets 95
Scoring by quarter: 22–23, 26–23, 22–24, 26–25
Pts: Michael Jordan 28; Rebs: Dennis Rodman 10; Asts: Michael Jordan 6	Pts: Rod Strickland 24; Rebs: Chris Webber 8 Asts: Rod Strickland 9
Chicago wins series, 3–0

US Airways Arena, Landover, Maryland
Attendance: 18,756
Referees: Dick Bavetta, David Jones, Ken Mauer

Scottie Pippen stuffs in the series winning dunk with 7.0 seconds left

Regular-season series
Chicago won 2–1 in the regular-season series

January 14, 1997

Recap

Washington Bullets 107, Chicago Bulls 108

United Center, Chicago, Illinois

February 21, 1997

Recap

Chicago Bulls 103, Washington Bullets 99

USAir Arena, Landover, Maryland

April 3, 1997

Recap

Chicago Bulls 102, Washington Bullets 110

USAir Arena, Landover, Maryland

This was the first playoff meeting between the Bulls and the Bullets/Wizards franchise.

==== (2) Miami Heat vs. (7) Orlando Magic ====
TNT

April 24
8:00 PM

Boxscore

Orlando Magic 64, Miami Heat 99
Scoring by quarter: 10–35, 20–14, 17–24, 17–26
Pts: Derek Strong 15; Rebs: Nick Anderson 12; Asts: Penny Hardaway 3	Pts: Voshon Lenard 24; Rebs: P. J. Brown 12; Asts: Tim Hardaway 11
Miami leads series, 1–0

Miami Arena, Miami, Florida
Attendance: 15,200
Referees: Jim Clark, Joe Crawford, Eddie F. Rush

NBC

April 27
12:30 PM

Boxscore

Orlando Magic 87, Miami Heat 104
Scoring by quarter: 18–20, 13–36, 27–24, 29–24
Pts: Penny Hardaway 26; Rebs: Derek Strong 16; Asts: Brian Shaw 4	Pts: Tim Hardaway 20; Rebs: Alonzo Mourning 9 Asts: Tim Hardaway 11
Miami leads series, 2–0

Miami Arena, Miami, Florida
Attendance: 15,200
Referees: Hue Hollins, Ken Mauer, Jack Nies

TBS

April 29
7:00 PM

Boxscore

Miami Heat 75, Orlando Magic 88
Scoring by quarter: 29–13, 13–29, 15–23, 18–23
Pts: Alonzo Mourning 17; Rebs: Alonzo Mourning 17; Asts: Tim Hardaway 8	Pts: Penny Hardaway 42; Rebs: Penny Hardaway 8 Asts: Darrell Armstrong 8
Miami leads series, 2–1

Orlando Arena, Orlando, Florida
Attendance: 17,248
Referees: Joe DeRosa, Luis Grillo, Steve Javie

TNT

May 1
8:00 PM

Boxscore

Miami Heat 91, Orlando Magic 99
Scoring by quarter: 25–27, 14–26, 25–20, 27–26
Pts: Alonzo Mourning 23; Rebs: Mourning, Brown 13 each Asts: Tim Hardaway 8	Pts: Penny Hardaway 41; Rebs: Darrell Armstrong 9 Asts: Penny Hardaway 4
Series tied, 2–2

Orlando Arena, Orlando, Florida
Attendance: 16,555
Referees: Ted Bernhardt, Ron Garretson, Ed T. Rush

NBC

May 4
12:30 PM

Boxscore

Orlando Magic 83, Miami Heat 91
Scoring by quarter: 20–22, 14–19, 19–28, 30–22
Pts: Penny Hardaway 33; Rebs: Derek Strong 12; Asts: Penny Hardaway 6	Pts: Alonzo Mourning 22; Rebs: P. J. Brown 14; Asts: Tim Hardaway 11
Miami wins series, 3–2

Miami Arena, Miami, Florida
Attendance: 15,200
Referees: Dick Bavetta, Joe Forte, Bill Oakes

Regular-season series
Tied 2–2 in the regular-season series

December 26, 1996

Recap

Orlando Magic 76, Miami Heat 96

Miami Arena, Miami

January 19, 1997

Recap

Orlando Magic 99, Miami Heat 87

Miami Arena, Miami

February 26, 1997

Recap

Miami Heat 86, Orlando Magic 98

Orlando Arena, Orlando, Florida

April 19, 1997

Recap

Miami Heat 102, Orlando Magic 88

Orlando Arena, Orlando, Florida

This was the first playoff meeting between the Heat and the Magic as well as the first postseason meeting between two Florida-based professional sports teams.

==== (3) New York Knicks vs. (6) Charlotte Hornets ====
TBS

April 24
7:00 PM

Boxscore

Charlotte Hornets 99, New York Knicks 109
Scoring by quarter: 23–30, 23–29, 29–16, 24–34
Pts: Vlade Divac 27; Rebs: Anthony Mason 13; Asts: Anthony Mason 5	Pts: Allan Houston 25; Rebs: Patrick Ewing 9 Asts: Chris Childs 8
New York leads series, 1–0

Madison Square Garden, New York City, New York
Attendance: 19,763
Referees: Hugh Evans, Nolan Fine, Don Vaden

NBC

April 26
1:00 PM

Boxscore

Charlotte Hornets 93, New York Knicks 100
Scoring by quarter: 24–24, 23–24, 34–31, 12–21
Pts: Glen Rice 39; Rebs: Mason, Divac 12 each Asts: four players 2 each	Pts: Patrick Ewing 30; Rebs: Charles Oakley 10; Asts: Chris Childs 9
New York leads series, 2–0

Madison Square Garden, New York City, New York
Attendance: 19,763
Referees: Jim Clark, Joe Crawford, Eddie F. Rush

TNT

April 28
8:00 PM

Boxscore

New York Knicks 104, Charlotte Hornets 95
Scoring by quarter: 38–31, 20–18, 21–24, 25–22
Pts: Larry Johnson 22; Rebs: Patrick Ewing 11; Asts: Johnson, Childs 5 each	Pts: Glen Rice 22; Rebs: Anthony Mason 11; Asts: Glen Rice 9
New York wins series, 3–0

Charlotte Coliseum, Charlotte, North Carolina
Attendance: 24,042
Referees: Dan Crawford, Joe Forte, David Jones

Regular-season series
Charlotte won 3–1 in the regular-season series

November 3, 1996

Recap

Charlotte Hornets 86, New York Knicks 113

Madison Square Garden, New York City

November 20, 1996

Recap

New York Knicks 86, Charlotte Hornets 93

Charlotte Coliseum, Charlotte, North Carolina

January 24, 1997

Recap

New York Knicks 104, Charlotte Hornets 113

Charlotte Coliseum, Charlotte, North Carolina

February 2, 1997

Recap

Charlotte Hornets 99, New York Knicks 93

Madison Square Garden, New York City

This was the second playoff meeting between these two teams, with the Knicks winning the first meeting.

Previous playoff series
New York leads 1–0 in all-time playoff series

1993

Charlotte Hornets 1, New York Knicks 4

1993 Eastern Conference Semifinals

==== (4) Atlanta Hawks vs. (5) Detroit Pistons ====
TBS

April 25
7:00 PM

Boxscore

Detroit Pistons 75, Atlanta Hawks 89
Scoring by quarter: 18–20, 25–19, 15–22, 17–28
Pts: Grant Hill 20; Rebs: Grant Hill 14; Asts: Grant Hill 7	Pts: Dikembe Mutombo 26; Rebs: Dikembe Mutombo 15; Asts: Christian Laettner 4
Atlanta leads series, 1–0

Omni Coliseum, Atlanta, Georgia
Attendance: 15,795
Referees: Luis Grillo, Hue Hollins, Jack Nies

TNT

April 27
8:00 PM

Boxscore

Detroit Pistons 93, Atlanta Hawks 80
Scoring by quarter: 26–20, 19–20, 19–25, 29–15
Pts: Grant Hill 25; Rebs: Otis Thorpe 8 Asts: Grant Hill 3	Pts: Steve Smith 22; Rebs: Mookie Blaylock 9 Asts: Mookie Blaylock 7
Series tied, 1–1

Omni Coliseum, Atlanta, Georgia
Attendance: 16,378
Referees: Joe DeRosa, Steve Javie, Ron Olesiak

TNT

April 29
8:00 PM

Boxscore

Atlanta Hawks 91, Detroit Pistons 99
Scoring by quarter: 20–24, 20–32, 26–16, 25–27
Pts: Christian Laettner 25; Rebs: Dikembe Mutombo 21; Asts: Mookie Blaylock 10	Pts: Lindsey Hunter 26; Rebs: Terry Mills 7 Asts: Grant Hill 8
Detroit leads series, 2–1

The Palace of Auburn Hills, Auburn Hills, Michigan
Attendance: 20,059
Referees: Mike Callahan, Bill Oakes, Bennett Salvatore

TNT

May 2
8:00 PM

Boxscore

Atlanta Hawks 94, Detroit Pistons 82
Scoring by quarter: 22–23, 24–15, 27–19, 21–25
Pts: Steve Smith 28; Rebs: Mutombo, Laettner 12 each Asts: Mookie Blaylock 9	Pts: Grant Hill 28; Rebs: Terry Mills 10; Asts: three players 3 each
Series tied, 2–2

The Palace of Auburn Hills, Auburn Hills, Michigan
Attendance: 21,454
Referees: Dick Bavetta, Jim Clark, Bob Delaney

NBC

May 4

Boxscore

Detroit Pistons 79, Atlanta Hawks 84
Scoring by quarter: 25–22, 17–20, 20–12, 17–30
Pts: Grant Hill 21; Rebs: Lindsey Hunter 9 Asts: Grant Hill 6	Pts: Christian Laettner 23; Rebs: Mutombo, Blaylock 9 each Asts: Blaylock, Corbin 5 each
Atlanta wins series, 3–2

Omni Coliseum, Atlanta, Georgia
Attendance: 16,378
Referees: Dan Crawford, Ed T. Rush, Don Vaden

Regular-season series
Detroit won 3–1 in the regular-season series

November 2, 1996

Recap

Detroit Pistons 90, Atlanta Hawks 78

The Omni, Atlanta

December 4, 1996

Recap

Atlanta Hawks 90, Detroit Pistons 100

The Palace of Auburn Hills, Auburn Hills, Michigan

March 2, 1997

Recap

Atlanta Hawks 75, Detroit Pistons 82

The Palace of Auburn Hills, Auburn Hills, Michigan

April 4, 1997

Recap

Detroit Pistons 89, Atlanta Hawks 103

The Omni, Atlanta

This was the seventh playoff meeting between these two teams, with each team winning three series apiece.

Previous playoff series
Tied 3–3 in all-time playoff series

1956

Fort Wayne Pistons 3, St. Louis Hawks 2

1956 Western Division Finals

1958

Detroit Pistons 1, St. Louis Hawks 4

1958 Western Division Finals

1963

Detroit Pistons 1, St. Louis Hawks 3

1963 Western Division Semifinals

1986

Atlanta Hawks 3, Detroit Pistons 1

1986 Eastern Conference First Round

1987

Atlanta Hawks 1, Detroit Pistons 4

1987 Eastern Conference Semifinals

1991

Atlanta Hawks 2, Detroit Pistons 3

1991 Eastern Conference First Round

=== Western Conference first round ===
==== (1) Utah Jazz vs. (8) Los Angeles Clippers ====
TNT

April 24
10:30 PM

Boxscore

Los Angeles Clippers 86, Utah Jazz 106
Scoring by quarter: 24–31, 24–23, 20–26, 18–26
Pts: Loy Vaught 20; Rebs: Loy Vaught 11; Asts: three players 3 each	Pts: Karl Malone 27; Rebs: Karl Malone 10; Asts: John Stockton 17
Utah leads series, 1–0

Delta Center, Salt Lake City, Utah
Attendance: 19,911
Referees: Dan Crawford, Ron Garretson, Ed Middleton

TNT

April 26
8:00 PM

Boxscore

Los Angeles Clippers 99, Utah Jazz 105
Scoring by quarter: 22–27, 23–34, 32–23, 22–21
Pts: Lorenzen Wright 17; Rebs: Loy Vaught 9 Asts: Darrick Martin 6	Pts: Karl Malone 39; Rebs: Karl Malone 11; Asts: Stockton, Hornacek 4 each
Utah leads series, 2–0

Delta Center, Salt Lake City, Utah
Attendance: 19,911
Referees: Terry Durham, Bill Oakes, Bennett Salvatore

TNT

April 28
10:30 PM

Boxscore

Utah Jazz 104, Los Angeles Clippers 92
Scoring by quarter: 32–24, 26–18, 22–21, 24–29
Pts: Karl Malone 26; Rebs: Karl Malone 13; Asts: John Stockton 13	Pts: Loy Vaught 20; Rebs: Vaught, Wright 9 each Asts: Darrick Martin 5
Utah wins series, 3–0

Los Angeles Memorial Sports Arena, Los Angeles, California
Attendance: 11,747
Referees: Bob Delaney, Tommy Nunez Sr., Ed T. Rush

Regular-season series
Utah won 3–1 in the regular-season series

November 2, 1996

Recap

Utah Jazz 95, Los Angeles Clippers 90

Los Angeles Memorial Sports Arena, Los Angeles

November 29, 1996

Recap

Los Angeles Clippers 94, Utah Jazz 111

Delta Center, Salt Lake City

December 30, 1996

Recap

Utah Jazz 101, Los Angeles Clippers 115

Los Angeles Memorial Sports Arena, Los Angeles

March 22, 1997

Recap

Los Angeles Clippers 94, Utah Jazz 107

Delta Center, Salt Lake City

This was the second playoff meeting between these two teams, with the Jazz winning the first meeting.

Previous playoff series
Utah leads 1–0 in all-time playoff series

1992

Los Angeles Clippers 2, Utah Jazz 3

1992 Western Conference First Round

==== (2) Seattle SuperSonics vs. (7) Phoenix Suns ====
TBS

April 25
9:30 PM

Boxscore

Phoenix Suns 106, Seattle SuperSonics 101
Scoring by quarter: 20–23, 31–24, 26–32, 29–22
Pts: Rex Chapman 42; Rebs: Kevin Johnson 7 Asts: Jason Kidd 10	Pts: Gary Payton 23; Rebs: Shawn Kemp 15; Asts: Gary Payton 9
Phoenix leads series, 1–0

KeyArena, Seattle, Washington
Attendance: 17,072
Referees: Bob Delaney, Ed T. Rush, Tom Washington

TNT

April 27
10:30 PM

Boxscore

Phoenix Suns 78, Seattle SuperSonics 122
Scoring by quarter: 18–35, 19–21, 26–29, 15–37
Pts: Rex Chapman 18; Rebs: Wesley Person 10; Asts: Jason Kidd 8	Pts: Payton, Kemp 23 each Rebs: Shawn Kemp 15; Asts: Gary Payton 6
Series tied, 1–1

KeyArena, Seattle, Washington
Attendance: 17,072
Referees: Dick Bavetta, Joe Borgia, Bernie Fryer

TNT

April 29
10:30 PM

Boxscore

Seattle SuperSonics 103, Phoenix Suns 110
Scoring by quarter: 40–30, 22–27, 19–25, 22–28
Pts: Gary Payton 34; Rebs: Shawn Kemp 11; Asts: Gary Payton 6	Pts: Wesley Person 29; Rebs: Wesley Person 10; Asts: Jason Kidd 10
Phoenix leads series, 2–1

America West Arena, Phoenix, Arizona
Attendance: 19,023
Referees: Joe Crawford, Eddie F. Rush, Greg Willard

TNT

May 1
10:30 PM

Boxscore

Seattle SuperSonics 122, Phoenix Suns 115 (OT)
Scoring by quarter: 36–26, 25–23, 17–27, 29–31, Overtime: 15–8
Pts: Gary Payton 28; Rebs: Shawn Kemp 20; Asts: Gary Payton 14	Pts: Johnson, Kidd 23 each Rebs: Danny Manning 10; Asts: Jason Kidd 14
Series tied, 2–2

America West Arena, Phoenix, Arizona
Attendance: 19,023
Referees: Dan Crawford, Joe Forte, Tommy Nunez Sr.

NBC

May 3
3:30 PM

Boxscore

Phoenix Suns 92, Seattle SuperSonics 116
Scoring by quarter: 23–33, 18–30, 32–18, 19–35
Pts: Wesley Person 26; Rebs: Person, Kidd 8 each Asts: Jason Kidd 7	Pts: Detlef Schrempf 24; Rebs: Shawn Kemp 11; Asts: Gary Payton 10
Seattle wins series, 3–2

KeyArena, Seattle, Washington
Attendance: 17,072
Referees: Hugh Evans, Hue Hollins, Jack Nies

Regular-season series
Tied 2–2 in the regular-season series

November 7, 1996

Recap

Seattle SuperSonics 103, Phoenix Suns 98

America West Arena, Phoenix, Arizona

November 29, 1996

Recap

Phoenix Suns 92, Seattle SuperSonics 105

KeyArena, Seattle

March 26, 1997

Recap

Phoenix Suns 109, Seattle SuperSonics 107

KeyArena, Seattle

March 30, 1997

Recap

Seattle SuperSonics 106, Phoenix Suns 107

America West Arena, Phoenix, Arizona

This was the fourth playoff meeting between these two teams, with the Suns winning two of the first three meetings.

Previous playoff series
Phoenix leads 2–1 in all-time playoff series

1976

Phoenix Suns 4, Seattle SuperSonics 2

1976 Western Conference Semifinals

1979

Phoenix Suns 3, Seattle SuperSonics 4

1979 Western Conference Finals

1993

Phoenix Suns 4, Seattle SuperSonics 3

1993 Western Conference Finals

==== (3) Houston Rockets vs. (6) Minnesota Timberwolves ====
TBS

April 24
9:30 PM

Boxscore

Minnesota Timberwolves 95, Houston Rockets 112
Scoring by quarter: 25–31, 23–30, 17–27, 30–24
Pts: Stephon Marbury 28; Rebs: Kevin Garnett 9 Asts: three players 4 each	Pts: Mario Elie 21; Rebs: Kevin Willis 13; Asts: Clyde Drexler 8
Houston leads series, 1–0

The Summit, Houston, Texas
Attendance: 16,285
Referees: Bill Oakes, Ron Olesiak, Bennett Salvatore

NBC

April 26
3:30 PM

Boxscore

Minnesota Timberwolves 84, Houston Rockets 96
Scoring by quarter: 20–24, 23–17, 22–25, 19–30
Pts: Stephon Marbury 22; Rebs: Dean Garrett 14; Asts: Stephon Marbury 6	Pts: Charles Barkley 20; Rebs: Charles Barkley 15; Asts: Clyde Drexler 7
Houston leads series, 2–0

The Summit, Houston, Texas
Attendance: 16,285
Referees: Dan Crawford, Ron Garretson, Derrick Stafford

TBS

April 29
9:30 PM

Boxscore

Houston Rockets 125, Minnesota Timberwolves 120
Scoring by quarter: 32–29, 27–30, 32–32, 34–29
Pts: Matt Maloney 26; Rebs: Hakeem Olajuwon 11; Asts: Clyde Drexler 9	Pts: Tom Gugliotta 27; Rebs: Dean Garrett 15; Asts: Stephon Marbury 13
Houston wins series, 3–0

Target Center, Minneapolis, Minnesota
Attendance: 19,006
Referees: Terry Durham, Hue Hollins, Jack Nies

Regular-season series
Houston won 4–0 in the regular-season series

November 19, 1996

Recap

Minnesota Timberwolves 93, Houston Rockets 122

The Summit, Houston, Texas

December 10, 1996

Recap

Houston Rockets 96, Minnesota Timberwolves 94

Target Center, Minneapolis

January 7, 1997

Recap

Houston Rockets 104, Minnesota Timberwolves 95

Target Center, Minneapolis

March 25, 1997

Recap

Minnesota Timberwolves 103, Houston Rockets 112

The Summit, Houston, Texas

This was the first playoff meeting between the Rockets and the Timberwolves.

==== (4) Los Angeles Lakers vs. (5) Portland Trail Blazers ====
TNT

April 25
10:30 PM

Boxscore

Portland Trail Blazers 77, Los Angeles Lakers 95
Scoring by quarter: 24–22, 16—21, 22–25, 15–27
Pts: Wallace, Sabonis 18 each Rebs: Chris Dudley 11; Asts: Isaiah Rider 5	Pts: Shaquille O'Neal 46; Rebs: Shaquille O'Neal 11; Asts: Nick Van Exel 8
LA Lakers lead series, 1–0

Great Western Forum, Inglewood, California
Attendance: 17,505
Referees: Dick Bavetta, Bernie Fryer, Greg Willard

NBC

April 27
3:00 PM

Boxscore

Portland Trail Blazers 93, Los Angeles Lakers 107
Scoring by quarter: 26–33, 25–16, 18–29, 24–29
Pts: Rasheed Wallace 20; Rebs: Clifford Robinson 10; Asts: Kenny Anderson 7	Pts: Shaquille O'Neal 30; Rebs: Eddie Jones 7 Asts: Nick Van Exel 9
LA Lakers lead series, 2–0

Great Western Forum, Inglewood, California
Attendance: 17,505
Referees: Bob Delaney, Ed T. Rush, Tom Washington

TNT

April 30
10:30 PM

Boxscore

Los Angeles Lakers 90, Portland Trail Blazers 98
Scoring by quarter: 17–32, 19–27, 22–25, 32–14
Pts: Shaquille O'Neal 29; Rebs: Shaquille O'Neal 12; Asts: O'Neal, Van Exel 4 each	Pts: Kenny Anderson 30; Rebs: Chris Dudley 7 Asts: Kenny Anderson 5
LA Lakers lead series, 2–1

Rose Garden, Portland, Oregon
Attendance: 21,538
Referees: Hugh Evans, Ed Middleton, Derrick Stafford

TNT

May 2
10:30 PM

Boxscore

Los Angeles Lakers 95, Portland Trail Blazers 91
Scoring by quarter: 21–19, 23–30, 24–25, 27–17
Pts: O'Neal, Campbell 27 each Rebs: four players 8 each Asts: Van Exel, Jones 5 each	Pts: Arvydas Sabonis 23; Rebs: Arvydas Sabonis 10; Asts: Kenny Anderson 5
LA Lakers win series, 3–1

Rose Garden, Portland, Oregon
Attendance: 21,538
Referees: Joe DeRosa, Steve Javie, Bennett Salvatore

Regular-season series
Portland won 3–1 in the regular-season series

December 13, 1996

Recap

Portland Trail Blazers 119, Los Angeles Lakers 120

Great Western Forum, Inglewood, California

January 6, 1997

Recap

Los Angeles Lakers 84, Portland Trail Blazers 88

Rose Garden, Portland, Oregon

January 16, 1997

Recap

Portland Trail Blazers 102, Los Angeles Lakers 98

Great Western Forum, Inglewood, California

April 20, 1997

Recap

Los Angeles Lakers 96, Portland Trail Blazers 100

Rose Garden, Portland, Oregon

This was the seventh playoff meeting between these two teams, with the Lakers winning four of the first six meetings.

Previous playoff series
Los Angeles leads 4–2 in all-time playoff series

1977

Los Angeles Lakers 0, Portland Trail Blazers 4

1977 Western Conference Finals

1983

Los Angeles Lakers 4, Portland Trail Blazers 1

1983 Western Conference Semifinals

1985

Los Angeles Lakers 4, Portland Trail Blazers 1

1985 Western Conference Semifinals

1989

Los Angeles Lakers 3, Portland Trail Blazers 0

1989 Western Conference First Round

1991

Los Angeles Lakers 4, Portland Trail Blazers 2

1991 Western Conference Finals

1992

Los Angeles Lakers 1, Portland Trail Blazers 3

1992 Western Conference First Round

== Conference semifinals ==
=== Eastern Conference semifinals ===
==== (1) Chicago Bulls vs. (4) Atlanta Hawks ====
TNT

May 6
8:00 PM

Boxscore

Atlanta Hawks 97, Chicago Bulls 100
Scoring by quarter: 26–19, 24–20, 20–38, 27–23
Pts: Mookie Blaylock 31; Rebs: Mookie Blaylock 12; Asts: Christian Laettner 6	Pts: Michael Jordan 34; Rebs: Michael Jordan 11; Asts: Michael Jordan 6
Chicago leads series, 1–0

United Center, Chicago, Illinois
Attendance: 24,397
Referees: Joe Crawford, Ron Garretson, Tommy Nunez Sr.

Scottie Pippen hits the game winning 3 with 43.9 seconds remaining

TNT

May 8
8:00 PM

Boxscore

Atlanta Hawks 103, Chicago Bulls 95
Scoring by quarter: 27–28, 26–23, 23–19, 27–25
Pts: Steve Smith 27; Rebs: Dikembe Mutombo 15; Asts: Mookie Blaylock 9	Pts: Michael Jordan 27; Rebs: Michael Jordan 16; Asts: Scottie Pippen 9
Series tied, 1–1

United Center, Chicago, Illinois
Attendance: 24,544
Referees: Nolan Fine, Steve Javie, Eddie F. Rush

NBC

May 10
1:00 PM

Boxscore

Chicago Bulls 100, Atlanta Hawks 80
Scoring by quarter: 20–24, 26–28, 25–16, 29–12
Pts: Michael Jordan 21; Rebs: Jason Caffey 11; Asts: Kukoč, Pippen 5 each	Pts: Dikembe Mutombo 16; Rebs: Dikembe Mutombo 13; Asts: Mookie Blaylock 6
Chicago leads series, 2–1

Omni Coliseum, Atlanta, Georgia
Attendance: 16,378
Referees: Bob Delaney, Hugh Evans, Derrick Stafford

NBC

May 11
5:30 PM

Boxscore

Chicago Bulls 89, Atlanta Hawks 80
Scoring by quarter: 33–19, 22–23, 20–11, 14–27
Pts: Michael Jordan 27; Rebs: Jordan, Pippen 8 each Asts: three players 4	Pts: Christian Laettner 21; Rebs: Christian Laettner 12; Asts: Mookie Blaylock 4
Chicago leads series, 3–1

Omni Coliseum, Atlanta, Georgia
Attendance: 16,378
Referees: Joe DeRosa, Hue Hollins, Bennett Salvatore

Game 4 was Robert Parish's final NBA game.

TNT

May 13
9:30 PM

Boxscore

Atlanta Hawks 92, Chicago Bulls 107
Scoring by quarter: 27–33, 17–27, 24–19, 24–28
Pts: Christian Laettner 23; Rebs: Dikembe Mutombo 12; Asts: Mookie Blaylock 8	Pts: Michael Jordan 24; Rebs: Dele, Longley 10 each Asts: Jordan, Pippen 7 each
Chicago wins series, 4–1

United Center, Chicago, Illinois
Attendance: 24,544
Referees: Joe Forte, Ken Mauer, Ed T. Rush

Regular-season series
Chicago won 3–1 in the regular-season series

November 16, 1996

Recap

Atlanta Hawks 69, Chicago Bulls 97

United Center, Chicago, Illinois

December 26, 1996

Recap

Chicago Bulls 103, Atlanta Hawks 108

The Omni, Atlanta

February 14, 1997

Recap

Chicago Bulls 89, Atlanta Hawks 88

The Omni, Atlanta

March 15, 1997

Recap

Atlanta Hawks 79, Chicago Bulls 99

United Center, Chicago, Illinois

This was the fourth playoff meeting between these two teams, with the Hawks winning two of the first three meetings.

Previous playoff series
Atlanta/St. Louis leads 2–1 in all-time playoff series

1967

St. Louis Hawks 3, Chicago Bulls 0

1967 Western Division Semifinals

1970

Atlanta Hawks 4, Chicago Bulls 1

1970 Western Division Semifinals

1993

Atlanta Hawks 0, Chicago Bulls 3

1993 Eastern Conference First Round

==== (2) Miami Heat vs. (3) New York Knicks ====
TNT

May 7
7:00 PM

Boxscore

New York Knicks 88, Miami Heat 79
Scoring by quarter: 23–23, 14–16, 29–16, 22–24
Pts: Allan Houston 27; Rebs: Patrick Ewing 16; Asts: Johnson, Ward 5 each	Pts: Tim Hardaway 21; Rebs: P. J. Brown 12; Asts: Tim Hardaway 6
New York leads series, 1–0

Miami Arena, Miami, Florida
Attendance: 14,870
Referees: Hugh Evans, Bennett Salvatore, Don Vaden

TNT

May 9
8:00 PM

Boxscore

New York Knicks 84, Miami Heat 88
Scoring by quarter: 25–20, 17–28, 27–22, 15–18
Pts: Allan Houston 19; Rebs: Patrick Ewing 11; Asts: Chris Childs 7	Pts: Tim Hardaway 34; Rebs: Alonzo Mourning 13; Asts: Hardaway, Majerle 4 each
Series tied, 1–1

Miami Arena, Miami, Florida
Attendance: 14,870
Referees: Hugh Evans, Ron Garretson, Ed Middleton

NBC

May 11
12:30 PM

Boxscore

Miami Heat 73, New York Knicks 77
Scoring by quarter: 24–16, 18–18, 17–24, 14–19
Pts: Voshon Lenard 22; Rebs: P. J. Brown 10; Asts: Tim Hardaway 8	Pts: Patrick Ewing 25; Rebs: Ewing, Oakley 11 each Asts: Ward, Starks 4 each
New York leads series, 2–1

Madison Square Garden, New York City, New York
Attendance: 19,763
Referees: Joe Crawford, Bernie Fryer, Eddie F. Rush

Patrick Ewing blocked a last second three pointer to preserve the victory.

TNT

May 12
8:00 PM

Boxscore

Miami Heat 76, New York Knicks 89
Scoring by quarter: 22–23, 14–28, 16–17, 24–21
Pts: Tim Hardaway 14; Rebs: P. J. Brown 12; Asts: Willie Anderson 4	Pts: John Starks 21; Rebs: Charles Oakley 9 Asts: Chris Childs 8
New York leads series, 3–1

Madison Square Garden, New York City, New York
Attendance: 19,763
Referees: Dan Crawford, Bob Delaney, Jack Nies

TNT

May 14
8:00 PM

Boxscore

New York Knicks 81, Miami Heat 96
Scoring by quarter: 22–21, 12–14, 25–31, 22–30
Pts: Patrick Ewing 19; Rebs: Charles Oakley 9 Asts: Chris Childs 7	Pts: Voshon Lenard 21; Rebs: P. J. Brown 12; Asts: Tim Hardaway 6
New York leads series, 3–2

Miami Arena, Miami, Florida
Attendance: 14,782
Referees: Dick Bavetta, Nolan Fine, Bill Oakes

This game featured a fight between P. J. Brown and Charlie Ward, with John Starks, Larry Johnson, Patrick Ewing, and Allan Houston leaving the bench. Brown was suspended for the rest of the series; Ewing, Houston, and Ward were suspended for Game 6; Johnson and Starks were suspended for Game 7.

TNT

May 16
8:00 PM

Boxscore

Miami Heat 95, New York Knicks 90
Scoring by quarter: 17–27, 23–17, 24–22, 31–24
Pts: Alonzo Mourning 28; Rebs: Alonzo Mourning 9 Asts: Tim Hardaway 8	Pts: Chris Childs 22; Rebs: Charles Oakley 12; Asts: Chris Childs 9
Series tied, 3–3

Madison Square Garden, New York City, New York
Attendance: 19,763
Referees: Jim Clark, Joe Forte, Ed T. Rush

NBC

May 18
3:30 PM

Boxscore

New York Knicks 90, Miami Heat 101
Scoring by quarter: 14–25, 18–24, 22–22, 36–30
Pts: Patrick Ewing 37; Rebs: Patrick Ewing 17; Asts: Charlie Ward 8	Pts: Tim Hardaway 38; Rebs: Alonzo Mourning 12; Asts: Tim Hardaway 7
Miami wins series, 4–3

Miami Arena, Miami, Florida
Attendance: 14,870
Referees: Dan Crawford, Joe Crawford, Jack Nies

Miami becomes the 6th team in NBA history to come back from a 3–1 series deficit.

Regular-season series
New York won 3–1 in the regular-season series

December 3, 1996

Recap

Miami Heat 99, New York Knicks 75

Madison Square Garden, New York City

December 6, 1996

Recap

New York Knicks 103, Miami Heat 85

Miami Arena, Miami

January 26, 1997

Recap

Miami Heat 89, New York Knicks 95

Madison Square Garden, New York City

April 12, 1997

Recap

New York Knicks 100, Miami Heat 99

Miami Arena, Miami

This was the first playoff meeting between the Heat and the Knicks.

=== Western Conference semifinals ===
==== (1) Utah Jazz vs. (4) Los Angeles Lakers ====
NBC

May 4
5:30 PM

Boxscore

Los Angeles Lakers 77, Utah Jazz 93
Scoring by quarter: 25–27, 15–25, 20–18, 17–23
Pts: Nick Van Exel 23; Rebs: Shaquille O'Neal 12; Asts: Nick Van Exel 4	Pts: Karl Malone 23; Rebs: Karl Malone 13; Asts: Jeff Hornacek 7
Utah leads series, 1–0

Delta Center, Salt Lake City, Utah
Attendance: 19,911
Referees: Joe Crawford, Bernie Fryer, Eddie F. Rush

TNT

May 6
10:30 PM

Boxscore

Los Angeles Lakers 101, Utah Jazz 103
Scoring by quarter: 24–27, 31–32, 30–28, 16–16
Pts: Shaquille O'Neal 25; Rebs: Shaquille O'Neal 12; Asts: Nick Van Exel 12	Pts: Karl Malone 31; Rebs: Karl Malone 11; Asts: Hornacek, Stockton 7 each
Utah leads series, 2–0

Delta Center, Salt Lake City, Utah
Attendance: 19,911
Referees: Jim Clark, Hue Hollins, Jack Nies

TNT

May 8
10:30 PM

Boxscore

Utah Jazz 84, Los Angeles Lakers 104
Scoring by quarter: 21–29, 15–20, 23–23, 25–32
Pts: Jeff Hornacek 26; Rebs: Karl Malone 10; Asts: John Stockton 8	Pts: Kobe Bryant 19; Rebs: Shaquille O'Neal 10; Asts: Nick Van Exel 5
Utah leads series, 2–1

Great Western Forum, Inglewood, California
Attendance: 17,505
Referees: Dick Bavetta, Terry Durham, Bill Oakes

NBC

May 10
3:30 PM

Boxscore

Utah Jazz 110, Los Angeles Lakers 95
Scoring by quarter: 25–22, 26–22, 28–25, 31–26
Pts: Karl Malone 42; Rebs: Bryon Russell 10; Asts: John Stockton 11	Pts: Shaquille O'Neal 34; Rebs: Shaquille O'Neal 11; Asts: Nick Van Exel 7
Utah leads series, 3–1

Great Western Forum, Inglewood, California
Attendance: 17,505
Referees: Joe Forte, Ken Mauer, Ed T. Rush

TNT

May 12
10:30 PM

Boxscore

Los Angeles Lakers 93, Utah Jazz 98 (OT)
Scoring by quarter: 25–31, 20–22, 16–13, 28–23, Overtime: 4–9
Pts: Nick Van Exel 26; Rebs: Shaquille O'Neal 13; Asts: Shaquille O'Neal 5	Pts: Karl Malone 32; Rebs: Karl Malone 20; Asts: John Stockton 10
Utah wins series, 4–1

Delta Center, Salt Lake City, Utah
Attendance: 19,911
Referees: Hugh Evans, Ron Garretson, Derrick Stafford

In Game 5, Kobe Bryant had an infamous rookie moment in which he airballed 4 jump shots from the end of regulation through the end of overtime.

Regular-season series
Utah won 3–1 in the regular-season series

November 20, 1996

Recap

Utah Jazz 113, Los Angeles Lakers 97

Great Western Forum, Inglewood, California

December 4, 1996

Recap

Los Angeles Lakers 75, Utah Jazz 101

Delta Center, Salt Lake City

April 9, 1997

Recap

Los Angeles Lakers 89, Utah Jazz 101

Delta Center, Salt Lake City

April 13, 1997

Recap

Utah Jazz 98, Los Angeles Lakers 100

Great Western Forum, Inglewood, California

This was the second playoff meeting between these two teams, with the Lakers winning the first meeting.

Previous playoff series
Los Angeles leads 1–0 in all-time playoff series

1988

Los Angeles Lakers 4, Utah Jazz 3

1988 Western Conference Semifinals

==== (2) Seattle SuperSonics vs. (3) Houston Rockets ====
TNT

May 5
8:00 PM

Boxscore

Seattle SuperSonics 102, Houston Rockets 112
Scoring by quarter: 25–35, 30–29, 16–32, 31–16
Pts: Shawn Kemp 24; Rebs: Shawn Kemp 11; Asts: Eric Snow 7	Pts: Clyde Drexler 22; Rebs: Hakeem Olajuwon 11; Asts: Mario Elie 8
Houston leads series, 1–0

The Summit, Houston, Texas
Attendance: 16,285
Referees: Steve Javie, Ron Olesiak, Bennett Salvatore

TNT

May 7
9:30 PM

Boxscore

Seattle SuperSonics 106, Houston Rockets 101
Scoring by quarter: 32–30, 33–17, 17–23, 24–31
Pts: Shawn Kemp 22; Rebs: Shawn Kemp 15; Asts: Gary Payton 9	Pts: Clyde Drexler 25; Rebs: Hakeem Olajuwon 12; Asts: Clyde Drexler 8
Series tied, 1–1

The Summit, Houston, Texas
Attendance: 16,285
Referees: Joe Forte, Ed Middleton, Ed T. Rush

TNT

May 9
10:30 PM

Boxscore

Houston Rockets 97, Seattle SuperSonics 93
Scoring by quarter: 29–21, 26–23, 17–35, 25–14
Pts: Hakeem Olajuwon 24; Rebs: Hakeem Olajuwon 11; Asts: Sedale Threatt 5	Pts: Payton, Kemp 28 each Rebs: Shawn Kemp 10; Asts: Payton, Kemp 5 each
Houston leads series, 2–1

KeyArena, Seattle, Washington
Attendance: 17,072
Referees: Jim Clark, Dan Crawford, Jack Nies

NBC

May 11
3:00 PM

Boxscore

Houston Rockets 110, Seattle SuperSonics 106 (OT)
Scoring by quarter: 23–25, 24–28, 27–24, 24–21, Overtime: 12–8
Pts: Maloney, Barkley 26 each Rebs: Charles Barkley 15; Asts: Hakeem Olajuwon 9	Pts: Gary Payton 27; Rebs: Kemp, Cummings 9 each Asts: Gary Payton 11
Houston leads series, 3–1

KeyArena, Seattle, Washington
Attendance: 17,072
Referees: Dick Bavetta, Bill Oakes, Don Vaden

TNT

May 13
7:00 PM

Boxscore

Seattle SuperSonics 100, Houston Rockets 94
Scoring by quarter: 27–19, 30–33, 22–19, 21–23
Pts: Hersey Hawkins 23; Rebs: Shawn Kemp 10; Asts: Gary Payton 11	Pts: Hakeem Olajuwon 31; Rebs: Charles Barkley 20; Asts: Mario Elie 6
Houston leads series, 3–2

The Summit, Houston, Texas
Attendance: 16,285
Referees: Joe Crawford, Bernie Fryer, Tommy Nunez Sr.

TNT

May 15
9:00 PM

Boxscore

Houston Rockets 96, Seattle SuperSonics 99
Scoring by quarter: 13–30, 24–21, 24–27, 35–21
Pts: Hakeem Olajuwon 30; Rebs: Charles Barkley 12; Asts: Clyde Drexler 6	Pts: Shawn Kemp 22; Rebs: Shawn Kemp 11; Asts: Gary Payton 13
Series tied, 3–3

KeyArena, Seattle, Washington
Attendance: 17,072
Referees: Ron Garretson, Hue Hollins, Eddie F. Rush

NBC

May 17
3:30 PM

Boxscore

Seattle SuperSonics 91, Houston Rockets 96
Scoring by quarter: 31–30, 19–25, 17–19, 24–22
Pts: Gary Payton 27; Rebs: Shawn Kemp 10; Asts: Gary Payton 7	Pts: Clyde Drexler 24; Rebs: Charles Barkley 14; Asts: Mario Elie 11
Houston wins series, 4–3

The Summit, Houston, Texas
Attendance: 16,285
Referees: Hugh Evans, Steve Javie, Bennett Salvatore

- Seattle and Houston individually tie their regular season records with 57 wins apiece. Although the Sonics won the Pacific division, the Rockets won the regular season series over the Sonics 3–1, and gained home-court advantage.

Regular-season series
Houston won 3–1 in the regular-season series

December 14, 1996

Recap

Houston Rockets 109, Seattle SuperSonics 100

KeyArena, Seattle

December 30, 1996

Recap

Seattle SuperSonics 91, Houston Rockets 99

The Summit, Houston, Texas

February 14, 1997

Recap

Houston Rockets 85, Seattle SuperSonics 105

KeyArena, Seattle

April 13, 1997

Recap

Seattle SuperSonics 73, Houston Rockets 113

The Summit, Houston, Texas

This was the sixth playoff meeting between these two teams, with the SuperSonics winning the first five meetings.

Previous playoff series
Seattle leads 5–0 in all-time playoff series

1982

Houston Rockets 1, Seattle SuperSonics 2

1982 Western Conference First Round

1987

Houston Rockets 2, Seattle SuperSonics 4

1987 Western Conference Semifinals

1989

Houston Rockets 0, Seattle SuperSonics 3

1989 Western Conference First Round

1993

Houston Rockets 3, Seattle SuperSonics 4

1993 Western Conference Semifinals

1996

Houston Rockets 0, Seattle SuperSonics 4

1996 Western Conference Semifinals

== Conference finals ==
=== Eastern Conference finals ===
==== (1) Chicago Bulls vs. (2) Miami Heat ====
TNT

May 20
8:00 PM

Boxscore

Miami Heat 77, Chicago Bulls 84
Scoring by quarter: 25–17, 24–21, 17–23, 11–23
Pts: Alonzo Mourning 21; Rebs: Mourning, Austin 8 each Asts: Tim Hardaway 9	Pts: Michael Jordan 37; Rebs: Dennis Rodman 19; Asts: Pippen, Harper 4 each
Chicago leads series, 1–0

United Center, Chicago, Illinois
Attendance: 24,544
Referees: Hugh Evans, Eddie F. Rush, Bennett Salvatore

TNT

May 22
8:00 PM

Boxscore

Miami Heat 68, Chicago Bulls 75
Scoring by quarter: 12–22, 17–17, 16–12, 23–24
Pts: Tim Hardaway 15; Rebs: Alonzo Mourning 8 Asts: Tim Hardaway 5	Pts: Jordan, Pippen 23 each Rebs: Dennis Rodman 10; Asts: Ron Harper 6
Chicago leads series, 2–0

United Center, Chicago, Illinois
Attendance: 24,544
Referees: Bernie Fryer, Steve Javie, Bill Oakes

NBC

May 24
3:30 PM

Boxscore

Chicago Bulls 98, Miami Heat 74
Scoring by quarter: 19–15, 28–19, 25–15, 26–25
Pts: Michael Jordan 34; Rebs: Dennis Rodman 9 Asts: Toni Kukoč 6	Pts: Voshon Lenard 14; Rebs: Alonzo Mourning 9 Asts: John Crotty 5
Chicago leads series, 3–0

Miami Arena, Miami, Florida
Attendance: 14,720
Referees: Dick Bavetta, Ron Garretson, Jack Nies

NBC

May 26
3:30 PM

Boxscore

Chicago Bulls 80, Miami Heat 87
Scoring by quarter: 19–24, 12–23, 26–14, 23–26
Pts: Michael Jordan 29; Rebs: Dennis Rodman 11; Asts: Scottie Pippen 5	Pts: Tim Hardaway 25; Rebs: Alonzo Mourning 14; Asts: Tim Hardaway 7
Chicago leads series, 3–1

Miami Arena, Miami, Florida
Attendance: 14,720
Referees: Bob Delaney, Joe Forte, Ed T. Rush

NBC

May 28
9:00 PM

Boxscore

Miami Heat 87, Chicago Bulls 100
Scoring by quarter: 19–33, 31–31, 15–16, 22–20
Pts: Tim Hardaway 27; Rebs: Alonzo Mourning 8 Asts: Lenard, Hardaway 5 each	Pts: Michael Jordan 28; Rebs: Dennis Rodman 13; Asts: Toni Kukoč 7
Chicago wins series, 4–1

United Center, Chicago, Illinois
Attendance: 24,544
Referees: Joe Crawford, Hue Hollins, Don Vaden

Regular-season series
Tied 2–2 in the regular-season series

November 6, 1996

Recap

Chicago Bulls 106, Miami Heat 100

Miami Arena, Miami

November 13, 1996

Recap

Miami Heat 71, Chicago Bulls 103

United Center, Chicago, Illinois

December 7, 1996

Recap

Miami Heat 83, Chicago Bulls 80

United Center, Chicago, Illinois

April 16, 1997

Recap

Chicago Bulls 92, Miami Heat 102

Miami Arena, Miami

This was the third playoff meeting between these two teams, with the Bulls winning the first two meetings.

Previous playoff series
Chicago leads 2–0 in all-time playoff series

1992

Chicago Bulls 3, Miami Heat 0

1992 Eastern Conference First Round

1996

Chicago Bulls 3, Miami Heat 0

1996 Eastern Conference First Round

=== Western Conference finals ===
==== (1) Utah Jazz vs. (3) Houston Rockets ====
TNT

May 19
8:00 PM

Boxscore

Houston Rockets 86, Utah Jazz 101
Scoring by quarter: 23–20, 17–29, 25–30, 21–22
Pts: Hakeem Olajuwon 30; Rebs: Hakeem Olajuwon 13; Asts: Hakeem Olajuwon 5	Pts: Karl Malone 21; Rebs: Karl Malone 13; Asts: John Stockton 13
Utah leads series, 1–0

Delta Center, Salt Lake City, Utah
Attendance: 19,911
Referees: Dick Bavetta, Bob Delaney, Joe Forte

TNT

May 21
8:00 PM

Boxscore

Houston Rockets 92, Utah Jazz 104
Scoring by quarter: 23–25, 19–23, 26–35, 24–21
Pts: Hakeem Olajuwon 30; Rebs: Charles Barkley 12; Asts: Clyde Drexler 4	Pts: John Stockton 26; Rebs: Karl Malone 15; Asts: John Stockton 12
Utah leads series, 2–0

Delta Center, Salt Lake City, Utah
Attendance: 19,911
Referees: Jim Clark, Jack Nies, Ed T. Rush

TNT

May 23
8:00 PM

Boxscore

Utah Jazz 100, Houston Rockets 118
Scoring by quarter: 31–18, 20–33, 21–29, 28–38
Pts: Karl Malone 21; Rebs: Greg Ostertag 9 Asts: John Stockton 10	Pts: Eddie Johnson 31; Rebs: Charles Barkley 16; Asts: three players 6 each
Utah leads series, 2–1

The Summit, Houston, Texas
Attendance: 16,285
Referees: Joe Crawford, Hue Hollins, Don Vaden

NBC

May 25
3:30 PM

Boxscore

Utah Jazz 92, Houston Rockets 95
Scoring by quarter: 27–24, 26–24, 23–27, 16–20
Pts: Malone, Stockton 22 each Rebs: Karl Malone 10; Asts: John Stockton 8	Pts: Hakeem Olajuwon 27; Rebs: Charles Barkley 16; Asts: Matt Maloney 6
Series tied, 2–2

The Summit, Houston, Texas
Attendance: 16,285
Referees: Dan Crawford, Bernie Fryer, Bill Oakes

Eddie Johnson hits the game-winning 3-pointer to even the series.

NBC

May 27
9:00 PM

Boxscore

Houston Rockets 91, Utah Jazz 96
Scoring by quarter: 27–24, 17–23, 20–24, 27–25
Pts: Hakeem Olajuwon 33; Rebs: Hakeem Olajuwon 10; Asts: Charles Barkley 5	Pts: Karl Malone 29; Rebs: Karl Malone 14; Asts: John Stockton 6
Utah leads series, 3–2

Delta Center, Salt Lake City, Utah
Attendance: 19,911
Referees: Hugh Evans, Ron Garretson, Bennett Salvatore

NBC

May 29
9:00 PM

Boxscore

Utah Jazz 103, Houston Rockets 100
Scoring by quarter: 23–21, 20–28, 27–22, 33–29
Pts: John Stockton 25; Rebs: Greg Ostertag 14; Asts: John Stockton 13	Pts: Clyde Drexler 33; Rebs: Hakeem Olajuwon 11; Asts: Sedale Threatt 9
Utah wins series, 4–2

The Summit, Houston, Texas
Attendance: 16,285
Referees: Dick Bavetta, Steve Javie, Eddie F. Rush

John Stockton hits the series-winning 3-pointer.

Regular-season series
Tied 2–2 in the regular-season series

November 4, 1996

Recap

Houston Rockets 75, Utah Jazz 72

Delta Center, Salt Lake City

November 9, 1996

Recap

Utah Jazz 85, Houston Rockets 91

The Summit, Houston, Texas

January 25, 1997

Recap

Utah Jazz 105, Houston Rockets 100

The Summit, Houston, Texas

April 11, 1997

Recap

Houston Rockets 83, Utah Jazz 104

Delta Center, Salt Lake City

This was the fourth playoff meeting between these two teams, with the Rockets winning two of the first three meetings.

Previous playoff series
Houston leads 2–1 in all-time playoff series

1985

Houston Rockets 2, Utah Jazz 3

1985 Western Conference First Round

1994

Houston Rockets 4, Utah Jazz 1

1994 Western Conference Finals

1995

Houston Rockets 3, Utah Jazz 2

1995 Western Conference First Round

== NBA Finals: (E1) Chicago Bulls vs. (W1) Utah Jazz ==
NBC

June 1
7:00 PM

Boxscore

Utah Jazz 82, Chicago Bulls 84
Scoring by quarter: 18–17, 24–21, 22–24, 18–22
Pts: Karl Malone 23; Rebs: Karl Malone 15; Asts: John Stockton 12	Pts: Michael Jordan 31; Rebs: Dennis Rodman 12; Asts: Michael Jordan 8
Chicago leads series, 1–0

United Center, Chicago, Illinois
Attendance: 24,544
Referees: Dan Crawford, Bill Oakes, Ed T. Rush

Michael Jordan hit the game-winning shot at the buzzer.

NBC

June 4
9:00 PM

Boxscore

Utah Jazz 85, Chicago Bulls 97
Scoring by quarter: 20–25, 11–22, 28–31, 26–19
Pts: Karl Malone 20; Rebs: Karl Malone 13; Asts: John Stockton 7	Pts: Michael Jordan 38; Rebs: Michael Jordan 13; Asts: Michael Jordan 9
Chicago leads series, 2–0

United Center, Chicago, Illinois
Attendance: 24,544
Referees: Hugh Evans, Steve Javie, Bennett Salvatore

NBC

June 6
9:00 PM

Boxscore

Chicago Bulls 93, Utah Jazz 104
Scoring by quarter: 22–31, 23–30, 15–16, 33–27
Pts: Scottie Pippen 27; Rebs: Ron Harper 7 Asts: Michael Jordan 6	Pts: Karl Malone 37; Rebs: Karl Malone 10; Asts: John Stockton 12
Chicago leads series, 2–1

Delta Center, Salt Lake City, Utah
Attendance: 19,911
Referees: Joe Crawford, Hue Hollins, Jack Nies

Scottie Pippen tied a then-Finals record with 7 3-pointers.

NBC

June 8
7:00 PM

Boxscore

Chicago Bulls 73, Utah Jazz 78
Scoring by quarter: 16–21, 24–14, 16–21, 17–22
Pts: Michael Jordan 22; Rebs: Scottie Pippen 12; Asts: Michael Jordan 6	Pts: Karl Malone 23; Rebs: Karl Malone 10; Asts: John Stockton 12
Series tied, 2–2

Delta Center, Salt Lake City, Utah
Attendance: 19,911
Referees: Dick Bavetta, Joe Forte, Ed T. Rush

John Stockton threw a full-court pass over Michael Jordan to Karl Malone to give Utah the lead for good.

NBC

June 11
9:00 PM

Boxscore

Chicago Bulls 90, Utah Jazz 88
Scoring by quarter: 16–29, 33–24, 18–19, 23–16
Pts: Michael Jordan 38; Rebs: Scottie Pippen 10; Asts: Pippen, Jordan 5 each	Pts: Karl Malone 19; Rebs: Greg Ostertag 15; Asts: Karl Malone 6
Chicago leads series, 3–2

Delta Center, Salt Lake City, Utah
Attendance: 19,911
Referees: Dan Crawford, Hugh Evans, Bill Oakes

(The Flu Game), Michael Jordan plays 44 minutes and scores 38 points despite being ill from food poisoning.

NBC

June 13
9:00 PM

Boxscore

Utah Jazz 86, Chicago Bulls 90
Scoring by quarter: 23–17, 21–20, 26–27, 16–26
Pts: Karl Malone 21; Rebs: Greg Ostertag 8 Asts: John Stockton 5	Pts: Michael Jordan 39; Rebs: Jordan, Rodman 11 each Asts: Michael Jordan 4
Chicago wins series, 4–2

United Center, Chicago, Illinois
Attendance: 24,544
Referees: Joe Crawford, Steve Javie, Bennett Salvatore

Steve Kerr hits the series-winner with 5 seconds left, then Scottie Pippen steals Bryon Russell's inbounds pass and rolls the ball to Toni Kukoč, who dunks it right before the buzzer to bring the Finals to a close.

Regular-season series
Tied 1–1 in the regular-season series

November 23, 1996

Recap

Chicago Bulls 100, Utah Jazz 105

Delta Center, Salt Lake City

January 6, 1997

Recap

Utah Jazz 89, Chicago Bulls 102

United Center, Chicago, Illinois

This was the first NBA Finals meeting between the Bulls and the Jazz.

== Statistical leaders ==
Category	Game high			Average			
Category	Player	Team	High	Player	Team	Avg.	GP
Points	Michael Jordan	Chicago Bulls	55	Michael Jordan	Chicago Bulls	31.1	19
Rebounds	Dikembe Mutombo	Atlanta Hawks	21	Shawn Kemp	Seattle SuperSonics	12.3	12
Assists	John Stockton	Utah Jazz	17	Jason Kidd	Phoenix Suns	9.8	5
Steals	Hersey Hawkins	Seattle SuperSonics	6	Kevin Johnson	Phoenix Suns	2.6	5
Blocks	Greg Ostertag	Utah Jazz	9	Alonzo Mourning	Miami Heat	2.7	17
