= TNA Impact!'s move to Monday nights =

Era in professional wrestling

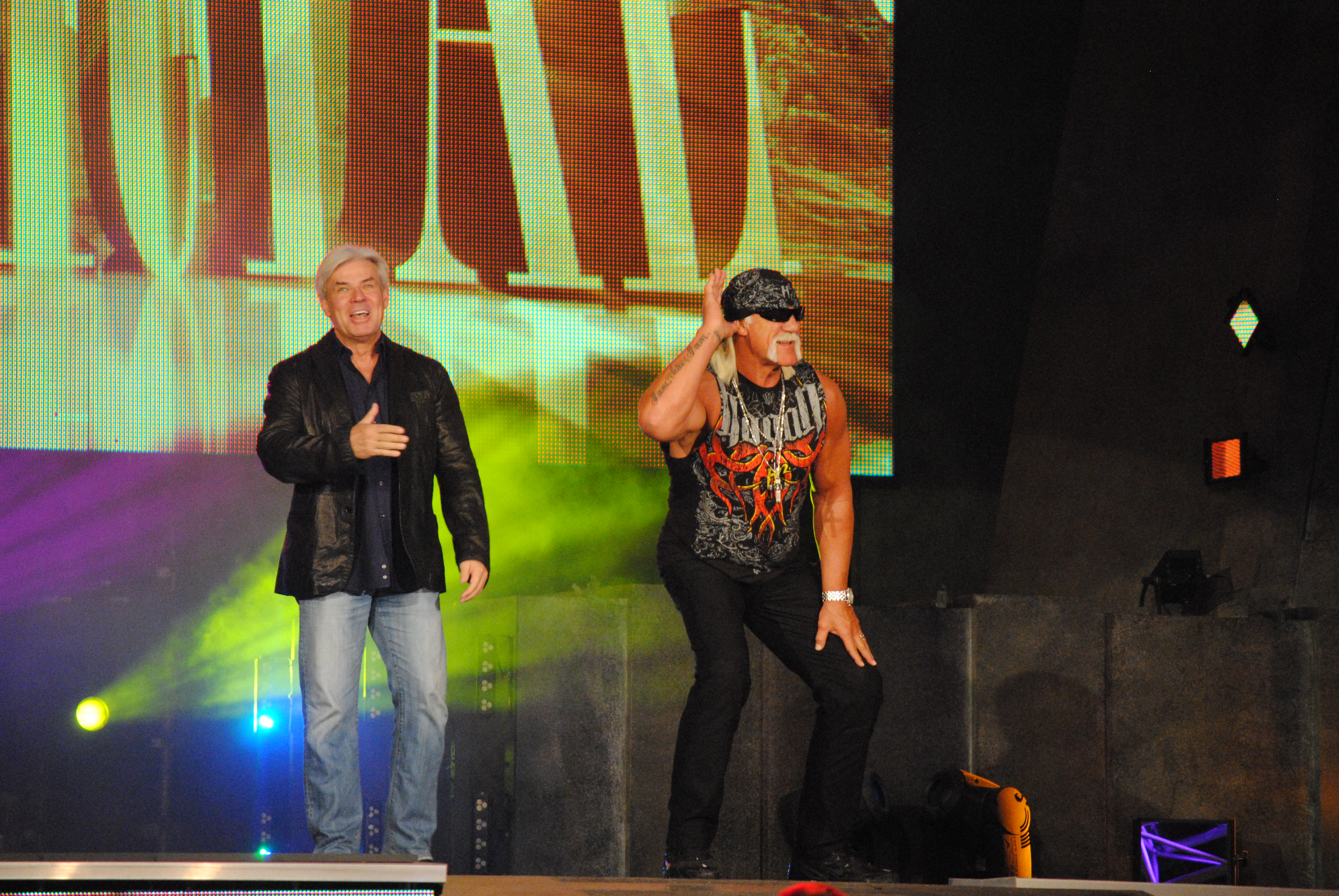
TNA Impact!'s move to Monday nights came after Eric Bischoff and Hulk Hogan signed with the promotion

In March 2010, professional wrestling promotion Total Nonstop Action Wrestling (TNA) moved their weekly television program, Impact!, from airing on Thursdays to airing Monday nights. In doing so, TNA placed Impact! in direct competition with World Wrestling Entertainment's (WWE) flagship program Monday Night Raw. It drew comparisons to the Monday Night War, in which defunct wrestling promotion World Championship Wrestling (WCW) program Nitro went head-to-head with Raw in a battle for higher Nielsen ratings each week from 1995 to 2001; this led Impact!'s move to sometimes be called "The New Monday Night Wars". The move was spurred by the signing of Hulk Hogan and Eric Bischoff, two central figures of the original Monday Night War. Unlike WCW, TNA never gained traction against WWE, despite initially setting record high ratings for Impact!. Impact! returned to its Thursday night timeslot after declining ratings in May, less than two months after the move.

Chart of Impact! and Raw ratings
| Date | Raw | Impact! |
|---|---|---|
| January 4, 2010 | 3.6 | 1.5 |
| March 8, 2010 | 3.4 | 0.98 |
| March 15, 2010 | 3.71 | 0.84 |
| March 22, 2010 | 3.2 | 0.86 |
| March 29, 2010 | 3.7 | 0.62 |
| April 5, 2010 | 3.15 | 0.9 |
| April 12, 2010 | 3.24 | 0.8 |
| April 19, 2010 | 3.05 | 0.95 |
| April 26, 2010 | 3.3 | 0.5 |
| May 3, 2010 | 3.05 | 0.8 |

== Background and first Monday Impact! ==
On October 27, 2009, Hulk Hogan announced that he and Eric Bischoff had signed with Total Nonstop Action Wrestling (TNA) in a press conference held at The Theater at Madison Square Garden. TNA President Dixie Carter stated "Our goal is to become the world's biggest professional wrestling company. Hulk defines professional wrestling and we look forward to partnering with him in a variety of ways as we continue to grow TNA globally."

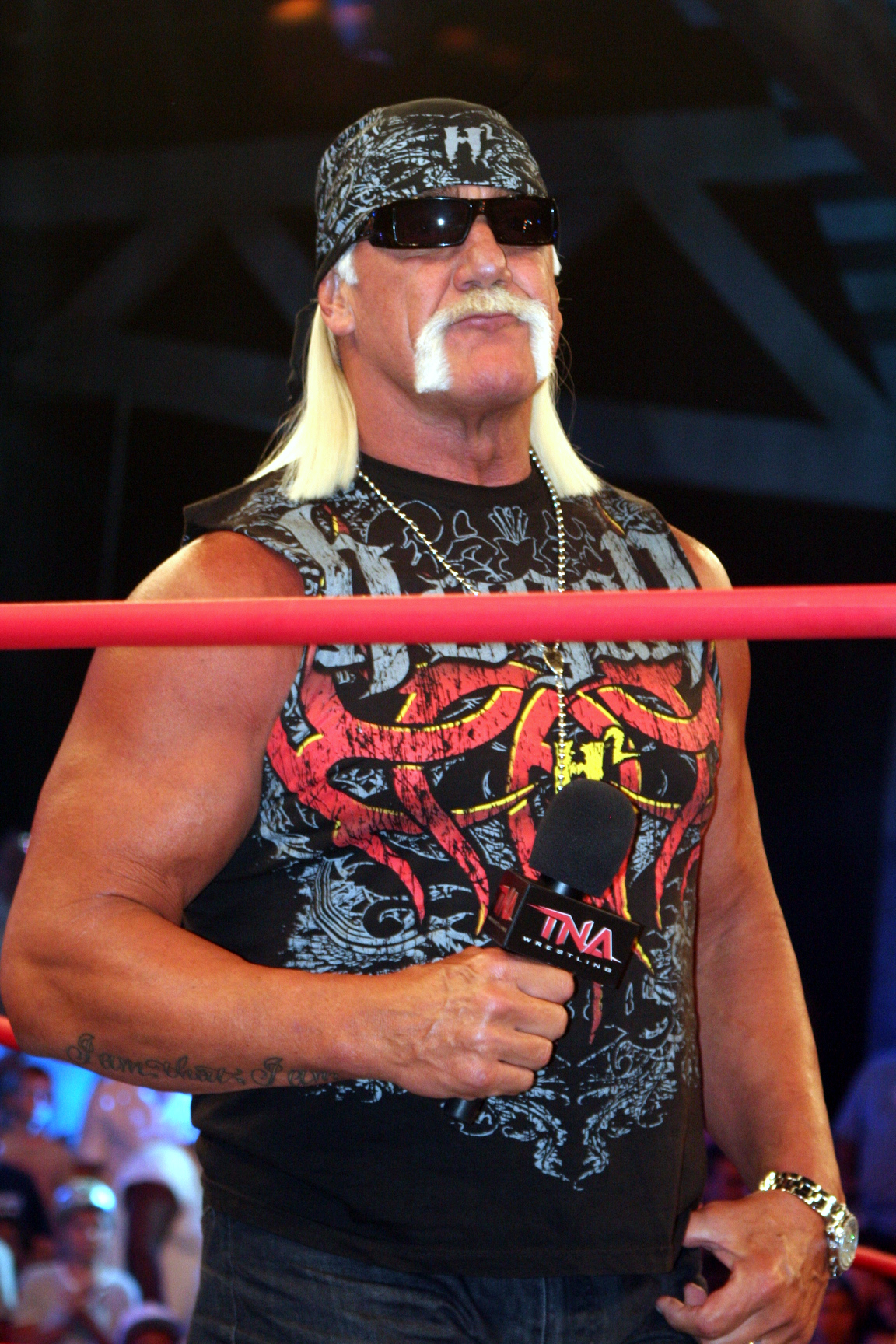
Hulk Hogan joined TNA in late 2009

During an appearance on Spike's presentation of The Ultimate Fighter: Heavyweights Finale on December 5, Hogan announced that Impact!, which normally aired on Thursdays, would go head to head with World Wrestling Entertainment's (WWE) Raw on Monday January 4 in a three-hour live broadcast on Spike. Hogan was a top talent in World Championship Wrestling (WCW), which Bischoff was an executive of, when WCW debuted a program in 1995, Nitro, to compete with Raw in a ratings battle called the Monday Night War.

WWE countered by announcing the return of Bret Hart, who had not appeared in WWE since the Montreal Screwjob in 1997. Leading up to the show, Carter stated that while Spike was not expecting Impact! to beat Raw in the ratings, it would be considered a success if they managed to at least maintain their usual Thursday night Impact! rating. Spike president Kevin Kay also announced there were plans to air Impact! on Mondays quarterly through 2010 and added that if the ratings proved successful on January 4, it could be moved to Monday nights permanently.

By signing with TNA, Bischoff and Hogan were paired with writer Vince Russo, whom they had conflicted with in WCW and had not worked with since they departed WCW after Bash at the Beach 2000. According to Russo, the three met together and worked out their differences before the January 4 show.

The Monday night Impact! featured the returns of Scott Hall, Sean Waltman, Sting, Jeff Jarrett, Jeff Hardy, and the debuts of Ric Flair, Sean Morley, The Nasty Boys, Orlando Jordan and Bubba the Love Sponge in addition to Hogan and Bischoff. On Raw, Bret Hart confronted Vince McMahon and Shawn Michaels for the first time in thirteen years.

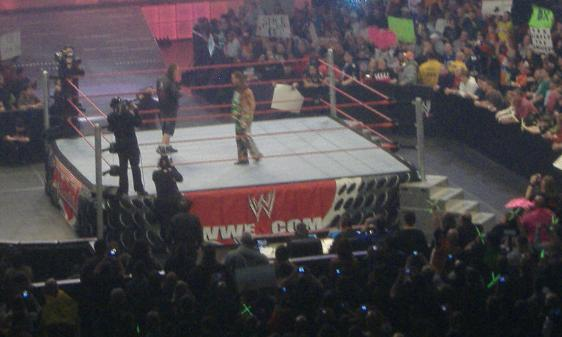
Bret Hart confronts Shawn Michaels on January 4, 2010

The ratings showed that Raw came out on top, averaging 5.6 million viewers while Impact! averaged 2.2 million viewers. The show peaked with three million viewers for the Hulk Hogan segment but then the viewership declined towards the end of the show to near 2.2 million viewers, the replay on January 7, 2010, garnered a 0.9 rating thus giving TNA a combined viewership range of 3.5–4.5 million viewers. However, despite not beating Raw in the ratings, TNA managed to set a new record for Impact!, beating the previous one of 1.97 million viewers, and thus gaining the confidence of Spike representatives.

== Move to Mondays ==
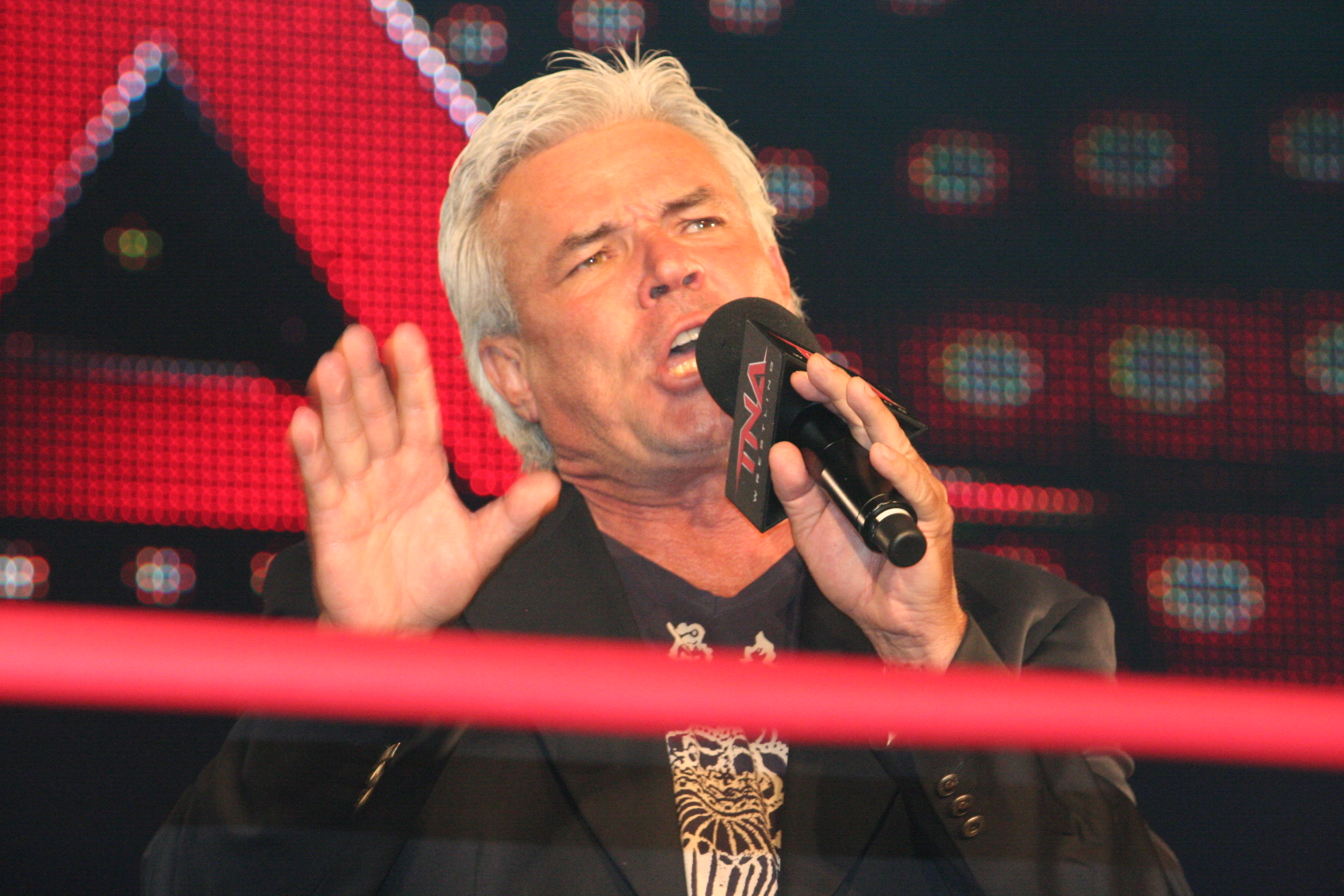
Bischoff at a TNA event in July 2010

On March 8, 2010, Impact! moved to Monday nights at 9 pm EST to compete head-to-head with Raw. Eric Bischoff was once again competing on the opposite side of Vince McMahon's WWE and in an interview with Bubba the Love Sponge, he said that he believed "history is repeating itself". This new "war" began in much the same way as the original did; with TNA relying on established wrestlers, including former WWE talent, and with TNA being led by Hulk Hogan and Eric Bischoff. WWE spokesman Robert Zimmerman responded to TNA's move by saying "We're not too concerned. We're in good shape." Bischoff and Russo each stated that TNA were not focused on beating WWE in the ratings straight away, but rather gaining a significant share of their audience and growing TNA's own audience.

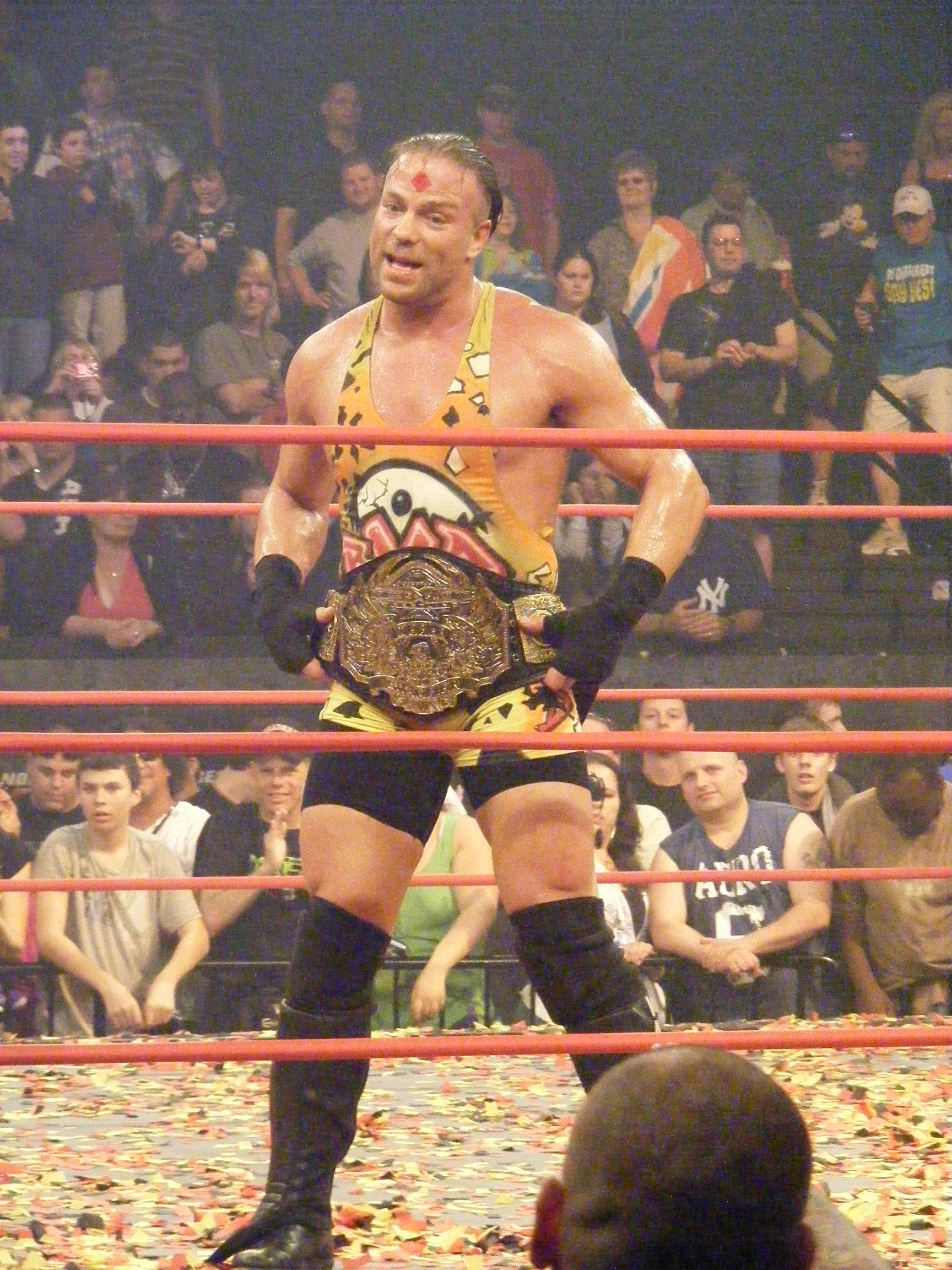
Rob Van Dam won the TNA World Heavyweight Championship on the highest rated episode in April

On the March 8, 2010, Raw beat Impact! with a 3.4 rating which equated to approximately 5.1 million viewers, while Impact! did a 0.98 with 1.4 million viewers; the replay of the show on Thursdays did 1.0, getting TNA a combined audience of 2.7 million viewers. The following week, the March 15 episode of Impact! scored its lowest rating since November 2006 with a .84 rating. No quarter-hour segment of Impact! reached past the previous week's overall rating. The broadcast lost 15% of the audience it opened with, going from a .87 opening quarter-hour to a .72 in the A.J. Styles versus Jeff Hardy main event. Impact! averaged 1.1 million viewers, an overall decrease of 21.4% in viewership from the previous week. Raw scored a 3.71 rating and averaged 5.60 million viewers, an overall increase of 10% in viewership from the previous week. The broadcast's first hour was the most viewed first hour since August 24, 2009, while the second was the most viewed second hour since January 4, 2010. On March 22, six days before WrestleMania XXVI, Raw scored a 3.2 and Impact! scored a 0.86. Raw's rating was down more than one million viewers, equating to about 20%. Ratings for Impact! had improved slightly over the last week as they promoted a Career vs. Career match between Jeff Jarrett and Mick Foley.

The night after WrestleMania XXVI, Raw scored a 3.7 rating, up from last week, and Impact! scored a 0.62. Spike executives announced the April 5 live Impact! would air an hour earlier than Raw due to competition from the NCAA Division I men's basketball tournament. The April 5 episode of Raw lost 14% of their viewers with a 3.15 rating, while Impact! scored a 0.9 rating, their highest rating since the March 15 episode, gaining a 33% in total viewers as they aired Kurt Angle vs. Mr. Anderson in a ladder match. After better ratings for the April 5 episode of Impact!, TNA decided to start Impact! at the 8:00 p.m. ET time slot permanently. The April 12 episode of Raw made a comeback with a 3.24 rating, while the taped Impact! scored a 0.8 rating managing to keep most of their audience. Then on April 19, the night after TNA Lockdown, Raw scored a 3.05 rating, their lowest score in two years, while Impact! scored a 0.95 rating, their highest score since April 5 as they featured a TNA World Heavyweight Championship match between Rob Van Dam and A.J. Styles. On April 26, Raw aired the 2010 WWE draft, and scored a 3.3 rating, while Impact! lost 48% of their audience with a 0.5 rating.

== Return to Thursdays ==
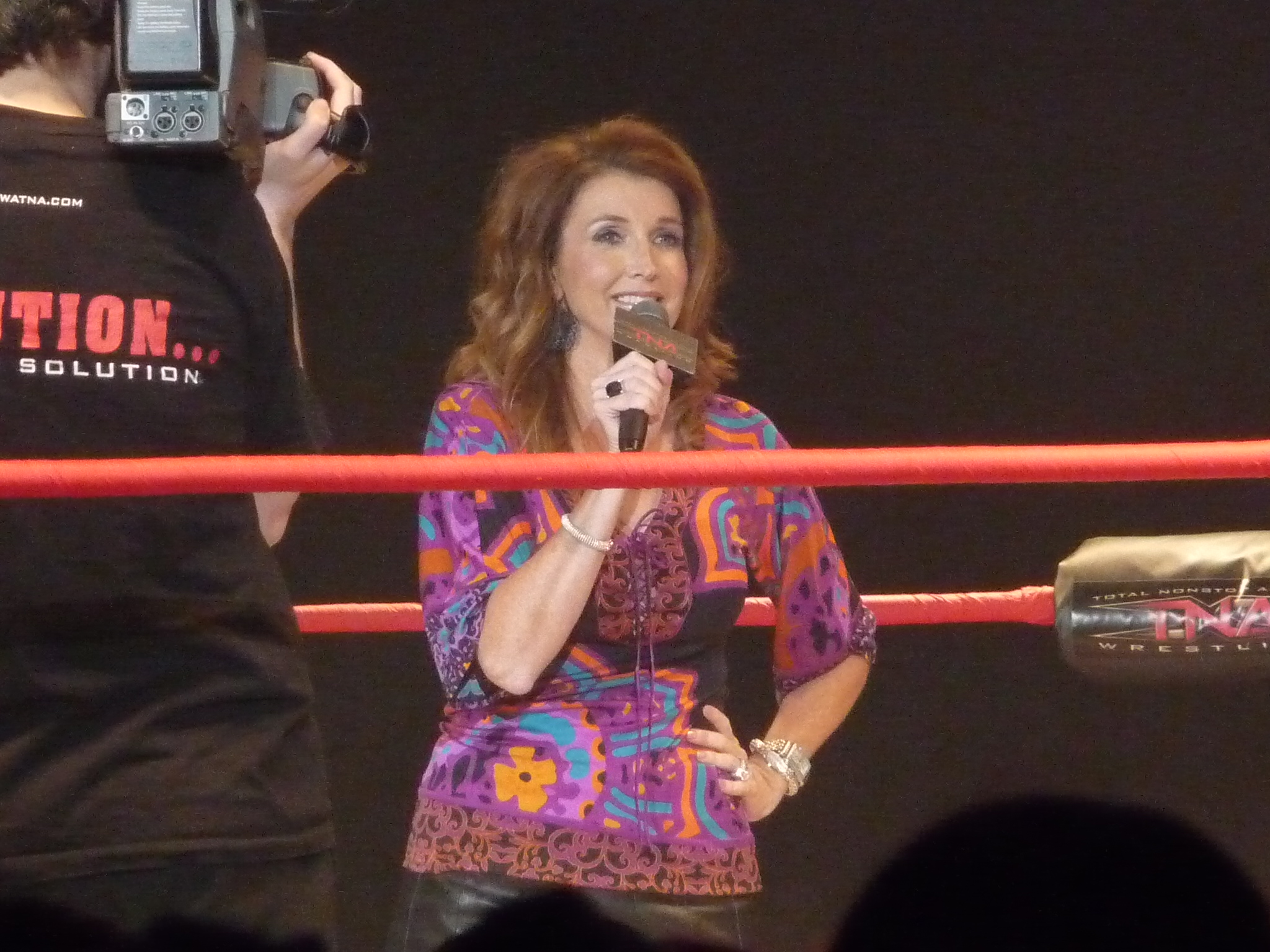
TNA President Dixie Carter in 2010

Impact! moved back to Thursday nights starting with the May 13 show. On the final battle between Raw and Impact!, Raw drew a 3.05 and Impact! drew a 0.8 rating gaining a 37.5% in total viewers. The replay ratings of most of Monday night episodes were sufficient for survival but showed that the average audience is some two million viewers that prefer to watch on Thursdays.

In a press release, Spike's Senior Vice President of Sports and Specials, Brian J. Diamond, said: "The fans have spoken and with their input we have determined the best time slot to maximize the TNA audience is on Thursday nights where we are confident it will be among the most-watched shows with young men". In the same announcement, Dixie Carter was quoted as saying, "Our fans made it clear that they preferred the Thursday night time period. By moving to Thursdays, this is a win/win opportunity for both TNA and the fans. We are looking forward to delivering what the fans are asking for."

== Reception and legacy ==
Vice described the move as one of many gambles TNA has taken during their history, but wrote that it "turned out disastrously." Impact! ratings dropped 7% from 2009's 1.14 average, finishing 2010 at 1.06. WrestleView ascribed the drop to the "disastrous decision" to run opposite Raw. Although the move failed to boost ratings for TNA, James Caldwell of Pro Wrestling Torch attributed a 6% drop in Raw ratings (from 3.69 to 3.47) to competition from Impact!. The move was voted the winner of WrestleCrap's "Gooker Award" for the worst gimmick, storyline, match, or event in wrestling that year.

By July 2011, nearly all of the new talents brought in for Impact!'s initial Monday launch had left TNA, with the exceptions of Ric Flair (who left the following year) and Jeff Hardy (who left in 2017). Hulk Hogan departed TNA in October 2013. Eric Bischoff was sent home from TNA that same month and his contract expired in early 2014. When asked about positive memories from his time in TNA, Bischoff stated, "I don’t have any."

In the tenth anniversary reprint of R.D. Reynolds and Bryan Alvarez's The Death of WCW, the authors compared the move to the original Monday Night War. They wrote that TNA did not have the audience that WCW did when they moved to initiate the Monday Night War, pointing out that WCW Saturday Night typically did better than WWE shows did in the weekend timeslots. Reynolds and Alvarez also wrote that TNA did not have the financial resources that WCW did and that WWE was not "asleep at the wheel" as they were in 1995.

WWE would not face direct ratings competition from a rival promotion again until the beginning of the "Wednesday Night War" on October 2, 2019, when All Elite Wrestling (AEW) debuted their weekly show, Dynamite, during the same timeslot as WWE NXT. Comicbook.com wrote that TNA's move to Monday night's "[serves] as somewhat of a cautionary tale to any companies bold enough to try and take on Vince McMahon." AEW executive Nick Jackson of The Young Bucks said that TNA failed to be different from WWE, telling Bleacher Report that: "You can't try to be them. The one thing TNA did wrong was try to be a lesser version of them. We can't be them because we're not competing with them. We have to be different and we have to listen to the fans."

Impact!'s move to Monday nights was covered by Dark Side of the Ring in July 2026, during part three of its "Jeff Jarrett & the Battle for TNA" series. Jarrett blamed Hogan for the decision and identified the move as one of the key factors that sent the promotion into a "financial death spiral". Russo and TNA producer D'Lo Brown also criticized it, explaining that TNA did not have the financial resources to compete head-to-head with WWE.
