= Wednesday Night Wars =

Era of professional wrestling

The Wednesday Night War or Wednesday Night Wars refers to a period of mainstream televised American professional wrestling in which All Elite Wrestling (AEW)'s Dynamite debuted on TNT opposite WWE's NXT on USA Network in a competition for Nielsen ratings each week. The ratings war lasted from October 2, 2019, to April 7, 2021.

This was the first direct competition between two major promotions since Total Nonstop Action Wrestling (TNA, later Impact Wrestling), briefly moved their flagship series, Impact!, to Monday nights opposite WWE Raw in 2010, and over 20 years following the original Monday Night War that lasted from 1995 to 2001.

AEW won the ratings battle almost every week in both total viewership and in the viewership from the key 18–49 age demographic, and on April 13, 2021, NXT moved to Tuesday nights, ending the Wednesday Night Wars.

== History ==
=== Origins ===
==== 2000s–2010s: Post-Monday Night War ====
After the "Monday Night War", with the bankruptcy and subsequent acquisitions of both World Championship Wrestling (WCW) and Extreme Championship Wrestling (ECW), WWE became the dominant professional wrestling company in the United States. In 2008, WWE began to take a family-oriented approach, in which all of its programming received a rating of TV-PG.

In 2010, Total Nonstop Action Wrestling (TNA), which targets an adult audience, moved their flagship, weekly series, Impact!, to Monday nights on Spike TV opposite Raw from January to May 2010. Impact! suffered from low ratings and ultimately returned to their regular Thursday night timeslot on May 13, 2010.

The move itself was panned by critics and viewers. In the tenth anniversary reprint of R.D. Reynolds and Bryan Alvarez's Death of WCW, the authors compared the move to the original Monday Night War, writing that TNA did not have the audience that WCW did, pointing out that WCW Saturday Night typically did better than WWE shows did in the weekend timeslots. Reynolds and Alvarez also wrote that TNA did not have the financial resources that WCW did.

==== 2012: NXT's revamp ====
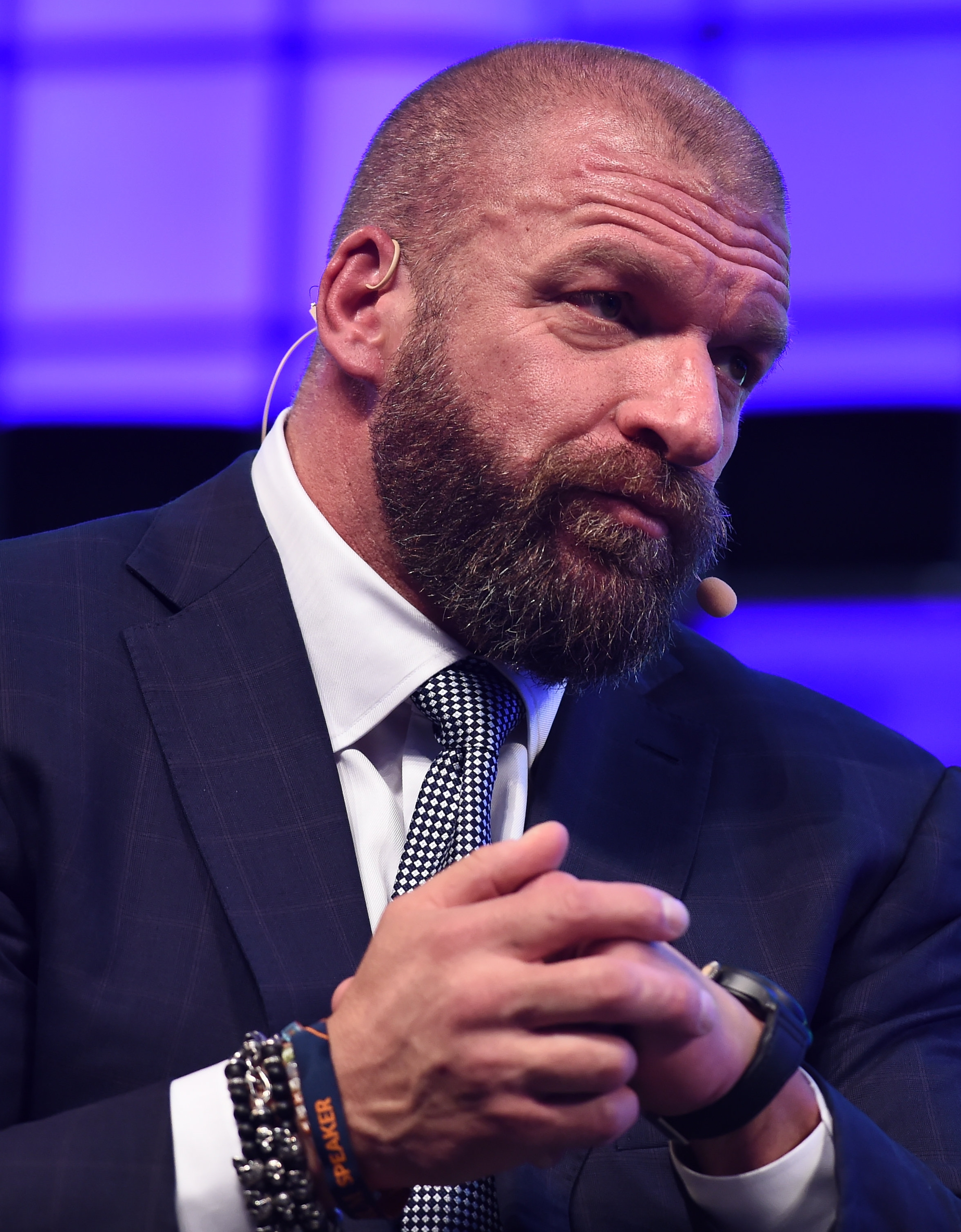
From 2012 to late 2021, Triple H was in charge of NXT.

In 2012, WWE NXT was revamped to focus exclusively on its developmental talent, with Florida Championship Wrestling (FCW) (WWE's former developmental territory) being relaunched under the NXT brand. NXT became a webcast on WWE's official website, before later airing on Hulu and the WWE Network. During this period Triple H took charge of NXT.

In the years since the revamp, NXT garnered critical acclaim for its more grounded storylines and sports-based presentation compared to WWE's "main roster" programming, with fans and pundits eventually viewing the brand as its own distinct entity and its TakeOver specials to be superior in quality to WWE's monthly pay-per-views.

==== 2018–2019: The formation of All Elite Wrestling ====
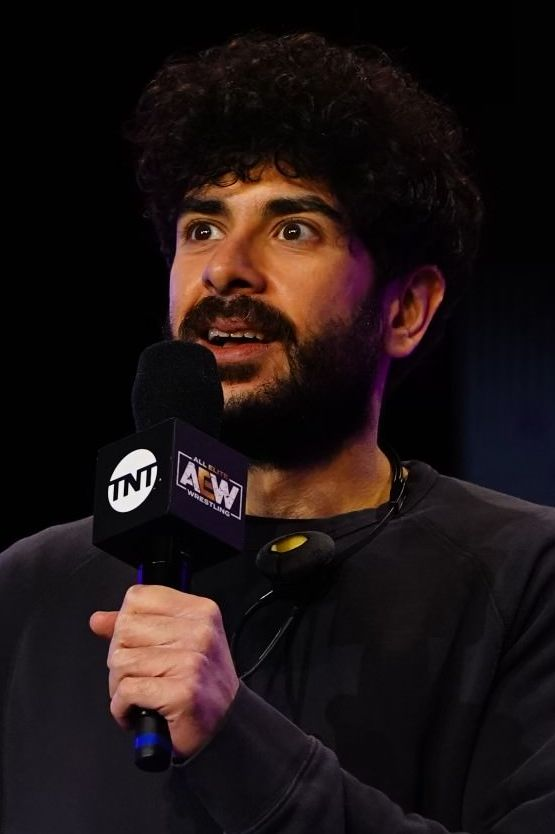
AEW co-owner/President/CEO Tony Khan

On January 10, 2018, Cody Rhodes and The Young Bucks, members of the stable known as The Elite, announced an independent event called All In, which was scheduled for September 1 of that year at the Sears Centre Arena in Hoffman Estates, Illinois. Tickets for the event went on sale on May 13, and sold out in less than 30 minutes. The event was attended by 11,263 people, making it the first event in North America not held by WWE or WCW to sell 10,000 tickets or more since 1993. Four months after All In, Cody, The Young Bucks, and “Hangman” Adam Page left New Japan Pro-Wrestling (NJPW) and Ring of Honor (ROH) and announced plans to start a new wrestling promotion. The promotion, which became known as All Elite Wrestling (AEW), began operations on January 1, 2019, and announced that its first event, Double or Nothing, would be held on May 25 of that year.

Ten days before Double or Nothing was held, AEW reached a deal with WarnerMedia to broadcast a weekly show on TNT, which would later become known as Dynamite. On July 24, 2019, AEW announced that Dynamite premiered on Wednesday, October 2 and was broadcast live every week. The premiere of Dynamite marked the return of professional wrestling to a Warner-owned network after TNT broadcast the final episode of WCW Monday Nitro on March 26, 2001. AEW has been described as "the first major promotion to compete financially with WWE since the closure of WCW".

==== 2019: NXT's move to USA Network ====
In August 2019, it was announced that NXT would be moving to USA Network, marking the show's first broadcast on USA Network since December 20, 2017, and expanding the program to a live, two-hour format. Critics felt that the move was an attempt to counterprogram Dynamite, which would premiere two weeks later. NXT premiered on USA Network on September 18, 2019. However, due to scheduling overlap with the final episodes of original series Suits, only the first hour of NXT was broadcast on USA Network for its first two weeks while the second hour was shown on WWE Network. In its first two weeks, NXT drew 1.179 and 1.006 million viewers respectively.

=== Wednesday Night Wars ===
==== 2019: The debut of Dynamite ====
On October 2, 2019, Dynamite debuted on TNT, which averaged 1.409 million viewers and approximately 878,000 viewers in 18-49. This number was touted by TNT as the most successful premiere show in over 5 years for TNT. According to Dave Meltzer of the Wrestling Observer Newsletter, the first 15 minutes of Dynamite was watched by a whopping 1.625 million viewers and 1.015 million in 18-49. NXT made their full two-hour debut on USA Network on the same night, which averaged 891,000 viewers and 415,000 in 18-49. Dynamite beat NXT in the ratings among both viewers in the 18–49 range and total viewers for its first seven episodes. NXT began to gain ground when WWE announced that the brand's wrestlers would compete at that year's Survivor Series, officially endorsing NXT as WWE's "third brand". Competitors from the NXT brand went on to win three of the five triple-threat matches at the pay-per-view, which saw NXT Women's Champion Shayna Baszler defeat Raw Women's Champion Becky Lynch and SmackDown Women's Champion Bayley in the main event. These developments helped NXT to place first in the ratings for three out of the six remaining weeks of 2019, which culminated in a match where Rhea Ripley defeated Shayna Baszler to win the women's championship on the December 18 episode. NXT ran unopposed on December 25, the final Wednesday of 2019, as Dynamite did not air due to Christmas Day.

==== 2020: Impact of the COVID-19 pandemic ====
Both NXT and Dynamite began broadcasting empty arena shows in March 2020 as a result of the COVID-19 pandemic. Both shows stopped touring and started broadcasting from fixed venues. NXT was broadcast initially from Full Sail University and later, from October 2020, the WWE Performance Center. Dynamite was initially held at Daily's Place, an amphitheater adjacent to TIAA Bank Field. AEW later taped shows at the Nightmare Factory training facility in Norcross, Georgia, in late March and early April, taping up to six weeks of episodes preparing for that year's Double or Nothing pay-per-view. As live sports were allowed to resume in the Jacksonville area by early May, AEW returned to Daily's Place, which became AEW's home base for over a year. For the 18 months head to head Dynamite would be beat NXT in mostly every Demographic except people over the age of 50 which NXT had a wider margin over Dynamite and helped score a handful of wins in Total Viewers. During the latter half of 2020 NXT’s P18-49 (Which Networks and Advertisers prioritise) began to weaken while Dynamite’s was only increasing. Which led to beginning talks about NXT possibly moving to a different night.

==== 2021: NXT moves to Tuesday and end of the Wednesday Night Wars ====
On March 30, 2021, it was reported that NXT would move to Tuesday nights on April 13, 2021. In January, USA Network's parent company, NBCUniversal, announced it would shut down NBCSN by the end of the year, with certain sport programming rights moving to USA and streaming service Peacock. WWE confirmed the move to Tuesdays as part of a multi-year renewal agreement. The move to Tuesday nights brought an end to the Wednesday Night Wars.

Following the end of the Wednesday Night Wars, both programs benefitted in the Nielsen ratings without the direct competition. NXT's April 13 episode averaged 805,000 viewers with a 0.22 rating in the 18-49 demographic. This viewership number was an increase from the 768,000 viewers who tuned into night one of the NXT special NXT TakeOver: Stand & Deliver the previous Wednesday. The next day, Dynamite drew over 1.219 million viewers to TNT, up 77% from the prior week’s 688,000 almost doubling Total Viewers. This was Dynamite's best viewership number since its debut episode on October 2, 2019. AEW also placed 2nd that evening in the Cable Top 150 with a 0.44 rating in the 18-49 demographic, their best key demographic rating since the October 23, 2019 episode of Dynamite.

== Comparisons between NXT and Dynamite ==
=== Viewership ===
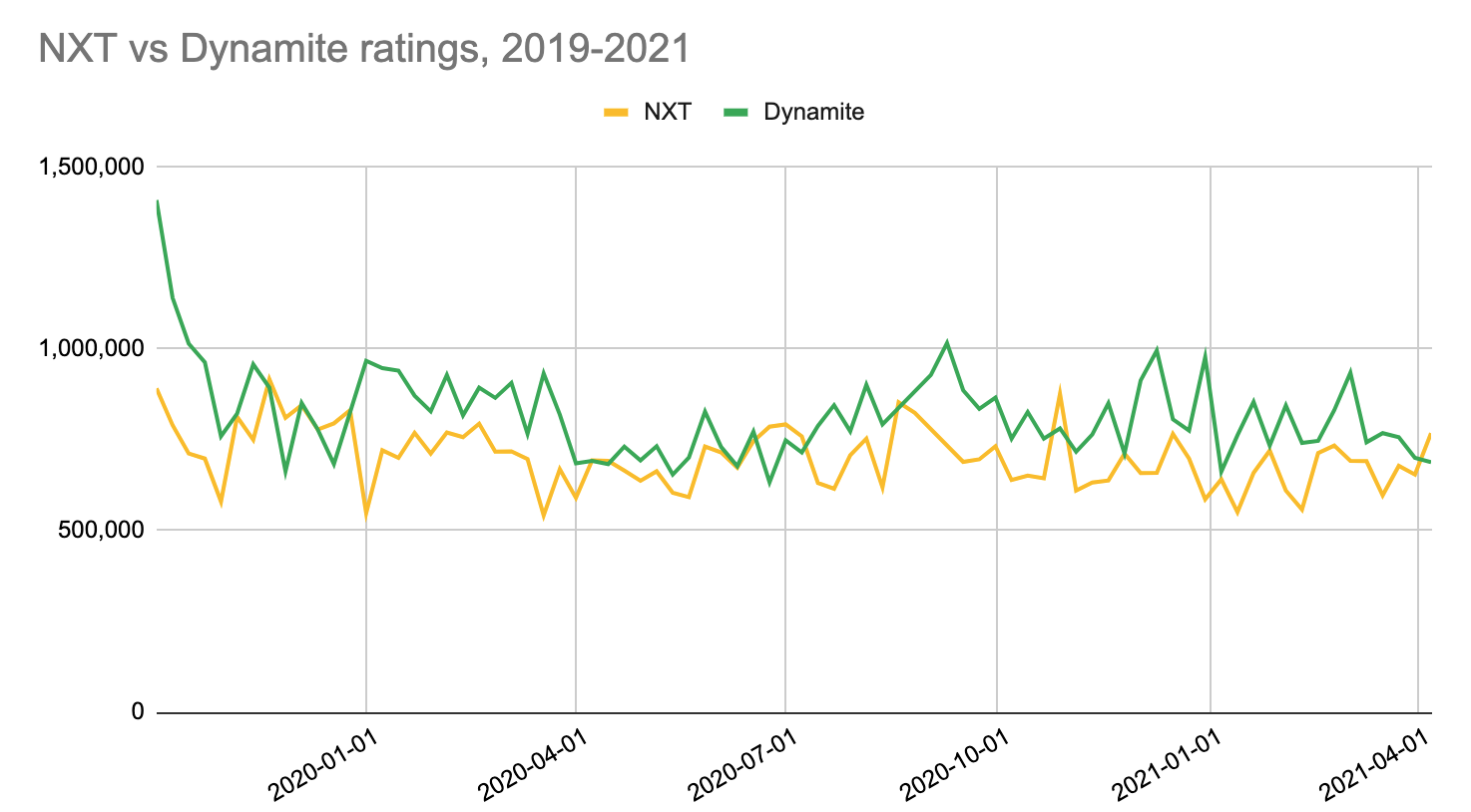
Viewership ratings

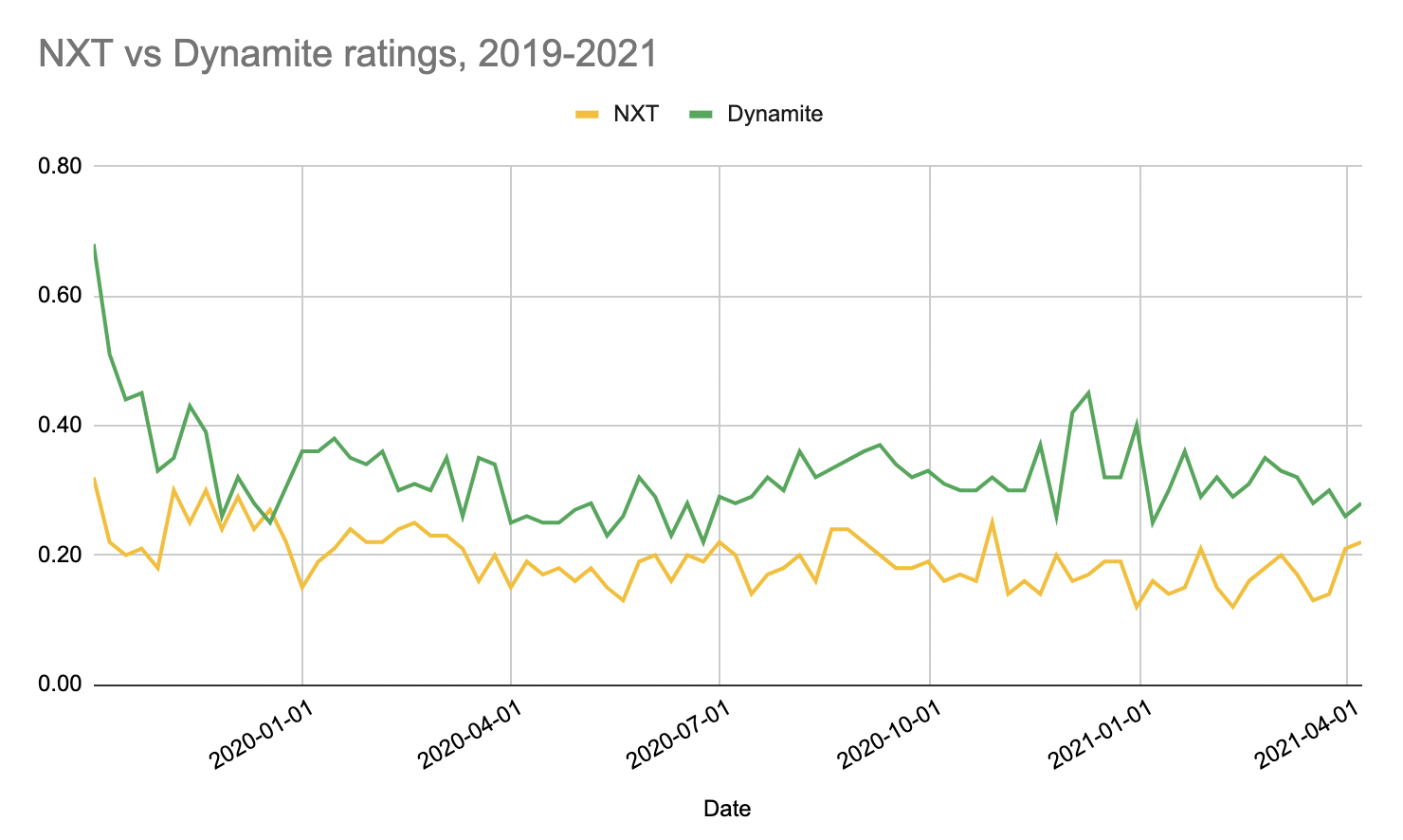
Key demographic ratings

Date	NXT	Dynamite
October 2, 2019	891,000	1,409,000
October 9, 2019	790,000	1,140,000 (Note: Dynamite was simulcast on TNT (0.46, 1,018,000) and TruTV (0.05, 122,000), due to scheduling conflicts with the 2019 MLB playoffs.)
October 16, 2019	712,000	1,014,000
October 23, 2019	698,000	963,000
October 30, 2019	580,000	759,000
November 6, 2019	813,000	822,000
November 13, 2019	750,000	957,000
November 20, 2019	916,000	893,000
November 27, 2019	810,000	663,000
December 4, 2019	845,000	851,000
December 11, 2019	778,000	778,000
December 18, 2019	795,000	683,000
December 25, 2019	831,000	Not aired (Note: Dynamite was not aired due to coinciding with Christmas Day.)
January 1, 2020	548,000	967,000
January 8, 2020	721,000	947,000
January 15, 2020	700,000	940,000
January 22, 2020	769,000	871,000
January 29, 2020	712,000	828,000
February 5, 2020	770,000	928,000
February 12, 2020	757,000	817,000
February 19, 2020	794,000	893,000
February 26, 2020	717,000	865,000
March 4, 2020	718,000	906,000
March 11, 2020	697,000	766,000
March 18, 2020	542,000	932,000
March 25, 2020	669,000	819,000
April 1, 2020	590,000	685,000
April 8, 2020	693,000	692,000
April 15, 2020	692,000	683,000
April 22, 2020	665,000	731,000
April 29, 2020	637,000	693,000
May 6, 2020	663,000	732,000
May 13, 2020	604,000	654,000
May 20, 2020	592,000	701,000
May 27, 2020	731,000	827,000
June 3, 2020	715,000	730,000
June 10, 2020	673,000	677,000
June 17, 2020	746,000	772,000
June 24, 2020	786,000	633,000
July 1, 2020	792,000	748,000
July 8, 2020	759,000	715,000
July 15, 2020	631,000	788,000
July 22, 2020	615,000	845,000
July 29, 2020	707,000	773,000
August 5, 2020	753,000	901,000
August 12, 2020	619,000	792,000
August 19, 2020	853,000	Not aired (Note: Dynamite (0.31, 755,000) aired on Saturday, August 22, due to scheduling conflicts with the 2020 NBA playoffs.)
August 26, 2020	824,000	Not aired (Note: Dynamite (0.29, 813,000) aired on Thursday, August 27, due to scheduling conflicts with the 2020 NBA playoffs.)
September 2, 2020	Not aired (Note: NXT (0.26, 849,000) aired on Tuesday, September 1, due to scheduling conflicts with the 2020 Stanley Cup playoffs.)	928,000
September 9, 2020	Not aired (Note: NXT (0.22, 838,000) aired on Tuesday, September 8, due to scheduling conflicts with the 2020 Stanley Cup playoffs.)	1,016,000
September 16, 2020	689,000	886,000
September 23, 2020	696,000	835,000
September 30, 2020	732,000	866,000
October 7, 2020	639,000	753,000
October 14, 2020	651,000	826,000
October 21, 2020	644,000	753,000
October 28, 2020	876,000	781,000
November 4, 2020	610,000	717,000
November 11, 2020	632,000	764,000
November 18, 2020	638,000	850,000
November 25, 2020	712,000	712,000
December 2, 2020	658,000	913,000
December 9, 2020	659,000	995,000
December 16, 2020	766,000	806,000
December 23, 2020	698,000	775,000 (Note: No head-to-head competition due to Dynamite airing at a later time because of an NBA game which aired on TNT.)
December 30, 2020	586,000	977,000
January 6, 2021	641,000	662,000
January 13, 2021	551,000	762,000
January 20, 2021	659,000	854,000
January 27, 2021	720,000	734,000
February 3, 2021	610,000	844,000
February 10, 2021	558,000	741,000
February 17, 2021	713,000	747,000
February 24, 2021	734,000	831,000
March 3, 2021	692,000	934,000
March 10, 2021	691,000	743,000
March 17, 2021	597,000	768,000
March 24, 2021	678,000	757,000
March 31, 2021	654,000	700,000
April 7, 2021	768,000	688,000
NXT win	Dynamite win	Tie
Program ran unopposed
Overall score Dynamite: 63; NXT: 10; Tie: 2 Ratings unavailable or program not aired: 5

=== Key demographic (18-49) ===
Date	NXT	Dynamite
October 2, 2019	0.32	0.68
October 9, 2019	0.22	0.51
October 16, 2019	0.20	0.44
October 23, 2019	0.21	0.45
October 30, 2019	0.18	0.33
November 6, 2019	0.30	0.35
November 13, 2019	0.25	0.43
November 20, 2019	0.30	0.39
November 27, 2019	0.24	0.26
December 4, 2019	0.29	0.32
December 11, 2019	0.24	0.28
December 18, 2019	0.27	0.25
December 25, 2019	0.22	Not aired
January 1, 2020	0.15	0.36
January 8, 2020	0.19	0.36
January 15, 2020	0.21	0.38
January 22, 2020	0.24	0.35
January 29, 2020	0.22	0.34
February 5, 2020	0.22	0.36
February 12, 2020	0.24	0.30
February 19, 2020	0.25	0.31
February 26, 2020	0.23	0.30
March 4, 2020	0.23	0.35
March 11, 2020	0.21	0.26
March 18, 2020	0.16	0.35
March 25, 2020	0.20	0.34
April 1, 2020	0.15	0.25
April 8, 2020	0.19	0.26
April 15, 2020	0.17	0.25
April 22, 2020	0.18	0.25
April 29, 2020	0.16	0.27
May 6, 2020	0.18	0.28
May 13, 2020	0.15	0.23
May 20, 2020	0.13	0.26
May 27, 2020	0.19	0.32
June 3, 2020	0.20	0.29
June 10, 2020	0.16	0.23
June 17, 2020	0.20	0.28
June 24, 2020	0.19	0.22
July 1, 2020	0.22	0.29
July 8, 2020	0.20	0.28
July 15, 2020	0.14	0.29
July 22, 2020	0.17	0.32
July 29, 2020	0.18	0.30
August 5, 2020	0.20	0.36
August 12, 2020	0.16	0.32
August 19, 2020	0.24	Not aired
August 26, 2020	0.24	Not aired
September 2, 2020	Not aired	0.36
September 9, 2020	Not aired	0.37
September 16, 2020	0.18	0.34
September 23, 2020	0.18	0.32
September 30, 2020	0.19	0.33
October 7, 2020	0.16	0.31
October 14, 2020	0.17	0.30
October 21, 2020	0.16	0.30
October 28, 2020	0.25	0.32
November 4, 2020	0.14	0.30
November 11, 2020	0.16	0.30
November 18, 2020	0.14	0.37
November 25, 2020	0.20	0.26
December 2, 2020	0.16	0.42
December 9, 2020	0.17	0.45
December 16, 2020	0.19	0.32
December 23, 2020	0.19	0.32
December 30, 2020	0.12	0.40
January 6, 2021	0.16	0.25
January 13, 2021	0.14	0.30
January 20, 2021	0.15	0.36
January 27, 2021	0.21	0.29
February 3, 2021	0.15	0.32
February 10, 2021	0.12	0.29
February 17, 2021	0.16	0.31
February 24, 2021	0.18	0.35
March 3, 2021	0.20	0.33
March 10, 2021	0.17	0.32
March 17, 2021	0.13	0.28
March 24, 2021	0.14	0.30
March 31, 2021	0.21	0.26
April 7, 2021	0.22	0.28
NXT win	Dynamite win	Tie
Program ran unopposed
Overall score Dynamite: 74; NXT: 1 Ratings unavailable or program not aired: 5

== See also ==
- History of professional wrestling
- Monday Night War
- TNA Impact!'s move to Monday nights
