= Kenneth Anderson =

Ken or Kenneth Anderson may refer to:

== Entertainment ==
- Ken Anderson (animator) (1909–1993), art director, writer, and animator at Disney
- Ken Anderson (filmmaker) (1917–2006), Christian filmmaker
- Kenneth Anderson (musician) (born 1958), musician and choir director of the Gospel tradition
- Kenneth Anderson (writer) (1910–1974), Indian writer and hunter
- Kenny Anderson (born 1967), Scottish musician known by the stage name King Creosote
- Ken Anderson (wrestler) (born 1976), American professional wrestler

== Sports ==
- Kenneth Anderson (footballer) (1875–1900), Scottish footballer (Queen's Park, national team)
- Ken Anderson (basketball) (born 1933), American basketball coach
- Ken Anderson (quarterback) (born 1949), American football quarterback
- Kenny Anderson (basketball) (born 1970), American basketball point guard
- Ken Anderson (defensive lineman) (1975–2009), American football defensive lineman
- Kenny Anderson (boxer) (born 1983), Scottish boxer
- Kenny Anderson (footballer) (born 1992), Dutch-Scottish footballer
- Ken Anderson (motorsport), engineer and principal of the US F1 Formula One team

== Other ==
- Kenneth Lewis Anderson (1805–1845), lawyer, last vice president of the Republic of Texas
- Kenneth Anderson (British Army officer) (1891–1959), British Army general
- Sir Kenneth Anderson, 1st Baronet (1866–1942), British shipowner
- Ken Anderson (politician) (1909–1985), Australian senator
- Ken Anderson (Texas prosecutor), in Michael Morton case
- Kenneth Anderson (jurist), law professor at Washington College of Law
- Kenny Anderson (The Office), a character from the American TV sitcom The Office
- Kenneth C. Anderson (physician), American hematologist-oncologist and cancer researcher

== See also ==
- Kennet Andersson (born 1967), Swedish football player
