= 1972 NAIA basketball tournament =

College basketball tournament

1972 NAIA men's basketball tournament
- Teams: 32
- Finals site: Municipal Auditorium, Kansas City, Missouri
- Champions: Kentucky State (3 title, 3 title game)
- Runner-up: Wisconsin Eau Claire (1 title game, 1 Final Four)
- Semifinalists: Stephen F. Austin (1 Final Four); Gardner–Webb (1 Final Four)
- Coach of the year: Ken Anderson (Wisconsin-Eau Claire)
- Charles Stevenson Hustle Award: Frank Schade (Wisconsin Eau Claire)
- MVP: Travis Grant (Kentucky State)

The 1972 NAIA men's basketball tournament was held in March at Municipal Auditorium in Kansas City, Missouri. The 35th annual NAIA basketball tournament featured 32 teams playing in a single-elimination format.

This year was the first and only tournament since seeding began in 1957 that all four top seeded teams made it to the national semi-finals. Seeding was changed in 2016, so each bracket is now seeded 1 through 8. Kentucky State became the second team to win three titles in a row, joining Tennessee State (1957, 1958, 1959).

== Awards and honors ==
- Leading scorer: Travis Grant, Kentucky State
- Leading rebounder: Mike Ratliff, Wisconsin-Eau Claire 81 rebounds in 5 games.
- Player of the year: est. 1994
- Most points single game: 60, Travis Grant, Kentucky State vs. Minot State (N.D.)
- Most points single tournament: 213, Travis Grant, Kentucky State
- Most points, career: 518, Travis Grant, Kentucky State, 1970-71-72
- Most field goals made, game: 27, Travis Grant, Kentucky State vs. Minot State (N.D.)
- Most field goals made, tournament: 89, Travis Grant, Kentucky State
- Most field goals made, career: 223, Travis Grant, Kentucky State, 1970-71-72

== 1972 NAIA bracket ==
First round	Second round
1	Wisconsin-Eau Claire	96
-	Bishop (Tex.)	65
1	Wisconsin-Eau Claire	59
16	Belhaven	52
-	Quinnipiac (Conn.)	64
16	Belhaven (Miss.)	75
TOP TIER
9	Augustana (Ill.)	103
-	Kearney State (Neb.)	96
9	Augustana	76
8	Glenville State	75
-	Missouri Southern State	66
8	Glenville State (W.Virginia)	68
5	Western Washington State	66
-	Findlay (Ohio)	63
5	Western Washington State	74
12	Northeastern State	68
-	Glassboro State (N.J.)	69
12	Northeastern State (Okla.)	87
TOP TIER
13	Pittsburg State (Kan.)	98
-	Western Carolina (N.C.)	75
13	Pittsburg State	87
4	Gardner–Webb	91
-	Eastern Montana	94
4	Gardner–Webb (N.C.)	109
3	Kentucky State	118
-	Minot State (N.D.)	68
3	Kentucky State	112
14	West Georgia	83
-	Northwestern (Iowa)	69
14	West Georgia	73
BOTTOM TIER
11	St. Thomas (Minn.)	78
-	Tri-State (Ind.)	61
11	St. Thomas	93
6	Ouachita Baptist	87
-	Elizabeth City State (N.C.)	89
6	Ouachita Baptist (Ark.)	90*
7	Xavier (La.)	102
-	Maryland-Eastern Shore	80
7	Xavier	59
10	Westmont	71
-	Edinboro State (Pa.)	72
10	Westmont (California)	91
BOTTOM TIER
15	Willamette (Ore.)	65
-	Adams State (Colo.)	78
-	Adams State	77
2	Stephen F. Austin State	87
-	Hillsdale (Mich.)	61
2	Stephen F. Austin (Tex.)	71

Elite Eight
1	Wisconsin-Eau Claire	77
9	Augustana	70
5	Western Washington State	75
4	Gardner–Webb	81
3	Kentucky State	66
11	St. Thomas	57
10	Westmont	62
2	Stephen F. Austin State	72

NAIA national semifinals
1	Wisconsin-Eau Claire	83
4	Gardner–Webb	68
3	Kentucky State	87
2	Stephen F. Austin State	82

NAIA national championship
1	Wisconsin-Eau Claire	62
3	Kentucky State	71

- * denotes overtime.

=== Third-place game ===
The third-place game featured the losing teams from the national semifinalist to determine third and fourth places in the tournament. This game was played until 1988.

NAIA third-place game
4	Gardner–Webb	91
2	Stephen F. Austin State	94

== See also ==
- 1972 NCAA University Division basketball tournament
- 1972 NCAA College Division basketball tournament
