= Ken Anderson (basketball) =

American college basketball coach (born 1933)

Biographical details
- Born: January 16, 1933 (age 93)

Coaching career (HC unless noted)
- 1968–1995: Wisconsin–Eau Claire

Accomplishments and honors

Championships
- 14 WIAC regular season (1970–1974, 1976, 1977, 1979–1982, 1987, 1989, 1991); 14 NAIA District 14 (1970–1972, 1974, 1979–1982, 1986–1991)

Awards
- 3× NAIA Coach of the Year (1972, 1980, 1981); NAIA Hall of Fame (1990)

Ken Anderson (born January 16, 1933) is an American former college basketball coach who spent 27 seasons at the University of Wisconsin-Eau Claire. His winning percentage of .806 ranks third in college basketball history, behind only Mark Few and Adolph Rupp, and one spot ahead of John Wooden.

== Coaching career ==
=== High school ===
After graduating from UW–Eau Claire in 1955, Anderson began his coaching career at the high school level, with stops in Auburndale, Plymouth, Superior, and Wausau, compiling a 239–75 record with three state tournament appearances over 12 years among the schools.

=== Fort Lewis ===
Anderson's tenure in Superior was interrupted by the Berlin Crisis of 1961. While stationed at Fort Lewis as a U.S. Army Reserve Special Services Officer, he posted a 41–5 record as the coach of the Fort Lewis Rangers, whose roster included Green Bay Packers players Ray Nitschke and Boyd Dowler.

=== UW–Eau Claire ===
Anderson was hired in 1968 by Eau Claire to succeed W.L. Zorn, who had retired following a 7–13 campaign. Anderson brought immediate results to the Blugolds, finishing his first season with a 14–8 record. Eau Claire won the first of five consecutive Wisconsin State University Conference titles in his second year, and advanced to the NAIA National Tournament, where they lost to eventual champion Kentucky State in the second round. The Blugolds returned to the NAIA tournament the following year, but were defeated in the quarterfinals by Eastern Michigan. The senior-laden 1972 team led by Mike Ratliff and Frank Schade advanced to the championship game, but were done in by a 39-point performance by Travis Grant as Kentucky State claimed a third consecutive title, 71–62.

After five more trips to the NAIA tournament in Kansas City, including returns to the Final Four in 1980 and 1981, as well as a gold medal as coach of the United States team at the 1979 World University Games in Mexico City, Anderson was named head coach at the University of Wisconsin after the 1981–82 season. But with Badger athletic director Elroy Hirsch infamously on a Caribbean cruise, Anderson was repeatedly referred to by the wrong name at his introductory press conference, and he resigned four days later to return to Eau Claire.

Following the turbulent offseason, the 1982–83 Blugolds posted the worst record of Anderson's career (15–12), but they soon returned to form, going 25–5 in 1983–84 and beginning a run of seven straight trips to Kansas City in 1985–86. They reached the Final Four in 1989 and returned to the championship game in 1990. However, as in 1972, their title hopes were thwarted by a massive individual effort. Although Duane Bushman scored 30 points for Eau Claire, Stacy Butler's 36 points led Birmingham-Southern to an 88–80 win.

The Blugolds returned to the quarterfinals in 1991 and made one final trip to Kansas City in 1992, but in 1994 Eau Claire became the last of the WSUC universities to switch affiliation from the NAIA to NCAA Division III.

Anderson retired following the 1994–95 season, having compiled a record of 631–152, including 343–89 in WSUC play with 14 conference titles in his 27 years at the helm. His teams went 41–7 in NAIA District 14 playoff games, reaching the NAIA tournament 15 times and advancing to the Elite Eight eight times, the Final Four five times, and the national championship game twice. Anderson's record in NAIA national tournament games was 28–16, despite the fact that Eau Claire – like all WSUC universities, but unlike much of their competition – did not offer athletic scholarships. He was inducted into the NAIA Hall of Fame in 1990. In 2012, the playing surface at UW–Eau Claire's W.L. Zorn Arena, where Anderson amassed a 387–44 home record, was dedicated as Ken Anderson Court.

== Head coaching record ==
Record table
Season	Team	Overall	Conference	Standing	Postseason
UW–Eau Claire Blugolds (Wisconsin State University Conference) (1968–1995)
1968–1969	UW–Eau Claire	14–8	11–5	3rd	
1969–1970	UW–Eau Claire	24–2	15–1	1st	NAIA Second Round
1970–1971	UW–Eau Claire	26–2	16–0	1st	NAIA Elite Eight
1971–1972	UW–Eau Claire	29–2	16–0	1st	NAIA Runner–up
1972–1973	UW–Eau Claire	21–4	14–2	T–1st	
1973–1974	UW–Eau Claire	24–5	14–2	T–1st	NAIA First Round
1974–1975	UW–Eau Claire	19–7	11–5	T–3rd	
1975–1976	UW–Eau Claire	25–3	14–2	1st	
1976–1977	UW–Eau Claire	22–6	13–3	1st	
1977–1978	UW–Eau Claire	20–7	11–5	T–2nd	
1978–1979	UW–Eau Claire	24–7	12–4	1st	NAIA Second Round
1979–1980	UW–Eau Claire	30–4	15–1	1st	NAIA Final Four
1980–1981	UW–Eau Claire	29–5	14–2	1st	NAIA Final Four
1981–1982	UW–Eau Claire	26–6	13–3	T–1st	NAIA Elite Eight
1982–1983	UW–Eau Claire	15–12	9–7	5th	
1983–1984	UW–Eau Claire	25–5	13–3	3rd	
1984–1985	UW–Eau Claire	24–5	13–3	2nd	
1985–1986	UW–Eau Claire	24–7	11–5	3rd	NAIA Second Round
1986–1987	UW–Eau Claire	26–4	13–3	T–1st	NAIA First Round
1987–1988	UW–Eau Claire	23–8	11–5	3rd	NAIA Second Round
1988–1989	UW–Eau Claire	29–4	14–2	T–1st	NAIA Final Four
1989–1990	UW–Eau Claire	30–4	14–2	2nd	NAIA Runner–up
1990–1991	UW–Eau Claire	29–3	14–2	1st	NAIA Elite Eight
1991–1992	UW–Eau Claire	20–9	11–5	3rd	NAIA First Round
1992–1993	UW–Eau Claire	19–7	12–4	3rd	
1993–1994	UW–Eau Claire	19–6	11–5	3rd	
1994–1995	UW–Eau Claire	15–10	8–8	4th	
UW–Eau Claire:		631–152	343–89		
Total:		631–152			
National champion Postseason invitational champion Conference regular season champion Conference regular season and conference tournament champion Division regular season champion Division regular season and conference tournament champion Conference tournament champion

== See also ==
- List of college men's basketball coaches with 600 wins
- Kenneth Anderson
