= Kenneth Anderson (musician) =

American musician

Kenneth Anderson (born January 6, 1958) is a musician and choir director of the gospel music tradition. Anderson currently serves as director of the Martin Luther King, Jr. Community Choir San Diego, the University of California, San Diego Gospel Choir, and the Grossmont College Gospel Choir. Anderson is also on the voice faculty of Grossmont College in El Cajon, California as well as UC San Diego in La Jolla, California. He also serves as an associate pastor and choir director of Grace San Diego in the North Park neighborhood of San Diego.

== Early life ==
Born in Oklahoma City, Anderson moved to San Diego with his mother shortly thereafter. He started playing piano at church by the age of 6, with formal lessons beginning at age 11 with Joseph Taylor. At the age of 16, he became the choir director of Mount Olive Church of God in Christ in San Diego. Aside from gospel music, Anderson was heavily influenced and inspired by classical music at an early age. Anderson attended Patrick Henry High School and was a member of the honor society until graduation in 1976. Anderson graduated from UC San Diego with a bachelor's in electronics engineering.

== Choir directing ==
Ken Anderson taught choir at Curie Elementary School for 22 years. He also taught at Olivewood Elementary in National City, CA.

In 1989 Anderson became the director of the University of California San Diego Gospel Choir. Taught as a class, the enrollment at one time reached 1,600 people. The enrollment now caps at 800 with an average around 600 per semester. In October 2010, Anderson was one of 8 teachers honored in the UC San Diego Teaching Awards.

In 1996 Anderson became the director of the Martin Luther King, Jr. Community Choir San Diego, a non-profit organization that raises money for seniors in high school pursuing higher education specifically in the visual and performing arts. As of 2008, the choir has raised over $100,000 in educational grants towards 54 different students. The choir has performed throughout San Diego County, the western United States, and Europe, and has been invited to Carnegie Hall in New York City on multiple occasions.

In 2006, Anderson was approached by the Grossmont College Music Department to start a gospel choir. Currently, the choir is in the process of recording a studio album of popular gospel traditions. Under Anderson's direction, the choir has also been invited to Carnegie Hall.

== Voice teacher and solo vocalist ==
Classically trained by Eileen Moss since his early 20s, Anderson has been an active solo performer in San Diego in gospel and classical genres. His roles have included 'Joe the Loiterer' in the La Jolla Symphony & Chorus production of the opera "The Mother of Us All", and 'Judas' in "Jesus Christ Superstar". In 2009 he played the role of 'The Celebrant' in Bernstein's Mass. He was also cast in San Diego Opera's 2008 production of Aida.

Anderson teaches class voice at Grossmont College along with his private voice students from throughout San Diego County.

== Other Notes ==
Anderson has raised ten foster children since 1988, which he finds "very fulfilling".
