= Kenneth C. Anderson (physician) =

American hematologist and oncologist

- Education: Johns Hopkins School of Medicine; Harvard Medical School
- Scientific career
- Fields: Oncology
- Workplaces: Dana–Farber Cancer Institute

Kenneth C. Anderson is an American hematologist-oncologist and cancer researcher who is primarily known for advances in the treatment of multiple myeloma. He directs the Lebow Institute for Myeloma Therapeutics and Jerome Lipper Myeloma Center at Dana–Farber Cancer Institute and is the Kraft Family Professor of Medicine and Vice Chair of the Joint Program in Transfusion Medicine at Harvard Medical School.

== Biography ==
After completing his Bachelor's degree in Biology at Boston University, Anderson completed medical school and residency training at the Johns Hopkins School of Medicine, and he completed an oncology fellowship at Dana–Farber Cancer Institute. He continued his medical career at Dana-Farber as a physician and researcher with a special interest in multiple myeloma. Anderson sits on the board of directors for the Multiple Myeloma Research Foundation and chairs the organization's scientific advisory committee.

In 2010, Anderson was elected to the Institute of Medicine. The American Association for Cancer Research elected him a fellow of the AACR Academy in 2015. In 2017, he served as the president of the American Society of Hematology (ASH). He is a past recipient of ASH's William Dameshek Prize. Anderson is the editor-in-chief of the journal Clinical Cancer Research.
