= Vonteego Cummings =

American basketball player (born 1976)

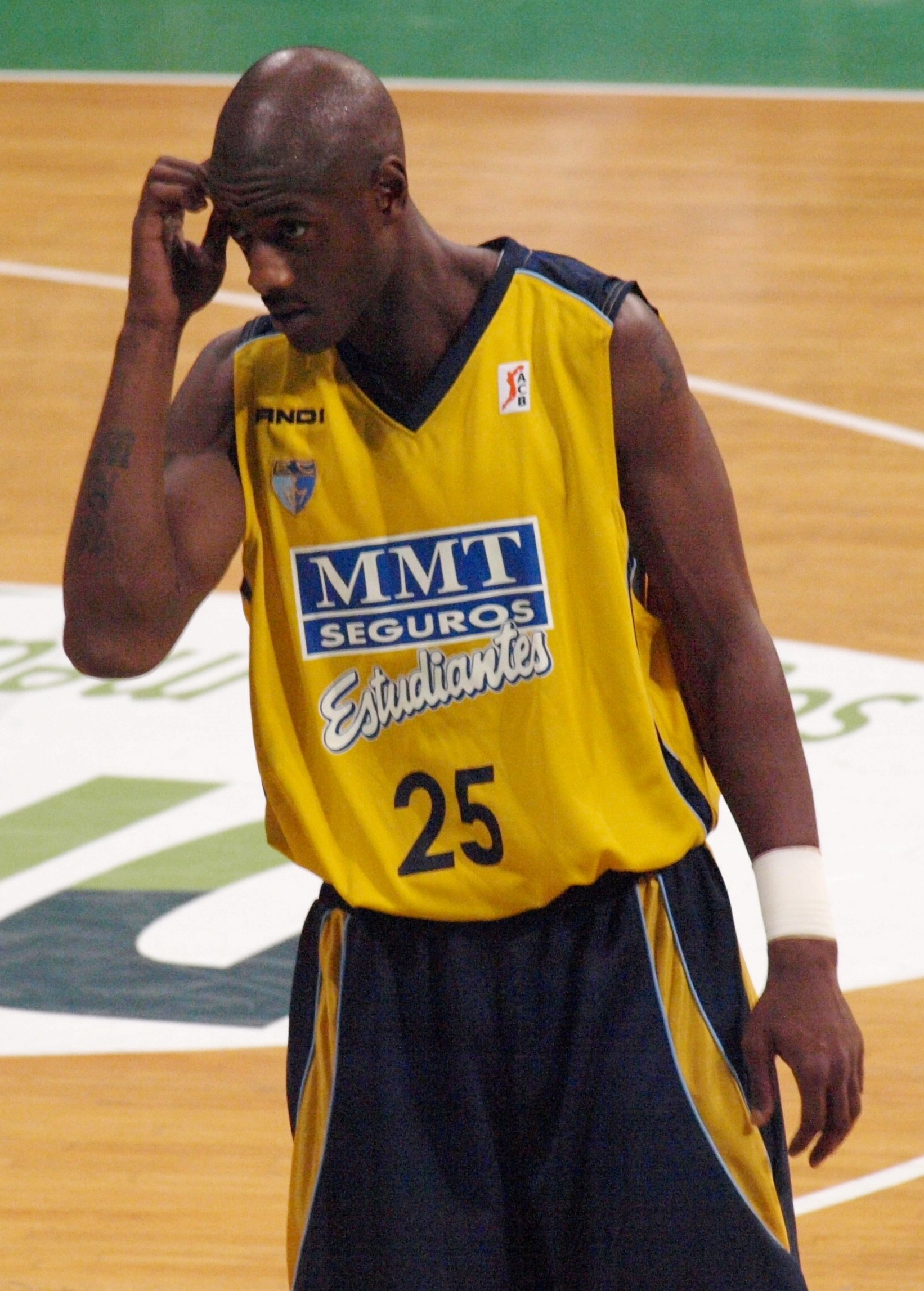
- Cummings with Estudiantes in 2008

Personal information
- Born: February 29, 1976 (age 50) Thomson, Georgia, U.S.
- Listed height: 6 ft 3 in (1.91 m)
- Listed weight: 190 lb (86 kg)

Career information
- High school: Thomson (Thomson, Georgia)
- College: Pittsburgh (1995–1999)
- NBA draft: 1999: 1st round, 26th overall pick
- Drafted by: Indiana Pacers
- Playing career: 1999–2015
- Position: Point guard / shooting guard
- Number: 5, 25

Career history
- 1999–2001: Golden State Warriors
- 2001–2002: Philadelphia 76ers
- 2003: Westchester Wildfire
- 2003–2004: Carisbo Castelmaggiore
- 2004: Westchester Wildfire
- 2004–2005: Hemofarm
- 2005–2006: Fort Worth Flyers
- 2006–2007: Partizan
- 2007–2008: Maccabi Tel Aviv
- 2008: Estudiantes
- 2009: Vojvodina Srbijagas
- 2009: Cedevita
- 2009–2010: Ilysiakos
- 2010–2011: Keravnos
- 2011–2012: Trefl Sopot
- 2015: Atenienses de Manatí

Career highlights
- 2x Adriatic League Final Four MVP (2006, 2007); Basketball League of Serbia champion (2007); Serbia and Montenegro League champion (2006); 2× ABA League champion (2005, 2007)
- Stats at NBA.com
- Stats at Basketball Reference

Vonteego Marfeek Cummings (born February 29, 1976) is an American former professional basketball player. A 6 ft 3 in (1.91 m) combo guard, he played in the National Basketball Association (NBA) and also had a successful career in Europe, where he played in several countries.

== Professional career ==
=== NBA career ===
Cummings was selected with the 26th overall pick by the Indiana Pacers in 1999. On draft night, he was traded to the Golden State Warriors for forward-center Jeff Foster and a 2001 first-round pick (which was used to select Troy Murphy).

Cummings was thrusted into the starting line - up for his very first game on November 2, 1999 where the Warriors were defeated by the Dallas Mavericks 96 - 108. In his debut, Cummings played for nearly 38 minutes and recorded 13 points, 6 rebounds and 4 assists. He would then start in 10 more games in his rookie season but mostly come off the bench as a backup for Mookie Blaylock. Although he finished the season with solid averages of 9.4 points, 2.5 rebounds and 3.3 assists, the Warriors would finish the season 19 - 63 and miss the playoffs.

A similar turnout would happen for Cummings' second year in the league. He started in 11 of the 66 games he played and averaged 7.3 points, 2.1 rebounds and 3.4 assists in 22.7 minutes per game. This time however, the Warriors finished with their worst record in franchise history since becoming Golden State by posting a record of 17 - 65.

On October 25, 2001 Cummings was part of a three-team trade that conclusively sent him and teammate Corie Blount to the Philadelphia 76ers in exchange for Cedric Henderson and a 2005 first-round draft pick (which was used to select Joey Graham). He had a much more reduced role in Philadelphia as he would only play 8.6 minutes per game and average 3.3 points and 1 assist. Although the 76ers finished at the 6th seed with a 43 - 39 record, Cummings would essentially see no playing time in the playoffs. The 76ers were eliminated in the first round in five games (3 - 2) by the Boston Celtics and Cummings only played in Game 3 on April 28, 2002. In that game, Cummings only had one second of playing time as he was substituted in for teammate Aaron McKie with only one second remaining in the fourth quarter when another teammate, Derrick Coleman, was at the free throw line. The 76ers would lose that game fall 103 - 108.

That single playoff match ended up being Cummings' final game of his NBA career. On September 30, 2002, he signed as a free agent with the Cleveland Cavaliers but was waived later on October 19.

In Cummings' three NBA seasons, he averaged 6.9 points, 1.9 rebounds and 2.7 assists, shooting .383 from the field in 199 games (23 starts).

=== European career ===
Cummings played with the Westchester Wildfire of the United States Basketball League (USBL) during the summer of 2003. He began his overseas career in Italy with Carisbo Castelmaggiore in the 2003–04 season. In summer 2004, he again played for the Westchester Wildfire. After that, he returned to Europe and signed with the Serbian team Hemofarm for the 2004–05 season. Cummings started the 2005–06 season with the Fort Worth Flyers of the NBA Development League (NBDL), but in February 2006 he returned to Serbia and signed with Partizan Belgrade until the end of the season. However, he played there and in the 2006–07 season, having a great season especially in the Euroleague, averaging 12.9 points and 3.4 assists over 20 games. These performances secured him a move to Israeli powerhouse Maccabi Tel Aviv, on a two-year deal. However, he was released of the contract in the summer of 2008. His next step was with Estudiantes from Spain, but he stayed there until December when he was released. Until the end of the 2008–09 season, he was at his third stint in Serbia, this time with Vojvodina Srbijagas, and finished with Cedevita of Croatia. Cummings' next station was Greece, where he played the entire 2009–10 season for Ilysiakos. In the 2010–11 season, Cummings played for Keravnos in Cyprus. In October 2011, he signed with the Polish team Trefl Sopot, averaging around 3 points per game in the 2011–12 season.

=== BSN Puerto Rico ===
Cummings, signed a contract with the Atenienses de Manatí of the Baloncesto Superior Nacional (BSN) in Puerto Rico on January 21, 2015, making his comeback to professional basketball after a few years of inactivity. He was released by Atenienses on March 18, 2015 but stuck around with the club for a further three games pending the arrival of Dominique Jones.

== Career statistics ==
Legend
GP	Games played	GS	Games started	MPG	Minutes per game
FG%	Field-goal percentage	3P%	3-point field-goal percentage	FT%	Free-throw percentage
RPG	Rebounds per game	APG	Assists per game	SPG	Steals per game
BPG	Blocks per game	PPG	Points per game	PIR	Performance index rating
**Bold**	Career high

=== NBA ===
==== Regular season ====
Year	Team	GP	GS	MPG	FG%	3P%	FT%	RPG	APG	SPG	BPG	PPG
1999–00	Golden State	**75**	**11**	**23.9**	.405	.325	**.751**	**2.5**	3.3	**1.2**	**.2**	**9.4**
2000–01	Golden State	66	**11**	22.7	.344	**.336**	.681	2.1	**3.4**	1.0	**.2**	7.3
2001–02	Philadelphia	58	1	8.6	**.417**	.261	.750	.9	1.0	.3	.1	3.3
Career		199	23	19.0	.383	.321	.726	1.9	2.7	.9	.2	6.9

==== Playoffs ====
Year	Team	GP	GS	MPG	FG%	3P%	FT%	RPG	APG	SPG	BPG	PPG
2001–02	Philadelphia	1	0	1.0	.000	.000	.000	.0	.0	.0	.0	.0

=== Euroleague ===
Year	Team	GP	GS	MPG	FG%	3P%	FT%	RPG	APG	SPG	BPG	PPG	PIR
2005–06	Partizan	1	1	30.3	.100	.333	.000	2.0	**7.0**	**3.0**	.0	3.0	4.0
2006–07	Partizan	20	20	**34.1**	**.408**	**.380**	**.852**	**2.6**	3.4	1.6	**.2**	**12.9**	**11.4**
2007–08	Maccabi	**24**	**23**	18.1	.383	.260	.792	1.0	2.5	.8	.1	5.4	3.7
Career		45	44	26.1	.389	.333	.838	1.7	3.0	1.2	.1	6.9	7.3
