= 2000 NBA playoffs =

Postseason tournament

Tournament details
- Dates: April 22 – June 19, 2000
- Season: 1999–2000
- Teams: 16

Final positions
- Champions: Los Angeles Lakers (12th title)
- Runners-up: Indiana Pacers
- Semifinalists: New York Knicks; Portland Trail Blazers

Tournament statistics
- Scoring leader(s): Shaquille O'Neal (Lakers) (30.7 PPG)

Awards
- MVP: Shaquille O'Neal (Lakers)

The 2000 NBA playoffs was the postseason tournament of the National Basketball Association's 1999–2000 season. The tournament concluded with the Western Conference champion Los Angeles Lakers defeating the Eastern Conference champion Indiana Pacers four games to two in the 2000 NBA Finals. Shaquille O'Neal was named NBA Finals MVP for the first time in his career.

This was also the first NBA postseason to not have any back-to-backs at all. (After 1988, they were still used in the conference semifinals.)

== Overview ==
The San Antonio Spurs were the champions going into the playoffs, but following a season–ending injury to third–year star Tim Duncan, were eliminated by the Phoenix Suns in the first round, marking the first time since 1987 that a new champion would follow a team enjoying a single season championship tenure. They were also the first defending champion to be eliminated in the first round since the Philadelphia 76ers in 1984.

The Houston Rockets missed the playoffs for the first time since 1992, while the Seattle SuperSonics returned after a one-season absence.

The Toronto Raptors made their NBA playoff debut, becoming the first Canadian team to do so. As such, Game 3 of their first round series against the New York Knicks was the first NBA Playoff game ever played outside the United States.

For the first time in franchise history, the Miami Heat swept a playoff opponent by beating the Detroit Pistons 3–0. It was also their first playoff series victory since 1997, when they made the Conference Finals.

Game 4 of the Trail Blazers-Timberwolves series was Malik Sealy's final NBA Game. He would lose his life in on May 20, when he was driving home after attending Kevin Garnett's birthday party and a drunk driver made a wrong-way turn and crashed into Sealy's car, killing him immediately.

In the conference semifinals, the Miami Heat and New York Knicks met for the fourth consecutive postseason. They did not meet again in the playoffs until 2012.

With their conference semifinals victory over the Utah Jazz, The Portland Trail Blazers advanced to their second consecutive Western Conference Finals. The Trail Blazers did not win another playoff series until 2014.

With a Game 7 win in the conference semifinals, the New York Knicks eliminated the Miami Heat for the third consecutive postseason. The Knicks did not win another playoff series until 2013.

In the Western Conference Finals, the Los Angeles Lakers took a 3–1 series lead, only for the Portland Trail Blazers to force a Game 7. By doing so, the Trail Blazers became the first team since 1982 to force a Game 7 in the Conference Finals despite trailing 3–1.

With their Eastern Conference Finals victory over the New York Knicks, the Indiana Pacers won their first Eastern Conference title after four previous appearances in the Eastern Conference Finals; however, after this season, the team was radically altered with key players Dale Davis, Derrick McKey and Mark Jackson moving to other teams and Rik Smits retiring. Game 6 of the Eastern Conference Finals was the last game Patrick Ewing ever played as a Knick. The Pacers did not win another playoff series until 2004.

In Game 7 of the Western Conference Finals, the Los Angeles Lakers used a 15–0 fourth quarter run to overcome a fifteen-point deficit to defeat the Portland Trail Blazers and make their first NBA Finals since 1991. With the win, the Lakers also avoided the dubious distinction of becoming the seventh team in NBA History to lose a playoff series despite leading 3–1.

The Lakers' NBA Finals win over the Indiana Pacers was the first title for both Shaquille O'Neal and Kobe Bryant, and the first Lakers championship since the 1988 NBA Finals. A.C. Green, the only player left from the Lakers' Showtime era, was in the Lakers starting lineup for this series as well.

== Playoff qualifying ==
=== Eastern Conference ===
The following teams clinched a playoff berth in the East:

1. Indiana Pacers – Central Division champions, Eastern Conference regular season champions (56–26)
2. Miami Heat – Atlantic Division champions (52–30)
3. New York Knicks (50–32)
4. Charlotte Hornets (49–33, 3–1 head-to-head vs. PHI)
5. Philadelphia 76ers (49–33, 1–3 head-to-head vs. CHA)
6. Toronto Raptors (45–37)
7. Detroit Pistons (42–40, 3–1 head-to-head vs. MIL)
8. Milwaukee Bucks (42–40, 1–3 head-to-head vs. DET)

=== Western Conference ===
The following teams clinched a playoff berth in the West:

1. Los Angeles Lakers – Pacific Division champions, Western Conference regular season champions, NBA regular season champions (67–15)
2. Utah Jazz – Midwest Division champions (55–27)
3. Portland Trail Blazers (59–23)
4. San Antonio Spurs (53–29, 2–2 head-to-head vs. PHO)
5. Phoenix Suns (53–29, 2–2 head-to-head vs. SAS)
6. Minnesota Timberwolves (50–32)
7. Seattle SuperSonics (45–37)
8. Sacramento Kings (44–38)

== Bracket ==
This was the outlook for the playoffs. Teams in italics have home court advantage. Teams in bold advance to the next round. Numbers to the left of each team indicate the team's original playoffs seeding in their respective conferences. Numbers to the right of each team indicate the number of games the team won in that round. The division champions possess an asterisk (*)

First Round	Conference Semifinals
**E1**	**Indiana***	**3**
E8	Milwaukee	2
**E1**	**Indiana***	**4**
E5	Philadelphia	2
E4	Charlotte	1
**E5**	**Philadelphia**	**3**
**Eastern Conference**
**E3**	**New York**	**3**
E6	Toronto	0
**E3**	**New York**	**4**
E2	Miami*	3
**E2**	**Miami***	**3**
E7	Detroit	0
**W1**	**LA Lakers***	**3**
W8	Sacramento	2
**W1**	**LA Lakers***	**4**
W5	Phoenix	1
W4	San Antonio	1
**W5**	**Phoenix**	**3**
**Western Conference**
**W3**	**Portland**	**3**
W6	Minnesota	1
**W3**	**Portland**	**4**
W2	Utah*	1
**W2**	**Utah***	**3**
W7	Seattle	2

Conference Finals
**E1**	**Indiana***	**4**
E3	New York	2
**W1**	**LA Lakers***	**4**
W3	Portland	3

NBA Finals
E1	Indiana*	2
**W1**	**LA Lakers***	**4**

- * Division winner
- **Bold** Series winner
- Italic Team with home-court advantage

== First round ==
=== Eastern Conference first round ===
==== (1) Indiana Pacers vs. (8) Milwaukee Bucks ====
TNT

April 23
8:30 PM

Boxscore

Milwaukee Bucks 85, Indiana Pacers 88
Scoring by quarter: 18–28, 16–17, 28–17, 23–26
Pts: Ray Allen 26; Rebs: Ham, Johnson 8 each Asts: Sam Cassell 6	Pts: Jalen Rose 26; Rebs: Dale Davis 17; Asts: Mark Jackson 11
Indiana leads series, 1–0

Conseco Fieldhouse, Indianapolis, Indiana
Attendance: 18,345
Referees: Dick Bavetta, Jack Nies, Don Vaden

TNT

April 27
8:00 PM

Boxscore

Milwaukee Bucks 104, Indiana Pacers 91
Scoring by quarter: 35–19, 26–19, 27–26, 16–27
Pts: Allen, Cassell 20 each Rebs: Ervin Johnson 12; Asts: Sam Cassell 8	Pts: Austin Croshere 16; Rebs: Dale Davis 12; Asts: Mark Jackson 5
Series tied, 1–1

Conseco Fieldhouse, Indianapolis, Indiana
Attendance: 18,345
Referees: Ronnie Nunn, Bennett Salvatore, Derrick Stafford

TNT

April 29
8:30 PM

Boxscore

Indiana Pacers 109, Milwaukee Bucks 96
Scoring by quarter: 23–26, 28–32, 30–20, 28–18
Pts: Reggie Miller 34; Rebs: Austin Croshere 11; Asts: Miller, Rose 5 each	Pts: Allen, Robinson 26 each Rebs: Ervin Johnson 13; Asts: Sam Cassell 12
Indiana leads series, 2–1

Bradley Center, Milwaukee, Wisconsin
Attendance: 18,717
Referees: Hugh Evans, Ken Mauer, Mark Wunderlich

TBS

May 1
9:30 PM

Boxscore

Indiana Pacers 87, Milwaukee Bucks 100
Scoring by quarter: 21–33, 16–31, 25–24, 25–12
Pts: Jalen Rose 17; Rebs: Dale Davis 10; Asts: Mark Jackson 6	Pts: Allen, Williams 20 each Rebs: Ervin Johnson 9 Asts: Sam Cassell 13
Series tied, 2–2

Bradley Center, Milwaukee, Wisconsin
Attendance: 18,072
Referees: Mike Callahan, Jim Clark, Dan Crawford

TNT

May 4
8:00 PM

Boxscore

Milwaukee Bucks 95, Indiana Pacers 96
Scoring by quarter: 30–25, 17–21, 23–25, 25–25
Pts: Sam Cassell 22; Rebs: Tim Thomas 9 Asts: Sam Cassell 6	Pts: Reggie Miller 41; Rebs: Dale Davis 12; Asts: Mark Jackson 8
Indiana wins series, 3–2

Conseco Fieldhouse, Indianapolis, Indiana
Attendance: 18,345
Referees: Joe Crawford, Steve Javie, Eddie F. Rush

- In Game 5, Travis Best hits the eventual series-winning 3 with 16.5 left. Also Reggie Miller scores 18 points in the 4th quarter of game 5.

Regular-season series
Tied 2–2 in the regular-season series

December 18, 1999

Recap

Indiana Pacers 95, Milwaukee Bucks 109

Bradley Center, Milwaukee, Wisconsin

January 19, 2000

Recap

Milwaukee Bucks 84, Indiana Pacers 106

Conseco Fieldhouse, Indianapolis

February 17, 2000

Recap

Indiana Pacers 92, Milwaukee Bucks 90

Bradley Center, Milwaukee, Wisconsin

March 23, 2000

Recap

Milwaukee Bucks 105, Indiana Pacers 84

Conseco Fieldhouse, Indianapolis

This was the second playoff meeting between these two teams, with the Pacers winning the first meeting.

Previous playoff series
Indiana leads 1–0 in all-time playoff series

1999

Indiana Pacers 3, Milwaukee Bucks 0

1999 Eastern Conference First Round

==== (2) Miami Heat vs. (7) Detroit Pistons ====
NBC

April 22
12:30 PM

Boxscore

Detroit Pistons 85, Miami Heat 95
Scoring by quarter: 18–24, 22–20, 18–24, 27–27
Pts: Jerry Stackhouse 23; Rebs: Hill, Williams 9 each Asts: Grant Hill 5	Pts: Jamal Mashburn 29; Rebs: Dan Majerle 10; Asts: Anthony Carter 7
Miami leads series, 1–0

American Airlines Arena, Miami, Florida
Attendance: 16,500
Referees: Terry Durham, Ron Garretson, Tom Washington

TNT

April 25
7:00 PM

Boxscore

Detroit Pistons 82, Miami Heat 84
Scoring by quarter: 19–24, 26–20, 23–21, 14–19
Pts: Jerry Stackhouse 26; Rebs: Stackhouse, Williams 7 each Asts: Grant Hill 4	Pts: Jamal Mashburn 24; Rebs: Alonzo Mourning 8 Asts: Anthony Carter 13
Miami leads series, 2–0

American Airlines Arena, Miami, Florida
Attendance: 16,500
Referees: Joe Crawford, Scott Foster, Jack Nies

NBC

April 29
12:30 PM

Boxscore

Miami Heat 91, Detroit Pistons 72
Scoring by quarter: 18–22, 24–15, 28–15, 21–20
Pts: Clarence Weatherspoon 18; Rebs: Thorpe, Weatherspoon 10 each Asts: Anthony Carter 9	Pts: Jerry Stackhouse 25; Rebs: Christian Laettner 7 Asts: Jerry Stackhouse 3
Miami wins series, 3–0

The Palace of Auburn Hills, Auburn Hills, Michigan
Attendance: 14,507
Referees: Ronnie Nunn, Bennett Salvatore, Derrick Stafford

Regular-season series
Tied 2–2 in the regular-season series

November 2, 1999

Recap

Detroit Pistons 122, Miami Heat 128 (2OT)

Miami Arena, Miami

January 31, 2000

Recap

Detroit Pistons 82, Miami Heat 104

American Airlines Arena, Miami

February 21, 2000

Recap

Miami Heat 87, Detroit Pistons 95

The Palace of Auburn Hills, Auburn Hills, Michigan

April 12, 2000

Recap

Miami Heat 73, Detroit Pistons 90

The Palace of Auburn Hills, Auburn Hills, Michigan

This was the first playoff meeting between the Pistons and the Heat.

==== (3) New York Knicks vs. (6) Toronto Raptors ====
NBC

April 23
12:30 PM

Boxscore

Toronto Raptors 88, New York Knicks 92
Scoring by quarter: 12–27, 25–19, 25–25, 26–21
Pts: Tracy McGrady 25; Rebs: Kevin Willis 11; Asts: Carter, Oakley 6 each	Pts: Houston, Sprewell 21 each Rebs: Patrick Ewing 9 Asts: Charlie Ward 5
New York leads series, 1–0

Madison Square Garden, New York City, New York
Attendance: 19,763
Referees: Dan Crawford, Bob Delaney, Monty McCutchen

TNT

April 26
8:00 PM

Boxscore

Toronto Raptors 83, New York Knicks 84
Scoring by quarter: 26–15, 15–19, 26–21, 16–29
Pts: Vince Carter 27; Rebs: Kevin Willis 10; Asts: Vince Carter 5	Pts: Latrell Sprewell 25; Rebs: Marcus Camby 13; Asts: Allan Houston 4
New York leads series, 2–0

Madison Square Garden, New York City, New York
Attendance: 19,763
Referees: Ted Bernhardt, Terry Durham, Hue Hollins

NBC

April 30
12:30 PM

Boxscore

New York Knicks 87, Toronto Raptors 80
Scoring by quarter: 21–20, 25–25, 15–18, 26–17
Pts: Allan Houston 23; Rebs: Patrick Ewing 11; Asts: Latrell Sprewell 6	Pts: Antonio Davis 18; Rebs: Charles Oakley 14; Asts: Vince Carter 8
New York wins series, 3–0

Air Canada Centre, Toronto, Ontario
Attendance: 19,996
Referees: Joe Forte, Steve Javie, Tommy Nunez Sr.

- In Game 2, Latrell Sprewell hits the game-winner with 7.9 left.

Regular-season series
Toronto won 3–1 in the regular-season series

December 22, 1999

Recap

Toronto Raptors 90, New York Knicks 91

Madison Square Garden, New York City

February 15, 2000

Recap

New York Knicks 70, Toronto Raptors 91

Air Canada Centre, Toronto

February 23, 2000

Recap

Toronto Raptors 99, New York Knicks 88

Madison Square Garden, New York City

April 14, 2000

Recap

New York Knicks 71, Toronto Raptors 86

Air Canada Centre, Toronto, Ontario

This was the first playoff meeting between the Knicks and the Raptors.

==== (4) Charlotte Hornets vs. (5) Philadelphia 76ers ====
TNT

April 22
8:30 PM

Boxscore

Philadelphia 76ers 92, Charlotte Hornets 82
Scoring by quarter: 17–22, 24–22, 34–22, 17–16
Pts: Allen Iverson 40; Rebs: Theo Ratliff 8 Asts: Eric Snow 9	Pts: Derrick Coleman 23; Rebs: Derrick Coleman 16; Asts: David Wesley 4
Philadelphia leads series, 1–0

Charlotte Coliseum, Charlotte, North Carolina
Attendance: 15,023
Referees: Joe Crawford, Joe Forte, Luis Grillo

TBS

April 24
8:00 PM

Boxscore

Philadelphia 76ers 98, Charlotte Hornets 108 (OT)
Scoring by quarter: 20–24, 27–25, 27–22, 17–20, Overtime: 7–17
Pts: Toni Kukoč 20; Rebs: Tyrone Hill 13; Asts: Eric Snow 13	Pts: Derrick Coleman 29; Rebs: Elden Campbell 14; Asts: Eddie Jones 8
Series tied, 1–1

Charlotte Coliseum, Charlotte, North Carolina
Attendance: 11,686
Referees: Terry Durham, Ron Garretson, Ken Mauer

TNT

April 28
8:00 PM

Boxscore

Charlotte Hornets 76, Philadelphia 76ers 81
Scoring by quarter: 18–18, 22–20, 17–19, 19–24
Pts: Eddie Jones 18; Rebs: Derrick Coleman 17; Asts: Anthony Mason 7	Pts: Allen Iverson 24; Rebs: Theo Ratliff 11; Asts: Aaron McKie 5
Philadelphia leads series, 2–1

First Union Center, Philadelphia, Pennsylvania
Attendance: 20,849
Referees: Ted Bernhardt, Hue Hollins, Don Vaden

TNT

May 1
7:00 PM

Boxscore

Charlotte Hornets 99, Philadelphia 76ers 105
Scoring by quarter: 25–30, 25–24, 29–21, 20–30
Pts: Campbell, Mason 21 each Rebs: Campbell, Coleman 11 each Asts: Eddie Jones 8	Pts: Allen Iverson 26; Rebs: Matt Geiger 10; Asts: Aaron McKie 11
Philadelphia wins series, 3–1

First Union Center, Philadelphia, Pennsylvania
Attendance: 20,712
Referees: Mike Mathis, Bennett Salvatore, Bill Spooner

Regular-season series
Charlotte won 3–1 in the regular-season series

December 11, 1999

Recap

Charlotte Hornets 106, Philadelphia 76ers 84

First Union Center, Philadelphia

January 20, 2000

Recap

Philadelphia 76ers 100, Charlotte Hornets 109

Charlotte Coliseum, Charlotte, North Carolina

February 15, 2000

Recap

Charlotte Hornets 95, Philadelphia 76ers 93

First Union Center, Philadelphia

March 20, 2000

Recap

Philadelphia 76ers 102, Charlotte Hornets 96

Charlotte Coliseum, Charlotte, North Carolina

This was the first playoff meeting between the 76ers and the Charlotte Hornets.

=== Western Conference first round ===
==== (1) Los Angeles Lakers vs. (8) Sacramento Kings ====
NBC

April 23
5:30 PM

Boxscore

Sacramento Kings 107, Los Angeles Lakers 117
Scoring by quarter: 28–34, 27–31, 24–26, 28–26
Pts: Chris Webber 28; Rebs: Lawrence Funderburke 6 Asts: Vlade Divac 8	Pts: Shaquille O'Neal 46; Rebs: Shaquille O'Neal 17; Asts: Bryant, Shaw 5 each
LA Lakers lead series, 1–0

Staples Center, Los Angeles, California
Attendance: 18,997
Referees: Mike Callahan, Steve Javie, Eddie F. Rush

TNT

April 27
10:30 PM

Boxscore

Sacramento Kings 89, Los Angeles Lakers 113
Scoring by quarter: 24–35, 17–21, 23–27, 25–30
Pts: Chris Webber 22; Rebs: Chris Webber 12; Asts: Chris Webber 6	Pts: Kobe Bryant 32; Rebs: Shaquille O'Neal 19; Asts: Shaquille O'Neal 6
LA Lakers lead series, 2–0

Staples Center, Los Angeles, California
Attendance: 18,997
Referees: Dick Bavetta, Joe DeRosa, Bernie Fryer

NBC

April 30
5:30 PM

Boxscore

Los Angeles Lakers 91, Sacramento Kings 99
Scoring by quarter: 28–22, 23–24, 20–20, 20–33
Pts: Kobe Bryant 35; Rebs: Shaquille O'Neal 17; Asts: Ron Harper 4	Pts: Chris Webber 29; Rebs: Chris Webber 14; Asts: Chris Webber 8
LA Lakers lead series, 2–1

ARCO Arena, Sacramento, California
Attendance: 17,317
Referees: Bob Delaney, Ron Garretson, Tom Washington

TNT

May 2
10:30 PM

Boxscore

Los Angeles Lakers 88, Sacramento Kings 101
Scoring by quarter: 18–27, 27–29, 21–17, 22–28
Pts: Kobe Bryant 32; Rebs: Shaquille O'Neal 16; Asts: Bryant, Harper 4 each	Pts: Chris Webber 23; Rebs: Chris Webber 13; Asts: Chris Webber 8
Series tied, 2–2

ARCO Arena, Sacramento, California
Attendance: 17,317
Referees: Hugh Evans, Ken Mauer, Greg Willard

TNT

May 5
10:30 PM

Boxscore

Sacramento Kings 86, Los Angeles Lakers 113
Scoring by quarter: 20–31, 24–28, 18–30, 24–24
Pts: Chris Webber 20; Rebs: Tony Delk 6 Asts: Barry, Webber 4 each	Pts: Shaquille O'Neal 32; Rebs: Shaquille O'Neal 18; Asts: Bryant, Rice 6
LA Lakers win series, 3–2

Staples Center, Los Angeles, California
Attendance: 18,997
Referees: Dan Crawford, Jack Nies, Ronnie Nunn

- Shaquille O'Neal scores playoff career-high 46 points in Game One.
- Kobe Bryant scores playoff career-high 32 points in Game Two.
- Bryant scores a new career-high 35 points in Game Three.

Regular-season series
Los Angeles won 3–1 in the regular-season series

December 8, 1999

Recap

Los Angeles Lakers 91, Sacramento Kings 103

ARCO Arena, Sacramento, California

March 12, 2000

Recap

Sacramento Kings 106, Los Angeles Lakers 109

Staples Center, Los Angeles

March 26, 2000

Recap

Los Angeles Lakers 90, Sacramento Kings 89

ARCO Arena, Sacramento, California

April 14, 2000

Recap

Sacramento Kings 114, Los Angeles Lakers 121

Staples Center, Los Angeles

This was the eighth playoff meeting between these two teams, with the Lakers winning six of the first seven meetings.

Previous playoff series
Los Angeles leads 6–1 in all-time playoff series

1949

Minneapolis Lakers 2, Rochester Royals 0

1949 Western Division Finals

1951

Minneapolis Lakers 1, Rochester Royals 3

1951 Western Division Finals

1952

Minneapolis Lakers 3, Rochester Royals 1

1952 Western Division Finals

1954

Minneapolis Lakers 1, Rochester Royals 0

1954 Western Division Round Robin Semifinals

1954

Minneapolis Lakers 2, Rochester Royals 1

1954 Western Division Finals

1955

Minneapolis Lakers 2, Rochester Royals 1

1955 Western Division Semifinals

1984

Los Angeles Lakers 3, Kansas City Kings 0

1984 Western Conference First Round

==== (2) Utah Jazz vs. (7) Seattle SuperSonics ====
NBC

April 22
5:30 PM

Boxscore

Seattle SuperSonics 93, Utah Jazz 104
Scoring by quarter: 25–22, 24–30, 19–31, 25–21
Pts: Gary Payton 24; Rebs: Gary Payton 11; Asts: Gary Payton 6	Pts: Karl Malone 50; Rebs: Karl Malone 12; Asts: Jeff Hornacek 11
Utah leads series, 1–0

Delta Center, Salt Lake City, Utah
Attendance: 19,911
Referees: Ronnie Nunn, Bennett Salvatore, Greg Willard

TBS

April 24
10:30 PM

Boxscore

Seattle SuperSonics 87, Utah Jazz 101
Scoring by quarter: 19–25, 21–32, 19–29, 28–15
Pts: Gary Payton 20; Rebs: Vin Baker 7 Asts: Shammond Williams 10	Pts: Karl Malone 23; Rebs: Greg Ostertag 12; Asts: John Stockton 11
Utah leads series, 2–0

Delta Center, Salt Lake City, Utah
Attendance: 19,911
Referees: Mike Callahan, Steve Javie, Eddie F. Rush

NBC

April 29
5:30 PM

Boxscore

Utah Jazz 78, Seattle SuperSonics 89
Scoring by quarter: 16–20, 18–20, 18–24, 26–25
Pts: Karl Malone 30; Rebs: three players 6 each Asts: John Stockton 13	Pts: Gary Payton 23; Rebs: Vin Baker 11; Asts: Gary Payton 10
Utah leads series, 2–1

KeyArena, Seattle, Washington
Attendance: 16,713
Referees: Dick Bavetta, Joe DeRosa, Bernie Fryer

TNT

May 3
9:00 PM

Boxscore

Utah Jazz 93, Seattle SuperSonics 104
Scoring by quarter: 29–26, 7–24, 35–28, 22–26
Pts: Bryon Russell 26; Rebs: Karl Malone 14; Asts: John Stockton 12	Pts: Gary Payton 35; Rebs: Gary Payton 10; Asts: Gary Payton 11
Series tied, 2–2

KeyArena, Seattle, Washington
Attendance: 16,631
Referees: Jim Clark, Ron Garretson, Mark Wunderlich

TNT

May 5
8:00 PM

Boxscore

Seattle SuperSonics 93, Utah Jazz 96
Scoring by quarter: 18–23, 31–30, 21–26, 23–17
Pts: Gary Payton 27; Rebs: three players 7 each Asts: Gary Payton 9	Pts: Karl Malone 27; Rebs: Karl Malone 8 Asts: John Stockton 15
Utah wins series, 3–2

Delta Center, Salt Lake City, Utah
Attendance: 19,911
Referees: Hugh Evans, Hue Hollins, Don Vaden

Regular-season series
Tied 2–2 in the regular-season series

November 6, 1999

Recap

Utah Jazz 94, Seattle SuperSonics 99

KeyArena, Seattle

December 10, 1999

Recap

Seattle SuperSonics 83, Utah Jazz 101

Delta Center, Salt Lake City

February 1, 2000

Recap

Seattle SuperSonics 104, Utah Jazz 96

Delta Center, Salt Lake City

March 24, 2000

Recap

Utah Jazz 98, Seattle SuperSonics 95

KeyArena, Seattle

This was the fourth playoff meeting between these two teams, with the SuperSonics winning two of the first three meetings.

Previous playoff series
Seattle leads 2–1 in all-time playoff series

1992

Seattle SuperSonics 1, Utah Jazz 4

1992 Western Conference Semifinals

1993

Seattle SuperSonics 3, Utah Jazz 2

1993 Western Conference First Round

1996

Seattle SuperSonics 4, Utah Jazz 3

1996 Western Conference Finals

==== (3) Portland Trail Blazers vs. (6) Minnesota Timberwolves ====
NBC

April 23
3:00 PM

Boxscore

Minnesota Timberwolves 88, Portland Trail Blazers 91
Scoring by quarter: 22–33, 25–15, 28–21, 13–22
Pts: Malik Sealy 23; Rebs: Kevin Garnett 10; Asts: Terrell Brandon 12	Pts: Scottie Pippen 28; Rebs: Scottie Pippen 9 Asts: Damon Stoudamire 4
Portland leads series, 1–0

Rose Garden, Portland, Oregon
Attendance: 19,980
Referees: Jim Clark, Hugh Evans, Mike Mathis

TNT

April 26
10:30 PM

Boxscore

Minnesota Timberwolves 82, Portland Trail Blazers 86
Scoring by quarter: 24–19, 17–21, 17–27, 24–19
Pts: Kevin Garnett 23; Rebs: Kevin Garnett 10; Asts: Terrell Brandon 6	Pts: Scottie Pippen 21; Rebs: Pippen, Wallace 7 each Asts: Damon Stoudamire 6
Portland leads series, 2–0

Rose Garden, Portland, Oregon
Attendance: 20,568
Referees: Dan Crawford, Jess Kersey, Tommy Nunez Sr.

NBC

April 30
3:00 PM

Boxscore

Portland Trail Blazers 87, Minnesota Timberwolves 94
Scoring by quarter: 20–24, 20–23, 28–21, 19–26
Pts: Steve Smith 22; Rebs: Brian Grant 7 Asts: Pippen, Stoudamire 6 each	Pts: Terrell Brandon 28; Rebs: Kevin Garnett 13; Asts: Terrell Brandon 12
Portland leads series, 2–1

Target Center, Minneapolis, Minnesota
Attendance: 19,006
Referees: Joe Crawford, Luis Grillo, Eddie F. Rush

TNT

May 2
8:00 PM

Boxscore

Portland Trail Blazers 85, Minnesota Timberwolves 77
Scoring by quarter: 18–22, 18–18, 21–24, 28–13
Pts: Sabonis, Wallace 15 each Rebs: Arvydas Sabonis 11; Asts: Scottie Pippen 6	Pts: Kevin Garnett 17; Rebs: Kevin Garnett 10; Asts: Kevin Garnett 9
Portland wins series, 3–1

Target Center, Minneapolis, Minnesota
Attendance: 19,006
Referees: Ted Bernhardt, Steve Javie, Don Vaden

Regular-season series
Tied 2–2 in the regular-season series

November 24, 1999

Recap

Portland Trail Blazers 88, Minnesota Timberwolves 81

Target Center, Minneapolis

December 9, 1999

Recap

Minnesota Timberwolves 86, Portland Trail Blazers 90

Rose Garden Arena, Portland, Oregon

January 6, 2000

Recap

Portland Trail Blazers 96, Minnesota Timberwolves 98

Target Center, Minneapolis

March 16, 2000

Recap

Minnesota Timberwolves 96, Portland Trail Blazers 92

Rose Garden Arena, Portland, Oregon

This was the first playoff meeting between the Trail Blazers and the Timberwolves.

==== (4) San Antonio Spurs vs. (5) Phoenix Suns ====
NBC

April 22
3:00 PM

Boxscore

Phoenix Suns 72, San Antonio Spurs 70
Scoring by quarter: 13–17, 28–18, 15–18, 16–17
Pts: Hardaway, Robinson 17 each Rebs: Shawn Marion 9 Asts: Kevin Johnson 6	Pts: Sean Elliott 15; Rebs: Samaki Walker 16; Asts: Elie, Johnson 4 each
Phoenix leads series, 1–0

Alamodome, San Antonio, Texas
Attendance: 21,916
Referees: Bernie Fryer, Hue Hollins, Bill Spooner

TNT

April 25
9:30 PM

Boxscore

Phoenix Suns 70, San Antonio Spurs 85
Scoring by quarter: 20–24, 17–27, 14–9, 19–25
Pts: Penny Hardaway 19; Rebs: Corie Blount 11; Asts: Johnson, Robinson 3 each	Pts: David Robinson 25; Rebs: David Robinson 15; Asts: Avery Johnson 6
Series tied, 1–1

Alamodome, San Antonio, Texas
Attendance: 20,617
Referees: Jim Clark, Hugh Evans, Mike Mathis

NBC

April 29
3:00 PM

Boxscore

San Antonio Spurs 94, Phoenix Suns 101
Scoring by quarter: 27–21, 22–29, 30–19, 15–32
Pts: David Robinson 37; Rebs: David Robinson 13; Asts: Avery Johnson 6	Pts: Penny Hardaway 17; Rebs: Shawn Marion 14; Asts: Penny Hardaway 13
Phoenix leads series, 2–1

America West Arena, Phoenix, Arizona
Attendance: 19,023
Referees: Dan Crawford, Jess Kersey, Greg Willard

TBS

May 2
9:00 PM

Boxscore

San Antonio Spurs 78, Phoenix Suns 89
Scoring by quarter: 21–15, 16–27, 19–26, 22–21
Pts: David Robinson 21; Rebs: David Robinson 16; Asts: Avery Johnson 5	Pts: Hardaway, Rogers 23 each Rebs: Marion, Rogers 10 each Asts: Jason Kidd 10
Phoenix wins series, 3–1

America West Arena, Phoenix, Arizona
Attendance: 19,023
Referees: Joe Crawford, Bob Delaney, Tom Washington

Regular-season series
Tied 2–2 in the regular-season series

November 7, 1999

Recap

San Antonio Spurs 74, Phoenix Suns 77

America West Arena, Phoenix, Arizona

December 21, 1999

Recap

Phoenix Suns 90, San Antonio Spurs 91 (OT)

Alamodome, San Antonio

January 7, 2000

Recap

San Antonio Spurs 102, Phoenix Suns 83

America West Arena, Phoenix, Arizona

February 21, 2000

Recap

Phoenix Suns 98, San Antonio Spurs 89

Alamodome, San Antonio

This was the fifth playoff meeting between these two teams, with each team winning two series apiece.

Previous playoff series
Tied 2–2 in all-time playoff series

1992

Phoenix Suns 3, San Antonio Spurs 0

1992 Western Conference First Round

1993

Phoenix Suns 4, San Antonio Spurs 2

1993 Western Conference Semifinals

1996

Phoenix Suns 1, San Antonio Spurs 3

1996 Western Conference First Round

1998

Phoenix Suns 1, San Antonio Spurs 3

1998 Western Conference First Round

== Conference semifinals ==
=== Eastern Conference semifinals ===
==== (1) Indiana Pacers vs. (5) Philadelphia 76ers ====
NBC

May 6
3:30 PM

Boxscore

Philadelphia 76ers 91, Indiana Pacers 108
Scoring by quarter: 15–34, 22–20, 32–24, 22–30
Pts: Allen Iverson 28; Rebs: George Lynch 14; Asts: Eric Snow 7	Pts: Miller, Rose 40 each Rebs: Austin Croshere 11; Asts: Mark Jackson 10
Indiana leads series, 1–0

Conseco Fieldhouse, Indianapolis, Indiana
Attendance: 18,345
Referees: Terry Durham, Ron Garretson, Ken Mauer

TBS

May 8
8:00 PM

Boxscore

Philadelphia 76ers 97, Indiana Pacers 103
Scoring by quarter: 26–31, 14–24, 23–29, 34–19
Pts: Allen Iverson 28; Rebs: Tyrone Hill 8 Asts: Allen Iverson 10	Pts: Jalen Rose 30; Rebs: Jalen Rose 7 Asts: Mark Jackson 14
Indiana leads series, 2–0

Conseco Fieldhouse, Indianapolis, Indiana
Attendance: 18,345
Referees: Joe Crawford, Bob Delaney, Joe Forte

TNT

May 10
8:00 PM

Boxscore

Indiana Pacers 97, Philadelphia 76ers 89
Scoring by quarter: 22–23, 24–24, 19–23, 32–19
Pts: Reggie Miller 29; Rebs: Dale Davis 17; Asts: Mark Jackson 8	Pts: Allen Iverson 29; Rebs: Tyrone Hill 14; Asts: Toni Kukoč 4
Indiana leads series, 3–0

First Union Center, Philadelphia, Pennsylvania
Attendance: 20,823
Referees: Dan Crawford, Luis Grillo, Hue Hollins

NBC

May 13
3:30 PM

Boxscore

Indiana Pacers 90, Philadelphia 76ers 92
Scoring by quarter: 18–33, 29–25, 24–21, 19–13
Pts: Rik Smits 20; Rebs: Dale Davis 11; Asts: Mark Jackson 7	Pts: Allen Iverson 19; Rebs: Tyrone Hill 15; Asts: Allen Iverson 5
Indiana leads series, 3–1

First Union Center, Philadelphia, Pennsylvania
Attendance: 20,675
Referees: Ronnie Nunn, Bennett Salvatore, Don Vaden

TBS

May 15
8:00 PM

Boxscore

Philadelphia 76ers 107, Indiana Pacers 86
Scoring by quarter: 29–16, 31–21, 23–25, 24–24
Pts: Allen Iverson 37; Rebs: Hill, McKie 10 each Asts: Aaron McKie 9	Pts: Rik Smits 15; Rebs: Dale Davis 8 Asts: Jackson, Rose 6 each
Indiana leads series, 3–2

Conseco Fieldhouse, Indianapolis, Indiana
Attendance: 18,345
Referees: Dick Bavetta, Steve Javie, Tom Washington

TNT

May 19
6:30 PM

Boxscore

Indiana Pacers 106, Philadelphia 76ers 90
Scoring by quarter: 37–25, 19–28, 29–16, 21–21
Pts: Reggie Miller 25; Rebs: Dale Davis 11; Asts: Mark Jackson 11	Pts: Aaron McKie 19; Rebs: Hill, McKie 9 each Asts: Aaron McKie 4
Indiana wins series, 4–2

First Union Center, Philadelphia, Pennsylvania
Attendance: 20,969
Referees: Hugh Evans, Bernie Fryer, Eddie F. Rush

Regular-season series
Tied 2–2 in the regular-season series

January 22, 2000

Recap

Indiana Pacers 97, Philadelphia 76ers 103

First Union Center, Philadelphia

February 7, 2000

Recap

Philadelphia 76ers 84, Indiana Pacers 109

Conseco Fieldhouse, Indianapolis

March 26, 2000

Recap

Philadelphia 76ers 111, Indiana Pacers 101

Conseco Fieldhouse, Indianapolis

April 17, 2000

Recap

Indiana Pacers 92, Philadelphia 76ers 90

First Union Center, Philadelphia

This was the third playoff meeting between these two teams, with each team winning one series apiece.

Previous playoff series
Tied 1–1 in all-time playoff series

1981

Indiana Pacers 0, Philadelphia 76ers 2

1981 Eastern Conference First Round

1999

Indiana Pacers 4, Philadelphia 76ers 0

1999 Eastern Conference Semifinals

==== (2) Miami Heat vs. (3) New York Knicks ====
NBC

May 7
12:30 PM

Boxscore

New York Knicks 83, Miami Heat 87
Scoring by quarter: 19–25, 26–21, 23–22, 15–19
Pts: Allan Houston 21; Rebs: Marcus Camby 13; Asts: Chris Childs 6	Pts: Alonzo Mourning 26; Rebs: P. J. Brown 16; Asts: Tim Hardaway 7
Miami leads series, 1–0

American Airlines Arena, Miami, Florida
Attendance: 20,053
Referees: Joe DeRosa, Mike Mathis, Bennett Salvatore

TNT

May 9
8:00 PM

Boxscore

New York Knicks 82, Miami Heat 76
Scoring by quarter: 23–15, 15–19, 21–16, 23–26
Pts: Ewing, Ward 13 each Rebs: Ewing, Johnson 8 each Asts: Latrell Sprewell 5	Pts: Jamal Mashburn 25; Rebs: Alonzo Mourning 17; Asts: three players 3 each
Series tied, 1–1

American Airlines Arena, Miami, Florida
Attendance: 20,078
Referees: Hugh Evans, Bernie Fryer, Tom Washington

TNT

May 12
8:00 PM

Boxscore

Miami Heat 77, New York Knicks 76 (OT)
Scoring by quarter: 25–21, 11–16, 19–19, 13–12, Overtime: 9–8
Pts: Alonzo Mourning 23; Rebs: P. J. Brown 12; Asts: Anthony Carter 8	Pts: Allan Houston 24; Rebs: Patrick Ewing 9 Asts: Charlie Ward 4
Miami leads series, 2–1

Madison Square Garden, New York City, New York
Attendance: 19,763
Referees: Dan Crawford, Bob Delaney, Hue Hollins

NBC

May 14
12:30 PM

Boxscore

Miami Heat 83, New York Knicks 91
Scoring by quarter: 21–26, 19–16, 17–24, 26–25
Pts: Alonzo Mourning 27; Rebs: Alonzo Mourning 14; Asts: Anthony Carter 7	Pts: Charlie Ward 20; Rebs: Patrick Ewing 11; Asts: Latrell Sprewell 6
Series tied, 2–2

Madison Square Garden, New York City, New York
Attendance: 19,763
Referees: Ron Garretson, Jack Nies, Eddie F. Rush

TNT

May 17
8:00 PM

Boxscore

New York Knicks 81, Miami Heat 87
Scoring by quarter: 22–19, 13–22, 25–23, 21–23
Pts: Latrell Sprewell 24; Rebs: Patrick Ewing 11; Asts: Latrell Sprewell 6	Pts: Jamal Mashburn 21; Rebs: P. J. Brown 12; Asts: Anthony Carter 5
Miami leads series, 3–2

American Airlines Arena, Miami, Florida
Attendance: 20,021
Referees: Mike Callahan, Joe Crawford, Terry Durham

TNT

May 19
9:00 PM

Boxscore

Miami Heat 70, New York Knicks 72
Scoring by quarter: 21–16, 24–14, 13–23, 12–19
Pts: Alonzo Mourning 22; Rebs: Majerle, Mourning 10 each Asts: Dan Majerle 7	Pts: Allan Houston 21; Rebs: Patrick Ewing 18; Asts: Charlie Ward 4
Series tied, 3–3

Madison Square Garden, New York City, New York
Attendance: 19,763
Referees: Joe Forte, Steve Javie, Don Vaden

NBC

May 21
3:30 PM

Boxscore

New York Knicks 83, Miami Heat 82
Scoring by quarter: 16–25, 29–14, 20–26, 18–17
Pts: Latrell Sprewell 24; Rebs: Marcus Camby 12; Asts: Latrell Sprewell 5	Pts: Alonzo Mourning 29; Rebs: Alonzo Mourning 13; Asts: Tim Hardaway 7
New York wins series, 4–3

American Airlines Arena, Miami, Florida
Attendance: 20,063
Referees: Dick Bavetta, Dan Crawford, Bennett Salvatore

Patrick Ewing hits the series winning dunk with 1:21 remaining.

This was the fourth playoff meeting between these two teams, with the Knicks winning two of the first three meetings.

Previous playoff series
New York leads 2–1 in all-time playoff series

1997

Miami Heat 4, New York Knicks 3

1997 Eastern Conference Semifinals

1998

Miami Heat 2, New York Knicks 3

1998 Eastern Conference First Round

1999

Miami Heat 2, New York Knicks 3

1999 Eastern Conference First Round

=== Western Conference semifinals ===
==== (1) Los Angeles Lakers vs. (5) Phoenix Suns ====
NBC

May 7
5:30 PM

Boxscore

Phoenix Suns 77, Los Angeles Lakers 105
Scoring by quarter: 18–18, 23–28, 19–29, 17–30
Pts: Penny Hardaway 25; Rebs: Blount, Kidd 7 each Asts: Jason Kidd 7	Pts: Shaquille O'Neal 37; Rebs: Shaquille O'Neal 14; Asts: Brian Shaw 4
LA Lakers lead series, 1–0

Staples Center, Los Angeles, California
Attendance: 18,997
Referees: Dick Bavetta, Steve Javie, Don Vaden

TNT

May 10
10:30 PM

Boxscore

Phoenix Suns 96, Los Angeles Lakers 97
Scoring by quarter: 26–24, 18–26, 21–24, 31–23
Pts: Clifford Robinson 30; Rebs: Blount, Marion 9 each Asts: Penny Hardaway 8	Pts: Shaquille O'Neal 38; Rebs: Shaquille O'Neal 20; Asts: Kobe Bryant 6
LA Lakers lead series, 2–0

Staples Center, Los Angeles, California
Attendance: 18,997
Referees: Ted Bernhardt, Ron Garretson, Eddie F. Rush

TNT

May 12
10:30 PM

Boxscore

Los Angeles Lakers 105, Phoenix Suns 99
Scoring by quarter: 18–28, 34–22, 23–26, 30–23
Pts: Shaquille O'Neal 37; Rebs: Shaquille O'Neal 17; Asts: Horry, Shaw 4 each	Pts: Penny Hardaway 31; Rebs: Clifford Robinson 9 Asts: Jason Kidd 12
LA Lakers lead series, 3–0

America West Arena, Phoenix, Arizona
Attendance: 19,023
Referees: Jim Clark, Terry Durham, Hugh Evans

NBC

May 14
5:30 PM

Boxscore

Los Angeles Lakers 98, Phoenix Suns 117
Scoring by quarter: 24–38, 24–33, 23–22, 27–24
Pts: Shaquille O'Neal 24; Rebs: Horry, O'Neal 9 each Asts: Kobe Bryant 5	Pts: Clifford Robinson 32; Rebs: Jason Kidd 10; Asts: Jason Kidd 16
LA Lakers lead series, 3–1

America West Arena, Phoenix, Arizona
Attendance: 19,023
Referees: Joe Crawford, Gary Forest, Mike Mathis

TNT

May 16
10:30 PM

Boxscore

Phoenix Suns 65, Los Angeles Lakers 87
Scoring by quarter: 14–21, 9–28, 17–19, 25–19
Pts: Todd Day 10; Rebs: Rodney Rogers 8 Asts: Clifford Robinson 4	Pts: Kobe Bryant 17; Rebs: Shaquille O'Neal 21; Asts: Brian Shaw 4
LA Lakers win series, 4–1

Staples Center, Los Angeles, California
Attendance: 18,997
Referees: Dan Crawford, Bernie Fryer, Luis Grillo

- Kobe Bryant hits the game-winner with 2.6 seconds left in Game 2.

Regular-season series
Los Angeles won 4–0 in the regular-season series

November 15, 1999

Recap

Los Angeles Lakers 91, Phoenix Suns 82

America West Arena, Phoenix, Arizona

December 29, 1999

Recap

Phoenix Suns 87, Los Angeles Lakers 103

Staples Center, Los Angeles

March 24, 2000

Recap

Phoenix Suns 101, Los Angeles Lakers 109

Staples Center, Los Angeles

April 4, 2000

Recap

Los Angeles Lakers 84, Phoenix Suns 83

America West Arena, Phoenix, Arizona

This was the ninth playoff meeting between these two teams, with the Lakers winning six of the first eight meetings.

Previous playoff series
Los Angeles leads 6–2 in all-time playoff series

1970

Los Angeles Lakers 4, Phoenix Suns 3

1970 Western Division Semifinals

1980

Los Angeles Lakers 4, Phoenix Suns 1

1980 Western Conference Semifinals

1982

Los Angeles Lakers 4, Phoenix Suns 0

1982 Western Conference Semifinals

1984

Los Angeles Lakers 4, Phoenix Suns 2

1984 Western Conference Finals

1985

Los Angeles Lakers 3, Phoenix Suns 0

1985 Western Conference First Round

1989

Los Angeles Lakers 4, Phoenix Suns 0

1989 Western Conference Finals

1990

Los Angeles Lakers 1, Phoenix Suns 4

1990 Western Conference Semifinals

1993

Los Angeles Lakers 2, Phoenix Suns 3

1993 Western Conference First Round

==== (2) Utah Jazz vs. (3) Portland Trail Blazers ====
NBC

May 7
3:00 PM

Boxscore

Utah Jazz 75, Portland Trail Blazers 94
Scoring by quarter: 15–23, 19–21, 27–21, 14–29
Pts: Karl Malone 22; Rebs: Malone, Polynice 8 each Asts: John Stockton 6	Pts: Scottie Pippen 20; Rebs: Arvydas Sabonis 14; Asts: Arvydas Sabonis 4
Portland leads series, 1–0

Rose Garden, Portland, Oregon
Attendance: 20,351
Referees: Mike Callahan, Dan Crawford, Ronnie Nunn

TNT

May 9
10:30 PM

Boxscore

Utah Jazz 85, Portland Trail Blazers 103
Scoring by quarter: 16–24, 19–32, 23–24, 27–23
Pts: Karl Malone 15; Rebs: Olden Polynice 6 Asts: John Stockton 6	Pts: Steve Smith 19; Rebs: Grant, Wallace 8 each Asts: three players 4 each
Portland leads series, 2–0

Rose Garden, Portland, Oregon
Attendance: 20,463
Referees: Dick Bavetta, Steve Javie, Greg Willard

TNT

May 11
8:00 PM

Boxscore

Portland Trail Blazers 103, Utah Jazz 84
Scoring by quarter: 30–23, 25–26, 20–21, 28–14
Pts: Arvydas Sabonis 22; Rebs: Arvydas Sabonis 8 Asts: Scottie Pippen 7	Pts: Karl Malone 28; Rebs: Karl Malone 11; Asts: John Stockton 12
Portland leads series, 3–0

Delta Center, Salt Lake City, Utah
Attendance: 19,911
Referees: Joe Crawford, Ken Mauer, Jack Nies

NBC

May 14
3:00 PM

Boxscore

Portland Trail Blazers 85, Utah Jazz 88
Scoring by quarter: 26–31, 23–23, 20–21, 16–13
Pts: Brian Grant 20; Rebs: Brian Grant 13; Asts: Pippen, Stoudamire 4 each	Pts: Karl Malone 27; Rebs: Olden Polynice 11; Asts: John Stockton 9
Portland leads series, 3–1

Delta Center, Salt Lake City, Utah
Attendance: 19,627
Referees: Joe DeRosa, Hugh Evans, Bernie Fryer

TNT

May 16
8:00 PM

Boxscore

Utah Jazz 79, Portland Trail Blazers 81
Scoring by quarter: 21–19, 20–14, 22–28, 16–20
Pts: Karl Malone 27; Rebs: Karl Malone 11; Asts: John Stockton 9	Pts: Scottie Pippen 23; Rebs: Pippen, Sabonis 9 each Asts: Scottie Pippen 8
Portland wins series, 4–1

Rose Garden, Portland, Oregon
Attendance: 20,043
Referees: Ted Bernhardt, Hue Hollins, Bennett Salvatore

- In Game 5, Scottie Pippen hits the series-winning 3 with 7.3 seconds left. Game 5 is Jeff Hornacek's final NBA game.

Regular-season series
Portland won 3–1 in the regular-season series

November 9, 1999

Recap

Portland Trail Blazers 87, Utah Jazz 92

Delta Center, Salt Lake City

January 27, 2000

Recap

Utah Jazz 75, Portland Trail Blazers 85

Rose Garden Arena, Portland, Oregon

February 27, 2000

Recap

Utah Jazz 92, Portland Trail Blazers 101

Rose Garden Arena, Portland, Oregon

April 10, 2000

Recap

Portland Trail Blazers 90, Utah Jazz 86

Delta Center, Salt Lake City

This was the sixth playoff meeting between these two teams, with the Trail Blazers winning three of the first five meetings.

Previous playoff series
Portland leads 3–2 in all-time playoff series

1988

Portland Trail Blazers 1, Utah Jazz 3

1988 Western Conference First Round

1991

Portland Trail Blazers 4, Utah Jazz 1

1991 Western Conference Semifinals

1992

Portland Trail Blazers 4, Utah Jazz 2

1992 Western Conference Finals

1996

Portland Trail Blazers 2, Utah Jazz 3

1996 Western Conference First Round

1999

Portland Trail Blazers 4, Utah Jazz 2

1999 Western Conference Semifinals

== Conference finals ==
=== Eastern Conference finals ===
==== (1) Indiana Pacers vs. (3) New York Knicks ====
TNT

May 23
8:30 PM

Boxscore

New York Knicks 88, Indiana Pacers 102
Scoring by quarter: 17–35, 31–17, 23–26, 17–24
Pts: Latrell Sprewell 22; Rebs: Camby, Ewing 8 each Asts: Allan Houston 4	Pts: Austin Croshere 22; Rebs: Dale Davis 16; Asts: Mark Jackson 13
Indiana leads series, 1–0

Conseco Fieldhouse, Indianapolis, Indiana
Attendance: 18,345
Referees: Joe Crawford, Hue Hollins, Ronnie Nunn

TNT

May 25
8:30 PM

Boxscore

New York Knicks 84, Indiana Pacers 88
Scoring by quarter: 22–22, 21–20, 23–19, 18–27
Pts: Larry Johnson 25; Rebs: Marcus Camby 11; Asts: Latrell Sprewell 6	Pts: Jalen Rose 24; Rebs: Dale Davis 16; Asts: Mark Jackson 5
Indiana leads series, 2–0

Conseco Fieldhouse, Indianapolis, Indiana
Attendance: 18,345
Referees: Terry Durham, Bernie Fryer, Ron Garretson

NBC

May 27
3:30 PM

Boxscore

Indiana Pacers 95, New York Knicks 98
Scoring by quarter: 19–24, 23–17, 22–30, 31–27
Pts: Jalen Rose 26; Rebs: Dale Davis 16; Asts: Jackson, Rose 6 each	Pts: Latrell Sprewell 32; Rebs: Latrell Sprewell 8 Asts: Charlie Ward 9
Indiana leads series, 2–1

Madison Square Garden, New York City, New York
Attendance: 19,763
Referees: Dan Crawford, Bob Delaney, Jack Nies

NBC

May 29
5:30 PM

Boxscore

Indiana Pacers 89, New York Knicks 91
Scoring by quarter: 19–33, 21–24, 25–16, 24–18
Pts: Reggie Miller 24; Rebs: Dale Davis 11; Asts: Mark Jackson 7	Pts: Larry Johnson 25; Rebs: Marcus Camby 8 Asts: Charlie Ward 7
Series tied, 2–2

Madison Square Garden, New York City, New York
Attendance: 19,763
Referees: Steve Javie, Mike Mathis, Eddie F. Rush

NBC

May 31
9:00 PM

Boxscore

New York Knicks 79, Indiana Pacers 88
Scoring by quarter: 32–17, 8–25, 15–21, 24–25
Pts: Allan Houston 25; Rebs: four players 7 each Asts: three players 1 each	Pts: Travis Best 24; Rebs: Derrick McKey 9 Asts: Mark Jackson 7
Indiana leads series, 3–2

Conseco Fieldhouse, Indianapolis, Indiana
Attendance: 18,345
Referees: Dick Bavetta, Hugh Evans, Ken Mauer

NBC

June 2
7:00 PM

Boxscore

Indiana Pacers 93, New York Knicks 80
Scoring by quarter: 30–25, 20–16, 12–21, 31–18
Pts: Reggie Miller 34; Rebs: Dale Davis 16; Asts: Best, Jackson 4 each	Pts: Latrell Sprewell 32; Rebs: Patrick Ewing 12; Asts: Charlie Ward 6
Indiana wins series, 4–2

Madison Square Garden, New York City, New York
Attendance: 19,763
Referees: Joe Crawford, Bennett Salvatore, Don Vaden

- In Game 6, Reggie Miller scores 17 points in the 4th quarter to help the Pacers reach the NBA Finals. It was also Patrick Ewing's last Knicks game before being dealt to the Seattle Supersonics during the off-season.

Regular-season series
Tied 2–2 in the regular-season series

December 25, 1999

Recap

New York Knicks 90, Indiana Pacers 101

Conseco Fieldhouse, Indianapolis

February 19, 2000

Recap

Indiana Pacers 73, New York Knicks 87

Madison Square Garden, New York City

March 21, 2000

Recap

New York Knicks 91, Indiana Pacers 95

Conseco Fieldhouse, Indianapolis

April 10, 2000

Recap

Indiana Pacers 81, New York Knicks 83

Madison Square Garden, New York City

This was the sixth playoff meeting between these two teams, with the Knicks winning three of the first five meetings.

Previous playoff series
New York leads 3–2 in all-time playoff series

1993

Indiana Pacers 1, New York Knicks 3

1993 Eastern Conference First Round

1994

Indiana Pacers 3, New York Knicks 4

1994 Eastern Conference Finals

1995

Indiana Pacers 4, New York Knicks 3

1995 Eastern Conference Semifinals

1998

Indiana Pacers 4, New York Knicks 1

1998 Eastern Conference Semifinals

1999

Indiana Pacers 2, New York Knicks 4

1999 Eastern Conference Finals

=== Western Conference finals ===
==== (1) Los Angeles Lakers vs. (3) Portland Trail Blazers ====
NBC

May 20
3:30 PM

Boxscore

Portland Trail Blazers 94, Los Angeles Lakers 109
Scoring by quarter: 26–26, 16–37, 30–22, 22–24
Pts: Scottie Pippen 19; Rebs: Scottie Pippen 11; Asts: Scottie Pippen 5	Pts: Shaquille O'Neal 41; Rebs: Shaquille O'Neal 11; Asts: Shaquille O'Neal 7
LA Lakers lead series, 1–0

Staples Center, Los Angeles, California
Attendance: 18,997
Referees: Bob Delaney, Ron Garretson, Mike Mathis

TNT

May 22
9:30 PM

Boxscore

Portland Trail Blazers 106, Los Angeles Lakers 77
Scoring by quarter: 22–23, 26–22, 28–8, 30–24
Pts: Rasheed Wallace 29; Rebs: Rasheed Wallace 12; Asts: Greg Anthony 4	Pts: Shaquille O'Neal 23; Rebs: Shaquille O'Neal 12; Asts: three players 4 each
Series tied, 1–1

Staples Center, Los Angeles, California
Attendance: 18,997
Referees: Steve Javie, Ken Mauer, Jack Nies

NBC

May 26
9:00 PM

Boxscore

Los Angeles Lakers 93, Portland Trail Blazers 91
Scoring by quarter: 22–30, 23–25, 27–16, 21–20
Pts: Shaquille O'Neal 26; Rebs: Shaquille O'Neal 12; Asts: Kobe Bryant 7	Pts: Stoudamire, Wallace 19 each Rebs: Scottie Pippen 9 Asts: Scottie Pippen 6
LA Lakers lead series, 2–1

Rose Garden, Portland, Oregon
Attendance: 20,135
Referees: Dick Bavetta, Hugh Evans, Eddie F. Rush

NBC

May 28
3:30 PM

Boxscore

Los Angeles Lakers 103, Portland Trail Blazers 91
Scoring by quarter: 16–26, 26–21, 34–19, 27–25
Pts: Shaquille O'Neal 25; Rebs: Shaquille O'Neal 11; Asts: Kobe Bryant 7	Pts: Rasheed Wallace 34; Rebs: Rasheed Wallace 13; Asts: Damon Stoudamire 5
LA Lakers lead series, 3–1

Rose Garden, Portland, Oregon
Attendance: 20,209
Referees: Hue Hollins, Bennett Salvatore, Don Vaden

NBC

May 30
9:00 PM

Boxscore

Portland Trail Blazers 96, Los Angeles Lakers 88
Scoring by quarter: 26–24, 27–21, 27–22, 16–21
Pts: Pippen, Wallace 22 each Rebs: Rasheed Wallace 10; Asts: Detlef Schrempf 6	Pts: Shaquille O'Neal 31; Rebs: Shaquille O'Neal 21; Asts: Robert Horry 5
LA Lakers lead series, 3–2

Staples Center, Los Angeles, California
Attendance: 18,997
Referees: Joe Crawford, Terry Durham, Ronnie Nunn

NBC

June 2
9:30 PM

Boxscore

Los Angeles Lakers 93, Portland Trail Blazers 103
Scoring by quarter: 15–26, 24–23, 24–22, 30–32
Pts: Kobe Bryant 33; Rebs: Shaquille O'Neal 11; Asts: Robert Horry 7	Pts: Steve Smith 26; Rebs: Arvydas Sabonis 11; Asts: Arvydas Sabonis 6
Series tied, 3–3

Rose Garden, Portland, Oregon
Attendance: 20,340
Referees: Dan Crawford, Bernie Fryer, Ron Garretson

NBC

June 4
7:30 PM

Boxscore

Portland Trail Blazers 84, Los Angeles Lakers 89
Scoring by quarter: 23–16, 19–23, 29–19, 13–31
Pts: Rasheed Wallace 30; Rebs: Scottie Pippen 10; Asts: three players 3 each	Pts: Kobe Bryant 25; Rebs: Kobe Bryant 11; Asts: Kobe Bryant 7
LA Lakers win series, 4–3

Staples Center, Los Angeles, California
Attendance: 18,997
Referees: Dick Bavetta, Hugh Evans, Steve Javie

- In Game 3, Arvydas Sabonis' potential game-tying shot was blocked by Kobe Bryant.
- In Game 7, the Lakers overcame a 16-point deficit (71–55) and sealed the victory with Kobe Bryant delivering an alley-oop to Shaquille O'Neal.

Regular-season series
Tied 2–2 in the regular-season series

November 6, 1999

Recap

Los Angeles Lakers 82, Portland Trail Blazers 97

Rose Garden Arena, Portland, Oregon

December 3, 1999

Recap

Portland Trail Blazers 80, Los Angeles Lakers 93

Staples Center, Los Angeles

January 22, 2000

Recap

Portland Trail Blazers 95, Los Angeles Lakers 91

Staples Center, Los Angeles

February 29, 2000

Recap

Los Angeles Lakers 90, Portland Trail Blazers 87

Rose Garden Arena, Portland, Oregon

This was the ninth playoff meeting between these two teams, with the Lakers winning six of the first eight meetings.

Previous playoff series
Los Angeles leads 6–2 in all-time playoff series

1977

Los Angeles Lakers 0, Portland Trail Blazers 4

1977 Western Conference Finals

1983

Los Angeles Lakers 4, Portland Trail Blazers 1

1983 Western Conference Semifinals

1985

Los Angeles Lakers 4, Portland Trail Blazers 1

1985 Western Conference Semifinals

1989

Los Angeles Lakers 3, Portland Trail Blazers 0

1989 Western Conference First Round

1991

Los Angeles Lakers 4, Portland Trail Blazers 2

1991 Western Conference Finals

1992

Los Angeles Lakers 1, Portland Trail Blazers 3

1992 Western Conference First Round

1997

Los Angeles Lakers 3, Portland Trail Blazers 1

1997 Western Conference First Round

1998

Los Angeles Lakers 3, Portland Trail Blazers 1

1998 Western Conference First Round

== NBA Finals: (W1) Los Angeles Lakers vs. (E1) Indiana Pacers ==
NBC

June 7
9:00 PM

Boxscore

Indiana Pacers 87, Los Angeles Lakers 104
Scoring by quarter: 18–33, 25–22, 28–22, 16–27
Pts: Mark Jackson 18; Rebs: Dale Davis 8 Asts: Mark Jackson 7	Pts: Shaquille O'Neal 43; Rebs: Shaquille O'Neal 19; Asts: Bryant, Harper 5 each
LA Lakers lead series, 1–0

Staples Center, Los Angeles, California
Attendance: 18,997
Referees: Dan Crawford, Terry Durham, Jack Nies

NBC

June 9
9:00 PM

Boxscore

Indiana Pacers 104, Los Angeles Lakers 111
Scoring by quarter: 28–28, 21–24, 20–21, 35–38
Pts: Jalen Rose 30; Rebs: Dale Davis 10; Asts: Mark Jackson 8	Pts: Shaquille O'Neal 40; Rebs: Shaquille O'Neal 24; Asts: Brian Shaw 7
LA Lakers lead series, 2–0

Staples Center, Los Angeles, California
Attendance: 18,997
Referees: Joe Crawford, Eddie F. Rush, Bennett Salvatore

NBC

June 11
7:30 PM

Boxscore

Los Angeles Lakers 91, Indiana Pacers 100
Scoring by quarter: 15–23, 27–30, 24–26, 25–21
Pts: Shaquille O'Neal 33; Rebs: Shaquille O'Neal 13; Asts: Derek Fisher 10	Pts: Reggie Miller 33; Rebs: Dale Davis 12; Asts: Mark Jackson 6
LA Lakers lead series, 2–1

Conseco Fieldhouse, Indianapolis, Indiana
Attendance: 18,345
Referees: Hugh Evans, Bernie Fryer, Ron Garretson

NBC

June 14
9:00 PM

Boxscore

Los Angeles Lakers 120, Indiana Pacers 118 (OT)
Scoring by quarter: 23–33, 28–21, 29–23, 24–27, Overtime: 16–14
Pts: Shaquille O'Neal 36; Rebs: Shaquille O'Neal 21; Asts: Kobe Bryant 5	Pts: Reggie Miller 35; Rebs: Dale Davis 8 Asts: Mark Jackson 7
LA Lakers lead series, 3–1

Conseco Fieldhouse, Indianapolis, Indiana
Attendance: 18,345
Referees: Dick Bavetta, Steve Javie, Ronnie Nunn

NBC

June 16
9:00 PM

Boxscore

Los Angeles Lakers 87, Indiana Pacers 120
Scoring by quarter: 28–39, 17–25, 22–22, 20–34
Pts: Shaquille O'Neal 35; Rebs: Shaquille O'Neal 11; Asts: Ron Harper 5	Pts: Jalen Rose 32; Rebs: Austin Croshere 9 Asts: Mark Jackson 7
LA Lakers lead series, 3–2

Conseco Fieldhouse, Indianapolis, Indiana
Attendance: 18,345
Referees: Dan Crawford, Jack Nies, Bennett Salvatore

NBC

June 19
9:00 PM

Boxscore

Indiana Pacers 111, Los Angeles Lakers 116
Scoring by quarter: 26–24, 30–29, 28–26, 27–37
Pts: Jalen Rose 29; Rebs: Dale Davis 14; Asts: Mark Jackson 11	Pts: Shaquille O'Neal 41; Rebs: Shaquille O'Neal 12; Asts: Ron Harper 9
LA Lakers win series, 4–2

Staples Center, Los Angeles, California
Attendance: 18,997
Referees: Joe Crawford, Hugh Evans, Ron Garretson

- In Game 4, Kobe Bryant came back from his injury from Game 2 and after his teammate, Shaquille O'Neal fouled out of the game in OT, he took over the game. He followed in a missed shot by Brian Shaw with 5.9 seconds left to give the Lakers a 3-point lead, and after a potential game-winning three by Reggie Miller bounced off the rim, the Lakers took a 3–1 series lead.
- Game 6 is Rik Smits final NBA game.

Regular-season series
Tied 1–1 in the regular-season series

January 14, 2000

Recap

Los Angeles Lakers 102, Indiana Pacers 111

Conseco Fieldhouse, Indianapolis

March 3, 2000

Recap

Indiana Pacers 92, Los Angeles Lakers 107

Staples Center, Los Angeles

This was the first playoff meeting between the Lakers and the Pacers.

== Statistical leaders ==
Category	Game high			Average			
Category	Player	Team	High	Player	Team	Avg.	GP
Points	Karl Malone	Utah Jazz	50	Shaquille O'Neal	Los Angeles Lakers	30.7	23
Rebounds	Shaquille O'Neal	Los Angeles Lakers	24	Shaquille O'Neal	Los Angeles Lakers	15.4	23
Assists	Jason Kidd	Phoenix Suns	16	John Stockton	Utah Jazz	10.3	10
Steals	Scottie Pippen; Gary Payton	Portland Trail Blazers; Seattle SuperSonics	6	Eddie Jones	Charlotte Hornets	2.5	4
Blocks	Alonzo Mourning	Miami Heat	9	Alonzo Mourning	Miami Heat	3.3	10
