= 2001–02 Philadelphia 76ers season =

NBA professional basketball team season

- Head coach: Larry Brown
- General manager: Billy King
- Owners: Comcast Spectacor
- Arena: First Union Center

Results
- Record: 43–39 (.524)
- Place: Division: 4th (Atlantic); Conference: 6th (Eastern)
- Playoff finish: First round (lost to Celtics 2–3)
- Stats at Basketball Reference

Local media
- Television: WPSG; Comcast SportsNet Philadelphia
- Radio: WIP

The 2001–02 Philadelphia 76ers season was the 53rd season for the Philadelphia 76ers in the National Basketball Association, and their 39th season in Philadelphia, Pennsylvania. The city of Philadelphia hosted the NBA All-Star weekend at the First Union Center this season. The 76ers were coming off of an NBA Finals defeat to the Los Angeles Lakers, in which they won Game 1, but lost the next four games in the 2001 NBA Finals.

== Season summary ==
=== Off-season ===
During the off-season, the team re-acquired forward 76ers forward Derrick Coleman from the Charlotte Hornets, and acquired Corie Blount and Vonteego Cummings from the Golden State Warriors in a three-team trade, acquired Matt Harpring from the Cleveland Cavaliers, and later on signed free agent Derrick McKey at mid-season.

=== Regular season ===
Despite the addition of Coleman and Harpring, the 76ers struggled losing their first five games of the regular season. Last season's Most Valuable Player Allen Iverson, Sixth Man Aaron McKie, and point guard Eric Snow were all sidelined due to injuries; Iverson was out with an elbow injury, while McKie had a shoulder injury, and Snow was out with a broken thumb. Also just four games into the season, center Matt Geiger retired. However, Iverson, McKie and Snow eventually returned as the team posted a seven-game winning streak after their bad start, but then posted a seven-game losing streak in December leading to a 8–14 start to the season. The 76ers played above .500 in winning percentage for the remainder of the season, holding a 25–24 record at the All-Star break, and climbed back into playoff position by finishing in fourth place in the Atlantic Division with a 43–39 record, and earning the sixth seed in the Eastern Conference.

Iverson averaged 31.4 points, 5.5 assists and 2.8 steals per game in 60 games, and was named to the All-NBA Second Team, while Coleman averaged 15.1 points and 8.8 rebounds per game, and McKie provided the team with 12.2 points and 3.7 assists per game in 48 games. In addition, Snow contributed 12.1 points, 6.6 assists and 1.6 steals per game in 61 games, while Harpring provided with 11.8 points and 7.1 rebounds per game, and Dikembe Mutombo averaged 11.5 points, 10.8 rebounds and 2.4 blocks per game, and was named to the All-NBA Third Team, and to the NBA All-Defensive Second Team. Meanwhile, rookie point guard Speedy Claxton contributed 7.2 points, 3.0 assists and 1.4 steals per game, Blount averaged 3.6 points and 5.1 rebounds per game, and McKey provided with 2.9 points and 3.1 rebounds per game.

During the NBA All-Star weekend at the First Union Center in Philadelphia, Iverson and Mutombo were both selected for the 2002 NBA All-Star Game, as members of the Eastern Conference All-Star team; it was Mutombo's final All-Star appearance. Iverson also wore number #6 to honor Hall of Famer, and 76ers legend Julius Erving. Iverson finished in ninth place in Most Valuable Player voting, while Mutombo finished tied in third place in Defensive Player of the Year voting.

The 76ers finished third in the NBA in home-game attendance, with an attendance of 842,976 at the First Union Center during the regular season.

=== NBA playoffs ===
In the Eastern Conference First Round of the 2002 NBA playoffs, the 76ers faced off against the 3rd–seeded Boston Celtics, who were led by the trio of All-Star guard Paul Pierce, All-Star forward Antoine Walker, and Kenny Anderson. The 76ers lost the first two games to the Celtics on the road at the FleetCenter, but managed to win the next two games at home, which included a Game 4 win over the Celtics at the First Union Center, 83–81 to tie the series at 2–2. However, the 76ers lost Game 5 to the Celtics at the FleetCenter, 120–87, thus losing in a hard-fought five-game series.

=== Aftermath ===
Following the season, Mutombo was traded to the New Jersey Nets, while Harpring signed as a free agent with the Utah Jazz. Meanwhile, Claxton was traded to the San Antonio Spurs on draft day, Blount and Cummings were both released to free agency, and McKey retired.

== Offseason ==
During the offseason, the 76ers made multiple trades. On August 3, the organization traded Tyrone Hill to the Cleveland Cavaliers (where he had previously played four seasons) for Matt Harpring, Cedric Henderson, and Robert Traylor. On the same day, the 76ers would trade Roshown McLeod and a 2003 1st round draft pick to the Boston Celtics for Jérôme Moïso. Harpring would be Philadelphia's starting small forward for the season, while Henderson, Traylor, and Moïso would be traded before the season started.

On October 2, the 76ers signed Ira Bowman. Bowman would play 3 games before being waived on November 6.

On October 25, the 76ers were involved in a three-team trade with the Golden State Warriors and the Charlotte Hornets. The 76ers traded Cedric Henderson and a 2005 1st round draft pick to the Warriors. They also traded George Lynch, Jérôme Moïso, and Robert Traylor to the Hornets. The 76ers received Derrick Coleman from the Hornets and Corie Blount and Vonteego Cummings from the Warriors.

=== Draft picks ===
Round	Pick	Player	Position	Nationality	College
1	26	Samuel Dalembert	C	Canada	Seton Hall
2	36	Damone Brown	SF	United States	Syracuse
2	56	Alvin Jones	C	Luxembourg	Georgia Tech

== Roster ==
2001–02 Philadelphia 76ers roster
Players

Pos.	No.	Player	Height	Weight	DOB	From
SG	11	Raja Bell	6 ft 5 in (1.96 m)	204 lb (93 kg)	1976–09–19	FIU
PF	40	Corie Blount	6 ft 9 in (2.06 m)	240 lb (109 kg)	1969–01–04	Cincinnati
SF	25	Damone Brown	6 ft 9 in (2.06 m)	200 lb (91 kg)	1979–06–28	Syracuse
PG	12	Speedy Claxton	5 ft 11 in (1.80 m)	166 lb (75 kg)	1978–05–08	Hofstra
PF	44	Derrick Coleman	6 ft 10 in (2.08 m)	230 lb (104 kg)	1967–06–21	Syracuse
PG	5	Vonteego Cummings	6 ft 3 in (1.91 m)	185 lb (84 kg)	1976–02–29	Pittsburgh
C	1	Samuel Dalembert	6 ft 11 in (2.11 m)	250 lb (113 kg)	1981–05–10	Seton Hall
C	52	Matt Geiger	7 ft 0 in (2.13 m)	243 lb (110 kg)	1969–09–10	Georgia Tech
SF	21	Matt Harpring	6 ft 7 in (2.01 m)	231 lb (105 kg)	1976–05–31	Georgia Tech
SG	3	Allen Iverson	6 ft 0 in (1.83 m)	165 lb (75 kg)	1975–06–07	Georgetown
C	0	Alvin Jones	6 ft 11 in (2.11 m)	265 lb (120 kg)	1978–09–09	Georgia Tech
SF	9	Derrick McKey	6 ft 9 in (2.06 m)	205 lb (93 kg)	1966–10–10	Alabama
SG	8	Aaron McKie	6 ft 5 in (1.96 m)	209 lb (95 kg)	1972–10–02	Temple
C	55	Dikembe Mutombo	7 ft 2 in (2.18 m)	245 lb (111 kg)	1966–06–25	Georgetown
C	41	Jabari Smith	6 ft 11 in (2.11 m)	250 lb (113 kg)	1977–02–12	LSU
PG	20	Eric Snow	6 ft 3 in (1.91 m)	190 lb (86 kg)	1973–04–24	Michigan State

Coaches
Head coach
- Larry Brown
Assistant(s)
- Randy Ayers
- Herb Brown
- Dave Hanners
- John Kuester

Legend
- (DP) Unsigned draft pick
- (FA) Free agent
- (S) Suspended
- Injured

Roster
Updated: January 14, 2002

== Regular season ==
=== Season standings ===
Atlantic Division	W	L	PCT	GB	Home	Road	Div
y-New Jersey Nets	52	30	.634	–	33–8	19–22	16–8
x-Boston Celtics	49	33	.598	3	27–14	22–19	17–7
x-Orlando Magic	44	38	.537	8	27–14	17–24	12–12
x-Philadelphia 76ers	43	39	.524	9	22–19	21–20	14–11
e-Washington Wizards	37	45	.451	15	22–19	15–26	12–13
e-Miami Heat	36	46	.439	16	18–23	18–23	10–14
e-New York Knicks	30	52	.366	22	19–22	11–30	4–20

#	Eastern Conference				
#	Team	W	L	PCT	GB
1	c-New Jersey Nets	52	30	.634	–
2	y-Detroit Pistons	50	32	.610	2
3	x-Boston Celtics	49	33	.598	3
4	x-Charlotte Hornets	44	38	.537	8
5	x-Orlando Magic	44	38	.537	8
6	x-Philadelphia 76ers	43	39	.524	9
7	x-Toronto Raptors	42	40	.512	10
8	x-Indiana Pacers	42	40	.512	10
9	e-Milwaukee Bucks	41	41	.500	11
10	e-Washington Wizards	37	45	.451	15
11	e-Miami Heat	36	46	.439	16
12	e-Atlanta Hawks	33	49	.402	19
13	e-New York Knicks	30	52	.366	22
14	e-Cleveland Cavaliers	29	53	.354	23
15	e-Chicago Bulls	21	61	.256	31

z - clinched division title
y - clinched division title
x - clinched playoff spot

== Playoffs ==
2002 playoff game log
First Round: 2–3 (home: 2–0; road: 0–3)

Game	Date	Team	Score	High points	High rebounds	High assists	Location Attendance	Series
1	April 21	@ Boston	L 82–92	Allen Iverson (20)	Dikembe Mutombo (11)	Eric Snow (5)	FleetCenter; 18,624	0–1
2	April 25	@ Boston	L 85–93	Allen Iverson (29)	Derrick Coleman (13)	Allen Iverson (7)	FleetCenter; 18,624	0–2
3	April 28	Boston	W 108–103	Allen Iverson (42)	Dikembe Mutombo (11)	Eric Snow (5)	First Union Center; 20,689	1–2
4	May 1	Boston	W 83–81	Allen Iverson (28)	Dikembe Mutombo (14)	Eric Snow (11)	First Union Center; 20,904	2–2
5	May 3	@ Boston	L 87–120	Allen Iverson (31)	Matt Harpring (8)	Iverson, McKie (4)	FleetCenter; 18,624	2–3

2002 schedule

== Player statistics ==
Legend
GP	Games played	GS	Games started	MPG	Minutes per game
FG%	Field-goal percentage	3P%	3-point field-goal percentage	FT%	Free-throw percentage
RPG	Rebounds per game	APG	Assists per game	SPG	Steals per game
BPG	Blocks per game	PPG	Points per game

=== Regular season ===
Player	GP	GS	MPG	FG%	3P%	FT%	RPG	APG	SPG	BPG	PPG
Raja Bell	74	12	12.0	.429	.273	.750	1.5	1.0	.3	.1	3.4
Corie Blount	72	21	19.8	.458	.000	.644	5.1	.6	.7	.4	3.6
Ira Bowman	3	0	9.7	.714	.000		.3	.3	.7	.0	3.3
Damone Brown	17	0	3.9	.381	.000	.875	.2	.1	.1	.1	1.4
Speedy Claxton	67	18	22.8	.400	.121	.838	2.4	3.0	1.4	.1	7.2
Derrick Coleman	58	58	35.9	.450	.337	.815	8.8	1.7	.7	.9	15.1
Vonteego Cummings	58	1	8.6	.417	.261	.750	.9	1.0	.3	.1	3.3
Samuel Dalembert	34	0	5.2	.440		.389	2.0	.1	.2	.4	1.5
Matt Geiger	4	0	9.0	.125		.500	1.5	.0	.0	.5	.8
Matt Harpring	81	81	31.4	.461	.304	.743	7.1	1.3	.9	.1	11.8
Allen Iverson	60	59	43.7	.398	.291	.812	4.5	5.5	2.8	.2	31.4
Tim James	9	0	4.6	.385		.333	.8	.1	.0	.1	1.3
Alvin Jones	23	2	5.5	.400		.500	1.6	.1	.1	.4	1.1
Derrick McKey	41	1	19.1	.426	.417	.714	3.1	1.1	1.0	.1	2.9
Aaron McKie	48	16	30.6	.449	.398	.787	4.0	3.7	1.2	.3	12.2
Dikembe Mutombo	80	80	36.3	.501		.764	10.8	1.0	.4	2.4	11.5
Michael Ruffin	15	0	11.3	.269		.250	3.4	.3	.3	.5	1.1
Jabari Smith^{†}	11	0	10.0	.476	.000	.750	1.3	.5	.4	.2	5.0
Eric Snow	61	61	36.5	.442	.111	.806	3.5	6.6	1.6	.1	12.1

=== Playoffs ===
Player	GP	GS	MPG	FG%	3P%	FT%	RPG	APG	SPG	BPG	PPG
Raja Bell	3	0	2.7	.333	.000		.3	.0	.0	.0	.7
Corie Blount	5	0	17.6	.250		.750	2.8	.4	.4	.4	1.4
Speedy Claxton	5	0	9.8	.333	.000	.667	.2	2.8	1.0	.0	2.4
Derrick Coleman	5	5	38.2	.524	.308	.800	9.2	2.0	.2	1.4	12.8
Vonteego Cummings	1	0	1.0				.0	.0	.0	.0	.0
Matt Harpring	5	5	23.8	.500		.778	5.2	1.4	1.0	.0	10.2
Allen Iverson	5	5	41.8	.381	.333	.810	3.6	4.2	2.6	.0	30.0
Alvin Jones	2	0	2.5				.5	.0	.0	.0	.0
Derrick McKey	4	0	10.0	.500			1.5	.3	.3	.5	2.0
Aaron McKie	5	0	29.2	.435	.375	.700	3.6	2.4	2.0	.0	10.6
Dikembe Mutombo	5	5	34.6	.452		.615	10.6	.6	.4	1.8	8.8
Eric Snow	5	5	34.2	.321	.167	.773	4.4	5.4	1.2	.0	10.8

- ^{†} Denotes player spent time with another team in the season. Stats reflect time with the 76ers only.

Player statistics citation:

== Awards and records ==
- Allen Iverson, All-NBA Second Team
- Dikembe Mutombo, All-NBA Third Team
- Dikembe Mutombo, NBA All-Defensive Second Team

== See also ==
- 2001-02 NBA season
