= Aaron McKie =

American basketball player and coach (born 1972)

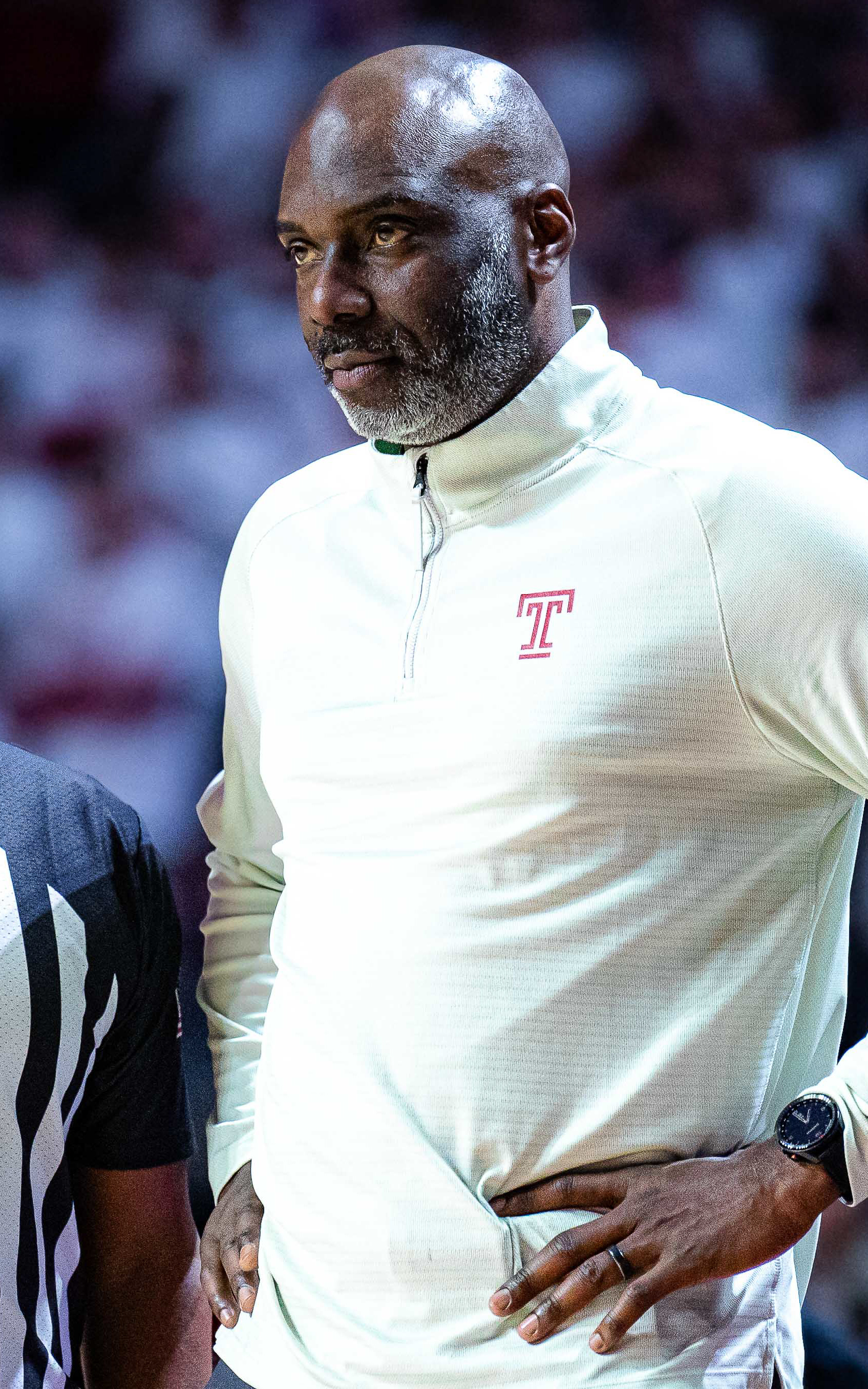
- McKie standing on the sidelines during a 2023 Temple basketball game

Temple Owls
- Title: Special advisor for athletics
- League: American Athletic Conference

Personal information
- Born: October 2, 1972 (age 54) Philadelphia, Pennsylvania, U.S.
- Listed height: 6 ft 5 in (1.96 m)
- Listed weight: 209 lb (95 kg)

Career information
- High school: Simon Gratz (Philadelphia, Pennsylvania)
- College: Temple (1991–1994)
- NBA draft: 1994: 1st round, 17th overall pick
- Drafted by: Portland Trail Blazers
- Playing career: 1994–2007
- Position: Guard / small forward
- Number: 23, 8, 2
- Coaching career: 2007–present

Career history

Playing
- 1994–1997: Portland Trail Blazers
- 1997: Detroit Pistons (Note: Mckie played in parts of two seasons in Detroit, but only during the 1997 calendar year. He was traded from Portland on January 24, 1997 during the 1996-97 season, and traded to Philadelphia on December 18, 1997 during the 1997-98 season.)
- 1997–2005: Philadelphia 76ers
- 2005–2007: Los Angeles Lakers

Career highlights
- NBA Sixth Man of the Year (2001); Atlantic 10 Player of the Year (1993); 2× First-team All-Atlantic 10 (1993, 1994); Third-team All-Atlantic 10 (1992); Robert V. Geasey Trophy (1993)

Career NBA statistics
- Points: 5,871 (7.4 ppg)
- Rebounds: 2,587 (3.3 rpg)
- Assists: 2,126 (2.7 apg)
- Stats at NBA.com
- Stats at Basketball Reference

Aaron Fitzgerald McKie (born October 2, 1972) is an American basketball coach and former professional basketball player who played 14 seasons in the National Basketball Association (NBA). He is currently the special advisor for athletics at his alma mater Temple University. From 2019 until 2023 he served as the head coach for the Temple men's basketball team. Selected by the Portland Trail Blazers 17th overall in the 1994 NBA draft, McKie spent time as a point guard, shooting guard or small forward throughout his professional playing career from 1994 to 2007.

== High school basketball career ==
McKie attended Philadelphia's Simon Gratz High School, where he was a letterman in basketball. He played on the same team as future NBA player Rasheed Wallace. As a senior, he was an All-Scholastic choice and an All-Southern Pennsylvania choice, and helped lead his team to the Public League championship and a 26–4 record, averaging 18.9 points, 9.9 rebounds and 7.2 assists per game. He graduated from Gratz in 1990.

== College career ==
After redshirting his freshman year, McKie finished his three-year career at Temple University tied for sixth on the school's all-time scoring list with 1,650 points, averaging 17.9 points per game while starting all 92 games. He teamed up with eventual All-Star Eddie Jones at Temple, and was named first-team All-Atlantic 10 and he was named to the A-10 all-tournament team as a senior. As a junior, he was the 1993 Atlantic 10 Conference Player of the Year, after averaging 20.6 points per game.

== NBA career ==
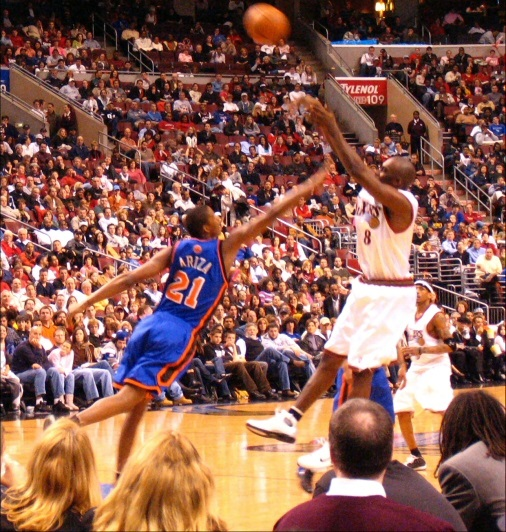
McKie shoots over Trevor Ariza in 2005

McKie was selected in the first round (17th overall) of the 1994 NBA draft by the Portland Trail Blazers. He has since played for the Detroit Pistons, the Philadelphia 76ers, and the Los Angeles Lakers. In the 2000–01 NBA season, McKie was named NBA Sixth Man of the Year, becoming the first Sixers player since Bobby Jones in 1983 to win that honor. McKie played an important role in the NBA Finals-bound team, serving as backup to Eric Snow and Allen Iverson and occasionally played as a starter. He notched consecutive triple doubles during the 2000-01 season, December 30, 2000, vs. the Sacramento Kings (19 points, 10 rebounds, 14 assists) and January 3, 2001, vs. the Atlanta Hawks (11 points, 10 rebounds, 10 assists).

On August 12, 2005, he was waived by the 76ers as part of the one-time "Amnesty provision" of the new labor agreement, allowing the 76ers to waive a player to avoid the luxury tax on his salary. McKie signed with the Lakers on August 22, 2005, and played 14 regular-season games for them.

In October 2007, McKie rejoined the 76ers as an assistant coach.

On February 1, 2008, McKie, who was a Sixers assistant coach at the time, was traded by the Lakers to the Memphis Grizzlies, along with Kwame Brown, Javaris Crittenton, rights to Marc Gasol, and the 2008 and 2010 first-round draft picks, for Pau Gasol. The Lakers' acquisition of Pau Gasol was only approved by the league office when the Lakers called McKie to inform him that they wanted to sign him and throw him in for salary cap reasons. He was released from the Grizzlies on May 9, 2008.

== Coaching career ==
=== Philadelphia 76ers (2007-2013) ===
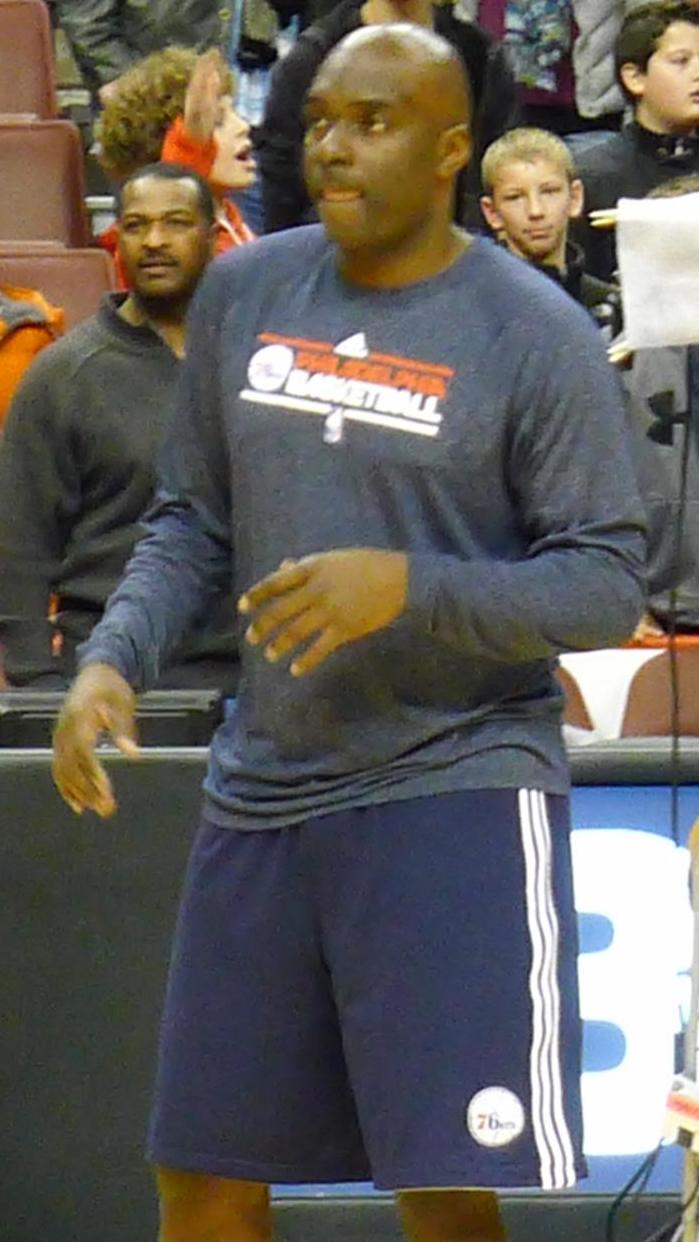
McKie with the 76ers in 2012

After being released by the Grizzlies, McKie rejoined the Philadelphia coaching staff as an assistant in September 2008. He remained in that position until 2013.

=== Temple Owls (2014-2023) ===
McKie left the Sixers staff to join the Temple men's basketball staff under Fran Dunphy. Temple University announced that he would replace Dunphy as the head coach of the men's basketball team starting with the 2019 season.

==== 2020-2021 ====
McKie's first two seasons coaching Temple were both limited due to the COVID-19 pandemic. In 2020, the AAC tournament and eventually the season was canceled. In 2021, almost all of out-of-conference play was canceled and the Owls only played 16 total games.

==== 2022 ====
McKie's first full season with the Owls came in the 2021-22 season. Temple went 17-12 and were seeded #4 in the 2022 AAC tournament and lost in the quarterfinals to Tulane.

==== 2023 ====
Entering the 2022-2023 season, Temple had high expectations with the return of multiple starters including guards Damian Dunn and Khalif Battle. However, the season was an up-and-down one for the Owls. The team started the season with a shocking loss to Wagner, but then defeated the #16 team in the nation, Villanova in their next game. The Owls won their first three games in the Big 5, but lost to Penn and only clinched a co-share of the Big 5. The highlight of the season came when Temple beat Houston the #1 team in the nation. However, the Owls struggled down the stretch and lost in the quarterfinals of the 2023 AAC tournament to Cincinnati.

On March 13, 2023, Temple announced that McKie stepped down as the men's basketball coach and would take on a new role as the special advisor to the athletics department.

== Career statistics ==
Legend
GP	Games played	GS	Games started	MPG	Minutes per game
FG%	Field goal percentage	3P%	3-point field goal percentage	FT%	Free throw percentage
RPG	Rebounds per game	APG	Assists per game	SPG	Steals per game
BPG	Blocks per game	PPG	Points per game	**Bold**	Career high
*	Led the league

=== Regular season ===
Year	Team	GP	GS	MPG	FG%	3P%	FT%	RPG	APG	SPG	BPG	PPG
1994–95	Portland	45	20	18.4	.444	.393	.685	2.9	2.0	0.8	**0.4**	6.5
1995–96	Portland	81	73	27.9	.467	.325	.764	3.8	2.5	1.1	0.3	10.7
1996–97	Portland	**41***	8	18.9	.340	.418	.837	2.3	2.0	0.8	**0.4**	4.1
1996–97	Detroit	**42***	3	20.2	.464	.375	.836	3.0	1.8	1.0	0.2	6.3
1997–98	Detroit	24	1	19.7	.413	.176	**.870**	2.8	1.6	1.0	0.0	4.5
1997–98	Philadelphia	57	31	23.5	.347	.196	.688	2.9	2.4	1.4	0.2	3.9
1998–99	Philadelphia	50*	4	19.2	.401	.194	.710	2.8	2.0	1.3	0.1	4.8
1999–00	Philadelphia	82	14	23.8	.411	.364	.829	3.0	2.9	1.3	0.2	8.0
2000–01	Philadelphia	76	33	**31.5**	.473	.312	.768	4.1	**5.0**	1.4	0.1	11.6
2001–02	Philadelphia	48	16	30.6	.449	.398	.787	4.0	3.7	1.2	0.3	**12.2**
2002–03	Philadelphia	80	40	29.7	.429	.330	.836	**4.4**	3.5	**1.6**	0.1	9.0
2003–04	Philadelphia	75	**41**	28.2	.459	**.436**	.757	3.4	2.6	1.1	0.3	9.2
2004–05	Philadelphia	68	3	16.4	.430	.323	.625	2.5	1.5	0.7	0.3	2.2
2005–06	L.A. Lakers	14	0	8.6	.250	.000	.500	1.4	0.8	0.4	0.0	0.5
2006–07	L.A. Lakers	10	0	13.1	**.647**	.000	.000	1.8	1.3	0.4	0.0	2.2
Career		793	287	24.2	.438	.350	.779	3.3	2.7	1.2	0.2	7.4

=== Playoffs ===
Year	Team	GP	GS	MPG	FG%	3P%	FT%	RPG	APG	SPG	BPG	PPG
1995	Portland	3	0	11.3	**.571**	.500	.000	0.7	0.3	1.0	0.0	5.7
1996	Portland	5	4	26.8	.367	.250	.778	3.6	1.8	1.2	**0.4**	6.2
1997	Detroit	5	0	19.4	.350	.200	.000	2.0	2.0	1.2	**0.4**	3.0
1999	Philadelphia	6	0	16.2	.304	.000	**.857**	2.5	1.8	0.7	0.0	3.3
2000	Philadelphia	10	6	33.1	.485	.343	.839	3.6	4.6	0.4	0.2	13.8
2001	Philadelphia	**23**	**16**	**38.8**	.415	.422	.787	**5.2**	**5.3**	1.5	0.1	**14.6**
2002	Philadelphia	5	0	29.2	.435	.375	.700	3.6	2.4	**2.0**	0.0	10.6
2003	Philadelphia	12	0	26.3	.535	**.556**	**.857**	3.6	1.8	0.8	0.2	7.8
2005	Philadelphia	5	0	17.0	.429	.333	.000	2.4	1.0	0.8	0.0	1.4
2006	L.A. Lakers	1	0	8.0	.000	.000	.000	0.0	0.0	0.0	0.0	0.0
Career		75	26	28.5	.437	.385	.801	3.6	3.2	1.1	0.1	9.5

== Head coaching record ==
=== College ===
Record table
Season	Team	Overall	Conference	Standing	Postseason
Temple Owls (American Athletic Conference) (2019–2023)
2019–20	Temple	14–17	6–12	10th	
2020–21	Temple	5–11	4–10	T–8th	
2021–22	Temple	17–12	10–7	4th	
2022–23	Temple	16–16	10–8	5th	
Temple:		52–56 (.481)	30–37 (.448)		
Total:		52–56 (.481)			
National champion Postseason invitational champion Conference regular season champion Conference regular season and conference tournament champion Division regular season champion Division regular season and conference tournament champion Conference tournament champion

== Personal life ==
He is a third cousin of Jason McKie of the NFL. Allen Iverson once said in an interview that Aaron McKie was his most influential teammate.
