= Eric Snow =

American basketball player and coach (born 1973)

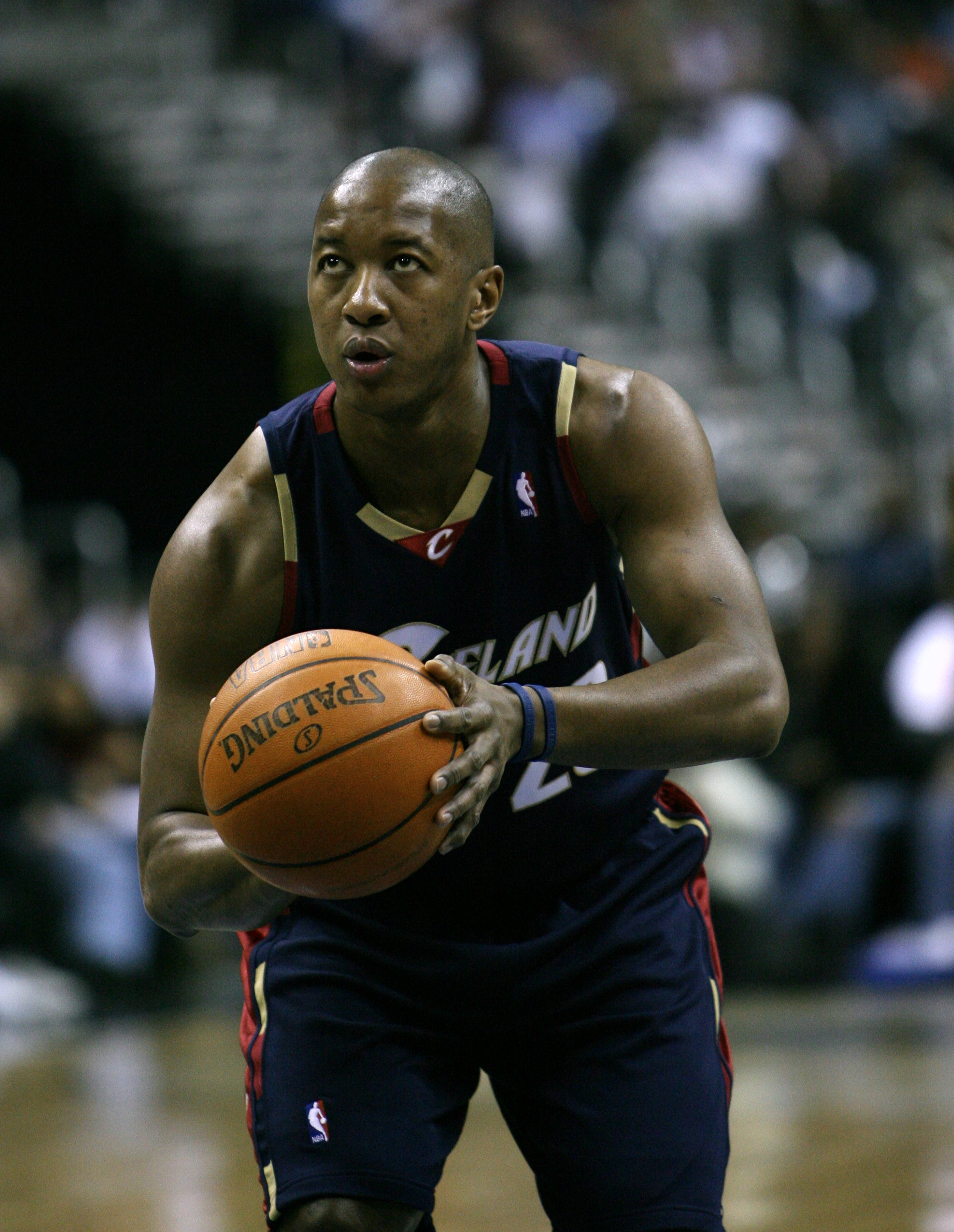
- Snow with the Cleveland Cavaliers in 2007

Personal information
- Born: April 24, 1973 (age 53) Canton, Ohio, U.S.
- Listed height: 6 ft 3 in (1.91 m)
- Listed weight: 208 lb (94 kg)

Career information
- High school: Canton McKinley (Canton, Ohio)
- College: Michigan State (1991–1995)
- NBA draft: 1995: 2nd round, 43rd overall pick
- Drafted by: Milwaukee Bucks
- Playing career: 1995–2009
- Position: Point guard
- Number: 3, 13, 20
- Coaching career: 2014–2021

Career history

Playing
- 1995–1998: Seattle SuperSonics
- 1998–2004: Philadelphia 76ers
- 2004–2009: Cleveland Cavaliers

Coaching
- 2012–2014: SMU (dir. of player development)
- 2014–2016: Florida Atlantic (assistant)
- 2017–2021: Texas Legends (assistant)

Career highlights
- NBA All-Defensive Second Team (2003)

Career NBA statistics
- Points: 5,791 (6.8 ppg)
- Assists: 4,245 (5.0 apg)
- Steals: 975 (1.2 spg)
- Stats at NBA.com
- Stats at Basketball Reference

Eric Snow (born April 24, 1973) is an American former basketball player and coach. He played the point guard position in the National Basketball Association from 1995 to 2008 and appeared in three NBA Finals. Known for his defense, Snow was named to the NBA All-Defensive Second Team in 2003. Following his playing career, Snow served as an assistant coach at Florida Atlantic for two years (2014–2016) after having worked two seasons at SMU (2012–14) as the director of player development under Larry Brown, his former coach.

== Early life ==
Snow was born on April 24, 1973, in Canton, Ohio. Snow began his basketball career at Canton McKinley High School in Canton, and played on the team from 1989 to 1991. In 1989–90, he averaged 18.9 points, 5.7 rebounds, five steals and 3.5 assists per game on a 24–2 team. He was McKinley High School's Most Valuable Player (MVP) for three straight seasons. The Associated Press selected Snow first-team boys Division I All-Ohio as a junior (1990) and senior (1991); and he was an honorable mention All-American as a senior. In Snow's junior year, the team reached the state final four in Ohio's championship tournament. Snow was known as "Mr. Clutch" in high school.

Snow graduated from McKinley with a 3.7 grade point average, and was a member of the National Honor Society.

== College career ==
Snow attended college at Michigan State University (MSU). He played varsity basketball at Michigan State under College Basketball Hall of Fame head coach Jud Heathcote. Snow led the team in assists and steals in the three seasons, from 1992-95. When he graduated, he was second on MSU's all-time assist list behind only Scott Skiles. His teams went to the NCAA Tournament in 1992, 1994 and 1995, reaching the second round in 1992 and 1994.

As a senior (1994-1995), Snow was the team's co-captain, and was named Big Ten Defensive Player of the Year, All-Big Ten Second Team and Team MVP. That year, MSU finished second in the Big Ten and was the number three seed in the Southeast Regional 1995 NCAA Tournament, but they were upset in the first round by Weber State University.

== Professional career ==
=== Seattle SuperSonics (1995–1998) ===
Snow was selected by the Milwaukee Bucks with the 43rd overall pick in the 1995 NBA draft, who immediately traded him to the Seattle SuperSonics for Eurelijus Žukauskas and a 1996 2nd round draft pick. Snow saw minimal minutes his first two seasons as the third string point guard behind Gary Payton and Nate McMillan. Seattle made the NBA Finals in his rookie season, losing to the Chicago Bulls.

On August 22, 1997, Snow re-signed with the SuperSonics; with Nate McMillan's impending retirement. Snow was assured he would have the backup point guard spot, but coach George Karl favored veterans, and did not trust Snow's game. The SuperSonics ended up signing Greg Anthony in October, just prior to the season, as the backup point guard; again pushing Snow to third on the depth chart at point guard.

=== Philadelphia 76ers (1998–2004) ===
Karl's refusal to play Snow at backup was the last straw for Snow. On January 18, 1998, Snow was acquired from Seattle by the Philadelphia 76ers in exchange for a 1998 second-round draft pick. At the time of the trade, Snow was averaging just 4.4 minutes per game; Sixers head coach Larry Brown gave him a bigger role in Philadelphia, averaging 18 minutes per game for the Sixers in 1997-1998, playing behind Allen Iverson and Brian Shaw. As a pass-first, defensive-minded point guard, Snow became a stalwart of the Brown-era 76ers teams. Snow's ability to guard opposing teams' shooting guards made him an ideal complement to Allen Iverson, a high-scoring but unusually small shooting guard. His teammates revered him for his defense and ball-handling.

In his first full season in Philadelphia (1998-99), he started every game of the lockout-shortened season (48), averaging 35.8 minutes per game. Snow helped the Sixers to their first winning month in five years by winning 8 of 13 games in February, on their way to making the playoffs for the first time in eight years with a 28–22 record, after starting the season 4–5. In the first round of the playoffs, the Sixers upset the 3rd–seeded Orlando Magic in four games, before falling to the Indiana Pacers in the second round.

In the 1999-2000 season, he started 80 games and averaged a career high 7.6 assists per game. The Sixers defeated the Charlotte Hornets in the first round of the playoffs, but lost 4–2 in the Eastern Conference semifinals to the Pacers, with Snow only able to start in two of the six games, and play only 55 total minutes in three games, because of a chipped bone in his ankle.

Despite missing thirty-two games early in the 2000–01 season due to a stress fracture in his ankle, Snow played a crucial role in helping the 76ers earn the top playoff seed in the Eastern Conference and ultimately reach the 2001 NBA Finals, where they lost in five games to the Los Angeles Lakers. In Game 4 of the Eastern Conference finals against the Bucks, Snow suffered a new fracture in his ankle, but he played in all seven games against the Bucks and in all five finals games against the Lakers.

After seeing the size of the fracture in an X-ray, Iverson was amazed that Snow could even play. During the following season, Lakers shooting guard Kobe Bryant stated that nobody in the league defended him better than Snow. He only played in 61 games in 2001-02, and the Sixers were eliminated in the first round of the playoffs, with Snow averaging over 34 minutes per game in playing all five games of that series.

In 2002–03, Snow was named to the NBA All-Defensive Second Team. He started all 82 games for the first time in his career. He posted career highs in points per game (12.9), rebounds per game (3.7), minutes per game (37.9), field goal percentage (45.2%), and free throw percentage (85.8%). Snow's excellent free throw percentage was particularly noteworthy, as he had been a very poor foul shooter in college and early in his NBA career, averaging 45.9% from the stripe during his four seasons at Michigan State (over 6% less than his field goal percentage) and 59.2% as a rookie. He also averaged 6.6 assists and 1.6 steals per game in 2002–03. The team was successful in the first round of the playoffs against the New Orleans Hornets, but lost in the second round again.

In his final season with the Sixers (2003-04), Snow again started all 82 games, averaging 36.2 minutes per game, 10.3 points per game, 6.9 assists, 1.2 steals, and 3.4 rebounds. The team finished 16 games under .500, with Allen Iverson only playing in 48 games.

=== Cleveland Cavaliers (2004–2009) ===
On July 20, 2004, Snow was traded to the Cavaliers in exchange for Kevin Ollie and Kedrick Brown. He was suspended without pay for a December 18, 2004, game against the Boston Celtics after a confrontation with Paul Silas the coach of the Cavaliers, when Silas took him out of the game. It was the only game that Snow missed in his first three years with the Cavaliers. He had a season-high 16 points on January 22, 2005, against the Golden State Warriors, and a season-high 13 assists on April 19, 2005, against the Boston Celtics (which is also his high assist total as a Cavalier).

Snow ranked fifth in the NBA in assist-to-turnover ratio (3.56); he donated $20 for every one of his steals and assists during the 2004–05 season. Ironically, it is possible the final straw in Silas being dismissed as the Cavaliers' coach in 2005, may have been his decision to substitute Snow into a game for guard Jeff McInnes.

Snow played in and started all 82 games for the Cavaliers in the 2005–06 season, helping the Cavaliers return to the playoffs for the first time since 1998. He was a team captain that season. He started all 13 playoff games for the Cavaliers. He scored 18 points in a Game 5 victory over the Washington Wizards during the first round of the playoffs before losing to the Detroit Pistons in 7 games in the semifinals.

In his 12th NBA season (2006-2007), Snow was named team co-captain, along with LeBron James. James expressed his respect for Snow's experience and leadership. For the fifth and final time in his career, Snow played in all 82 games. He had a season high 18 points on January 13, 2007, against the Los Angeles Clippers and a season-high 11 assists on January 20, 2007, against the Golden State Warriors. However, he gradually lost playing time through the course of the season to rookie guard Daniel Gibson, until he came off the bench on January 30, 2007, bringing an end to Snow's streak of starts that lasted for 127 games. Snow mentored Gibson, the man who replaced him, as he did Lebron James. The Cavaliers made the NBA Finals and lost to the San Antonio Spurs in a sweep that year.

In his final season (2007-2008), Snow only played in 22 games that season because of what was ultimately found to be a career-ending injury. On March 11, 2008, it was announced that Snow would miss four to six weeks due to arthritic-related symptoms in his left knee, ending his season. After the injury, Snow conceded that he likely would not play in the NBA again.

Unable to play, but still listed as an active player on the Cavaliers' roster, Snow served on Head Coach Mike Brown's staff as an unofficial assistant coach for the 2008–09 season.

== Legacy and honors ==
During his 13 year playing career, Snow reached the NBA Finals three times (and once with each of the teams on which he played): the SuperSonics in 1996, the 76ers in 2001, and the Cavaliers in 2007. All three appearances were losses. In Philadelphia and Cleveland, Snow served as team co-captain along Allen Iverson and LeBron James, respectively. He played in 846 games, starting 551. He averaged 6.8 points per game, and five assists, but Snow's value to his teams was based on intangibles like leadership, intelligence, sacrifice, and tough defense. In 2000, Larry Brown called Snow's defense, unselfishness, toughness, and having earned Iverson's "unbelievable respect" the key to the Sixers' season.

Snow has received numerous awards reflecting respect for his character. In 2005, the Professional Basketball Writers Association honored Snow with the J. Walter Kennedy Citizenship Award. He received the NBA Sportsmanship Award (now the Joe Dumars Trophy) for the 1999-2000 season, donating the $12,500 he received to his middle school, which renamed its courts the Eric Snow Recreational Area. He was the Atlantic Division winner of the 1998-99 NBA Sportsmanship Award, donating the $10,000 he received to Mckinley High. After his senior year at MSU (1995), Snow received team awards for scholarship and sportsmanship.

== Broadcasting ==
On April 4, 2009, Snow was given a "medically necessary" release and began working as an analyst for NBA TV, and later worked as a television broadcaster for Sixers games, from 2009 to 2012. Before becoming a broadcaster/analyst, Snow had attended a broadcast camp for NBA players at Syracuse University.

== Coaching career ==
Snow was hired as assistant coach for the Texas Legends of the NBA's G League in 2017 through NBA's Assistant Coaches Program (ACP). As of the 2020-2021 season, he was the Legends associate head coach, but was not on the staff the following season. Prior to joining the Legends, Snow served two years as an assistant coach for the Florida Atlantic University. Prior to that, Snow had been the director of player development for the Southern Methodist University from 2012–2014, under his former NBA coach, Larry Brown.

== Personal life ==
Snow is the younger brother of former linebacker Percy Snow, who also played at Michigan State University and played for both the Kansas City Chiefs and the Chicago Bears of the NFL. He married his college girlfriend, Deshawn in 1998, the two divorced in 2010. The couple have three sons: Jarren, Darius, and Eric Jr. With second wife Carrie he has sons Noah, Graceson and Brayden.

While still playing in the NBA, Snow operated the Shoot for the Moon Foundation basketball camp for children in Canton.

Snow wrote a book in 2010, “Leading High Performers: The Ultimate Guide to Being a Fast, Fluid and Flexible Leader”, with a foreword by former U.N. Ambassador Andrew Young.

In 2012, he donated $1 million to construct a YMCA in downtown Canton, which now bears his name.

His son Darius signed to play football with Michigan State and began his freshman year in 2020. He has been selected Academic All-Big Ten multiple times, but his playing on the football team has been limited by injuries.

== NBA career statistics ==
Legend
GP	Games played	GS	Games started	MPG	Minutes per game
FG%	Field goal percentage	3P%	3-point field goal percentage	FT%	Free throw percentage
RPG	Rebounds per game	APG	Assists per game	SPG	Steals per game
BPG	Blocks per game	PPG	Points per game	**Bold**	Career high
*	Led the league

=== Regular season ===
Year	Team	GP	GS	MPG	FG%	3P%	FT%	RPG	APG	SPG	BPG	PPG
1995–96	Seattle	43	1	9.0	.420	.200	.592	1.0	1.7	.6	.0	2.7
1996–97	Seattle	67	0	11.6	.451	.267	.712	1.0	2.4	.6	.0	3.0
1997–98	Seattle	17	0	4.4	.435	.000	.500	.2	.8	.0	.1	1.5
1997–98	Philadelphia	47	0	18.0	.429	.125	.721	1.6	3.5	1.3	.1	3.9
1998–99	Philadelphia	48	48	35.8	.428	.238	.733	3.4	6.3	**2.1**	.0	8.6
1999–00	Philadelphia	**82**	80	35.0	.430	.244	.712	3.2	**7.6**	1.7	.1	7.9
2000–01	Philadelphia	50	50	34.8	.418	.263	.792	3.3	7.4	1.5	.1	9.8
2001–02	Philadelphia	61	61	36.5	.442	.111	.806	3.5	6.6	1.6	**.2**	12.1
2002–03	Philadelphia	**82**	**82***	**37.9**	**.452**	.219	**.858**	**3.7**	6.6	1.6	.1	**12.9**
2003–04	Philadelphia	**82**	**82**	36.2	.413	.111	.797	3.4	6.9	1.2	.1	10.3
2004–05	Cleveland	81	15	22.8	.382	**.289**	.738	1.9	3.9	.8	**.2**	4.0
2005–06	Cleveland	**82***	**82***	28.7	.409	.100	.688	2.4	4.2	.9	**.2**	4.8
2006–07	Cleveland	**82***	45	23.5	.417	.000	.637	2.3	4.0	.7	**.2**	4.2
2007–08	Cleveland	22	5	13.9	.158	.000	.455	.9	1.9	.4	**.2**	1.0
Career		846	551	27.3	.424	.208	.763	2.5	5.0	1.1	.1	6.8

=== Playoffs ===
Year	Team	GP	GS	MPG	FG%	3P%	FT%	RPG	APG	SPG	BPG	PPG
1996	Seattle	10	0	2.4	.143	.000	.000	.4	.6	.2	.0	.2
1997	Seattle	8	0	6.0	.455	.500	.500	.3	1.5	.5	.0	1.6
1999	Philadelphia	8	8	**38.3**	.420	.231	.815	4.1	**7.1**	1.0	.1	**12.4**
2000	Philadelphia	5	4	27.6	**.484**	**.750**	**1.000**	2.0	7.0	.8	**.2**	7.4
2001	Philadelphia	**23**	9	31.2	.414	.000	.727	3.7	4.5	1.2	.1	9.3
2002	Philadelphia	5	5	34.2	.321	.167	.773	**4.4**	5.4	1.2	.0	10.8
2003	Philadelphia	12	12	34.6	.422	.100	.879	3.3	5.6	**1.5**	.0	11.5
2006	Cleveland	13	**13**	31.4	.421	.000	.759	3.3	2.8	.9	**.2**	6.6
2007	Cleveland	19	0	12.8	.316	.000	.571	1.5	1.5	.6	.1	1.7
Career		103	51	24.0	.404	.200	.782	2.6	3.6	.9	.1	6.6
