= Corie Blount =

American basketball player (born 1969)

Personal information
- Born: January 4, 1969 (age 57) Monrovia, California, U.S.
- Listed height: 6 ft 10 in (2.08 m)
- Listed weight: 242 lb (110 kg)

Career information
- High school: Monrovia (Monrovia, California)
- College: Santa Ana College (1989–1991); Cincinnati (1991–1993)
- NBA draft: 1993: 1st round, 25th overall pick
- Drafted by: Chicago Bulls
- Playing career: 1993–2004
- Position: Power forward / center
- Number: 44, 43, 40

Career history
- 1993–1995: Chicago Bulls
- 1995–1999: Los Angeles Lakers
- 1999: Cleveland Cavaliers
- 1999–2001: Phoenix Suns
- 2001: Golden State Warriors
- 2001–2002: Philadelphia 76ers
- 2002–2004: Chicago Bulls
- 2004: Toronto Raptors

Career NBA statistics
- Points: 2,287 (3.6 ppg)
- Rebounds: 2,690 (4.2 rpg)
- Assists: 460 (0.7 apg)
- Stats at NBA.com
- Stats at Basketball Reference

Corie Kasoun Blount (born January 4, 1969) is an American former professional basketball player born in Monrovia, California. He played eleven seasons in the National Basketball Association (NBA).

== Career ==
A 6'9" power forward/center, Blount starred at the University of Cincinnati during the early 1990s, where he helped his team reach the Final Four in 1992 and the Elite Eight in 1993. He was then selected by the Chicago Bulls with the 25th pick of the 1993 NBA draft, and he would spend 11 seasons in the league as a member of the Bulls (1993–1995; 2002–2004), the Los Angeles Lakers (1995–1999), the Cleveland Cavaliers (1999), the Phoenix Suns (1999–2001), the Golden State Warriors (2001), the Philadelphia 76ers (2001–2002), and the Toronto Raptors (2004).

Initially drafted for his athleticism, Blount developed a reliable midrange jumpshot over the course of his career, and he retired in 2004 with 2,287 career points and 2,690 career rebounds. He appeared as himself in the 1996 film Eddie.

== Drug conviction ==
Blount was arrested on December 5, 2008, for possession of 29 pounds of marijuana in the suburban Cincinnati, Ohio town of Hamilton. According to police reports, Blount received a package of 11 pounds of marijuana and transported it to another house that contained another 11 pounds of marijuana. Deputies also found another 7 pounds of marijuana and confiscated a 1996 Mercedes Benz, 2004 Cadillac Escalade, a 2000 Chevrolet Suburban, three guns and $29,500 in cash. Blount was charged with felony drug possession and was released on $10,090 bond.

On April 3, 2009, Blount pleaded guilty to two felony possession charges in a deal to avoid trafficking charges. He was sentenced May 13, 2009, to one year in prison. He was also fined $10,000 and ordered to surrender $34,000 in cash as well as two vehicles seized in the bust. He told the judge that it was all for personal use, prompting the judge to reply, "Cheech and Chong would have had a hard time smoking that much."

== NBA career statistics ==
Legend
GP	Games played	GS	Games started	MPG	Minutes per game
FG%	Field goal percentage	3P%	3-point field goal percentage	FT%	Free throw percentage
RPG	Rebounds per game	APG	Assists per game	SPG	Steals per game
BPG	Blocks per game	PPG	Points per game	**Bold**	Career high

=== Regular season ===
Year	Team	GP	GS	MPG	FG%	3P%	FT%	RPG	APG	SPG	BPG	PPG
1993–94	Chicago	67	8	10.3	.437	–	.613	2.9	.8	.3	.5	3.0
1994–95	Chicago	68	9	13.1	.476	.000	.567	3.5	.9	.4	.5	3.5
1995–96	L.A. Lakers	57	2	12.5	.473	.000	.568	3.0	.7	.4	**.6**	3.2
1996–97	L.A. Lakers	58	18	17.4	.514	**.333**	**.675**	4.8	.6	.4	.4	4.2
1997–98	L.A. Lakers	70	3	14.7	**.572**	.000	.500	4.3	.5	.4	.4	3.6
1998–99	L.A. Lakers	14	3	11.6	.394	.000	.500	3.3	.1	.1	.3	2.3
1998–99	Cleveland	20	0	18.4	.343	–	.524	5.3	.5	**.9**	**.6**	3.4
1999–00	Phoenix	38	0	11.7	.494	.000	.576	3.0	.3	.4	.2	2.8
2000–01	Phoenix	30	6	12.9	.489	–	.533	2.8	.3	.4	.2	1.8
2000–01	Golden State	38	0	**24.2**	.433	.250	.632	**8.3**	**1.3**	.8	.4	**6.8**
2001–02	Philadelphia	**72**	**21**	19.8	.458	.000	.644	5.1	.6	.7	.4	3.6
2002–03	Chicago	50	3	16.7	.485	–	.571	4.1	1.0	.7	.4	3.0
2003–04	Chicago	46	3	16.4	.471	.000	.542	4.5	1.0	.8	.4	4.5
2003–04	Toronto	16	0	18.3	.383	–	.667	4.3	.6	.7	.3	2.4
Career		644	77	15.4	.471	.115	.587	4.2	.7	.5	.4	3.6

=== Playoffs ===
Year	Team	GP	GS	MPG	FG%	3P%	FT%	RPG	APG	SPG	BPG	PPG
1994	Chicago	8	0	2.5	.000	.000	–	.6	.0	.0	.0	.0
1997	L.A. Lakers	3	0	2.7	**1.000**	–	.500	.7	.3	.0	.0	1.0
1998	L.A. Lakers	**12**	0	17.4	.500	–	.636	5.3	**.6**	.5	.3	2.6
2000	Phoenix	9	0	**18.0**	.548	–	.556	**6.2**	.3	**.7**	**.7**	**4.9**
2002	Philadelphia	5	0	17.6	.250	–	**.750**	2.8	.4	.4	.4	1.4
Career		37	0	13.2	.478	.000	.600	3.8	.4	.4	.3	2.3
