= Statue of Kobe Bryant =

Sculpture in Los Angeles, California, U.S.

- The Black Mamba Statue
- The statue in 2024
- Medium: Bronze sculpture
- Subject: Kobe Bryant
- Location: Los Angeles, California, U.S.; 34°2′37.3″N 118°15′57.6″W

The Kobe Bean Bryant Memorial Statue, is a work of public art by American artist and sculptor Julie Rotblatt-Amrany. The 19-foot (5.8 m) bronze sculpture of the American basketball player Kobe Bryant was commissioned by Bryant's widow, Vanessa Bryant in her husband's honor, and stands on a plinth in front of the Crypto.com Arena located in downtown Los Angeles. The statue was unveiled in 2024. The sculpture is the first of the three memorials planned to stand outside the Lakers downtown arena.

== History ==
On February 8, 2024, The Los Angeles Lakers unveiled a 19-foot statue of deceased retired NBA player Kobe Bryant outside of the Crypto.com Arena. The statue, sculpted by Julie Rotblatt-Amrany, depicts Bryant's right index finger skyward pose after his famous career-high 81-point game on January 22, 2006, against the Toronto Raptors, with his name and scorer's report from that game etched into the statue, representing one of his most iconic games during his career. The back of the statue contains a quote from Bryant, stating,

Leave the game better than you found it. And when it comes time for you to leave, leave a legend.

— Kobe Bryant

Kobe Bryant had spent his entire career with the Los Angeles Lakers since being drafted in the 1996 NBA Draft by the Charlotte Hornets before being traded to the team after being selected 13th overall. Eventually, he led the Lakers to seven NBA Finals appearances, winning five championships, two NBA Finals MVPs, one NBA MVP, and won two Olympic Gold Medals for the United States men's national basketball team. Bryant also made 18x NBA All-Star appearances while also being the NBA's scoring champion two times, winning the Slam-Dunk Contest once, making the NBA's All-Defensive First Team nine times, and making the All-NBA First Team eleven times.

The statue honoring Kobe Bryant and his daughter Gianna Bryant received mixed reactions from fans shortly after its unveiling.

== Typo Corrections and Updates ==
After the statue's unveiling, fans outside of Crypto.com Arena began to spot multiple spelling errors on the sculpture. The errors included misspelling of Toronto Raptors guard José Calderón as "Jose Calderson", misspelling of Los Angeles Lakers guard Von Wafer as "Vom Wafer", and the word "decision" misspelled as "decicion" in the sentence, "Coach's decision". Bryant's facsimile signature also read, "Kobe 24" despite him wearing his white No. 8 Lakers uniform on the statue.

The Los Angeles Lakers on March 11, 2024, announced their plans to correct and fix spelling errors and formatting errors on the statue. By April 9, 2024, the errors were corrected, and the "Kobe 24" facsimile on the Bryant No. 8 statue updated to simply read "Kobe".

== Future plans ==
Future installations will include one additional statue, which will depict Bryant in his No. 24 jersey, representing the latter part of his illustrious career with the Los Angeles Lakers. On August 2, 2024, the Los Angeles Lakers unveiled the Statue of Kobe and Gianna Bryant, the second of the three planned statues, serving as a tribute to the two who both died in the helicopter crash in January 2020.

== See also ==
- 2024 in art
- Murals of Kobe Bryant
