= Statue of Kobe and Gianna Bryant =

Sculpture in Los Angeles, California, U.S.

- The statue in 2024
- Medium: Bronze sculpture
- Subject: Kobe Bryant and Gianna Bryant
- Location: Los Angeles, California, U.S.; 34°02′37.5″N 118°16′03.9″W

The Kobe and Gianna Bryant Memorial Statue is a work of public art designed by American visual artist Karon Davis and created by the Fine Art Studio of Rotblatt-Amrany. The bronze sculpture of the American basketball player Kobe Bryant and his daughter Gianna Bryant was commissioned by Vanessa Bryant, the wife of Kobe and mother of Gianna. It stands on a base located near Crypto.com Arena in downtown Los Angeles. The statue was unveiled in 2024.

== History ==
In a famous tragedy, Kobe Bryant and his 13-year-old daughter Gianna Bryant were killed in a helicopter crash in Calabasas, California, on January 26, 2020. The crash claimed the lives of all nine people on board, including Kobe and Gianna. The statue serves as a reminder of their legacy and the bond they shared.

On August 2, 2024, the Los Angeles Lakers unveiled a statue of Kobe and Gianna outside Crypto.com Arena. The statue, which was revealed during a private ceremony, depicts Kobe embracing Gianna while they sit on a bench, wrapped in angel wings. The statue contains a plaque with a quote from Kobe Bryant, stating,

Gianna is a beast. She's better than I was at her age. She's got it. Girls are amazing. I would have five more girls if I could. I'm a girl dad.

— Kobe Bryant

The memorial is located near the Los Angeles Kings Monument.

The date of the unveiling, 8/2/24, holds numerological significance as it represents Kobe's two NBA numbers (8 and 24) and Gigi's number 2, which she wore on the basketball court (Gigi was a nickname of Gianna). The statue captures a moment of affection between Kobe and Gigi, inspired by their interactions while sitting courtside at various NBA games in 2019.

== Future plans ==
The statue of Kobe and Gianna Bryant is the second of three planned memorials outside the Crypto.com Arena, being unveiled 5 months and 24 days after the Statue of Kobe Bryant.

== See also ==
- 2024 in art
- Murals of Kobe Bryant
