= Statue of Ryne Sandberg =

Outdoor sculpture in Chicago, Illinois, U.S.

- Sandberg with his statue in 2024
- Medium: Bronze sculpture
- Subject: Ryne Sandberg
- Location: Chicago, Illinois, U.S.; 41°56′53.9″N 87°39′24.5″W

The Ryne Sandberg ("Ryno") Statue is a work of public art by American sculptor Lou Cella and the Fine Art Studio of Rotblatt-Amrany. Located in Gallagher Way outside of Wrigley Field in Chicago, Illinois, the bronze sculpture depicts baseball Hall of Famer Ryne Sandberg in his Chicago Cubs uniform. The text on the base of the statue outlines Sandberg's achievements as a baseball player and includes the text from his Hall of Fame plaque.

The statue was unveiled on June 23, 2024, the 40th anniversary of "The Sandberg Game." In that game, televised nationally by NBC, Sandberg hit game-tying home runs in the 9th and 10th innings off St. Louis Cardinals closer Bruce Sutter. The Cubs eventually won, 12–11, in 11 innings. The game propelled Sandberg into national prominence, and he won the National League MVP that year after leading the Cubs to their first postseason berth in 39 years.

Sandberg played 15 of 16 major league seasons for the Cubs, winning nine Gold Glove Awards and seven Sliver Slugger Awards, leading the National League in home runs once, and appearing in 10 All-Star games. Sandberg was elected into the National Baseball Hall of Fame in 2005.

The statue is one of five depicting Cubs greats located in Gallagher Way. The other four are dedicated to Ron Santo, Ernie Banks, Billy Williams and Ferguson Jenkins.
