= Lou Cella =

American sculptor

- Education: Illinois State University; Fine Art Studio of Rotblatt-Amrany
- Occupation: Sculptor
- Known for: Bronze works of sportspeople
- Awards: United States Sports Academy's Sport Artist of the Year Award; 2018

Lou Cella is an American sculptor based in Chicago. He studied at Illinois State University and the Fine Art Studio of Rotblatt-Amrany before beginning a 30-year career in sculpture, particularly bronze works of sportspeople in Seattle.

Cella's works include four statues commissioned by the Seattle Mariners and displayed at T-Mobile Park. They depict Dave Niehaus (2011), Ken Griffey Jr. (2017), Edgar Martínez (2021), and Ichiro Suzuki (2026). He was also commissioned to create a statue of Don James in 2017 for the Washington Huskies football program. His fifth major work in Seattle, a statue of former Seattle SuperSonics player and coach Lenny Wilkens, was unveiled in 2025 at Climate Pledge Arena, the site of the former Sonics home arena.

In 2018, Cella received the United States Sports Academy's Sport Artist of the Year Award for sculpture.
