= Los Angeles Kings Monument =

Monument in Los Angeles, California, U.S.

- The monument in 2022
- Artist: Itamar Amrany; Julie Rotblatt Amrany; Omri Amrany
- Completion date: November 26, 2016
- Location: Los Angeles, California, U.S.; 34°2′37.8″N 118°16′4.1″W

The Los Angeles Kings Monument (also known as the 50th Anniversary Monument and the LA Kings Monument) is a monument by artists Itamar Amrany, Julie Rotblatt Amrany, and Omri Amrany, installed outside Crypto.com Arena in Los Angeles. It is located near the statue of Kobe and Gianna Bryant.

Unveiled in 2016, the monument is 12 feet tall and 30 feet wide. Made of bronze, granite and glass, the monument features six bronze sculptures. The monument is located on Chick Hearn Court by Georgia Street.

From left to right, the monument depicts the following athletes:

- Jonathan Quick
- Drew Doughty imprinted on the wall
- Marcel Dionne
- Dave Taylor
- Rob Blake
- Anze Kopitar
- Dustin Brown hoisting the Stanley Cup
