= John Altobelli =

American baseball coach (1963–2020)

Biographical details
- Born: May 8, 1963; Chicago, Illinois, U.S.
- Died: January 26, 2020 (aged 56); Calabasas, California, U.S.

Playing career

College and Minor League Baseball
- 1982–1983: Golden West
- 1984–1985: Houston
- 1985: Miami Marlins (Florida State League)
- Position: Outfielder

Coaching career (HC unless noted)
- 1987: Houston (asst.)
- 1988–1992: UC Irvine (asst.)
- 1993–2019: Orange Coast

Head coaching record
- Overall: 705–478–4 (.596)

Accomplishments and honors

Championships
- 4× CCCAA (2009, 2014, 2015, 2019)

Awards
- 2× CCCAA Coach of the Year (2009, 2014)

John Edward Altobelli (May 8, 1963 – January 26, 2020) was an American college baseball coach who worked for 27 seasons at Orange Coast College in Costa Mesa, California. During his career, Altobelli led the Pirates to four California state junior college titles and was named National Coach of the Year by the American Baseball Coaches Association in 2019. In January 2020, he, along with his wife Keri and daughter Alyssa, died in a helicopter crash in Calabasas, California, which also killed basketball player Kobe Bryant.

== Early life and education ==
Altobelli was born in Chicago, Illinois, on May 8, 1963. He was the sixth of seven children. His father, Jim, was a professional baseball player.

Altobelli graduated from Newport Harbor High School in Newport Beach, California. He enrolled at Golden West College, where he played college baseball for the Golden West Rustlers as an outfielder. Altobelli transferred to the University of Houston, where he finished his college baseball career with the Houston Cougars from 1984 to 1985 and was a captain on the baseball team. As a junior in 1984, Altobelli led the Cougars in runs batted in (34), runs scored (47), and triples (three). He shared leads in doubles (14) and stolen bases (eight). As a senior in 1985, Altobelli had a single-season record 57 walks and led the team in runs scored (68) and stolen bases (13).

After his senior season, Altobelli played briefly in the 1985 season for the Miami Marlins of the Florida State League, which at that time was an independent full-season Class A team. He returned to school after playing only 15 games. Altobelli graduated from the University of Houston with a bachelor's degree in physical education in 1987. In 1988, he earned his master's degree in education from Azusa Pacific University.

== Coaching career ==
Altobelli began his coaching career in 1986 as junior varsity coach at Newport Harbor High School. The following year, he returned to Houston as an assistant baseball coach. From 1988 to 1992, Altobelli was an assistant coach at UC Irvine under Mike Gerakos.

Two months after UC Irvine cut its baseball team for budgetary reasons, Altobelli became head coach at Orange Coast College in July 1992. Altobelli led the Orange Coast Pirates to state championships in 2009, 2014, 2015, and 2019. He won his 700th career game in 2019. Altobelli was named National Coach of the Year for the Pacific Association Division by the American Baseball Coaches Association in 2019. In 27 seasons as Orange Coast head coach, Altobelli had a cumulative 705–478–4 record.

For three summer seasons between 2012 and 2014, Altobelli served as head coach for the Brewster Whitecaps in the Cape Cod Baseball League. Among his players were Aaron Judge of the New York Yankees, Jeff McNeil of the New York Mets, and Ryon Healy of the Milwaukee Brewers.

== Personal life ==
Altobelli and his first wife, Barbara Jean WooSam, had a son, John James (J.J.). J.J. played college baseball for the Oregon Ducks before playing professionally for the Johnson City Cardinals, and later became a scout for the Boston Red Sox. Altobelli and his second wife, Keri L. Sanders, had two daughters, Alexis and Alyssa.

Altobelli underwent open heart surgery in December 2012.

== Death ==
Altobelli died on the morning January 26, 2020, when the helicopter he was traveling in crashed in Calabasas, California. All nine passengers on board were killed, including Altobelli's wife Keri, the Altobellis' 14-year-old daughter Alyssa, former professional basketball player Kobe Bryant, Bryant's 13-year-old daughter Gianna, Sarah Chester, her 13-year-old daughter Payton, Mamba Sports Academy assistant coach Christina Mauser, and helicopter pilot Ara Zobayan. Alyssa Altobelli, Gianna Bryant, and Payton Chester were teammates on the Mamba Sports Academy basketball team. The group was traveling to Mamba Sports Academy in Thousand Oaks for a basketball tournament when the helicopter crashed.

Altobelli and Bryant became friends through their daughters and had previously traveled to practices and games together. Altobelli invited Bryant to speak to his baseball team in 2018. Orange Coast College associate baseball coach Nate Johnson said of Altobelli, "He kind of gets overshadowed by Kobe a little bit, but he was his own Kobe of the junior college baseball world".

Like all of the other passengers, Altobelli's cause of death was blunt trauma.

=== Legacy ===
On January 26, 2022, on the second anniversary of the crash, the baseball stadium at Orange Coast College was renamed to John Altobelli Park.
