= Statue of Don James =

Statue in Seattle, Washington, U.S.

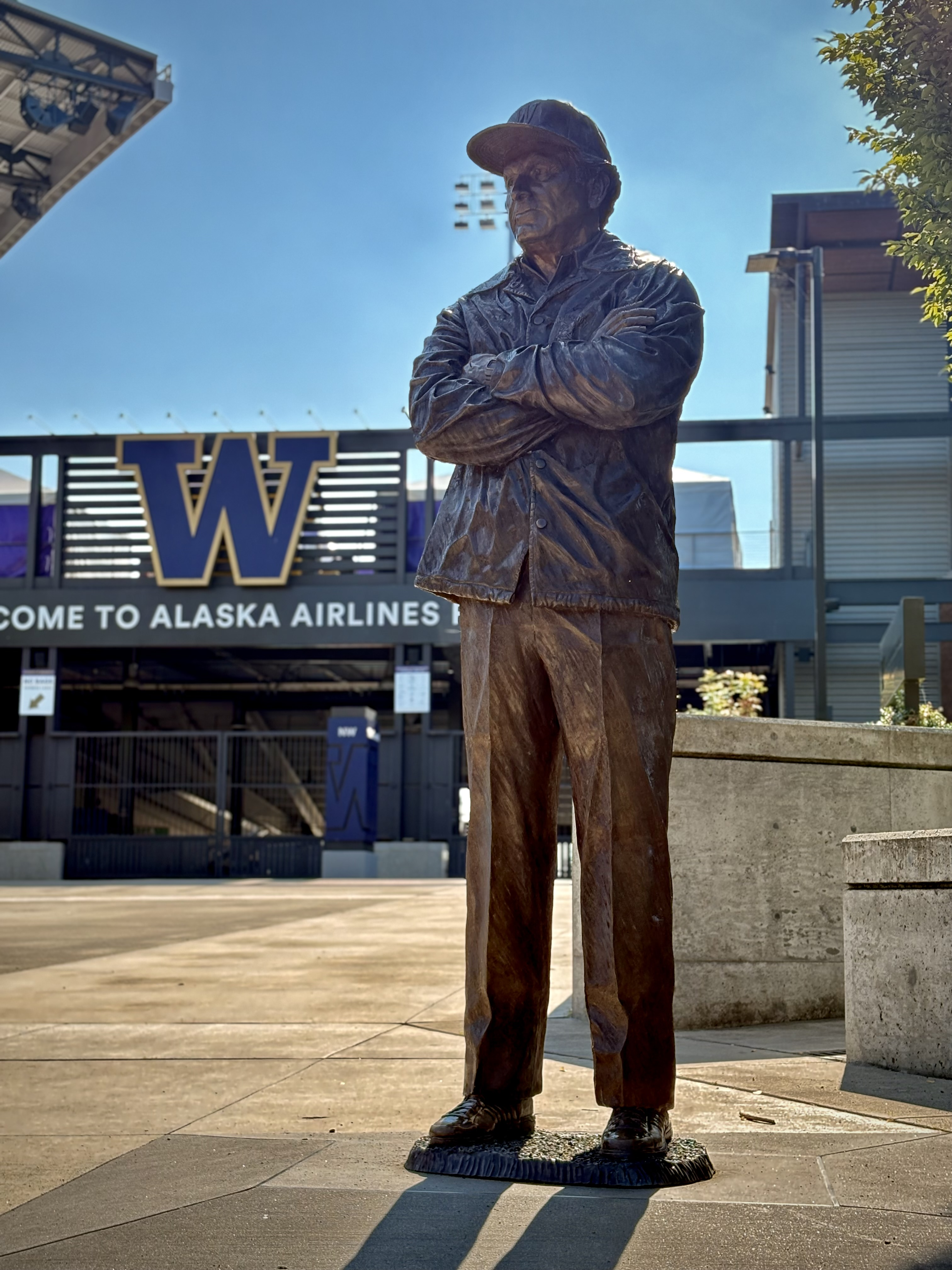
- Artist: Lou Cella
- Medium: Bronze sculpture
- Subject: Don James
- Location: Seattle, Washington, U.S.; 47°39′5.5″N 122°18′11.4″W

In 2017, the University of Washington unveiled a bronze sculpture of Don James by Lou Cella outside Husky Stadium, in Seattle, Washington, United States.
