= Julie Rotblatt Amrany =

American sculptor and painter

- Known for: Sculpture; Painting
- Website: www.rotblattamrany.com

Julie Rotblatt Amrany is an American sculptor and painter, whose work explores the resurgence of the figure in modern art.

== Early life and training ==
Rotblatt Amrany was born in Chicago, Illinois, and grew up in Highland Park, Illinois. She completed a B.A. in Art at the University of Colorado, Boulder, and spent her junior year abroad at the University of Bordeaux in France. Influenced by the works of Michelangelo, Rotblatt Amrany developed an artistic interest in the human figure at a time when figurative art had fallen out of favor in academia.

After college, Rotblatt Amrany trained at the Art Institute of Chicago in figure drawing, painting, and sculpting from life. After moving to the San Francisco Bay Area in 1982, she focused on figurative studies at the College of Marin. As part of her studies, Rotblatt Amrany dissected cadavers at the Indian Valley campus in a program intended for medical students. She also studied from the model under sculptor Manuel Neri at the University of California, Davis.

Rotblatt Amrany participated in several art projects in the Bay Area, including assisting with a mural for the Oakland Art Museum.

== Italy ==
Under Neri, Rotblatt Amrany developed an interest in carving marble. In 1985, she traveled to Perugia in Italy as part of a program offered by Boston University, drawing from life and experimenting with stone.

Rotblatt Amrany moved to Pietrasanta, the site of marble quarries that Michelangelo used for many of his sculptures. She began work at Studio Sem. There she created Transference in Time, which reflected her exploration of space and time and the nature of consciousness. Switching to Santoli's Studio, she spent several months on the creation of a large bas-relief on a one-ton block of rose-colored slate from Assisi. Titled "Holding the Source," the work was shipped to Northern California, where it was later destroyed in an earthquake.

== Personal life ==
While in Pietrasanta, Rotblatt Amrany met her future husband, Israeli artist Omri Amrany. The couple married in 1987 and lived for two years at the Kibbutz Ashdot Ya'akov Meuhadin in Northern Israel. Their son was born in Israel in 1989. That same year, the couple moved to Chicago.

== Career ==
In 1992, Rotblatt-Amrany and Amrany founded the Fine Art Studio of Rotblatt-Amrany, an attempt to establish in the United States the type of facility they had encountered in Italy. Conceived as both an educational center and a workplace, the studio also took on commissions. One of the defining projects of their career was the commission for the bronze statue of basketball player Michael Jordan at Chicago's United Center. For this work, they received an Award of Excellence from the Chicago Bar Association.

Whilst working on the Jordan sculpture, Rotblatt Amrany was diagnosed with breast cancer. As a result of her illness, she created Healing Energy for the Kellogg Cancer Care Center at NorthShore University HealthSystem in Evanston, Illinois, and Dancing Electrons for the Simmons Cancer Institute at Southern Illinois University in Springfield, Illinois.

Rotblatt Amrany took part in the Beaux-Arts Invitational Exhibition in Paris and the Shanghai Art Fair 2000. In 2001, she was invited to mount a one-woman exhibition at the Château d'Amboise in Amboise, France. Rotblatt Amrany's "Theatre of the Soul" exhibition comprised 30 sculptures and paintings.

In 2002, Rotblatt Amrany completed her largest project of the decade; Veterans Memorial Park (2002), a nine-acre site in Munster, Indiana. The project comprised six vignettes that included bronze sculptures, bas reliefs, laser-engraved images, and found object art.

Other works of the 2000s were:

- Quest for Exploration: James A. Lovell (2005), an installation about astronaut James A. Lovell at Chicago's Adler Planetarium
- Preservation of the Union (2006), a bas-relief for the Lincoln Presidential Library in Springfield, Illinois
- Chicago White Sox 2005 Championship Piece (2007), an bas-relief of bronze and granite outside U. S. Cellular Field in Chicago
- Chick Hearn (2010), a bronze figure of sportscaster Chick Hearn at Staples Center in Los Angeles
- Jackie Chan Tribute (2010), a bronze of actor Jackie Chan for the JC Group in Shanghai.

Rotblatt Amrany helped set up the Julia Foundation, a non-profit organization dedicated to establishing a sculpture garden in the Sheridan Reserve Center in Lake County, Illinois.

In the 2010s, Rotblatt Amrany continued to focus on figurative art, creating Jerry West (2011) for Staples Center in Los Angeles, and Scottie Pippen (2011) for Chicago's United Center. On her figurative public art, she said, "I believe we are giving something hopeful and energizing back, as we explore the lives of heroic figures and hold up parts of their human and soulful experience that can inspire others."

In 2014, the Rosalind Franklin University of Medicine and Science unveiled a bronze statue of Rosalind Franklin by Rotblatt Amrany, near its front entrance.

== Works ==
- The Spirit: Michael Jordan, sculpture
- Healing Energy (painting)
- Perestroika I and II, sculpture
- Quest for Exploration: James A. Lovell, installation
- Veterans Memorial Park in Munster, Indiana
- George Halas Memorial, epic bas-relief
- Chicago White Sox 2005 World Champions, epic bas-relief
- Preservation of the Union, epic bas-relief
- Statue of Kobe Bryant, Los Angeles, California, sculpture (2024)
- Statue of Mike Modano, sculpture
- Statue of Ryne Sandberg, sculpture
- Statue of Kobe and Gianna Bryant, Los Angeles, California, sculpture (2024)
