= Dear Basketball =

2017 film by Glen Keane

- Directed by: Glen Keane
- Written by: Kobe Bryant
- Produced by: Gennie Rim
- Narrated by: Kobe Bryant
- Music by: John Williams
- Production companies: Granity Studios; Believe Entertainment Group; Glen Keane Productions
- Release date: April 23, 2017 (Tribeca Film Festival)
- Running time: 5 minutes
- Country: United States

Dear Basketball is a 2017 American animated film written and narrated by Kobe Bryant and directed and animated by Glen Keane, with music by John Williams. It is based on a letter Bryant wrote for The Players' Tribune on November 29, 2015, announcing his retirement from basketball.

The film was distributed online through go90. It carries the same name as Bryant's retirement letter, and was made in partnership between Bryant's own Granity Studios and Believe Entertainment Group. It won the Academy Award for Best Animated Short Film at the 90th Academy Awards, the first Oscar win for any professional athlete, and the first Oscar win for Keane, a veteran Disney animator.

== Production ==
Keane experimented with new techniques, like animating sweat. He laid a separate sheet over the drawing where a soft layer of graphite was added. By taking pictures with his iPhone and turn it into a negative, where the white turned black and vice versa, so it looked like sweat was running down the face. An eraser was then used to create highlights and reveal the skin underneath.

== Plot ==
On the eve of his retirement from the National Basketball Association (NBA), Kobe Bryant describes his love for the game, which began when he was a child. The film starts with him making a dunk as the game clock is running out, winning the game for the Los Angeles Lakers. He then says "Dear Basketball", and goes on to reminisce about his childhood, rolling his father's tube socks and shooting imaginary game-winning shots in the Great Western Forum. He describes how his love for basketball inspired him to give everything from his "mind, body, spirit and soul". He explains that as 6-year-old boy, "I never saw the end of the tunnel / I only saw myself running out of one", and because of this, he always chose to play the game as well as he could: "And so I ran. I ran up and down every court / After every loose ball for you / You asked for my hustle / I gave you my heart / Because it came with so much more." He then says, "I played for the sweat and the hurt / Not because challenge called me / But because YOU called me", and by doing so he was able to achieve his Laker dream. He then explains how due to his Achilles heel injury from 2013, he has only one more NBA season left in him to dedicate to basketball: "My heart can take the pounding / My mind can handle the grind / But my body knows it's time to say goodbye." With a heavy heart, he comes to terms with this and accepts the fact that he is ready to let go of basketball. He then tells basketball that he wants to let it know now so they can make the best out of the little precious time they have left together: "We have given each other / All that we have." He ends the film by claiming "no matter what I do next / I'll always be that kid / With the rolled up socks / Garbage can in the corner / Five seconds on the clock / Ball in my hands". He continues to depict one of his iconic buzzer-beater shots with the game clock running down. His final words to basketball are: "Love you always, Kobe."

== Reception ==
=== Critical reception ===
As of June 2020, Dear Basketball holds a 71% approval rating on review aggregator website Rotten Tomatoes, based on 13 reviews with an average rating of 6.6 out of 10.

=== Accolades ===
Award	Date of ceremony	Category	Result	Ref.
Academy Awards	March 4, 2018	Best Animated Short Film	Won	
Annie Award	February 3, 2018	Best Animated Short Subject	Won	
Sports Emmy Award	May 9, 2018	Outstanding Post-Produced Graphic Design	Won	

Dear Basketball was included in The Animation Showcase world touring screening 2018.

It won the Best Traditional Animation and Special Jury Award at the 2017 World Animation Celebration International Film Festival held at Sony Pictures Animation. It was shown in Epcot at Walt Disney World in March 2017.
