= Granity Studios =

Media company

- Industry: Media
- Founded: 2013; 13 years ago
- Headquarters: Newport Beach, California
- Key people: Vanessa Bryant; CEO
- Products: Books, television, podcasts, films
- Website: granitystudios.com

Granity Studios is a multimedia original content company formed by former NBA player Kobe Bryant, focused on creating new ways to tell stories around sports. The company is headquartered in Newport Beach, California.

== History ==
Granity Studios was launched by Kobe Bryant in 2013 to make films, television shows, novels, and other forms of media.

In 2017, Granity Studios produced Dear Basketball, an animated short film based on Kobe Bryant's retirement poem in The Players' Tribune. It was directed and animated by Glen Keane with music by John Williams. At the 90th Academy Awards, Keane and Bryant won the Academy Award for Best Animated Short Film. Bryant became the first African-American to win the category and the first former professional athlete to be nominated and to win an Academy Award in any category. The film also won the Annie Award for Best Animated Short Subject and a Sports Emmy Award. It was also the first Oscar win for Keane, a veteran Disney animator.

Beginning in 2018, Bryant wrote, produced, and hosted the television series Detail, which aired for multiple seasons on ESPN and ESPN+. It featured his insights into the game of basketball and in-depth analyses of games and individual players.

On October 23, 2018, Bryant's book The Mamba Mentality: How I Play, with photographs and afterword by Andrew D. Bernstein, an introduction by Phil Jackson, and a foreword by Pau Gasol, was published by MCD / Farrar, Straus and Giroux. The book looks back on his career.

In the six months before his death in 2020, Bryant had been in talks with animator veterans Bruce W. Smith and Sergio Pablos about starting his own animation studio. At the time of his death, Bryant was working with Brazilian author Paulo Coelho on a children's book aimed at inspiring underprivileged children. After Bryant's death, Coelho deleted the draft, saying in an interview that "it didn't make any sense to publish without him." He did not say how many pages had been written or whether the book had a title.

Bryant also co-wrote or -produced several young adult novels through Granity Studios: The Wizenard Series: Training Camp, Legacy and the Queen, and Epoca: The Tree of Ecrof. A fourth novel, The Wizenard Series: Season One, was released posthumously in March 2020. The Wizarenard Series: Season One topped the New York Times middle-grade hardcover list.

Vanessa Bryant is the president and chief executive officer of Granity Studios.

== Films ==
Year	Title	Director	Notes	Ref
2015	Kobe Bryant's Muse	Gotham Chopra		
2017	Dear Basketball	Glen Keane	Winner of Best Animated Short Film at the 90th Academy Awards.	

== Television ==
Year	Title	Created & Written by	Notes
2017	Musecage	Kobe Bryant	Produced by Granity Studios for ESPN and ESPN+
2018	Detail	Kobe Bryant	Produced by Granity Studios for ESPN and ESPN+; 18 episodes as a host, 16 episodes as a writer for Bryant

== Books ==
Year	Title	Written By	Created By	Publisher	Notes
2018	The Mamba Mentality: How I Play	Kobe Bryant		Farrar, Straus and Giroux	Introduction by Phil Jackson, foreword by Pau Gasol & photos by Andrew D. Bernstein
2019	The Wizenard Series: Training Camp	Wesley King	Kobe Bryant	Granity Studios	
2019	Legacy and the Queen	Annie Matthews	Kobe Bryant	Granity Studios	
2019	Epoca: The Tree of Ecrof	Ivy Claire	Kobe Bryant	Granity Studios	
2020	Geese Are Never Swans	Eva Clark	Kobe Bryant	Granity Studios	
2020	Epoca: The River of Sand	Ivy Claire	Kobe Bryant	Granity Studios	
2020	The Wizenard Series: Season One	Wesley King	Kobe Bryant	Granity Studios	posthumously published after Bryant's death
2021	Legacy and the Double	Annie Matthew	Kobe Bryant	Granity Studios	posthumously published after Bryant's death

== Podcasts ==
Year	Title	Written By	Created By	Notes	Ref
2018–present	The Punies	Jon Haller	Kobe Bryant	2 Seasons	
