= Gianna Bryant =

Daughter of Kobe and Vanessa Bryant (2006–2020)

- Bryant in 2020
- Born: Gianna Maria-Onore Bryant; May 1, 2006; Orange County, California, U.S.
- Died: January 26, 2020 (aged 13); Calabasas, California, U.S.
- Resting place: Pacific View Memorial Park
- Other names: Gigi, Mambacita
- Parents: Kobe Bryant (father); Vanessa Bryant (mother)

Gianna Maria-Onore Bryant (May 1, 2006 – January 26, 2020), also known as Gigi Bryant and Mambacita, was an American student-athlete and the daughter of National Basketball Association (NBA) player Kobe Bryant and Vanessa Bryant. Raised in Newport Beach, California, Bryant was a competitive point guard who played for the Amateur Athletic Union (AAU) and Harbor Day School under the training and coaching of her father. A highly regarded prospect, she publicly aspired to play college basketball for the University of Connecticut Huskies and later play professionally in the Women's National Basketball Association (WNBA). She was widely recognized as the heir to her father's athletic legacy. Along with her father and seven others, Bryant died in a helicopter crash in January 2020 at the age of 13 while traveling to a youth basketball tournament at the Mamba Sports Academy.

In the wake of her death, Bryant became a prominent symbol for the advancement of girls' and women's sports. She was posthumously selected as an honorary draft pick in the 2020 WNBA draft, and the league subsequently established the Kobe & Gigi Bryant Advocacy Award in her memory. Her jersey number 2 was retired by Harbor Day School and honored by the University of Connecticut. Her legacy is preserved through the Mamba & Mambacita Sports Foundation, a global public mural movement, and collaborative athletic apparel lines designed to fund youth sports programs. In August 2024, a permanent bronze monument honoring Bryant and her father was unveiled outside the Crypto.com Arena in Los Angeles.

== Life ==
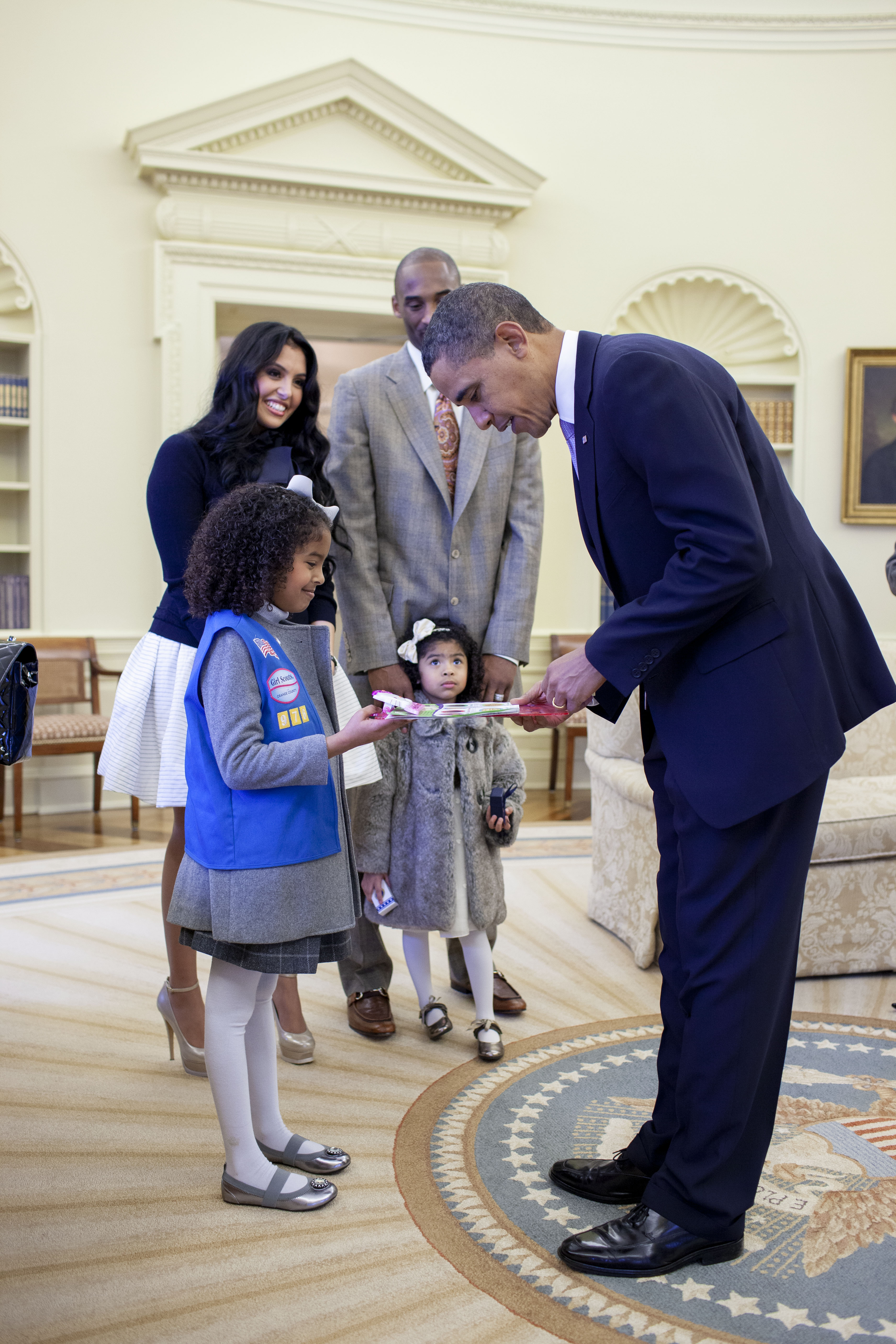
Gianna and her parents watch while her sister Natalia sells Girl Scout Cookies to President Barack Obama in the Oval Office, January 26, 2010, exactly a decade before her and her father's deaths

Gianna "Gigi" Bryant was born on May 1, 2006, the daughter of National Basketball Association Hall-of-Famer athlete Kobe Bryant and businesswoman, philanthropist and model Vanessa Bryant. She had an older sister, Natalia, and two younger sisters, Bianka and Capri. Bryant often accompanied her father, sitting with him at the 2008 NBA Finals press conference and playing on the court during warm-ups at the 2016 All-Star Game. The Hartford Courant reported, by 2018, when Bryant was only 11, that college basketball coaches were asking her father to encourage her to attend their colleges and join their teams.

Bryant attended Harbor Day School in Newport Beach, where she played on the school basketball team and was a member of the student council. Bryant also played basketball for the Amateur Athletic Union (AAU).

USA Today noted, in June 2018, that, having just turned 12, Bryant was already taller than her mother, and speculated that, by the time she was grown, Bryant might be close to the height of her father. They stated, "That size with Bryant's skill is an absolutely terrifying combination for a young dynamo who clearly has the ability to dominate the flow of a game on the court."

In December 2019, Gianna was captured in a video with her father talking intensely in the stands while watching a basketball game, the image of which was shared further after their deaths the following month. On December 30, 2019, Bryant's father Kobe made a trademark application for "Mambacita", her sports nickname (derived from his, "The Black Mamba") on her behalf.

== Death ==
Bryant, her father, and seven other people died on January 26, 2020, in a helicopter crash at Calabasas, California. The other victims included two of Gianna's basketball teammates: Alyssa Altobelli (daughter of baseball coach John Altobelli) and Payton Chester. A postmortem revealed that the cause of death for all nine people was blunt trauma and the manner of death was an accident.

== Tributes and funeral services ==
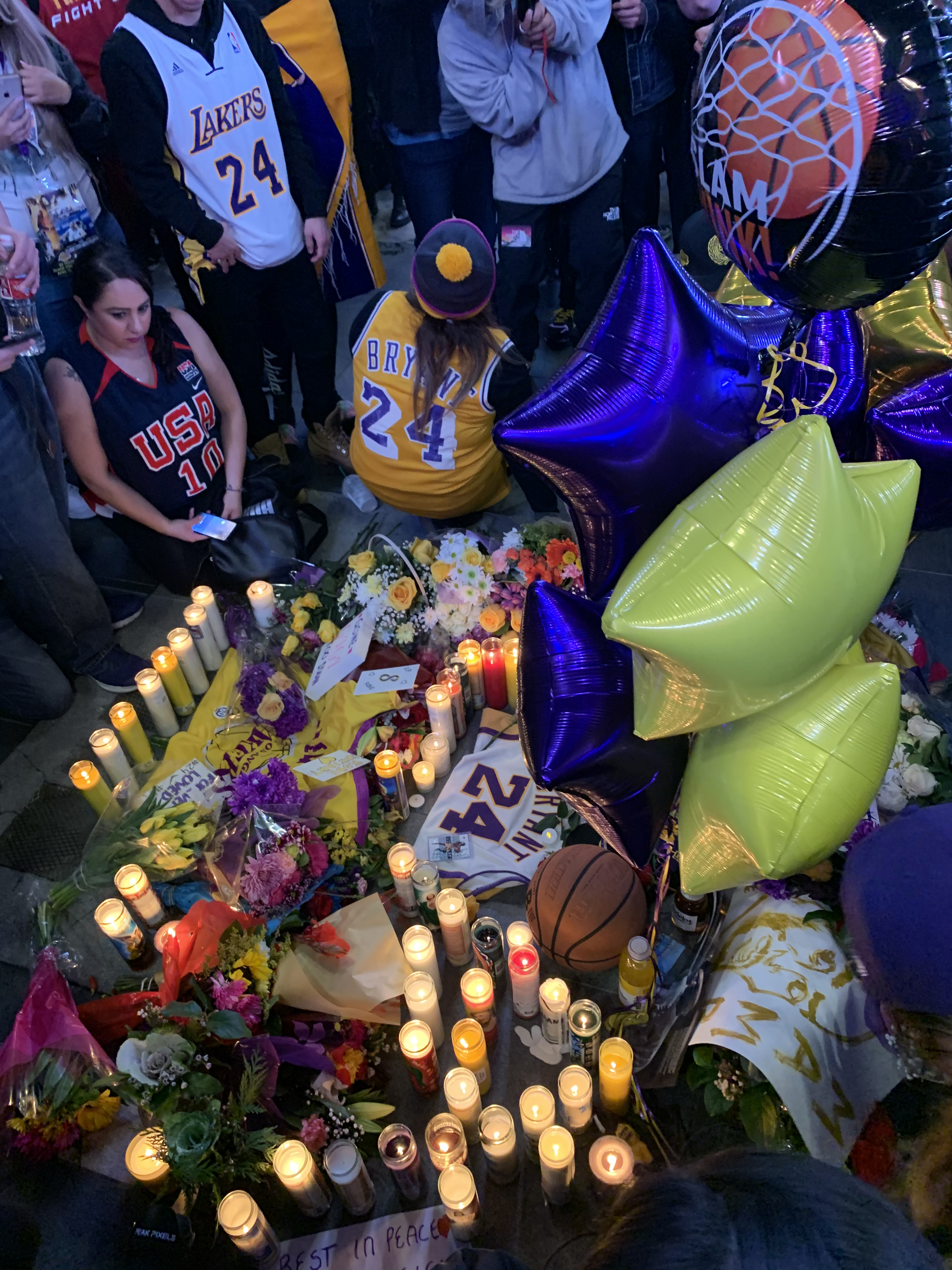
Fans gathered in front of Staples Center (later Crypto.com Arena) on the day of Bryant's death

On February 7, 2020, Bryant and her father were buried in a private funeral in Pacific View Memorial Park in the Corona del Mar neighborhood of Newport Beach, California. A public memorial service was held on February 24 (2/24, marking both Kobe's and Gianna's jersey numbers) at Staples Center with Jimmy Kimmel hosting. Speakers at the service included Vanessa, Jordan, and Shaquille O'Neal, along with Phoenix Mercury guard Diana Taurasi and Geno Auriemma, Taurasi's coach at Connecticut, where Bryant had been aspiring to play.

== Legacy ==
=== Basketball ===
In the 2020 WNBA draft, Bryant, Altobelli, and Chester were made honorary draft picks. WNBA commissioner Cathy Engelbert said, "These athletes represented the future of the WNBA. Players who were following their passions, acquiring knowledge of the game, exhibiting skills that were way beyond their years. They represented the next generation of stars in our league, maybe what might have been called the 'Mambacita Generation'." The NBA said, "Gianna Bryant was going to carry on a basketball legacy". Russ Davis, the women's basketball coach at Vanguard University in Southern California. "It's hard to predict her future, but with the way she was improving and the way she understood the game, she was going to have a bright one." Bryant's school, Harbor Day School, retired her jersey #2.

Bryant was expected to play for the University of Connecticut's UConn Huskies women's basketball; the team saved a seat for her at the game following her death, where they placed flowers and a UConn jersey bearing her No. 2 on the bench. UConn also posted to Twitter, "Mambacita is forever a Husky."

In 2022, the WNBA introduced an award named the Kobe & Gigi Advocacy Award: it is given out yearly to "honor someone in the basketball space for their continued advocacy for girls and women's basketball around the country."

On what would have been her 18th birthday in 2024, the Mamba & Mambacita Sports Foundation hosted a basketball camp called "Play Gigi's Way".

=== Brand name ===
On May 1, 2022, on what would have been Bryant's 16th birthday, Nike released the "Mambacita Sweet 16" shoe. It was black and white, meant to "symbolize[s] Gigi Bryant's impact on basketball and her goal to build a better, more inclusive future for the game," Nike said. In May 2024, Nike released a new colorway of the Nike Kobe 8 "Mambacita" sneaker in honor of what would have been Gianna's 18th birthday. Profits will benefit the Mambacita Sports Foundation, dedicated to supporting underserved child athletes. Nike added butterflies meant to show the "transformational impact she had on highlighting women's sports".

=== Artworks ===
Numerous murals were painted around Los Angeles, honoring Kobe and "Gigi" Bryant.

On the second anniversary of their death, January 26, 2022, a 160 lb (73 kg) bronze statue of Gianna and her father was placed for a day at the site of the crash. The sculptor, Dan Medina, said that he was working on a life-size version of the work and hoped to site it in downtown Los Angeles. In February 2024, when a Statue of Kobe Bryant was installed at his team's basketball court, Gianna's mother Vanessa Bryant said that two more statues were planned for that site including "one with our beautiful daughter Gianna".

A statue depicting her and her father embracing was unveiled on August 2, 2024, near Crypto.com Arena. The pose was inspired by various moments from 2019 of the two sitting courtside at numerous Los Angeles Lakers games and one Brooklyn Nets game.
