= Statue of Michael Jordan =

Public sculpture in Chicago

- The Spirit, Michael Jordan's Spirit
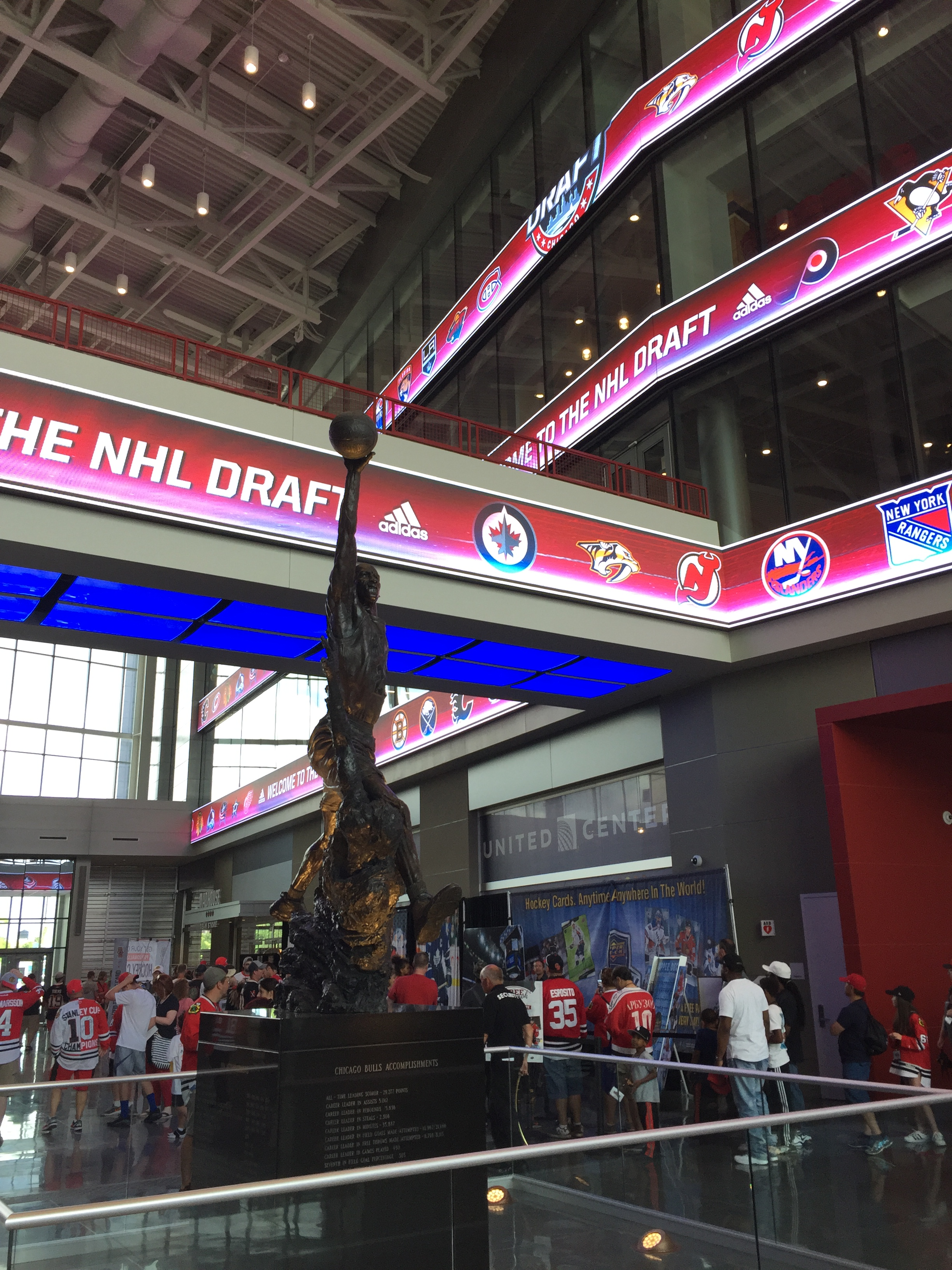
- The statue in the "atrium" in 2017
- Artist: Omri; Julie Rotblatt-Amrany
- Year: 1994
- Medium: Bronze sculpture; black granite (base)
- Dimensions: 3.7 m (12 ft)
- Location: Chicago, Illinois, U.S.; 41°52′51″N 87°40′23″W

The statue of Michael Jordan, also known as The Spirit (and sometimes referred to as Michael Jordan's Spirit), is a bronze sculpture by Omri Amrany and Julie Rotblatt-Amrany that is now located inside an extension of the United Center in the Near West Side community area of Chicago since March 1, 2017. Depicting Basketball Hall of Fame member and former Chicago Bulls player Michael Jordan and unveiled outside the United Center on November 1, 1994, the 12-foot (3.7 m) sculpture stands atop a 5-foot (1.52 m) black granite base. The sculpture was commissioned after Jordan's initial retirement following three consecutive NBA championships and unveiled outdoors prior to the Bulls taking residence in their then new home stadium. Although not critically well received, the statue has established its own legacy as a meeting place for fans at subsequent Bulls championships and as a rallying point for Chicago Blackhawks fans.

== History ==
=== Background ===
Michael Jordan had spent his entire career, except his last two seasons, with the Chicago Bulls since being drafted in the 1984 NBA draft by the team with the third overall selection. Eventually, he led the Bulls to three consecutive championships in the 1991, 1992 and 1993 NBA Finals. During each of these championship seasons, he was an NBA All-Star, NBA scoring champion, All-NBA Team first team selection, NBA All-Defensive Team first team selection, and the NBA Finals MVP.

After Jordan retired following the 1992–93 NBA season, Chicago Bulls owner Jerry Reinsdorf sought a sculptor to honor Jordan and requested that Chicago Bulls Vice President Steve Schanwald seek proposals from artists. Twelve artists made proposals. In January 1994, Schanwald hired Omri and Julie Rotblatt-Amrany of Highland Park, Illinois, who erected a statue at the Bulls' new home for the 1994–95 NBA season, the United Center. Until 1994 when they both moved, the Bulls and Blackhawks had played at Chicago Stadium.

=== Creation and installation ===
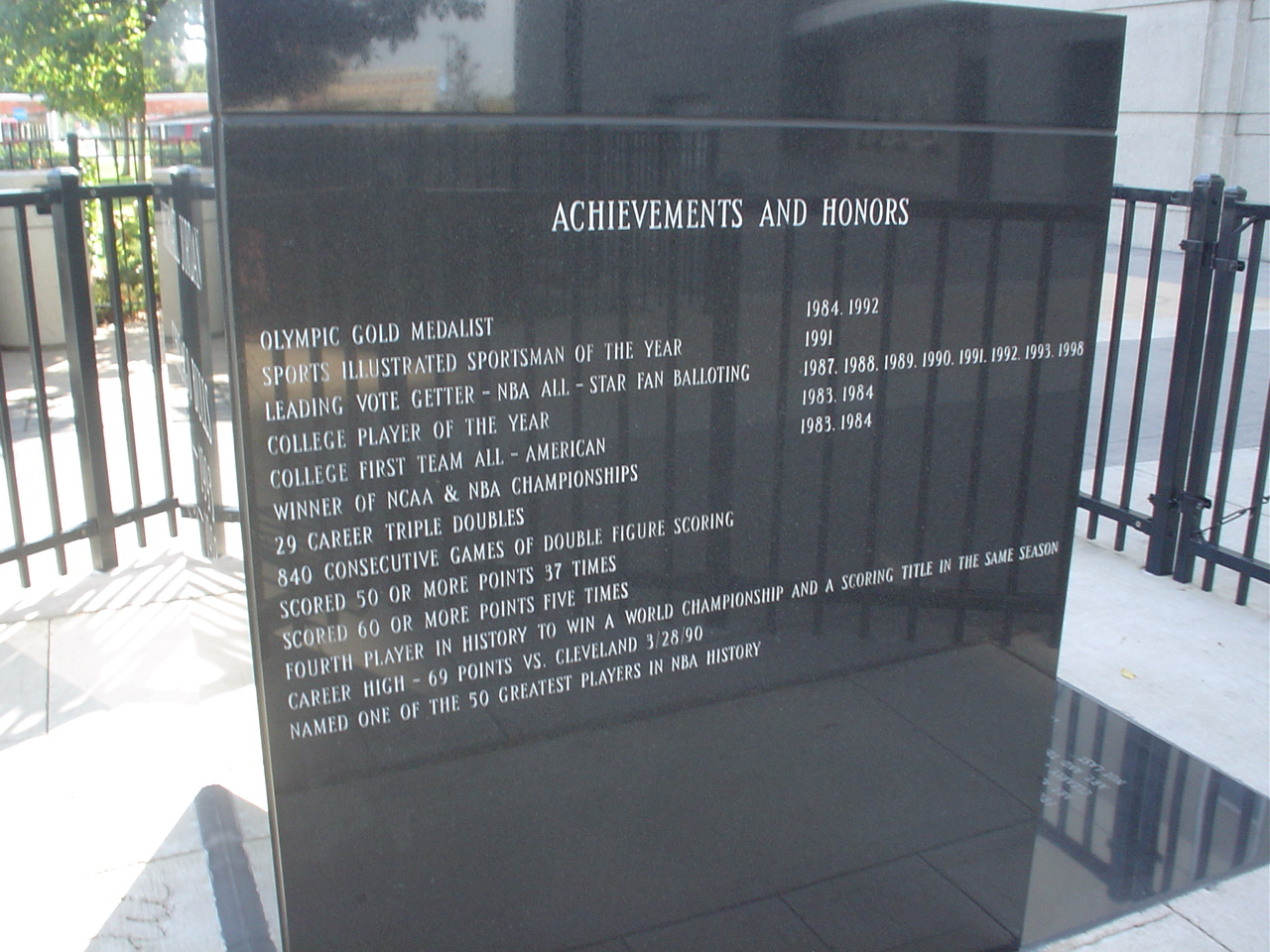
Base of statue (right side) at the United Center chronicling Jordan's career achievements. Image taken before the Center's extension building enclosed the statue.

While the sculpture was a work in progress, the location of the sculptor's rented studio was kept secret from the rest of the world, while the husband-and-wife sculptor team and three assistants spent four months working for sixteen hours every day of the week. The process involved two sittings with Jordan for measurements and photos, including one in which the clay version had to be driven from Chicago to Nashville, to ensure the accuracy of the clay likeness. The 2,000-pound (910 kg) sculpture, which is 12 feet (3.7 m) tall, rests on a 5-foot high black granite base that has an inscription reading "The best there ever was. The best there ever will be." The base also includes a list of his accomplishments. The bronze statue used lost-wax casting. The sculpture has led to a lot of similar work for the couple.

The sculpture's official address is United Center, 1901 W. Madison Street. Officially named The Spirit, it is located inside the United Center (Gate 4). The United Center opened on August 18, 1994. The exact pose of Jordan in midflight is left for artistic interpretation, but speculations include his 63-point performance against Boston in the 1986 NBA Playoffs, the 1988 NBA All-Star Game slam-dunk contest at Chicago Stadium and his jumpman logo that has been on Jordan branded Nike products since the 1980s. Jordan is depicted doing a right-handed slam dunk over two opponents while jumping right-to-left in the eastward facing statue giving him a southbound trajectory. Prior to the beginning of each basketball season, the sculpture gets touched up.

The sculpture was installed on October 31 and unveiled on November 1, 1994, in front of a national audience by Jordan, Reinsdorf and Larry King. Jordan's jersey number was retired during the ceremony. Only Jordan's knee is attached to the base via a triple-steel post. A stationary basketball hoop was almost part of the sculpture too. The sculpture, which is hollow, was designed to withstand the natural elements. After his second retirement following the 1997–98 NBA season, the following quote from the 1992 film A River Runs Through It was added to the base: "At that moment I knew, surely and clearly, that I was witnessing perfection. He stood before us, suspended above the earth, free from all its laws like a work of art, and I knew, just as surely and clearly, that life is not a work of art, and that the moment could not last."

=== Relocation ===
In 2012 and 2014, various plans were floated for the parking lot east of the United Center. On January 22, 2015, the Bulls announced plans to move the statue to a planned atrium, while statues of Bobby Hull and Stan Mikita were to remain outside the United Center. Construction commenced in mid-2015. On March 1, 2017, there was a ceremonial celebration for the opening of the 190,000-square-foot (18,000 m^{2}) United Center east addition. The statue can be found inside the atrium between the new addition and the original United Center, which is open daily from 10:00 AM to 6:00 PM and later on event days.

== Reception and legacy ==
Some complain that the sculpture does not depict Jordan's well-known open-mouthed tongue wag. Chicago Tribune art critic Alan G. Artner says the inscription at the base that reads "The best there ever was. The best there ever will be." refers only to the subject and not the sculpture. Following the Bulls' second three-peat after Jordan's return, the statue became a sports mecca for fans to gather and take photographs. ESPN The Magazine listed the sculpture as one of the ten greatest sports photo opportunities in 1998.

In 1994, 55 (originally planned for 123 pieces) 28-inch (71.1 cm) bronze maquettes of the sculpture on 6-inch (15.2 cm) granite bases were produced by the Rotblatt-Amranys and sold at $10,000 ($21,129 in 2025 dollars) each as a fundraiser for the James Jordan Boys & Girls Club. The TNT 2-hour broadcast of the original ceremony had also been in part a fundraiser for the Boys & Girls Club, but some had thought it was overdone and ungraceful.

At times, the statue has been adorned with various Chicago Blackhawks player jerseys. When Denis Savard's jersey was retired on March 19, 1998, fans put his jersey on the statue, but it was removed one hour later. During the 2010 Stanley Cup Finals, United Center personnel added an ice hockey helmet, a Reebok jersey of captain Jonathan Toews and Reebok ice skates to the statue. Within 48 hours, the Reebok logos on the ice skates had been covered by Nike stickers. When Chicagoan Barack Obama welcomed the Blackhawks to the White House as President of the United States, he made mention of the jersey being placed on the Jordan statue. In May 2011, there was an announcement the Hockey Hall of Famers Stan Mikita and Bobby Hull would have statues placed outside of the United Center near Jordan's sometime early during the 2011–12 NHL season.

== See also ==
- List of public art in Chicago
