= United Center =

Indoor arena in Chicago, Illinois, U.S.

- The House that Jordan Built; The UC; The Madhouse on Madison

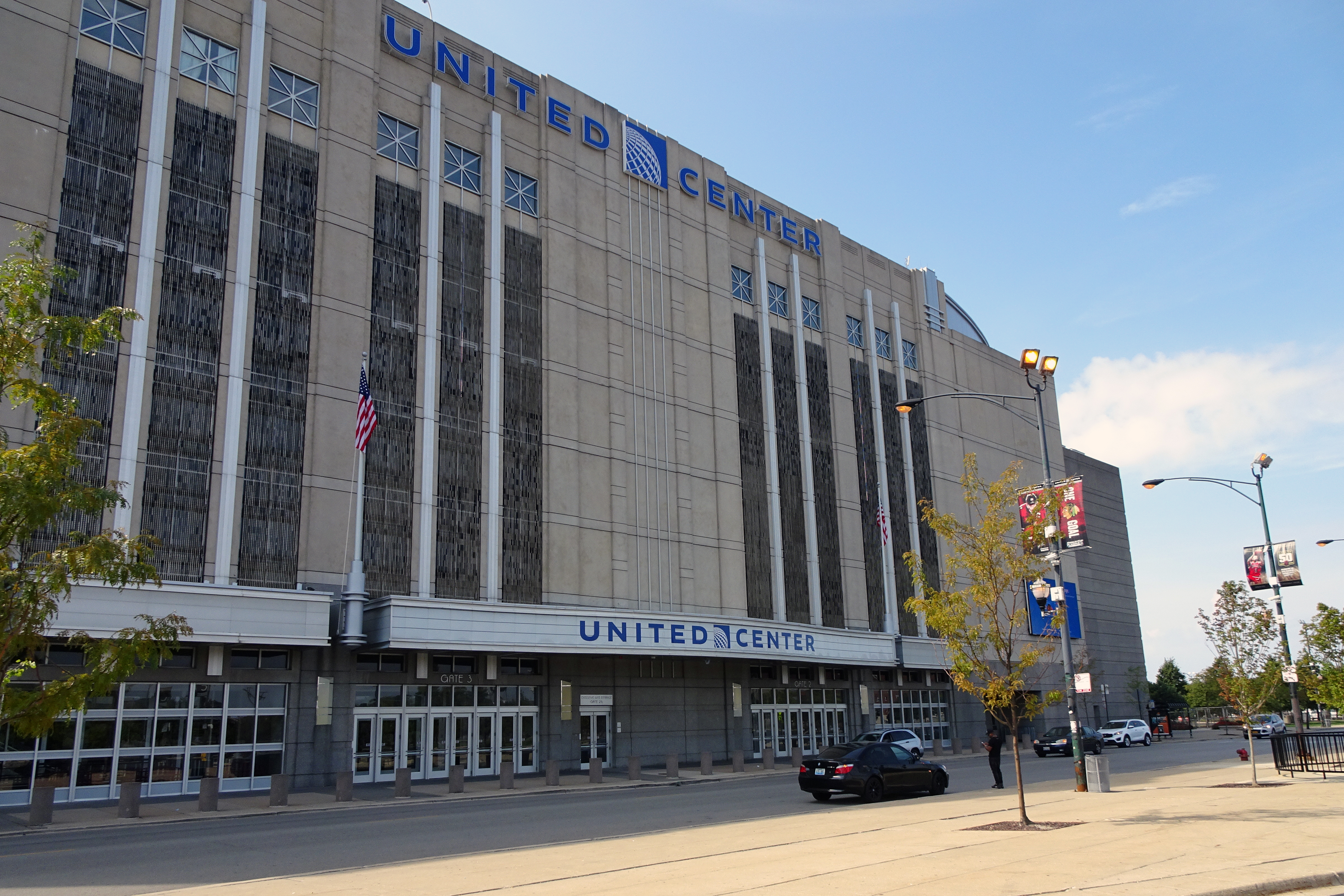
- United Center in September 2015

- Location in Chicago Location in Illinois Location in the United States
- Address: 1901 West Madison Street
- Location: Chicago, Illinois, U.S.
- Coordinates: 41°52′50″N 87°40′27″W
- Owner: United Center Joint Venture (UCJV) (Chicago Bulls 50%/Chicago Blackhawks 50%)
- Operator: United Center Joint Venture
- Capacity: Basketball: 20,917 (23,129 with standing room); Concerts: 23,500; Ice hockey: 19,717 (22,428 with standing room)
- Scoreboard: Mitsubishi Electric
- Record attendance: 22,819 (February 15, 1997 vs. New York Rangers)
- Field size: 960,000 sq ft (89,000 m^{2})
- Public transit: Chicago "L": Green at Damen; GreenPink at Ashland; Blue at Illinois Medical District

Construction
- Groundbreaking: April 6, 1992
- Built: 1992–1994
- Opened: August 18, 1994
- Renovated: 2009–10 (300 Level); 2014 (exterior)
- Expanded: 2016–17 (atrium)
- Cost: $175 million ($380 million in 2025 dollars)
- Architects: Populous (then HOK Sport); W. E. Simpson Company, Inc. Marmon Mok
- Project managers: International Facilities Group, LLC
- Structural engineer: Thornton Tomasetti
- Services engineer: Flack + Kurtz
- General contractor: Morse Diesel/Huber Hunt & Nichols

Tenants
- Chicago Bulls (NBA) (1994–present); Chicago Blackhawks (NHL) (1994–present)

Website
- unitedcenter.com

United Center is an indoor arena on the Near West Side of Chicago, Illinois. It is home to the Chicago Bulls of the National Basketball Association (NBA) and the Chicago Blackhawks of the National Hockey League (NHL). It is named for its corporate sponsor United Airlines. With a seating capacity of up to 23,500, the United Center is the largest arena by capacity in the NBA, and second largest arena by capacity in the NHL after the Bell Centre.

Opened in 1994, the United Center replaced the West Side's Chicago Stadium ("the madhouse on Madison"), which was opened in 1929 and located across Madison Street from the center. It is owned by the Reinsdorf and Wirtz families, owners of the teams that use the arena, and which also own much of the surrounding land. The first event held at the arena was WWF SummerSlam, and it hosts hundreds of sporting events, and concerts a year. The center also hosted the Democratic National Convention in 1996 and 2024. The arena served as the municipal emergency hub in the early days of the COVID-19 pandemic of 2020.

The arena is home to a statue of basketball great Michael Jordan, posed mid-air in his iconic "flying" jump, erected in 1994. Originally outside, it now stands inside an atrium extension and event space which was added to the Center in 2017. The Jordan statue has since been joined by statues of Blackhawks ice hockey players Bobby Hull and Stan Mikita, while a statue of various Blackhawks players is located across the street on the site of Chicago Stadium.

== History ==
Chicago Bulls during the 1996 NBA playoffs at the United Center

Both the Chicago Blackhawks and the Chicago Bulls play their home games at the arena with some of them on back-to-back nights. In the 2023–24 NBA season, the Bulls drew an average attendance of 20,624 in 41 home games, the highest in the NBA. The hardwood floor for the Bulls games is laid over the ice that the Blackhawks play on. The flooring is assembled like a puzzle and taken apart when the Blackhawks have a game.

The Bulls and Blackhawks own and operate the United Center through the United Center Joint Venture (UCJV), a 50/50 partnership. It covers 960,000 square feet (89,000 m^{2}) on a 46-acre (19 ha) parcel, west of the Chicago Loop. The arena is the largest in the United States in size, though not in capacity. Its exterior bears a striking resemblance to that of Chicago Stadium. It seats 19,717 for hockey, 20,917 for basketball and up to 23,500 for concerts. The United Center hosts over 200 events per year and has drawn over 20 million visitors since its opening. Attendance routinely exceeds seating capacity for Bulls and Blackhawks games.

The Bulls opened their practice facility, The Advocate Center, located a block east of the United Center, in 2014. Advocate Health Care owns the naming rights to the facility.

The Blackhawks opened their practice facility, Fifth Third Arena (formerly MB Ice Arena prior to 2019), located two blocks to the south of the United Center, in 2017.

=== Design and construction ===
The original construction of the arena cost $175 million.

The United Center's acoustics were designed to amplify noise to replicate "The Roar" – the din that made Chicago Stadium famous, especially during ice hockey games. The designers originally estimated that the United Center would be 80% as loud as the Chicago Stadium had been. To amplify noise, they placed angled steel panels around the top level in order to reflect noise back into the arena's bowl.

During ice hockey season, the Blackhawks use an Allen TH323 Theatre Organ that is a replica of the Chicago Stadium's famous Barton organ. Recreating the old organ's notes took two years.

The building is 140 feet (43 m) tall, and is of concrete and steel construction, with 3,500 tons of steel being utilized in its construction. While the Blackhawks and Bulls had long planned another arena, an inflated real estate market and the early 1990s recession delayed the project until financing was secured from an international syndicate, with funding by banks from Japan, Australia and France. The arena originally had 216 luxury sky-boxes, the most of any professional ice hockey or basketball venue at the time of its opening. But after the 2009–10 renovation, this had been decreased to 169 executive suites spread across its three levels of suites. It also was originally constructed with 3,000 club seats. The arena also installed a Sony Jumbotron, making it officially the first video scoreboard used by the Bulls and Blackhawks.

Architects originally proposed utilizing limestone and granite for its exterior, however the owners instead decided to have a less expensive precast concrete exterior.

Per the team owners' request, the City of Chicago closed a section of Monroe Street west of the stadium, as the venue's footprint extends into where the road's sidewalk had previously been located. When the venue opened, Chicago Tribune architecture critic Blair Kamin criticized this street closure and other aspects as the venue's design as isolating the venue from its surrounding neighborhood. He argued that the venue's design had intentionally closed the arena off from its surroundings, which at the time included the (since-demolished) Henry Horner Homes public housing.

=== Renovations ===
==== Late 2000s club additions and 300 level renovation ====
In 2005, a new Jumbotron was installed, which featured larger video screens, the removal of the Chicago Stadium-like boards, and additional smaller screens above the four main screens. In 2008, the United Center saw the debut of the Harris Club, private premium seating area that filled space previous occupied by several club-level suites. The Harris Club was an open lounge premium seating area with a capacity of 236 ticketholders fitted with amenities such including a Wii, a pool table, three bars, a buffet, and multiple televisions. Another change was the addition of two bars on the 300 level with open views to the arena bowl.

In time for the 2009–10 season of its sports tenants, the United Center's 300 level saw its concourse renovated with the addition of 144 flat screen televisions, new food and beverage stations above select seating sections and two new bars that open up to panoramic views of the arena. During the 2010 off-season, two additional bars with panoramic views of the arena were added along with the other two that had been added the previous year. Another notable addition were illuminated signs on each side of the arena's 300 level seating bowl reading "Welcome to the Madhouse". The United Center also renovated several of its club-level suites into 32 "theater boxes", which were opera-style boxes seating four-people seating areas with access to an upscale restaurant-style lounge area shared with the other theater boxes. The theater boxes were built on the opposite end of the seating bowl as the Harris Club.

==== 2010s changes ====
After the 2012–13 season, a third panoramic LED bar was installed around the 300 level, which required the removal of the "Welcome to the Madhouse" signs.

A new court floor design was added for the Bulls' 2015–16 season and includes multiple changes. The iconic bull head logo at center court has increased in size by 75% and the image of a basketball that was previously behind the logo has been removed. The "CHICAGO BULLS" text on the endlines has been changed to the font used in the official Bulls logo to make the court design more consistent with the Bulls brand, and the same font has been applied to the "Bulls.com" and the "@ChicagoBulls" text on the north apron of the court. The lines on the court have been changed from red and white to all black to emphasize the bold colors of the Bulls brand. The four stars from the City of Chicago flag have been added to the south apron of the court to highlight the team's civic pride and incorporate the "Chicago Basketball" branding campaign. As of the 2024-2025 Bulls season, the current court features sponsor FanDuel in on the endlines with a smaller text of "CHICAGO BULLS", and Calamos replacing "Bulls.com" and the "@ChicagoBulls" text on the north apron of the court.

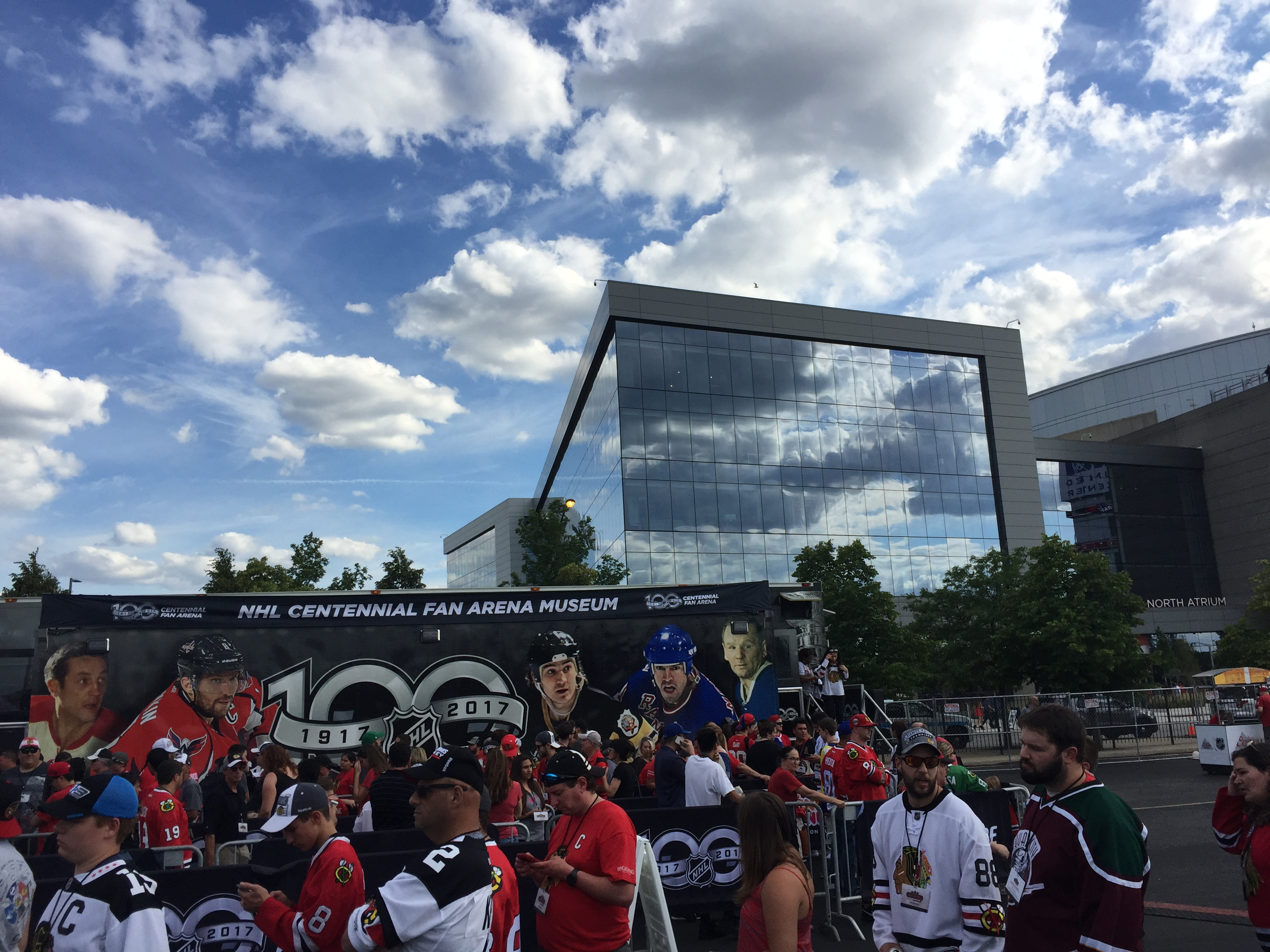
Exterior of the "atrium" addition, viewed while the 2017 NHL Draft was being held at the United Center

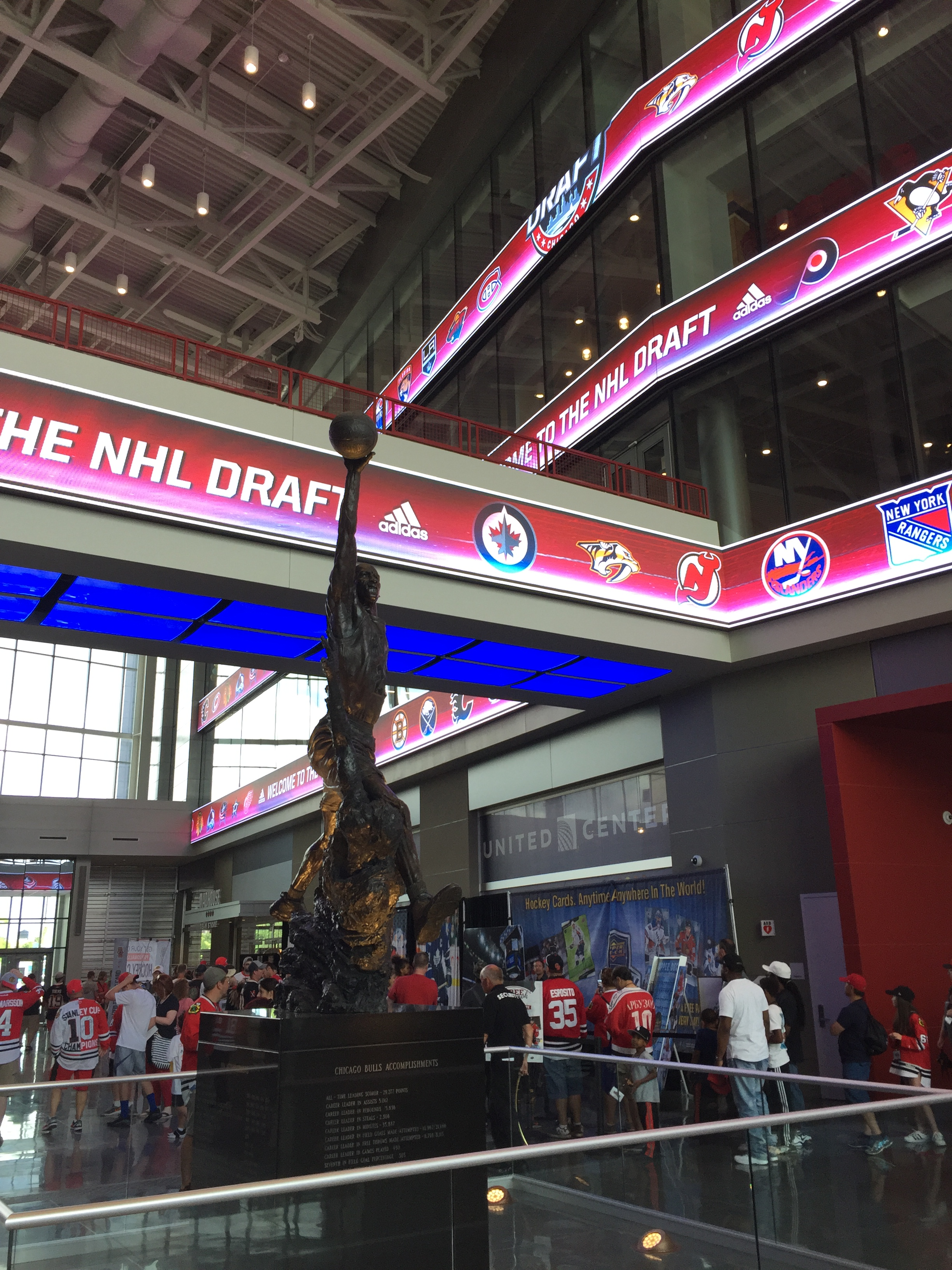
Interior of the United Center "atrium" during the 2017 NHL draft

In March 2017, the United Center opened a new 190,000 square foot privately funded "atrium" addition. The addition featured office space on its second, third, and fourth floors and a gathering place on its first floor which is open to fans and visitors before, during, and after events. The statue of Michael Jordan which formerly sat outside the arena was relocated to the atrium.

In 2019, a new Jumbotron manufactured by Mitsubishi Electric was added to the United Center to replace the 2005 Jumbotron. At its unveiling, it was the largest and highest-resolution scoreboard in any dual-purpose NHL/NBA arena. This scoreboard would be the first used by the Bulls and the Blackhawks to be fully digital, with no non-video sponsor boards. The scoreboard has a 8,600 square feet (800 m^{2}) display with 4 mm pixel spacing, six independent moving panels, and a continuous inner ring display. New audio and lighting systems were installed alongside the scoreboard upgrade.

==== Sportsbook Lounge ====
On February 1, 2022, the United Center and FanDuel Group announced a partnership to develop a sportsbook lounge located off the United Center atrium. The two-story venue was built out as a non-wagering space complete with FanDuel branding with screens featuring other live sports events. With the lounge opened in 2023, betting is still contingent on approval from the Illinois Gaming Board.

==== 1901 Project ====
Construction site for the 1901 Project, October 2026

The Reinsdorf and Wirtz families who own the United Center and much of the surrounding land have considered urban development schemes for the area. In 2024, they announced plans for a $7 billion "mega-development" named the "1901 Project" for the United Center's address number on West Madison Street. The plan includes almost 9,500 new housing units and related neighborhood amenities and business spaces. Like most mega-developments, the project would be phased and could take many years to realize. The first phase includes an auditorium planned as a music venue. Phase 1 of the 1901 Project broke ground in June 2026.

As of 2025, a new CTA Pink Line station is being explored to be built as part of the Project 1901 development. It would be located directly east of the United Center and rebuild the former Madison station that was demolished in 1951.

== Events ==
=== Sports ===
==== Basketball ====
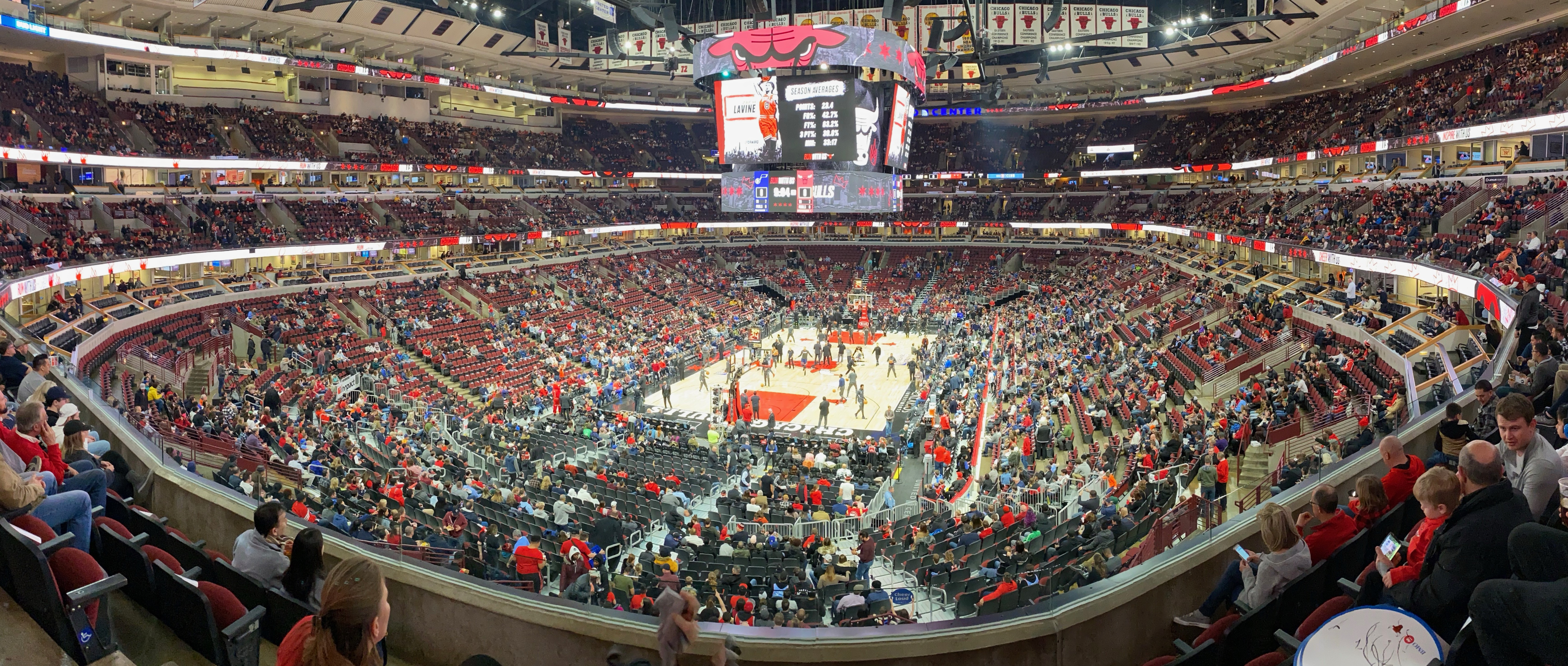
United Center during a Bulls game in January 2020

The arena was the Bulls' home during their second run of three consecutive championships, hosting the 1996, 1997, and 1998 NBA Finals. The Bulls won the 1996 and 1997 series in the sixth game at home, but won the 1998 series at the Delta Center in Salt Lake City, Utah.

In 2020, it hosted the NBA All-Star Game.

The Chicago Sky of the WNBA would host two games at the United Center against the Indiana Fever on June 7 and July 27, 2025. Two Sky home games for 2026 would also be played in the United Center: June 28 against the Las Vegas Aces, and August 8 against the Fever. The arena also hosted the 2026 WNBA All-Star Game.

==== Ice hockey ====
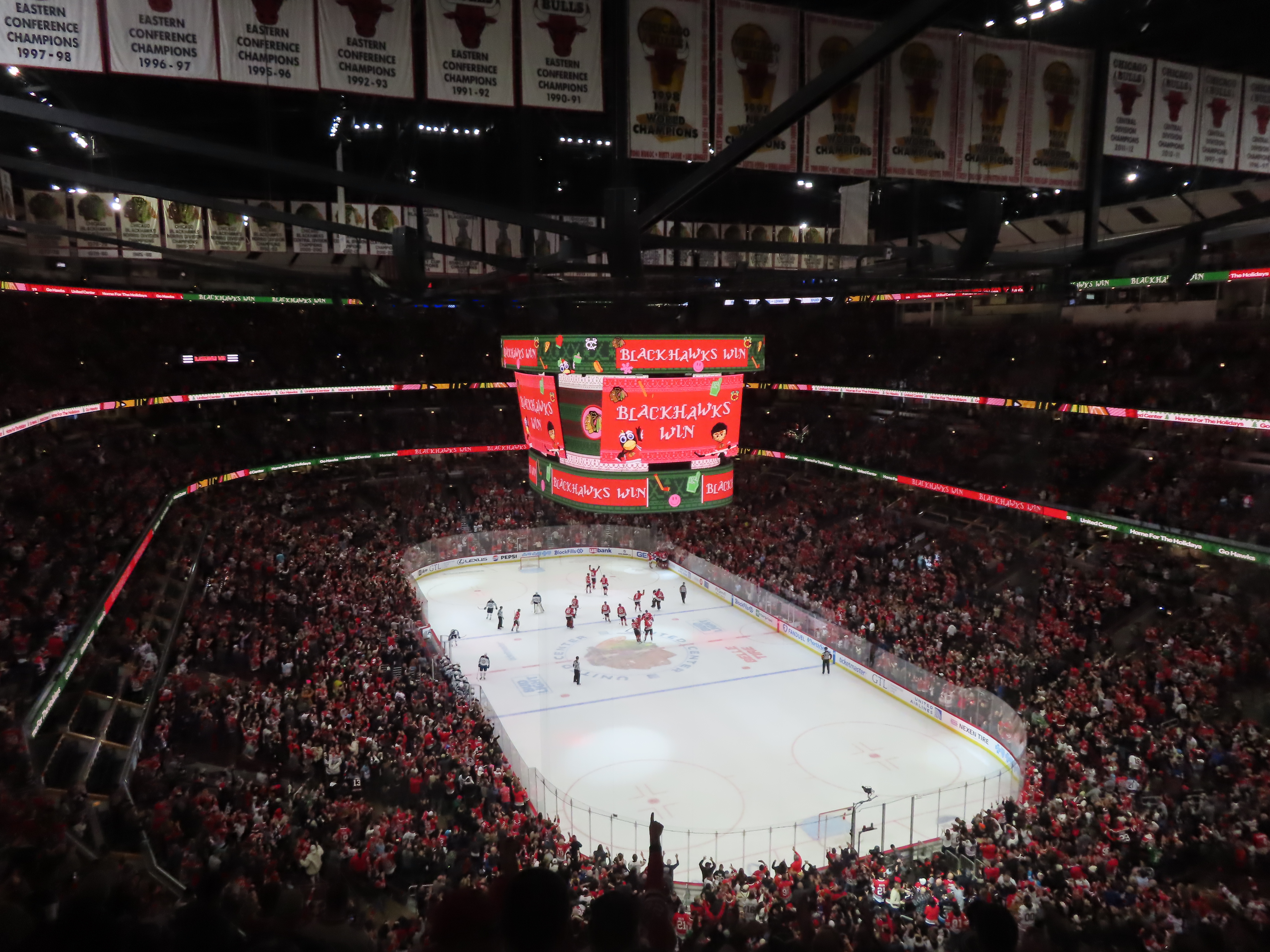
United Center during a Blackhawks game in December 2023

The arena has hosted the Stanley Cup Finals three times: in 2010, 2013, and 2015. The Blackhawks clinched two Stanley Cups on the ice of their opponent in the sixth game of the series (Philadelphia's Wachovia Center in 2010 and Boston's TD Garden in 2013). The Blackhawks won the 2015 Finals against the Tampa Bay Lightning at home in the sixth game, the first time since 1938 the Hawks clinched the Cup in Chicago.

In 2017, it hosted the 2017 NCAA Division I Frozen Four on April 6–8, which was the first Frozen Four in history to be hosted in the state of Illinois. On October 2, 2024, the NCAA announced the Frozen Four would return to the arena in 2028.

Both the 2017–18 and 2018–19 seasons saw the United Center hosting the University of Wisconsin Badgers and Notre Dame Fighting Irish rivalry game.

The Illinois State High School Hockey Championships are hosted at the United Center yearly for the Blackhawk Cup, and starting in 2024 the Northern Illinois Hockey League also hosted their championships at the United Center.

The Professional Women's Hockey League (PWHL) will play its first game at the United Center on January 9, 2027 between the Detroit Clutch and Minnesota Frost.

==== NCAA basketball ====
In addition to 41 Bulls and Blackhawks games each year, the United Center has hosted other sporting events such as University of Illinois basketball, the Big Ten men's basketball tournament (from the first tournament in 1998 to 2001, then in odd-numbered years from 2003 to 2007 and again in 2013, 2015, 2019 and 2023), the NCAA men's basketball tournament (hosted six times, including 2022), the Champions Classic (in 2013, 2015, 2017 and 2023), the Roundball Classic, and the Great Eight Classic.

==== Professional wrestling ====
The United Center was also the site of the known then as the World Wrestling Federation pay-per-view SummerSlam in 1994—the first major event held inside the building, and also the last televised major event from the promotion held in the building for 31 years, now known as the WWE, as they have traditionally held their Chicago events at Allstate Arena. It also hosted the last of WCW's annual Spring Stampede pay-per-views in 2000. On March 3, 2018, WWE returned to the United Center for the first time in over 20 years with a Raw brand "Road to WrestleMania" house show.

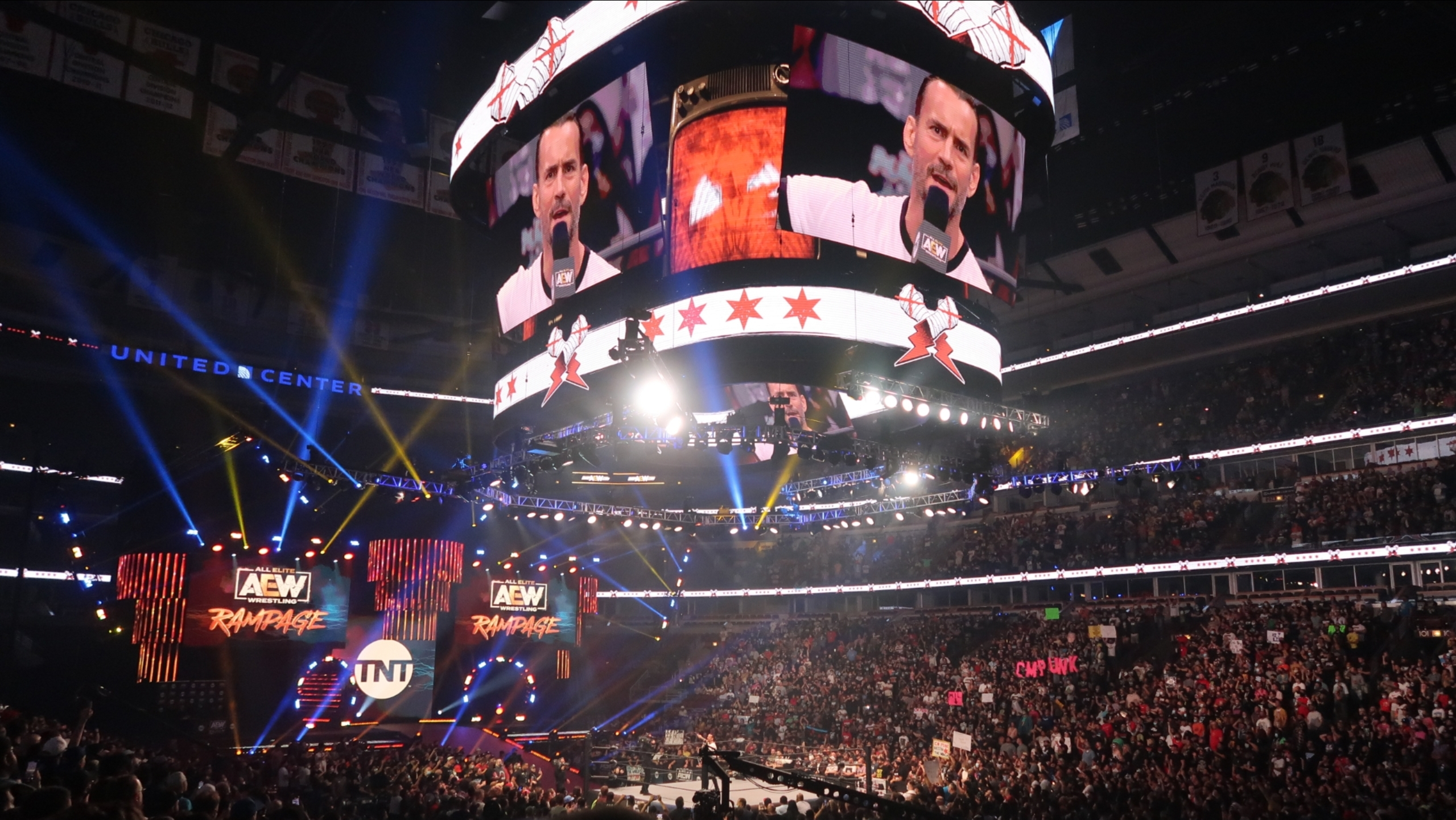
AEW Rampage: The First Dance at the United Center in August 2021

During a special episode of AEW Dynamite, titled Fight For the Fallen on July 28, 2021, Tony Schiavone announced that All Elite Wrestling (AEW) would host the second episode of their television series, AEW Rampage, at the United Center on August 20, 2021, subtitled "The First Dance" in what would be the first televised wrestling event to take place in the United Center since 2000. The event marked Chicago native CM Punk's AEW debut and return to professional wrestling after a retirement of 7 years from the sport. AEW also held another event at the United Center in partnership with New Japan Pro-Wrestling (NJPW) on June 26, 2022, titled AEW×NJPW: Forbidden Door. AEW then hosted the premiere of AEW Collision on Saturday, June 17, 2023, with the return of CM Punk being a headliner for the event. The venue also hosted the AEW pay-per-view All Out on September 3, 2023.

On February 28, 2026, WWE hosted their annual Elimination Chamber event at the arena. This was the first time that WWE returned to the United Center since 2018, and the first PLE since the aforementioned SummerSlam in 1994.

==== Mixed martial arts ====
On January 28, 2012, the Ultimate Fighting Championship held its first nationally televised event at the arena. UFC on Fox: Evans vs. Davis was the UFC's second live prime-time event on Fox. The headlining fight was former UFC Light Heavyweight Champion Rashad Evans against Phil Davis, with Evans winning by unanimous decision. The United Center also hosted UFC on Fox: Johnson vs. Dodson in 2013 and UFC on Fox: Henderson vs. Thomson in 2014. The UFC announced in mid-January 2015 that the United Center would be host of UFC on Fox: Dillashaw vs. Barao 2.

On June 9, 2018, the United Center hosted UFC 225: Whittaker vs. Romero 2 which was its first PPV event. Returning a year later, the UFC hosted UFC 238: Cejudo vs. Moraes at the arena. The UFC returned to the arena six years later for UFC 319: du Plessis vs. Chimaev.

==== Bull riding ====
On the weekend of March 5–6, 2011, the Professional Bull Riders made their Built Ford Tough Series debut at the United Center. It was their third Chicago-area visit, having previously visited Rosemont's Allstate Arena in 2006 and 2008. The event at the United Center presented a unique scenario as instead of dirt, white crushed stone was used to cover the arena floor.

==== Tennis ====
In September 2018, the United Center hosted the second edition of the Laver Cup. The tennis competition featured Team Europe vs. Team World.

==== Gymnastics ====
On October 13, 2016, the arena hosted the Kellogg's Tour of Gymnastics Champions.

=== Entertainment ===
==== Concerts ====
With a seating capacity of 23,500 for concerts, the United Center has been a home to many concert performances. The first was Billy Joel, who stated the "...acoustics could use some work.." Harry Styles, Olivia Rodrigo, P!nk, New Kids on the Block, Guns N' Roses, Prince, Beyoncé, Adele, The Smashing Pumpkins, Radiohead, Taylor Swift, Madonna, U2, Rolling Stones, Phish Tina Turner, Van Halen, Iron Maiden, Aerosmith, KISS, Bon Jovi, Barbra Streisand, Billie Eilish, Bruce Springsteen, Paul McCartney, Janet Jackson, Blackpink, Twice, Celine Dion, Coldplay, BTS, Stray Kids, Seventeen, Enhypen, NCT 127, The Who, Pearl Jam, Green Day, blink-182, Jay-Z, Mary J. Blige, Nicki Minaj, Ariana Grande, Lady Gaga, Twenty One Pilots, Kacey Musgraves, Muse, The Killers, Rod Wave, Megan Thee Stallion, Katy Perry, Dua Lipa, Sabrina Carpenter, Tate McRae and Ado have all had sold-out shows for their concerts in this arena, as well as Dave Matthews Band, who released its 1998 show at the venue, entitled Live in Chicago 12.19.98 at the United Center. Contemporary Christian music has also been played at this venue, on tours such as the Tomlin UNITED tour in June 2022, featuring Hilllsong UNITED, Chris Tomlin, and Pat Barrett.

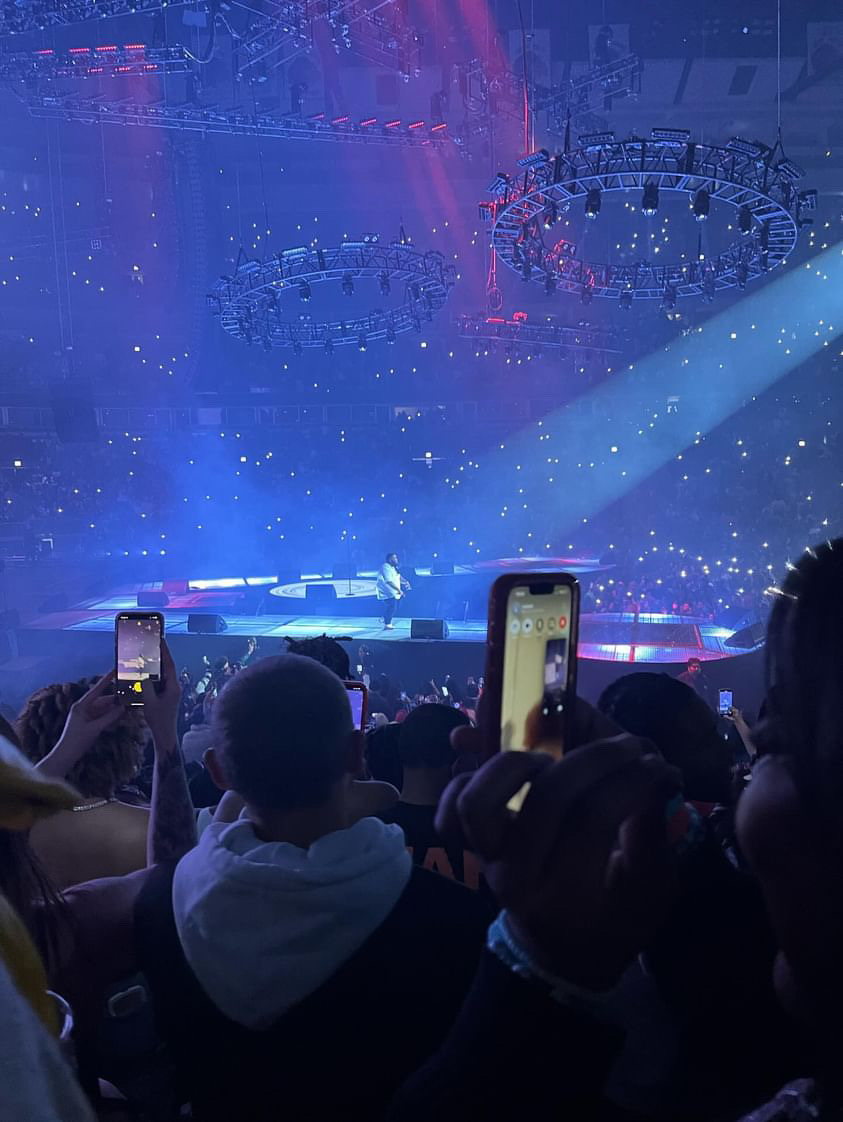
Rod Wave Concert at the United Center in November 2023

==== Family events ====
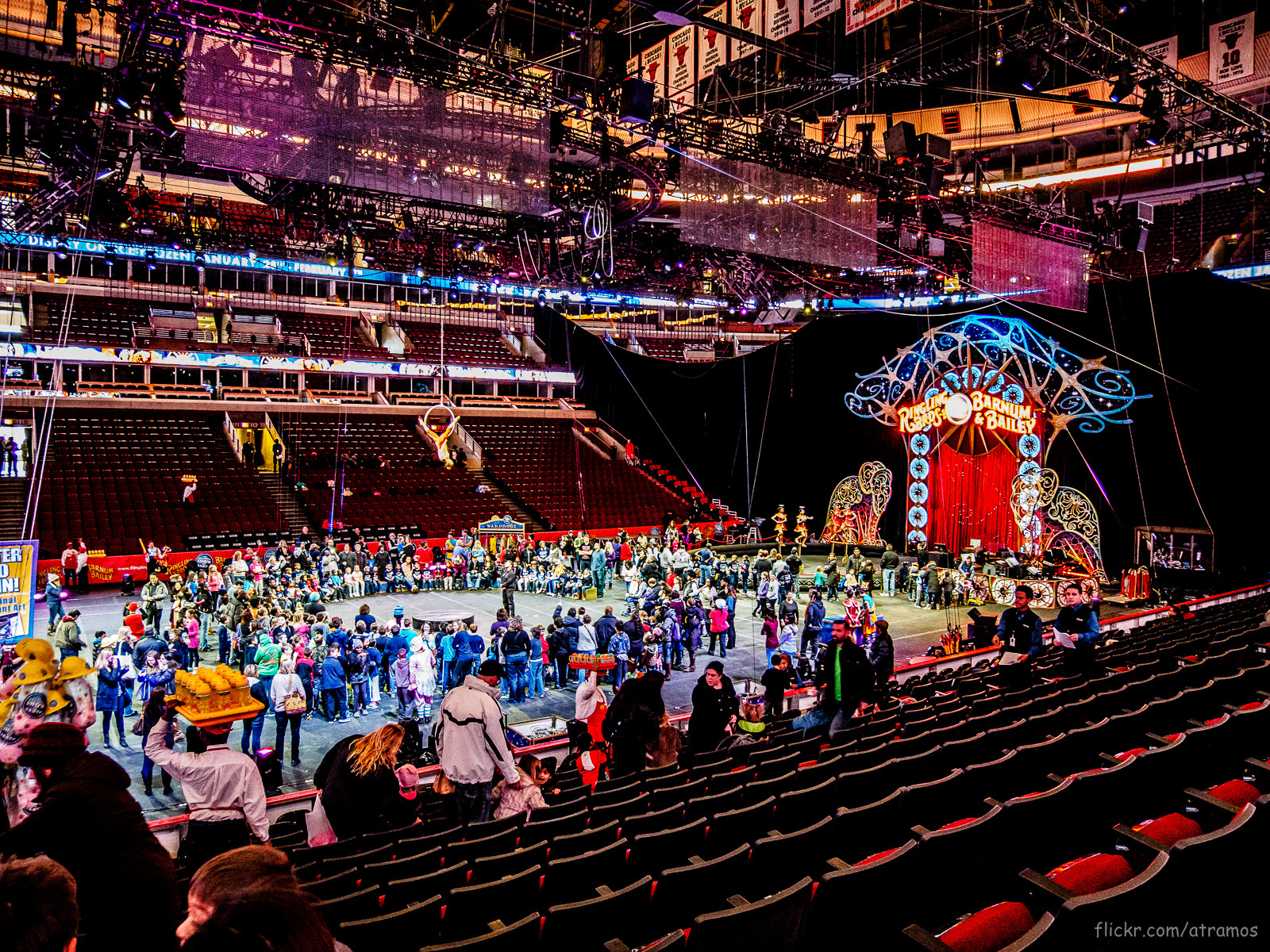
Ringling Bros & Barnum & Bailey Circus performing at the United Center in November 2014

The United Center has also provided a Chicago home for the Ringling Bros. and Barnum & Bailey Circus (last performance was 2016, and they permanently shut down on May 21, 2017) and Disney on Ice, which occur once per year; the Bulls and Blackhawks have a tradition of taking a two-week road trip when the circus is in town. After Ringling left Chicago for one final time in November 2016, the Bulls and Blackhawks allowed Ringling's sister production Disney on Ice to perform its last two-week show in February 2017, before being condensed to a one-week period effective February 2018.

==== Television events ====
On May 17, 2011, Oprah The Farewell Season: Oprah's Surprise Spectacular was taped at the United Center. The program aired on television on May 23 and 24, 2011. Pictures from the event are displayed inside the arena entrance on the wall of Gate 4.

=== Political events ===
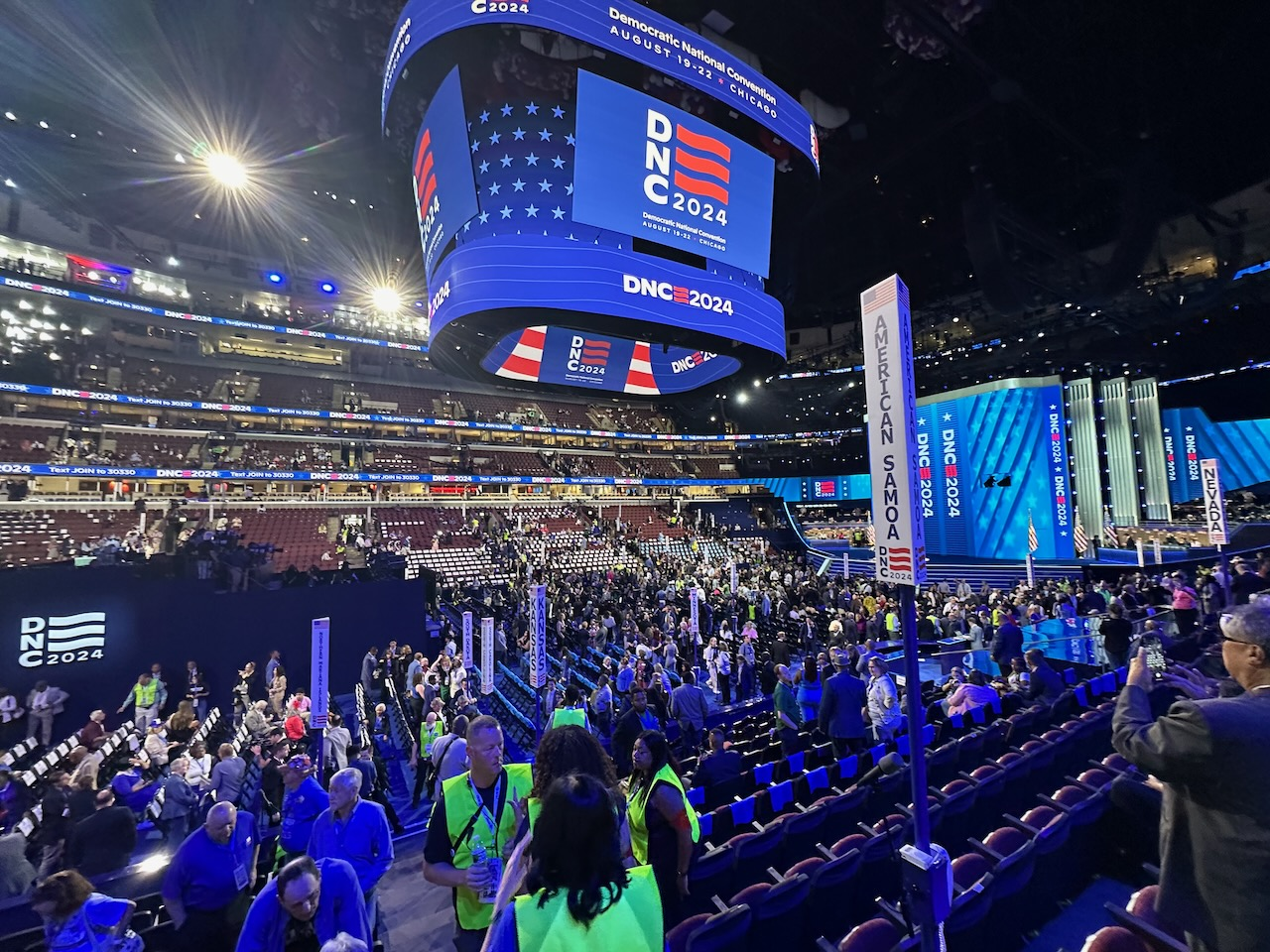
United Center setup during the 2024 Democratic National Convention

The United Center was also the venue of the 1996 Democratic National Convention, where the Democratic Party nominated as its presidential and vice-presidential candidates Bill Clinton and Al Gore, the incumbent holders of the respective offices, who would be reelected as a result of the general election held that November. The United Center also hosted the 2024 Democratic National Convention.

== Statues ==
Several statues of Bulls and Blackhawks greats exist inside and around the outside of the arena.

The most well-known of these is the statue of Michael Jordan, also known as "The Spirit", on the east side of the arena in an atrium (opened in 2017) outside Gate Four. Originally installed in 1994, during Jordan's first retirement and just after the arena's opening, the statue features Jordan mid-dunk over an opposing player, with his tenures with the Bulls and career stats engraved on the bottom. The statue was initially located directly in front of the arena.

In 2000, in honor of the team's 75th anniversary, a statue of various Blackhawks greats from different eras, along with the franchise's Indian head logo, was erected on the north side of the stadium across Madison Street, near the former Chicago Stadium site. The back of the statue features the names of all Blackhawks players up to that point, along with a marble plaque commemorating Chicago Stadium. In October 2020, the statue was vandalized in protest of the team's use of Native American iconography as a logo and was temporarily removed for repairs.

Blackhawks legends Bobby Hull and Stan Mikita received bronze statues in their honor outside of the United Center during the 2011–12 NHL season.

In 2011, a bronze bust of Bulls great Scottie Pippen was dedicated in the stadium's first-floor concourse.

== Sponsorship ==
United Center's logo from 1994 to 2011; the wordmark was updated in 2000.

United Center's logo since 2011 after merging with Continental Airlines in 2010.

United Airlines paid about $1.8 million per year in 2014 for its naming rights.

On May 2, 2010, United announced they would be merging with Continental Airlines, resulting in the United name being kept but with Continental's globe logo and corporate look being retained, eliminating the tulip symbol. On August 11, 2010, a new logo for the combined airline was released and the rebranding would be completed on October 1, 2010, just before the 2010–11 NBA and NHL seasons started. Despite this change, the arena continued to use United's previous tulip logo for the 2010–11 season and in the 2011 NHL and NBA playoffs due to scheduling constraints with rebranding in time for the start of the season. In the summer of 2011, all the previous United tulip signs were at last replaced with the globe logo to reflect the new identity of the combined airline in time for the 2011–12 NHL and NBA seasons and onwards, nearly a year after the merger and identity change had initially gone into effect by United themselves. Two new lit signs on the east and west ends of the arena saying "United Center" with the United globe in the middle were also revealed below the upper-level suites complementing the former "Madhouse" signs on the north and south sides.

In December 2013, it was announced that an agreement had been reached to keep United's naming rights for the arena for another 20 years. The United Center will see a series of updates and upgrades to the interior and exterior of the building. New signage, additional LED boards, and other elements have been added after reaching this agreement. LED screens have been installed on the north side of the arena along with a panoramic LED board on the 300 level, eliminating the "Welcome To The Madhouse" sign.

Anheuser-Busch has also established a sponsorship. They are partners with both the Chicago Bulls and Chicago Blackhawks and have gained rights to signage inside the arena along with a pub.

PepsiCo and the United Center announced on July 12, 2023, a multi-year partnership to become the official soft drink of the United Center, Chicago Bulls and Chicago Blackhawks, replacing Coca-Cola.

== Seating capacity ==
Basketball
Years	Capacity
1994–2009	21,711
2009–present	20,917

Ice hockey
Years	Capacity
1994–2009	20,500
2009–present	19,717

Concerts
Years	Capacity
1994–present	23,500

== See also ==
- List of indoor arenas in the United States
- List of indoor arenas by capacity

Events and tenants
Preceded by Chicago Stadium	Home of the Chicago Blackhawks; 1994–present	Succeeded by
Preceded by Chicago Stadium	Home of the Chicago Bulls; 1994–present	Succeeded by
