= Murals of Kobe Bryant =

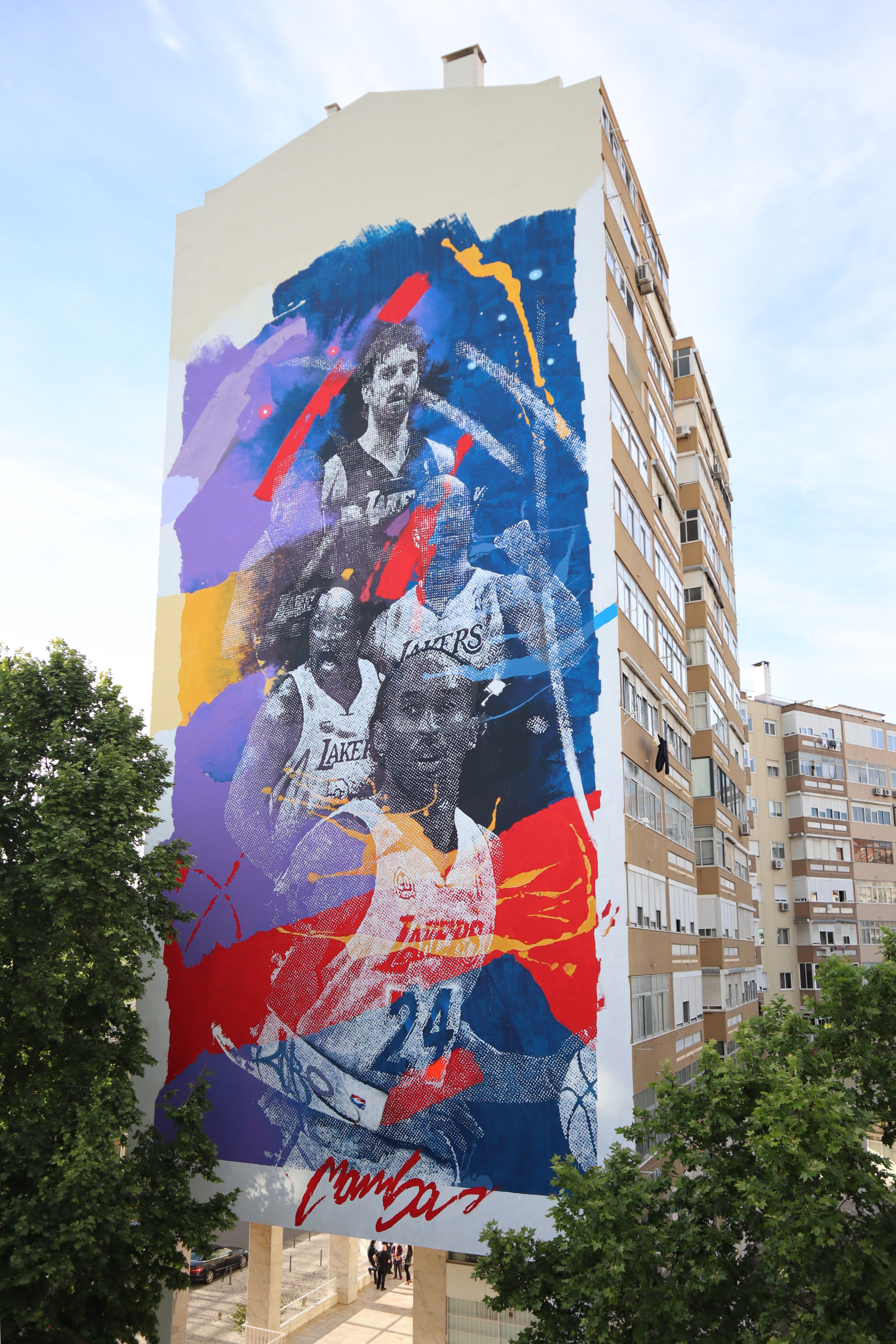
Mural depicting Kobe Bryant and other basketball players, 2021

More than 600 murals depicting American professional basketball player Kobe Bryant have been painted in dozens of countries, including Croatia, Haiti, Uganda, and the United States. Many of these were created following Bryant's death in a helicopter crash in 2020.

== United States ==
A mural in Laredo, Texas, took ten months to complete.

=== California ===
The website KobeMural.com has identified and mapped hundreds of murals in Southern California.

There are many murals of Bryant in Greater Los Angeles, including in Long Beach and Venice. In Downtown Los Angeles, Jonas Never painted a mural on Lebanon Street. The Nelson's Liquor in Burbank has a mural by Isaac Pelayo. The Western Avenue side of the United Auto Center in Jefferson Park has a mural by Danny Mateo. In Melrose, JC Ro painted a mural on the side of a Shoe Palace store. The Burger City Grill in Torrance has a mural by Mike Trujillo. In South Los Angeles' Westmont community, a mural by Manny Sayes appears on the JS Liquor & Market at the intersection of Century Boulevard and Vermont.

There are several murals of Bryant in Orange County, and others in the San Francisco Bay Area.

== Gallery ==
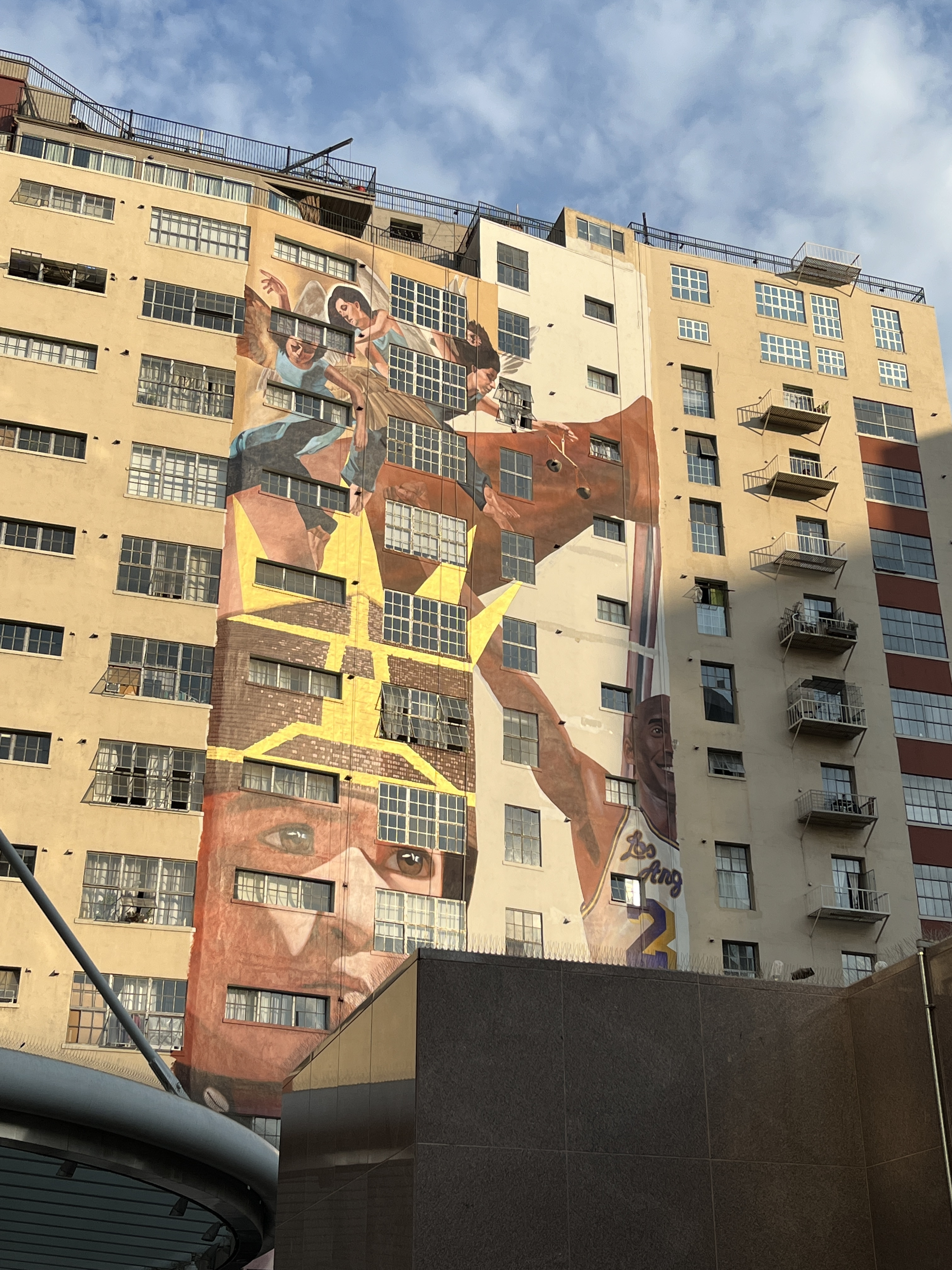
Mural near Pershing Square, Los Angeles (2022)

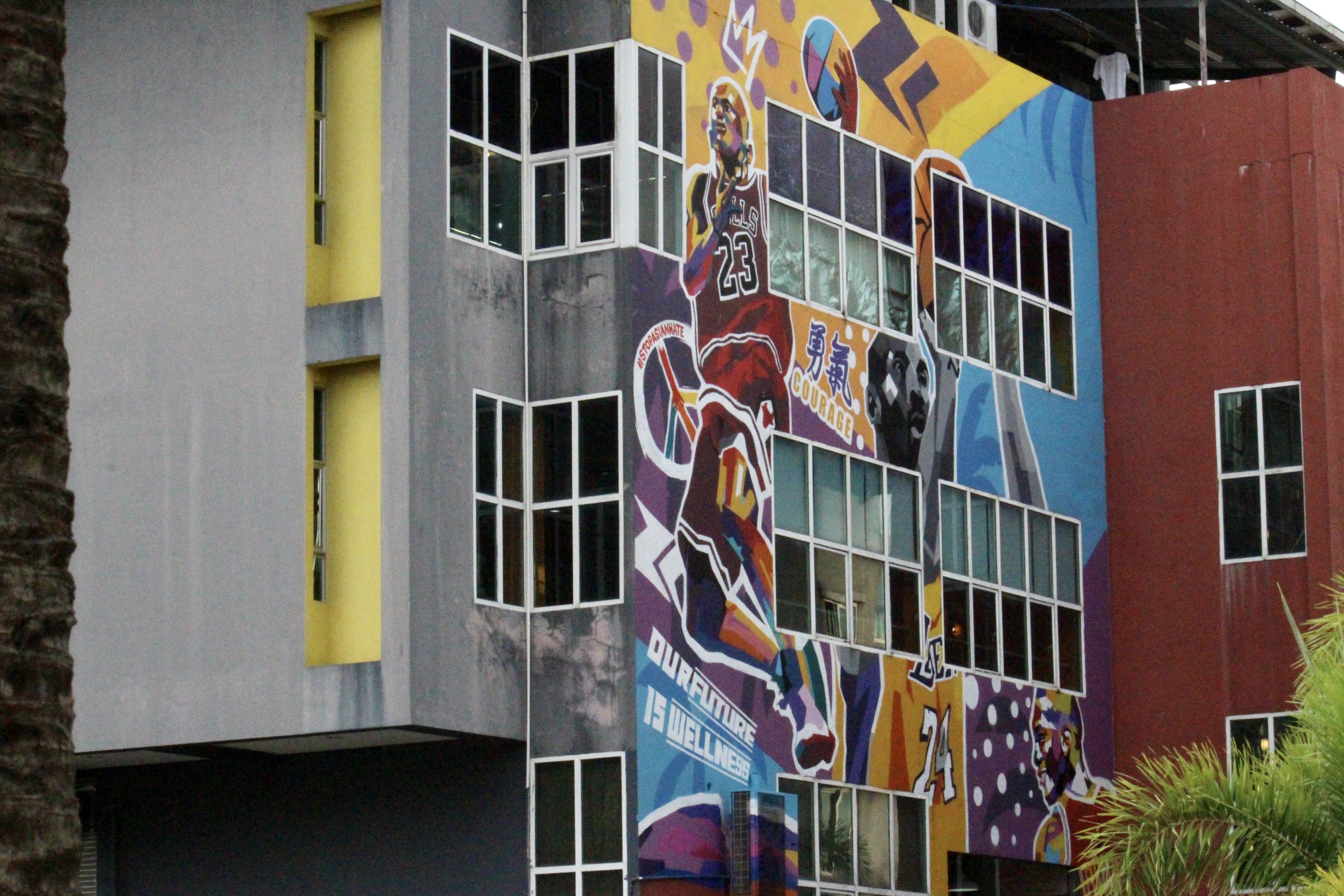
Mural in Kiulap, Brunei (2022)

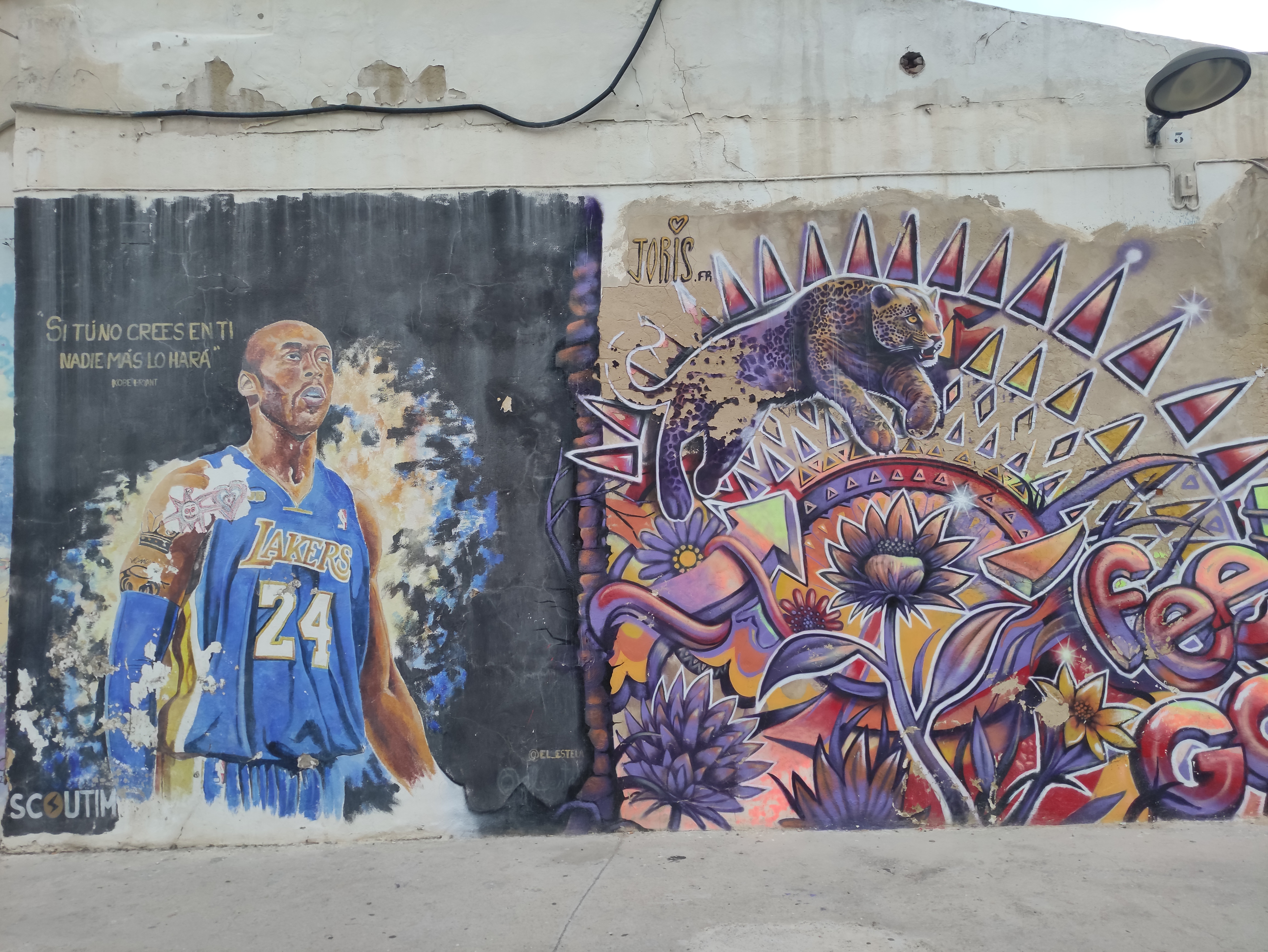
Mural in El Cabanyal, Valencia, Spain (2024)

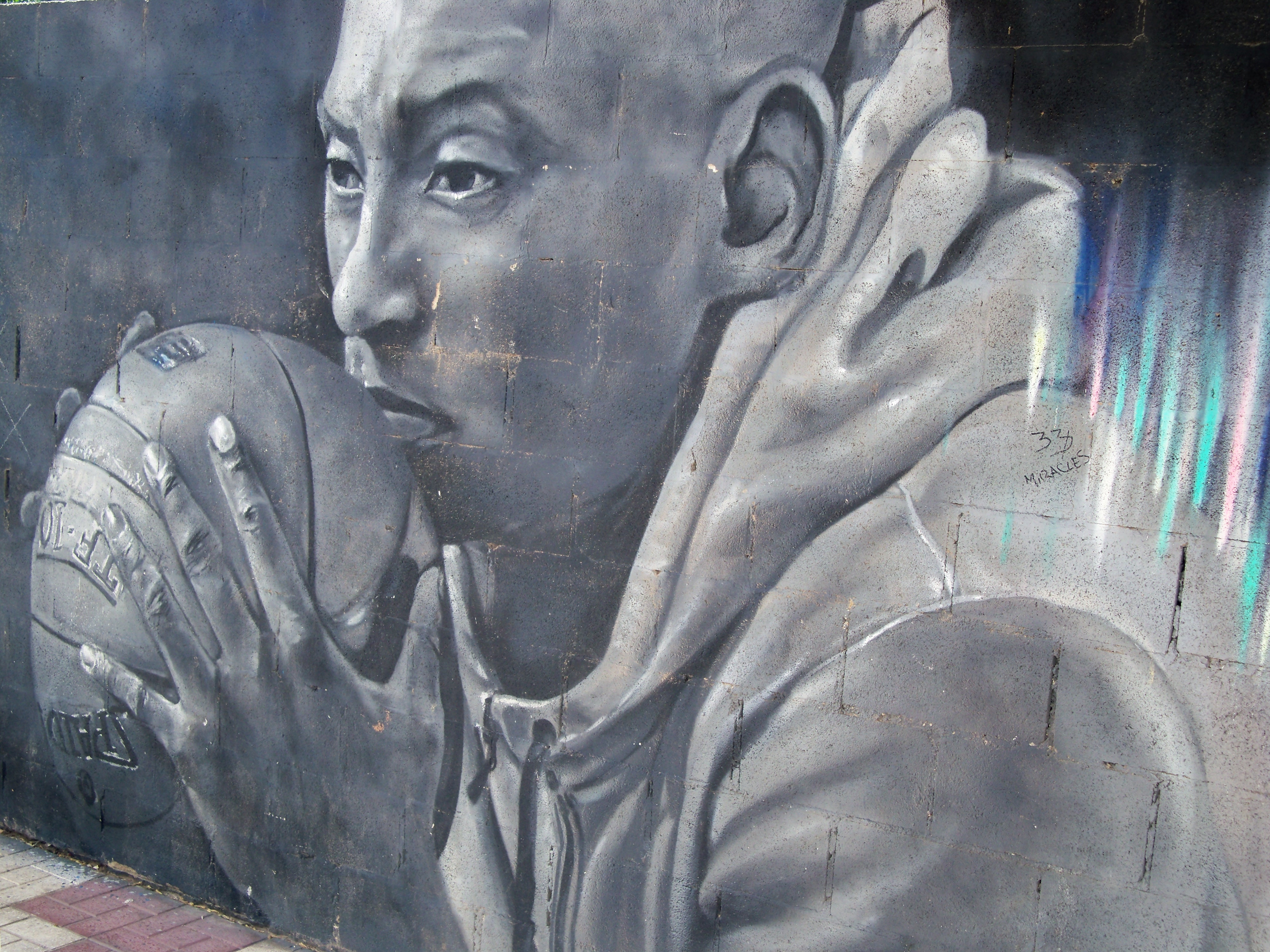
Mural on Malasaña Street in Málaga, Spain (2023)

== See also ==
- Murals of Los Angeles
- Statue of Kobe Bryant
