= Vanessa Bryant =

American philanthropist and public figure (born 1982)

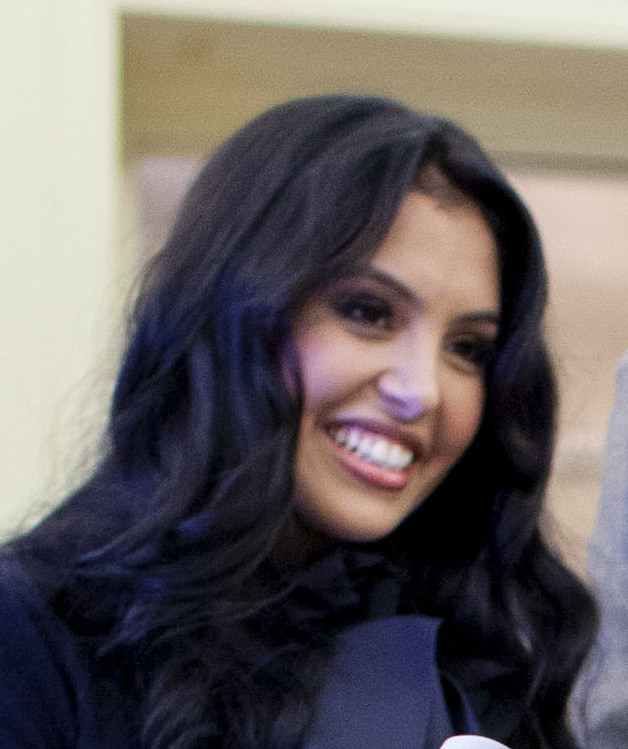
- Bryant at the White House in 2010
- Born: Vanessa Urbieta Cornejo; May 5, 1982 (age 44); Los Angeles, California, U.S.
- Other name: Vanessa Laine
- Occupations: Philanthropist; business executive
- Title: President and CEO of Granity Studios; Board of Directors of Bodyarmor SuperDrink
- Spouse: Kobe Bryant (m. 2001; died 2020)
- Children: 4 (including Gianna)

Vanessa Marie Bryant (born Vanessa Urbieta Cornejo; May 5, 1982) is an American businesswoman and philanthropist. She was married to American professional basketball player Kobe Bryant.

In 2007, she and her husband founded the Kobe and Vanessa Bryant Foundation to provide scholarships to minority college students worldwide. She also leads the Mamba and Mambacita Sports Foundation, which supports underserved child athletes.

In 2023, Bryant settled a lawsuit against Los Angeles County related to the January 26, 2020, helicopter crash that killed her husband and daughter Gianna.

== Early life ==
Bryant was born Vanessa Urbieta Cornejo on May 5, 1982, in Los Angeles, California, to Mexican immigrant Sofía Urbieta. After her parents divorced when she was three, her father abandoned them and moved to Mexico; she was estranged from her father. Her mother was a shipping clerk at an electronics company who married her coworker Stephen Laine in 1990. Bryant began using Laine's surname instead of her birth father’s, Cornejo, and officially changed her name to Vanessa Marie Laine in 2000, despite never officially being adopted by her step-father. She has an older sister, Sophie.

Her single mother worked multiple jobs to make ends meet. The family lived in her maternal aunt's spare room until her mother married Laine, after which they moved to Garden Grove. She attended Marina High School in Huntington Beach.

In August 1999, Bryant and her friend Rowena Ireifej attended a hip-hop concert at Irvine Meadows Amphitheatre. They were approached by a company and offered work as music video extras and backup dancers. Bryant later appeared in music videos for artists including Krayzie Bone and Snoop Dogg. In November 1999, 17-year-old Bryant was working as a background dancer for Tha Eastsidaz rap music video "G'd Up" when she met Kobe Bryant, who was on set working on a rap album.

Their high-profile relationship caused disruptions at her high school, leading Bryant to complete her senior year at home as an independent study; she graduated in 2000. Her mother and step-father filed for bankruptcy in 2000 and divorced in 2002, citing infidelity. She was estranged from her step-father.

== Career and philanthropy ==
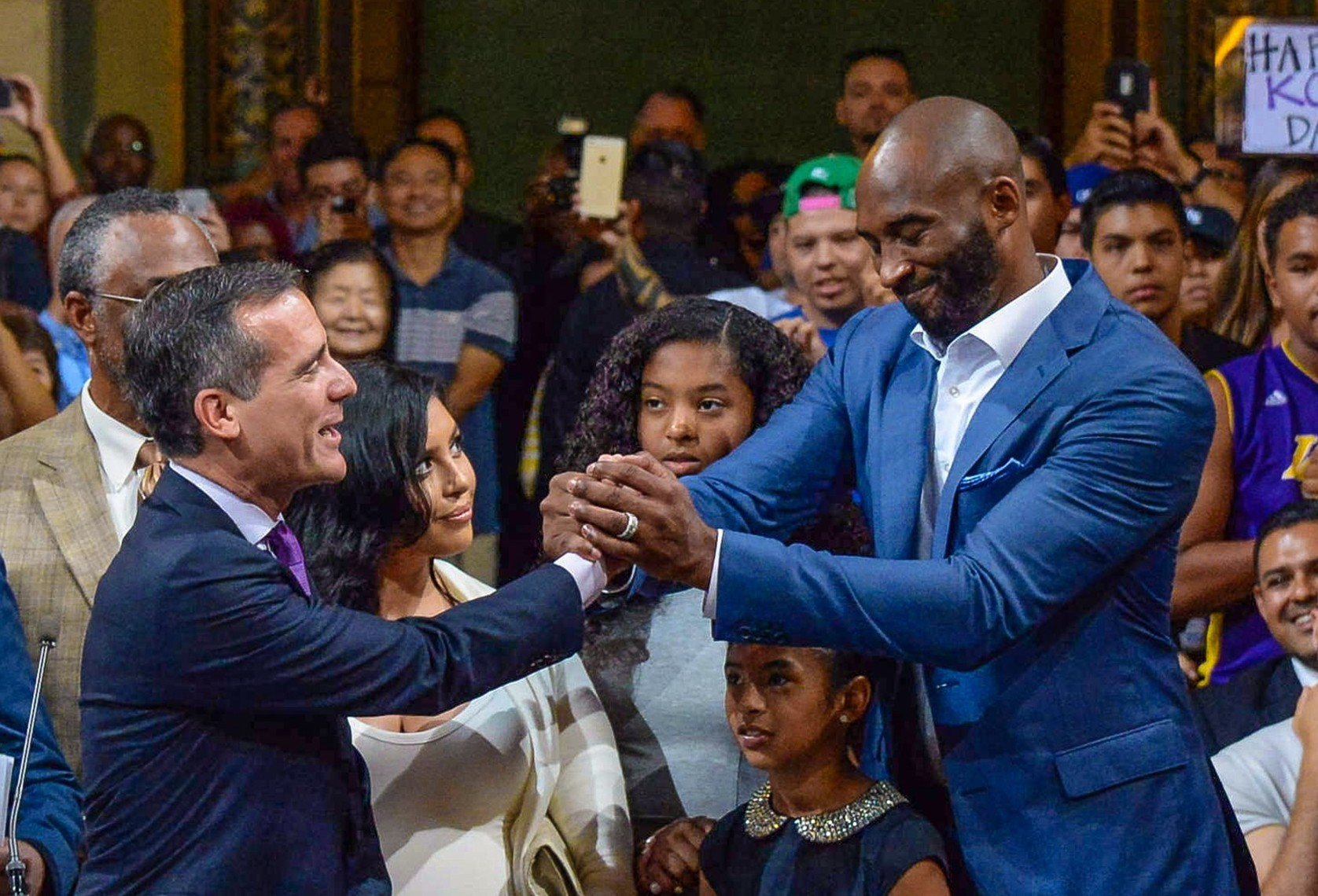
The Bryants and Eric Garcetti in 2016

In 2007, Bryant and her husband founded the VIVO Foundation which was later renamed the Kobe and Vanessa Bryant Foundation. It is a charity that supports increasing a global perspective among young people. It provides scholarships for minority college students and other youth worldwide. The charity has collaborated with the Make-A-Wish Foundation.

Bryant and her husband were founding donors of the National Museum of African American History and Culture.

In 2020, after the death of her husband and second-oldest daughter, Bryant changed the name of her husband's Mamba Sports Foundation to the Mamba and Mambacita Sports Foundation in honor of her daughter. It supports poor child athletes. In May 2021, Bryant launched a Mambacita line of clothing in honor of her daughter Gianna. The line is in partnership with a female-owned brand, Dannijo, and all proceeds go towards the Mambacita Sports Foundation.

Bryant was the president and chief executive officer of Granity Studios.

Bryant worked with Baby2Baby to provide support for women and children in poverty. At the Baby2Baby 10-year gala in November 2021, she received a philanthropy award.

== Personal life ==
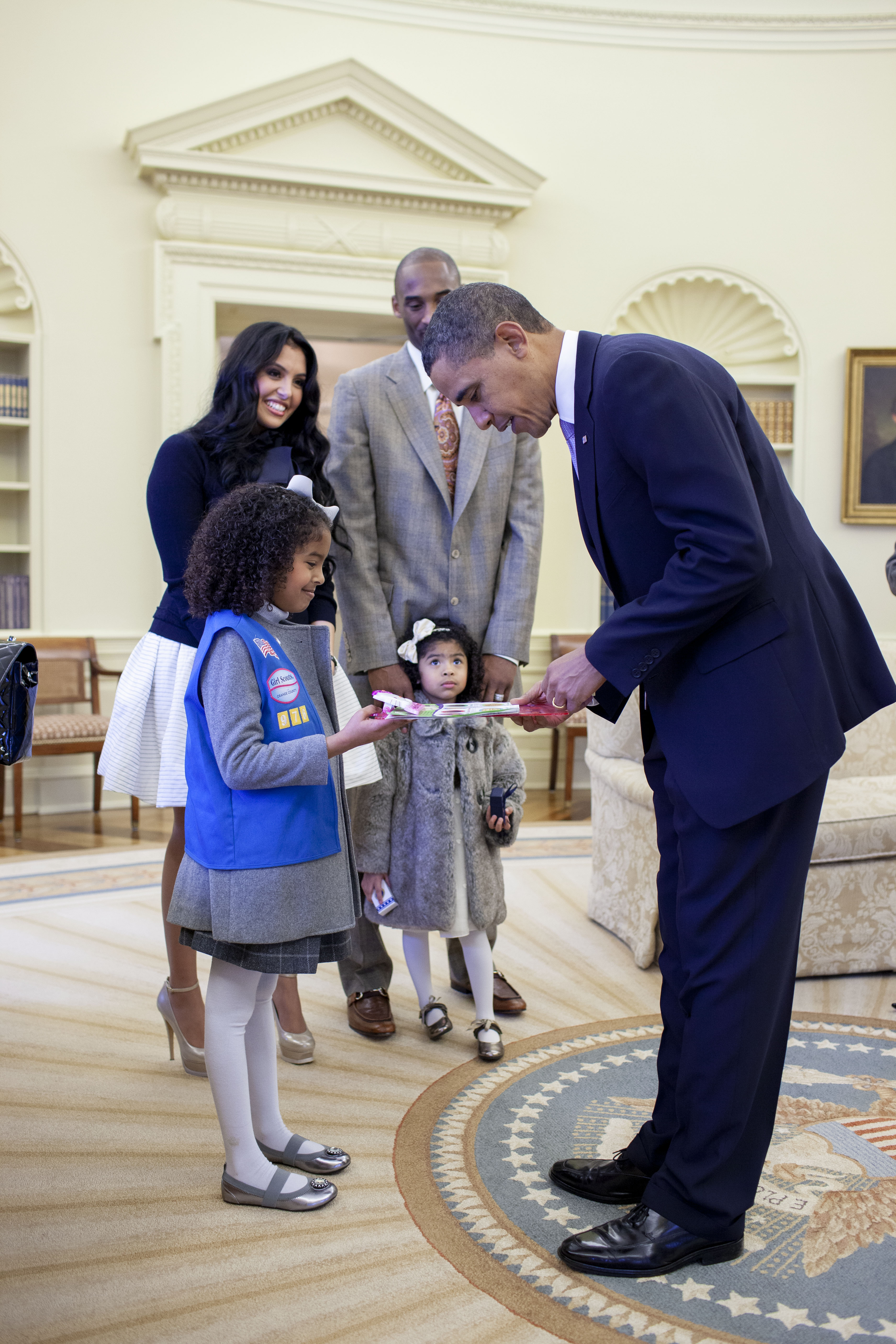
The Bryants and former U.S. president Barack Obama, in the Oval Office in 2010

In November 1999, 17-year-old Bryant was working as a background dancer for Tha Eastsidaz rap music video "G'd Up" when she met Kobe Bryant, who was on set working on a rap album. Six months after meeting, the couple were engaged. Her engagement ring included a seven-carat diamond. They married on April 18, 2001. The wedding was attended by approximately twelve people and was held in Dana Point, California, at the St. Edward the Confessor Catholic Church; the wedding was not attended by Kobe's parents, two sisters, longtime advisor and agent, or teammates. After the marriage, she changed her name to Vanessa Marie Bryant. They had four children: Natalia Diamante (born January 2003), Gianna "Gigi" Maria-Onore (May 1, 2006 – January 26, 2020), Bianka Bella (born December 2016), and Capri Kobe (born June 2019).

Bryant's husband admitted to cheating on her with multiple women during his 2003 sexual assault case. Bryant defended him, stating: "I know my husband made the mistake of adultery". A few days later, she received a $4 million eight-carat purple diamond ring leading to speculation that this was a gift for her support. Kobe reportedly had commissioned the ring two weeks prior.

In 2004, Bryant accused Lakers player Karl Malone of acting inappropriately towards her. Malone later apologized while denying making a pass at her. Sports Illustrated published a story titled "Vanessa-gate," and she was the subject of a Saturday Night Live parody. Critics called her a drama queen, while others applauded her for challenging the NBA culture of tomcatting.

In 2009, Vanessa's housekeeper Maria Jimenez sued the Bryants, alleging that Vanessa badgered, harassed and humiliated her while she worked at their Newport Coast home from 2007 to 2008. Vanessa allegedly forced Jimenez to stick her hand in a bag of dog feces to retrieve a price tag as punishment for putting a $690 Gucci blouse in the washing machine and routinely called her “lazy, slow, dumb, a fucking liar and fucking shit,” among other abuses. The Bryants denied those allegations and counter-sued Jimenez, alleging that she breached a confidentiality agreement. The Bryants settled the suit in 2010, paying an undisclosed amount to Jimenez.

During a 2010 Lakers game against the Phoenix Suns, Bryant wore a t-shirt that read "Do I Look Illegal?” in protest against the Arizona SB 1070 Immigration Law, which critics said sought to make life difficult for illegal immigrants living in the country. In 2025, Bryant spoke out against the mass deportations of illegal immigrants, identifying as a "proud Mexican American."

In December 2011, Vanessa filed for divorce from Kobe, citing irreconcilable differences and sparked speculation about the possible distribution of assets in a divorce. Thirteen months later, the Bryants called off the divorce. In 2016, David Wharton and Nathan Fenno of the Los Angeles Times described Vanessa as a contradictory and "at times polarizing public figure".

In 2012, Bryant faced public backlash and was called a gold digger when she said in a New York Magazine interview: "I certainly would not want to be married to somebody that can’t win championships. If you’re sacrificing time away from my family and myself for the benefit of winning championships, then winning a championship should happen every single year."

In December 2020, Vanessa's mother Sofia Urbieta Laine filed a lawsuit against her for fraud, alleging she had worked for years without pay as a “personal assistant and nanny” and that Kobe had promised to support her financially before his death in January. Vanessa reportedly kicked her mother out of her home and took away her car, according to a Univision interview. The lawsuit was settled in 2021.

Bryant has numerous tattoos: "Mambacita" on her right arm, the names of herself and five family members on her right foot, and messages on her neck, shoulder, and wrist.

== 2020 helicopter crash and subsequent litigation ==
On January 26, 2020, Bryant's husband, Kobe, and their daughter Gianna died in the Calabasas helicopter crash. She sued Los Angeles County for invasion of privacy and negligence after employees of the Sheriff's Office and Fire Department took photos of the victims of the crash and improperly shared them. The case went to trial and, in August 2022, she was awarded $16 million in damages. In February 2023, the county settled the case with Bryant and her daughters, with the county agreeing to pay $28.85 million (including the approximate $15 million awarded to her in the previous year and additional funds to settle potential claims from her daughters). Vanessa Bryant said she would donate the lawsuit proceeds to the Mamba and Mambacita Sports Foundation.

On February 24, 2020, Bryant sued the estate of the late pilot as well as the helicopter company, Island Express.
