= NBA Courtside 2 Featuring Kobe Bryant =

1999 basketball video game

- Cover art of the Nintendo 64 version
- Developer: Left Field Productions
- Publisher: Nintendo
- Producer: James Maxwell
- Programmer: John Brandwood
- Artist: Robert Hemphill (Game Boy Color)
- Composer: Chris Lamb
- Series: NBA Courtside
- Platforms: Nintendo 64, Game Boy Color
- Release: Nintendo 64: NA: November 8, 1999; Game Boy Color: NA: December 7, 1999
- Genre: Sports
- Modes: Single-player, multiplayer

NBA Courtside 2 Featuring Kobe Bryant is a 1999 basketball video game developed by Left Field Productions and published by Nintendo for the Nintendo 64 exclusively in North America. It is the sequel to Kobe Bryant in NBA Courtside and features NBA star Kobe Bryant on its cover. Bryant also performed the motion capture for the game.

A Game Boy Color companion title was released at the same time, entitled NBA 3 on 3 featuring Kobe Bryant.

The third and final edition in the Courtside series, NBA Courtside 2002 was released for the GameCube in 2002.

== Gameplay ==
This game features rosters from the 1999–2000 NBA season. The ability to play multiple seasons has been added. New features include the ability to play a three-point contest and additional options for creating a player from scratch. The game features improved artificial intelligence helps to improve the realism of the gameplay.

New dunk styles are possible to implement and enhanced motion capturing allows the no-look pass to be used during gameplay. There are more than 300 players and games can either be a realistic simulation of actual NBA action or a full-blown arcade experience. Plays such as the isolation play, the post up, and the triangle offense can be called.

== Reception ==
Reception

Aggregate score
Aggregator	Score	
Aggregator	GBC	N64
GameRankings	69%	76%

Review scores
Publication	Score	
Publication	GBC	N64
AllGame	3.5/5	3.5/5
Electronic Gaming Monthly	N/A	8.25/10
Game Informer	N/A	7.25/10
GameFan	N/A	85%
GameSpot	N/A	7.1/10
IGN	6/10	9.2/10
N64 Magazine	N/A	87%
Nintendo Power	6.6/10	7.9/10

NBA Courtside 2 received "favorable" reviews, while NBA 3 on 3 received "average" reviews, according to the review aggregation website GameRankings.
