= Kobe Bryant =

American basketball player (1978–2020)

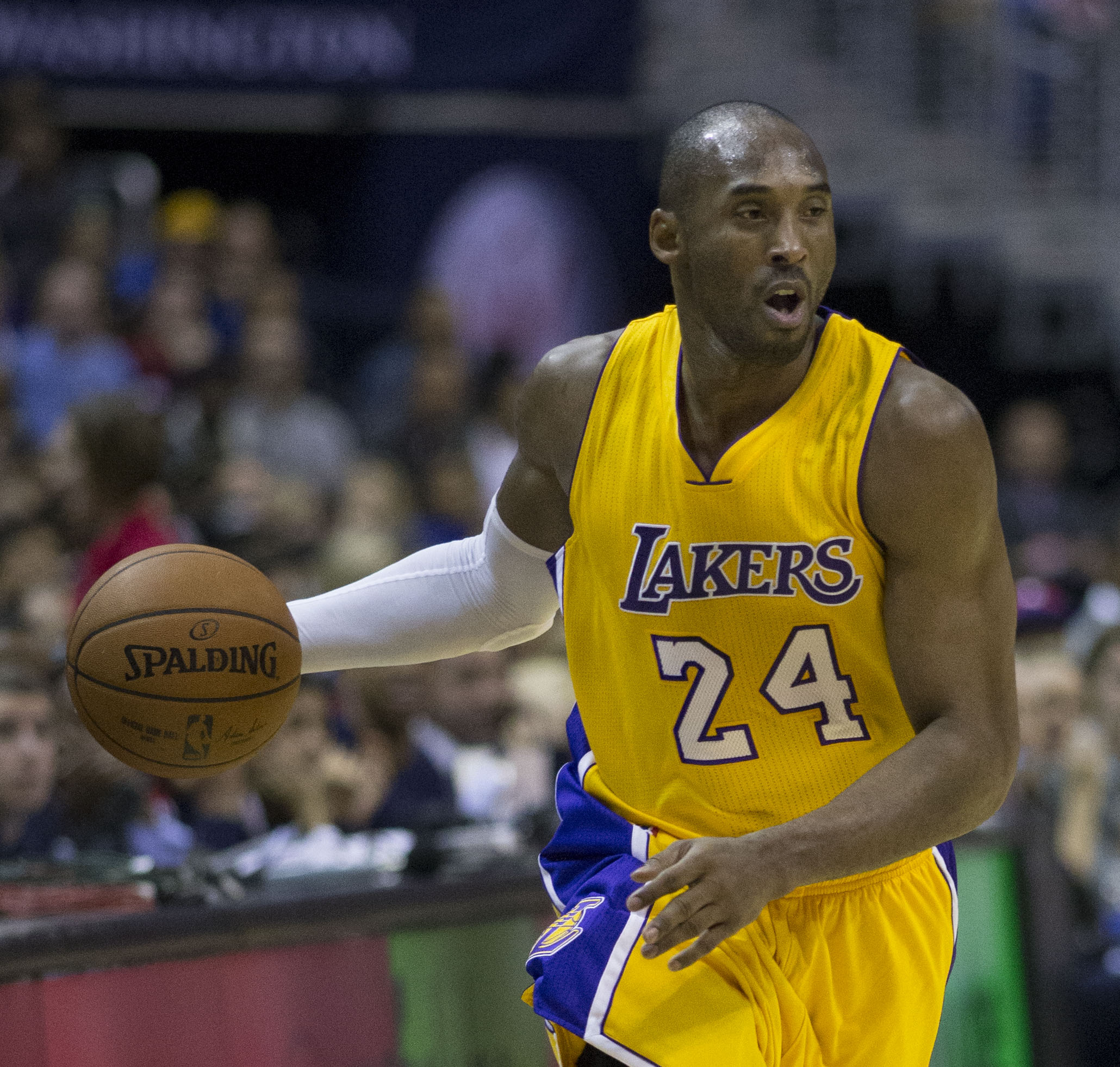
- Bryant with the Los Angeles Lakers in 2014

Personal information
- Born: August 23, 1978 Philadelphia, Pennsylvania, U.S.
- Died: January 26, 2020 (aged 41) Calabasas, California, U.S.
- Listed height: 6 ft 6 in (1.98 m) (Note: In 2017, Vanessa Bryant said that Kobe was 6 feet 4 3/4 inches (1.95 m) without shoes and 6 feet 6 inches (1.98 m) with shoes. In 2006, Bryant said that he was 6 feet 4 inches (1.93 m). In 2008, he stated he was "probably" 6 feet 5 inches (1.96 m) in shoes.)
- Listed weight: 212 lb (96 kg)

Career information
- High school: Lower Merion (Ardmore, Pennsylvania)
- NBA draft: 1996: 1st round, 13th overall pick
- Drafted by: Charlotte Hornets
- Playing career: 1996–2016
- Position: Shooting guard
- Number: 8, 24

Career history
- 1996–2016: Los Angeles Lakers

Career highlights
- 5× NBA champion (2000–2002, 2009, 2010); 2× NBA Finals MVP (2009, 2010); NBA Most Valuable Player (2008); 18× NBA All-Star (1998, 2000–2016); 4× NBA All-Star Game MVP (2002, 2007, 2009, (Note: co-MVP along with Shaquille O'Neal) 2011); 11× All-NBA First Team (2002–2004, 2006–2013); 2× All-NBA Second Team (2000, 2001); 2× All-NBA Third Team (1999, 2005); 9× NBA All-Defensive First Team (2000, 2003, 2004, 2006–2011); 3× NBA All-Defensive Second Team (2001, 2002, 2012); 2× NBA scoring champion (2006, 2007); NBA Slam Dunk Contest champion (1997); NBA All-Rookie Second Team (1997); NBA 75th Anniversary Team; Nos. 8 & 24 retired by Los Angeles Lakers; National high school player of the year (1996); McDonald's All-American (1996); First-team Parade All-American (1996); Fourth-team Parade All-American (1995)

Career statistics
- Points: 33,643 (25.0 ppg)
- Rebounds: 7,047 (5.2 rpg)
- Assists: 6,306 (4.7 apg)
- Stats at NBA.com
- Stats at Basketball Reference
- Basketball Hall of Fame
Medals
Men's basketball
Representing the United States
Olympic Games
Gold medal – first place	2008 Beijing	Team
Gold medal – first place	2012 London	Team
FIBA Americas Championship
Gold medal – first place	2007 Las Vegas	Team

Kobe Bean Bryant (Note: Pronunciation of "Kobe": /ˈkoʊ.bi/, KOH-bee) (August 23, 1978 – January 26, 2020) was an American professional basketball player. Nicknamed "the Black Mamba", he played his entire 20-year career with the Los Angeles Lakers in the National Basketball Association (NBA). Bryant was a five-time NBA champion, a two-time NBA Finals MVP, the 2008 NBA MVP, and a two-time gold medal recipient on the 2008 and 2012 U.S. Olympic teams. Bryant is widely regarded as one of the greatest basketball players of all time. (Note: Attributed to multiple references:)

The son of NBA player Joe Bryant and his wife Pam, he was born in Philadelphia and spent part of his childhood in Italy. Bryant played high school basketball at Lower Merion High School outside of Philadelphia. He opted out of college basketball and declared for the 1996 NBA draft. He was selected by the Charlotte Hornets with the 13th pick; he was then traded to the Lakers. Following his rookie season, he earned NBA All-Rookie Second Team honors and won the 1997 Slam Dunk Contest. He was named an All-Star in his second season. He had a feud with teammate Shaquille O'Neal that was well-documented. Nevertheless, the pair led the Lakers to three consecutive NBA championships from 2000 to 2002. In 2003, Bryant was charged with sexual assault; the criminal charges were ultimately dismissed. In a related lawsuit, he settled out of court and issued an apology while maintaining that the encounter was consensual.

After the Lakers lost the 2004 NBA Finals, O'Neal was traded and Bryant became the franchise's centerpiece. He led the NBA in scoring in the 2005–06 and 2006–07 seasons. On January 22, 2006, Bryant scored a career-high 81 points, the third most in an NBA game. He adopted the nickname Black Mamba during this time. Bryant won the 2008 NBA Most Valuable Player (MVP) Award, but lost the NBA Finals that same season. He followed the defeat by leading the Lakers to consecutive championships in 2009 and 2010, and was named NBA Finals MVP both times. His remaining playing career was hampered by injuries and reduced playing time. He retired after the 2015–16 season. In 2017, the Lakers retired both his jersey numbers: 8 and 24, making him the only NBA player to have multiple numbers retired by one franchise. In 2018, Bryant won the Academy Award for Best Animated Short Film for Dear Basketball (2017).

Bryant was a 15-time member of the All-NBA Team, 12-time member of the All-Defensive Team, and two-time scoring champion. He ranks fourth in league all-time regular season and postseason scoring. He is the Lakers' all-time leading scorer and the NBA's first guard to play 20 seasons. His 18 All-Star designations are the third most ever, and his four NBA All-Star Game MVP Awards tied Bob Pettit's record.

In January 2020, Bryant and his 13-year-old daughter Gianna were among nine people killed in a helicopter crash in Calabasas, California. Tributes and memorials followed his death, including murals throughout Los Angeles, Kobe Bryant Day (8/24), and two statues outside Crypto.com Arena. The NBA All-Star Game MVP was also renamed in Bryant's honor. Bryant was posthumously named to the NBA 75th Anniversary Team in 2021 and was a two-time inductee to the Naismith Memorial Basketball Hall of Fame, once in 2020 for his individual career, and in 2025 as part of the 2008 United States men's Olympic basketball team ("Redeem Team").

== Early life ==
Kobe Bean Bryant was born on August 23, 1978, in Philadelphia, Pennsylvania. His mother, Pam Bryant (née Cox), is the sister of basketball player Chubby Cox, and his father, Joe Bryant, played eight seasons in the NBA. His father named him after the Kobe beef from Japan, which he saw on a restaurant menu, whereas his middle name, Bean, was derived from his father's nickname "Jellybean". He had two older sisters: Sharia and Shaya. He was raised Catholic. He was fluent in English, Italian, and Spanish. The Lakers were his favorite team when he was growing up. He was also a fan of the New York Mets, wanting to be like Darryl Strawberry, and his hometown NFL team, the Philadelphia Eagles.

When his father was traded from the Philadelphia 76ers to the then-San Diego Clippers, Bryant and the family moved to San Diego in 1979. His mother said he first showed an interest in basketball at the age of three. He would watch his father play basketball on TV and pretended to be a part of the game. He attended preschool at the Gillispie School in La Jolla where he played basketball on the playground. His father played his final season in the NBA with the Houston Rockets in the 1983 NBA season.

=== Years in Italy ===
When Bryant was six years old, his father retired from the NBA and moved his family to Rieti, Italy to continue his professional basketball career for the team AMG Sebastiani Rieti. After two years, they moved to Reggio Calabria, then to Pistoia and Reggio Emilia. He became accustomed to his new lifestyle and learned to speak fluent Italian. He was especially fond of Reggio Emilia, which he described as a loving place and the source of some of his fondest childhood memories. It was there that he began to take basketball seriously. His grandfather mailed him videos of NBA games for him to study. He also watched European films about sports, from which he learned more about basketball.

From 1987 to 1989, Bryant's father played for Olimpia Basket Pistoia where he paired with former Detroit Pistons player Leon Douglas. Bryant worked at the games as a ball and mop boy and practiced shooting during halftime. Douglas recalled, "At every one of our games at halftime, it was the Kobe show. He'd get out there and get his shot up. We'd come out of the locker room at halftime and have to chase him off the court". During the summer, he returned to the United States to play in a basketball summer league. He also played soccer while living in Italy, and A.C. Milan was his favorite team.

=== High school ===
Bryant's retired No. 33 jersey and banner at the Lower Merion High School gym in Ardmore, Pennsylvania

When he was 13, Bryant and his family moved back to Philadelphia, where he enrolled in the eighth grade at Bala Cynwyd Middle School and then Lower Merion High School in Ardmore, Pennsylvania. He earned national recognition for his play at Lower Merion. He played on the varsity team as a freshman, but the team finished with a 4–20 record. The following three years, Lower Merion compiled a 77–13 record, with Bryant playing all five positions.

During his junior year, he averaged 31.1 points, 10.4 rebounds, 5.2 assists, 3.8 blocks and 2.3 steals, and was named a fourth-team Parade All-American. He considered playing collegiate basketball at Duke, Michigan, North Carolina and Villanova. His skills and SAT score of 1080 would have ensured admission to any college, but he did not officially visit campuses. At the ABCD Camp, Bryant earned the 1995 senior MVP award while playing alongside future NBA teammate Lamar Odom. While in high school, then 76ers coach John Lucas invited Bryant to work out and scrimmage with the team, where he played one-on-one with Jerry Stackhouse.

As a senior, Bryant led Lower Merion to their first state championship in 53 years. During his senior year, he averaged 30.8 points, 12 rebounds, 6.5 assists, 4 steals, and 3.8 blocked shots in leading the school to a 31–3 record. He finished his high-school career as Southeastern Pennsylvania's all-time leading scorer at 2,883 points, surpassing both Wilt Chamberlain and Lionel Simmons. As a senior, he was named Naismith High School Player of the Year, Gatorade Men's National Basketball Player of the Year, a McDonald's All-American, a first-team Parade All-American and a USA Today All-USA First Team player. His coach, Greg Downer, commented that he was "a complete player who dominates" and praised his work ethic. He was later honored as one of the 35 Greatest McDonald's All-Americans for his high school play.

== Professional career ==
Bryant decided to forgo college basketball and entered the lottery for 1996 NBA draft, the sixth player and the first guard to do so. His announcement garnered publicity when prep-to-pro was rare. The day before the draft, the Charlotte Hornets agreed to trade their No.13 pick to the Lakers in exchange for Vlade Divac. Before the agreement, the Hornets had never considered drafting Bryant. During the draft, the Lakers told the Hornets to select Bryant minutes before the pick was made. Lakers General Manager Jerry West made the trade for Bryant, after having watched him work out in Los Angeles. After the draft, the trade was put in jeopardy when Divac threatened to retire, but he relented and the trade was finalized. Since he was a minor, his parents had to co-sign his $3.5 million three-year rookie contract. Bryant debuted in the Summer Pro League in Long Beach, California. Defenders struggled to get in front of him. He finished with averages of 24.5 points and 5.3 rebounds in the summer league.

=== Early years (1996–1999) ===
As a rookie in 1996–97, he became the second-youngest player ever to play in an NBA game (18 years, 72 days) and eventually became the youngest NBA starter (18 years, 158 days). He mostly came off the bench behind guards Eddie Jones and Nick Van Exel. He played limited minutes, but as the season continued, his playing time grew. During the All-Star weekend, he participated in the Rookie Challenge and won the 1997 Slam Dunk Contest, the youngest dunk champion at age 18. The Lakers advanced to the Western Conference semifinals in the 1997 NBA playoffs against the Utah Jazz. He was pressed into a lead role at the end of Game 5. Byron Scott missed the game with a sprained wrist, Robert Horry was ejected for fighting with Jeff Hornacek, and O'Neal fouled out with 1:46 remaining. He missed a game-winning shot in the fourth quarter, then misfired three three-point field goals in overtime, including two tying shots in the final minute. O'Neal commented that "[Bryant] was the only guy who had the guts at the time to take shots like that." His rookie campaign earned him a spot on the NBA All-Rookie Second Team.

In his second season, he received more playing time. His scoring averages more than doubled, from 7.6 to 15.4. Playing time increased when the Lakers "played small", which positioned Bryant as a small forward alongside the guards he usually played behind. Bryant was runner-up for the NBA's Sixth Man of the Year Award, and through fan voting, became the NBA's youngest All-Star starter. Bryant was joined by teammates O'Neal, Van Exel, and Jones, making it the first time since 1983 that four players on one team were selected to play in an All-Star Game. Bryant's 15.4 points per game was the highest of any non-starter in the season.

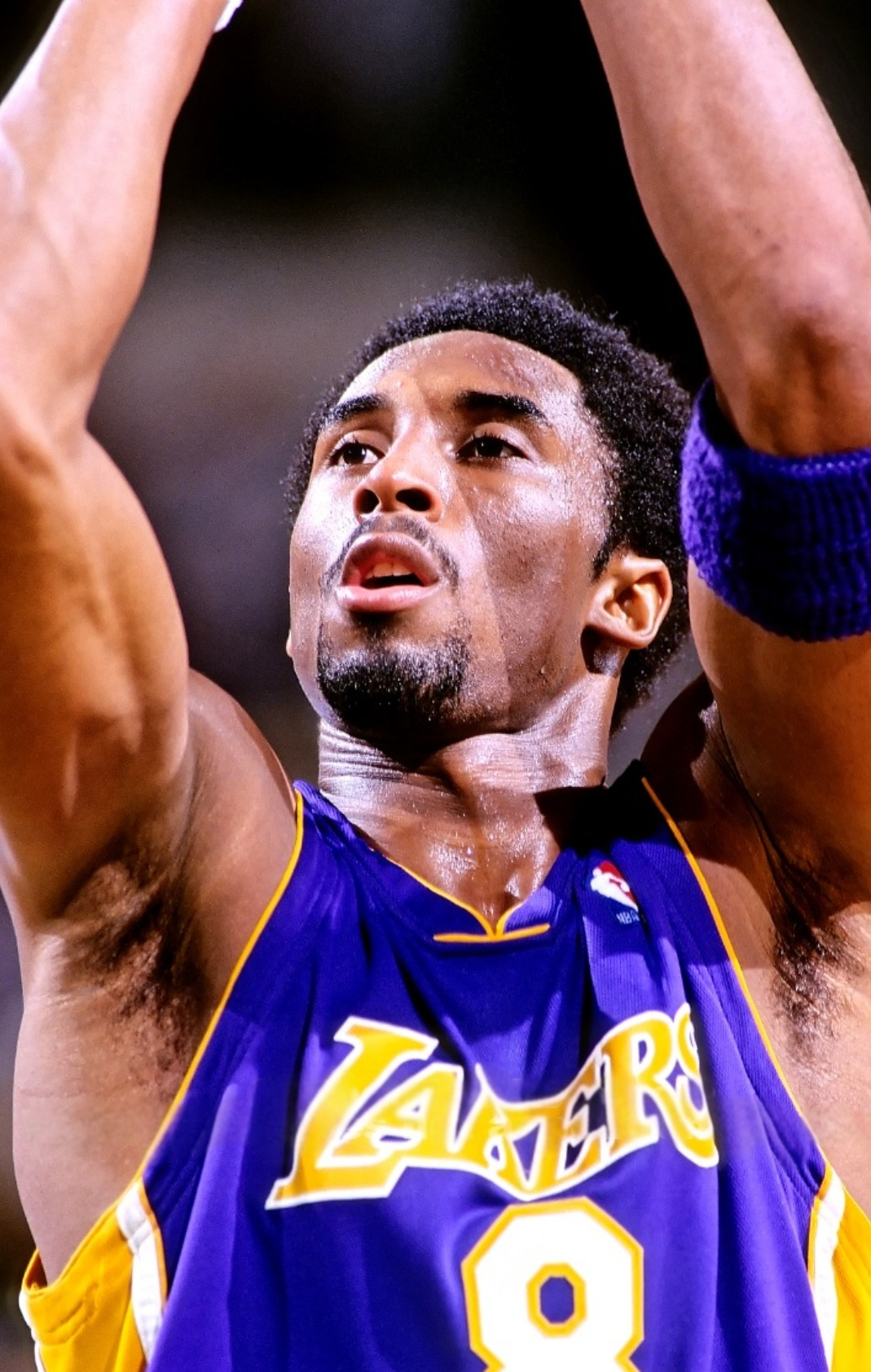
Bryant, nicknamed 'Frobe' for his early-career afro hairstyle, December 1999

The 1998–99 season marked Bryant's emergence as a premier guard. He started every game for the lockout-shortened 50-game season. He signed a six-year $70 million contract extension, keeping him a Laker through 2003–04. Sportswriters compared his skills to Michael Jordan and Magic Johnson. The Lakers made the playoffs, where they were swept by the eventual champion San Antonio Spurs in the Western Conference Semifinals.

=== Three-peat (1999–2002) ===
Bryant's play improved when Phil Jackson was hired in 1999. Jackson applied his triangle offense that he had developed for the Chicago Bulls.

Bryant was sidelined for six weeks prior to the start of the 1999–2000 season due to a preseason hand injury. When he returned, he played over 38 minutes a game and improved in all statistical categories. This included leading the team in assists and steals per game. O'Neal and Bryant, backed with a strong bench, led the Lakers to win 67 games. For his season, Bryant was named to the All-NBA Second Team and All-NBA Defensive Team for the first time (the youngest to receive All-Defensive honors). In the 2000 NBA playoffs, he had some stellar performances, including a 25-point, 11-rebound, seven-assist, four-block in Game 7 of the Western Conference Finals against the Portland Trail Blazers. He threw an alley-oop to O'Neal to clinch the game and a trip to the Finals.

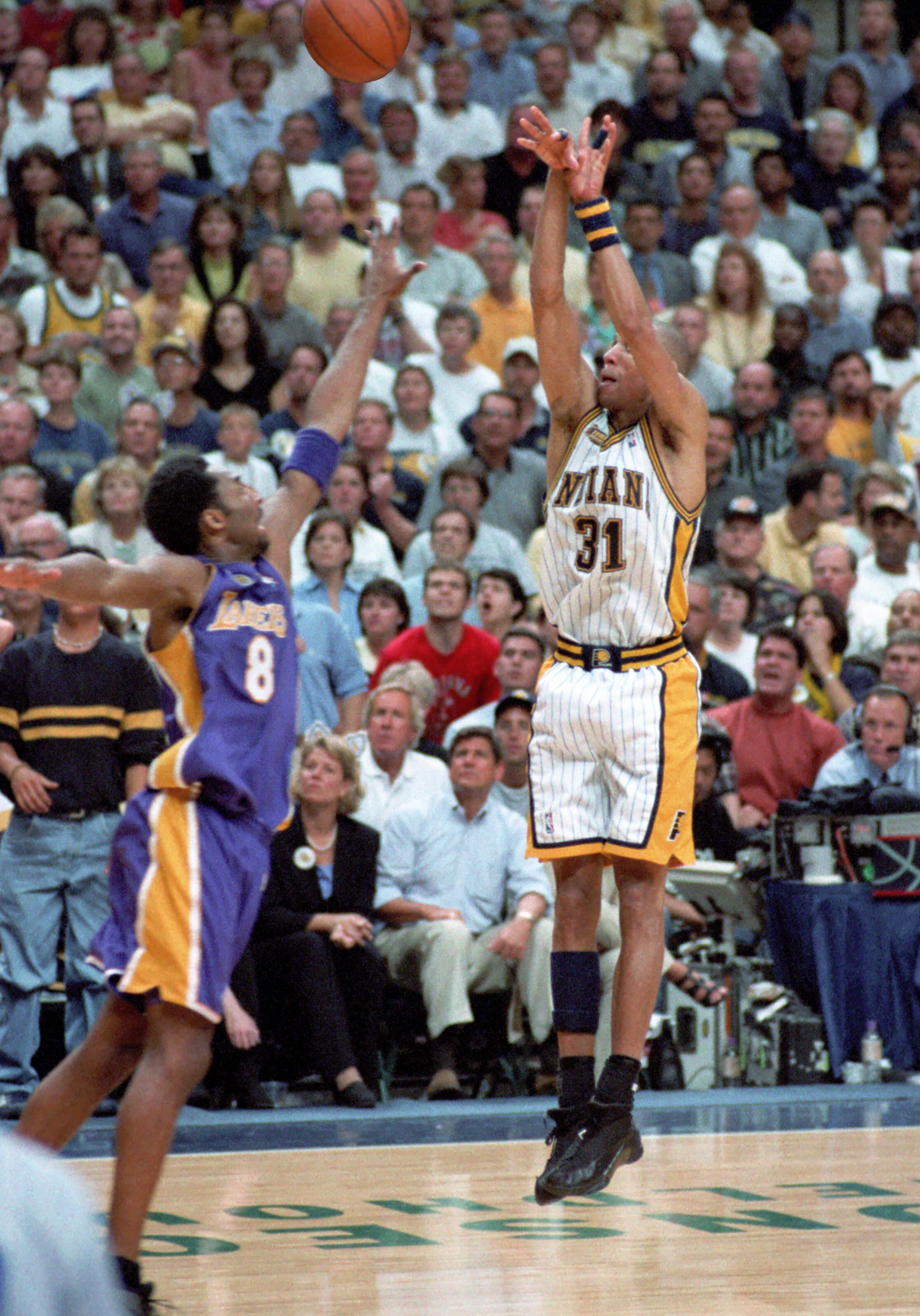
Bryant contests a shot by Reggie Miller during Game 5 of the 2000 NBA Finals

In the 2000 Finals, against the Indiana Pacers, Bryant injured his ankle in Game 2 after landing on Jalen Rose's foot. Rose admitted he placed his foot under Bryant intentionally. Bryant did not return, and missed Game 3. In Game 4, Bryant scored 22 in the second half and led the team to victory as O'Neal fouled out. Bryant scored the winner to put the Lakers ahead 120–118. With a 116–111 victory in Game 6, the Lakers won their first championship since the 1988 NBA Finals.

In the 2000–01 season, he increased his points per game to 28.5. The Shaq–Kobe feud surfaced. Bryant led the team in assists, with five per game. However, the Lakers only won 56 games, an 11-game drop from the previous year. The team responded by going 15–1 in the playoffs. They swept the Portland Trail Blazers in the first round, and the Sacramento Kings in the conference semifinals. In Game 4 against the Kings, Bryant notched 48 points, 16 rebounds, and three assists in a 119–113 series-clinching victory. They swept the San Antonio Spurs in the Conference Finals, before losing their first game against Allen Iverson and the Philadelphia 76ers in the 2001 NBA Finals. The Lakers won the next four and their second championship. He played heavy minutes lifting his game stats to 29.4 points, 7.3 rebounds, and 6.1 assists. Bryant earned All-NBA Second Team and All-NBA Defensive Team again. He was named a starter for the All-Star Game for the third year in a row.

Bryant and the 2001 NBA champion Los Angeles Lakers with President George W. Bush at the White House

In the 2001–02 season, Bryant played 80 games for the first time. On January 14, 2002, Bryant recorded a then career-high 56 points, with five rebounds, in a 120–81 victory over the visiting Memphis Grizzlies. He averaged 25.2 points, 5.5 rebounds, and 5.5 assists. He had a career-high 46.9% shooting percentage and led his team in assists. He claimed his first All-Star MVP trophy after a 31-point performance in Philadelphia, where he was booed by fans throughout the game, stemming from his comment to a 76ers heckler during the Finals that the Lakers were "going to cut your hearts out." The Lakers won 58 games that year and finished second in the Pacific Division behind the Sacramento Kings. Bryant was suspended for one game after he punched Reggie Miller of the Indiana Pacers. He was named to the All-NBA First Team for the first time.

The road to the 2002 NBA Finals was much tougher. While they swept the Blazers and defeated the Spurs 4–1 in the first two rounds, the Lakers did not have home-court advantage against the Kings. The series stretched to seven games, the first time for the Lakers since the 2000 Western Conference Finals. However, the Lakers dominated and made their third consecutive NBA Finals, in which Bryant averaged 26.8 points, 51.4% shooting, 5.8 rebounds, 5.3 assists, scoring a quarter of the team's points. The Lakers swept the New Jersey Nets in the Finals. Bryant became the youngest player, at age 23, to win three championships. He was praised for his performance in fourth quarters, specifically the last two rounds.

=== Title defenses and struggles (2002–2005) ===
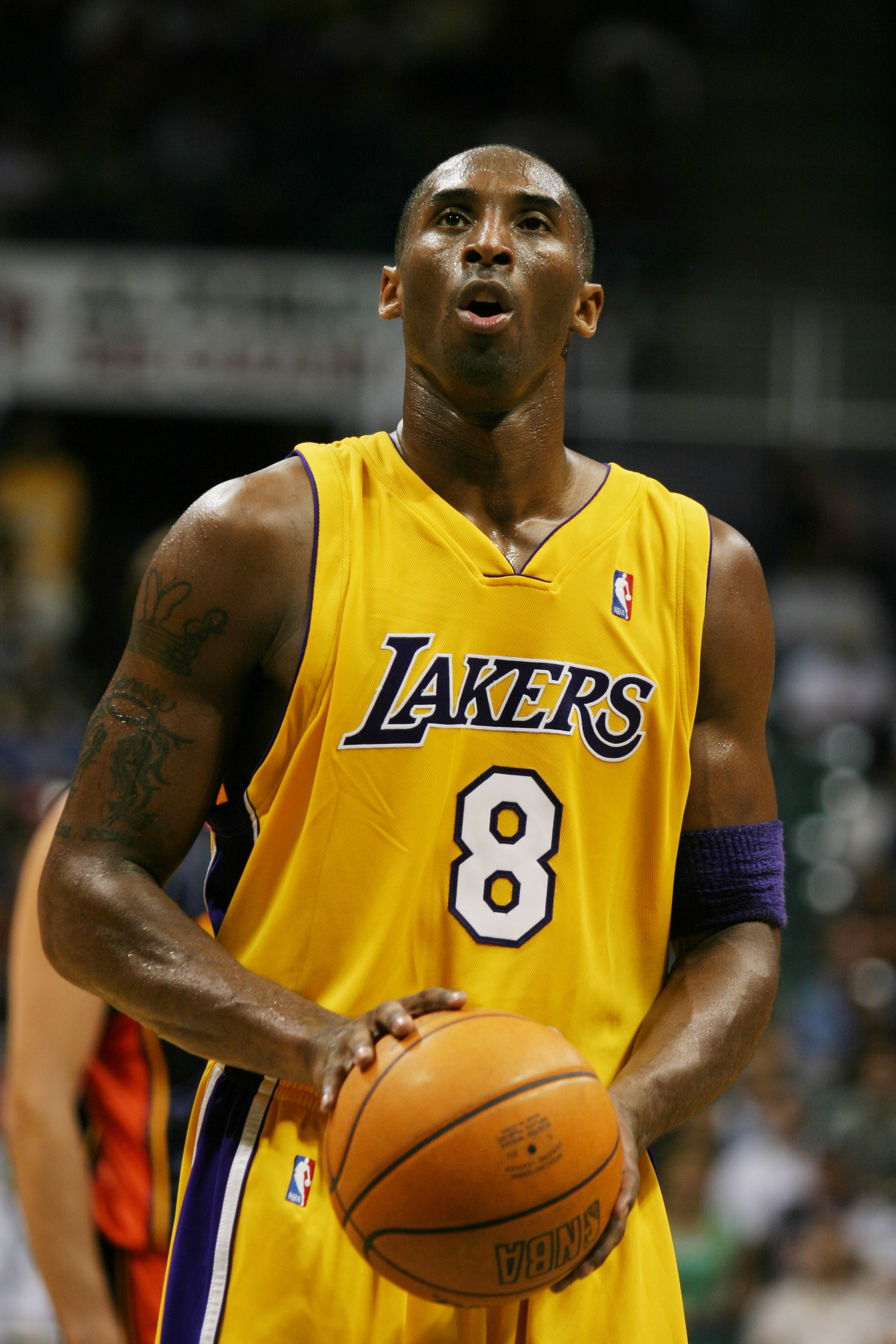
Bryant attempting a free-throw during a 2005 pre-season game

Bryant had one of his best individual seasons during the 2002–03 season. He broke an NBA record for three-pointers on January 7, 2003, when he made 12 against the Seattle SuperSonics. He averaged 30 points and embarked on a historic run, posting 40 or more points in nine consecutive games while averaging 40.6 in February. He also averaged career-high 6.9 rebounds, 5.9 assists, and 2.2 steals. He was once again voted to both the All-NBA and All-Defensive First Teams, and came in third for the MVP award. After finishing 50–32 in the regular season, the Lakers floundered in the playoffs and lost in the semifinals in six games to the eventual champions San Antonio Spurs. In 2003, he was arrested for alleged sexual assault ahead of the 2003–04 season. This caused him to miss some games due to court appearances.

The 2003–04 NBA season brought the Lakers back to the Finals, but tension within the team was exposed. In the final game of the regular season, Bryant made two buzzer-beaters to win the game and the Pacific Division title. The Lakers advanced to the 2004 NBA Finals, where they lost to the Detroit Pistons in five games. Bryant averaged 22.6 points and 4.4 assists while shooting 35.1%. Jackson's contract as coach was not renewed, and Rudy Tomjanovich took over. O'Neal was traded to the Miami Heat for Lamar Odom, Caron Butler, and Brian Grant. Bryant signed a seven-year, $136.4 million contract.

Bryant was closely scrutinized during the 2004–05 season. His reputation had been damaged from the prior year's events. A particularly damaging salvo came when Jackson wrote The Last Season: A Team in Search of Its Soul where he wrote that Bryant was "un-coachable". Midway through the season, Tomjanovich resigned and Frank Hamblen took over. Bryant was the league's second-leading scorer at 27.6 points. The Lakers went 34–48 and missed the playoffs for the first time in a decade. Bryant did not make the NBA All-Defensive Team and made only the All-NBA Third Team. Bryant engaged in public feuds with Karl Malone and Ray Allen.

=== Scoring records (2005–2007) ===
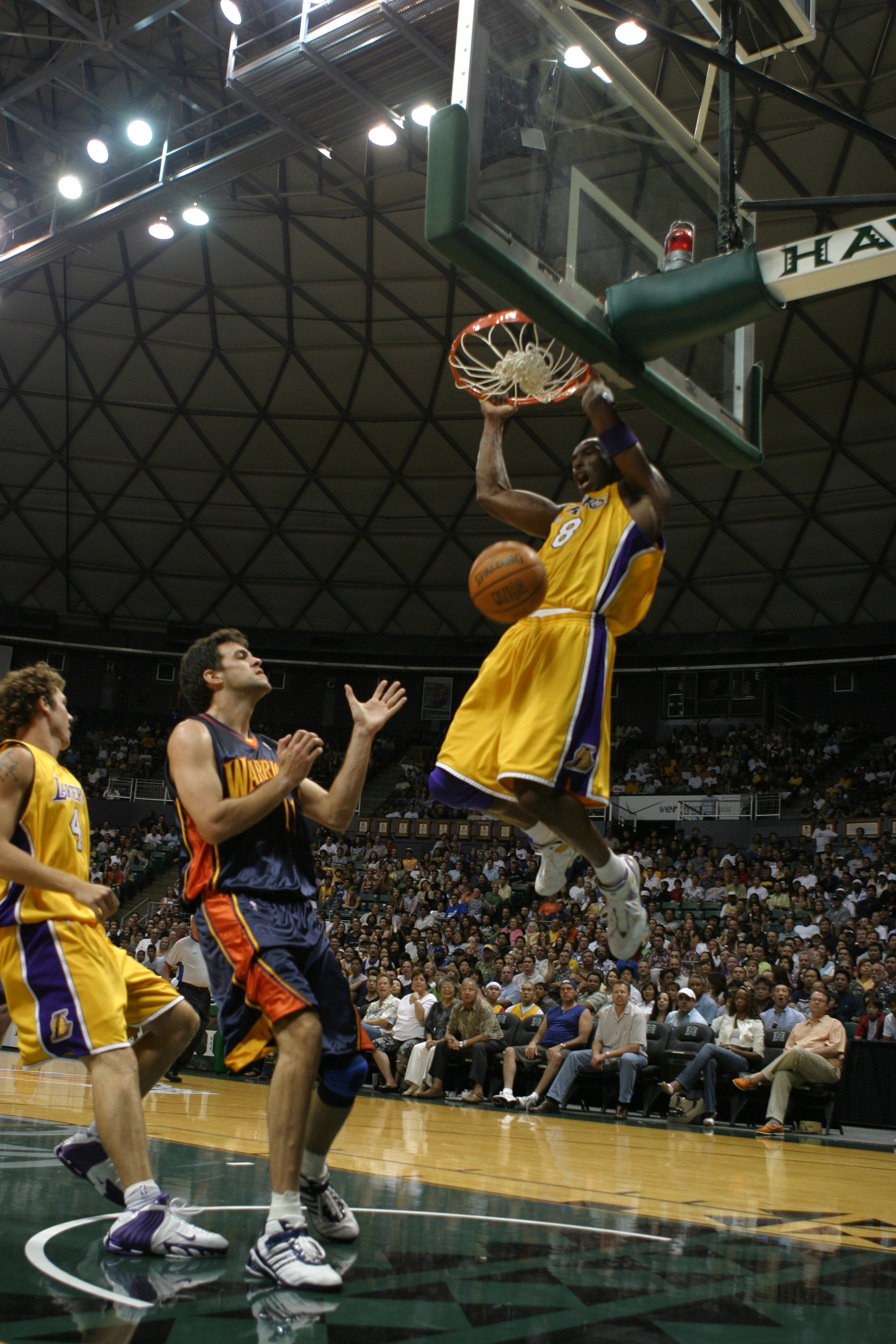
Bryant dunking against the Golden State Warriors during a preseason game in Honolulu, Hawaii, in October 2005

Despite their differences, Jackson returned to coach the Lakers. Bryant endorsed the move, and they worked well together and the Lakers returned to the 2006 NBA playoffs. Bryant forged his finest statistical season and set numerous records. On December 20, 2005, Bryant scored 62 points in three quarters against the Dallas Mavericks. Entering the fourth quarter, he had outscored the Mavericks team 62–61, the only time a player had done this through three quarters since the introduction of the shot clock. Bryant and O'Neal were friendly during the season and showed a pause in their feud.

On January 22, 2006, Bryant scored a career-high 81 points in a 122–104 victory over the Toronto Raptors. In addition to breaking the Elgin Baylor franchise record of 71, Bryant's feat was the second-best in NBA history, behind only Wilt Chamberlain's 100-point game. He also became the first player since 1964 to score 45 points or more in four consecutive games, joining Chamberlain and Baylor. For January, he averaged 43.4 points per game, the eighth highest for a single month, behind only Chamberlain.

After the 2005–06 season, he set single-season franchise records for most 40-point games (27) and most points scored (2,832). He won the scoring title for the first time, averaging 35.4, the fifth player to average 35+ in a season. (Note: He joined Chamberlain (5 times), Baylor, Rick Barry and Jordan (2) in averaging over 35 points.) Bryant finished fourth in the voting for the 2006 MVP Award but received 22 first place votes—second only to winner Steve Nash. In the first playoff round, the Lakers reached a 3–1 lead over the Phoenix Suns, culminating with his overtime-forcing and game-winning shots in Game 4. Despite Bryant's 27.9 points per game, the Lakers fell to the Suns in seven games. After scoring 50 points on 20 of 35 shooting in a Game 6 loss, he was criticized for taking only three shots in the second half of the 121–90 Game 7.

Bryant, who switched to jersey No. 24, shooting over DeShawn Stevenson in 2007

Bryant changed his jersey number from 8 to 24 at the start of the 2006–07 season to match his first high-school number. Bryant said he had wanted 24 as a rookie, but it was George McCloud's. Bryant wore 143 at the Adidas ABCD camp and chose 8 by adding those digits. During the 2006–07 season, he earned his second All-Star MVP trophy. In March 2007, Bryant scored a season-high 65 points against the Blazers, ending a seven-game losing streak, his second-best scoring performance. The following game, he recorded 50 points against the Timberwolves, after which he scored 60 points in a road win against the Memphis Grizzlies—becoming the second Laker to score three straight 50-plus point games, a feat not seen since Jordan in 1987. The only other Laker to do so was Baylor. The next day, in a game against the Hornets, Bryant scored 50 points, making him the second player to have four straight 50-point games (behind Chamberlain, who achieved it twice with streaks of five and seven). He finished the year with a total of 10 50-plus point games, surpassed only by Chamberlain. (Note: Chamberlain had 50 points 45 times in 1961–62 and 30 in 1962–63.) Bryant won his second straight scoring title that season. Throughout 2006–07, Bryant's jersey became the top seller in the US and China. Journalists attributed improved sales to Bryant's new number, as well as his All-Star performance. In the 2007 NBA playoffs, the Lakers were defeated in the first round again by the Suns, 4–1. In May 2007 Bryant stated his desire for Jerry West's return, but denied wanting to be traded otherwise. However, days later, he said "I want to be traded." He later backed off his trade request.

=== MVP season and Finals loss (2007–2008) ===
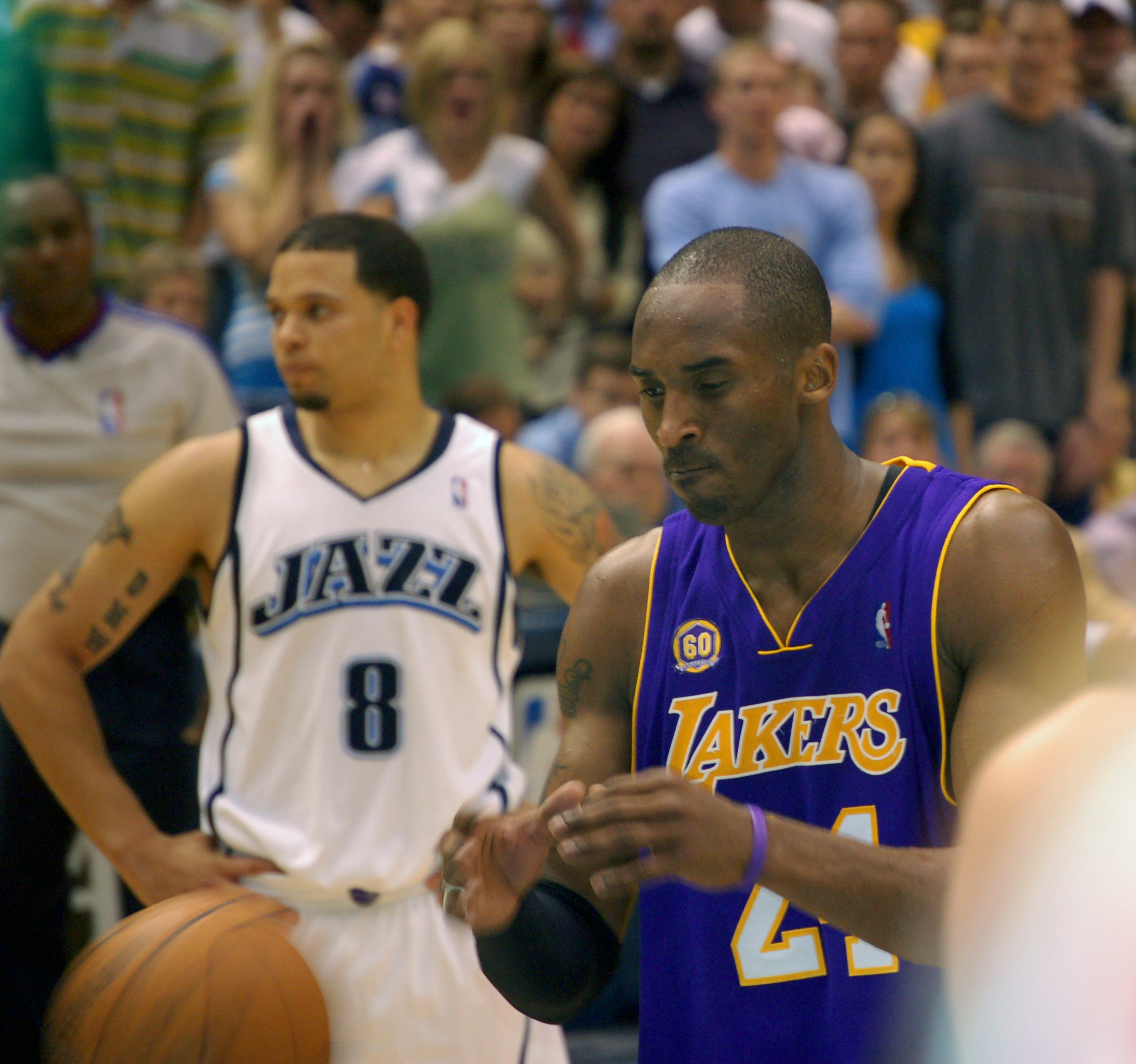
Bryant against the Utah Jazz during Game 4 of the Western Conference Semifinals. The Lakers would go onto the 2008 NBA Finals, but lose to the Boston Celtics in six games

On December 23, 2007, Bryant became the youngest player (29 years, 122 days) to reach 20,000 points, in a game against the New York Knicks, after scoring 39 points, 11 rebounds, and 8 assists. On March 28, Bryant scored a season-high 53 points and 10 rebounds in a loss to the Memphis Grizzlies. Despite an injury to his shooting hand's pinkie, described as "a complete tear of the radial collateral ligament, an avulsion fracture, and a volar plate injury at the MCP joint" that occurred in a February 5, 2008 game, Bryant played all 82 games of the regular season instead of opting for surgery.

Aided by the trade for All-Star Pau Gasol, Bryant led his team to a conference-leading 57–25 record. The Lakers swept the Denver Nuggets in the first round and was named the league MVP. He said, "It's been a long ride. I'm very proud to represent this organization, to represent this city." He was the only unanimous selection to the All-NBA team, for the third straight and sixth time. He also headlined the NBA All-Defensive First Team with Kevin Garnett.

In the first game of the next round, against the Utah Jazz, he scored 38 points as the Lakers beat the Jazz in Game 1. The Lakers won the next game, but dropped Games 3 and 4, despite Bryant's 33.5 points per game. The Lakers then won the next two to win the semifinals. This set up a berth against the Spurs. The Lakers won in five games, reaching the Finals against the Boston Celtics. This marked the fifth time in Bryant's career, and the first time without O'Neal, that the Lakers made the Finals. The Lakers lost to the Boston Celtics in the 2008 NBA Finals in six games. In early September 2008, Bryant rejected surgery to repair his pinkie.

=== Back-to-back championships (2008–2010) ===
Bryant and the 2009 NBA champion Lakers visit the White House

Bryant led the team to tie the franchise record for most wins to start the season going 17–2, and by the middle of December they had a 21–3 record. He was again selected as an All-Star game starter. He was named Western Conference Player of the Month for December and January and Western Conference Player of the week three times. In a game against the Knicks on February 2, 2009, Bryant scored 61 points, setting a record for the most points scored at Madison Square Garden. During the 2009 NBA All-Star Game, Bryant shared the All-Star Game co-MVP with O'Neal. The Lakers had the best record in the West (65–17). Bryant was runner-up in the MVP voting behind James, and was again selected to the All-NBA First and All-Defensive First Teams.

In the 2009 playoffs, the Lakers defeated the Utah Jazz in five games, the Houston Rockets in seven, and the Denver Nuggets in six, the Lakers again made the NBA Finals. The Lakers defeated the Orlando Magic in five. Bryant was awarded his first NBA Finals MVP,averaging 32.4 points, 7.4 assists, 5.6 rebounds, 1.4 steals and 1.4 blocks. He became the first player since Jerry West in the 1969 NBA Finals to average at least 32.4 points and 7.4 assists for a Finals series and the first since Jordan to average 30 points, five rebounds, and five assists for a championship team.

During the 2009–10 season, Bryant made seven game-winning shots including a buzzer-beating, one-legged three-pointer over Dwyane Wade on December 4, 2009, beating the Heat 108–107. He considered it one of his luckiest shots. A week later, he suffered an avulsion fracture in his right index finger in a game against the Minnesota Timberwolves. He continued playing. Five days later, he made another game-winning shot, against the Milwaukee Bucks in overtime. Bryant made another game-winning three-pointer against the Sacramento Kings, and the game-winning field goal against the Boston Celtics. He became the youngest (31 years, 151 days) player to reach 25,000 points, surpassing Chamberlain. The following day, Bryant surpassed West to become the Lakers' all-time leading scorer. After he was sidelined by an ankle injury, which forced him to miss the 2010 NBA All-Star Game, he made his return and made another clutch three-pointer to give the Lakers a one-point lead with four seconds remaining against the Memphis Grizzlies. Two weeks later, he made his sixth game-winning shot of the season, against the Toronto Raptors. On April 2, 2010, Bryant signed a three-year contract extension worth $87 million.

The Lakers defeated the Oklahoma City Thunder in the first round of the 2010 NBA playoffs in six games. The Lakers swept the Utah Jazz in the second round and beat the Phoenix Suns in five games in the conference finals. In Game 2, Bryant finished with 13 assists, setting a new playoff career-high; it was the most by a Laker in the playoffs since Magic Johnson in 1996 (also 13).

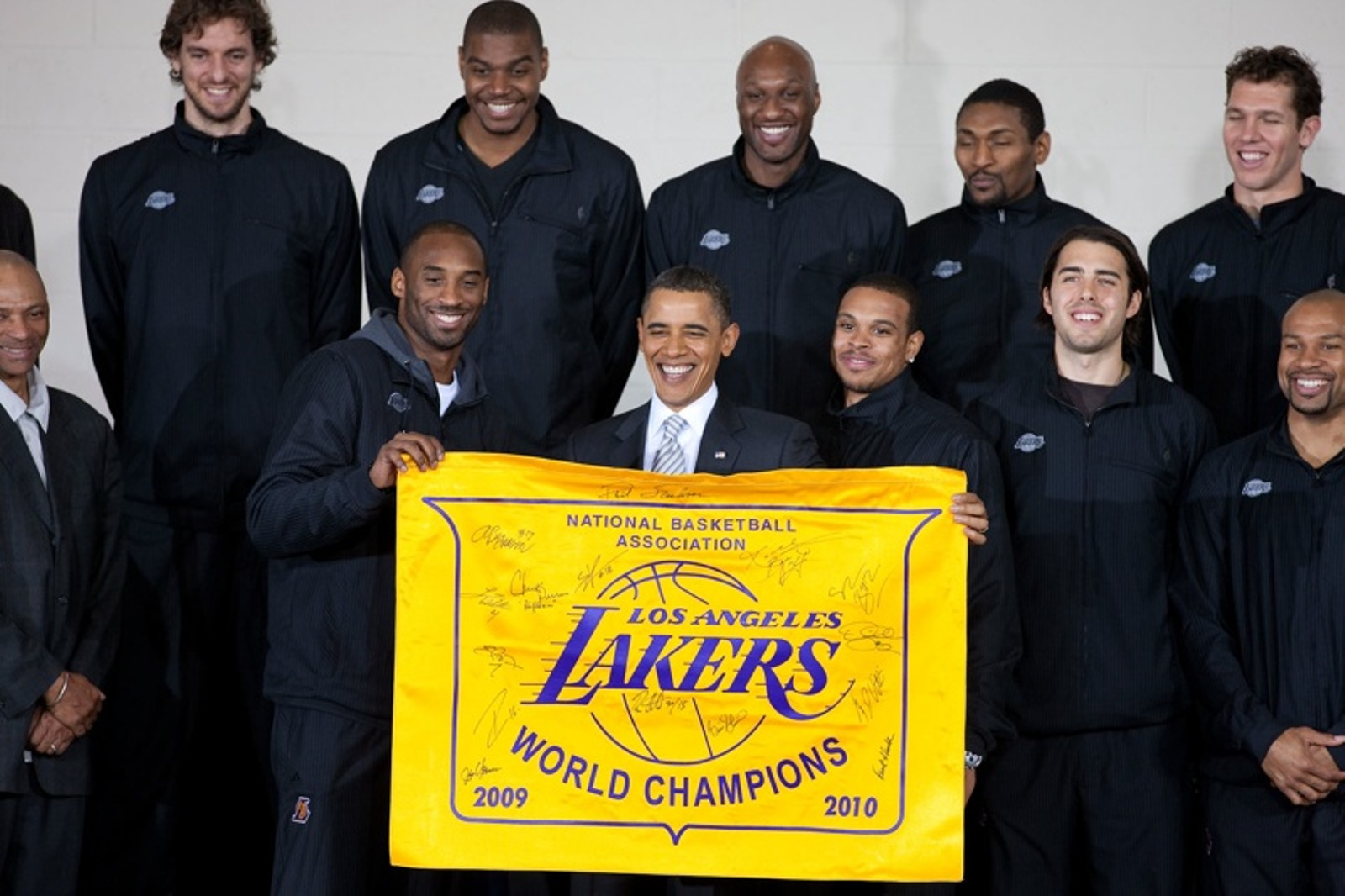
Bryant and the Lakers meet with President Barack Obama in honor of the 2010 NBA champion

In the Finals, the Lakers won their second consecutive championship by beating the Boston Celtics in seven games. He finished the game with 15 rebounds, tying an NBA Finals record for a shooting guard shared by Sam Jones and Tom Gola. He won his fifth championship and his second consecutive Finals MVP award. This was the first time the Lakers won a Finals game 7 against the Celtics. He said this was the most satisfying of his five championships.

=== Post-championship struggles (2010–2013) ===
The Lakers started the 2010–11 season by winning their first eight. On January 30, 2011, against the Celtics, Bryant became the youngest player to reach 27,000 points. Two days later, he became one of seven with at least 25,000 points, 5,000 rebounds, and 5,000 assists. For his 13th straight All-Star game, he was the leading vote-getter and won his fourth All-Star MVP, tying Bob Pettit's record. He rose from 12th to 6th on the career scoring list. He finished the season averaging less than 20 shots a game, his fewest since 2003–04. The NBA fined Bryant $100,000 for directing a gay slur at referee Bennie Adams in frustration. Bryant and other Lakers appeared in a public service announcement denouncing his behavior. The Lakers were swept by the eventual champion Mavericks in the second round.

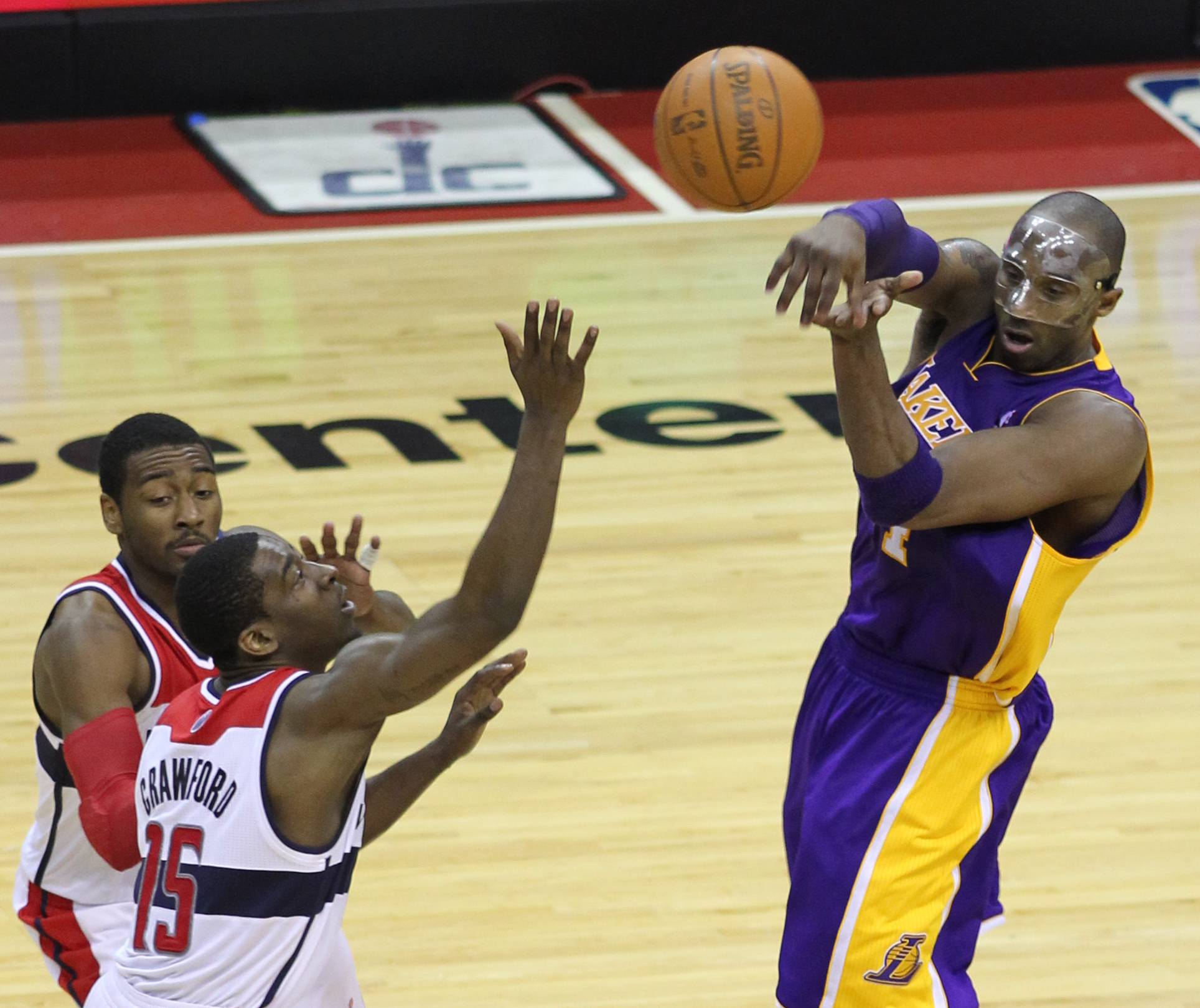
Bryant wearing a mask in 2012 after suffering a broken nose

Ahead of the lockout-shortened 2011–12 season, Bryant received experimental platelet-rich plasma therapy called Orthokine in Germany to treat left knee and ankle pain. He began the season with an injured wrist. On January 10, he scored 48, 40, 42, and 42 in consecutive games for the sixth time, chasing Chamberlain's 19 times. At the 2012 NBA All-Star Game, Bryant scored 27 to pass Jordan as the career scoring leader in All-Star Games. He suffered a broken nose and concussion after a hard foul from Dwyane Wade. He sat out the season finale, falling 38 points short versus Kevin Durant in the race for the scoring title. Durant and Oklahoma City beat the Lakers in the second round, losing in five in Bryant's final postseason appearance.

In 2012–13, the Lakers acquired center Dwight Howard and point guard Steve Nash. On November 2, 2012, Bryant scored 40 with two steals, passing Magic Johnson (1,724) as the Lakers career leader in steals. However, the Lakers lost to the Clippers and started the season 0–3 for the first time in 34 years. After starting 1–4, coach Brown was replaced by Mike D'Antoni, whom Bryant knew as a child when D'Antoni was a star player in Italy. Bryant had grown close with D'Antoni during their time with Team USA. On December 5 against New Orleans, Bryant became the youngest player (34 years and 104 days) to score 30,000 points, joining Chamberlain, Jordan, Kareem Abdul-Jabbar, and Karl Malone to reach that milestone.

In a move to improve defense, D'Antoni had Bryant guard the opponent's best perimeter player; he was the primary defender on the Cavaliers' Kyrie Irving, holding him to 15 points. Bryant acknowledged he was a more focused defender with a challenging defensive assignment, as opposed to when he played off the ball against weaker players. His defense disrupted opponents and protected Nash from unfavorable matchups.

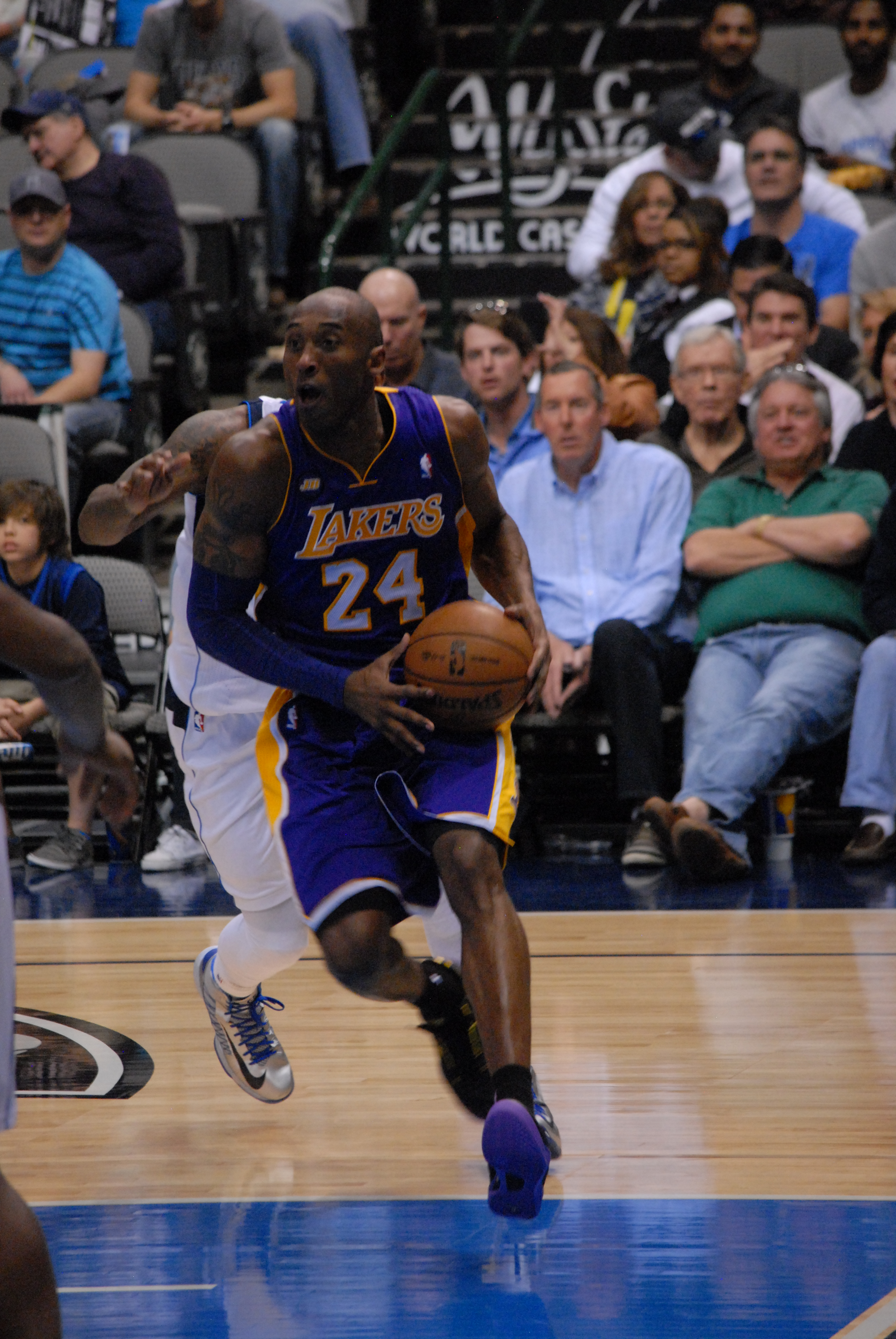
Bryant driving against the Dallas Mavericks on February 24, 2013. Bryant tallied 38 points in a performance that would be later dubbed "the amnesty game"

Bryant led the league in scoring through much of the first 42 games. With a disappointing 17–25 start to the season, D'Antoni made Bryant the primary facilitator on offense and moved Nash off the ball to become a spot-up shooter. In crucial March wins, he scored 40+ and had 10+ assists in back-to-back games, the first Laker since West. On February 22, Mavericks owner Mark Cuban suggested that the Lakers waive Bryant via the amnesty clause of the collective bargaining agreement to save on luxury tax. The Lakers called the comment 'inappropriate', and Bryant responded by scoring 38 points in the Lakers' 103-99 road victory at Dallas on February 24, tweeting "Amnesty THAT" after the game. Bryant surpassed Chamberlain to become the fourth-leading scorer in league history in a March 30, 2013, victory.

With the Lakers fighting to secure the final playoff berth in the Western Conference, Bryant began playing nearly all 48 minutes each game. On April 10, 2013, he became the first player in NBA history to get 47 points, eight rebounds, five assists, four blocks, and three steals in a game. Two days later, Bryant suffered a torn Achilles tendon against the Golden State Warriors, ending his season. Bryant's injury came while he was playing at least 40 minutes in seven consecutive games. The 34-year-old was averaging his most minutes (38.6) in six years, outdone only by Portland rookie Damian Lillard. Lakers general manager Mitch Kupchak had spoken to Bryant about his playing time, but Bryant insisted it needed to continue given the Lakers' playoff push. He had surgery on April 13 to repair the tear, likely missing 6-9 months of the next season.

Bryant ended the season with averages of 27.3 points, 5.6 rebounds, and 6 assists per game on 46.3% shooting. However, The New York Times called his season "perhaps some of the finest work of his career". He reached 40 points eight times, and had 10+ assists 11 times. Bryant's assists were the second-highest of his career and his field goal percentage was its highest since 2008–09. The Lakers were swept by the San Antonio Spurs in the first round.

=== Injury-plagued years (2013–2015) ===
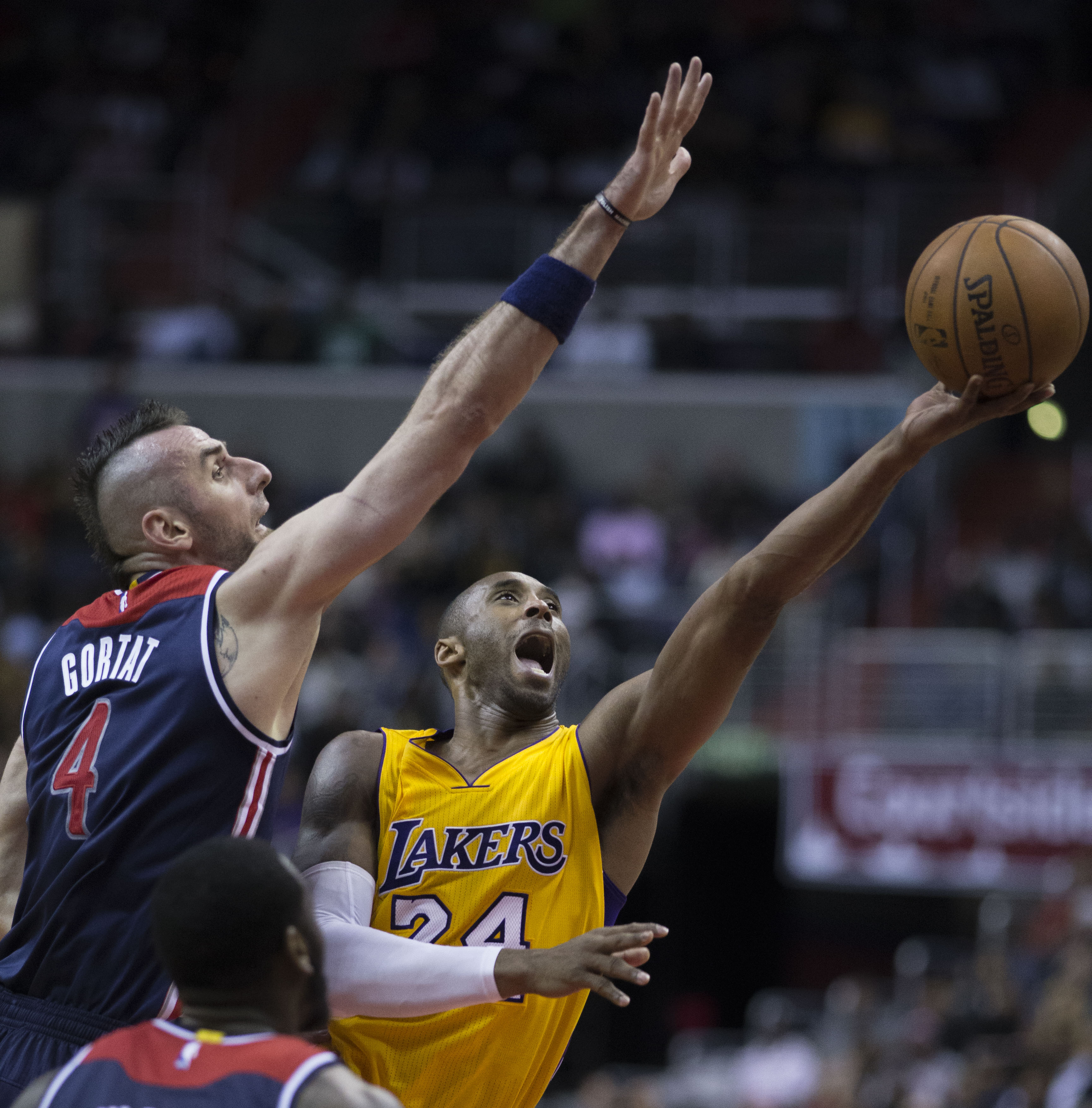
Bryant attempts a left-handed layup against Marcin Gortat, December 2014

In October 2013, Bryant travelled to Germany to undergo Orthokine on his right knee, the same platelet-rich plasma therapy he had on his right knee in 2011. The treatment was not related to the torn Achilles he suffered in April. Bryant resumed practicing after the 2013–14 season had begun. On November 25, he signed an estimated $48.5 million, two-year contract extension. He remained the league's highest-paid player, although he accepted a smaller deal; Bryant had been eligible to receive an extension starting at $32 million per year. His contract polarized fans, with detractors arguing that stars should take less money to allow their team more financial freedom, while supporters countered that stars were underpaid.

He resumed playing on December 8, scoring nine points, adding 8 assists and 4 rebounds, in a 106–94 home loss to the Toronto Raptors. Nine days later, he suffered a lateral tibial plateau fracture in his left knee. He had notched six games since returning from his Achilles injury, including playing point guard after injuries to Nash, Steve Blake, and Jordan Farmar. He was averaging 13.8 points, 6.3 assists, and 4.3 rebounds. Despite his injuries, he was voted by fans to start in his 16th All-Star game. He did not appear in the game or for the rest of the season, due to his knee. The Lakers finished 27–55 and missed the playoffs for the first time since 2005.

Bryant returned for the 2014–15 season, his 19th, coached by his former teammate, Byron Scott. On November 30, in a 129–122 overtime victory over the Toronto Raptors, Bryant recorded his 20th career triple-double with 31 points, 12 assists, and 11 rebounds. At 36, Bryant became the oldest NBA player to go 30/10/10. (Note: Larry Bird held the previous record; he was 35 when he had 49 points, 14 rebounds, and 12 assists on March 15, 1992, against Portland.) On December 14, he became the NBA's third all-time leading scorer, passing Jordan (32,292) in a 100–94 victory over Minnesota.

He played in the first 27 games, averaging team-highs with 26 points and 35 minutes while leading the league with 22+ shots. Scott then rested him for three games after one of his worst performances of the season. He was suffering from soreness in his knees, feet, back, and Achilles tendons. Bryant had exceeded 40 minutes three times, and the coach blamed himself for overloading him after a great start to the season. In his second game back, Bryant went 23/11/11 in a 111–103 victory over Denver, becoming the third player to record multiple triple-doubles in a season at 36+. (Note: The others were Chamberlain (2 in 1972–73) and Kidd (2 each in 2009–10 and 2010–11).)

On January 21, Bryant suffered a rotator cuff tear in his right shoulder against the New Orleans Pelicans. The right-handed Bryant ran the offense while shooting, dribbling, and passing almost exclusively with his left hand. Prior to the injury, Bryant had rested in eight of 16 games. He underwent season-ending surgery, ending up with 22 points at a career-low 37%, well below his 45% career mark. Bryant was expected to be sidelined for nine months with a return targeted toward the start of the 2015–16 season. The Lakers finished the season at 21–61, worse than the previous, all-time bad year.

=== Final season and retirement (2015–2016) ===
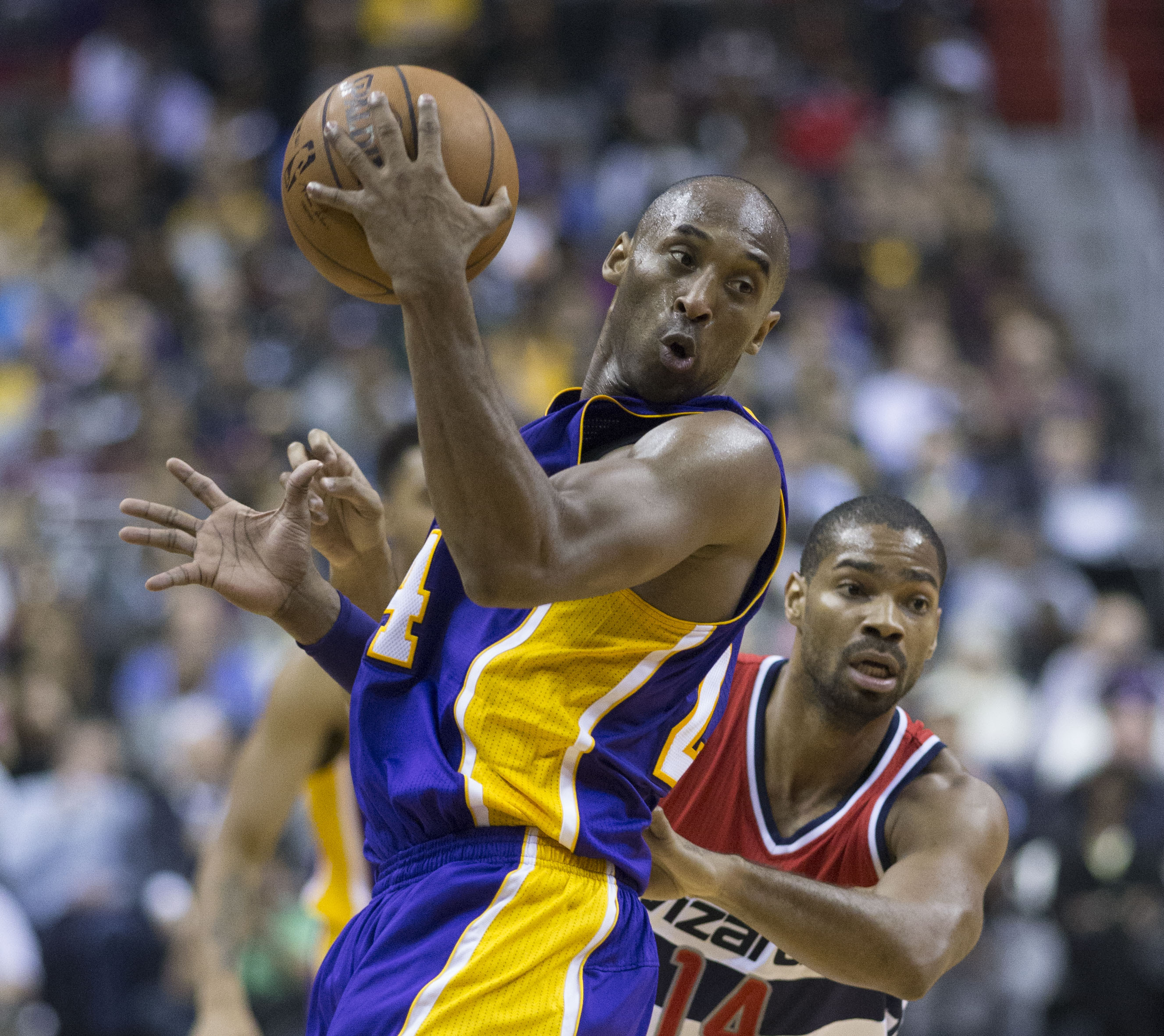
Bryant in 2015 playing against Gary Neal of the Washington Wizards after announcing his forthcoming retirement

After recovering to play in the 2015–16 preseason, Bryant suffered a calf injury and missed the final two weeks of exhibition games. He played in the season opener, thereby surpassing John Stockton's league record of 19 for the most seasons with the same team.

On November 29, 2015, Bryant announced via The Players' Tribune that he would retire at the end of the season. In his poem titled "Dear Basketball", Bryant wrote that he fell in love with the game at age six.

[The 2015–16] season is all I have left to give.
My heart can take the pounding
My mind can handle the grind
But my body knows it's time to say goodbye.
And that's OK. I'm ready to let you go.

In a letter distributed to Lakers' fans, Bryant wrote: "What you've done for me is far greater than anything I've done for you. ... My love for this city, this team and for each of you will never fade. Thank you for this incredible journey."

At the time of his announcement, Bryant was second on the team in minutes (30.8) behind Jordan Clarkson and leading the team with 16.7 field goal attempts per game, while averaging just 15.7 points and shooting a career-low 31.5 percent. Bryant's free throw attempts had dropped from his career average, and his game had become over-reliant on pump fakes and long-range shots, making a league-worst 19.5 percent from three-point range while attempting seven a game, almost double his career average.

Bryant requested that opposing teams on the road not hold any on-court ceremonies in his honor or present him any gifts in public. Prior to announcing his retirement, Bryant had been steadfast about not wanting the fuss of a staged farewell tour, preferring boos to cheers. However, Bryant was still honored around the league with video tributes and fan ovations, including arenas that historically jeered him. Bryant was astonished by the cheers.

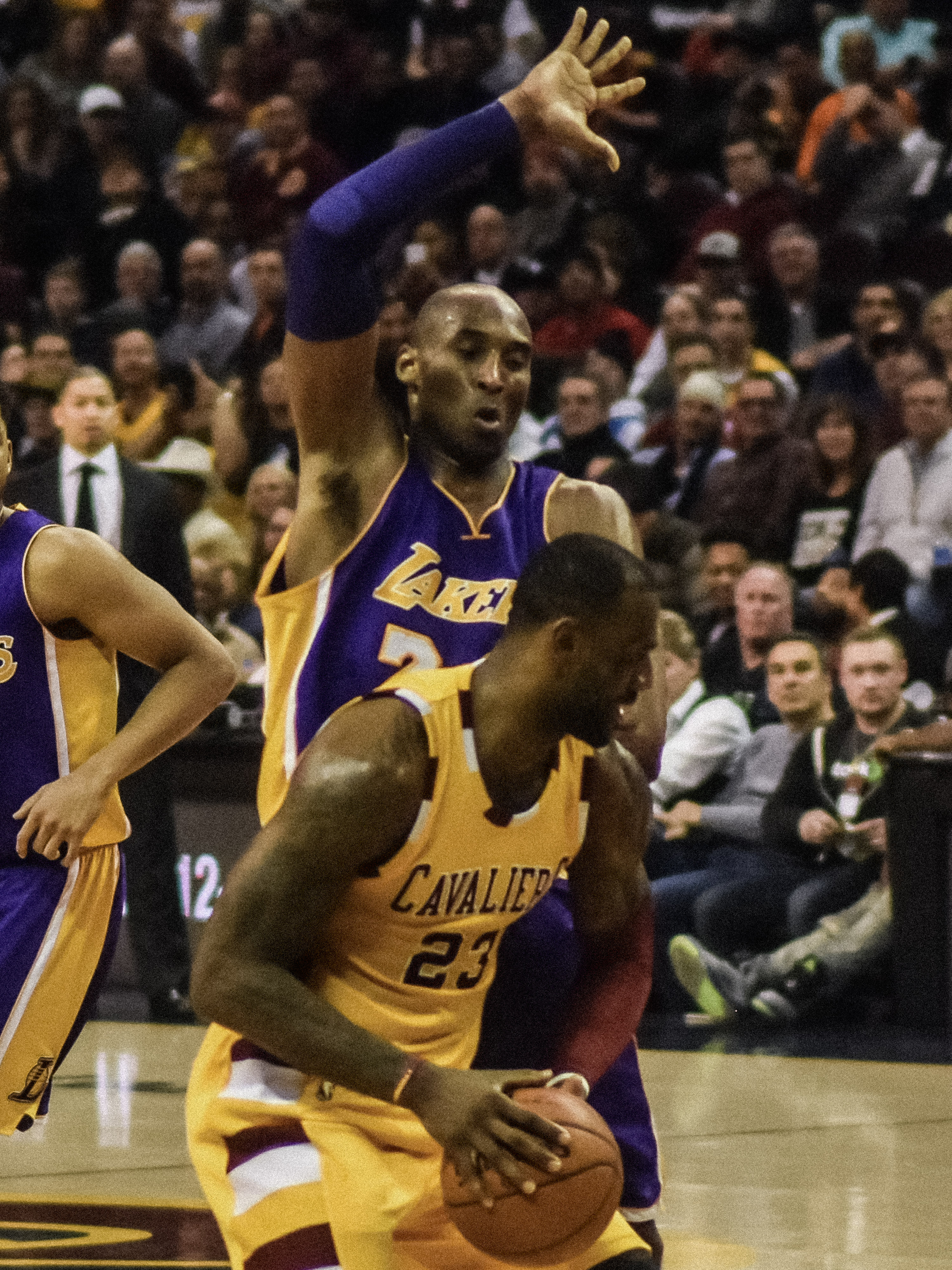
Bryant, in his final game in Cleveland, defending LeBron James in February 2016

In a 119–115 victory over the Timberwolves, he made seven three-pointers and scored 38, including 14 of the team's 18 in the last 5:02 of the game The win ended a 10-game losing streak, avoiding becoming the Lakers' longest losing streak. He became the fourth 37+ player to log at least 35/5/5. (Note: He joined Jordan (3 times), Karl Malone (3) and Abdul-Jabbar) Bryant was the leading vote-getter for the 2016 All-Star Game with 1.9 million votes, beating Stephen Curry's 1.6 million. After moving to small forward that season, Bryant was a frontcourt starter for the first time. West teammates offered to feed him the ball in an attempt to get him another All-Star MVP, but Bryant declined.

The Lakers beat the Jazz 101–96 in his final game and finished the season at 17–65, the worst in Lakers' history. Bryant scored an NBA season-high 60 points on a career-high 50 shots—the most shots in the prior 30 seasons—and outscoring the Jazz by himself 23–21 in the fourth quarter. He also set the record for the most points in a final regular season game. He was the first player his age to score 60+ at 37 years and 234 days. After the game, Bryant spoke to the Staples Center crowd:

I can't believe how fast 20 years went by. [...] To be standing [on the] center court with you guys, my teammates behind me, appreciating the journey that we've been on — we've been through our ups [and] downs. I think the most important part is we all stayed together throughout. [...] Thank you guys for all the years of support. Thank you guys for all the motivation. Thank you for all the inspiration. What can I say? Mamba out.

== National team career ==
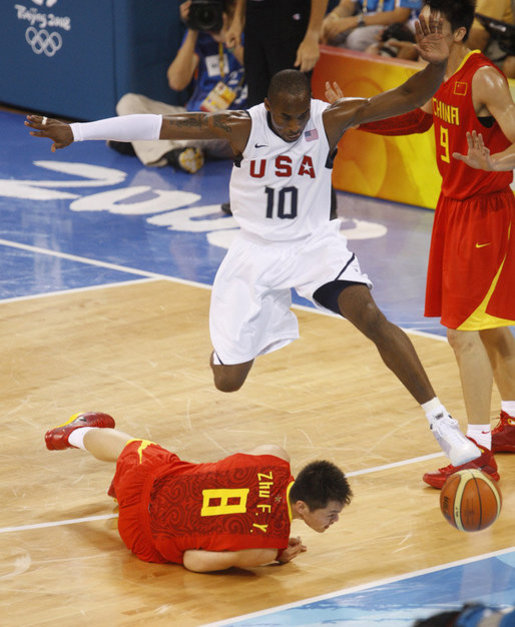
Bryant avoiding a collision in a game against China at the 2008 Summer Olympics

Bryant declined to play in the 2000 Olympics because he was getting married. He also decided not to play in the 2002 FIBA World Championship. He was originally selected for the FIBA Americas Championship in 2003, but withdrew after arthroscopic shoulder and knee surgeries. The following summer, he withdrew from the Olympic team because of his sexual assault case. He was named to the 2006–2008 U.S. preliminary roster, but knee surgery sidelined him from the 2006 FIBA World Championship.

Bryant's United States national team career began in 2007. He was a member of the 2007 USA Men's Senior National Team and USA FIBA Americas Championship Team that finished 10–0, won gold and qualified the United States men for the 2008 Olympics. Bryant started in all 10 games. He averaged 15.3/2.9/2.0 with 1.6 steals.

Bryant won Olympic gold medals in 2008 and 2012. He was named to the USA Men's Senior National Team for the 2008 Summer Olympics. In his first trip to the Olympics. he scored 20, along with six assists, as Team USA defeated Spain 118–107 in the gold medal game for its first gold medal since the 2000 Olympics. He averaged 15.0/2.8/2.1, shooting .462 in the eight Olympic contests. This team is occasionally referred to as "The Redeem Team". He rejoined the national team for the 2012 Summer Olympics. After winning another gold medal, he decided to retire from the team. finished his national team career with a 26–0 record.

In retirement, he was one of the global ambassadors of the 2019 FIBA Basketball World Cup in China. One of the LA 2028 emblem variations is inspired by Bryant and his brand.

== Player profile ==
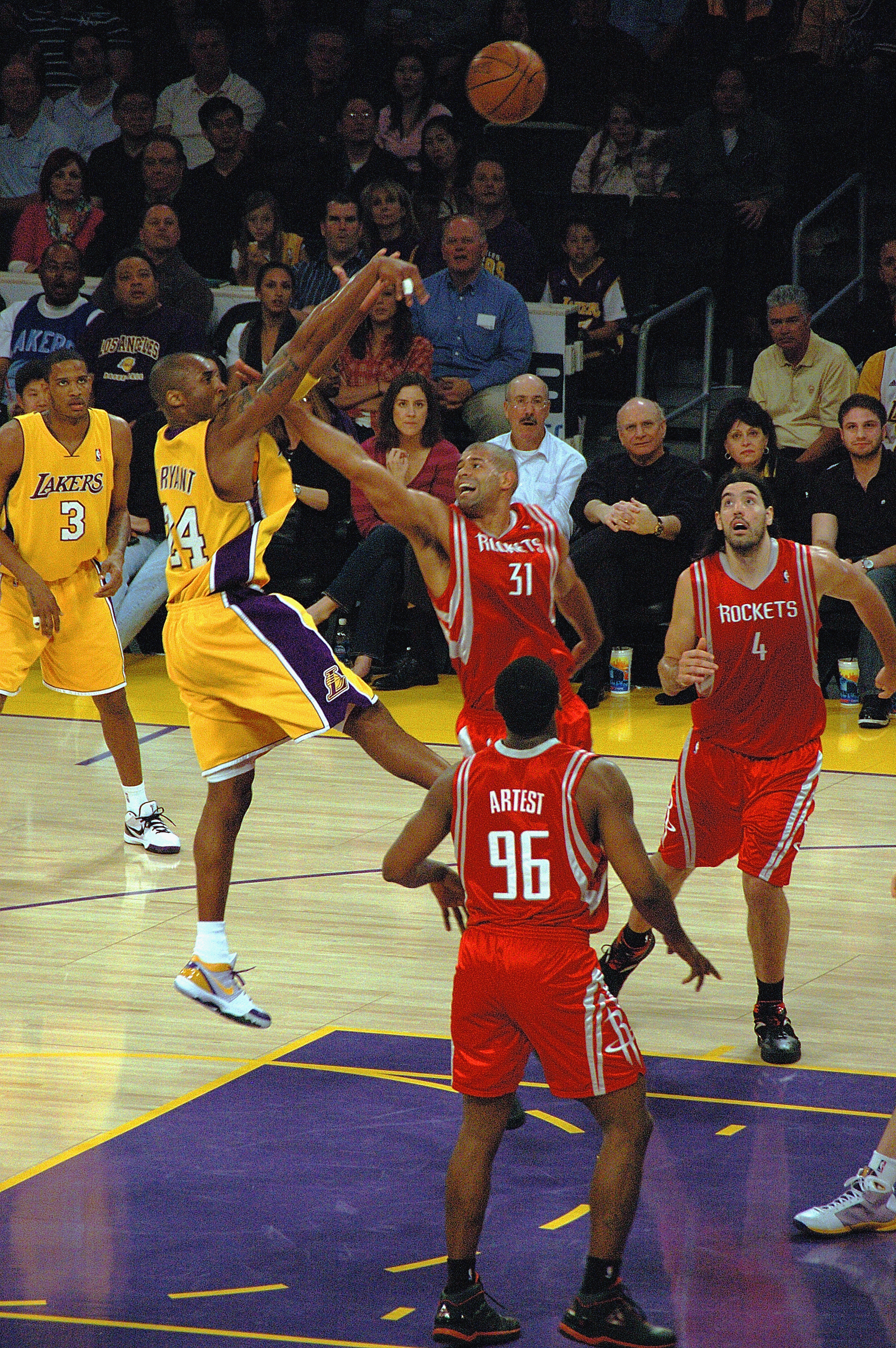
Bryant shoots a fadeaway over Shane Battier in 2009

Bryant was a shooting guard. He was listed at 6 feet 6 inches (1.98 m) and 212 pounds (96 kg). He exhibited a high pain threshold while playing through injuries.

=== Offense ===
Bryant was often cited as one of the NBA's most prolific scorers. He drew frequent comparisons to Jordan, after whom Bryant modeled his playing. Like Jordan, Bryant became most known for his fall-away jump shot. Chris Ballard of Sports Illustrated described another of Bryant's moves as the "jab step-and-pause" in which Bryant jabbed his non-pivot foot forward to let the defender relax but instead of bringing the jab foot back, Bryant pushed off of it and drove around his opponent to reach the basket. Bryant learned post moves through individual coaching sessions from Hakeem Olajuwon.

Bryant established a reputation for his shots in the closing moments of tight games, even when double or triple-teamed, and was noted as one of the premier closers in the NBA. In a 2012 annual survey of NBA general managers, Bryant was selected for the 10th consecutive season as the player general managers would want to take a clutch shot with a game on the line. Bryant's willingness to take difficult shots drew criticism.

Bryant goes up for a shot against a double team. As Bryant misses the shot, resulting in what analyst Kirk Goldsberry termed "The Kobe Assist", Ron Artest, left, gets the offensive game winning putback, Game 5 of the 2010 Western Conference Finals vs. the Phoenix Suns

Throughout his career, Bryant was disparaged as a selfish, high-volume shooter; he missed more shots than any other player (LeBron James passed him in 2024). (Note: In 2014, Bryant passed Havlicek's previous mark of 13,417 missed shots, and he retired with 14,481.) Phil Jackson stated that Bryant "tends to force the action, especially when the game isn't going his way. When his shot is off, Kobe will pound away relentlessly until his luck turns." According to Bryant, "I would go 0 for 30 before I would go 0 for 9; 0 for 9 means you beat yourself, you psyched yourself out of the game."

=== Defense ===
In addition to his offense, Bryant also established himself as a defensive player. Bryant rarely drew charges when he played defense, which he believed spared his body and contributed to his longevity. However, some critics have suggested that Bryant's defensive accolades in his later years were based more on his reputation than his play. Bryant was suspended five times during his NBA career, with Tony Allen noting "As dynamic and with the finesse Kobe can play with, most people probably don't think he can get grimy. That dude right there, he'll get an offensive foul and throw an elbow right in your nose or neck."

=== Relationships with other players ===
Bryant made opponents and teammates alike the objects of his scorn. Many players considered him difficult to play with because of his high level of commitment and performance. According to sportswriter Mark Heisler of Forbes, "circa 2004–2007, Kobe was the most alienated superstar the NBA had ever seen." Bryant enjoyed being the villain, and reveled in silencing a hostile crowd with his play.

After O'Neal's departure, he led the Lakers to two NBA championships; during this period, Bryant became more of a mentor to his teammates than before. Jackson noted that in his earlier years, if Bryant talked to teammates it was usually "give me the damn ball". During the latter period, Bryant "embraced the team and his teammates, calling them up when we were on the road and inviting them out to dinner. It was as if the other players were now his partners, not his personal spear-carriers."

=== Nicknames ===
Inspired by the codename for Uma Thurman's character in the Kill Bill films, Bryant assigned himself the nickname of "Black Mamba", citing a desire for his basketball skills to mimic the eponymous snake's ability to "strike with 99% accuracy at maximum speed, in rapid succession". His work ethic was called the "Mamba mentality". During the 2012–13 season, Bryant began referring to himself as "vino" to describe how his play had been aging like a fine wine.

== Legacy ==
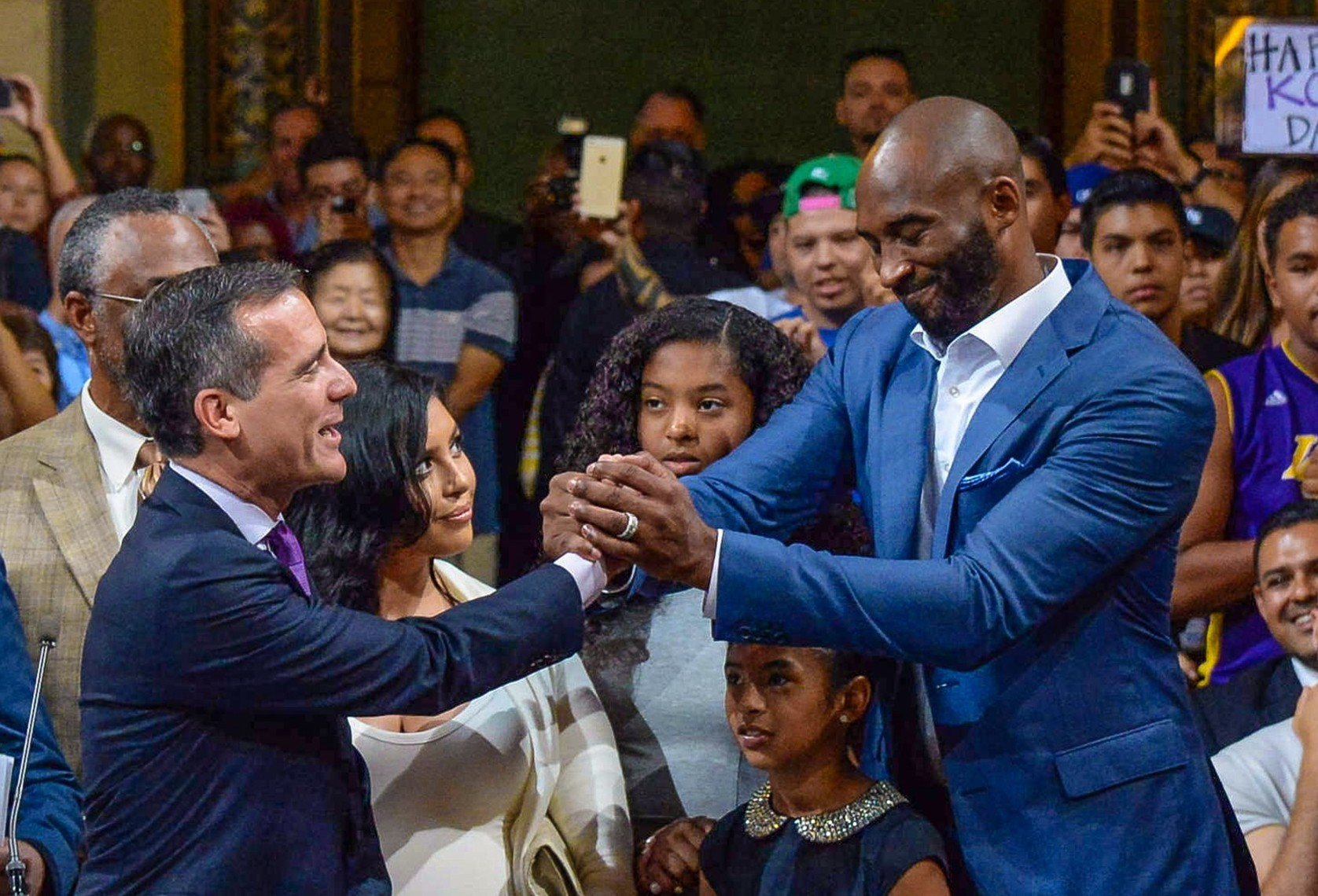
Bryant holding Los Angeles Mayor Eric Garcetti's hand during a 2016 ceremony in which the city of Los Angeles declared August 24 as "Kobe Bryant Day"

Bryant is considered one of the greatest basketball players of all time. Adam Silver called him "one of the greatest players in the history of our game." The New York Times wrote that Bryant had "one of the most decorated careers in the history of the sport." Reuters called him "arguably the best player of his generation", while both Sporting News and TNT named him their NBA player of the decade for the 2000s. ESPN ranked Bryant the second-greatest shooting guard of all time after Jordan. The Athletic ranked their top 75 players, placing Bryant in the 10th spot and the second-highest shooting guard, behind Jordan. Many peer players—including Kevin Durant, Dirk Nowitzki, Dwyane Wade, and Derrick Rose—called Bryant their generation's version of Michael Jordan. He is also considered one of the greatest Lakers as the all-time leading scorer and with five titles tied for the most in Lakers' history..The Press-Enterprise described Bryant as "maybe the greatest Laker in the organization's history".

=== Achievements and awards ===
Bryant and his family celebrate the 2009 NBA championship, June 2009

Bryant was an 18-time All-Star, ranking third. Bryant was chosen a then-record 18 straight times, each time as a starter. In 2003, 2011, 2013, and 2016, he was the leading vote-getter. Bryant was named the All-Star MVP four times. Bryant was selected to the All-NBA Team on 15 occasions, 11 times on the first team. Bryant was a 12-time All-Defensive Team selection. Bryant was named to the All-Defensive First Team nine times. He was the first guard to play 20 seasons. Bryant won the NBA Slam Dunk Contest in 1997, its youngest winner. According to Forbes, at the time of his retirement, Bryant's $680 million in career earnings was the most ever by a team athlete during their playing career.

He had numerous honors after his retirement. Both numbers Bryant wore during his career, 8 and 24, were retired by the Lakers on December 18, 2017. He was elected to the Naismith Memorial Basketball Hall of Fame soon after his death in April 2020. His formal induction was delayed until 2021 due to the COVID-19 pandemic. His wife, Vanessa, delivered the acceptance speech on his behalf.In October 2021, Bryant was honored as one of the league's all time greatest players, named to the NBA 75th Anniversary Team.

=== Posthumous tributes and memorials ===
There were numerous tributes and memorials after his death. In January 2022, coinciding with the second anniversary of his death, a statue of Bryant and his daughter Gianna was placed at the crash site in Calabasas. Later in February, the NBA renamed the All-Star Game MVP trophy after Bryant. Kobe Bryant Day was held on August 24, 2023. The Lakers stated that Bryant's statue outside of Crypto.com Arena would be unveiled on February 8, 2024, to honor his two numbers with the Lakers, 8 and 24, and 2 for the number of his daughter Gianna. The inspiration for the statue, based on an image of Bryant after his 81-point game, pointing a finger toward the sky, was requested by Bryant before his death. On August 2, 2024, the Lakers unveiled a statue of Kobe and Gianna Bryant outside of Crypto.com Arena.

== NBA statistics ==
Bryant averaged 25.0 points, 5.2 rebounds, 4.7 assists, and 1.4 steals per game, He is the fourth-leading scorer in league history with 33,643 points. (Note: At the time of his retirement, he was the third-leading scorer in NBA history until he was passed by LeBron James shortly before his death.) He was the first player to have at least 30,000 career points and 6,000 career assists, and one of only four players with 25,000 points, 6,000 rebounds, and 6,000 assists. He led the NBA in scoring during the 2005–06 and 2006–07 seasons. His 81-point performance against Toronto in 2006 was the then second-highest in NBA history. He scored at least 50 points 24 times in his career, ranking third; and he scored at least 60 on six occasions. He was the third player to average 40 points in a calendar month. (Note: Chamberlain did it 15 times, and Baylor once.)

Legend
GP	Games played	GS	Games started	MPG	Minutes per game
FG%	Field goal percentage	3P%	3-point field goal percentage	FT%	Free throw percentage
RPG	Rebounds per game	APG	Assists per game	SPG	Steals per game
BPG	Blocks per game	PPG	Points per game	**Bold**	Career high
†	Won an NBA championship	*	Led the league

=== Regular season ===
Year	Team	GP	GS	MPG	FG%	3P%	FT%	RPG	APG	SPG	BPG	PPG
1996–97	L.A. Lakers	71	6	15.5	.417	.375	.819	1.9	1.3	.7	.3	7.6
1997–98	L.A. Lakers	79	1	26.0	.428	.341	.794	3.1	2.5	.9	.5	15.4
1998–99	L.A. Lakers	50*	50*	37.9	.465	.267	.839	5.3	3.8	1.4	**1.0**	19.9
1999–00†	L.A. Lakers	66	62	38.2	.468	.319	.821	6.3	4.9	1.6	.9	22.5
2000–01†	L.A. Lakers	68	68	40.9	.464	.305	.853	5.9	5.0	1.7	.6	28.5
2001–02†	L.A. Lakers	80	80	38.3	**.469**	.250	.829	5.5	5.5	1.5	.4	25.2
2002–03	L.A. Lakers	**82**	**82***	**41.5**	.451	**.383**	.843	**6.9**	5.9	**2.2**	.8	30.0
2003–04	L.A. Lakers	65	64	37.6	.438	.327	.852	5.5	5.1	1.7	.4	24.0
2004–05	L.A. Lakers	66	66	40.7	.433	.339	.816	5.9	6.0	1.3	.8	27.6
2005–06	L.A. Lakers	80	80	41.0	.450	.347	.850	5.3	4.5	1.8	.4	**35.4***
2006–07	L.A. Lakers	77	77	40.8	.463	.344	**.868**	5.7	5.4	1.4	.5	31.6*
2007–08	L.A. Lakers	**82***	**82***	38.9	.459	.361	.840	6.3	5.4	1.8	.5	28.3
2008–09†	L.A. Lakers	**82***	**82***	36.1	.467	.351	.856	5.2	4.9	1.5	.5	26.8
2009–10†	L.A. Lakers	73	73	38.8	.456	.329	.811	5.4	5.0	1.5	.3	27.0
2010–11	L.A. Lakers	**82**	**82***	33.9	.451	.323	.828	5.1	4.7	1.2	.1	25.3
2011–12	L.A. Lakers	58	58	38.5	.430	.303	.845	5.4	4.6	1.2	.3	27.9
2012–13	L.A. Lakers	78	78	38.6	.463	.324	.839	5.6	6.0	1.4	.3	27.3
2013–14	L.A. Lakers	6	6	29.5	.425	.188	.857	4.3	**6.3**	1.2	.2	13.8
2014–15	L.A. Lakers	35	35	34.5	.373	.293	.813	5.7	5.6	1.3	.2	22.3
2015–16	L.A. Lakers	66	66	28.2	.358	.285	.826	3.7	2.8	.9	.2	17.6
Career		1,346	1,198	36.1	.447	.329	.837	5.2	4.7	1.4	.5	25.0
All-Star		15	15	27.6	.500	.324	.789	5.0	4.7	2.5	.4	19.3

=== Playoffs ===
Year	Team	GP	GS	MPG	FG%	3P%	FT%	RPG	APG	SPG	BPG	PPG
1997	L.A. Lakers	9	0	14.8	.382	.261	.867	1.2	1.2	.3	.2	8.2
1998	L.A. Lakers	11	0	20.0	.408	.214	.689	1.9	1.5	.3	.7	8.7
1999	L.A. Lakers	8	8	39.4	.430	.348	.800	6.9	4.6	**1.9**	1.3	19.8
2000†	L.A. Lakers	22	22	39.0	.442	.344	.754	4.5	4.4	1.5	**1.5**	21.1
2001†	L.A. Lakers	16	16	43.4	.469	.324	.821	**7.3**	**6.1**	1.6	.8	29.4
2002†	L.A. Lakers	19	19	43.8	.434	.379	.759	5.8	4.6	1.4	.9	26.6
2003	L.A. Lakers	12	12	44.3	.432	**.403**	.827	5.1	5.2	1.2	.1	32.1
2004	L.A. Lakers	22	22	44.2	.413	.247	.813	4.7	5.5	**1.9**	.3	24.5
2006	L.A. Lakers	7	7	**44.9**	**.497**	.400	.771	6.3	5.1	1.1	.4	27.9
2007	L.A. Lakers	5	5	43.0	.462	.357	**.919**	5.2	4.4	1.0	.4	**32.8**
2008	L.A. Lakers	21	21	41.1	.479	.302	.809	5.7	5.6	1.7	.4	30.1
2009†	L.A. Lakers	**23**	**23**	40.8	.457	.349	.883	5.3	5.5	1.7	.9	30.2
2010†	L.A. Lakers	**23**	**23**	40.1	.458	.374	.842	6.0	5.5	1.3	.7	29.2
2011	L.A. Lakers	10	10	35.4	.446	.293	.820	3.4	3.3	1.6	.3	22.8
2012	L.A. Lakers	12	12	39.7	.439	.283	.832	4.8	4.3	1.3	.2	30.0
Career		220	200	39.3	.448	.331	.816	5.1	4.7	1.4	.6	25.6

== Personal life ==
=== Family ===
In November 1999, 21-year-old Bryant met 17-year-old Vanessa Laine while she was working as a background dancer on the Tha Eastsidaz music video "G'd Up". He was working on his debut album. They began dating and became engaged six months later in May 2000. They married on April 18, 2001, at St. Edward the Confessor Catholic Church in Dana Point, California. The wedding was not attended by Bryant's parents, his two sisters, his longtime advisor and agent Arn Tellem, or his Lakers teammates. His parents were opposed to the marriage, reportedly, because he was so young, and she was not African-American. (Note: Vanessa Bryant's father is of Mexican and Italian descent and her mother is of Mexican and Filipino descent.) The couple's first daughter was born in January 2003.

Due to an ectopic pregnancy, Vanessa suffered a miscarriage in the spring of 2005. Their second daughter, Gianna Maria-Onore (also referred to as "Gigi"), was born in May 2006. On December 16, 2011, Vanessa Bryant filed for divorce, citing irreconcilable differences. The couple requested joint custody of their daughters. On January 11, 2013, Bryant and his wife announced that they had called off their divorce. In early December 2016, Vanessa gave birth to their third daughter, and in January 2019, the Bryants announced they were expecting a fourth daughter, who was born in June 2019.

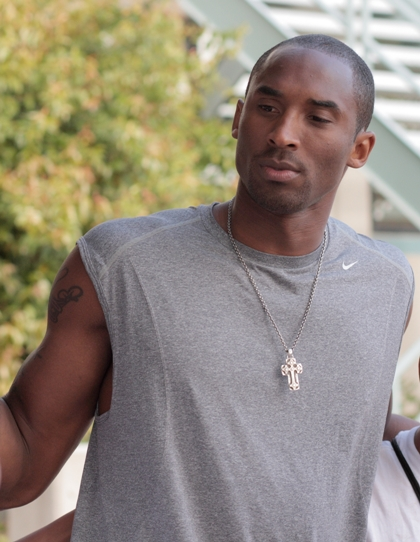
Bryant wearing a cross necklace at his basketball academy, July 2007

In 2013, Bryant had a legal disagreement with an auction house over memorabilia from his early years that his parents had put up for auction. His parents received $450,000 from the auction house for the items, and contended Bryant had given them the rights to the items he had remaining in their home. However, Bryant's lawyers asked the auction house to return the items. Before the scheduled trial, a settlement was reached allowing the auction house the sale of fewer than 10% of the items. His parents apologized to him for the misunderstanding in a written statement, and appreciated the financial support he had given them over the years.

=== Religion ===
Bryant was a practicing Catholic. He said his faith and a priest helped him through difficult times, such as the period following his rape accusation. A Catholic cantor said that she was inspired by Bryant's faith, and the respect that he showed her. Bryant and his family were regular attendees at Our Lady Queen of Angels Catholic Church in Newport Beach. He and daughter Gianna received the Eucharist together just hours before they died. He said that he practiced meditation for fifteen minutes per day.

=== Sexual assault case ===
In the summer of 2003, the sheriff's office of Eagle, Colorado, arrested Bryant in with a sexual assault complaint filed by a 19-year-old hotel employee. Bryant was there for knee surgery. The accuser stated that Bryant raped her in his hotel room the night before the procedure. Bryant admitted to an adulterous sexual encounter with his accuser, but denied her sexual assault allegation. Bryant was charged on July 18, 2003. The accusation damaged Bryant's reputation, and the public's perception of him plummeted; McDonald's and Nutella terminated endorsement contracts. Sales for Bryant's replica jersey fell. In September 2004, the assault case was dropped by prosecutors after the accuser decided not to testify. Bryant agreed to apologize to her for the incident, including a public mea culpa: "Although I truly believe this encounter between us was consensual, I recognize now that she did not and does not view this incident the same way I did. After months of reviewing discovery, listening to her attorney, and even her testimony in person, I now understand how she feels that she did not consent to this encounter." The accuser filed a separate lawsuit against Bryant, which the two sides settled privately.

== Business interests ==
=== Endorsements ===
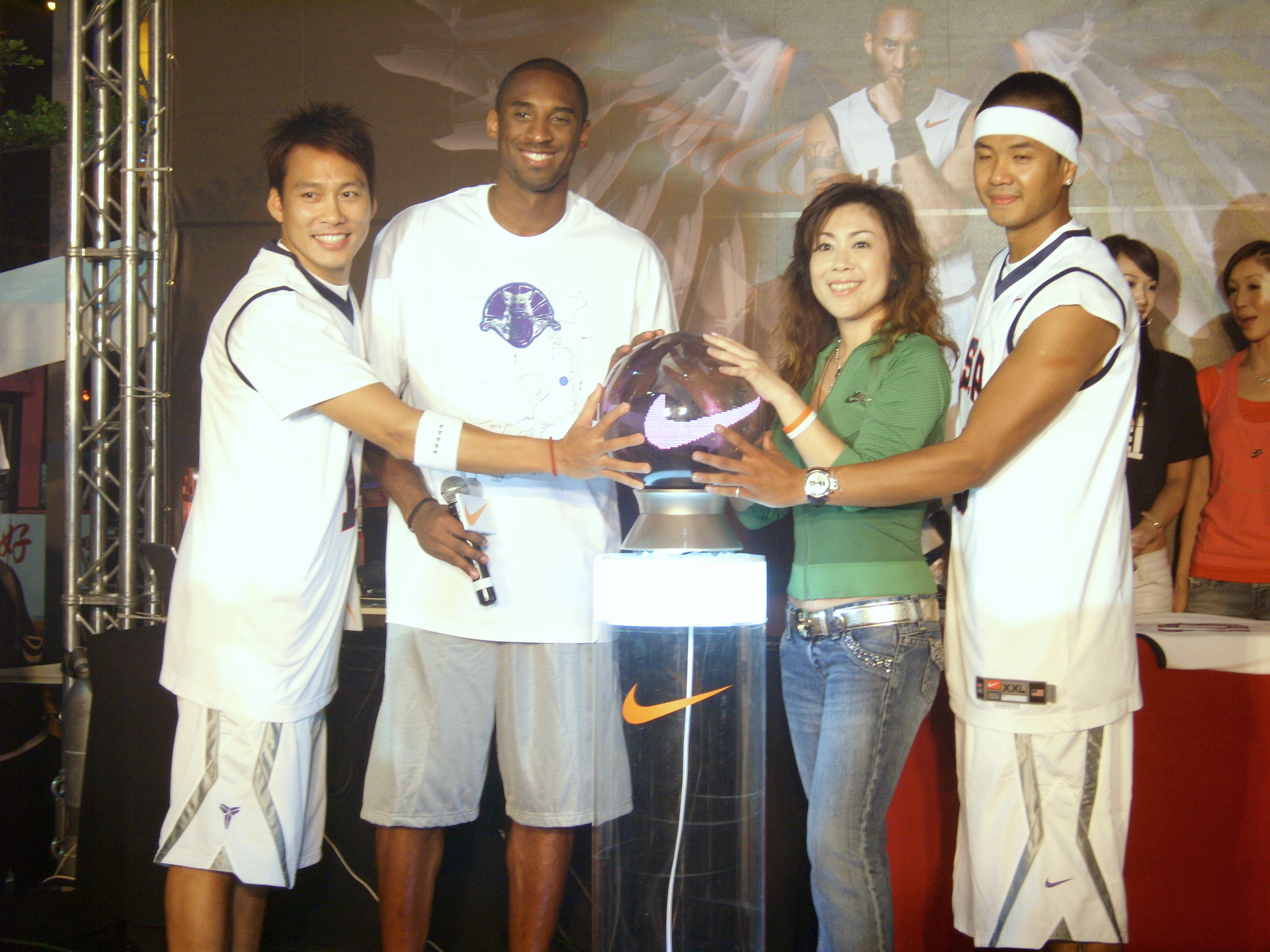
Bryant at a Nike store launch ceremony in Taipei, 2007

Before starting the 1996–97 season, Bryant signed a six-year contract with Adidas worth approximately $48 million. His first signature shoe was the Equipment KB 8. Bryant's other, earlier endorsements included deals with The Coca-Cola Company to endorse Sprite, McDonald's, promoting Spalding's NBA Infusion Ball, Upper Deck, Ferrero SpA's brand Nutella, Russell Corporation, and appearing in Kobe-themed video games by Nintendo.

He lost many contracts over the rape allegations. A notable exception was Nike, Inc., who had just signed Bryant to a five-year, $40–45 million contract. They did not use his image or market his new shoe for the year, but resumed two years later, when his image had recovered. Bryant then scored endorsement deals with The Coca-Cola Company's susbidiary Energy Brands, to promote Vitamin Water. He was the cover athlete for NBA '07: Featuring the Life Vol. 2 and appeared in commercials for Guitar Hero World Tour in 2008 and Call of Duty: Black Ops in 2010.

He was on numerous video game covers including Kobe Bryant in NBA Courtside, NBA Courtside 2: Featuring Kobe Bryant, NBA Courtside 2002, NBA 3 on 3 featuring Kobe Bryant, NBA '07: Featuring the Life Vol. 2, NBA 09: The Inside, NBA 2K10 NBA 2K17 (Legend Edition; Legend Edition Gold) NBA 2K21 (Mamba Forever Edition), and NBA 2K24 (Kobe Bryant Edition and Black Mamba Edition).

Nike Zoom Kobe IV "POP" (Playoff Pack) Finals MVP, released in 2009

Nike Zoom Kobe 1, Bryant's first signature shoe with Nike, in the Minneapolis Lakers colorway, re-released in 2018 as a "Protro" (performance retro)

In a 2008 video promoting Nike's Hyperdunk shoes, Bryant appears to jump over a speeding Aston Martin. The stunt was considered fake, and the Los Angeles Times said a real stunt would probably violate Bryant's Lakers contract. Nike then released the fourth edition of his signature shoe, Zoom Kobe IV. In 2010, Nike launched Nike Zoom Kobe V.

In 2009, Bryant signed a deal with Nubeo to market the Black Mamba Collection, sports/luxury watches ranging from $25,000 to $285,000. On February 9, 2009, he was featured on the cover of ESPN The Magazine. CNN estimated Bryant's endorsement deals in 2007 to be worth $16 million a year.

In 2010, he ranked third, behind Tiger Woods and Jordan, in Forbes' list of the world's highest-paid athletes, with $48 million. Bryant signed a two-year endorsement deal with Turkey's national airline, Turkish Airlines. In 2013, Forbes ranked Bryant the fifth-highest-paid sports star.

=== Philanthropy ===
Bryant and his wife founded the Kobe and Vanessa Bryant Family Foundation in 2007. The foundation has contributed to various non-profits and fundraisers. He started the Kobe Bryant China Fund which partnered with the Soong Ching Ling Foundation, a charity backed by the Chinese government. The fund raises money for education and health programs in China. In 2010, Bryant appeared alongside Zach Braff appeared at an event where they presented a $1 million check to the Call of Duty Endowment, an Activision-founded nonprofit organization that helps veterans transition to civilian careers after leaving the military. Bryant and his wife were founding donors of the National Museum of African American History and Culture, and they donated the uniform that he wore in the 2008 NBA Finals. Bryant granted over 200 requests for the Make-A-Wish Foundation.

=== Business ventures ===
Bryant established Kobe Inc. to own and grow brands in the sports industry. His initial investment was a 10% stake in the Bodyarmor SuperDrink company for $6 million in March 2014. The Coca-Cola Company purchased a minority stake in the company in August 2018, increasing Bryant's share to approximately $200 million.

In 2013, Bryant launched a production company called Granity Studios, which developed media, ranging from films to television shows and novels.

On August 22, 2016, Bryant and his business partner Jeff Stibel launched Bryant-Stibel, a venture capital firm focused on media, data, gaming, and technology, with $100 million in funding. In 2018, Bryant and Sports Academy launched Mamba Sports Academy, a joint athletic-training business venture. The academy established locations in Thousand Oaks and Redondo Beach, California.

== Media figure ==
=== Music ===
In high school, Bryant was a member of a rap group called CHEIZAW, named after the Chi Sah gang in the martial arts film Kid with the Golden Arm. The group was signed by Sony Entertainment, but the company wanted to have Bryant record on his own to capitalize on Bryant's fame. In 1997, he performed at a concert by Sway & King Tech and recorded a verse for a remix of Brian McKnight's "Hold Me". He appeared on O'Neal's Respect, starting the track "3 X's Dope", though Bryant was not credited. He appeared on Brian McKnight and Tone's 1998 single "Hold Me."

Sony pushed Bryant from underground hip hop into a more radio-friendly sound. His debut album, Visions, was scheduled to release in the spring of 2000. The first single, "K.O.B.E'", featured supermodel Tyra Banks singing the hook. The single debuted in January 2000, and was performed at NBA All-Star Weekend that month, but it was not well received. Sony abandoned plans for the album, which was never released, and dropped Bryant later that year. Bryant co-founded an independent record label, Heads High Entertainment, but it folded within a year. In 1999, he appeared on a remix of "Say My Name" by Destiny's Child on their Maxi single.

In 2011, Bryant was featured in Taiwanese singer Jay Chou's single "The Heaven and Earth Challenge" (天地一鬥, pronounced "Tian Di Yi Dou"). The proceeds for downloads of the single and ringtones were donated to impoverished schools for basketball facilities and equipment. The music video also features Bryant. The song was used by Sprite in its 2011 marketing campaign in China.

In 2009, American rapper Lil Wayne released a song called "Kobe Bryant". Similarly, in 2010, American rapper Sho Baraka released a song called "Kobe Bryant On'em", which was featured on his album Lions and Liars. In 2012, American rapper Chief Keef released "Kobe", a tribute song. It was featured on his album, Finally Rich, as a part of the deluxe edition. For the NBA 2K21 soundtrack, Damian Lillard, under his stage name Dame D.O.L.L.A., released a tribute track titled "Kobe", featuring Snoop Dogg and Derrick Milano.

=== Film and television ===
Bryant made his acting debut in 1996, appearing in an episode of Moesha. Bryant had met the show's star, Brandy, earlier in the year at a Nike All-Star basketball game; a couple of months later, in May 1996, he was Brandy's date to her Hollywood High School senior prom. That year, Bryant guest starred as himself on an episode of Arli$$ (episode: "What About the Fans?") and Sister, Sister (episode: "Kid-Napped"). In 1997, Bryant appeared on an episode of Hang Time, followed by a guest appearance on the Nickelodeon sketch comedy series All That (1998). He was also the first choice for the role of Jesus Shuttlesworth in Spike Lee's 1998 film He Got Game, but withdrew, saying "this summer is too big for me."

Bryant was the subject of Spike Lee's 2009 documentary film Kobe Doin' Work, which chronicled Bryant during the 2007–08 NBA season.

In 2018, Bryant became the first African-American to win the Academy Award for Best Animated Short Film, and the first former professional athlete to be nominated for and win an Academy Award in any category, for his film Dear Basketball. Despite winning the Oscar, he was denied membership into the Academy of Motion Pictures Arts and Sciences due to his lack of a larger body of work. The film also won the Annie Award for Best Animated Short Subject and a Sports Emmy Award. The film was produced by Bryant's production company, Granity Studios. In addition to future animation projects, Bryant was in talks with animator veteran Bruce Smith six months before his death about starting his own animation studio.

Beginning in 2018, Bryant wrote, produced and hosted the television series Detail, which aired for multiple seasons on ESPN and ESPN+. It featured his basketball insights and in-depth analyses of games and players.

==== Credits ====
Year	Title	Role	Notes
1996	Moesha	Terry Hightower	Episode: "The Whistle Blower" that aired in September 1996
1996	Arli$$	Himself	Episode: "What About the Fans?"
1996	Sister, Sister	Himself	Episode: "Kid-Napped"
1997	Hang Time	Himself	Episode: "The Hustlers" that aired October 1997
1998	All That	Himself	Participated in the “What-Everrr” sketch with Amanda Bynes and Christy Knowings
2000	Bette	Himself	Episode: "I Love This Game" with Bette Midler that aired November 2000
2009	Kobe Doin' Work	Himself	A documentary film by Spike Lee that focuses on Bryant before, during, and immediately after one game of the 2007–08 Los Angeles Lakers season.
2010	Modern Family	Himself	Season 1 - Episode 24 - 'Family Portrait'
2011	The Black Mamba	Himself	A short fictional film that pitches Bryant as a hero called "The Black Mamba"
2014	Nowitzki. The Perfect Shot	Himself	
2015	Daddy's Home	Himself	Cameo appearance in comedy film
2015	Kobe Bryant's Muse	Himself	Also executive producer
2017	Dear Basketball	Himself	Also writer and executive producer; winner of Best Animated Short Film at the 90th Academy Awards.
2017	Musecage	Himself	Also creator and writer; produced by Granity Studios for ESPN and ESPN+
2018	Detail	Himself	Also creator and writer; 18 episodes as a host, 16 episodes as a writer; produced by Granity Studios for ESPN and ESPN+
2019	Quiet Storm: The Ron Artest Story	Himself	Documentary about Ron Artest for Showtime
2020	The Last Dance	Himself	Episode: "V"; Posthumous release
2022	The Redeem Team (film)	Himself	Posthumous release of documentary film about the 2008 United States men's Olympic basketball team
2022	Kobe: Una storia italiana	Himself	Documentary film about Bryant's ties to Italy, which was released on Amazon Prime Video Italy posthumously

=== Books ===
On October 23, 2018, Bryant's book The Mamba Mentality: How I Play, with photographs and afterword by Andrew D. Bernstein, an introduction by Phil Jackson and a foreword by Pau Gasol, was published. The book looks back on his career.

At the time of his death, Bryant was working with Brazilian author Paulo Coelho on a children's book aimed at inspiring underprivileged children. After Bryant's death, Coelho deleted the draft, saying in an interview that "it didn't make any sense to publish without him." He did not say how many pages had been written or whether the book had a title.

Bryant also co-wrote/produced young adult novels through Granity Studios: The Wizenard Series: Training Camp, Legacy and the Queen, and Epoca: The Tree of Ecrof. A fourth novel, The Wizenard Series: Season One, was released posthumously in March 2020. The Wizarenard Series: Season One topped the New York Times middle-grade hardcover list.

== Death ==
=== Helicopter crash ===
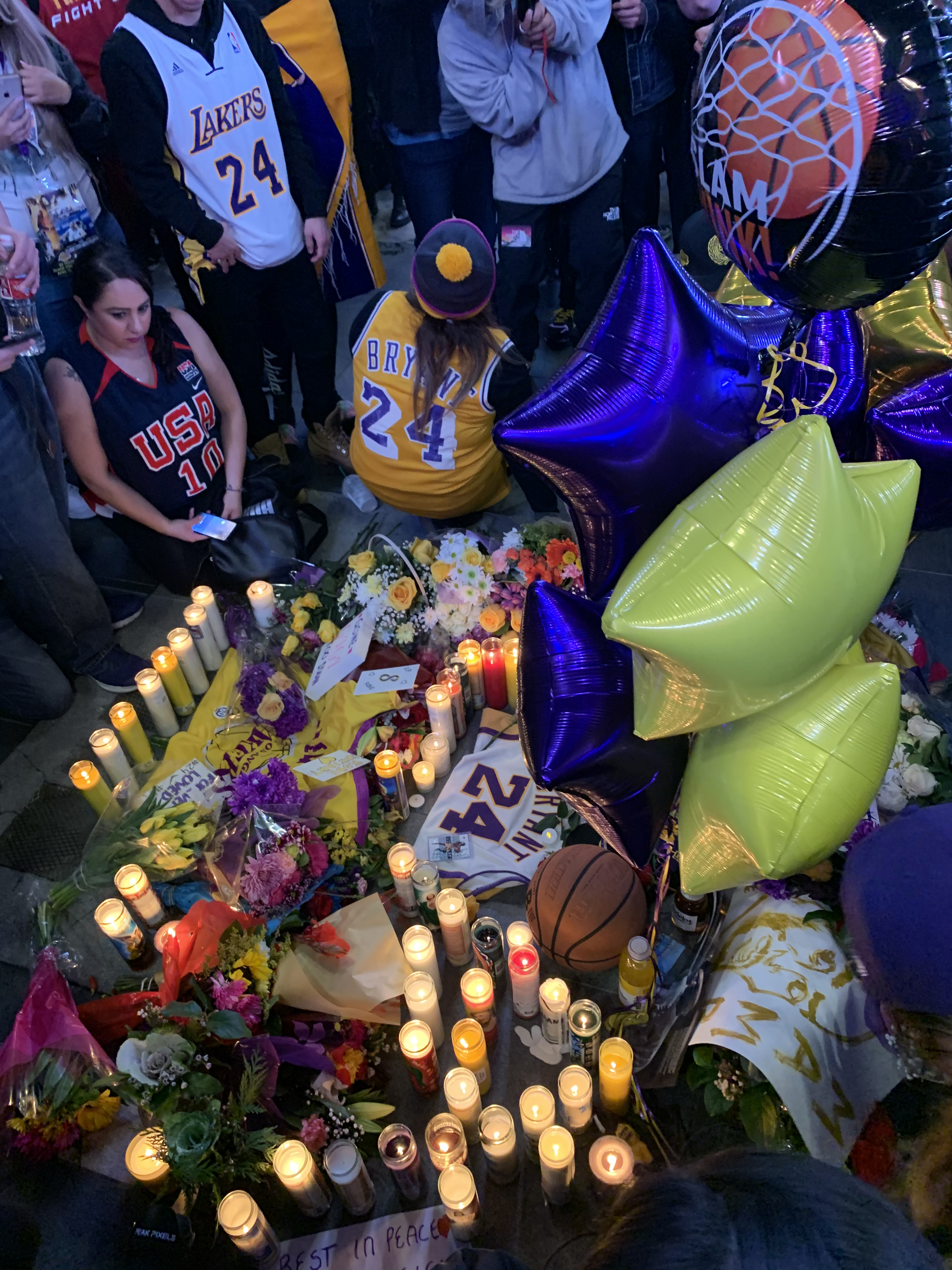
Fans gathered in front of Staples Center (later Crypto.com Arena) on the day of Bryant's death

At 9:06 AM on January 26, 2020, a Sikorsky S-76 helicopter departed from John Wayne Airport in Orange County, California, with nine people aboard: Bryant, his 13-year-old daughter Gianna, six family friends including John Altobelli, and the pilot, Ara Zobayan. The helicopter was registered to the Fillmore-based Island Express Holding Corp., according to the California Secretary of State business database. The group was traveling to Camarillo Airport in Ventura County for a basketball game at Mamba Sports Academy in Thousand Oaks.

Due to light rain and fog that morning, Los Angeles Police Department helicopters and most other air traffic were grounded. The helicopter circled above Glendale, California, due to heavy air traffic. At 9:30, Zobayan contacted the control tower at Hollywood Burbank Airport, and was told he was flying too low to be tracked by radar. Amidst very heavy fog, the helicopter turned south towards the mountains. At 9:40, the helicopter climbed rapidly from 1,200 to 2,000 feet (370 to 610 m), flying at 161 knots (298 km/h; 185 mph).

At 9:45 a.m., the helicopter crashed into the side of a mountain in Calabasas, about 30 miles (48 km) northwest of downtown Los Angeles, and began burning. Bryant, his daughter, and the other seven occupants were killed on impact. Witnesses reported hearing a helicopter struggling before crashing. On January 28, Bryant's identity was officially confirmed using fingerprints. The following day, the Los Angeles County Department of Medical Examiner-Coroner stated that the official cause of death was blunt force trauma.

=== Tributes and services ===
On the day of the crash, numerous NBA teams paid tribute to Bryant with intentional on-court violations referring to his uniform numbers on their first possession—either a 24-second shot clock or an 8-second backcourt violation. The 2020 Pro Bowl took place in Orlando on the day of the crash. Before kickoff, NFC players who learned of Bryant's death conducted a prayer led by Seattle Seahawks quarterback Russell Wilson, while various on-field and PA tributes were made during the game.

The 62nd Annual Grammy Awards went ahead as scheduled at Staples Center on the day of the crash, replete with tributes. Host Alicia Keys opened the show with a tribute in which she called Staples Center (Note: Now called Crypto.com Arena) "the house that Kobe Bryant built" and joining Boyz II Men to sing "It's So Hard to Say Goodbye to Yesterday". He also appeared at the start of the In Memoriam segment of the 92nd Academy Awards following his Oscar in 2018 for Dear Basketball, and Spike Lee wore a suit in tribute to him at the ceremony.

The NBA postponed the Lakers' game against the Clippers two days after the accident on January 28. On January 30, the first game at Staples Center after the crash was played between the Clippers and the Sacramento Kings; the Clippers honored Bryant before the game, with Southern California native Paul George narrating a video tribute.

The next day, the Lakers played their first game after the crash against the Trail Blazers. Ahead of the game, the Lakers paid tribute to all who lost their lives in the crash with a ceremony held before tip-off, with Usher singing "Amazing Grace" and Boyz II Men singing the national anthem, while Wiz Khalifa and Charlie Puth reunited to perform "See You Again" at halftime. James spoke to the crowd before the game, and the players in the Lakers starting lineup were announced with Bryant's name. The game was the second-most-watched in ESPN history, averaging 4.41 million viewers.

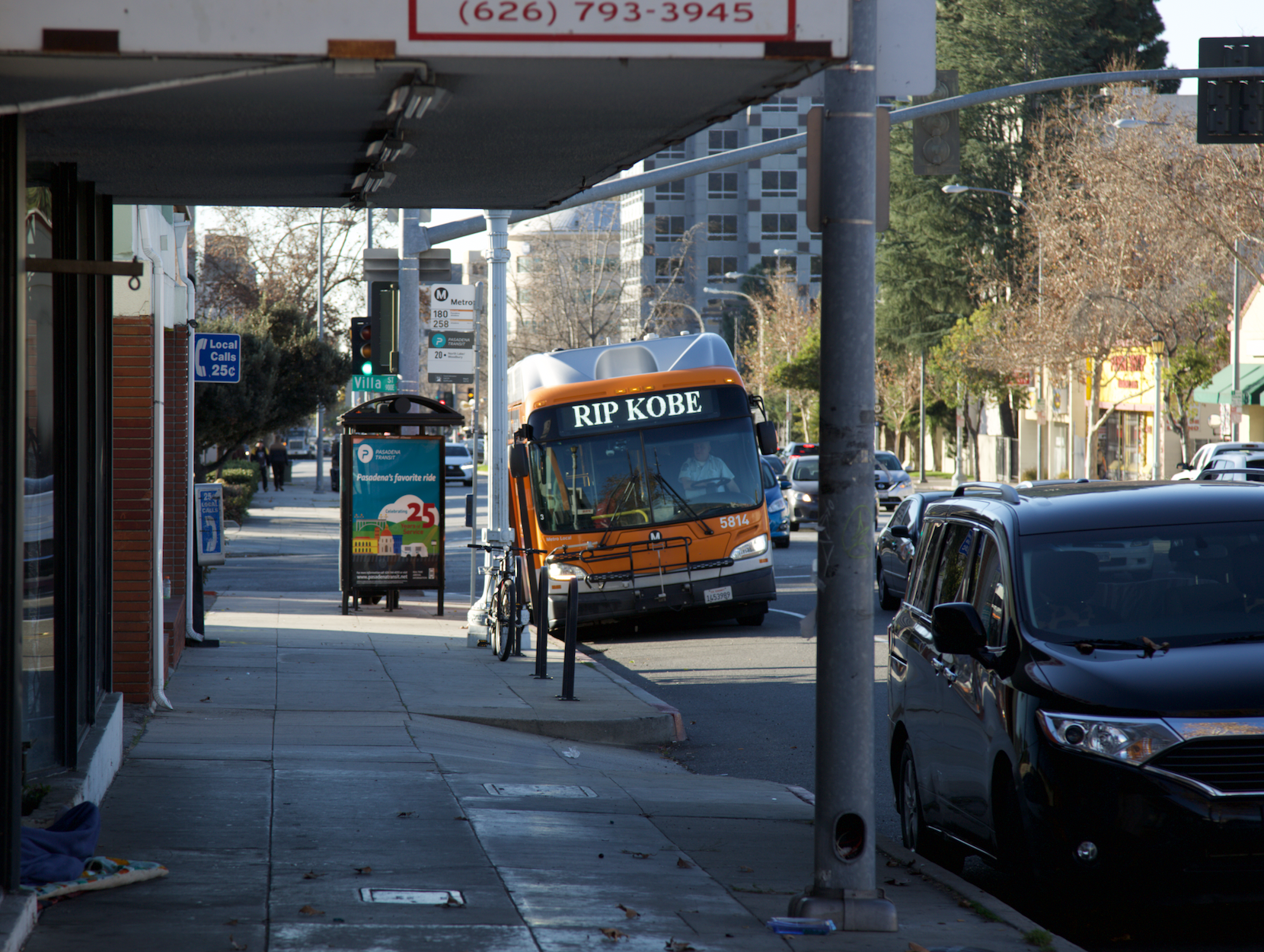
Metro Bus in Los Angeles with "RIP Kobe" banner, January 2020

On February 7, Bryant and his daughter were buried in a private funeral in Pacific View Memorial Park in the Corona del Mar neighborhood of Newport Beach, California. A public memorial service was held on February 24 (2/24, marking Kobe and Gianna's jersey numbers) at Staples Center. Speakers included Vanessa, Jordan, and O'Neal, along with Phoenix Mercury guard Diana Taurasi and Geno Auriemma, Taurasi's coach at Connecticut, where Gianna had aspired to play.

=== Investigation and civil lawsuits ===
The Federal Aviation Administration, National Transportation Safety Board, and the FBI launched investigations. The investigation was hampered because the helicopter was not equipped with a flight recorder. Over a year after the crash, the NTSB declared that the pilot, Zobayan, probably became disoriented by the thick clouds. The five board members found that Zobayan ignored his training and violated federal regulations during the 40-minute flight.

On February 28, 2023, Vanessa Bryant was awarded a $28.85 million settlement from Los Angeles County to conclude legal proceedings over graphic photos of the aftermath of the helicopter crash that were shared without the family's permission. The figure included the $15 million she was awarded from L.A. County in a 2022 civil trial, with "additional funds to settle potential claims from her daughters"—Natalia, 20, Bianka, 6, and Capri, 3. Chris Chester, a co-plaintiff who lost his 45-year-old wife and 13-year-old daughter in the crash, settled for $19.95 million.

"Kobe is a brother to me. From the time I was in high school watching him from afar, to getting in this league at 18 and watching him up close, all the battles that we had throughout my career, the one thing that we always shared was that determination to just want to win, to just want to be great. The fact that I'm here now means so much to me. I want to continue, along with my teammates, his legacy. Not only for this year, but for as long as we can play this game of basketball that we love, because that's what Kobe Bryant would want. So in the words of Kobe Bryant. Mamba out. But in the words of us, not forgotten. Live on, brother."

— LeBron James' tribute to Bryant prior to the Laker's first game since the crash against the Portland Trail Blazers, five days after his death (January 31, 2020)

== See also ==
- List of NBA annual statistical leaders
- List of NBA annual scoring leaders
- List of NBA career scoring leaders
- List of NBA career assists leaders
- List of NBA career steals leaders
- List of NBA career turnovers leaders
- List of NBA career 3-point scoring leaders
- List of NBA career free throw scoring leaders
- List of NBA seasons played leaders
- List of NBA career games played leaders
- List of NBA career minutes played leaders
- List of NBA career triple-double leaders
- List of NBA career playoff assists leaders
- List of NBA career playoff steals leaders
- List of NBA career playoff turnovers leaders
- List of NBA career playoff 3-point scoring leaders
- List of NBA career playoff free throw scoring leaders
- List of NBA career playoff games played leaders
- List of NBA career playoff minutes leaders
- List of NBA franchise career scoring leaders
- List of NBA players with most championships
- List of NBA single-game scoring leaders
- List of NBA single-game playoff scoring leaders
- List of NBA single-game 3-point scoring leaders
- List of NBA single-season scoring leaders
- List of oldest and youngest NBA players
- List of Olympic medalists in basketball
- List of second-generation NBA players
