= NBA Courtside 2002 =

2002 video game

- North American box art with Kobe Bryant
- Developer: Left Field Productions
- Publisher: Nintendo
- Producer: Umrao Mayer
- Designer: Bob Baker
- Programmer: Phillip Watts
- Artist: Allan Spong
- Composer: Joel Simmons
- Platform: GameCube
- Release: NA: January 14, 2002; JP: March 29, 2002; PAL: May 24, 2002
- Genre: Sports
- Modes: Single-player, multiplayer

NBA Courtside 2002 is a basketball video game developed by Left Field Productions and published by Nintendo for the GameCube in 2002. It is the third and final installment in the NBA Courtside series and the sequel to NBA Courtside 2: Featuring Kobe Bryant on the Nintendo 64.

== Gameplay ==
The game features every player from the 2001-02 NBA season, each with his own unique stats, and has season and arcade modes.

The player can customize their team and players, from their statistical attributes to their names and faces. There is a practice gameplay mode as well as a mode to compete against other teams.

== Development ==
The game was first released in the United States. The European release followed three weeks later. Left Field, the developer, was not expected to work with Nintendo again after this release.

== Reception ==
Reception

Aggregate score
Aggregator	Score
Metacritic	71/100

Review scores
Publication	Score
Electronic Gaming Monthly	7.67 out of 10
Eurogamer	8 out of 10
Famitsu	32 out of 40
Game Informer	8.25 out of 10
GamePro	4 out of 5
GameRevolution	C+
GameSpot	7.6 out of 10
GameSpy	77%
IGN	7.5 out of 10
Nintendo Power	4 out of 5

Overall, NBA Courtside 2002 received "average" reviews according to the review aggregation website Metacritic. In Japan, Famitsu gave it a score of 32 out of 40. The game did receive criticism; IGN had issues with the game's artificial intelligence and GameSpy said the "Skills Mode" was "nothing to spend too much time on".

NBA Courtside 2002 had sold over 120,000 copies since its release.

Tom Bramwell of Eurogamer described the game as having great depth and completely outclassing its competitor, NBA Live 2002. He wrote that the game highlighted what Electronic Arts was missing from their own basketball games. In addition to matching their statistical accuracy, Bramwell felt that NBA Courtside was a better simulation and offered an "arcade mode" that competed with the scope of the also-praised NBA Street. Bramwell praised the graphics, gameplay, artificial intelligence, and ball physics. He had particular praise for the sound effects' level of detail.
