= Kobe Bryant in NBA Courtside =

1998 basketball video game

- North American cover art
- Developer: Left Field Productions
- Publisher: Nintendo
- Producer: James Maxwell
- Programmer: Michael Lamb
- Artist: Jeff Godfrey
- Composer: Chris Lamb
- Platform: Nintendo 64
- Release: NA: April 27, 1998; EU: June 10, 1998
- Genre: Sports
- Modes: Single player, multiplayer

Kobe Bryant in NBA Courtside, sometimes mislabeled as Kobe Bryant's NBA Courtside, is a 1998 basketball video game developed by Left Field Productions and published by Nintendo for the Nintendo 64. The game was released in North America on April 27, 1998 and Europe on June 10, 1998. At the time of the game's release, Kobe Bryant was in his second NBA season and at age 19, was the youngest player to have a game named for him. It was followed by a sequel, NBA Courtside 2 Featuring Kobe Bryant, released in 1999 for the Nintendo 64 and Game Boy Color.

== Gameplay ==
Kobe Bryant in NBA Courtside features 5-on-5 gameplay. There are three modes: Pre-Season (Exhibition), Season, and Playoffs. In both Season and Playoffs modes, players have the option to simulate games.

Team rosters reflect the 1997-98 NBA season with two notable omissions: Chicago Bulls superstar Michael Jordan, and Golden State Warriors star Latrell Sprewell. Due to licensing agreements, a fictional player named "Roster Player #98" is used in Jordan's place. Upon the game's release, Sprewell was serving a 68-game suspension from the league due to a 1997 choking incident. Players can also be created and edited in both appearance and abilities.

== Development ==
Kobe Bryant in NBA Courtside was first announced at the November 1997 Nintendo Space World, though it did not yet have the Kobe Bryant branding and was to be titled simply "NBA Courtside".

The animations were created using motion capture.

== Reception ==
Reception

Aggregate score
Aggregator	Score
GameRankings	76%

Review scores
Publication	Score
AllGame	4/5
CNET Gamecenter	7/10
Consoles +	87%
Edge	7/10
Electronic Gaming Monthly	8.125/10
Game Informer	9/10
GameFan	89% (Note: In GameFan's viewpoint of the game, one critic gave it a score of 87, and the other 90.)
GameRevolution	B−
GamesMaster	82%
GameSpot	5.9/10
Hyper	83%
IGN	7.8/10
N64 Magazine	90%
Nintendo Power	7.8/10

Critics almost uniformly commented that Kobe Bryant in NBA Courtside, while far from perfect, was indisputably the best basketball game for the Nintendo 64 thus far. There was a consensus that the game has strong A.I. which demands skillful maneuvering from the player, and that the use of medium-res mode makes the graphics look smoother and sharper than in most Nintendo 64 games.

The game also received some criticism for its gameplay. GamePro said that controlling players can be tricky, such as when grabbing rebounds and performing free throws. Electronic Gaming Monthly's four reviewers all said the biggest problem is that when advancing with the ball, players come to an immediate stop when they touch a defender, opining that this mechanic is frustrating and unrealistic to the point of silliness. GameSpot judged that the graphics, though impressive by Nintendo 64 standards, seemed modest when compared to some contemporary basketball games for the PlayStation. Though they praised the flexibility of the camera views, the audio commentary, and the gentle learning curve of the controls, they concluded that the game as a whole was solid but failed to stand out. Electronic Gaming Monthly instead argued that the game's merits are outstanding in spite of its flaws.

IGN also recommended the game, saying that though they could not score it higher due to its issues, it outshines previous basketball games for the Nintendo 64 by so much that basketball fans would find it essential. GamePro, noting its high level of realism and selection of moves, called it "a must-buy for all N64 hoop-heads." (Note: GamePro gave the game two 4.0/5 scores for graphics and sound, 3.5/5 for control, and 4.5/5 for fun factor.) The game held a 76% at the review aggregator website GameRankings based on 13 reviews.

The game received a Player's Choice designation after selling one million copies. During the 2nd Annual Interactive Achievement Awards, NBA Courtside was a finalist by the Academy of Interactive Arts & Sciences for "Console Sports Game of the Year", which was ultimately awarded to 1080° Snowboarding.
