= NBA 3 on 3 featuring Kobe Bryant =

1999 video game

- Developer: Left Field Productions
- Publisher: Nintendo of America
- Producer: James Maxwell
- Designer: James Maxwell
- Programmers: John Brandwood; David Ashley
- Artist: Robert Hemphill
- Composer: Chris Lamb
- Platform: Game Boy Color
- Release: 6 December 1999
- Genre: Sports
- Modes: Single-player, multiplayer

NBA 3 on 3 featuring Kobe Bryant is a 1999 basketball video game developed by Left Field Productions and published by Nintendo. The game simulates play of 3x3 basketball with NBA licensed teams and players. The game was a handheld successor to the Nintendo 64 title Kobe Bryant in NBA Courtside, also by Left Field Productions. Upon release, NBA 3 on 3 received average reviews, with critics praising the customisation options but critiquing the graphics and sound.

== Gameplay ==
Gameplay screenshot

The game features several modes, including Season, Tournament, and Playoff modes. The objective of the game is to play 3x3 basketball matches and score 15 points to win. Players control basketballers on the court with offensive and defensive controls, using the A and B buttons to pass the ball and perform a fake in offensive, or attempt a steal or jump, block or rebound a shot in defensive mode. Players and matches are customisable, featuring all 29 NBA teams, including six star players per team, and their respective home courts against the 1999-2000 roster, with the additional ability to create up to six custom players for teams. Games can also be customised, with players able to change or remove rules and technicalities, such as the points, fouls, fatigue, shot clock, goal tending and back court rules. Players can also select offensive and defensive plays for their teams. The game supports the Game Link Cable for multiplayer play.

== Reception ==
Reception

Review scores
Publication	Score
AllGame	3.5/5
IGN	6/10
Nintendo Power	6.6/10
Pocket Gamer	B
Pocket Games	3.0/10

Nick Woods of Allgame enjoyed the game, although considered the graphics to be "nothing impressive" due to characters being indistinguishable, stating "it's difficult to tell when a slam dunk is being made". Similarly, Craig Harris of IGN viewed the graphics to be "not very good" due to the detail being lost on screen, also finding movement of the characters to be a "stiff task" and "slightly clumsy". Nintendo Power considered the game "intuitive and easy to play", praising the game's "responsive" controls and its appropriate animation and speed for the game for a Game Boy title, although found the sound effects to be "clunky". Describing the game as "fun" and "feature-packed", Pocket Gamer praised the customisation and inclusion of real players and teams, but felt the game had "poor graphics", with "detail lost in the tiny screen", and "awkward controls". Pocket Games critiqued the game as "half-baked" and "one to avoid", acknowledging its options and "complete roster", but considering them to fail to make up for the "lackluster graphics and gameplay" and "faceless and plain" player design.
