= Statue of Bob Miller =

Sculpture in Los Angeles, California, U.S.

- The sculpture in 2022
- Artist: Julie Rotblatt Amrany; Omri Amrany
- Subject: Bob Miller
- Location: Los Angeles, California, U.S.; 34°2′37.2″N 118°15′59.3″W

A statue of sportscaster Bob Miller by artists Julie Rotblatt Amrany and Omri Amrany is installed outside Los Angeles' Crypto.com Arena, in the U.S. state of California. He was the Los Angeles Kings' longtime broadcaster from 1973 to 2017. The sculpture was unveiled in 2018.
