= Statue of Shaquille O'Neal =

Sculpture in Los Angeles, California, U.S.

- The sculpture in 2022
- Artist: Omri Amrany; Julie Rotblatt-Amrany
- Subject: Shaquille O'Neal
- Location: Los Angeles, California, U.S.; 34°2′36.5″N 118°15′57.9″W

A bronze statue of Shaquille O'Neal by American artists Omri Amrany and Julie Rotblatt-Amrany is installed outside Crypto.com Arena in Los Angeles, California. The 9-foot-tall, 1,200 pound sculpture was installed in 2017.

== See also ==
- 2017 in art
