= Statue of Oscar De La Hoya =

Sculpture in Los Angeles, California, U.S.

- The sculpture in 2022
- Medium: Bronze sculpture
- Subject: Oscar De La Hoya
- Location: Los Angeles, California, U.S.; 34°2′37.1″N 118°15′57.7″W

A statue of Oscar De La Hoya by Erik Blome is installed outside Los Angeles' Crypto.com Arena, in the U.S. state of California. The bronze sculpture was unveiled in 2008. De La Hoya was born in East Los Angeles and was known as "The Golden Boy of boxing".
