= Statue of Magic Johnson =

Sculpture in Los Angeles, California, U.S.

- The sculpture in 2022
- Artist: Omri Amrany; Gary Tillery
- Subject: Magic Johnson
- Location: Los Angeles, California, U.S.; 34°2′37″N 118°15′57.3″W

A bronze statue of basketball player Magic Johnson by Omri Amrany and Gary Tillery is installed outside Los Angeles' Crypto.com Arena, in the U.S. state of California. The sculpture was unveiled in 2004.

== See also ==
- List of public art in Los Angeles
