= Statue of Kareem Abdul-Jabbar =

Sculpture in Los Angeles, California, U.S.

- The sculpture in 2022
- Artist: Julie Rotblatt Amrany; Omri Amrany
- Subject: Kareem Abdul-Jabbar
- Location: Los Angeles, California, U.S.; 34°2′37.1″N 118°15′56.9″W

A statue of basketball player Kareem Abdul-Jabbar by artists Julie Rotblatt-Amrany and Omri Amrany is installed outside Los Angeles' Crypto.com Arena, in the U.S. state of California. The bronze sculpture was unveiled in 2012. It depicts Abdul-Jabbar shooting his patent skyhook shot. Abdul-Jabbar was a member of the Los Angeles Lakers of the National Basketball Association from 1975 to 1989.

== See also ==
- 2012 in art
