= Statue of Elgin Baylor =

Sculpture in Los Angeles, California, U.S.

- The sculpture in 2022
- Artist: Omri Amrany; Gary Tillery
- Subject: Elgin Baylor
- Location: Los Angeles, California, U.S.; 34°2′37″N 118°15′58.5″W

A statue of American basketball player Elgin Baylor by artists Omri Amrany and Gary Tillery is installed outside Los Angeles' Crypto.com Arena, in the U.S. state of California. The bronze sculpture was unveiled in 2018. Baylor played for the Los Angeles Lakers and was the longtime general manager of the Los Angeles Clippers.
