= Crypto.com Arena =

Multi-purpose indoor arena in Los Angeles, California

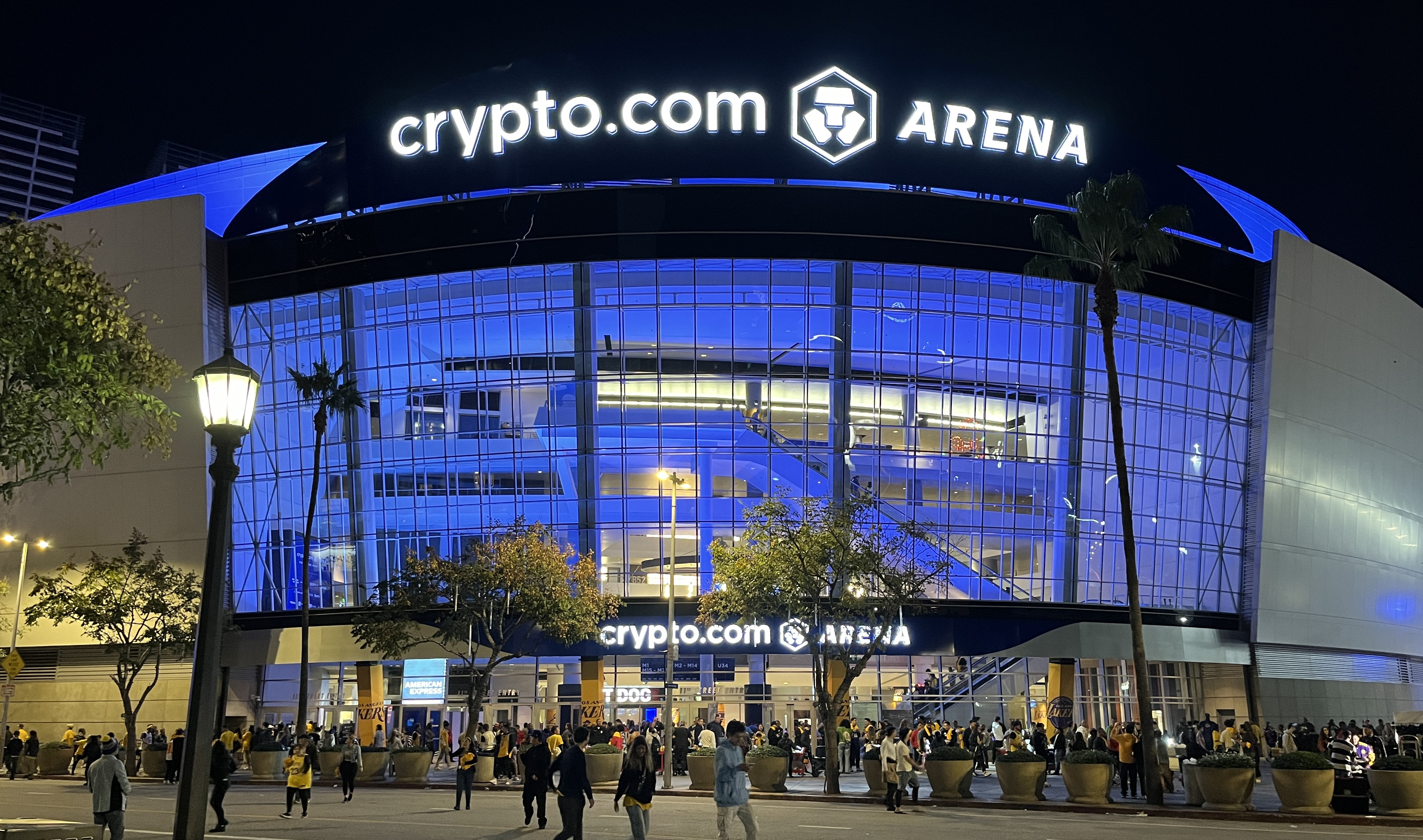
- Crypto.com Arena in 2023

- Location in the Greater Los Angeles area Location in California Location in the United States Location in North America
- Interactive map of Crypto.com Arena
- Former names: Staples Center (1999–2019)
- Address: 1111 South Figueroa Street
- Location: Los Angeles, California, U.S.
- Coordinates: 34°02′35″N 118°16′02″W
- Owner: Anschutz Entertainment Group (AEG)
- Capacity: Concerts: 20,000; Basketball: 19,079; Boxing/Wrestling: 16,000–21,000; Ice hockey: 18,145; Arena football: 16,096
- Field size: 950,000 sq ft (88,000 m^{2})
- Public transit: Pico; Metro Local 28, 81, 460

Construction
- Groundbreaking: March 31, 1997; 29 years ago
- Opened: October 17, 1999; 27 years ago
- Cost: US$375 million (US$725 million in 2025 dollars)
- Architect: NBBJ
- Structural engineers: John A Martin & Associates
- Services engineer: M-E Engineers Inc.
- General contractor: PCL Construction Services, Inc.

Tenants
- Los Angeles Kings (NHL) (1999–present); Los Angeles Lakers (NBA) (1999–present); Los Angeles Clippers (NBA) (1999–2024); Los Angeles Avengers (AFL) (2000–2008); Los Angeles Sparks (WNBA) (2001–present); Los Angeles D-Fenders (NBA D-League) (2006–2010)

Website
- cryptoarena.com

Crypto.com Arena, originally and still commonly known as Staples Center, is a multi-purpose indoor arena in downtown Los Angeles, California. Opened on October 17, 1999, it is located next to the Los Angeles Convention Center along Figueroa Street, and has since been considered a part of L.A. Live. Owned and operated by Anschutz Entertainment Group (AEG), it is the home venue of the Los Angeles Lakers of the National Basketball Association (NBA) and Los Angeles Kings of the National Hockey League (NHL)—which are both owned in part by AEG's founder Philip Anschutz, as well as the WNBA's Los Angeles Sparks.

The Los Angeles Clippers also played in the arena from 1999 to 2024, before leaving for their new arena, Intuit Dome, located in Inglewood.

From 1999 to 2024, it was the only arena in the NBA shared by two teams, as well as one of only three North American professional sports venues (alongside SoFi Stadium in nearby Inglewood, and New Jersey's MetLife Stadium) to have hosted two teams from the same league. The venue is also frequently used for major concerts, and has been the most frequent host of the Grammy Awards ceremony since its opening.

Crypto.com Arena will host the artistic gymnastics competition and boxing finals during the 2028 Summer Olympics.

== Description ==
Crypto.com Arena has 950,000 square feet (88,257.9 m^{2}) of total space, with a 94-foot (28.7 m) by 200-foot (61.0 m) arena floor. It stands 150 feet (45.7 m) tall. The arena seats up to 19,067 for basketball, 18,145 for ice hockey, and around 20,000 for concerts or other sporting events. Two-thirds of the arena's seating, including 2,500 club seats, are in the lower bowl. There are also 160 luxury suites, including 15 event suites, on three levels between the lower and upper bowls. The arena's attendance record is held by the fight between World WBA Welterweight Champion Antonio Margarito and Shane Mosley with a crowd of 20,820, set on January 25, 2009.

=== Star Plaza ===
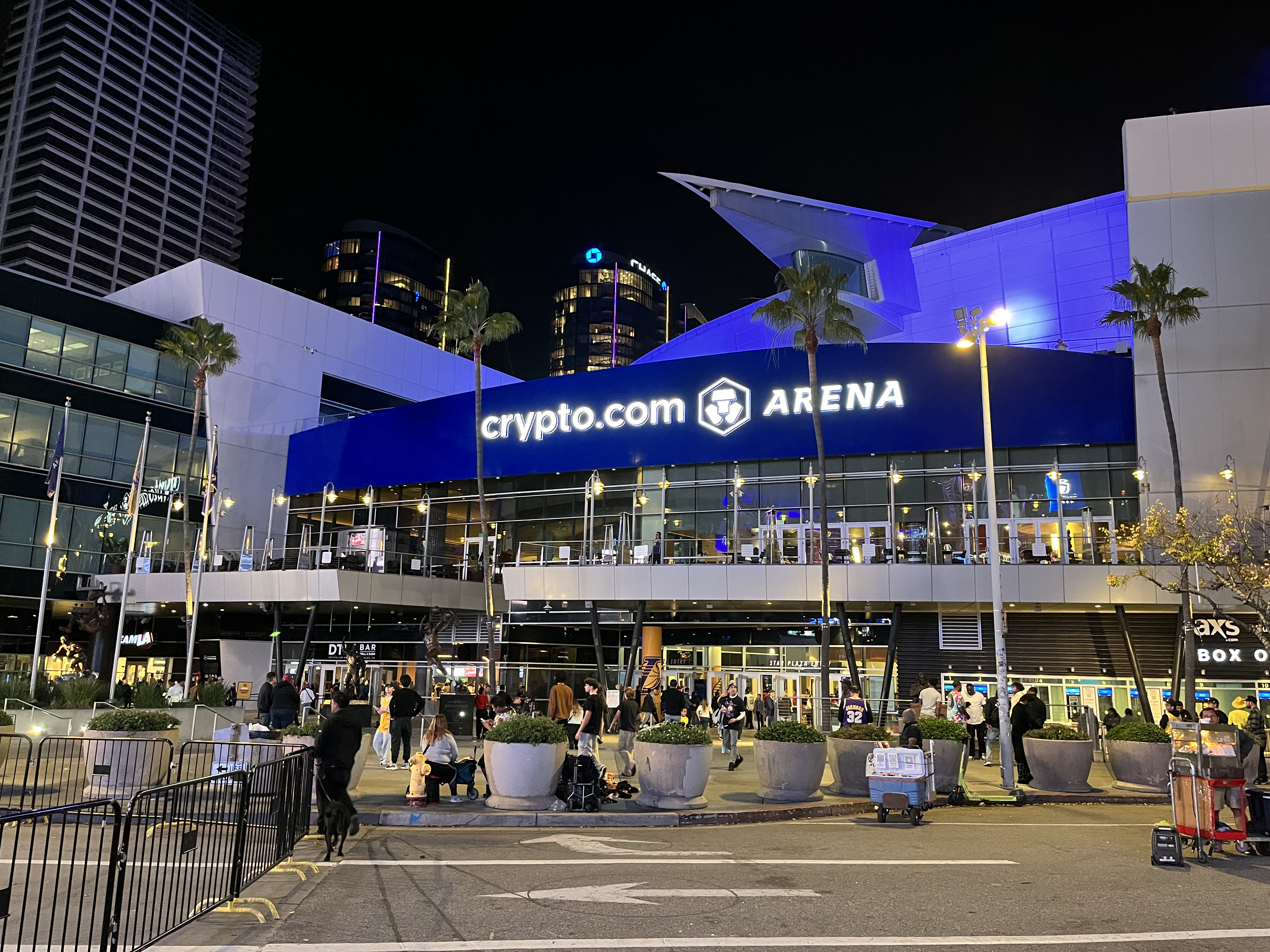
Star Plaza entrance at Crypto.com Arena

Outside the arena at the Star Plaza are 14 statues of famous Los Angeles athletes and broadcasters. Additionally, the Los Angeles Kings Monument was erected in Star Plaza in 2016. The Kobe and Gianna Bryant Memorial Statue was erected in 2024. A third statue of Kobe Bryant, honoring his number 24, is planned.

Following is a list of statues on display:

Name	Sport	Date	Notes
Wayne Gretzky	Ice hockey	October 9, 2002	See also: Statue of Wayne Gretzky Played for the Los Angeles Kings at The Forum from 1988 to 1996
Magic Johnson	Basketball	February 11, 2004	See also: Statue of Magic Johnson Played for the Los Angeles Lakers at The Forum from 1979 to 1991 and in 1996
Oscar De La Hoya	Boxing	December 1, 2008,	See also: Statue of Oscar De La Hoya East Los Angeles, California native
Chick Hearn	Basketball	April 20, 2010	See also: Statue of Chick Hearn Long-time Lakers broadcaster (1961–2002)
Jerry West	Basketball	February 17, 2011	See also: Statue of Jerry West Played for the Lakers from 1960 to 1974 and coached the Lakers from 1976 to 1979
Kareem Abdul-Jabbar	Basketball	November 16, 2012	See also: Statue of Kareem Abdul-Jabbar Played for the Lakers at The Forum from 1975 to 1989
Luc Robitaille	Ice hockey	March 7, 2015	See also: Statue of Luc Robitaille Played for the Kings from 1986 to 1994, 1997 to 2001, and 2003 to 2006
Shaquille O'Neal	Basketball	March 24, 2017	See also: Statue of Shaquille O'Neal Played for the Lakers from 1996 to 2004
Bob Miller	Ice hockey	January 13, 2018	See also: Statue of Bob Miller Long-time Kings broadcaster (1973–2017)
Elgin Baylor	Basketball	April 6, 2018	See also: Statue of Elgin Baylor Played for the Lakers from 1958 to 1971
Dustin Brown	Ice hockey	February 11, 2023	Main article: Statue of Dustin Brown Played for the Kings from 2003 to 2022
Kobe Bryant	Basketball	February 8, 2024	Main article: Statue of Kobe Bryant Played for the Lakers from 1996 to 2016
Kobe and Gianna Bryant	Basketball	August 2, 2024	Main article: Statue of Kobe and Gianna Bryant Date represents both of Bryant's uniform numbers (8 and 24) and Gianna's number 2.
Pat Riley	Basketball	February 22, 2026	Played for the Lakers from 1970 to 1975 and coached the Lakers from 1979 to 1990.
Lisa Leslie	Basketball	September 20, 2026	Played for the Sparks from 1997 to 2009.

== History ==
Staples Center logo (1999–2019)

The arena has been referred to as "the deal that almost wasn't." Long before construction broke ground, plans for the arena were negotiated between elected city officials and real estate developers Edward P. Roski of Majestic Realty and Philip Anschutz. Roski and Anschutz had acquired the Los Angeles Kings in 1995 and in 1996 began looking for a new home for their team, which then played at the Great Western Forum in Inglewood.

Majestic Realty Co. and AEG were scouring the Los Angeles area for available land to develop an arena when they were approached by Steve Soboroff, then president of the LA Recreation and Parks Commission. Soboroff requested that they consider building the arena in downtown Los Angeles adjacent to the convention center. This proposal intrigued Roski and Anschutz, and soon a plan to develop the arena was devised.

Months of negotiations ensued between Anschutz and city officials, with Roski and John Semcken of Majestic Realty Co. spearheading the negotiations for the real estate developers. The negotiations grew contentious at times and the real estate developers threatened to pull out altogether on more than one occasion. The main opposition came from Councilman Joel Wachs, who opposed utilizing public funds to subsidize the proposed project, and councilwoman Rita Walters, who objected to parts of it.

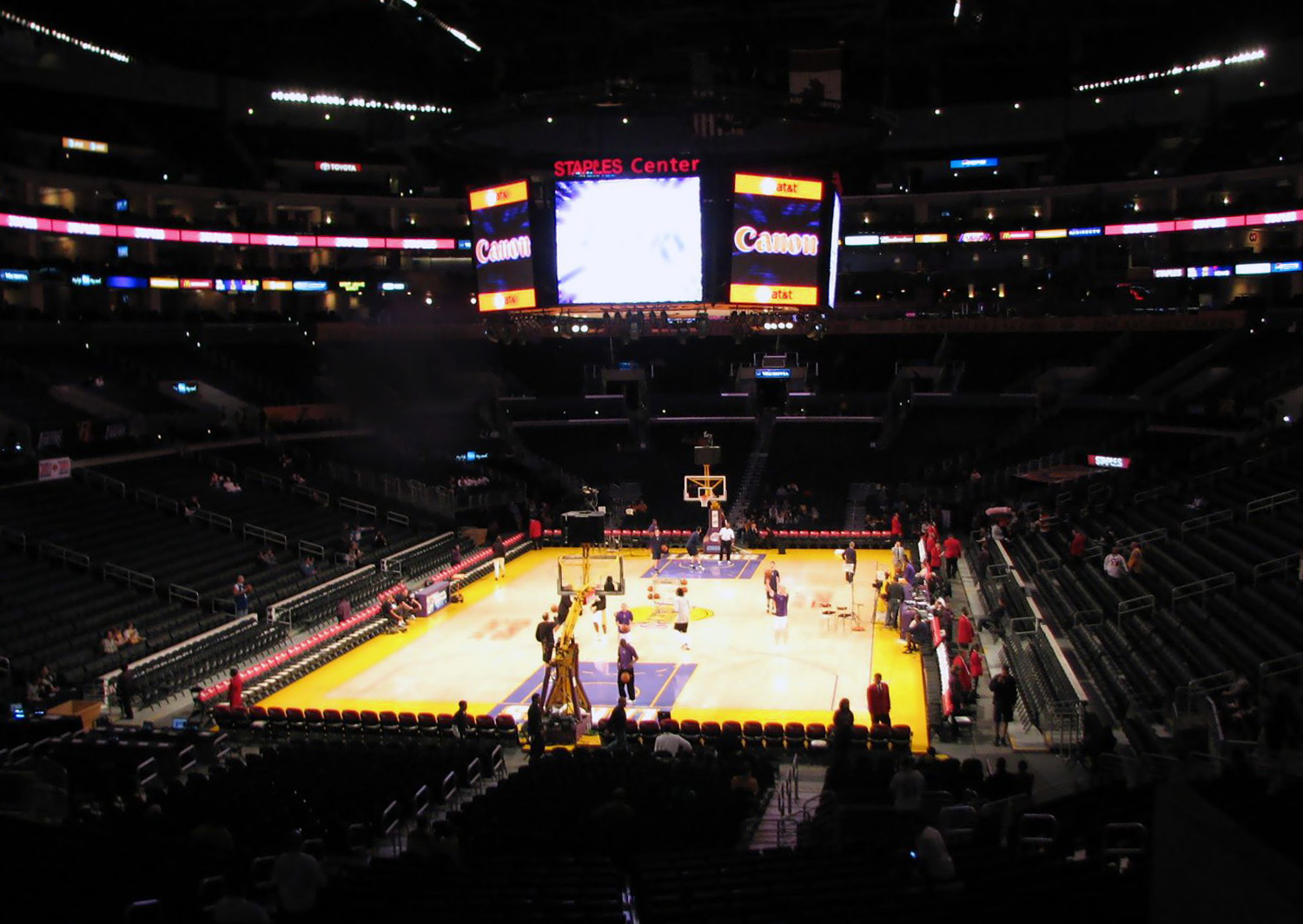
During a Lakers pre-game warm-up prior to the installation of the new scoreboard, and after the implementation of a new lighting system

Ultimately, the developers and city leaders reached an agreement, and in 1997, construction broke ground on the new building, which opened two years later. It was financed privately at a cost of US$375 million and was named for the office-supply company Staples Inc., which was one of the center's corporate sponsors that paid for naming rights. Staples' 10-year naming rights deal was extended for another 10 years in 2009. The arena opened on October 17, 1999, with a Bruce Springsteen & The E Street Band concert as its inaugural event. The first Kings games at the arena was on October 20, 1999 where the Kings tied 2–2 in overtime against the Boston Bruins. The first Clippers game at the arena was on November 2, 1999 where the Clippers lost 92–104 to the Seattle SuperSonics. The first Lakers game at the arena was on November 3, 1999 where the Lakers won 103–88 against the Vancouver Grizzlies.

On October 21, 2009, the arena celebrated its tenth anniversary. To commemorate the occasion, the venue's official web site nominated 25 of the arena's greatest moments from its first ten years with fans voting on the top ten.

The Los Angeles Avengers of the Arena Football League (AFL) and the South Bay Lakers of the NBA G League were also tenants of Staples Center; the Avengers folded in 2009, and the D-Fenders moved to the Lakers' practice facility at the Toyota Sports Center in El Segundo, California for the 2011–12 season.

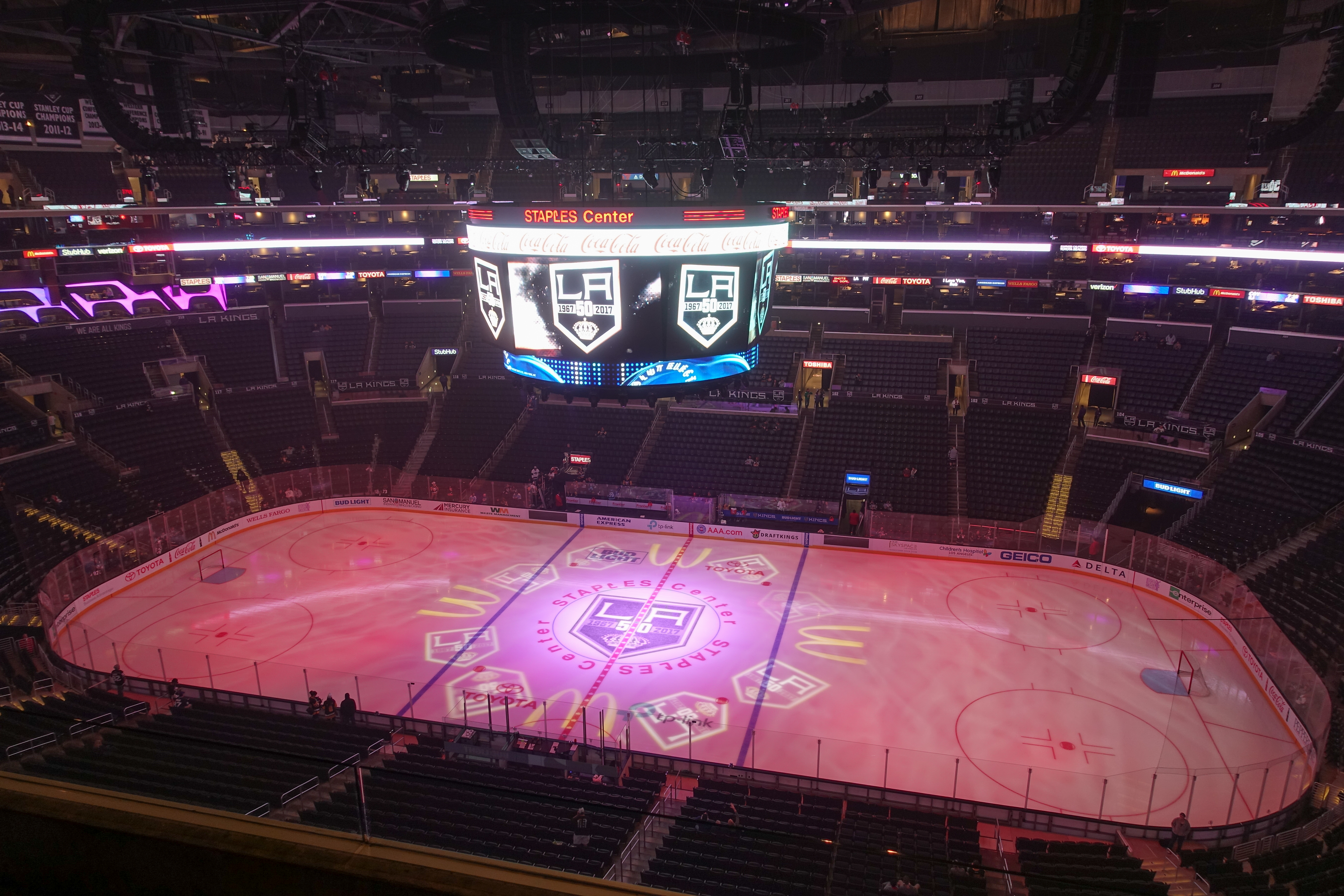
The arena in 2016, prior to a Kings game

During the 2010 NBA and NHL offseason, the arena was renovated with refurbished locker rooms for the Lakers, Kings, and Clippers, and the installation of a new US$10 million HD center-hung video scoreboard and jumbotron, replacing the original one that had been in place since the building opened in 1999. The Panasonic Live 4HD scoreboard was officially unveiled on September 22, 2010, as AEG and Staples Center executives, as well as player representatives from the Lakers (Sasha Vujacic), Clippers (Craig Smith), and Kings (Matt Greene) were on hand for the presentation.

On January 15, 2018, in the aftermath of an NBA basketball game between the Houston Rockets and the Los Angeles Clippers, point guard Chris Paul utilized a secret tunnel (connecting the away team's locker room to the backdoor of the Clippers locker room) to confront former Clipper teammates Austin Rivers and Blake Griffin. Paul was joined by teammates Trevor Ariza, James Harden, and Gerald Green to confront the opponents, which only resulted in verbal altercations.

A number of media outlets picked up on a phrase used by some, referring to the arena as "The House That Kobe Built", due to his historic 20-year career with the Lakers. On August 24, 2020, Los Angeles City Council president Herb Wesson announced a proposal to rename the stretch of Figueroa Street around Staples Center to "Kobe Bryant Boulevard".

The Clippers broke ground on a new arena in Inglewood, California, known as Intuit Dome, which became its new home arena in 2024.

It was announced that the naming rights to Staples Center had been acquired by Singapore-based cryptocurrency exchange Crypto.com, renaming it Crypto.com Arena effective After December 31, 2019 (with the changeover coinciding with the Lakers' nationally televised Christmas Day game). The deal was reported to be valued at $700 million over 20 years, in comparison to the $116 million paid by Staples under its previous 20-year agreement—making it the most valuable naming rights contract in all of sports. The name change was met with opposition and many fans still refer to this arena as Staples Center. Former Lakers star Shaquille O'Neal stated on his podcast that he was "glad" that the arena's name had been changed, as he felt that "Staples Center belongs to Shaq and Kobe forever."

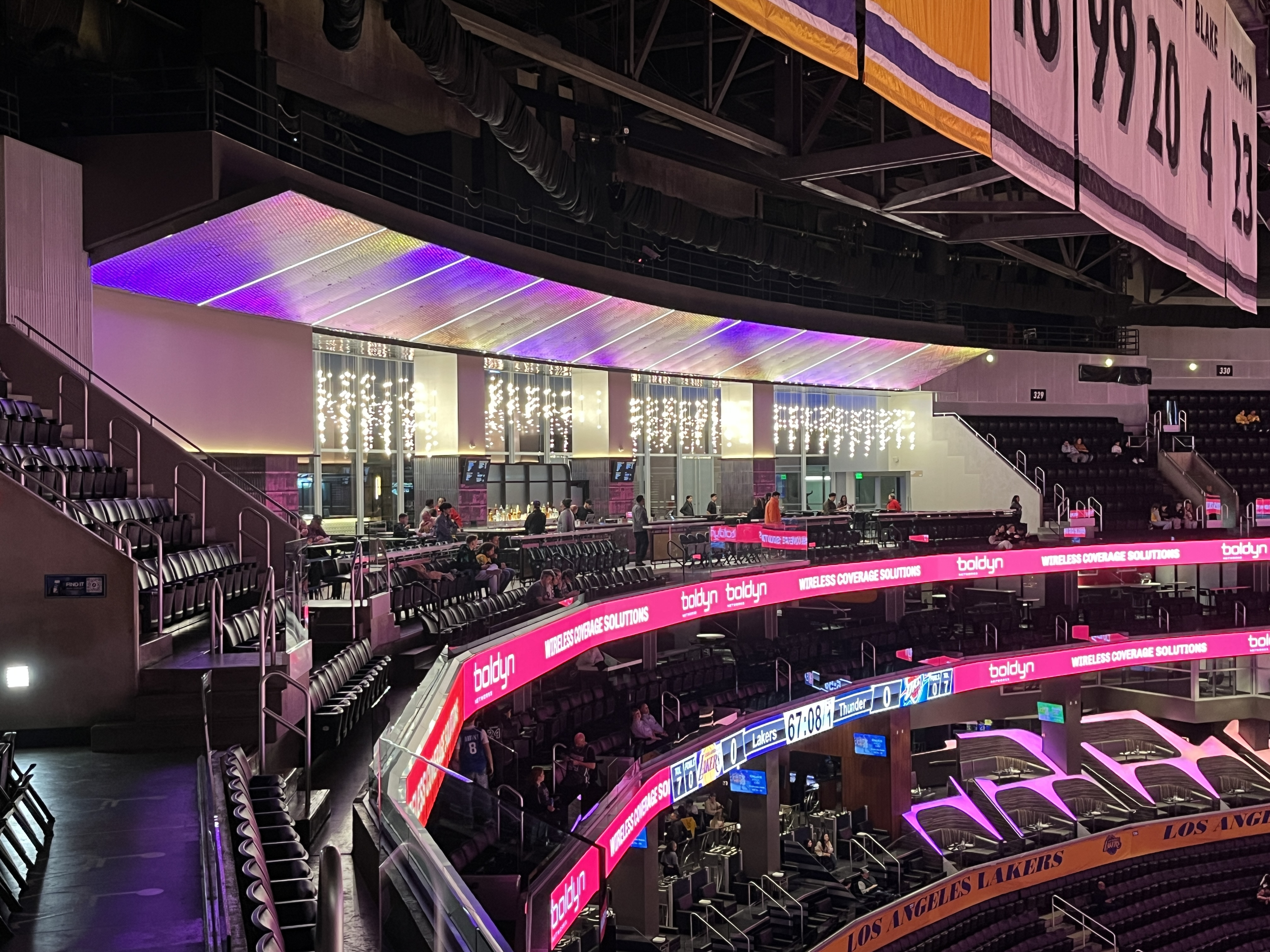
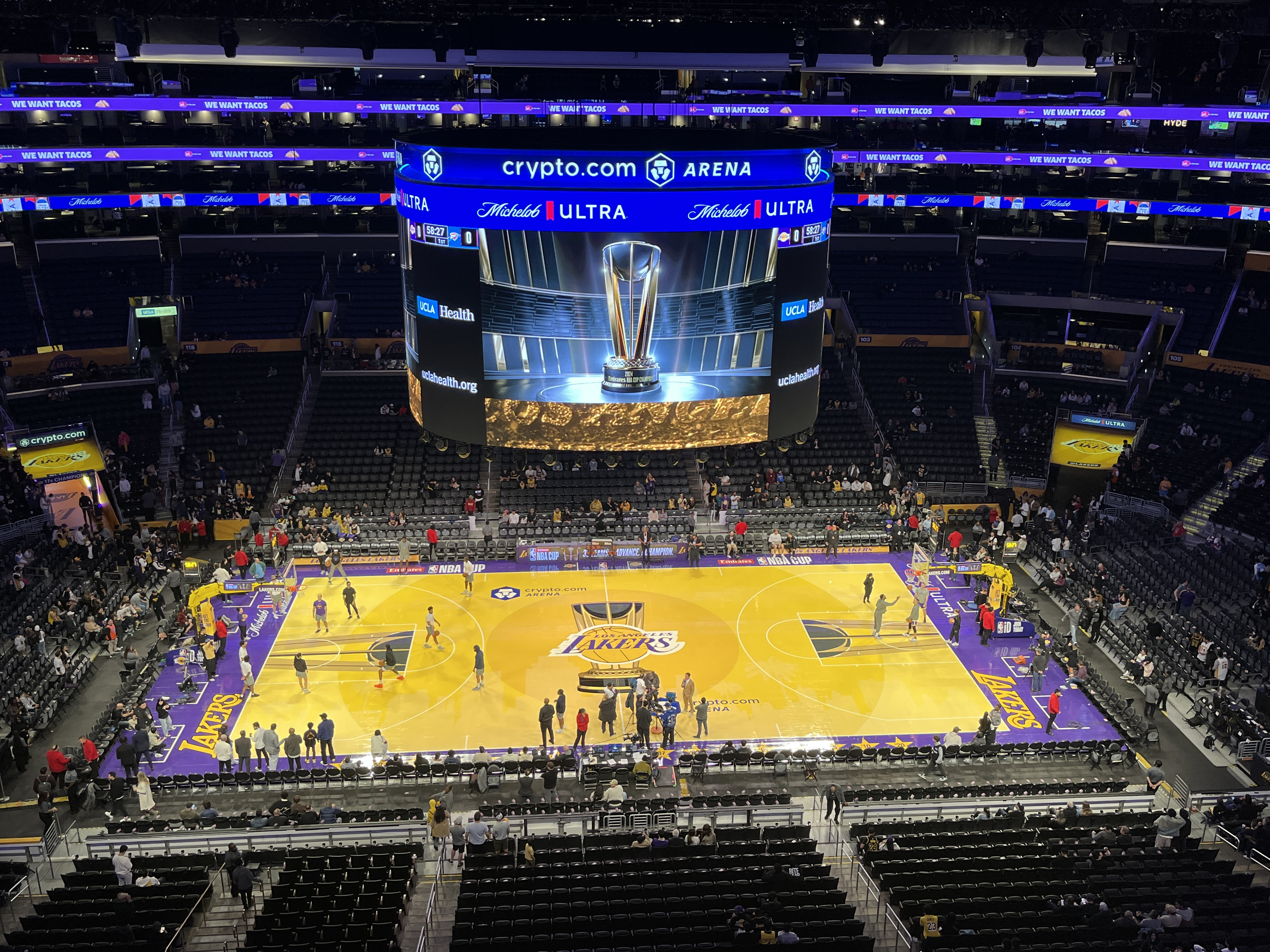
2024 renovations at Crypto.com Arena - featuring the new UCTER section (left) and new hanging scoreboard (right)

In 2022, the arena began to undergo a multi-phase renovation, expected to be completed in 2024; the first phase over the 2022 NBA and NHL offseason included new 4K HDR video boards and ribbon displays, and updated concessions. There are plans for the City View Terrace to be converted into an indoor outdoor deck, a new area known as the "Tunnel Club", Chick Hearn Court to be converted into a pedestrian plaza between the arena and the rest of L.A. Live, and updated player facilities such as locker rooms.

== Events ==
=== Music ===
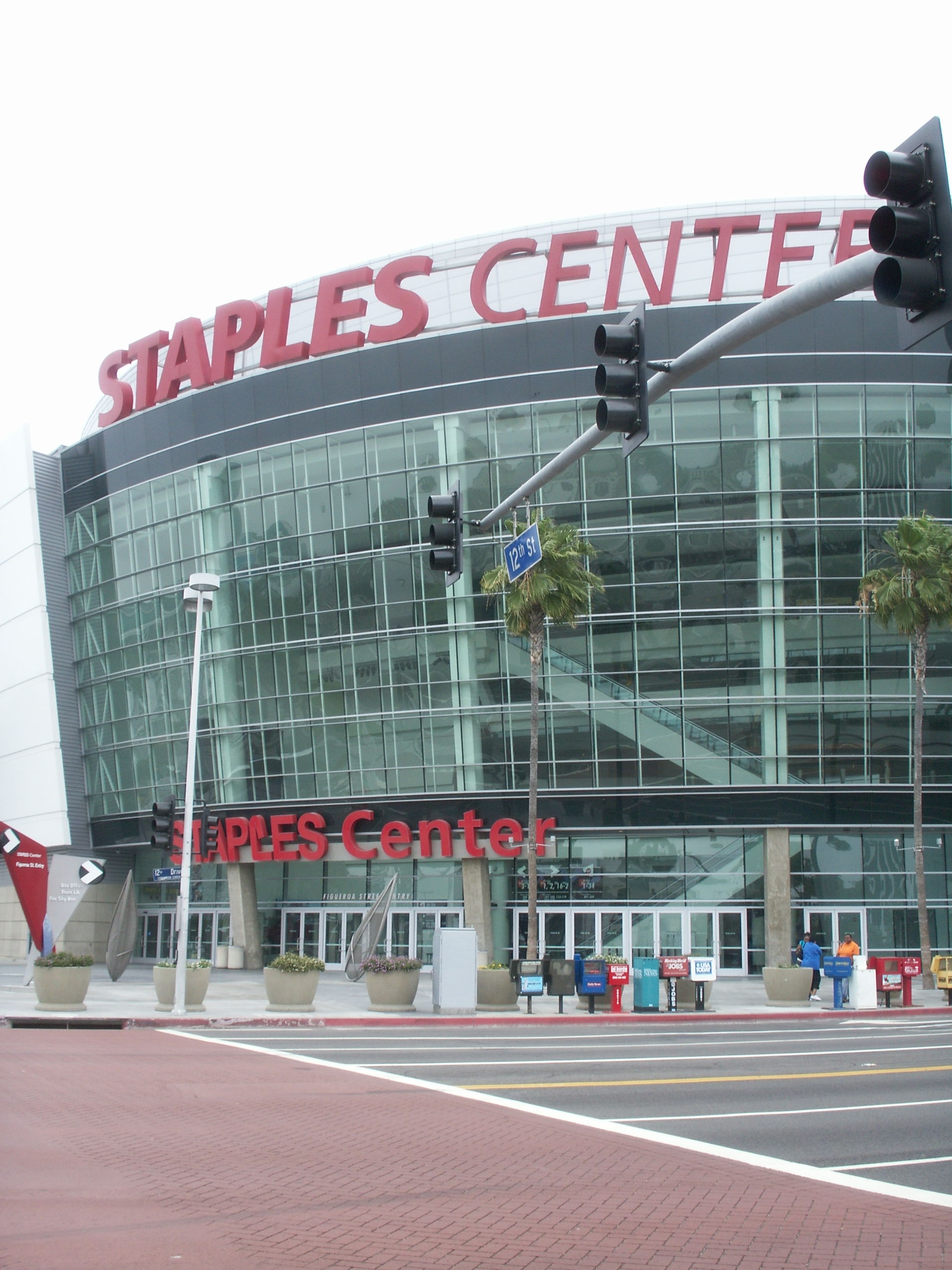
Outside the arena in 2006

Bruce Springsteen & The E Street Band were the first act to perform at the venue on its opening in 1999. Dave Matthews Band famously played the venue twice in 2008, despite the first show being the day of founding member and saxophonist LeRoi Moore's death.

After the American singer Michael Jackson died on June 25, 2009, a televised memorial service was held at the arena on July 7. Its operator, AEG, had promoted the This Is It concert residency that Jackson had been scheduled to perform at The O2 Arena in London. Jackson had been rehearsing at the arena in the weeks prior to his death; he last had rehearsed there approximately 12 hours before his death (on the same day).

It hosted the 1st Annual Latin Grammy Awards in 2000 and the 2012 MTV Video Music Awards. In 2011, Jenni Rivera became the first female regional Mexican musician to perform a sell-out at the arena.

Lady Gaga has performed three nights of her Monster Ball Tour at Crypto.com Arena, August 11–12, 2011. Later on brang the third date March 28, 2011 celebrating her birthday at the arena. On January 20–21, 2013 she brang her Born This Way Ball Tour. On July 21–22, 2014 she brang her artRAVE: The ARTPOP Ball marking her last shows at this arena.

Taylor Swift has performed 16 sellouts at Crypto.com Arena—the most of any performer at the venue. On August 21, 2015, prior to one of her performances on the 1989 World Tour, Kobe Bryant presented Swift with a banner commemorating this achievement, which was hung in the arena's rafters. The Taylor Swift banner, however, became the subject of a curse among Lakers and Kings fans, who suspected that the banner was contributing to their teams' respective playoff droughts. Eventually, the Kings began to hide the Taylor Swift banner during home games, and the banner was taken down entirely in December 2020.

Mexican musicians Gloria Trevi and Alejandra Guzmán played two sellout shows at the arena in 2017. Rapper Nipsey Hussle's memorial service was held at the venue on April 11, 2019. As part of Super Bowl LVI festivities, the arena hosted the "Super Bowl Music Fest" in February 2022, headlined by Halsey, Machine Gun Kelly, Blake Shelton and Gwen Stefani, Miley Cyrus, and Green Day. As part of the 2026 FIFA World Cup festivities, the arena hosted a "countdown concert" on June 10, 2026 and featured Major Lazer, Davido, Ava Max, and Bia.

K-Pop girl group LE SSERAFIM is set to perform at the arena for the Pureflow Tour on September 16, 2026.

==== Grammy Awards ====
The annual Grammy Awards ceremony has been held at Crypto.com Arena since 2000, with the exception of 2003, 2018, 2021 and 2022. As of 2026, the venue has hosted the Grammy Awards 23 times, hosting more than any other venue in the history of the Grammy Awards.

==== KCON ====
The arena hosted the concert portion of the U.S. legs of KCON 2022 and 2024, held from 20 to 21 August 2022 and 26–28 July 2024, respectively.

=== Sports ===
Staples Center (now Crypto.com Arena) was the host venue of the 2011 NBA All-Star Game, February 2011

The venue opened in 1999 as the home of the Los Angeles Lakers and Los Angeles Clippers (NBA), and Los Angeles Kings of the NHL. The Los Angeles Sparks of the WNBA joined in 2001, while the Los Angeles D-Fenders of the NBA D-League joined in 2006. It became home to the Los Angeles Avengers of the Arena Football League in 2000 until the team's discontinuation in 2009.

On June 21, 2003, the arena hosted the boxing event Lennox Lewis vs. Vitali Klitschko, which was Lennox Lewis' final title defense before retiring. Klitschko was leading on the scorecards however the fight ended as a 6th-round TKO due to a sustained cut over Klitschko's eye.

Since its opening day, the arena has hosted seven NBA Finals series with the Lakers, the 2012 and 2014 Stanley Cup Final, five WNBA Finals, the 2002 U.S. Figure Skating Championships, the 52nd and 62nd NHL All-Star game, three NBA All-Star Games (2004, 2011 and 2018), the Pac-10 Conference men's basketball tournament (2002–12), the WTA Tour Championships (2002–05), UFC 60: Hughes vs. Gracie in 2006, UFC 104: Machida vs. Shogun in 2009, UFC 184: Rousey vs. Zingano in 2015, UFC 227: Dillashaw vs. Garbrandt 2 in 2018, UFC 331: Van vs. Pantoja 2 in 2026, the 2009 World Figure Skating Championships, the Summer X Games indoor competitions (2003–13), and several HBO Championship Boxing matches.

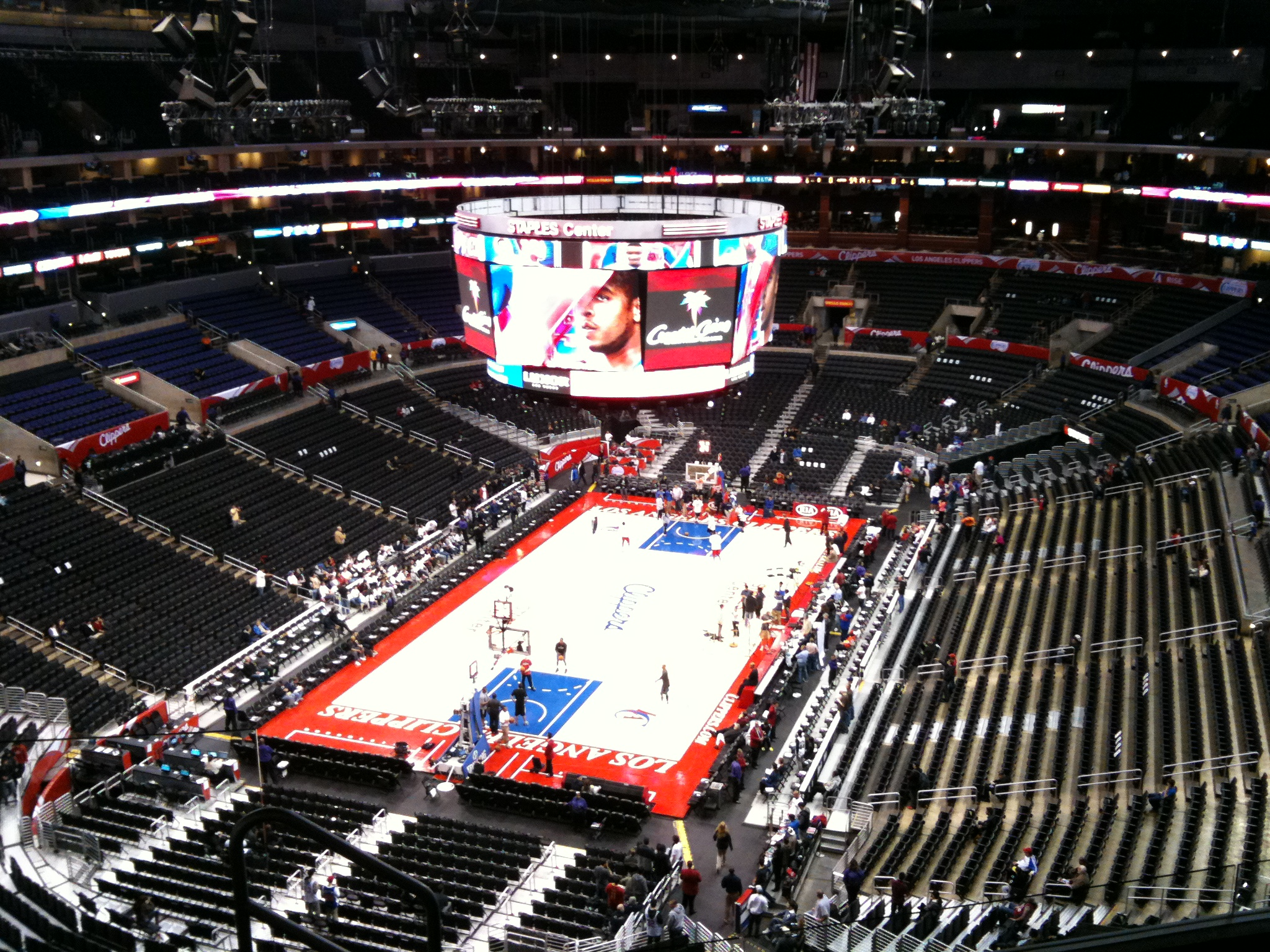
Before a Clippers game in March 2011

On January 22, 2006, Los Angeles Lakers player Kobe Bryant scored a career-high 81 points in the Crypto.com Arena against the Toronto Raptors, the third-highest number of points scored in a single game in NBA history, behind Wilt Chamberlain's 100-point performance and Bam Adebayo's 83-point game. Of the team's six NBA championships since moving to the venue, the Lakers have celebrated their 2000 and 2010 victories at Crypto.com Arena with series-winning victories at home.

Prior to the 2006–07 NBA season, the lighting inside the arena was modified for Lakers games. The lights were focused only on the court itself (hence the promotional Lights Out campaign), reminiscent of the Lakers' early years at The Forum. The initial fan reaction was positive and has been a fixture on home games since. The Daktronics see-through shot clock was first installed prior to the 2008–09 NBA season. The Clippers adopted the new see-through shot clock prior to the 2010–11 NBA season. For Sparks games, the court used is named after Sparks player Lisa Leslie, and was officially named prior to the 2009 home opener against the Shock on June 23, 2006.

The Los Angeles Kings hosted the 2010 NHL entry draft at the arena in June 2010. In 2012, the Clippers, Kings, and Lakers all advanced to their leagues' respective playoffs, with the Kings ultimately playing their first Stanley Cup Final at the arena; on June 11, the Kings defeated the New Jersey Devils in game six to win their first Stanley Cup in franchise history.

The Lakers unveiled a new hardwood court before their preseason game on October 13, 2012. Taking a cue from soccer clubs, the primary center court logo was adorned with 16 stars, representing the first 16 championships the Lakers franchise had won. A 17th star was added to the court and unveiled before their regular season opener on December 22, 2020, to represent the franchise winning its 17th championship in the 2020 NBA Finals.

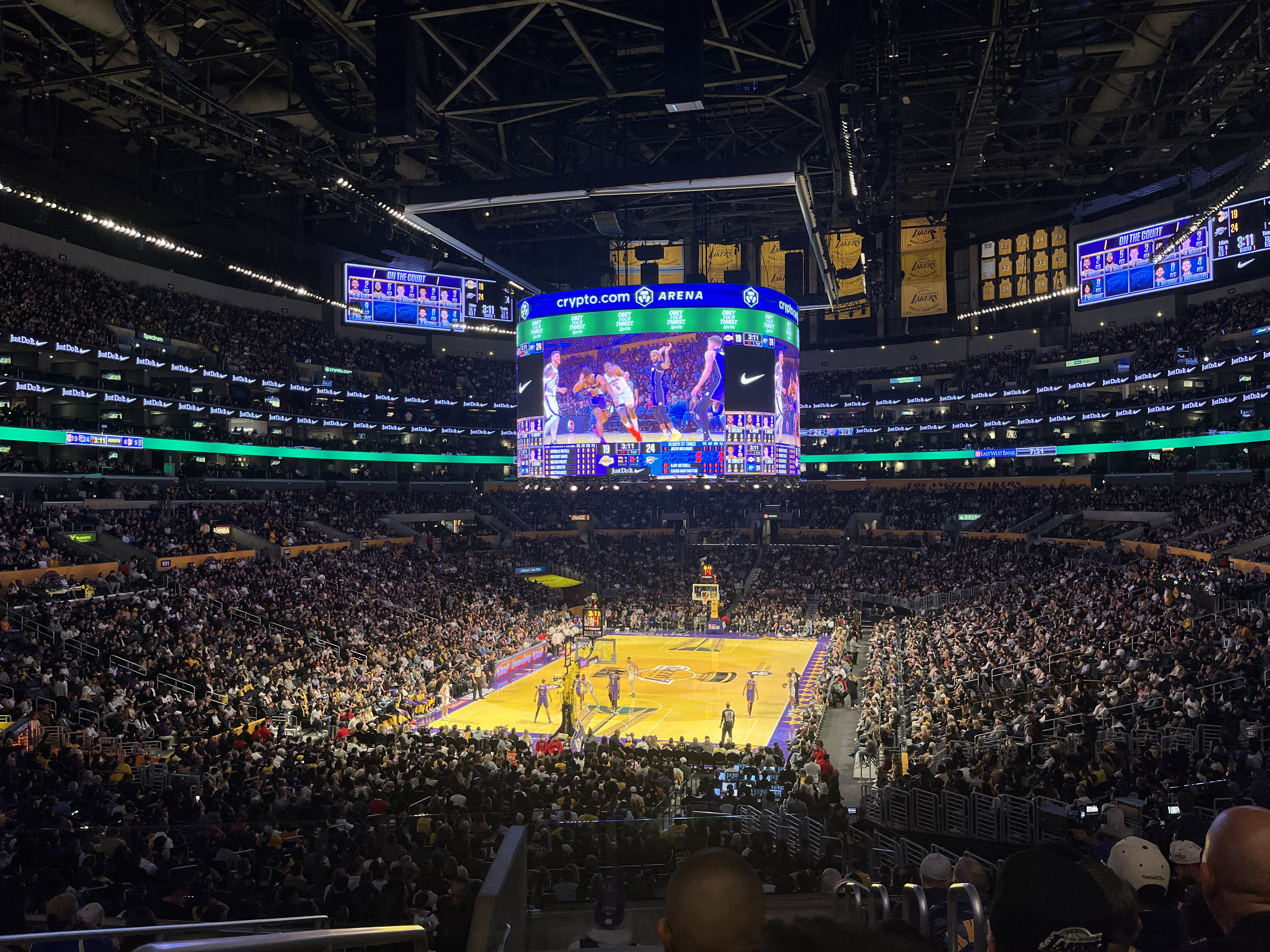
During a Lakers game against the Oklahoma City Thunder in November 2024

Crypto.com Arena has hosted the following championship events:

- NBA Finals:
  - 2000: On June 19, 2000, the Lakers defeated the Indiana Pacers 116–111 in game 6, which took place at home, to win their twelfth championship title. This was also notable for being their first championship since 1988.
  - 2001: The Lakers hosted games 1 and 2 versus the Philadelphia 76ers. They eventually won the series in five games.
  - 2002: The Lakers hosted games 1 and 2 versus the New Jersey Nets. They eventually swept the series in four games.
  - 2004: The Lakers hosted games 1 and 2 versus the Detroit Pistons. They eventually lost the series in five games.
  - 2008: The Lakers hosted games 3, 4 and 5 versus the Boston Celtics. They eventually lost the series in six games.
  - 2009: The Lakers hosted games 1 and 2 versus the Orlando Magic. They eventually won the series in five games.
  - 2010: On June 17, 2010, the Lakers defeated the Boston Celtics 83–79 in game 7, which took place at home, to win their sixteenth championship title.
- Stanley Cup Final:
  - 2012: On June 11, 2012, the Kings captured their first Stanley Cup in franchise history after defeating the New Jersey Devils 6–1 in game 6.
  - 2014: On June 13, 2014, the Kings captured their second Stanley Cup in franchise history after defeating the New York Rangers 3–2 in double overtime of game 5.
- WNBA Finals:
  - 2001: The Sparks hosted game 2 versus the Charlotte Sting where they captured their first WNBA championship.
  - 2002: The Sparks hosted game 2 versus the New York Liberty where they captured their second WNBA championship.
  - 2003: The Sparks hosted game 1 versus the Detroit Shock. They eventually lost the series in three games.
  - 2016: The Sparks hosted game 4 versus the Minnesota Lynx (game 3 was played at Galen Center due to a scheduling conflict with the Kings). They eventually won the series in five games to capture their third WNBA championship.
  - 2017: The Sparks hosted games 3 and 4 versus the Minnesota Lynx. They eventually lost the series in five games.

In 2018, the arena hosted Monster Jam for the first time. In 2019, the PBR Unleash the Beast Series hosted its Iron Cowboy event at the arena, marking the first PBR event to be held there. On June 9, 2019, the ACE Family hosted a charity basketball game against singer Chris Brown.

On November 9, 2019, the arena hosted KSI vs. Logan Paul II, a boxing event headlined by a rematch between the two YouTubers. On November 28, 2020, the arena hosted the boxing event Mike Tyson vs. Roy Jones Jr.

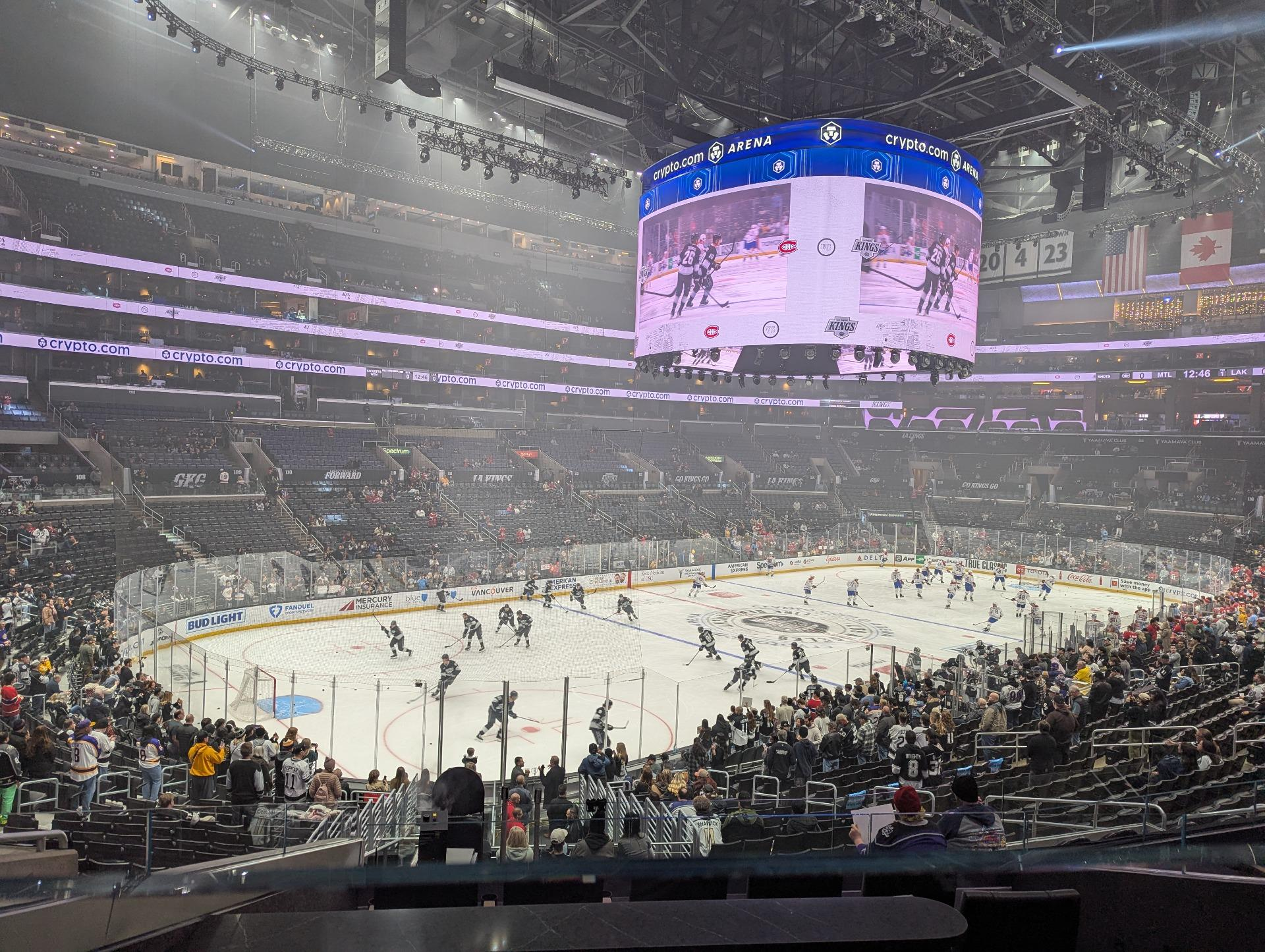
During a Kings game against the Montreal Canadiens in February 2025

On April 14, 2024, the Clippers played their final regular season home game at the arena, against the Houston Rockets, losing 105–116. On May 1, 2024, the Clippers played their final playoff home game at the arena, against the Dallas Mavericks in the first round of the playoffs, losing 93–123.

The Professional Women's Hockey League (PWHL) played its first game in Los Angeles at the arena on February 20, 2027 between the Montreal Victoire and Boston Fleet.

==== 2028 Summer Olympics and Paralympics ====
Crypto.com Arena will host artistic gymnastics, trampoline and boxing finals during the 2028 Summer Olympics. Per IOC rules, the venue must be referred to under a generic name for the duration of the Games.

The wheelchair basketball competition will be held at the arena during the 2028 Summer Paralympics.

=== Esports ===
In 2013 and 2016, the arena hosted the finals of the League of Legends World Championship.

=== Professional wrestling ===
Along with hosting many episodes of Raw and SmackDown, such as the latter's 20th anniversary season premiere on October 4, 2019, Crypto.com Arena has also hosted the following WWE pay-per-views:

- Unforgiven 2002
- Judgment Day 2004
- WrestleMania 21
- No Way Out 2007
- SummerSlam (2009, 2010, 2011, 2012, 2013, 2014)
- Hell in a Cell 2015
- No Mercy 2017
- NXT TakeOver: WarGames 2018
- Survivor Series 2018
- NXT Stand & Deliver 2023

A broadcast of WCW Monday Nitro was held at the arena on January 24, 2000.

The arena hosted SmackDown and the 2023 WWE Hall of Fame induction ceremony on March 31 as well as NXT Stand & Deliver on April 1 and Raw on April 3, as part of WrestleMania 39 weekend.

The arena hosted All Elite Wrestling (AEW)'s Revolution pay-per-view on March 9, 2025, marking the first time the venue has hosted a non-WWE pro wrestling event in over 25 years.

=== Politics ===
The 2000 Democratic National Convention was held at the venue.

=== Celebrity memorials ===
The arena has hosted three public memorials for celebrities.

First, it was for the memorial of musician Michael Jackson following his death on June 25, 2009. The memorial took place on July 7, 2009. It included eulogies or performances from Smokey Robinson, Mariah Carey, Macaulay Culkin, Trey Lorenz, Queen Latifah, Lionel Richie, John Mayer, Stevie Wonder, Kobe Bryant, Magic Johnson, Jennifer Hudson, Berry Gordy, Rev. Jesse Jackson, Rev. Al Sharpton, Brooke Shields, Martin Luther King III, Bernice King, Sheila Jackson-Lee, Usher, Shaheen Jafargholi, Kenny Ortega, Judith Hill, Orianthi Panagaris, his siblings Marlon, Jermaine, and Janet, and his daughter Paris.

In 2019, a memorial took place at the arena for rapper Nipsey Hussle following his death on March 31, 2019. The memorial service took place on April 11, 2019. Attendees and performers included rapper YG, Stevie Wonder who sang "Tears in Heaven", his wife Lauren London, Jhené Aiko, Anthony Anderson, Marsha Ambrosius and Snoop Dogg who gave a eulogy. A hurst procession after the service followed through various South Los Angeles communities.

In 2020, it served as the location for the public memorial of basketball player Kobe Bryant following the death of him and his daughter Gianna, among others, in the 2020 Calabasas helicopter crash. It took place on February 24 (2/24, a reference to Gianna's and Kobe's basketball numbers) 2020. It was hosted by Jimmy Kimmel and included eulogies from his wife Vanessa, Shaquille O'Neal, Michael Jordan, Rob Pelinka, Diana Taurasi, Geno Auriemma, and Sabrina Ionescu.

== Awards and recognitions ==
Staples Center was named Best Major Concert Venue for 1998 and Arena of the Year for 1999, 2000 and 2001 by Pollstar Magazine and has been nominated each year since 2000. In February 2013, PETA named the arena the most "vegetarian-friendly" arena in the NBA.

== See also ==
- List of indoor arenas in the United States
- List of indoor arenas by capacity
- List of basketball arenas
- List of music venues in Los Angeles, a list of other music venues in Los Angeles.
- L.A. Live

Events and tenants
Preceded by Kia Forum	Home of the Los Angeles Kings; 1999–present	Succeeded by Current
Preceded by Kia Forum	Home of the Los Angeles Lakers; 1999–present	Succeeded by Current
Preceded by Los Angeles Memorial Sports Arena	Home of the Los Angeles Clippers; 1999–2024	Succeeded by Intuit Dome
Preceded by First arena	Home of the Los Angeles Avengers; 2000–2008	Succeeded by Final venue
Preceded by Kia Forum	Home of the Los Angeles Sparks; 2001–present	Succeeded by Current
Preceded by Pepsi Center; Bridgestone Arena	Venues of the NHL All-Star Game; 2002; 2017	Succeeded by Office Depot Center; Amalie Arena
Preceded by Olympiahalle	WTA Tour Championships venues 2002–2005	Succeeded by Madrid Arena
Preceded by Philips Arena; Cowboys Stadium	Venues of the NBA All-Star Game; 2004; 2011	Succeeded by Pepsi Center; Amway Center
Preceded by Madison Square Garden	Host of WrestleMania; 2005 (21)	Succeeded by Allstate Arena
Preceded by Nokia Theatre	Venues of the MTV Video Music Awards; 2012	Succeeded by Barclays Center
Preceded by Conseco Fieldhouse	Permanent venue of WWE SummerSlam; 2009; 2010; 2011; 2012; 2013; 2014	Succeeded by Barclays Center
Preceded by Mercedes-Benz Arena; Berlin	League of Legends World Championship; Final Venue; 2016	Succeeded by Beijing National Stadium; Beijing
