= Statue of Jerry West =

Sculpture in Los Angeles, California, U.S.

- The sculpture in 2022
- Artist: Omri Amrany; Julie Rotblatt Amrany
- Subject: Jerry West
- Location: Los Angeles, California, U.S.; 34°2′36.9″N 118°15′58.4″W

A bronze statue of Jerry West by Omri Amrany and Julie Rotblatt Amrany is installed outside Los Angeles' Crypto.com Arena, in the U.S. state of California. The sculpture was unveiled in 2011.
