= 2020 Calabasas helicopter crash =

2020 helicopter accident in California

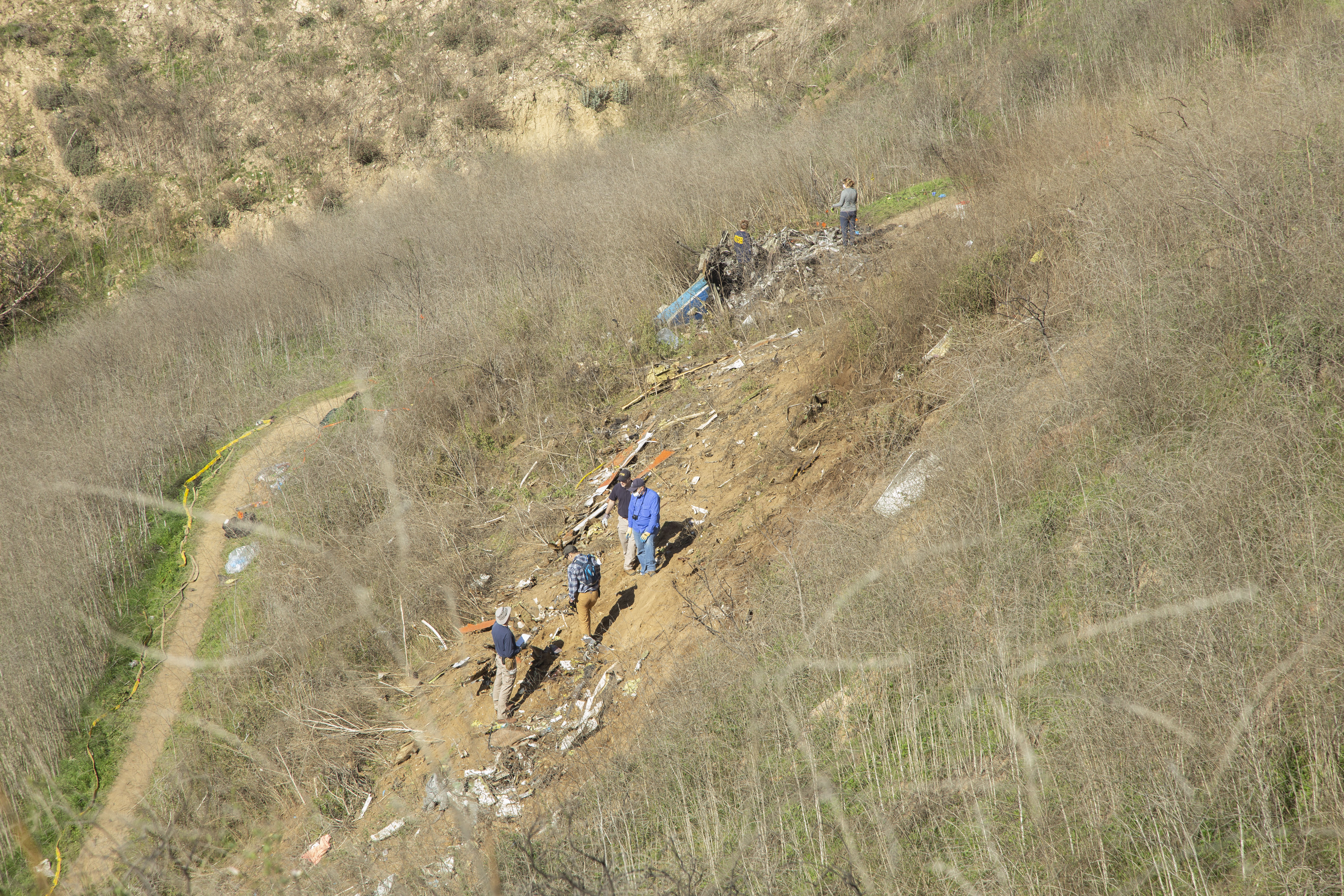
- NTSB investigators examining aircraft debris one day following the crash, January 27, 2020

Accident
- Date: January 26, 2020
- Summary: Flight into instrument meteorological conditions resulting in spatial disorientation and loss of control
- Site: Calabasas, California, U.S.; 34°08′13″N 118°41′32″W

Aircraft
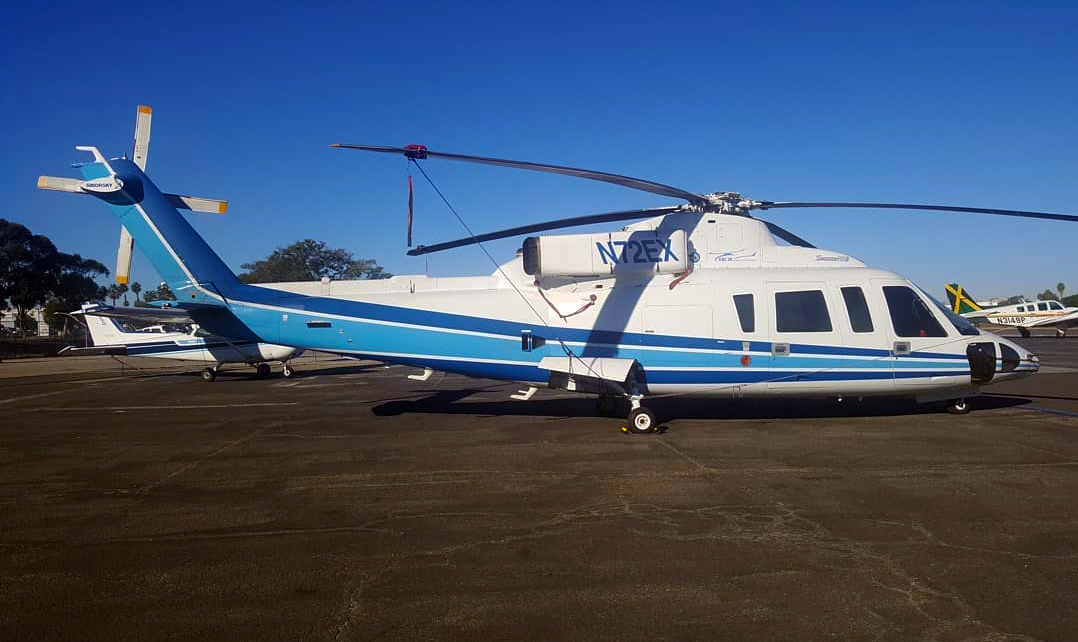
- N72EX, the helicopter involved in the accident, pictured in 2018
- Aircraft type: Sikorsky S-76B
- Operator: Island Express Holdings Inc.
- Registration: N72EX
- Flight origin: John Wayne Airport, Orange County, California
- Destination: Camarillo Airport, Camarillo, California
- Occupants: 9
- Passengers: 8
- Crew: 1
- Fatalities: 9
- Survivors: 0

On January 26, 2020, a Sikorsky S-76B helicopter crashed into a hillside in the city of Calabasas, California around 25 mi (40 km) northwest of downtown Los Angeles, while en route from John Wayne Airport to Camarillo Airport. There were no survivors: former professional basketball player Kobe Bryant and his 13-year-old daughter Gianna; baseball coach John Altobelli, his wife Keri and their 14-year-old daughter Alyssa; Sarah Chester and her 13-year-old daughter Payton; basketball coach Christina Mauser and the pilot Ara Zobayan.

The incident was investigated by the National Transportation Safety Board (NTSB), which concluded that it was caused by continued VFR into IMC: the helicopter entered low cloud cover, which caused the pilot to lose his sense of orientation and thus lose control of the helicopter.

== Accident ==
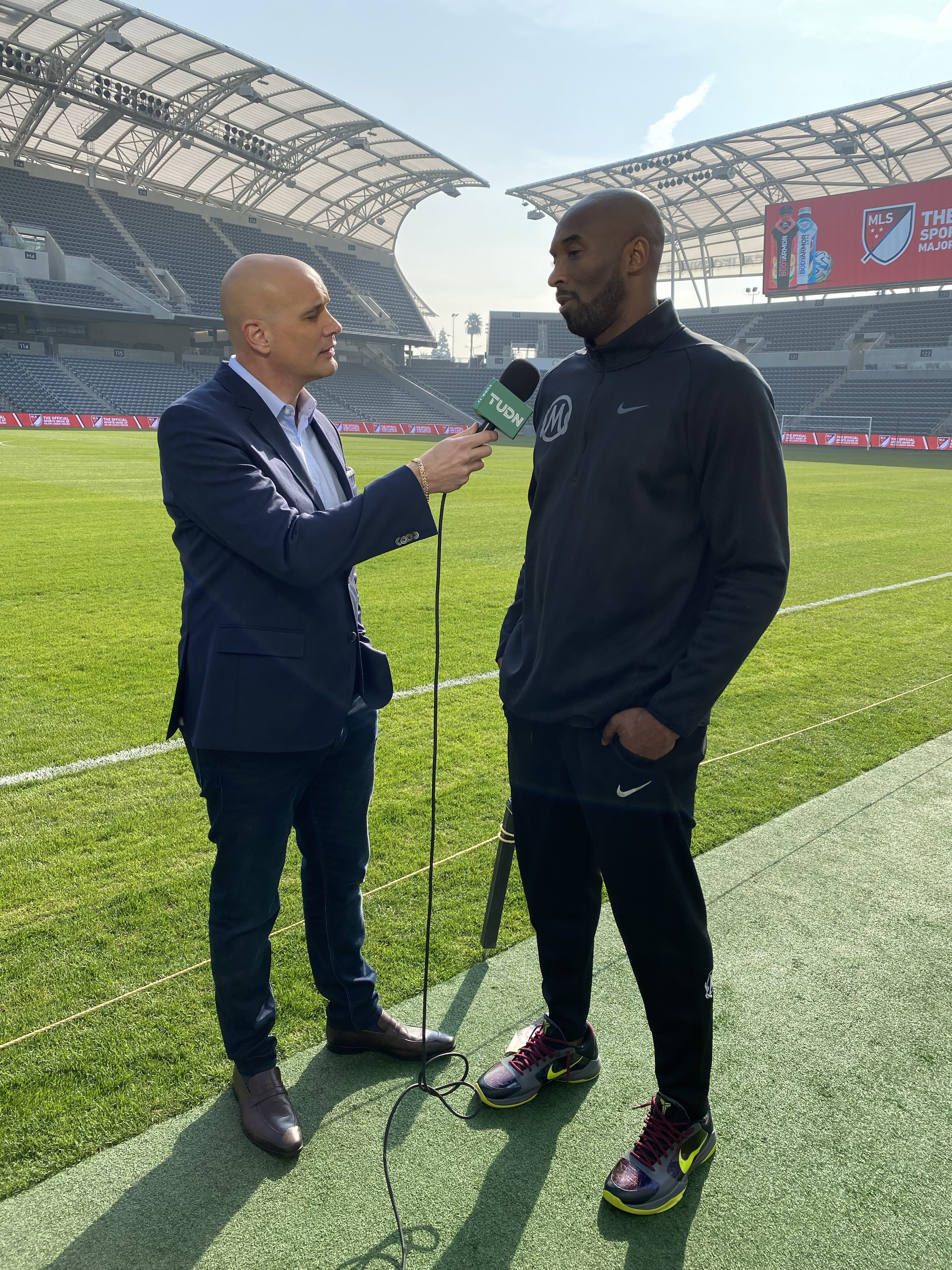
Kobe Bryant (right), former Los Angeles Lakers player, being interviewed by Iván Kasanzew 11 days before the crash

On Sunday, January 26, 2020 at about 9:06 a.m PST (17:06 UTC), eight passengers and one pilot departed from John Wayne Airport (SNA) in Orange County, California in a 1991 Sikorsky S-76B helicopter, registration N72EX. They were heading to a basketball game at Bryant's Mamba Sports Academy in Newbury Park, where he was scheduled to coach his daughter's team. Flight history records showed the helicopter had flown same journey the day before without incident to Camarillo Airport (CMA), a major general aviation airport about 20 minutes by car from Mamba Sports Academy. The previous day's flight had taken only 30 minutes, in contrast, driving from Bryant's home in Newport Beach to the academy would normally take at least 2 hours.

=== Weather conditions ===
Several video recordings of the crash site were available and although none showed the crash itself, the sound of the helicopter and the crash was recorded. In particular, surveillance cameras installed at the Agoura Pony Baseball Fields provided overlapping coverage of the final parts of the flight path. The NTSB conducted a visibility study which used frequency analysis to determine when the aircraft made the closest approach to each camera, ground-speed, engine RPM and likely inflight visibility by comparing video recorded during the accident period to clear-sky imagery. The report concluded that, at the moment of the accident, the estimated visibility ranges were between 1–1.5 miles (1.6–2.4 km).

The Los Angeles Police Air Support Division had grounded its police helicopters on the morning of January 26 due to poor visibility and low ceiling; Air Support Division rules require at least 2 miles (3.2 km) of visibility and an 800-foot (240 m) cloud ceiling. At the time that N72EX took off from SNA, visibility was 5 miles (8.0 km) with a ceiling of 1,300 feet (400 m). It was operated by Island Express Helicopters, Inc. as a 14 CFR 135 (Part 135) on-demand passenger flight under visual flight rules (VFR). Flying through clouds is possible if a pilot elects to operate under instrument flight rules (IFR) but the company's Part 135 operating certificate, issued in 1998, limited operations to on-demand VFR-only flights. Even if the company's operating certificate and its own internal policies had allowed for flying under IFR, that option could still have led to lengthy delays and detours (thereby using up any anticipated time savings) because of severe congestion in Los Angeles controlled airspace. Bryant's celebrity status would not have given the helicopter priority in that airspace.

According to an automated weather station, the ceiling (distance from ground to bottom of the cloud layer) at the Van Nuys Airport was 1,100 feet (340 m) above ground level. Closer to the site of the crash, the cloud top extended up to 2,400 feet (730 m) above mean sea level.

=== Flight ===
Key locations during flight on January 26, 2020
1 9:06 a.m.: John Wayne Airport (SNA), flight's origin
2 9:17 a.m.: Flight deviates from prior routes, continuing NW along I-5
3 9:20–9:32 a.m.: Flight holds over Glendale for air traffic at Burbank Airport
4 9:39 a.m.: Flight approved to turn SW shortly after reaching SR 118
5 9:42 a.m.: Flight arrives at and starts to follow Ventura Freeway west
6 9:44 a.m.: Southern California TRACON advises altitude is too low for flight following; pilot states intention to climb to avoid cloud layer (last transmission); flight climbs to 2,300 ft (700 m) and turns south, then starts sharply descending turn to SE
7 9:45 a.m.: Crash site
8 Camarillo Airport (CMA), intended destination

Audio of the radio transmissions between the helicopter and controllers until contact was lost

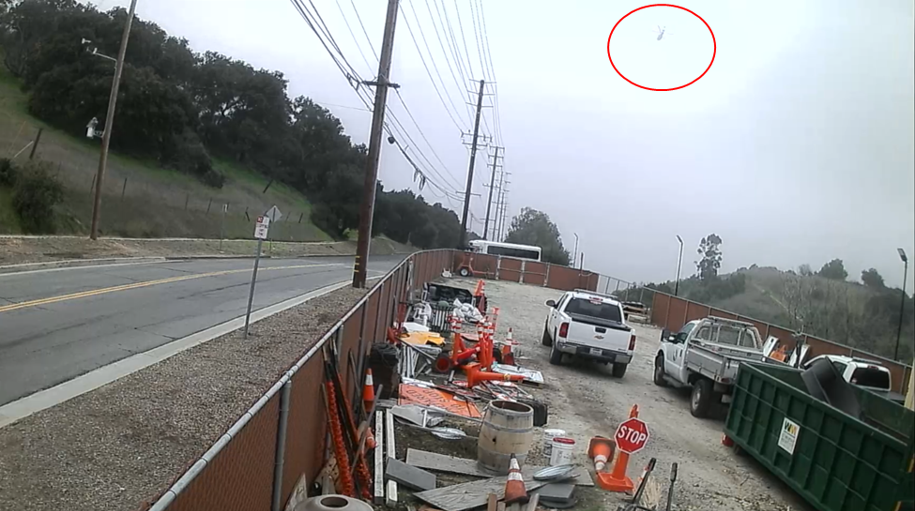
In this still frame from a security video, the helicopter can be seen in the upper right (circled in red) flying in the clouds, minutes before the crash happened.

Because visual flight rules prohibit a pilot from flying into or near clouds, the helicopter remained at an altitude of 700 or 800 feet (210 or 240 m) above mean sea level (MSL) while flying northwest from SNA. On most of its previous flights to Camarillo, the helicopter had turned west at downtown Los Angeles and flown over the Santa Monica Mountains until it picked up the Ventura Freeway (US 101). On January 26, that was not an option for VFR flights because of a deep marine layer which had pushed fog from the Pacific Ocean into the Santa Monica Mountains. Instead, the helicopter continued northwest, passed over Boyle Heights near Dodger Stadium and began following the route of the Golden State Freeway (I-5); as the flight approached Glendale, pilot Zobayan requested permission from the Hollywood Burbank Airport air traffic controllers to transition to following the Ventura Freeway (US 101). Burbank controllers advised him that weather conditions around the airport dictated IFR and held the helicopter circling in a holding pattern for 11 minutes starting at 9:21 a.m. PST (UTC−08:00) before granting it permission to proceed into the controlled airspace around Burbank Airport. The hold allowed two inbound flights to land; while holding, Burbank informed Zobayan the cloud top extended to an altitude of 2,400 ft (730 m). Burbank called Van Nuys, which was also operating under IFR, and Van Nuys advised Burbank to take Zobayan north of Van Nuys.

Permission to proceed was granted at 9:32 a.m. (17:32 UTC) under special VFR, requiring the pilot to stay under 2,500 feet (760 m) altitude. The helicopter climbed to an altitude of 1,400 feet (430 m) MSL, which Zobayan confirmed with Van Nuys at 9:35 a.m. (17:35 UTC). After proceeding through Burbank controlled airspace, the flight turned west, following the Ronald Reagan Freeway (SR 118) as it passed into the Van Nuys Airport controlled airspace; the Van Nuys controllers shortly afterward approved a turn southwest towards the Ventura Freeway (US 101) at 9:39 a.m. (17:39 UTC). Zobayan then confirmed he was still in VFR flight conditions at 1,500 feet (460 m) and acknowledged the handoff to Southern California air traffic control (SCT).

SCT made its first contact with Zobayan at 9:40 a.m. (17:40 UTC), confirming the helicopter's altitude and continued operation under VFR conditions. SCT informed Zobayan that at the aircraft's current altitude and position, they would lose communication and radar contact shortly, advising him to "squawk VFR" (transmit transponder code 1200) until he could contact Camarillo on the radio. By 9:42 a.m. (17:42 UTC), the helicopter had started following the Ventura Freeway west, entering more hilly terrain at the western edge of the San Fernando Valley. The SCT controller was relieved by a different controller at 9:43 a.m. (17:43 UTC). At 9:44:34 a.m. (17:44:34 UTC), Zobayan advised SCT that N72EX would be climbing above the cloud cover; the relieving SCT controller asked Zobayan to identify and asked if he was requesting flight following, a tracking service that would have provided the VFR flight with continuous verbal updates on air traffic. Zobayan confirmed that he was and in response to a question about his intentions, advised air traffic control at 9:45:15 a.m. (17:45:15 UTC) that he would level out at 4,000 feet (1,200 m); this was the last transmission made by Zobayan.

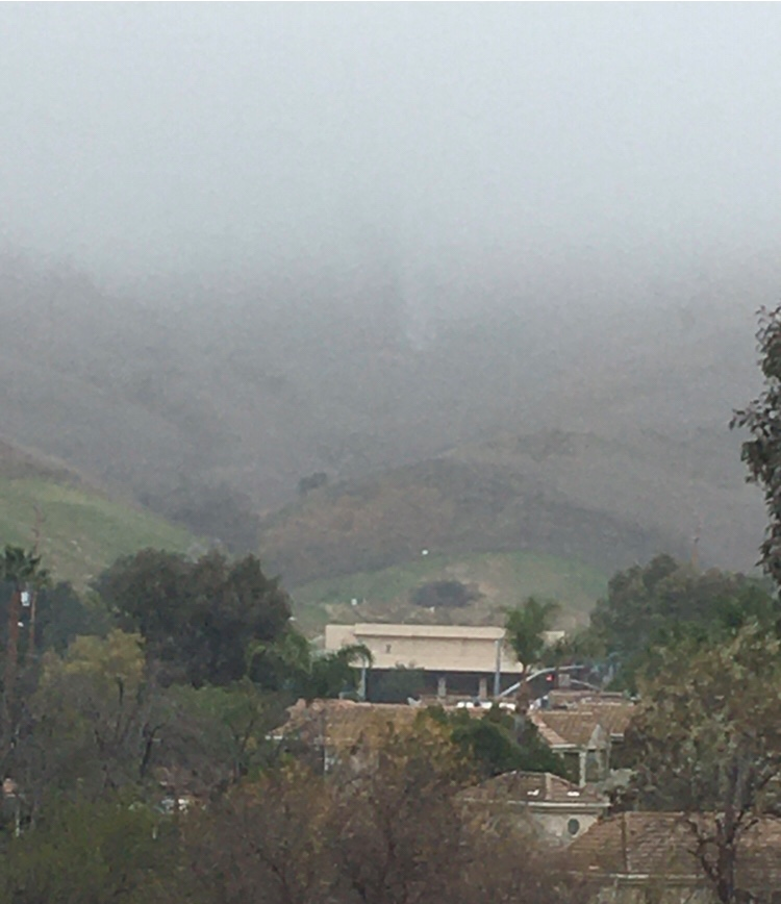
The helicopter proceeding westward along the highway before disappearing in the clouds

As it approached higher ground, the helicopter began to climb, gaining about 1,000 feet (300 m) of altitude in 36 seconds. According to transponder data, the helicopter first entered a climbing turn to the left, taking a southern heading and peaking at an altitude of 2,300 feet (700 m) MSL (1,500 feet (460 m) AGL). Eight seconds later, at about 9:45:18 a.m. (17:45 UTC), the helicopter, continuing its left turn to the southeast, started to descend rapidly. It reached a descent rate of more than 4,000 feet per minute (20 m/s) and a ground speed of 160 knots (180 mph; 300 km/h) before it struck a hillside at an elevation of approximately 1,085 feet (331 m); the aircraft's altitude at the last recorded ADS-B signal (9:45:36 a.m.) was 1,295 feet (395 m).

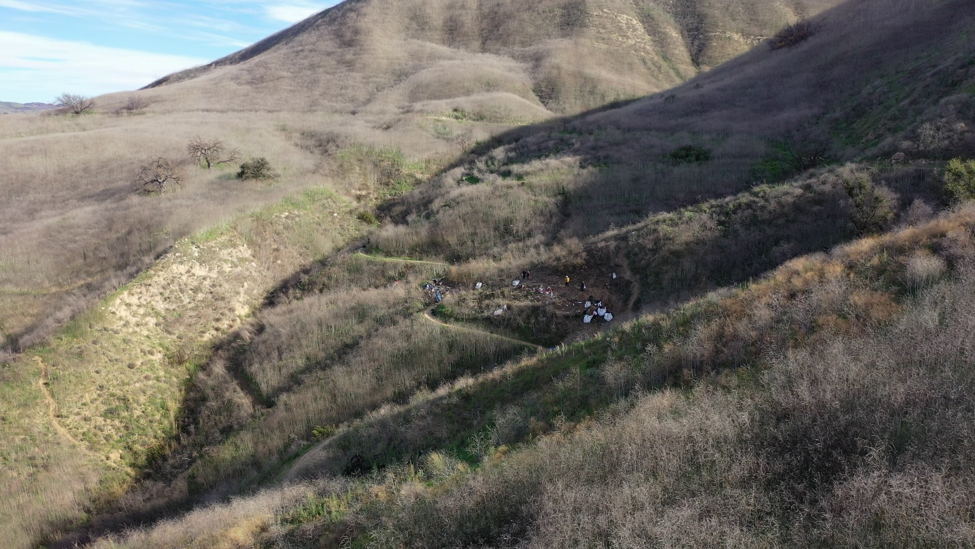
Still image from the drone video at the last recorded ADS-B signal; the drone was deployed by NTSB to duplicate the flight path of N72EX.

=== Impact and emergency response ===
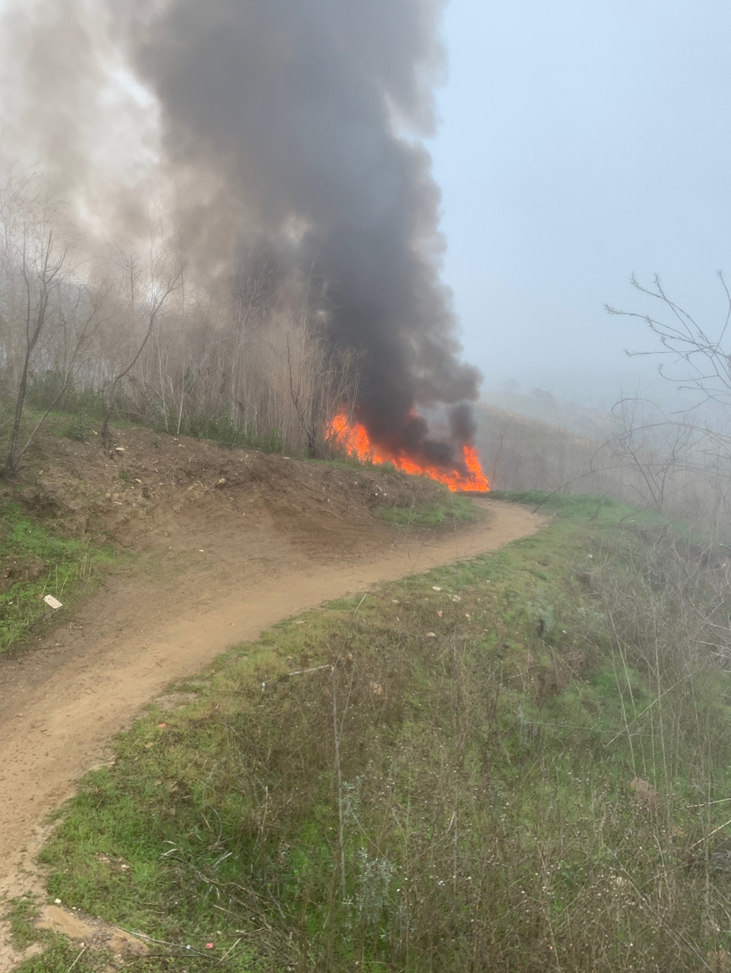
A witness captured this photo of the helicopter on fire shortly after the crash.

The helicopter crashed and caught fire in Calabasas, California near the intersection of Las Virgenes Road and Willow Glen Street as reported by a 9-1-1 emergency call at 9:47 a.m. (17:47 UTC). The crash occurred on the New Millennium Loop Trail on a hillside behind the headquarters of the Las Virgenes Municipal Water District. The hillside is public land managed by both the water district and another government agency known as the Mountains Recreation and Conservation Authority and forms part of a small valley that also happens to be the upper end of Malibu Canyon.

The impact crater was 15 by 24 feet (4.6 by 7.3 m) in diameter and 2 feet (0.6 m) deep, and the main wreckage came to rest about 127 feet (39 m) away from the point of initial impact at an angle of 347° (northwest) where it was consumed by fire. Much of the helicopter, cabin, cockpit and instrumentation were highly fragmented and destroyed by the impact and subsequent fire.

The helicopter came down between two groups of mountain bikers who called 9-1-1. Witnesses reported that the helicopter's engine was "sputtering" before the crash. Others reported seeing the helicopter flying into the ground at a "fairly significant rate of speed." It is unclear whether a distress call was made.

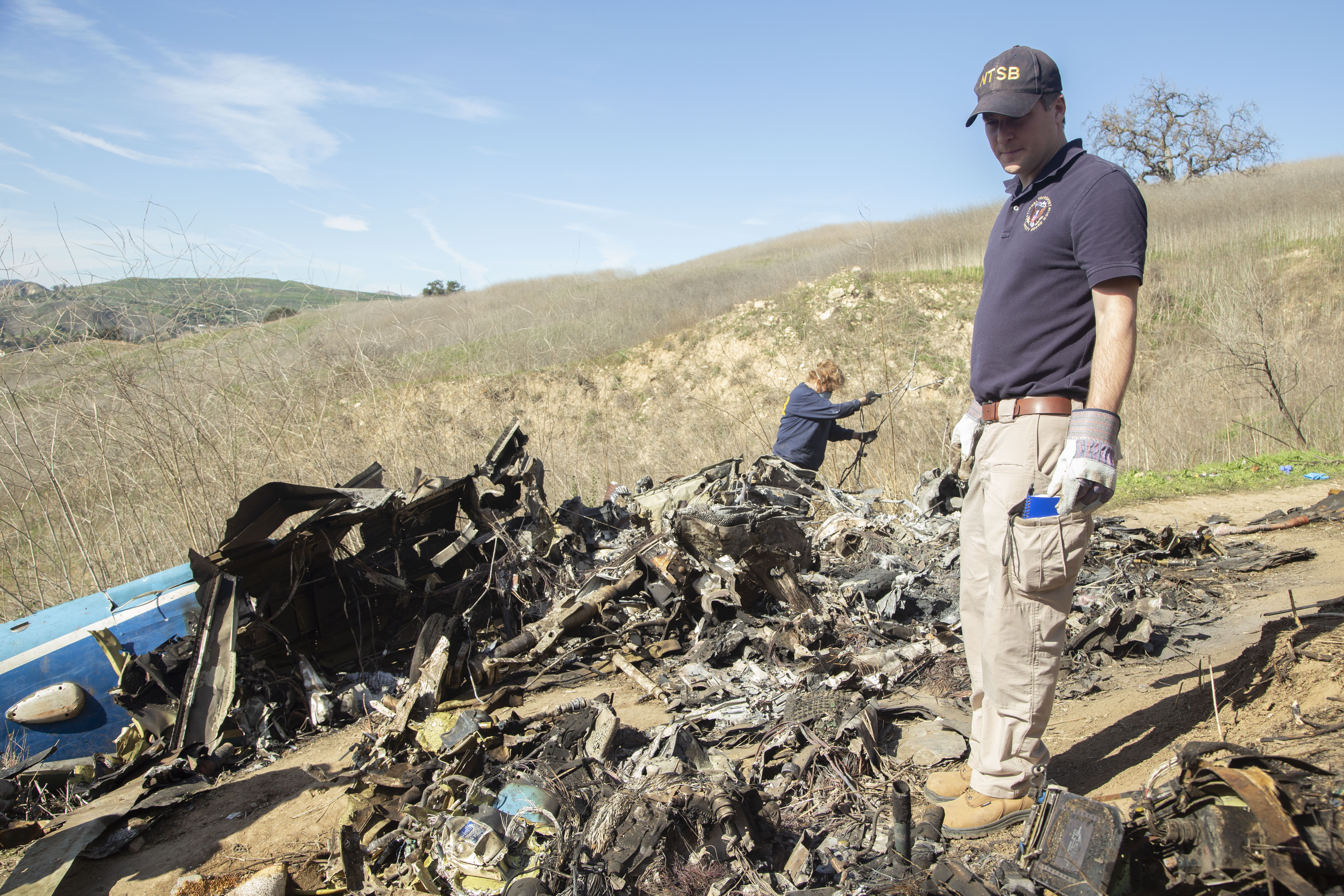
NTSB investigators, Adam Huray and Carol Hogan, examine the wreckage as part of the NTSB's investigation

The crash started a 1/4-acre (11,000 sq ft; 1,000 m^{2}) bush fire that was difficult to extinguish due to the presence of magnesium (which reacts with oxygen and water). Los Angeles County Fire Department firefighters responded to the scene and by 10:30 a.m. they extinguished the fire. The debris from the crash was scattered on steep terrain over a field estimated to extend 500 to 600 feet (150 to 180 m). Firefighters hiked to the site and paramedics rappelled from a helicopter to the scene but could not locate any survivors; all nine occupants of the helicopter were killed in the crash. Based on examinations by the Los Angeles County Department of Medical Examiner-Coroner, all nine occupants died from blunt trauma.

== Aircraft ==
Front view of the Sikorsky S-76B (model) released by the NTSB

The helicopter was a Sikorsky S-76B built in 1991, now registered N72EX. It was owned by Island Express Holding Corporation based in Fillmore, California. Until 2015, it had been owned by the government of the state of Illinois, which used it to transport governors and other officials. The state flew the helicopter as N761LL from 2007 to 2015, when it was put up for sale for $515,161. It was not clear who owned the helicopter before 2007. According to Sikorsky, this type of helicopter was "originally built for the rigorous demands of the offshore oil & gas transportation" and has had a relatively strong safety record since it first flew in 1977.

The passenger compartment was converted from a configuration seating twelve to eight after the sale to Island Express. The aircraft did not have a flight data recorder (FDR) or cockpit voice recorder (CVR); helicopters in the U.S. are not required to carry them. Although the S-76B originally had a CVR installed, records show that Island Express had removed the CVR shortly after acquiring the helicopter from the Illinois state government in March 2016. The helicopter was also not equipped with a terrain awareness and warning system (TAWS); although the NTSB recommended that all helicopters designed to carry six or more passenger seats be equipped with a TAWS after a 2004 S-76A crash, the FAA did not enforce the recommendation.

Bryant's company had chartered the helicopter from Island Express, via broker OC Helicopters (OCH). Bryant had started using Island Express in 2015 and Zobayan was his preferred pilot. Zobayan held a commercial pilot certificate with rotorcraft-helicopter and instrument ratings, had a total of 8,577 flight hours, about 75 were IFR.

== Reporting ==
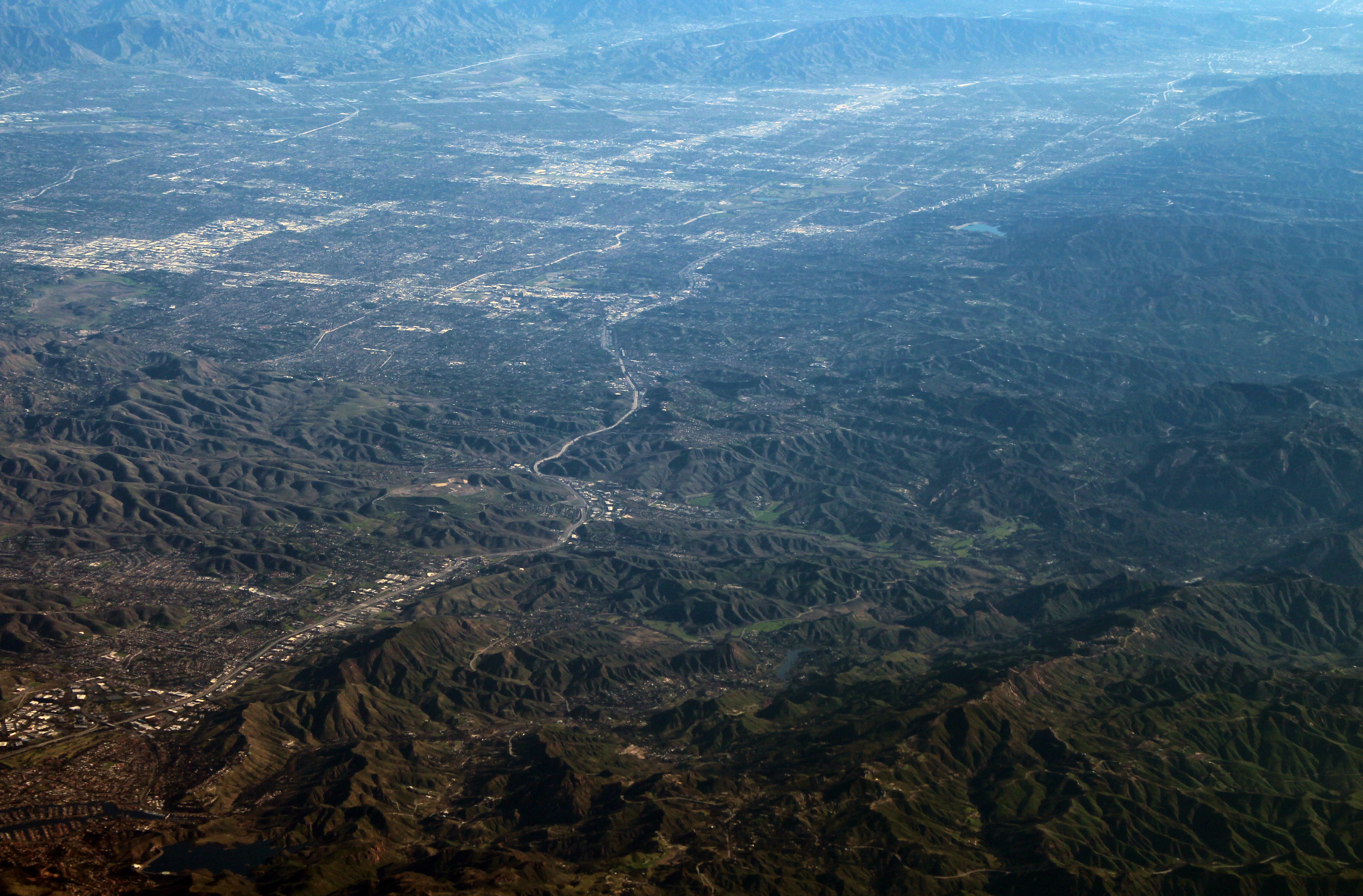
Aerial view of Calabasas, roughly centered on crash site. The helicopter entered from the upper right corner of this image, curved around Van Nuys Airport, then attempted to follow the Ventura Freeway (US 101) in order to exit to the lower left corner.

The operations manager of OC Helicopters called the vice president of Island Express around 9:49 a.m., asking for the current location of the helicopter since the flight tracking application Spidertracks had stopped tracking at 9:45 a.m. The vice president called the general manager of Island Express, who was unable to reach the pilot over VHF radio and Island Express activated their Emergency Response Plan at 9:58 a.m. The company launched another helicopter to the site of the last tracked position from the Queensway heliport (in Long Beach) at 10:22 a.m. but the later flight was recalled at 10:27 a.m. after a crash had been confirmed at the site.

At 11:24 a.m., less than two hours after the crash, TMZ was the first news source to confirm Bryant's death. TMZ was later criticized by local law enforcement for reporting the story before the coroner's office had the opportunity to confirm the identities of the helicopter's occupants and inform their families. Los Angeles County Sheriff Alex Villanueva stated, "It would be extremely disrespectful to understand that your loved one had perished and you learn [that] through TMZ."

The Los Angeles County sheriff speaking about the crash

At 2:30 p.m., the Los Angeles County Sheriff and Los Angeles County Fire Department held a joint press conference detailing initial aspects of the crash. Los Angeles County fire chief Daryl Osby confirmed the Federal Aviation Administration and the National Transportation Safety Board (NTSB) were on the scene investigating. A "Go Team" consisting of 18 people, including specialists and investigators from the NTSB, arrived in the evening.

Sheriff Villanueva urged people to stay away because people had flooded into residential neighborhoods around the crash site and the traffic was getting in the way of responders. The FAA imposed a five-mile (8 km) no-fly zone around the crash site up to an altitude of 5,000 feet (1,500 m) at the request of Bryant's wife, Vanessa, in order to protect the victims' privacy. The Medical Examiner-Coroner was able to initially remove the remains of three of the nine victims overnight. In response to attempts at unauthorized access during the first evening after the crash, Sheriff Villanueva assigned deputies to patrol the rugged terrain on horseback and all-terrain vehicles in order to enforce a secure perimeter and prevent access by souvenir hunters. It was later reported that Los Angeles County sheriff deputies had taken and shared unauthorized graphic photos of the crash scene and were ordered by Sheriff Villanueva to delete the photographs to avoid discipline. The deletion of these photos led the Sheriff Civilian Oversight Commission to question whether that amounted to a cover-up.

It was reported the following day that the pilot was told that he was at a "too low level for flight following", which he had apparently requested, by air traffic controllers moments before the helicopter crashed into the hillside. This means that the helicopter was too low to be tracked by air traffic control, but does not necessarily mean that it was too low to fly safely.

By January 28, all nine bodies had been recovered from the crash site by the Medical Examiner-Coroner. The bodies of Kobe Bryant and three others were identified through fingerprints on January 28, and the five other bodies were identified on January 30 after DNA testing and analysis. Autopsies were conducted on January 28. By February 1, the Medical Examiner-Coroner had released the bodies of most of the victims to their families, including the Bryants.

== Legal actions ==
=== Against Island Express ===
On February 24, 2020, Vanessa Bryant, Bryant's wife and Gianna's mother, filed a wrongful death lawsuit against Island Express, the helicopter company that was transporting the eight passengers, as well as the heirs of the estate of Zobayan, the pilot. Island Express reiterated that Bryant was aware of the risks and disavowed responsibility, calling the crash "an act of God." Berge Zobayan, Ara's brother, responded to the original lawsuit in May, saying that Bryant was aware of the risks and faulted the negligence of the passengers. In August 2020, Judge Virginia Keeny denied a motion filed by Zobayan's estate for a change of venue; the suit was filed in Los Angeles Superior Court and already had been assigned to a court in Van Nuys. Bryant amended her suit in September, naming OC Helicopters as an additional defendant, alleging the owner had checked and monitored weather conditions during the fatal flight.

The Mauser and Altobelli families filed suit against Island Express in April, and the Chester family followed suit in May. Island Express filed a cross-complaint lawsuit against two SCT air traffic controllers working for the FAA in August 2020, stating their "series of erroneous acts and/or omissions" caused the crash.

=== Against law enforcement ===
Four Los Angeles County Sheriff deputies who had responded to the crash took or shared pictures on personal devices; when Sheriff Villanueva learned about it, he ordered the deputies to delete the photographs. Although there was no official policy prohibiting photographs at an accident, Villanueva called it "inexcusable ... To have that on top of what they've already gone through is unconscionable" and apologized to the families while calling for a state law to prohibit unauthorized photographs. California passed AB2655 in September 2020, which states first responders who take unauthorized photographs of victim(s) of a crime or accident outside their job duties can be cited with a misdemeanor offense, punishable by a fine of up to US$1,000 per instance. Vanessa Bryant filed suit against the sheriff's office over the sharing of crash scene photographs. Mauser's family filed a similar lawsuit against the sheriff's office in December. United States District Court Judge John F. Walter ruled the names of the deputies suspended for misconduct could be released to the public in March 2021.

On January 5, 2022, U.S. District Judge John F. Walter denied the county's motion to dismiss and set a trial date. During the trial in August 2022, it was alleged a deputy sheriff referred to Bryant's dead body as a "pile of meat". The jury sided with the Bryant family in a unanimous verdict, finding the defendants liable for invasion of privacy and infliction of emotional distress; the jury awarded Vanessa Bryant $16 million in damages, and co-plaintiff Chris Chester (whose wife and daughter were killed in the crash) $15 million.

== NTSB investigation ==
NTSB investigators examining the wreckage

A spokesperson for the National Transportation Safety Board said on January 31 that Island Express Helicopters, which owned the helicopter that crashed, was not certified to fly in foggy conditions.

On January 30, the wreckage of the helicopter was transported from Los Angeles to Phoenix, Arizona, for further analysis by NTSB investigators. However, the secure perimeter remained in place around the crash site, pending removal of hazardous materials (especially jet fuel and hydraulic fluids) by a private hazmat cleanup crew under the supervision of the California Department of Toxic Substances Control.

On February 7, the NTSB released an "investigative update" regarding the crash. Preliminary findings from the NTSB update showed that there was no evidence of engine failure. The report indicated that "viewable sections of the engines showed no evidence of an uncontained or catastrophic internal failure" and that damage to the blades was "consistent with powered rotation at the time of impact."

On June 17, 2020, the NTSB released the public docket on the crash. It contained more than 1,700 pages "of factual reports on operations, survival factors, human performance, air traffic control, and aircraft performance. The docket also includes interview transcripts, photographs, and other investigative materials."

On February 9, 2021, the NTSB held a meeting to determine the probable cause of the crash. The Board concluded that Zobayan had flown into thick clouds, contrary to VFR requirements; the resulting spatial disorientation and loss of control led to the crash. Cited as likely contributing causes were self-induced pressure by the pilot to complete the flight and the inadequate oversight of Island Express over its safety management process. Flying at an excessive speed for the weather conditions was also mentioned in the final report. Even if the helicopter had been equipped with a terrain awareness and warning system, it was not likely to have helped to avoid the crash due to the pilot's disorientation. The "probable cause" reads:

The National Transportation Safety Board determines that the probable cause of this accident was the pilot's decision to continue flight under visual flight rules into instrument meteorological conditions, which resulted in the pilot's spatial disorientation and loss of control. Contributing to the accident was the pilot's likely self-induced pressure and the pilot's plan continuation bias, which adversely affected his decision-making, and Island Express Helicopters Inc.'s inadequate review and oversight of its safety management processes.

== Memorials ==
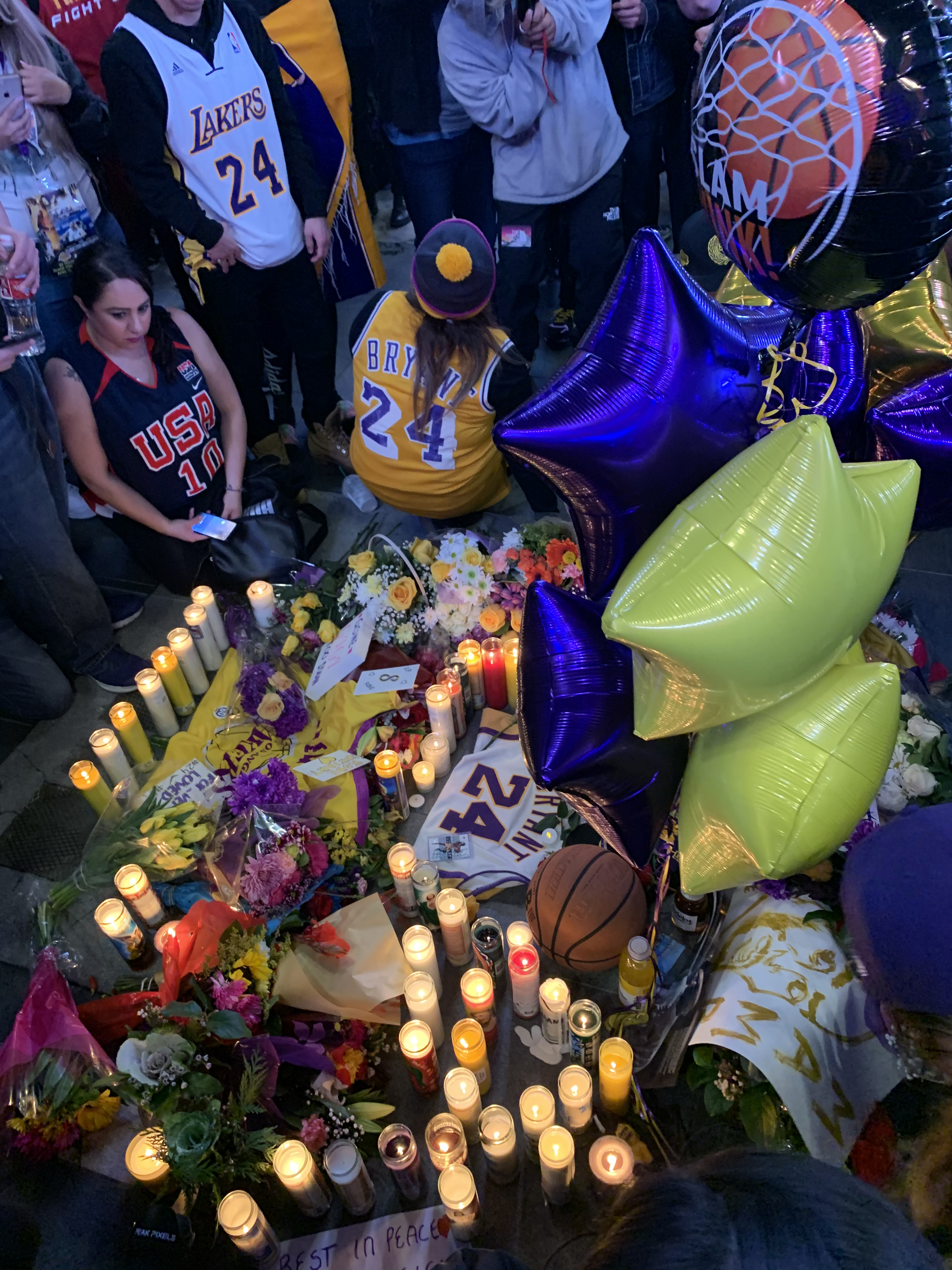
A makeshift memorial was set up outside Staples Center shortly after Bryant's death.

Around 200 people gathered at the foot of the hill close to the crash, with many wearing Bryant's jersey and holding basketballs. People also formed an impromptu memorial at the Staples Center, the home arena of the Los Angeles Lakers (the team which Bryant had played for during his entire 20-year NBA career, from 1996 to 2016) just hours before the arena was scheduled to host the 62nd Annual Grammy Awards. During the ceremony, host Alicia Keys and Boyz II Men performed "It's So Hard to Say Goodbye to Yesterday" in tribute to Bryant, and other performers, including Lil Nas X, Lizzo, Run-DMC, Aerosmith and DJ Khaled, incorporated tributes to Bryant in their performances. Bryant's two retired jerseys hanging in the rafters of Staples Center were illuminated by spotlight. A week after Bryant's death, Staples Center staff began to clean up the makeshift memorial outside the arena, but promised to catalog, pack, and ship all nonperishable items to his family. Among the items thus recovered were 1,350 basketballs, as well as "25,000 candles, 5,000 signs or letters, 500 stuffed animals, 350 pairs of shoes and 14 banners."

Fans created a memorial for Bryant outside of the Kobe Bryant Gymnasium at Lower Merion High School in Ardmore, Pennsylvania, which Bryant attended from 1992 to 1996. Jerseys, dedicated basketballs, teddy bears, flowers and candles were all laid down to memorialize Bryant.

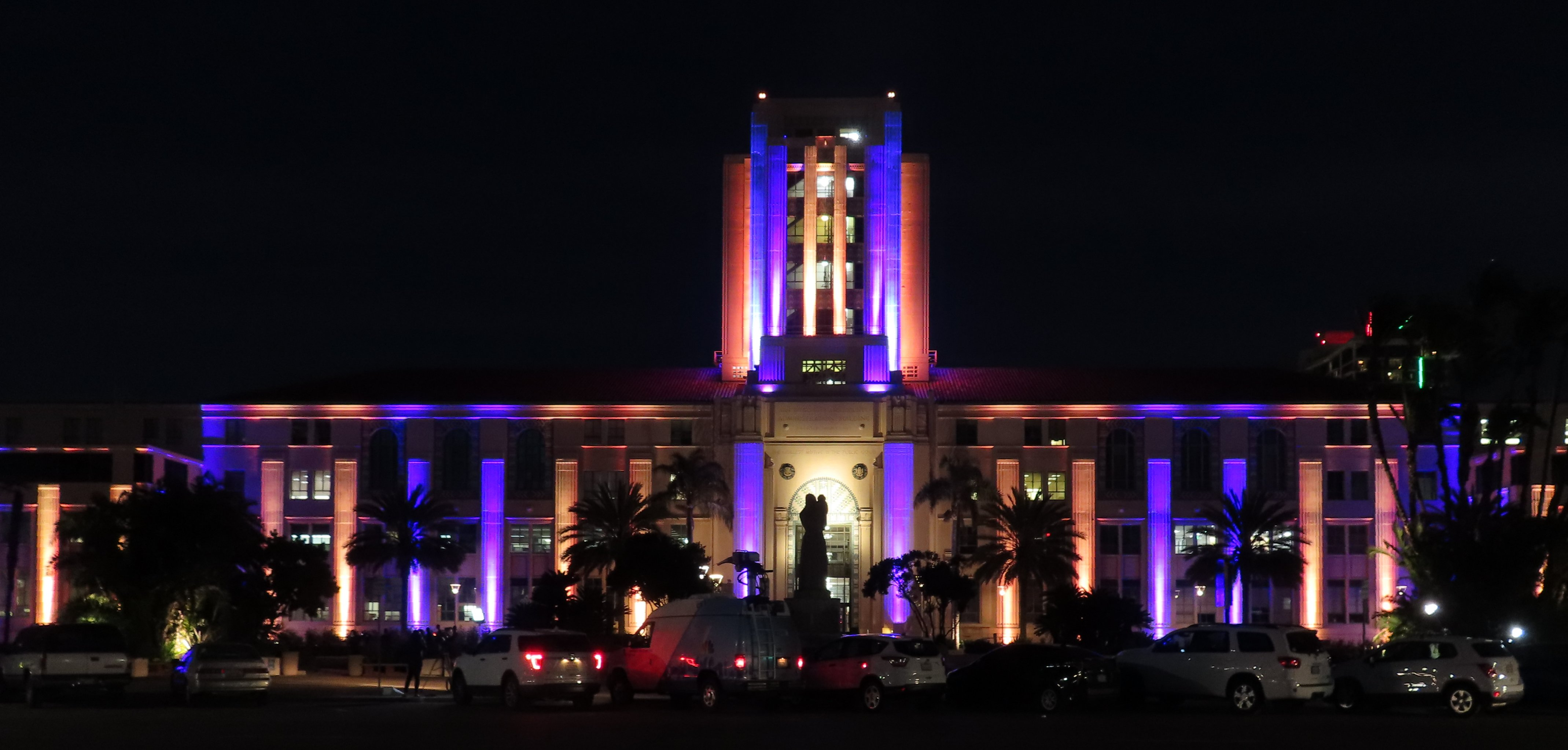
San Diego County Administration Center illuminated in Los Angeles Lakers colors on January 30 as a memorial to Bryant

Landmarks around the world, including the Los Angeles International Airport, Madison Square Garden, the Empire State Building and the Santa Ana Water Tower in Bryant's home of Orange County, CA were lit purple and gold in Bryant's memory.

On February 2, the world's tallest building, Burj Khalifa, lit up with images in tribute to Bryant and his daughter. The display was arranged by the Executive Chairman of Dubai Multi Commodities Centre (DMCC) Ahmed Sultan Bin Sulayem.

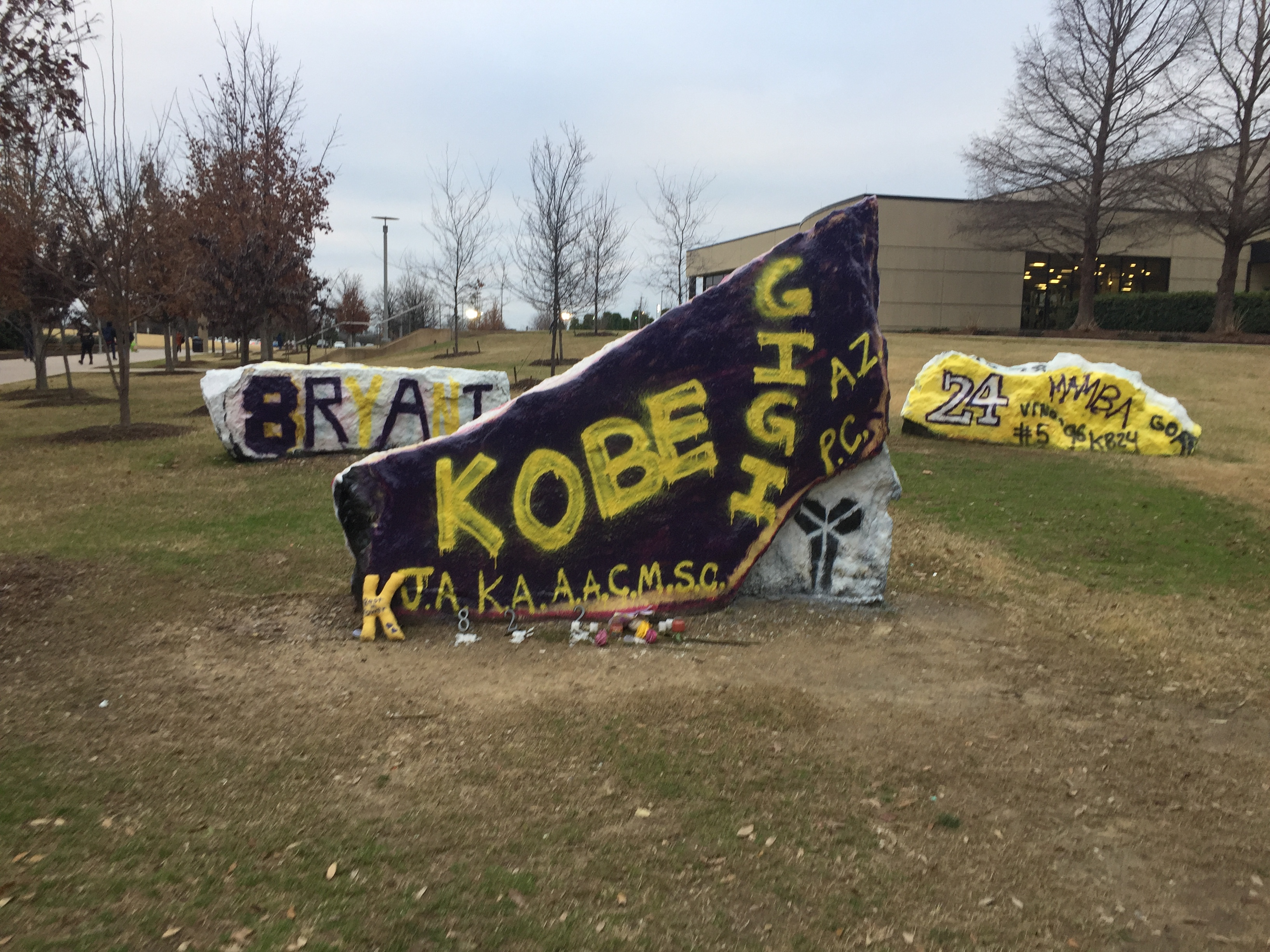
Memorial at the University of Texas at Dallas

On February 7, Bryant and his daughter were buried in a private funeral in Pacific View Memorial Park in the Corona del Mar neighborhood of Newport Beach. Two days later, Bryant was also featured, alongside other recently deceased figures from the film industry, in the In Memoriam montage at the 92nd Academy Awards on February 9. A memorial celebration of Bryant and his daughter hosted by Jimmy Kimmel was held at Staples Center on February 24, 2020.

On February 10, a memorial service was held inside Angel Stadium in Anaheim, California, honoring John Altobelli, his wife Keri and daughter Alyssa.

On July 18, the Academy of Television Arts & Sciences posthumously awarded Bryant a Governor's Award at the 72nd Los Angeles Emmy Awards in recognition of "his legacy of philanthropy, community building and inspiration that extended beyond the basketball court." Composer John Williams, whom Bryant worked with on his animated short film Dear Basketball, accepted the award on his behalf.

On January 26, 2022, on the second anniversary of the death of Bryant and his daughter, sculptor Dan Medina revealed a 150-pound (68 kg) bronze statue of the two at the crash site in Calabasas, where it was displayed for one day. Medina said he hoped to create a larger, life-sized version of the statue that could be displayed in downtown Los Angeles, which became the premise for the Statue of Kobe Bryant and Statue of Kobe and Gianna Bryant. On March 12, 2022, Orange Coast College renamed their baseball stadium to honor John Altobelli.

== Reactions ==
=== Basketball ===
Fans of Bryant mourning his death

NBA Commissioner Adam Silver said in a statement:

The NBA family is devastated by the tragic passing of Kobe Bryant and his daughter Gianna, ... For 20 seasons, Kobe showed us what is possible when remarkable talent blends with an absolute devotion to winning. He was one of the most extraordinary players in the history of our game with accomplishments that are legendary ... But he will be remembered most for inspiring people around the world to pick up a basketball and compete to the very best of their ability. He was generous with the wisdom he acquired and saw it as his mission to share it with future generations of players, taking special delight in passing down his love of the game to Gianna.

Gregg Downer, Bryant's high school basketball coach, was "completely shocked and devastated" by the news and was initially too distraught to speak to the media. Downer coached Bryant at Lower Merion High School in suburban Philadelphia from 1992 to 1996 and won the state championship with Bryant in 1996.

Michael Jordan, to whom Bryant was often compared, said in a statement: "Words can't describe the pain I am feeling. I loved Kobe – he was like a little brother to me... We used to talk often, and I will miss those conversations very much. He was a fierce competitor, one of the greats of the game and a creative force." Shaquille O'Neal, Bryant's Lakers teammate from 1996 to 2004 and with whom he shared a friendship and later a heavily publicized feud, said that he was "sick" and "had no words to express the pain." Several NBA teams paid tribute to Bryant during their games that night with intentional on-court violations referring to his uniform numbers: violations of the 24-second shot clock and the rule requiring teams to advance the ball past midcourt within eight seconds. Kareem Abdul-Jabbar posted a video on Twitter expressing his condolences. LeBron James, who had passed Bryant on the list of NBA career scoring leaders the previous night and had spoken to Bryant on the morning of the accident, posted a statement on Instagram, saying "I'm heartbroken and devastated ... I promise you I'll continue your legacy." Jerry West, Laker great and general manager who had orchestrated the deal to acquire Bryant for the Lakers, said that "I think the thing that resonates with me most... One person with one name – Kobe – you wouldn't have to mention his last name" and that it was the "saddest day of his life" to learn that the families in the helicopter crash had died.

Dallas Mavericks owner Mark Cuban said "that the number 24 will never again be worn by a Dallas Maverick." Several NBA players previously wearing Bryant's uniform numbers decided to change to new numbers in honor of Bryant.

"Kobe is a brother to me. From the time I was in high school watching him from afar, to getting in this league at 18 and watching him up close, all the battles that we had throughout my career, the one thing that we always shared was that determination to just want to win, to just want to be great. The fact that I'm here now means so much to me. I want to continue, along with my teammates, his legacy. Not only for this year, but for as long as we can play this game of basketball that we love, because that's what Kobe Bryant would want. So in the words of Kobe Bryant, 'Mamba out'. But in the words of us, 'not forgotten' Live on, brother."

— LeBron James' tribute to Bryant prior to the Lakers first game after his death against the Portland Trail Blazers, five days after the crash (January 31, 2020)

The NBA later postponed the Los Angeles Lakers' game against the Los Angeles Clippers that had been scheduled for January 28, two days after the accident. The game was made up on July 30, the second game of the NBA's return from their suspension caused by the COVID-19 pandemic in North America. It was originally planned to be made up on April 9, but was postponed again due to the suspension. The game ended in a 103–101 comeback victory for the Lakers. On January 30, the first game after the crash was played at Staples Center between the Clippers and Sacramento Kings; the Clippers honored Bryant before the game by having Paul George, a Los Angeles county native, narrate a video tribute. The Clippers, who played in the same arena as the Lakers at the time, but covered up their rivals' banners when they were the designated home team, uncovered Bryant's 8 and 24 retired jersey banners as part of the tribute. The following day, the Lakers played their first game after the crash against the Portland Trail Blazers. Ahead of the game, the franchise paid tribute to Bryant and all who lost their lives in the crash with a pre-game ceremony. Performers included Usher, who sang "Amazing Grace" and Boyz II Men, who sang the National Anthem. James delivered a speech to the crowd in Bryant's memory, and every player in the Lakers' starting lineup was announced with Bryant's name. At halftime, Wiz Khalifa and Charlie Puth reunited to perform their hit "See You Again".

The Lakers went on to wear a patch with Bryant's initials for the rest of the season and added the initials to the back ends of their home court surface. Bryant's jersey numbers were added to the court sidelines, with his #8 near the Lakers bench, and his #24 near the visiting team's bench. The game was the second-most watched game in ESPN history, averaging 4.41 million viewers.

On February 15, commissioner Adam Silver announced that the NBA All-Star Game MVP Award would be renamed to the NBA All-Star Game Kobe Bryant Most Valuable Player in honor of Bryant. Also, in the 2020 NBA All-Star Game on February 16, each player on Team Giannis wore the jersey number 24, in honor of Kobe, while each player on Team LeBron wore the jersey number 2, in honor of Gianna.

Soon after the crash, the Basketball Hall of Fame in Springfield put Bryant's name on the sign in front of their headquarters as fans left candles and flowers on the large statue of James Naismith in front of the entrance. A vigil and a moment of silence was held inside the shrine with many fans of Bryant and the Lakers in attendance, despite it being in a strongly Celtics fans region. In addition to the Hall of Fame turning the thousands of lights of the large sphere of the shrine itself purple and gold numerous other office buildings in downtown Springfield did as well. Several billboards on Interstate 90 in Massachusetts were also dedicated to the memory of Bryant. The Hall of Fame went on to posthumously induct Bryant as a member of its Class of 2020.

In May 2020, almost four months after the crash, Mamba Sports Academy reverted its name to Sports Academy by dropping the "Mamba" nickname out of respect for Bryant. After the Lakers won the 2020 NBA Finals, they dedicated the championship to Bryant.

=== Other sports ===
Many Major League Baseball, National Football League, and National Hockey League players, teams and other organizations memorialized Bryant in the immediate aftermath of the crash.

News of Bryant's death broke just before kickoff of the 2020 Pro Bowl, with the players finding out in their locker rooms. Shortly after kickoff, Bryant's death was announced in the stadium and a moment of silence was held. ABC and ESPN broke away from their coverage of the event to cover the crash, and the player interviews focused heavily on the players' connections to, and respect for, Bryant. During pregame ceremonies for Super Bowl LIV the following week, players and coaches for both teams stood at both 24 yard lines, Bryant's number, during a tribute to Bryant and the other victims. With coverage of Bryant's death becoming a part of the Pro Bowl coverage, it was decided to end the Disney XD simulcast with nine minutes remaining in the second quarter and switch to a marathon of Big City Greens.

WWE paid tribute to Bryant during its 2020 Royal Rumble pay-per-view later that night, as did All Elite Wrestling during that week's AEW Dynamite in Cleveland with the Southern California-based stable SoCal Uncensored wearing Bryant jerseys to the ring, and many professional wrestlers expressed their condolences for the Bryant family.

Many ATP Tour tennis players paid tribute to Bryant during the 2020 Australian Open, including Novak Djokovic, who noted: "He was one of the greatest athletes of all time – he inspired myself and many other people around the world."

AC Milan, Bryant's favorite soccer team growing up in Italy, wore black armbands in memory of him in their Coppa Italia match against Torino on January 28, 2020. A minute of silence was also held before the match. Many soccer players and teams paid tribute to Bryant during matches and on social media. On January 26, 2020, after scoring his second goal from penalty spot against Lille OSC, Neymar paid tribute to Bryant by striking out four fingers of his right and two fingers of his left hand to mark number 24 towards the camera and then by offering a prayer to the heavens. On February 27, 2020, before Los Angeles FC's home match against Club León in the CONCACAF Champions League, LAFC fans unveiled a tifo honoring the Bryants; team captain Carlos Vela also wore an armband with Bryant's initials and uniform numbers. On January 27, Super League Greece club AEL retired number 24 from their roster indefinitely.

The NASCAR Cup Series' 2020 Auto Club 400 at Auto Club Speedway, located in nearby Fontana, California, featured various tributes from drivers and teams. Ryan Blaney and William Byron drove cars with special paint schemes honoring Bryant, with the former's being sponsored by Bodyarmor SuperDrink, a company of which Bryant was an investor. Sales of toy replicas of the cars were donated to philanthropic organizations connected to Bryant, with Byron's going to After-School All-Stars and Blaney's to MambaOnThree.org. Tyler Reddick's No. 8 car featured a tribute sticker, while Daniel Suárez raced with purple-and-gold gloves and shoes that were auctioned to support the Mamba On Three Fund. The track also painted a number 24 decal in the infield, while NASCAR conducted a pre-race ceremony to honor the victims.

Tiger Woods was informed of the tragedy by his caddie Joe LaCava after finishing his final hole at the Farmers Insurance Open, and stated in the post-round interview that Bryant "brought it each and every night on both ends of the floor. And not too many guys can say that throughout NBA history".

The following week's PGA Tour event was the Waste Management Open, an event that annually sees some of golf's most raucous crowds, particularly on the 16th hole. Several players, including Justin Thomas and Tony Finau, wore Bryant jerseys while playing the hole. On Sunday, the pin was placed 24 paces from the front and 8 paces from the left side in honor of Bryant's jersey numbers.

Formula One champion Lewis Hamilton posted on Instagram and Twitter paying tribute to Bryant, along with several other former and current drivers, while Renault F1 driver Daniel Ricciardo wore a purple racing helmet with "KB24" below the visor during the 2020 Formula One pre-season test. Chinese debutant Zhou Guanyu chose one of Bryant's jersey numbers, 24, as his race number to honour him.

=== In popular culture ===
American rappers Jay Electronica and Jay-Z recorded the somber track "A.P.I.D.T.A." on the night of the helicopter crash, later released as the final track on Jay Electronica's debut album A Written Testimony on March 13, 2020. ESPN's Elle Duncan shared an emotional story while she hosted the SportsCenter show on January 27, 2020, about how proud Bryant was of being a father to his daughters; Duncan recalled, amongst other things, Bryant telling her: "I would have five more girls if I could. I'm a girl dad." Duncan's story went viral and inspired other fathers across the world to celebrate their relationships with their daughters, using the hashtag #GirlDad.

American comedian, actor and writer Ari Shaffir caused outrage with his video response on Twitter to Bryant's death. In it, Shaffir celebrated Bryant's death and claimed that Bryant was a rapist. In the video, Shaffir said "Kobe Bryant died 23 years too late today, he got away with rape because all the Hollywood liberals who attack comedy enjoy rooting for the Lakers more than they dislike rape. Big ups to the hero who forgot to gas up his chopper. I hate the Lakers. What a great day." A New York comedy club where Shaffir was scheduled to perform canceled his performance after it received phone threats over Shaffir's video.

Kanye West dedicated the song "24" from his album Donda to Bryant.

The accident was featured on season 22 of the Canadian documentary series Mayday, in the episode titled "Loss of a Legend".

== See also ==
- List of accidents and incidents involving helicopters
- List of fatalities from aviation accidents
- American Airlines Flight 965, a 1995 crash of a Boeing 757 in a similar way in Colombia
- Cebu Pacific Flight 387, a 1998 crash of a DC-9 in similar way in the Philippines
- Air Philippines Flight 541, a 2000 crash of a Boeing 737 in similar way also in the Philippines
- Air China Flight 129, a 2002 crash of a Boeing 767 in similar way in South Korea
- Crossair Flight 3597, a 2001 crash of an Avro RJ100 in similar way near Zurich, Switzerland, which also killed other famous persons including singers Melanie Thornton as well as Nathaly van het Ende and Maria Serrano Serrano of the German Eurodance trio Passion Fruit
- Flydubai Flight 981, a 2016 crash of a Boeing 737 in similar way in Russia
- Piedade de Caratinga Beechcraft King Air crash, a 2021 Beechcraft King Air crash in similar circumstances in Brazil, which also involved the death of a famous person, singer Marília Mendonça.
- 2026 Rio de Janeiro mid-air collision, another accident involving a helicopter that killed singer-songwriter Oliver Tree.
- Kobe Bryant Day
