= Japan Air Lines Flight 2 =

1968 aviation accident in California

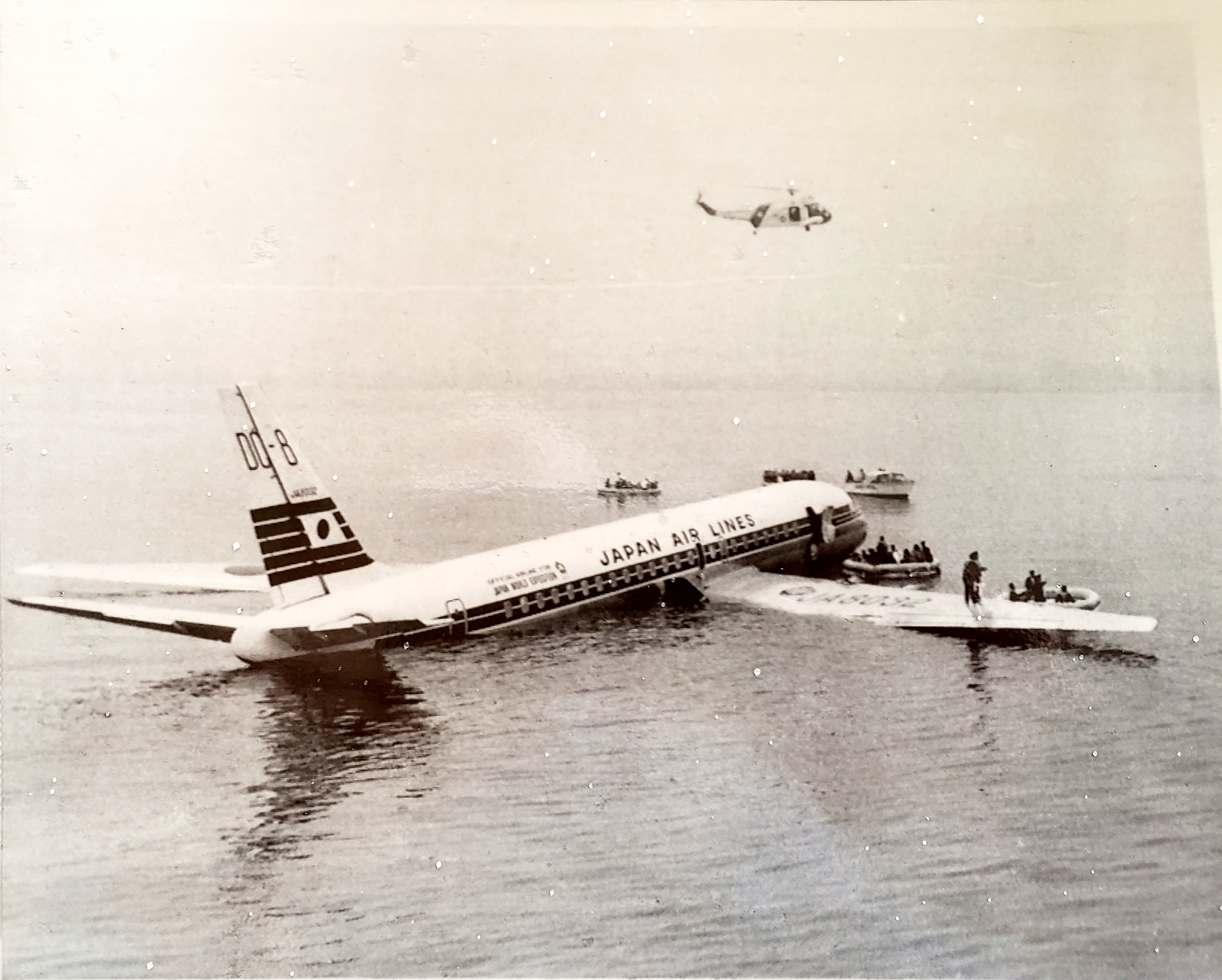
- Overview of the aircraft

Accident
- Date: November 22, 1968
- Summary: Controlled flight into terrain on approach due to pilot error
- Site: San Francisco Bay near Burlingame, California, United States; 37°35′25″N 122°18′19″W

Aircraft
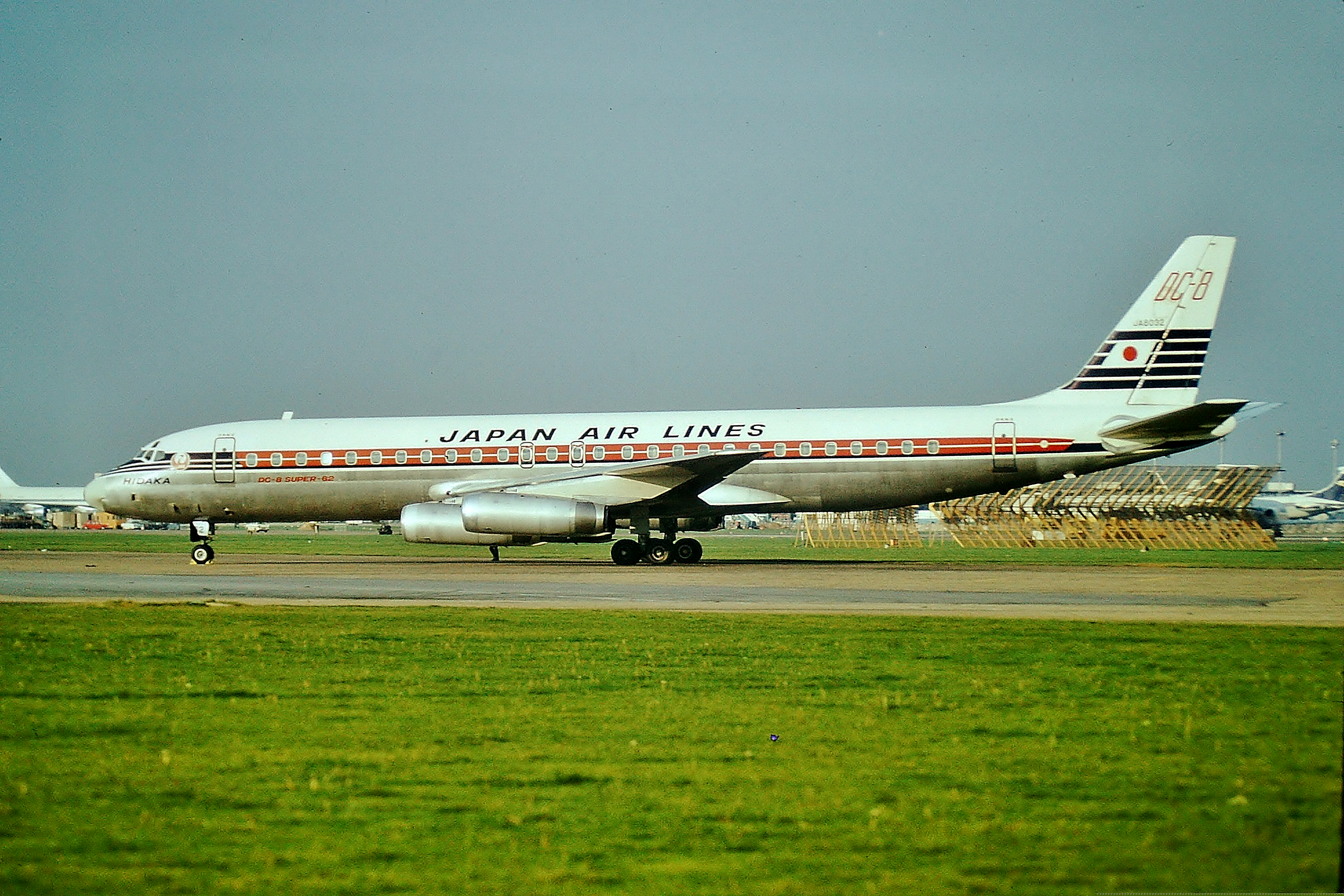
- JA8032, the aircraft involved in the accident, seen in 1970 with a newer livery
- Aircraft type: Douglas DC-8-62
- Aircraft name: Shiga
- Operator: Japan Air Lines
- IATA flight No.: JL2
- ICAO flight No.: JAL2
- Call sign: JAPAN AIR 2
- Registration: JA8032
- Flight origin: Haneda Airport, Tokyo, Japan
- Destination: San Francisco International Airport, near Millbrae, California, United States
- Occupants: 107
- Passengers: 96
- Crew: 11
- Fatalities: 0
- Survivors: 107

Japan Air Lines Flight 2 was a scheduled passenger flight on November 22, 1968. The plane was a six-month-old Douglas DC-8-62 named Shiga (志賀), flying from Tokyo International Airport (Haneda) to San Francisco International Airport (SFO). Due to heavy fog and other factors, Captain Kohei Asoh crashed the plane near Coyote Point in the shallow waters of San Francisco Bay, two and a half miles short of the runway. All 107 people on board survived the accident without any injuries. Despite the abrupt ditching, and being immersed in salt-water, the aircraft was recovered, repaired, and returned to service.

== Aircraft and crew ==
The aircraft registration number was JA8032 and the MSN was 45954/362. The engine model was the Pratt & Whitney JT3D-3B. The aircraft name was Shiga. The aircraft was manufactured on May 18, 1968, and delivered on May 27, 1968. The aircraft as well as the engines had a total operating time of 1707:54 hours.

Command of the flight fell to Captain Kohei Asoh (46), accompanied in the cockpit by First Officer Joseph Hazen (34), Flight Engineer Richard Fahning (40), and Navigator Ichiryo Suzuki (27).

== Accident ==
Flight 2 was scheduled to depart Tokyo at 5 p.m. (08:00 UTC) on Friday, November 22 and land in San Francisco at 10:15 a.m. (17:15 UTC). Actual departure was delayed to 5:36 p.m. (08:36 UTC) due to required maintenance on the pilot's instrument panel, which was providing inconsistent altitude readings. The flight was conducted without incident over the next eight hours.

As it approached its destination, JAL002 was picked up by local radar in Oakland at 8:54 a.m. (16:54 UTC) when 169 nmi (313 km; 194 mi) on the 257th radial from the Oakland Vortac and the aircraft was cleared for landing at SFO via a waypoint 21 mi (34 km) west of the Woodside Vortac station at an altitude of 8,000 ft (2,400 m). Oakland TRACON advised the pilots that local visibility at SFO was 3/4 mi (1.2 km) and the runway visual range exceeded 6,000 ft (1,800 m), recommending the flight to hold. Commanding pilot Captain Kohei Asoh attempted an automatic-coupled Instrument Landing System (ILS) approach due to the heavy fog, which he had never done before on a recorded DC-8-62 flight. JAL002 had started descending from its cruising altitude of 37,000 ft (11,000 m) at 8:59 a.m. (16:59 UTC), passing through 13,000 ft (4,000 m) approximately eleven minutes later, when Oakland TRACON provided an update on runway visual range at SFO, which had fallen to 3,500 ft (1,100 m). JAL002 continued its descent as air traffic control was handed over to Bay TRACON while close to the Woodside Vortac; the pilot reported an altitude of 8,000 ft (2,400 m) at 9:12:54.3 a.m. (17:12:54.3 UTC), then 6,500 ft (2,000 m) at 9:14:11.3 a.m. (17:14:11.3 UTC).

Key locations for JAL002 / JA8032, November 22, 1968

Less than a minute later, Captain Asoh requested that "due to the weather at San Francisco, we'd like a long final [approach], rather than direct to the outer marker", which would put the aircraft 6 mi (9.7 km) to the east of the original landing path marker and provide a straighter approach to the runway. Under the ILS approach, the autopilot and flight director would be used to control the aircraft's heading and altitude. At 9:16 a.m. (17:16 UTC), Bay TRACON instructed Asoh to descend to and maintain 4,000 ft (1,200 m) altitude and turn left to a heading of 040° while holding at an airspeed of 180 kn (330 km/h; 210 mph). Updates were made to the flight's heading and altitude in response to air traffic control, and the final approach was commanded at 9:20:44 a.m. when Bay TRACON instructed JAL002 to make a left turn and assume a heading of 280° as they passed through the localizer in accordance with the ILS approach. Once the localizer was captured, Asoh moved the autopilot selector from VOR LOC to ILS and slowed the plane to 160 kn (300 km/h; 180 mph) in accordance with instructions from the ground; he used the radio direction indicator as the primary instrument for the approach rather than the glide slope deviation indicator, which was fluctuating at the time. In addition, because his pressure altimeter had been replaced prior to the start of the flight, Asoh did not trust its readings, especially since it continued to disagree with the copilot's instrument, indicating a brief climb each time the aircraft had leveled off during the flight.

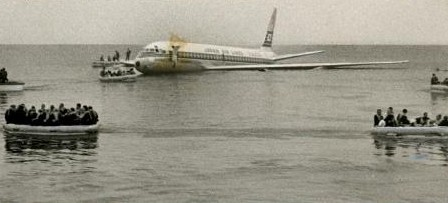
Another view of the aircraft in the water

The cloud ceiling was 300 ft (91 m) and there was little contrast between the sky and the calm waters of the bay. As a result, during the final descent, the too-low altitude was not recognized in time to correct it before hitting the water. Asoh had set his minimum descent altitude alert to 211 ft (64 m); the alert was triggered by the radio altimeter, as the pressure altimeter was reading 300 ft (91 m) at the time; as Asoh checked for runway lights, First Officer Hazen called out visual updates: "[we are] breaking out of the overcast — I cannot see the runway light — we are too low — pull up, pull up". Asoh later stated that he realized the plane was too low once he spotted the water after the plane broke through the fog with an air speed of 177 mi/h (285 km/h). He grabbed the control stick to gain altitude and advanced the throttles in anticipation of having to abort the landing and perform a go-around, but the plane's main landing gear had already struck the water, first right then left, approximately 2 1/2 mi (4.0 km) short of runway 28L. The plane touched down in the water at approximately 9:24:25 a.m. (1724:25 UTC). Passenger Walter Dunbar recalled "We came in alongside the mountains and went into thick fog. The next thing I knew, we were about one foot off the water. She hit, skipped twice, then nosed up."

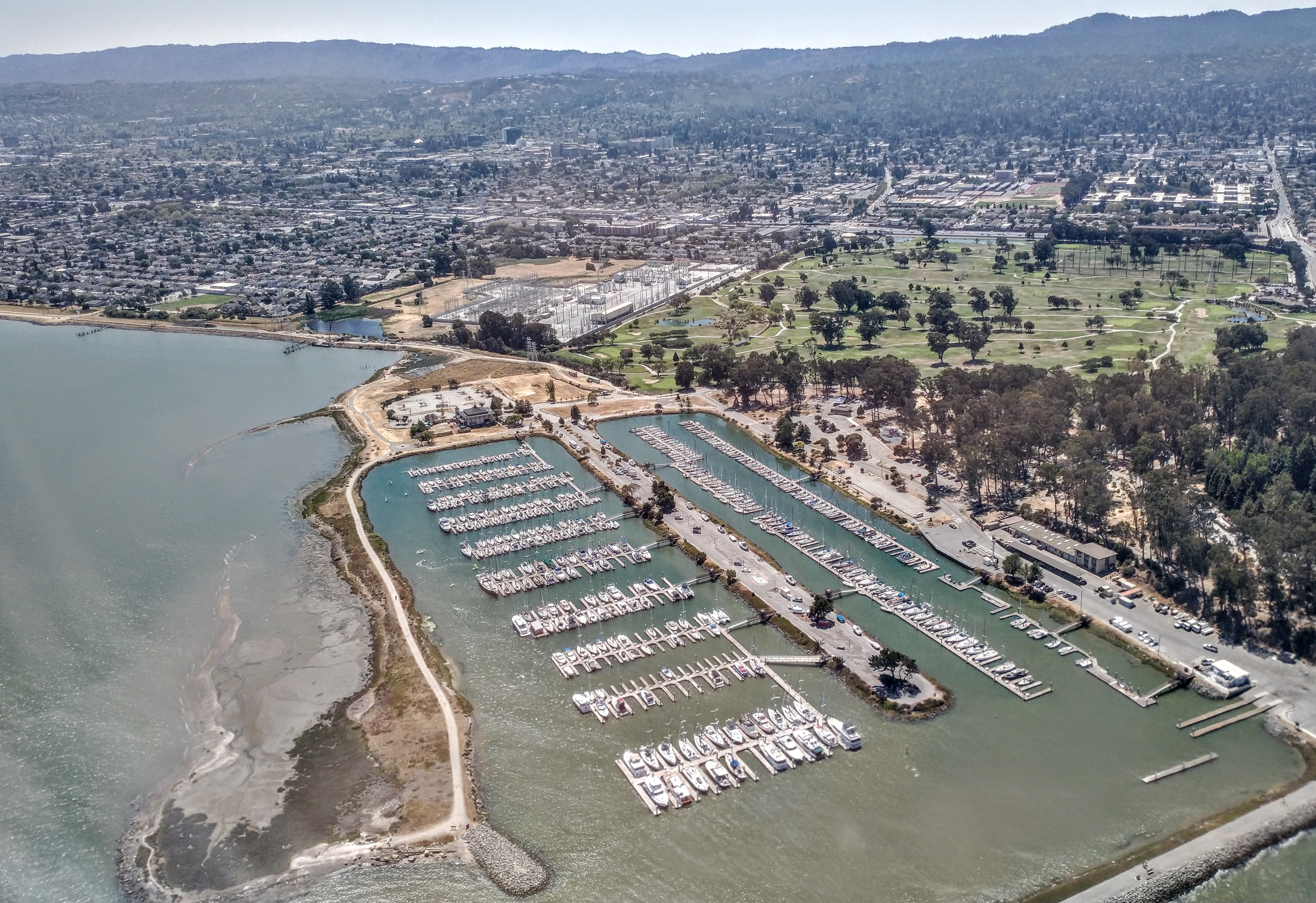
Coyote Point Marina / Yacht Harbor (2021), where passengers disembarked from rafts

An early report from the Coast Guard stated the aircraft came to rest upside down. In fact, the plane came to rest on the Bay floor in shallow water approximately 7 feet (2.1 m) deep, leaving the forward exits above the waterline. The chief purser, Kazuo Hashimoto, felt there was no panic amongst passengers after landing, and tried to make an announcement with the public address (PA) system. Since the PA system had failed after the landing, he ended up shouting from the forward cabin for passengers to "Be quiet, the plane has reached the bottom of the sea. It will not sink. Do not worry, we are well-fixed for evacuation." The passengers and crew all evacuated the plane on lifeboats, which were towed by police and Coast Guard boats to the nearby Coyote Point Yacht Harbor. Asoh was the last to leave. Asoh returned to the plane after ensuring everyone was safely ashore to gather and return the passengers' personal belongings.

After the incident, the US National Transportation Safety Board (NTSB) stated it was the first successful ditching of a jetliner since the inauguration of jet service. (Note: However, an earlier successful ditching of a jetliner occurred on 21 August 1963, when Aeroflot Flight 366, a Tupolev Tu-124, ran out of fuel and ditched in the Neva River, Soviet Union, with no injuries to the 52 people on board.) The landing may have been assisted by the unusually high tide of 7 feet (2.1 m), compared with the typical water level of 4 feet (1.2 m), leading South San Francisco fire chief John Marchi to declare the ditching "a one-in-a-million shot" as the increased depth gave sufficient cushioning while being shallow enough that exit doors would remain above the water.

== Investigation ==
"The probable cause of this accident was the improper application of the prescribed procedures to execute an automatic-coupled ILS approach. This deviation from the prescribed procedures was, in part, due to a lack of familiarization and infrequent operation of the installed flight director and autopilot system."

— NTSB Report AAR-70-02

Asoh was a veteran pilot who had flown with Japan Air Lines for 14 years in 1968, with roughly 10,000 hours of flight time, 1,000 of them on DC-8s. During World War II he served as a flight instructor for the Japanese military. His first officer, Joseph Hazen, had similar flight experience and served in the Marine Corps before flying for Air America from 1961 to 1968. Asoh had 1,062 hours of flight time in the DC-8, while Hazen had 18. After becoming familiarized with the DC-8-62 in April 1968, Asoh piloted approximately one round-trip from Tokyo to San Francisco and back via Honolulu per month, starting in July. At the time, Asoh stated (through a translator) that "the plane was fully automatic" and he couldn't "say what was wrong [to cause the water landing]" because he had been in contact with the control tower during the entire approach and was never informed he had deviated from the flight path.

According to the NTSB report, Asoh failed to follow the published Japan Air Lines procedures to perform an autopilot-controlled descent from the Woodside Vortac and subsequent automatic-coupled approach on ILS. Had the procedure been followed, the localizer first would be coupled, then the flight director/autopilot coupling system would permit the glide slope to be captured. According to his statement, Asoh did not set the autopilot for ILS capture until the aircraft had descended to an altitude of 2,500 ft (760 m), when it was already below the required glide slope. In-cockpit instruments then should have been sufficient to warn the crew, more than three minutes before the water landing. Other JAL crews reported they were not trained in the use of the Sperry Flight Director System, resulting in revisions to the training program for flight crews. In addition, the language barrier between the commanding pilot and first officer could have been a contributing cause, as there was apparently insufficient "understanding, coordination, and confidence between crewmembers that the pilot flying the aircraft reacts to the other pilot's calls in a manner much the same as if he himself is looking through the other's eyes."

=== The "Asoh defense" ===
When asked by the NTSB about the landing, Asoh reportedly replied, "As you Americans say, I fucked up." In his 1988 book The Abilene Paradox, author Jerry B. Harvey termed this frank acceptance of blame the "Asoh defense", and the story and term have been taken up by a number of other management theorists.

== Aftermath ==
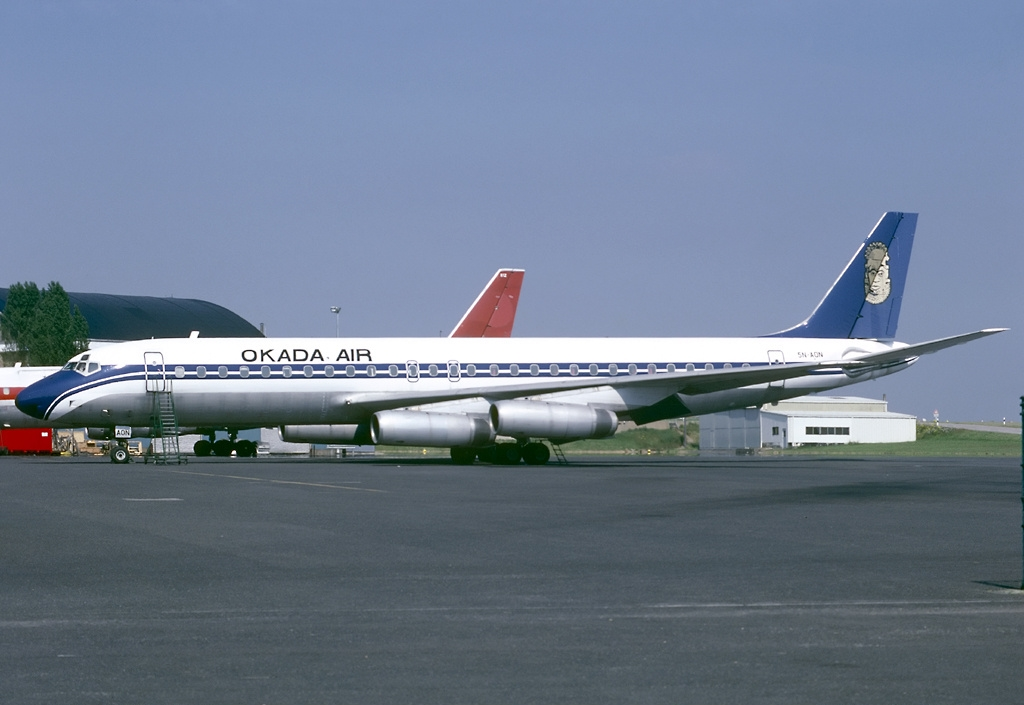
The aircraft was later flown for Okada Air

The aircraft was not severely damaged and was recovered 55 hours after the incident at high tide, after several failed earlier attempts to hoist it out of the water. Bigge Drayage Company recovered the airplane using four crane barges; the primary lift was handled by two Smith-Rice 90-ton Dravo revolving cranes under the wings, while two Healy-Tibbitts 50-ton cranes were positioned fore and aft to maintain the balance of the aircraft as it was lifted from the water. Because the tail had flooded, the aft crane performed the first lift to allow water to drain, and 20,000 US gal (76,000 L; 17,000 imp gal) of fresh water were used to rinse that section after 35 to 40 short tons (32 to 36 t) of saltwater had been removed. The forward crane was held in standby in case the load shifted due to movement of liquids inside the plane. A rig designed by Albert Kelly, named Air International Recovery (A.I.R.), was used during the salvage, equipped with lifting beams under each wing and a cradle for the nose. After being sprayed down with 20,000 US gallons (76,000 L; 17,000 imp gal) of fresh water, it was transported to the airport on a 150-foot (46 m) barge.

After being transported to the airport, Shiga rolled off the barge on its own landing gear. External damage was extremely minor, as it had been noted that the only part of external equipment damaged on the aircraft was the right gear bogie, as one wheel had been sheared off when the plane ditched. Further inspections revealed only slight structural damage, with repairs estimated to take less than six months.

United Airlines refurbished and repaired the aircraft for JAL for $4,000,000 (equivalent to $34,398,000 in 2025) over a period of six months. The aircraft was returned to JAL on March 31, 1969, and underwent a successful test flight on April 11, 1969, from San Francisco to Honolulu. It was later renamed Hidaka (日高) and continued in service to JAL until 1983.

Asoh was temporarily barred from passenger planes, demoted to First Officer, went through further ground training, and continued to fly for JAL until his retirement. Hazen also returned to flying a few months later.

By 1973 Japan Air Lines was using Boeing 747 aircraft on the Tokyo to San Francisco route. Today, Japan Airlines still operates a route named Flight 2 (JAL002) from Haneda to San Francisco, currently using the Boeing 777-300ER or Boeing 787-9.

=== Aircraft later history ===
JA8032 was sold to Air ABC (registration TF-BBF), then to Okada Air (registration 5N-AON), and finally flew as an express freighter for Airborne Express (registration N808AX) before being decommissioned and scrapped at Wilmington Air Park (ILN) in December 2001.

== See also ==
- Japan Air Lines Flight 350 – a DC-8 which ditched in Tokyo Bay short of Haneda in 1982
- Scandinavian Airlines System Flight 933 – a DC-8 which ditched in Santa Monica Bay short of LAX in 1969
