= Civil Aerospace Medical Institute =

Medical research branch of the Office of Aerospace Medicine

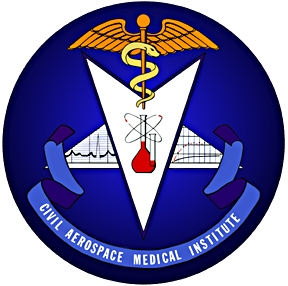

Agency overview
- Formed: August 15, 1960
- Preceding agencies: Civil Aeromedical Research Institute; Civil Aeromedical Institute
- Jurisdiction: United States Government
- Headquarters: Oklahoma City, Oklahoma
- Agency executive: Melchor J. Antuñano, M.D., Director
- Parent agency: United States Department of Transportation
- Website: Official website

The Civil Aerospace Medical Institute (CAMI) is the medical certification, education, research, and occupational medicine wing of the Office of Aerospace Medicine (AAM) under the auspices of the Federal Aviation Administration Office of Aviation Safety. The Institute's primary goal is to enhance aviation safety.

== History ==
America's first successful flight was in 1903, but amazingly, five years would pass before the first fatal aviation accident. Since then, safety has been an important concern. In 1926, the Civil Aeronautics Act marshaled the talents of the medical profession to certify that all aviators are physically fit to fly. In August 1958, the Federal Aviation Act, which created an independent federal agency, was passed. As part of the organizational changes that followed the FAA Act of 1958, an Office of the Civil Air Surgeon was established. On 31 October 1959 plans were announced to create the Civil Aeromedical Research Institute (CARI) which was established in 1961. A new CARI building was opened at the Aeronautical Center in Oklahoma City.

In 1965 the Institute's organizational scope and structure were enlarged and CARI was renamed the Civil Aeromedical Institute (CAMI). The organizational changes designated all research laboratories as an aeromedical research branch along with aeromedical certification, aeromedical education, and a medical clinic branch. The Institute's people— scientists, engineers, physicians, medical specialists, educators, pilots, technicians, communicators, and others — all merged as a team. In 2001, CAMI was expanded to incorporate commercial space transportation, and its name was changed to the Civil Aerospace Medical Institute.

The principal concern at CAMI is the human element in flight—pilots, passengers, air traffic controllers, and the entire human support system that embraces civil aviation. Researchers study the factors that influence human performance in the aerospace environment, find ways to understand them, and communicate that understanding to the aviation community.

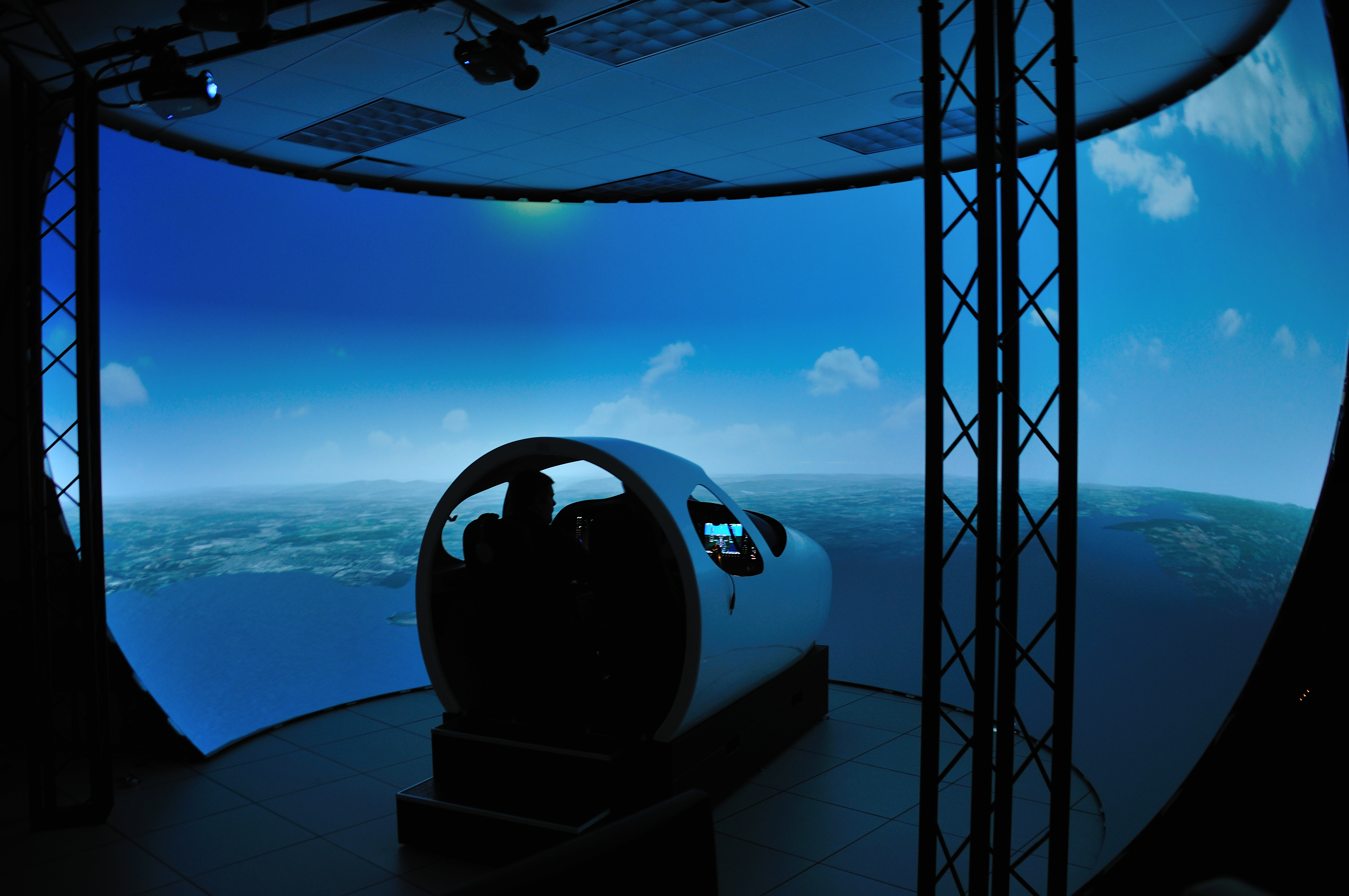
Very Light Jet Simulator

Over 280 scientists, physicians, educators, pilots, technicians, and administrative personnel work at CAMI, which is located at the Mike Monroney Aeronautical Center (MMAC) in Oklahoma City, Oklahoma, at the corner of Southwest 66th Street and MacArthur Boulevard. On static display in front of the CAMI building is a Lear Fan, one of only three ever produced.

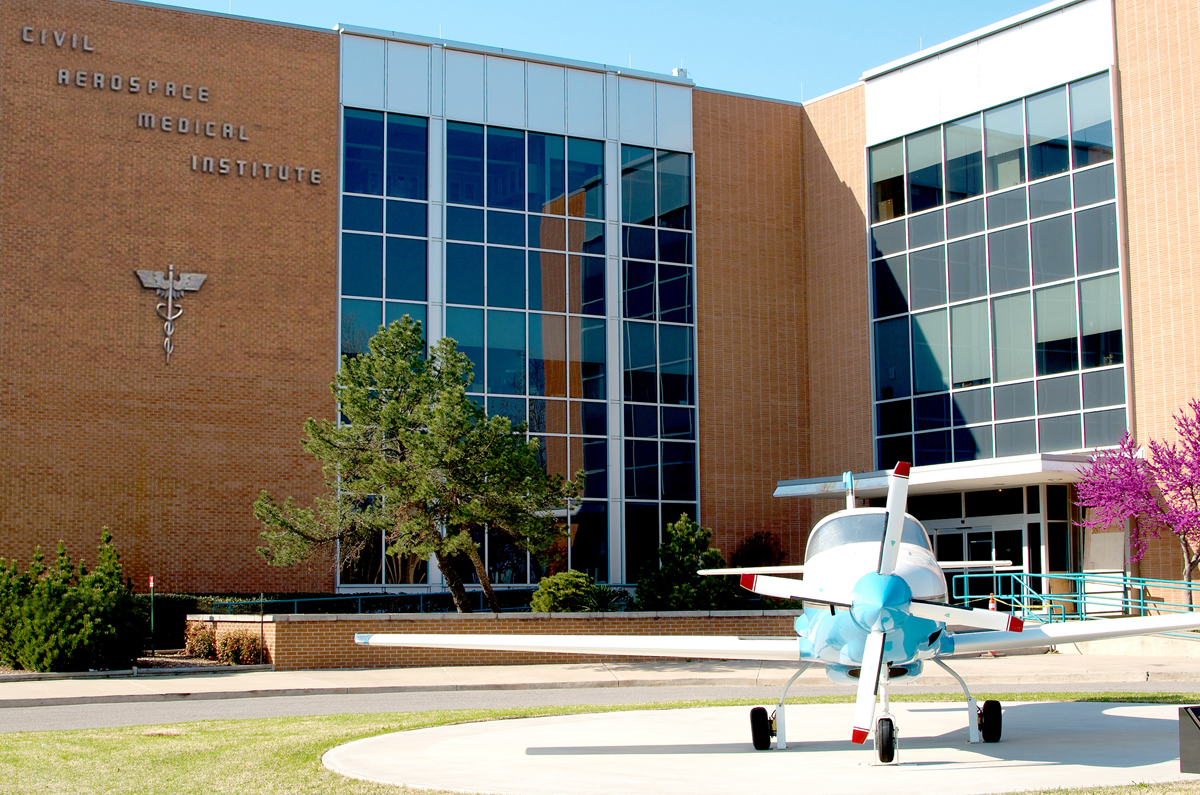
The Civil Aerospace Medical Institute building, showing the prior static display aircraft a Lancair Tigress with Orenda V8

CAMI is organized into five divisions:

== Aerospace Medical Certification ==
Develops, recommends, administers, and evaluates standards and procedures for all FAA airmen medical certification activities and associated recordkeeping systems. By federal law, all aviators must be medically certified. Airman medical certificates are issued by the division on the basis of physical examinations performed by Aviation Medical Examiners (AMEs); approximately 3,500 physicians who are authorized to conduct aviation medical examinations of civil airmen throughout the United States and abroad. The Division manages a national repository of airmen medical records and a system for processing such records; it administers review systems for the professional evaluation and disposition of applications for medical certification; and makes recommendations to the Federal Air Surgeon on the disposition of requests for special issuance certification.

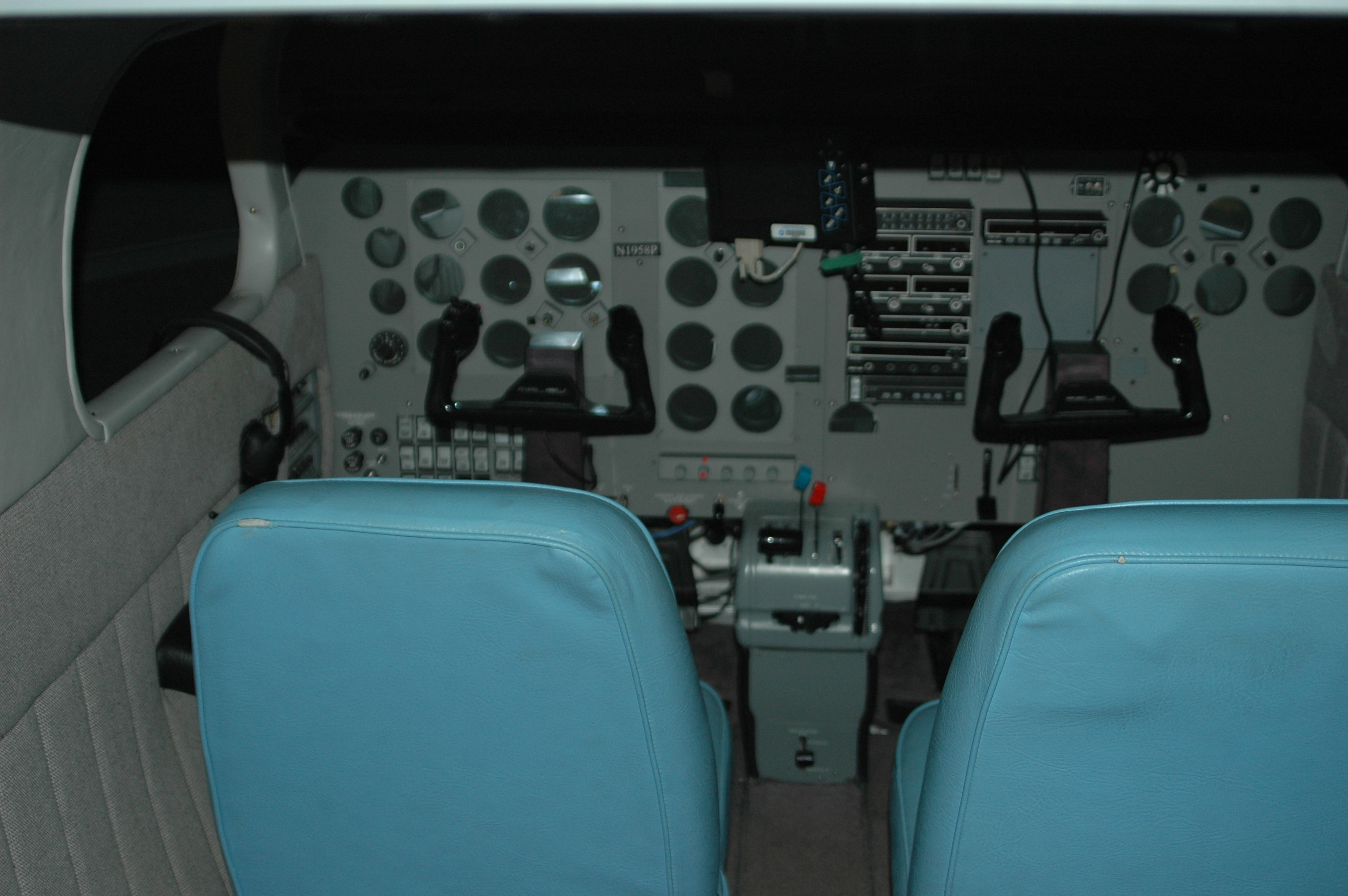
Advanced General Aviation Research Simulator (AGARS)

== Aerospace Medical Education ==
Plans and develops standard criteria and administers a centralized program for the selection, designation, training, and management of AMEs. CAMI education personnel also operate and maintain CAMI's altitude chambers, thermal chamber, spatial disorientation trainers, emergency ditching simulators, and other facilities. These facilities are used in support of physiological and global survival training programs as well as research projects. They also plan, develop, and conduct nationwide training activities to disseminate aerospace medical information and scientific data to FAA personnel, AMEs, airmen, aviation industry, aviation organizations, and the general public in support of the agency's mission of promoting aviation safety. The division also manages and maintains the CAMI Aerospace Medical Library and supports international exchange programs that facilitate interaction between aerospace medicine professionals, enable the exchange of scientific information, and promote the FAA's goal of international leadership in aerospace medicine.

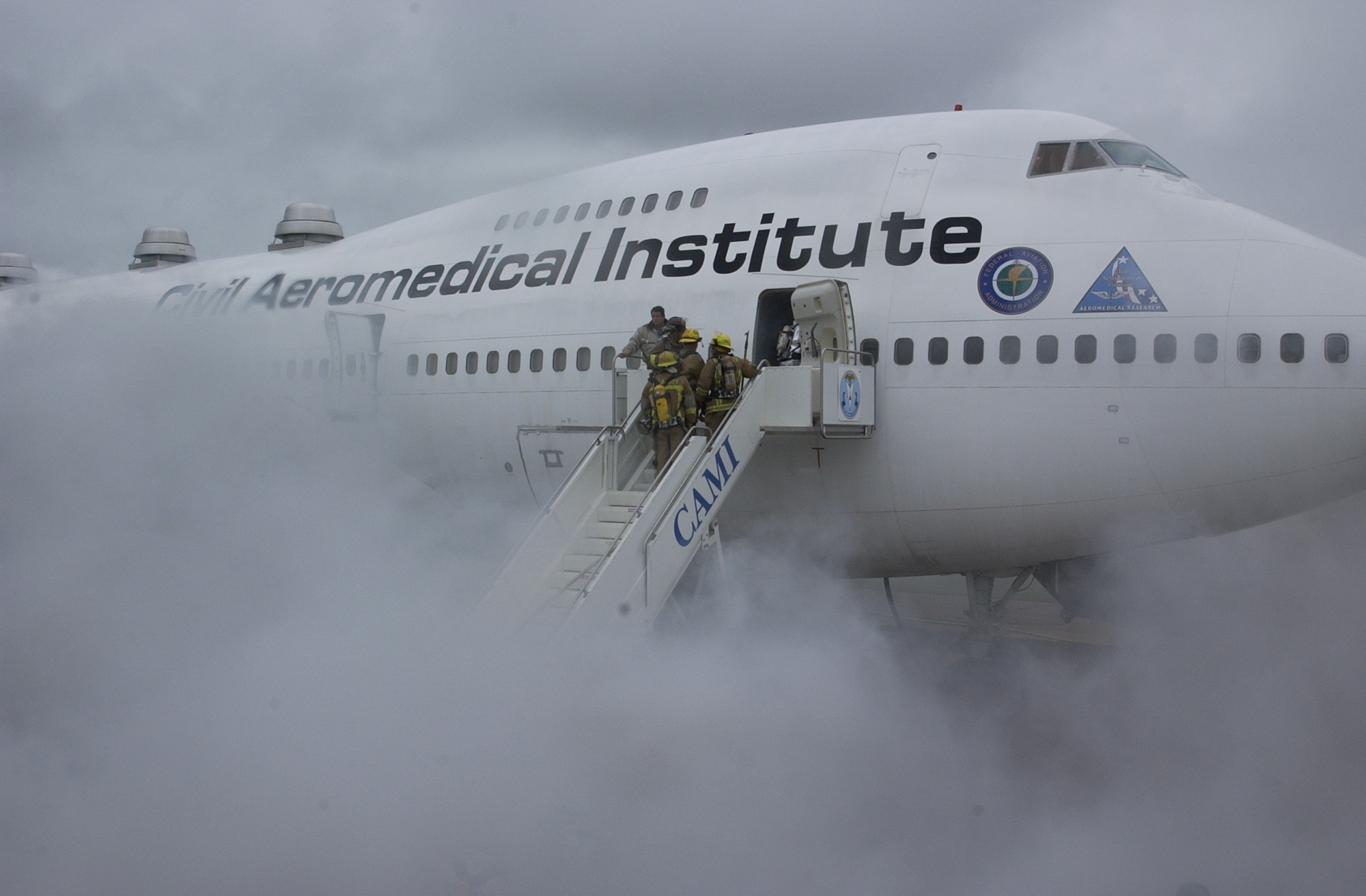
Aircraft Environmental Research Facility

== Aerospace Human Factors Research ==
Conducts an integrated program of field and laboratory research in human factors aspects of aviation work environments. Research includes assessments of human performance under various conditions of impairment, human error analysis and remediation, agency work force optimization, assessing the impact of advanced automated systems on personnel requirements and performance, human factors evaluations of performance changes associated with advanced multifunction displays and controls in general aviation and air traffic control, and the psychophysiological effects of workload and shift work on job proficiency and safety in aviation-related human-machine systems. This research is accomplished within two laboratories in support of the FAA Air Traffic Organization, the Flight Deck Human Factors Research Laboratory and the National Airspace System (NAS) Human Factors Safety Research Laboratory. Research facilities within these laboratories include head-mounted display systems and numerous aircraft control, general aviation, and unmanned aircraft simulators.

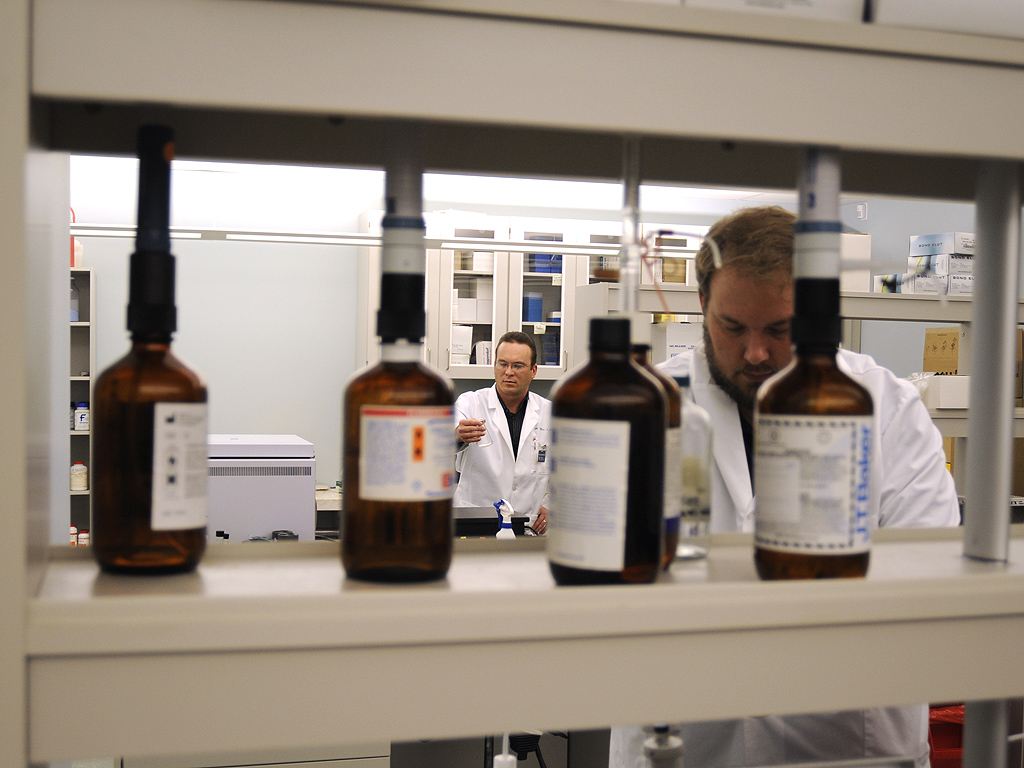
Forensic Toxicology Research Laboratory

== Aerospace Medical Research ==
Aerospace Medical Research conducts a cross-functional research program concerned with issues ranging from the molecular to the cosmic level of aerospace medicine so as to improve the safety of humans in civilian aerospace operations. In support of this research, databases of medical and aircraft accident data are maintained. The division is composed of two research laboratories: Bioaeronautical Sciences Research Laboratory and Protection & Survival Research Laboratory.

=== Bioaeronautical Sciences Research Laboratory ===
At the Bioaeronautical Sciences Research Laboratory, personnel study and analyze chemical, physiological, and medical factors in aircraft accidents/incidents and define relationships between those findings and the safe, secure, and healthy operation of aerospace craft. The laboratory's research areas are: forensic toxicology, biochemistry, functional genomics, radiobiology, and bioinformatics.

=== Protection & Survival Research Laboratory ===
At the Protection & Survival Research Laboratory, personnel provide information, procedures, and equipment evaluations relative to aircraft accident investigation, survivability, health, and security of passengers and crewmembers during normal operations and emergency events. The laboratory's research areas are: cabin safety, biodynamics, environmental physiology, medical review of accidents, and vision. This laboratory also supports the FAA and the National Transportation Safety Board in the collection and disposition of autopsy data resulting from aircraft accident investigations. Research facilities within these laboratories include a hypobaric test chamber, protective breathing equipment and water survival test facilities, a dynamic impact test facility, and aircraft evacuation/cabin environment simulators.

== Occupational Health ==
Provides professional and technical assistance concerning the medical aspects of environmental and occupational safety and health. It also serves as the CAMI Clinic, providing primary care level of medical services for domestic and international students attending the FAA Academy in OKC. The division also administers the FAA's Institutional Review Board (IRB) established for the protection of human subjects participating in research conducted or sponsored by the FAA.

== See also ==
- Aircraft Owners and Pilots Association
- Association of Flight Attendants
- Federal Laboratory Consortium
- Human Intervention Motivation Study
- International Civil Aviation Organization
- Office of Commercial Space Transportation
- RAF Centre of Aviation Medicine
