= Northern California TRACON =

Air traffic control center in Mather, CA

- Location: Mather, California, US
- Coordinates: 38.5608°N 121.2572°W
- Parent organization: Federal Aviation Administration

Northern California TRACON (NCT, radio communications: NorCal, NorCal Approach and NorCal Departure) is a terminal radar approach control (TRACON) facility in Mather, California, that serves the Northern California region. It is a unit of the Air Traffic Organization (ATO) within the Federal Aviation Administration (FAA). As an air traffic control facility, NCT provides safety alerts, separation, and sequencing of air traffic that is arriving, departing, and transiting the airspace and airports in Northern California.

NCT controls airspace over 19,000 square miles (49,000 km^{2}), and serves San Francisco International Airport, Oakland International Airport, San Jose International Airport, Reno International Airport, Sacramento International Airport, plus 19 other smaller airports with airport traffic control towers. NCT is the 3rd busiest TRACON in the US. In 2024, NCT handled 1,522,806, almost as many as Oakland Center.

NCT is primarily divided into six sectors, being areas A (Morgan, Seca, Toga, and Licke), B (Boulder, Cedar, Foster, Laguna, Niles, and Woodside), C (Valley, Grove, and Sunol), D (Richmond and Sutro), E (Paradise, Elkhorn), and R (Nugget and Silver). These sectors all carry the callsign "NorCal Approach" or "Norcal Departure", and are separated on multiple frequencies. These sectors have variable altitudes ranging from the surface to FL190 (19,000 ft).

NorCal TRACON is the step between local control and an Air Route Traffic Control Center (ARTCC), in this case, Oakland Center.

When an arriving aircraft nears the Bay Area, Oakland Center advises it to contact NorCal TRACON. TRACON gives the arrival a descent profile and other landing aid clearances. During busy times, TRACON often has to hold aircraft in the air. After TRACON sets up the flight for an approach to landing, the flight contacts the air traffic control tower at the arrival airport for landing clearance.

== See also ==
- Southern California TRACON
