= Southern California TRACON =

Air traffic control facility in San Diego, California, US

- Interactive map of the Southern California TRACON area

General information
- Location: 9175 Kearny Villa Rd, San Diego, CA 92126, United States
- Coordinates: 32.8913°N 117.1171°W
- Owner: Federal Aviation Administration

Southern California TRACON (SoCal TRACON or SCT, radio communications: SoCal, SoCal Approach, SoCal Departure) is a terminal radar approach control (TRACON) facility in San Diego, California, that serves the Southern California region. It is a unit of the Air Traffic Organization (ATO) of the Federal Aviation Administration (FAA). Southern California TRACON is the busiest approach control facility in the United States. In 2024, SoCal handled 2,212,674 aircraft operations, handling more aircraft than 11 of the 22 area control centers in the United States.

== Area breakdown ==
SCT serves the following major Southern California airports (in order of volume, Class B & C), in addition to many surrounding satellite airports.

- Los Angeles International Airport - LAX - Los Angeles
- John Wayne Airport - SNA - Costa Mesa
- Long Beach Airport - LGB - Long Beach
- San Diego International Airport - SAN - San Diego
- Marine Corps Air Station Miramar - NKX - San Diego
- Hollywood Burbank Airport - BUR - Burbank
- Ontario International Airport - ONT - Ontario

SCT is broken down into six areas and a Traffic Management Unit:

- Burbank Area: Responsible for BUR, VNY, & WHP
- Del Rey Area: Responsible for SMO, LAX, TOA & HHR departures
- Los Angeles Area: Responsible for LAX & HHR & SMO arrivals
- Coast Area: Responsible for SNA, LGB, FUL, TOA & SLI
- San Diego Area: Responsible for SAN, NKX, NZY, NFG, MYF, SEE, SDM, RNM & CRQ
- Empire Area: Responsible for ONT, AJO, PSP, RIV, SBD, RAL, CNO, EMT, & POC

Each area has five or six individual sectors that are worked by controllers. SoCal TRACON is responsible for the handling of aircraft departing and arriving these airports, generally below 16,000 feet (4,900 m). SCT is responsible for sequencing inbound, separating from crossing and VFR traffic, and departing traffic. Separation is achieved by vectoring traffic and assigning altitudes.

== Sectors ==
=== Area 1 (Burbank) ===
- Moorpark - 1M - 128.750
- Valley - 1V - 124.600
- Woodland - 1W - 134.200
- Filmore - 1F - 120.400
- Glendale - 1X - 135.050
- Pasadena - 1J - 119.850

=== Area 2 (Los Angeles) ===
- Downey - 2D - 124.900
- Stadium - 2U - 128.500
- Zuma - 2Z - 124.500
- Feeder - 2F - 124.050
- ILS Monitor 25 - 120.950
- ILS Monitor 24 - 133.900

=== Area 3 (Empire) ===
- Norton - 3N - 127.000
- Pomona - 3P - 125.500
- March - 3M - 119.250
- Riverside - 3I - 135.400
- Hemet - 3V - 134.000
- Springs - 3S - 126.700
- Desert - 3D - 135.275

=== Area 4 (Coast) ===
- Pacific - 4P - 128.100
- Tustin - 4T - 121.300
- Beach - 4B - 125.350
- Harbor - 4H - 127.200
- Maverick - 4A - 133.850
- Shore - 4S - 124.100

=== Area 5 (San Diego) ===
- North - 5N - 125.300
- South Bay - 5Z - 125.150
- East - 5E - 124.350
- West - 5W - 119.600
- Del Mar - 5D - 127.300
- Miramar - 5M - 132.200

=== Area 6 (Del Rey) ===
- Katalina - 6K - 127.400
- Laker - 6L - 134.900
- Malibu - 6N - 125.200
- Manhattan - 6S - 124.300
- Newport - 6X - 134.350

== See also ==
- Northern California TRACON
