= Mike Monroney Aeronautical Center =

Regional office of the United States Federal Aviation Administration

Coordinates: 35°23′55″N 97°37′7″W

Mike Monroney Aeronautical Center is a regional office of the United States Federal Aviation Administration (FAA) on the grounds of Will Rogers Airport in Oklahoma City. With around 7,500 direct federal employees, the Aeronautical Center is one of the Department of Transportation's largest facilities outside the Washington, DC area, and one of the 10 largest employers in the Oklahoma City metropolitan area. It is named for Senator Mike Monroney of Oklahoma, who wrote and sponsored the Federal Aviation Act of 1958.

== FAA Logistics Center ==
The FAA Logistics Center is an organization that supports the National Airspace System of air traffic controllers and aviation safety inspectors. The Logistics Center provides consulting, engineering, repair, distribution, and technical support for air traffic control services in the United States and 44 different countries. Because some of the components are unique and not in current production, the center also provides technical solutions through a network of engineers using in-house manufacturing and repair facilities.

== FAA Academy ==
The FAA Academy is a principal training facility of the FAA. Air traffic controllers receive their training at the Academy. The FAA Academy received accreditation from the North Central Association of Colleges and Schools. Different courses have different admissions criteria, with some being available to other government agencies, industry, and international civil aviation authorities.

- Technical – technical and managerial training and development for the FAA workforce and the aviation community. Services provided include
  - develop and conduct training courses
  - plan, maintain and manage FAA's distance learning systems for the FAA as well as industry and other agencies
  - provide training program management and consultation services
- Airports and International Training Division (AITD) – provides training and related services to the worldwide aviation community and supports the International Civil Aviation Organization (ICAO). Courses are available in Aviation Safety, Airway Facilities, Air Traffic, Airports, Aviation Security, Instructor Development, Management Development and Aviation English. Training can be delivered at the Academy or in-country.

== Other FAA services ==
The Aeronautical Center's Counsel advises the aviation public on matters regarding the registration of U.S. civil aircraft and the recordation of aircraft-related instruments. This office has responsibility for enforcing violations of FAR Sections 61.15 and 67.403 discovered through the FAA's DUI/DWI Program, including representing the Administrator before the NTSB in appeals of certificate actions. It provides legal advice and representation on procurement actions generated on behalf of FAA Headquarters, Regional and Center offices, including the FAA Logistics Center and FAA Academy, and represents the FAA in protests and contract disputes.

=== Civil Aerospace Medical Institute (CAMI) ===
The Civil Aerospace Medical Institute (CAMI) is the medical certification, education, research, and occupational medicine wing of the Office of Aerospace Medicine (AAM) and consists of:

- Certification Division – responsible for the administration the aeromedical certification needs for US pilot certificates
  - FAA Medical Certification Program
- Medical Education Division – responsible for policy development, planning, evaluation, and administration of:
  - centralized program for the selection, designation, training, and management of Aviation Medical Examiners in the U.S. and in 93 other countries
  - aeromedical education programs for FAA flight crews and civil aviation pilots
  - aeromedical publications (aviation safety brochures, research technical reports, and the Federal Air Surgeon's Medical Bulletin) and other materials used to disseminate aeromedical information to promote aviation safety
  - aeromedical and aviation safety reference/research library system
- Human Factors Research Division – conducts an integrated program of field and laboratory performance research in organizational and human factors aspects of aviation work environments
- Aerospace Medical Research Division – responsible for enhancing human safety, security, and survivability in civilian aerospace operations with three main research activities:
  - investigation of the injury and death patterns in civilian flight accidents, analysis to determine cause and prevention strategies
  - development of recommendations for protective equipment and procedures
  - evaluation of proposal of safety and health regulations addressing aircraft cabins

==== Research Associateship Program ====
The National Academy of Sciences offers Research Associateship Programs for fellowship and other grants for CAMI research. Eligibility requirements can vary for each research opportunity, and fellowships are available for Postdoctoral Associates.
